= Royal Rumble (2016) =

WWE pay-per-view and livestreaming event

- Promotional poster featuring John Cena
- Promotion: WWE
- Date: January 24, 2016
- City: Orlando, Florida
- Venue: Amway Center
- Attendance: 15,170
- Buy rate: 91,000 (excluding WWE Network views)

WWE event chronology
← Previous; NXT TakeOver: London	Next → Fastlane

Royal Rumble chronology
← Previous; 2015	Next → 2017

The 2016 Royal Rumble was a professional wrestling pay-per-view (PPV) and livestreaming event produced by WWE. It was the 29th annual Royal Rumble event and took place on January 24, 2016, at the Amway Center in Orlando, Florida. This was the fifth Royal Rumble event to be held in the U.S. state of Florida, after the 1990, 1991, 1995, and 2006 events, and the second in Orlando (after 1990), and it was WWE's first PPV and livestreaming event to be held at the Amway Center.

The event was based around the men's Royal Rumble match, a modified 30-man battle royal in which the participants enter at timed intervals instead of all beginning in the ring at the same time. Since 1993, the winner had received a world championship match at that year's WrestleMania. For the 2016 event, however, Roman Reigns was scheduled to defend the WWE World Heavyweight Championship in the 2016 Royal Rumble match as the number one entrant. This was the main event, which was won by the returning Triple H, who eliminated Reigns before lastly eliminating Dean Ambrose to win the championship. This was Triple H's second Royal Rumble win, after 2002, making him the sixth multi-time winner, and he became the third person to win the match as the number 30 entrant. This was only the second time that a Royal Rumble winner won a world championship for winning the eponymous match, after the 1992 event where the vacant title was the prize, however, it was the first and only time in which the reigning champion defended the title in the match.

Five other matches were contested at the event, including one on the Kickoff pre-show. The event was notable for the WWE PPV and livestreaming event debut of longtime Total Nonstop Action Wrestling mainstay AJ Styles as the third entrant in the Royal Rumble match. This was also the last Royal Rumble event to be held before the reintroduction of the brand extension in July, subsequently making it the last to feature one world championship.

== Production ==
=== Background ===
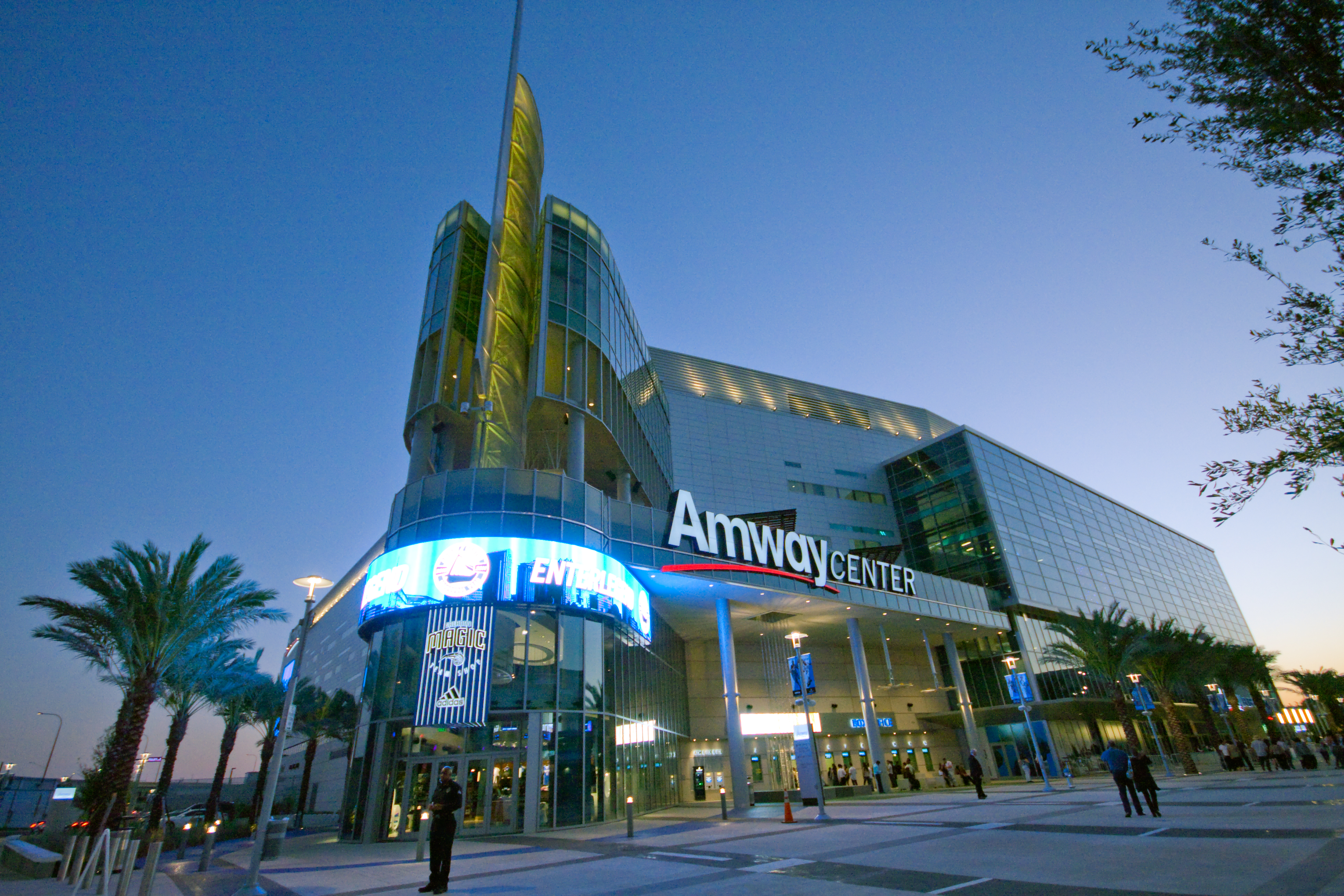
The 29th annual Royal Rumble event was held at the Amway Center in Orlando, Florida.

The Royal Rumble is an annual professional wrestling event, produced every January by WWE since 1988; that first event was a television special before it became a pay-per-view (PPV) event beginning in 1989 and then also available via livestreaming on the WWE Network since 2015. It is one of the promotion's original four PPVs, along with WrestleMania, SummerSlam, and Survivor Series, referred to as the "Big Four". It is named after and centered on the men's Royal Rumble match. The 29th Royal Rumble event was scheduled to be held on January 24, 2016, at the Amway Center in Orlando, Florida. This was the fifth Royal Rumble event to be held in the U.S. state of Florida, after the 1990, 1991, 1995, and 2006 events, and the second in Orlando (after 1990), but the first at the Amway Center.

The Royal Rumble match is a modified battle royal in which the participants enter at timed intervals instead of all beginning in the ring at the same time, and the match generally features 30 wrestlers. Since 1993, the winner traditionally earned a world championship match at that year's WrestleMania. For 2016, that would have been a WWE World Heavyweight Championship match at WrestleMania 32; however, reigning champion Roman Reigns was scheduled to defend the title in the match as the number one entrant. This marked the second time that the promotion's world championship was the prize of the match (the first being in 1992), but the first time in which the champion defended the title in the match, as in 1992, the championship had been vacated, and it was decided that the Rumble winner would win the vacant title.

=== Storylines ===
The event comprised six matches, including one on the Kickoff pre-show, that resulted from scripted storylines. Results were predetermined by WWE's writers, while storylines were produced on WWE's weekly television shows, Raw and SmackDown.

Traditionally, the winner of the 30-man Royal Rumble match is awarded a world championship match at WrestleMania. However, as a culmination of his attempts to deprive the WWE World Heavyweight Champion Roman Reigns for attacking his son-in-law Triple H and overall disrespecting the McMahon family, WWE Chief Executive Officer and Chairman Vince McMahon decided that Reigns would have to defend his title in the Rumble match as entrant number one.

On the December 28 episode of Raw, Big Show was the first wrestler to announce his participation in the Royal Rumble match. Early in January, Curtis Axel, Ryback, The Wyatt Family (Bray Wyatt, Luke Harper, Erick Rowan, and Braun Strowman), Dolph Ziggler, Chris Jericho, Stardust, and Sheamus were added to the match. On the January 11 episode of Raw, Stephanie McMahon announced that Brock Lesnar would compete in the match in spite of Lesnar's advocate Paul Heyman arguing that Lesnar should bypass the match and face the winner at WrestleMania 32. The next week on Raw, a rigged lottery assigned the #1 spot to Reigns, meaning that he would be the first contestant to enter the match.

At TLC: Tables, Ladders & Chairs, Dean Ambrose defeated Kevin Owens to win the WWE Intercontinental Championship. Their rivalry intensified for over weeks; including a match ending in a double countout for the Intercontinental Championship. On the January 14 episode of SmackDown, Owens accepted Ambrose's challenge to a Last Man Standing match for the Intercontinental Championship at the Royal Rumble.

On the January 7 episode of SmackDown, John Cena introduced Kalisto as an opponent for United States Champion Alberto Del Rio. After Kalisto won the match, he was granted a title match on the January 11 episode of Raw, in which he defeated Del Rio to win the United States Championship. Del Rio went on to win back the championship the following night on SmackDown. Subsequently, another title match between the two was scheduled for the Royal Rumble.

On the January 4 episode of Raw, Becky Lynch was attacked by Divas Champion Charlotte after defeating her in a non-title match. With the help of father Ric Flair, Charlotte defeated Lynch to retain the championship on the January 7 episode of SmackDown. Subsequently, Lynch challenged Charlotte for another title match at the Royal Rumble. Though Charlotte was unwilling to grant Lynch another title opportunity, Lynch goaded Flair to accept the challenge on his daughter's behalf.

On the January 11 episode of Raw, The Usos (Jey Uso and Jimmy Uso) defeated WWE Tag Team Champions The New Day (Kofi Kingston and Big E, with Xavier Woods) in a non-title match. The following week on Raw, a title match between the two teams was scheduled for the Royal Rumble.

On January 20, a fatal four-way tag team match between Darren Young and Damien Sandow, The Dudley Boyz (Bubba Ray Dudley and D-Von Dudley), The Ascension (Konnor and Viktor), and Mark Henry and Jack Swagger was scheduled for the Royal Rumble pre-show, with both members of the winning team earning a spot in the Royal Rumble match later in the night.

== Event ==
Other on-screen personnel
Role:	Name:
English commentators	Michael Cole
English commentators	John "Bradshaw" Layfield
English commentators	Byron Saxton
Spanish commentators	Carlos Cabrera
Spanish commentators	Marcelo Rodríguez
French commentators	Christophe Agius
French commentators	Philippe Chereau
Ring announcers	Lilian Garcia
Ring announcers	Eden Stiles
Referees	John Cone
Referees	Dan Engler
Referees	Mike Chioda
Referees	Charles Robinson
Referees	Rod Zapata
Backstage interviewers	Rich Brennan
Pre-show panel	Renee Young
Pre-show panel	Booker T
Pre-show panel	Jerry Lawler
Pre-show panel	Corey Graves

=== Pre-show ===
On the Royal Rumble kickoff pre-show, The Dudley Boyz (Bubba Ray Dudley and D-Von Dudley), Jack Swagger and Mark Henry, Damien Sandow and Darren Young, and The Ascension (Konnor and Viktor) competed in a fatal four-way tag team match, in which the winners would qualify for the Royal Rumble match. In the end, Bubba Ray and D-Von performed a 3-D on Viktor before Swagger applied a Patriot Lock on Bubba Ray whilst Henry performed a Running Splash on Bubba Ray. Henry pinned Viktor, allowing Swagger and Henry to qualify for the Royal Rumble match.

=== Preliminary matches ===
The actual pay-per-view opened with Dean Ambrose defending the Intercontinental Championship against Kevin Owens in a Last Man Standing match. During the match, Owens performed a Cannonball through the barricade on Ambrose. Owens attempted a Powerbomb on Ambrose through two chairs but Ambrose countered with a Back Body Drop through the chairs. Ambrose performed Dirty Deeds on Owens on a chair. Ambrose performed a Diving Elbow Drop on Owens through a table. Owens performed a Swinging Fisherman Suplex off the top rope on Ambrose through a table. In the end, Ambrose pushed Owens off the top rope through two tables stacked outside the ring. As Owens could not stand by a ten count, Ambrose won the match to retain the title.

Next, The New Day (Big E and Kofi Kingston) (accompanied by Xavier Woods) defended the WWE Tag Team Championship against The Usos (Jimmy Uso and Jey Uso). In the closing moments of the match, Big E tackled Jimmy into the barricade, only for Jey to perform a Superkick on Big E. Jey leapt to the top rope but was caught by Big E, who performed a Big Ending on Jey to retain the titles.

After that, Alberto Del Rio defended the United States Championship against Kalisto. During the match Del Rio attempted a double foot stomp on Kalisto whilst he was held in the tree of woe, but Kalisto avoided it and executed a Salida Del Sol, however, Del Rio grabbed the ropes to void the pinfall. In the end, as Del Rio removed the padding from a turnbuckle, Kalisto performed a Diving Hurricanrana on Del Rio, knocking Del Rio into the exposed turnbuckle. Kalisto performed a second Salida Del Sol on Del Rio to win the title.

In the fourth match, Charlotte defended her Divas Championship against Becky Lynch. In the climax of the match, as Lynch applied the Dis-arm-her on Charlotte, Ric Flair threw his jacket onto Lynch. Lynch threw the jacket only for Charlotte to execute a Spear on Lynch to retain the championship. After the match, Sasha Banks returned and applied the Bank Statement on Charlotte. Flair pulled Charlotte out of the ring.

=== Main event ===
The main event was the 30-man Royal Rumble match for the WWE World Heavyweight Championship. WWE World Heavyweight Champion Roman Reigns and Rusev began the match as the number one and number two entrants, respectively. After Reigns eliminated Rusev, AJ Styles entered at number three, marking Styles's WWE pay-per-view debut, and eliminated the next entrants, Tyler Breeze and Curtis Axel, the latter of who was attacked by Erick Rowan a year earlier. On orders of WWE chairman Vince McMahon, the League of Nations (Sheamus, Rusev, and Alberto Del Rio) pulled Reigns out of the ring and attacked him, where Rusev performed a Running Splash on Reigns through a broadcast table, causing an injured Reigns to be taken backstage.

As the match continued, Braun Strowman eliminated Kane and Big Show. Kevin Owens eliminated AJ Styles but was later eliminated by Sami Zayn, who was a surprise entrant at number twenty. Brock Lesnar eliminated Jack Swagger and three members of the Wyatt Family: Erick Rowan, Luke Harper, and Braun Strowman. When Bray Wyatt entered, The Wyatt Family attacked Lesnar again and eliminated him from the match. Whilst Sheamus entered, Reigns attacked him with a Superman Punch before returning to the match. Reigns then eliminated The Miz and Alberto Del Rio.

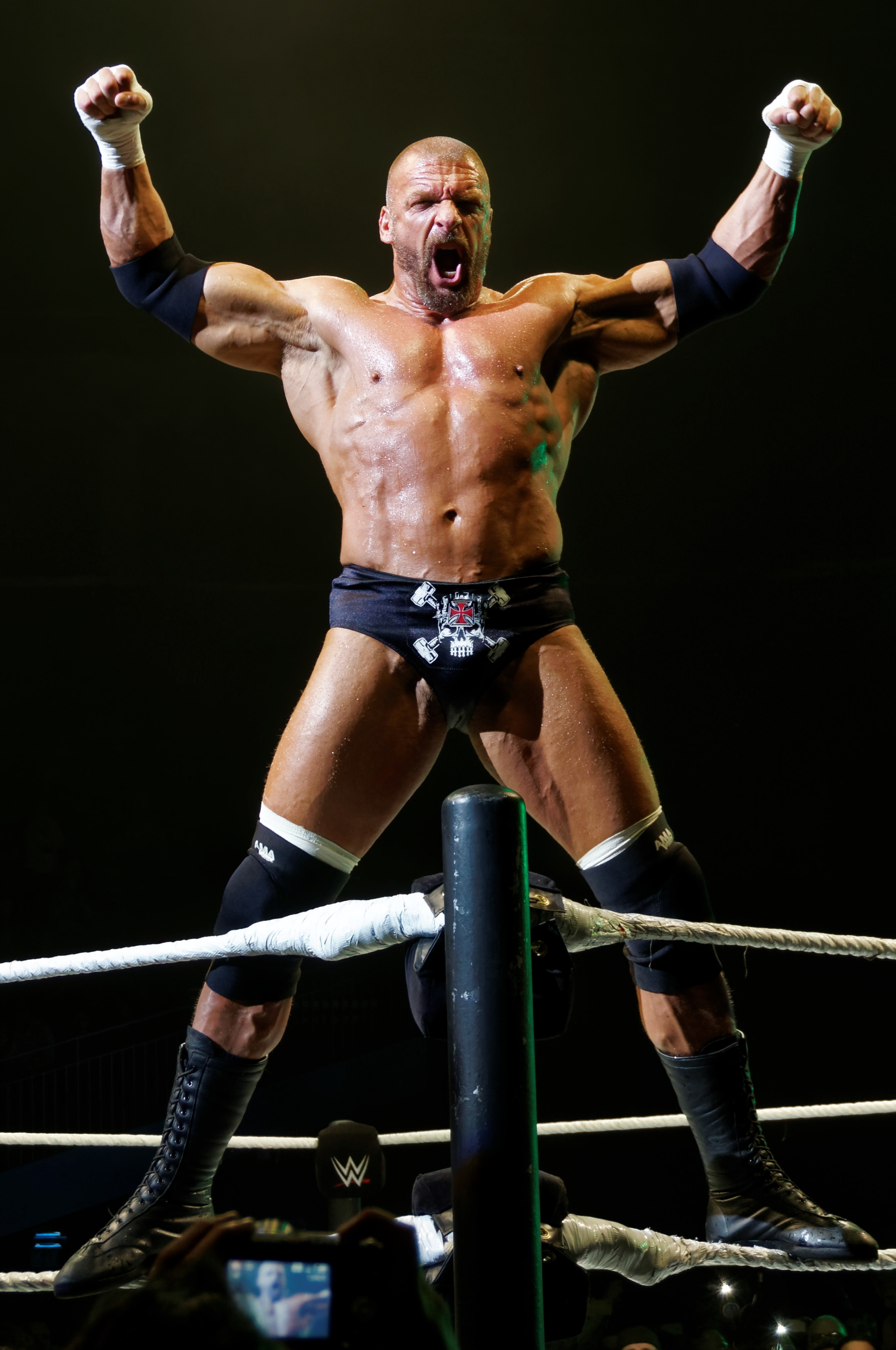
Triple H won the 2016 Royal Rumble match to become WWE World Heavyweight Champion in his second overall win.

At number thirty, Triple H, who had been inactive since being attacked by Roman Reigns at TLC, made his return and eliminated Dolph Ziggler. Sheamus performed a Brogue Kick on Wyatt and, together with Triple H, eliminated Wyatt. Chris Jericho was eliminated by Dean Ambrose. Sheamus attempted another Brogue Kick on Ambrose; however, Ambrose countered and Sheamus fell onto the ring apron. Reigns eliminated Sheamus after a Superman Punch only for Triple H to eliminate him. After a back-and-forth shuffle, Triple H eliminated Ambrose, resulting in Triple H winning his second Royal Rumble and becoming WWE World Heavyweight Champion for the ninth time, and a 14-time World Champion overall.

== Reception ==
The event received generally positive reviews, with most commentators praising the undercard (particularly the Last Man Standing match between Dean Ambrose and Kevin Owens) and noting a marked improvement in the titular match from the 2014 and 2015 events.

Some of the reviewers were more critical of the event, such as John Powell of Slam! Wrestling rating the match a 6-out-of-10 match, expressing his disappointment in the outcome of the main event match which he felt represented WWE "going out of their way to frustrate fans and keep their product in a continued state of uninspired monotony". Powell claimed that it "had its moments here and there" but also noting inconsistencies with the past 28 matches, such as allowing Roman Reigns to rejoin after "missing the majority of the match". The Intercontinental title match was the best rated on the show at 8.5 out of 10, and was described as a "very brutal affair with Owens and Ambrose hammering each other into oblivion with chairs, kendo sticks and tables". The tag title match was called "standard, hum-drum" and rated 5 out of 10; the United States title match was "a classic David vs. Goliath encounter", rated 6 out of 10, and the women's title match was described as "unexceptional" with a poor ending, rated 3 out of 10. The pre-show match was also rated 3 out of 10, described as a "snorefest" and a "mess". Lastly, Powell described AJ Styles' re-debut as "one of the highlights of the night", and noted the positive crowd responses to Becky Lynch and Damien Sandow.

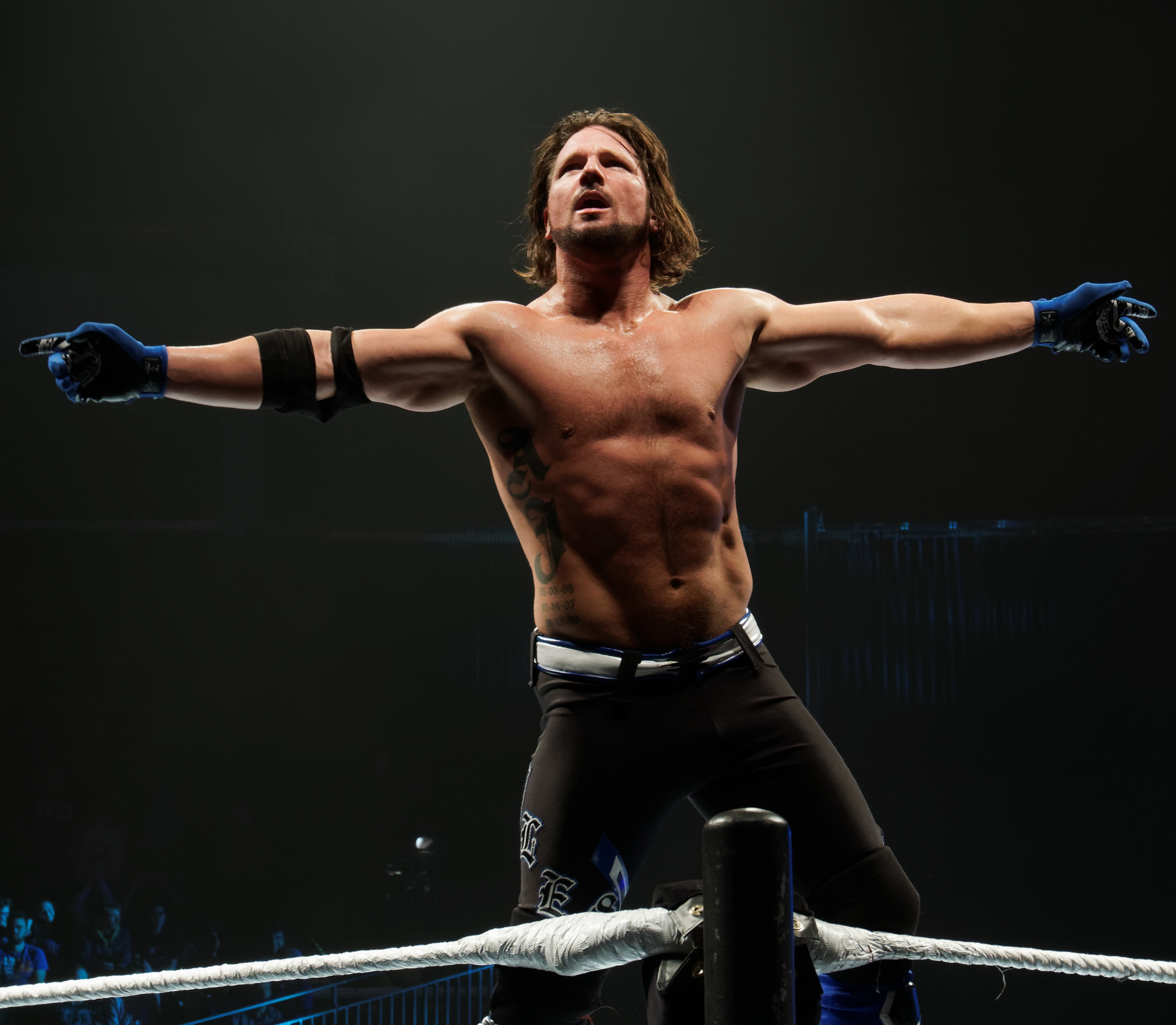
AJ Styles, making his WWE pay-per-view debut, entered the Royal Rumble match as entrant #3. Styles had briefly wrestled in WWE in 2002 before rising to stardom in NJPW, TNA, ROH, and other independent promotions.

Dave Scherer of PWInsider wrote that the opening match for the Intercontinental Championship was "an awesome spectacle, with really good psychology mixed in" as "it felt like they hated each other". Scherer added that the tag title match was "a lot of fun", and the United States title match "good, if you can appreciate Lucha", otherwise "a lot of Kalisto's offense isn't believable". Scherer expressed mild disappointment towards the Divas Championship match, writing that it was not an "NXT style match", and described Ric Flair forcibly kissing Becky Lynch as "sexual assault". For the Royal Rumble match, Scherer, according to him, noted that the booking of the match turned the crowd against Roman Reigns, writing that "Vince thought he booked [the Rumble] for the people to cheer for Reigns", but that "the Orlando crowd made Triple H the "face". Scherer added that he was not surprised at Triple H's entry and win of the main event.

James Montgomery of Rolling Stone wrote that "the Royal Rumble was an entertaining show, paced by the battle royal and bolstered by its undercard". He described the opening match as "a thoroughly entertaining I.C. battle" and the tag-team title match as "a creative match that had its moments, but hopefully signaled the end of this feud". He described the United States Championship bout as "a hard-hitting match that featured a great false finish", and expressed his desire for Kalisto to have "an extended run" with it. For the Royal Rumble match, Montgomery wrote that it was a "pretty good Rumble. Storylines began and advanced." He described the arrival of AJ Styles as "surreal" and praised Dean Ambrose's performance, writing that "his future appears to be brightening by the minute". However, he expressed disappointment at the use of Brock Lesnar in the match and added that "Triple H's victory at the Royal Rumble will no doubt cool some folks' reactions to the event as a whole".

James Caldwell of Pro Wrestling Torch praised the Intercontinental Championship match, writing: "What a match. Just a nonstop battle capturing the story of this feud" and rating it as 4 and a quarter stars out of five. Caldwell rated the tag-team title match at 2 and a quarter stars out of five, describing it as "an up-and-down match with the main issue of no reason to view New Day as heels". He gave the United States Championship match 2 and three-quarters out of 5, calling it as a "solid, unspectacular singles match", and wrote that the Divas Championship match "was more of a bridge to what was next" in reference to the appearance of Sasha Banks. Caldwell gave the Rumble main event 3 and three-quarters out of 5, commenting that there were "overall, too many downpoints for this year's Rumble hurting some up-points". He wrote that "the Rumble started really well, got ridiculous in the middle with the now-annual compromise of the Rumble, and ended with the crowd not sure what to do with the players in the mix outside of Ambrose".

Will Pruett of Pro Wrestling Dot Net described the event as "a delightful show from beginning to end". The Rumble match was described as "very fun" and the best since 2010. Pruett raised questions over the booking of Roman Reigns, noting that he "failed to truly be heroic" twice at the event. In comparison, Pruett felt that Triple H came across being the "conquering hero" and "avenging party" in the storyline against Reigns. Regarding Dean Ambrose, Pruett felt he "was presented as more of a star on this show than he has been in a long time", commenting that "unlike Roman Reigns, who walked away, Ambrose fought hard and still kept fighting to the end". He described the opening match between Ambrose and Owens as "insane". Pruett wrote that the re-debuting AJ Styles "instantly seemed like he fit on the roster", but noted that he was "not presented in the upper echelon of WWE". For other matches, Pruett called Kalisto's win "a major surprise"; while lamenting that "the lines of the WWE women's division were blurred once again" as to who fans should support between Sasha Banks and Charlotte after their post-match antics.

Kyle Johnson of the Wrestling Observer specifically analyzed the merits of the Royal Rumble match. While not "one of the greatest", it achieved two "key things that any good Rumble should": firstly helping to "advance or create undercard storylines heading into Wrestlemania", secondly helping to "generate a handful of legitimate title contenders for the year to follow": Braun Strowman, Bray Wyatt, Kevin Owens and AJ Styles. For the negatives, Johnson highlighted storyline irregularities: Triple H winning cleanly without any "underhanded advantage"; Reigns "voluntarily" leaving a title match, returning later "not selling any injuries whatsoever", the League of Nations not eliminating Reigns; and no Lesnar rampage post-elimination.

=== Appraisals ===
Hall of Famer Bret Hart gave a strongly negative appraisal of the show, ranking the match as "one of the least exciting" in history, and the overall event as perhaps "the worst Royal Rumble". He said of Triple H's WWE World Heavyweight Championship win in the Rumble match "I didn't like the decision that Triple H, surprise, put the belt on himself again... it just showed a real lack of imagination if you ask me".

== Aftermath ==
On the following episode of Raw, The Authority decided that Triple H would defend the WWE World Heavyweight Championship at WrestleMania 32 against the winner of a triple threat match between Roman Reigns, Dean Ambrose, and Brock Lesnar at Fastlane. Reigns won the match (and the title opportunity at WrestleMania) by pinning Ambrose. However, Ambrose also received a title match in the run-up to WrestleMania, at WWE Roadblock, where Triple H defeated him to retain the championship. Prior to his triple threat match with Reigns and Lesnar at Fastlane, Ambrose lost the Intercontinental Championship to Kevin Owens in a fatal five-way match on the February 15 episode of Raw, though Ambrose was not involved in the decision.

The Usos (Jey Uso and Jimmy Uso) had another confrontation with WWE Tag Team Champions The New Day (Kofi Kingston, Big E, and Xavier Woods), after the latter team interrupted The Usos' cousin, The Rock, who appeared on the January 25 episode of Raw. The Usos forced the trio into the ring, where The Rock attacked each member with his signature moves. On the February 8 episode of Raw, The Usos and The Dudley Boyz (Bubba Ray Dudley and D-Von Dudley) defeated The New Day and Mark Henry in an eight-man tag team match. After the match, The Dudley Boyz attacked The Usos, turning heels in the process.

Also, on the January 25 episode of Raw, AJ Styles made his debut on Raw, defeating Chris Jericho. The two shook hands after the match but Jericho refused to release Styles' hand while giving him a staredown before leaving. After Styles defeated The Miz on the February 4 episode of SmackDown, Jericho challenged Styles to a rematch. Jericho defeated Styles on the episode of SmackDown of the following week, giving Styles his first loss since the Royal Rumble. On the February 15 episode of Raw, Styles challenged Jericho to a third match at Fastlane, which Jericho accepted on the following SmackDown.

Sasha Banks and Becky Lynch additionally faced each other on the January 25 episode of Raw in a match which ended in disqualification after Charlotte attacked them. After Banks confirmed her intentions of going after the Divas Championship and split from Team B.A.D. on the February 1 Raw, she faced Lynch that night in a rematch which ended with Banks winning by disqualification after Team B.A.D. members Naomi and Tamina attacked her, turning her face in the process. Lynch helped Banks fend off Naomi and Tamina, leading to a temporary and uneasy alliance between the two. This led to a tag team match pitting Banks and Lynch against Tamina and Naomi at Fastlane.

Also on the February 1 episode of Raw, Alberto Del Rio invoked his rematch clause to face Kalisto for the United States Championship at Fastlane. The match was scheduled for the Kickoff pre-show, and stipulated as a two out of three falls match.

The 2016 Royal Rumble was the last Royal Rumble to occur before the reintroduction of the brand extension in July, which again split the main roster between the Raw and SmackDown brands, where wrestlers were exclusively assigned to perform. As such, another world championship was introduced. After the WWE World Heavyweight Championship became exclusive to SmackDown and renamed to WWE Championship, the WWE Universal Championship was introduced for Raw. This was also the last Royal Rumble event to feature the Divas Championship as it was retired and replaced by a new WWE Women's Championship during the WrestleMania 32 pre-show in April.

== Results ==
No.	Results	Stipulations	Times
1^{P}	Jack Swagger and Mark Henry defeated The Ascension (Konnor and Viktor), Damien Sandow and Darren Young, and The Dudley Boyz (Bubba Ray Dudley and D-Von Dudley) by pinfall	Fatal four-way tag team match to qualify for the Royal Rumble match	8:00
2	Dean Ambrose (c) defeated Kevin Owens	Last Man Standing match for the WWE Intercontinental Championship	20:22
3	The New Day (Big E and Kofi Kingston) (c) (with Xavier Woods) defeated The Usos (Jey Uso and Jimmy Uso) by pinfall	Tag team match for the WWE Tag Team Championship	10:52
4	Kalisto defeated Alberto Del Rio (c) by pinfall	Singles match for the WWE United States Championship	11:31
5	Charlotte (c) (with Ric Flair) defeated Becky Lynch by pinfall	Singles match for the WWE Divas Championship	11:40
6	Triple H won by last eliminating Dean Ambrose	30-man Royal Rumble match for the WWE World Heavyweight Championship	1:01:42
(c) / – the champion(s) heading into the match; P / – the match was broadcast on the pre-show

=== Royal Rumble entrances and eliminations ===
– NXT

– Winner

Draw	Entrant	Order	Eliminated by	Times	Eliminations
1	Roman Reigns (c)	28	Triple H	59:48	5
2	Rusev	1	Roman Reigns	01:30	0
3	AJ Styles	11	Kevin Owens	28:58	2
4	Tyler Breeze	2	Roman Reigns and AJ Styles	01:18	0
5	Curtis Axel	3	AJ Styles	01:30	0
6	Chris Jericho	26	Dean Ambrose	51:20	1
7	Kane	9	Braun Strowman	19:07	1
8	Goldust	4	Titus O'Neil	06:18	0
9	Ryback	8	Big Show	12:37	0
10	Kofi Kingston	6	Chris Jericho	08:26	0
11	Titus O'Neil	7	Big Show	09:06	1
12	R-Truth	5	Kane	00:59	0
13	Luke Harper	19	Brock Lesnar	24:16	4
14	Stardust	14	Luke Harper	14:12	0
15	Big Show	10	Braun Strowman	04:58	2
16	Neville	13	Luke Harper	10:17	0
17	Braun Strowman	20	Brock Lesnar	18:01	5
18	Kevin Owens	12	Sami Zayn	04:58	1
19	Dean Ambrose	29	Triple H	29:57	1
20	Sami Zayn	16	Braun Strowman	04:55	1
21	Erick Rowan	17	Brock Lesnar	04:35	2
22	Mark Henry	15	The Wyatt Family (Braun Strowman, Erick Rowan, and Luke Harper)	00:47	0
23	Brock Lesnar	21	The Wyatt Family (Braun Strowman, Erick Rowan, and Luke Harper)	09:31	4
24	Jack Swagger	18	Brock Lesnar	00:15	0
25	The Miz	22	Roman Reigns	08:55	0
26	Alberto Del Rio	23	Roman Reigns	07:02	0
27	Bray Wyatt	25	Sheamus and Triple H	11:25	0
28	Dolph Ziggler	24	Triple H	07:10	0
29	Sheamus	27	Roman Reigns	08:46	1
30	Triple H	-	Winner	09:03	4

- (*) – Braun Strowman, Luke Harper, and Erick Rowan returned to the ring to eliminate Brock Lesnar, after they were eliminated by him.
