= NXT TakeOver: San Antonio =

2017 WWE Network event

- Promotional poster featuring Shinsuke Nakamura, Bobby Roode, Nikki Cross, Asuka, Peyton Royce, and Billie Kay
- Promotion: WWE
- Brand: NXT
- Date: January 28, 2017
- City: San Antonio, Texas
- Venue: Freeman Coliseum
- Attendance: 9,465

WWE event chronology
← Previous; United Kingdom Championship Tournament	Next → Royal Rumble

NXT TakeOver chronology
← Previous; Toronto	Next → Orlando

NXT TakeOver: San Antonio was a 2017 professional wrestling livestreaming event produced by WWE, held exclusively for wrestlers from the promotion's developmental brand, NXT. It was the 13th NXT TakeOver event and took place on January 28, 2017, at the Freeman Coliseum in San Antonio, Texas. The event aired exclusively on the WWE Network and was held as part of that year's Royal Rumble weekend, thus being the first NXT TakeOver to be held in January.

Five matches were contested at the event. In the main event, Bobby Roode defeated Shinsuke Nakamura to win the NXT Championship. In other prominent matches, The Authors of Pain (Akam and Rezar) defeated #DIY (Johnny Gargano and Tommaso Ciampa) to win the NXT Tag Team Championship, and Asuka defeated Billie Kay, Peyton Royce, and Nikki Cross in a fatal four-way match to retain the NXT Women's Championship.

== Production ==
=== Background ===
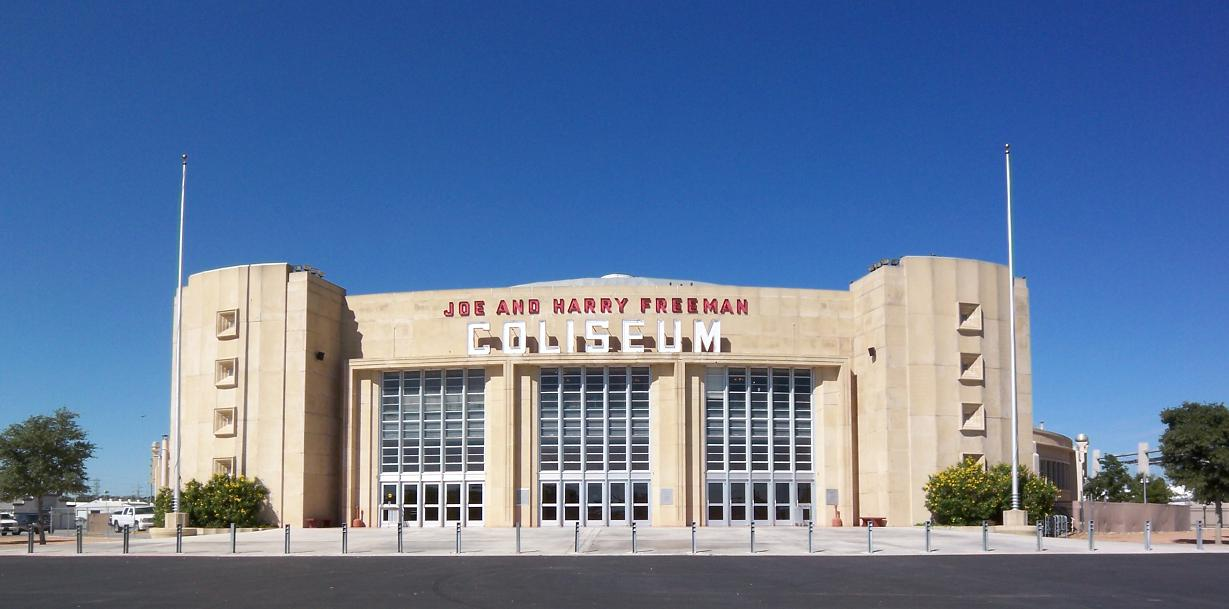
The 13th NXT TakeOver event was held at the Freeman Coliseum in San Antonio, Texas.

TakeOver was a series of professional wrestling events that began in May 2014, as WWE's developmental brand, NXT, held its second WWE Network-exclusive livestreaming event, billed as TakeOver. The "TakeOver" moniker subsequently became the branding for all of NXT's major events held periodically throughout the year. Announced on November 28, 2016, TakeOver: San Antonio was scheduled as the 13th TakeOver event and was held on Saturday, January 28, 2017, as a support show for that year's Royal Rumble for the main roster, which in turn made it the first NXT TakeOver held in January. It was held at the Freeman Coliseum and was named after the venue's city of San Antonio, Texas. Tickets went on sale on December 2, 2016.

=== Storylines ===
The event comprised five matches that resulted from scripted storylines. Results were predetermined by WWE's writers on the NXT brand, while storylines were produced on WWE's weekly television program, NXT.

On the December 14, 2016, episode of NXT, Bobby Roode defeated Oney Lorcan to qualify for a #1 contender's fatal four-way match along with Tye Dillinger, Andrade Cien Almas, and Roderick Strong. The following week, Roode defeated Dillinger, Almas, and Strong to earn a match for the NXT Championship against Shinsuke Nakamura at TakeOver: San Antonio.

At TakeOver: Toronto on November 19, 2016, #DIY (Johnny Gargano and Tommaso Ciampa) defeated The Revival (Dash Wilder and Scott Dawson) in a two out of three falls match to win the NXT Tag Team Championship. Also on that night, The Authors of Pain (Akam and Rezar) defeated TM-61 (Shane Thorne and Nick Miller) to win Dusty Rhodes Tag Team Classic. A title match between the two teams was scheduled for TakeOver: San Antonio.

On the January 11 episode of NXT, it was shown that Billie Kay and Peyton Royce had attacked Asuka earlier in the day. After Kay and Royce defeated Sarah Bridges and Macey Evans, Asuka came down and attacked both. However, both Kay and Royce overpowered Asuka. Nikki Cross then seemingly came to Asuka's aid, however, she attacked Asuka after running Kay and Royce off. The following week, a fatal four-way match for the NXT Women's Championship between the four women was scheduled for TakeOver: San Antonio.

It was announced via WWE's official website on January 25, 2017, the pre-show panel would consist of Charly Caruso, Raw announcer Corey Graves and the recent United Kingdom Championship Tournament commentator Nigel McGuinness. Graves announced on the Pre-Show that this would be his last TakeOver show as an NXT color commentator before he officially set his role as Raw color commentator. They also hosted the 2016 NXT Year-End Awards.

== Event ==
Other on-screen personnel
Role:	Name:
Commentators	Tom Phillips
Commentators	Corey Graves
Commentators	Percy Watson
Ring announcer	Mike Rome
Referees	Danilo Anfibio
Referees	Drake Wuertz
Referees	Eddie Orengo
Pre-show panel	Charly Caruso
Pre-show panel	Corey Graves
Pre-show panel	Nigel McGuinness

=== Preliminary matches ===
The event opened with Eric Young facing Tye Dillinger. Young performed "Youngblood" on Dillinger to win the match.

Next, Roderick Strong faced Andrade Cien Almas. Strong performed a "Sick Kick" on Almas to win the match.

After that, #DIY (Johnny Gargano and Tommaso Ciampa) defended the NXT Tag Team Championship against The Authors of Pain (Akam and Rezar). Akam and Rezar performed "The Last Chapter" on Ciampa to win the titles.

Moments before the fatal-four way women's match, Seth Rollins made an appearance, calling out Triple H. Triple H confronted Rollins and ordered security to eject Rollins from the arena. Rollins attacked a few security guards but was eventually taken away by them.

Later, Asuka defended the NXT Women's Championship against Nikki Cross, Billie Kay, and Peyton Royce in a fatal-four way match. Kay and Royce performed a double suplex on Cross through a table near the announce table. Royce performed a gory neckbreaker on Asuka for a near-fall. Asuka performed a spin kick on Kay and a roundhouse kick on Royce to retain the title.

=== Main event ===
In the main event, Shinsuke Nakamura defended the NXT Championship against Bobby Roode. Roode targeted Nakamura's leg throughout the match which injured him. Nakamura performed a "Kinshasa" on Roode for a near-fall. Nakamura performed a second "Kinshasa" on Roode but was unable to pin him. Roode performed a "Glorious DDT" on Nakamura for a near-fall. Roode performed a second "Glorious DDT" to win the title.

== Results ==
No.	Results	Stipulations	Times
1^{N}	Ember Moon defeated Aliyah by pinfall	Singles match	3:22
2^{N}	Tyler Bate defeated Oney Lorcan by pinfall	Singles match	5:00
3^{N}	No Way Jose defeated Elias Samson by pinfall	Singles match	6:00
4	Eric Young (with Alexander Wolfe and Killian Dain) defeated Tye Dillinger by pinfall	Singles match	10:55
5	Roderick Strong defeated Andrade "Cien" Almas by pinfall	Singles match	11:40
6	The Authors of Pain (Akam and Rezar) (with Paul Ellering) defeated #DIY (Johnny Gargano and Tommaso Ciampa) (c) by pinfall	Tag team match for the NXT Tag Team Championship	14:30
7	Asuka (c) defeated Billie Kay, Peyton Royce, and Nikki Cross by pinfall	Fatal four-way match for the NXT Women's Championship	9:55
8	Bobby Roode defeated Shinsuke Nakamura (c) by pinfall	Singles match for the NXT Championship	27:15
(c) / – the champion(s) heading into the match; N / – the match was taped for a future broadcast of NXT
