= Royal Rumble (2017) =

WWE pay-per-view and livestreaming event

- Promotional poster featuring various WWE wrestlers
- Promotion: WWE
- Brand(s): Raw; SmackDown
- Date: January 29, 2017
- City: San Antonio, Texas
- Venue: Alamodome
- Attendance: 52,020
- Tagline: Remember the Rumble

WWE event chronology
← Previous; NXT TakeOver: San Antonio	Next → Elimination Chamber

Royal Rumble chronology
← Previous; 2016	Next → 2018

The 2017 Royal Rumble was a professional wrestling pay-per-view (PPV) and livestreaming event produced by WWE, held for wrestlers from the promotion's main roster brands, Raw and SmackDown. It was the 30th annual Royal Rumble event and took place on January 29, 2017, at the Alamodome in San Antonio, Texas. This was the third Royal Rumble in San Antonio, after 1997 at the same venue and 2007 at the AT&T Center, and the fourth overall in the U.S. state of Texas, with 1989 in Houston.

The event was based around the men's Royal Rumble match, a modified 30-man battle royal in which the participants enter at timed intervals instead of all beginning in the ring at the same time. After the 2016 event deviated from the match's annual tradition of awarding a world championship match at WrestleMania, as the 2016 match itself was for the WWE World Heavyweight Championship (truncated to WWE Championship later that year), the 2017 event returned the match to its annual tradition. Due to the reintroduction of the brand split in July 2016, which added a second world championship to give each brand its own top title, the winner of the 2017 match received a match for their respective brand's world championship at WrestleMania 33, either Raw's WWE Universal Championship or SmackDown's WWE Championship. This was the first time since 2013 in which there were two eligible championships for the winner to challenge for. The main event was the 2017 Royal Rumble match, which was won by SmackDown's Randy Orton, who last eliminated Raw's Roman Reigns. This was Orton's second win, after 2009, which made him the seventh multi-time winner. This was also the last time that only a men's Royal Rumble match took place as a women's version was introduced the following year.

Seven other matches were contested at the event, including three on the Kickoff pre-show. One of the more notable matches saw John Cena defeat AJ Styles to capture his record 13th WWE Championship and his 16th overall world championship, tying Ric Flair's officially recognized record. Also on the undercard, Kevin Owens retained the WWE Universal Championship against Roman Reigns in a no disqualification match, Charlotte Flair retained the Raw Women's Championship against Bayley, and Neville defeated Rich Swann to win Raw's WWE Cruiserweight Championship. This was the first Royal Rumble to feature the Universal Championship, the Raw Women's Championship, and the Cruiserweight Championship.

== Production ==
=== Background ===
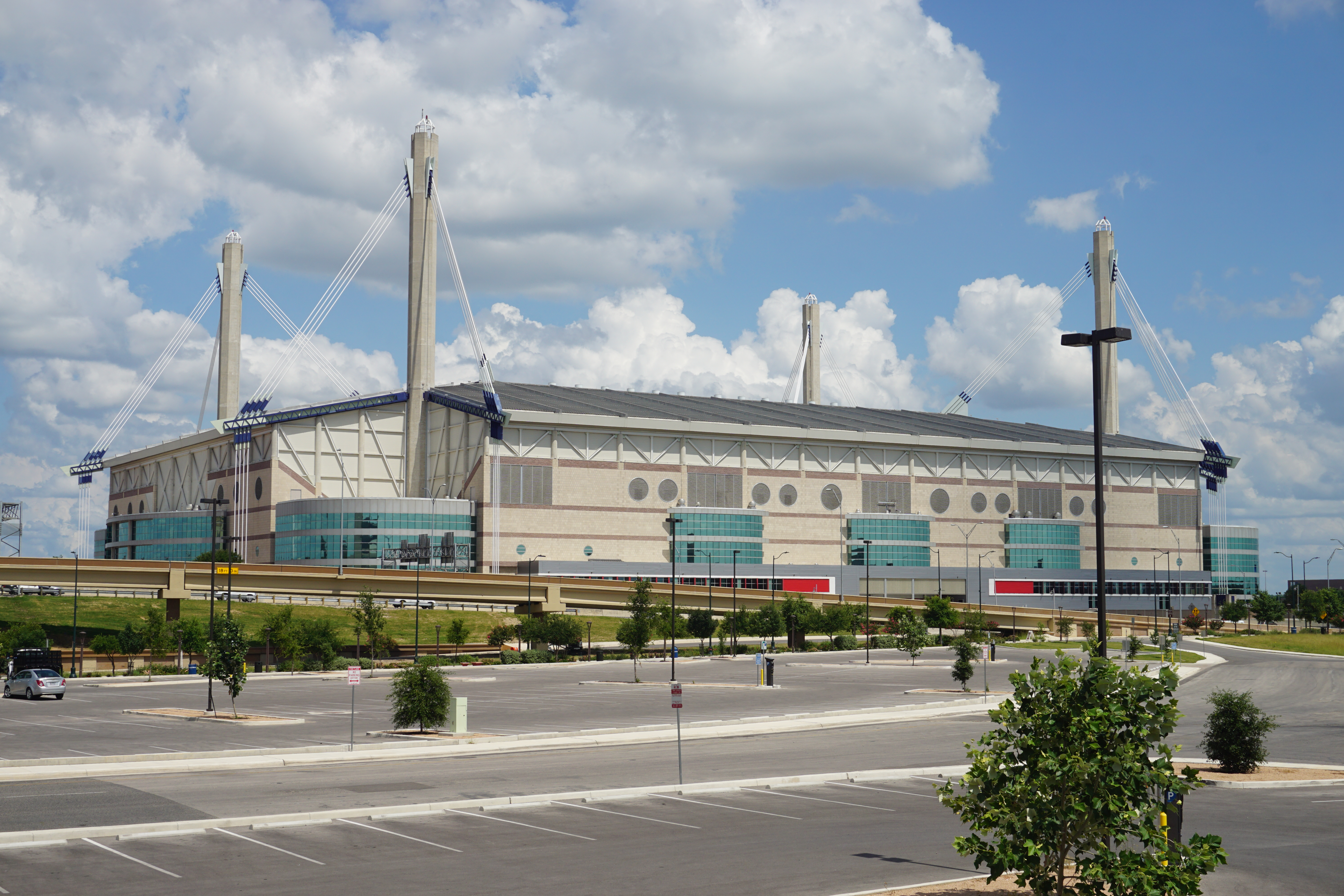
The 30th annual Royal Rumble was the second time for the event to be held at the Alamodome in San Antonio, Texas, after 1997.

The Royal Rumble is an annual professional wrestling event, produced every January by WWE since 1988; that first event was a television special before it became a pay-per-view (PPV) event beginning in 1989 and then also available via livestreaming on the WWE Network since 2015. It is one of the promotion's original four PPVs, along with WrestleMania, SummerSlam, and Survivor Series, referred to as the "Big Four". It is named after and centered on the men's Royal Rumble match. Announced on September 30, 2016, the 30th Royal Rumble event was scheduled to be held on January 29, 2017, at the Alamodome in San Antonio, Texas. This marked the second Royal Rumble to be held at this venue, after 1997, the third in San Antonio along with 2007 at the city's AT&T Center, and the fourth overall to be held in the U.S. state of Texas, as the 1989 event was in Houston. Tickets went on sale on October 14, 2016, through Ticketmaster.

The Royal Rumble match is a modified battle royal in which the participants enter at timed intervals instead of all beginning in the ring at the same time, and the match generally features 30 wrestlers. Since 1993, the winner traditionally earns a world championship match at that year's WrestleMania. After the 2016 event deviated from the match's annual tradition, as the 2016 match itself was for the WWE World Heavyweight Championship (truncated to WWE Championship later that year), the 2017 event returned the match to its annual tradition. Due to the reintroduction of the brand extension in July 2016, which again split the main roster between the Raw and SmackDown brands where wrestlers were exclusively assigned to perform, a second world championship was added to give each brand its own top championship. As a result, the winner of the 2017 Royal Rumble match earned a match for their respective brand's world championship at WrestleMania 33: Raw's WWE Universal Championship or SmackDown's WWE Championship. This made it the first Royal Rumble to feature the Universal Championship, following its introduction on Raw in July 2016 after the WWE Championship became exclusive to SmackDown. This was subsequently also the first time in which two world championships were eligible to be challenged for by the winner of the titular match since the 2013 event.

=== Storylines ===
The event comprised eight matches, including three on the Kickoff pre-show, that resulted from scripted storylines. Results were predetermined by WWE's writers on the Raw and SmackDown brands, while storylines were produced on WWE's weekly television shows, Monday Night Raw, SmackDown Live, and the cruiserweight-exclusive 205 Live.

After defeating Brock Lesnar at Survivor Series in his first match in 12 years, Goldberg declared himself the first entrant in the Royal Rumble match on the November 21, 2016, episode of Raw. The next week, Lesnar's manager Paul Heyman stated that Lesnar would also compete in the Royal Rumble as he "has something to prove", having been "humiliated" by Goldberg. Over the following weeks, The New Day (Big E, Kofi Kingston, and Xavier Woods), Chris Jericho, Braun Strowman, Baron Corbin, The Undertaker, Intercontinental Champion Dean Ambrose, The Miz, Dolph Ziggler, and Raw Tag Team Champions Cesaro and Sheamus announced their participation in the match. On the January 16, 2017, episode of Raw, Titus O'Neil challenged The New Day for one of their spots. Big E accepted the challenge and defeated O'Neil. Bray Wyatt, Randy Orton, Luke Harper, and Big Show also announced themselves as participants in the Royal Rumble. Seth Rollins had confirmed his entry via Twitter on January 9, but lost his spot to Sami Zayn on the January 23 episode of Raw, after a distraction by Triple H's music. Later in the night, Big Cass and Rusev announced their participation in the match. On the January 24 episode of SmackDown, Mojo Rawley won a 10-man battle royal to qualify for the match. The remaining eight spots were revealed at the event during the match.

At Roadblock: End of the Line on December 18, 2016, Kevin Owens retained the WWE Universal Championship against United States Champion Roman Reigns after Chris Jericho attacked Owens with a Codebreaker, giving Owens the win by disqualification. After the match, Jericho, who lost to Seth Rollins earlier that night, revealed he planned the disqualification so that Owens would win and retain the title. Reigns and Rollins attacked both Owens and Jericho by performing Double Powerbombs on both men through broadcast tables. The next night on Raw, Raw General Manager Mick Foley interrupted Jericho and Owens celebrating, announcing that Reigns would get a rematch against Owens for the Universal Championship at Royal Rumble, and Jericho would be suspended above the ring inside of a shark cage to ensure that he would not interfere in the match. Foley threatened that if Jericho does not enter the cage, he would be fired. Both were then put into a tag team match against Reigns and Rollins. The latter two won by disqualification after Braun Strowman came out and attacked them. The following week, Reigns retained the United States Championship against Owens after Rollins attacked an interfering Jericho. The following week, Reigns again retained the United States Championship, this time against Jericho. Owens was banned from ringside during the match as a result of losing to Rollins earlier that night. The following week, Reigns again defended the United States Title, this time in a handicap match against both Jericho and Owens. After Jericho and Owens double-teamed Reigns, Jericho scored the pinfall to become the United States Champion. The next week, after the opening segment involving Owens, Jericho, Reigns, Rollins, Strowman (who had faced Rollins in previous weeks), Sami Zayn (who attacked Strowman during his recent matches), and Brock Lesnar ended in a brawl, a six-man tag team match was scheduled for the main event, with Owens, Jericho, and Strowman winning against Reigns, Rollins, and Zayn. After the match, Owens powerbombed Reigns through a broadcast table. On the final Raw before Royal Rumble, Reigns faced Jericho in a rematch for the United States Championship, but Jericho was disqualified when Owens interfered, attacking Reigns. Owens and Jericho attempted to put Reigns in the shark cage, but Reigns retaliated and locked Owens in it, had it lifted above the ring, and then performed a "Superman Punch" and a spear on Jericho. Afterwards, it was announced that the match at Royal Rumble would be a no disqualification match.

At TLC: Tables, Ladders & Chairs on December 4, 2016, AJ Styles retained the then-WWE World Championship against Dean Ambrose in a Tables, Ladders, and Chairs match. On the December 13 episode of SmackDown, Dolph Ziggler defeated Ambrose, The Miz, and Luke Harper in a four-way elimination match to earn a match for the renamed WWE Championship on the December 27 episode. On the December 20 episode, however, Baron Corbin confronted Ziggler, calling him undeserving of a title shot and stated that Ziggler only won because he was not there. The two then had a match with Ziggler's title shot on the line, but it ended in a double count-out. Styles then attacked both Ziggler and Corbin with a chair. SmackDown General Manager Daniel Bryan then scheduled a triple threat for the WWE Championship between the three for the December 27 episode. That episode, John Cena returned from a near three-month hiatus and challenged the winner for the title at Royal Rumble. After Styles retained the WWE Championship, Cena came out, looking ready to fight, but instead congratulated him with a handshake.

At Roadblock: End of the Line, Charlotte Flair defeated Sasha Banks in overtime of a 30-minute Iron Man match to win her fourth Raw Women's Championship, as well as ending their long feud. On the following Raw, Banks, in a knee brace and on a crutch, came to the ring to congratulate Flair but instead was attacked by Nia Jax. Later, Flair came out and declared herself to be the greatest female wrestler of all time, but Bayley interrupted Flair, reminding her that Bayley had beaten her twice on previous occasions. Bayley then pinned Flair in an impromptu non-title match. However, as replays showed that Flair had her shoulder up before the three count, Flair faced Bayley in another non-title match the following week, but this time with Dana Brooke as guest referee, who gave a fast three count to give Flair the victory. On the January 2, 2017, episode of Raw, Bayley defeated Jax due to a distraction by Banks to become the number one contender for the Raw Women's Championship at Royal Rumble. Backstage the following week, Flair and Jax attacked Bayley and Banks and later defeated them in a tag team match. On January 23, after a confrontation between the two, Banks was scheduled to face Jax on the Royal Rumble Kickoff pre-show.

At Roadblock: End of the Line, Rich Swann retained the WWE Cruiserweight Championship in a triple threat match against T. J. Perkins and The Brian Kendrick. After the match, Neville appeared and attacked both Swann and Perkins, turning heel. The following night on Raw, Neville stated his intention to take out the entire cruiserweight division, and proclaimed himself to be "King of the Cruiserweights". Swann questioned Neville's actions, but was then attacked by Neville and Kendrick, who sided with Neville. Perkins tried to help Swann, but was overpowered by Neville. The next night on 205 Live, Neville and Kendrick defeated Perkins and Swann in a tag team match. The following Raw, after Neville defeated Perkins, he challenged Swann to a match for the following 205 Live. Later, after Swann defeated Ariya Daivari, he accepted the challenge, but was immediately attacked by Neville. On 205 Live, Neville defeated Swann in a non-title match, and proceeded to attack Swann again. On the January 9, 2017, episode of Raw, after defeating Lince Dorado, Neville proceeded to attack Dorado more until Swann came to his aid and fended off Neville. On the following 205 Live, after Swann defeated Tony Nese, Swann called out Neville, but Neville refused to face Swann unless it was for the Cruiserweight Championship. Swann then accepted Neville's challenge for the title at the Royal Rumble. The following Raw, Neville attacked Swann before his match with Nese, and Nese joined Neville in the attack.

At Roadblock: End of the Line, Cesaro and Sheamus defeated The New Day's Big E and Kofi Kingston to become the new Raw Tag Team Champions, as well as ending New Day's record-long reign. The following night on Raw, Mick Foley congratulated Cesaro and Sheamus and presented them with a new set of championship belts. The New Day also congratulated them, but were interrupted by Luke Gallows and Karl Anderson. Big E and Kingston then teamed with Cesaro and Sheamus to defeat Gallows and Anderson and The Shining Stars (Primo and Epico). The following week, The New Day (Kingston and Xavier Woods) invoked their rematch clause for the titles, but were unsuccessful. Cesaro and Sheamus then began a rivalry with Gallows and Anderson. On the January 2 episode of Raw, Anderson defeated Cesaro. The following week, Sheamus defeated Gallows. On the January 16 episode, Cesaro and Sheamus defended the Raw Tag Team Championship against Gallows and Anderson. After the first referee was accidentally knocked out by Sheamus, another referee came out and called the winning pinfall for Gallows and Anderson. However, the original referee reversed the decision and made it a disqualification win for Gallows and Anderson, thus Cesaro and Sheamus retained the titles. A title rematch between the two teams with two referees was then scheduled for the Royal Rumble Kickoff pre-show.

At TLC: Tables, Ladders & Chairs, Alexa Bliss defeated Becky Lynch in a tables match to win the SmackDown Women's Championship. Subsequently, Bliss avoided a rematch against Lynch but lost a non-title match against "newcomer" La Luchadora, who made the champion submit to the Dis-arm-her and then unmasked as Lynch. Over the next few weeks, an unknown villainess dressed as La Luchadora began to aid Bliss in matches against Lynch, including her successful title defense in a Steel Cage match in the main event of the January 17, 2017 episode of SmackDown, where La Luchadora was unmasked as the returning Mickie James. The following week, James explained that she became forgotten due to the Women's Revolution; Lynch then came out, but was ambushed by Bliss. Nikki Bella and Natalya had entered a heated feud after Carmella had claimed that Natalya had attacked Bella at Survivor Series in order to take her place in her match. After denying the accusations at first, Natalya admitted to the attack on the December 20 episode of SmackDown, revealing pent up jealousy of The Bella Twins, resulting in brawls between the two in the following weeks. One of these brawls, on the January 24 episode, resulted in a match between Natalya and Naomi being canceled. Naomi, left without an opponent, then issued an open challenge. Bliss came out, not to accept the challenge, but to insult Naomi. A six-woman tag team match was then scheduled for the Royal Rumble Kickoff pre-show, putting Lynch, Bella, and Naomi against Bliss, James, and Natalya.

== Event ==
Other on-screen personnel
Role:	Name:
English commentators	Michael Cole (Raw/Royal Rumble match)
English commentators	Corey Graves (Raw/Cruiserweight title match/Royal Rumble match)
English commentators	Byron Saxton (Raw)
English commentators	Mauro Ranallo (SmackDown/Cruiserweight title match)
English commentators	John "Bradshaw" Layfield (SmackDown)
English commentators	David Otunga (SmackDown)
English commentators	Tom Phillips (SmackDown)
English commentators	Austin Aries (Cruiserweight title match)
English commentators	Jerry Lawler (Royal Rumble match)
Spanish commentators	Carlos Cabrera
Spanish commentators	Marcelo Rodríguez
German commentators	Holger Böschen
German commentators	Manu Thiele
Ring announcers	Greg Hamilton (SmackDown)
Ring announcers	JoJo (Raw/Royal Rumble match)
Referees	Jason Ayers
Referees	Shawn Bennett
Referees	John Cone
Referees	Dan Engler
Referees	Darrick Moore
Referees	Chad Patton
Referees	Charles Robinson
Referees	Ryan Tran
Referees	Rod Zapata
Backstage interviewers	Charly Caruso
Pre-show panel	Renee Young
Pre-show panel	Booker T
Pre-show panel	Jerry Lawler
Pre-show panel	Shawn Michaels
Pre-show panel	Austin Aries
Pre-show panel	Peter Rosenberg

=== Pre-show ===
During the Royal Rumble Kickoff pre-show, Becky Lynch, Nikki Bella, and Naomi faced SmackDown Women's Champion Alexa Bliss, Mickie James, and Natalya. Naomi performed a split-legged moonsault on Bliss to win the match.

Next, Cesaro and Sheamus defended the Raw Tag Team Championship against Luke Gallows and Karl Anderson with two referees assigned to the match. Anderson pinned Cesaro with a roll-up whilst holding his tights to win the titles.

After that, Nia Jax faced Sasha Banks. Jax performed a pop-up Samoan drop on Banks for the win.

=== Preliminary matches ===
The actual pay-per-view opened with Charlotte Flair defending the Raw Women's Championship against Bayley. In the end, Charlotte performed a Natural Selection on Bayley onto the ring apron and pinned her to retain the title.

Next, Kevin Owens defended the WWE Universal Championship against Roman Reigns in a No Disqualification match, with United States Champion Chris Jericho suspended above the ring in a shark cage. Outside the ring, Owens performed a frog splash on Reigns through a table and scored a nearfall. Jericho threw a pair of brass knuckles to Owens, which Owens used to perform a Superman Punch on Reigns for a nearfall. As Owens attempted a powerbomb through a chair, Reigns countered into a Samoan Drop through the chair on Owens for a nearfall. Reigns performed a Superman punch on Owens for a nearfall. Reigns attempted a Spear but Owens countered into a stunner on Reigns for a nearfall. Reigns performed a Superman punch on Owens, causing Owens to fall through chairs stacked outside the ring, which was followed by a powerbomb through an announce table to Owens. Braun Strowman interfered, attacking Reigns with a chokeslam onto an announce table and a running powerslam through a table positioned in the corner. Owens pinned Reigns to retain the title.

After that, Rich Swann defended the WWE Cruiserweight Championship against Neville. Neville forced Swann to submit to the Rings of Saturn to win the title.

In the fourth match, AJ Styles defended the WWE Championship against John Cena. Cena performed an Attitude Adjustment on Styles for a nearfall. Styles performed a Phenomenal Forearm on Cena for a nearfall. A trade of reversals of Styles' Calf Crusher and Cena's STF followed. Styles applied the STF on Cena but Cena escaped and applied the figure-four leglock on Styles, which Styles turned into a cross armbreaker but Cena escaped. Styles performed a Styles Clash on Cena for a nearfall. Cena performed a Super Attitude Adjustment on Styles for a nearfall. Cena attempted another Attitude Adjustment, but Styles countered and performed a Styles Clash. Instead of attempting a pin on Cena, Styles attempted a Phenomenal Forearm, but Cena countered into a third Attitude Adjustment, which was immediately followed by a fourth Attitude Adjustment on Styles to win the title for his record thirteenth WWE Championship. With this win, Cena tied Ric Flair's record of 16 recognized world championship reigns. However, the authenticity of this supposed record-tying has been called into question. Dave Meltzer has stated that Flair is at minimum a 19-time world champion, writing "to me, the debate on Flair is whether he's a 19-time champion or a 20-time champion, but you can very much argue any number from 19 minimum to 23 maximum. In this day and age where the Internet is full of this information, it's kind of hard to cling to the 16 number, although "16" is the WWE mythology and it's hard to change from something they've pushed for so long."

=== Main event ===
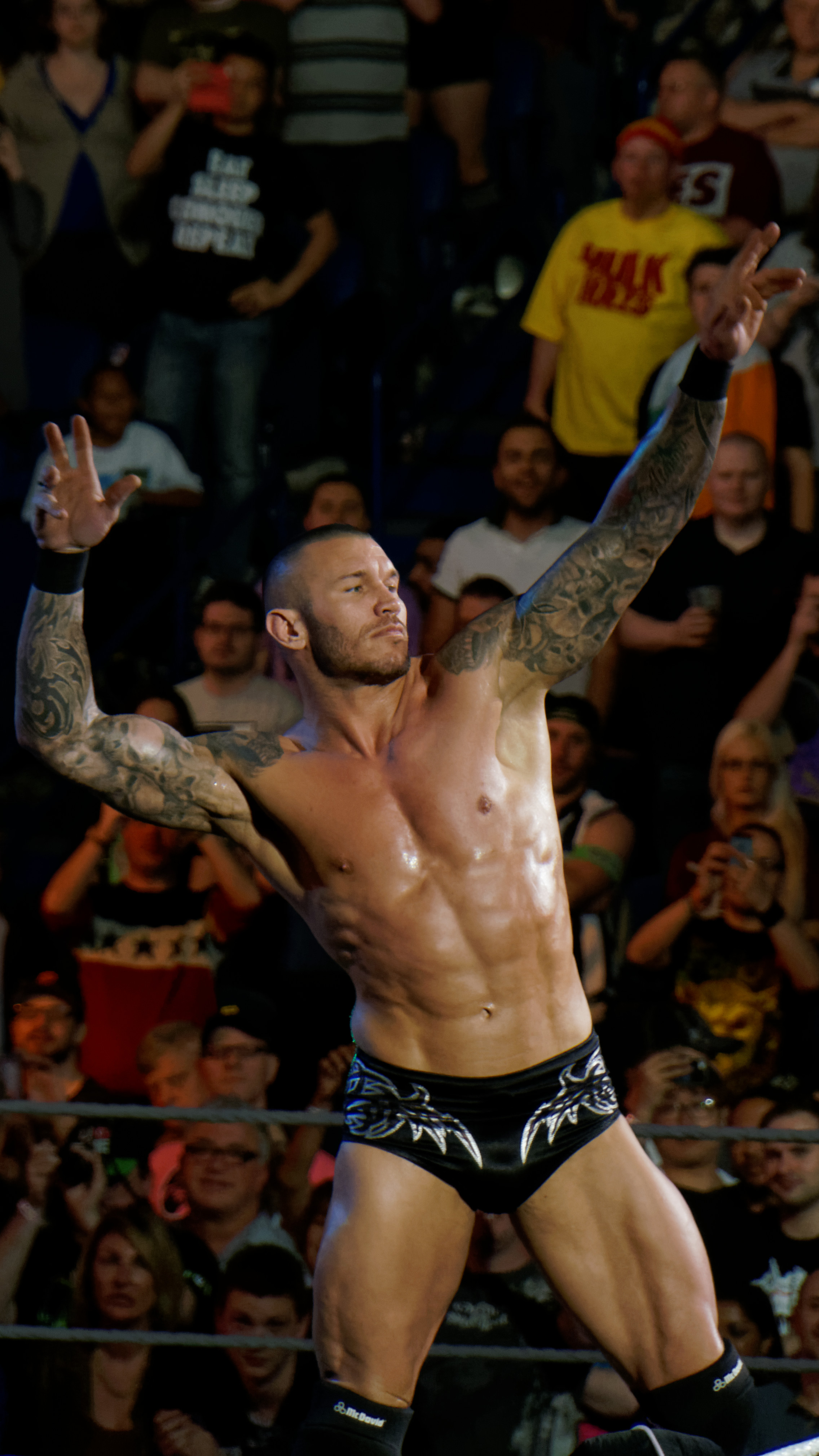
Randy Orton won the 2017 Royal Rumble match. This was his second win, after 2009, which made him the seventh multi-time winner.

The main event was the traditional 30-man Royal Rumble match with the winner earning a world championship match at WrestleMania 33. Big Cass and Chris Jericho began the match as the first and second entrants, respectively. Jack Gallagher, who was the fifth entrant, used his umbrella to attack Mark Henry, but was eliminated by Henry. The seventh entrant, Braun Strowman, scored the most eliminations with seven, eliminating Cass, Kalisto, Mojo Rawley, Mark Henry, Big Show, NXT's surprise entrant Tye Dillinger, and James Ellsworth. Baron Corbin, the thirteenth entrant, eventually eliminated Strowman. Wyatt family members Bray Wyatt, Randy Orton, and Luke Harper entered as the twenty-first, twenty-third, and twenty-fifth entrants, respectively. Wyatt tried to maintain peace between his family, but Harper attacked Wyatt and Orton. Brock Lesnar entered as the twenty-sixth entrant, executed F5s on Orton and The Miz, and eliminated Intercontinental Champion Dean Ambrose (the twelfth entrant), Dolph Ziggler (the twenty-fourth entrant), and Enzo Amore (the twenty-seventh entrant). Goldberg entered as the twenty-eighth entrant, quickly eliminated Lesnar after delivering a spear, and then eliminated Rusev and Harper. The Undertaker entered as the twenty-ninth entrant, eliminating Baron Corbin, Goldberg, The Miz, and Sami Zayn, however, he was eliminated by Roman Reigns, the thirtieth entrant.

Jericho, Wyatt, Orton, and Reigns were the final four. Reigns eliminated Jericho by executing a Superman Punch to knock Jericho off the top rope, and after Wyatt attempted Sister Abigail on Reigns, Reigns countered into a Superman Punch and eliminated Wyatt. As Reigns attempted a Spear on Orton, Orton countered into an RKO and eliminated Reigns to win the match and earn himself a match for his brand's WWE Championship at WrestleMania 33. As a result of his win, Orton became a two-time Royal Rumble winner (the first time was in 2009), and the seventh wrestler to win multiple Royal Rumble matches.

== Aftermath ==
The 2017 event would be the last Royal Rumble in which only the men's Royal Rumble match took place, as the women's Royal Rumble match was introduced the following year.

=== Raw ===
The following night on Raw, Braun Strowman revealed that he had helped Kevin Owens retain the WWE Universal Championship because of his dislike for Roman Reigns and because Owens had promised him a title shot. Owens denied this before Strowman showed footage confirming his claim. Raw General Manager Mick Foley then scheduled the match, which ended in no contest when Reigns interfered and attacked Strowman. Chris Jericho also faced Sami Zayn in a non-title match and lost. The following week, Strowman was scheduled to face Reigns at Fastlane on March 5, and Jericho retained the United States Championship against Zayn. In retaliation for being eliminated by Reigns during the Royal Rumble match, The Undertaker attacked Reigns with a Chokeslam on the March 6 episode, and a match between the two was scheduled for the main event of WrestleMania 33.

After being humiliated by Goldberg again, Brock Lesnar and Paul Heyman appeared on Raw to challenge Goldberg to one final match at WrestleMania 33. Goldberg appeared the following week and accepted Lesnar's challenge. Goldberg also challenged Kevin Owens for the WWE Universal Championship at Fastlane, which was accepted by Chris Jericho on behalf of Owens and made official. This resulted in Owens turning on Jericho on the February 13 episode and hospitalizing him.

Also on Raw, Bayley, Cesaro, and Sheamus teamed up to face Charlotte Flair, Luke Gallows, and Karl Anderson in a six-person mixed tag team match where Bayley pinned Charlotte. Also, Sasha Banks had a rematch with Nia Jax, who dominated and defeated Banks again, exploiting her injured knee. Bayley then defeated Flair in a rematch on the February 13 episode to become the Raw Women's Champion. The following week, Charlotte invoked her rematch clause for Fastlane, and Banks was scheduled for another match with Jax at Fastlane. Also, on the February 6 episode, Cesaro and Sheamus invoked their rematch clause for the Raw Tag Team Championship, but the match ended in a disqualification thanks to interference from Enzo Amore and Big Cass. Amore and Cass defeated Cesaro and Sheamus on the February 20 episode to become the number one contenders at Fastlane.

Seth Rollins, who had been banned from the Royal Rumble, confronted Stephanie McMahon about her husband Triple H and Rollins' appearance a couple of nights prior at NXT TakeOver: San Antonio. Stephanie then revealed that Triple H would be on Raw later that night. Triple H showed up and called out Rollins. As Rollins made his way to the ring, NXT call-up Samoa Joe made his main roster debut and attacked Rollins on behalf of Triple H. Joe's attack on Rollins re-injured the same knee that had sidelined him for six months. It was reported that Rollins would be out of action for up to eight weeks and could possibly miss WrestleMania. Rollins appeared on the February 27 episode of Raw to give an update. Triple H also appeared and confronted Rollins, who declared that he would be at WrestleMania.

Neville came out for a "coronation" on becoming the new WWE Cruiserweight Champion. He was interrupted by Rich Swann, who stated that they will have a rematch before a brawl ensued. The following night on 205 Live, it was revealed that Swann was injured during the confrontation, and a fatal five-way elimination match was scheduled for the following 205 Live to determine the number one contender for Neville at Fastlane, which was won by Jack Gallagher.

=== SmackDown ===
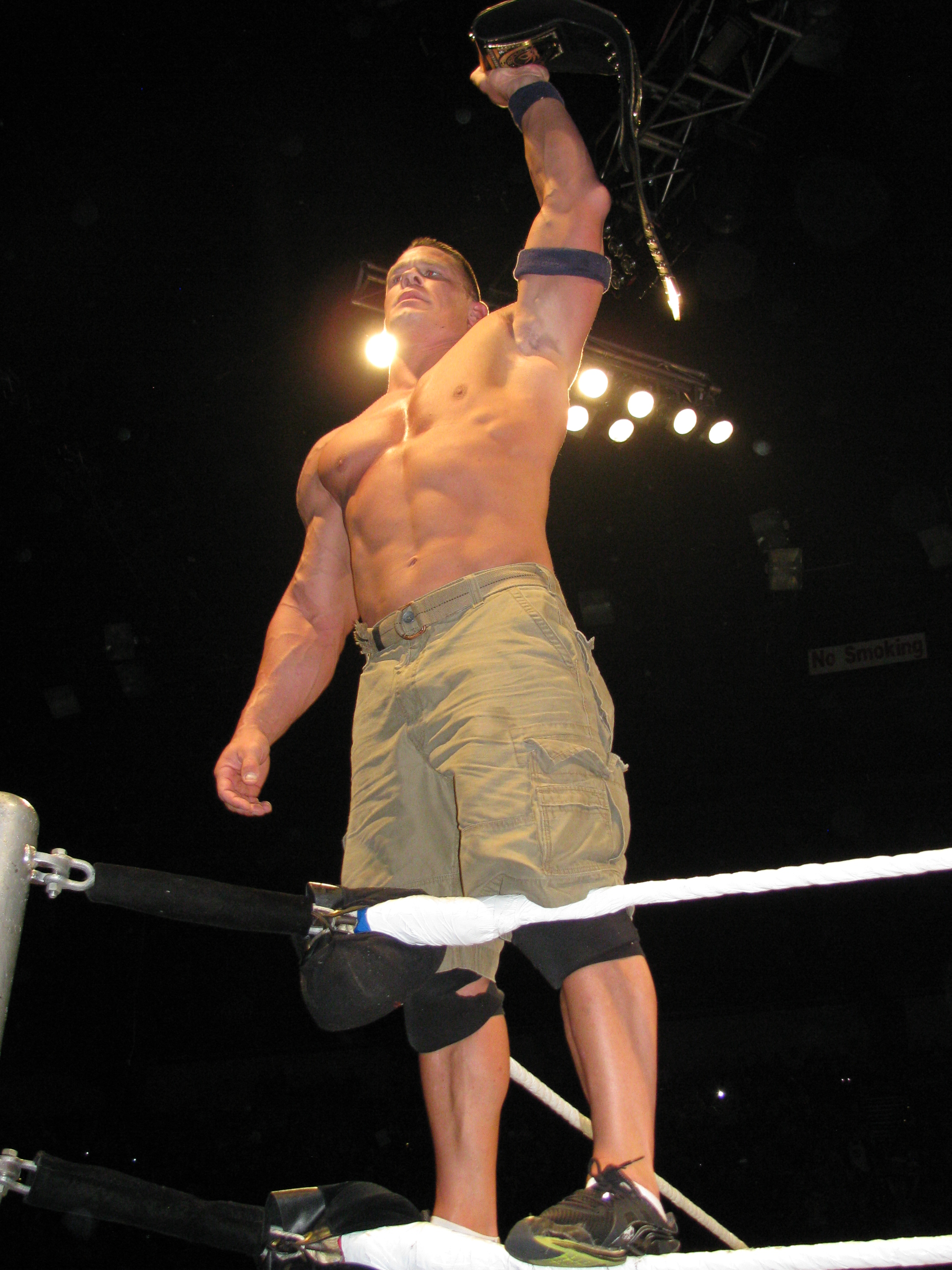
John Cena defeated AJ Styles to become a record 13-time WWE Champion and 16-time overall world champion, a feat previously only accomplished by Ric Flair as recognized by WWE.

On the following episode of SmackDown, Royal Rumble winner Randy Orton warned new WWE Champion John Cena that if he was still champion at WrestleMania, he would take the title from him. Orton then pinned Cena in a tag team match, but lost to Cena the following week due to distraction by Luke Harper. Orton was scheduled to face Harper at Elimination Chamber on February 12.

A couple of weeks prior to the Royal Rumble, SmackDown Commissioner Shane McMahon announced that the main event of SmackDown's next pay-per-view would be an Elimination Chamber match for the WWE Championship. On January 30, after losing the title, it was confirmed that AJ Styles would be entering the match. On the following episode of SmackDown, Shane McMahon and Daniel Bryan said that Styles would eventually get a one-on-one rematch for the title, and then revealed the other participants in the Elimination Chamber match: Bray Wyatt, Baron Corbin, The Miz, and Dean Ambrose.

Becky Lynch and Naomi had another tag team match against Alexa Bliss and Mickie James, where Naomi again pinned Bliss. Afterwards on Talking Smack, Bliss was scheduled to defend the SmackDown Women's Championship against Naomi at Elimination Chamber. Also, Daniel Bryan announced that Natalya would face Nikki Bella at Elimination Chamber to settle their differences. The following week, Lynch was scheduled to face James at Elimination Chamber.

== Results ==
No.	Results	Stipulations	Times
1^{P}	Naomi, Nikki Bella, and Becky Lynch defeated Alexa Bliss, Mickie James, and Natalya by pinfall	Six-woman tag team match	9:35
2^{P}	Luke Gallows and Karl Anderson defeated Cesaro and Sheamus (c) by pinfall	Tag team match for the WWE Raw Tag Team Championship; Two referees were assigned to the match.	10:30
3^{P}	Nia Jax defeated Sasha Banks by pinfall	Singles match	5:10
4	Charlotte Flair (c) defeated Bayley by pinfall	Singles match for the WWE Raw Women's Championship	13:05
5	Kevin Owens (c) defeated Roman Reigns by pinfall	No Disqualification match for the WWE Universal Championship; Chris Jericho was suspended above the ring in a shark cage.	22:55
6	Neville defeated Rich Swann (c) by submission	Singles match for the WWE Cruiserweight Championship	14:00
7	John Cena defeated AJ Styles (c) by pinfall	Singles match for the WWE Championship	24:10
8	Randy Orton won by last eliminating Roman Reigns	30-man Royal Rumble match for a world championship match at WrestleMania 33	1:02:07
(c) / – the champion(s) heading into the match; P / – the match was broadcast on the pre-show

=== Royal Rumble entrances and eliminations ===
– Raw
– SmackDown
– NXT
– Winner

Draw	Entrant	Brand	Order	Eliminated by	Time	Eliminations
1	Big Cass	Raw	3	Braun Strowman	09:57	0
2	Chris Jericho	Raw	27	Roman Reigns	1:00:13	2
3	Kalisto	SmackDown	4	Braun Strowman	08:17	0
4	Mojo Rawley	SmackDown	2	Braun Strowman	06:16	0
5	Jack Gallagher	Raw	1	Mark Henry	03:20	0
6	Mark Henry	Raw	5	Braun Strowman	03:17	1
7	Braun Strowman	Raw	9	Baron Corbin	13:11	7
8	Sami Zayn	Raw	25	The Undertaker	46:55	0
9	Big Show	SmackDown	6	Braun Strowman	01:42	0
10	Tye Dillinger	NXT	8	Braun Strowman	05:27	0
11	James Ellsworth	SmackDown	7	Braun Strowman	00:15	0
12	Dean Ambrose	SmackDown	16	Brock Lesnar	26:55	0
13	Baron Corbin	SmackDown	21	The Undertaker	32:39	1
14	Kofi Kingston	Raw	10	Cesaro & Sheamus	16:13	0
15	The Miz	SmackDown	24	The Undertaker	32:44	0
16	Sheamus	Raw	14	Chris Jericho	12:13	3
17	Big E	Raw	12	Cesaro & Sheamus	09:46	0
18	Rusev	Raw	20	Goldberg	22:31	0
19	Cesaro	Raw	13	Chris Jericho	06:44	3
20	Xavier Woods	Raw	11	Cesaro & Sheamus	04:47	0
21	Bray Wyatt	SmackDown	28	Roman Reigns	24:11	0
22	Apollo Crews	SmackDown	15	Luke Harper	05:46	0
23	Randy Orton	SmackDown	—	Winner	20:52	1
24	Dolph Ziggler	SmackDown	17	Brock Lesnar	04:21	0
25	Luke Harper	SmackDown	22	Goldberg	09:56	1
26	Brock Lesnar	Raw	19	Goldberg	04:30	3
27	Enzo Amore	Raw	18	Brock Lesnar	00:18	0
28	Goldberg	Unaffiliated	23	The Undertaker	03:21	3
29	The Undertaker	Unaffiliated	26	Roman Reigns	08:46	4
30	Roman Reigns	Raw	29	Randy Orton	05:05	3
