= Royal Rumble (2015) =

WWE pay-per-view and livestreaming event

- Promotional poster featuring Brock Lesnar, John Cena, Seth Rollins, and various other WWE wrestlers
- Promotion: WWE
- Date: January 25, 2015
- City: Philadelphia, Pennsylvania
- Venue: Wells Fargo Center
- Attendance: 17,164
- Buy rate: 145,000 (excluding WWE Network views)

WWE event chronology
← Previous; TLC: Tables, Ladders & Chairs	Next → NXT TakeOver: Rival

Royal Rumble chronology
← Previous; 2014	Next → 2016

The 2015 Royal Rumble was a professional wrestling pay-per-view (PPV) and livestreaming event produced by WWE. It was the 28th annual Royal Rumble event and took place on January 25, 2015, at the Wells Fargo Center in Philadelphia, Pennsylvania, which was the second Royal Rumble event held at the venue, after 2004 when it was known as Wachovia Center. The event was based around the men's Royal Rumble match, a modified 30-man battle royal in which the participants enter at timed intervals instead of all beginning in the ring at the same time and the winner received a WWE World Heavyweight Championship match at WrestleMania 31.

Six matches were contested at the event, including one on the Kickoff pre-show. The main event was the 2015 Royal Rumble match, which was won by Roman Reigns, who last eliminated Rusev. Also on the event's card, The Usos (Jey Uso and Jimmy Uso) defeated The Miz and Damien Mizdow to retain the WWE Tag Team Championship, while WWE World Heavyweight Champion Brock Lesnar successfully defended his title against Seth Rollins and John Cena in a triple threat match in the penultimate match.

Like the previous year's event, the 2015 Royal Rumble was marred by a strongly negative audience reaction to the Royal Rumble match and its winner Roman Reigns. However, the WWE World Heavyweight Championship triple threat match received high praise from critics and fans. This was also the first Royal Rumble to livestream on the WWE Network, which launched in February 2014. The event received 145,000 pay-per-view buys (excluding WWE Network views), down from the previous year's 467,000 buys.

== Production ==
=== Background ===
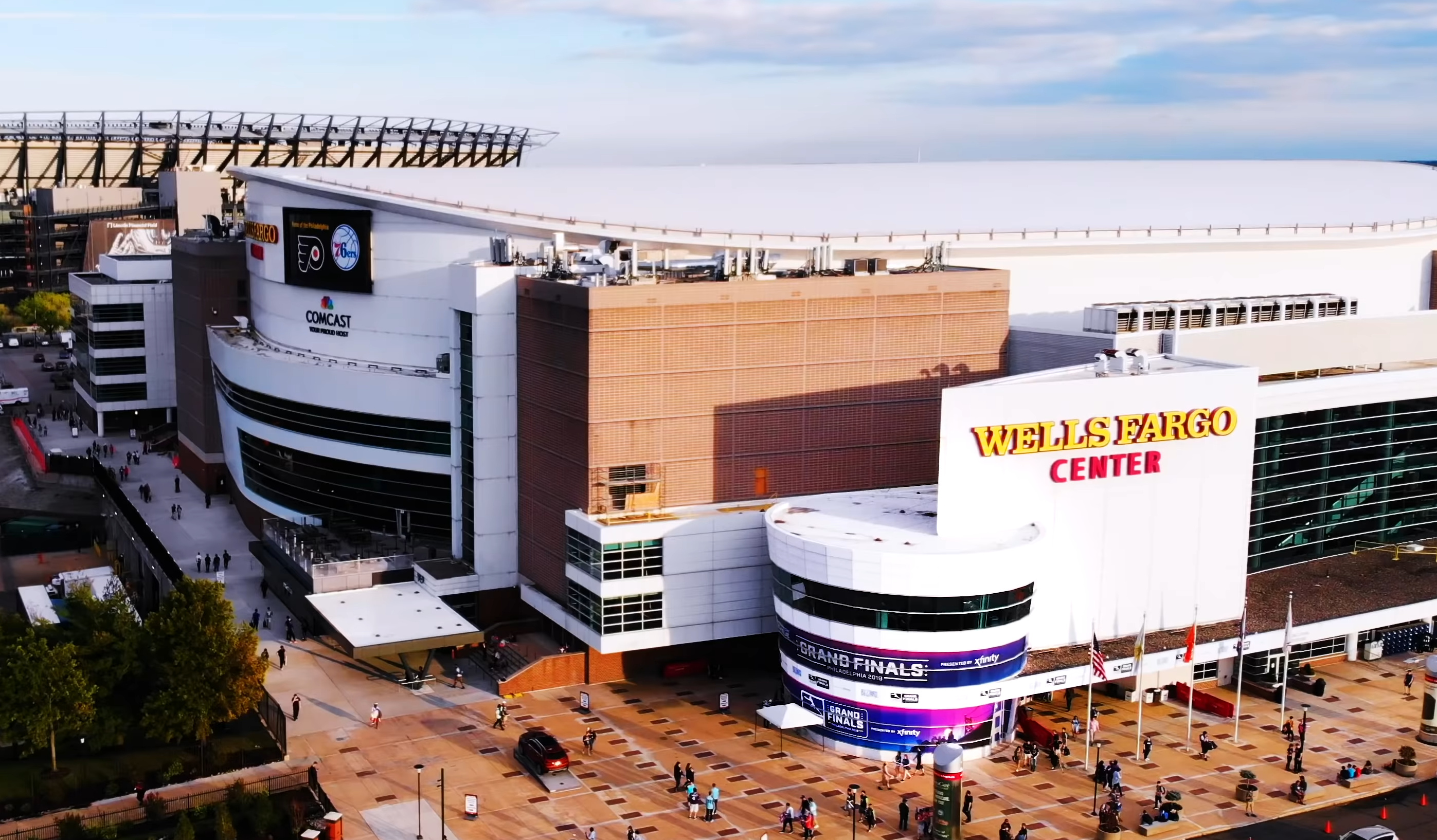
The 28th annual Royal Rumble was the second time for the event to be held at the Wells Fargo Center in Philadelphia, Pennsylvania, after 2004 when it was known as the Wachovia Center.

The Royal Rumble is an annual professional wrestling event, produced every January by WWE since 1988; that first event was a television special before it became a pay-per-view (PPV) event beginning in 1989. It is one of the promotion's original four pay-per-views, along with WrestleMania, SummerSlam, and Survivor Series, referred to as the "Big Four". It is named after and centered on the men's Royal Rumble match.

Announced on October 7, 2014, the 28th Royal Rumble event was scheduled to be held on January 25, 2015, at the Wells Fargo Center in Philadelphia, Pennsylvania, marking the second Royal Rumble to be held at this venue, after the 2004 event when it was formerly known as the Wachovia Center; the arena changed its name to Wells Fargo Center in 2010. In addition to airing on traditional pay-per-view, this was the first Royal Rumble to livestream on the WWE Network, which launched in February 2014.

The Royal Rumble match is a modified battle royal in which the participants enter at timed intervals instead of all beginning in the ring at the same time, and the match generally features 30 wrestlers. Since 1993, the winner earns a world championship match at that year's WrestleMania. For 2015, the winner earned a WWE World Heavyweight Championship match at WrestleMania 31.

=== Storylines ===
The event comprised six matches, including one on the Kickoff pre-show, that resulted from scripted storylines. Results were predetermined by WWE's writers, while storylines were produced on WWE's weekly television shows, Raw and SmackDown.

At SummerSlam, Brock Lesnar defeated John Cena and won the WWE World Heavyweight Championship. Cena would receive his rematch the following month at Night of Champions which he would win by disqualification after Seth Rollins interfered and attempted to cash-in his Money in the Bank contract. At the next event, Hell in a Cell, Cena defeated Authority member Randy Orton in a Hell in a Cell match to earn a future title shot at Lesnar. The Authority was then removed from power after losing the 5-on-5 Survivor Series elimination match at Survivor Series with Cena being the only one who could bring them back if he chose to. At TLC: Tables, Ladders and Chairs, Cena faced Rollins in a tables match which he won to retain his number one contender status. Later in the event, it was announced that Cena would face Lesnar for the title at the Royal Rumble. On the final Raw of 2014, Rollins attacked special guest host Edge and threatened to perform a Curb Stomp on him if Cena did not reinstate The Authority. Cena came down to save Edge but reluctantly brought The Authority back after Rollins held Edge hostage. On the January 5, 2015, episode of Raw, Rollins was added to the Lesnar-Cena title match by Triple H as a reward for bringing back The Authority, turning the singles match into a triple threat. That same episode, the members of Team Cena from Survivor Series (Dolph Ziggler, Ryback, and Erick Rowan) were fired by The Authority for helping Cena to remove them from power. The following week, Lesnar returned for the contract signing with Cena and Rollins. A brawl broke out between all three men and ended when Rollins performed a Curb Stomp each on Cena and Lesnar. On the final Raw before the Royal Rumble, Triple H forced Cena to compete in a 3-on-1 Handicap match against Rollins, Big Show and Kane to not only secure his spot in the triple threat match, but also win Ziggler, Ryback and Rowan their jobs back. During the match, Sting, who previously assisted Team Cena at Survivor Series, caused a distraction which allowed Cena to roll-up Rollins for the win to keep his spot in the match and reinstate Ziggler, Ryback and Rowan. Lesnar then came down to the ring and attacked Rollins before executing an F-5 each on Kane and Big Show. Rollins then retreated to avoid further punishment.

On the December 29 episode of Raw, The Usos (Jey Uso and Jimmy Uso) defeated The Miz and Damien Mizdow to win the WWE Tag Team Championship. On the January 15 episode of SmackDown, it was announced that The Usos would defend the titles against Miz and Mizdow at the event.

On the January 5 episode of Raw, Paige came out and helped Natalya to defeat Nikki Bella. On the January 6 episode of Main Event, Natalya came out and helped Paige to defeat Nikki Bella. On the January 12 episode of Raw, Brie Bella defeated Paige due to distraction by Tyson Kidd. On the January 15 episode of SmackDown, Natalya defeated Nikki via submission. On the January 19 episode of Raw, after Paige and Natalya defeated Summer Rae and Alicia Fox, it was announced that The Bella Twins (Brie and Nikki) would face Paige and Natalya in a tag team match at the event.

On the January 5 episode of Raw, Cesaro and Tyson Kidd attacked Kofi Kingston and Xavier Woods, which let Adam Rose to defeat Big E. On the January 19 episode, Big E and Kofi defeated Cesaro and Kidd. Later in the night, it was announced that The New Day would face Cesaro, Kidd and Rose in a six-man tag team elimination match on the Royal Rumble Kickoff Show. On January 25, it was changed to a tag team match with Cesaro and Kidd (accompanied by Rose) vs. Big E and Kingston (accompanied by Woods) due to Woods being unable to compete.

On the December 29 episode of Raw, The Ascension (Konnor and Viktor) made their WWE debut. Over the next few weeks, the duo would easily defeat local preliminary wrestlers and compare themselves to famous tag teams, like The Road Warriors. On the January 19 episode of Raw, the Ascension were confronted and attacked by the New World Order(nWo), the APA and New Age Outlaws (Billy Gunn and Road Dogg) after the Ascension interfered in the nWo reunion segment. Later in the night, it was announced that the Ascension would face the New Age Outlaws at the event.

== Event ==
Other on-screen personnel
Role:	Name:
English commentators	Michael Cole
English commentators	Jerry Lawler
English commentators	John "Bradshaw" Layfield
Spanish commentators	Carlos Cabrera
Spanish commentators	Marcelo Rodriguez
Interviewer	Tom Phillips
Ring announcers	Lillian Garcia
Ring announcers	Eden Stiles
Referees	Mike Chioda
Referees	John Cone
Referees	Dan Engler
Referees	Rod Zapata
Referees	Darrick Moore
Referees	Chad Patton
Pre-show Panel	Renee Young
Pre-show Panel	Booker T
Pre-show Panel	Corey Graves
Pre-show Panel	Byron Saxton

=== Pre-show ===
During the Royal Rumble Kickoff pre-show, Cesaro and Tyson Kidd (accompanied by Adam Rose and Natalya) faced The New Day (Big E and Kofi Kingston, accompanied by Xavier Woods). Kingston and Big E were in control for most of the match until Cesaro executed a European uppercut on Kingston (from the outside) and Kidd executed a fisherman's neckbreaker on Kingston to secure a decisive victory.

=== Preliminary matches ===
The actual pay-per-view opened with The Ascension (Konnor and Viktor) facing The New Age Outlaws (Road Dogg and Billy Gunn). The Ascension had control for the majority of the match, however, Gunn came back with a tilt-a-whirl slam and positioned Viktor for the "Famouser". Viktor made a blind tag to Konnor and executed the "Fall of Man" on Gunn for the win.

Next was the WWE Tag Team Championship match between The Miz and Damien Mizdow and The Usos (Jey Uso and Jimmy Uso). During the match, The Miz refused to tag Mizdow into the match, but Mizdow made a few saves. Miz executed a "Skull Crushing Finale" on Jey for a near-fall. Mizdow did the same to Jey but earned a near-fall again. The Usos won the match with a "Samoan Splash" on Miz.

After that, The Bella Twins (Brie Bella and Divas Champion Nikki Bella) faced Paige and Natalya. Nikki executed a forearm smash on Natalya for the victory.

In the fourth match, Brock Lesnar (accompanied by Paul Heyman) defended the WWE World Heavyweight Championship against John Cena and Seth Rollins in a triple threat match. Lesnar dominated the match early with multiple Suplexes on both Cena and Rollins, at one point even executing a double German suplex on Rollins' associates J&J Security, briefly taking them out of the match. Lesnar then applied the Kimura Lock on Cena, but Rollins broke it up. Cena executed an Attitude Adjustment on Lesnar, but Rollins threw Cena out of the ring to steal a pin attempt, but Lesnar kicked out at one. Lesnar caught Rollins and executed an F-5 on him, but Cena broke up the pin. Cena executed three more Attitude Adjustments on Lesnar, but Rollins broke up the pin. Rollins then executed a Curb Stomp on Lesnar, but Cena broke up the pin. Cena tackled Lesnar through the barricade in the timekeeper's area, threw him to the steel steps, hit him with the same steel steps putting him on an announce table and Rollins finished the combo with a Diving Elbow Drop on him through it. Doctors came from backstage to check on and eventually attempt to stretcher out Lesnar. Cena eventually locked in the STF on Rollins, but J&J Security (Jamie Noble and Joey Mercury) interfered once more, resulting in Cena executing a Double Attitude Adjustment on Mercury and Noble, finally ending their involvement in the match. Cena then executed an Attitude Adjustment on Rollins and Rollins would execute a Curb Stomp on Cena in turn with both resulting in near-falls. Eventually, Rollins repositioned Cena and performed a Phoenix Splash on him, and was about to cover Cena. But; an angry Lesnar quickly recovered from the broken announcers table and rushed past the EMTs sent to check on him, returned to the ring, took down both men with German suplexes and one of those threw Cena out of the ring. Rollins tried to take advantage after landing on his feet after an attempted German from Lesnar failed; hit Lesnar twice with his Money in the Bank briefcase, and positioned the briefcase under Lesnar's head. As Rollins attempted a second Curb Stomp to Lesnar (with the briefcase still underneath his head), Lesnar countered with a second F-5 on Rollins to retain the title by pinfall.

=== Main event ===
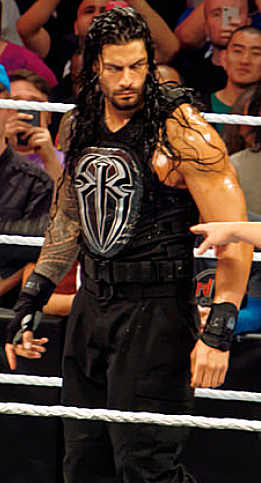
Roman Reigns won the 2015 Royal Rumble match.

The main event was the traditional 30-man Royal Rumble match, where the winner would receive a WWE World Heavyweight Championship match at WrestleMania 31. The Miz and R-Truth started the match at #1 and #2 respectively. Bubba Ray Dudley made his return to WWE at #3 eliminating Miz and Truth. Bray Wyatt at #5 would soon begin a string of eliminations one by one (including Bubba and The Boogeyman, who was another surprise entrant at #7). The string ended once Daniel Bryan entered at #10. During the string, Curtis Axel, who was supposed to enter at #6, was attacked by Erick Rowan and was unable to compete in the match.

Diamond Dallas Page was the third surprise entrant at #14 and executed the Diamond Cutter on various wrestlers, before being eliminated by #15 entrant Rusev. Like in 2014, the namesake match's reception flipped again to a turning point for worse as Wyatt eliminated fan-favorite Bryan, disappointing the audience potentially more than the previous year when he was absent. Towards the end of the match, Kane (entering at #24) and Big Show (entering at #29) from The Authority teamed up to go on a string of eliminations - including Wyatt and other popular stars like Ryback at #23, final entrant at #30 Dolph Ziggler, and Dean Ambrose at #25 (who had teamed up with Roman Reigns as The Shield went against the duo).

The final four consisted of Rusev (who was outside the ring at the time having gone under the bottom rope), Reigns, Kane, and Big Show. Reigns (who during the match suffered a cut from Big Show on one cheek, after being thrown to a padded turnbuckle and another one from Kane on the lips, after a Big Boot) sent out the duo at the same time. However, they both re-entered the ring and began a double team assault on Reigns. The Rock emerged and executed a Spinebuster-People's Elbow combo on Kane. Big Show attempted to Chokeslam Rock but Rock hit a low-blow in return, setting up a Rock Bottom after a Superman Punch from Reigns. Rusev re-entered the ring, but was speared by Reigns, who proceeded to throw him out to win the match. As WWE World Heavyweight Champion Brock Lesnar with Paul Heyman saw this on a television in their locker room, Triple H and Stephanie McMahon showed up at the end of the show unhappy with the result watching The Rock congratulate Reigns. Reigns was booed as the winner in a similar fashion as Batista the previous year, whereas at the same event Reigns was cheered.

== Reception ==
The very negative reaction of the fans attending the event in Philadelphia towards the Royal Rumble match and its winner was described as being even worse than the 2014 event. When Daniel Bryan was eliminated in the first half of the match, the crowd repeatedly chanted his name for the second half of the match while booing other wrestlers making their entrance to the match, including eventual winner Roman Reigns. The crowd grew even more unhappy when fan favorites Dolph Ziggler and Dean Ambrose were eliminated by Big Show and Kane, and chanted for the anti-American villain Rusev when the main event came down to Rusev and Reigns, as well as chants of "bullshit" and "CM Punk". Reigns was booed after winning the main event, even after he received The Rock's endorsement, and The Rock was heckled for helping Reigns. Many fans took to social media to display their displeasure at Bryan's elimination.

Dave Scherer of PWInsider wrote that the event "is definitely worth watching for the WWE World Heavyweight Championship triple threat match and how the Rumble went bad". He added that "bringing Bryan back for this match was a huge mistake, at least tonight", as "the fans wanted Bryan and they took him away", with the result that it "totally killed Roman in the eyes of those fans", resulting in a "really bad" ending.

James Caldwell of Pro Wrestling Torch rated the Royal Rumble main event as 3.5 stars out of 5, commenting that it was a "pretty good Rumble" until "the crowd turned on the match when they saw the writing on the wall for how it would end". Caldwell praised Bray Wyatt's involvement in the match and noted that Bubba Ray Dudley was a "good surprise return", but added that any good moments during the match were "overshadowed by the ending". Caldwell rated the WWE World Heavyweight Championship match as 4.0 out of 5 stars which was his highest rated match from the event, praising the "very strong story-telling" and describing the action as "top-notch" but adding that the match was "too dependent on the finisher kick-outs". He rated the Tag Team Championship match at 2.5 stars, describing it as a "solid tag match", while the Divas match and the opening bout between The Ascension and The New Age Outlaws were both rated at 1.5 stars out of 5.

Kenny Herzog of Rolling Stone questioned the possibility of the Royal Rumble match being the worst in history, arguing that several factors such as the poor treatment of former Intercontinental champions, Daniel Bryan's unexpected early elimination and Kane and Big Show's dominance over younger talent all detracted from the match. Herzog concluded, "That was less a Rumble match – i.e. the kind replete with feats of endurance and athleticism, free-for-all chaos and dozens of developing stories – than random gauntlet of triple-threat and four-way slugfests with no pacing or point. Unless, that is, you still think serving some idea of the Authority's omnipresence is really what's best for business." Despite this, Herzog praised the lively Philadelphia crowd, the return of Bubba Ray Dudley and Rollins' performance in the WWE World Heavyweight Championship match as positives.

Luke Winkie of Sports Illustrated was less critical of the Royal Rumble match, attributing Bryan's elimination to good storytelling and an instance where "you're supposed to hate the product". Winkie suggested that the "tepid reaction to [Reigns'] win has much more to do with Daniel Bryan’s early departure than it does with [Reigns'] actual reputation". Winkie singled out Ziggler's late entrance and elimination as "the most heartbreaking". He also praised the WWE World Heavyweight Championship match as being an early "Match of the Year" candidate, while questioning whether anyone cared about the Ascension.

WWE Hall of Famer Mick Foley, who had been critical of the previous year's show, wrote that he was saddened by the prospect of the Royal Rumble losing its luster and relevance as an annual event, and that he now considers it to be "a roadblock to the good will and excitement needed for a truly memorable WrestleMania atmosphere." Foley took aim at WWE for the supposedly unimaginative and unflattering use of fan favorites in the main Royal Rumble match, and, based on his observations of fans as they exited the arena, said "there was no joy in Philadelphia".

Observing the ensuing debates among wrestling enthusiasts, communications psychologist Carrrielynn Reinhard commented the online discourse highlighted fans' emotional attachment to wrestlers' fictional personas, similar to that of "shippers" in other fandoms.

In 2024, Roman Reigns spoke about his victory. He pointed that, after the bad reception by the public, he tries to forget about the Royal Rumble.

== Aftermath ==
Shortly after the event, #CancelWWENetwork became the top Twitter trend worldwide, while PWInsider reported that the WWE Network online cancellation page had crashed and that some subscribers who had called WWE to cancel their subscription were told to call back the next day as there were too many people attempting to manually cancel their subscription. The day after the Royal Rumble, Dave Meltzer reported on Wrestling Observer Radio that Vince McMahon and WWE had expected that Reigns's victory would receive some backlash, but not to the level they had experienced, and that despite this, WWE would not add Daniel Bryan to the main event at WrestleMania 31, since Vince felt that "it would be a repeat and gone to the well one time too often". Two days after the Royal Rumble event, WWE announced that the WWE Network surpassed 1 million subscribers worldwide, but the Pro Wrestling Torch newsletter reported that the recent "upset subscribers canceling" had yet to be factored into the subscriber count. Four days after the Royal Rumble, WWE announced a new promotion for the WWE Network where new subscribers could watch for free for the month of February. In February 2015, WWE held a poll on WWE.com asking if fans thought Bryan or Reigns was more deserving of headlining WrestleMania 31; following more than 33,000 votes, 86% of votes went to Bryan. Also in that month, WWE Chairman Vince McMahon responded to #CancelWWENetwork in a conference call, saying that the controversy was good for WWE. McMahon labelled it as a vocal minority upset that "the babyface did not win" and "Santa Claus didn't come on that PPV", but he expected those who complained to continue watching WWE anyway.

WWE had to postpone the post-Rumble Raw from Hartford, Connecticut due to the January 2015 nor'easter, marking the first time WWE had to cancel a scheduled Raw taping since the Chris Benoit double-murder and suicide and the first time Raw had to be moved to another city since 2009. WWE also canceled its scheduled SmackDown taping from Boston the following night. WWE decided to have Raw come from WWE headquarters in nearby Stamford, Connecticut instead, announcing it would hold a live SmackDown on Thursday from Hartford, honoring tickets that would be used for Raw, while allowing fans in Boston to either exchange their tickets for an upcoming house show on June 27 or obtaining a full refund. The post-Rumble Raw showed the WWE World Heavyweight Championship match and the main event of the Royal Rumble, albeit with commercial breaks. Seth Rollins, Brock Lesnar, Paul Heyman, Roman Reigns, and Daniel Bryan did in-studio interviews with several WWE announcers, such as Michael Cole, Renee Young and Byron Saxton, while Dean Ambrose "walked" to WWE headquarters from Hartford due to the statewide 9 PM travel ban.

Although Curtis Axel being unable to participate in the Rumble match was not unprecedented, the fact that Axel was not eliminated (having never officially entered the match) ended up trending on Twitter following the event, and also received supportive tweets from former WWE wrestlers Lance Storm and Tommy Dreamer, and then later from current WWE wrestlers Xavier Woods, Zack Ryder, and David Otunga, the latter offering his legal services. This led to an angle where he began referring to himself as "the true winner" of the Royal Rumble, claiming that he still had not been eliminated from the match and that he thus deserved a match with Lesnar at WrestleMania 31 for the WWE World Heavyweight Championship. This also led to Axel starting his own hashtag (#AxelMania). Instead of facing Brock Lesnar, Axel participated in the second annual André the Giant Memorial Battle Royal at WrestleMania 31, but was the first wrestler eliminated after the majority of the field threw him out of the ring.

== Results ==
No.	Results	Stipulations	Times
1^{P}	Tyson Kidd and Cesaro (with Adam Rose and Natalya) defeated The New Day (Big E and Kofi Kingston) (with Xavier Woods) by pinfall	Tag team match	11:02
2	The Ascension (Konnor and Viktor) defeated New Age Outlaws (Billy Gunn and Road Dogg) by pinfall	Tag team match	5:25
3	The Usos (Jey Uso and Jimmy Uso) (c) defeated Damien Mizdow and The Miz by pinfall	Tag team match for the WWE Tag Team Championship	9:20
4	The Bella Twins (Brie Bella and Nikki Bella) defeated Paige and Natalya by pinfall	Tag team match	8:05
5	Brock Lesnar (c) (with Paul Heyman) defeated Seth Rollins (with Jamie Noble and Joey Mercury) and John Cena by pinfall	Triple threat match for the WWE World Heavyweight Championship	22:42
6	Roman Reigns won by last eliminating Rusev	30-man Royal Rumble match for a WWE World Heavyweight Championship match at WrestleMania 31	59:31
(c) / – the champion(s) heading into the match; P / – the match was broadcast on the pre-show

=== Royal Rumble entrances and eliminations ===
A new entrant came out approximately every 90 seconds.

– Winner

Draw	Entrant	Order	Eliminated by	Time	Eliminations
1	The Miz	1	Bubba Ray Dudley	04:01	0
2	R-Truth	2	Bubba Ray Dudley	04:13	0
3	Bubba Ray Dudley	3	Bray Wyatt	05:22	2
4	Luke Harper	4	Bray Wyatt	03:42	0
5	Bray Wyatt	25	Big Show and Kane	47:29	7
6	Erick Rowan *	5	Bray Wyatt	00:50	0
7	The Boogeyman	6	Bray Wyatt	00:47	0
8	Sin Cara	7	Bray Wyatt	00:37	0
9	Zack Ryder	8	Bray Wyatt	00:34	0
10	Daniel Bryan	12	Bray Wyatt	10:36	1
11	Fandango	11	Rusev	07:50	0
12	Tyson Kidd	9	Daniel Bryan	02:29	0
13	Stardust	16	Roman Reigns	12:49	0
14	Diamond Dallas Page	10	Rusev	02:28	0
15	Rusev	29	Roman Reigns	35:40	6
16	Goldust	15	Roman Reigns	06:35	0
17	Kofi Kingston	14	Rusev	03:04	1
18	Adam Rose	13	Rusev and Kofi Kingston	01:01	0
19	Roman Reigns	-	Winner	27:29	6
20	Big E	19	Rusev	15:04	0
21	Damien Mizdow	17	Rusev	00:18	0
22	Jack Swagger	21	Big Show	13:06	0
23	Ryback	20	Big Show and Kane	11:15	0
24	Kane	27	Roman Reigns	17:13	4
25	Dean Ambrose	26	Big Show and Kane	10:40	1
26	Titus O'Neil	18	Dean Ambrose and Roman Reigns	00:04	0
27	Bad News Barrett	22	Dolph Ziggler	06:10	0
28	Cesaro	23	Dolph Ziggler	05:16	0
29	Big Show	28	Roman Reigns	08:39	5
30	Dolph Ziggler	24	Big Show and Kane	02:29	2

- ^{1} – Curtis Axel was the #6 entrant, but was attacked by Erick Rowan before entering the ring and was subsequently replaced by Rowan.
