= Royal Rumble =

World Wrestling Entertainment event series

- WWE Royal Rumble logo used since 2017
- Created by: Pat Patterson
- Promotion: WWE
- Brands: Raw (2003–2011, 2017–present); SmackDown (2003–2011, 2017–present); ECW (2007–2010); 205 Live (2019)
- First event: 1988
- Signature match: Royal Rumble match

Royal Rumble is a professional wrestling event, produced annually since 1988 by WWE, the world's largest professional wrestling promotion. It is named after, and centered on, the Royal Rumble match, a modified battle royal in which the participants enter at timed intervals instead of all beginning in the ring at the same time. After the inaugural 1988 event aired as a television special on the USA Network, the Royal Rumble has been broadcast via pay-per-view since the 1989 event and livestreaming since the 2015 event. The event is traditionally held in late January, but in 2025, it was held in early February, and it will again be held in early February in 2027. It is one of WWE's five biggest events of the year, along with WrestleMania, SummerSlam, Survivor Series, and Money in the Bank, referred to as the "Big Five".

The Royal Rumble match is generally held as the main event of the annual event. There are some exceptions, such as the 1988, 1996, 1997, 1998, 2006, 2013, and 2023 events. In 1988, the main event was a tag team match, while for all the others, it was a men's world championship match. While originally only for men, a women's version of the Royal Rumble match was held as the main event at the 2018 event, which was also the first event to have two Rumble matches on one card. It subsequently became standard to have both a men's and women's Royal Rumble match at the annual event. The 2025 event was the first to be held in a National Football League stadium, while the 2026 event was the first to take place outside of North America as it was held in Riyadh, Saudi Arabia, which was the first of WWE's "Big Five" held in the country.

== History ==
=== Event ===
The Royal Rumble match was created by wrestler and WWE Hall of Famer Pat Patterson and the event was established by the World Wrestling Federation (WWF, now WWE). After the match was first tested at a house show in October 1987, the first Royal Rumble event took place on January 24, 1988, and was broadcast live as a television special on the USA Network. The following year, the event started to be broadcast on pay-per-view (PPV), and thus became one of the "Big Four" annual PPVs, along with WrestleMania, Survivor Series, and SummerSlam, the promotion's then-four biggest shows of the year. From 1993 to 2002, it was considered one of the "Big Five", including King of the Ring, but that PPV event was discontinued after 2002 (although it returned to PPV in 2024). In August 2021, Money in the Bank became recognized as one of the "Big Five".

In May 2002, the WWF was renamed to World Wrestling Entertainment (WWE) following a lawsuit with the World Wildlife Fund over the "WWF" initialism. In April 2011, the promotion ceased using its full name with the "WWE" abbreviation becoming an orphaned initialism. Also in March 2002, the promotion introduced the brand extension, in which the roster was divided between the Raw and SmackDown brands where wrestlers were exclusively assigned to perform on their respective weekly television shows—ECW became a third brand in 2006. The first brand extension was dissolved in August 2011, but it was reintroduced in July 2016 (other brands, including NXT, NXT UK, and 205 Live, would also be active during this second brand split). The Royal Rumble, along with the other original "Big Four" events, were the only PPVs to never be held exclusively for one brand during either brand split periods. The 2008 Royal Rumble was the first WWE pay-per-view to be available in high-definition. In 2015, the Royal Rumble began to air on WWE's online streaming service, the WWE Network, which launched in February 2014, and in 2022, the event became available on Peacock as the American version of the WWE Network merged under Peacock in March 2021.

As a result of the COVID-19 pandemic that began affecting the industry in March 2020, WWE had to hold its events behind closed doors. The 2021 event was in turn held in WWE's bio-secure bubble called the WWE ThunderDome, which at the time was hosted at Tropicana Field in St. Petersburg, Florida. WWE resumed live touring in July 2021 and the 2022 event was held at The Dome at America's Center in St. Louis, Missouri.

From its inception in 1988 up through the 2024 event, the Royal Rumble was held annually in late January. On June 24, 2024, WWE announced a partnership with the Indiana Sports Corp which would see the 2025 Royal Rumble, as well as a future WrestleMania and a future SummerSlam, held at the Lucas Oil Stadium in Indianapolis, Indiana, marking the first Royal Rumble held in a National Football League stadium. The date for the 2025 Royal Rumble was announced for February 1, thus marking the first Royal Rumble held outside of January. This was also the first Royal Rumble, and WWE's first PPV and livestreaming event, to air on Netflix following the international WWE Network's merger under the platform in January 2025.

In early 2018, WWE began a 10-year strategic multiplatform partnership with the Ministry of Sport (formerly General Sports Authority) in support of Saudi Vision 2030, Saudi Arabia's social and economic reform program. The first event in this partnership was the one-off Greatest Royal Rumble, which featured a 50-man Royal Rumble match. In May 2024, the chairman of Saudi Arabia's General Entertainment Authority, Turki Alalshikh, announced that the country was in talks with WWE to bring either the Royal Rumble or WrestleMania to the country in 2026 or 2027. Ahead of Raw's premiere on Netflix on January 6, 2025, WWE officially confirmed that the 39th Royal Rumble would be happening in Riyadh, Saudi Arabia at the Kingdom Arena as part of Riyadh Season in January 2026, marking the first Royal Rumble to be held outside of North America, and the first of the "Big Five" held in Saudi Arabia. The 2026 event was also the first Royal Rumble to air on ESPN's direct-to-consumer streaming service in the United States, as WWE's contract with Peacock to air main roster PPV and livestreaming events expired at the conclusion of Clash in Paris in August 2025.

Due to the Royal Rumble matches taking up a large amount of time (most Rumble matches last roughly one hour), the Royal Rumble event tends to have a smaller card than most other pay-per-view events. The men's Royal Rumble match is usually the main event, though there have been exceptions, namely the 1988, 1996, 1997, 1998, 2006, 2013, 2018, and 2023 events. In these cases, 1988's main event was a tag team match, while the others were men's world championship matches, except in 2018. The 2018 Royal Rumble was the first to include a women's Royal Rumble match, which was the main event for that year. It was subsequently the first in which two Rumble matches were contested on one card and it is now standard for the event to include both a men's and women's Rumble match.

=== Match ===
The Royal Rumble match is based on the classic battle royal, in which a number of wrestlers (traditionally 30) aim at eliminating their competitors by tossing them over the top rope, with both feet touching the floor. The difference between a Royal Rumble and a standard battle royal is that in a standard battle royal, all participants start the match in the ring at the same time, where in a Royal Rumble match, two participants start and then the rest enter at timed intervals. The winner of the match is the last wrestler remaining after all others have been eliminated. Since the 1993 event, the prize for winning is a world championship match at WrestleMania, with the exception of the 2016 event, where the prize was the WWE Championship (at the time known as the WWE World Heavyweight Championship) as reigning champion Roman Reigns defended the title in the match. According to Hornswoggle, who worked for WWE from 2006 until 2016 and participated in two Rumbles, participants may learn their eliminations by knowing the two wrestlers who are eliminated before them and which wrestlers are entering the Royal Rumble before and after their elimination.

== Events and winners ==
#	Event	Date	City	Venue	Main event	Royal Rumble Winner				Ref.
#	Event	Date	City	Venue	Main event	Men's	No.	Women's	No.	Ref.
1	Royal Rumble (1988)	January 24, 1988	Hamilton, Ontario, Canada	Copps Coliseum	The Islanders (Haku and Tama) vs. The Young Stallions (Paul Roma and Jim Powers) in a two out of three falls match	Jim Duggan	13	—N/a		
2	Royal Rumble (1989)	January 15, 1989	Houston, Texas	The Summit	30-man Royal Rumble match	Big John Studd	27	—N/a		
3	Royal Rumble (1990)	January 21, 1990	Orlando, Florida	Orlando Arena	30-man Royal Rumble match	Hulk Hogan	25	—N/a		
4	Royal Rumble (1991)	January 19, 1991	Miami, Florida	Miami Arena	30-man Royal Rumble match	Hulk Hogan (2)	24	—N/a		
5	Royal Rumble (1992)	January 19, 1992	Albany, New York	Knickerbocker Arena	30-man Royal Rumble match for the vacant WWF World Heavyweight Championship	Ric Flair	3	—N/a		
6	Royal Rumble (1993)	January 24, 1993	Sacramento, California	ARCO Arena	30-man Royal Rumble match for a WWF World Heavyweight Championship match at WrestleMania IX	Yokozuna	27	—N/a		
7	Royal Rumble (1994)	January 22, 1994	Providence, Rhode Island	Providence Civic Center	30-man Royal Rumble match for a WWF World Heavyweight Championship match at WrestleMania X	Lex Luger	23	—N/a		
7	Royal Rumble (1994)	January 22, 1994	Providence, Rhode Island	Providence Civic Center	30-man Royal Rumble match for a WWF World Heavyweight Championship match at WrestleMania X	Bret Hart	27	—N/a		
8	Royal Rumble (1995)	January 22, 1995	Tampa, Florida	USF Sun Dome	30-man Royal Rumble match for a WWF World Heavyweight Championship match at WrestleMania XI	Shawn Michaels	1	—N/a		
9	Royal Rumble (1996)	January 21, 1996	Fresno, California	Selland Arena	Bret Hart (c) vs. The Undertaker for the WWF World Heavyweight Championship	Shawn Michaels (2)	18	—N/a		
10	Royal Rumble (1997)	January 19, 1997	San Antonio, Texas	Alamodome	Sycho Sid (c) vs. Shawn Michaels for the WWF Championship	"Stone Cold" Steve Austin	5	—N/a		
11	Royal Rumble (1998)	January 18, 1998	San Jose, California	San Jose Arena	Shawn Michaels (c) vs. The Undertaker in a Casket match for the WWF Championship	"Stone Cold" Steve Austin (2)	24	—N/a		
12	Royal Rumble (1999)	January 24, 1999	Anaheim, California	Arrowhead Pond of Anaheim	30-man Royal Rumble match for a WWF Championship match at WrestleMania XV	Mr. McMahon	2	—N/a		
13	Royal Rumble (2000)	January 23, 2000	New York City, New York	Madison Square Garden	30-man Royal Rumble match for a WWF Championship match at WrestleMania 2000	The Rock	24	—N/a		
14	Royal Rumble (2001)	January 21, 2001	New Orleans, Louisiana	New Orleans Arena	30-man Royal Rumble match for a WWF Championship match at WrestleMania X-Seven	"Stone Cold" Steve Austin (3)	27	—N/a		
15	Royal Rumble (2002)	January 20, 2002	Atlanta, Georgia	Philips Arena	30-man Royal Rumble match for an Undisputed WWF Championship match at WrestleMania X8	Triple H	22	—N/a		
16	Royal Rumble (2003)	January 19, 2003	Boston, Massachusetts	FleetCenter	30-man Royal Rumble match for a world championship match at WrestleMania XIX	Brock Lesnar	29	—N/a		
17	Royal Rumble (2004)	January 25, 2004	Philadelphia, Pennsylvania	Wachovia Center	30-man Royal Rumble match for a world championship match at WrestleMania XX	Chris Benoit	1	—N/a		
18	Royal Rumble (2005)	January 30, 2005	Fresno, California	Save Mart Center	30-man Royal Rumble match for a world championship match at WrestleMania 21	Batista	28	—N/a		
19	Royal Rumble (2006)	January 29, 2006	Miami, Florida	American Airlines Arena	Kurt Angle (c) vs. Mark Henry for the World Heavyweight Championship	Rey Mysterio	2	—N/a		
20	Royal Rumble (2007)	January 28, 2007	San Antonio, Texas	AT&T Center	30-man Royal Rumble match for a world championship match at WrestleMania 23	The Undertaker	30	—N/a		
21	Royal Rumble (2008)	January 27, 2008	New York City, New York	Madison Square Garden	30-man Royal Rumble match for a world championship match at WrestleMania XXIV	John Cena	30	—N/a		
22	Royal Rumble (2009)	January 25, 2009	Detroit, Michigan	Joe Louis Arena	30-man Royal Rumble match for a world championship match at WrestleMania XXV	Randy Orton	8	—N/a		
23	Royal Rumble (2010)	January 31, 2010	Atlanta, Georgia	Philips Arena	30-man Royal Rumble match for a world championship match at WrestleMania XXVI	Edge	29	—N/a		
24	Royal Rumble (2011)	January 30, 2011	Boston, Massachusetts	TD Garden	40-man Royal Rumble match for a world championship match at WrestleMania XXVII	Alberto Del Rio	38	—N/a		
25	Royal Rumble (2012)	January 29, 2012	St. Louis, Missouri	Scottrade Center	30-man Royal Rumble match for a world championship match at WrestleMania XXVIII	Sheamus	22	—N/a		
26	Royal Rumble (2013)	January 27, 2013	Phoenix, Arizona	US Airways Center	CM Punk (c) vs. The Rock for the WWE Championship	John Cena (2)	19	—N/a		
27	Royal Rumble (2014)	January 26, 2014	Pittsburgh, Pennsylvania	Consol Energy Center	30-man Royal Rumble match for a WWE World Heavyweight Championship match at WrestleMania XXX	Batista (2)	28	—N/a		
28	Royal Rumble (2015)	January 25, 2015	Philadelphia, Pennsylvania	Wells Fargo Center	30-man Royal Rumble match for a WWE World Heavyweight Championship match at WrestleMania 31	Roman Reigns	19	—N/a		
29	Royal Rumble (2016)	January 24, 2016	Orlando, Florida	Amway Center	Roman Reigns (c) vs. 29 other wrestlers in a 30-man Royal Rumble match for the WWE World Heavyweight Championship	Triple H (2)	30	—N/a		
30	Royal Rumble (2017)	January 29, 2017	San Antonio, Texas	Alamodome	30-man Royal Rumble match for a world championship match at WrestleMania 33	Randy Orton (2)	23	—N/a		
31	Royal Rumble (2018)	January 28, 2018	Philadelphia, Pennsylvania	Wells Fargo Center	30-woman Royal Rumble match for a women's world championship match at WrestleMania 34	Shinsuke Nakamura	14	Asuka	25	
32	Royal Rumble (2019)	January 27, 2019	Phoenix, Arizona	Chase Field	30-man Royal Rumble match for a world championship match at WrestleMania 35	Seth Rollins	10	Becky Lynch	28	
33	Royal Rumble (2020)	January 26, 2020	Houston, Texas	Minute Maid Park	30-man Royal Rumble match for a world championship match at WrestleMania 36	Drew McIntyre	16	Charlotte Flair	17	
34	Royal Rumble (2021)	January 31, 2021	St. Petersburg, Florida	WWE ThunderDome at Tropicana Field	30-man Royal Rumble match for a world championship match at WrestleMania 37	Edge (2)	1	Bianca Belair	3	
35	Royal Rumble (2022)	January 29, 2022	St. Louis, Missouri	The Dome at America's Center	30-man Royal Rumble match for a world championship match at WrestleMania 38	Brock Lesnar (2)	30	Ronda Rousey	28	
36	Royal Rumble (2023)	January 28, 2023	San Antonio, Texas	Alamodome	Roman Reigns (c) vs. Kevin Owens for the Undisputed WWE Universal Championship	Cody Rhodes	30	Rhea Ripley	1	
37	Royal Rumble (2024)	January 27, 2024	St. Petersburg, Florida	Tropicana Field	30-man Royal Rumble match for a world championship match at WrestleMania XL	Cody Rhodes (2)	15	Bayley	3	
38	Royal Rumble (2025)	February 1, 2025	Indianapolis, Indiana	Lucas Oil Stadium	30-man Royal Rumble match for a world championship match at WrestleMania 41	Jey Uso	20	Charlotte Flair (2)	27	
39	Royal Rumble (2026)	January 31, 2026	Riyadh, Saudi Arabia	Riyadh Season Stadium at King Abdullah Financial District	30-man Royal Rumble match for a world championship match at WrestleMania 42	Roman Reigns (2)	26	Liv Morgan	14	
40	Royal Rumble (2027)	February 6, 2027	Glendale, Arizona	State Farm Stadium						
(c) – refers to the champion(s) heading into the match

== Video box set ==
In March 2007, WWE released a complete DVD box set titled Royal Rumble: The Complete Anthology, which showcases every Royal Rumble event in its entirety, up to the 2007 Royal Rumble.
