= Royal Rumble (2013) =

WWE pay-per-view event

- Promotional poster featuring The Rock
- Promotion: WWE
- Date: January 27, 2013
- City: Phoenix, Arizona
- Venue: US Airways Center
- Attendance: 15,103
- Buy rate: 579,000
- Tagline: Finally...

Pay-per-view chronology
← Previous; TLC: Tables, Ladders & Chairs	Next → Elimination Chamber

Royal Rumble chronology
← Previous; 2012	Next → 2014

The 2013 Royal Rumble was a professional wrestling pay-per-view (PPV) event produced by WWE. It was the 26th annual Royal Rumble event and took place on January 27, 2013, at the US Airways Center in Phoenix, Arizona. The event was based around the men's Royal Rumble match, a modified 30-man battle royal in which the participants enter at timed intervals instead of all beginning in the ring at the same time and the winner received a world championship match at WrestleMania. For the 2013 event, the winner received their choice to challenge for either the WWE Championship or World Heavyweight Championship at WrestleMania 29.

Five matches were contested at the event, including one on the Pre-Show. In the main event, The Rock defeated CM Punk to win the WWE Championship, ending Punk's reign at 434 days; this was also Rock's first championship since 2002. On the undercard, John Cena won the 2013 Royal Rumble match, marking his second win, after 2008, and making him the fourth multi-time winner, after Hulk Hogan, Shawn Michaels, and "Stone Cold" Steve Austin. In another prominent match, Antonio Cesaro defeated The Miz to retain his WWE United States Championship.

This was the last Royal Rumble event to feature this version of the World Heavyweight Championship as it was unified with the WWE Championship in December at TLC: Tables, Ladders & Chairs. As a result of the unification, the World Heavyweight Championship was immediately retired while the WWE Championship became known as the WWE World Heavyweight Championship. This subsequently made it the last Royal Rumble event to include two eligible options for the Royal Rumble match winner until the 2017 event.

== Production ==
=== Background ===
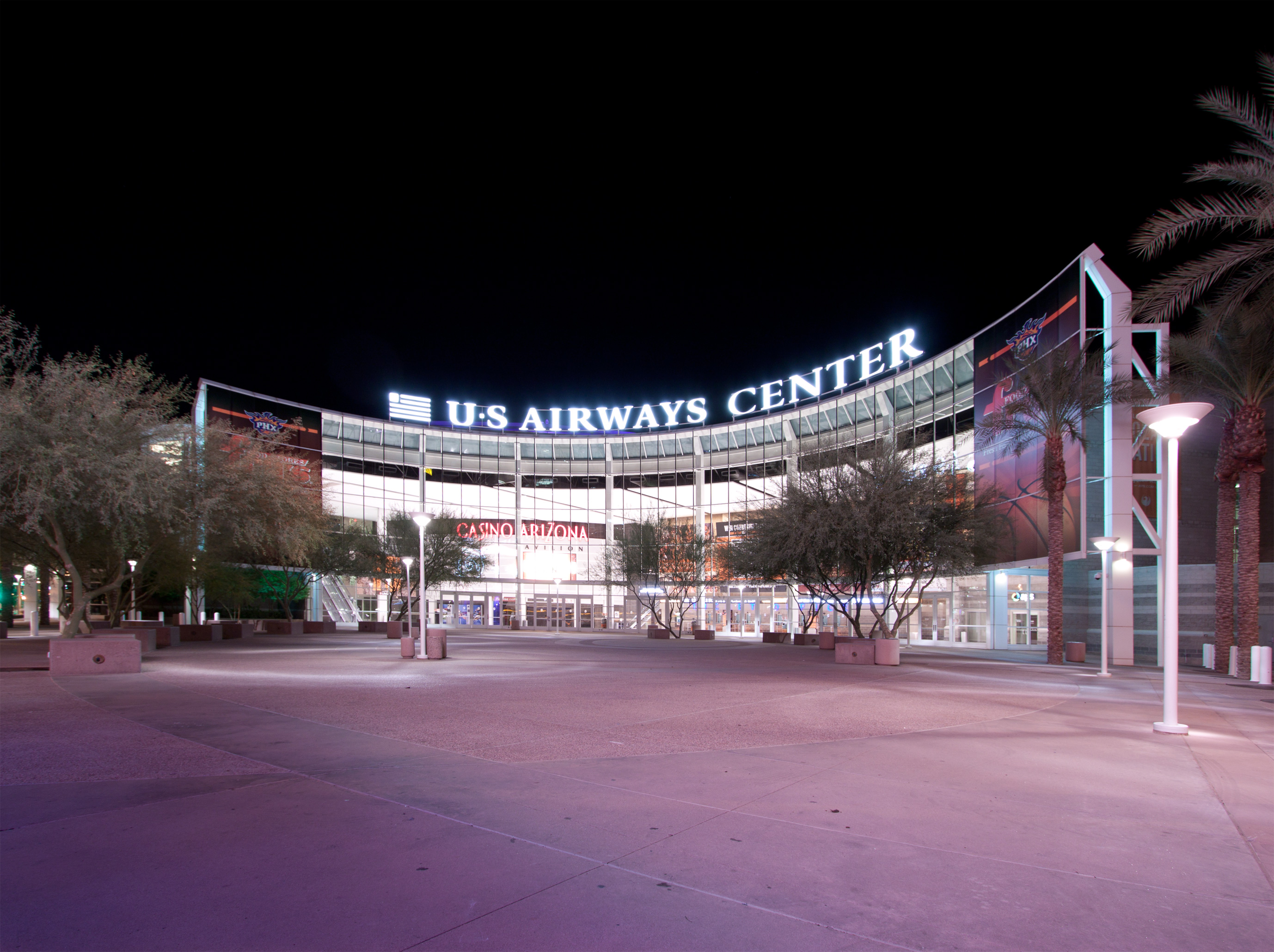
The 26th annual Royal Rumble event was held at the US Airways Center in Phoenix, Arizona.

The Royal Rumble is an annual professional wrestling event, produced every January by WWE since 1988; that first event was a television special before it became a pay-per-view (PPV) event beginning in 1989. It is one of the promotion's original four pay-per-views, along with WrestleMania, SummerSlam, and Survivor Series, referred to as the "Big Four". It is named after and centered on the men's Royal Rumble match. The 26th Royal Rumble event was scheduled to be held on January 27, 2013, at the US Airways Center in Phoenix, Arizona.

The Royal Rumble match is a modified battle royal in which the participants enter at timed intervals instead of all beginning in the ring at the same time, and the match generally features 30 wrestlers. Since 1993, the winner earns a world championship match at that year's WrestleMania. For 2013, the winner could choose to challenge for either the WWE Championship or World Heavyweight Championship at WrestleMania 29.

=== Storylines ===
The event comprised five matches, including one on the Pre-Show, that resulted from scripted storylines. Results were predetermined by WWE's writers, while storylines were produced on WWE's weekly television shows, Raw and SmackDown.

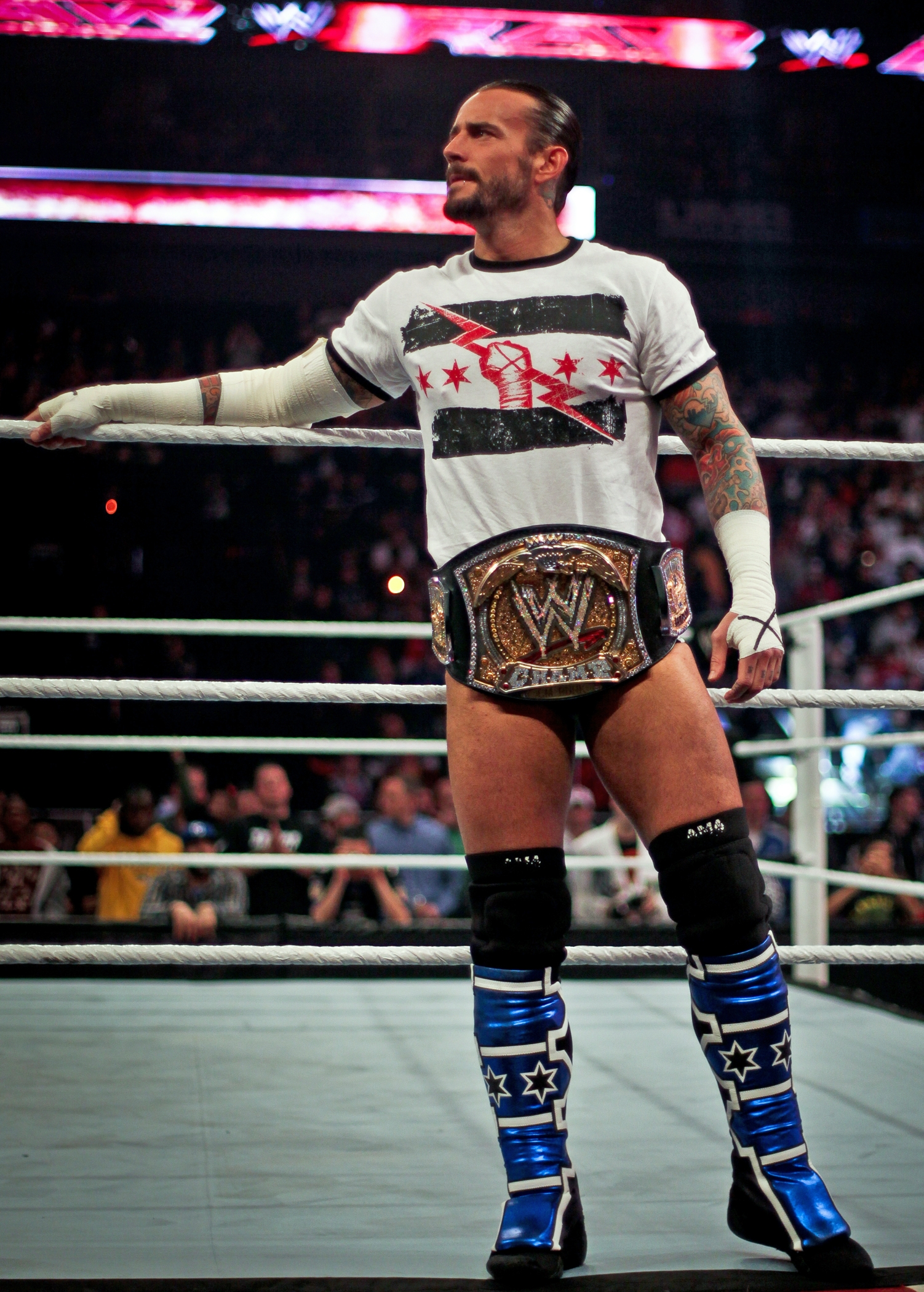
CM Punk lost the WWE Championship to The Rock, ending his reign at 434 days.

On July 23, 2012, during Raw 1000, The Rock announced that he would challenge for the WWE Championship at the Royal Rumble. Later that night, reigning champion CM Punk, Daniel Bryan, and John Cena each stated that they'd face The Rock as defending champion; later that night, Punk turned heel, attacking and laying out The Rock. Punk defended the championship for the rest of the year, while on December 23, 2012, The Rock tweeted to Punk that he was ready for the Royal Rumble. On the January 7 episode of Raw, Punk retained the WWE Championship against Ryback in a Tables, Ladders, and Chairs match after The Shield interfered. They also did during Punk's defense against Ryback and John Cena back at Survivor Series; this win secured Punk as the one who would defend against The Rock. On the January 21 episode of Raw while speaking about beating Punk at the Royal Rumble, The Shield assaulted The Rock. After the assault, WWE Chairman Vince McMahon announced that if The Shield interfered in the match, Punk will be stripped of his title.

Big Show began a feud with Alberto Del Rio after humiliating Del Rio's personal ring announcer, Ricardo Rodriguez, sarcastically picking him to fight Big Show for the World Heavyweight Championship during "Champion's Choice Night" on the New Year's Eve 2013 episode of Raw, leading to a disqualification win for Big Show after Del Rio interfered. On the January 11, 2013, episode of SmackDown, Del Rio defeated Big Show in a Last Man Standing match for the championship. Three days later on Raw, Big Show announced that he would invoke his rematch clause at the pay-per-view. The week after, he made the match a Last Man Standing Match.

== Event ==
Other on-screen personnel
Role:	Name:
English commentators	Michael Cole
English commentators	Jerry Lawler
English commentators	John Bradshaw Layfield
Pre-show commentators	Tony Dawson
Pre-show commentators	Matt Striker
Spanish commentators	Carlos Cabrera
Spanish commentators	Marcelo Rodríguez
Interviewer	Matt Striker
Ring announcers	Lilian Garcia
Ring announcers	Justin Roberts
Referees	Charles Robinson
Referees	Mike Chioda
Referees	Scott Armstrong
Referees	Rod Zapata
Referees	Darrick Moore (Pre-show)

=== Pre-show ===
The Royal Rumble Pre-Show match featured reigning United States Champion Antonio Cesaro defending his title against The Miz. During the match, Miz attempted a diving attack and injured his leg. Shortly after, Cesaro won after landing the Neutralizer.

=== Preliminary matches ===
As the PPV portion of the show began, a backstage segment was shown with Bret Hart wishing Alberto Del Rio good luck in his match. He then gave Ricardo Rodriguez a pair of his signature sunglasses.

The opening match on the PPV telecast (and second on the card overall) featured reigning World Heavyweight Champion Alberto Del Rio defending his title against Big Show in a Last Man Standing match. After Del Rio managed to beat the count after being chokeslammed through a table from an elevated position on the entrance stage, he managed to win when he locked in the Cross Armbreaker while Rodriguez duct taped Show's legs to the bottom rope. Show was unable to free himself in time and was counted out.

Next, reigning WWE Tag Team Champions Team Hell No (Daniel Bryan and Kane) defended their titles against Team Rhodes Scholars (Cody Rhodes and Damien Sandow). The match ended when Bryan applied the No! Lock on Sandow, forcing him to submit.

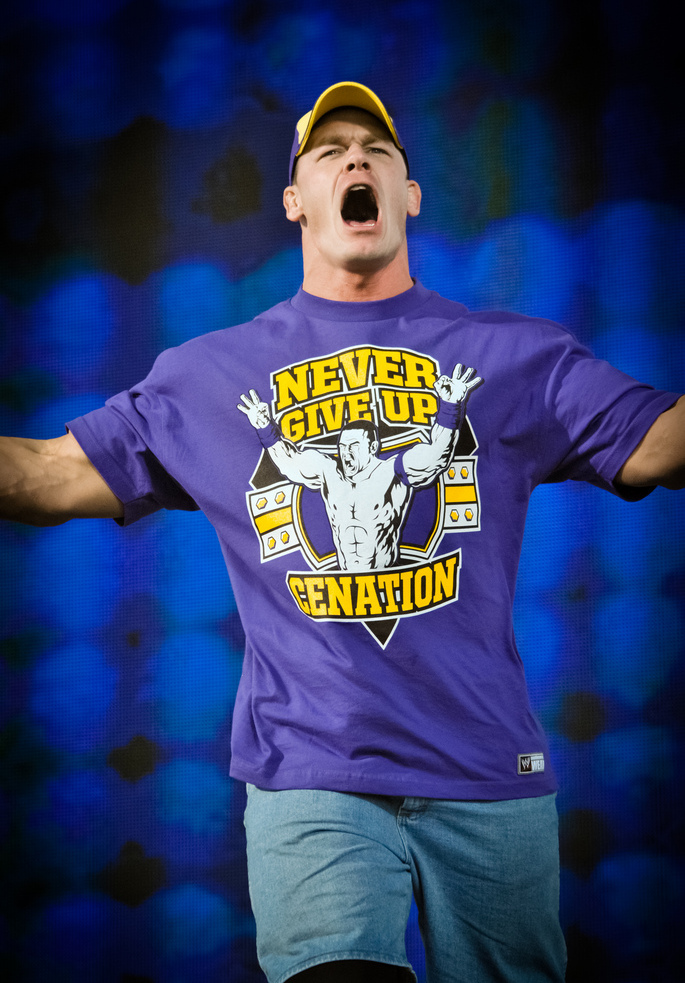
John Cena won the 2013 Royal Rumble match, which was his second win, after 2008, becoming the fourth multi-time winner, after Hulk Hogan, Shawn Michaels, and "Stone Cold" Steve Austin.

After that was the annual Royal Rumble match making it the first time in 7 years (since back in 2006) that the Royal Rumble Match would not be the main event of the namesake PPV. Dolph Ziggler (as per the "Beat The Clock" stipulations from Raw) chose to enter first, followed by the surprise return of Chris Jericho at #2. Another surprise entry, Goldust returned at #8, and spent most of his time battling with his half brother Cody Rhodes (entrant #3), who eventually eliminated him. Sheamus entered at #11, trying to become the fourth man to win back-to-back Rumbles, joining Hulk Hogan ('90-'91), Shawn Michaels ('95-'96), and "Stone Cold" Steve Austin ('97-'98). Kofi Kingston (the #4 entrant) provided a highlight, for when he was about to be eliminated, he jumped onto the back of recently eliminated Tensai, who put him on the Spanish announce table. Kingston made it back onto the apron using John Bradshaw Layfield's chair like a pogo stick, but was quickly eliminated by Rhodes before reentering the ring. Following this, The Godfather made a surprise appearance at #17, only to be immediately eliminated by Ziggler. John Cena entered at #19, quickly eliminating Rhodes and #10 entrant Heath Slater. Daniel Bryan (#21) and Kane (#24) teamed up to eliminate #23 The Great Khali, but Bryan then eliminated Kane. When #22 Antonio Cesaro sent Bryan over the top rope, Kane caught him, only to drop him on the floor, eliminating him from the match. Later, NXT tournament winner (and #16 entrant) Bo Dallas managed to eliminate Intercontinental Champion Wade Barrett (#18), leading to Barrett eliminating him and perform the Bull Hammer on Dallas, despite having already been eliminated. Ryback entered at #30 and eliminated three wrestlers in quick fashion. Ziggler finally eliminated Jericho after nearly 48 minutes. The final four consisted of Ziggler, Sheamus, Cena and Ryback. Sheamus eliminated Ziggler (who lasted nearly 50 minutes) and tried to execute the Broque Kick on Ryback, but Ryback managed to eliminate him. After a few minutes of going back and forth, Cena then eliminated Ryback to win the Rumble, making him the fourth wrestler to win multiple Royal Rumble matches (as he won the match in 2008 as well).

=== Main event match ===
The main event and fifth match on the card featured reigning WWE Champion CM Punk defending his title against The Rock. During the match, The Rock attempted to perform a Rock Bottom through the Spanish announce table on Punk, but the table collapsed beneath them. The Rock performed a Rock Bottom outside the ring, but Punk kicked out of a pin attempt. When The Rock attempted to perform a People's Elbow, the arena went dark and The Rock was attacked by an unknown entity, believed by the commentators to be The Shield (Dean Ambrose, Roman Reigns and Seth Rollins). When the lights came back on, the assailant(s) were nowhere to be found, and The Rock had been driven through the English announce table, allowing Punk to get the winning pin. As Punk celebrated with the title, WWE Chairman Vince McMahon came out and reminded Punk that if The Shield interfered (which while McMahon said he could not see it, he knew enough to realize what had happened), he would strip him of the title. Before he could do so, The Rock said he wanted to take the title from Punk and told McMahon to instead restart the match. McMahon did so, and The Rock won the match with a Spinebuster followed by a second People's Elbow, winning the WWE Championship for the eighth time and ending Punk's historic reign at 434 days.

== Reception ==
The event garnered 512,000 pay-per-view buys, the highest in four years.

== Aftermath ==
CM Punk, livid that his reign had ended, invoked his rematch clause at Elimination Chamber, but The Rock defeated him and retained the championship. Punk then challenged Cena for his contendership opportunity, which Cena accepted and defeated Punk. Punk later went to WrestleMania to try to end The Undertaker's undefeated streak. After Elimination Chamber, The Rock retired the spinner and bling belt (which was Cena's design for the championship and used by the company for the past eight years) and unveiled a new belt to represent the WWE Championship.

The following night on Raw, John Cena announced that he would challenge the reigning WWE Champion with his winning the Royal Rumble match. With The Rock retaining the championship, this would set up a rematch between The Rock and Cena from last year's WrestleMania. Cena would go on to win the match and the championship, making him a record 11-time WWE Champion.

The 2013 Royal Rumble was the last to feature this version of the World Heavyweight Championship, as well as the last time it was a choice for the winner of the titular match, as the title was unified with the WWE Championship at December's TLC: Tables, Ladders & Chairs event. The World Heavyweight Championship was immediately retired while the WWE Championship was renamed as WWE World Heavyweight Championship. It would in turn be the last Royal Rumble in which two world championships were eligible to be challenged for by the Royal Rumble winner until the 2017 event.

== Results ==
No.	Results	Stipulations	Times
1^{P}	Antonio Cesaro (c) defeated The Miz by pinfall	Singles match for the WWE United States Championship	7:37
2	Alberto Del Rio (c) (with Ricardo Rodriguez) defeated Big Show	Last Man Standing match for the World Heavyweight Championship	16:57
3	Team Hell No (Daniel Bryan and Kane) (c) defeated Team Rhodes Scholars (Cody Rhodes and Damien Sandow) by submission	Tag team match for the WWE Tag Team Championship	9:25
4	John Cena won by last eliminating Ryback	30-man Royal Rumble match for a world championship match at WrestleMania 29	55:05
5	The Rock defeated CM Punk (c) (with Paul Heyman) by pinfall (Note: Originally, CM Punk defeated The Rock, but the match was restarted after The Shield interfered.)	Singles match for the WWE Championship; Had The Shield interfered, Punk would have been stripped of the title.	23:20
(c) / – the champion(s) heading into the match; P / – the match was broadcast on the pre-show

=== Royal Rumble entrances and eliminations ===
– NXT
– Winner

Draw	Entrant	Order	Eliminated by	Time	Eliminations
1	Dolph Ziggler	27	Sheamus	49:47	2
2	Chris Jericho	25	Dolph Ziggler	47:53	2
3	Cody Rhodes	12	John Cena	27:39	4
4	Kofi Kingston	9	Cody Rhodes	21:18	2
5	Santino Marella	1	Cody Rhodes	00:55	0
6	Drew McIntyre	2	Chris Jericho	02:40	0
7	Titus O'Neil	3	Sheamus	07:30	0
8	Goldust	5	Cody Rhodes	09:41	0
9	David Otunga	4	Sheamus	04:24	0
10	Heath Slater	11	John Cena	15:49	1
11	Sheamus	28	Ryback	37:23	5
12	Tensai	7	Kofi Kingston	05:37	0
13	Brodus Clay	6	Chris Jericho, Cody Rhodes, Darren Young, Heath Slater & Sheamus	03:47	0
14	Rey Mysterio	13	Wade Barrett	10:33	0
15	Darren Young	8	Kofi Kingston	02:51	1
16	Bo Dallas	21	Sin Cara & Wade Barrett^{1}	21:42	1
17	The Godfather	10	Dolph Ziggler	00:05	0
18	Wade Barrett	20	Bo Dallas	20:34	2
19	John Cena	-	Winner	26:39	4
20	Damien Sandow	22	Ryback	16:26	0
21	Daniel Bryan	16	Antonio Cesaro & Kane^{2}	07:55	2
22	Antonio Cesaro	18	John Cena	08:50	1
23	The Great Khali	14	Daniel Bryan & Kane	03:08	0
24	Kane	15	Daniel Bryan	01:46	2
25	Zack Ryder	17	Randy Orton	02:34	0
26	Randy Orton	26	Ryback	10:20	1
27	Jinder Mahal	19	Sheamus	02:10	0
28	The Miz	24	Ryback	05:08	0
29	Sin Cara	23	Ryback	03:27	1
30	Ryback	29	John Cena	09:06	5

- ^{1} – Barrett was already eliminated, but after that, Sin Cara pushed Bo Dallas over the top rope. As a result, both Cara and Barrett were able to eliminate Dallas.
- ^{2} – Cesaro threw Bryan over the top rope, who was then caught on the outside by Kane (who had already been eliminated). Kane then dropped Bryan to the floor, eliminating him.

=== Royal Rumble Entry Tournament ===
The Royal Rumble Entry Tournament was a tournament on the NXT brand where the winner entered the 2013 Royal Rumble Match.

1st Round; Royal Rumble Fan Fest; January 26, 2013
Leo Kruger	Pinfall
Xavier Woods	—
Adrian Neville	Pinfall
Corey Graves	—
Oliver Grey	—
Conor O'Brian	Pinfall
Luke Harper	—
Bo Dallas	Pinfall

Semifinals; Royal Rumble Fan Fest; January 26, 2013
Leo Kruger	Pinfall
Adrian Neville	—
Conor O'Brian	—
Bo Dallas	Pinfall

Final; Royal Rumble Fan Fest; January 26, 2013
Leo Kruger	—
Bo Dallas	Pinfall

== Backstage incident ==
In April 2013, WWE producer Andrew Green filled a lawsuit against professional wrestler Big Show and WWE over alleged injuries and emotional distress he suffered during an interview with Show after his loss against Alberto Del Rio. Green claimed in his lawsuit that Show refused to do the interview until he told him that WWE senior vice president Eric Pankowski wanted the wrestler to do it. During the interview, Show physically attacked him after he got up and laced into a "profanely indecent language" towards him when Wight "grabbed him by the collar and throat, striking Green in the face and backing him up against a trunk while declaring in part, 'Are you having fun right now … Don’t ever come up to me again.'” Green also stated he was unable to work after the incident and said that he was "uncomfortable working around Big Show and the other wrestlers, nervous, and had ‘a ton of anxiety’ as a result of the attack." Both Green and his wife also sought damages for negligence, invasion of privacy, commercial appropriation of his likeness, unjust enrichment, as well as negligent hiring and retention and supervision.
