= Reality Era =

Period of professional wrestling within WWE, 2014–2016

- The logo used by WWE throughout most of the Reality Era that is also the current logo as of September 2025
- Promotion: WWE
- Date: disputed – May 1, 2016

WWF/WWE eras chronology
| ← Previous; PG Era | Next → New Era |

The Reality Era is an era of professional wrestling within World Wrestling Entertainment (WWE), which began approximately early 2014 through May 1, 2016. It succeeded the previous PG Era.

== Daniel Bryan's storyline and initiation ==
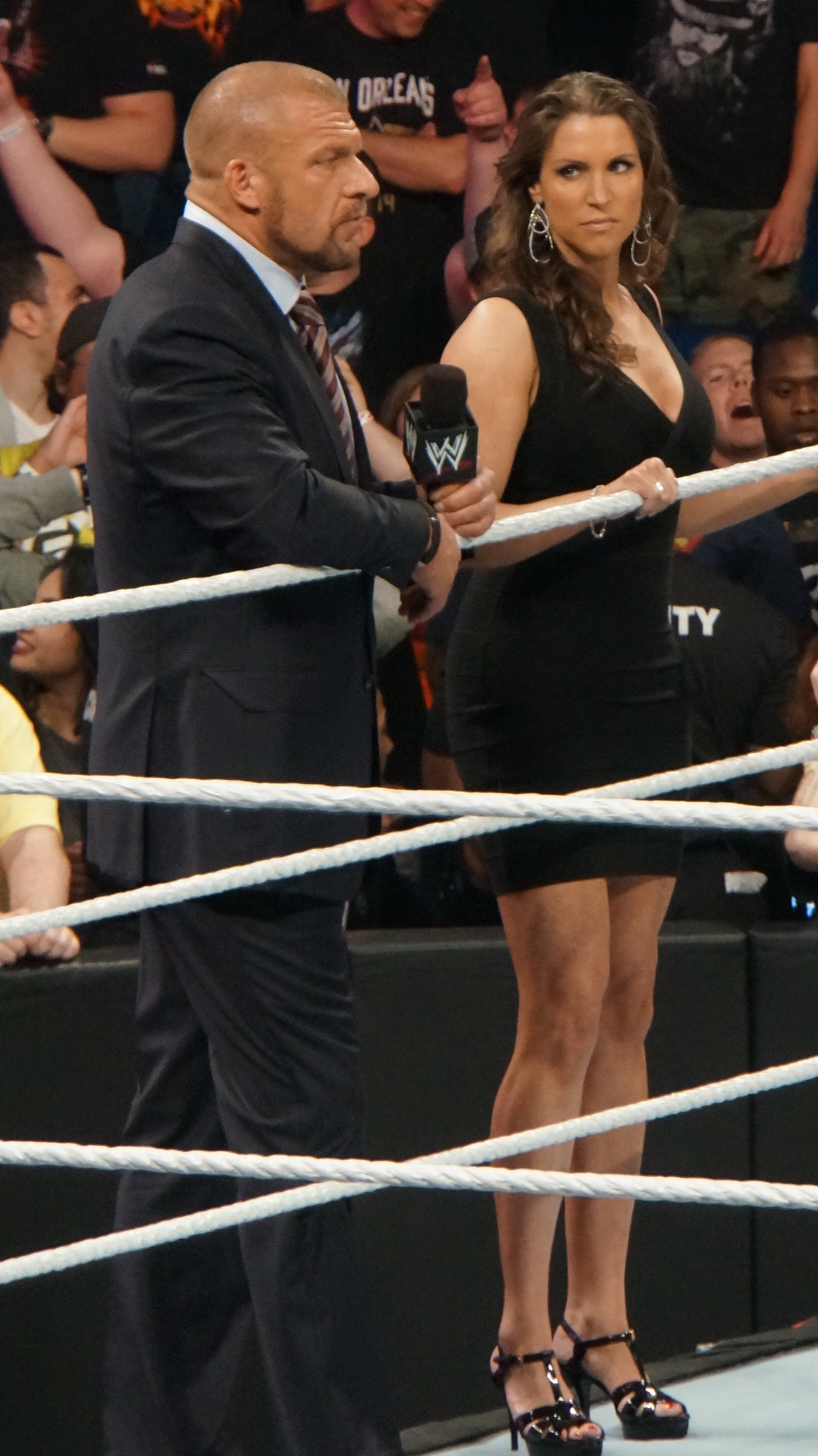
Triple H and Stephanie McMahon (The Authority) had a heavy presence on television during the Reality Era.

On April 8, 2013, post-WrestleMania 29 episode of Raw, fans expressed intense and vocal displeasure when then-SmackDown General Manager Booker T suggested the possibility of a third match between John Cena and The Rock. John Cena's increased prominence in major storylines had also been criticized by various media outlets. Conversely, fan support for Daniel Bryan began to rise as the year rolled on, as he was compared to Stone Cold Steve Austin during the Attitude Era. Similar to the "What?" chants associated with Austin, the "Yes!" chants among the fans of Bryan have become a cultural trend in the WWE — the chant even going as far as being translated to "Oui! Oui! Oui" whenever WWE would hold televised events in Montreal in 2018 and 2019.

After John Cena lost the WWE Championship to Daniel Bryan at SummerSlam, the storyline featuring The Authority began. During the "Championship Ascension Ceremony" segment ahead of Cena and Randy Orton's approaching championship unification match at TLC: Tables, Ladders & Chairs, the fans' "Yes!" chants forced Cena to go off-script and acknowledge Bryan.

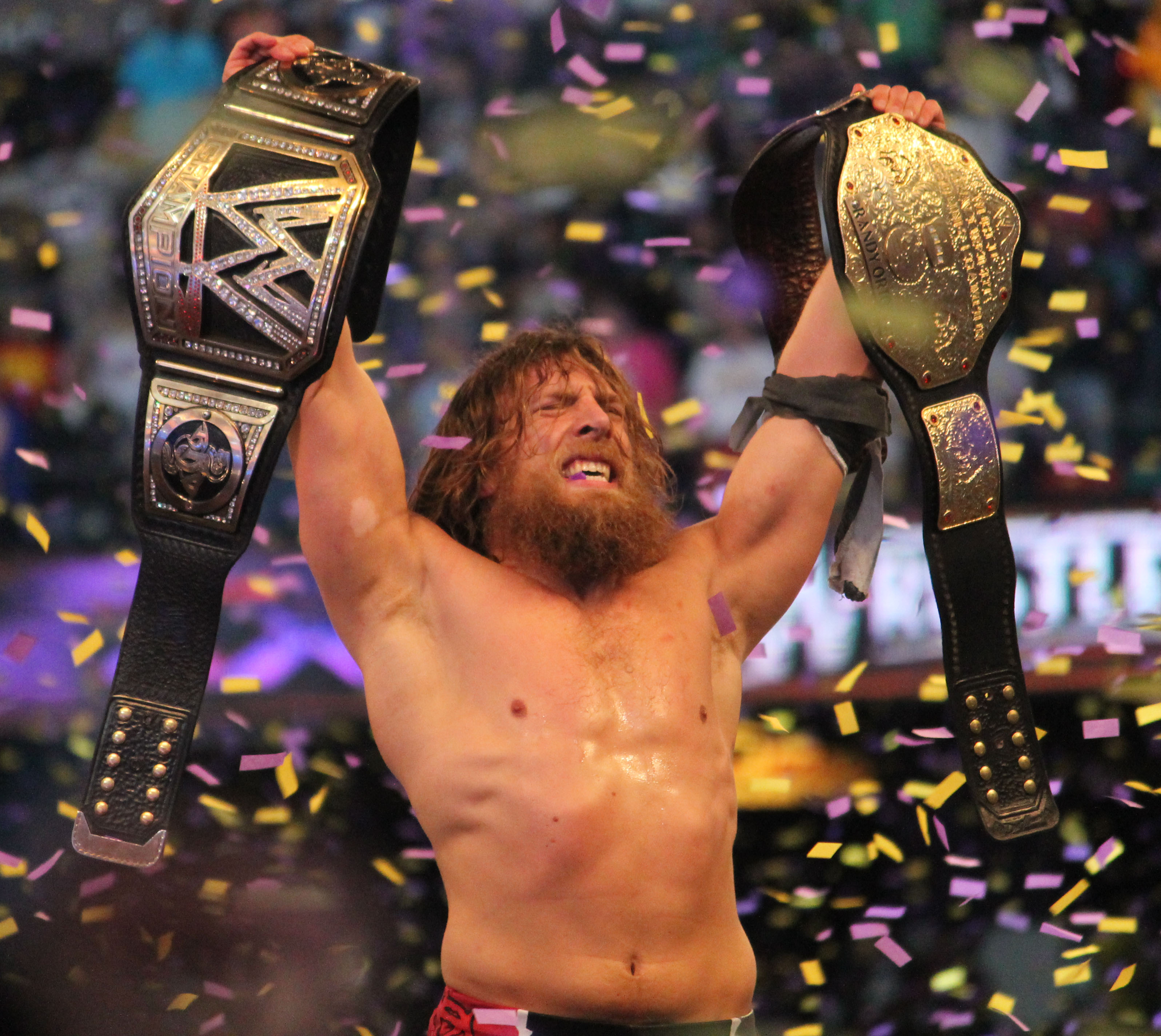
Daniel Bryan closed WrestleMania XXX by celebrating his win of the WWE World Heavyweight Championship.

Batista shockingly returned in January 2014 and won the 2014 Royal Rumble match. The negative reaction of the fans attending the event in Pittsburgh was so significant that it was reported as one of the major news items coming out of the event and described as the live audience engineering a "takeover" of the final two hours of the show. During the WWE World Heavyweight Championship match between Cena and Orton, fans booed both men and chanted for Bryan, with chants such as "This is awful." After the show was taken off the air, Batista, who had been presented on the air as a heroic babyface character, mocked Bryan and gestured his middle finger at the crowd.

On the March 10 episode of Raw, Bryan would "Occupy Raw" until Triple H gave in to his requests. During the March 24 episode the following week, Triple H would dub that point in time the beginning of the "Reality Era". At WrestleMania XXX Bryan would go on to defeat Triple H to earn a place in the main event where he faced Orton and Batista. He faced the two in a triple-threat match on the same night and won the WWE World Heavyweight Championship.

== Breakup of the Shield and rise of Roman Reigns ==
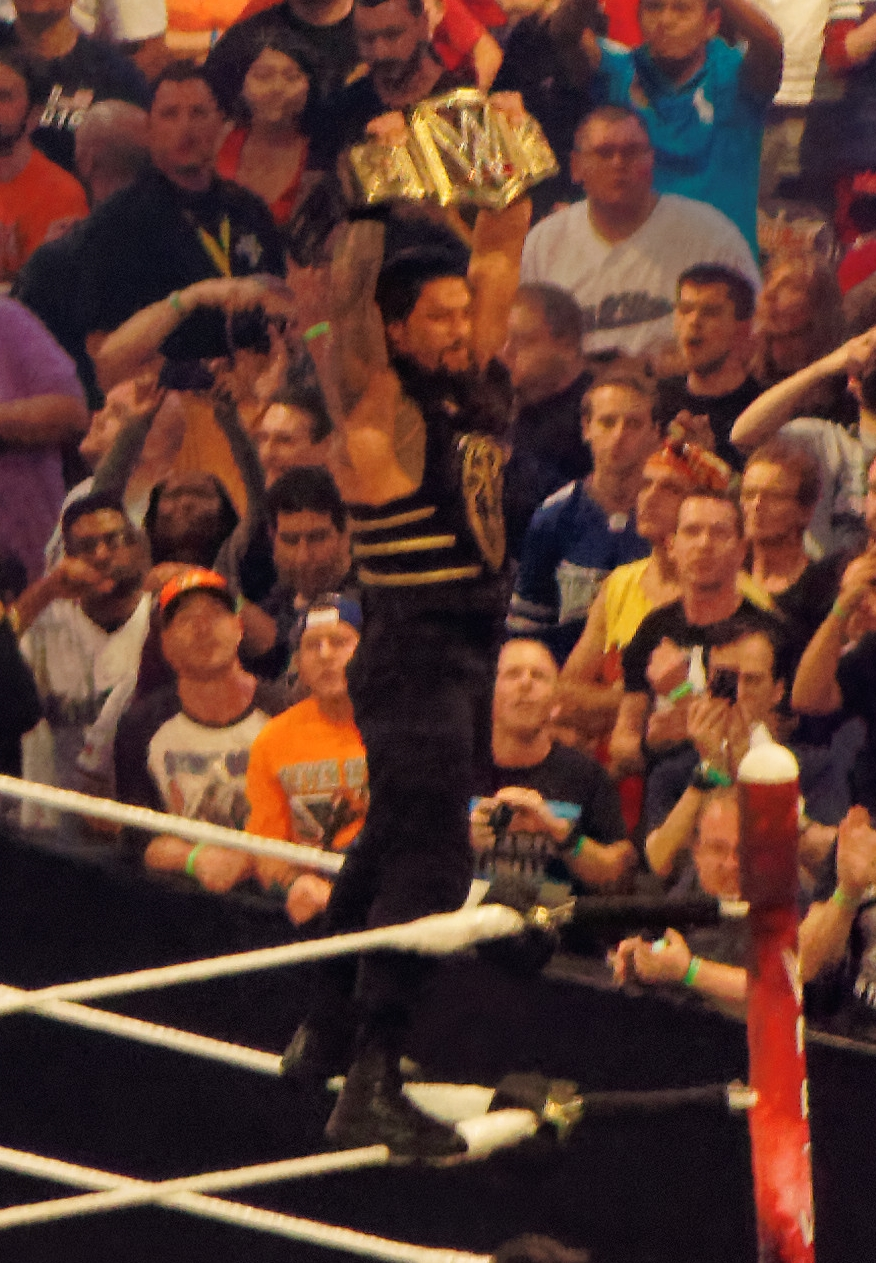
Roman Reigns (standing, holding belt) broke out as a huge star during this timeframe. He defeated Triple H in the main event of WrestleMania 32 to become a three-time WWE World Heavyweight Champion.

During Triple H's post-WrestleMania attack on Bryan on the April 7, 2014, episode of Raw, The Shield interfered on behalf of Bryan and saved him from the assault by Triple H, Batista, and Orton. This led to the three of them reforming their old stable Evolution. The two groups would then engage in a feud that saw The Shield defeat Evolution consecutively at the 2014 Extreme Rules and Payback events. On the June 2 episode of Raw, Triple H announced his intention to continue the recently reunited Evolution's feud with The Shield, despite Batista quitting WWE to focus on his acting career. Later that night The Shield was in the ring, Seth Rollins attacked stablemates Dean Ambrose and Roman Reigns with a steel chair. Rollins turned his back on The Shield, allying with The Authority.

Of the three, Roman Reigns would also receive a heavy push. It was during 2015 that John Cena slowly began to transition to a part time role and WWE began to establish Roman Reigns as the face of the company, which received polarizing reception from fans and critics, since having Reigns win the 2015 Royal rumble match on January 25, 2015. Yet, much like what happened to Cena, Reigns' increasing prominence in major storylines was met with fan backlash. At the 2015 Royal Rumble, Reigns received massive heat from the live crowd. Fans expressed their outrage during and after Fastlane where Reigns defeated the fan's favorite, Daniel Bryan. During the main event of WrestleMania 31 between Reigns and then-WWE World Heavyweight Champion Brock Lesnar, Rollins surprisingly cashed in his Money in the Bank contract in the climax. This turned the still-ongoing title match into a triple-threat match, and his eventual victory was met with a positive response. However, Rollins would be forced to vacate the title later on in October 2015 after an injury. At the 2015 Survivor Series event, a tournament for the vacant WWE World Heavyweight Championship was held, with Shield members Reigns and Ambrose making it to the finals and Reigns defeating Ambrose in the tournament final to win his first WWE World Heavyweight Championship. This received a mixed response from the fans. Reigns would then begin feuding with The Authority, culminating in the main event at WrestleMania 32. There he would defeat Triple H to win the WWE World Heavyweight Championship again after losing the title to Triple H at the Royal Rumble, wherein the title had to be defended in the royal rumble match.

WrestleMania 32 received a negative response, with many calling NXT TakeOver: Dallas which took place the day before WrestleMania on April 1, 2016, a far superior event and many citing the match between Shinsuke Nakamura and Sami Zayn at the event as the match of the year.

== Other notable occurrences ==
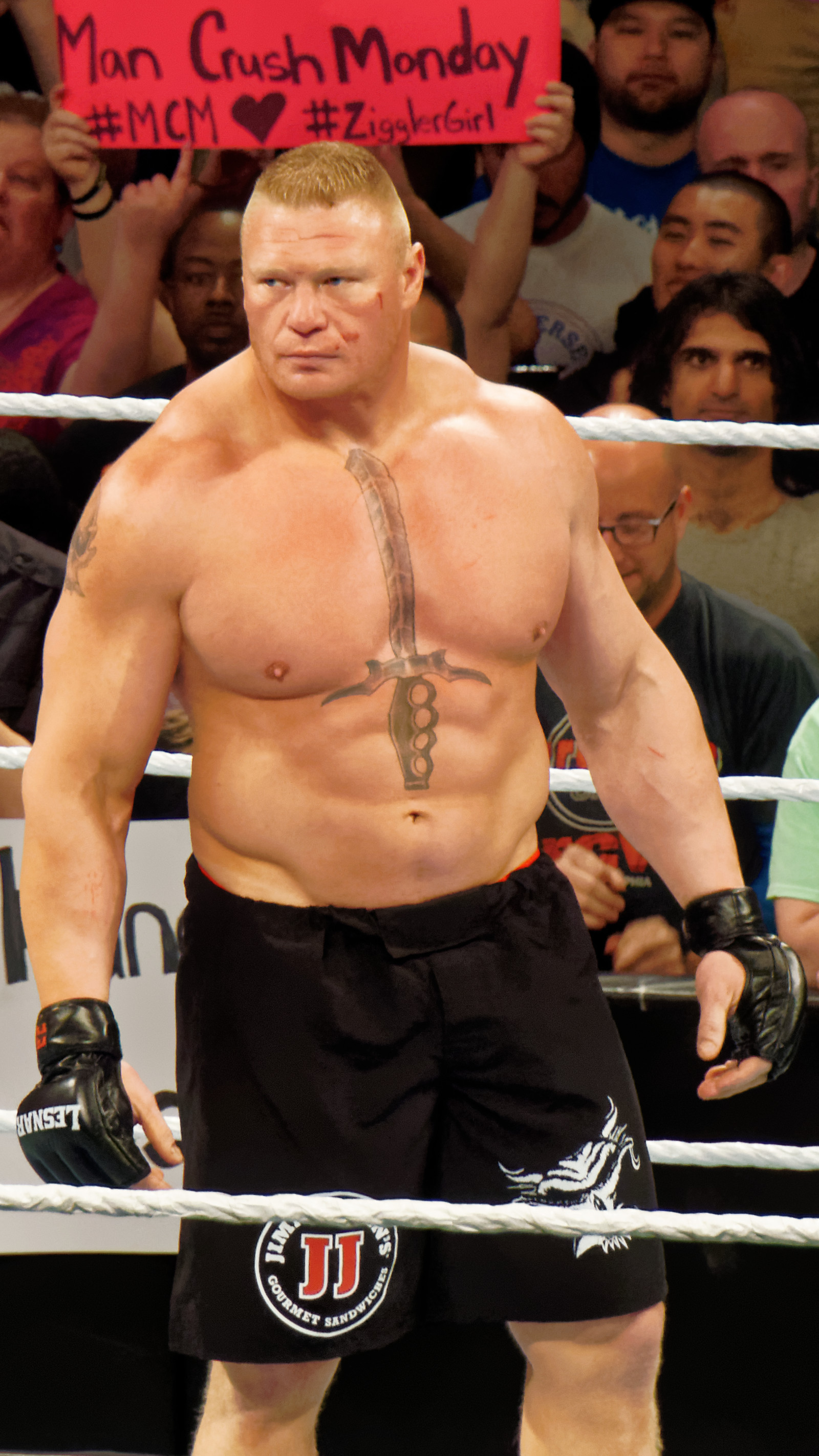
Brock Lesnar broke The Undertaker's undefeated WrestleMania streak

At WrestleMania XXX, The Undertaker's undefeated streak of 21 consecutive victories dating back to 1991 would be broken by Brock Lesnar. Lesnar would go on to defeat Cena at SummerSlam to win the WWE World Heavyweight Championship, winning his first WWE title in a decade. On the following episode of Raw, Brock Lesnar received a newly designed belt to represent the WWE Championship.

WCW wrestler Sting, who had previously been dubbed the "greatest wrestler to never wrestle in WWE," made his debut at the 2014 Survivor Series, helping Team Cena defeat Team Authority in a (5 on 5) Elimination Tag Team match, going on to have his first-ever match in WWE at WrestleMania 31 against Triple H in a losing effort.

Kevin Owens made his main roster debut at the 2015 Elimination Chamber event defeating top star John Cena in an upset but well-received victory. However, he lost their rematch at the 2015 Money in the Bank event. Despite that Rolling Stone named it the match of the year.

One of rival wrestling promotion TNA's most popular wrestler AJ Styles made his WWE debut at the 2016 Royal Rumble event in the Royal Rumble match that would be won by Triple H.

== The end of the era ==
The Reality Era moved to an end in the lead-up to Payback on May 1, 2016, an event that was being touted as the start of a "New Era." At Payback, The Authority would officially disband as WWE Chairman Vince McMahon announced that Stephanie and Shane McMahon would run Raw jointly.
