= PG Era =

Period of professional wrestling within WWE

WWE's logo continuation from when they transitioned to the TV-PG rating in 2008

The PG Era, also known as the Universe Era, is an era of professional wrestling within World Wrestling Entertainment, Inc. (WWE), which began on July 22, 2008, after its programming was labeled as TV-PG rating under the TV Parental Guidelines.

WWE instituted a number of changes as they began marketing to a younger audience, such as heavily scripting on-screen promos and toning down excessive violence, profanity and sexual content. The earlier parts of the era were defined by superhero-esque fan favorites and one-dimensional villains. In many ways, the company returned to a familiar format it previously utilized in the pre-Attitude days of the mid-1990s and earlier.

While WWE considers the PG Era to have ended in either 2013 or 2014 in favor of the Reality Era, some describe the PG Era as continuing longer since the 2008 changes remained in effect. (Note: Various sources have described the PG Era as being active past 2014, including Bleacher Report in 2018, Dave Meltzer and Súper Luchas in 2019, Fightful in 2020, and CinemaBlend in 2021.) (Note: On July 14, 2022, Andrew Zarian reported that Raw would begin airing with a TV-14 rating on the following episode. Zarian later reported that the deal had not been finalized. The initial report caused several sources to report that the PG Era had ended, including: Wrestling Observer Newsletter, Pro Wrestling Dot Net, Screen Rant, Súper Luchas, MSN, and Comic Book Resources. The following month, an updated report from PWInsider stated that "WWE is expected to remain TV-PG for the 'foreseeable future'".) The PG Era has received much criticism from fans due to its watered-down violence and family-friendly programming and characters, but it has also been praised as a good business decision as it made the promotion more appealing to a wider audience and corporate sponsors.

== Background ==
Upon the launch of the TV Parental Guidelines in 1997, the World Wrestling Federation (WWE's name until May 2002) programming was rated TV-PG. Beginning with the January 18, 1999 episode, Raw shifted to a TV-14 rating amidst direct competition with World Championship Wrestling's (WCW) flagship show Nitro during the Monday Night War. It remained with that rating until early June 2008. SmackDown has been rated TV-PG since its inception in 1999.

WWE promoter Vince McMahon stated that the Attitude Era of the late 1990s and early 2000s was the result of competition from WCW and forced the company to eliminate their competition. Due to WCW's demise in 2001, McMahon no longer had the need to appeal to viewers in the same way and that during the "far more scripted" PG Era, WWE could "give the audience what they want in a far more sophisticated way". WWE said that the move to TV-PG cut the "excess" of the Attitude Era and "ushered in a new era of refined and compelling storytelling".

While WWE had been slowly moving towards a more family-friendly format before it, Vice News wrote that this was accelerated after the Chris Benoit double-murder and suicide in 2007. Then-WWE Chief Executive Officer Linda McMahon described the transition away from TV-14 as a "cradle to the grave" approach to appeal to younger viewers and encourage brand loyalty. Bryan Alvarez and Lance Storm of the Wrestling Observer Newsletter attribute the move to TV-PG as a result of WWE appealing to sponsors, which was confirmed by former WWE Chief Marketing Officer Michelle Wilson.

WWE officially announced the move to TV-PG on July 22, 2008. The 2008 SummerSlam pay-per-view (PPV) was the first WWE PPV under the TV-PG rating. To appeal to younger viewers, WWE released the WWE Kids magazine in 2008, and debuted the kid-friendly Saturday Morning Slam television program in 2012. In 2013, WWE reported that their revenue had almost tripled since the move to TV-PG due to corporate partnerships from companies, such as Mattel and Post Cereals. However, the PG Era occurred during a time of gradually declining Nielsen ratings, which had begun after the demise of WCW but accelerated after Raw went to a three-hour format in 2012.

The PG Era's duration has been the subject of debate because most WWE programming never stopped having the TV-PG rating, although the company became less focused on family-friendly content over time. While WWE considers the PG Era to have ended in either 2013 or 2014, in favor of The Reality Era, various sources describe the era lasting into the late 2010s and 2020s.

== Changes in content ==
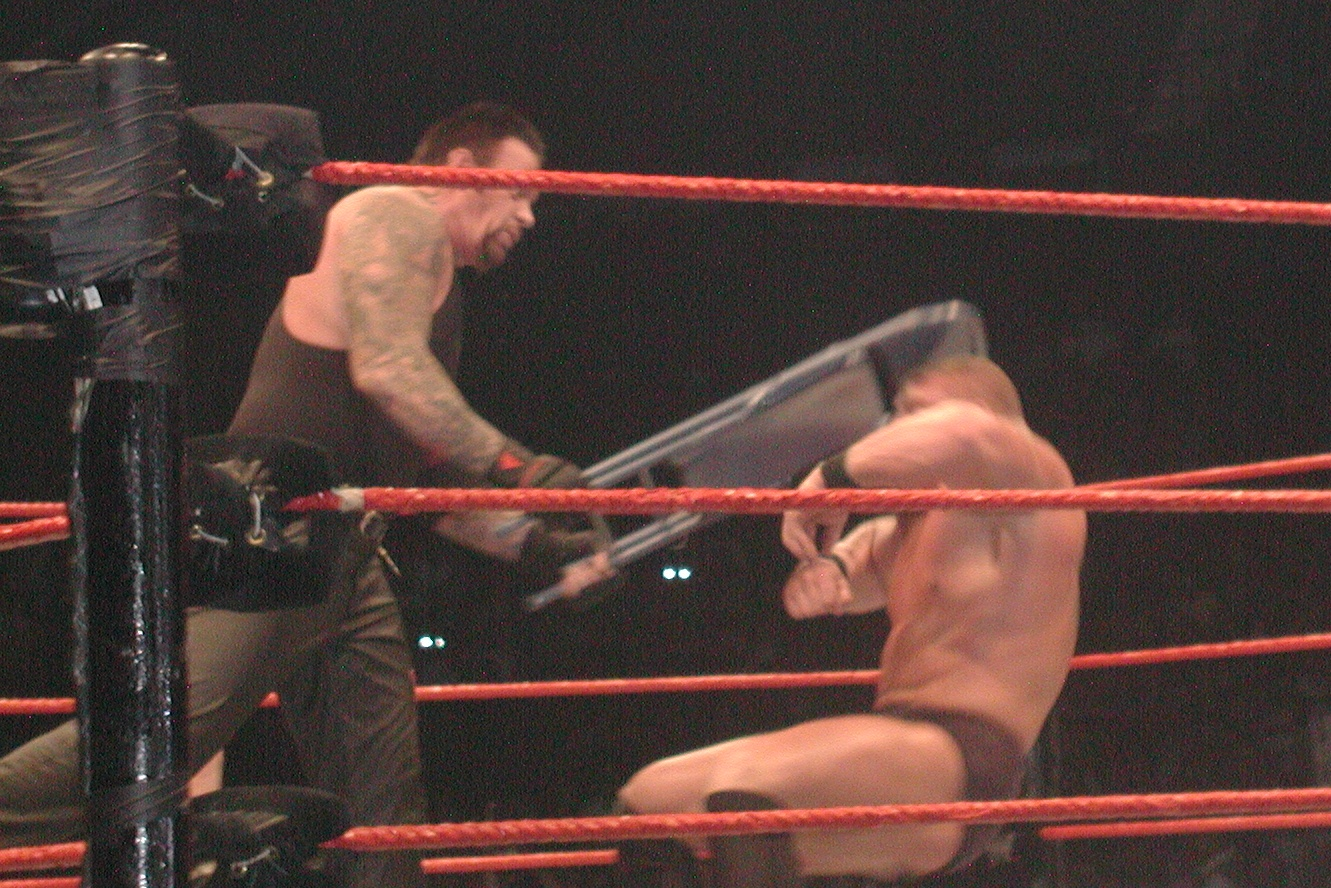
Chair shots to the head were banned in the PG Era.

As WWE reverted to a more family-friendly style, previous staples in their programming were altered or dropped. Use of profanity was scaled back. A few examples were when John Cena renamed his "FU" finisher to the "Attitude Adjustment" and when WWE changed the name of the One Night Stand PPV event to Extreme Rules to avoid the sexual connotations. Sexual content involving female wrestlers was heavily toned down, with bra and panties matches being discontinued in 2008. Excessive violence was also curtailed; chair shots to the head became increasingly rare after Chris Benoit's double murder suicide, and were completely banned in 2010. In 2011, following their match at WrestleMania XXVII, the Undertaker and Triple H were both fined for chair shots to the head, although the match was received positively among fans and critiques.

From 2008 to the mid-2010s, former WWE head writer Brian Gewirtz stated that the restrictions placed on the writers made it feel as if it was the "G Era" rather than the PG Era. Over time, these restrictions were eased as less emphasis was placed on making programming family-friendly. There were occasional reports that WWE was moving away from the TV-PG rating altogether; Vince McMahon denied one such report in 2019, stating that the promotion would be "a bit edgier, but remain in the PG environment". Dave Meltzer of the Wrestling Observer Newsletter considers the promos by The Rock and Paul Heyman featured in The Bloodline storyline between March and April 2024 as the end of the PG Era.

== Major storylines and stars ==
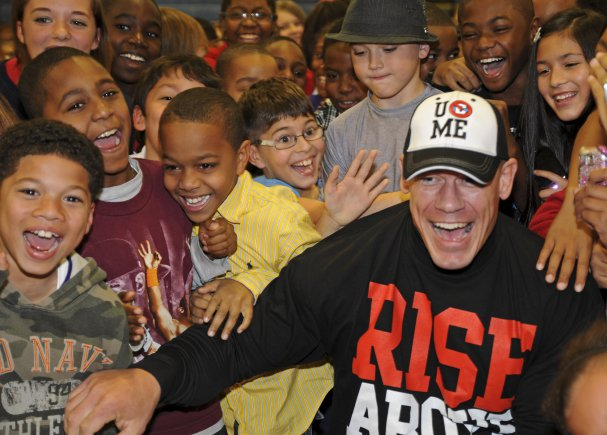
John Cena, seen here with child fans, was the biggest star in WWE during the PG Era.

Bleacher Report remarked, "Perhaps the most distinguishable characteristic of WWE's PG Era was its reliance on superhero-esque babyfaces." While John Cena was the biggest star in the company at that time, other major stars during that period included established holdovers (or returning performers) from prior WWE eras, including Randy Orton, Batista, Edge, and Rey Mysterio. The heroic characters were often placed against villains, such as Big Show, Alberto Del Rio, Mark Henry, and Jack Swagger, and The Miz. Veterans The Undertaker, Triple H, Shawn Michaels, The Rock, and Brock Lesnar were also featured in prominent matches throughout this time. Daniel Bryan, The Wyatt Family (Bray Wyatt, Luke Harper and Erick Rowan), and The Shield (Roman Reigns, Dean Ambrose, Seth Rollins) were some of the most prominent stars in WWE who made their debuts in this era. The Nexus storyline was heavily featured between 2010 and 2011, but critics panned the decision to have John Cena dominate the entire stable.

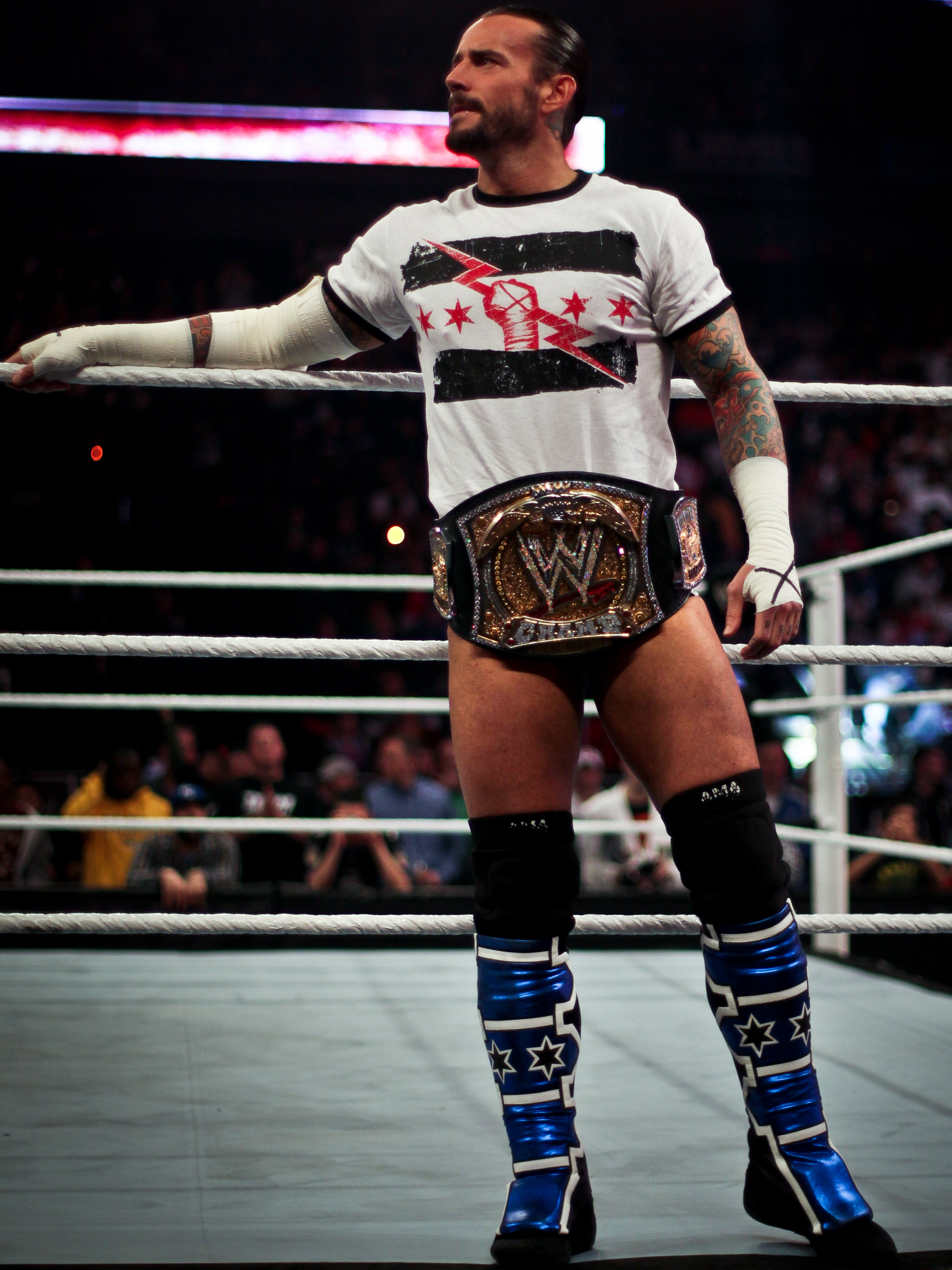
CM Punk became one of the most popular stars of the era, despite his character being edgier than most wrestlers during this time.

After Jeff Hardy won the WWE Championship at Armageddon in 2008, he feuded with CM Punk in 2009, which Conor Casey of ComicBook.com described as "shockingly real" despite the focus towards family-friendly content during the PG Era, as Punk referenced Hardy's real-life drug addiction. Their rivalry culminated in a TLC match at SummerSlam, which Punk won, and Hardy subsequently left the company. Punk became a "megastar" in the summer of 2011 during his feud with John Cena, the pinnacle of which saw him defeat Cena for the WWE Championship at Money in the Bank and SummerSlam in highly acclaimed matches. During this feud, Punk delivered a worked shoot promo, known as "The Pipebomb", with a style and tone far away from the typical TV-PG content. Bleacher Report wrote, "Punk turned the company on its head for a few short years and gave fans a taste of what an alternative to the advertiser-obsessed promotion could look like."

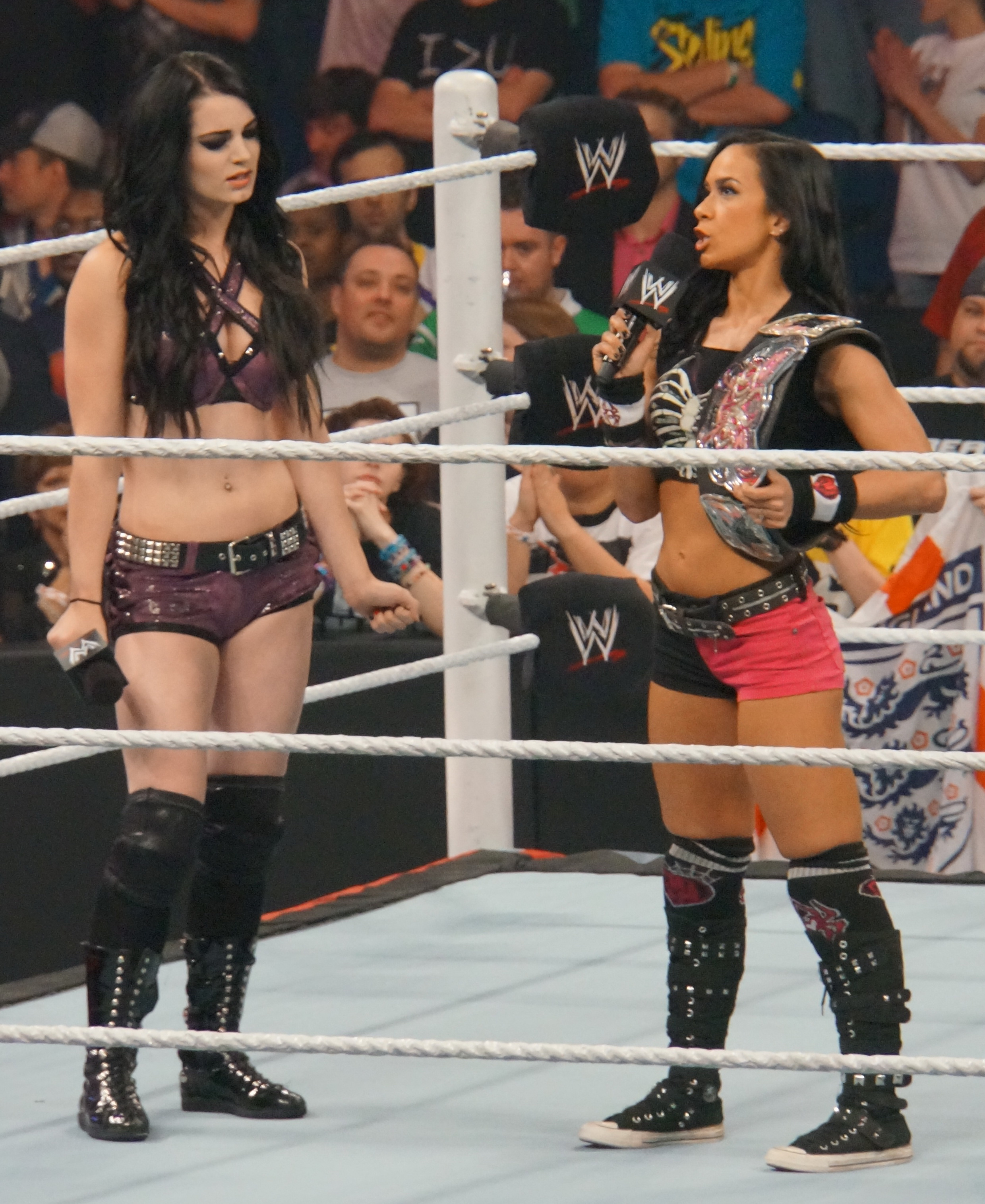
Paige and AJ Lee were two of the most prominent women in the later part of the PG Era.

During the earlier parts of the PG Era, Divas were treated as a sideshow to the men, similar to how they were presented in the 1970s and 1980s. In 2012, WWE hired Sara Del Rey as a trainer for NXT, and the developmental brand subsequently produced performers such as Charlotte Flair, Sasha Banks and Becky Lynch, whose performances were widely credited with helping elevate WWE's women’s division. AJ Lee took an integral part in main roster storylines that year, and Paige and Nikki Bella were later credited with having shifted women's matches toward more serious in-ring competition. Fan backlash over the handling of the women's division, including unequal television time, led to the Divas Revolution in 2015, boosted by the success of Flair, Banks, and Lynch as they arrived on the main roster.

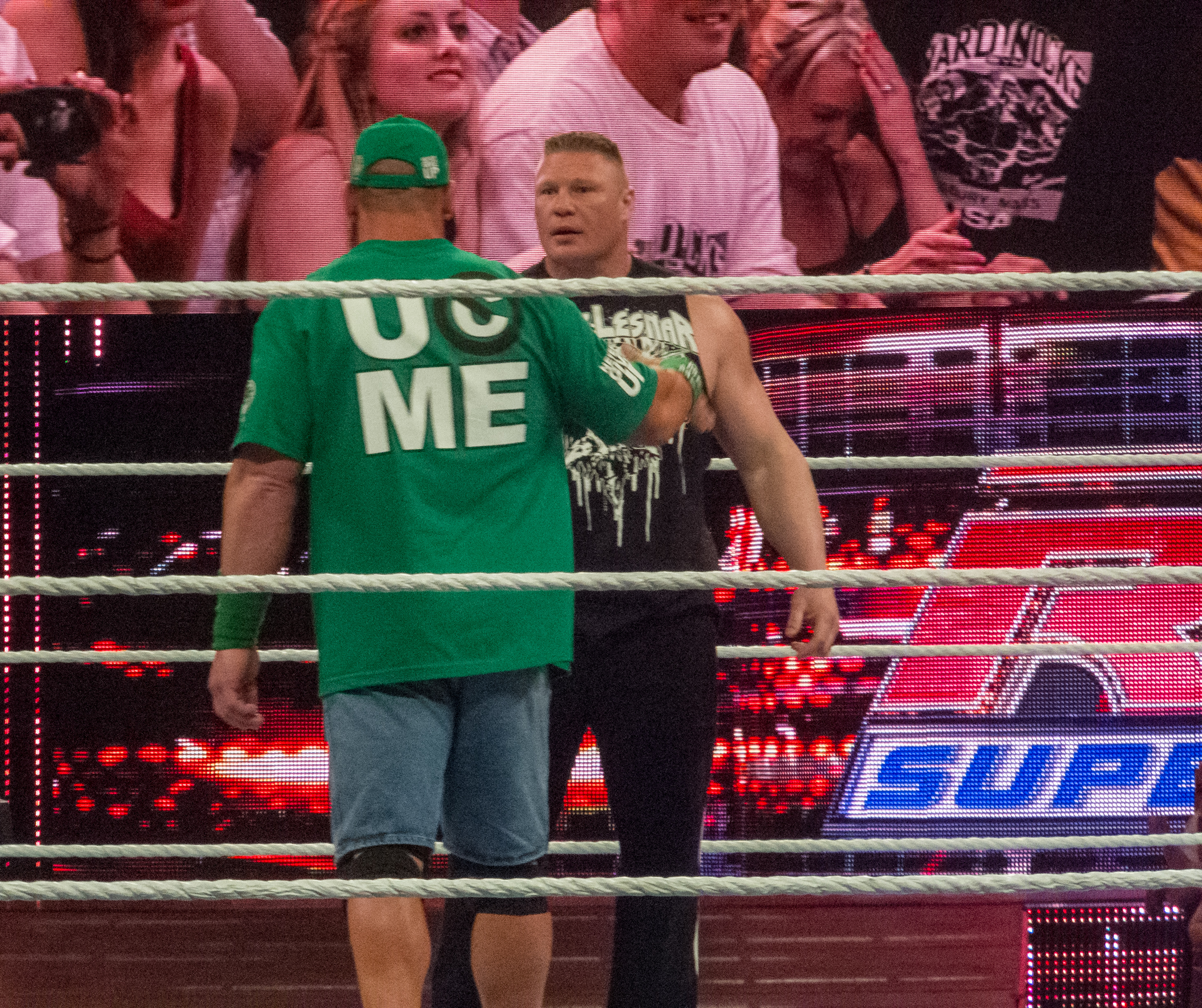
Brock Lesnar's match with John Cena at Extreme Rules 2012 was unusually violent for the PG Era.

Grantland columnist David Shoemaker wrote that while the path toward the Reality Era began with CM Punk's "insurrection", Brock Lesnar brought "a new era of wrestling legitimacy" when he returned in 2012. Lesnar's on-screen manager, Paul Heyman, referred to him as the "most non-PG ass kicker of the PG Era" and the violence in his return match with Cena at Extreme Rules in 2012 caused the event to receive a TV-14 rating on iTunes. While WWE considers the Reality Era to have begun in 2013 or 2014, Shoemaker wrote that the Reality Era reached its apex with the ascension of Daniel Bryan that year, ComicBook.com considers the end of the PG Era to have happened when CM Punk left the company after the Royal Rumble in 2014. In 2015, John Cena slowly began to transition to a part-time role as WWE began to establish Roman Reigns as the new face of the company, which received polarizing reception from fans and critics.

== Reception ==
=== Production values ===
The move to TV-PG programming was described by Bleacher Report as one of WWE's most controversial creative decisions. Bleacher Report also noted that it received much criticism from fans due to its watered-down violence and family-friendly programming and characters. The transition to TV-PG caused some fans to support WWE's competitors, with Pro Wrestling Torch writer James Caldwell commenting that WWE's programming resembled children's shows such as Barney & Friends and Blue's Clues when compared to Total Nonstop Action Wrestling (TNA), one of their closest competitors, were promoting more adult-oriented content during that time frame. Former WWE head writer Brian Gewirtz recalled that the company's writers joked about "adding in muppet characters" because they felt the scripts had become "ridiculous". Wrestling Observer Newsletter writer Bryan Alvarez was also critical of storylines throughout the period, but did not blame the TV-PG rating. Alvarez pointed out that much of the explicit Attitude Era programming had a TV-PG rating, while viewership declined in the Ruthless Aggression Era, which occurred while Raw had a TV-14 rating.

In contrast, some journalists praised the PG Era. Chris Mueller of the Bleacher Report opined that it was the right choice given the shifting times. He wrote, "The world is more politically correct, parents are more cautious about what their kids are watching, and advertisers are less willing to back controversial brands." Mueller praised the PG Era as a wise business decision because it made the promotion more appealing to corporate sponsors. Shortly after the transition, Miami Herald writer Jim Varsallone said that the changes in programming were too subtle for casual fans to notice and that he did not get complaints from fans. Despite his criticisms, Gewirtz noted that the era "[gained] respectability again with the advertisers and Hollywood in general. It made it 'safe' for moms and dads to watch with their kids."

Various wrestlers have praised the PG Era. Edge compared the PG Era favorably to the Attitude Era, stating that his matches were given more airtime because the Attitude Era was more focused on "the hijinks backstage" than in-ring action. The Miz said that the limitations of the PG Era made them more creative. Kurt Angle praised the era as being "good for wrestling" due to non-television reasons, such as the health and well-being of the wrestlers. Although John Cena sympathized with those who preferred the adult-oriented content, he described the PG Era as "more digestible," noting that operating under a PG platform significantly expanded WWE's global reach and enabled performers to gain more opportunities. In contrast, Batista criticized the era, stating that WWE was "in a bad moment" and attributed it to his departure from the promotion in 2010.

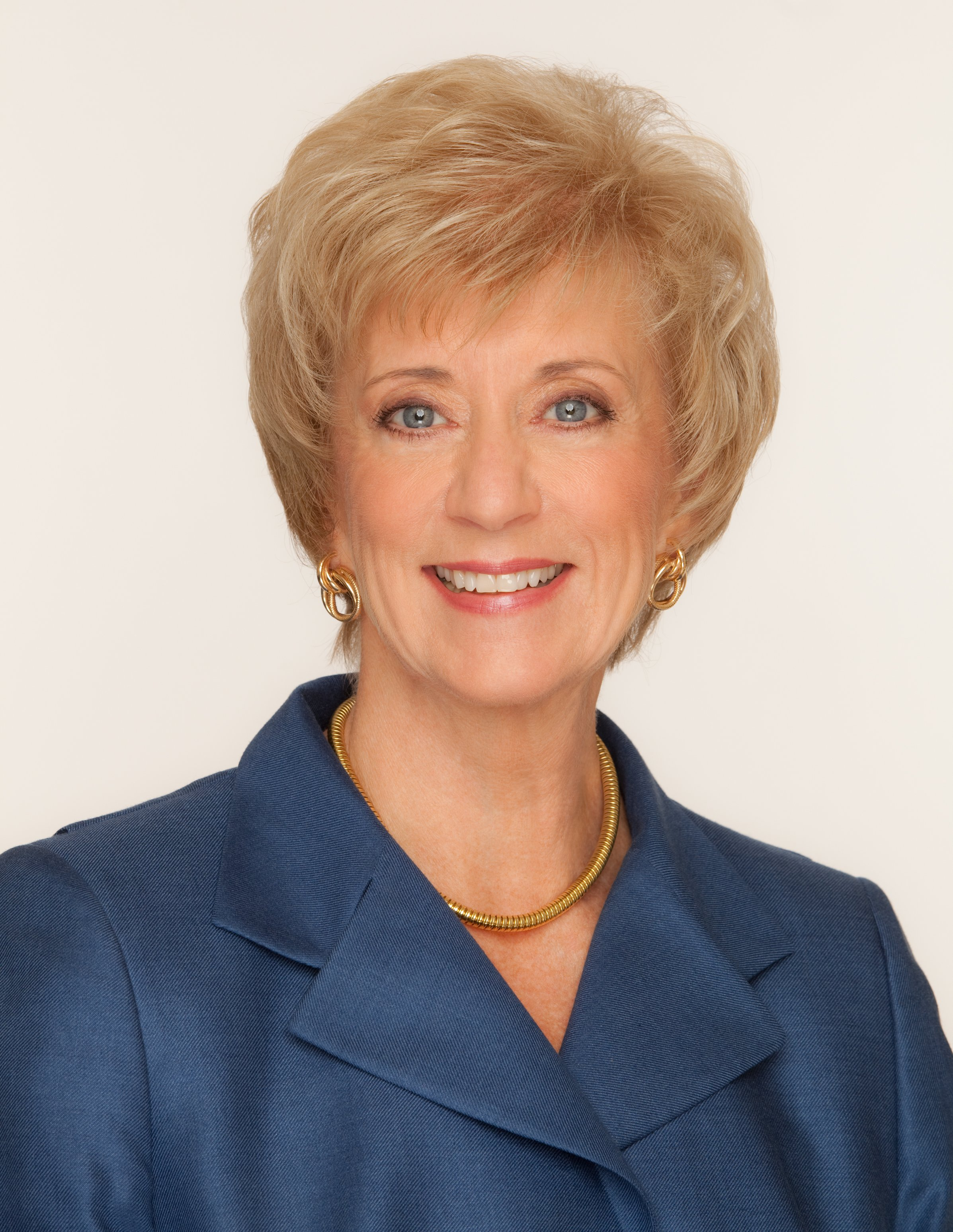
The transition to TV-PG was discussed during Linda McMahon's 2010 Senate campaign.

The transition to TV-PG became a subject of controversy during Linda McMahon's 2010 Senate campaign. US Senator Chris Dodd accused McMahon of trying to distance herself from professional wrestling, while Superstar Billy Graham said that the move to kid-friendly programming was done so that she would be a more appealing candidate. WWE denied these claims, stating that the 2008 transition to TV-PG occurred "long before McMahon announced her candidacy".

=== Match quality ===
Fans and critics have praised the improvement in match quality during the PG Era, noting while the Attitude Era focused mainly on out of the ring and backstage brawls, the PG Era focused on more in-ring action. The The Undertaker vs. Shawn Michaels match at WrestleMania 25 received widespread critical acclaim, with journalists and industry figures frequently citing it as one of the greatest matches in the history of professional wrestling due to its emotional storytelling, dramatic near-falls, and ring psychology. The John Cena vs. CM Punk match at Money in the Bank 2011 was the first match to be rated five stars under Dave Meltzer's star rating system since the The Undertaker vs. Shawn Michaels Hell in a Cell match at Badd Blood: In Your House in 1997, a feat never achieved during the entire Attitude Era.Despite the era's peak commercial success and high-profile storylines, no WWF match taking place within the chronological timeline of the Attitude Era (late 1997 to 2001) received a maximum five-star rating from journalist Dave Meltzer.

The No Disqualification match between CM Punk and Brock Lesnar at SummerSlam 2013 received widespread critical acclaim for its storytelling and physicality, later being named the Match of the Year by Bleacher Report. In 2013, under the supervision of superstar turned creative head Triple H, "WWE NXT" underwent a massive structural transformation, officially evolving from an independent, localized developmental territory into a fully integrated global pipeline and highly praised third brand producing high quality matches. In 2017 the revival of the classic WarGames match in NXT was highly praised by analysts for breaking the standard formatting tropes of WWE's PG era, serving as a key driver for the brand's reputation of delivering elite, critically acclaimed match quality. The Johnny Gargano vs. Andrade "Cien" Almas match at NXT TakeOver: Philadelphia in 2018 became the first match in the brand's history to receive a five-star rating from journalist Dave Meltzer, opening the floodgates for a wave of critically acclaimed, maximum-rated matches in NXT since then.
