= Public image of Roman Reigns =

Media coverage of an American wrestler

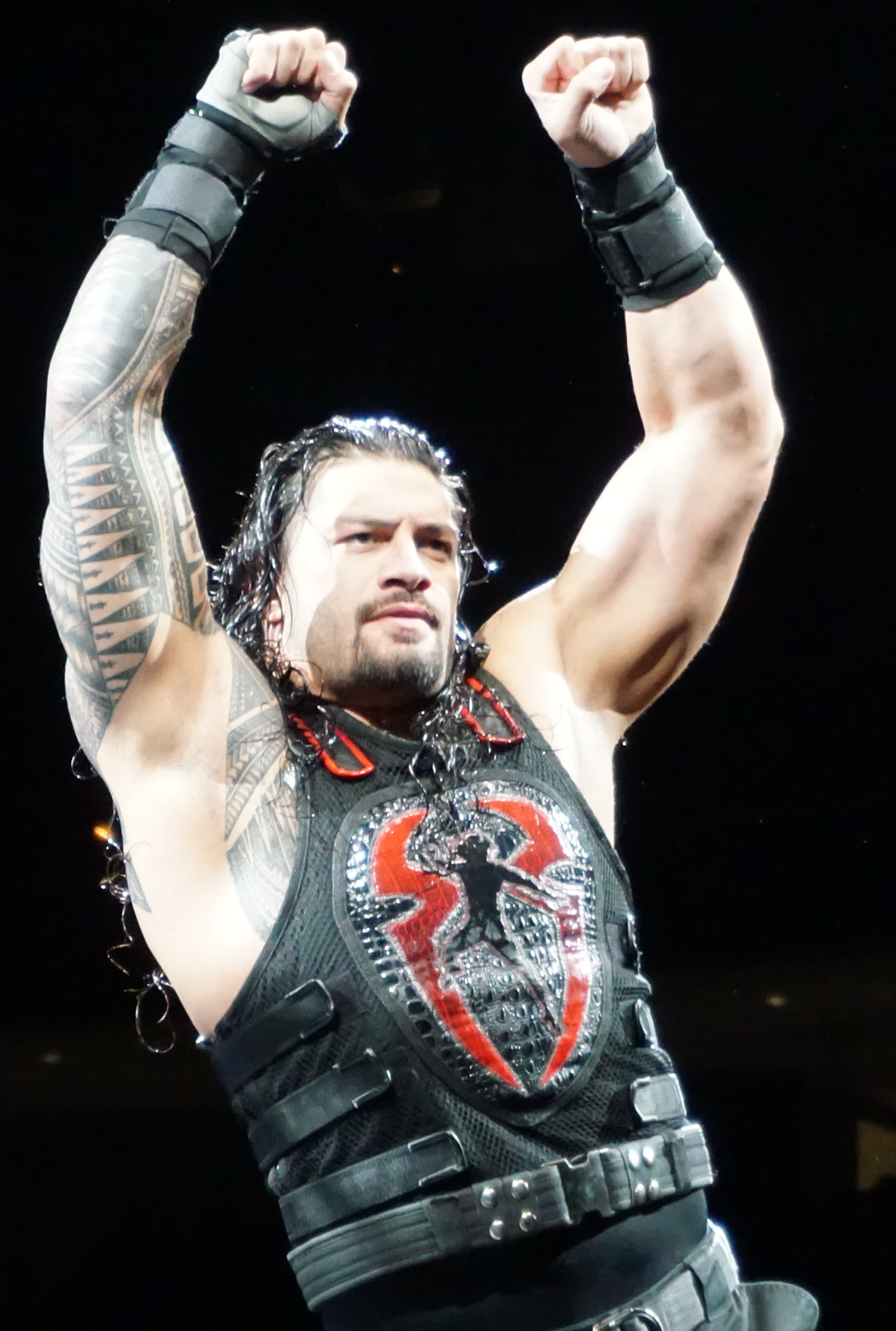
Roman Reigns in March 2018

Roman Reigns (born Joe Anoaʻi) is a professional wrestler who has been the subject of extensive media coverage and varying public perception throughout his career.

Reigns made his WWE main roster debut in November 2012 as part of the popular faction The Shield, after performing in the company's developmental system since 2010. Initially well-received, he faced increasing criticism following his 2014 transition to a heroic main event role, with fans reacting negatively to what was perceived as a heavily manufactured push, with his 2015 Royal Rumble victory receiving notable backlash. This culminated in Reigns headlining four consecutive WrestleMania events (2015–2018), each met with significant crowd rejection.

During his early years as a top star, fan backlash stemmed from various factors, including perceptions of favoritism, his wrestling style, promo ability, and overall character presentation. Media reactions varied, with Pro Wrestling Torch editor Wade Keller describing WWE's handling of Reigns as a "war on fans", while David Shoemaker of Grantland wrote that Reigns was the company's "most despised wrestler" in over 25 years, and Yahoo! Sports questioned whether he was "the biggest failure in professional wrestling history". WWE wrestler and WWE Hall of Fame member Bret Hart blamed WWE’s creative direction, arguing that Reigns' potential was undermined by poor storytelling. In 2016, Reigns was voted Most Overrated by Wrestling Observer Newsletter readers, as well as the Most Hated Wrestler of the Year by Pro Wrestling Illustrated readers, with Reigns being the first heroic ("babyface") character to receive the latter since the award's inception in 1972.

Reception shifted dramatically in 2020 when Reigns adopted a villainous persona as the "Tribal Chief" and led the Bloodline faction. This reinvention drew widespread critical acclaim, particularly during his multi-year reign as Undisputed WWE Universal Champion which received numerous awards from publications such as Wrestling Observer Newsletter and Pro Wrestling Illustrated. In 2024, following a return to a heroic role as the "Original Tribal Chief", Reigns again began receiving positive crowd reactions. Sports Illustrated remarked that WWE had "finally made Roman Reigns the monster babyface they always believed he could be."

== Wrestling persona ==
=== The Shield and initial reception (2012–2014) ===
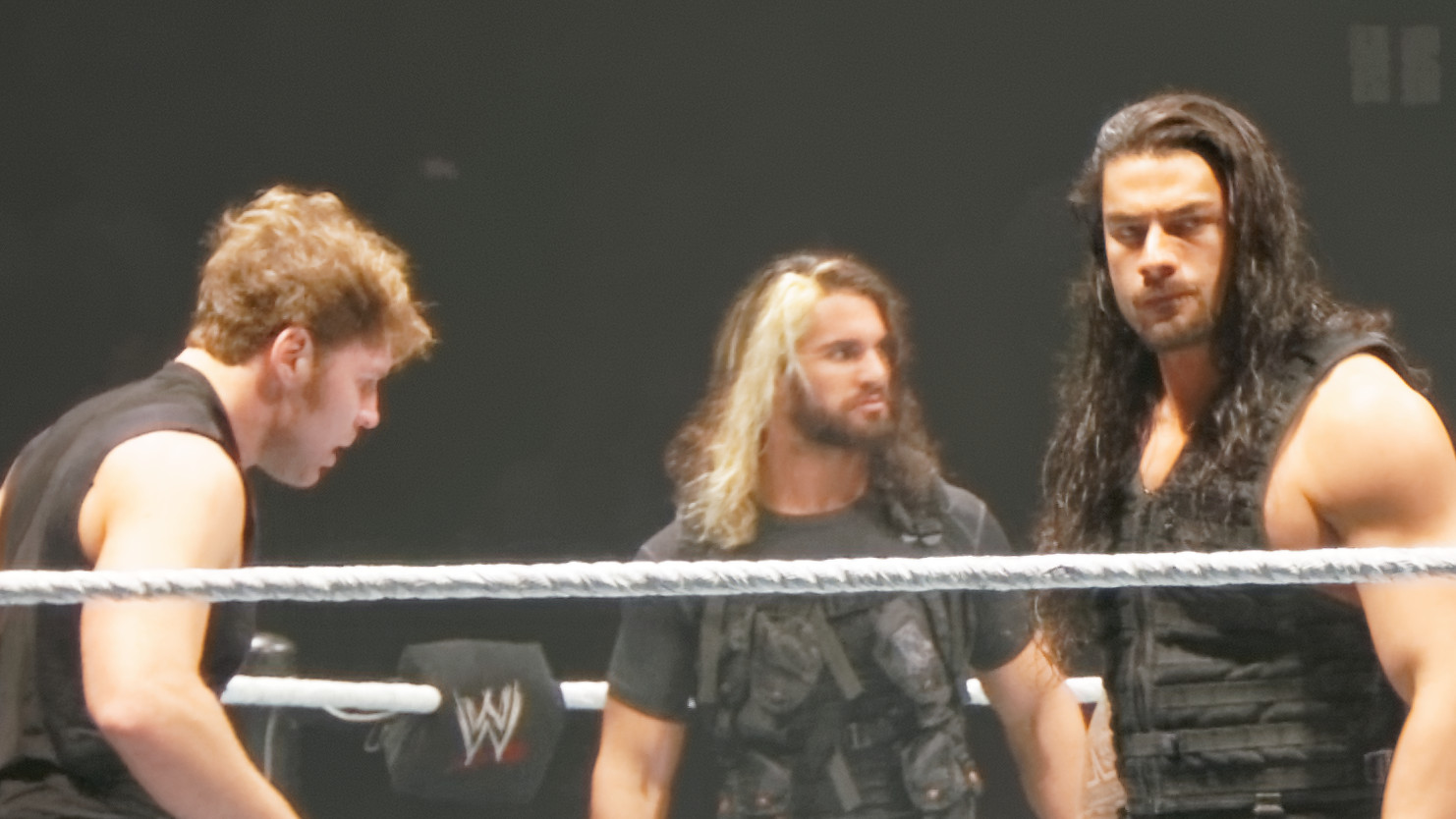
Reigns (right) as a member of The Shield in November 2013

While in NXT (the new developmental system) during 2012, Roman Reigns' character was described as a "businessman" who was "always dressed to impress" and viewed himself as "the most valuable commodity in WWE".

Reigns debuted to the main roster as part of The Shield on November 18, 2012, at Survivor Series. After transferring to WWE's main roster, his character was changed to the "powerhouse" and "heavy hitter" of The Shield, as well as an "exceptional athlete". Noted as the least talkative of The Shield members, Reigns' character was tweaked from "the quiet muscle" to being an "ultra-confident" source of leadership with "quiet strength" in mid-2013. CM Punk alleged in an interview that he was constantly reminded to make Reigns look "really, really strong" despite The Shield being booked to lose to Punk at the 2013 TLC: Tables, Ladders & Chairs event. In 2013, Reigns was voted the Most Improved by Wrestling Observer Newsletter readers.

During the 2014 Royal Rumble match on January 26, the live crowd cheered for Reigns over eventual winner Batista despite Reigns being a villain. Anoaʻi later acknowledged the reaction as "a cool situation". In mid-2014, Stone Cold Steve Austin said he saw great potential in Reigns, while David Shoemaker of Grantland wrote that Reigns had "mystery and intensity" as well as "superstar written all over him".

=== Controversial rise to main event status (2014–2016) ===
After The Shield disbanded for the first time, Reigns, unlike the other former Shield members, retained much of The Shield's aesthetic, including ring attire, a very slightly remixed version of the group's theme music, and ring entrance. From December 2014 to January 2015, Reigns' positive crowd reactions were diminishing. Reigns' win of WWE's 2014 Superstar of the Year Slammy Award garnered surprise to the point of accusations of vote-rigging, although both Dave Meltzer and Pro Wrestling Insider alleged the fan vote was legitimate. Writers from the Pro Wrestling Torch Newsletter criticized Reigns in 2014 and 2015, for a "very limited" in-ring moveset, "forced promo delivery", and a "petulant and annoyed" attitude ill-befitting of a top face character. Fellow professional wrestler Mikey Whipwreck said Reigns was "trying to be like John Cena", who was "very polarizing".

I don't think I'm headbutting with [hardcore fans], I feel like they are headbutting me. ... One thing that kind of confuses me is that it is a performance, it is a show, there is a storyline. When people start doing the 'He deserves this, He deserves that', really did Brad Pitt deserved [sic] to be Achilles in [the film] Troy?

— Anoa'i in a 2015 interview promoting WrestleMania 31 which he main-evented despite fans' rejection

What, y'all can't hear me or something? ... This isn't boring, baby, this is real life.

— Reigns' response to a heckling Chicago crowd during an October 2015 promo on Raw

Sometimes, as a former football player, we have to go into that away game and silence the crowd. ... And just let them know I am the man. I'm going to be here for a long time.

— Anoa'i commenting on crowds booing him en route to 2016's WrestleMania 32, where Reigns won its main event

At the 2015 Royal Rumble on January 25, Reigns was booed heavily after his victory despite portraying a heroic character. In February on WWE Raw, Paul Heyman praised Reigns as better than "any other guy in history", which garnered negative reactions as Heyman implied esteemed wrestling figures, including Bruno Sammartino, Hulk Hogan, André the Giant, Stone Cold Steve Austin, The Rock and John Cena, were inferior to Reigns. By March, Anoaʻi altered his character's physical appearance by wearing contact lenses in order to have blue eyes. From late 2014 to early 2015, various critics raised concerns that Reigns, despite being "not fully ready", was "being pushed too hard, too soon", while WWE tried to make him their next "flagship star", "no matter how fans reacted". Anoaʻi reacted by saying that he only entertained criticism of his wrestling by people that were involved with wrestling, discounting negative opinion by critics that "weren't wrestlers" and who wouldn't understand how to "lock up".

Going into WrestleMania in 2015, Dave Meltzer said that Reigns was the least over WrestleMania main eventer ever. At WrestleMania 31 on March 29, Pro Wrestling Torch described Reigns as needing security for his entrance while receiving "universal boos" and middle fingers. Reigns was unable to defeat Brock Lesnar for the WWE World Heavyweight Championship after Seth Rollins cashed in his Money in the Bank contract and pinned Reigns to win the world title. Rollins received positive reactions for his victory despite being a villain. Despite the fan backlash in early 2015, critics praised Reigns' performances at Fastlane, WrestleMania 31 and Extreme Rules as exceeding expectations while the negative reactions continued at Money in the Bank and SummerSlam.

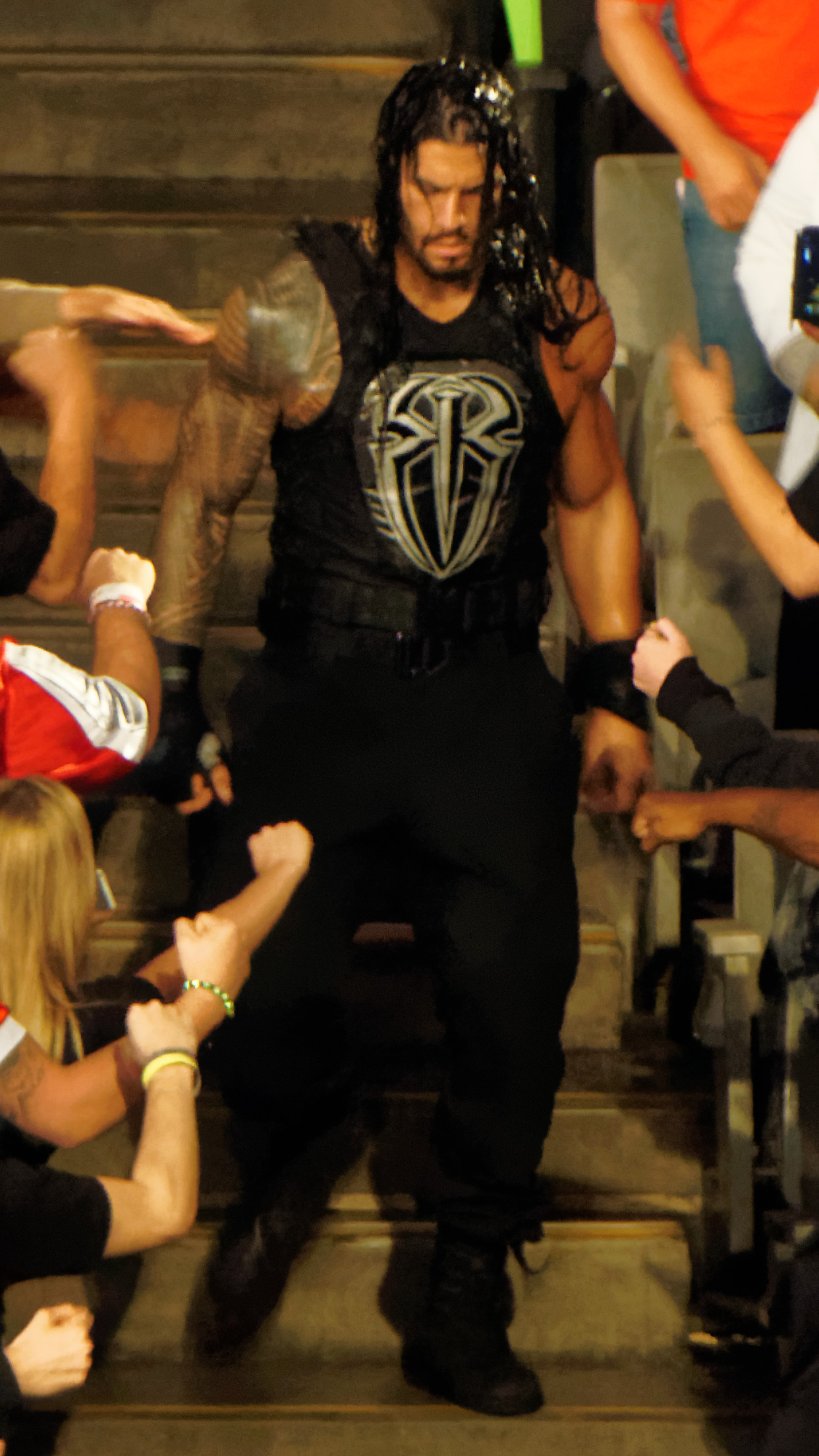
Unlike other Shield members, Reigns retained many of the group's characteristics after the split, such as entering through the crowd, doing so until early March 2016.

In late 2015, critics described WWE presenting Reigns' character as a "hard-luck underdog" chasing the world title, with WWE having "spent an overwhelming amount of time" on Reigns, "bending over backwards to create new obstacles for him to overcome ... at the expense of almost everyone else on the roster". In November 2015, Reigns received a "mixed, at best" reaction upon winning and losing his first WWE World Heavyweight Championship at the 2015 Survivor Series event after Sheamus, another villainous character, cashed in his Money in the Bank contract to defeat Reigns, a move made to try and get Reigns over with the crowd, and a positive reaction on winning his second world title at the Raw after TLC: Tables, Ladders & Chairs on December 14, although a WrestleView writer reflected that "it's been downhill ever since" for Reigns from then until March 2016. Reigns received a negative reaction when he won his third world title at WrestleMania 32. In 2015 and 2016, WWE has reportedly taken several measures to hide fans' disapproval of Reigns, including confiscating anti-Reigns fan signs, editing out anti-Reigns fan signs for photos on their website, muting hostile crowds (including at WrestleMania 32) and piping in canned cheers during Reigns' appearances.

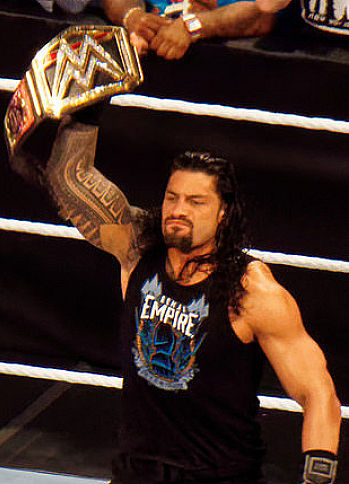
Reigns as WWE World Heavyweight Champion in April 2016

In 2016, Reigns main evented the first seven WWE pay-per-view events (before the brand split started) and was booed in all of them: Royal Rumble, Fastlane, WrestleMania 32 (which ended with a chorus of boos when Reigns won his third world title), Payback, Extreme Rules, Money in the Bank and Battleground. CNET described a "fan rebellion" against WWE "moving heaven and earth" to make Reigns "the face of the company ... for the next decade"; while "many fans are aware" that former Shield member Dean Ambrose "is the true dark horse, both on camera and behind the scenes". ESPN described that "WWE started building Roman Reigns as the next great hero of the company about 18 months ago", but Reigns instead became "the most despised wrestler WWE has had since it turned Sgt. Slaughter into an Iraq-sympathizing traitor in 1990".

Leading up to WrestleMania 32, Stone Cold Steve Austin, Rikishi and Hulk Hogan have encouraged WWE to turn him into a villain. Meanwhile, during interviews promoting WrestleMania 32, Anoa'i acknowledged the fan backlash, but declared that WWE is a "kids show" and that he was not wrestling to impress "grown men" who boo him. He defiantly told his critics that he would not believe any of their negative opinions of him. As for his detractors, Anoa'i told them to "continue to be ready to boo. You're going to be mad a long time. I'm not going away".

=== WWE World Heavyweight Champion and suspension (2016–2017) ===
On the Raw after WrestleMania 32, Reigns declared that he was now not a "bad guy" nor a "good guy", but "The Guy", which supposedly indicated a morally ambiguous character turn, but this went nowhere. In April, Pro Wrestling Dot Net reported that WWE "went out of their way to use [the charity] Make A Wish in hopes of getting [Reigns] over as a good guy". As soon as broadcasting for Payback on May 1 stopped, Reigns reportedly turned on the crowd, yelling angrily at them. Also in May, Dave Meltzer said WWE wanted Reigns as "the guy who does the charity work, so he has to be positioned as a babyface" (the heroic character), adding that WWE's "new gimmick" was positioning that people actually "really like" Reigns and only boo because "it's fun to boo him", which Meltzer said was "absolutely not true" in reality. Critics wondered if WWE was "leaving money on the table" by not slotting former Shield teammate Seth Rollins as a fan favorite and Reigns as a villain, as fans were cheering Rollins and booing Reigns. In June, Reigns wrestled against Rollins at both Money in the Bank and the next night on Raw, where Reigns played a villain in the first match and a fan favorite in the second, while on the next night on Raw during his promo he told the fans who were booing him to "shut their mouths". Reigns' wellness policy suspension on June 21 resulted in Yahoo! TV urging WWE to "quit pretending he's some kind of lovable underdog" with a villain turn for Reigns, after wasting a "dozen" chances "since the boos first reigned" at the 2015 Royal Rumble.

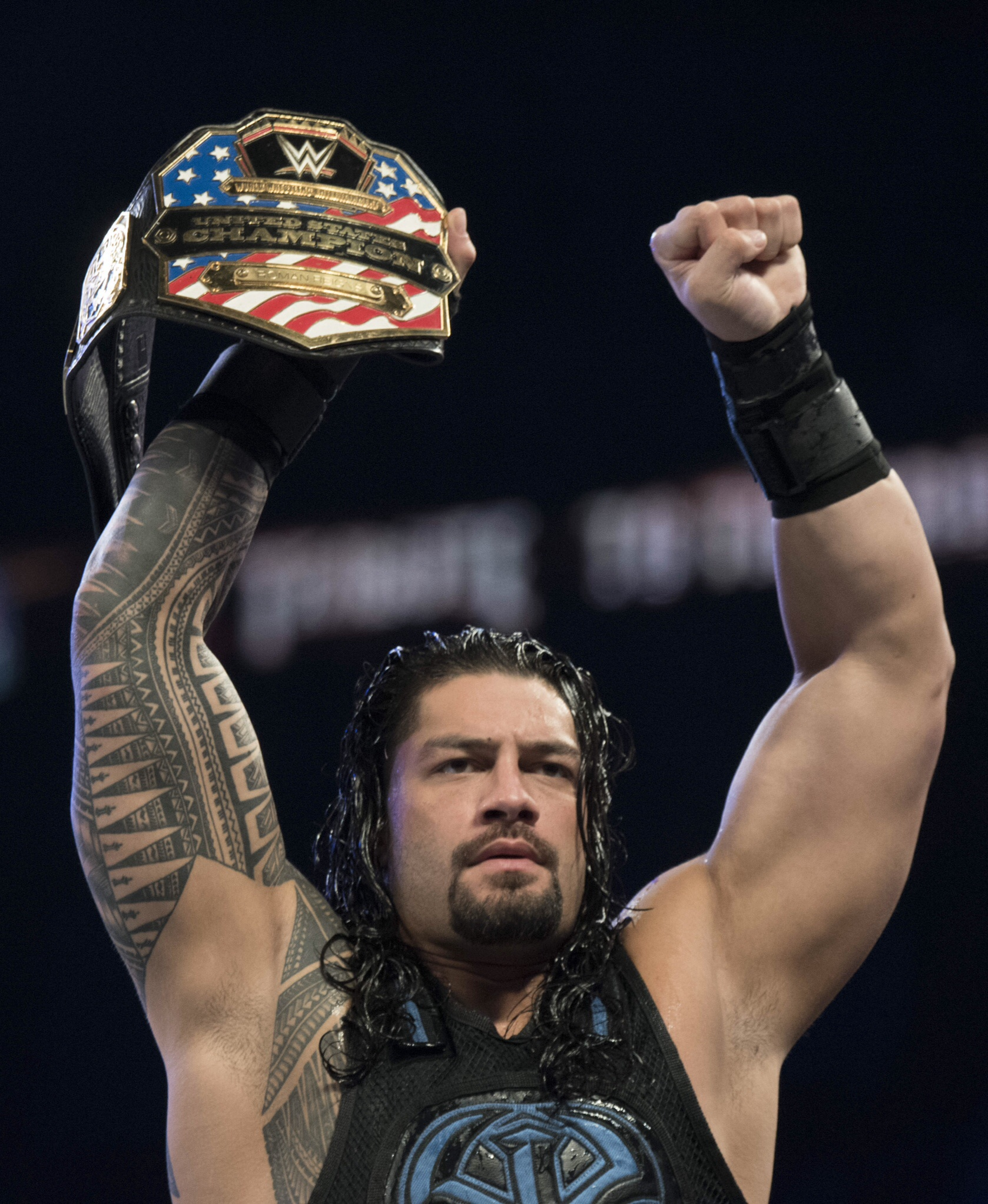
Reigns as WWE United States Champion in December 2016

As soon as Reigns returned from suspension in July and leading into SummerSlam, writers from the Pro Wrestling Torch Newsletter wrote that Raw was "still the Roman Reigns Show", "with him necessarily closing out the show with the last laugh" (post-SummerSlam, "Raw is Roman" continued). Also in August, Anoa'i no longer wore the contact lenses, again changing the Reigns' character look. Although Reigns dropped from world title contention to being United States Champion in September, he remained unable to connect with fans. Nonetheless, calculated efforts to garner crowd support persisted. Wade Keller of the Pro Wrestling Torch said that WWE was damaging its product by associating Reigns with "really good" and "popular" performers in a "hapless attempt" to get him over. Pro Wrestling Dot Net columnist Jason Powell said that McMahon's "obsession" with generating support for Reigns had handicapped Seth Rollins, whom fans wanted to see as a fan favorite in May, but was kept as a villain to oppose the heroic (and thoroughly booed) Reigns until a "horrible" turn into a fan favorite in September.

In November 2016, Fin Martin of Power Slam remarked: "Vince [McMahon] has successfully trained or retrained most of his audience to consume what he is serving. Roman Reigns being the exception, of course. It says something that fans will cheer Shane McMahon's toe-curlingly naff attempts at pro wrestling in the ring and his entrance dance ... yet they won't cheer for Reigns, no matter how heroically he is portrayed". As a result of his achievements in 2016, despite topping Pro Wrestling Illustrated (PWI) annual PWI 500, which is mainly about kayfabe results, Reigns was voted by Pro Wrestling Illustrated readers as Most Hated Wrestler of the Year, a first for a heroic character since the award was devised in 1972. Wrestling Observer Newsletter readers instead awarded Reigns the 2016 Most Overrated award. Reigns had finished in second place for Most Overrated in both 2014 and 2015. In January 2017, Pro Wrestling Torch began their weekly "Monday Night Reigns-o-meter", which monitored his "ability to beat the odds and come out on top".

I think it just pushed me. ... Some people look at that as a negative, not me. ... X amount of thousands of people are screaming, booing at the top of their lungs, and I'm the center of attention, so I must be doing something right.

— Anoa'i describing his reaction to being booed, in an ESPN audio interview released in January 2017

Going into 2017, WWE continued to edit reactions for Reigns, one example being after he lost the United States Championship to Chris Jericho, when an audience member was shown live jumping for joy at the result, but when WWE showed replays of Reigns' loss they showed a clip of the same fan looking unhappy. Veteran wrestler Stone Cold Steve Austin and Pro Wrestling Torch editor Wade Keller criticised Reigns' attitude in mainstream interviews, specifically Reigns stating that he "just" worked 9-to-5 before becoming a professional wrestler as well as flaunting his financial prospects within WWE, with Austin saying Reigns has "got to watch" what he says and needs to be "smarter" while Keller saw him as "trying to impress the people interviewing him" and "not thinking about the fans who are paying the money for the seats". Keller also scolded Reigns and WWE for publicly claiming they are happy with any crowd reaction for Reigns, whether positive or negative, describing such statements as "insincere" and "spin" since they "turn the volume down; they seek out fans who are cheering him; they doctor footage to make it seem like fans are cheering him when they're not ... they manipulate in every way that they can to make it seem like he's not getting a negative reaction".

In the 2017 Royal Rumble match on January 29, Reigns entered as the surprise last entrant despite losing a WWE Universal Championship match against Kevin Owens earlier that night. Fans had anticipated other surprise entrants including Finn Bálor, Kurt Angle, Samoa Joe, Shinsuke Nakamura and Kenny Omega—international media outlets noted that this drew "This is bullshit!" chants from the live crowd and even more boos when he eliminated The Undertaker. Reigns was still booed after eliminating villain wrestlers Chris Jericho and Bray Wyatt. Stone Cold Steve Austin believed that Reigns was the "set up guy" and "did a favor" to help Randy Orton by letting Orton eliminate him to win the Royal Rumble. The following night on Raw, the villainous Braun Strowman received a "Thank you Strowman!" chant for costing Reigns his WWE Universal Championship match at the Royal Rumble. This chant was repeated after Strowman cost Reigns a match on the February 6 episode Raw, with Tom Colohue of Pro Wrestling Torch writing that Strowman's vendetta against Reigns may have "accidentally turned" the villain into a fan favorite. In February 2017, Meltzer said it was "obvious" that WWE's push of Reigns "will never end". Later that month, wrestling podcaster Peter Rosenberg lamented that—unlike the similarly powerful Hulk Hogan—Reigns "doesn't show vulnerability, ever".

=== Continued push and fan revolt (2017–2018) ===
On March 5 at Fastlane, Reigns defeated Strowman and became the first man to successfully pin him in WWE. Although the match itself was praised, this booking choice was poorly received by critics, who agreed that, despite adding nothing to Reigns' reputation, the match's ending would severely hurt Strowman's "unstoppable beast" image, "undid" all the momentum Strowman had acquired during the previous months and might even damage his career and future in WWE. Many believed that a better, more logical booking move would have been for The Undertaker, who was heavily rumored to face Reigns at WrestleMania 33 after Reigns eliminated him during the Royal Rumble match, to interfere in the match, causing Reigns to either win by disqualification, thus letting Strowman remain unpinned, or lose because of The Undertaker, thus still looking strong. The rumor ended up being true and Reigns and The Undertaker had a face-off on the March 6 episode of Raw, hinting a confrontation at WrestleMania 33. The crowd chanted "Roman sucks!" loudly during both Reigns' entrance and the face-off between the two, but when releasing the video on their YouTube channel WWE edited the audio to make those chants inaudible, which led to many media outlets reporting and criticizing the edit. Wade Keller of Pro Wrestling Torch noted that "the crowd popped" for Shawn Michaels when he came out for a promo with Reigns on the March 13 episode of Raw, but then booed Michaels after he endorsed Reigns, who would again be beaten down by Strowman to the delight of the crowd. Keller's colleague Tom Colohue noted that "everybody wants [Reigns] to fail", but applauded his "simple, effective promo" that was "probably the best work Roman's ever done on the mic".

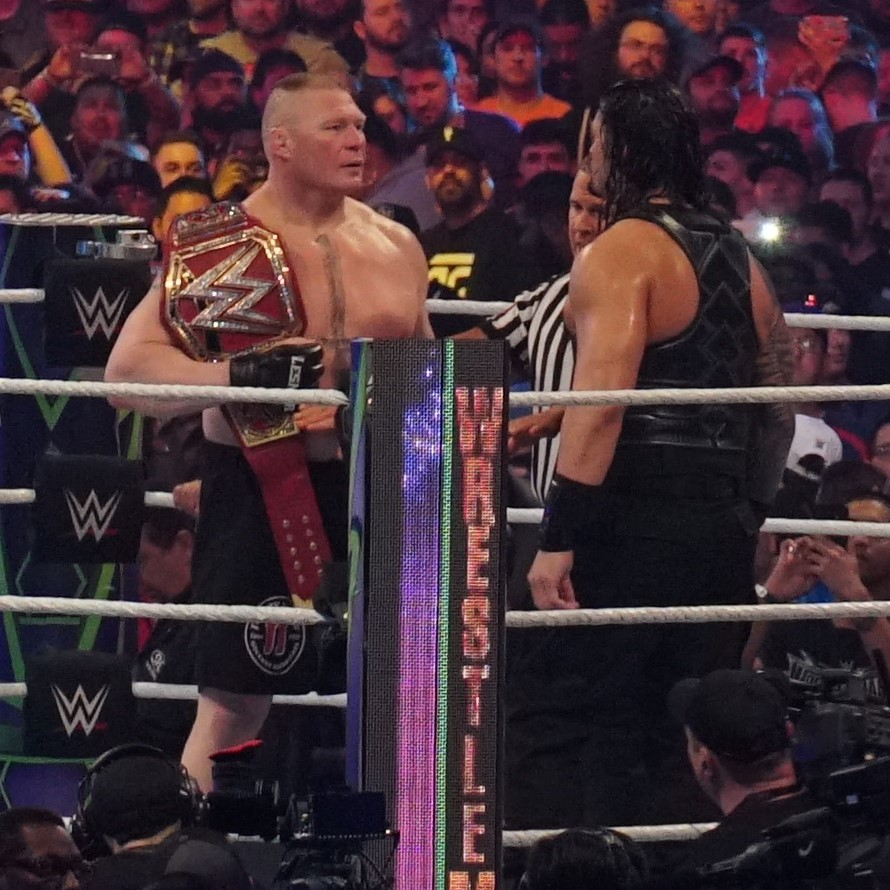
Reigns would feud with Brock Lesnar for the Universal Championship from April to August 2018. Their matches were met with particular contempt from critics and audiences.

In March 2017, Dave Meltzer reported that WWE's long term plans ("which obviously could change") for 2018's WrestleMania 34 was to "once again build for a year and have the big coronation" for Reigns, who would still be a heroic character "between now and then" and beat Brock Lesnar for the WWE Universal Championship "to fully replace John Cena as the face of the company", while the "idea" for Lesnar's role "for this year now" was "to become a monster, be unbeatable, run through everybody, beat them with one F-5 and then lose to Roman Reigns". At WrestleMania 33 on April 2, Reigns was booed before, during and after the main event (his third WrestleMania main event in a row), which saw Reigns beating The Undertaker, who seemingly retired (although he eventually returned).

Before the match, Pro Wrestling Insider's Dave Scherer predicted that if Reigns beat and retired The Undertaker, then "the fans that hate him will hate him forever". Critics reported that after the match, WWE "did clearly turn down the sound" from the audience "and then they hit the pyro", but boos were still heard during a break in Reigns' music being played. On the Raw after WrestleMania, Reigns was loudly booed and the crowd microphone volumes were turned down when he appeared, but multiple chants of "Delete", "Fuck you, Roman", "You suck", "Asshole", "Roman sucks", "Shut the fuck up" and "Go away" were still heard before Reigns chose to speak. After that segment, WWE commentators labelled the post-WrestleMania 33 crowd as "non-traditional WWE fans" who may cheer for those they normally boo and boo those they normally cheer "all in the name of fun", which echoed similar comments a year prior for the post-WrestleMania 32 crowd. Pro Wrestling Torch editor Wade Keller wrote that these comments would anger fans as "genuine dissatisfaction with the product is reframed by Vince McMahon's propaganda machine" – Undertaker received the usual reaction from fans, as did Reigns, just more intensely. Following Reigns' victory over The Undertaker and given that Reigns was reportedly selling more merchandise than any other full-time WWE wrestler (John Cena, who sold more, was considered a part-timer), Forbes writer Blake Oestriecher declared Reigns as "indeed the new face of WWE, one who could remain in that spot for the next decade".

Great Balls of Fire saw a post-match attack by Reigns after he lost an ambulance match to Strowman, which was widely described as the protagonist Reigns attempting to murder the villainous Strowman. As a result, there has been some speculation on whether or not this angle was a double turn (where Reigns and Strowman swap roles as the hero and the villain), with Reigns being described as a "sore loser" attacking Strowman, who won fairly to the stipulation, to the point of attempted murder. However, nothing of this sort ultimately came to fruition and Reigns was even awarded a WWE Universal Championship shot at SummerSlam with speculation that the plans for Reigns to face Lesnar at WrestleMania 34 had been changed. At the event on August 20, Lesnar retained the title by pinning Reigns in a match also involving Strowman and Samoa Joe. Meltzer claimed that the plans for the Lesnar–Reigns match at WrestleMania 34 were scrapped, but after seeing Reigns get pinned by Lesnar, he stated that the plans might still be in place. In September on Raw, both (storyline) general manager Kurt Angle and commentator Corey Graves described Reigns as a wrestling "icon". At No Mercy, Reigns defeated John Cena, seemingly ending Cena's full-time wrestling career as this was seen as a "passing of the torch" moment in which Reigns had indeed replaced Cena as the face of the company. During the match, Reigns was booked to kick out of four Attitude Adjustments (one of which was off the top rope) and then defeated Cena with two spears. In October 2017, Reigns was revealed as the highest rated wrestler in the WWE 2K18 game. GamesRadar+ wrote that "this is likely a call made by WWE ... rather than [game] developer 2K" and that by ranking Reigns higher than historic wrestlers "in their prime" like the 1997 version of the Stone Cold Steve Austin character, Reigns is being treated as the "greatest wrestler of all-time".

In a December 2017 interview, Anoaʻi called himself "the best performer, in-ring, in the world right now". In response, Brian Campbell of CBS Sports wrote that Anoaʻi "isn't even the best performer in his own company" and "wouldn't even finish in the top five" in the world. Meanwhile, fellow wrestler Kenny Omega commented that "it sounds so ridiculous" and that there was "no possible way" Anoaʻi believed what he said. Also that month, WWE vice president Triple H said regarding Reigns: "I think he is one of the best that WWE have right now ... the truth is, and some people will listen to this and want to argue against it, but honestly most of the people who argue against it aren't qualified to make that argument. I am". In March 2018, Reigns said regarding his reception that "everyone wants to see you do good, but not too good"; and that there is "possible jealousy" from fans regarding his "major success". Before WrestleMania 34 in April 2018, Reigns said that he would not try to change for anyone that did not like him. Reigns' main event match with Lesnar at WrestleMania 34 was resoundingly rejected by the crowd, as Reigns was booed while the crowd played with beach balls and instead chanted "CM Punk", "Boring" and "This is awful!" Troy L. Smith of Cleveland.com concluded that this match was the worst ever WrestleMania main event due to the "utter disdain" it produced, with there never being a more "disinterested" crowd for a WrestleMania main event. Meltzer wrote that Reigns' loss was "done for sympathy for Reigns when it was over to make him a babyface as they concentrated on showing him all beaten up".

On April 30, the go-home edition of Raw before Backlash, Reigns was met with great hostility from the crowd in Montreal. Reigns was heavily booed, in contrast to his rival Samoa Joe, who received overwhelming cheers despite being portrayed as a heel. At Backlash, a large number of the crowd in New Jersey reportedly walked out of the arena during Reigns' match with Joe, a match Reigns was booked to win. Brian Campbell and Adam Silverstein of CBS Sports wrote that it was "just impossible to ignore how poorly WWE continues to treat its own fanbase ... this has escalated to the point where the psychology and storyline simply makes no sense in ways that can't be good for business". Meltzer described that "lots of people were leaving" during Reigns' match and that the crowd was chanting that the match was boring. Pro Wrestling Dot Net editor Jason Powell described WWE Chairman Vince McMahon as "completely insane when it comes to his obsession with Reigns being his company's top babyface" when the "definition of insanity is doing the same thing over and over and expecting different results". Powell went on to mock WWE's "frequently repeated line about how WWE listens to its fans" and another WWE claim that "any reaction is a good reaction". Meltzer said that the character of Reigns was being modeled after Daniel Bryan's, with the similar storyline that WWE "management is screwing him over and that's why he's not the champion", and that despite fans not buying this storyline, no one in WWE had a better idea for Reigns.

At Money in the Bank, Reigns' match with Jinder Mahal was widely rejected by the crowd in Illinois. Within the first two minutes of the match, once again, chants of "CM Punk" and "Boring" were heard. The crowd continued to ignore the match by playing with beach balls, performing the Mexican wave, and continued chants of other wrestlers names, booing officials who confiscated the beach balls, and continued negative chants about the match. Every single other match on the card, however, was comparatively well received. In July 2018 on Raw, Reigns told fans who "boo", "hate", or claim that he "is being crammed down our throats" to "learn to like it or close your mouth." Meanwhile, Wade Keller of Pro Wrestling Torch criticised Anoa'i for arguing that he deserves his push due to hard work and winning many titles. Keller pointed out that Anoa'i "doesn't work harder than dozens of other colleagues, yet he acts as if he's special", and that Reigns' title wins were "granted by Vince McMahon." At Extreme Rules, Reigns again received overwhelming boos while his opponent Bobby Lashley was wildly cheered. Lashley received wild cheers for his victory over Roman, as well as chants of "Thank you Lashley!"

=== Universal Champion and leukemia diagnosis (2018–2019) ===
In August 2018 at SummerSlam, the audience started out giving Reigns a fairly mixed reaction during his entrance. Following Braun Strowman's announcement of his plan to cash-in post match, the crowd cheered. A brief chant of "Let's go Roman/Roman Sucks" filled the arena at one point, followed by chants of "You both suck" directed at both Lesnar and Reigns. When Reigns pinned Lesnar to win the WWE Universal Championship, the crowd cheered. The following night on Raw, Reigns was again booed early in the show, but received a mixed reaction for suggesting that he defend his newly-won championship against Finn Bálor later that night. After beating Bálor, Reigns was again heavily booed by the crowd, which increased in intensity after the match when Braun Strowman attempted to cash in his Money in the Bank title shot. The subsequent Shield reunion and attack on Strowman was positively received by the Brooklyn audience, but was viewed by many as a cheap attempt to garner positive reactions for Reigns. At Hell in a Cell, Reigns defended his Universal Championship against Braun Strowman, during which Reigns was booed heavily while the villainous Strowman was wildly cheered by fans. The match was deeply mired in controversy, the first incident being when special guest referee Mick Foley counted Reigns down for a three count, but instead of Strowman getting the victory, the pinfall was simply ignored, and the second being when the match ended in a no-contest after interference from a returning Brock Lesnar. After the match ended, the network stream abruptly ended with many saying this was done to avoid broadcasting the heavy boos from fans with many taking to social media claiming that chants of "Bullshit!" and "We want refunds!" along with heavy booing broke out as Reigns, Strowman and Lesnar all had walked to the back.

"Everyone seemed relieved and elated that he delivered good news about his health."

— Wade Keller of the Pro Wrestling Torch describing the positive crowd reaction after Reigns had announced his leukemia was in remission.

On the October 22, 2018 episode of Raw, Reigns announced that he was re-diagnosed with leukemia after 11 years and would be taking a hiatus to treat it. As a result, he relinquished the Universal Championship, ending his reign of 64 days. Reigns initially received a mixed reaction upon entering the arena, but was welcomed with a positive reception as well as chants of "Thank you, Roman!" after his announcement of leukemia was made. Reigns made his return on the February 25, 2019 episode of Raw to announce his leukemia was in remission, where he received a huge ovation from the crowd. On the following episode of Raw, Reigns would reunite with The Shield, leading to a match between Drew McIntyre, Bobby Lashley and Baron Corbin at Fastlane, which The Shield would win in Reigns's first match since his leukemia diagnosis. Both times, Reigns would be met with cheers. At WrestleMania 35, Reigns defeated Drew McIntyre in his first singles match since October 2018. However, he would be met with a mixed reaction by the crowd, with Pro Wrestling Dot Net writer Jason Powell stating that an estimated "70 percent of the fans booed Reigns while only 30 percent cheered for him before the match." He would also describe the match as "disappointing".

Reigns was drafted to the SmackDown brand during the 2019 WWE Superstar Shake-up. On the April 16 episode of SmackDown. Reigns attacked Elias and Vince McMahon upon his arrival, with WWE's announcers describing Reigns as "SmackDown's greatest ever acquisition", as well as the future of SmackDown and WWE. Reigns' acquisition was met with positive reactions. Reigns participated in a six-man tag team match along with Ambrose and Rollins against Corbin, Lashley and McIntyre in the exclusive pay-per-view show, WWE The Shield's Final Chapter on April 21. The match, which The Shield won, was also billed as both the stable's final match and Ambrose's final match with WWE. Reigns was met with cheers during the match. During the following months, Reigns feuded with Shane McMahon, receiving lukewarm crowd reactions. Reigns lost some of the matches against Shane but managed to defeat McIntyre. This sparked criticism among journalists who claimed that if the company was trying to make Reigns the franchise player, losing it to McMahon (who is not a full-time wrestler) hurt his aura even more. Journalist Jason Powell mused that McIntyre seemed to be "just another guy they are feeding to Reigns rather than someone they have a real plan for."

=== Non-title feuds and hiatus (2019–2020) ===
After WrestleMania 35, Reigns was kept out of the title scene and involved in various other feuds. The most notable of these feuds were the ones with Daniel Bryan and Erick Rowan in the summer of 2019 and then one with Baron Corbin towards the end of 2019 and into 2020. In an interview with AOL.com in October 2019, Reigns stated he enjoyed not being in the title scene and working with wrestlers he might not have otherwise had a chance to work with. In the same interview, Reigns mentioned he appreciated the renewed crowd support in the wake of leukemia diagnosis (the revelation of which Reigns said was like "lifting a billion pounds of weight off my chest"), as well as stating just getting to be inside the ring was "like being in a title match". Reigns said: "Before it was always, 'I want to be on top and I need to stay at the top,' but for me, there was just something about this year where participation was like being in a title match. There's just been something very poetic about just being there, being healthy enough to be there, being able to participate and be present, bonding with my friends, creating for the live crowd."

After ending his feud with Corbin in February 2020, Reigns went back into the title picture to challenge Goldberg for the Universal Championship at WrestleMania 36. However, right after the COVID-19 pandemic started in mid-March 2020, Reigns pulled out of the match. There was speculation that it was due to Reigns having health concerns or having a falling out with WWE, but in an interview with The Hindu, Reigns explained it had nothing to do with personal health problems or any issues with WWE but rather the fact his wife was expecting twins. Reigns was off WWE programming for five months following the withdrawal.

=== Improvement in reception (2020–present) ===
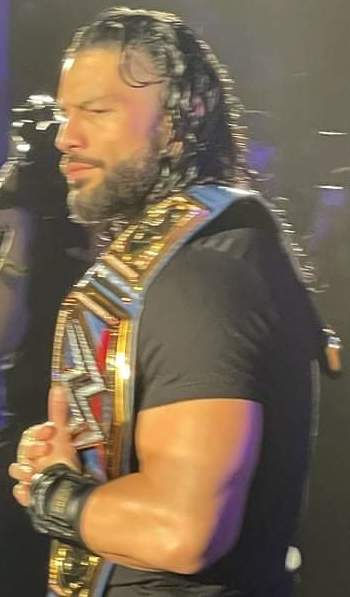
Reigns as WWE Universal Champion in 2022

On August 23, 2020, at SummerSlam, Reigns returned to WWE programming. Within a week, Reigns aligned himself with Paul Heyman, turning heel for the first time since 2014, and won the Universal title for a second time at Payback. He has since then branded himself as The Tribal Chief. The first part of this storyline saw him force Jey Uso (his real-life cousin) to eventually come to his side, in a months-long feud where Reigns beat Uso at every turn. Reigns' and Uso's work was praised by critics, which eventually led to Reigns adopting the catchphrase "Acknowledge me!"

Throughout 2020 and most of 2021, Reigns' heel championship run was praised by critics. In November 2020, John Bradshaw Layfield said on WWE's The Bump that Reigns was the most compelling character he has seen on wrestling television in twenty years. In May 2021, Cageside Seats called the Reigns story "heads, shoulders, knees and toes above anything else in WWE". At Money in the Bank, the first WWE pay-per-view since the WWE resumed touring after taking a break due to the pandemic, the crowd booed Reigns. He also was awarded with Wrestling Observer Newsletter's Best Gimmick award and Sports Illustrated's Wrestler of the Year award in 2021.

By the end of 2021, some critics began to complain that Reigns' new character had grown stale, with Sam Fels of Deadspin writing that "WWE has built no credible challengers for him". Fans also expressed annoyance that WWE relied on older, part-time wrestlers such as Edge, John Cena and Brock Lesnar to challenge Reigns for his universal title, while neglecting younger and full-time talent. Chris Rolling of Bleacher Report editorialized that although Reigns was "still an awesome character and heel", his championship reign had become "boring" and he was "overexposed" at the expense of other wrestlers. Brent Brookhouse of CBS Sports wrote that Reigns had "run out of steam" because WWE had "failed to build up compelling opponents".

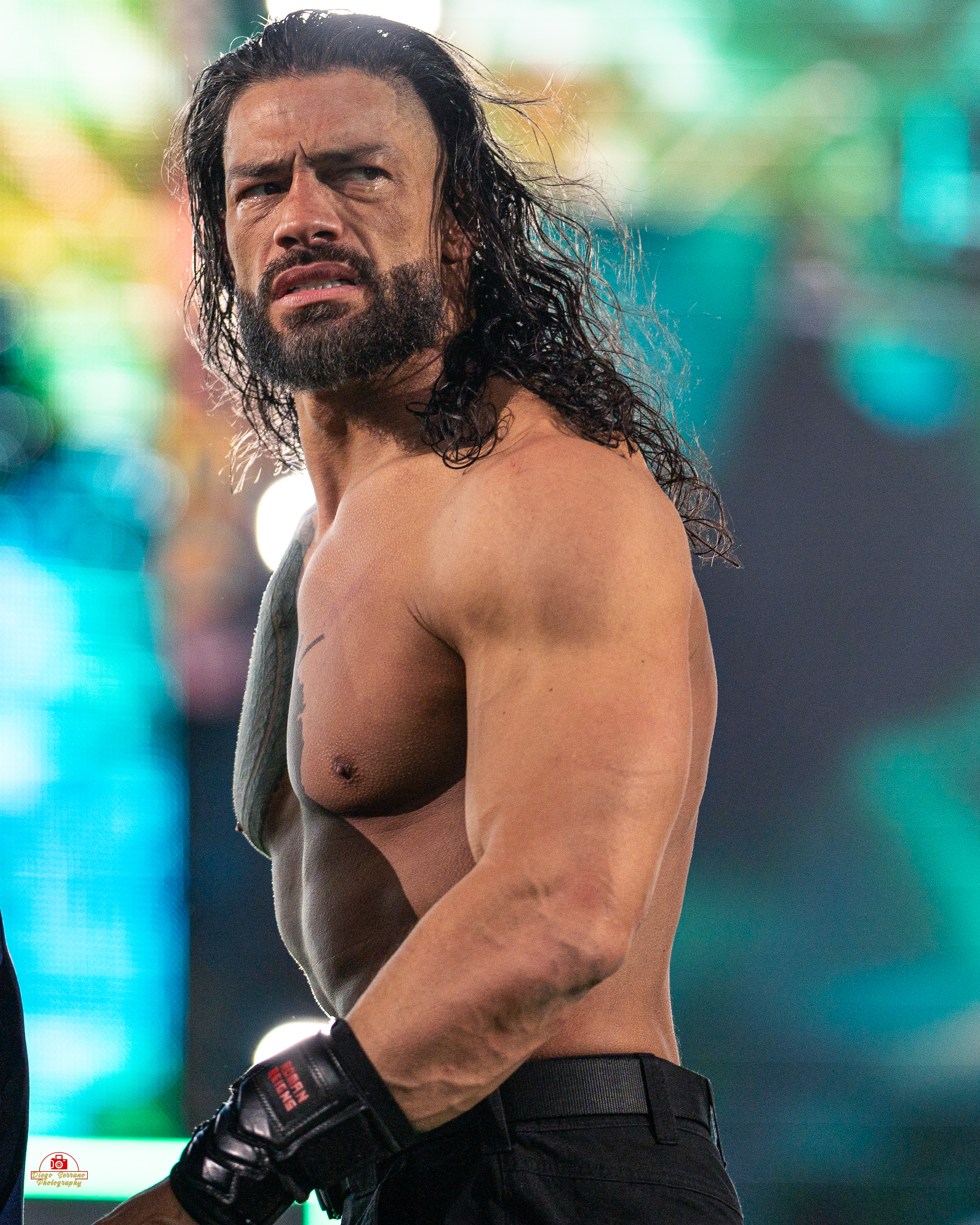
Reigns after losing the Undisputed WWE Universal Championship to Cody Rhodes at WrestleMania XL

Midway through 2022, Reigns' perception had improved once again, thanks in large part to critically praised storylines and matches with Lesnar, McIntyre, Logan Paul, Owens, and Cody Rhodes, and the storyline between The Bloodline and Sami Zayn. In particular, that storyline was highly praised, noticing the complexity, with Dave Scherer of PWInsider calling the storyline "some of the best wrestling ever, not just now. The whole story has been deep and nuanced".

On April 7, 2024 at Night 2 of WrestleMania 40, Roman Reigns would lose the Undisputed WWE Universal Championship to Cody Rhodes, ending the 1,316 day world title reign. After his title loss, Reigns' work as champion was highly praised by The Undertaker, calling it "arguably one of the greatest runs ever". After the title victory, Cody Rhodes stated "I hope that I can be half the champion that Roman Reigns was". Kenny Omega, who works for WWE's rival promotion All Elite Wrestling (AEW), also pointed out that he was a fan of Roman Reigns.

Following a four-month hiatus, Reigns returned at SummerSlam as a face, adopting the new moniker "The O.T.C." ("The Only Tribal Chief" or "The Original Tribal Chief"). On the following August 9, episode of SmackDown, Reigns received a massively positive crowd reaction as a face character, leading Sports Illustrated to remark that "WWE has finally made Roman Reigns the monster babyface they always believed he could be."

Reigns' polarizing rise to fame was referenced by CM Punk in a promo before their match at WrestleMania 42; he stated that Reigns had "so many chances and sucked at the first eight so bad that he should have been blackballed." At WrestleMania, he defeated Punk to win his first World Heavyweight Championship.
