= Royal Rumble (2014) =

WWE pay-per-view event

- Promotional poster featuring various WWE wrestlers
- Promotion: WWE
- Date: January 26, 2014
- City: Pittsburgh, Pennsylvania
- Venue: Consol Energy Center
- Attendance: 15,715
- Buy rate: 467,000

Pay-per-view chronology
| ← Previous; TLC: Tables, Ladders & Chairs | Next → Elimination Chamber |

Royal Rumble chronology
| ← Previous; 2013 | Next → 2015 |

The 2014 Royal Rumble was a professional wrestling pay-per-view (PPV) event produced by WWE. It was the 27th annual Royal Rumble event and took place on January 26, 2014, at the Consol Energy Center in Pittsburgh, Pennsylvania. It was the first Royal Rumble to be held in the city of Pittsburgh and the first WWE pay-per-view event held at the Consol Energy Center.

The event was based around the men's Royal Rumble match, a modified 30-man battle royal in which the participants enter at timed intervals instead of all beginning in the ring at the same time and the winner received a WWE World Heavyweight Championship match at WrestleMania XXX. This was the first Royal Rumble since 2002 where there was only one eligible championship for the winner to challenge for at that year's WrestleMania. This came as a result of the previous World Heavyweight Championship being unified with the WWE Championship at TLC: Tables, Ladders & Chairs the previous month; the World Heavyweight Championship was retired while the WWE Championship became the WWE World Heavyweight Championship.

The event featured five professional wrestling matches, including one match on the kickoff pre-show. The main event was the 2014 Royal Rumble match, which a returning Batista won by last eliminating Roman Reigns to become a two-time winner, after 2005, and the fifth multi-time winner, after Hulk Hogan, Shawn Michaels, "Stone Cold" Steve Austin, and John Cena. Other matches saw Randy Orton successfully defending the WWE World Heavyweight Championship against John Cena, Bray Wyatt defeating Daniel Bryan, and Brock Lesnar defeating Big Show. On the kickoff pre-show, Goldust and Cody Rhodes lost the WWE Tag Team Championship to the New Age Outlaws (Road Dogg and Billy Gunn).

Considered one of the worst Royal Rumble pay-per-views of all time, the event is notable for the overwhelmingly negative audience response to the Orton–Cena and Royal Rumble matches. The fans booed Royal Rumble winner Batista in protest and chanted for Daniel Bryan (who was not part of the match) and runner-up Roman Reigns, though the Bryan–Wyatt match was praised. The event marked the final WWE appearance of CM Punk, who abruptly left the company on bad terms the following day and retired from wrestling for the next seven-and-a-half years; he then joined All Elite Wrestling in August 2021, but after controversial issues that led to him being fired from AEW in August 2023, he returned to WWE at Survivor Series: WarGames in November that year, and competed in his first televised WWE match in a decade at the 2024 Royal Rumble.

The event received 467,000 pay-per-view buys, down 8.8% from the 512,000 buys for the previous year's event. This was the final Royal Rumble event to air exclusively via traditional PPV outlets due to the launch of the WWE Network streaming service after the Elimination Chamber event the following month.

== Production ==
=== Background ===
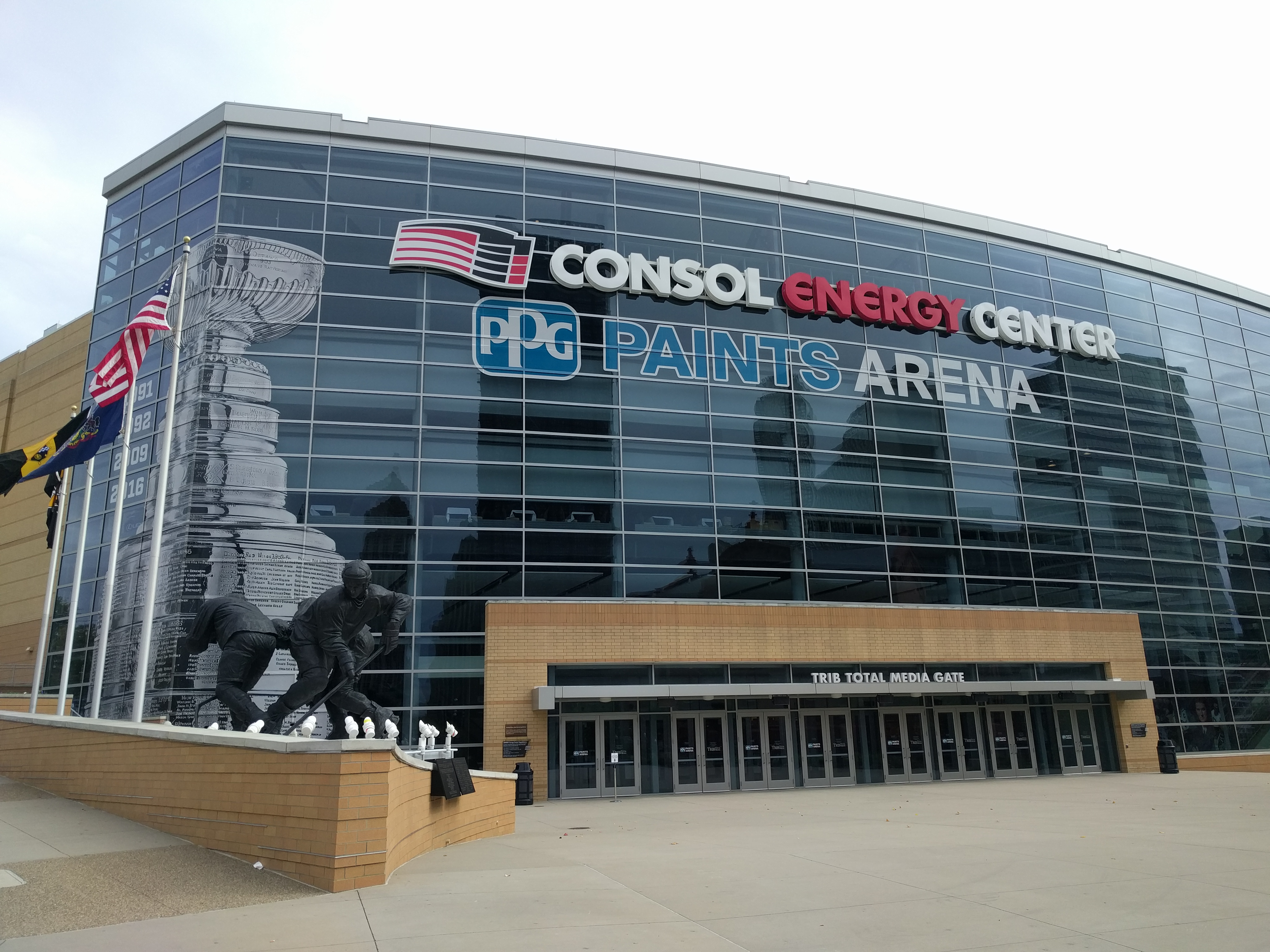
The 27th annual Royal Rumble event was held at the Consol Energy Center in Pittsburgh, Pennsylvania.

The Royal Rumble is an annual professional wrestling event, produced every January by WWE since 1988; that first event was a television special before it became a pay-per-view (PPV) event beginning in 1989. It is one of the promotion's original four pay-per-views, along with WrestleMania, SummerSlam, and Survivor Series, referred to as the "Big Four". It is named after and centered on the men's Royal Rumble match.

The 27th Royal Rumble event was scheduled to be held on January 26, 2014, at the Consol Energy Center in Pittsburgh, Pennsylvania. The venue opened in August 2010, replacing the former Mellon Arena, which made this the first WWE pay-per-view event held in this venue, although the arena was originally going to host the 2012 Survivor Series. On the final episode of Raw before the Royal Rumble event, Batista returned to WWE after an absence of nearly four years, and the Royal Rumble match was scheduled to be his first return match.

The Royal Rumble match is a modified battle royal in which the participants enter at timed intervals instead of all beginning in the ring at the same time, and the match generally features 30 wrestlers. Since 1993, the winner earns a world championship match at that year's WrestleMania. Since 2003, there had been two eligible championships for the winner to challenge for at WrestleMania, but for 2014, there was only one eligible championship to challenge for at WrestleMania XXX, which was the WWE World Heavyweight Championship. This made this the first Royal Rumble since the 2002 event to only feature one world championship. This came as a result of the previous World Heavyweight Championship being unified with the WWE Championship at TLC: Tables, Ladders & Chairs the previous month; the World Heavyweight Championship was retired while the WWE Championship became the WWE World Heavyweight Championship.

=== Storylines ===
The event comprised five matches, including one on the Kickoff pre-show, that resulted from scripted storylines. Results were predetermined by WWE's writers, while storylines were produced on WWE's weekly television shows, Raw and SmackDown.

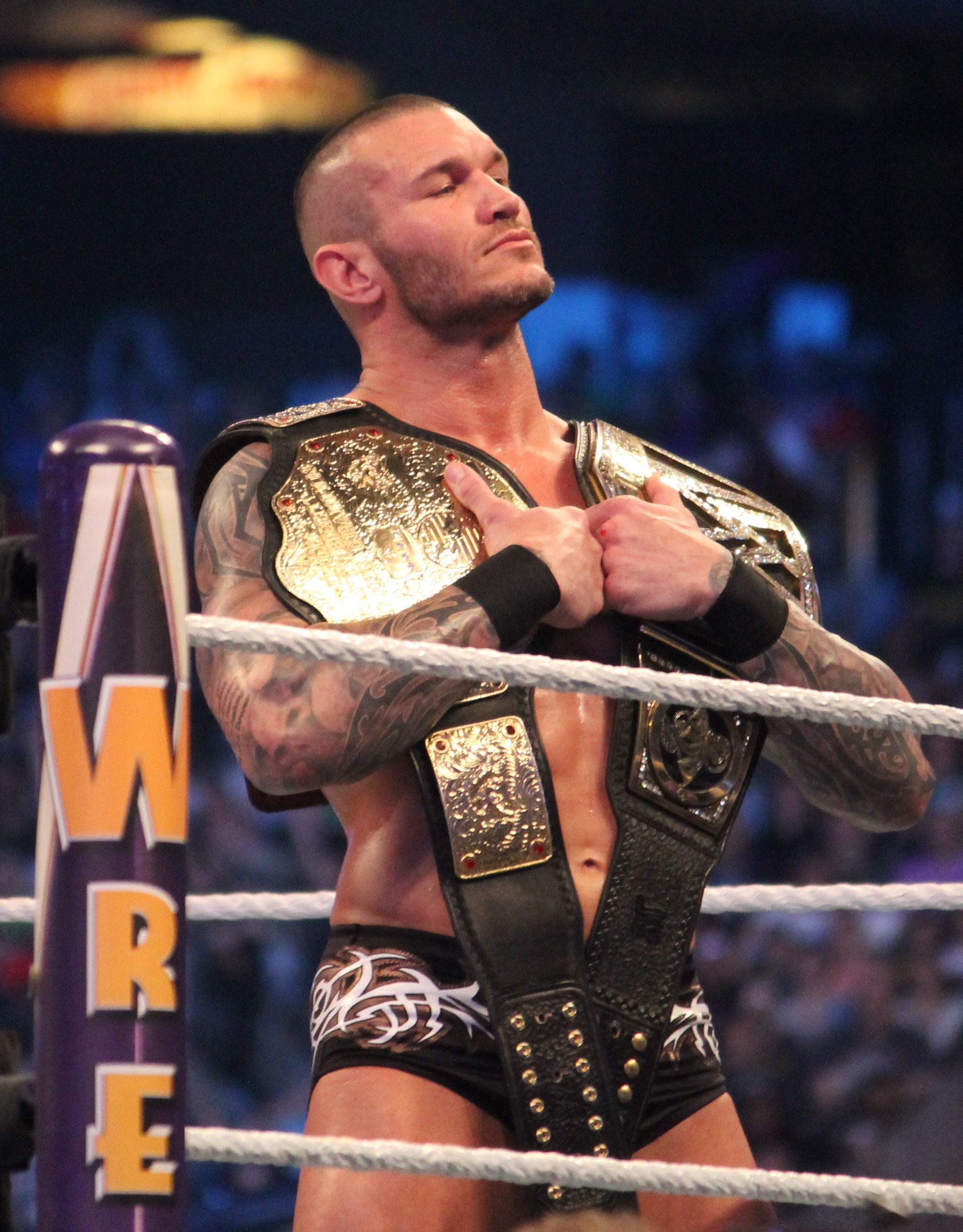
Randy Orton was the defending WWE World Heavyweight Champion heading into Royal Rumble

A highly promoted match featured WWE World Heavyweight Champion Randy Orton defending the title against long-time adversary John Cena. At Survivor Series in November 2013, Orton successfully defended his WWE Championship against Big Show, on the same night that World Heavyweight Champion John Cena defeated Alberto Del Rio to retain his title. After Orton's victory at Survivor Series, Cena came down to the ring with his title, and celebrated with the crowd as The Authority (Triple H, Stephanie McMahon, and Kane) looked on, much to Orton's chagrin. The next month, at the TLC pay-per-view, Orton defeated Cena in a Tables, Ladders, and Chairs match to unify the two titles as the WWE World Heavyweight Championship. On the December 30 episode of Raw, Cena was awarded a rematch for the title against Orton at the Royal Rumble, with the match stipulation of a traditional one-on-one singles match, except that it could only be won by pinfall or submission. On the January 13, 2014, episode, Orton suffered an upset loss to Kofi Kingston and took out his frustrations by attacking Cena's father, who was attending the event at ringside.

On the December 30, 2013, episode of Raw, Brock Lesnar returned with his manager, Paul Heyman, to announce his intentions to challenge the winner of the upcoming WWE World Heavyweight Championship match between Randy Orton and John Cena at the Royal Rumble. Lesnar then dared any wrestler who disapproved of that notion to challenge him, which was answered by Mark Henry, and a brawl would ensue, ending with Lesnar delivering an F-5 to Henry. The following week on Raw, Henry challenged Lesnar again, only to have Lesnar dislocate his elbow with the Kimura lock in storyline, which led Big Show to come out afterwards to confront Lesnar. On the January 10 episode of SmackDown, Big Show issued a challenge to Lesnar, Paul Heyman accepting on behalf of Lesnar and scheduling the match for the Royal Rumble event.

Announced on WWE.com, Goldust and Cody Rhodes faced The New Age Outlaws (Road Dogg and Billy Gunn) for the WWE Tag Team Championship on the Royal Rumble Kickoff Show preceding the pay-per-view. This match was made when The New Age Outlaws defeated Cody Rhodes and Goldust in a non-title match on the January 17 episode of SmackDown due to a distraction from Vickie Guerrero.

On the October 28, 2013, episode of Raw, The Wyatt Family (Bray Wyatt, Luke Harper, and Erick Rowan) attacked Daniel Bryan backstage, which ignited a feud between the two. The next month at Survivor Series, Bryan teamed with CM Punk and defeated Harper and Rowan. The rivalry between Bryan and the Wyatt Family continued in December, as the latter defeated the former in a 3-on-1 handicap match at TLC, with Wyatt attempting to recruit Bryan in the previous weeks. On the December 30, 2013, episode of Raw, Bryan defeated Harper and then Rowan in a gauntlet match so that he could face Wyatt, whereupon Harper and Rowan interfered for a disqualification and beat him down, before announcing he would join the Wyatt Family. However, on the January 13, 2014, episode of Raw (after Bryan and Bray Wyatt were defeated by Jey Uso and Jimmy Uso in a Steel Cage match), Bryan betrayed Wyatt and attacked him, culminating with Bryan hitting his flying knee finishing maneuver on Wyatt. The following week on Raw, Bryan explained that his joining the Wyatts was a ruse to infiltrate the stable and bide his time to strike, and that he would wrestle Wyatt at the Royal Rumble event.

== Event ==
Other on-screen personnel
| Role: | Name: |
|---|---|
| English commentators | Michael Cole |
| English commentators | Jerry Lawler |
| English commentators | John "Bradshaw" Layfield |
| Spanish commentators | Carlos Cabrera |
| Spanish commentators | Marcelo Rodriguez |
| Spanish commentators | Ricardo Rodriguez |
| Interviewer | Renee Young |
| Ring announcers | Lilian Garcia |
| Ring announcers | Justin Roberts |
| Referees | Charles Robinson |
| Referees | John Cone |
| Referees | Mike Chioda |
| Referees | Jason Ayers (Pre-show) |
| Referees | Rod Zapata (Rumble match) |
| Pre-show panel | Josh Mathews |
| Pre-show panel | Ric Flair |
| Pre-show panel | Shawn Michaels |
| Pre-show panel | Jim Duggan |

=== Pre-show ===
Before the show aired live on pay-per-view, the Royal Rumble Kickoff pre-show was shown live on YouTube and other digital platforms. Backstage, the general managers of Raw and SmackDown, Brad Maddox and Vickie Guerrero, respectively, rolled the "Rumble Drum" to give wrestlers their numbers. Alberto Del Rio, R-Truth, The Real Americans (Jack Swagger and Antonio Cesaro), Kofi Kingston, The Great Khali, and Damien Sandow picked their numbers during the segment.

In the pre-show, Goldust and Cody Rhodes defended the WWE Tag Team Championship against The New Age Outlaws (Road Dogg and Billy Gunn). Towards the end of the match, Rhodes applied a dropkick to Dogg, but was unaware that Gunn blind-tagged in for the latter. From the back, Gunn entered the ring and delivered a Fame-Ass-er to Rhodes, to win the match and the titles for the Outlaws.

=== Preliminary matches ===
In the first match on the pay-per-view portion of the show, Bray Wyatt faced Daniel Bryan. Early in the match, the referee saw Bray's Wyatt Family members Luke Harper and Erick Rowan attempting to interfere, so he ejected them from ringside. During the match, Wyatt targeted Bryan's head, ramming it into the ring-post. Bryan later mounted a comeback with a running tornado DDT off the ring apron, planting Wyatt's head on the floor. Wyatt managed to escape Bryan's Yes! Lock submission hold by biting Bryan's hand. To avoid Bryan's running knee, Wyatt rolled out of the ring to the floor. Bryan then attempted a suicide dive but Wyatt caught him and executed a Sister Abigail into the barricade. After another Sister Abigail in the ring, Wyatt scored the pinfall victory.

In the next match, Brock Lesnar (accompanied by Paul Heyman) faced Big Show. Lesnar attacked Big Show before the match started, and then hit him with a chair. When the match started, Big Show landed his KO Punch, but Lesnar picked up the victory after executing an F-5. Lesnar then continued to attack Big Show with a chair after the match.

In the penultimate match, Randy Orton defended the WWE World Heavyweight Championship against John Cena. After both wrestlers failed to win despite executing their RKO, Attitude Adjustment, and STF moves, both wrestlers resorted to using their opponent's signature moves but still could not win the match. At the end of the match, Cena again trapped Orton in the STF submission hold, but the lights temporarily went out due to the arrival of The Wyatt Family on the ring apron. Orton took advantage of the distraction to drop Cena with the RKO to pin him and win the match.

=== Main event ===
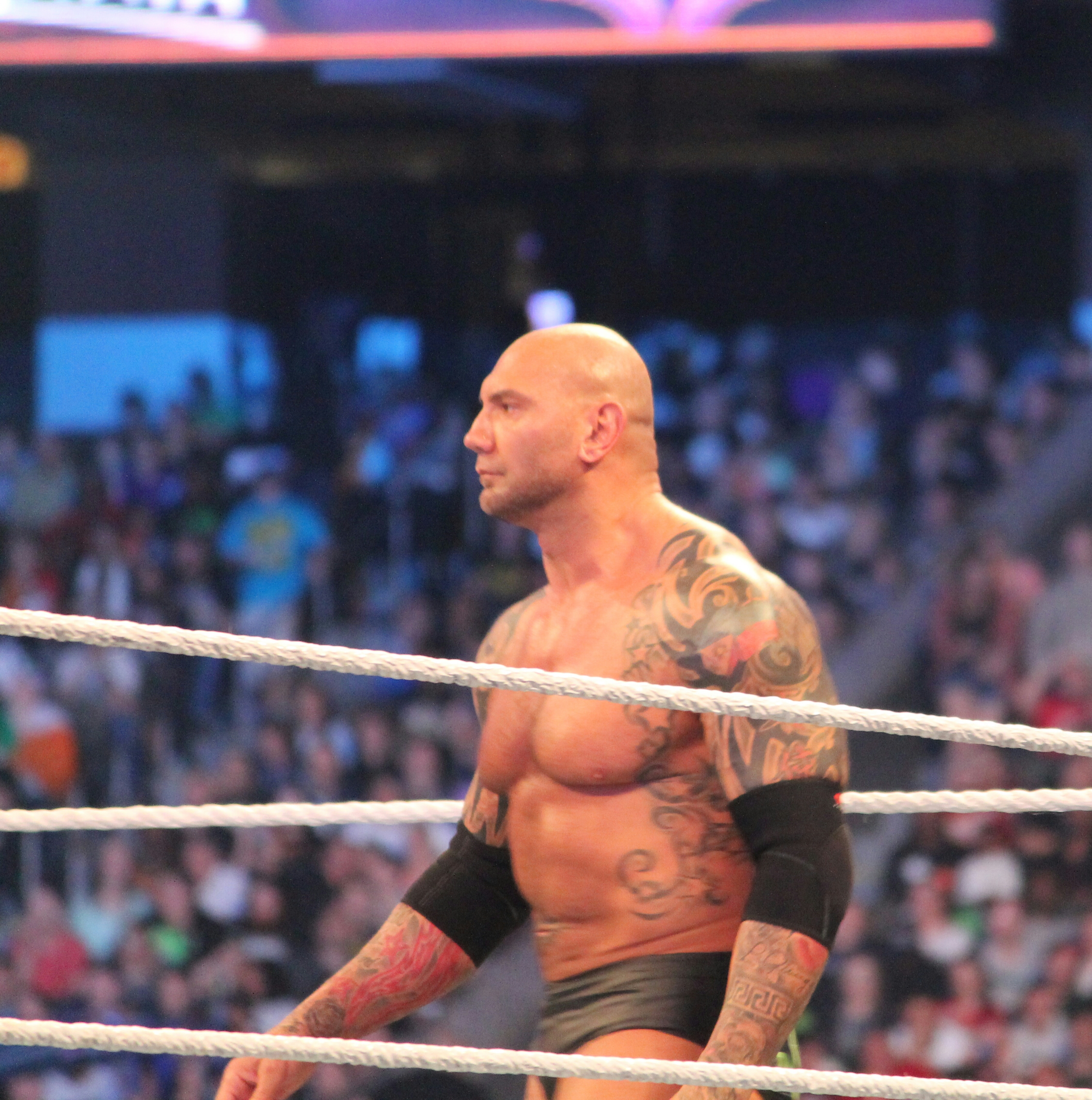
Batista won the 2014 Royal Rumble match, which was his second Royal Rumble win, after 2005. This also made him the fifth multi-time winner, after Hulk Hogan, Shawn Michaels, "Stone Cold" Steve Austin, and John Cena.

The main event was the Royal Rumble match for a WWE World Heavyweight Championship match at WrestleMania XXX. CM Punk and Seth Rollins were entrants #1 and #2; they spent the longest and second longest time in the entire match (49 and 48 minutes respectively). Kane entered at #5 and targeted Punk, but Punk managed to eliminate him. NXT's Alexander Rusev entered at #6. Kofi Kingston, who entered at #8, had two feats of athleticism to escape elimination; first after he was deposited on the guardrail by Rusev (who caught him when Kingston was thrown out of the ring) he jumped back to the ring apron from the guardrail, and later while he was hanging on to the bottom rope with his feet, he fended off Jack Swagger by snatching Swagger's boot and hitting him with it.

Rollins' Shield teammates (Dean Ambrose and Roman Reigns) entered at #11 and #15 respectively. Goldust eliminated his brother Cody Rhodes 24 minutes into the match, and was in turn eliminated by Reigns, who had also eliminated Kingston and unannounced entrant Kevin Nash, amongst others. Midway through the match with only Punk and the Shield left in the ring, Sheamus returned to WWE television at #17 and momentarily stopped the Shield's dominance. Los Matadores' mascot El Torito entered at #20, and managed to eliminate Fandango, before being eliminated in turn by Reigns. Pay-per-view commentator John "Bradshaw" Layfield was announced as entrant #24, making it the first time the JBL character had participated in a Royal Rumble. He was eliminated by Reigns while handing his jacket to fellow commentator Michael Cole, whereupon he resumed his commentator role for the rest of the match.

Batista entered at #28 and quickly eliminated Erick Rowan, Ryback, and Alberto Del Rio. The final entrant at #30 was Rey Mysterio, who was eliminated by Rollins. When Ambrose tried to eliminate Reigns, Reigns retaliated by eliminating Ambrose, Rollins and Antonio Cesaro simultaneously, leaving himself, Punk, Sheamus and Batista as the final four. Though already eliminated, Kane returned to ringside and pulled Punk over the top rope to eliminate him, then executed a chokeslam through a broadcast table on Punk. Reigns eliminated Sheamus to set a new record for most eliminations in a Rumble match with 12, but Reigns was then thrown over the top rope by Batista, who won the match. This was his second Royal Rumble win, after 2005, and also made him the fifth multi-time winner, after Hulk Hogan, Shawn Michaels, "Stone Cold" Steve Austin, and John Cena.

== Reception ==
The event sold out the Consol Energy Center with 15,715 people in attendance. The official buy total for the 2014 Royal Rumble event was 467,000, which was a decrease of 8.8% from the 512,000 of the previous year's event, but a 5.4% increase from the 443,000 of the 2012 event. This contributed to WWE's PPV revenue of $13.8 million for the first quarter of 2014 compared with $15.1 million for the first quarter of 2013. The 2015 Royal Rumble event received 145,000 purchases, a significant drop from the 2014 event, due to the fact that the latter was held prior to the launch of the WWE Network.

The negative reaction of the fans attending the event in Pittsburgh was so great that it was reported as one of the major news items coming out of the show, and described as the live audience engineering a "takeover" of the final two hours of the show. During the title match between John Cena and Randy Orton, fans booed both men and chanted for Daniel Bryan, amongst other chants such as "this is awful". The fans continued to chant for Bryan during the Royal Rumble match and so when Rey Mysterio (typically a fan favorite) was revealed as the final entrant (and therefore Bryan's possible participation in the match was ruled out) the fans booed Mysterio, chanted for Bryan and cheered Mysterio's eventual elimination. The crowd continued to boo when there were three wrestlers left in the match, but when only Batista and Roman Reigns remained, they cheered for Reigns (a villainous character at the time) over Batista and later booed Batista's victory as the event drew to a close. After the show went off the air, Batista (who had been presented on-air as a heroic babyface character) mocked Bryan and gestured his middle finger at the crowd. Aaron Oster of The Baltimore Sun wrote Mysterio "received more boos than he's ever had in his WWE career", and in the case of Batista, "besides the fact that a supposed face was getting booed, the boos were stronger than any Rumble winner I can remember, including when Mr. McMahon won in 1999".

Fans took to social media to display their displeasure towards the event. The BBC reported that regarding Bryan's exclusion from the Rumble match, "many people have also expressed anger on social media, with the phrases #RoyalRumble, #WWE and Daniel Bryan all trending on Twitter". The Herald & Review described the reaction to the event as "WWE's PR nightmare", with the most "liked" comments on WWE's Facebook page within 24 hours of the event including "worst PPV ever", "the sound of WWE dropping the ball" and in reference to the WWE Network, "no Bryan, no buy". Retired wrestler Mick Foley criticized WWE management on social media, stating, "Does WWE actually hate their own audience? I've never been so disgusted with a PPV".

Dale Plummer and Nick Tylwalk of Canoe.ca rated the overall event as 6.0 out of 10. The Wyatt-Bryan bout was rated the highest at a "fantastic" 9.5 out of 10, the Cena-Orton bout, described as a "sloppy affair that won’t go down among the best work from either man" received 4.0 out of 10, while the Lesnar-Big Show encounter received 1.0 out of 10. They described the event as "uneven", and that "the disapproval of the fans at the Consol Energy Center at how the Royal Rumble match went down will be the lasting memory for anyone who watched the show".

James Caldwell of the Pro Wrestling Torch Newsletter rated the Royal Rumble match 2.5 stars out of 5, commenting that "well, that back-fired". He wrote that the "Rumble peaked about three-fourths through, then fell off the table at the end", and described the Rumble winner Batista as "out-of-shape". Caldwell also rated the Bryan-Wyatt match 4.0 stars out of 5, describing it as "easily Bray's best WWE TV match, great chemistry from both wrestlers" in front of a "hot, invested crowd". Caldwell chose not to rate the Lesnar-Show match, commenting that it was necessarily short due to Show being injured going into the match. Lastly, Caldwell rated the Orton-Cena title match 2.0 stars out of 5.

Benjamin Tucker, who attended the event and is also from the Pro Wrestling Torch Newsletter, rated the entire event 6.0 out of 10, saying "the show began great but slowly lost steam before ending in a roar of jeers". For the Rumble match, Tucker said that "the first two-thirds especially were exciting, with several wrestlers being spotlighted well", "until lower-level players kept coming out in the final half of the match". Tucker felt that "Roman Reigns was the star of the match, even outclassing Batista. Where Batista stumbled around the ring like... well, an old, retired wrestler, Roman Reigns looked like an absolute monster". For the opening match, Tucker felt that the "deliberate pace didn't hurt the match in the slightest. Instead, it allowed Bray to keep using his character while in a competitive, big match situation". For the rest of the matches, Tucker wrote that "Lesnar looked like a relentless beast", while "Orton and Cena put on their most lifeless performance ever together. There was very little story to the match" and "no creativity at all".

The following year's Royal Rumble was similarly marked by an extreme negative audience reaction towards the Rumble match and its winner, which some media outlets described as being even worse than the 2014 event.

== Aftermath ==
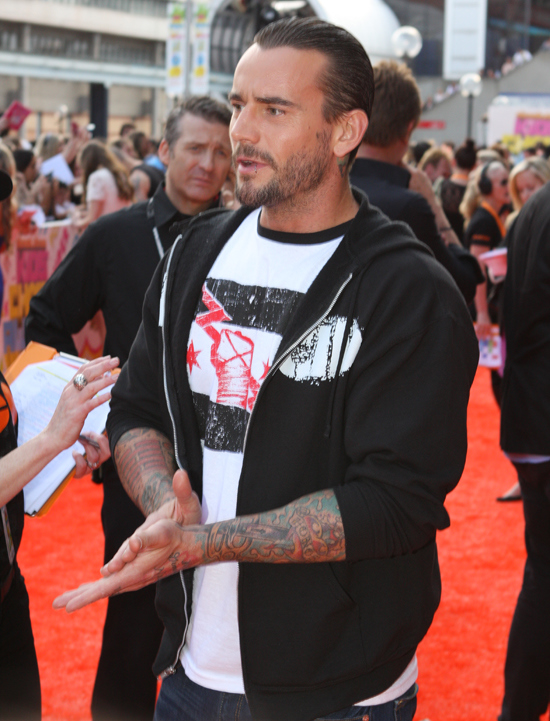
CM Punk did not appear at any WWE event after the Royal Rumble until November 2023.

After the Royal Rumble event, CM Punk did not appear and was not mentioned on Raw the next day. Despite being advertised for the SmackDown taping on Tuesday, he also did not appear in front of the live audience. By Wednesday, WWE.com stopped advertising Punk for future events. It was reported by the Wrestling Observer that on Monday prior to Raw, Punk had legitimately walked out on WWE when he informed Vince McMahon that he was "going home". On February 20, McMahon indicated to investors that Punk was "taking a sabbatical". However, in an interview published in late May, Punk indicated that he had retired; he was questioned "How does it feel to be retired at 35?" and replied with "It feels good." Punk's WWE contract subsequently expired in July 2014, thus making the Royal Rumble his final on-screen appearance for nearly 10 years.

However, on an episode of Colt Cabana's Art of Wrestling podcast released in November 2014, Punk said that he was suspended for two months after walking out on the company in January and that after the suspension ended, nobody from WWE contacted him. Punk also told that when he reached out to them for unpaid royalties, he was given a run-around by company executives until he was handed his termination papers and was fired by WWE on his wedding day with April Mendez (better known as AJ Lee) in June 2014. The manner of firing was the last straw for Punk, stating that he would never return to WWE and that following a legal settlement with WWE there would be no further working relationship between them. The settlement included Punk giving WWE permission to sell his remaining merchandise. Punk subsequently signed a contract to compete in the UFC in 2015. Punk had not appeared on WWE programming since then, though he did have multiple appearances on WWE Backstage, a show broadcast by Fox Sports, who had a television deal with WWE. However, on August 20, 2021, Punk returned to professional wrestling when he signed with All Elite Wrestling (AEW) during The First Dance edition of its weekly program Rampage. After Punk left AEW in August 2023, he returned to WWE that November at Survivor Series: WarGames.

The post-Rumble Raw on January 27 began with Triple H and Stephanie McMahon (The Authority) addressing the Rumble event and mocking the audience for not getting what they wanted. When Daniel Bryan came out and confronted them about not being inserted into the Rumble match, and then demanded to be inserted into the Elimination Chamber match and refused to leave the ring until they did, he was attacked by the Shield (Roman Reigns, Seth Rollins, and Dean Ambrose), but was then saved by John Cena and Sheamus. As a result, Bryan, Cena, and Sheamus later teamed together to take on the Shield in a six-man tag team match in which all three members of the winning team qualified to participate in the Elimination Chamber match (in which Randy Orton would defend his WWE World Heavyweight Championship) at the eponymous pay-per-view. During that match, The Wyatt Family (Bray Wyatt, Luke Harper, and Erick Rowan) interfered, causing the Shield to be disqualified and thus Bryan, Cena, and Sheamus qualified for the Chamber match. Cesaro and a returning Christian also qualified for the Chamber match by defeating Dolph Ziggler and Jack Swagger respectively. For costing them the spots in the Chamber match, the Shield vowed revenge against the Wyatt Family, which set up a match between the groups at the Elimination Chamber pay-per-view.

At Elimination Chamber, Randy Orton retained his WWE World Heavyweight Championship by winning the Elimination Chamber match against Daniel Bryan, John Cena, Cesaro, Christian and Sheamus. During the Elimination Chamber match, the Wyatt Family once again interfered to cause Cena's elimination from the match. Also at Elimination Chamber, Batista defeated Alberto Del Rio, with the negative audience reaction to Batista continuing, even prompting the audience to cheer Del Rio. Meanwhile, Bray Wyatt was victorious once again with the Wyatt Family defeating the Shield.

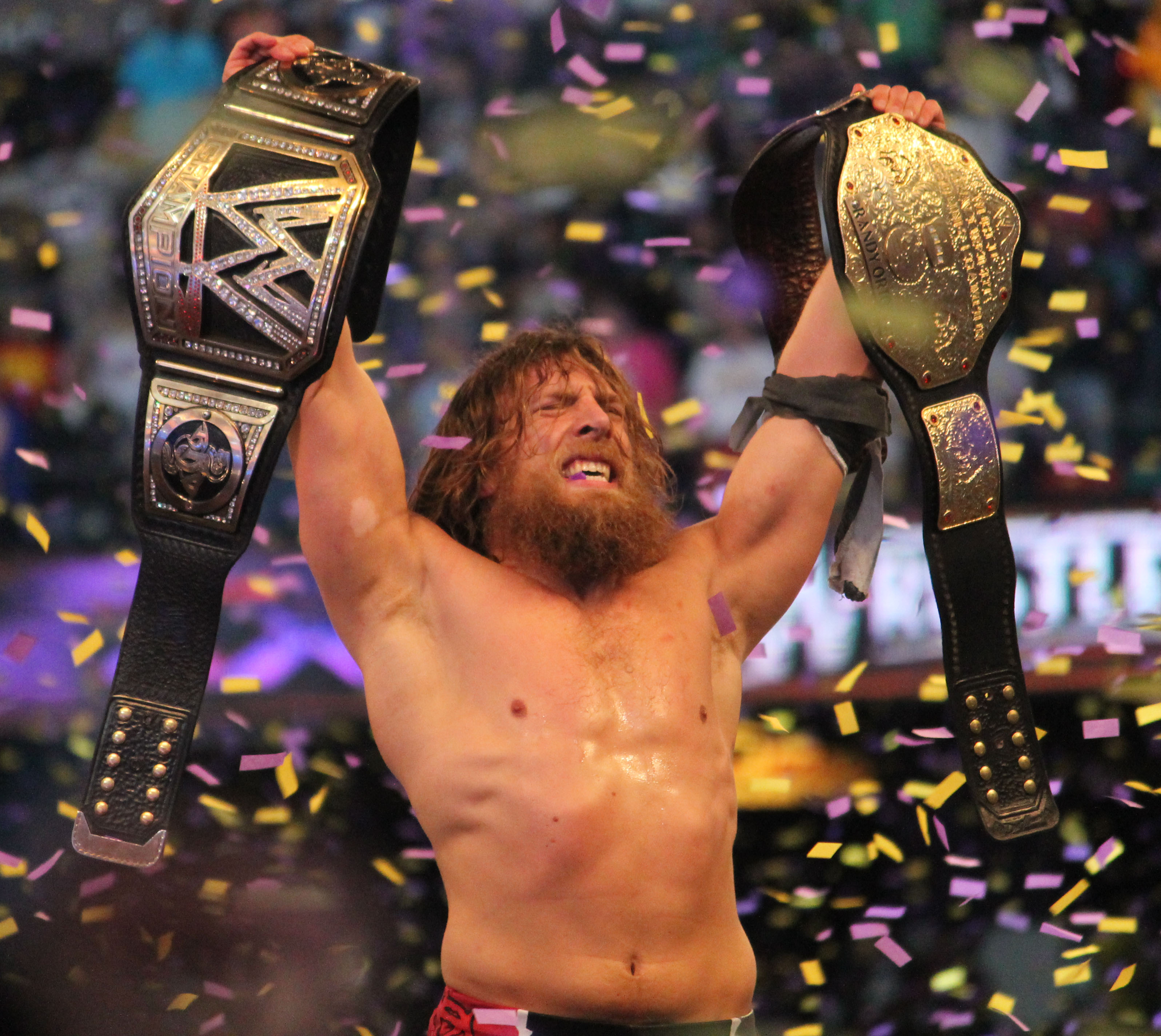
Daniel Bryan closed WrestleMania XXX by celebrating his win of the WWE World Heavyweight Championship.

Because of the boisterous negative reaction, Batista responded to the audience on the February 28 episode of SmackDown, saying he did not come back to be liked, only to be the next WWE World Heavyweight Champion; he then criticized and mocked the audience for supporting "195 lb wannabes" over him and vowed to destroy each and everyone of the fans' "heroes" on the road to WrestleMania, thus turning into a villain in the process.

The scheduled WrestleMania XXX main event was Orton versus Batista for the WWE World Heavyweight Championship. However, on the March 10 episode of Raw, Bryan and multiple fans "occupied" the ring and refused to leave, resulting in an irate Triple H agreeing to Bryan's demand for a match at WrestleMania, with the stipulation that the winner would be inserted into the WWE World Heavyweight Championship match at the event. At WrestleMania, Bryan was added to the match after defeating Triple H in the opening contest of the show, and would ultimately win the triple threat match, forcing Batista to submit and win the WWE World Heavyweight Championship. On May 12, Daniel Bryan announced that due to injuries, he would require neck surgery, which he underwent on May 15. Bryan was stripped of the WWE World Heavyweight Championship by the Authority on June 9 as he was not healthy enough to defend his championship.

Cody Rhodes and Goldust failed to regain the WWE Tag Team Championship from The New Age Outlaws on the post-Rumble Raw, as the match ended in no contest after Brock Lesnar attacked Rhodes and Goldust. The following week, they received another rematch for the titles in a steel cage match, which the Outlaws won. The Outlaws' reign ended on the March 3 episode of Raw, when The Usos won the Tag Team Championship.

Following Elimination Chamber, Wyatt feuded with Cena, with Wyatt wanting to prove that Cena's heroic act was a facade characteristic of "this era of lies" while also trying to turn Cena into a "monster". Wyatt went on to accept Cena's challenge for a match at WrestleMania XXX, which Cena won despite interference from Luke Harper and Erick Rowan. In May at Extreme Rules, Wyatt defeated Cena in a steel cage match, after repeated interference from the rest of The Wyatt Family and a "demonic" child. Their feud ended at Payback on June 1, where, in a Last Man Standing match, Cena buried Wyatt under multiple equipment cases to win the match. Cena won the vacated WWE World Heavyweight Championship at Money in the Bank on June 29.

On the February 24 episode of Raw, Brock Lesnar and his manager Paul Heyman voiced their complaints about Lesnar not being in the WWE World Heavyweight Championship match at WrestleMania. Instead, the Authority offered Lesnar a contract to face anyone else at WrestleMania. They were interrupted by a returning Undertaker, who confronted Lesnar. While Lesnar signed the contract for a match at WrestleMania with The Undertaker as his opponent, The Undertaker accepted Lesnar's challenge by stabbing Lesnar with a pen and chokeslamming him through a table. This set up a match where Lesnar would attempt to break The Undertaker's 21–0 undefeated streak at WrestleMania. Lesnar defeated The Undertaker after executing three F5s, thus ending the streak. In August 2014, Lesnar defeated John Cena at SummerSlam, capturing the WWE World Heavyweight Championship in the process.

This was the last Royal Rumble to air exclusively via traditional PPV outlets due to the launch of the WWE Network streaming service in February.

== Results ==
| No. | Results | Stipulations | Times |
|---|---|---|---|
| 1^{P} | New Age Outlaws (Billy Gunn and Road Dogg) defeated Cody Rhodes and Goldust (c) by pinfall | Tag team match for the WWE Tag Team Championship | 6:58 |
| 2 | Bray Wyatt (with Luke Harper and Erick Rowan) defeated Daniel Bryan by pinfall | Singles match | 21:35 |
| 3 | Brock Lesnar (with Paul Heyman) defeated Big Show by pinfall | Singles match | 2:02 |
| 4 | Randy Orton (c) defeated John Cena by pinfall | Singles match for the WWE World Heavyweight Championship | 20:54 |
| 5 | Batista won by last eliminating Roman Reigns | 30-man Royal Rumble match for a WWE World Heavyweight Championship match at WrestleMania XXX | 55:08 |
(c) / – the champion(s) heading into the match; P / – the match was broadcast on the pre-show

=== Royal Rumble 2014 entrances and eliminations ===
– NXT
– Winner

| Draw | Entrant | Order | Eliminated by | Time | Eliminations |
|---|---|---|---|---|---|
| 1 | CM Punk | 27 | Kane | 49:13 | 3 |
| 2 | Seth Rollins | 25 | Roman Reigns | 48:31 | 3 |
| 3 | Damien Sandow | 1 | CM Punk | 02:17 | 0 |
| 4 | Cody Rhodes | 11 | Goldust | 21:01 | 1 |
| 5 | Kane | 2 | CM Punk | 01:10 | 1 |
| 6 | Alexander Rusev | 3 | CM Punk, Cody Rhodes, Kofi Kingston, and Seth Rollins | 07:06 | 0 |
| 7 | Jack Swagger | 6 | Kevin Nash | 12:24 | 0 |
| 8 | Kofi Kingston | 7 | Roman Reigns | 12:42 | 1 |
| 9 | Jimmy Uso | 5 | Dean Ambrose | 07:53 | 0 |
| 10 | Goldust | 12 | Roman Reigns | 12:00 | 1 |
| 11 | Dean Ambrose | 26 | Roman Reigns | 33:56 | 3 |
| 12 | Dolph Ziggler | 8 | Roman Reigns | 06:09 | 0 |
| 13 | R-Truth | 4 | Dean Ambrose | 00:36 | 0 |
| 14 | Kevin Nash | 9 | Roman Reigns | 00:36 | 1 |
| 15 | Roman Reigns | 29 | Batista | 33:58 | 12 |
| 16 | The Great Khali | 10 | The Shield (Roman, Rollins, Ambrose) | 00:53 | 0 |
| 17 | Sheamus | 28 | Roman Reigns | 28:22 | 1 |
| 18 | The Miz | 16 | Luke Harper | 12:09 | 0 |
| 19 | Fandango | 13 | El Torito | 03:02 | 0 |
| 20 | El Torito | 14 | Roman Reigns | 01:49 | 1 |
| 21 | Antonio Cesaro | 24 | Roman Reigns | 17:16 | 0 |
| 22 | Luke Harper | 23 | Roman Reigns | 15:21 | 2 |
| 23 | Jey Uso | 17 | Luke Harper | 04:32 | 0 |
| 24 | John "Bradshaw" Layfield | 15 | Roman Reigns | 00:49 | 0 |
| 25 | Erick Rowan | 18 | Batista | 05:05 | 0 |
| 26 | Ryback | 19 | Batista | 04:01 | 0 |
| 27 | Alberto Del Rio | 20 | Batista | 03:00 | 0 |
| 28 | Batista | - | Winner | 13:02 | 4 |
| 29 | Big E Langston | 21 | Sheamus | 02:49 | 0 |
| 30 | Rey Mysterio | 22 | Seth Rollins | 02:10 | 0 |

Kane was already eliminated when he returned to eliminate CM Punk later in the match.

By eliminating 12 men, Roman Reigns broke the record of 11, set by Kane in Royal Rumble 2001.
