= ENSA (disambiguation) =

The Entertainments National Service Association (ENSA) was an organisation that provided entertainment for British armed forces personnel during World War II.

ENSA may also refer to:

- ENSA (gene)
- École Nationale des Sciences Appliquées d'Oujda, an engineering school in Morocco
- European Neutron Scattering Association, a contributor to the International Reactor Innovative and Secure design project
- Svea Airport (ICAO airport code ENSA), Sveagruva, Svalbard, Norway
- ENSA – Seguros de Angola

== See also ==
- South African English (en-ZA)
- ENSAE (disambiguation)
- Enza (disambiguation)
- Enca (disambiguation), including "ença"
