= Enza (disambiguation) =

Enza is a river in northern Italy.

Enza may also refer to:

- Enza (given name), a list of people with the name
- Enza Station, a railway station in Takamatsu, Kagawa, Japan
- Daedalus (yacht), a maxi-catamaran named ENZA New Zealand in 1993 and 1994
- South African English (en-ZA)

== See also ==
- Enza Zaden, a Dutch vegetable breeding company
- ENSA (disambiguation)
- Enzo (disambiguation)
