= Enca =

Enca, or variations, may refer to:

- eNCA, a 24-hour television news broadcaster
- Enca (singer) (born 1995, as Ruensa Haxhiaj), Albanian singer
- Ença Fati (born 1993), Bissauan soccer player
- Canadian English (en-CA)

== See also ==
- ENSA (disambiguation)
- Enka (disambiguation)
- Corvus enca (C. enca), the Sunda crow
