= History of WWE =

The history of American professional wrestling promotion WWE dates back to the early 1950s when it was founded on January 7, 1953, as the Capitol Wrestling Corporation (CWC). The public branding of the company has undergone several name changes throughout the years, from the CWC to the World Wide Wrestling Federation (WWWF) in 1963, then the World Wrestling Federation (WWF) in 1979, and to World Wrestling Entertainment (WWE) in 2002. Since 2011, it has branded itself solely as WWE. On September 12, 2023, Endeavor, the parent company of mixed martial arts promotion Ultimate Fighting Championship and WWE, merged the two companies into a new parent company, TKO Group Holdings. WWE and UFC continue to operate as separate divisions of the company with WWE focusing on professional wrestling and UFC focusing on mixed martial arts. In 2023, WWE's legal name was changed to World Wrestling Entertainment, LLC, although the branded name remained WWE.

WWE is the largest professional wrestling promotion in the world. It has promoted some of the most successful wrestlers and storylines, and featured some of the most iconic and significant matches and moments in the history of sports entertainment. WWE airs several high-profile programs, such as Raw and SmackDown, in more than 150 countries, hosts at least 12 pay-per-view events a year including its flagship event WrestleMania, and holds approximately 320 live events a year throughout the world. In 2014, WWE launched the first 24/7 streaming network (WWE Network), which would eventually showcase the entire WWE video library (WWE Libraries).

== Capitol Wrestling Corporation ==
=== Early years (1953–1963) ===
WWE's origins can be traced back to the 1950s when on January 7, 1953, the first show under the Capitol Wrestling Corporation (CWC) was produced. There is some uncertainty as to who the founder of the CWC was. Some sources state that it was Vincent J. McMahon, while other sources cite McMahon's father, Roderick James "Jess" McMahon (who died in 1954) as the original founder of CWC. The NWA recognized an undisputed NWA World Heavyweight Champion that went to several different professional wrestling promotions in the NWA. The championship was defended around the world. The NWA generally promoted strong shooters as champions, to give their worked sport credibility and guard against double-crosses. While doing strong business in the Midwest (the NWA's core region), these wrestlers attracted little interest in the CWC territory. In 1961, the NWA board decided instead to put the championship on bleach blond showman "Nature Boy" Buddy Rogers, a much more effective drawing card in the region.

The rest of the NWA was unhappy with McMahon and Toots Mondt because he rarely allowed Rogers to wrestle outside of the Northeast. Mondt and McMahon wanted Rogers to keep the NWA World Heavyweight Championship, but Rogers was unwilling to sacrifice his $25,000 deposit on the championship belt (championship holders at the time had to pay a deposit to insure they honored their commitments as champion). Rogers lost the NWA World Heavyweight Championship to Lou Thesz in a one-fall match in Toronto, Ontario, Canada on January 24, 1963, which led to Mondt, McMahon, and the CWC leaving the NWA in protest, creating the World Wide Wrestling Federation (WWWF) in the process.

== World Wide Wrestling Federation ==
=== Rise of Bruno Sammartino (1963–1979) ===
The official WWWF logo from 1963 to 1979

The World Wide Wrestling Federation (WWWF) was formed on January 24, 1963. On April 25, 1963, Buddy Rogers was awarded the new WWWF World Heavyweight Championship, supposedly winning an apocryphal tournament in Rio de Janeiro. He lost the championship to Bruno Sammartino a month later on May 17, 1963, after suffering a heart attack shortly before the match. To accommodate Rogers' condition, the match was booked to last under a minute.

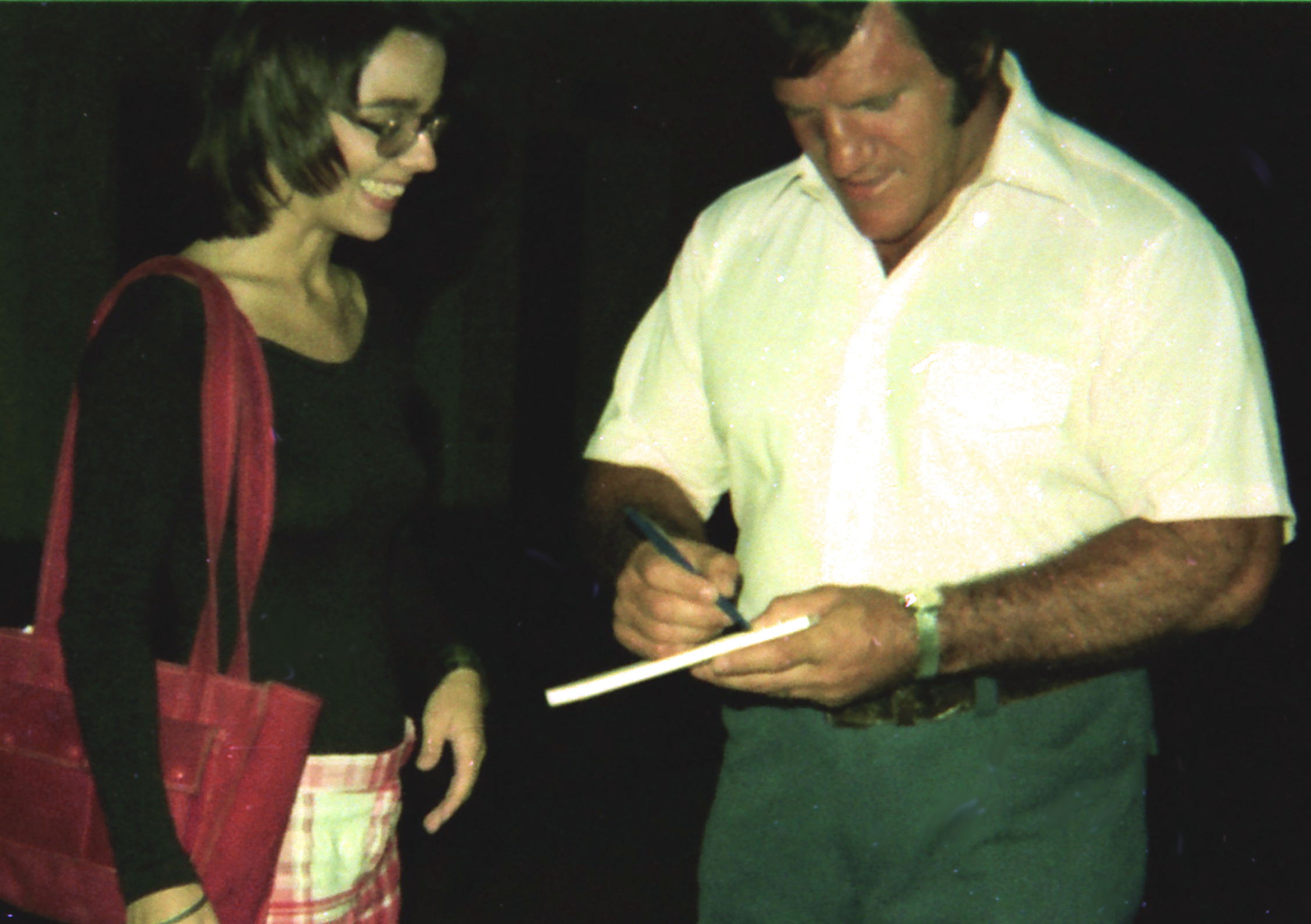
Bruno Sammartino (right) is the all-time longest-reigning WWWF World Heavyweight Champion and one of the most prolific wrestlers in the sport

Sammartino would retain the title for seven years, eight months and one day (2,803 days), making his the longest continuous world championship reign in men's wrestling history. Although Sammartino was the face of the WWWF, wrestlers such as Superstar Billy Graham and Bob Backlund were also hugely popular. The WWWF gained notoriety in the 1970s by holding their biggest shows at Shea Stadium or Madison Square Garden and doing strong business across the entire Northeast megalopolis. They leveraged former, but still popular, wrestlers such as Captain Lou Albano, "Grand Wizard of Wrestling" Ernie Roth and "Classy" Freddie Blassie to act as managers for Sammartino's heel (villainous) opponents. At this time, only babyface (fan favorite) wrestlers were allowed to have long championship reigns, such as Bruno Sammartino, Pedro Morales and Bob Backlund, who all retained for more than one year each. The heel champions, such as Ivan Koloff and Stan Stasiak, were used to "transition" the championship from one wrestler to another, and they generally kept the title for no more than a single month-long program before dropping it to the next babyface. Graham was the only heel character to keep his championship for longer than one month, as the WWWF felt it needed time to build Backlund up as championship material.

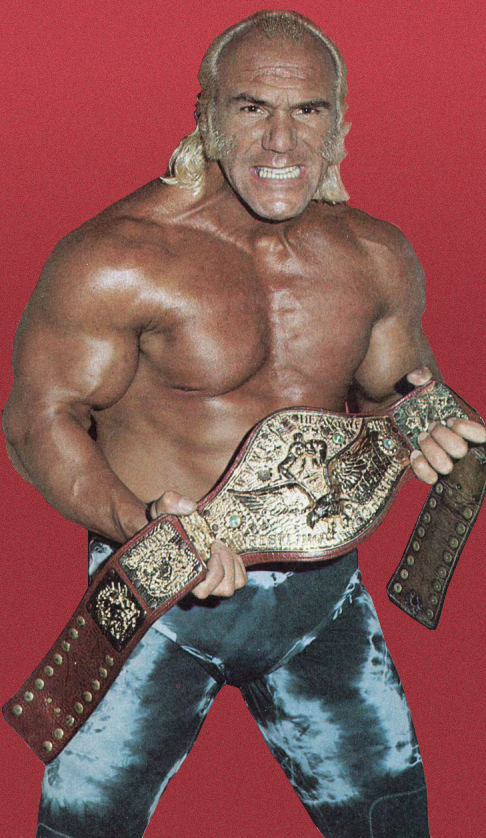
"Superstar" Billy Graham during his reign as WWWF World Champion in September 1977.

The WWWF was relatively conservative for promotions of its day; running its major arenas monthly rather than weekly or bi-weekly. Programs generally involved a babyface champion facing a heel challenger for one to three meetings in each scheduled town; for longer programs the heel would often win the first match in a non-decisive manner such as a countout or via excessive blood loss, and the champion would then retain in an ultraviolent blow-off match such as a steel cage match or Texas Death match. Unlike most of the NWA territories, the main event would occur in the middle of the arena show cards, allowing the company to build upon the match's finish in order to sell tickets to the next event; reliable, popular workers such as Chief Jay Strongbow would then wrestle at the end of the show to send the crowd home happy. The WWWF also featured popular wrestlers based out of non-WWWF territories such as Dusty Rhodes and retained the services of (at the time) the most popular and highly paid wrestler in the world, André the Giant, in between his territorial and international obligations.

WWWF held their then-major event Showdown at Shea three times at Flushing, New York's Shea Stadium in 1972, 1976 and 1980. Bruno Sammartino main evented the 1972 and 1980 events, wrestling Pedro Morales to a 75-minute time limit draw in 1972, and defeating Larry Zbyszko in a Steel cage match in 1980. The main event of the 1976 event was a "Boxer vs Wrestler" fight between Muhammad Ali and Antonio Inoki which ended in a draw. At that event, Sammartino had retained the WWWF World Heavyweight Championship against Stan Hansen. The 1972, 1976 and 1980 events each had attendance figures of 22,508, 32,000, and 36,295 respectively.

Toots Mondt left the WWWF in the late 1960s, and Vincent J. McMahon assumed complete control of the organization in 1971. Later that year, The Mongols created controversy after they left the WWWF with the WWWF International Tag Team Championship. As a result, the championship would be considered inactive until Luke Graham and Tarzan Tyler won a tournament to claim the championship. They then defeated the Mongols in November 1971, voiding any claim The Mongols had to the championship.

== World Wrestling Federation ==
=== Purchase by Vince McMahon Jr. (1979–1984) ===
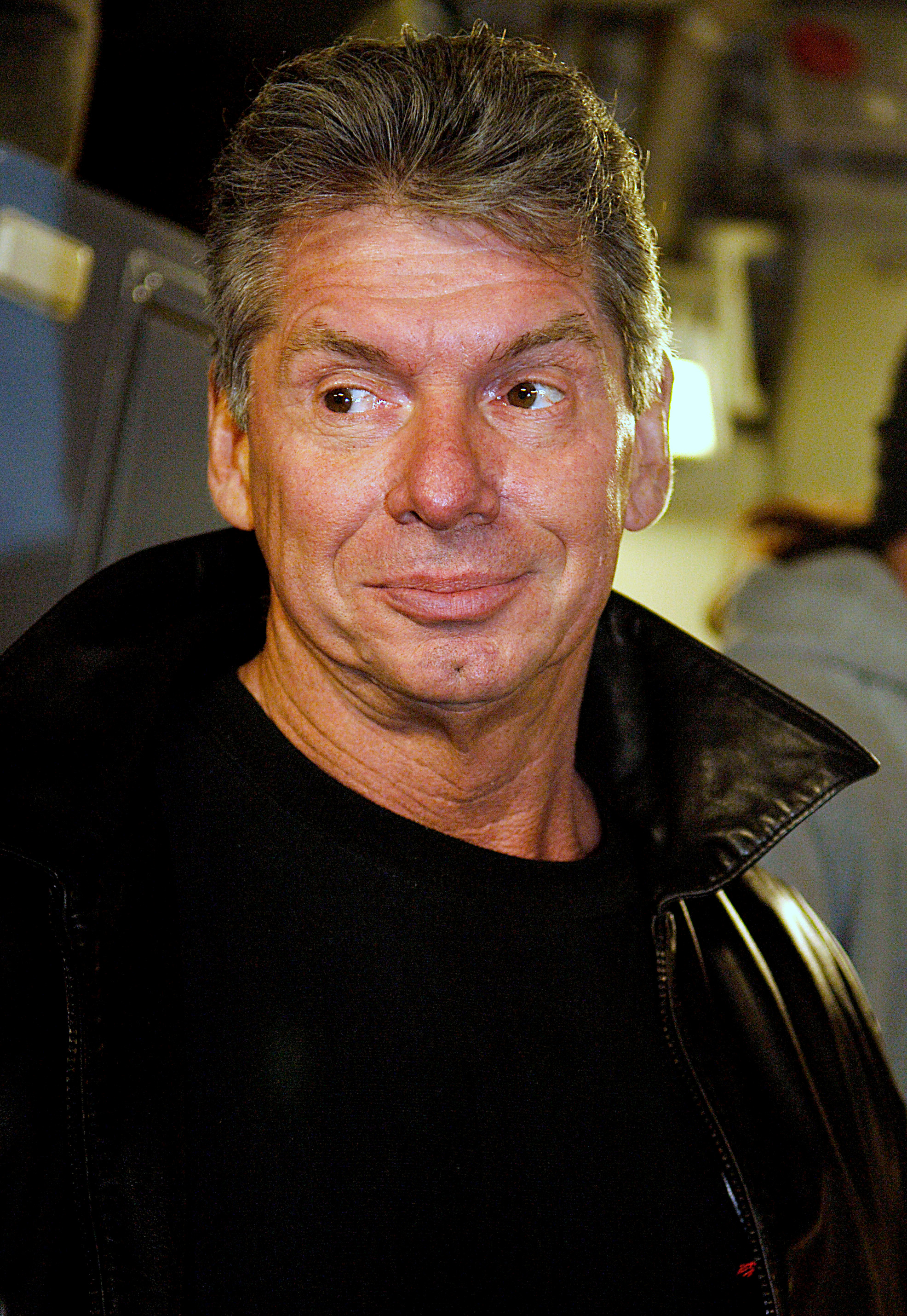
Vince McMahon, former Chairman of the WWE

In March 1979, for marketing purposes, the World Wide Wrestling Federation was renamed as the World Wrestling Federation (WWF). In 1980, Vincent K. McMahon, the son of Vincent J. McMahon, founded Titan Sports, Inc. and applied trademarks for the initials "WWF". Two years later in 1982, McMahon purchased Capitol Sports, the parent company of the WWF, from his father and associates Gorilla Monsoon and Arnold Skaaland. Seeking to make the WWF the premier wrestling promotion in the world, he began an expansion process that fundamentally changed the industry. In an interview with Sports Illustrated, McMahon noted:

In the old days, there were wrestling fiefdoms all over the country, each with its own little lord in charge. Each little lord respected the rights of his neighboring little lord. No takeovers or raids were allowed. There were maybe 30 of these tiny kingdoms in the U.S. and if I hadn't bought out my dad, there would still be 30 of them, fragmented and struggling. I, of course, had no allegiance to those little lords.

Upon taking over the company, McMahon immediately worked to get WWF programming on syndicated television all across the United States. This angered other promoters and disrupted the well-established boundaries of the different wrestling promotions. In addition, the company used income generated by advertising, television deals, and tape sales to secure talent from rival promoters. Capitol Sports already controlled most of the northeastern territory, but the younger McMahon wanted the WWF to be a national wrestling promotion, something the NWA did not approve of. He withdrew his promotion from the NWA, much like the American Wrestling Association, which controlled the upper Midwest. To become a national promotion, the WWF would have to become bigger than the AWA or any NWA promotion.

=== Golden Era (1984–1993) ===
The World Wrestling Federation logo. A variation of this logo was used from 1982 to 1997.

McMahon's vision for his promotion was starting to become possible when he signed AWA talent Hulk Hogan, who had achieved popularity outside of wrestling – notably for his appearance in Rocky III as Thunderlips. McMahon signed Rowdy Roddy Piper as Hogan's rival, and shortly afterward signed Jesse "The Body" Ventura. Other significant wrestlers who were part of the roster included: Big John Studd, André the Giant, Jimmy "Superfly" Snuka, "The Magnificent" Don Muraco, Junkyard Dog, "Mr. Wonderful" Paul Orndorff, Greg "The Hammer" Valentine, Ricky "The Dragon" Steamboat, and Nikolai Volkoff. In 1984, Hogan was pushed to main event status. He defeated WWF World Heavyweight Champion The Iron Sheik at Madison Square Garden on January 23, 1984, and thus evolved into one of the most recognizable and popular faces in professional wrestling. This event is often considered the start of WWF's Golden Era, or "Hulkamania".

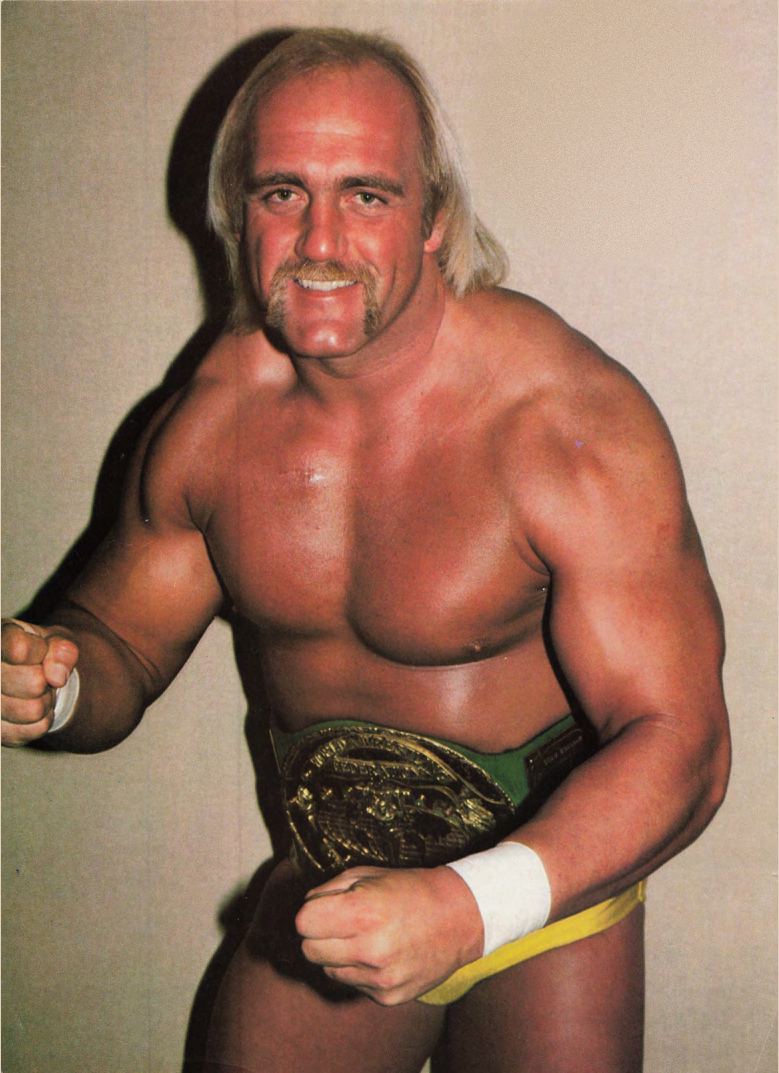
Hulk Hogan pictured in 1985, during his first reign as WWF World Champion, was the biggest WWF star during the 1980s professional wrestling boom.

With reasonable revenue being made, McMahon was able to secure television deals, and WWF was being shown across the United States. McMahon also began selling videotapes of WWF events outside the Northeast through his Coliseum Video distribution company, again angering other promoters. The syndication of WWF programming forced promotions to engage in direct competition with the WWF. The increased revenue allowed McMahon to sign more talent, such as Brutus Beefcake, Tito Santana, Jake "The Snake" Roberts, Butch Reed, and "Hacksaw" Jim Duggan.

For McMahon to truly turn WWF into a national promotion, he needed to have WWF touring the entire United States. Such a venture was impossible with the revenue WWF currently had, so McMahon envisioned a way to obtain the necessary capital through a risky all-or-nothing gamble on a supercard concept called WrestleMania in 1985. WrestleMania would be a pay-per-view extravaganza, viewable on closed-circuit television and marketed as the Super Bowl of professional wrestling. WrestleMania was not the first supercard seen in professional wrestling, as the NWA had previously run Starrcade in 1983. However, McMahon's vision was to make WWF and the industry itself mainstream, targeting more of the general television audience by exploiting the entertainment side of the industry. With the inaugural WrestleMania, WWF initiated a joint-promotional campaign with MTV, which featured a great deal of WWF coverage and programming, in what was termed the Rock 'n' Wrestling Connection. The mainstream media attention brought on by celebrities including Muhammad Ali, Mr. T and Cyndi Lauper at the event helped propel WrestleMania to become a staple in popular culture, and the use of celebrities has been a staple of the company to the present day.

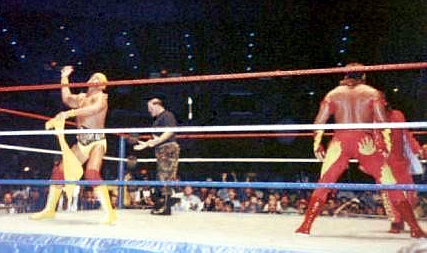
Hulk Hogan (left), Sergeant Slaughter (centre) and Brutus Beefcake (right) were mainstays of 1980's WWF wrestling

With the success of WrestleMania, other promotions which tried hard to keep the regional territory system alive started to merge under Jim Crockett Promotions (JCP). Starrcade and The Great American Bash were the JCP versions of WrestleMania, but even when operating inside of its territory, JCP had trouble matching the success of WWF. After Ted Turner purchased majority of JCP's assets, the promotion would become World Championship Wrestling (WCW), providing WWF with a competitor until 2001, when WCW and its trademarks were purchased by WWF. WrestleMania would become an annual pay-per-view phenomenon, being broadcast in nearly 150 countries and almost 20 different languages.

Perhaps the peak of the 1980s wrestling boom was WrestleMania III at the Pontiac Silverdome, which set a "claimed" attendance record of 93,173. In the main event Hulk Hogan retained the WWF Championship against André the Giant. Hogan and Andre faced each other in a rematch on February 5, 1985, in WWF The Main Event which drew a 15.2 Nielsen rating and 33 million viewers the highest in the history of professional wrestling, this time with Andre winning. McMahon used the success of WrestleMania to create more annual pay-per-views such as SummerSlam, the Royal Rumble and the Survivor Series, the latter two both receiving their names from unique stipulation matches featured at the event. These four shows would be jointly known as the “Big Four” of the company's programming up until the modern day.

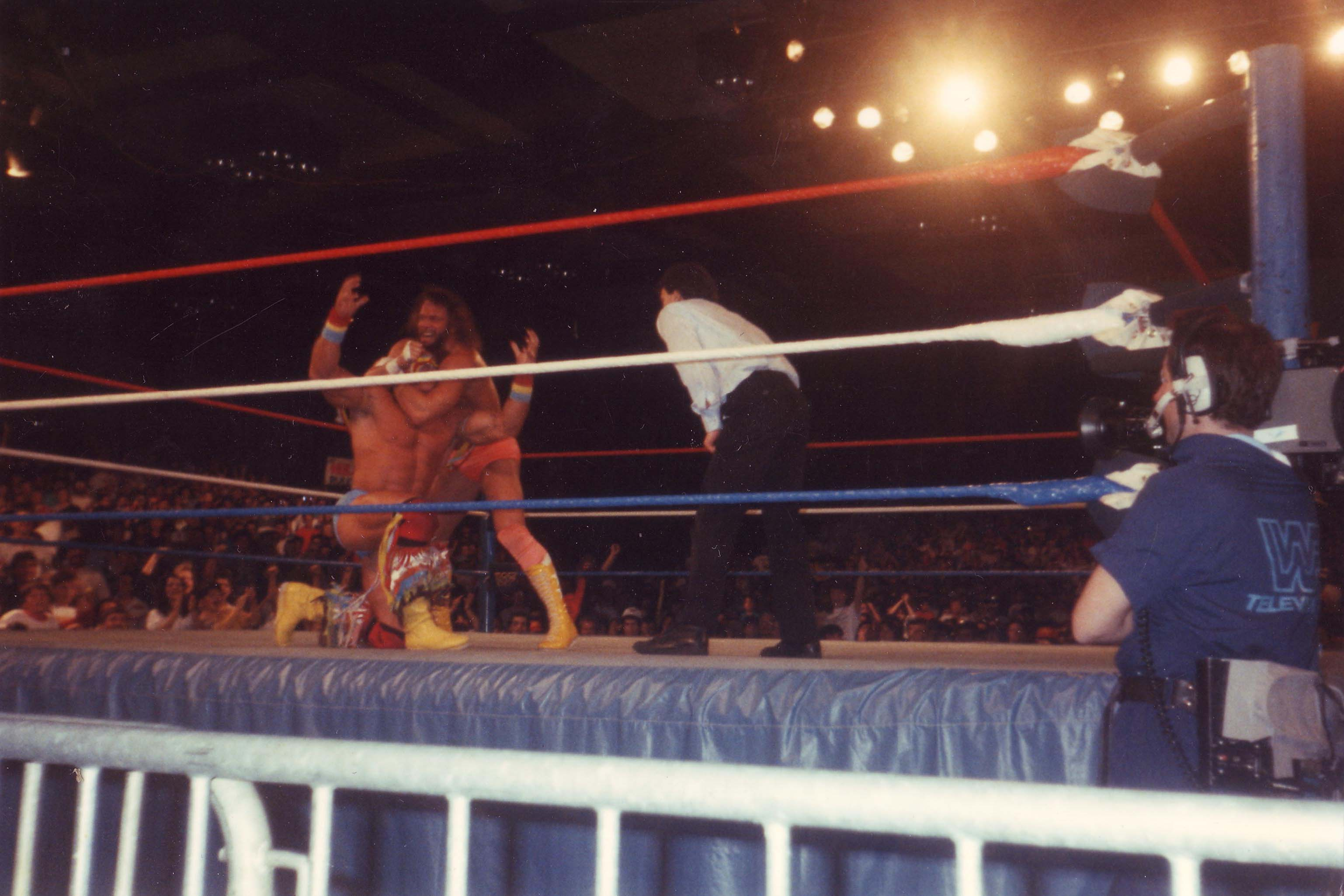
"Macho Man" Randy Savage vs Ultimate Warrior on March 7, 1989

During the 1980s, Hulk Hogan would cross over into mainstream prominence presented as an all-American hero. Hogan's time as the face of the WWF would last until he departed from the company in the summer of 1993. Other stars such as "Macho Man" Randy Savage, "Rowdy" Roddy Piper, Ultimate Warrior, The Honky Tonk Man, "Million Dollar Man" Ted DiBiase, and others also helped make WWF a financial success in this period. Jim Duggan won the first Royal Rumble match in 1988. While these talents were recognizable as individuals, some talent became better known for their teamwork as part of tag teams. Stables or groups such as Demolition, Strike Force, the Hart Foundation, the British Bulldogs, the Rockers and the Fabulous Rougeaus helped create a strong tag team division for WWF. Towards the end of the "Golden Age", Bret Hart of the Hart Foundation began to break out on his own as a singles competitor, with his most memorable match early on taking place at SummerSlam in 1992 against "The British Bulldog" Davey Boy Smith. Hart would eventually capture the WWF World Heavyweight Championship from Ric Flair later that year and would win the King of the Ring tournament the following year.

=== New Generation Era (1993–1997) ===
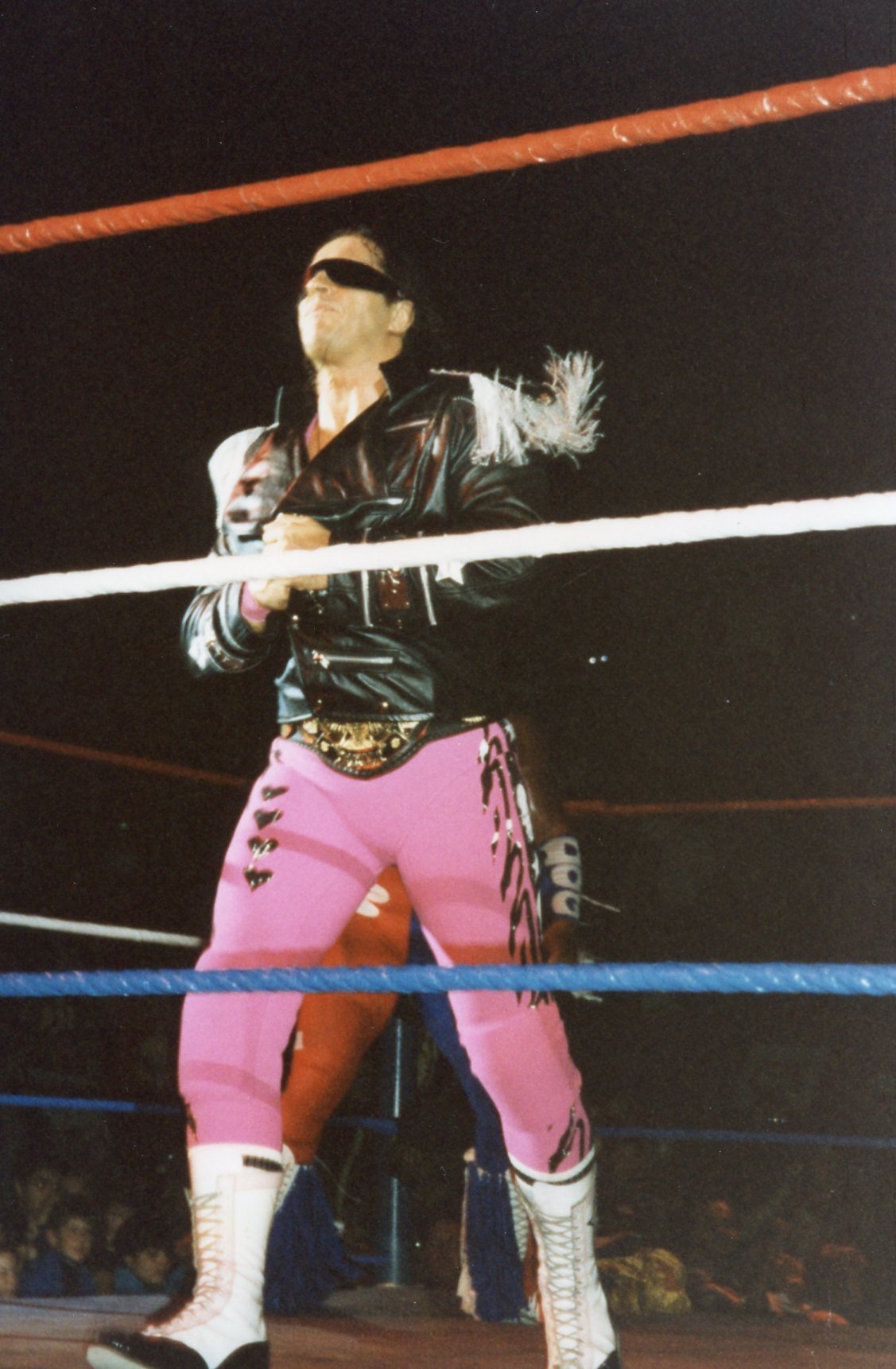
Bret Hart was by far the biggest star at this point and defeated Yokozuna to win back the WWF World Heavyweight Championship in the main event of WrestleMania 10.

In 1991, it was reported that Hulk Hogan, Roddy Piper, Rick Martel, Brian Blair, and Dan Spivey were to testify that they had purchased steroids from WWF physician Dr. George T. Zahorian, who was being charged with the illegal distribution of the drug. Two years later, Vince McMahon was indicted due to his connection to Zahorian, and faced a possible eight-year prison term and a $500,000 fine if convicted. The trial began on July 7, 1994, with the prosecutor, who promised to expose "the dark, corrupt underbelly" of WWF, claimed McMahon distributed steroids "like candy" and pressured wrestlers into taking the drug. Wrestler Nailz testified that McMahon had once said to him: "I strongly suggest you go on the gas". Days later, Hogan admitted that steroid use amongst WWF wrestlers was common, but denied ever being pressured into doing so by McMahon. A week later, McMahon was acquitted of all charges, and was quoted as saying "I'm elated. Just like in wrestling, in the end the good guys always win."

Blue and yellow themed logo used from 1995 to 1997, during the New Generation Era and the beginnings of Attitude Era

With business down in 1992 because of bad press from the steroid scandal – as well as the ring boy and Rita Chatterton sexual assault allegations – Vince McMahon began pushing younger talents into the spotlight over the next several years. By mid-1993, Bret "The Hitman" Hart, Shawn Michaels, The Undertaker, Razor Ramon, Diesel, Lex Luger, Yokozuna, Owen Hart, Crush, Tatanka and others all became the stars of what the WWF eventually branded as the "New Generation". The 1993 King of the Ring pay-per-view event, which saw Hogan's last televised with the WWF for the remainder of the 1990s and Bret Hart gaining greater prominence after winning the King of the Ring tournament, has been regarded as a major focal point for the New Generation era. Hulk Hogan would leave the company in the summer of 1993 and Hart would become one of the most popular stars of this period until his departure in 1997. In addition, the election of Bill Clinton as U.S. president in 1992 is acknowledged to have marked the spread of dramatic culture changes in the United States during this period in time.

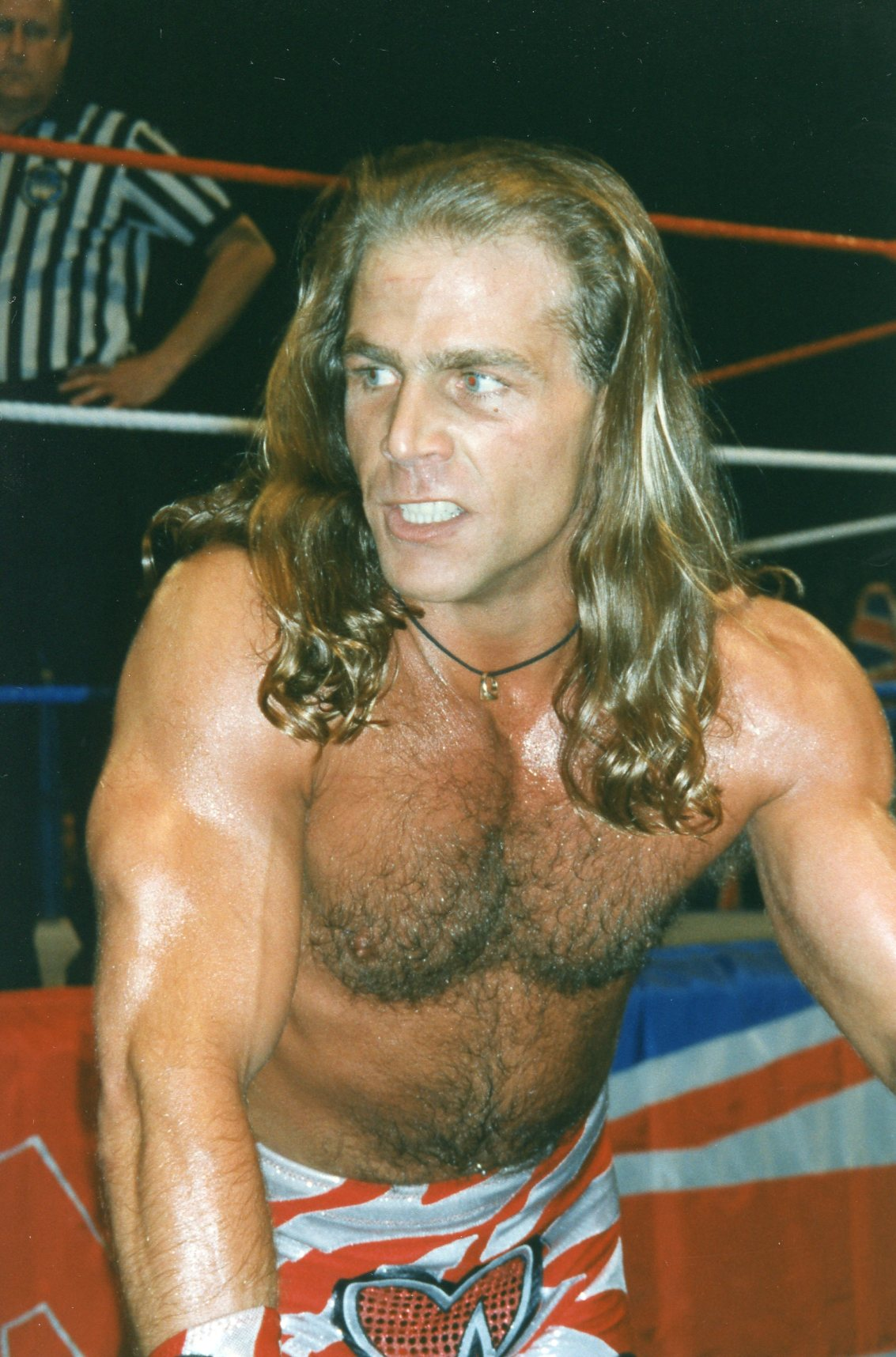
Shawn Michaels became the new big star of the WWF and defeated Bret Hart at WrestleMania XII in 1996 in a 60-minute Iron Man match for the WWF Championship.

Meanwhile, competition between the major wrestling companies increased. In January 1993, WWF created their prime time cable TV program Monday Night Raw, which aired on the USA Network. In 1994, WCW signed Hulk Hogan and other former WWF stars to multi-year contracts, and in 1995 launched Monday Nitro on TNT, to go head to head with Raw, starting the Monday Night War. At WrestleMania X in 1994 a ladder match between Shawn Michaels and Razor Ramon received critical acclaim and was said to be ground breaking and to have revolutionized the concept of ladder matches.

By mid-1996, with the introduction of the New World Order (nWo), a stable led by former WWF wrestlers Hulk Hogan, Scott Hall (Razor Ramon), and Kevin Nash (Diesel), Nitro started a near two years of ratings domination. More talent would eventually leave WWF for WCW including Ted DiBiase, Curt Hennig, reigning WWF Women's Champion Alundra Blayze and The 1-2-3 Kid while Bret Hart decided to stay with the WWF in spite of a lucrative offer by WCW. Towards the end of the New Generation Era, former WCW and ECW talent were being hired by the WWF, including Steve Austin (initially under The Ringmaster persona), Brian Pillman, Mankind, and Vader. Adopting the Stone Cold persona, Austin's rise to popularity began with his 1996 King of the Ring win and famous "Austin 3:16" speech. Despite starting out as a villain, Austin's popularity would start to gradually exceed those of the top fan favorites in the promotion. The New Generation also saw the debut of Rocky Maivia, who later adopted the more famous persona of The Rock.

At Badd Blood: In Your House in 1997, the first Hell in a Cell match would be held between The Undertaker and Shawn Michaels, which Michaels won after interference from Undertaker's storyline half brother Kane. The match received critical acclaim. The Hell in a Cell match has since become one of the most popular gimmick matches in wrestling history.

=== Attitude Era (1997–2002) ===
In 1997, Vince McMahon responded to WCW's big success by taking the WWF in a different direction with more realistic characters and edgier storylines. Also that year, McMahon informed Bret Hart that he could no longer afford to pay him what his contract stated, and suggested that he go back to the more lucrative deal that WCW had offered him. Hart signed with WCW, but a behind-the-scenes controversy developed over Hart's final matches, resulting in the Montreal Screwjob. At Survivor Series on November 9, 1997, WWF debuted the "WWF Attitude" scratch logo which would be the company's signature throughout the Attitude Era. Hart was defending the WWF World Heavyweight Championship against Shawn Michaels at the event, when McMahon ordered the referee to award the match and the championship to Michaels as if Hart had submitted. While Hart went on to WCW, McMahon received enormous backlash from the media, wrestlers, and fans alike. This inspired him to create the Mr. McMahon character, a villainous extension of his status as a promoter.

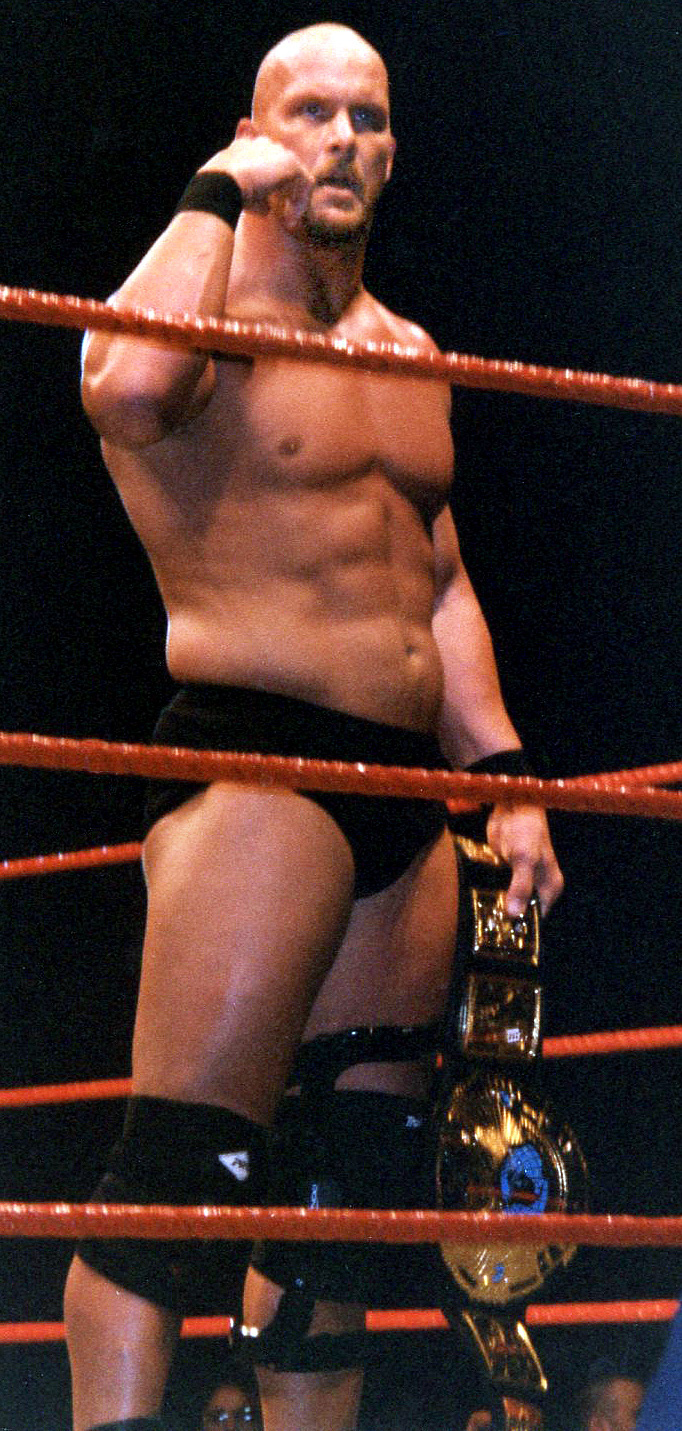
Stone Cold Steve Austin is one of the most popular stars in WWE history. His rivalry with Vince MacMahon is often cited as having turned the tides in favor for WWF in the Monday Night War against rival promotion WCW, leading to WWF emerging victorious by 2001.

On December 15, 1997, Vince McMahon aired a promo on Raw Is War addressing the audience on the company embarking on a "more innovative and contemporary campaign", which would advise parent discretion for a younger audience. This episode also marked the beginning of the scratch logo being officially used for WWF television broadcasts and went into full effect, replacing the New Generation logo. Following Hart's departure, the company implemented a heavy push of popular anti-hero character Stone Cold Steve Austin, whose rising popularity was similar to Hulk Hogan's popularity in the 1980s. During an angle involving Mike Tyson at WrestleMania XIV in March 1998, Austin became WWF Champion by beating Shawn Michaels, making him the face of the company and starting his feud with Mr. McMahon; this feud would be very important in the WWF turning the tides in the ratings war with rival company WCW.

Meanwhile, The Rock, Triple H, Mick Foley, Kurt Angle, The Big Show and Kane strengthened WWF's singles division, while stables such as D-Generation X (consisting of Shawn Michaels, Triple H, Rick Rude, X-Pac, Road Dogg, Billy Gunn and Chyna) and the Nation of Domination helped the fight against rival company WCW. WWF head writer Vince Russo contributed to the formation of D-Generation X in 1997, The Undertaker vs. Kane feud in 1998, the Stone Cold vs. Mr. McMahon feud, the rise of The Rock, and Mick Foley's three face pushes during the Attitude Era, which helped put Raw ahead of Nitro in the ratings. Russo's booking style was often referred to as "Crash TV", which included edgy, controversial storylines involving sexual content, profanity, swerves or unexpected heel turns, and worked shoots in the storylines. As well as short matches, backstage vignettes, shocking angles and levels of depicted violence.

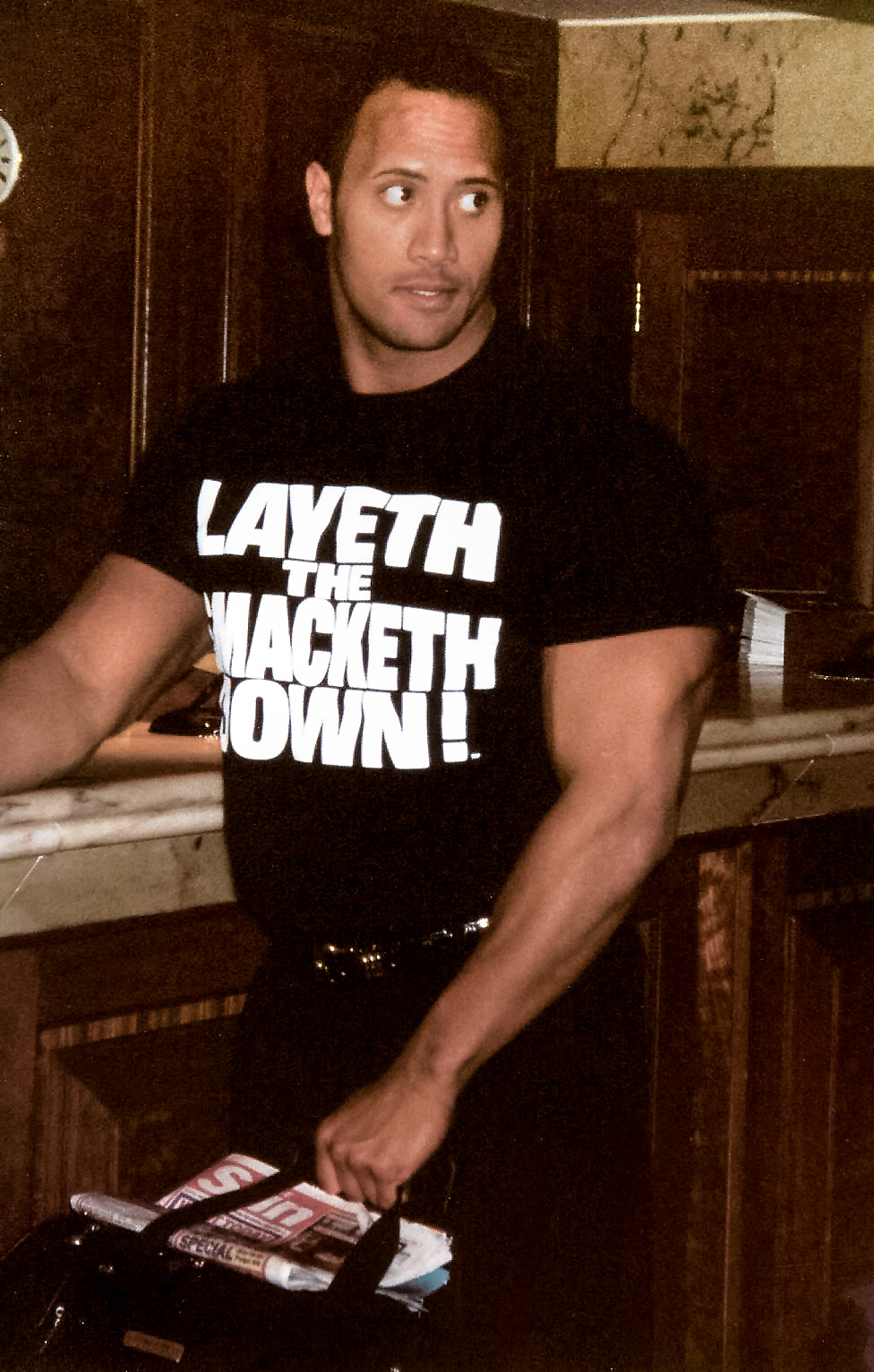
The Rock's popularity was fueled by his charisma and speaking abilities, which led to many catchphrases and merchandising opportunities. His segments drew massive ratings during the Attitude Era.

WWF rebounded in its ratings and popularity, with Raw Is War finally beating Nitro for the first time in 84 weeks on April 13, 1998. Ratings would continue to rise through 1998 and 1999; a 12-minute match between Steve Austin and the Undertaker drew a 9.5 rating on June 28, 1999. It currently stands as the highest-rated segment in Raw history. The Attitude Era saw WWF expand its television coverage and its business structure, as well. During the summer of 1999, WWF's parent company, Titan Sports, was renamed World Wrestling Federation Entertainment, Inc. (WWFE, Inc. or WWFE), and on October 19, 1999, became a publicly traded company, offering 10 million shares priced at $17 each, and began trading on the New York Stock Exchange in October 2000.

In 1999, WWF launched a secondary program known as SmackDown! on the UPN network to compete with WCW's Thunder. SmackDown!'s pilot debuted as a special on April 29, 1999. Beginning on August 26, 1999, the WWF program was aired weekly. In 2000, WWF, in collaboration with television network NBC, created XFL, a new professional football league. XFL was a failure, having only lasted a single year before closing its doors.

Head writer Chris Kreski replaced Vince Russo and Ed Ferrara, who defected to WCW in 1999. Kreski's work was admired for well-planned and detailed storylines, and the transitional period saw feuds and storylines such as the Triple H/Cactus Jack feud, the Triple H/Kurt Angle/Stephanie McMahon love triangle, and a highly successful feud between The Hardy Boyz, Edge and Christian, and The Dudley Boyz. At Survivor Series, WWF's top star, Stone Cold Steve Austin, was run over by a car at the Joe Louis Arena in Detroit, Michigan to write him off of television due to a serious neck injury. At SummerSlam in 2000, WWF debuted the highly popular Tables, Ladders, and Chairs match, the inaugural match seeing Edge and Christian defeating The Dudley Boyz and The Hardy Boyz for the WWF Tag Team Championship.

Prior to WrestleMania 2000, the McMahon family had gone into an on-screen rivalry with each other for the first time, setting up the "McMahon in Every Corner" four-way elimination main event between Big Show (managed by Shane McMahon), The Rock (managed by Mr. McMahon), Triple H (managed by Stephanie McMahon-Helmsley), and future WWF Commissioner Mick Foley (managed by Linda McMahon). Triple H won after Mr. McMahon turned on The Rock and thus retained the WWF Championship. This was historically significant as the first time a heel wrestler had won the main event of Wrestlemania.

Stone Cold Steve Austin would make his return to the company at Unforgiven 2000 and then would make his in-ring return at No Mercy, to gain revenge on Rikishi, who had been revealed as the driver of limousine that had struck Austin at Survivor Series. Austin would go on to win the next year's Royal Rumble match and come out victorious against The Rock for the WWF Championship at WrestleMania X-Seven with help from his former rival, Mr. McMahon, turning heel in the process. At this point WWF won the Monday Night War against WCW.

==== Purchase of WCW and ECW and the Invasion (2001–2002) ====
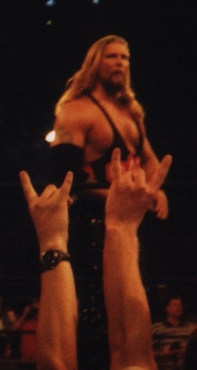
Kevin Nash was a key member of nWo

In the Invasion storyline, Shane McMahon (kayfabe) acquired World Championship Wrestling (WCW) in April 2001 and WCW personnel invaded WWF. For the first time since the Monday Night War, WWF's purchase of WCW had made a major American inter-promotional feud possible, but the Invasion turned out to be a disappointment to many fans. One main reason would be that many of WCW's big-name stars were still under contract to WCW's old parent company, AOL Time Warner, rather than WCW itself, and their contracts were not included in the purchase of the company. These wrestlers chose to sit out the duration of their contracts and be financially supported by AOL Time Warner rather than work for WWF for a cheaper salary.

On July 9, 2001, the stars of WCW and Extreme Championship Wrestling (acquired by Stephanie McMahon in a related storyline) joined forces, forming "The Alliance" with WCW owner Shane McMahon and the new owner of ECW Stephanie McMahon leading the charge, with the support and influence of original ECW owner Paul Heyman. At Invasion, Stone Cold Steve Austin turned on WWF and helped the Alliance win the Inaugural Brawl. At Survivor Series, WWF finally defeated WCW and ECW in a "Winner Takes All Match" and the angle was concluded. In the aftermath of the Invasion angle, WWF made several major changes to their product. Ric Flair returned to the WWF as "co-owner" of the company, feuding with Vince McMahon. Jerry Lawler returned to the company after a nine-month hiatus, after his replacement on commentary, Paul Heyman, was fired on-screen by Vince McMahon. Several former Alliance stars were absorbed into the regular WWF roster, such as Booker T, The Hurricane, Lance Storm, and Rob Van Dam. At Vengeance 2001, Chris Jericho went on to unify the WCW Championship and WWF Championship, beating both The Rock and Steve Austin on the same night.

Eventually, Vince McMahon brought back Hollywood Hulk Hogan, Kevin Nash, and Scott Hall to reunite the nWo at the No Way Out pay-per-view in February 2002. However, Hogan proved to be too popular with nostalgic fans of the Golden Era's "Hulkamania" and soon turned face at WrestleMania X8 after his classic match with The Rock, which The Rock won. With an excess of talent employed as a result of having purchased WCW and later ECW, the WWF needed a way to provide exposure for all of its talent. This problem was solved by introducing a "Brand Extension", with the roster split in half and the talent assigned to either Raw or SmackDown! in a mock draft lottery. Wrestlers, commentators and referees became show-exclusive, and the shows were given separate on-screen General Managers. On the March 25, 2002, episode of Raw, the World Wrestling Federation had the first ever WWF draft lottery, which meant the WWF wrestlers are separated between two brands, Raw and SmackDown!. This became effective on April 1, 2002.

== World Wrestling Entertainment/WWE ==
=== Ruthless Aggression Era (2002–2008) ===
The official WWE logo from May 6, 2002, to August 17, 2014

In 2002, the World Wrestling Federation lost a lawsuit initiated by the World Wildlife Fund over the WWF trademark. The World Wrestling Federation was forced to rebrand itself and changed its business name to World Wrestling Entertainment (WWE) on May 6, 2002. The company also dropped its "WWF Attitude" moniker that same day and eliminated all uses of the word "WWF"; this affected licensed merchandise such as action figures, video games, and home video releases with its previous logo, which was replaced by a new "scratch" logo with only the two letter Ws and a red slash at the bottom of the logo. However, the older "block logo, which the company was no longer using at the time of the legal dispute and the full-length "World Wrestling Federation" name could be used by WWE when referencing history. During this time, the company launched WWE Studios, which was originally formed as WWE Films.

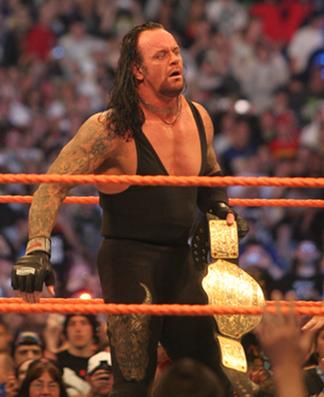
The Undertaker (pictured here in March 2008) has been a highly popular figure in WWE since 1990, holding an undefeated WrestleMania streak until 2014.

On June 24, 2002, episode of Raw, Vince McMahon officially named the new era "Ruthless Aggression". Later that same year, after WWE Champion Brock Lesnar became exclusive to the SmackDown! brand and with the creation of the World Heavyweight Championship, all the championships became show-exclusive too. Additionally, both Raw and SmackDown! began to stage individual pay-per-view events featuring only performers from that brand, with only the major four pay-per-views Royal Rumble, WrestleMania, SummerSlam and Survivor Series remaining dual-branded. The practice of single-brand pay-per-view events was abandoned following WrestleMania 23. In effect, Raw and SmackDown were operated as two distinct promotions, with a draft lottery taking place each year to determine which talent was assigned to each brand. This lasted until August 2011, when the rosters were merged and the Brand Extension was quietly phased out.

After the company transitioned into its Ruthless Aggression era, this period still featured many elements of its predecessor the Attitude Era, including the levels of violence, sex, and profanity, but there was a larger emphasis on in-ring action. The two top stars of the Attitude Era, Stone Cold Steve Austin and The Rock, eventually left the company in 2003 and 2004, respectively, while newcomers such as Brock Lesnar, who would become the youngest WWE Champion, and Randy Orton, who became the youngest World Heavyweight Champion, saw huge success. Triple H would also be featured prominently during this time, winning several of his fourteen world championships, as would The Undertaker, whose WrestleMania win streak started gaining fame. Eddie Guerrero, Rey Mysterio, Kurt Angle, Chris Benoit, Edge, Brock Lesnar, Randy Orton, John Cena, Batista, John "Bradshaw" Layfield, and Rob Van Dam were also given main event opportunities and all ended up becoming multiple-time world champions. From mid-2002 to 2003, WWE brought several prominent WCW stars to the company, including Eric Bischoff, Scott Steiner, Goldberg, Kevin Nash and Ric Flair. The Great American Bash, originally a WCW pay-per-view event, made its debut as a WWE event.

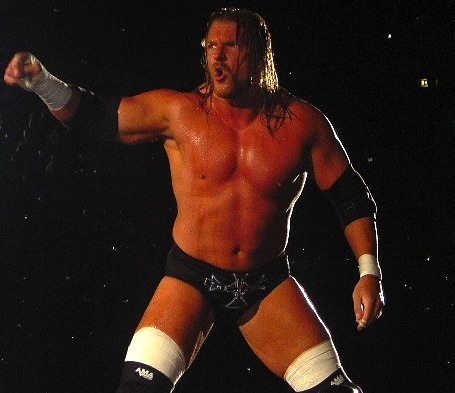
Triple H was a very prominent wrestler during this period, main-eventing WrestleMania XX, WrestleMania 21 and WrestleMania 22, respectively. He led the prominent villainous stable Evolution. He has since won 14 world championships in the WWE.

In August 2002, Shawn Michaels would also return as a wrestler at SummerSlam after a hiatus of over four years. He would achieve great success, and won the World Heavyweight Championship in the first Elimination Chamber match at Survivor Series. The match between Shawn Michaels and Kurt Angle at WrestleMania 21 has been named one of the greatest matches in WWE history. Though Angle won the match, Michaels received praise for his "courageous effort". In 2006, Michaels would reunite with Triple H to reform the popular 1990s group D-Generation X (DX). They would have major feuds with The Spirit Squad, the McMahon family, and the newly established Rated-RKO (Edge and Randy Orton), which ended prematurely when Triple H suffered a torn quadriceps muscle in 2007 at New Year's Revolution.

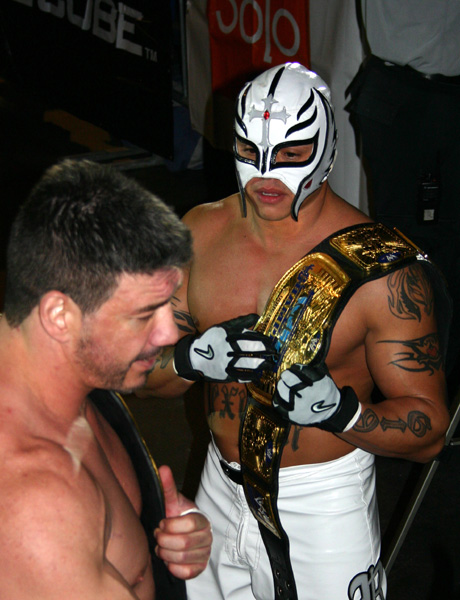
Eddie Guerrero and Rey Mysterio, two of the most successful and popular Hispanic wrestlers in WWE history as WWE Tag Team Champions in 2005.

Eddie Guerrero, from the famous Mexican Guerrero wrestling family, achieved huge stardom during this period. He gained a large fanbase in 2003 on SmackDown!, which led to a rapid increase in his popularity, promoting him to main event status, and he ultimately won his first world championship, the WWE Championship, at No Way Out in 2004, defeating Brock Lesnar in a highly acclaimed match. He remained the top wrestler of the company after winning the WWE title until his untimely death on November 13, 2005. He was inducted into the WWE Hall of Fame the following year. Guerrero's death due to his drug addictions caused WWE to implement the WWE Wellness Policy to prevent wrestlers from taking drugs. The circumstances of his death would provide a medium for his on- and off-screen friend Rey Mysterio to emerge as a major main-eventer and win the 2006 Royal Rumble match and the World Heavyweight Championship at WrestleMania 22. Mysterio had begun a rivalry with the villainous nephew of Eddie, Chavo Guerrero, who had cost him the World Heavyweight Championship during a match with King Booker. During the feud Mysterio injured his knees and would be sidelined for the rest of 2006 and much of 2007, halting his main event push. Mysterio returned and defeated Chavo in the 2007 edition of SummerSlam and remained a popular fan-favorite wrestler.

John Cena was one of the biggest breakout stars of the Ruthless Aggression era. Upon his debut, Cena quickly proved popular due to his "Doctor of Thuganomics" white rapper gimmick on the SmackDown brand, receiving a WWE Championship match against Brock Lesnar in the spring at Backlash in 2003, and had a major feud with The Undertaker during the summer. At WrestleMania 21, he won his first world championship when he defeated John "Bradshaw" Layfield, the WWE Champion at that time. Cena's popularity soared when he was drafted to Raw, where he quickly became the face of WWE, a rise not seen since Austin and Hulk Hogan. Cena's popularity has led to him becoming the all-time record "wish maker" for the Make-A-Wish Foundation, granting over 500 wishes as of August 2017. Cena secured victories over veterans Triple H and Shawn Michaels in the main events of WrestleMania 22 and WrestleMania 23, respectively. A popular wrestler during the period was Bobby Lashley from the ECW brand. Cena would defeat Lashley at The Great American Bash in 2007 in a well-received match, shortly after which Lashley left the WWE. After being sidelined due to a shoulder injury for the latter half of 2007, Cena returned in the 2008 Royal Rumble match, winning the match.

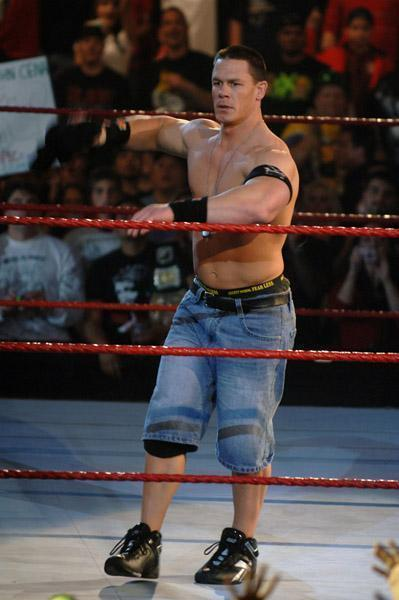
John Cena was by far the biggest star to emerge during the Ruthless Aggression Era.

Triple H, Randy Orton, Ric Flair, and Batista were part of the villainous stable Evolution, who were prominently featured between 2003 and 2005 until their eventual break-up. Beginning in early 2005, the popularity of Batista would soar much like Cena's, winning the 2005 Royal Rumble and the World Heavyweight Championship at WrestleMania 21 from Triple H. Later in 2005, Batista would go on to defeat Triple H in a highly acclaimed Hell in a Cell match at Vengeance. Although Batista would have major success in the months following his championship win, he would suffer an injury in early 2006 and miss that year's WrestleMania. After returning and eventually winning another world championship, at WrestleMania 23 in 2007, Batista would defend the title against The Undertaker in a classic encounter, though he lost the match. However, Batista defeated The Undertaker at Cyber Sunday. Cena and Batista would not face each other for the first time until SummerSlam in 2008, with Batista winning.

Randy Orton became prominent during this period, becoming the youngest world champion in WWE history at the age of 24, defeating Chris Benoit at the 2004 SummerSlam event. Dubbed "the Legend Killer," he would go on to have feuds with legendary wrestlers such as The Undertaker and Hulk Hogan, facing them at WrestleMania 21 and the 2006 SummerSlam event, respectively. Along with Edge, he would form the villainous tag team Rated-RKO and find success in the tag team division. After returning to singles competition Orton became a multi-time WWE Champion. In 2007 Orton began a long lasting on and off rivalry with John Cena, which lasted until 2014. Orton would also be involved in a lengthy rivalry with former Evolution leader Triple H, defeating him in a Last Man Standing match at No Mercy in 2007 but a year later losing to him in another Last Man Standing match at One Night Stand in 2008.

Rising star CM Punk made his WWE debut in 2006, wrestling his first main roster match at Survivor Series that year in a 5-on-5 Survivor Series elimination match as part of Team DX in a clean sweep victory over Team Rated-RKO. In 2008, he won the money in the bank briefcase, and on the June 30 episode of Raw, he cashed it in on the then-World Heavyweight Champion Edge, winning the title. The same night, he had to defend the title against John "Bradshaw" Layfield in the main event, but retained it. The final WWE event to receive an adult-oriented rating was the pay-per-view The Great American Bash in 2008, where Triple H retained the WWE Championship against Edge in the main event match. Following the event, WWE shifted to TV-PG, family-friendly programming.

==== Money in the Bank (2005) ====
The concept for the Money in the Bank match was introduced in March 2005 by Chris Jericho. Jericho pitched the idea on an episode of Raw to general manager Eric Bischoff, who liked it and promptly signed it for WrestleMania 21, assigning Jericho, Christian, Chris Benoit, Edge, Shelton Benjamin, and Kane to participate in the match. Edge won this inaugural match, and since, many times the match became a way to help elevate new stars to the main event, with winners such as CM Punk, The Miz, Daniel Bryan, Alberto Del Rio, Seth Rollins, and Dean Ambrose. The match format was originally exclusive to the annual WrestleMania until 2010, when the Money in the Bank pay-per-view debuted. In 2017, the first women's Money in the Bank match was held, which was won by Carmella.

==== Return of ECW (2006–2010) ====
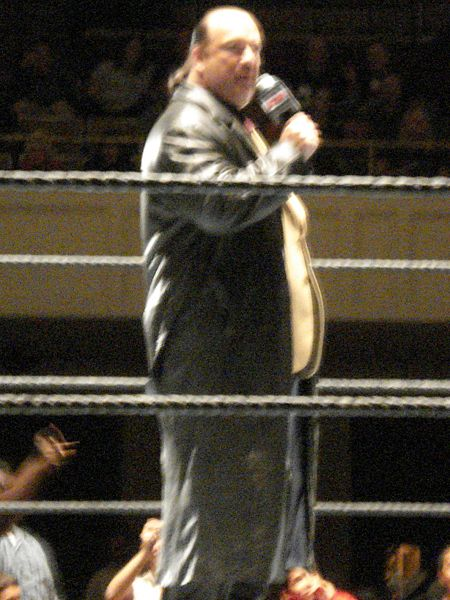
Paul Heyman, the former owner of ECW would later become a manager to numerous prominent wrestlers in the WWE.

By 2004, WWE began reintroducing Extreme Championship Wrestling (ECW) through content from the ECW video library and a series of books, which included the release of The Rise and Fall of ECW. On May 26, 2006, WWE relaunched the franchise with its own show on NBC Universal's Sci Fi Channel, later to be known as Syfy, starting June 13, 2006. Despite initial concerns that professional wrestling would not be accepted by Sci Fi Channel's demographic, network President Bonnie Hammer stated that she believed ECW would fit the channel's theme of "stretching the imagination".

On June 13, Paul Heyman, former ECW owner and newly appointed figurehead for the ECW brand, recommissioned the ECW World Heavyweight Championship to be the brand's world championship and awarded it to Rob Van Dam as a result of winning the WWE Championship at One Night Stand 2006. Under the WWE banner, ECW was presented in a modernized style to that when it was an independent promotion and was produced following the same format as the other brands, with match rules, such as count outs and disqualifications, being standard. Matches featuring the ruleset of the ECW promotion were classified as being contested under "Extreme Rules" and were only fought when specified otherwise. The brand would continue to operate until February 16, 2010, when the brand was rendered defunct.

=== PG Era (2008–2014) ===
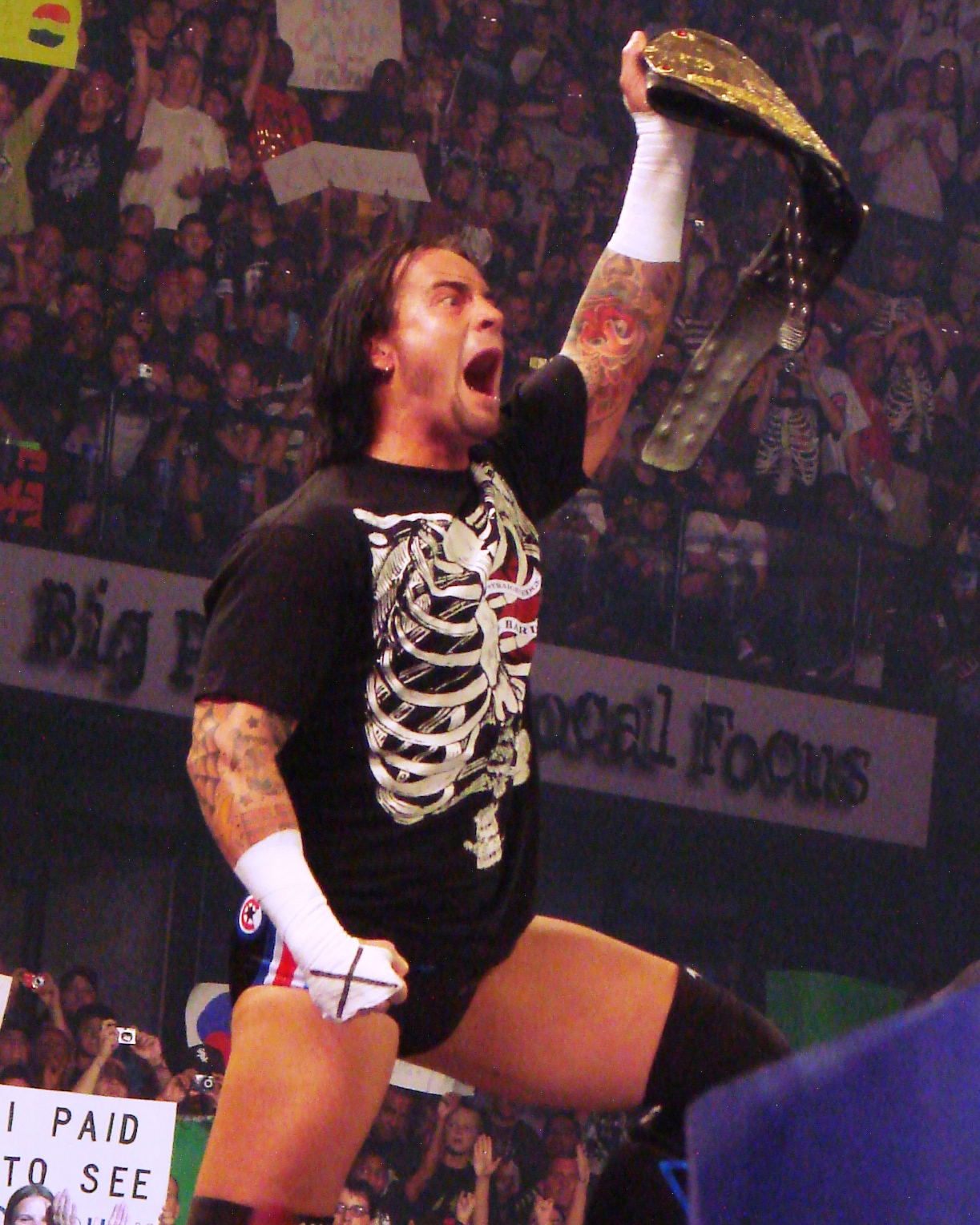
CM Punk became one of the most popular and high-profile wrestlers in the WWE during this period, and held a lengthy 434 day WWE Championship reign.

In the summer of 2008, WWE began distancing itself from the edgier content of years past, going with a more conservative approach. On July 22, 2008, all WWE programming transitioned to a PG television rating, with the 2008 SummerSlam event being the first pay-per-view event held under PG ratings. Although the SmackDown-brand TV shows were always held under TV-PG ratings since inception in 1999, in 2008, Raw TV shows, which were broadcast in TV-14 ratings, started to be broadcast under TV-PG ratings. While fans would dub this the "PG Era" early on, references from wrestlers themselves would come later such as Triple H in his "Thy Kingdom Come" documentary and Natalya on an episode of "Table for 3". Another notable example was that John Cena's famous finishing move, the F-U, was renamed Attitude Adjustment. Intentionally blading, which was common until then, became forbidden in the WWE. John Cena remained the top star of the company during this era. Newcomers Sheamus and Alberto del Rio also registered notable success during this period, winning the WWE Championship in the years 2009 and 2011, respectively. Another notable new superstar Drew McIntyre won the Intercontinental Championship in 2009.

Also in 2009, D-Generation X was reunited by Triple H and Shawn Michaels to feud with the villainous stable The Legacy a group consisting of Cody Rhodes, Ted DiBiase Jr. and their leader Randy Orton. D-Generation X would later win the unified WWE tag team titles from Chris Jericho and The Big Show in a Tables, Ladders and Chairs match. A rivalry between CM Punk and Jeff Hardy in 2009 over Hardy's real-life drug addiction issues received critical acclaim, and after Punk forced Hardy to storyline quit the WWE, Punk would form the villainous stable Straight Edge Society that would feud with fan-favorite Rey Mysterio throughout 2010.

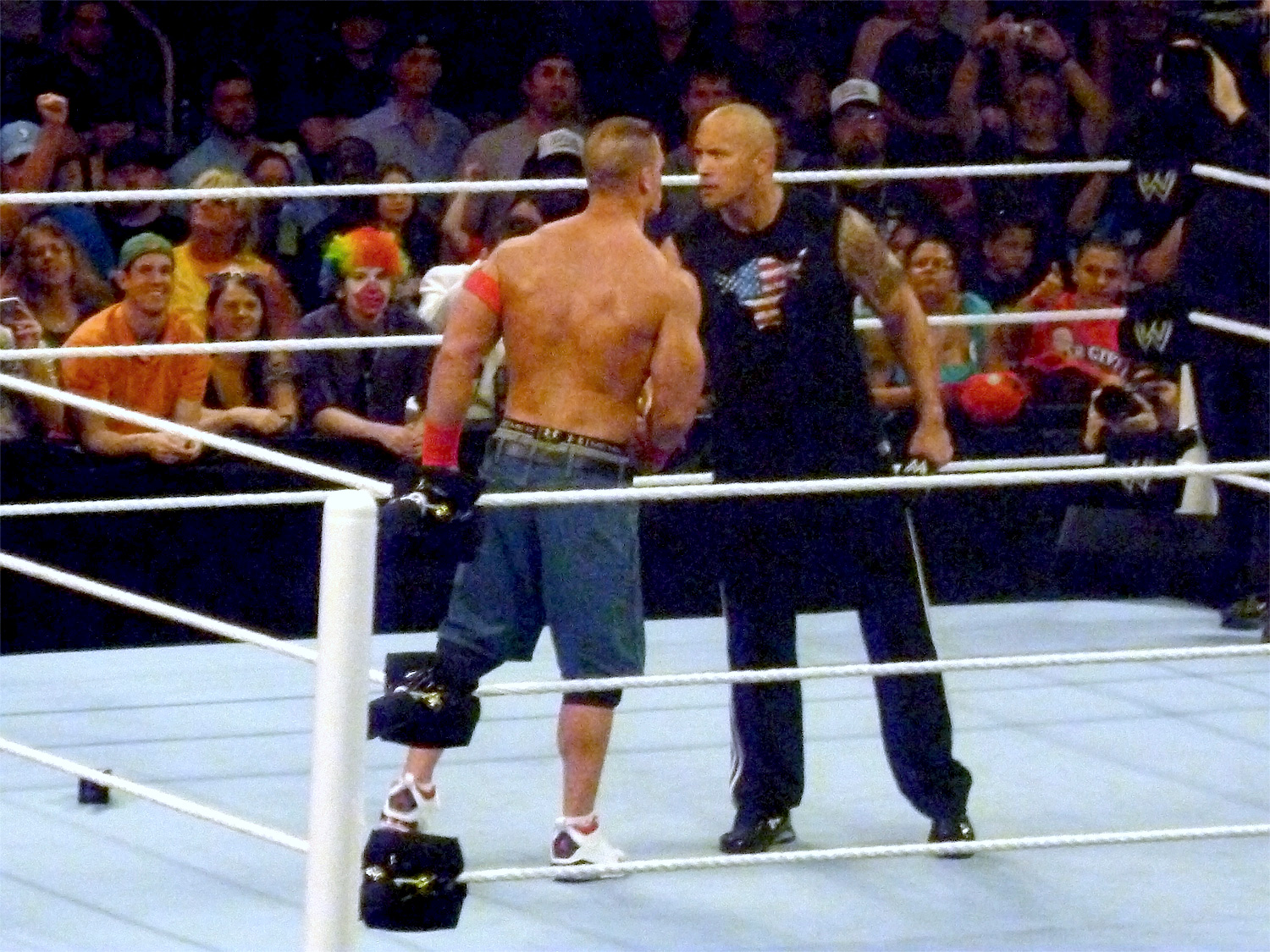
John Cena (left) and The Rock (right) on the April 04, 2011 episode of Raw, they had an on and off cross-generational feud between 2011 and 2013.

At WrestleMania XXVI in 2010, veteran wrestler Shawn Michaels retired following a loss to The Undertaker. In August 2011, WWE began to phase out the brand extension when they gave Raw the tagline "SuperShow", meaning wrestlers could appear on both Raw and SmackDown.

The year 2011 saw a highly acclaimed feud between the company's two most high-profile wrestlers at that point, John Cena and CM Punk. Their match at Money in the Bank on July 17, 2011, was named one of the greatest matches in WWE history, a match Punk won. Punk, who had become a top star during the summer of 2011 due to his infamous "pipe bomb" promo, would win the WWE Championship at the 2011 Survivor Series event and hold it for 434 days before losing to The Rock in 2013 at the 2013 Royal Rumble. CM Punk's reign was recognized by WWE as the longest WWE Championship reign in 25 years.

The Rock held the championship until he was defeated by John Cena at WrestleMania 29 in a rematch from their bout the previous year. Popular stable The Shield was prominently featured during this period, being involved in various high-profile storylines. On December 15, 2013, the World Heavyweight Championship and WWE Championship were unified in a Tables, Ladders and Chairs match between John Cena and Randy Orton, which Orton won and the unified championship was briefly called the WWE World Heavyweight Championship, but would soon be renamed as just the WWE Championship.

==== Launch of NXT (2010) ====
On February 23, 2010, WWE launched a new program on Syfy called NXT. The premise of the show was a reality-like show which saw eight new stars (Rookies) being mentored by wrestlers from the main roster (Pros), and ran for just over three months, with the last episode of the first season being on June 1, 2010. The winner of the season was Wade Barrett, mentored by Chris Jericho. Six days after the end of the first season, the rookies, now calling themselves The Nexus, interfered in the Raw main event match between John Cena and CM Punk, attacking both wrestlers and the announcers, before dismantling the ring area and surrounding equipment. During the segment, Daniel Bryan strangled ring announcer Justin Roberts with a tie, which WWE reportedly felt was too violent for their family-friendly programming. As a consequence, WWE (legitimately) released Bryan from his contract.

Bryan was later rehired due to fans' outrage over his firing and joined Team WWE against Team Nexus in the 2010 SummerSlam event in a 7-on-7 elimination tag team match, which Team WWE won. NXT lasted for a further three complete seasons, which were won respectively by Kaval, Kaitlyn, and Johnny Curtis. A fifth season, dubbed NXT Redemption, featuring former NXT participants, quietly ended with Derrick Bateman being the sole remaining participant. Eventually, the show morphed into both a television show and WWE's new official developmental territory, replacing Florida Championship Wrestling. NXT had been based at Full Sail University in Orlando, Florida from 2012 to 2020. In fall 2020, NXT left Full Sail and moved their home base to the WWE Performance Center, also in Orlando. From October 2019 until September 2021, NXT was promoted as WWE's third main brand alongside Raw and SmackDown, but in September 2021, it was reset as "NXT 2.0", resuming its role as a developmental brand. One year later, the "2.0" branding was removed.

=== Reality Era (2014–2016) ===
The official and currently in use WWE logo from 2014

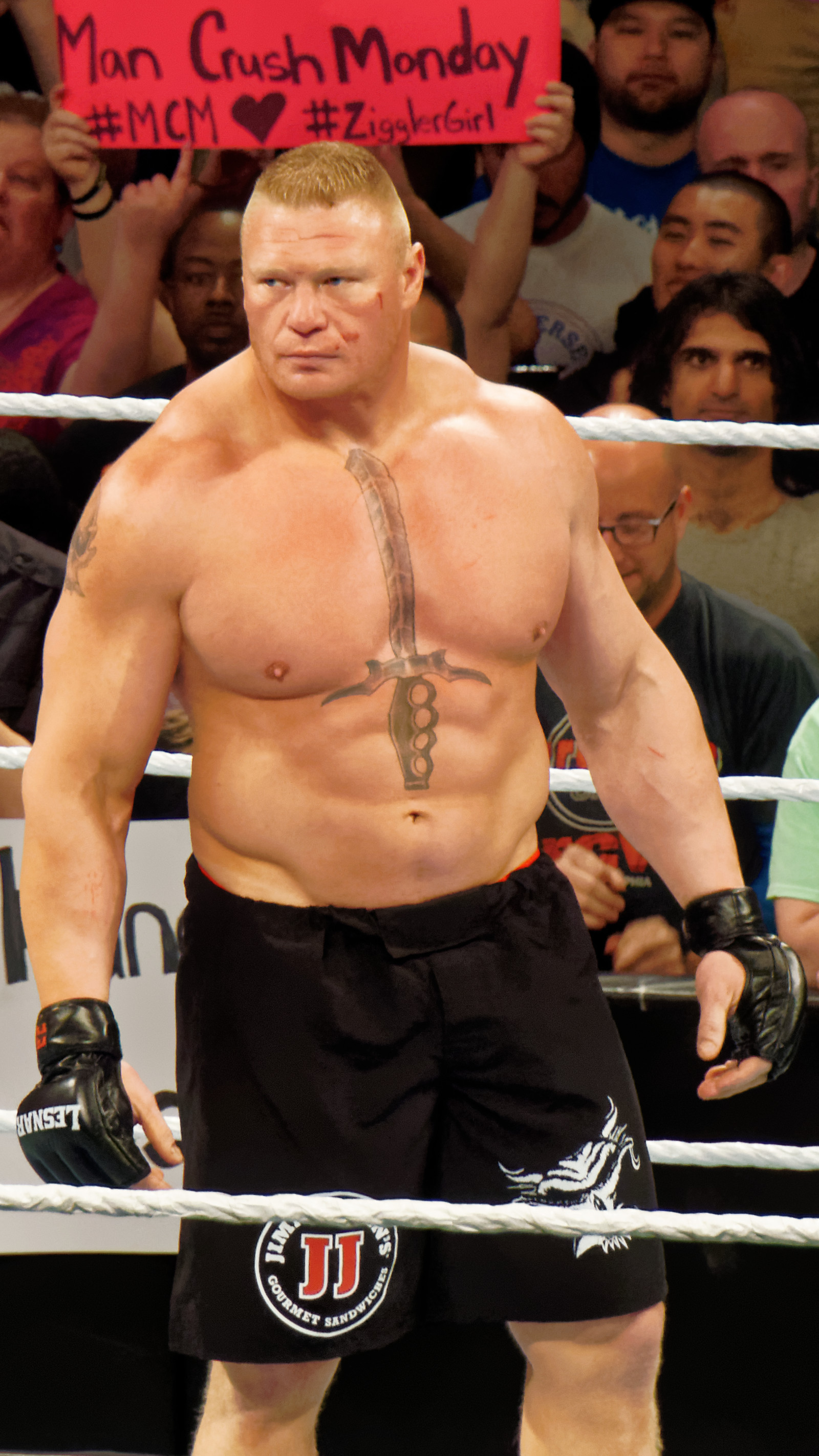
Brock Lesnar broke The Undertaker's undefeated Wrestlemania streak. Lesnar would be presented as one of the most dominant wrestlers ever during this period.

In 2013, Daniel Bryan became one of the most popular wrestlers in the company. On several occasions, fans would begin hijacking segments in which Bryan was either not involved in, or involved only secondarily, with his "Yes!" chant. The night after the 2014 Royal Rumble, CM Punk quit WWE due to feeling mistreated by officials within the company, while also dealing with a misdiagnosed staph infection. Meanwhile, fan outrage over the misuse of Bryan's character resulted in an unplanned change for the WrestleMania XXX main event. On the March 24, 2014 episode of Raw, Bryan's rival at the time, Triple H, dubbed this point in WWE as "The Reality Era". Bryan would eventually be inserted into the main event of WrestleMania, defeating Randy Orton and Batista in a critically acclaimed triple threat match, and capture the WWE World Heavyweight Championship in the process. Also at WrestleMania XXX, The Undertaker was defeated for the first time at the event by Brock Lesnar, following 21 consecutive victories dating back to 1991.

Brock Lesnar would then go on to defeat John Cena at SummerSlam to win the WWE World Heavyweight Championship. This was seen as the end of Cena's position as the face of WWE, a position Cena had held since 2005. Lesnar would go on to be featured as the most dominant wrestler of this era. The introduction of the WWE Network and the WWE Performance Center were also major breakthroughs during this period. On a "Stone Cold Podcast" episode that aired on the WWE Network in 2015, Triple H and Stone Cold Steve Austin both stated that "kayfabe has died" in modern WWE. Triple H also acknowledged that fans nowadays are more knowledgeable about the behind-the-scenes workings of WWE, as well as have more influence on the company than ever before.

The triple threat match at the 2015 Royal Rumble event between Seth Rollins, John Cena, and Brock Lesnar received critical acclaim and was widely recognized as one of the best matches of the year. The WWE United States Championship Open Challenge match between the Champion John Cena and challenger Cesaro on the July 6, 2015 edition of Raw was also widely praised as one of the best matches in Raw history and was awarded the Slammy award for the best United States Championship open challenge match by the WWE.

WCW legend Sting, who had previously been dubbed the "greatest wrestler to never wrestle in WWE", made his debut at the 2014 Survivor Series and had his first-ever match in WWE at WrestleMania 31 against Triple H, a match he would lose. Also at WrestleMania 31, Seth Rollins became the first person to cash in a Money in the Bank contract at WrestleMania when he did so during the main event match between Brock Lesnar and Roman Reigns for the WWE Championship turning it into a triple threat match, with Rollins successfully winning the title. The event has since then been famously dubbed "the heist of the century" in the WWE. WrestleMania 32 in Arlington, Texas (billed as Dallas) garnered the largest crowd to ever attend a WWE event, surpassing a disputed 100,000 attendees. In the main event, Roman Reigns defeated Triple H to capture the WWE World Heavyweight Championship despite a segment of the WWE fans pushing back on Reigns' push from the company in the lead-up. The Authority officially disbanded on May 1, 2016.

=== New Era (2016–2021) ===
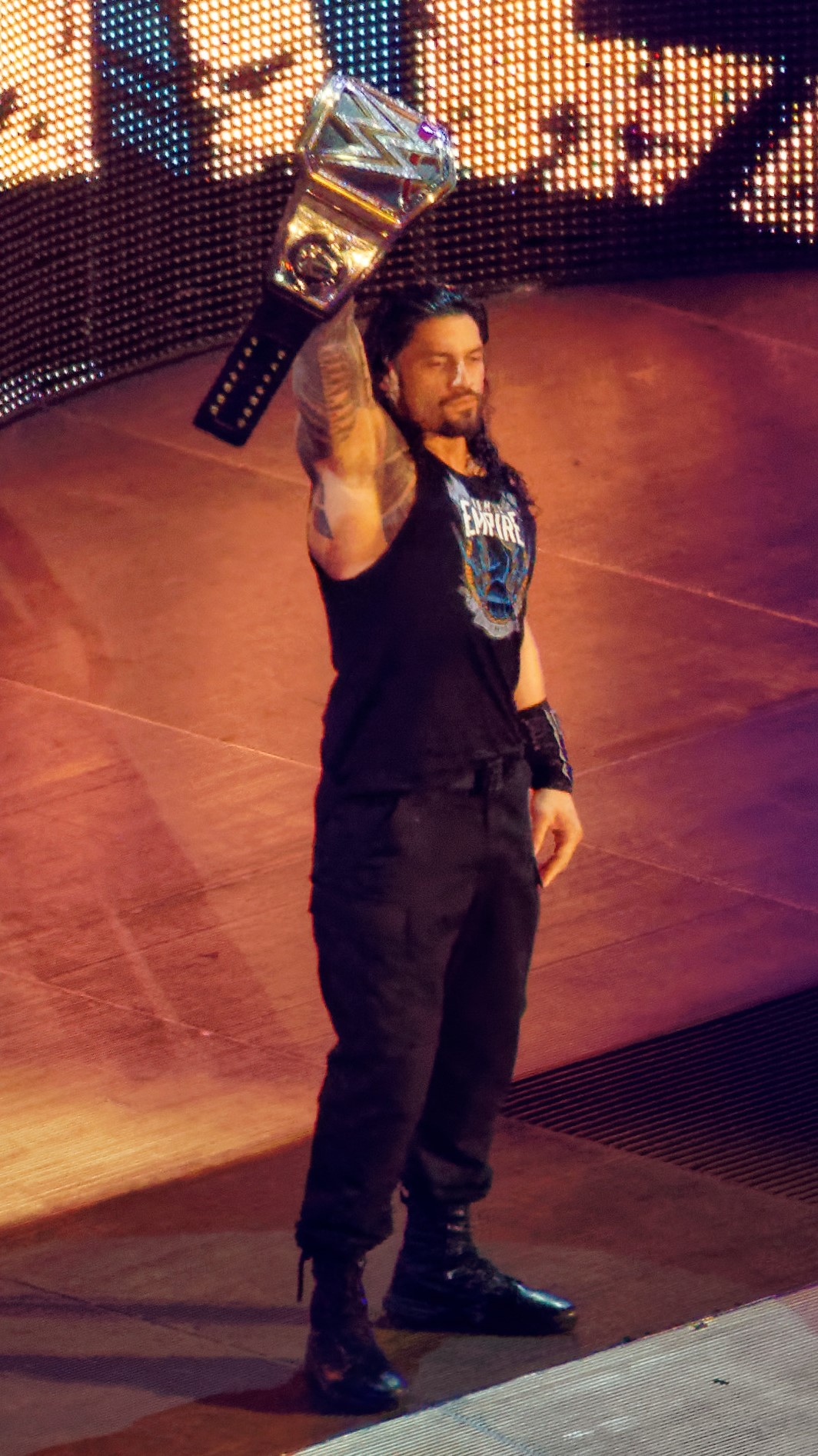
Roman Reigns was considered the face of the men's division during the new era having main evented WWE's flagship event WrestleMania multiple times as well as winning the WWE Championship and WWE Universal Championship multiple times during this time frame.

The 2016 Payback event, held on May 1, 2016, was billed as the start of a "New Era". In the main event, Roman Reigns would retain the WWE World Heavyweight Championship against AJ Styles. Reigns would go on to be prominently featured throughout this era. In July 2016, WWE launched a roster split, similar to the one in 2002. The three former members of The Shield – Dean Ambrose, Roman Reigns, and Seth Rollins – have heavily featured since the start of the New Era, with all three men exchanging the WWE World Heavyweight Championship at Money in the Bank in June 2016. While the WWE World Championship was assigned to the SmackDown brand, the new WWE Universal Championship was introduced for the Raw brand, with Finn Bálor becoming the inaugural champion at the August 21, 2016 SummerSlam event after defeating Seth Rollins.

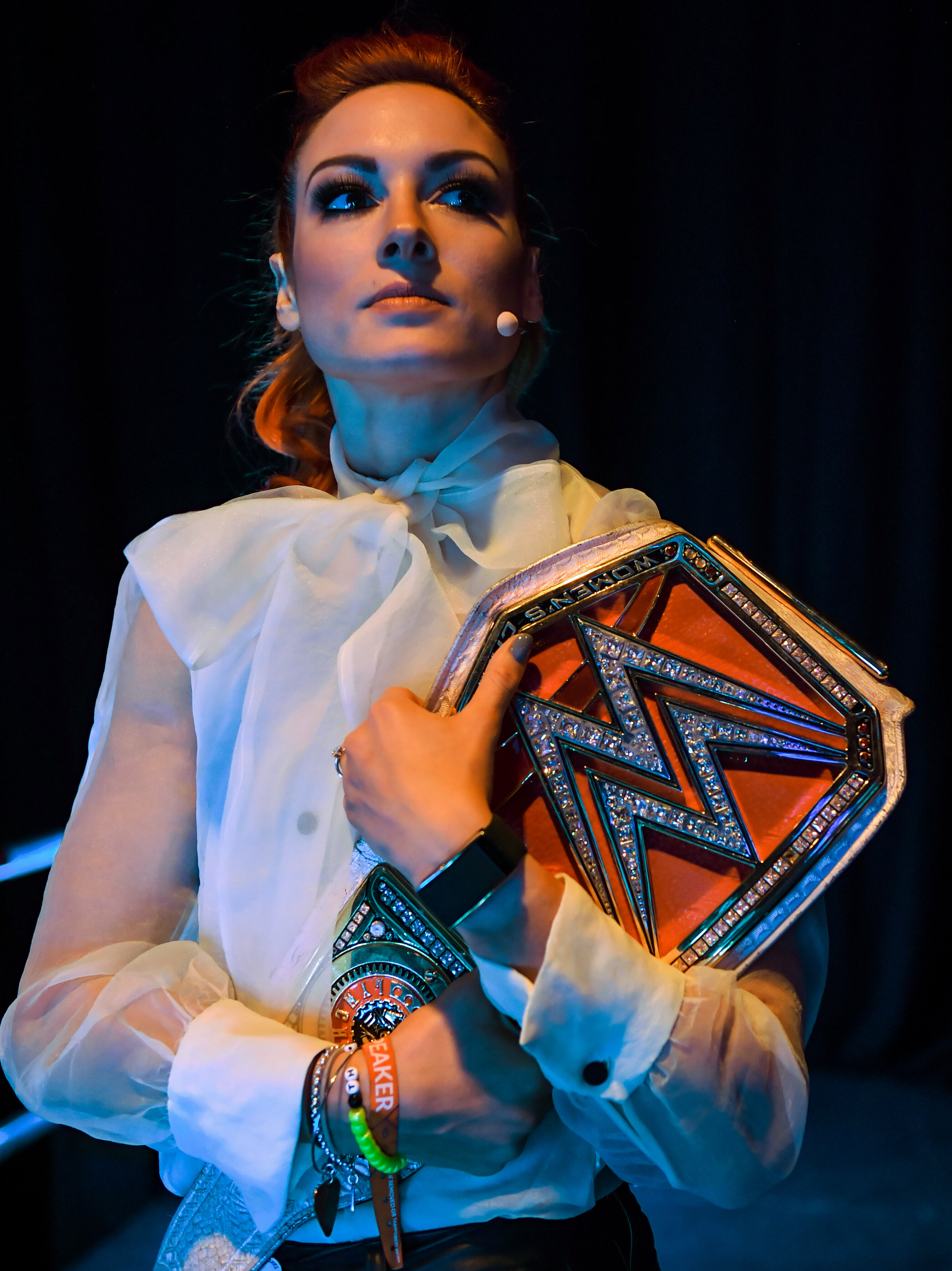
Becky Lynch emerged as one of the biggest stars during that period. She along with Charlotte Flair and Ronda Rousey, made history in 2019 by becoming the first women to main event a WrestleMania at WrestleMania 35.

The Divas division was rebranded as the Women's division and the company introduced a new WWE Women's Championship and retired the former Divas Championship. Female wrestlers also began receiving more air time for their matches, and began receiving as much spotlight as their male colleagues, thus the "New era" has been credited as being the start of the "women's evolution." On the Raw-branded Hell in a Cell pay-per-view event in 2016, Charlotte Flair and Sasha Banks made history being in the first WWE pay-per-view event main-evented by women and participating in the first-ever women's Hell in a Cell match.

Women started to participate in matches that, before then, were male-only, like the Money in the Bank, Royal Rumble, and Elimination Chamber. On October 28, 2018, WWE held their first all-women pay per view, WWE Evolution, which saw a highly acclaimed last woman standing match between Becky Lynch and Charlotte Flair, which Lynch won. At this point, Becky Lynch started referring to herself as "The Man", becoming one of the most popular stars. This culminated at WrestleMania 35, where three women, Becky Lynch, Charlotte Flair, and Ronda Rousey main-evented the PPV, with Becky Lynch winning the match. This would be the first time in history that WrestleMania would be main evented by women. In another notable occurrence at WrestleMania 35, Kofi Kingston became the first African born WWE Champion by defeating Daniel Bryan at the event.

At NXT TakeOver: WarGames (2017), popular WCW gimmick match the WarGames match made its return after 17 years when The Undisputed Era (Adam Cole, Kyle O'Reilly and Bobby Fish) defeated The Authors of Pain (Akam, Rezar and Roderick Strong) and SAni†Y (Alexander Wolfe, Eric Young, and Killian Dain) in a well received WarGames match. In 2018 WWE received criticisms for holding major shows in Saudi Arabia due to human rights violations there.

WWE would go on to establish Braun Strowman as one of the biggest stars of the company in 2017 after he attacked and injured Reigns during an interview on Raw. Strowman went on to beat down other wrestlers on the roster and have a decisive victory over Reigns at Payback on April 30. Top wrestler John Cena became a part-timer around this time and lost to Roman Reigns in what is considered as a "passing the torch match" at the 2017 No Mercy event on September 24. Popular stable The New Day would also register notable success, becoming a record 11-time tag team champions in the company under the Freebird rule. The New Day and The Shield faced off at the 2017 Survivor Series event, a match the Shield won. Shield member Dean Ambrose left the WWE in 2019. Their final match together was featured in the special event The Shield's Final Chapter.

WrestleMania 36 became the first WrestleMania to be taped with no attendance, as opposed to airing live, due to the COVID-19 pandemic. It was shown on two nights of April 4 and April 5 respectively. In the main event of Night 1, The Undertaker defeated AJ Styles in a Boneyard match, which was well-praised, and later in November 2020 confirmed to be Undertaker's final match. In the main event of Night 2, Drew McIntyre defeated Brock Lesnar for the WWE Championship in a match critically panned for its short length. Despite having no attendance due to the circumstances, WrestleMania 36 was the most-viewed event in WWE history, with a record 967 million views combining both nights across the company's digital and social platforms. On July 2, 2020, the WWE purchased rival turned partnered-wrestling promotion Evolve and acquired all their wrestling talents and rights. WWE held the inaugural NXT TakeOver: Stand & Deliver April 7 and April 8, 2021, as a two-night event.

==== COVID-19 and the ThunderDome (2020–2021) ====
In March 2020, WWE began to be impacted by the American onset of the coronavirus (COVID-19) pandemic. The March 11 episode of NXT was filmed without spectators at the WWE Performance Center facility in Orlando, as three of the four major sports leagues two days earlier had closed locker rooms to the media as a precautionary measure. As other sports cancellations and postponements followed, WWE, beginning with the March 13 episode of SmackDown, started filming its weekly programs at the Performance Center with no spectators and only essential staff present. Major pay per view events including WrestleMania 36 have been aired taped without any attendance as opposed to being aired live. NXT continued to air from Full Sail University, but under similar restrictions. The highly advertised NXT TakeOver: In Your House aired taped in June 2020, however certain WWE officials were used as part of a very limited crowd for the event.

Live broadcasts returned on April 13, with the existing arrangements continuing; WWE stated to ESPN.com that "we believe it is now more important than ever to provide people with a diversion from these hard times", and that the company's programming "bring[s] families together and deliver a sense of hope, determination and perseverance". It was subsequently reported that Florida Governor Ron DeSantis had deemed WWE a business critical to the state's economy, and had added an exception under the state's stay-at-home order for employees of a "professional sports and media production" that is closed to the public and has a national audience. The decision was met with criticism from media outlets, with several media outlets pointing out that DeSantis' actions happened on the same day a pro-Donald Trump political action committee led Linda McMahon, who was previously a part of Trump's cabinet, pledged to spend $18.5 million in advertising in Florida, and that, also on the same day, Vince McMahon was named part of an advisory group created by Trump to devise a strategy in re-launching US economy.

On April 15, WWE implemented a series of cuts and layoffs in response to the pandemic, including releasing a number of personnel. WWE executives also took a pay cut, and the company also suspended construction on its new headquarters for at least six months. The firings released significant backlash with both fans; with Business Insider calling them "livid". Both fans and several media outlets pointed out that while WWE called these actions "necessary due to the economic impact of the coronavirus pandemic", the company also claimed to have "substantial financial resources. Available cash and debt capacity currently total approximately $0.5 billion". DeSantis labeled WWE "essential", which meant that the company's revenues loss would be limited. Beginning in August, WWE moved its events to a new virtual crowd and arena staging, a bio-secure bubble called the WWE ThunderDome. The ThunderDome allowed fans to attend events virtually for free and be seen on the nearly 1,000 LED boards within the arena. WrestleMania 37, held in April 2021, would be WWE's first major event to be held outside of the ThunderDome and with live fans allowed back in the arena, though to a limited capacity, with the tagline "Back in Business!", the event being held over two nights with a disputed combined attendance of 51,350 people. The period between the start of the pandemic and before WrestleMania 37 has sometimes been referred as the "ThunderDome Era".

=== Post-COVID-19 period (2021–2023) ===
With COVID-19 restrictions being gradually lifted during the first half of 2021, WWE returned to having live crowds. For WrestleMania 37, which took place April 10 and 11, 2021, paying fans - albeit at reduced capacity - attended the event from Raymond James Stadium in Tampa, Florida, and the two night show was promoted as WWE being "Back in Business!". Bobby Lashley who left the WWE in 2008 and came back to WWE after a decade in 2018 won the WWE Championship in 2021 and defeated Drew McIntyre on night 1 of WrestleMania 37 to retain the title. Bianca Belair became a dominant star in the women's division in 2021, after she won the 2021 Women's Royal Rumble match and defeated Sasha Banks in the main event of Night 1 of WrestleMania 37 to win the SmackDown Women's Championship. On the April 30, 2021 episode of WWE SmackDown, fan-favorite wrestler Daniel Bryan lost to Roman Reigns in a championship vs. career match for the Universal Championship and subsequently left the WWE. WWE NXT was revamped with major changes to "NXT 2.0" starting from the September 14, 2021. WWE would resume full time live touring with full capacity crowds on July 17, with the live broadcast of SmackDown from Dickies Arena in Fort Worth, Texas, followed the next night by the Money in the Bank pay-per-view in the same venue.

At Night 1 of WrestleMania 38 in April 2022, veteran Stone Cold Steve Austin came out of retirement after 19 years for a one-time-only match defeating Kevin Owens. The following night on Night 2 of WrestleMania 38 in the main event Roman Reigns defeated Brock Lesnar in a Winner Takes All match for the WWE Championship and WWE Universal Championship, becoming the first wrestler ever to hold both titles together at the same time. WWE also began heavily pushing Cody Rhodes and Rhea Ripley during this time, having them win the 2023 Men's and Women's Royal Rumble matches respectively. While Ripley defeated Charlotte Flair to win the SmackDown Women's Championship at night one WrestleMania 39, Rhodes was defeated by Roman Reigns in the main event Undisputed WWE Universal Championship match at night 2 of WrestleMania 39. WrestleMania 39 also became the highest grossing WWE event of all time as of 2023. At Night of Champions in 2023 Seth Rollins defeated AJ Styles in a tournament final to become the inaugural winner of the newly established World Heavyweight Championship. On September 2, 2023, WWE held Payback their final pay-per-view prior to transfer of ownership, in the main event of which Seth Rollins defeated Shinsuke Nakamura to retain his World Heavyweight Championship.

==== Leadership changes (2022–2023) ====
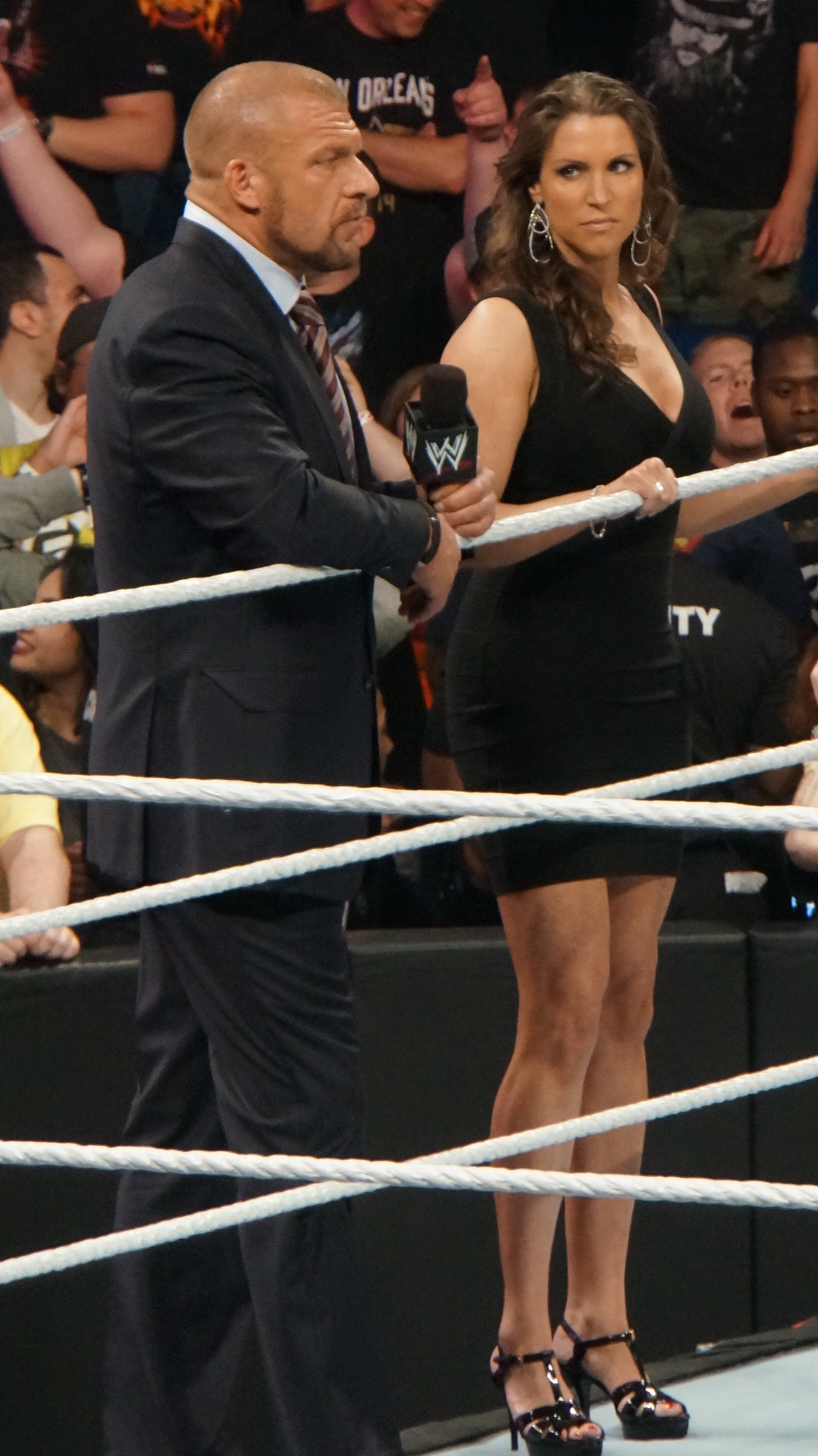
Triple H (real name Paul Michael Levesque) and Stephanie McMahon

On June 17, 2022, amidst an investigation by WWE's Board of Directors into reported "hush money" paid to a former employee by Vince McMahon following an affair, Mr. McMahon stepped down as chairman and CEO of WWE and was replaced by his daughter, Stephanie McMahon, as the interim chairwoman and CEO of WWE. Despite the change Vince McMahon came out on WWE SmackDown that night opening the show with a brief speech, the highlights of which "then, now, forever and most importantly together" was quoted by various news media as Vince letting people know that he is still in creative control from behind the scenes. On July 22, 2022, Vince McMahon officially retired on Twitter, saying, "At 77, time for me to retire. Thank you, WWE Universe. Then. Now. Forever. Together." Following Vince's retirement, Stephanie McMahon was officially named chairwoman while she and Nick Khan were named Co-CEO of WWE. Triple H would take over as head of creative, while resuming his position as Executive Vice President of Talent Relations. Commentators have highlighted the significance of Vince McMahon's retirement, saying that it marks the start of a new period in WWE's history. The 2022 SummerSlam event held on July 30, 2022, was the first WWE pay-per-view event to be held under the leadership of Stephanie McMahon and Triple H.

On August 18, 2022; WWE Hall of Famer Shawn Michaels was promoted to WWE Vice President of Talent Development Creative. On September 6, 2022, WWE promoted Paul Levesque ('Triple H') to Chief Content Officer. On January 6, 2023, Vince McMahon stated his intention of returning to the company ahead of media rights negotiations. WWE's media rights with Fox and USA Network are set to expire in 2024. That same month, JP Morgan were hired to handle a possible sale of the company, with companies such as Comcast (owners of NBCUniversal and long-time partners of WWE), Fox Corp (broadcaster of SmackDown), Disney (owners of ESPN), Warner Bros. Discovery (broadcasters of rival promotion AEW), Netflix, Amazon, Endeavor Group Holdings (owners of UFC), and Liberty Media being in the speculation for buying the company with CAA and Saudi Arabia's Public Investment Fund also on the list. On January 10, 2023, Stephanie McMahon resigned as chairwoman and co-CEO. On the same day Vince McMahon assumed the role of executive Chairman of the WWE while Nick Khan became the sole CEO of the WWE.

==== Acquisition of WWE by Endeavor (2023) ====
On April 3, 2023; WWE and Endeavor reached a deal under which WWE would merge with UFC's parent company Endeavor to form a new company, which would go public on the New York Stock Exchange (NYSE) under the symbol "TKO". Endeavor came to hold a 51% stake in "TKO", with WWE's shareholders having a 49% stake, valuing WWE at $9.1 billion. This marked the first time that WWE has not been majority-controlled by the McMahon family.

Vince McMahon served as executive chairman of the new entity, Endeavor CEO Ari Emanuel becoming CEO, with Mark Shapiro as president and chief operating officer. Emanuel did not take on any creative roles with WWE's head of creative Paul Levesque expected to remain in his role, and with Nick Khan becoming president of WWE post-merger (not unlike Dana White's role as president of UFC). The deal additionally granted McMahon life tenure as executive chairman, the right to nominate five WWE representatives on the 11 member board, as well as veto rights over certain actions by the new company. In addition, McMahon will own 34% of the new company, with a 16% voting interest. Emanuel stated that this merger would "bring together two leading pureplay sports and entertainment companies" and provide "significant operating synergies". Vince McMahon stated that "family businesses have to evolve for all the right reasons", and that "given the incredible work that Ari and Endeavor have done to grow the UFC brand — nearly doubling its revenue over the past seven years — and the immense success we've already had in partnering with their team on a number of ventures, I believe that this is without a doubt the best outcome for our shareholders and other stakeholders."

== TKO ==
=== WWE under Endeavor after the formation of TKO (2023–present) ===
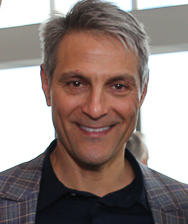
Ari Emanuel, the CEO of Endeavor, is the Founder and CEO of TKO Group Holdings of which UFC and WWE are MMA and professional wrestling divisions of respectively.

The merger between WWE and UFC into TKO Group Holdings (TKO) was completed on September 12, 2023. WWE thereafter operated as an autonomous professional wrestling subsidiary of TKO, though now organized as a limited liability company under the adjusted legal name "World Wrestling Entertainment, LLC". The first WWE show under the Endeavor regime was the September 12, 2023 episode of NXT which opened with Ilja Dragunov defeating Wes Lee in a singles match, and in the main event Becky Lynch defeated Tiffany Stratton to win the NXT Women's Championship. The first WWE pay per view under TKO was NXT No Mercy on September 30, 2023. Popular wrestler CM Punk returned to WWE in late 2023 and in his first match upon return he defeated Dominik Mysterio at WWE MSG Show on December 26, 2023.

On January 23, 2024, Dwayne Johnson, also known as "The Rock" joined the TKO Group Holdings board of directors. Three days later on January 26, Vince McMahon once again resigned due to further sexual misconduct allegations, with Ari Emanuel obtaining greater control as the new Chairman of TKO. On April 1, 2024, Triple H stated that WWE had entered "another era". On April 3, WWE wrestler Cody Rhodes coined the term "Renaissance Era" for the period. At WrestleMania XL, the WWE would officially debut a new signature intro ahead of the event's first match. Paul "Triple H" Levesque would introduce the fans in attendance, “Welcome to a new time, welcome to a new era,” and at the WrestleMania's second night Stephanie McMahon would reiterate this, referring to it as the "Paul Levesque era”. On April 7, in the main event of the second and final night of the event, Cody Rhodes defeated Roman Reigns to win the Undisputed WWE Universal Championship in a title unification match continuing the lineage of the WWE Championship. On May 4, 2024, WWE held Backlash France, their first ever pay-per-view event in France.

On January 23, 2024, WWE announced that WWE Raw will move to Netflix streaming service in January 2025, while also providing behind-the-scenes series. On October 29, WWE announced the launch of their own independent wrestling development program named WWE ID, short for WWE Independent Development. In 2024, WWE began a wider talent exchange with Total Nonstop Action Wrestling (TNA). Several TNA wrestlers would make appearances on NXT's weekly television series and livestreaming events and vice versa. A multi-year partnership between Total Nonstop Action Wrestling (TNA) and WWE was officially announced on January 16, 2025. WWE also formed partnerships with Pro Wrestling Noah and Dream Star Fighting Marigold. On April 19, 2025, before the start of WrestleMania 41, it was announced that WWE had acquired Lucha Libre AAA Worldwide in conjunction with Fillip, a Mexican sports and entertainment company, as part of WWE's global expansion. The sale was expected to close on the third quarter of 2025.

== Other ==
=== Death of Owen Hart ===
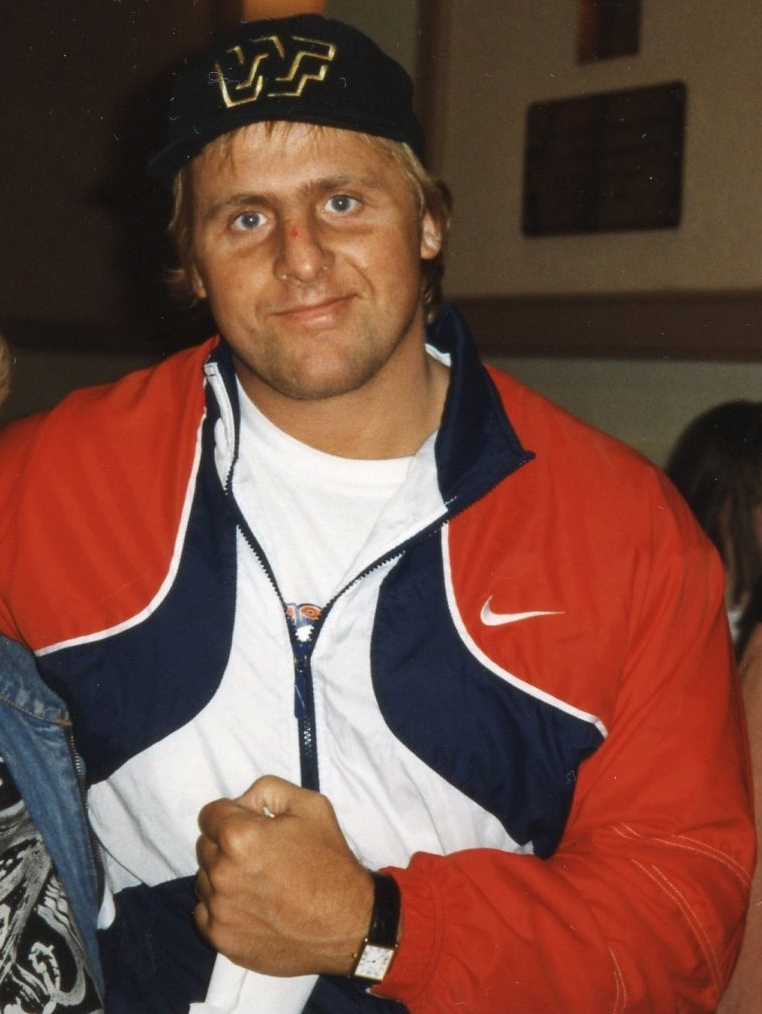
Owen Hart

On May 23, 1999, Owen Hart fell to his death in Kansas City, Missouri during the Over the Edge pay-per-view event. Hart was in the process of being lowered via harness and grapple line into the ring from the rafters of Kemper Arena for a booked Intercontinental Championship match against The Godfather. In keeping with his Blue Blazer's new "buffoonish superhero" character, he was to begin a dramatic entrance, being lowered to just above ring level, at which time he would act "entangled", then release himself from the safety harness and fall flat on his face for comedic effect—this necessitated the use of a quick release mechanism. It was an elaboration on a Blue Blazer stunt done previously on the Sunday Night Heat before Survivor Series in 1998. While being lowered into the ring, Hart fell 78 feet (24 m), landing chest-first on the top rope (approximately a foot from the nearest turnbuckle), throwing him into the ring.

Hart had performed the stunt only a few times before. Hart's widow Martha has suggested that, by moving around to get comfortable with both the harness and his cape on, Hart unintentionally triggered an early release. Television viewers did not see the incident. Moments after the fall, a pre-taped vignette was being shown on the pay-per-view broadcast as well as on the monitors in the darkened arena. Afterward, while Hart was being worked on by medical personnel inside the ring, the live event's broadcast showed only the audience. Meanwhile, WWF television announcer Jim Ross repeatedly told those watching live on pay-per-view that what had just transpired was not a wrestling angle or storyline and that Hart was hurt badly, emphasizing the seriousness of the situation. Hart was transported to Truman Medical Center in Kansas City. While several attempts to revive him were made, he died from his injuries; some believe he died in the ring. The cause of death was later revealed to be internal bleeding from blunt force trauma.

=== Legends program and the WWE Hall of Fame ===
The Legends program began informally with the return of the WWE Hall of Fame ceremony in 2004, held annually during WrestleMania weekends. The introduction of WWE 24/7, WWE's on-demand television service, the WWE Network, WWE's over-the-top streaming service and the success of career retrospective home video releases such as The Ultimate Ric Flair Collection, Roddy Piper: Born to Controversy, and Brian Pillman: Loose Cannon have ingrained WWE's modern product with a sense of heritage, and allows a new generation of wrestling fans to witness matches and events they may only previously have heard of. WWE will also offer a select group of former or retired WWE wrestlers, billing them publicly as "WWE Legends", contracts to make periodic appearances—either on WWE TV or for promotional events—and to serve as "Ambassadors" (public representatives/spokespeople) for the company.

=== Chris Benoit's murder–suicide ===
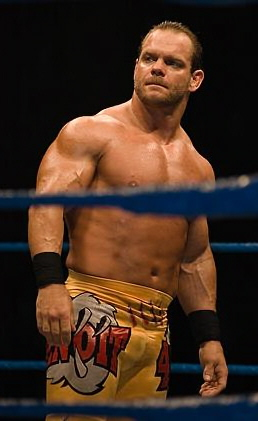
Chris Benoit

On June 25, 2007, the Fayette County Police notified WWE around 4:15 p.m., informing them that they had discovered the bodies of Chris, Nancy, and their seven-year-old son Daniel Benoit at their home in Fayette County, Georgia, and the house was now ruled as a "major crime scene". WWE canceled the scheduled three-hour-long live Raw show on June 25 (which, coincidentally, was supposed to be a scripted memorial for the Mr. McMahon character), and replaced the broadcast version with a tribute to his life and career, featuring past matches, segments from the Hard Knocks: The Chris Benoit Story DVD, and comments from wrestlers and announcers from the Raw, SmackDown! and the now-defunct ECW brands. Shortly after the program aired, many of the aired comments were posted on WWE.com. It was not until the program was nearly over that reports surfaced that police were working under the belief that Benoit murdered his wife and son before killing himself over a three-day period.

The next night, after some of the details of the deaths became available, the company aired a recorded statement by its chairman Vince McMahon before their ECW broadcast:

Good evening, ladies and gentlemen. Last night on Monday Night Raw, the WWE presented a special tribute show recognizing the career of Chris Benoit. However, now some 26 hours later, the facts of this horrific tragedy are now apparent. Therefore, other than my comments, there will be no mention of Mr. Benoit's name tonight. On the contrary, tonight's show will be dedicated to everyone who has been affected by this terrible incident. This evening marks the first step of the healing process. Tonight, WWE performers will do what they do better than anyone else in the world: entertain you.

Following the double-murder suicide committed by Chris Benoit, the United States House Committee on Oversight and Government Reform began investigating WWE regarding their Wellness policy. After Benoit's death, WWE began to tone down the violence, swearing and sexual content of their product. Furthermore, after further deaths among WWE wrestlers were found (including Benoit's) to have been caused by chronic traumatic encephalopathy, which was an emerging study in brain injuries in sport, WWE legitimately banned chair shots to the head.

=== Social media and WWE HD ===
In January 2008, WWE began broadcasting in high-definition, beginning with the January 21 episode of Raw, while the 2008 Royal Rumble was the first pay-per-view event presented in HD. On November 19, 2008, WWE officially launched their online social network, WWE Universe. It opened in April as WWE Fan Nation, and adopted the name WWE Universe a few months later. The website was similar to MySpace, with blogs, forums, photos, videos, and other features. Despite a heightened popularity the site was shut down on January 1, 2011, and has since replaced with WWE InterAction. Since closing down their social media website, WWE has created accounts on social media websites such as Facebook, Twitter, YouTube, Tout, and Instagram, with executive vice president of digital media Perkins Miller stating that "social media is going to transform our company". In July 2012, WWE made an investment of $5 million into Tout, and a month later released an official app. In 2013, WWE's main Twitter account was cited as one of the top 25 most engaged brands on the website. In 2014, WWE launched WWE SuperCard, a trading card app game, which was downloaded 1.5 million times in the first week of its launch.

=== WWE Network ===
In September 2011, WWE made public plans to launch the WWE Network in time for WrestleMania XXVIII. WWE's official website featured a countdown clock that would have expired on April 1, 2012 however, the clock was quietly removed, and the network did not launch as advertised. At the Consumer Electronics Show on January 8, 2014, WWE announced the WWE Network would launch on February 24, 2014, in the United States. WWE called the network "the first-ever 24/7 streaming network". On February 27, 2014, the WWE Network aired its first live event, NXT Arrival, which featured three championship matches and a well-received match between Cesaro and Sami Zayn. Despite #CancelWWENetwork trending on social media in early 2015 after angry fans were upset with the booking of the 2015 Royal Rumble match, this did not prevent the Network from its continued growth, reaching 1 million subscribers the very same week.

==== Move to Peacock ====
In 2021, NBCUniversal Television and Streaming acquired the exclusive U.S. distribution rights to WWE Network, and that the service would be folded into the NBCUniversal-owned streaming service Peacock on March 18, 2021, ahead of the 2021 Fastlane event. Existing and future WWE Network content started to be hosted by a branded channel within the Peacock service starting with Fastlane, with the full service included as part of the paid Peacock Premium tier (which features a wider array of television, film, and sports programming), and a selection of unpopular WWE Network content (such as E! reality show Total Bellas) available within its free tier. WWE committed to produce a "signature documentary" for the service annually beginning in 2022.

After a transitional period, the standalone WWE Network ceased operations in the United States on April 4, 2021. Not all content was available at launch, as the service's library is being audited to meet NBCUniversal standards and practices. Due to Peacock's heavy censorship policy, the company began to achieve much criticism among the fans and critics alike, especially after Peacock's removal of some of the contents that were considered iconic moments of the Attitude Era that were deemed inappropriate by Peacock, these archived contents would no longer be available under any of WWE's authorized platforms. Peacock would also gain extensive control over WWE's newer contents making them more family-friendly and politically correct. Amdist the criticisms, in April 2021 WWE executive Triple H defended WWE's move to Peacock. After numerous technical difficulties in viewing Money in the Bank via Peacock in July 2021, several fans and critics called for WWE to cancel their partnership with Peacock.

=== Pink Ribbon campaigning ===
Starting in October 2012, WWE formed a partnership with Susan G. Komen for the Cure to promote breast cancer awareness. As part of the campaign, WWE adorned their sets with pink ribbons, put up a pink middle rope on the ring, filmed numerous PSAs, and sold special John Cena "Rise Above Cancer" merchandise. All of these efforts culminated in a donation from WWE of $1 million, which was presented to Susan G. Komen representatives in an in-ring ceremony during the October 29, 2012 episode of Raw. The campaign continued every year since, but caused controversy as the foundation has been accused of pinkwashing.

=== Backstage harassment ===
Throughout the late 2010s, notably in 2017 WWE became embroiled in scandals concerning the company allowing certain employees to harass others, such as Bill Demott and John "Bradshaw" Layfield. According to multiple sources including Dave Meltzer's Wrestling Observer, hazing is something which is encouraged by the higher ups in the company and has been going on since the company's inception.
