= Encke =

Encke may refer to:

- Johann Franz Encke (1791–1865), a nineteenth-century German astronomer
  - Encke (crater), a lunar crater
  - Encke Division, a dark gap in the rings of Saturn
  - Comet Encke, a short-period comet
    - Encke (horse) (2009–2014), a thoroughbred racehorse named after the comet
- Erdmann Encke (1843-1896), German sculptor

== See also ==
- Enka (disambiguation)
- Hencke, a surname
- Heinke (disambiguation)
