= Vincenza =

- Pronunciation: Italian: [vinˈtʃɛntsa]
- Gender: Female

Origin
- Origin: Latin
- Region of origin: Italy

Other names
- Nicknames: Enza, Cenza
- Related names: Vincenzo, Vincent

Vincenza is an Italian female given name. Notable people with the name include:

- Vincenza Armani, Italian actress
- Vincenza Bono Parrino, Italian politician
- Vincenza Calì, Italian track and field athlete
- Vincenza Carrieri-Russo, American model
- Vincenza Gerosa, Italian saint
- Vincenza Garelli della Morea, Italian pianist
- Vincenza Petrilli (born 1990), Italian paralympic archer
- Vincenza Sicari, Italian runner
- Sister Vincenza Taffarel, Italian nun
- Vincenza Matilde Testaferrata, Maltese baroness
- Vincenza Viganò-Mombelli, Italian ballerina

== See also ==
- Enza (given name)
