= Enzo (disambiguation) =

Enzo is an Italian given name.

Enzo may also refer to:

- Enzo (dog), a Jack Russell Terrier canine actor
- Enzo (film), a 2025 French coming-of-age drama film directed by Robin Campillo
- Enzo (song), a song by French producer DJ Snake and American rapper Sheck Wes
- Ferrari Enzo, a mid-engine sports car manufactured by Italian automobile manufacturer Ferrari

== See also ==
- Enza (disambiguation)
