= Enka (disambiguation) =

Enka or ENKA may refer to:

== Music ==
- Enka, a music genre popular in Japan
- Enka (album), a 2007 album of enka covers by Akina Nakamori
- "Enka" (song), a 2007 enka song by Akina Nakamori, the title track off the eponymous album Enka (album)

== Places ==
- Enka, North Carolina, USA; a town in Buncombe County
- ENKA Schools, a private school in Istanbul, Turkey
- Enka High School. Candler, North Carolina, USA

== Groups, organizations ==
- Enka Insaat ve Sanayi A.S. (stylized as ENKA), a Turkish construction conglomerate
- American Enka Company (stylized as ENKA), a US rayon manufacturer
- Enka (car), a Czech automobile manufacturer
- Enka BV, a former Dutch company, now Akzo Nobel
- Enka SK, Istanbul, Turkey; a sports club

== Other uses ==
- ENKA Open, a WTA Tour tennis tournament in Istanbul, Turkey
- Enka Challenger, an ATP Tour Challenger tennis event in Istanbul, Turkey

== See also ==
- G-Enka (born 1974), Estonian rapper
- Enca (disambiguation)
- Encke (disambiguation)
