= Enca (singer) =

Albanian singer (born 1995)

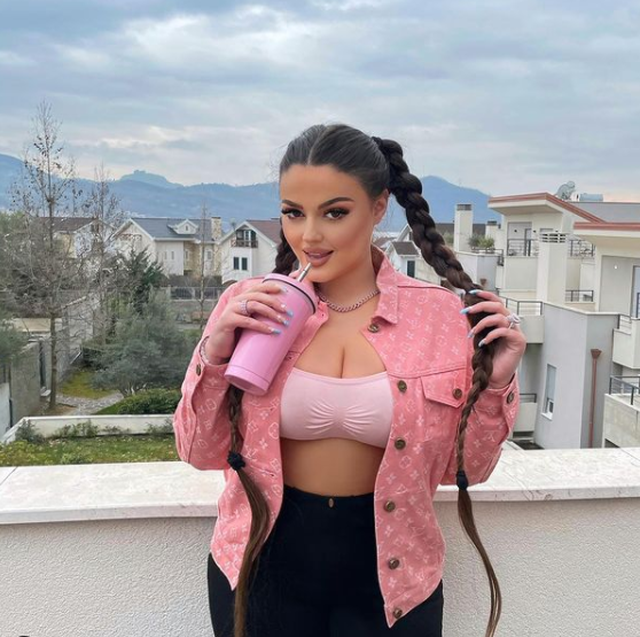

Background information
- Also known as: Enca, King Enca
- Born: Ruensa Haxhiaj; 19 October 1995 (age 30); Tirana, Albania
- Occupations: Singer; actress
- Years active: 2012–present
- Labels: Universal, Folé Publishing

Ruensa Haxhiaj (Albanian: [ɾuˈɛnsa hadʒiˈaj]; born 19 October 1995), known professionally as Enca (pronounced [ˈɛntsa]), is an Albanian singer.

She rose to fame after releasing "A po t'pëlqen" in 2014, gathering over 100,000 views on YouTube within 24 hours. Haxhia made her music debut in 2012 with "The Best Of" and "Kjo Verë". She later joined Big Basta in Kënga Magjike and continued to work with other acclaimed artists. She participated in Top Fest twice, and reached the semi-finals in her second attempt. She also participated in Zhurma Show Awards in 2016, where she won four awards, including the first place.

== Life and career ==
Ruensa Haxhiaj was born on 19 October 1995 in Tirana to an Albanian Orthodox family. Initially, she started posting cover versions of various songs on video-sharing platform YouTube. She started using Keek, a social media for video statuses and gained her own fan base. She sang short parts of various songs, posted videos of her daily life, etc. She also participated in the talent show The Voice of Albania in which she failed twice in a row to pass the blind auditions. Although her debut didn't receive significant feedback, she continued working on her solo career. She was featured in various songs, mainly those of rappers. She participated in the Top Fest twice, in 2013 and 2014. At the 2016 Zhurma Video Music Awards, she won two awards for "Best Pop" and "Best Female" with the music video for her song "Dreq". At the same awards ceremony, she and rapper Noizy jointly won two awards for "Internet Prize" and "Best Video" with the music video for their collaboration "Bow Down".

Haxhia announced her single "A po t'pëlqen", a Kosovar Gheg penned pop-dance song on Keek. She then released the music video in late-July and received an enormous feedback. Besides her national attention, she also gathered a big number of international fans. The song, which gathered hundreds of thousands of views within its first week.

== Discography ==
- 2012 – "The Best Of"
- 2012 – "Kjo Verë"
- 2012 – "100" featuring Big Basta & Etnon
- 2012 – "All That" feat. Big Basta
- 2013 – "Dua të jesh ti", Top Fest 2013.
- 2013 – "Jepe Tash"
- 2013 – "Real Love" feat. Ardit
- 2013 – "E ke rradhën ti"
- 2013 – "Baby Girl & Gangsta Boo" feat. B Genius
- 2014 – "Ata nuk e din" feat. Noizy
- 2014 – "Ishim ne", Top Fest 2014
- 2014 – "A po t'pëlqen"
- 2014 – Enca & Mozzik "Edhe njo"
- 2015 – Soul Killa
- 2015 – Call Me Goddess
- 2016 – Dreq
- 2016 – Bow Down ft. Noizy
- 2017 – Love on my body
- 2017 – Ciao
- 2018 – Dua
- 2018 – Kujt Po I Han feat. Don Phenom
- 2018 – Rendez Vous
- 2019 – "Balad"
- 2019 – Hajde ft. Muharrem Ahmeti
- 2019 – Jealous
- 2019 – MWAH
- 2020 – " Amor (ft Zaza & Mixey) "
- 2020 – "Young and Pretty" – cover
- 2020 – "Perhaps" – cover
- 2020 – "Ku Mete"
- 2020 – "Break Down" (ft. Don Xhoni)
- 2021 – "Ndoshta"
- 2021 – "Rakia"
- 2021 – "Suavele"
- 2022– "Kalle” ft. Navid Zardi
- 2023 - “Albanian” ft. Muharrem Ahmeti”
- 2024 - "Dashni"
- 2025 - "Original”
- 2025 - "Ciao 2"
- 2026 - “

== Awards and nominations ==
Top Music Awards

| Year | Nominee / work | Award | Result |
|---|---|---|---|
| 2016 | "Enca Haxhia" | Female Artist of the Year | Nominated |

Zhurma Show Awards

| Year | Nominee / work | Award | Result |
|---|---|---|---|
| 2014 | "A po t'pelqen" | Best Styling | Nominated |
| 2015 | "Soul Killa" | Best Pop | Nominated |
| 2016 | "Dreq" | Best Pop | Won |
| 2016 | "Dreq" | Best Female | Won |
| 2016 | "Bow Down"(feat.Noizy) | Best Song | Nominated |
| 2016 | "Bow Down"(feat.Noizy) | Best Video/First Prize | Won |
| 2016 | "Bow Down"(feat.Noizy) | Internet Prize | Won |
