= Heincke =

Heincke is a surname. Notable people with the surname include:

- Adolf Heincke (1901–1986), German politician (NSDAP)
- Ernst Heincke (1931–2015), German born American sprint canoer
- Friedrich Heincke (1852–1929), German zoologist and ichthyologist
- Hanswerner Heincke (1905–1986), Germanist

== See also ==
- Heinke (disambiguation)
