= ENSAE =

ENSAE may refer to the following educational institutes in France:

- ENSAE Paris (École nationale de la statistique et de l'administration économique de Paris)
- École nationale supérieure de l'aéronautique et de l'espace, now Institut supérieur de l'aéronautique et de l'espace, in Toulouse
