= Keek =

2011 social networking website

Keek, Inc.
- Company type: Public
- Website type: Social networking service
- Traded as: TSXV KEEK OTC PRSN
- Headquarters: Toronto, Ontario, Canada
- Area served: Worldwide
- Chairperson: Mark Itwaru
- CEO: Mark Itwaru
- Key people: Mark Itwaru (CEO), Brittany Garlin VP Marketing, Yousri Ahmed VP Finance, William Lavin (CFO)
- Industry: Internet
- Website: www.keek.com
- Registration: Required to post Keeks, follow or be followed, subscribe or be subscribed to, add text comments, add "Keekbacks", add "Kred", and send or receive private messages.
- Launched: July 2011; 15 years ago
- Current status: Relaunched 2023

Keek is a Canadian short form video app that originally launched in 2011. It was purchased in 2016 by Personas Social Inc. (Now Keek Social Inc.) and rebooted in 2023. Keek is a free online social networking service game online and share content globally.

Keek allows it users to make money by:

1. Selling subscriptions to their channels.

2. Receiving digital gifts in live streams.

3. Share in advertising revenue.

4. Sell goods and services in the Offerbox.

== Trademarks and Patents ==
Keek and Keek Social Inc. are trademarked names.

United States Provisional Patent Application. No. 63/916,977.

Filed on November 13, 2025.

Title: Systems and Methods for Inserting Visual Elements and Related Metadata

== See also ==
- Instagram
- Mobli
- Snapchat
- Socialcam
- Tout
- Vine
