= Heinke =

Heinke may refer to:

- Heinke (diving equipment manufacturer) (1818–1869), a 19th-century British manufacturer of diving equipment
- George H. Heinke (1882–1940), American politician from Nebraska
- Harald Heinke (born 1955), German judoka
- Heinke Salisch (born 1941), German politician
- Heinke van der Merwe (born 1985), South African player

== See also ==
- Heincke
