= ENSA (gene) =

Protein-coding gene in humans

Identifiers
- Aliases: ENSA, ARPP-19e, endosulfine alpha
- External IDs: OMIM: 603061; MGI: 1891189; GeneCards: ENSA

Gene location (Human)
Chr.	Chromosome 1 (human)
Band	1q21.3	Start	150,600,851 bp
Band	1q21.3	End	150,629,612 bp

Gene location (Mouse)
Chr.	Chromosome 3 (mouse)
Band	3|3 F2.1	Start	95,532,304 bp
Band	3|3 F2.1	End	95,539,413 bp
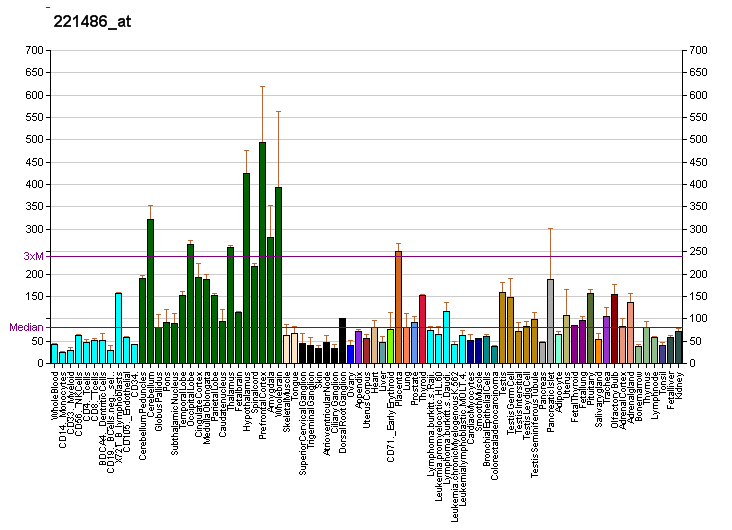

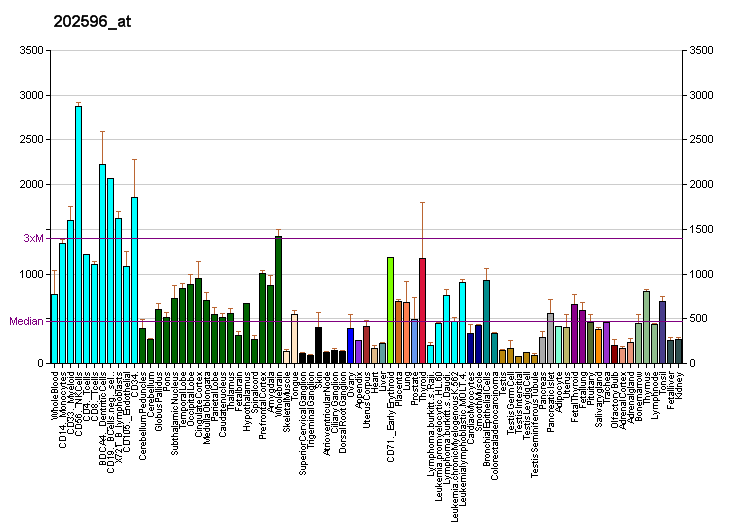

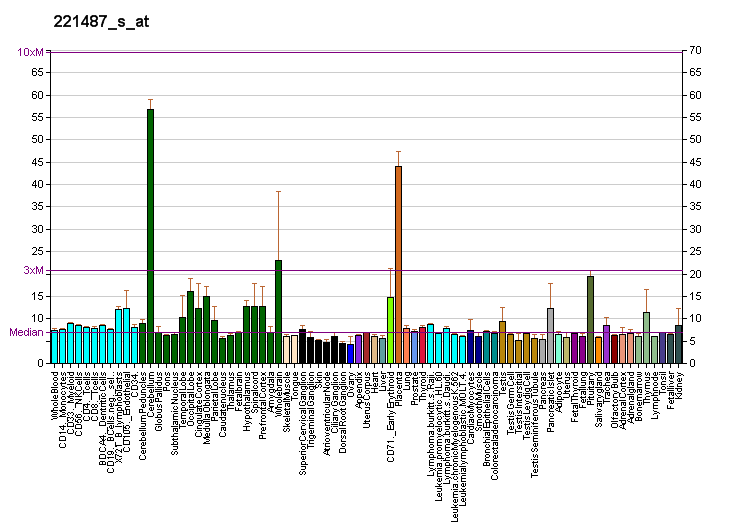
RNA expression pattern
Bgee	Human / Mouse (ortholog); Top expressed in: frontal pole; prefrontal cortex; skin of abdomen; gingival epithelium; Brodmann area 10; right frontal lobe; human penis; skin of leg; vulva; tendon of biceps brachii / Top expressed in: dentate gyrus of hippocampal formation granule cell; superior frontal gyrus; neural layer of retina; prefrontal cortex; temporal muscle; vastus lateralis muscle; triceps brachii muscle; supraoptic nucleus; digastric muscle; sternocleidomastoid muscle; More reference expression data
BioGPS	More reference expression data
Gene ontology
Molecular function	protein phosphatase 2A binding; potassium channel inhibitor activity; signaling receptor binding; protein binding; ion channel inhibitor activity; phosphatase inhibitor activity; protein phosphatase inhibitor activity; protein phosphatase regulator activity
Cellular component	nucleoplasm; cytoplasm
Biological process	cell division; cell cycle; G2/M transition of mitotic cell cycle; response to glucose; response to nutrient; regulation of insulin secretion; negative regulation of catalytic activity; negative regulation of protein dephosphorylation; mitotic cell cycle; negative regulation of phosphoprotein phosphatase activity; regulation of phosphoprotein phosphatase activity
Sources:Amigo / QuickGO
Orthologs
Databases	NCBI: entry; OMA: entry
Species	Human	Mouse
Entrez	2029	56205
Ensembl	ENSG00000143420	ENSMUSG00000038619
UniProt	O43768	P60840
RefSeq (mRNA)	NM_207168; NM_004436; NM_207042; NM_207043; NM_207044 NM_207045; NM_207046; NM_207047	NM_001026212; NM_019561
RefSeq (protein)	NP_004427; NP_996925; NP_996926; NP_996927; NP_996928 NP_996929; NP_996930; NP_997051	NP_001021383; NP_062507
Location (UCSC)	Chr 1: 150.6 – 150.63 Mb	Chr 3: 95.53 – 95.54 Mb
PubMed search
- Wikidata
View/Edit Human	View/Edit Mouse

Alpha-endosulfine is a protein that in humans is encoded by the ENSA gene.

The protein encoded by this gene belongs to a highly conserved cAMP-regulated phosphoprotein (ARPP) family. This protein was identified as an endogenous ligand for the sulfonylurea receptor, ABCC8/SUR1. ABCC8 is the regulatory subunit of the ATP-sensitive potassium (KATP) channel, which is located on the plasma membrane of pancreatic beta cells and plays a key role in the control of insulin release from pancreatic beta cells. This protein is thought to be an endogenous regulator of KATP channels. In vitro studies have demonstrated that this protein modulates insulin secretion through the interaction with KATP channel, and this gene has been proposed as a candidate gene for type 2 diabetes. At least eight alternatively spliced transcript variants encoding distinct isoforms have been observed.
