= Enza (given name) =

Enza is a given name. Notable people with the name include:

- Enza Anderson (born 1964), Canadian journalist and politician
- Enza Barilla (born 1991), Australian football player
- Enza Petrilli or Vincenza Petrilli (born 1990), Italian paralympic archer

== See also ==
- Vincenza, given name
