= Tout (company) =

Social networking service and microblogging service (2010–2019)

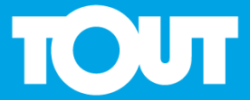
- Company type: Private
- Website type: Social network service, microblogging
- Available in: Multilingual
- Dissolved: 2019
- Headquarters: San Francisco, United States
- Area served: Worldwide
- Owners: SRI International; WWE (5.2%)
- Founder: Michael Downing
- Industry: Internet industry
- Commercial: Yes
- Registration: Required (to post, follow or be followed)
- Launched: April 2010
- Current status: Inactive

Tout was an online social networking service and microblogging service that enabled its users to send and view 15-second videos, known as "touts." The service's core technology was created at SRI International by Michael Downing based on two patents owned by that company.

In April 2010, Tout spun off as its own company with SRI taking an equity stake. Tout gained popularity in June 2011 when basketball player Shaquille O'Neal used the service to announce his retirement. By early 2012, Tout had received over 12 million visitors and 75 million Touts had been shared by users of the service.

== Investors ==
On July 11, 2012, the company announced a $13.4 million round of Series B funding; professional wrestling promotion WWE participated in the funding round, and announced a two-year strategic partnership with the company. During WWE CEO Vince McMahon's quarterly conference call with investors held on the morning of August 2, WWE CFO George Barrios disclosed the amount of that investment to have been $5 million, but would not disclose what percentage of the company that sum represents. Stephanie McMahon, CBO of WWE, would appear on the board of directors for Tout.

As part of the strategic partnership, WWE subsequently promoted Tout via its platforms, including encouraging its talent to use the service, and showcasing posts by viewers and WWE talent during segments of its television programs. However, as Tout proved to be largely unpopular, WWE stopped promoting Tout in early 2013 and let their strategic partnership expire in 2014, after which Tout quickly folded.

== See also ==
- Keek
- Vine (service)
