= WrestleMania XXX =

2014 WWE pay-per-view event

- Promotional poster
- Promotion: WWE
- Date: April 6, 2014
- City: New Orleans, Louisiana
- Venue: Mercedes-Benz Superdome
- Attendance: 60,000–65,000
- Buy rate: 684,000 (excluding WWE Network views)
- Tagline(s): Laissez les bons temps rouler (Let the Good Times Roll)

WWE event chronology
← Previous; NXT Arrival	Next → Extreme Rules

WrestleMania chronology
← Previous; 29	Next → 31

WrestleMania XXX was a 2014 professional wrestling pay-per-view (PPV) and livestreaming event produced by WWE. It was the 30th annual WrestleMania and took place on April 6, 2014, at the Mercedes-Benz Superdome in New Orleans, Louisiana. This was the first WWE event simultaneously broadcast live on PPV and livestreamed on WWE's subscription streaming service, the WWE Network, which launched in February. WWE Hall of Famer Hulk Hogan served as the host of the event.

Eight matches were contested on the event's card, including one on the Pre-Show. In the main event, Daniel Bryan defeated Batista and defending champion Randy Orton in a triple threat match to win the WWE World Heavyweight Championship after Bryan qualified for the match by defeating Triple H in the opening bout. In other prominent matches, John Cena defeated Bray Wyatt and Brock Lesnar defeated The Undertaker to end his undefeated streak at WrestleMania. The event also saw the WWE Divas Championship defended on the main card for the first and only time it was contested at a WrestleMania.

WWE claimed US$10.9 million in ticket revenue for WrestleMania XXX and estimated a $142.2 million economic impact on New Orleans. The event has received highly positive reviews, and is often regarded as one of the greatest WrestleMania events of all time. SLAM! Wrestling rated the show a 4.5 out of 5, while Pro Wrestling Torch rated the event 8.75 out of 10 and The Times-Picayune described it as "spectacular". Particular praise has been given to the overall Daniel Bryan vs. The Authority storyline, which culminated at the event. Despite the event's positive reception, the decision to have Brock Lesnar end The Undertaker's undefeated streak polarized fans, critics, and former wrestlers.

== Production ==
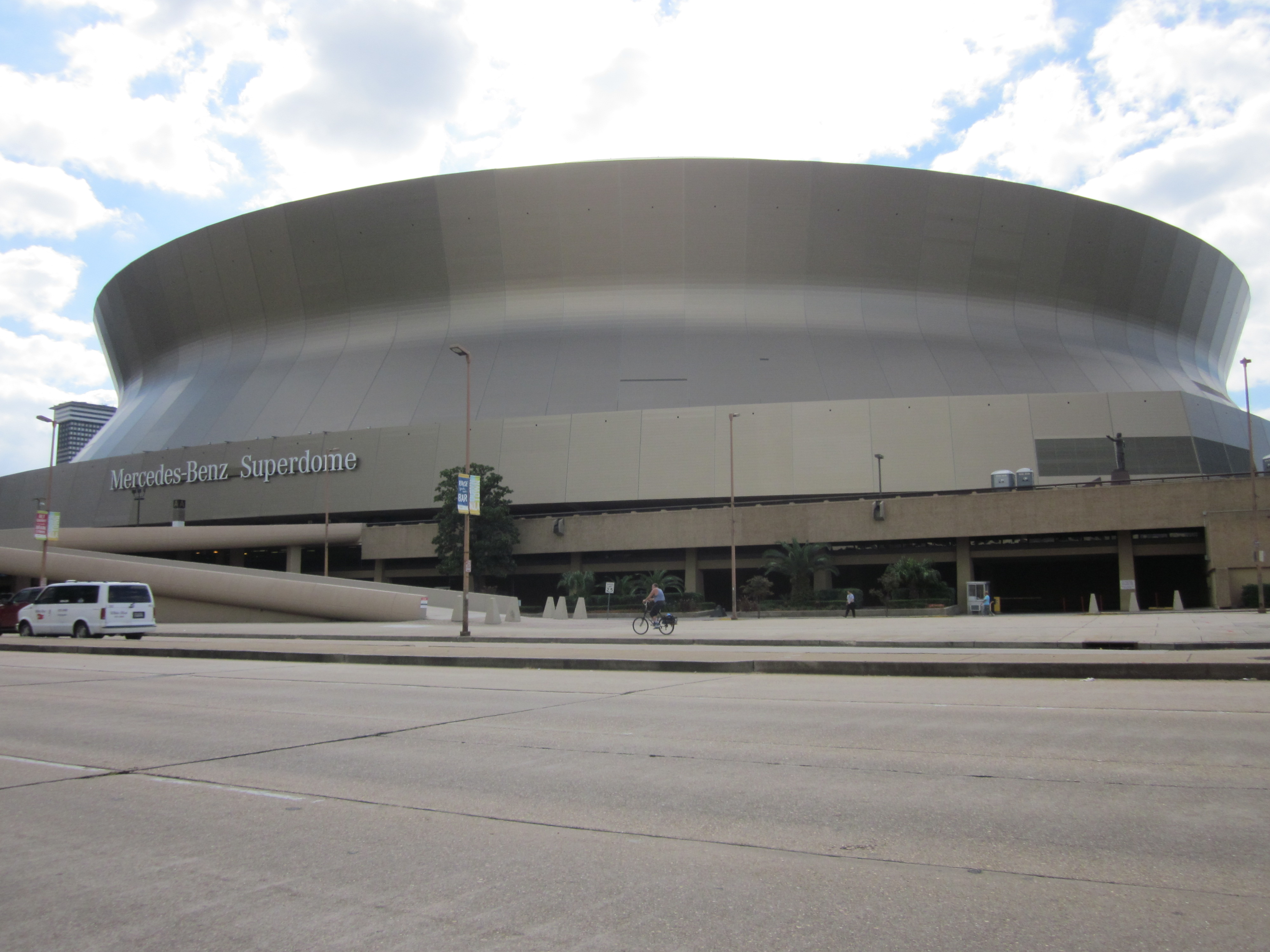
The 30th annual WrestleMania was held at the Mercedes-Benz Superdome in New Orleans, Louisiana.

=== Background ===
WrestleMania is considered WWE's flagship professional wrestling pay-per-view (PPV) event, having first been held in 1985. It is the longest-running professional wrestling event in history and is held annually between mid-March to mid-April. It was the first of WWE's original four pay-per-views, which includes Royal Rumble, SummerSlam, and Survivor Series, referred to as the "Big Four". The event has been described as the Super Bowl of sports entertainment.

On February 18, 2013, WWE announced that WrestleMania XXX (alternatively stylized as WrestleMania 30) would be held at the Mercedes-Benz Superdome in New Orleans, Louisiana on April 6, 2014. On August 12, travel packages for WrestleMania XXX went on sale, which included tickets to WrestleMania, hotel room accommodation, and other activities, including WrestleMania Axxess, the 2014 WWE Hall of Fame ceremony, and the Raw after WrestleMania; the cheapest package cost $795 per person. On November 16, individual tickets went on sale through Ticketmaster, with prices ranging from $25 to $850.

In addition to being sold as a pay-per-view through television providers (with prices ranging from $55 to $70), WrestleMania XXX was the first WWE PPV event to be livestreamed in simulcast on the WWE Network—WWE's subscription streaming service that launched in February with video on demand access to the company's library, original programming, and pay-per-view events, costing $9.99 per month with a six-month contract.

The event was the first WrestleMania to be held in the state of Louisiana. There were four official theme songs for the event: "Celebrate" by Kid Rock, "Legacy" by Eminem, "In Time" by Mark Collie, and "Monster" by Imagine Dragons. A promotional poster for the event was released through pay-per-view providers, such as In Demand, with the tagline laissez les bons temps rouler. The WrestleMania set was built by a crew of roughly 400 workers over two weeks, assembling equipment carried by 85 semi-trailer trucks.

After the 2014 Royal Rumble event in late January, CM Punk reportedly legitimately walked out on WWE while still under contract and WWE stopped promoting him for future events; which Pro Wrestling Torch editor Wade Keller analyzed as playing a part in Daniel Bryan's WrestleMania journey. In May 2014, Bryan revealed in an interview that he also believed that WWE decided to give him the big WrestleMania spotlight only after Punk quit. Daniel Bryan entered the event as the bookmakers' favorite to walk out of WrestleMania as champion, while the biggest favorite to earn a victory was the Undertaker, which Forbes endorsed as "as close to a sure thing as you're going to find".

=== Storylines ===
The event comprised eight matches, including one on the Pre-Show, that resulted from scripted storylines. Results were predetermined by WWE's writers, while storylines were produced on WWE's weekly television shows, Raw and SmackDown.

When [Vince McMahon] had HHH call Bryan a B+ player, that is because Vince saw Bryan that way. Vince was just going to screw Bryan in the storylines and then push him down the card. It was so bad that Bryan was slated to wrestle fifth or sixth from the top against Sheamus at [WrestleMania XXX] until the fans said, loudly, "ENOUGH!" They hijacked shows until Vince had no choice but to change his plans...

— Dave Scherer of PWInsider.com's analysis of Daniel Bryan's feud with the Authority

Daniel Bryan's eight-month road to WrestleMania began at SummerSlam in August 2013, when he started feuding with Triple H and Randy Orton. Since June, Bryan had been praised as one of the top performers in WWE by critics and veterans of the professional wrestling industry, as his rise in status led him to a title shot at SummerSlam. At SummerSlam, Bryan defeated John Cena to win his first WWE Championship with Triple H as the special guest referee. After the match, Triple H turned heel by attacking Bryan, which directly led to Orton using his Money in the Bank title opportunity for an immediate title shot. Orton pinned a downed Bryan to capture the WWE Championship. After SummerSlam, Triple H claimed that it was a "business decision" to sabotage Bryan because Bryan did not fit the type of wrestler that the company was looking for as its champion; therefore, Triple H and Stephanie McMahon (later known as The Authority) instead endorsed Orton as the "face of the WWE". Over the next few months, Bryan was constantly sabotaged in his attempts to gain and hold on to the WWE Championship. Bryan defeated Orton to regain the WWE Championship at Night of Champions, but due to referee Scott Armstrong making a fast count, Triple H stripped Bryan of the title the next night on Raw. At Battleground, a match between Bryan and Orton for the vacant title ended in a no contest when Big Show (who had been manipulated by the Authority in the weeks prior) attacked both men. Bryan once again challenged Orton in a Hell in a Cell match for the vacant championship at Hell in a Cell; Triple H interfered in the match and was attacked by Bryan, resulting in special guest referee Shawn Michaels attacking Bryan, which led to Orton capturing the WWE Championship again.

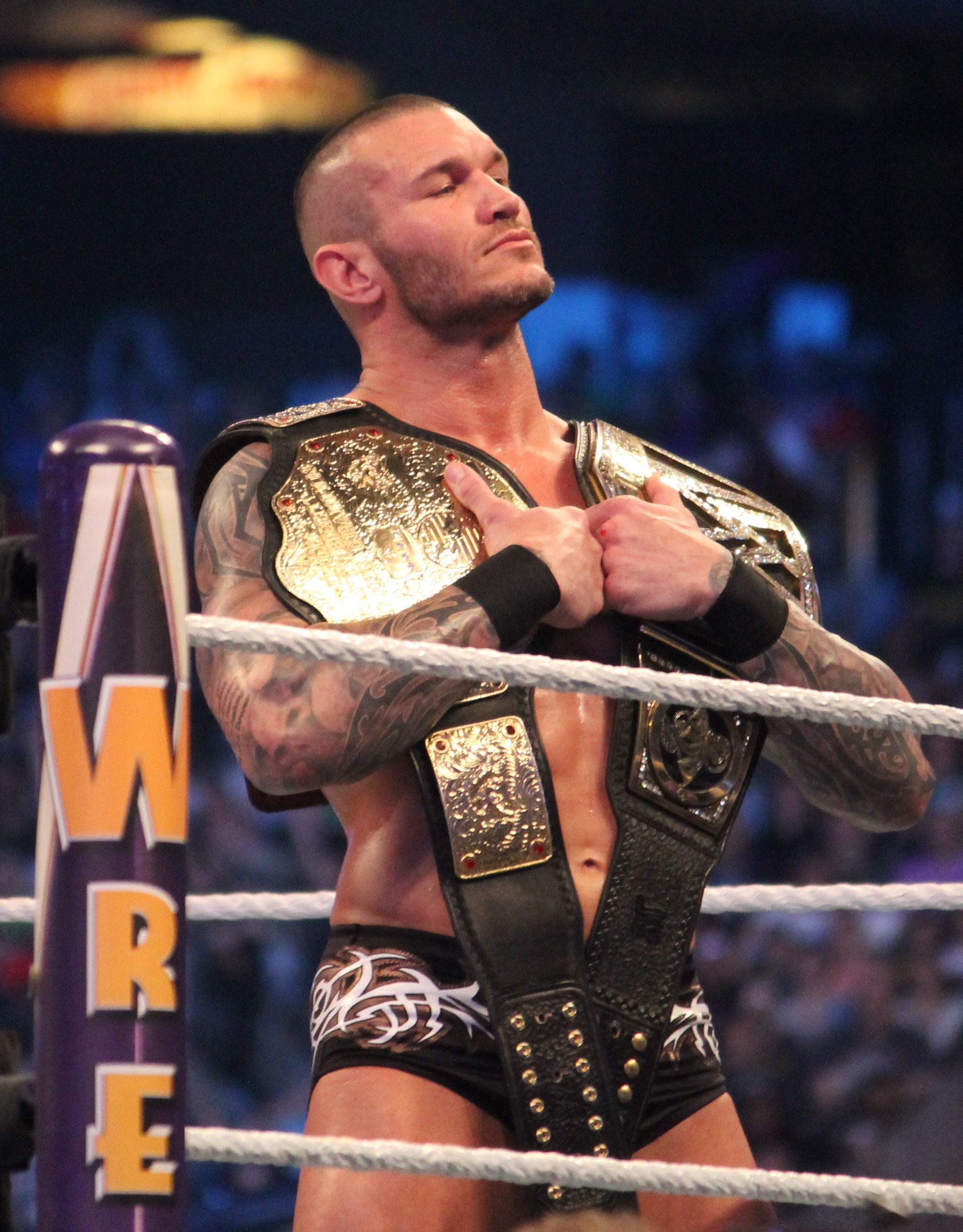
Randy Orton was the defending WWE World Heavyweight Champion heading into WrestleMania XXX.

At TLC: Tables, Ladders & Chairs, WWE Champion Randy Orton defeated World Heavyweight Champion John Cena in a TLC match to unify the two titles into the new WWE World Heavyweight Championship. In January 2014, Batista returned to WWE after having left in May 2010, and promptly won the 2014 Royal Rumble match for a slot in the WWE World Heavyweight Championship match at WrestleMania XXX. Batista's win and Daniel Bryan's lack of participation in the Royal Rumble match was heavily booed by the live crowd at the Royal Rumble. At Elimination Chamber, Randy Orton successfully defended his championship in the Elimination Chamber match to set up Orton versus Batista (who still received a negative fan reaction at Elimination Chamber when he defeated Alberto Del Rio) for the WWE World Heavyweight Championship match at WrestleMania XXX. Daniel Bryan also participated in the Elimination Chamber match, but was the last wrestler eliminated due to interference by Director of Operations Kane, who was affiliated with the Authority.

Frustrated over being constantly cost the WWE World Heavyweight Championship by the Authority, Bryan challenged Triple H to a match at WrestleMania XXX. When Triple H refused Bryan's challenge, Bryan brought a large group of fans on the March 10 episode of Raw to "occupy" the ring and refused to leave. An irate Triple H agreed to Bryan's demand for a WrestleMania match with the stipulation that if Bryan won, he would be inserted into the WWE World Heavyweight Championship match at WrestleMania. On the March 17 episode of Raw, Triple H voiced his frustrations over Orton and Batista, then changed the stipulation of his own match, guaranteeing that the winner between him and Bryan would be added to the WWE World Heavyweight Championship match, thus assuring a triple threat match for the title.

On the February 24 episode of Raw, Brock Lesnar and his manager Paul Heyman voiced their complaints about Lesnar not being in the WWE World Heavyweight Championship match at WrestleMania. Instead, the Authority offered Lesnar a contract to face anyone else at WrestleMania. They were interrupted by a returning Undertaker, in his first appearance since April 2013, who confronted Lesnar. While Lesnar signed the contract for a match at WrestleMania with The Undertaker as his opponent, The Undertaker accepted Lesnar's challenge by stabbing Lesnar with a pen and performing a chokeslam on Lesnar through a table. This set up a match where Lesnar would attempt to break The Undertaker's 21–0 undefeated streak at WrestleMania.

At the Royal Rumble, The Wyatt Family (Luke Harper, Erick Rowan, and Bray Wyatt) cost John Cena his match for the WWE World Heavyweight Championship against Randy Orton. At the Elimination Chamber event, the Wyatt Family attacked Cena during his Elimination Chamber match for the same championship, which directly led to Cena's elimination from the match. Wyatt was motivated by a desire to end "this era of lies", beginning with Cena, because he wanted to expose to the world that Cena being an upholder of all that is moral and good and right was merely a hollow illusion. Proving that Cena was a fraud would ruin his legacy, but Wyatt wanted to take it one step further by turning Cena into a monster. On the March 10 episode of Raw, Cena issued Wyatt a challenge for a match at WrestleMania, which Wyatt accepted.

== Event ==
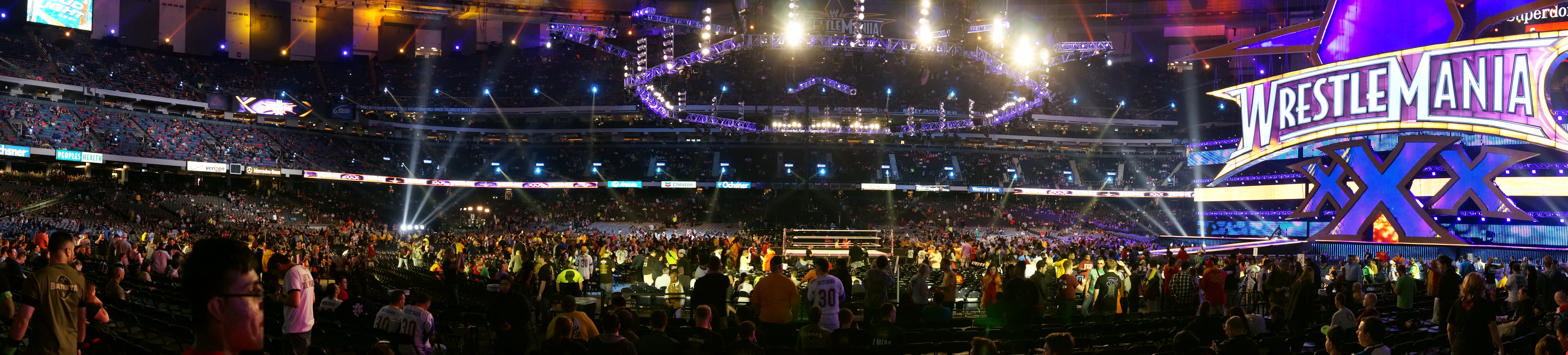
A panorama shot of the event within the Mercedes-Benz Superdome

Other on-screen personnel
Role	Name
Host	Hulk Hogan
English Commentators	Michael Cole
English Commentators	Jerry Lawler
English Commentators	John "Bradshaw" Layfield
Spanish Commentators	Carlos Cabrera
Spanish Commentators	Marcelo Rodríguez
Spanish Commentators	Ricardo Rodriguez
French Commentators	Christophe Agius
French Commentators	Philippe Chéreau
Interviewer	Gene Okerlund
Ring announcers	Lilian Garcia (SmackDown)
Ring announcers	Justin Roberts (Raw)
Ring announcers	Howard Finkel (WWE Hall of Fame)
Referees	Charles Robinson
Referees	Mike Chioda
Referees	John Cone
Referees	Ryan Tran
Referees	Chad Patton
Referees	Jason Ayers
Referees	Rod Zapata
Referees	Scott Armstrong
Pre-show panel	Josh Mathews
Pre-show panel	Booker T
Pre-show panel	Alex Riley
Pre-show panel	Trish Stratus

=== Commentary ===
Analysis was hosted by Josh Mathews with Mick Foley, Booker T, and Shawn Michaels; joining midway were retired National Football League linebacker Shawne Merriman, Jimmy Hart, Alex Riley, and Trish Stratus. Renee Young directed social media discussion, while Byron Saxton and Tom Phillips conducted backstage interviews.

=== Pre-show ===
The WrestleMania Pre-Show was split into two segments, each an hour long; the first half could be watched for free on WWE.com, YouTube, and other social media outlets, while the second half (which had the pre-show match) was only available on the WWE Network.

The Pre-Show match was a fatal four-way elimination tag team match for the WWE Tag Team Championship between defending champions The Usos (Jey Uso and Jimmy Uso), RybAxel (Ryback and Curtis Axel), Los Matadores (Diego and Fernando), accompanied by El Torito, and The Real Americans (Jack Swagger and Cesaro), (accompanied by Zeb Colter). Swagger applied the Patriot Lock on Fernando to eliminate Los Matadores, followed by Cesaro, who performed a European uppercut after throwing Ryback in the air and hit a Neutralizer on Ryback to eliminate RybAxel. In the closing moments, after Jey Uso threw Cesaro into Swagger, Jimmy Uso tagged in and the Usos performed a double superkick and then a double top rope diving splash on Cesaro to retain the titles. Following the match, Swagger blamed Cesaro for the loss and applied the Patriot Lock in Cesaro. Colter demanded that they put their differences aside, however, Cesaro performed the giant swing on Swagger and walked off.

=== Miscellaneous ===
The English commentators for the event were Michael Cole, John "Bradshaw" Layfield, and Jerry "The King" Lawler, while there were also Spanish and French commentators at ringside. Justin Roberts and Lilian Garcia acted as ring announcers. Charles Robinson and John Cone were noted to have refereed Triple H's and John Cena's matches respectively.

During the event, the 2014 WWE Hall of Fame inductees (Jake "The Snake" Roberts, Mr. T, Carlos Colon, Lita, Scott Hall, and Ultimate Warrior), along with brothers Daniel and Paul Moody, real life sons of deceased Hall of Fame inductee Paul Bearer, who appeared before the live audience after Howard Finkel introduced them. Two backstage segments included WWE veterans; the first consisted of Hacksaw Jim Duggan, Sgt. Slaughter, Ricky Steamboat, "The Million Dollar Man" Ted DiBiase and Ron Simmons. The second consisted of wrestlers involved in the main event match at WrestleMania I, with Hulk Hogan, Mr. T, Rowdy Roddy Piper and Paul Orndorff. Pat Patterson, and Mean Gene Okerlund also appeared. Meanwhile, WWE Hall of Famers Bruno Sammartino, Harley Race, Bob Backlund, Dusty Rhodes, and Bret Hart were shown at ringside.

=== Preliminary matches ===
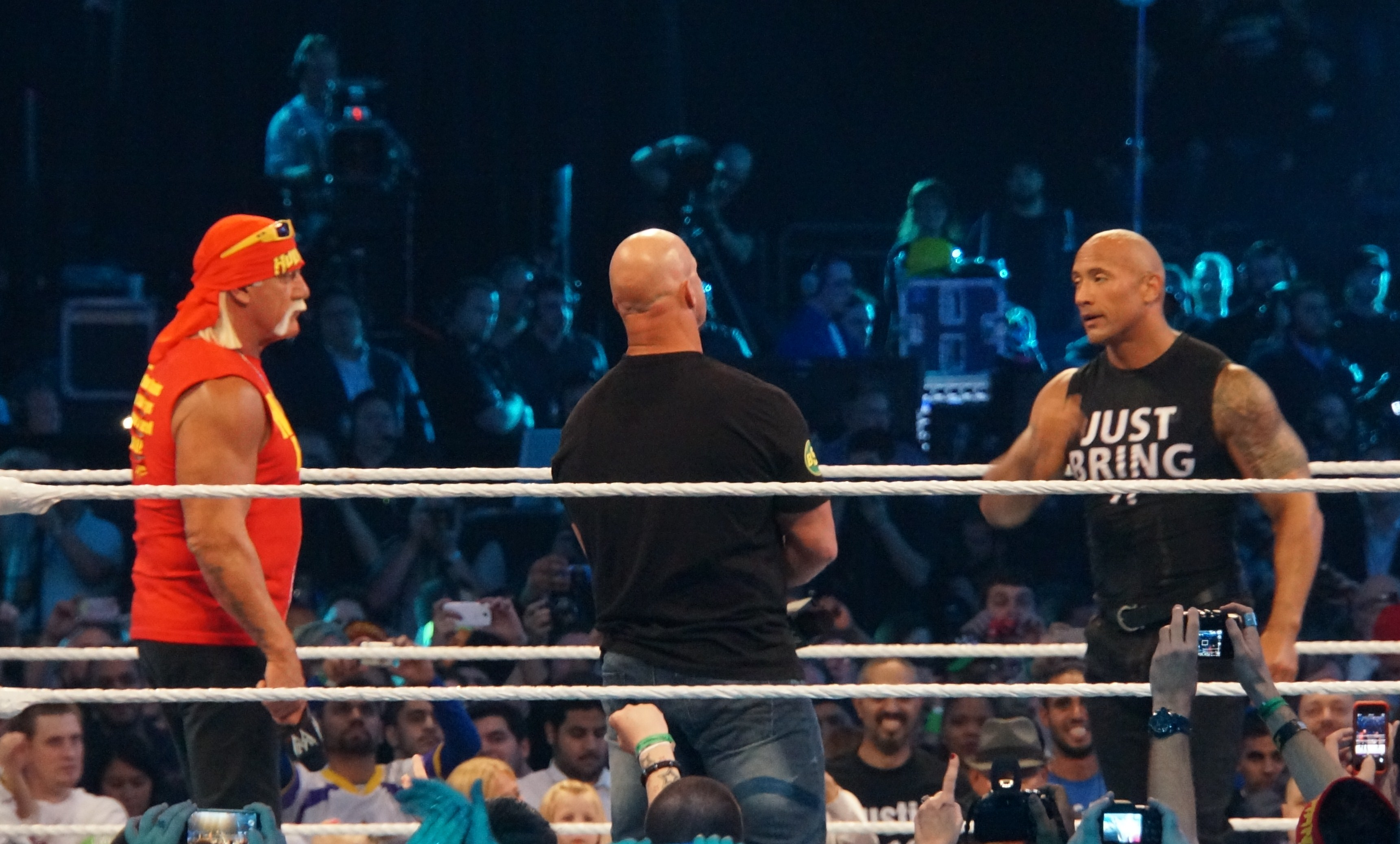
The pay-per-view began with Hulk Hogan (left), "Stone Cold" Steve Austin, and The Rock sharing the ring

The pay-per-view event started when host Hulk Hogan came down to the ring for a segment, at one point accidentally calling the Superdome the "Silverdome". A few moments later, "Stone Cold" Steve Austin joined him in the ring, teasing a confrontation between the two. After that, The Rock also came down to the ring. The three reminisced about past WrestleManias and led the crowd in their signature chants and catchphrases. They then shared a number of beers together before departing the ring.

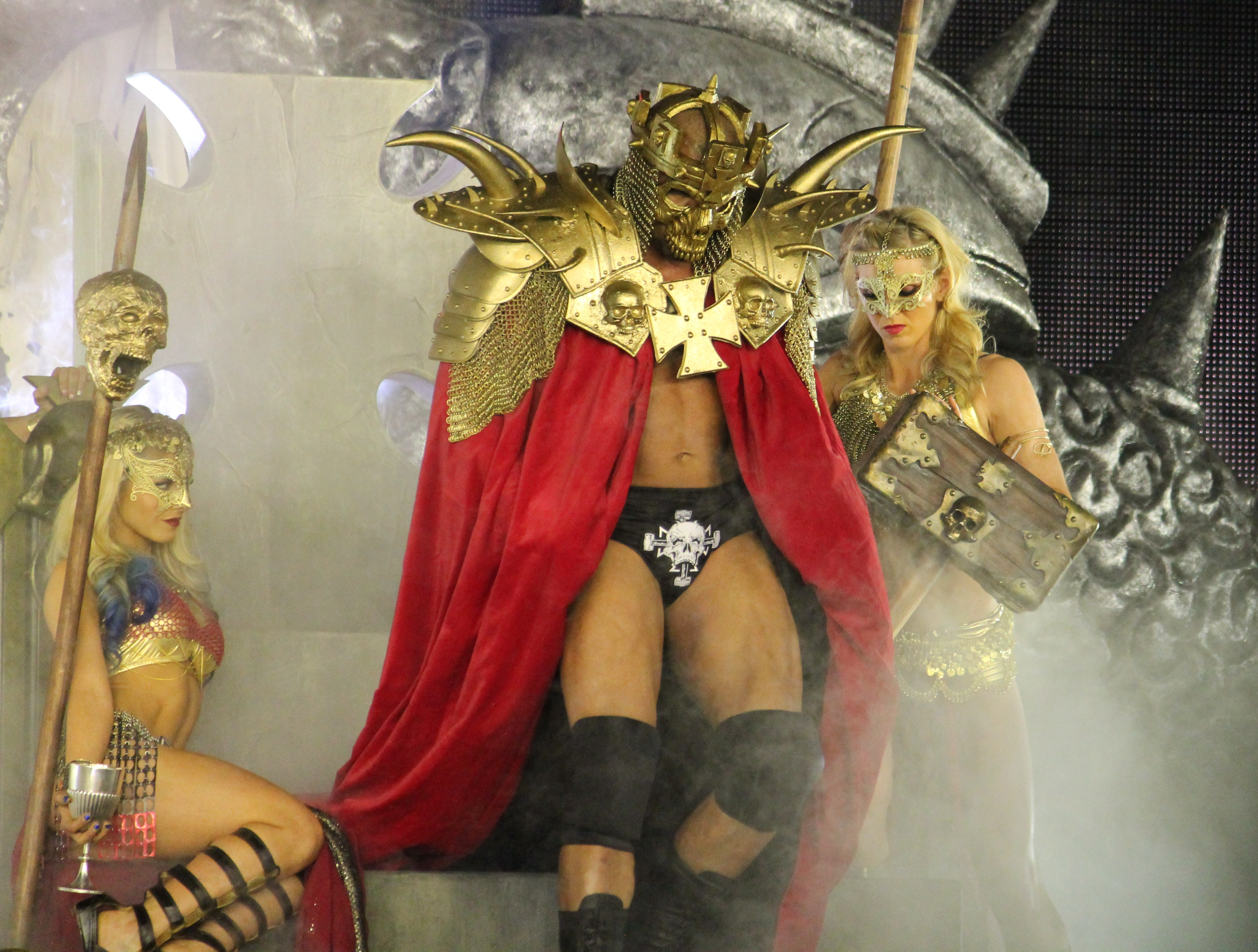
Triple H making a grand entrance for his match against Daniel Bryan

In the first match on the pay-per-view, Daniel Bryan faced Triple H (who was accompanied by Stephanie McMahon) where the winner would be inserted to the main event in a triple threat match for the WWE World Heavyweight Championship later that night. Bryan kicked away Triple H's handshake and started the match strongly, including performing a tornado DDT off the apron. Triple H gained the advantage by driving Bryan's injured arm into the announce table and continually attacking the arm including a hammerlock belly-to-back suplex on the apron. Triple H applied the crossface chickenwing and a regular crossface on Bryan, however, Bryan did not submit. Bryan applied a Yes! Lock" on Triple H, however, Triple H reached the ropes to void the submission. As Bryan attempted a running knee, Triple H countered with a spinebuster and Pedigree for a nearfall. In the end, Bryan performed the running knee on Triple H to win the match and advance to the main event in a triple threat match for the championship. Following the match, McMahon slapped Bryan and distracting him long enough for Triple H to attack him from behind. Triple H placed Bryan's injured arm against the ring post and struck it with a steel folding chair. Medical staff tended to Bryan while Triple H and McMahon celebrated on the stage.

Next, The New Age Outlaws (Road Dogg and Billy Gunn) and Kane faced The Shield (Dean Ambrose, Seth Rollins and Roman Reigns). In the end, Reigns performed a Spear on Kane, and Reigns then performed another Spear on both Outlaws simultaneously. The Shield then performed their Triple Powerbomb maneuver on both Outlaws to win the match.

After that, the battle royal for the André the Giant Memorial Trophy was contested. Yoshi Tatsu, Brad Maddox and Brodus Clay were eliminated by The Great Khali. Khali was eliminated by all three members of 3MB (Heath Slater, Drew McIntyre and Jinder Mahal). Mark Henry then eliminated 3MB, followed by Big Show eliminating Henry. Fandango eliminated Big E and showboated on the ring apron, prompting Sheamus to perform over 20 forearm clubs to Fandango's chest and eliminate him. Cesaro, an unannounced entrant who had wrestled on the pre-show, eliminated Rey Mysterio with a European uppercut and then threw Kofi Kingston out of the ring, however, Kingston survived as his feet landed on the ring steps. Kingston returned to the match only for Sheamus to eliminate him. Alberto Del Rio, who had earlier eliminated Goldust and Cody Rhodes, eliminated Dolph Ziggler. The final four were Del Rio, Sheamus, Cesaro and Show. Del Rio and Sheamus eliminated each other, leaving Cesaro and Show to fight back and forth until Cesaro lifted Show and body slammed him out of the ring to win the match and trophy, mirroring Hulk Hogan's momentous body slam of André the Giant at WrestleMania III in March 1987.

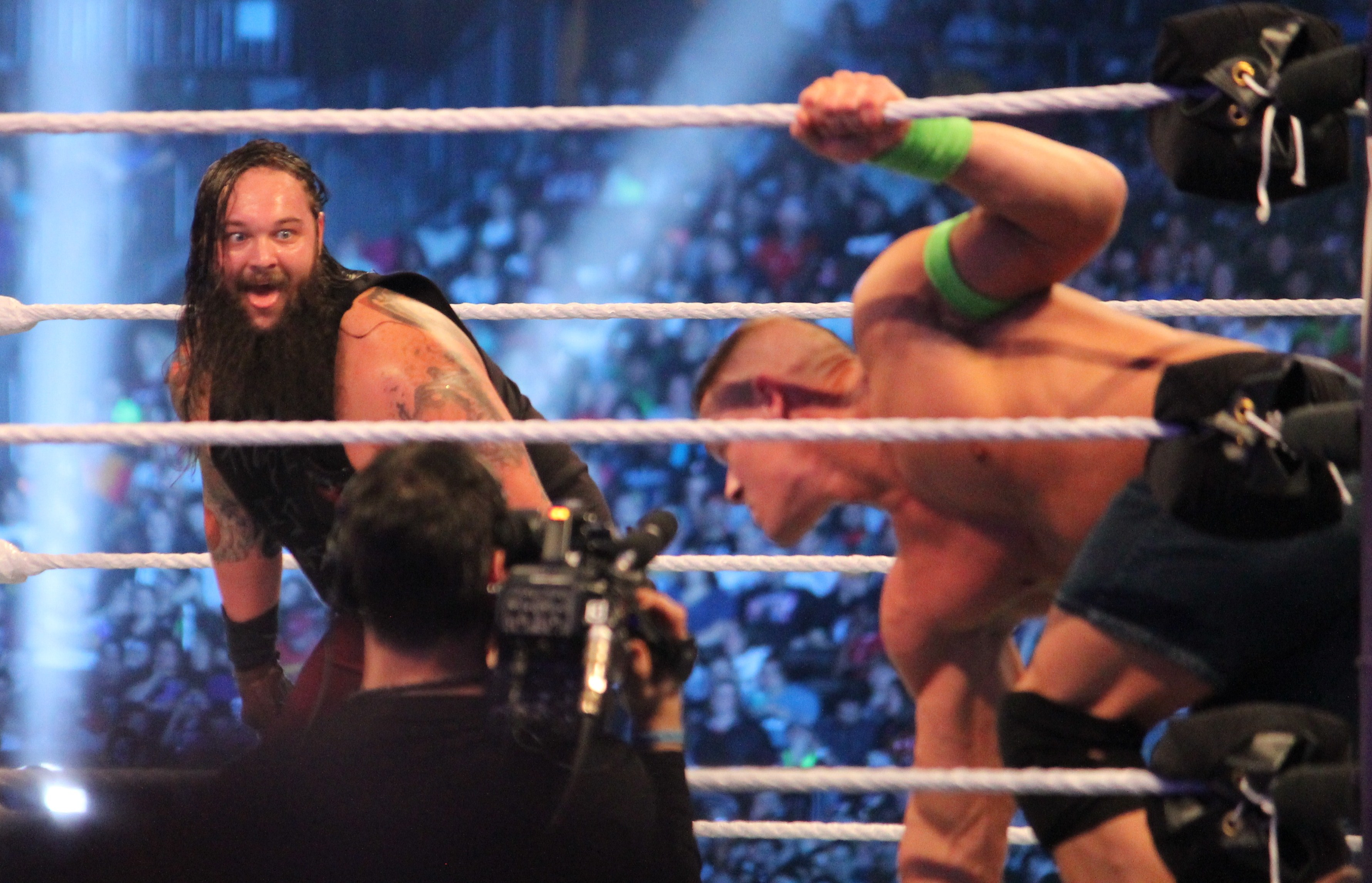
Bray Wyatt glances at John Cena during their match.

Next, John Cena faced Bray Wyatt (who was accompanied by Luke Harper and Erick Rowan). Wyatt started the match by kneeling down and imploring Cena to become the monster that he is and to finish him off, however, Cena refused. Wyatt then continued to taunt Cena which led to Cena's aggressive retaliation. As Cena was about to perform a Five Knuckle Shuffle on Wyatt, Wyatt responded with a 'crab pose' that shocked Cena into retreating. Wyatt performed a DDT on Cena on the apron for a nearfall. Cena performed a Crossbody on Harper and Rowan who were at ringside. Cena performed an Attitude Adjustment on Wyatt for a nearfall. Cena applied the STF on Wyatt, however, Wyatt reached the ropes to void the submission. Wyatt performed a Sister Abigail on Cena for a near fall. In the closing moments, Wyatt obtained a steel folding chair and tossed it to Cena, once again imploring Cena to use it on him, however, Cena instead attacked Rowan (who was standing on the ring apron), and Wyatt capitalized by rolling Cena up for a near-fall. Cena then countered another Sister Abigail attempt and performed an Attitude Adjustment to win the match.

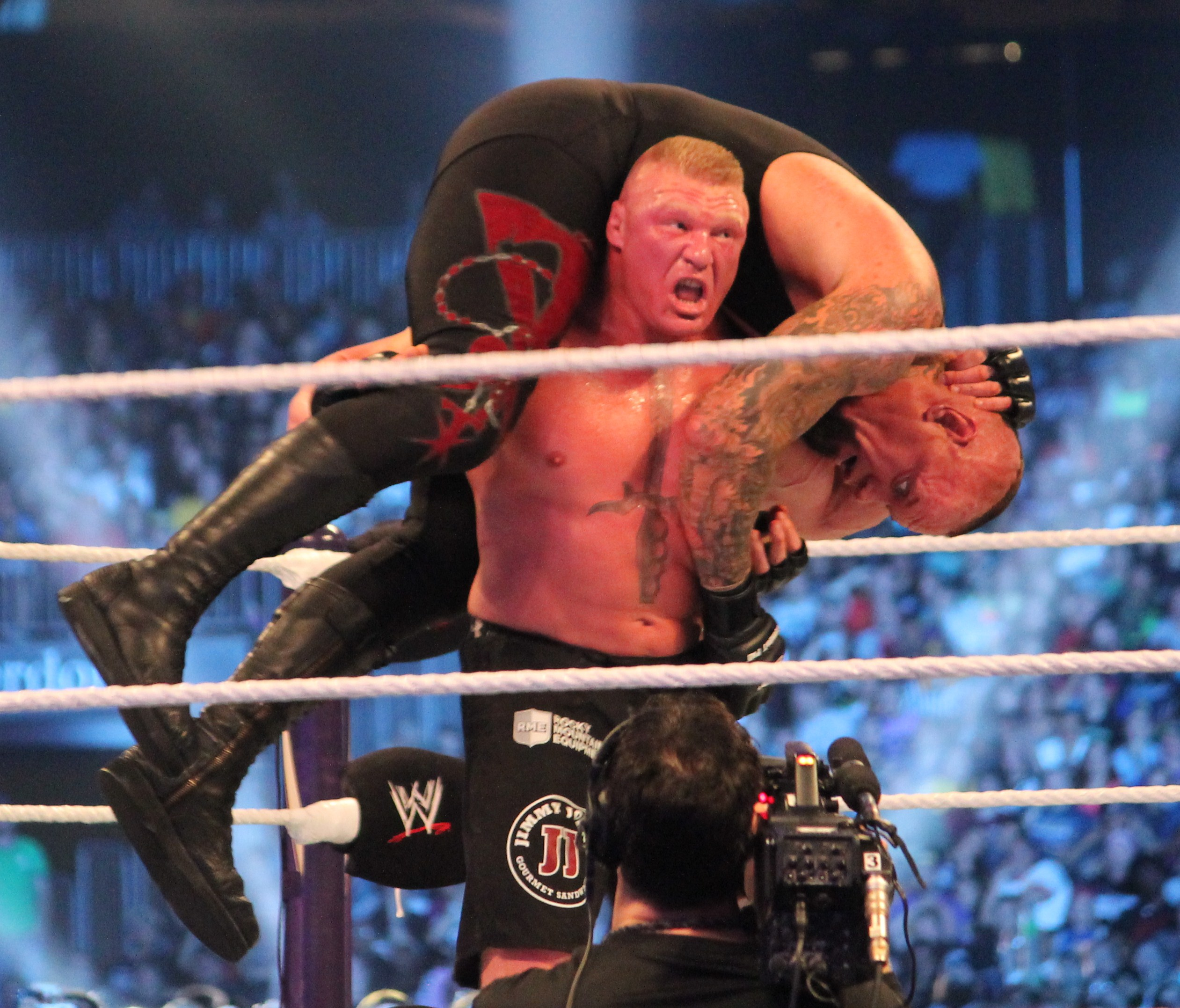
One of three F-5s that Brock Lesnar performed on The Undertaker. The third ended The Undertaker's 21–0 undefeated streak at WrestleMania.

In the next match, Brock Lesnar (accompanied by Paul Heyman) faced The Undertaker. The match started out with Lesnar clotheslining The Undertaker over the top rope, with the latter landing on his feet; both men went into early chokeslam and F-5 teases, but easily avoided the finishers. They then moved out of the ring; almost six minutes in, Lesnar slammed The Undertaker onto the floor, resulting in a serious head concussion that would last throughout the match. Lesnar then sent The Undertaker onto a guardrail, before getting him back to the ring. After a few jabs from Lesnar, The Undertaker hit him with a DDT off the ropes to buy some time. At 12 minutes, The Undertaker put the Snake Eyes into a big boot and dropped the leg for a two-count, followed by a chokeslam, and then an attempted Tombstone Piledriver before Lesnar countered with an F-5, which The Undertaker kicked out of. The Undertaker applied the Hell's Gate on Lesnar, however, Lesnar broke the hold by lifting The Undertaker up and powerbombing him. After some more Hell's Gates and Kimura Locks applied by both men, Lesnar countered an Old School attempt by The Undertaker into another F-5 for a nearfall. The Undertaker responded with a Last Ride powerbomb and a Tombstone Piledriver for a nearfall. As The Undertaker attempted a second Tombstone Piledriver, Lesnar countered and performed an F-5 on The Undertaker to win the match, ending The Undertaker's undefeated streak at WrestleMania. Heyman then "freaked out" at the result and WWE did not play Lesnar's theme music immediately after his victory, highlighting the reaction of a shocked and stunned crowd, just before Justin Roberts announced Lesnar as the winner. Instead, a graphic was displaying on the stadiums screens showing The Undertaker's WrestleMania record of "21–1". The crowd eventually booed Lesnar as he left. The Undertaker was left in the ring, where he gathered himself. As he slowly walked up the entrance ramp, WWE's announcers gave him a standing ovation while the crowd chanted his name which was accompanied by various "thank you Taker" chants.

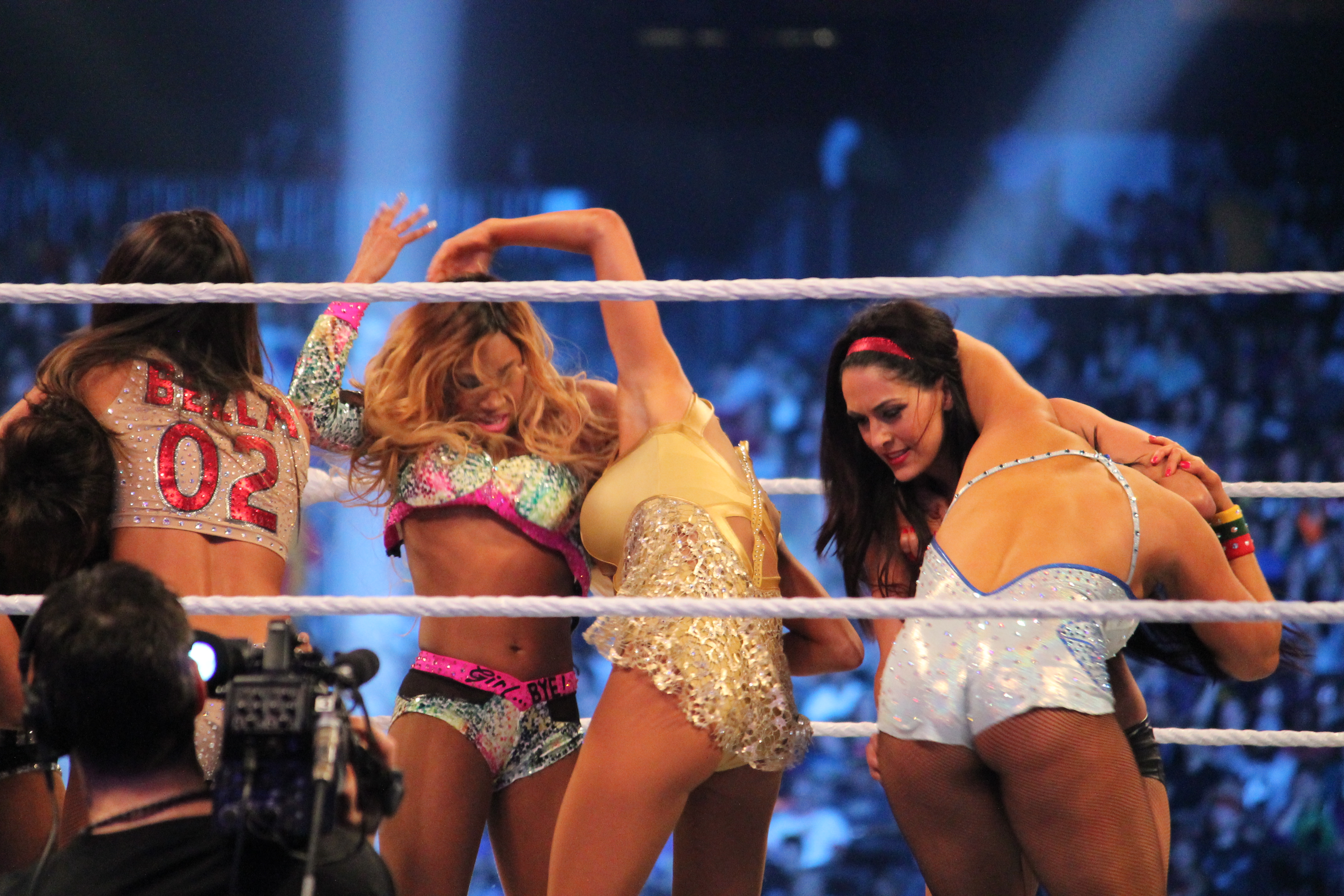
The WWE Divas wrestling during the Vickie Guerrero Divas Championship Invitational

The penultimate match was the 14-Diva single-fall Vickie Guerrero Divas Championship Invitational for the WWE Divas Championship in which AJ Lee defended the title against the entire Divas division; this marked the only time the title was defended at a WrestleMania. The match started with the other wrestlers attacking Lee and her bodyguard, Tamina Snuka. As the match progressed, Aksana met Naomi at the top rope. Natalya performed a powerbomb superplex combination on Aksana. Snuka pulled Aksana out of the ring to prevent Natalya from winning, so Natalya clotheslined Snuka on the outside but was prevented from re-entering the ring due to Lee kicking her. In the end, Lee applied the Black Widow on Naomi, who submitted, to retain the title. WWE reported that Lee won by moving Naomi's hand unto the mat to deceive the referee into thinking that Naomi had submitted.

=== Main event ===
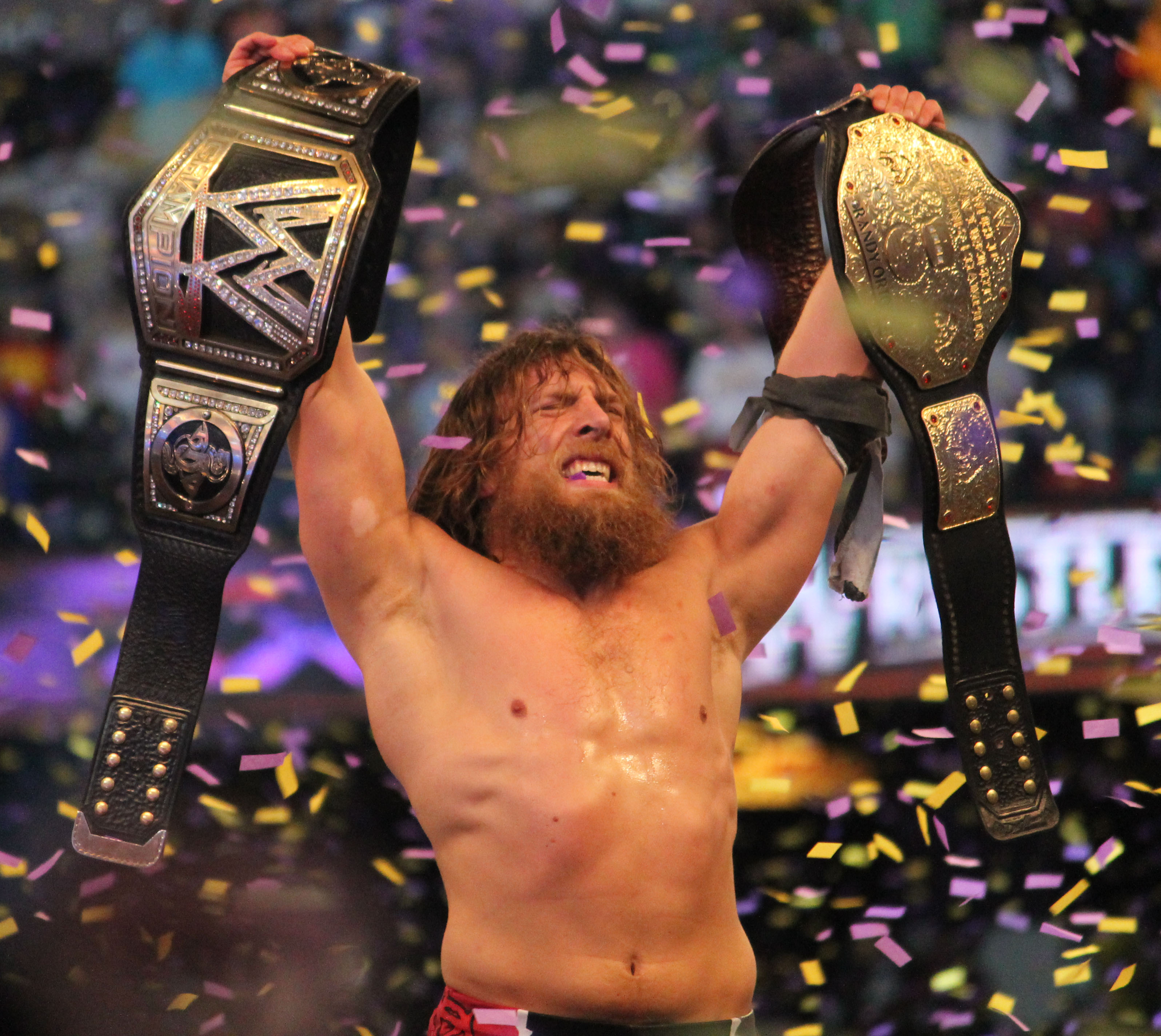
Daniel Bryan celebrated his WWE World Heavyweight Championship victory, closing the pay-per-view.

In the main event, Randy Orton defended the WWE World Heavyweight Championship against Daniel Bryan and Batista. During the match, Orton began to target Bryan's injured arm to momentarily neutralize him. Later, as Bryan applied the Yes! Lock on Orton, Triple H and Stephanie McMahon emerged from backstage and pulled the referee out of the ring. Triple H then sent in referee Scott Armstrong on his behalf, distracting Bryan. Batista took advantage and performed the Batista Bomb on Bryan for a nearfall. Bryan kicked Armstrong in the head, following with a suicide dive out of the ring onto Triple H, Stephanie, and Armstrong. Triple H obtained a sledgehammer, however, Bryan snatched it and used the sledgehammer on Triple H, knocking him off the ring apron and ending Triple H and Stephanie McMahon's interference in the match. Batista performed a Batista Bomb on Bryan onto the Spanish announce table, while Orton immediately combined with an inverted version of an RKO. Medical personnel arrived and carted Bryan away on a stretcher, however, Bryan refused medical attention and continued the match. In the climax, Orton performed an RKO on Batista for a near fall. Orton attempted to perform a punt kick to Batista, but Bryan performed a running knee on Orton, only for Batista to toss Bryan out of the ring and pin Orton instead, which resulted in a near fall. A frustrated Batista then performed a Batista Bomb on Orton, who rolled out of the ring. Bryan then performed a running knee on Batista and applied the "Yes! Lock". Batista fought the hold but eventually had to submit, giving the win and the title to Bryan. The pay-per-view ended with Bryan celebrating his win, including fireworks, confetti, pyrotechnics and Bryan leading the crowd in a "Yes!" chant.

== Reception ==
The event was a critical and commercial success. On the day of the event, WWE claimed that the event had drawn $10.9 million in ticket revenue at the Mercedes-Benz Superdome in New Orleans with an attendance figure of 75,167. WWE also claimed it was the fifth consecutive year that WrestleMania broke the host venue's highest-grossing entertainment event record. Within a week of the event, WWE management and New Orleans city officials declared WrestleMania XXX to be a big success, with SMG general manager Alan Freeman declaring that New Orleans "certainly would like to host the event again ... anything after 2018 is probably open at this point". WWE later claimed that WrestleMania XXX had a $142.2 million economic impact on New Orleans, generated $24.3 million in local taxes and that 79% of attendees were from outside of New Orleans. The figures were higher than those of the previous two WrestleManias.

The day after the event, WWE revealed that the initial number of WWE Network subscribers was 667,287, therefore that was the maximum number of people who could have watched the event on the WWE Network. Bandwidth optimizing company Qwilt reported that WrestleMania XXX led to WWE accounting for 6.5% of all online video traffic in North America on that day, ranking third below Netflix and YouTube but above Amazon, Hulu, and HBO. WrestleMania XXX generated 20 times more traffic for the WWE Network than what the Network would have gained on a regular day at the time. On April 15, WWE announced "nearly 400,000 domestic PPV buys" for the event, while the previous year's WrestleMania (before the existence of the WWE Network) had earned 1,039,000 buys. In June 2014, WWE reported 690,000 total buys from both domestic and international sources.

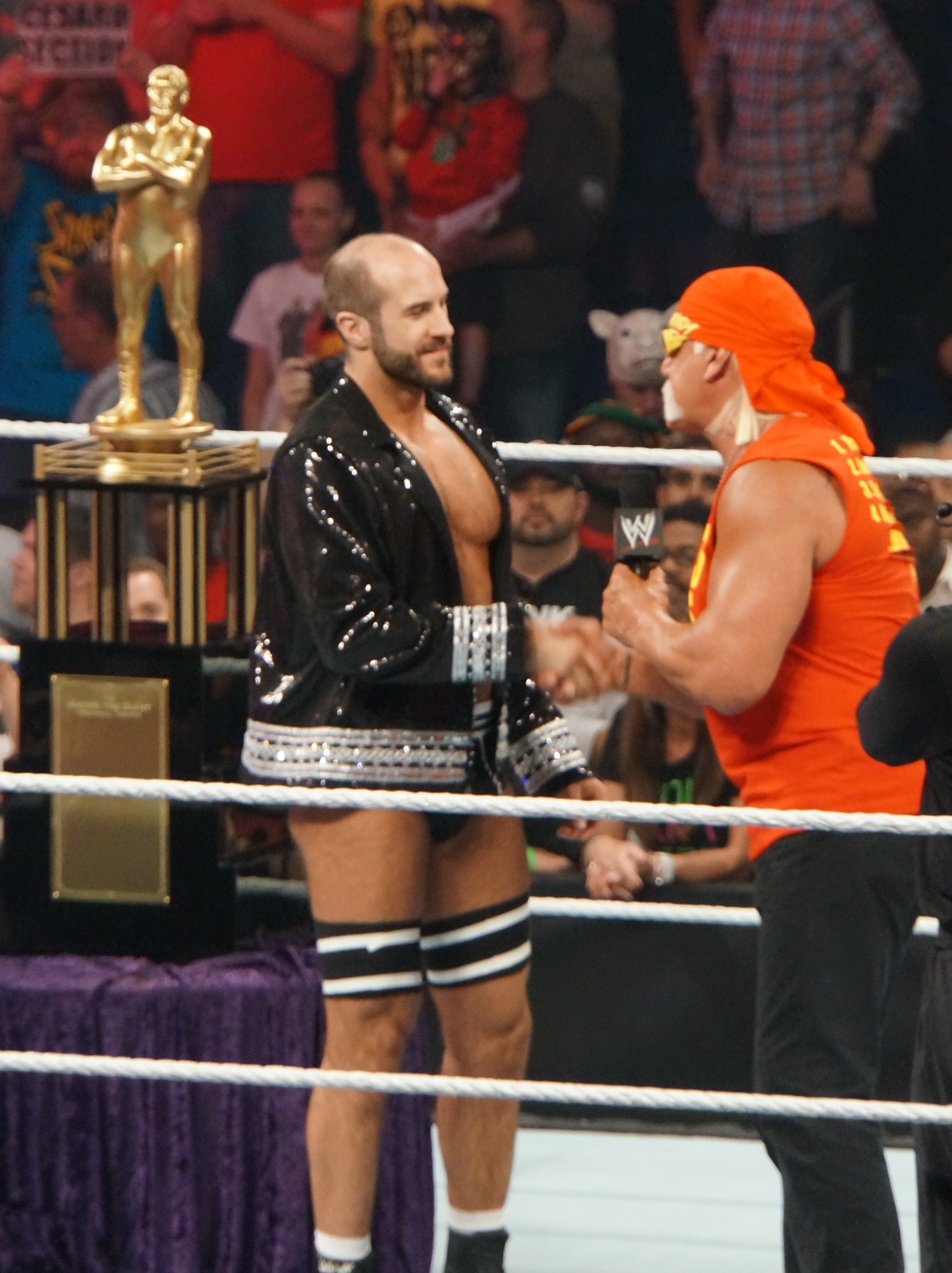
Cesaro's battle royal win was highlighted by the Associated Press. Hulk Hogan later endorsed Cesaro on the post-WrestleMania Raw.

The Associated Press article on WrestleMania XXX focused on Hulk Hogan's hosting of the event, commenting that "the Hulkster showed he can host, 30 years later." Hogan was "overseeing the mayhem for 75,000-plus fans, and countless more watching on TV ... and what a scene it was", referring to Cesaro winning the Andre the Giant battle royal "by heaving the sizeable Big Show over the top rope". Brock Lesnar's win over the Undertaker was simply described as "the night's shocker".

The Times-Picayune reported on the event, with Daniel Bryan's win of the WWE World Heavyweight Championship win being profiled on the front page with the headline "YES, INDEED!". Gene Guillot of The Times-Picayune also reviewed the event; describing it as "spectacular" and that it "delivered three memorable moments, one for each X". Regarding the setup, Guillot wrote that "the set was magnificent, the pyro and lighting impeccable and the pageantry unparalleled". Guillot described the first moment which started the show as "classic" when "the three biggest stars in the history of the business were in the same ring"; The Rock, Hulk Hogan and Stone Cold Steve Austin. Next, Guillot wrote that "the second indelible moment nearly stopped the show", describing the end of the Undertaker's Streak as "the biggest surprise ending in WrestleMania history—and maybe even wrestling history". Finally, the third moment which closed the show was "Bryan holding and hoisting in unison the two championships that represent the WWE World Heavyweight Championship while on his knees in the ring", which Guillot predicted "will go down among the greatest moments in WrestleMania history".

Nolan Howell of Slam! Wrestling commented that "WrestleMania XXX brings the beginning and end of eras". His star ratings out of 5 stars (*****) for each match are as follows; *** for the pre-show match, ****1/2 for Bryan-HHH, **1/2 for the Shield's match, **3/4 for the battle royal, **** for Cena-Wyatt, ** for Undertaker-Lesnar, 0.75 stars for the Divas' match and lastly ***3/4 for the main event. Overall, he gave the event 4.5 out of 5 stars.

Dave Meltzer of the Wrestling Observer Newsletter summed up WrestleMania XXX as a "very newsworthy show to say the least". Daniel Bryan's first match was described as a long technical one, and although Meltzer did not consider it "a match of the year or probably even the week", it "was the caliber of a good PPV main event". Triple H's post-match attack on Bryan was said to be a "very basic" storyline "but it's also exactly what they should have done". Bryan's second match in the main event was described as "really great" with many twists and turns, while the match result was "again exactly what they should have done" and "the crowd reacted the way you would expect". Meltzer thought that "the people just weren't into" the Undertaker's match as "nobody bought that Lesnar could win". Meanwhile, he felt that the Undertaker's departure was "certainly teased like a retirement". For the battle royal, Meltzer noted the lack of (surprise) entrants such as Rob Van Dam, Alexander Rusev, Christian, or Wade Barrett. In other notes, Meltzer described the strong fan support for Cesaro and also labeled Cena's win as a "genuine upset".

Justin LaBar of the Pittsburgh Tribune-Review summed up WrestleMania XXX as "shocking", but "one of the best". LaBar commented that he was "bored" with the Undertaker's match, just waiting for the final stretch as "Undertaker was going to win anyway". When Lesnar won, LaBar said that he had "never been part of a more real and emotionally driven moment". LaBar also commented that "Antonio Cesaro is here to stay" and described WWE as "the ultimate puppet master" because "Daniel Bryan finally wins the world title and it still isn't the top story from that event."

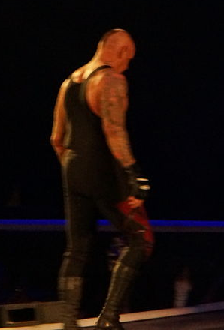
Pro Wrestling Torch described the end of The Undertaker's Streak as "one of the most shocking and depressing moments in WWE history".

Benjamin Tucker of the Pro Wrestling Torch Newsletter attended the event, and he scored the event 8.75 out of 10. He stated, that WrestleMania XXX "served as an event meant to respect the past while looking forward to the future" just like WrestleMania XX, with wrestlers like Bryan and Cesaro "spotlighted as the future of WWE". However, Tucker noted that "saying goodbye to the past proved harder than anyone could imagine" with the end of the Undertaker's Streak. He said this, and not WrestleMania 28, was the true "End of an Era" but Tucker did not "think it could have ended on a worse note" with over 15 minutes of "slow, subpar action". Tucker commented that the lack of hype before the event of the Streak being in jeopardy made it less of a defining moment when Lesnar broke it and more of "an indictment on whoever okay'ed the decision to let this happen". However, "Bryan was there to save the day" with two well-executed matches, making those in "attendance momentarily forget about Taker and root for the underdog who was finally getting his chance to shine". Tucker praised the booking of the match as perfect with its numerous false finishes.

For the rest of the event, Tucker commented that Wyatt "lost nothing by losing, but Cena certainly lost a lot by winning. The man shows no weakness". Tucker also noted that the segment involving Hogan, Austin and the Rock was "meaningless, surreal and a lot of fun". Tucker concluded by saying that the event was "easily one of the best Manias of the last ten years" and that "the future certainly does look bright. If only we could have said our good-byes properly".

Reflecting in March 2016 just before WrestleMania 32, Luke Winkie of Sports Illustrated wrote that the WrestleMania XXX resulted in "pure, cathartic, we-have-this-moment forever joy".

In 2019, Troy L. Smith of cleveland.com released a list of the "50 greatest wrestling pay-per-views of all time" from every professional wrestling promotion in the world, with WrestleMania XXX ranked at number 20.

== Aftermath ==
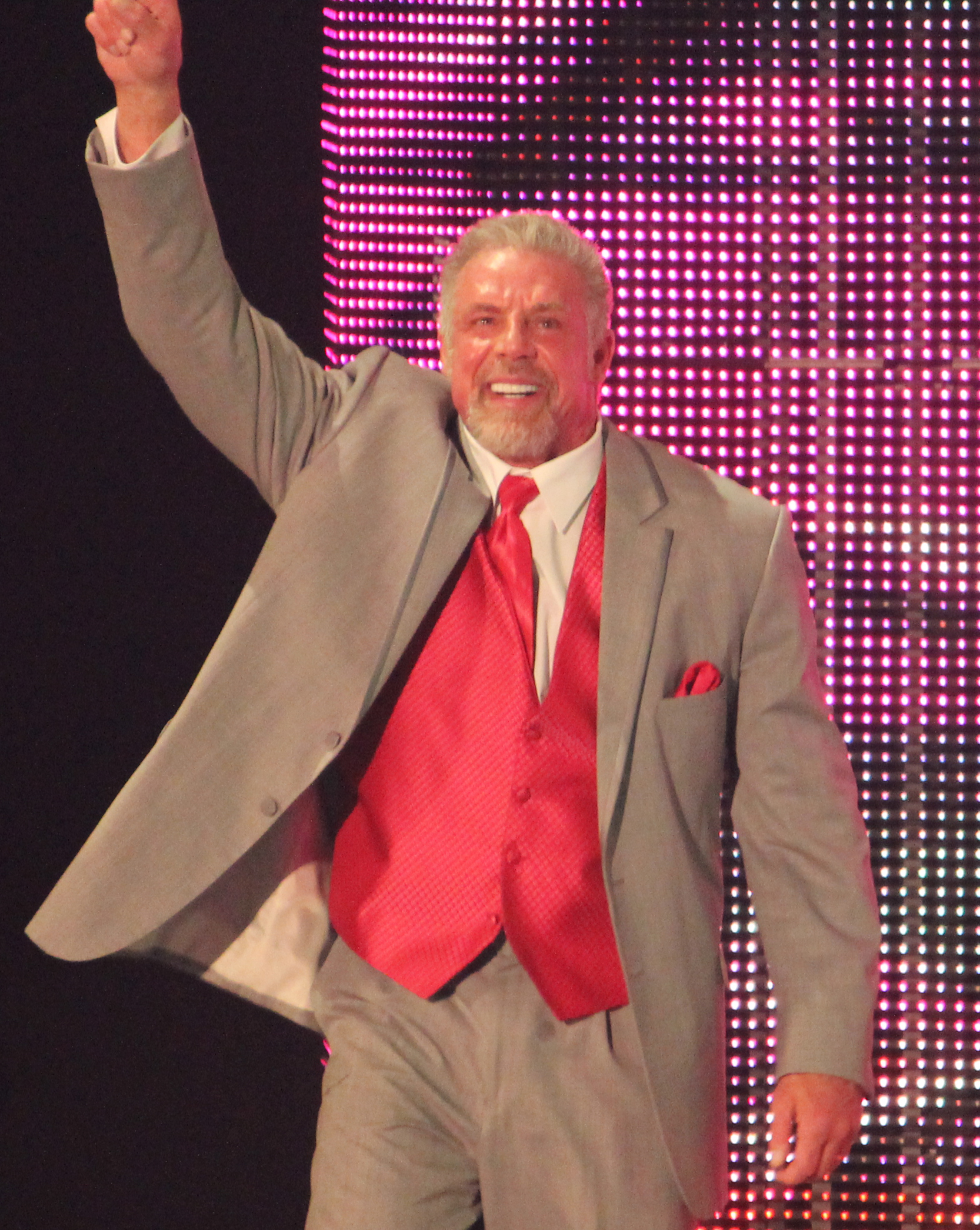
Ultimate Warrior's last public appearance on the post-WrestleMania Raw on April 7, 2014, the day before his death

Ultimate Warrior's first WrestleMania appearance since WrestleMania XII, headlining the unveiling of the 2014 Hall of Famers, would be his last. On April 8, the day after making his last public appearance on Raw to speak to the fans, Warrior suddenly collapsed and died at age 54 in Arizona. WWE paid tribute to Ultimate Warrior on the April 14 episode of Raw.

WWE held an online charity auction centered around WrestleMania XXX from March 31 to April 8, 2014. It raised over $400,000 for the Boys & Girls Clubs of America and New Orleans Saints quarterback Drew Brees's "The Brees Dream Foundation".

The Undertaker was reportedly taken away from the Superdome in an ambulance, which WWE later confirmed was due to him suffering a "severe concussion"; he was discharged the next day. In May 2014, Shawn Michaels said that WWE chairman Vince McMahon made the final decision to end the Undertaker's streak about four hours before WrestleMania XXX. McMahon confirmed in December 2014 that it was indeed him who made the final decision and that the Undertaker was initially shocked at the decision. The decision was made due to McMahon believing that it would make a huge deal out of Brock Lesnar to set up the next WrestleMania event. McMahon also said that he did not foresee other viable candidates on the roster to fill Lesnar's role within the near future.

=== Short-term ===
During the post-WrestleMania Raw the next night, Triple H immediately used his authority as WWE COO to grant himself a title match against WWE World Heavyweight Champion Daniel Bryan later that night. As Stephanie McMahon tried to persuade Randy Orton, Batista, Kane, and the Shield to help Triple H in his title match, Kane inadvertently revealed that Triple H was the mastermind behind the attack on the Shield on the previous month's SmackDown. As a result, Bryan was attacked by Orton, Batista, and Kane just before his title match, which began anyway at the order of Triple H. However, the title match ended in a no contest with Bryan retaining the title when the Shield interfered, attacked and chased away Triple H, Orton, Batista, and Kane.

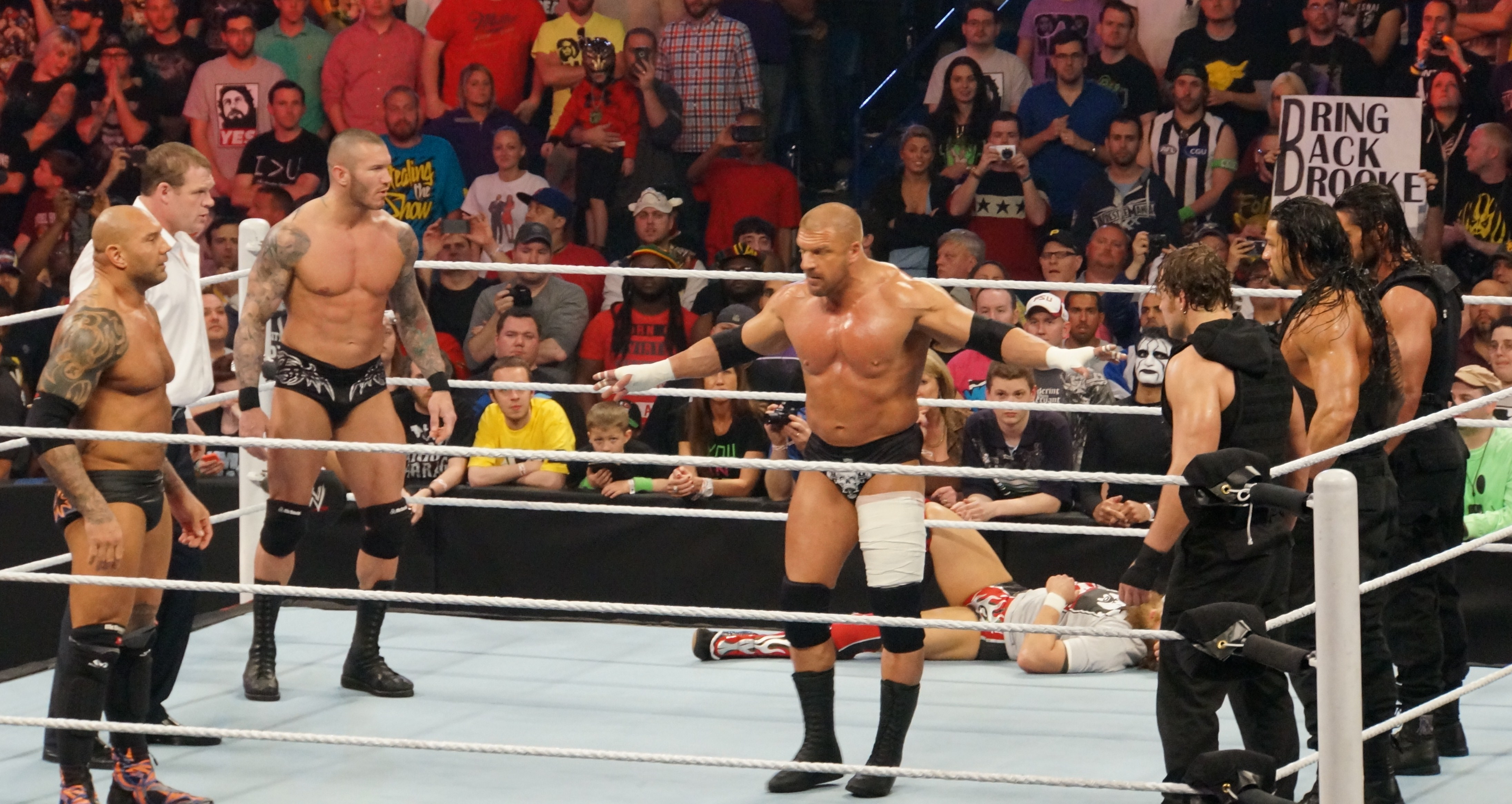
Heading into Extreme Rules, The Shield (right) would take on Evolution while Daniel Bryan (laying in the ring) would defend his title against Kane (in white shirt).

The following week, Triple H, Orton, and Batista reformed Evolution to take on the Shield. Meanwhile, Stephanie McMahon enticed Kane to return to his masked self; Kane complied and was granted a future title match against Bryan, and proceeded to carry out attacks against Bryan and his wife, Brie Bella. At the Extreme Rules pay-per-view, the Shield defeated Evolution while Bryan defeated Kane in an Extreme Rules match to retain the WWE World Heavyweight Championship.

The rivalry between John Cena and Bray Wyatt continued. At Extreme Rules, Wyatt defeated Cena in a Steel Cage match, after interference from the rest of the Wyatt Family and a demonic child.

Also on the post-WrestleMania Raw, Cesaro was endorsed by Hulk Hogan, who presented him with the Andre the Giant battle royal trophy. Cesaro went on to reveal that he found a new manager in Paul Heyman, who would replace Zeb Colter. Cesaro was attacked by his former partner, Jack Swagger, who dismantled Cesaro's trophy. Swagger later cost Cesaro his match against Rob Van Dam in the semi-finals of the Intercontinental Championship #1 contender tournament, while Van Dam later lost in the tournament final due to Cesaro's interference. At Extreme Rules, Cesaro defeated Swagger and Van Dam in an elimination match.

On the post-WrestleMania Raw, as WWE Divas Champion AJ Lee celebrated her successful title defense at WrestleMania, NXT Women's Champion Paige debuted on the main roster and congratulated Lee on her win. Lee reacted by slapping Paige and challenging her to an impromptu match with the Divas Championship on the line, resulting in Paige pulling out a quick surprise victory to capture the title.

=== Long-term ===
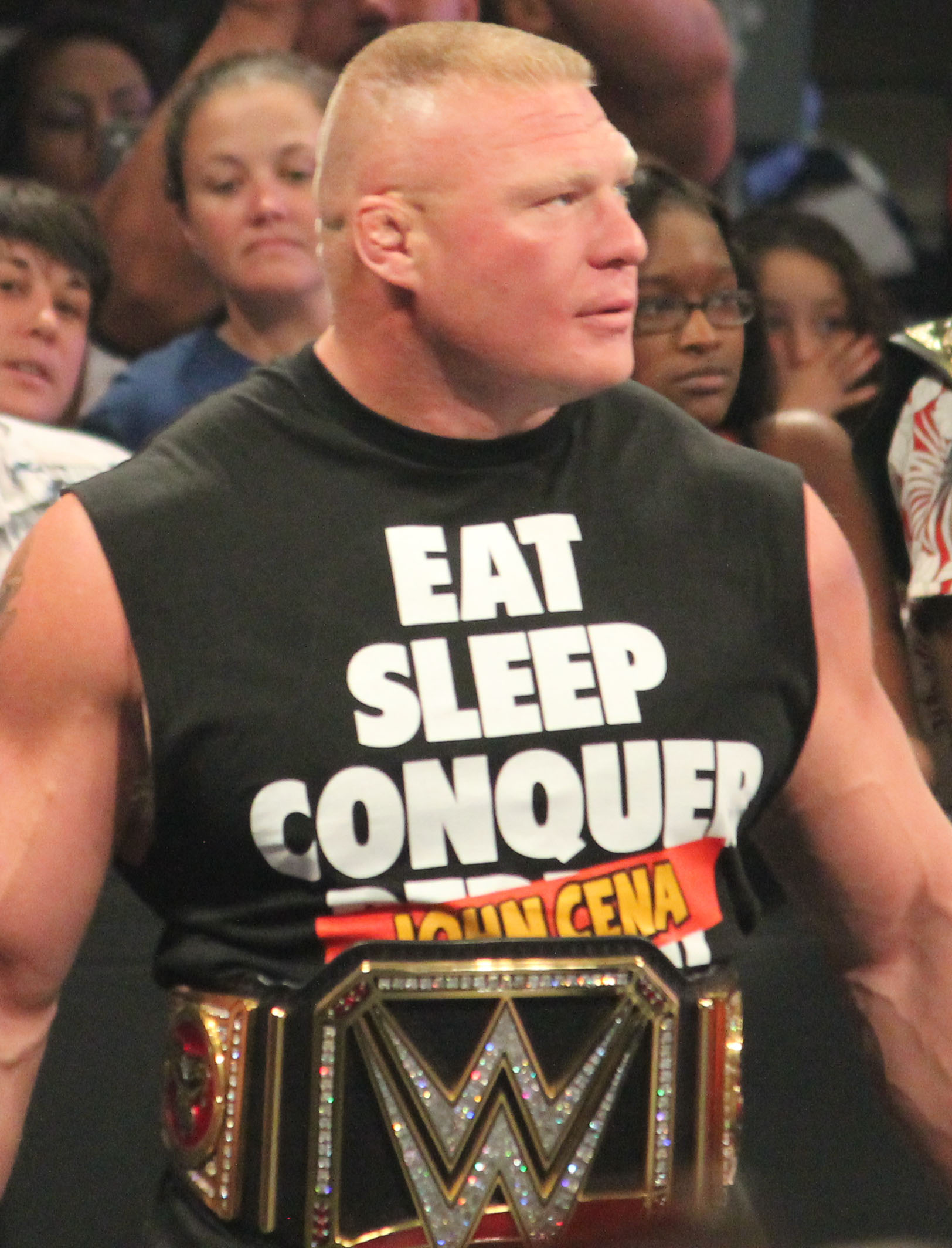
Brock Lesnar became WWE World Heavyweight Champion at SummerSlam in August.

Daniel Bryan announced on May 12 that due to injuries, he would require neck surgery, which he underwent on May 15. Bryan was stripped off the WWE World Heavyweight Championship by the Authority on June 9 as he was not healthy enough to defend his championship. Due to his injury, Bryan was largely removed from WWE television. John Cena's feud with Bray Wyatt culminated with a Last Man Standing match at Payback on June 1, where Cena buried Wyatt under multiple equipment cases to win the match and end the feud. Cena won Bryan's vacated WWE World Heavyweight Championship at Money in the Bank on June 29. Brock Lesnar returned on July 21 and proceeded to decisively defeat Cena at SummerSlam to capture the WWE World Heavyweight Championship.

At Payback, the Shield ended their feud with Evolution by defeating them in a six-man No Holds Barred elimination match. On the next Raw on June 2, Batista quit WWE in the storyline as Triple H, in wanting to continue the feud with the Shield, refused to grant Batista a one-on-one match for the WWE World Heavyweight title. Later that night, Seth Rollins turned on his Shield teammates and allied himself with Triple H's Authority, eventually winning the Money in the Bank briefcase. The remaining members of the Shield, Dean Ambrose and Roman Reigns, went their separate ways by the end of June. Cesaro ended his association with Paul Heyman in July on the night of Brock Lesnar's return. By that time, Cesaro had failed to win title matches for the WWE World Heavyweight Championship, the Intercontinental Championship, and the United States Championship.

At Night of Champions in September 2014, the Usos' tag title reign ended at the hands of Gold and Stardust. Also at the event, AJ Lee became a three-time Divas Champion by capturing the title from Paige. Paige and AJ had exchanged the Divas Championship several times after WrestleMania, firstly on the June 30 episode of Raw and secondly at SummerSlam.

In January 2015, Daniel Bryan returned to the ring having recovered from his injury. That month at the Royal Rumble event, Brock Lesnar retained his title in a triple threat match against John Cena and Seth Rollins; the New Age Outlaws' return to the ring saw them lose to the Ascension, while Roman Reigns won the Royal Rumble match. The live audience booed Reigns' win and Bryan's early elimination from the match. In February, Reigns defeated Bryan at Fastlane to receive a WrestleMania main event title match against Lesnar, while Cesaro and Tyson Kidd won the Tag Team Championship from the Usos.

At WrestleMania 31 on March 29, 2015, the main event began as a singles match for champion Brock Lesnar against challenger Roman Reigns. Towards the end of the match, Seth Rollins cashed in his Money in the Bank contract to make it a triple threat match; Rollins pinned Reigns shortly after to capture the WWE World Heavyweight Championship. In other matches, Daniel Bryan wrestled in the pay-per-view opener, a seven-man ladder match, and won the Intercontinental Championship from Bad News Barrett. Next, Rollins lost a singles match to Randy Orton. Then, Triple H defeated Sting in another singles match. A tag match followed where AJ Lee teamed with Paige to defeat Nikki Bella and Brie Bella. Next, Cena scored another WrestleMania victory, this time at the expense of Rusev, while Cena captured the United States Championship. In the penultimate match, the Undertaker (in his return to TV) defeated Bray Wyatt. On the pre-show, Cesaro and Tyson Kidd successfully defended the tag titles, while Big Show won the second Andre the Giant memorial battle royal.

The Undertaker reignited his feud with Brock Lesnar at Battleground by causing a no contest for his WWE World Heavyweight Championship match against Seth Rollins and then proceeded to controversially defeat Lesnar in a rematch at SummerSlam. The feud ended at the 2015 Hell in a Cell event with Lesnar defeating Undertaker in a Hell in a Cell match.

A fictionalised version of WrestleMania XXX was depicted in the film Fighting with My Family (2019), a biopic of the wrestler Paige.

== Results ==
No.	Results	Stipulations	Times
1^{P}	The Usos (Jey Uso and Jimmy Uso) (c) defeated Los Matadores (Diego and Fernando) (with El Torito), The Real Americans (Cesaro and Jack Swagger) (with Zeb Colter) and RybAxel (Curtis Axel and Ryback) by pinfall	Fatal four-way tag team elimination match for the WWE Tag Team Championship	16:13
2	Daniel Bryan defeated Triple H (with Stephanie McMahon) by pinfall	Singles match The winner was added to the WWE World Heavyweight Championship match in the main event.	25:58
3	The Shield (Dean Ambrose, Roman Reigns, and Seth Rollins) defeated Kane and The New Age Outlaws (Billy Gunn and Road Dogg) by pinfall	Six-man tag team match	2:56
4	Cesaro won by last eliminating Big Show (Note: Order of elimination from first eliminated: Yoshi Tatsu, Brad Maddox, Brodus Clay, The Great Khali, Zack Ryder, Darren Young, Drew McIntyre, Jinder Mahal, Heath Slater, Mark Henry, Titus O'Neil, The Miz, Santino Marella, Xavier Woods, Damien Sandow, Justin Gabriel, David Otunga, Big E, Fandango, R-Truth, Sin Cara, Tyson Kidd, Goldust, Cody Rhodes, Rey Mysterio, Kofi Kingston, Dolph Ziggler, Alberto Del Rio, Sheamus, and Big Show.)	31-man André the Giant Memorial Battle Royal for the André the Giant Memorial Trophy	13:25
5	John Cena defeated Bray Wyatt (with Erick Rowan and Luke Harper) by pinfall	Singles match	22:25
6	Brock Lesnar (with Paul Heyman) defeated The Undertaker by pinfall	Singles match	25:12
7	AJ Lee (c) defeated Aksana, Alicia Fox, Brie Bella, Cameron, Emma, Eva Marie, Layla, Naomi, Natalya, Nikki Bella, Rosa Mendes, Summer Rae, and Tamina Snuka by submission	Vickie Guerrero Invitational match for the WWE Divas Championship	6:48
8	Daniel Bryan defeated Batista and Randy Orton (c) by submission	Triple threat match for the WWE World Heavyweight Championship	23:20
(c) / – the champion(s) heading into the match; P / – the match was broadcast on the pre-show

=== WWE Tag Team Championship Fatal 4-Way match eliminations ===
Eliminated	Team	Wrestler	Eliminated by	Method	Time
1	Los Matadores	Diego	Jack Swagger	Submission	5:40
2	RybAxel	Curtis Axel	Cesaro	Pinfall	11:43
3	The Real Americans	Cesaro	The Usos	Pinfall	16:13
Winners	The Usos (c)	—N/a			16:13
