= Let the Good Times Roll =

Let the Good Times Roll may refer to:

- "Let the Good Times Roll" (Shirley and Lee song), a 1956 song by Shirley and Lee
- "Let the Good Times Roll" (Louis Jordan song), a 1946 song by Louis Jordan and his Tympany Five
- "Let the Good Times Roll", a 2003 song by Layo & Bushwacka!
- Let the Good Times Roll (album), a 1999 album by B.B. King
- "Good Times Roll", 1978 song by The Cars
- "Good Times Roll", a parody of "Lucy in the Sky with Diamonds" from The Rutles soundtrack
- "Good Times" (Sam Cooke song), also known as "Let the Good Times Roll"
- "Come On" (Earl King song), also known as "Come On (Let the Good Times Roll)", covered by the Jimi Hendrix Experience
- Let the Good Times Roll (film), a 1973 film featuring Bill Haley and the Comets, Chuck Berry and others
- Let the Good Times Roll, a caramel corn-scented face and body cleanser made by LUSH Cosmetics.
- Let the Good Times Roll (musical), a 2025 jukebox musical

== See also ==
- Laissez les bons temps rouler
- Let the Bad Times Roll, a 2021 album by the Offspring
