= The Shield (professional wrestling) =

Professional wrestling stable

- WWE merchandise logo

Stable
- Name: The Shield
- Members: Dean Ambrose; Roman Reigns; Seth Rollins
- Combined billed weight: 707 lb (321 kg)
- Debut: November 18, 2012
- Disbanded: April 21, 2019
- Years active: 2012–2014; 2017–2018; 2019

The Shield was a professional wrestling stable in WWE that consisted of Dean Ambrose, Roman Reigns, and Seth Rollins. The group debuted as heels on November 18, 2012, at the Survivor Series pay-per-view. The Shield was a dominant force in six-man tag team matches with an undefeated televised streak lasting from December 2012 to May 2013, during which they scored a victory at WrestleMania 29. In May 2013 at Extreme Rules, all three members of The Shield won a championship, with Ambrose winning the United States Championship while Rollins and Reigns captured the WWE Tag Team Championship. Rollins and Reigns were WWE Tag Team Champions until October 2013, and Ambrose was United States Champion until May 2014, which was a record reign for the WWE version of the championship. As a Shield member, Reigns gained prominence by setting and equaling elimination records at the 2013 Survivor Series and the 2014 Royal Rumble events.

The Shield at various points served as hired guns for CM Punk and The Authority while later going on to face their former employers in separate feuds. They wrestled in the main event of numerous Raw and SmackDown television shows and headlined one pay-per-view, the 2014 Payback event, which was their final match as a trio until 2017. Rollins left the group on June 2, when he attacked Ambrose and Reigns with a chair and sided with The Authority. Ambrose and Reigns went on their own ways as singles wrestlers later that month, marking the end of The Shield.

Following the group's dissolution, each member of The Shield went on to become a world champion. All three reigned as WWE World Heavyweight Champion within a three-minute span at the end of the 2016 Money in the Bank event: Rollins defeated Reigns for the championship and then Ambrose cashed in his Money in the Bank briefcase (which he won earlier that night) on Rollins to win the title.

In the lead-up to the 2017 SummerSlam event, Ambrose and Rollins reunited and captured the Raw Tag Team Championship from Cesaro and Sheamus. Then on the October 9 episode of Raw, the trio reunited to feud with The Miz, Cesaro and Sheamus. In December 2017, the team dissolved once again after Ambrose suffered an injury. Following Ambrose's return from injury the previous week, The Shield reunited once again on August 20, 2018, episode of Raw to prevent Braun Strowman from cashing in his Money in the Bank contract on Reigns. However, in October that same year, The Shield disbanded following Reigns' hiatus over his leukemia rediagnosis and Ambrose's betrayal towards Rollins. After Reigns returned in February 2019 and announced that his leukemia was in remission, the trio reunited and won the main event match of Fastlane that same month. Although this was promoted as The Shield's final match together, they reunited at the special event The Shield's Final Chapter, Ambrose's final WWE match due to not renewing his contract.

== History ==
=== Original run (2012–2014) ===
==== Mercenaries for CM Punk ====
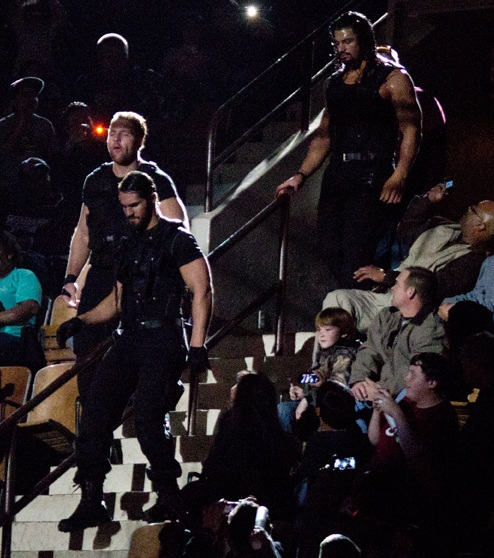
The Shield made their entrance by the arena steps

Ambrose, Reigns, and Rollins were part of the NXT developmental system in 2012, where Rollins was the NXT Champion. The trio made their main roster debut on November 18 at Survivor Series, ambushing Ryback during the triple threat main event to help CM Punk pin John Cena and retain the WWE Championship. On the November 26 episode of Raw, they introduced themselves as a group fighting against "injustices". Although they denied working for Punk or his manager Paul Heyman, The Shield repeatedly targeted Punk's rivals in the weeks that followed. Their actions led to their in-ring debut at TLC: Tables, Ladders & Chairs on December 16, where they defeated Ryback and Team Hell No in a six-man TLC match.

In the weeks after, The Shield continued targeting top performers such as Ric Flair, Sheamus, and Randy Orton. Around the same time, they also appeared in NXT, with Ambrose and Reigns supporting Rollins during his NXT Championship defenses.

On the January 7 episode of Raw, The Shield again assisted Punk by attacking Ryback during a WWE Championship TLC match. Two weeks later, they attacked The Rock, prompting Mr. McMahon to warn that any interference in Punk's upcoming title defense at the Royal Rumble would cost him the championship. Despite Punk publicly distancing himself from the group, The Shield attacked The Rock during a blackout at the Royal Rumble, allowing Punk to retain. However, McMahon restarted the match, and The Rock ultimately won the title. The next night on Raw, it was revealed that The Shield had been secretly working under the direction of Paul Heyman all along.

==== Undefeated streak ====
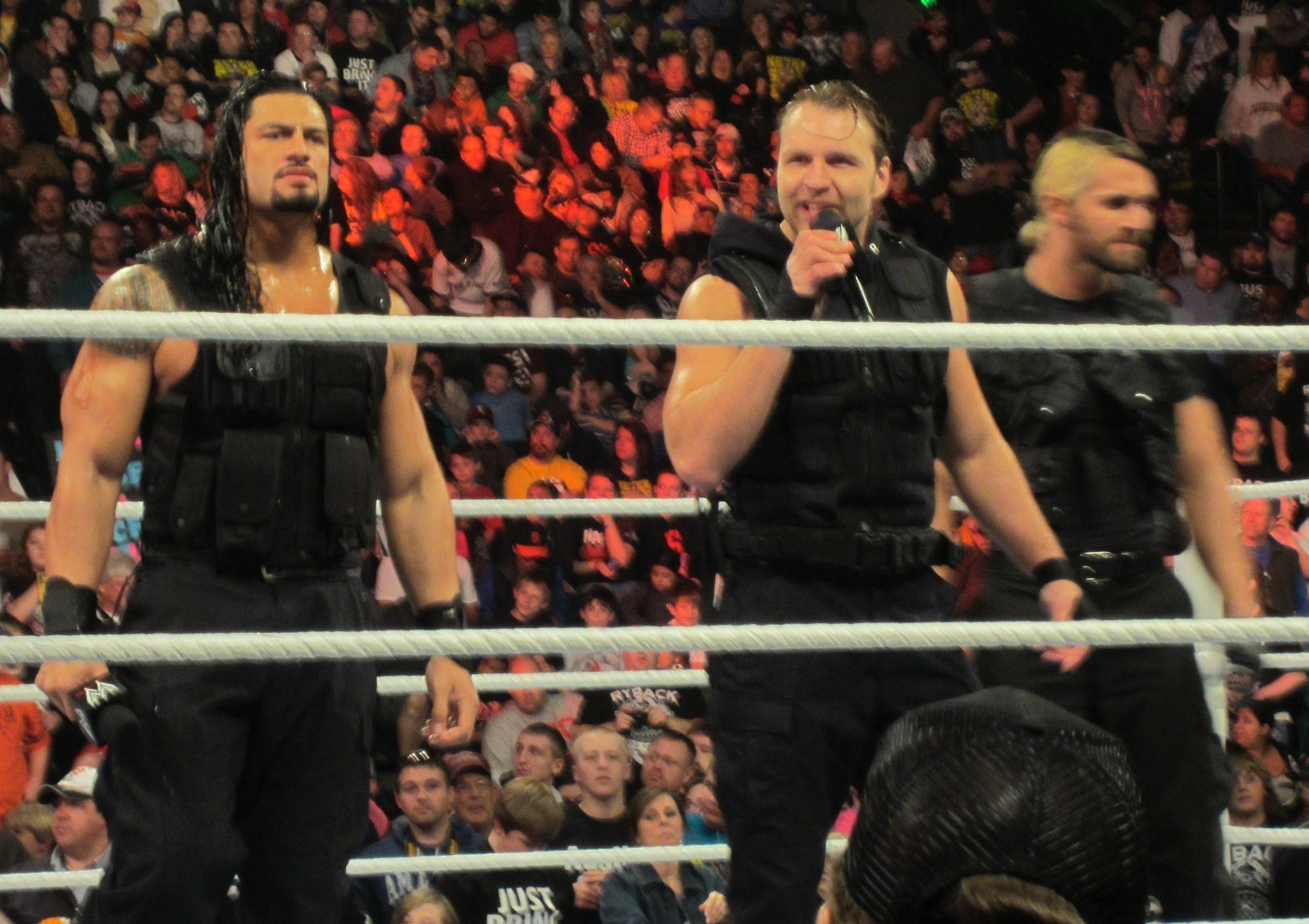
The Shield addresses the crowd during Raw in February 2013

On the January 28 episode of Raw, The Shield attacked John Cena, along with Sheamus and Ryback when they tried to intervene. This led to a six-man tag team match at Elimination Chamber on February 17, where The Shield secured the win. Their rivalry with Sheamus continued, culminating in a match at WrestleMania 29, where they defeated Sheamus, Randy Orton, and Big Show.

In the weeks that followed, The Shield began targeting The Undertaker. After an attempted ambush on the April 8 episode of Raw was thwarted by Team Hell No, the two groups faced off in a six-man tag match on the April 22 episode of Raw, which The Shield won. They attacked The Undertaker again on the April 26 episode of SmackDown following his match with Ambrose. At Extreme Rules, Ambrose defeated Kofi Kingston for the United States Championship, while Reigns and Rollins captured the Tag Team Championship from Team Hell No. Their dominance was briefly halted on the June 14 episode of SmackDown, where their undefeated streak in televised six-man tag matches ended against Team Hell No and Randy Orton.

==== All champions and Triple H's enforcers ====
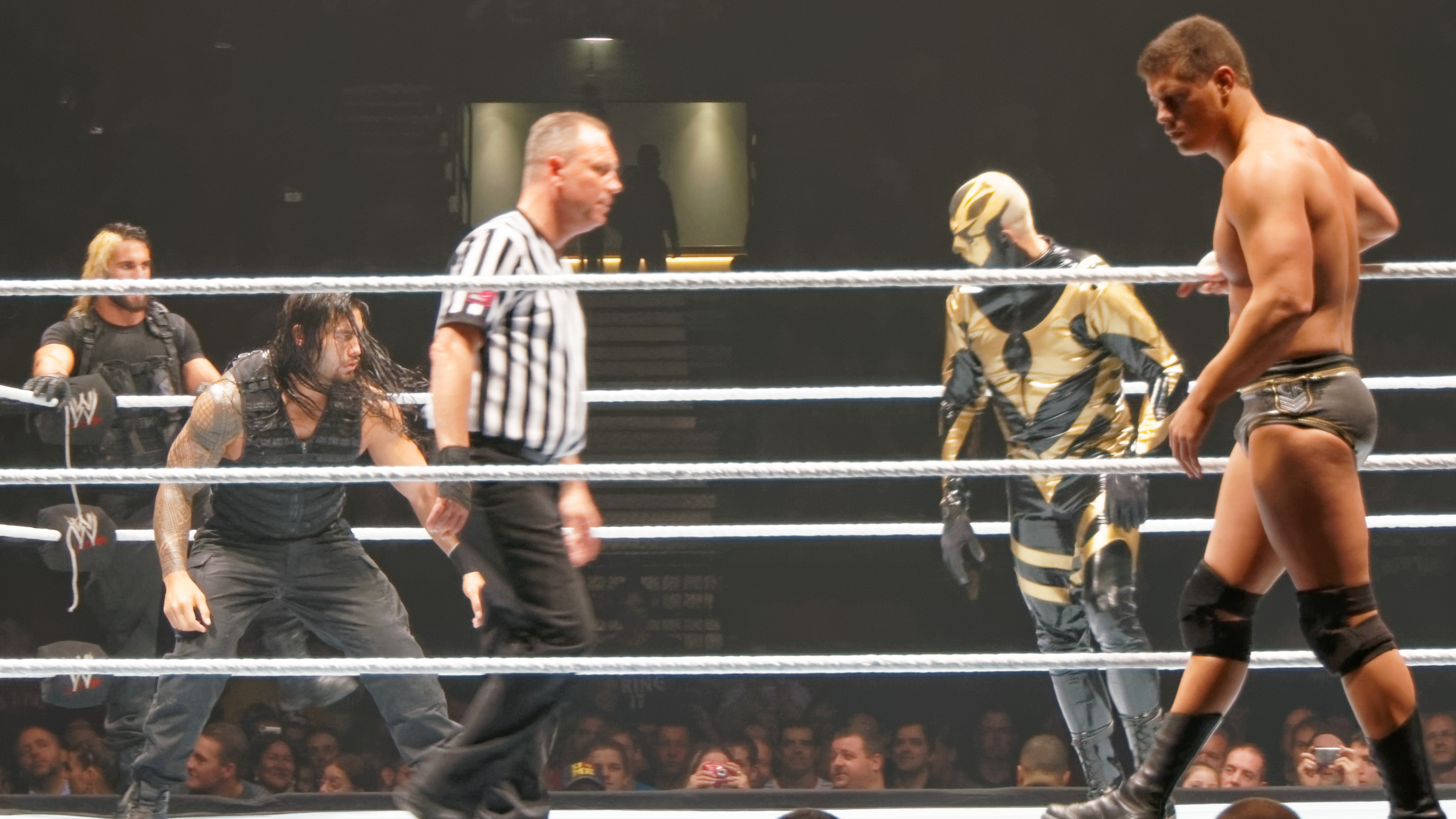
Rollins and Reigns lost their WWE Tag Team Championship to Cody Rhodes and Goldust

In August, The Shield began working as enforcers for Triple H and aligned themselves with The Authority. At Battleground in October, Cody Rhodes and Goldust defeated Reigns and Rollins in a non-title match, earning (in storyline) reinstatement to WWE. On the October 14 episode of Raw, Rollins and Reigns lost the Tag Team Championship to Rhodes and Goldust following interference from Big Show.

==== Cracks in The Shield ====
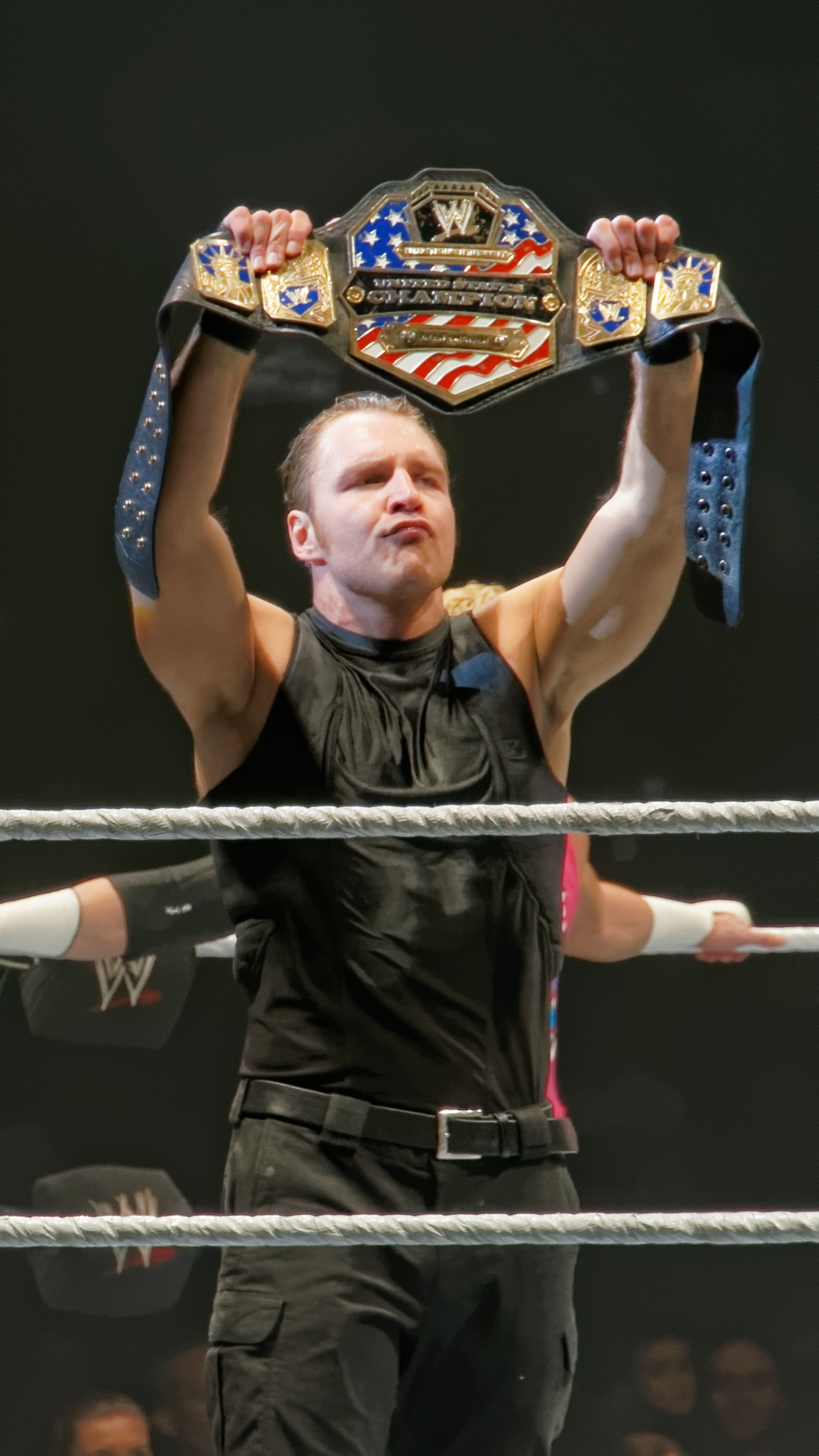
Dean Ambrose became the longest reigning United States Champion under the WWE banner at 351 days

The first seeds of dissension were sown in The Shield (especially between Ambrose and Reigns) with Ambrose's boasting of being the only member left with a championship, but from then on Ambrose was frequently pinned during The Shield's matches. At Survivor Series on November 24, The Shield teamed with The Real Americans (Antonio Cesaro and Jack Swagger) to defeat the team of Rey Mysterio, the Rhodes Brothers and The Usos in a Survivor Series elimination tag team match, with Ambrose being the first man eliminated.

In late November, they started a feud with CM Punk, leading to a handicap match between Punk and The Shield at TLC: Tables, Ladders & Chairs on December 15, which Punk won after capitalizing on The Shield's lack of co-ordination after Ambrose was accidentally speared by Reigns. WWE originally planned to break up The Shield after the match, but they asked to remain together due to their lack of experience as singles wrestlers.

Going into 2014, Punk's taunts increased tension between The Shield members, and Reigns emerged as the only Shield member to defeat Punk in a singles match on the January 6 episode of Raw, albeit with a distraction from Ambrose. All three members of The Shield competed in the 2014 Royal Rumble match, during which Ambrose tried to eliminate Reigns, who retaliated by eliminating both Ambrose and Rollins.

On the January 27 episode of Raw, The Shield faced Daniel Bryan, John Cena, and Sheamus in a qualifying match for the Elimination Chamber, but lost by disqualification following interference from The Wyatt Family. At the Elimination Chamber event on February 23, The Shield were defeated by The Wyatt Family. Tension within the group increased when, on the March 3 episode of Raw, they lost a rematch after poor teamwork led Rollins to walk out during the match.

==== Rebellion against The Authority ====
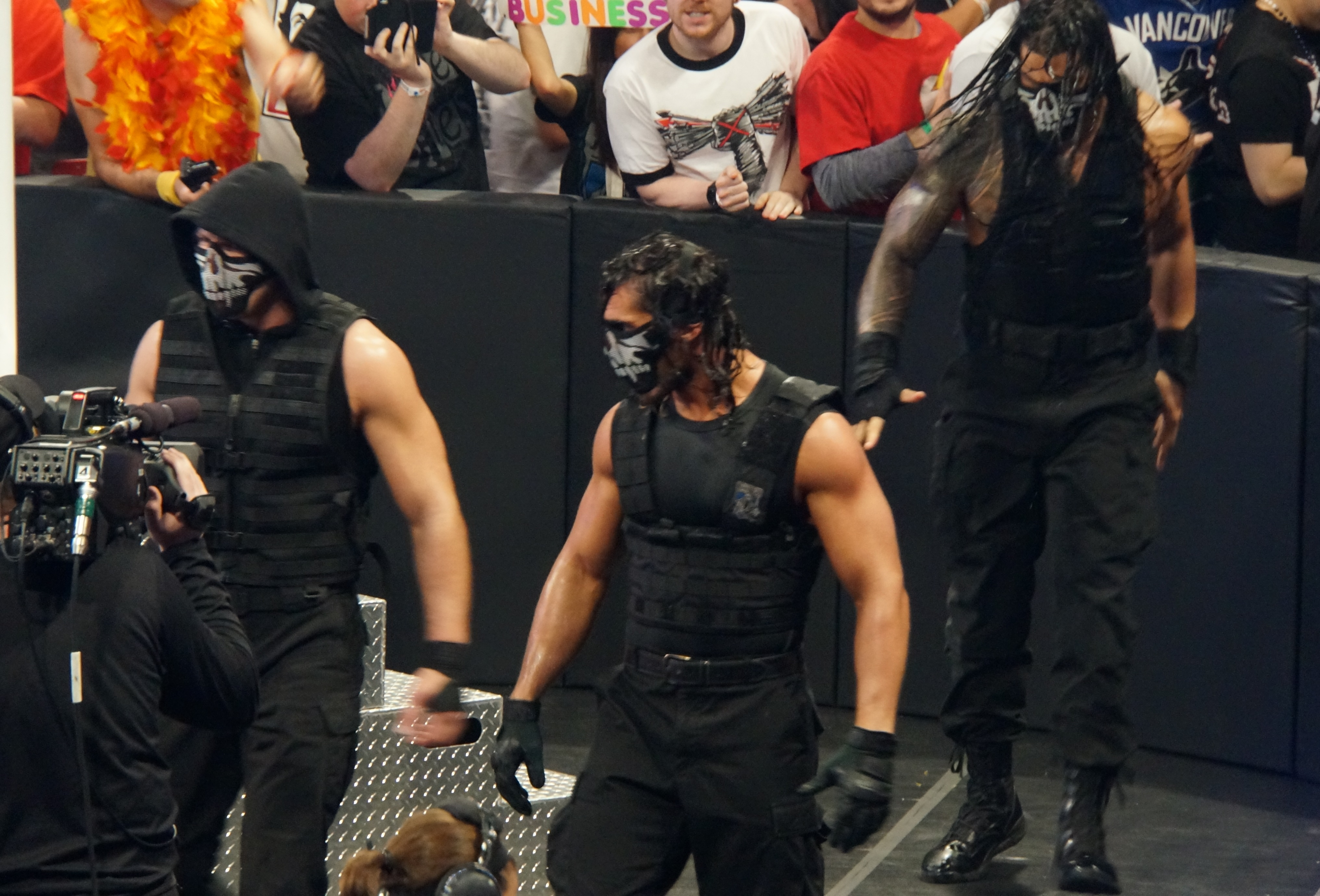
The Shield wore half-masks during an entrance in April 2014

On the March 7 episode of SmackDown, the members of The Shield met in the ring to clear the air on their disharmony, and Rollins explained that his actions achieved his purpose of getting Ambrose and Reigns to finally see eye-to-eye, which led to the trio ultimately reconciling.

On the March 17 episode of Raw, The Shield turned to babyfaces and feuded with Kane after refusing to assault Jerry Lawler. The feud also involved The Authority's The New Age Outlaws (Road Dogg and Billy Gunn) after they sided with Kane, culminating in a match at WrestleMania XXX, which The Shield would win. Authority leader Triple H then reunited his previous stable Evolution with Orton and Batista, and at Extreme Rules, The Shield defeated Evolution. The following night on Raw, Triple H forced Ambrose to defend the United States Championship in a 20-man battle royal without Reigns and Rollins being involved. (Though they were both outside the ring during the match, they could not physically interfere.) Ambrose would end up losing the title after he was the last wrestler eliminated in the match by Sheamus. At Payback, they defeated Evolution in a No Holds Barred elimination match, in which no Shield member was eliminated.

==== Rollins' betrayal and separation ====
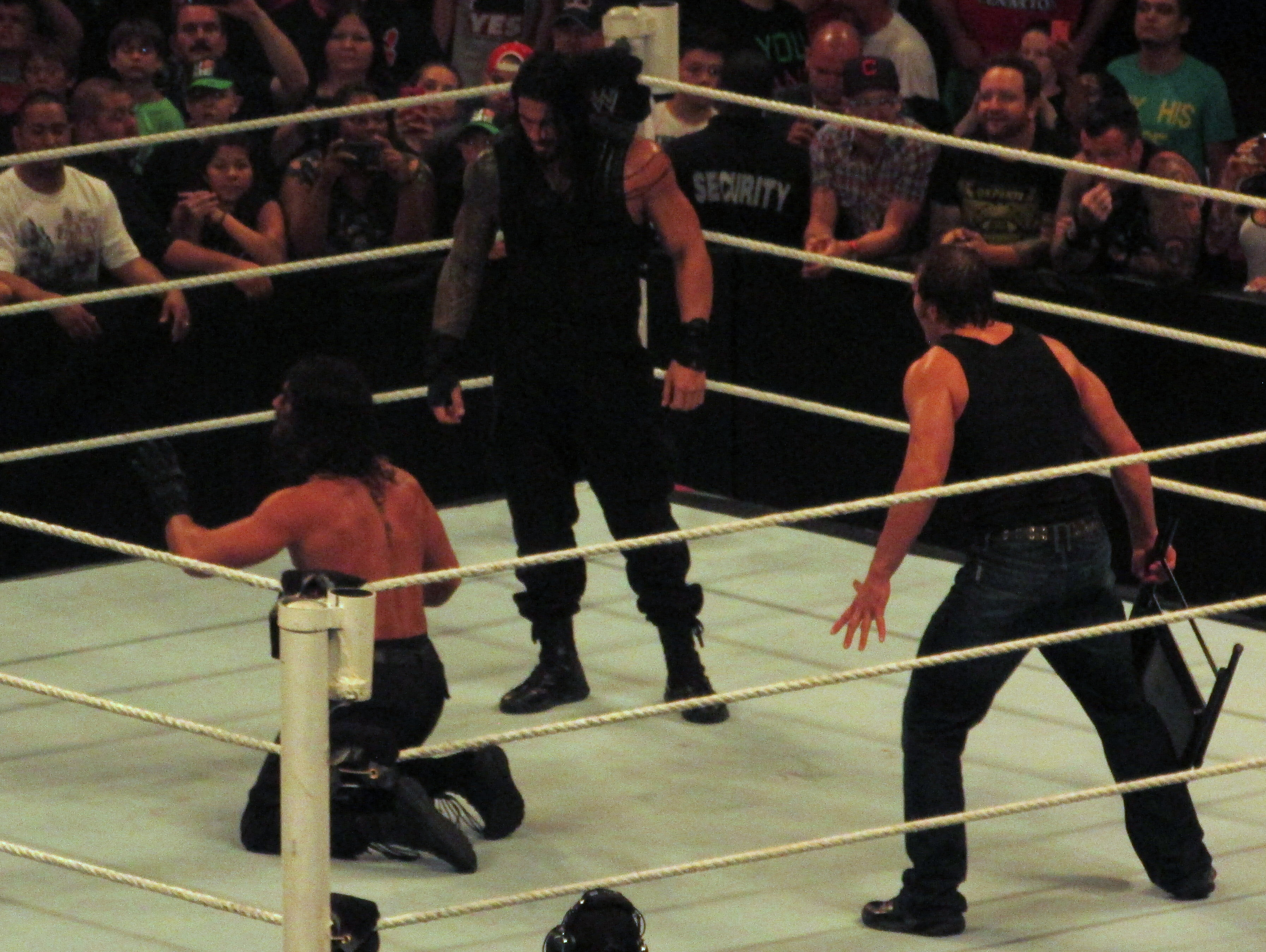
Following his split from The Shield, Rollins (left) is confronted by his former teammates

The following night on Raw, Triple H announced his intention to continue Evolution's feud with The Shield, but Batista quit WWE and left Evolution. Later that night with The Shield in the ring, Triple H's "plan B" for destroying The Shield turned out to be Rollins suddenly attacking Ambrose and Reigns with a steel chair, signalling Rollins re-alignment with The Authority. On the June 9 episode of Raw, Rollins described his betrayal as severing a business relationship and that he had destroyed "his own creation" to further his own interests, while Ambrose and Reigns (still labelled as The Shield) addressed Rollins' betrayal with Ambrose describing Rollins as a "cancer" in The Shield, while Reigns claimed that Rollins "committed the most unforgivable sin". Later that night, Ambrose and Reigns had their final match as The Shield, teaming up with John Cena to defeat The Wyatt Family.

While Ambrose and Reigns did not fall out with each other, they did begin to take separate paths as Ambrose declared his intention to take revenge on Rollins, while Reigns set his sights on the WWE World Heavyweight Championship. While the duo were still referred to as The Shield on the June 13 episode of SmackDown, Ambrose debuted new theme music, ring attire, and entrance on the June 16 episode of Raw. Reigns, however, largely retained The Shield's ring attire, theme music, and continued to enter the ring through the live audience. On the June 24 episode of Main Event, Reigns confirmed that he was on his own and no longer with The Shield, thus confirming that The Shield had dissolved.

=== Subsequent reunions (2017–2019) ===
==== 2017 ====
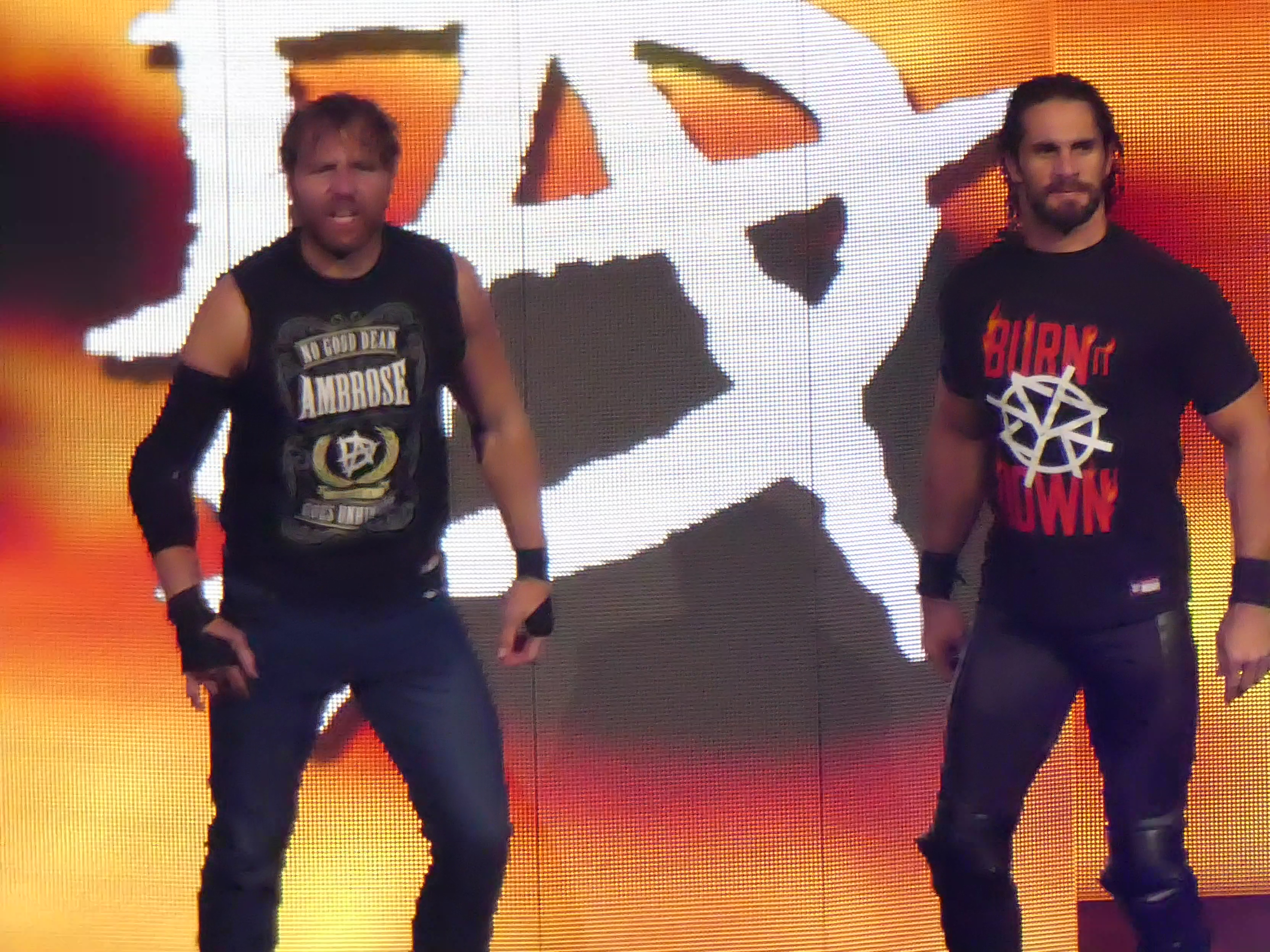
In August 2017, Ambrose and Rollins reformed as a tag team and were later joined by Reigns to fully reunite The Shield

Throughout July 2017, Ambrose, who was drafted to the Raw brand via the Superstar Shake-up, and Rollins teased a potential reunion between the two, but Ambrose continuously declined Rollins's offer to reunite, primarily due to trust issues from Rollins' betrayal three years prior.

On the July 31 episode of Raw, Rollins was confronted by Raw Tag Team Champions Cesaro and Sheamus, and later won a match against Sheamus after which the duo attacked Rollins before Ambrose came down to make the save, though backstage Ambrose told Rollins that he would not help him if Rollins got outnumbered again. The following week on Raw, after Rollins lost a rematch against Sheamus and was once again attacked after the match, Ambrose did not help him. Later that night, Ambrose defeated Cesaro, only to be subsequently attacked by the duo before being saved by Rollins. On the August 14 episode of Raw, an argument in the ring culminated in Ambrose and Rollins brawling with each other only to fight off Cesaro and Sheamus and performing a fist bump to a loud ovation. Rollins and Ambrose defeated the champions at SummerSlam, winning the titles.

Ambrose and Rollins reunited with Reigns, who had a feud with The Miz. On the October 9 episode of Raw, Miz opened the show with Cesaro and Sheamus, but they were interrupted by the reunited Shield, who attacked the trio, leading to a six-man tag team Tables, Ladders and Chairs match between The Shield and the team of Cesaro, The Miz and Sheamus at TLC: Tables, Ladders & Chairs. Later, Braun Strowman and Kane were added to the match as part of The Miz's team. However, Reigns was pulled out of the match on October 20 due to illness and Kurt Angle took his place.

At the event on October 22, Ambrose, Rollins and Angle won the match and Angle was officially considered a temporary part of the faction. Ambrose and Rollins lost the titles back to Cesaro and Sheamus after SmackDown's The New Day appeared and caused a distraction on the November 6 episode of Raw. Reigns returned the following week on Raw, and The Shield challenged The New Day to a match at Survivor Series on November 19, which they won. On the November 20 episode of Raw, Reigns won the Intercontinental Championship by defeating The Miz following a distraction by the other Shield members. In December 2017, Ambrose suffered a triceps injury and was written off TV, thus putting The Shield on a hiatus.

==== 2018 ====
On the August 13, 2018 episode of Raw, Ambrose returned from his injury and reunited with Rollins during his feud with Dolph Ziggler and Drew McIntyre. Rollins later regained the Intercontinental Championship from Ziggler, while Reigns won the Universal Championship from Brock Lesnar at SummerSlam. On the August 20 episode of Raw, Reigns retained the Universal Championship against Finn Bálor, with Braun Strowman watching from the entrance ramp. After the match, Strowman attempted to cash-in his Money in the Bank contract, however, Rollins and Ambrose made the save, preventing him from cashing in and putting him through the announce table with a triple powerbomb. At Hell in a Cell on September 16, Ziggler and McIntyre retained the Raw Tag Team Championship against Rollins and Ambrose, while Reigns and Strowman's Universal Championship Hell in a Cell match ended in a no contest following interference from Brock Lesnar. The Shield and the team of Strowman, Ziggler and McIntyre had a match at WWE Super Show-Down on October 6, where The Shield was victorious.

On October 22, 2018, episode of Raw, Reigns relinquished his Universal title due to real-life leukemia and later that night, Ambrose attacked Rollins after they won the Raw Tag Team Championship. Two weeks later, the AOP defeated Rollins in a handicap match to win the Raw Tag Team Championships, with Ambrose attacking Rollins after the match.

==== 2019 ====
In January 2019, WWE confirmed that Ambrose had declined to renew his contract, which was to expire in April. On the February 25, 2019 episode of Raw, Reigns returned from his leukemia and reunited with Rollins. Later that night, they assisted Ambrose during an attack from Elias, Bobby Lashley, Drew McIntyre and Baron Corbin. The following week, Ambrose saved Reigns and Rollins from McIntyre, Lashley and Corbin, after which the three performed their signature pose. On March 10, The Shield defeated the team of McIntyre, Lashley, and Corbin at Fastlane, which was promoted as the group's final match together.

Before the formal end of Ambrose's contract with WWE, The Shield made a final appearance during a WWE Network special event called The Shield's Final Chapter. In the main event, The Shield defeated Corbin, Lashley and McIntyre, in both the group and Ambrose's last match in WWE. Ambrose's contract expired on April 30, and he departed WWE to wrestle for All Elite Wrestling (AEW) and New Japan Pro-Wrestling (NJPW) under his former ring name Jon Moxley.

== Post-initial split and legacy ==
For the remainder of 2014, Ambrose and Rollins feuded with each other due to Rollins's betrayal and alliance with the Authority, whereas Reigns was quickly inserted into world title contention. Ambrose and Rollins's prolonged feud won Pro Wrestling Illustrated's Feud of the Year award for 2014. At the end of the year, Pro Wrestling Torch writer Shawn Valentino labelled The Shield as a "three-headed dragon" and the seventh top WWE story of the year, writing that The Shield "was one of the coolest acts in wrestling in recent years, and most fans believed they were broken up prematurely," adding that "each member of The Shield has made their mark, and they all look like they will be big stars in the future". Reigns won the 2015 Royal Rumble, earning a title match against Brock Lesnar at WrestleMania 31. During the match, Rollins cashed in his Money in the Bank contract and pinned Reigns to win the WWE World Heavyweight Championship.

Despite no longer formally operating as a team, Ambrose and Reigns continued to infrequently work together and maintained an on-screen friendship following The Shield's split. On the January 9, 2015 episode of SmackDown, Reigns was about to be put into a handicap match against Rollins and Big Show until Ambrose came to the aid of Reigns and helped defeat them, with the two continuously helping each other against The Authority thereafter. On the May 4 episode of Raw, Ambrose defeated Rollins in a non-title match and (as per a pre-match stipulation by the Director of Operations Kane) gained his first opportunity for the WWE World Heavyweight Championship, being added to the title match at Payback on May 17 and making it a fatal four-way match, also including Reigns and Randy Orton, who was pinned by Rollins. During the match, Ambrose, Reigns and Rollins briefly worked together to perform their signature triple powerbomb on Orton through the announce table. On May 31, Ambrose faced Rollins for the WWE World Heavyweight Championship at Elimination Chamber, where he won by disqualification. After the match, Reigns emerged to help Ambrose fend off an attack by The Authority. Despite the win, Ambrose did not gain the championship, but he still took the championship belt with him and challenged Rollins in a ladder match at Money in the Bank on June 14, which he lost.

After Rollins suffered multiple knee injuries in November, a tournament was set up to crown a new champion. The tournament began on the November 9 episode of Raw, involving 16 wrestlers and with the final match scheduled for Survivor Series to determine the new champion. At Survivor Series on November 22, Ambrose and Reigns won their respective matches to advance to the finals, where Reigns defeated Ambrose in the main event to win the vacant title, only to lose it almost immediately after the match to Sheamus, who cashed in his Money in the Bank contract. At Fastlane on February 21, Ambrose and Reigns wrestled in a triple threat match also involving Brock Lesnar for the right to face Triple H at WrestleMania 32 for the WWE World Heavyweight Championship, which Ambrose lost after Reigns pinned him.

After Reigns successfully defended the WWE World Heavyweight Championship against AJ Styles at Extreme Rules on May 22, Rollins returned from injury and attacked Reigns to immediately set his sights on the title he never lost. All three members of The Shield briefly reunited on the June 13 episode of Raw, when Ambrose hosted his Ambrose Asylum segment with Rollins and Reigns as guests in a lead up to their respective matches at Money in the Bank: Ambrose in the Money in the Bank ladder match, Reigns and Rollins in the main event for the championship. At the event on June 19, Ambrose won the Money in the Bank ladder match, and Rollins regained the WWE World Heavyweight Championship from Reigns in the main event, only to lose the title to Ambrose immediately afterwards when he successfully cashed in his Money in the Bank contract. All three members of The Shield competed in a triple threat match for the renamed WWE Championship at Battleground on July 24, where Ambrose was victorious after pinning Reigns.

The Shield members briefly reunited once again at Survivor Series on November 20 during its traditional 5-on-5 Survivor Series elimination match, with Rollins and Reigns on Team Raw and Ambrose on Team SmackDown, when all three members executed their signature triple powerbomb on Ambrose's rival AJ Styles after Ambrose turned on his team to attack Styles. In December 2016, they appeared together at Tribute to the Troops during a backstage segment with The Club and The New Day.

== Professional wrestling persona ==
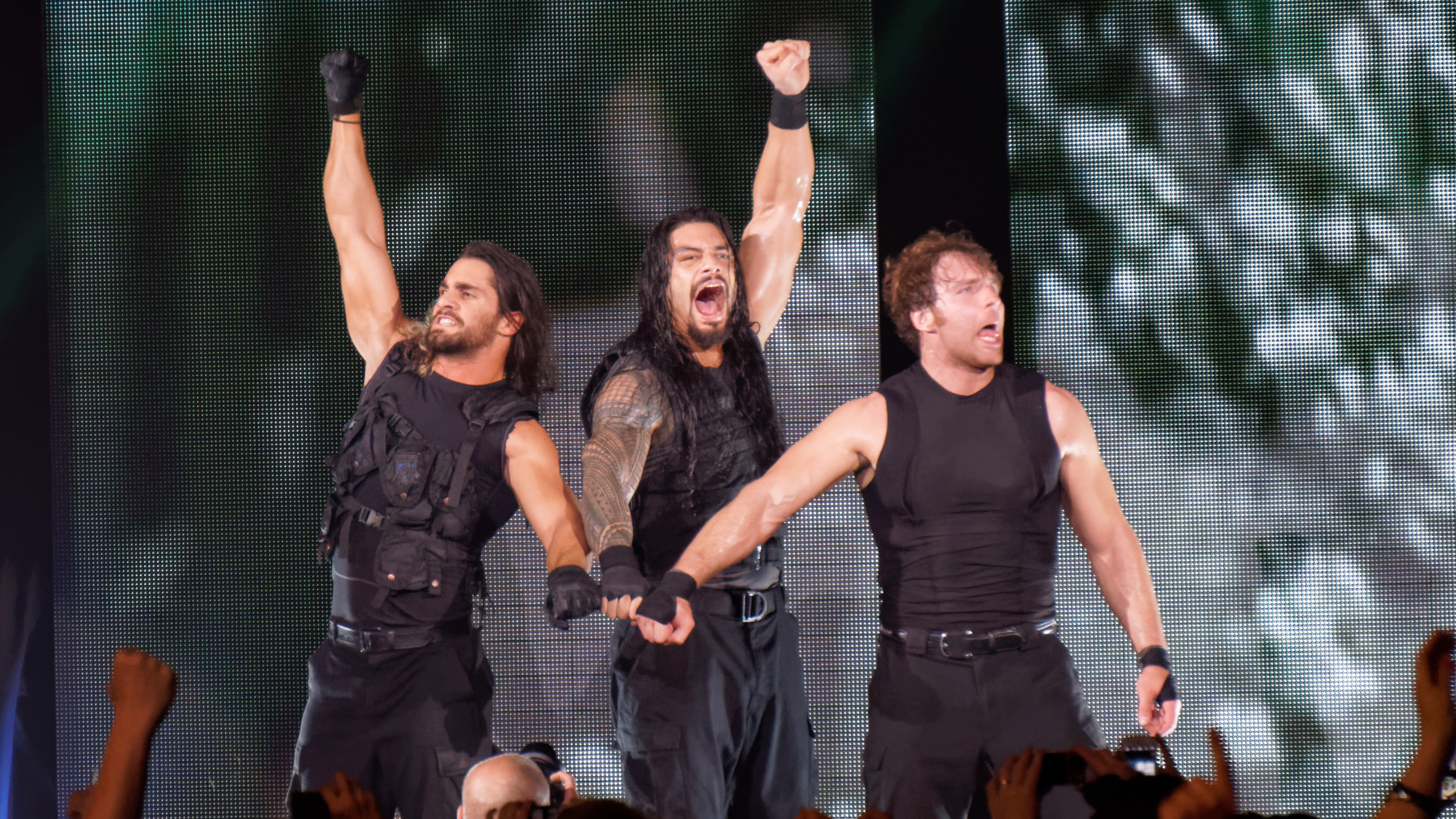
The Shield performing their signature pose in May 2014

The Shield has from the beginning of their existence voiced their intentions to fight what they perceived as "injustice". They were also known for their black ring attire (including protective vests) with each member having their own style, their tendency to approach the ring through the live audience and their trademark promos, which were recorded from a first-person perspective using a handheld camcorder. They were a group which possessed teamwork and a willingness to sacrifice themselves as an individual for the good of the team, which achieved victories by overwhelming opponents with superior numbers after incapacitating their teammates. The Shield referred to WWE as their "yard" during their speeches and were nicknamed as "The Hounds of Justice".

For their individual characters:

- Dean Ambrose – played the "de facto leader" and "mouthpiece" of the group. Ambrose's role was described as being "the more vocal leader of the group" and was then tweaked to become more verbally arrogant in mid-2013. WWE also described Ambrose's character as "slightly off" and "wild".
- Roman Reigns – was established by WWE as the "powerhouse" and "heavy hitter" of The Shield, as well as an "exceptional athlete". Reigns was noted as the least talkative of The Shield members. In mid-2013, Reigns' character was described as being tweaked to become extremely confident and a source of leadership with "quiet strength".
- Seth Rollins – was described as having a "chaotic" in-ring style. In mid-2013, he was described as "the out-spoken, hot-head who will do crazy things" to help The Shield. In 2014, Rollins gained the labels of "The Aerialist" and "The Architect" of The Shield. While out of character, Rollins explained "The Architect" moniker as that he had a "cerebral approach" in coming "up with the blueprints" for their wrestling matches or storylines.

The group were originally supposed to wear turtlenecks and carry riot shields, but changed their attire before their debut. CM Punk later said he come up with the idea of The Shield, which he proposed were to be his storyline protectors and consisting of Ambrose, Rollins and Kassius Ohno—Punk described "their guy", Reigns, replacing Ohno, who had been rejected by Triple H. WWE Spanish announcer Marcelo Rodríguez named the group for Ambrose, Reigns and Rollins "The Shield" on November 19, 2012, one day after the Survivor Series event.

== Championships and accomplishments ==
- Pro Wrestling Illustrated
  - Tag Team of the Year (2013) – Reigns and Rollins
- Wrestling Observer Newsletter
  - Most Improved (2013) – Reigns
  - Tag Team of the Year (2013) – Reigns and Rollins
  - Worst Feud of the Year (2013) – as part of The Authority vs. Big Show

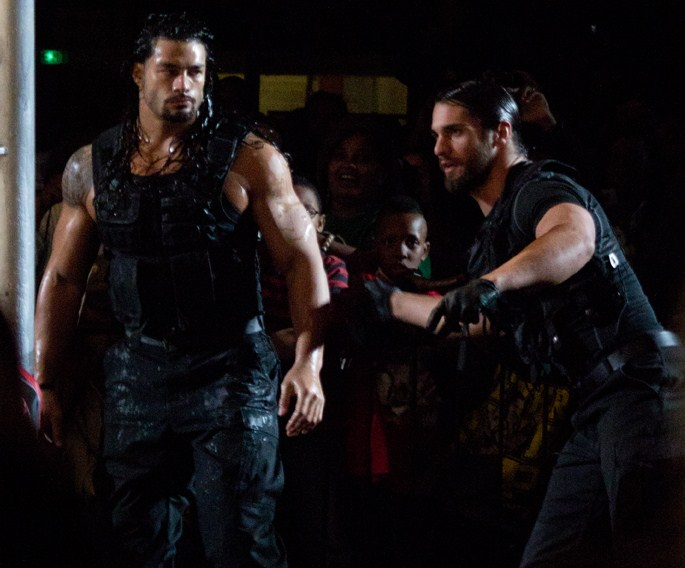
Rollins and Reigns held the WWE Tag Team Championship from May to October 2013.

- WWE
  - NXT Championship (1 time) – Rollins (Note: Rollins won the NXT Championship before the Shield formed, but continued to defend the title as a member of the group.)
  - WWE Intercontinental Championship (2 times) – Reigns (1), Rollins (1)
  - WWE Raw Tag Team Championship (Note: When Reigns and Rollins held the championship, it was called the WWE Tag Team Championship. After the 2016 WWE draft in which the title became exclusive to the Raw brand, it was renamed the Raw Tag Team Championship.) (3 times) – Reigns and Rollins (1), Ambrose and Rollins (2) (Note: Ambrose and Rollins won the Raw Tag Team Championship before The Shield fully reunited and as such they are not recognized as The Shield in the official title history.)
  - WWE United States Championship (1 time) – Ambrose
  - WWE Universal Championship (2 times) – Reigns (1), Rollins (1)
  - Slammy Award (5 times)
    - Breakout Star of the Year (2013)
    - Faction of the Year (2013, 2014)
    - Trending Now (Hashtag) of the Year (2013) – #BelieveInTheShield
    - "What a Maneuver" of the Year (2013) – Reigns' spear
  - WWE Year-End Award for Best Reunion (2018)

== Media ==
- The Destruction of the Shield (February 17, 2015, DVD)
- The Shield: Justice for All (July 10, 2018, DVD)

== See also ==
- Persona and reception of Roman Reigns
