= Laissez les bons temps rouler =

Louisiana French expression

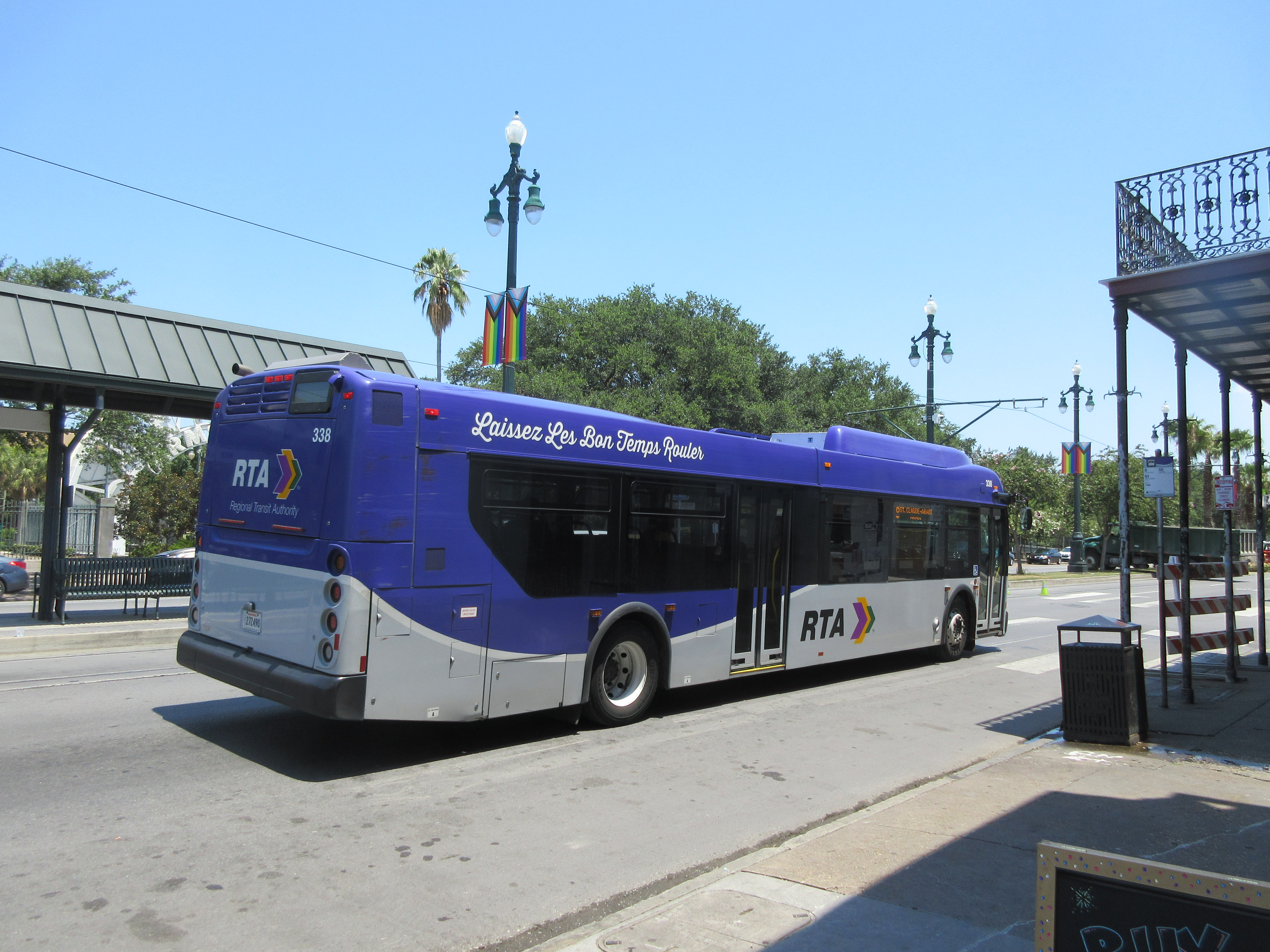
"Laissez les bon [sic] temps rouler" inscription on a New Orleans Regional Transit Authority bus

The expression Laissez les bons temps rouler (alternatively Laissez le bon temps rouler, French pronunciation: [lɛse le bɔ̃ tɑ̃ ʁule]) is a Louisiana French phrase. The phrase is a calque of the English phrase "let the good times roll", that is, a word-for-word translation of the English phrase into Louisiana French.

This phrase is often mentioned in Louisiana (especially New Orleans) and around the Gulf Coast where Mardi Gras is celebrated. It is well known touristically around the United States from television and radio. New Orleanian historian Shane K. Bernard describes the phrase as a "touristy cliché" rather than an authentic Cajun expression. Critical theorist Charles J. Stivale writes that the "evocation of painful memory in Cajun music...while also expressing joy in the present and hope for the future...are summed up wonderfully...by the expression...".

Amateur historian Warren Perrin believes that the phrase traces its origin to Louis Jordan's 1946 recording of "Let the Good Times Roll" by Sam Theard and Fleecie Moore.

== See also ==
- Joie de vivre, a phrase with a similar sentiment
- Mardi Gras
