= Backlash (2024) =

WWE premium live event

- Promotional poster featuring Cody Rhodes
- Promotion: WWE
- Brand(s): Raw; SmackDown
- Date: May 4, 2024
- City: Décines-Charpieu, Metropolis of Lyon, France
- Venue: LDLC Arena
- Attendance: 11,682
- Tagline: "Nightmares Do Come True"

WWE event chronology
← Previous; WrestleMania XL	Next → King and Queen of the Ring

Backlash chronology
← Previous; 2023	Next → 2025

WWE in Europe chronology
← Previous; Money in the Bank	Next → Clash at the Castle

The 2024 Backlash, also promoted as Backlash France, was a professional wrestling premium live event (PLE) produced by the American company WWE, held for wrestlers from the promotion's main roster brands, Raw and SmackDown. It was the 19th Backlash and took place on Saturday, May 4, 2024, at the LDLC Arena in Décines-Charpieu in the Metropolis of Lyon, France, airing live at 7:00 p.m. Central European Time (1:00 p.m. Eastern Time). This was WWE's first PLE to be held in France, and the first Backlash held outside of North America. The concept of the event was based around the backlash from WrestleMania XL.

Five matches were contested at the event. In the main event, Cody Rhodes defeated AJ Styles to retain SmackDown's Undisputed WWE Championship. The referee for the match was Jessika Carr, who became the first woman to referee a WWE world title main event. In other prominent matches, Damian Priest defeated Jey Uso to retain Raw's World Heavyweight Championship and Bayley defeated Naomi and Tiffany Stratton in a triple threat match to retain SmackDown's WWE Women's Championship. The event was also notable for the WWE in-ring debut of Tama Tonga, as well as the return of his adopted brother (biological cousin), Tonga Loa, who previously performed in WWE as Camacho from 2009 to 2014.

The event received highly positive reviews, with the main event and the Street Fight being deemed highlights of the night, as well as the strong crowd reactions similar to Backlash from the previous year. WWE reported that the event set the record for the largest arena gate in company history. This was also the first Backlash to livestream on Abema in Japan and the final Backlash to air on Disney+ Hotstar in Indonesia, Binge in Australia, and the standalone WWE Network in most other international markets, as WWE's content in those areas moved to Netflix in January 2025, as well as the last on SonyLIV in India, which moved to Netflix in April 2025.

== Production ==
=== Background ===
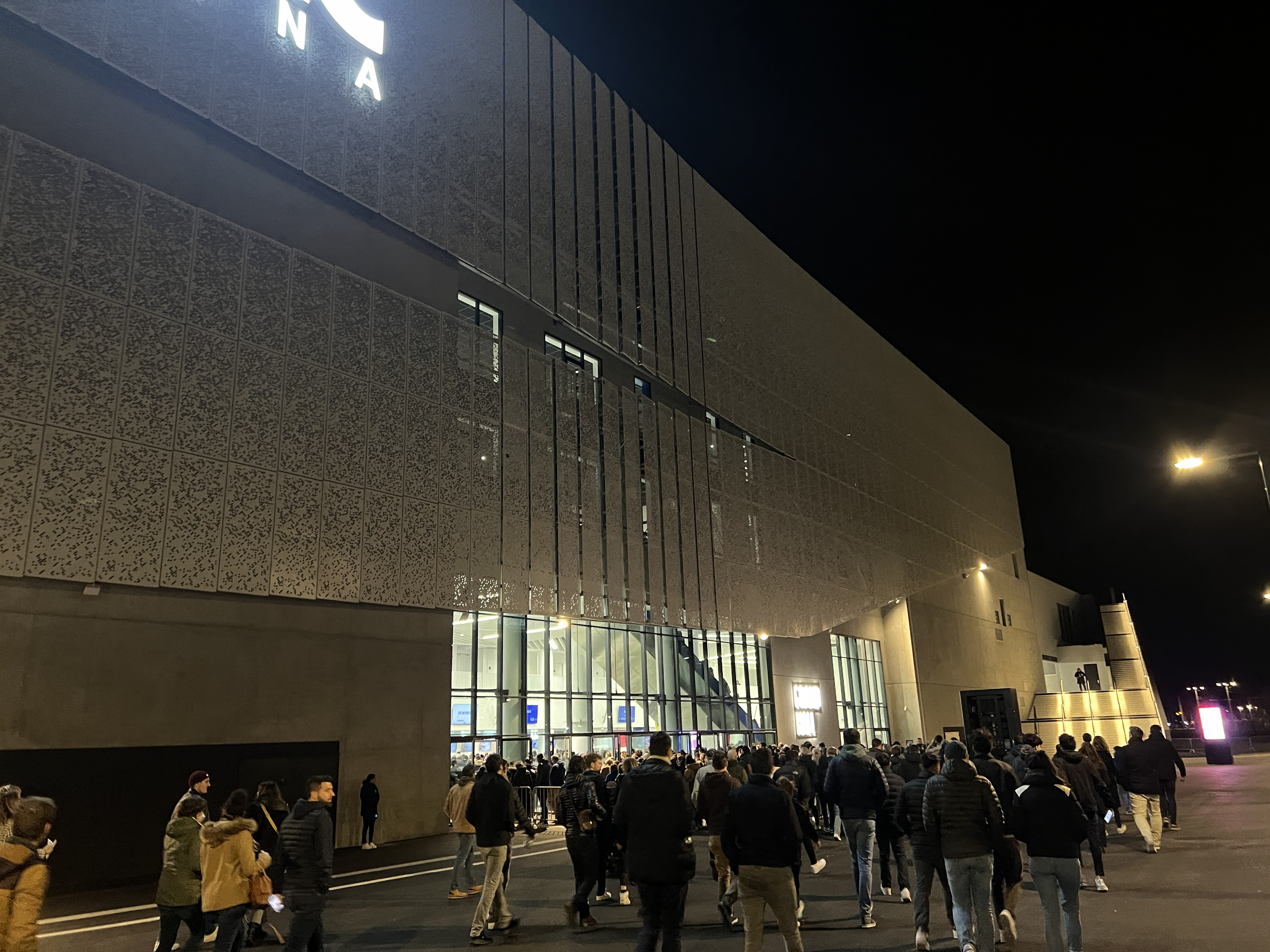
The 19th Backlash was held at the LDLC Arena in Décines-Charpieu in the Metropolis of Lyon, France, which was WWE's first premium live event to be held in France and the first Backlash held outside of North America.

Backlash is a professional wrestling premium live event (PLE) that was established by the American company WWE in 1999. It was held annually from 1999 to 2009, but was then discontinued until it was reinstated in 2016, although an event was not held in 2019. The event was originally broadcast exclusively via pay-per-view (PPV) before it began simulcasting on WWE's livestreaming platforms in 2016. The original concept of the event was based around the backlash from WWE's flagship event, WrestleMania. The events between 2016 and 2020 did not carry this theme; however, the 2021 edition returned the event to this original concept.

In late October 2023, reports emerged that WWE were discussing plans to hold the 2024 Backlash in Paris, France. The following month on November 16, the company announced that the 19th Backlash would be held in France, but in Décines-Charpieu, in the Lyon Metropolis, on Saturday, May 4, 2024, at the newly constructed LDLC Arena, which opened that same month. This subsequently marked WWE's first PLE to be held in the country, with the event in turn promoted as Backlash France, as well as the first Backlash held outside of North America. This is not to be confused with the first ever WWE event held in France, which occurred on October 23, 1987 (then as World Wrestling Federation; WWF). The event was based around the backlash of WrestleMania XL and featured wrestlers from the Raw and SmackDown brand divisions. Additionally, the May 3 episode of Friday Night SmackDown was held at the same arena, marking the first time that the program was broadcast from France. Tickets went on sale on January 12, 2024.

Professional wrestling in France dates back to the 1830s and exhibitions of Greco Roman wrestling in circuses. In the 1930s, French wrestling moved from Greco Roman to Catch wrestling. Between the early 1950s and late 1980s, France was one of two European countries, along with the United Kingdom, to have regular national television coverage of professional wrestling. As with British wrestling on ITV, French TV likewise made household names of wrestling stars. Some French wrestlers, notably André the Giant and Edouard Carpentier, went on to have successful American wrestling careers. By the mid-1980s, the World Wrestling Federation (WWF, renamed WWE in 2002) had invaded France and soon eclipsed local wrestling in popular culture.

=== Broadcast outlets ===
The PLE was broadcast on traditional PPV outlets worldwide. It was also available to livestream on Peacock in the United States, SonyLIV in India, Disney+ Hotstar in Indonesia, Disney+ in the Philippines, Binge in Australia, Abema in Japan, and the WWE Network everywhere else. This was the first Backlash to livestream on Abema after the Japanese version of the WWE Network merged under Abema in October 2023. With the event being held in France, it aired live at 7:00 p.m. Central European Time (1:00 p.m. Eastern Time).

Following an announcement made on January 23, this was the final Backlash to air on the standalone WWE Network in most international markets where it was still available, as well as Disney+ Hotstar and Binge, as its content moved to Netflix in January 2025; a select few territories maintained the standalone WWE Network until early 2026 due to pre-existing contracts before they also merged under Netflix when those contracts expired.

=== Storylines ===
The event included five matches that resulted from scripted storylines. Results were predetermined by WWE's writers on the Raw and SmackDown brands, while storylines were produced on WWE's weekly television shows, Monday Night Raw and Friday Night SmackDown.

On Night 2 of WrestleMania XL, LA Knight defeated AJ Styles, while later that night in the main event, Cody Rhodes won SmackDown's Undisputed WWE Universal Championship, which was subsequently truncated to Undisputed WWE Championship. On April 12, it was announced that Rhodes's first challenger for the title would be determined by a tournament that would begin on that night's SmackDown. Knight and Styles subsequently won their respective triple threat matches. The following week, Styles defeated Knight to earn a match against Rhodes for the Undisputed WWE Championship at Backlash.

On Night 2 of WrestleMania XL, Damian Priest cashed in his Money in the Bank contract to win Raw's World Heavyweight Championship. The next night on Raw, Jey Uso won a fatal four-way match to become the number one contender for the title, which was scheduled for Backlash.

On Night 2 of WrestleMania XL, Bayley won SmackDown's WWE Women's Championship. On the following episode of SmackDown, Bayley said she wanted to give new opportunities to the other women on the roster to challenge her for the title. Tiffany Stratton interrupted to accept the opportunity; however, Bayley said that she was talking about giving Naomi a chance. Stratton then insulted Naomi, prompting her to come to the ring. After a discussion between Naomi and Stratton, they faced each other in a match to determine who would challenge Bayley for the championship, which Naomi won. The title match took place on the next episode, but ended in a no-contest after Stratton attacked both Bayley and Naomi. Another match between Naomi and Stratton was then scheduled for the next episode to determine who would challenge Bayley for the championship at Backlash, but ended in another no-contest after interference from Nia Jax, who had been drafted to SmackDown earlier that night. SmackDown General Manager Nick Aldis then announced that Bayley would defend the WWE Women's Championship against both Naomi and Stratton in a triple threat match at Backlash.

On Night 1 of WrestleMania XL, Bianca Belair and Jade Cargill's team defeated Damage CTRL (Dakota Kai, Asuka, and Kairi Sane) in a six-woman tag team match by way of Cargill pinning Sane. On the April 26 episode of SmackDown, it was announced that The Kabuki Warriors (Asuka and Sane) would defend the WWE Women's Tag Team Championship against Belair and Cargill at Backlash.

Following his loss on Night 2 of WrestleMania XL, The Bloodline's leader Roman Reigns went on hiatus. Solo Sikoa then began taking charge of the group by removing Jimmy Uso and then introducing the debuting Tama Tonga on the April 12 episode of SmackDown, much to the dismay of the faction's special counsel Paul Heyman. The following week, the duo viciously assaulted Kevin Owens. On the April 26 episode, when The Bloodline again attempted to attack Owens, one of Owens's WrestleMania opponents who also had previous issues with The Bloodline, Randy Orton, made the save. Later that night, it was announced that Orton and Owens would face The Bloodline (Sikoa and Tonga) in a tag team match at Backlash, marking Tonga's WWE in-ring debut.

== Event ==
Other on-screen personnel
Role:	Name:
English commentators	Michael Cole
English commentators	Corey Graves
Spanish commentators	Marcelo Rodriguez
Spanish commentators	Jerry Soto
French commentators	Christophe Agius
French commentators	Phillipe Chéreau
Ring announcer	Samantha Irvin
Referees	Danilo Anfibio
Referees	Jessika Carr
Referees	Dan Engler
Referees	Charles Robinson
Interviewer	Byron Saxton
Pre-show panel	Jackie Redmond
Pre-show panel	CM Punk
Pre-show panel	Big E

=== Preliminary matches ===
The PLE opened with Kevin Owens and Randy Orton facing The Bloodline (Solo Sikoa and Tama Tonga, accompanied by Paul Heyman). The match was originally scheduled as a regular tag team match, but the two teams brawled before the bell rang, prompting SmackDown General Manager Nick Aldis to make the match a Street Fight. In the opening stages, Owens delivered a superkick and a frog splash from the barricade onto Sikoa. Orton delivered two belly-to-belly suplexes to Tama and then performed a DDT to Sikoa on the steel steps. Owens hit Tama with a trash can and then hit Sikoa with a kendo stick. Owens set up a table, placed Tama on it and delivered a frog splash through the table. Owens attempted a Stunner to Sikoa, but Sikoa escaped and delivered a lariat. Sikoa delivered two headbutts and a Samoan Drop to Owens through a table. Tama attempted to hit a chair on Orton but Orton ducked an delivered a snap powerslam. Orton performed a draping DDT and then connected with the RKO on Tama, but Sikoa broke up the pinfall. Sikoa then attempted a Samoan Spike to Orton on the announce table, but Orton countered it into an RKO. Owens then delivered multiple chair shots to Tama and then performed a fisherman buster to Tama onto a pile of seated chairs. As Owens was going for the pin, the returning Tonga Loa pulled the referee out of the ring, marking Loa's first WWE appearance since 2014 when he performed under the ring name Camacho. Loa then hit both Owens and Orton with a steel step, allowing Sikoa to deliver the Spinning Solo to Owens onto a seated chair and then the Samoan Spike for the win.

In the second match, Bayley defended the WWE Women's Championship against Naomi and Tiffany Stratton in a triple threat match. In the opening stages, Bayley attempted a sunset flip, but Stratton countered it into a double foot stomp. Stratton delivered a double handspring elbow to both Bayley and Naomi for a two-count. Stratton delivered a lariat and a cartwheel Alabama Slam to Bayley for a two-count. Naomi then delivered a spear to Stratton on the outside and a blockbuster from the barricade to Bayley. Naomi performed a Heatseeker and a split-legged moonsault on Stratton for a two-count. Naomi delivered a sit-out powerbomb to Stratton for a two-count, followed by Bayley delivering a diving elbow drop to Naomi for a two-count. Stratton delivered a cartwheel Alabama Slam again to both Bayley and Stratton on the announce table and attempted a double Prettiest Moonsault Ever, but Naomi and Bayley ducked and performed a 3D on Stratton. Naomi performed a La Magistral cradle for a two-count; Bayley reversed it into a La Magistral for the win.

After that, Damian Priest defended the World Heavyweight Championship against Jey Uso. In the opening stages, Priest attempted a discus lariat, but Jey dodged and delivered a belly-to-back suplex. Jey then delivered an enzeguiri and a diving crossbody to Priest for a two-count. Jey performed a suicide dive to Priest and brought him back in the ring. The Judgment Day member JD McDonagh then attacked Jey behind the referee's back, allowing Priest to deliver a spear to Jey for a two-count. Priest then told McDonagh that he doesn't need his help, which gave way to Jey delivering two superkicks to McDonagh and Priest and then an Uso Splash to Priest for a two-count. Priest then delivered a Razor's Edge to Jey for a two-count. Priest attempted the South of Heaven chokeslam, but Jey escaped and delivered a spear to Priest for a two-count. Jey attempted another Uso Splash, but Finn Bálor distracted him from performing the move. Jey then superkicked Bálor and attempted another spear to Priest, but Priest impeded it with a lariat and then the South of Heaven chokeslam for another two-count. Jey delivered three superkicks, a leg lariat, a spear and then the Uso Splash again to Priest for a two-count, as McDonagh put Priest's foot on the bottom rope. Jey delivered a suicide dive to McDonagh on the outside and a spear to Bálor. Jey attempted another Uso Splash, but Priest blocked him and delivered an avalanche South of Heaven and pinned him to retain his title. After the match, Bálor and McDonagh attacked Jey, until Priest shoved them both and told them to instead celebrate with him.

In the penultimate match, The Kabuki Warriors (Asuka and Kairi Sane) defended the WWE Women's Tag Team Championship against Bianca Belair and Jade Cargill. In the opening stages, Belair delivered a handspring moonsault to Sane for a two-count. Belair attempted a slingshot Pescado to Sane, but Sane ducked, allowing Asuka deliver a roundhouse kick to Belair and a flying crossbody from Sane for a two-count. Sane and Asuka then performed a Sliding D/Sliding Knee strike combination for a two-count. Asuka delivered a spinning back kick, but Belair responded with a vertical suplex. The Kabuki Warriors performed a Codebreaker/Blockbuster combination on Belair for a two-count. Cargill delivered a double springboard crossbody to Asuka and Sane and then a spinebuster to Sane for a two-count. Belair and Cargill the performed a DDT/release wheelbarrow suplex on Sane for a two-count. The Warriors performed a backbreaker/InSANE elbow combination on Belair, but Cargill broke up the pinfall. Cargill then transitioned from a powerbomb into the Jaded on Sane, followed by a KOD from Belair on Asuka and then Belair pinned Asuka to win the titles. With this win, Cargill captured her first championship in WWE, while Belair become the ninth WWE Women's Triple Crown Champion.

=== Main event ===
In the main event, Cody Rhodes defended the Undisputed WWE Championship against AJ Styles, with Jessika Carr as the referee; Carr became the first female referee to officiate a WWE world championship main event match. In the opening stages, Cody performed a gourdbuster and a back body drop on Styles for a one-count. Styles performed a step-up enzeguiri and an electric chair drop. Styles attempted a Lionsault, but Cody got his knees up. Cody performed a suicide dive on Styles, a snap powerslam and a Disaster Kick for a two-count. Cody attempted the Cody Cutter, but Styles blocked and used a roll-up pin for a two-count. Cody attempted a suplex on the apron, but Styles reversed it into an apron brainbuster. Styles attempted a sliding knee strike, but Cody reversed it and powerbombed him through the French announce table. Styles delivered a clothesline and an Ushigoroshi for a two-count. Cody performed the Bionic Elbow on Styles for a two-count. Styles delivered a gutbuster and a springboard 450° splash on Cody for a two-count. Cody delivered the Cody Cutter for a two-count and attempted the Cross Rhodes, but Styles reversed it and delivered a Pele Kick. Styles attempted the Phenomenal Forearm, but Cody countered it into a superkick. Styles attempted a clothesline, but Cody ducked and delivered a Super Cody Cutter and then the Cross Rhodes for the win.

== Reception ==
Backlash France held the largest gate for any arena show in WWE history, until it was broken at Clash at the Castle in June 2024, which was then broken by Bash in Berlin in August 2024. Backlash France also broke the record for the lowest amount of pay-per-view buys for any WWE event in history, attributed to the availability of the event on WWE's livestreaming platforms. Journalists and wrestlers praised the Lyon crowd for their overwhelming reception throughout the event.

Doc-Chris Mueller of Bleacher Report graded the overall show an A, saying "For the second year in a row, WWE has hosted one of the best crowds of the year by taking Backlash somewhere outside the continental United States. The fans in Lyon helped make this an unforgettable PPV for the Superstars in the ring and everyone watching at home. The energy of a crowd can often impact a show in good and bad ways, but this show saw nothing but positivity and excitement. However, it was the men's and women's WWE Championship matches that gave us the best bell-to-bell action. Bayley, Naomi, Stratton, Styles and Rhodes all deserve praise for their performances on Saturday. As a whole, Backlash was a huge success."

Wrestling journalist Dave Meltzer of the Wrestling Observer Newsletter rated the following matches: the Street Fight 4.75 stars, the WWE Women's Championship match 4.5 stars, the World Heavyweight Championship match 3.5 stars, the Women's Tag Team Championship match 3 stars, and the Undisputed WWE Championship match 5 stars.

== Aftermath ==
On the May 31 episode of SmackDown, AJ Styles seemingly announced his retirement, and called out Undisputed WWE Champion Cody Rhodes for a passing of the torch moment; however, after celebrating, Styles viciously attacked Rhodes. This led to an "I Quit" match between the two for the title at Clash at the Castle.

Following the success of this event, on January 16, 2025, WWE President Nick Khan announced that WWE would be returning to France for another PLE sometime later that year. This was later confirmed as Clash in Paris, scheduled for Sunday, August 31, with the following Raw also scheduled for France.

In addition to the majority of countries moving to Netflix in January 2025, this would also be the final Backlash to air on SonyLIV in India following the expiration of WWE's contract with SonyLIV with India then moving to Netflix on April 1, 2025.

== Results ==
No.	Results	Stipulations	Times
1	The Bloodline (Solo Sikoa and Tama Tonga) (with Paul Heyman) defeated Kevin Owens and Randy Orton by pinfall	Tag team Street Fight (Note: The match was originally scheduled as a regular tag team match. However, as both teams were fighting each other before the match actually began, SmackDown General Manager Nick Aldis came out and changed the match stipulation to a Street Fight.)	19:25
2	Bayley (c) defeated Naomi and Tiffany Stratton by pinfall	Triple threat match for the WWE Women's Championship	13:10
3	Damian Priest (c) defeated Jey Uso by pinfall	Singles match for the World Heavyweight Championship	15:45
4	Bianca Belair and Jade Cargill defeated The Kabuki Warriors (Asuka and Kairi Sane) (c) by pinfall	Tag team match for the WWE Women's Tag Team Championship	17:25
5	Cody Rhodes (c) defeated AJ Styles by pinfall	Singles match for the Undisputed WWE Championship	27:20
(c) / – the champion(s) heading into the match

=== Undisputed WWE Championship Eliminator Tournament ===
Qualifiers; SmackDown; April 12, 2024
Kevin Owens Rey Mysterio	— 9:13
AJ Styles	Pinfall
LA Knight	Pinfall
Bobby Lashley Santos Escobar	— 9:27

Final; SmackDown; April 19, 2024
AJ Styles	Pinfall
LA Knight	10:58
