= WrestleMania Backlash (2022) =

WWE premium live event

- Promotional poster featuring Edge
- Promotion: WWE
- Brand(s): Raw; SmackDown
- Date: May 8, 2022
- City: Providence, Rhode Island
- Venue: Dunkin' Donuts Center
- Attendance: 10,050

WWE event chronology
| ← Previous; WrestleMania 38 | Next → NXT In Your House |

Backlash chronology
| ← Previous; 2021 | Next → 2023 |

The 2022 WrestleMania Backlash was a professional wrestling premium live event (PLE) produced by WWE, held for wrestlers from the promotion's main roster brands, Raw and SmackDown. It was the 17th Backlash and took place on Sunday, May 8, 2022, at the Dunkin' Donuts Center in Providence, Rhode Island. The concept of the event was based around the backlash from WrestleMania 38.

Six matches were contested at the event. In the main event, The Bloodline (Roman Reigns, Jey Uso, and Jimmy Uso) defeated Drew McIntyre and RK-Bro (Randy Orton and Riddle) in a six-man tag team match. In other prominent matches, Ronda Rousey defeated Charlotte Flair in an "I Quit" match to win the SmackDown Women's Championship, Edge defeated AJ Styles by technical submission, and in the opening bout, Cody Rhodes defeated Seth "Freakin" Rollins. This was the first main roster PLE to not feature a WWE Championship or Universal Championship match on the card since Elimination Chamber in March 2020.

This was the third Backlash held at the Dunkin' Donuts Center, after the 1999 event, when it was known as the Providence Civic Center, and the 2009 event. It was also the first Backlash to be branded as a "premium live event", a term the company introduced at the start of the year to refer to its events airing on traditional pay-per-view and via WWE's livestreaming platforms. This was also the first Backlash to livestream on Disney+ Hotstar in Indonesia, following the shutdown of its version of the WWE Network in late January. This would also be the second and final Backlash held under the name "WrestleMania Backlash" after the previous year's event, as the following year, the event reverted to its original name but still maintaining its post-WrestleMania theme.

== Production ==
=== Background ===
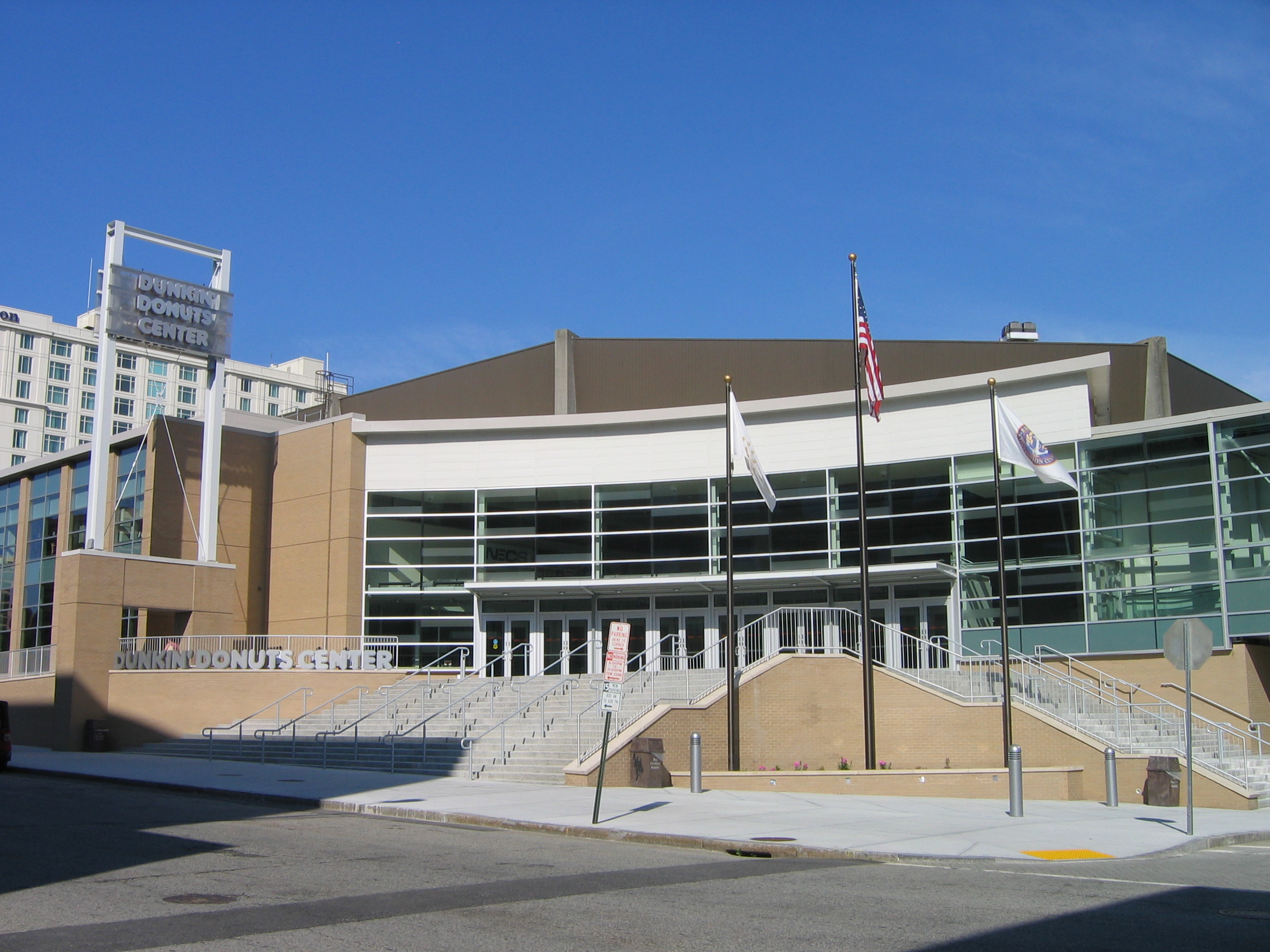
The 17th annual Backlash was the third time for the event to be held at the Dunkin' Donuts Center in Providence, Rhode Island, after the 1999 event, when it was known as the Providence Civic Center, and the 2009 event.

Backlash is a professional wrestling premium live event (PLE) that was established by WWE in 1999. It was held annually from 1999 to 2009, but was then discontinued until it was reinstated in 2016, although an event was not held in 2019. The event was originally broadcast exclusively via pay-per-view (PPV) before it began simulcasting on WWE's livestreaming platforms in 2016. The original concept of the event was based around the backlash from WWE's flagship event, WrestleMania. The events between 2016 and 2020 did not carry this theme; however, the 2021 edition returned to this original concept and the event was in turn rebranded as "WrestleMania Backlash".

On October 25, 2021, WWE revealed its 2022 PLE calendar for the Raw and SmackDown brand divisions with an event slotted for Sunday, May 8, 2022, at the Dunkin' Donuts Center in Providence, Rhode Island. On February 11, 2022, that event was revealed to be the 17th Backlash, marking the third Backlash held at this venue after the 1999 event, when it was known as the Providence Civic Center, and the 2009 event. Like the 2021 event, it was titled "WrestleMania Backlash" and it was based around the backlash from WrestleMania 38. Tickets went on sale on February 18 through Ticketmaster. This was also the first Backlash to be branded as a "premium live event", a term the company introduced on January 1 to refer to its events that are available on PPV and via livestreaming.

=== Broadcast outlets ===
The PLE was broadcast on traditional PPV outlets worldwide. It was also available to livestream on Peacock in the United States, SonyLIV in India, Disney+ Hotstar in Indonesia, and the WWE Network everywhere else. This was the first Backlash to livestream on Disney+ Hotstar in Indonesia, following the shutdown of its version of the WWE Network in late January.

=== Storylines ===
The event included six matches that resulted from scripted storylines. Results were predetermined by WWE's writers on the Raw and SmackDown brands, while storylines were produced on WWE's weekly television shows, Monday Night Raw and Friday Night SmackDown.

At WrestleMania 38, SmackDown's Universal Champion Roman Reigns defeated Raw's WWE Champion Brock Lesnar in a Winner Takes All match to claim both titles, thus becoming recognized as the Undisputed WWE Universal Champion. On the following episode of SmackDown, Reigns stated that he had nothing left to prove; however, he wanted his cousins The Usos (Jey Uso and Jimmy Uso), who held the SmackDown Tag Team Championship, to replicate his feat by winning the Raw Tag Team Championship and bring more gold to The Bloodline. The Usos appeared on Raw the following week to issue a challenge to Raw Tag Team Champions RK-Bro (Randy Orton and Riddle), who accepted and the match was made official as a Winners Take All Championship Unification match at WrestleMania Backlash. However, on the April 29 episode, the contract signing for the match ended with Reigns assisting The Usos in attacking RK-Bro and tearing up the contract in the process. Drew McIntyre then came out and joined forces with RK-Bro in driving off The Bloodline from the ring. Because of what had transpired, Reigns's special counsel Paul Heyman then met with WWE official Adam Pearce backstage where Heyman announced that the resulting tag team championship unification match was called off and instead, a six-man tag team match pitting The Bloodline against RK-Bro and McIntyre was scheduled for WrestleMania Backlash.

At WrestleMania 38, Charlotte Flair defeated Ronda Rousey to retain the SmackDown Women's Championship. During the match, Flair had tapped out to Rousey's armbar; however, the referee was incapacitated and Flair was able to get a cheap win after the referee came to his senses. On the following episode of SmackDown, Rousey, who wanted a rematch with a clear winner, challenged Flair to an "I Quit" match. Flair refused and told Rousey to fall back in line. During Talking Smack the next day, however, the championship rematch was subsequently granted and scheduled for WrestleMania Backlash.

At WrestleMania 38, former All Elite Wrestling wrestler and Executive Vice President Cody Rhodes made his return to WWE after six years as Seth "Freakin" Rollins's surprise opponent, where Rhodes was victorious. On the April 11 episode of Raw, Rollins claimed that he was at an unfair disadvantage since he did not know who he was facing beforehand. Rollins further claimed that on an even playing field, he would defeat Rhodes and challenged him to a rematch, which Rhodes accepted and thus was scheduled for WrestleMania Backlash.

At WrestleMania 38, Edge defeated AJ Styles thanks to a distraction from Damian Priest. Edge and Priest then formed an alliance where Edge claimed to wipe out anyone who did not fit in their "Mountain of Omnipotence". On the April 18 episode of Raw, Edge stated that he needed to finish what he started with Styles and then challenged Styles to a rematch at WrestleMania Backlash, with Styles later accepting. On the May 2 episode of Raw, Styles defeated Priest, thus banning Priest from ringside during the match.

During Happy Corbin's match at WrestleMania 38, he was accidentally distracted by his tag partner, Madcap Moss, which resulted in a loss for Corbin. Following this, dissension arose between Corbin and Moss, with Corbin blaming Moss for his loss at WrestleMania. Tension continued to grow between the two and a match between the two was eventually scheduled for WrestleMania Backlash.

At WrestleMania 38, Bobby Lashley defeated Omos; oddly, Lashley's manager MVP did not accompany him for the match. MVP returned the next night on Raw and turned on Lashley. Over the next few weeks, MVP lambasted Lashley for celebrating his WrestleMania moment without him and thus, MVP aligned himself with Omos. Lashley and Omos then competed in an arm wrestling match on the April 25 episode, which ended in Lashley's favor. Omos then attacked Lashley after the contest and later challenged him to a WrestleMania rematch at WrestleMania Backlash, and Lashley accepted.

== Event ==
Other on-screen personnel
| Role: | Name: |
|---|---|
| English commentators | Michael Cole (SmackDown/Main event) |
| English commentators | Pat McAfee (SmackDown/Main event) |
| English commentators | Jimmy Smith (Raw) |
| English commentators | Corey Graves (Raw/Main event) |
| English commentators | Byron Saxton (Raw) |
| Spanish commentators | Marcelo Rodriguez |
| Spanish commentators | Jerry Soto |
| Ring announcers | Mike Rome (Raw) |
| Ring announcers | Samantha Irvin (SmackDown) |
| Referees | Danilo Anfibio |
| Referees | Jason Ayers |
| Referees | Jessika Carr |
| Referees | Dan Engler |
| Referees | Eddie Orengo |
| Referees | Chad Patton |
| Interviewer | Sarah Schreiber |
| Pre-show panel | Kayla Braxton |
| Pre-show panel | Kevin Patrick |
| Pre-show panel | John "Bradshaw" Layfield |
| Pre-show panel | Peter Rosenberg |
| Pre-show panel | Booker T |

=== Preliminary matches ===
The PLE opened with Cody Rhodes facing Seth "Freakin" Rollins. During the match, Rollins attempted a Suicide Dive, but Rhodes avoided it and performed a Cody Cutter on Rollins for a nearfall. Rollins attempted a Phoenix Splash, but Rhodes avoided it. Rollins landed on his feet and Rhodes performed a Superkick on Rollins. Rhodes went up to the top rope and was cut off by Rollins, who superplexed him. Rollins rolled through to go for a Falcon Arrow, but Rhodes countered into a Cross Rhodes. Rhodes pinned Rollins, but Rollins' foot ended up on the bottom rope, thus breaking the pin. Rhodes attempted a Vertebreaker; however, Rollins reversed into a roll-up while attempting to hold Rhodes' tights, but Rhodes reversed into his own roll-up while holding Rollins's tights to win the match.

Next, Bobby Lashley faced Omos (accompanied by MVP). Throughout the match, Lashley managed to apply the Hurt Lock on Omos momentarily, but Omos was able break out of the maneuver. Lashley attempted a vertical suplex on Omos, who ran the ropes and performed a Spinebuster on Lashley. In the climax, Lashley attempted a Spear, but Omos caught him with his knees and sent Lashley to the ring post. While the referee was distracted, MVP struck Lashley in the face with his cane, allowing Omos to perform the Choke Bomb on Lashley to win the match.

The third match was between AJ Styles and Edge, with Damian Priest barred from ringside. At the start of the match, Styles went after Edge aggressively with punches. Styles dropkicked Edge to the floor, and performed an Asai Moonsault on Edge. Back in the ring, as Styles attempted a Phenomenal Forearm, Edge cut him off with a boot to Styles' injured shoulder. A short time later after Edge targeted Styles's injured shoulder, Styles performed a Pele Kick on Edge. Styles ran the ropes, leading to both men hitting a cross body block to each other at the same time. Styles charged at Edge, who performed a Spear for a nearfall. As Styles went up the rope, Damian Priest walked out and stood in the aisle. Priest claimed he was technically only at the aisle and not the ringside. Finn Bálor then ran out and brawled with Priest, taking him out of the arena. In the closing moments, a masked person shoved Styles off the top rope. Edge applied a Crossface on Styles, who passed out, thus winning the match. Post-match, the masked person joined Edge in the ring. The latter dropped to one knee in front of him, with Edge motioning for the person to stand up. The masked person revealed herself to be Rhea Ripley, thus being added to Edge's stable, The Judgment Day. Edge and Ripley held up their arms and celebrated the victory.

After that, Charlotte Flair defended the SmackDown Women's Championship against Ronda Rousey in an "I Quit" match. Early in the match, Flair performed a German Suplex on Rousey. At ringside, Flair pulled a kendo stick underneath the ring. Rousey took the weapon from her and chased Flair, who ran up to the stage and went to the back. Flair returned with two kendo sticks and hit Rousey with the sticks. Flair grabbed a camera and threw it towards Rousey, who then hopped the barricade and fought with Flair in the crowd. Back in the ring, Flair performed the Natural Selection on Rousey onto the chair. Flair applied the Figure Eight Leglock, but Rousey used the chair to break free. Rousey reached up and hooked Flair in an armbar through the chair. Flair declined to quit, causing Rousey to twist the arm of Flair and making Flair say "I Quit", thus Rousey won the SmackDown Women's Championship. It was soon after revealed that Flair had (kayfabe) broken her radial bone in her forearm and would be out of action indefinitely.

In the penultimate match, Happy Corbin faced Madcap Moss. During the match, Corbin performed a senton bomb on Moss for a nearfall. Corbin stuffed a shoulder block by hitting Moss with a knee to the head. Moss performed a fallaway slam on Corbin for a nearfall. In the end, Moss ran the ropes and performed a Sunset Flip to win the match.

=== Main event ===
In the main event, Drew McIntyre and RK-Bro (Randy Orton and Riddle) faced The Bloodline (Roman Reigns, Jey Uso, and Jimmy Uso) (accompanied by Paul Heyman) in a six-man tag team match. During the match, Reigns and McIntyre brawled in the ring. As Reigns knocked Riddle off the apron, McIntyre performed a Claymore Kick on Reigns. Riddle performed a Floating Bro on Jey for a nearfall. Jey performed an Elevated neckbreaker on Riddle, but Orton broke up the pin. At ringside, Reigns leapt off the ring steps and performed a Superman Punch on Orton. McIntyre attempted a Powerbomb on Reigns through the announce table, but Jimmy saved Reigns and took a Glasgow Kiss from McIntyre. Reigns took advantage and performed an Uranage Slam on McIntyre. Back in the ring, Riddle performed an RKO on Jey from the top rope. Reigns had made a quick tag before Riddle performed the RKO, thus after Riddle stood up, Reigns performed a Spear on Riddle to win the match.

== Reception ==
Dave Meltzer rated the first and sixth matches 4.5 stars, the highest of the event. The lowest rated match was the Bobby Lashley vs. Omos match, which was rated 1.25 stars. The AJ Styles vs. Edge match received 3.25 stars, the SmackDown Women's Championship match received 4.25 stars and the Happy Corbin vs. Madcap Moss match received 2.25 stars.

== Aftermath ==
The 2022 Backlash would be the final to carry the name "WrestleMania Backlash", as the following year's event returned the event to its original "Backlash" name but still maintaining its post-WrestleMania theme.

=== Raw ===
On the following episode of Raw, Cody Rhodes was given a United States Championship match against Theory. During the match, Seth "Freakin" Rollins interfered, costing Rhodes the match by disqualification. Rhodes then challenged Rollins to another match, but this time as a Hell in a Cell match at Hell in a Cell, which Rollins accepted.

Also on Raw, Rhea Ripley explained that she joined Judgment Day to become better. She then defeated Liv Morgan. Damian Priest then faced Finn Bálor, which ended in a disqualification win for Bálor after interference from Edge. AJ Styles then attacked Edge, but Judgment Day gained the upper hand. On the May 16 episode, Morgan was at ringside during Styles and Bálor's match, which Styles and Bálor won. The following week, Ripley and Priest defeated Styles and Morgan after interference from Edge. After the match, a brawl between the two teams broke out, with Judgment Day standing tall again. On the May 30 episode, a six-person mixed tag team match pitting Morgan, Styles, and Bálor against The Judgment Day was made official for Hell in a Cell. Also on that same episode, Morgan defeated Ripley, and after the match, Bálor and Styles took out Priest.

MVP hosted a segment of the VIP Lounge, praising Omos for his victory over Bobby Lashley. Lashley interrupted, but was attacked by Cedric Alexander, who wanted to rejoin MVP and reform The Hurt Business. Omos and MVP retreated while Lashley applied the Hurt Lock on Alexander. Later, Lashley said the only reason he did not defeat Omos at WrestleMania Backlash was due to MVP's interference and a rematch between Omos and Lashley was scheduled for the following week as a Steel Cage match, which Lashley won. The following week, Lashley challenged MVP to a match where the winner would choose the stipulation of his match against Omos at Hell in a Cell. MVP defeated Lashley via countout after interference from Omos. Omos and MVP then stated that the match would be a 2-on-1 handicap match pitting Lashley against MVP and Omos.

=== SmackDown ===
Raw Tag Team Champions RK-Bro (Randy Orton and Riddle) appeared on the following SmackDown to challenge the SmackDown Tag Team Champions, The Usos (Jey Uso and Jimmy Uso), to the title unification match that was originally going to happen at WrestleMania Backlash. The Usos accepted and the match was scheduled for the following week, where The Usos won after Roman Reigns prevented Jey from being hit by Riddle's top-rope RKO (while Reigns' special counsel Paul Heyman distracted the referee), followed by Jey performing a top-rope Uso splash, to become the Undisputed WWE Tag Team Champions. Afterwards, The Usos and Reigns continued their attack, ending with Jey performing an Uso Splash on Riddle through the announce table. Reigns and the Usos then held their titles up high as SmackDown went off the air.

After The Usos (Jey Uso and Jimmy Uso) defeated RK-Bro (Randy Orton and Riddle) to become the Undisputed WWE Tag Team Champions, it was reported that Orton had suffered a legitimate back injury and would be out of action for the rest of 2022. On the May 27 episode of SmackDown, Shinsuke Nakamura, whose tag team partner, Rick Boogs, was also out of action due to an injury, joined forces with Riddle and attacked The Usos, who were able to retreat. On the next episode of Raw, Nakamura and Riddle defeated The Usos via disqualification when Jey used a scooter. As a result, Nakamura and Riddle earned themselves a title match. The match took place on the June 3 episode of SmackDown, where The Usos retained after Sami Zayn, who had repeatedly been lobbying for an alliance with The Bloodline over the last few weeks, played Roman Reigns's theme music. Following the match, Riddle brawled with The Usos and Zayn. The following week, Riddle defeated Zayn to earn a match against Reigns for the Undisputed WWE Universal Championship; had Riddle lost, he would have been banished from SmackDown. During the June 13 episode of Raw, Paul Heyman added a stipulation to the match, stating that if Riddle lost, he would not get another title match as long as Reigns was the champion. The match took place on that week's episode of SmackDown, where Reigns retained. Orton then returned at Survivor Series: WarGames in November 2023 and subsequently signed with the SmackDown brand after fending off an attack by The Bloodline (which had since added Solo Sikoa while Jey left the group earlier in the summer) on the December 1 episode of SmackDown, vowing to get revenge.

Madcap Moss was interviewed about his match against Happy Corbin, who then attacked him with a chair, put the chair around Moss' neck, and slammed Moss' André the Giant Memorial Trophy down on top of the chair on him. The next day on Talking Smack, it was reported that Moss suffered a (kayfabe) cervical contusion. On the May 27 episode of SmackDown, it was revealed that Moss would return the following week. There, he lost to Corbin via disqualification after using a steel chair. Later that night, a No Holds Barred match between the two was scheduled for Hell in a Cell.

Charlotte Flair made her first appearance since WrestleMania Backlash on the December 30 episode of SmackDown, where she challenged and defeated Ronda Rousey in an impromptu match to reclaim the SmackDown Women's Championship for a record-setting seventh time.

== Results ==
| No. | Results | Stipulations | Times |
|---|---|---|---|
| 1 | Cody Rhodes defeated Seth "Freakin" Rollins by pinfall | Singles match | 20:45 |
| 2 | Omos (with MVP) defeated Bobby Lashley by pinfall | Singles match | 8:50 |
| 3 | Edge defeated AJ Styles by technical submission | Singles match Damian Priest was barred from ringside. | 16:25 |
| 4 | Ronda Rousey defeated Charlotte Flair (c) by making Flair say "I quit" | "I Quit" match for the WWE SmackDown Women's Championship | 16:35 |
| 5 | Madcap Moss defeated Happy Corbin by pinfall | Singles match | 8:40 |
| 6 | The Bloodline (Roman Reigns, Jey Uso, and Jimmy Uso) (with Paul Heyman) defeated Drew McIntyre and RK-Bro (Randy Orton and Riddle) by pinfall | Six-man tag team match | 22:20 |
(c) / – the champion(s) heading into the match
