= WWE Backlash =

Professional wrestling event series

- WWE Backlash logo used since 2023
- Promotion: WWE
- Brands: Raw (2002–2009, 2018, 2020–present); SmackDown (2002–2003, 2007–2009, 2016–2018, 2020–present); ECW (2007–2009)
- Other name(s): WrestleMania Backlash (2021–2022); Backlash France (2024)
- First event: 1999
- Event gimmick: Backlash of WrestleMania (1999–2009, 2021–present)

WWE Backlash is a professional wrestling event that is produced by the American company WWE, the world's largest professional wrestling promotion. It is broadcast live and has been available through pay-per-view (PPV) since 1999 and via livestreaming since 2016. Since premiering in 1999, 20 events have been held, with its most recent 20th edition occurring at the Enterprise Arena in St. Louis, Missouri on May 10, 2025. With the exception of the events held from 2016 to 2020, the concept of the show is based around the backlash of WWE's flagship event, WrestleMania.

The inaugural Backlash in April 1999 was the company's first monthly PPV held after the discontinuation of the original In Your House shows, which were monthly PPVs held between the promotion's "Big Five" PPVs at the time: Royal Rumble, WrestleMania, King of the Ring, SummerSlam, and Survivor Series. The inaugural event had originally been advertised as an In Your House show, but the branding was dropped before the event took place. From its inception until 2009, Backlash held the position as the post-WrestleMania PPV and was held annually in April, with the exception of the 2005 event, which was held in May. After the 2009 event, Backlash was discontinued and replaced by Extreme Rules in 2010, but after seven years, it was reinstated in 2016 and held in September as that year's post-SummerSlam PPV. The events in 2017 and 2018 were then held in May, but were not the post-WrestleMania PPVs. An event was originally scheduled for June 2019 but was canceled and replaced by a one-off event called Stomping Grounds. Backlash then returned in 2020 and was held that June. The 2021 event moved Backlash back to May as the post-WrestleMania 37 PPV, thus the event returned to its original concept with the 2021 and 2022 events titled as WrestleMania Backlash, but the 2023 event reverted to its original name while maintaining the post-WrestleMania theme. The 2024 event was WWE's first PPV and livestreaming event held in France, as well as the first Backlash held outside of North America.

The 2002 event was WWE's first PPV held following the implementation of the original brand extension the month prior. With the brand split in effect, the events in 2002 and 2003 featured wrestlers from both the Raw and SmackDown brands, but from 2004 to 2006, Backlash was held exclusively for the Raw brand. Following WrestleMania 23 in 2007, brand-exclusive PPVs were discontinued, thus the events from 2007 to 2009 featured wrestlers from Raw, SmackDown, and ECW, the latter of which was established as a third brand in 2006 but was disbanded in 2010. The brand split itself ended in 2011, but was reintroduced in mid-2016. Backlash was then reinstated as a SmackDown-exclusive PPV that year and was WWE's first brand-exclusive PPV of the second brand split, and it was also SmackDown-exclusive in 2017. Following WrestleMania 34 in 2018, brand-exclusive PPVs were again discontinued, thus the events since have featured both the Raw and SmackDown brands.

== History ==
From 1995 to 1999, the American professional wrestling company World Wrestling Federation (WWF, now WWE) ran a series of monthly pay-per-view (PPV) events titled In Your House, which were held between the promotion's five major PPVs at the time: Royal Rumble, WrestleMania, King of the Ring, SummerSlam, and Survivor Series. In April 1999, the WWF phased out the In Your House events to establish permanent names for monthly pay-per-views to be held between these five major events. Backlash was subsequently established to be held after WrestleMania XV, and it took place on April 25, 1999, at the Providence Civic Center in Providence, Rhode Island. Early advertising for the inaugural Backlash had featured the "In Your House" branding until it was quietly dropped in the weeks leading up to the pay-per-view. The concept of the pay-per-view was based around the backlash from WWF's flagship event, WrestleMania.

A second Backlash event was held the following year after WrestleMania 2000, thus establishing Backlash as an annual PPV for the WWF. With the exception of the 2005 event, which was held in May, Backlash was held every April through the 2009 event. Throughout this time, it retained its position as the post-WrestleMania PPV. Following the 2009 event, however, Backlash was discontinued and replaced by Extreme Rules in 2010.

In March 2002, the WWF introduced the brand extension in which the roster was divided between the Raw and SmackDown brands, which is where wrestlers were exclusively assigned to perform. The 2002 Backlash was in turn the promotion's first PPV held following the implementation of the original brand split and it featured wrestlers from both brands. The month after the 2002 event, the WWF was renamed to World Wrestling Entertainment (WWE, which became an orphaned initialism in 2011). While the 2003 event also featured wrestlers from both brands, the 2004 event was held exclusively for the Raw brand and continued to be Raw-exclusive up through the 2006 event. Following WrestleMania 23 in 2007, WWE discontinued brand-exclusive PPVs, thus the events from 2007 to 2009 featured wrestlers from Raw, SmackDown, and ECW, which had been established as a third brand in 2006 but was disbanded in 2010, and the brand extension itself was dissolved in 2011.

After Backlash was discontinued following the 2009 event, it endured a seven-year hiatus. During this time in February 2014, WWE launched their online streaming service, the WWE Network, and in addition to traditional PPV, the events also became available on the Network. In mid-2016, WWE reintroduced the brand split and also brought back brand-exclusive PPVs. Due to the need for more PPV events, Backlash was reinstated, and the 2016 event was held exclusively for the SmackDown-brand and was WWE's first brand-exclusive PPV of the second brand split. Backlash that year was also held in September after SummerSlam, thus ending its previous tradition of being the post-WrestleMania PPV. The 2017 event was moved up to May and was again SmackDown-exclusive. While the event was technically SmackDown's first PPV held after WrestleMania 33, none of the matches were backlash from that WrestleMania. Furthermore, the Raw-exclusive PPV, Payback, was held between WrestleMania 33 and Backlash. The 2018 event was originally scheduled to be a Raw-exclusive PPV, but following WrestleMania 34 that year, WWE again discontinued brand-exclusive PPVs, thus events held since have featured wrestlers from both Raw and SmackDown. Although the 2018 event was held in May, the Greatest Royal Rumble was held between WrestleMania 34 and Backlash.

In 2019, Backlash was originally scheduled to be held in June, however, it was canceled and replaced by a one-off PPV called Stomping Grounds. Backlash then returned in 2020 and was held in June that year. The event was originally scheduled to be held in Kansas City, Missouri, but due to the COVID-19 pandemic, which began affecting the industry in mid-March that year, WWE had to relocate its programming for Raw and SmackDown to the WWE Performance Center in Orlando, Florida with no fans in attendance, although in late May, WWE began using Performance Center trainees to serve as the live audience. The 2020 event was in turn held at the Performance Center and was WWE's first PPV event to be announced after the start of the pandemic.

In August 2020, WWE relocated Raw and SmackDown's events to a bio-secure bubble called the WWE ThunderDome, which was first hosted at Orlando's Amway Center. In December, the ThunderDome was relocated to Tropicana Field in St. Petersburg, Florida, and then in April 2021, it was relocated to the Yuengling Center in Tampa, Florida. The 2021 Backlash was in turn WWE's first PPV held in the ThunderDome at the Yuengling Center. The event was originally scheduled to be held in June, but was moved up to May. This in turn positioned the 2021 event as the first PPV held after WrestleMania 37, thus the event returned to its original concept and was titled "WrestleMania Backlash". The 2021 event was also the first Backlash to livestream on Peacock's WWE Network channel, following the merger of the American version of the WWE Network under Peacock in March that year.

In July 2021, WWE resumed a live touring schedule. On February 11, 2022, WWE announced that the 2022 event would also be held under the "WrestleMania Backlash" name. On March 8, 2023, however, the 2023 event was announced and reverted the event series to its original name of Backlash while maintaining its post-WrestleMania theme. It was also announced to take place on Saturday, May 6, 2023, at the Coliseo de Puerto Rico José Miguel Agrelot in San Juan, Puerto Rico, marking the first WWE event held in Puerto Rico since New Year's Revolution in 2005, and second event overall.

In 2024, the event was announced to be held on Saturday, May 4, 2024, in the Lyon commune of Décines-Charpieu, at the LDLC Arena marking WWE's first PPV and livestreaming event held in France, with the event in turn promoted as Backlash France, subsequently marking the first Backlash held outside of North America.

== Events ==
Raw-branded event	SmackDown-branded event

#	Event	Date	City	Venue	Main event	Ref.
1	Backlash (1999)	April 25, 1999	Providence, Rhode Island	Providence Civic Center	"Stone Cold" Steve Austin (c) vs. The Rock in a No Holds Barred match for the WWF Championship with Shane McMahon as the special guest referee	
2	Backlash (2000)	April 30, 2000	Washington, D.C.	MCI Center	Triple H (c) vs. The Rock for the WWF Championship with Shane McMahon as the special guest referee	
3	Backlash (2001)	April 29, 2001	Rosemont, Illinois	Allstate Arena	The Two Man Power Trip ("Stone Cold" Steve Austin (WWF) and Triple H (Intercontinental)) vs. The Brothers of Destruction (The Undertaker and Kane) (Tag Team) in a Winners Take All match for the WWF Championship, WWF Intercontinental Championship, and WWF Tag Team Championship	
4	Backlash (2002)	April 21, 2002	Kansas City, Missouri	Kemper Arena	Triple H (c) vs. Hollywood Hulk Hogan for the Undisputed WWF Championship	
5	Backlash (2003)	April 27, 2003	Worcester, Massachusetts	Worcester Centrum	Goldberg vs. The Rock	
6	Backlash (2004)	April 18, 2004	Edmonton, Alberta, Canada	Rexall Place	Chris Benoit (c) vs. Shawn Michaels vs. Triple H in a triple threat match for the World Heavyweight Championship	
7	Backlash (2005)	May 1, 2005	Manchester, New Hampshire	Verizon Wireless Arena	Batista (c) vs. Triple H for the World Heavyweight Championship	
8	Backlash (2006)	April 30, 2006	Lexington, Kentucky	Rupp Arena	John Cena (c) vs. Edge vs. Triple H in a triple threat match for the WWE Championship	
9	Backlash (2007)	April 29, 2007	Atlanta, Georgia	Philips Arena	John Cena (c) vs. Edge vs. Randy Orton vs. Shawn Michaels in a fatal four-way match for the WWE Championship	
10	Backlash (2008)	April 27, 2008	Baltimore, Maryland	1st Mariner Arena	Randy Orton (c) vs. John "Bradshaw" Layfield vs. John Cena vs. Triple H in a Fatal 4-Way Elimination match for the WWE Championship	
11	Backlash (2009)	April 26, 2009	Providence, Rhode Island	Dunkin' Donuts Center	John Cena (c) vs. Edge in a Last Man Standing match for the World Heavyweight Championship	
12	Backlash (2016)	September 11, 2016	Richmond, Virginia	Richmond Coliseum	Dean Ambrose (c) vs. AJ Styles for the WWE World Championship	
13	Backlash (2017)	May 21, 2017	Rosemont, Illinois	Allstate Arena	Randy Orton (c) vs. Jinder Mahal for the WWE Championship	
14	Backlash (2018)	May 6, 2018	Newark, New Jersey	Prudential Center	Roman Reigns vs. Samoa Joe	
15	Backlash (2020)	June 14, 2020	Orlando, Florida	WWE Performance Center	Edge vs. Randy Orton	
16	WrestleMania Backlash (2021)	May 16, 2021	Tampa, Florida	WWE ThunderDome at Yuengling Center	Roman Reigns (c) vs. Cesaro for the WWE Universal Championship	
17	WrestleMania Backlash (2022)	May 8, 2022	Providence, Rhode Island	Dunkin' Donuts Center	Drew McIntyre and RK-Bro (Randy Orton and Riddle) vs. The Bloodline (Roman Reigns, Jey Uso, and Jimmy Uso)	
18	Backlash (2023)	May 6, 2023	San Juan, Puerto Rico	Coliseo de Puerto Rico José Miguel Agrelot	Cody Rhodes vs. Brock Lesnar	
19	Backlash France	May 4, 2024	Décines-Charpieu, Lyon, France	LDLC Arena	Cody Rhodes (c) vs. AJ Styles for the Undisputed WWE Championship	
20	Backlash (2025)	May 10, 2025	St. Louis, Missouri	Enterprise Center	John Cena (c) vs. Randy Orton for the Undisputed WWE Championship	
21	Backlash (2026)	May 9, 2026	Tampa, Florida	Benchmark International Arena	Roman Reigns (c) vs. Jacob Fatu for the World Heavyweight Championship	
(c) – refers to the champion(s) going into the match

== See also ==
- List of WWE pay-per-view and livestreaming supercards
