= Backlash (2023) =

WWE premium live event

- Promotional poster featuring Cody Rhodes and Brock Lesnar
- Promotion: WWE
- Brand(s): Raw; SmackDown
- Date: May 6, 2023
- City: San Juan, Puerto Rico
- Venue: Coliseo de Puerto Rico José Miguel Agrelot
- Attendance: 17,944

WWE event chronology
← Previous; WrestleMania 39	Next → Night of Champions

Backlash chronology
← Previous; 2022	Next → 2024

The 2023 Backlash was a professional wrestling premium live event (PLE) produced by WWE, held for wrestlers from the promotion's main roster brands, Raw and SmackDown. It was the 18th Backlash and took place on Saturday, May 6, 2023, at the Coliseo de Puerto Rico José Miguel Agrelot in San Juan, Puerto Rico. After the previous two years were titled "WrestleMania Backlash", the 2023 event reverted to its original name while still maintaining its post-WrestleMania concept, with the 2023 event based around the backlash from WrestleMania 39.

Puerto Rico native and Grammy Award winning rapper Bad Bunny was featured at the event. He was originally promoted to be the host of Backlash, but it was later announced that Bad Bunny would compete in a San Juan Street Fight against Damian Priest, also of Puerto Rican descent, a match that Bad Bunny won. The match also saw appearances by Puerto Rican wrestlers, Carlito, who made his first WWE appearance since the February 1, 2021, episode of Raw, and Savio Vega, who made his first WWE appearance since the 2020 Survivor Series. This match and the event's final match were promoted as a double main event.

Seven matches were contested at the event, including Bad Bunny's aforementioned Street Fight. In the event's final match, which was the other main event, Cody Rhodes defeated Brock Lesnar. In other prominent matches, Austin Theory defeated Bobby Lashley and Bronson Reed to retain Raw's United States Championship, Rhea Ripley defeated Zelina Vega, who was WWE's only female roster member of Puerto Rican descent, to retain the SmackDown Women's Championship, and in the opening bout, Bianca Belair defeated Iyo Sky to retain the Raw Women's Championship, subsequently becoming the title's longest-reigning champion.

This was WWE's first PLE held in Puerto Rico since New Year's Revolution in January 2005, which was at the same venue when it was known simply as the Coliseo de Puerto Rico, and the second overall in the U.S. territory, and the second Backlash held outside the continental United States following the 2004 event. It was also the first Backlash to livestream on Disney+ in the Philippines and Binge in Australia. The event received positive reviews, with fans and critics lauding the San Juan Street Fight and the Raw Women's Championship match, deeming them highlights of the night, while also praising Rollins vs. Omos, the six-man tag team match, and the main event.

== Production ==
=== Background ===
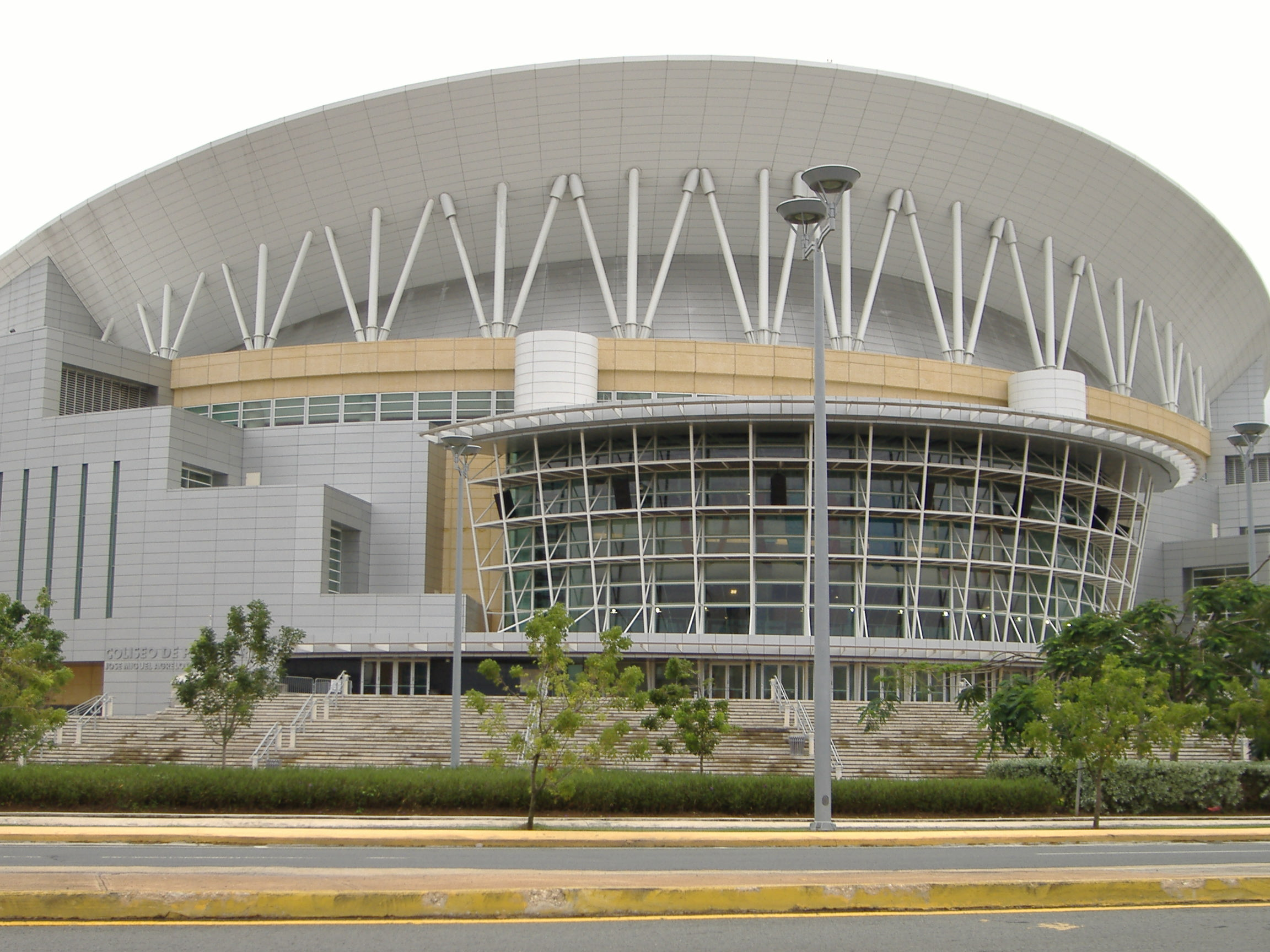
The 18th Backlash was held at Coliseo de Puerto Rico José Miguel Agrelot in San Juan, Puerto Rico, which was WWE's first premium live event to be held in Puerto Rico since New Year's Revolution in January 2005, which was at the same venue.

Backlash is a professional wrestling premium live event (PLE) that was established by WWE in 1999. It was held annually from 1999 to 2009, but was then discontinued until it was reinstated in 2016, although an event was not held in 2019. The event was originally broadcast exclusively via pay-per-view (PPV) before it began simulcasting on WWE's livestreaming platforms in 2016. The original concept of the event was based around the backlash from WWE's flagship event, WrestleMania. The events between 2016 and 2020 did not carry this theme; however, the 2021 edition returned to this original concept and the event was in turn rebranded as "WrestleMania Backlash".

Announced on March 8, 2023, the 18th Backlash was scheduled to take place on Saturday, May 6, 2023, at the Coliseo de Puerto Rico José Miguel Agrelot in San Juan, Puerto Rico and featured wrestlers from the Raw and SmackDown brand divisions. This marked WWE's first PLE to be held in Puerto Rico since New Year's Revolution in January 2005, which was also at the same venue when it was simply known as Coliseo de Puerto Rico, and the second event overall to be held in the U.S. territory. It was also the second Backlash held outside the continental United States following the 2004 event in Canada. While the previous two years were titled "WrestleMania Backlash", the announcement confirmed that the 2023 event had reverted to its original name of "Backlash" but still maintaining its post-WrestleMania theme, with the 2023 event based around the backlash from WrestleMania 39. It was also announced that the May 5 episode of Friday Night SmackDown would air live from the same venue. Tickets for both events went on sale on March 21.

It was initially announced that Grammy Award winning Puerto Rican rapper Bad Bunny would serve as the host of Backlash. He had previously performed his song, "Booker T", at the 2021 Royal Rumble, wrestled in a couple of matches, and also won the now-defunct WWE 24/7 Championship. However, it was later revealed that Bad Bunny would instead wrestle in a featured match at the event. Bad Bunny also hosted the Backlash press conference that was held on Friday, May 5 at 12:00 p.m. Eastern Time.

=== Broadcast outlets ===
The PLE was available through traditional PPV outlets worldwide. It was also available to livestream on Peacock in the United States, SonyLIV in India, Disney+ Hotstar in Indonesia, Disney+ in the Philippines, Binge in Australia, and the WWE Network everywhere else. It was the first Backlash to livestream on Disney+ in the Philippines, following the shutdown of its version of the WWE Network in November 2022, and it was also the first Backlash to livestream on Binge in Australia after the Australian version of the WWE Network merged under Foxtel's channel Binge in January.

=== Storylines ===
The event included matches that resulted from scripted storylines. Results were predetermined by WWE's writers on the Raw and SmackDown brands, while storylines were produced on WWE's weekly television shows, Monday Night Raw and Friday Night SmackDown.

On Night 1 of WrestleMania 39, Kevin Owens and Sami Zayn defeated The Usos (Jey Uso and Jimmy Uso) to win the Undisputed WWE Tag Team Championship. On the following episode of SmackDown, Kevin Owens was attacked backstage by Solo Sikoa, and later that night, Jey defeated Sami Zayn after interference from Sikoa. Afterwards, Jey and Sikoa attacked Zayn further until Matt Riddle made the save—Riddle was injured by Sikoa back in December (kayfabe) and had returned on that week's Raw. The following week, Owens and Zayn's promo was interrupted by The Usos and Sikoa, after which, a brawl ensued and Riddle came out to assist Owens and Zayn. On April 17, a six-man tag team match pitting The Bloodline (The Usos and Sikoa) against Riddle, Zayn, and Owens was scheduled for Backlash.

In the main event of Night 2 of WrestleMania 39, Roman Reigns defeated Cody Rhodes to retain the Undisputed WWE Universal Championship after interference from Paul Heyman and Solo Sikoa. On the following Raw, Rhodes challenged Reigns to a rematch, however, Reigns declined. Rhodes then challenged Reigns and Sikoa to a tag team match, which Reigns accepted on two conditions: Rhodes's partner was someone who competed at WrestleMania 39, and that person could not challenge Reigns for his titles as long as Reigns was champion. Brock Lesnar answered, with the latter stipulation not applying to him due to the stipulation of his match with Reigns at the 2022 SummerSlam. However, the match never occurred due to Lesnar viciously assaulting Rhodes before the match could begin. It was later reported that Lesnar was irate due to his position on the WrestleMania card, as his match had opened Night 2 instead of the main event slot. Rhodes addressed the attack on the following Raw and challenged Lesnar to a match at Backlash. The following week, Rhodes appeared ready to fight, however, Rhodes was deemed unable to compete by medical personnel. To keep Rhodes from fighting Lesnar that night, WWE official Adam Pearce made the match for Backlash official.

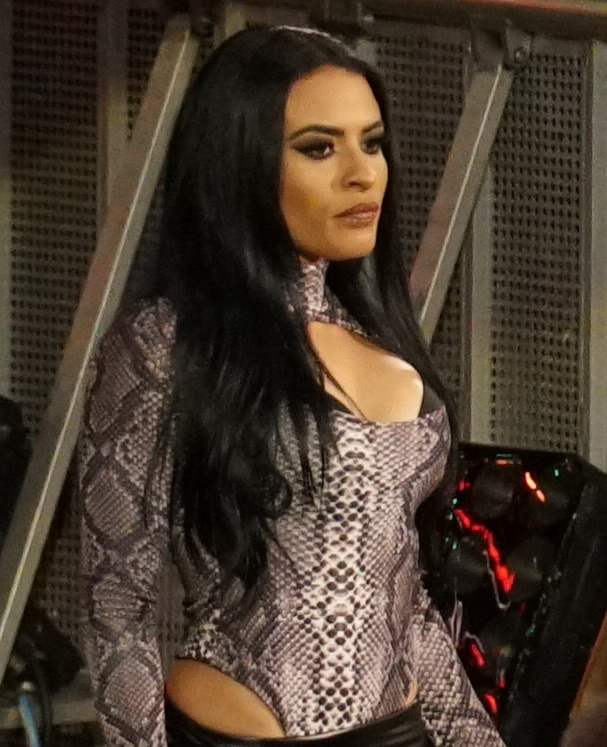
Zelina Vega, who was WWE's only female roster member of Puerto Rican descent, challenged for the SmackDown Women's Championship at the event.

In mid-March, Legado Del Fantasma (Santos Escobar, Cruz Del Toro, Joaquin Wilde, and Zelina Vega) began assisting Rey Mysterio in his rivalry with The Judgment Day (Finn Bálor, Damian Priest, Dominik Mysterio, and Rhea Ripley). This partnership eventually resulted in Rey reforming the Latino World Order (LWO) with Legado del Fantasma. On the April 14 episode of SmackDown during a match between Escobar and Priest, Ripley attempted to interfere only to be thwarted by Vega. The following week, Vega asked WWE official Adam Pearce for a match against Ripley for the SmackDown Women's Championship at Backlash. Vega made this request not only because of the ongoing rivalry between their respective stables, but also because Vega was the only female roster member of Puerto Rican descent and she wanted to represent that at Backlash due to the event taking place in Puerto Rico. The match was later confirmed.

At WrestleMania SmackDown on March 31, Bobby Lashley won the André the Giant Memorial Battle Royal by last eliminating Bronson Reed. The two faced each other in a match on the April 10 episode of Raw, which ended in a double countout. The following week, Lashley faced United States Champion Austin Theory in a non-title match, which ended in a no contest after Reed interfered. On April 21, it was announced that Theory would defend his title against Lashley and Reed in a triple threat match at Backlash.

On April 21, it was announced that Seth "Freakin" Rollins would be facing Omos at Backlash, despite the two never having any conflict to have a match. Three days later on Raw, Omos's manager MVP explained that he was the one who arranged the match, opining that because Rollins was one of the greatest wrestlers in WWE history, a win over Rollins would be huge for Omos's career. Rollins stated that he was not afraid of Omos and would give him the greatest match of his career.

On the April 10 episode of Raw, Iyo Sky won a triple threat match to become the number one contender for Bianca Belair's Raw Women's Championship. On April 24, the match was confirmed for Backlash.

During Rey Mysterio's match against his son Dominik at WrestleMania 39, Dominik's Judgment Day stablemate Damian Priest attempted to interfere in the match while Bad Bunny, who was a guest commentator and was previously friends with Priest, cost Dominik the match. On the following Raw, Priest attacked Bad Bunny, who was seated in the front row, and put Bad Bunny through an announce table. On the April 24 episode, Bad Bunny returned and announced that although he was originally to be the host of Backlash, he would instead be facing Priest in a San Juan Street Fight at the event.

== Event ==
Other on-screen personnel
Role:	Name:
English commentators	Michael Cole
English commentators	Corey Graves
Spanish commentators	Marcelo Rodriguez
Spanish commentators	Jerry Soto
Ring announcer	Samantha Irvin
Referees	Jason Ayers
Referees	Jessika Carr
Referees	Dan Engler
Referees	Eddie Orengo
Referees	Rod Zapata
Pre-show panel	Jackie Redmond
Pre-show panel	Peter Rosenberg
Pre-show panel	Matt Camp

=== Preliminary matches ===
The PLE opened with Bianca Belair defending the Raw Women's Championship against Iyo Sky. This was a competitive back-and-forth match between Belair and Sky. In the climax, Sky's Damage CTRL teammates, Bayley and Dakota Kai, came out to aid Sky and distract, however, Belair fought them off. Sky grabbed Belair's ponytail, however, Belair lifted Sky up for the Kiss of Death, knocking over Kai, who stood on the ring apron. Sky countered into a pinning combination for a nearfall. Sky attempted a Moonsault, but the referee caught Bayley grabbing Belair's ponytail, causing Belair to avoid the move. Belair then performed the Kiss of Death on Sky to retain the title. With this win, Belair subsequently became the longest-reigning Raw Women's Champion, as well as the longest-reigning WWE women's world champion of the modern era, breaking Becky Lynch's record at 400 days.

In a backstage promo, Bad Bunny was confronted by Rey Mysterio and Savio Vega. Vega gifted Bunny a kendo stick to use in his Street Fight against Damian Priest which would take place later.

Next, Omos (accompanied by MVP) faced Seth "Freakin" Rollins. Before the match began, Omos attacked Rollins with a big boot. After the match officially began, Omos dominated Rollins. Rollins performed a Tornado-DDT and a Frog Splash on Omos who kicked out at one. As Rollins attempted a Stomp on Omos, Omos countered into a Chokeslam on Rollins for a nearfall. Rollins applied the Sleeper Hold on Omos, who countered into a sideslam. Rollins performed a Stomp on Omos and performed a superkick on MVP, who stood on the ring apron. Rollins performed a second Stomp on Omos for a nearfall. In the closing moments, Rollins performed a third Stomp on Omos, this time from the top rope, to win the match.

After that, Austin Theory defended the United States Championship against Bobby Lashley and Bronson Reed in a triple threat match. During the match, Theory countered a Hurt Lock attempt by Lashley into a pinning combination for a nearfall. Reed then performed the Tsunami on Lashley, only for Theory to break up the pin attempt. In the climax, Reed attempted a Moonsault on Lashley, who moved out of the way. Lashley then performed a spear on Reed, however, Theory threw Lashley out of the ring and pinned Reed to retain the title.

In the fourth match, Rhea Ripley defended the SmackDown Women's Championship against Zelina Vega, WWE's only female wrestler of Puerto Rican descent. During the match, Ripley would dominate Vega, until the latter performed a comeback, which would include a 619 and diving meteora onto Ripley for a nearfall. In the end, Ripley performed a kick on Vega and followed up with the Riptide on Vega to retain the title. Following the match, Vega received a standing ovation from the Puerto Rico crowd.

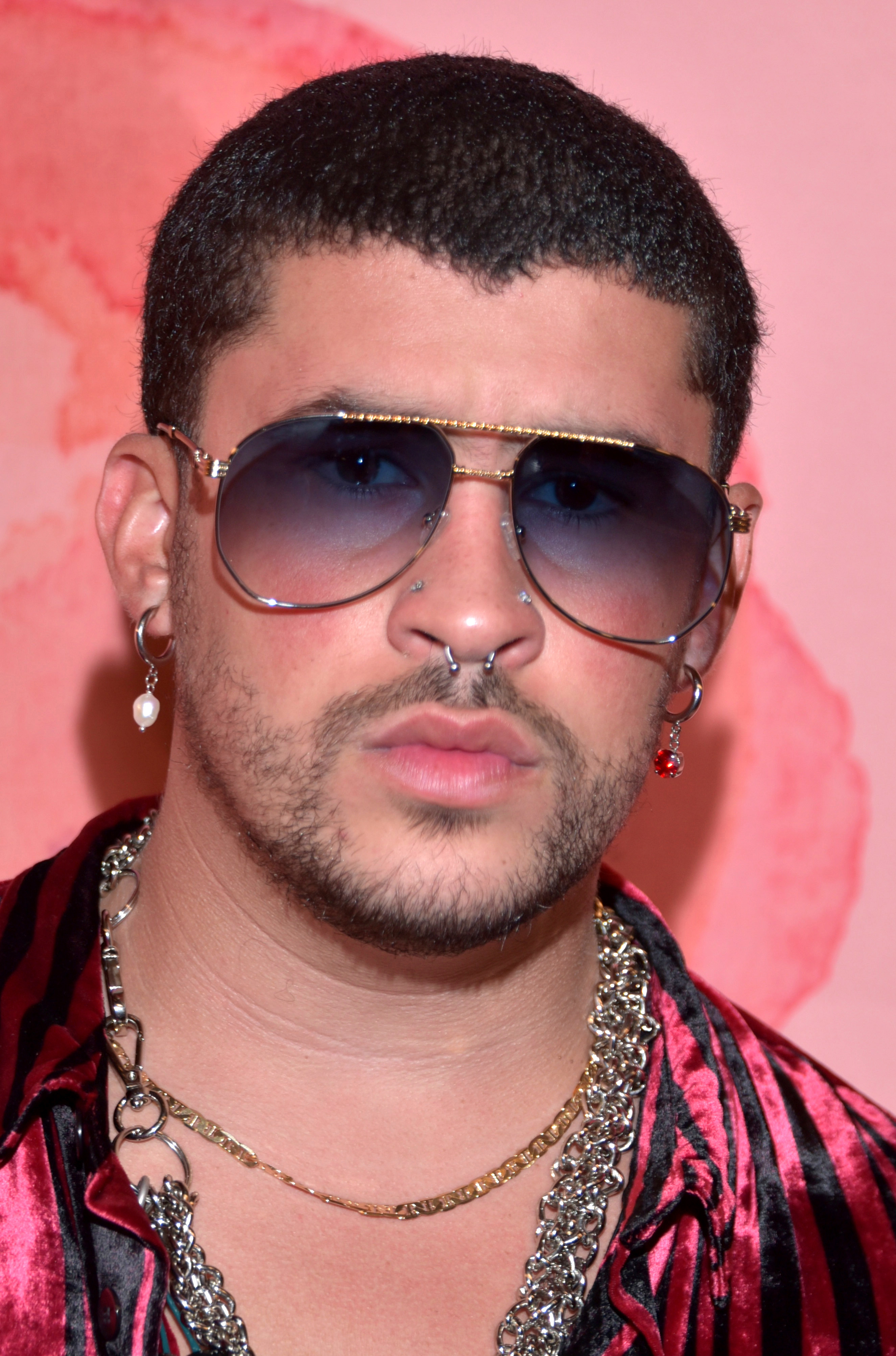
Puerto Rican rapper Bad Bunny defeated Damian Priest in a San Juan Street Fight

Next, Bad Bunny faced Damian Priest in a San Juan Street Fight. Bunny came out to his single "Chambea" and paid homage to Extreme Championship Wrestling wrestler New Jack by pushing a shopping cart full of weapons to the ring. During the match, Priest performed a chokeslam on Bad Bunny, however, during the pin attempt, Priest picked Bad Bunny's shoulders off the mat thus voiding the pin. Bad Bunny and Priest attacked each other with a variety of weapons and Bunny then performed a Michinoku Piledriver on Priest for a nearfall. Priest and Bad Bunny fought in the crowd where Priest performed the Broken Arrow on Bunny from an elevated platform through a table. After Priest carried Bunny to the ringside area, Priest attempted to perform a corkscrew spinning heel kick on Bunny who was leaning against the ring post, however, Bad Bunny evaded, resulting in Priest's leg colliding with the ring post thereby injuring his leg. Bad Bunny attacked Priest's injured leg with kendo sticks, a chain and a chair. Bad Bunny attempted to attack Priest with a chair, however, Priest pleaded with Bad Bunny to not attack him only to strike Priest with a kick. After Bad Bunny attacked Priest with a low blow, Priest's Judgment Day teammates, Dominik Mysterio and Finn Bálor, came out and attacked Bunny. Rey Mysterio then came out to Bad Bunny's aid only to be taken out by The Judgement Day. Former WWE Puerto Rican wrestler Carlito made a surprise return (his first appearance since the February 1, 2021, episode of Raw) and drove Bálor and Dominik out of the ring. Rey performed a 619 on Dominik followed by Carlito performing his signature trademark of spitting an apple on Dominik's face. Dominik and Bálor attempted to escape only for another former Puerto Rican WWE wrestler, Savio Vega, to make his return (his first appearance since the 2020 Survivor Series), followed by the Latino World Order (LWO) (Santos Escobar, Cruz Del Toro, and Joaquin Wilde) and they drove Bálor and Dominik out from ringside. Back in the ring, Bad Bunny applied the Figure Four Leg Lock on Priest and performed Sliced Bread No#2 on Priest for a nearfall. Following this, Bunny struck Priest with a chair multiple times and performed the Bunny Destroyer on Priest to win the match. Following the match, Bad Bunny celebrated by displaying the Puerto Rican flag with the LWO, Carlito, and Vega.

In the penultimate match, The Bloodline (Jey Uso, Jimmy Uso, and Solo Sikoa) faced Kevin Owens, Sami Zayn, and Matt Riddle in a six-man tag-team match. In the climax, Riddle, who was unaware that Sikoa was the legal partner, performed the Bro Derek on Jey but as Riddle attempted a pin on Jey, Sikoa entered the ring and performed the Samoan Spike on Riddle to win the match.

=== Main event ===
In the main event, Cody Rhodes faced Brock Lesnar. During Lesnar's entrance, Rhodes attacked Lesnar at ringside with the mantlepiece of the announce table, the steel steps, and a steel chair. After both entered the ring, the match officially started. Rhodes performed two Disaster Kicks on Lesnar. As Rhodes attempted a third Disaster Kick, Lesnar countered into a German Suplex on Rhodes. Lesnar then dominated Rhodes with several German Suplexes. Rhodes then inadvertently removed the turnbuckle, after which, Lesnar performed another German Suplex. As Lesnar attempted to attack Rhodes, who was pinned on the corner, Rhodes escaped and Lesnar collided with the exposed turnbuckle severely cutting him open. Rhodes performed two Cross Rhodes on Lesnar for a nearfall. As Rhodes attempted a third Cross Rhodes, Lesnar reversed into an F-5 for a nearfall. In the end, as Lesnar applied the Kimura Lock on Rhodes, Rhodes countered by shifting his weight into a leverage pin on Lesnar to win the match.

== Reception ==
The event was WWE's highest-grossing and most-viewed Backlash in company history. The viewership of Backlash saw a 28 percent increase from the record set in 2022. The event received acclaim, with particular praise for the San Juan Street Fight and the Raw Women's Championship bout.

Wrestling journalist Dave Meltzer of the Wrestling Observer Newsletter gave the Raw Women's Championship match 4.25 stars, the United States Championship match 2.5 stars, the Seth "Freakin" Rollins vs. Omos match 3 stars, the SmackDown Women's Championship match 2 stars (the lowest rated match on the card), the six-man tag team match 3.75 stars, the San Juan Street Fight 4.5 stars (the highest rated match on the card), and the main event between Cody Rhodes and Brock Lesnar 3.75 stars.

== Aftermath ==
The 2023 WWE Draft took place on the April 28 and May 1 episodes of SmackDown and Raw, respectively, with draft results taking effect beginning with the Raw after Backlash on May 8. This subsequently ended possible rematches between wrestlers who were drafted to opposite brands. For example, SmackDown Women's Champion Rhea Ripley, as well as the rest of Judgment Day, were drafted to Raw, while Zelina Vega and the LWO were drafted to SmackDown, thus ending the rivalry between the two stables. Additionally, this would be Bronson Reed's last match for the United States Championship, as Reed was drafted to Raw while reigning champion Austin Theory was drafted to SmackDown, thus taking the title with him; Bobby Lashley was also drafted to SmackDown.

=== Raw ===
On the following episode of Raw, Cody Rhodes participated in the World Heavyweight Championship Tournament to crown a new champion at Night of Champions. During the first round triple threat match that Rhodes competed in, Brock Lesnar interfered and attacked Rhodes, costing him an opportunity at the title. Lesnar subsequently challenged Rhodes to another match at Night of Champions, which Rhodes accepted.

=== SmackDown ===
On the following episode of SmackDown, despite Roman Reigns praising Solo Sikoa for winning the match for The Bloodline at Backlash, he expressed his disappointment with The Usos (Jey Uso and Jimmy Uso) due to their inability to regain the Undisputed WWE Tag Team Championship prior to the event. Paul Heyman then revealed that instead of The Usos, Reigns and Sikoa would challenge Kevin Owens and Sami Zayn for the Undisputed WWE Tag Team Championship at Night of Champions.

== Results ==
No.	Results	Stipulations	Times
1	Bianca Belair (c) defeated Iyo Sky by pinfall	Singles match for the WWE Raw Women's Championship	18:00
2	Seth "Freakin" Rollins defeated Omos (with MVP) by pinfall	Singles match	10:30
3	Austin Theory (c) defeated Bobby Lashley and Bronson Reed by pinfall	Triple threat match for the WWE United States Championship	6:50
4	Rhea Ripley (c) defeated Zelina Vega by pinfall	Singles match for the WWE SmackDown Women's Championship	7:10
5	Bad Bunny defeated Damian Priest by pinfall	San Juan Street Fight	25:00
6	The Bloodline (Solo Sikoa, Jey Uso, and Jimmy Uso) defeated Matt Riddle, Kevin Owens, and Sami Zayn by pinfall	Six-man tag team match	22:00
7	Cody Rhodes defeated Brock Lesnar by pinfall	Singles match	9:40
(c) / – the champion(s) heading into the match

== See also ==
- Professional wrestling in Puerto Rico
