= WrestleMania Backlash (2021) =

WWE pay-per-view and livestreaming event

- Promotional poster featuring Bobby Lashley, Bianca Belair, Roman Reigns, and Rhea Ripley
- Promotion: WWE
- Brand(s): Raw; SmackDown
- Date: May 16, 2021
- City: Tampa, Florida
- Venue: WWE ThunderDome at Yuengling Center
- Attendance: 0 (behind closed doors) (Note: The event was held without a paying audience due to the COVID-19 pandemic in the United States, though it featured a live crowd of virtual fans via WWE's ThunderDome viewing experience.)

WWE event chronology
← Previous; WrestleMania 37	Next → NXT TakeOver: In Your House

Backlash chronology
← Previous; 2020	Next → 2022

The 2021 WrestleMania Backlash was a professional wrestling pay-per-view (PPV) and livestreaming event produced by WWE, held for wrestlers from the promotion's main roster brands, Raw and SmackDown. It was the 16th Backlash and due to the COVID-19 pandemic, it took place on May 16, 2021, from the WWE ThunderDome, a bio-secure bubble that at the time was hosted at the Yuengling Center in Tampa, Florida. The concept of the event was based around the backlash from WrestleMania 37, which was the first time that Backlash carried its original post-WrestleMania theme since 2009 and as a result was titled "WrestleMania Backlash".

This was WWE's first PPV and livestreaming event to present the ThunderDome from the Yuengling Center, following a four-month residency at Tropicana Field in St. Petersburg, Florida. It was also the first Backlash to livestream on SonyLIV in India and Peacock in the United States following the shutdown of the Indian version of the WWE Network in February and the American version in April. The 2022 event would also bear the "WrestleMania Backlash" name but it was truncated back to "Backlash" in 2023 while maintaining the post-WrestleMania theme.

Seven matches were contested at the event, including one on the Kickoff pre-show. In the main event, Roman Reigns defeated Cesaro by technical submission to retain SmackDown's Universal Championship. In another prominent match, Bobby Lashley defeated Drew McIntyre and Braun Strowman in a triple threat match to retain Raw's WWE Championship. Also on the undercard, Bianca Belair defeated Bayley to retain the SmackDown Women's Championship and Rey Mysterio and Dominik Mysterio defeated Dolph Ziggler and Robert Roode to win the SmackDown Tag Team Championship, thus becoming the first-ever father and son team to hold a tag team championship in WWE.

The event received mostly positive reviews from critics and fans. It included a promotional tie-in for the 2021 zombie film Army of the Dead, which starred former WWE wrestler Batista. In addition to Batista doing a voiceover for the event's opening vignette, the Lumberjack match between Damian Priest and The Miz had the lumberjacks acting as zombies. This tie-in was heavily panned and covered in the media, with the New York Post calling it "one of WWE's saddest moments ever". Despite the negative criticism towards the tie-in, the rest of the event was well received.

== Production ==
=== Background ===
Backlash is a professional wrestling event that was established by WWE in 1999. It was held annually from 1999 to 2009, but was then discontinued until it was reinstated in 2016, although an event was not held in 2019. The event was originally broadcast exclusively via pay-per-view (PPV) before it began simulcasting on WWE's livestreaming platforms in 2016. The original concept of the event was based around the backlash from WWE's flagship event, WrestleMania, but this theme was dropped with its 2016 revival.

The 16th Backlash was initially scheduled for June 20, 2021, however, during Night 2 of WrestleMania 37, it was revealed that Backlash had switched dates with Money in the Bank and would instead take place on May 16, 2021, featuring wrestlers from the Raw and SmackDown brand divisions. It was also revealed that it would be titled as "WrestleMania Backlash", thus returning the event to its original concept and featuring the backlash from WrestleMania 37.

==== Impact of the COVID-19 pandemic ====
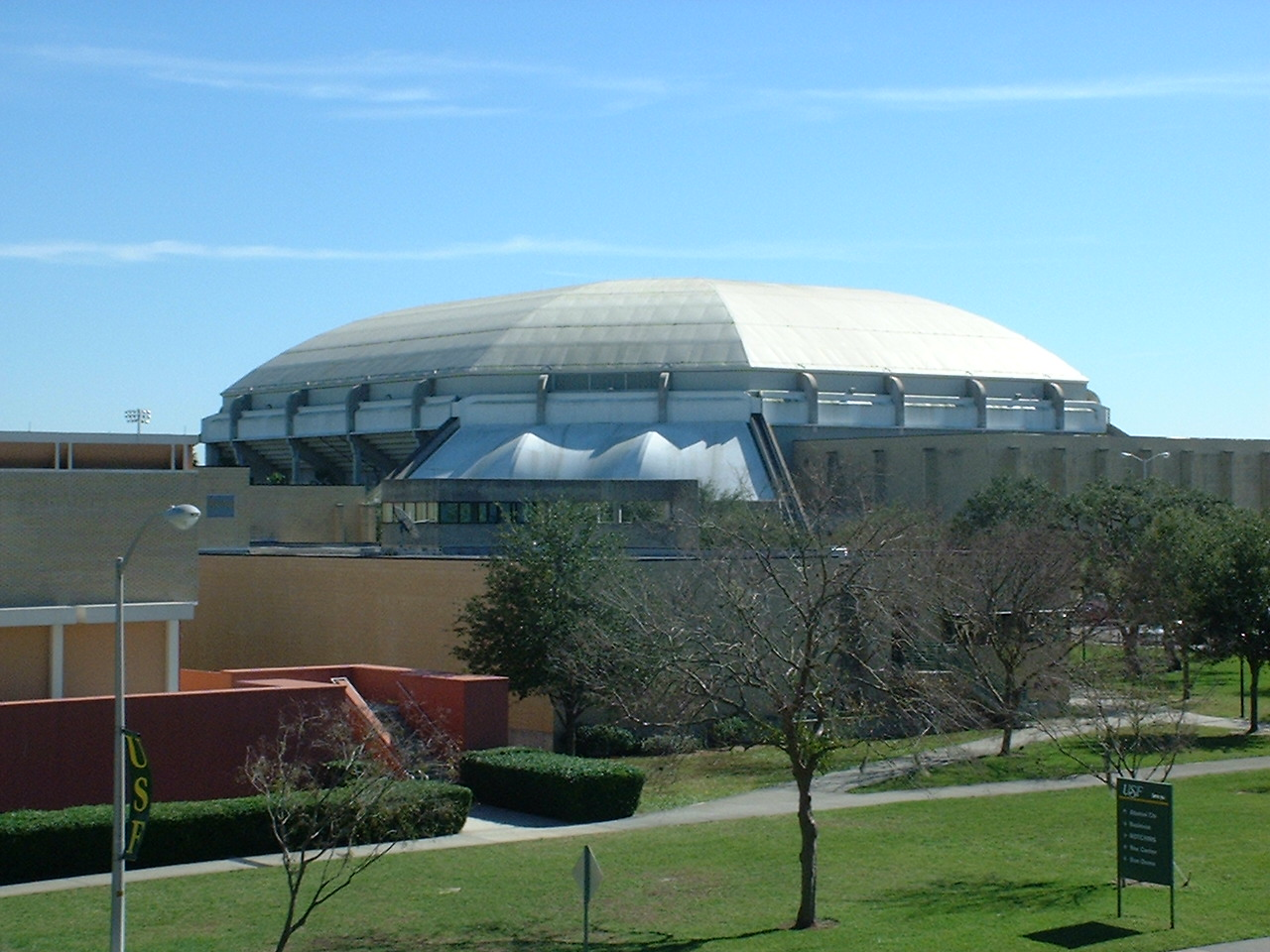
Due to the COVID-19 pandemic, the 16th Backlash was produced by way of a bio-secure bubble called the WWE ThunderDome, which at the time was hosted at the Yuengling Center in Tampa, Florida. This was WWE's first pay-per-view and livestreaming event to be produced from the ThunderDome at the Yuengling Center.

As a result of the COVID-19 pandemic that began affecting the industry in mid-March 2020, WWE had to present the majority of its programming from a behind closed doors set. Initially, Raw and SmackDown's shows were done at the WWE Performance Center in Orlando, Florida. A limited number of Performance Center trainees and friends and family members of the wrestlers were later utilized to serve as the live audience. In late August, these programs were moved to a bio-secure bubble called the WWE ThunderDome. The select live audience was no longer utilized as the bubble allowed fans to attend the events virtually for free and be seen on the nearly 1,000 LED boards within the arena. Additionally, the ThunderDome utilized various special effects to further enhance wrestlers' entrances, and arena audio was mixed with that of the chants from the virtual fans. After being hosted at Orlando's Amway Center, the ThunderDome was relocated to Tropicana Field in St. Petersburg, Florida in December.

Due to the start of the 2021 Tampa Bay Rays season, as Tropicana Field is the home venue of the Tampa Bay Rays, on March 24, 2021, WWE announced that the ThunderDome would be relocated to the Yuengling Center, located on the campus of the University of South Florida in Tampa, which began with the April 12 episode of Raw. Subsequently, WrestleMania Backlash was WWE's first PPV and livestreaming event produced from the ThunderDome at the Yuengling Center.

=== Broadcast outlets ===
The event was broadcast on traditional PPV worldwide. It was also available to livestream on Peacock in the United States, SonyLIV in India, and the WWE Network everywhere else. This was the first Backlash to livestream on SonyLIV and Peacock, following the shutdown of the Indian version of the WWE Network in February and the American version in April.

=== Storylines ===
The event comprised seven matches, including one on the pre-show, that resulted from scripted storylines. Results were predetermined by WWE's writers on the Raw and SmackDown brands, while storylines were produced on WWE's weekly television shows, Monday Night Raw and Friday Night SmackDown.

On the April 16 episode of SmackDown, Universal Champion Roman Reigns, along with Paul Heyman and Jey Uso, boasted about retaining his championship in the main event of Night 2 of WrestleMania 37. Reigns was then interrupted by Cesaro, but before he could speak, Reigns, Jey, and Heyman left the ring and departed backstage. Later, Cesaro confronted WWE officials Adam Pearce and Sonya Deville about facing Reigns that night, even as a non-title match. However, instead of Reigns, Cesaro faced Jey in the main event, which ended by disqualification when Seth Rollins, who Cesaro had defeated at Night 1 of WrestleMania 37, interfered and attacked Cesaro, proclaiming that their rivalry was not over. On the special Throwback SmackDown on May 7, Cesaro was scheduled to face Rollins with the added stipulation that if Cesaro won, he would earn a Universal Championship match at WrestleMania Backlash. Cesaro defeated Rollins once again, securing the championship match. Also that episode, Jey's brother Jimmy Uso returned from injury, last appearing at Hell in a Cell in October 2020, and although conflicted at first, particularly because of what Reigns did to them at Hell in a Cell, Jimmy also eventually aligned with Reigns, but soon turned on Reigns.

At Night 1 of WrestleMania 37, Bobby Lashley defeated Drew McIntyre to retain the WWE Championship. On the following night's Raw, Lashley's manager MVP declared that no one could defeat Lashley. McIntyre interrupted and wanted another opportunity at Lashley, claiming that he would have defeated him if MVP had not distracted him and prevented him from performing the Claymore Kick on Lashley. Braun Strowman and Randy Orton then interrupted and stated their respective cases to challenge for the title. WWE official Adam Pearce then scheduled a triple threat match between McIntyre, Strowman, and Orton with the winner facing Lashley for the WWE Championship at WrestleMania Backlash, which was won by McIntyre. On the April 26 episode, Strowman challenged McIntyre to a match with the added stipulation that if Strowman won, he would be added to the championship match at WrestleMania Backlash. Strowman defeated McIntyre, thus the championship match became a triple threat match.

In the main event of Night 1 of WrestleMania 37, Bianca Belair won the SmackDown Women's Championship. On the following episode of SmackDown, The Street Profits (Angelo Dawkins and Montez Ford, the latter of whom is Belair's real-life husband) threw Belair a championship celebration. Later, Bayley challenged Belair for the title. The following week, the championship match was scheduled for WrestleMania Backlash.

At Night 2 of WrestleMania 37, Rhea Ripley defeated Asuka to win the Raw Women's Championship. The two had a rematch the following night on Raw, however, the match ended in a no-contest after interference from a returning Charlotte Flair, who attacked Asuka. Prior to the match, Flair, who had been off TV for the past month, returned that night after missing her first WrestleMania since WrestleMania 32 in 2016. The following week, Flair lost to Asuka thanks to a distraction from Ripley. Following the match, an irate Flair attacked the referee. Adam Pearce subsequently suspended Flair, however, fellow WWE official Sonya Deville, who primarily appeared on SmackDown, reinstated Flair the following week after Flair made a public apology on Raw. On the May 3 episode, another rematch between Ripley and Asuka for the Raw Women's Championship was scheduled for WrestleMania Backlash. However, Deville allowed Flair a chance to present a proposal and after hearing Flair's case, Deville added Flair to the championship match to make it a triple threat match.

At the special "WrestleMania Edition" of SmackDown on April 9, Dolph Ziggler and Robert Roode and The Mysterios (composed of Rey Mysterio and Dominik Mysterio) took part in a fatal four-way tag team match for Ziggler and Roode's SmackDown Tag Team Championship, where the champions retained. On May 7, a title match between the two teams was scheduled for WrestleMania Backlash.

At Night 1 of WrestleMania 37, Bad Bunny and Damian Priest defeated The Miz and John Morrison. On the following Raw, The Miz hosted a segment of "Miz TV" along with Morrison, which also saw the return of Miz's wife Maryse to WWE programming, who last appeared in December 2019. Miz bragged and claimed that he turned Bad Bunny into a WWE superstar. Priest interrupted and praised Bad Bunny and then challenged Miz and Morrison to a handicap match. Priest lost the match after The Miz pinned him with a roll-up and used the ropes as leverage while Maryse also assisted. Priest then defeated The Miz the following week. On the May 3 episode, Priest defeated Morrison due to an untimely distraction by The Miz. The following week, Priest defeated Morrison to pick the stipulation for his match against The Miz at WrestleMania Backlash, and chose a lumberjack match.

== Event ==
Other on-screen personnel
Role:	Name:
English commentators	Michael Cole (SmackDown)
English commentators	Pat McAfee (SmackDown)
English commentators	Adnan Virk (Raw)
English commentators	Corey Graves (Raw)
English commentators	Byron Saxton (Raw)
Spanish commentators	Carlos Cabrera
Spanish commentators	Marcelo Rodriguez
Ring announcers	Greg Hamilton (SmackDown)
Ring announcers	Mike Rome (Raw)
Referees	Danilo Anfibio
Referees	Shawn Bennett
Referees	Jessika Carr
Referees	Dan Engler
Referees	Darrick Moore
Referees	Eddie Orengo
Referees	Rod Zapata
Interviewer	Kevin Patrick
Pre-show panel	Kayla Braxton
Pre-show panel	John "Bradshaw" Layfield
Pre-show panel	Peter Rosenberg
Pre-show panel	Booker T
Pre-show panel	Sonya Deville

=== Pre-show ===
During the WrestleMania Backlash Kickoff pre-show, United States Champion Sheamus faced Ricochet in a non-title match. In the end, Sheamus performed a Knee Strike on Ricochet to win the match.

=== Preliminary matches ===
The actual event opened with Rhea Ripley defending the Raw Women's Championship against Charlotte Flair and Asuka. In the closing moments, after an evenly competitive match between the three, Ripley performed the Riptide on Asuka to retain the title.

Next, Dolph Ziggler and Robert Roode defended the SmackDown Tag Team Championship against Rey Mysterio and Dominik Mysterio. Earlier in the night, Dominik was attacked by Ziggler and Roode, and medical personnel ruled Dominik unable to compete. During the match, Ziggler and Roode dominated Rey. About mid-way though, Dominik eventually entered the match. In the end, Rey performed a 619 on Roode and tagged in Dominik, who then performed a Frog Splash on Roode to win the titles, thus becoming the first-ever father and son team to hold a tag team championship in WWE.

After that, Damian Priest faced The Miz (accompanied by John Morrison) in a lumberjack match. The ring was surrounded by zombies as a promotional tie-in for the 2021 zombie film Army of the Dead, which starred former WWE wrestler Batista. During the match, Priest and Miz teamed to fend off the zombies. In the end, Morrison was "devoured" by the zombies which distracted Miz. Priest performed Hit the Lights on Miz to win the match. Following the match, several zombies entered the ring and "devoured" Miz.

In the next match, Bianca Belair defended the SmackDown Women's Championship against Bayley. Belair pinned Bayley using her braided hair to gain leverage to retain the title.

In the penultimate match, Bobby Lashley (accompanied by MVP) defended the WWE Championship against Drew McIntyre and Braun Strowman. During the match, Lashley and McIntyre fought their way up the entrance ramp where McIntyre threw Lashley through an LED board. Back in the ring, McIntyre and Strowman continued the match. In the end, as McIntyre performed a Claymore Kick on Strowman, Lashley appeared, threw McIntyre out of the ring and performed a Spear on Strowman to retain the title.

=== Main event ===
In the main event, Roman Reigns (accompanied by Paul Heyman) defended the Universal Championship against Cesaro. Throughout the match, Reigns targeted Cesaro's right arm, thus preventing Cesaro from doing his upper cuts and not being able to fully apply other maneuvers. In the climax, Reigns applied the Guillotine Choke submission on Cesaro, who passed out, thus Reigns retained the title via technical submission. After the match, Cesaro was attacked by Jey Uso. Seth Rollins then came out. After a stare down with Reigns, Rollins viciously attacked Cesaro and smashed his right arm in a steel chair.

== Reception ==
The event received mixed to positive reviews. While most of the pay-per-view was well received, the marketing tie-in with Army of the Dead during the Damian Priest vs. The Miz Lumberjack match was heavily panned. The film's star and former WWE wrestler Batista responded to fan criticism, stating that he did not book "a bunch of fucking zombies", and that fans should be calling out WWE Chairman and chief executive officer Vince McMahon for the decision. A review from Shacknews said that WrestleMania Backlash exceeded "almost every expectation," except for the Lumberjack match. The review said that the match was already bad, but it was made worse by the inclusion of the zombies, with Priest and Miz having to act like they were actually scared of them. The negative criticism over the tie-in was covered by mainstream media outlet New York Post, calling it "one of WWE's saddest moments ever". They were positive about the rest of the show. The match between Priest and Miz was voted as the Worst Match of the Year by readers of the Wrestling Observer Newsletter. Despite the negative criticism towards the zombies, WWE made over US$1 million from Warner Bros. for the promotional tie-in.

== Aftermath ==
"WrestleMania Backlash" would also be used as the title of the 2022 event, however, the 2023 event reverted to the original "Backlash" title but still maintaining the post-WrestleMania theme.

=== Raw ===
The following night on Raw, WWE Champion Bobby Lashley issued an open challenge. Drew McIntyre came out to accept as he was not pinned in the triple threat match, however, MVP stated that it was open to anyone except McIntyre and Braun Strowman—WrestleMania Backlash would in turn be Strowman's final appearance in WWE until he returned on the September 5, 2022, episode of Raw, as he was released from his contract on June 2. In the main event of Raw, it was revealed that the open challenge was just to face Lashley rather than a title match. The New Day's Kofi Kingston answered the challenge and defeated Lashley thanks to McIntyre's distraction. The following week, WWE official Adam Pearce scheduled a match between McIntyre and Kingston where the winner would face Lashley for the WWE Championship at Hell in a Cell, only for it to end in a no-contest after interference from Lashley and MVP. A rematch was scheduled for the May 31 episode where if Lashley and/or MVP were at ringside or interfered in the match, Lashley would be suspended for 90 days without pay; McIntyre defeated Kingston to earn another title match against Lashley at Hell in a Cell. On the June 7 episode, during the contract signing for the match, the match was stipulated as a Hell in a Cell match, and that this would be McIntyre's last chance at the title as long as Lashley was the champion.

Also on Raw, Charlotte Flair confronted WWE officials Adam Pearce and Sonya Deville, demanding another opportunity at Rhea Ripley for the Raw Women's Championship as Flair did not take the pin in the triple threat match. Pearce and Deville stated that if Flair won her match against Asuka, they would consider it. However, Flair lost the match thanks to a distraction from Ripley. A rematch occurred the following week, where Flair defeated Asuka, thus earning another title match against Ripley at Hell in a Cell.

Also on Raw, United States Champion Sheamus faced Ricochet in a non-title rematch. Sheamus again defeated Ricochet.

=== SmackDown ===
On the following SmackDown, WWE official Sonya Deville announced that WWE would be leaving the ThunderDome and returning to live touring, starting with the July 16 episode of SmackDown. She also hosted a parade of champions to celebrate SmackDown's champions. New SmackDown Tag Team Champions Rey Mysterio and Dominik Mysterio, SmackDown Women's Champion Bianca Belair, Intercontinental Champion Apollo Crews (accompanied by Commander Azeez), and WWE Women's Tag Team Champions Natalya and Tamina were all on stage. Deville then introduced Universal Champion Roman Reigns, however, Paul Heyman instead came out, stating that everyone else were just title holders and that Reigns was the only real champion. Bayley then interrupted, claiming that Belair cheated at WrestleMania Backlash by using her hair. Belair and Bayley were scheduled for a rematch at Hell in a Cell, which was later stipulated as a Hell in a Cell match.

Also on the following SmackDown, Cesaro, with his arm in a sling, confronted Universal Champion Roman Reigns and challenged him to another match at Hell in a Cell. However, Seth Rollins attacked Cesaro again, resulting in medical personnel taking Cesaro out on a stretcher. A match between Cesaro and Rollins was later scheduled for Hell in a Cell.

Also on SmackDown. Dominik Mysterio defeated Robert Roode in a singles match. Later that night, The Mysterios (Dominik and Rey Mysterio) were scheduled to defend the SmackDown Tag Team Championship against Roode and Dolph Ziggler the following week. Prior to their match, Rey was attacked backstage, similar to what happened at WrestleMania Backlash, leaving Dominik to face Ziggler and Roode alone. At the climax of the match, Rey made his way to the ring, which distracted Roode and allowed Dominik to pin him to retain the titles. After a successful, albeit controversial, title defense against The Usos (Jey Uso and Jimmy Uso) on the June 4 episode, which ended after interference from Roman Reigns, who brutally attacked Dominik, the Mysterios then entered into a feud with Reigns and The Usos, resulting in Rey challenging Reigns for the Universal Championship.

== Results ==
No.	Results	Stipulations	Times
1^{P}	Sheamus defeated Ricochet by pinfall	Singles match	7:10
2	Rhea Ripley (c) defeated Asuka and Charlotte Flair by pinfall	Triple threat match for the WWE Raw Women's Championship	15:22
3	Dominik Mysterio and Rey Mysterio defeated Dolph Ziggler and Robert Roode (c) by pinfall	Tag team match for the WWE SmackDown Tag Team Championship	17:00
4	Damian Priest defeated The Miz (with John Morrison) by pinfall	Zombie Lumberjack match (Note: The lumberjacks were various WWE Performance Center trainees who were dressed and acted like zombies as a promotional tie-in for the zombie film, Army of the Dead.)	6:55
5	Bianca Belair (c) defeated Bayley by pinfall	Singles match for the WWE SmackDown Women's Championship	15:59
6	Bobby Lashley (c) (with MVP) defeated Braun Strowman and Drew McIntyre by pinfall	Triple threat match for the WWE Championship	14:12
7	Roman Reigns (c) (with Paul Heyman) defeated Cesaro by technical submission	Singles match for the WWE Universal Championship	27:35
(c) / – the champion(s) heading into the match; P / – the match was broadcast on the pre-show
