= Backlash (2009) =

World Wrestling Entertainment pay-per-view event

- Promotional poster featuring Randy Orton
- Promotion: World Wrestling Entertainment
- Brand(s): Raw; SmackDown; ECW
- Date: April 26, 2009
- City: Providence, Rhode Island
- Venue: Dunkin' Donuts Center
- Attendance: 8,357
- Buy rate: 182,000

Pay-per-view chronology
← Previous; WrestleMania 25	Next → Judgment Day

Backlash chronology
← Previous; 2008	Next → 2016

The 2009 Backlash was a professional wrestling pay-per-view (PPV) event produced by World Wrestling Entertainment (WWE), held for wrestlers from the promotion's Raw, SmackDown, and ECW brand divisions. It was the 11th annual Backlash and took place on April 26, 2009, at the Dunkin' Donuts Center in Providence, Rhode Island. The concept of the event was based around the backlash from WrestleMania 25.

The card comprised seven matches, as well as one dark match that occurred before the live broadcast. The main matches saw SmackDown's Edge defeat Raw's John Cena in a Last Man Standing match to win the World Heavyweight Championship, transferring the title to SmackDown, and Randy Orton won Raw's WWE Championship in a six-man tag team match pitting defending champion Triple H, Batista, and Shane McMahon against The Legacy (Orton, Cody Rhodes, and Ted DiBiase); Orton pinned Triple H to win the title. The card also included Jeff Hardy defeating Matt Hardy in an "I Quit" match and Christian winning the ECW Championship by defeating Jack Swagger.

The event received 182,000 pay-per-view buys, down on the previous event's figure of 200,000 buys. This was the second Backlash held at the Dunkin' Donuts Center, after the 1999 event when it was known as the Providence Civic Center. This would also be the final Backlash held until 2016, as in 2010, Extreme Rules was moved up into the April/May slot, which also made it the final Backlash to broadcast exclusively via traditional PPV outlets due to the launch of the WWE Network streaming service in February 2014. Although the event was reinstated in 2016, it was held in September that year, thus the 2009 event was the final Backlash to carry the post-WrestleMania theme until the 2021 event.

This was the final Backlash to feature ECW and the ECW Championship, as the brand was dissolved in February 2010, deactivating the championship along with it, and it was subsequently the final Backlash held before the end of the first brand extension in August 2011. This in turn made it the final Backlash to feature multiple brands until 2018, as the brand split was reintroduced in July 2016, which brought back brand-exclusive PPVs; both the 2016 and 2017 events were held exclusively for SmackDown before brand-exclusive PPVs were again discontinued following WrestleMania 34 in 2018.

== Production ==
=== Background ===
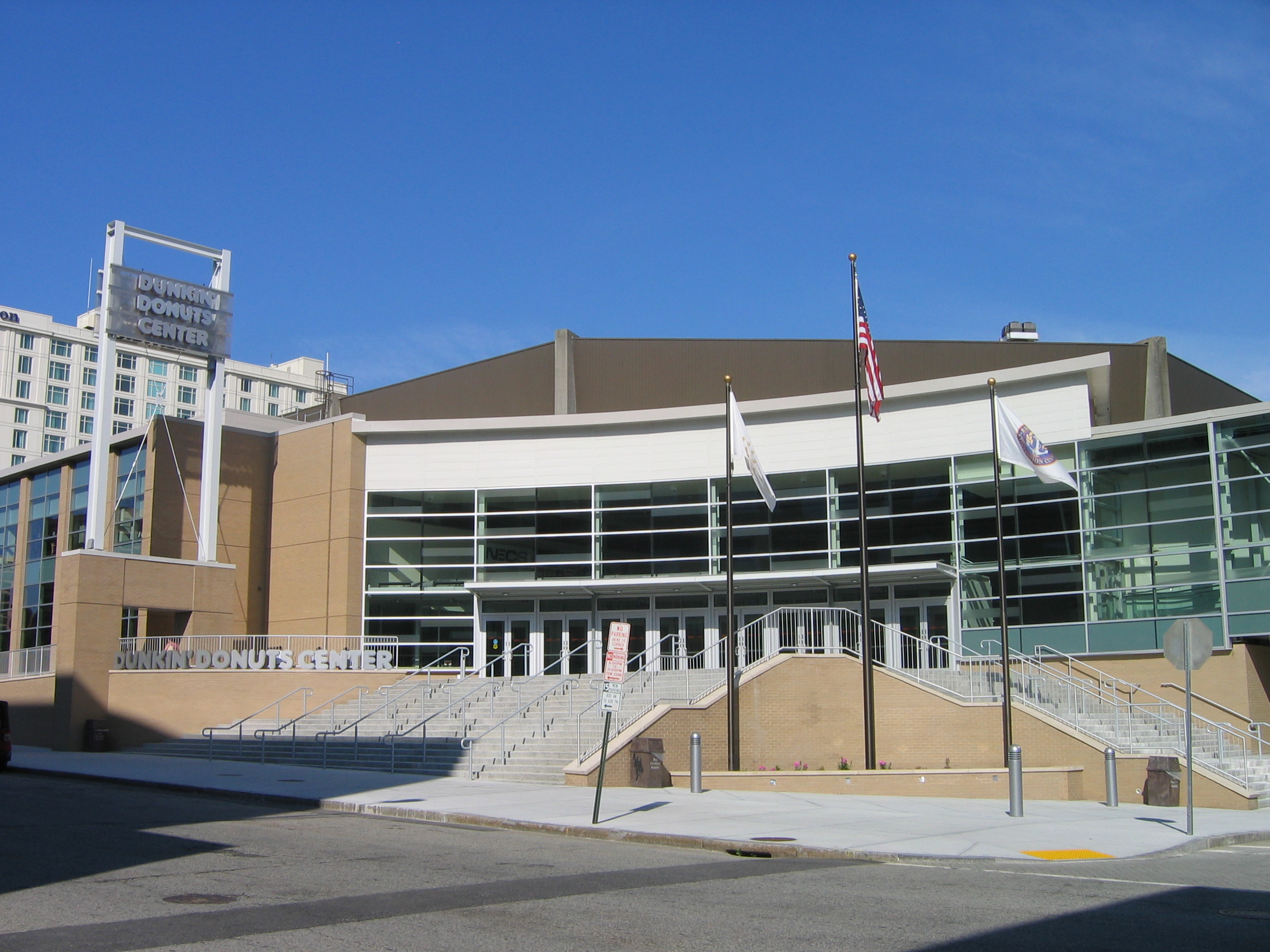
The 11th annual Backlash was the second time for the event to be held at the Dunkin' Donuts Center in Providence, Rhode Island, after the 1999 event when it was known as the Providence Civic Center.

Backlash is a professional wrestling pay-per-view (PPV) event that was established by World Wrestling Entertainment (WWE) in 1999. The concept is based around the backlash from WWE's flagship event, WrestleMania. The 11th event featured the backlash from WrestleMania 25 and was scheduled to take place on April 26, 2009, at the Dunkin' Donuts Center in Providence, Rhode Island. It featured wrestlers from the Raw, SmackDown, and ECW brand divisions. This was the second Backlash held at this venue, after the 1999 event when it was known as the Providence Civic Center.

=== Storylines ===
The event included matches that resulted from scripted storylines. Results were predetermined by WWE's writers on the Raw, SmackDown, and ECW brands, while storylines were produced on WWE's weekly television shows, Raw, SmackDown, and ECW.

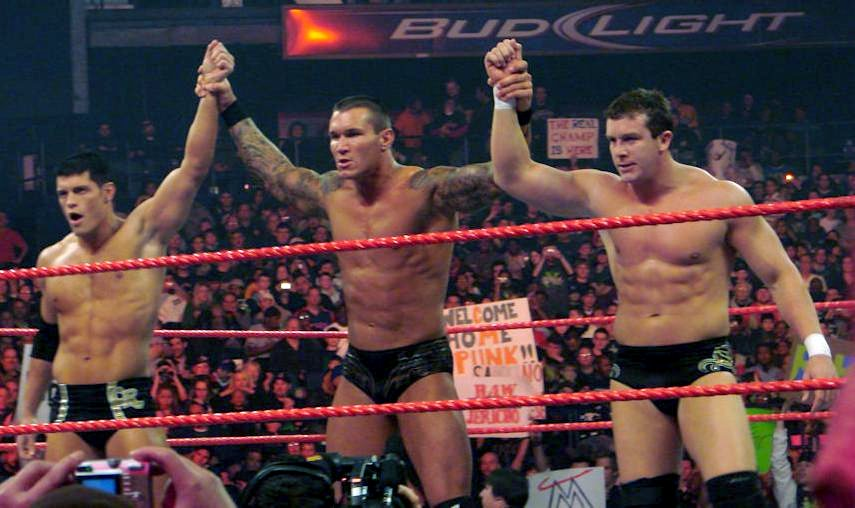
The Legacy: Randy Orton (center), Ted DiBiase (right), and Cody Rhodes (left), competitors in the six-man tag team match for Raw's WWE Championship.

The main rivalry heading into Backlash pitted Triple H against Randy Orton over the WWE Championship. The feud had started on the February 16 episode of Raw, when Orton punted Triple H's brother-in-law, Shane McMahon and then performed the RKO on his wife Stephanie McMahon. As a result, Triple H convinced Orton to challenge him for the WWE Championship at WrestleMania 25. At WrestleMania on April 5, 2009, Triple H defeated Orton to retain the WWE Championship. The following night on Raw, WWE chairman Vince McMahon announced that a six-man tag team match would take place at Backlash between Triple H, Shane McMahon, and himself against The Legacy (Orton, Cody Rhodes, and Ted DiBiase) which was later turned into a WWE Championship match by new general manager of Raw, Vickie Guerrero. That same night, Shane and Triple H were attacked by The Legacy, but were saved by a returning Batista. Vince announced that Batista would be taking his place at Backlash. On the following week's episode of Raw, after returning to WWE the week before, Batista arrived on the night of the WWE Draft lottery. Batista made clear his desire to face Orton on Raw and take revenge for the punt that kept him from the ring for four months. He was later joined in the ring by both Shane McMahon and WWE Champion Triple H, who both wanted to get their hands on Orton for his attacks on Stephanie McMahon and the WWE Chairman himself, Mr. McMahon. As the three argued over who would get first dibs on Orton, they were interrupted by Vickie Guerrero, who announced that only one of them would get the opportunity to face Orton before Backlash, and that they would have to earn it. Guerrero then placed Triple H, Batista and Shane McMahon in a three-on-two handicap match against The Legacy for later in the night. Whichever one of them would score the pinfall on either Rhodes or DiBiase will have earned themselves a match against Orton on the next Raw, but if The Legacy prevailed, then none of the three would be able to get their hands on him. Triple H pinned DiBiase to win the match. On the last episode of Raw, Orton defeated Triple H in a No Disqualification match despite their teammates interfering during the match. Then a few days later on SmackDown, Batista and Shane McMahon defeated DiBiase and Rhodes in a tag team match.

Another rivalry heading into Backlash was an interpromotional feud between Raw's John Cena and SmackDown's Edge over the World Heavyweight Championship. At No Way Out on February 15, 2009, Edge attacked Kofi Kingston, who was due to compete in Raw's Elimination Chamber match for Cena's World Heavyweight Championship. As a result, Edge took his spot in the match and subsequently won the World Heavyweight Championship by last eliminating Rey Mysterio, transferring the title to SmackDown. At WrestleMania 25, Cena defeated the defending champion Edge and Big Show in a triple threat match to win back the title and transfer it back to Raw. On the April 6 episode of Raw, Vickie Guerrero announced that Cena would defend his World Heavyweight Championship against Edge in a Last Man Standing match at Backlash.

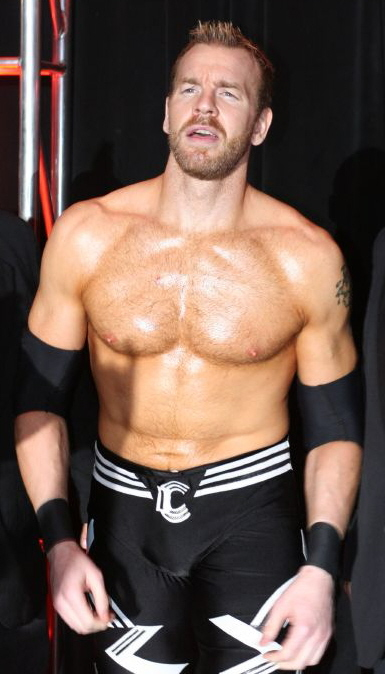
Christian, challenger for the ECW Championship at Backlash.

Interim General manager Tiffany announced on the April 7 episode of ECW that Jack Swagger would defend his ECW Championship against the winner of the "elimination chase", which commenced on that night and involved Christian, Tommy Dreamer, Finlay, and Mark Henry; the participants in the chase would have a four-way that night. Henry got pinned the same night and was eliminated from contention. The remaining three wrestlers competed in a triple threat match on the April 14 episode of ECW on Sci Fi with the person being pinned or forced to submit being eliminated from contention; Dreamer was pinned in this contest, leading to a singles match between Finlay and Christian on the April 16 episode of WWE Superstars, which saw Christian get the victory, thus allowing him to face Swagger for the title at Backlash.

After Matt Hardy betrayed his brother, Jeff, at the Royal Rumble — costing the latter the WWE Championship against Edge — the two embarked on a feud that saw Jeff initially reluctant to fight his brother; after much goading, they had a match at WrestleMania 25, which saw Matt win; however, with Jeff not fully incapacitated after Matt had vowed to "erase Jeff from WWE", a stretcher match took place between the two, which Matt also won. As a result of their feud, the SmackDown general manager, Theodore Long, announced an "I Quit" match between the two at Backlash.

After the release of the film, The Wrestler, and the film's actor Mickey Rourke backing out of a challenge that he had earlier issued to Chris Jericho to a match at WrestleMania 25, Jericho started targeting WWE's legends and Hall of Famers by insulting and beating them over many weeks on Raw. (These legends included the likes of Ric Flair, Roddy Piper, Jimmy Snuka, and Ricky Steamboat.) At WrestleMania 25, Jericho defeated Piper, Snuka and Steamboat in a handicap elimination match. After winning, Jericho called Rourke out in the ring. During the confrontation between the two, Rourke knocked Jericho down with a punch. Then, on the April 20 episode of Raw, it was announced that Jericho would face Ricky Steamboat in a singles match at Backlash.

== Event ==
Other on-screen personnel
Role:	Name:
English commentators	Michael Cole
English commentators	Jim Ross
English commentators	Jerry Lawler
Spanish commentators	Carlos Cabrera
Spanish commentators	Hugo Savinovich
Ring announcers	Lilian Garcia
Ring announcers	Justin Roberts
Referees	Mike Chioda
Referees	John Cone
Referees	Charles Robinson

Before the event aired live on pay-per-view, Kofi Kingston defeated Dolph Ziggler in a dark match.

=== Preliminary matches ===
The actual pay-per-view began with Jack Swagger defending the ECW Championship against Christian. Swagger controlled the match with takedowns, suplexes and slams. After both men removed the padding on a turnbuckle, Christian avoided Swagger, causing Swagger to collide with the exposed turnbuckle. Christian then executed a Killswitch to win the ECW Championship.

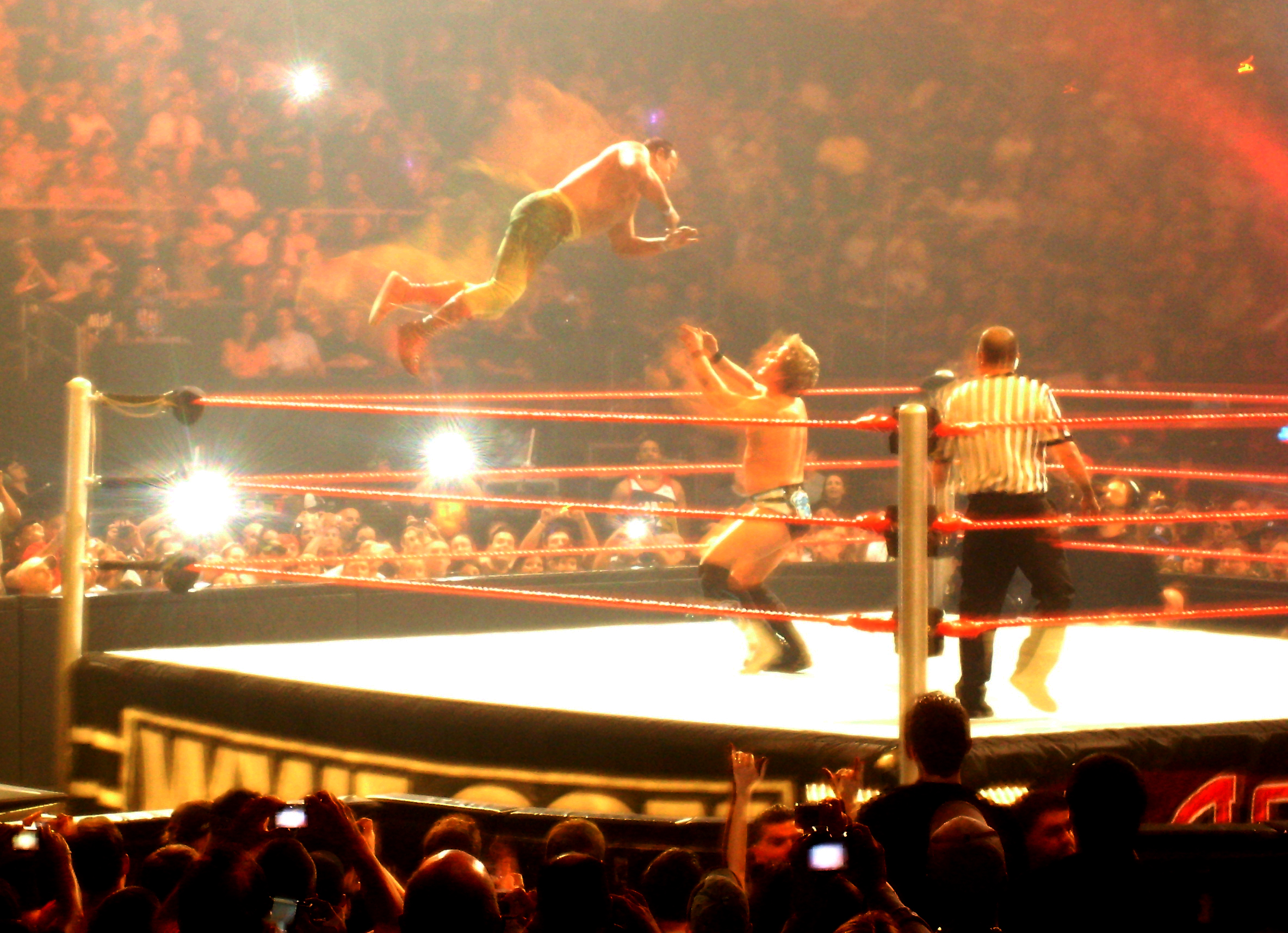
Ricky "The Dragon" Steamboat jumping toward Chris Jericho.

The following contest involved Chris Jericho and Ricky Steamboat — the latter competing in his first singles match since 1994. As Steamboat attempted a diving crossbody, Jericho countered with a Codebreaker and forced Steamboat to submit to the Walls of Jericho for the win. Following the match, Steamboat was given a standing ovation from the crowd in attendance.

CM Punk wrestled Kane next, with Punk mainly attacking Kane's arm with kicks and arm bars to prevent him from performing the chokeslam. After Punk tried to incapacitate his opponent, Kane managed to execute a leg-trap chokeslam for the win.

Next was the "I Quit" match pitting Matt Hardy against Jeff Hardy. The two attacked each other with a number of heavy shots and submission holds during the match. After Jeff placed Matt on a table, he tied him to the table and set up a ladder in the corner of the ring. When the referee asked Matt if he wanted to quit, he took the opportunity to talk down Jeff, bringing up the case of what his father and late mother would think of this before quitting, meaning Jeff won the match. After the match, Jeff vaulted over the ladder and performed a leg drop through the table on Matt.

Santina Marella (really Santino Marella in drag posing as his fictitious twin sister) came down to the ring after the match, and proclaimed her prowess before The Great Khali entered in the hopes of kissing Marella, only to have Marella refuse, claiming to love another man, SmackDown commentator, Jim Ross, who sat at ringside with Jerry Lawler and Michael Cole. Beth Phoenix came to the ring and challenged Marella for her title of Miss WrestleMania. Before the match started, Khali attacked Phoenix with a brain chop, leading to Marella pinning Phoenix to retain her title.

=== Main event matches ===
A six-man tag team match for the WWE Championship pitting champion Triple H, Batista, and Shane McMahon against The Legacy (Randy Orton, Cody Rhodes, and Ted DiBiase) was next with the stipulation that if Triple H or any member of his team got counted out, disqualified, pinned, or submitted, Orton would become the new WWE champion. The match started with Triple H and Orton brawling to the backstage area while Batista and McMahon continued to wrestle The Legacy. Once the two fought their way back to the ring, the match revolved around The Legacy isolating every member of their opponents, preventing any way for them to make a tag. After Batista was tagged in, the action went outside of the ring. Triple H was tagged back in, and Batista was about to use a steel chair outside on The Legacy, but per the stipulation, Triple H would have lost the title on disqualification, leading to Triple H stopping Batista. The distraction was enough for Orton to strike Triple H with an RKO, but Triple H still kicked out at two. The bell was rung without the referee signaling for it, leading to the referee being distracted long enough for Orton to nail Triple H with a devastating punt. Orton then pinned Triple H to win the title. Following the match, Triple H was taken out on a stretcher.

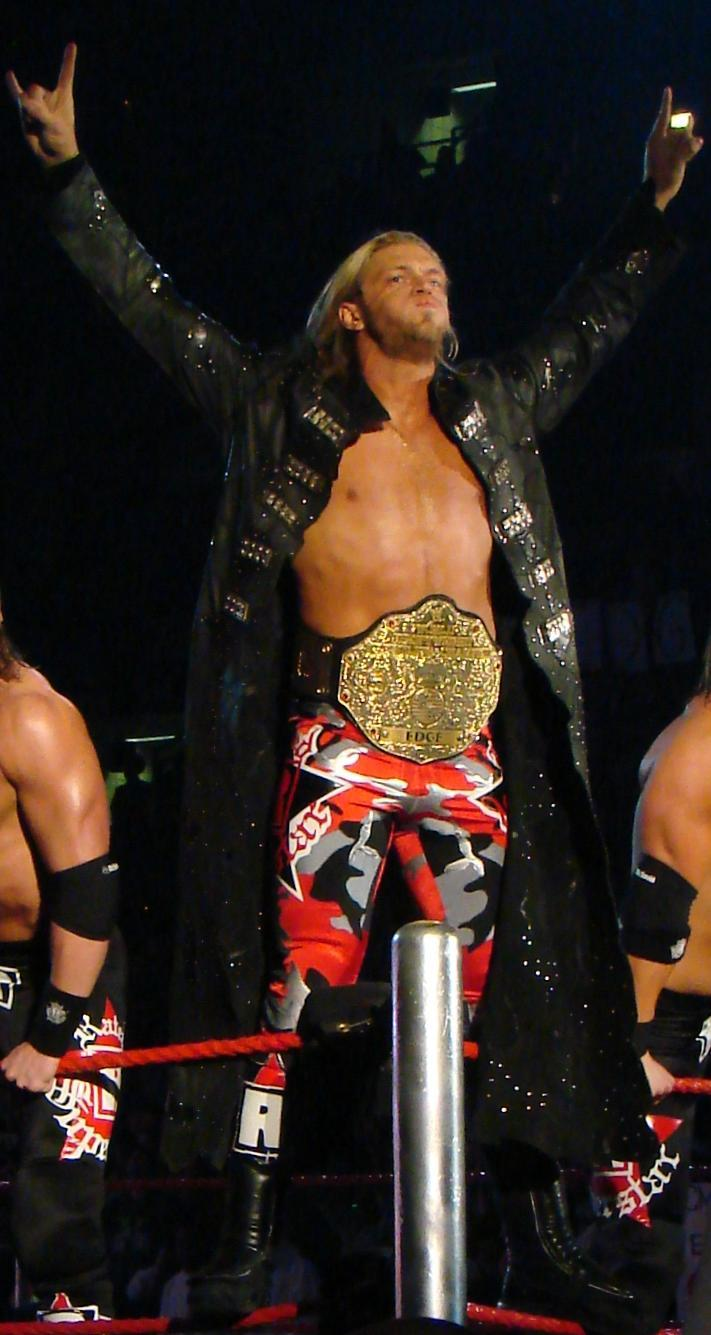
SmackDown's Edge defeated Raw's John Cena to win the World Heavyweight Championship for a record-tying fifth time; as a result of the win, the title was transferred from Raw to SmackDown.

In the main event, John Cena defended the World Heavyweight Championship against Edge in a Last Man Standing match. The match started as a heavy brawl between the two but ended up on the outside, with Edge and Cena using the steel steps as a weapon, as they threw each other into it, threw it at each other. Edge executed a spear on Cena. After the two ended up on the broadcast table, Cena threw Edge into the crowd with the Attitude Adjustment. The two fought around the arena, going into the surrounding lobby until they made their way to the stage, leading to interference from Big Show, who chokeslammed Cena through a nearby spotlight that exploded; Cena was unable to stand, meaning Edge won the title. Cena was taken out of the arena on a stretcher as the event came to a close.

== Reception ==
The show received positive feedback from many viewers. Canadian sportswriter, Matt Bishop, gave the show an overall score of 7/10; most of his praise for the show concentrated on the World Heavyweight title match, which he awarded 9/10. In addition, Dave Meltzer, writer of the Wrestling Observer Newsletter, called the show solid, and gave the main event a score of four-and-a-half stars out of five.

The Baltimore Sun's writer, Kevin Eck, praised the World Heavyweight Championship match, calling it a "show-stealer" and praised the Jericho/Steamboat match, stating that "The booking here was well done, as Steamboat showed that he can still go".

In 2013, WWE released a list of their "15 best pay-per-views ever", with 2009's Backlash being ranked at #13.

== Aftermath ==
=== Raw ===
Following the results of the main event, Big Show appeared in a match against Batista the following night on Raw to determine who would challenge Randy Orton next for the WWE Championship. During the match, John Cena came down to the ring, distracting Big Show, which led to Batista winning the match. Vickie Guerrero would subsequently announce Big Show would wrestle Cena at Judgment Day, when Cena would be medically cleared to compete in the match.

=== SmackDown ===
With Edge winning the World Heavyweight title, the title became exclusive to SmackDown, with Jeff Hardy becoming the number-one contender to face Edge at Judgment Day by winning a fatal four-way match against Chris Jericho, Rey Mysterio, and Kane.

=== ECW ===
Not satisfied at how he lost the title (due to his collision with a turnbuckle exposed by Christian, which is technically illegal, Jack Swagger would invoke his rematch clause at Judgment Day, and before that match were to take place, he would make sure that no one would receive a title match before he did by interfering in Christian's matches.

=== Future ===
In 2010, Backlash was discontinued and replaced by Extreme Rules. Also in February that year, the ECW brand was disbanded and the brand extension itself was dissolved in August 2011. Also, in April 2011, the promotion ceased going by its full name of World Wrestling Entertainment, with "WWE" becoming an orphaned initialism. In February 2014, WWE launched their online streaming service, the WWE Network, and in addition to traditional PPV, the events also became available on the Network. In mid-2016, WWE reintroduced the brand split and also brought back brand-exclusive PPVs. Due to the need for more PPV events, Backlash was reinstated, and the 2016 event was held exclusively for the SmackDown-brand and was WWE's first brand-exclusive PPV of the second brand split. Backlash that year was also held in September after SummerSlam, thus ending its previous tradition of being the post-WrestleMania PPV. In 2021, however, the event returned to its post-WrestleMania position and was in turn titled WrestleMania Backlash.

This Backlash would also be the final to feature the previous World Heavyweight Championship, as well as the original versions of the World Tag Team Championship and the WWE Women's Championship. The World Tag Team Championship, which had been held in tandem with the WWE Tag Team Championship as the Unified WWE Tag Team Championship, was retired in August 2010 in favor of continuing the WWE Tag Team Championship, which was renamed as the Raw Tag Team Championship in 2016 and then the World Tag Team Championship in 2024. The WWE Women's Championship was unified with the WWE Divas Championship in September 2010 and it was retired in favor of the Divas Championship, which itself was retired in April 2016 in favor of a new WWE Women's Championship. The World Heavyweight Championship was retired after it was unified with the WWE Championship in December 2013, and then a new World Heavyweight Championship was introduced in April 2023.

== Results ==
No.	Results	Stipulations	Times
1^{D}	Kofi Kingston defeated Dolph Ziggler	Singles match	—
2	Christian defeated Jack Swagger (c) by pinfall	Singles match for the ECW Championship	10:55
3	Chris Jericho defeated Ricky Steamboat by submission	Singles match	12:32
4	Kane defeated CM Punk by pinfall	Singles match	9:25
5	Jeff Hardy defeated Matt Hardy	"I Quit" match	19:01
6	Santina Marella (c) defeated Beth Phoenix (with Rosa Mendes) by pinfall	Singles match for the title of "Miss WrestleMania"	0:03
7	The Legacy (Cody Rhodes, Randy Orton and Ted DiBiase) defeated Batista, Shane McMahon and Triple H (c) by pinfall	Six-man tag team match for the WWE Championship; If Triple H or any member of his team had gotten disqualified, counted out, pinned, or submitted, Orton would win the title. Orton pinned Triple H to win the title.	22:50
8	Edge defeated John Cena (c)	Last Chance Last Man Standing match for the World Heavyweight Championship	28:25
(c) / – the champion(s) heading into the match; D / – this was a dark match
