= "I Quit" match =

Professional wrestling match type

An "I Quit" match is a type of professional wrestling submission match in which the only way to win is to make the opponent verbally concede to the referee into a microphone. It is a variation of the submission match as it can only be won by submission, but it is special in that the submission has to take the form of the forfeiting opponent conceding verbally. Generally, whenever a wrestler knocks down their opponent with a move or inflicts a submission move, the opponent will be asked—either by the referee or the opponent—to say the concession into a microphone. "I quit" matches are commonly used to settle (kayfabe) grudges and embarrass rivals since saying "I quit" is usually a sign of admitted inferiority.

== History ==
The first "I quit" match was in the National Wrestling Alliance (NWA)/Jim Crockett Promotions at Starrcade on November 28, 1985. Magnum T. A. defeated Tully Blanchard in a match (with a cage around the ring) for Blanchard's NWA United States Heavyweight Championship. Near the end of that match, Magnum used a piece of wood with a nail in it to pierce Blanchard's forehead. At that point, Blanchard screamed "Yes! Yes!" into the microphone, indicating that he was conceding the match, awarding Magnum the championship.

One of the most famous "I quit" matches took place on January 24, 1999, at the Royal Rumble between The Rock and Mick Foley (as Mankind) in the World Wrestling Federation (WWF, now WWE) for the WWF Championship. The match lasted just over 20 minutes, ending after Foley took eleven unprotected chair shots to the head while his hands were handcuffed behind his back. The Rock eventually won the match, but it was later revealed that Foley was completely unconscious and The Rock had played a tape of Foley's concession announcement over the public address system. The following night on Raw, The Rock's "I quit!" match against Triple H ended when Triple H was extorted into a verbal concession because Kane was about to chokeslam Chyna. John Cena retained his WWE Championship by defeating John "Bradshaw" Layfield (JBL) in an "I quit" match at Judgment Day on May 22, 2005. At Breaking Point on September 13, 2009, Cena defeated his long time rival Randy Orton in an "I quit" match to win the WWE Championship, forcing Orton to verbally concede while he was handcuffed and Cena simultaneously had applied his submission hold, the STF.

"I quit" matches involving women have been rare. At No Mercy on October 19, 2003, there was an intergender match between WWE chairman Vince McMahon and his daughter Stephanie partly under "I quit" rules. However, the match was decided when Stephanie's mother Linda threw in the towel for her daughter, giving Vince the victory. The first "I quit" match between WWE Divas was contested at One Night Stand on June 1, 2008, when Beth Phoenix defeated Melina.

On the May 14, 2009 episode of Impact, Total Nonstop Action Wrestling (TNA) put on its first "I quit" match, where Booker T defeated Jethro Holiday after an axe kick.

On the May 4, 2016 episode of Lucha Underground, Sexy Star defeated Mariposa in the promotion's first "I quit" match, known in Spanish as a "no mas" ("no more") match.

An "I respect you" match is a variation of the "I quit" match where the winning concession was "I respect you". The first "I respect you" match was held in World Championship Wrestling (WCW) at SuperBrawl VI on February 11, 1996, and pitted Brian Pillman and Kevin Sullivan. At the end of the match, Pillman conceded by saying "I respect you, bookerman!". In doing so, Pillman broke kayfabe as Sullivan was also WCW booker at the time.

One January 17, 2017 episode of WWE 205 Live, Jack Gallagher defeated Ariya Daivari in an "I forfeit" match where that phrase was the conceding phrase.

== Matches ==
=== All Elite Wrestling ===
Participants	Title on the line/ Stipulation	Event	Date	Location	Notes	Ref
Jon Moxley (c) defeated Eddie Kingston	AEW World Championship	Full Gear	November 7, 2020	Jacksonville, Florida		
Adam Copeland defeated Christian Cage (c)	AEW TNT Championship	Dynamite	March 20, 2024	Toronto, Ontario, Canada		
Darby Allin defeated Jon Moxley	none	WrestleDream	October 18, 2025	St. Louis, Missouri		
Cage and Cope (Adam Copeland and Christian Cage) defeated FTR (Dax Harwood and Cash Wheeler) (c)	AEW World Tag Team Championship	Double or Nothing	May 24, 2026	Queens, New York		

=== Extreme Championship Wrestling ===
Participants	Title on the line/ Stipulation	Event	Date	Location	Notes	Ref
Terry Funk defeated Eddie Gilbert	none	ECW Show	January 23, 1993	Philadelphia, Pennsylvania	Billed as an I Quit Texas Death match	
Tommy Dreamer defeated The Sandman	none	ECW Show	October 1, 1994	Philadelphia, Pennsylvania		
Tommy Dreamer defeated C. W. Anderson	none	Guilty as Charged	January 7, 2001	New York, New York		

=== Lucha Underground ===
In the promotion, "I quit" matches are billed as a "No Más Match," with the submission phrase was made in Spanish ("No más").

Participants	Title on the line/ Stipulation	Event	Date	Location	Notes	Ref
Sexy Star defeated Mariposa	Aztec Medallions	Lucha Underground (Season 2, Ep 15)	December 13, 2015 (taped); May 4, 2016 (aired)	Boyle Heights, California		
XO Lishus defeated Jack Evans	none	Lucha Underground (Season 4, Ep 12)	March 2018 (taped); August 29, 2018 (aired)	Downtown Los Angeles, California		

=== Ring of Honor ===
Participants	Title on the line/ Stipulation	Event	Date	Location	Notes	Ref
Alex Shelley defeated Jimmy Jacobs	none	Joe vs. Punk II	October 16, 2004	Chicago Ridge, Illinois		
Jimmy Rave defeated Nigel McGuinness	none	Battle of the Icons	January 27, 2007	Edison, New Jersey	The referee stopped the match after McGuinness refused to say "I quit" and Rave attempted to break his leg.	
Austin Aries defeated Jimmy Jacobs	none	Rising Above	November 22, 2008	Chicago Ridge, Illinois		
Colt Cabana defeated Steve Corino	none	Richards vs. Daniels	October 16, 2010	Chicago Ridge, Illinois		
Ethan Page defeated Tony Nese	none	Final Battle	December 15, 2023	Garland, Texas		

=== Total Nonstop Action Wrestling/Impact Wrestling ===
Participants	Title on the line/ Stipulation	Event	Date	Location	Notes	Ref
Booker T defeated Jethro Holliday	none	Impact!	May 14, 2009 (aired)	Orlando, Florida		
A.J. Styles (c) defeated Booker T	TNA Legends Championship	Sacrifice	May 24, 2009	Orlando, Florida		
Velvet Sky vs. Angelina Love ended in a no contest	none	Impact!	April 6, 2010 (taped); April 12, 2010 (aired)	Orlando, Florida	Match was the result of an open contract won by Sky and was changed from a Leather and Lace match immediately before it started. Love was handcuffed during this match. Match was thrown out after The Beautiful People and Tara interfered.	
Brian Kendrick defeated Douglas Williams	none	Impact!	July 15, 2010 (aired)	Orlando, Florida		
A.J. Styles defeated Tommy Dreamer	none	No Surrender	September 5, 2010	Orlando, Florida		
A.J. Styles defeated Christopher Daniels	none	Bound For Glory	October 16, 2011	Philadelphia, Pennsylvania		
Kurt Angle defeated D'Lo Brown	none	Impact!	April 25, 2013 (taped)	Orlando, Florida		
Gunner defeated James Storm	none	Sacrifice	April 27, 2014	Orlando, Florida		
Mr. Anderson defeated Samuel Shaw	none	Impact Wrestling: Hardcore Justice	August 5, 2014 (taped); August 21, 2014 (aired)	Orlando, Florida		
Kurt Angle (c) defeated Eric Young	TNA World Heavyweight Championship	Impact!	May 29, 2015 (aired)	Orlando, Florida		
Jeff Hardy vs. Matt Hardy ended in a no contest	none	Impact!	April 19, 2016 (aired)	Orlando, Florida	Match ended after neither man could continue	
Willie Mack defeated Moose	none	Genesis	January 9, 2021	Nashville, Tennessee		
Mike Santana defeated Josh Alexander	none	Genesis	January 19, 2025	Garland, Texas		

=== World Championship Wrestling ===
Participants	Title on the line/ Stipulation	Event	Date	Location	Notes	Ref
The Taskmaster defeated Brian Pillman	none	SuperBrawl VI	February 11, 1996	St. Petersburg, Florida	This was an "I Respect You" Strap match.	
Goldberg defeated Sid Vicious	none	Mayhem	November 21, 1999	Toronto, Ontario, Canada		
Roddy Piper defeated Creative Control (Gerald and Patrick)	none	Nitro	December 6, 1999	Milwaukee, Wisconsin	This was a Handicap "I quit" match.	
David Flair defeated Terry Funk	none	Nitro	February 7, 2000	Tulsa, Oklahoma		
Dustin Rhodes defeated Terry Funk	none	Uncensored	March 19, 2000	Miami, Florida	This was a Bullrope Match.	
Norman Smiley (c) defeated M.I. Smooth	WCW Hardcore Championship	Thunder	August 22, 2000 (taped); August 23, 2000 (aired)	Tulsa, Oklahoma		

=== World Wrestling Federation/Entertainment ===
Participants	Title on the line/ Stipulation	Event	Date	Location	Notes	Ref
Bret Hart defeated Bob Backlund	none	WrestleMania XI	April 2, 1995	Hartford, Connecticut	Guest referee Roddy Piper ended the match though Backlund uttered the words "I quit" only incompletely	
Stone Cold Steve Austin defeated Ken Shamrock	none	Raw Is War	October 26, 1998	Madison, Wisconsin	Austin used the unconscious Shamrock's hands to signal a tap out submission.	
The Rock defeated Mankind (c)	WWF Championship	Royal Rumble	January 24, 1999	Anaheim, California	Mankind did not say "I quit", instead an earlier recording of Mankind saying the phrase was played over the PA system while Mankind laid unconscious in the entrance. The Rock was still awarded the victory.	
The Rock (c) defeated Triple H	WWF Championship	Raw Is War	January 25, 1999	Phoenix, Arizona		
Mr. McMahon defeated Stephanie McMahon	Loser had to leave their position: Vince McMahon - WWE Chairman; Stephanie McMahon - General manager of SmackDown!	No Mercy	October 19, 2003	Baltimore, Maryland	Stephanie did not say the words "I quit"; Linda McMahon threw a towel into the ring. Stephanie was also able to win this match via pinfall.	
John Cena (c) defeated John Bradshaw Layfield	WWE Championship	Judgment Day	May 22, 2005	Minneapolis, Minnesota		
Ric Flair defeated Mick Foley	none	SummerSlam	August 20, 2006	Boston, Massachusetts		
Chavo Guerrero defeated Rey Mysterio	none	SmackDown!	October 15, 2006 (taped); October 20, 2006 (aired)	Los Angeles, California		
Rey Mysterio defeated Chavo Guerrero	none	Smackdown!	September 1, 2007 (taped); September 7, 2007 (aired)	Cincinnati, Ohio		
Beth Phoenix defeated Melina	none	One Night Stand	June 1, 2008	San Diego, California		
Big Show defeated Ryan Taylor	none	Smackdown!	October 14, 2008 (taped); October 17, 2008 (aired)	Las Vegas, Nevada		
Jeff Hardy defeated Matt Hardy	none	Backlash	April 26, 2009	Providence, Rhode Island		
John Cena defeated Randy Orton (c)	WWE Championship	Breaking Point	September 13, 2009	Montreal, Quebec, Canada	If anyone had interfered on Orton's behalf, he would have immediately lost the title.	
John Cena (c) defeated Batista	WWE Championship	Over The Limit	May 23, 2010	Detroit, Michigan		
John Cena (c) defeated The Miz	WWE Championship	Over The Limit	May 22, 2011	Seattle, Washington		
Alberto Del Rio defeated Jack Swagger	#1 contendership to the World Heavyweight Championship	Extreme Rules	May 19, 2013	St. Louis, Missouri		
John Cena (c) defeated Rusev	WWE United States Championship	Payback	May 17, 2015	Baltimore, Maryland	Instead of Rusev, his manager Lana conceded the match, saying "He quits".	
Jack Gallagher defeated Ariya Daivari	none	205 Live	January 17, 2017	Memphis, Tennessee	Billed as an "I forfeit" match.	
Cedric Alexander defeated Noam Dar	none	205 Live	July 11, 2017	San Antonio, Texas		
Kay Lee Ray (c) defeated Toni Storm	NXT UK Women's Championship	NXT UK	January 18, 2020 (taped); February 27, 2020 (aired)	York, England	This was a Last Chance "I quit" match. Since Storm lost, she could no longer challenge for the NXT UK Women's Championship as long as Ray held it.	
Roman Reigns (c) defeated Jey Uso	WWE Universal Championship	Hell in a Cell	October 25, 2020	Orlando, Florida	This was the first ever Hell in a Cell match contested under an "I quit" stipulation and therefore the first "I quit" match contested inside the Hell in a Cell structure.	
Ronda Rousey defeated Charlotte Flair in an "I quit" Beat the Clock Special Challenge; Rousey defeated Shotzi in 1:41; Charlotte Flair lost when she couldn't beat Aliyah within that time.	Since Rousey won, she earned a match for the WWE SmackDown Women's Championship at WrestleMania Backlash	SmackDown	April 22, 2022 (taped); April 29, 2022 (aired)	Albany, New York	This was a Beat the Clock challenge contested under an "I quit" stipulation. There were two matches, both contested under the stipulation. Rousey set the time of 1:41, but Flair couldn't beat Aliyah within the time limit, giving Rousey the win.	
Ronda Rousey defeated Charlotte Flair (c)	WWE SmackDown Women's Championship	WrestleMania Backlash	May 8, 2022	Providence, Rhode Island		
Finn Bálor defeated Edge	none	Extreme Rules	October 8, 2022	Philadelphia, Pennsylvania		
Cody Rhodes (c) defeated AJ Styles	Undisputed WWE Championship	Clash at the Castle: Scotland	June 15, 2024	Glasgow, Scotland		
Kendal Grey defeated Wendy Choo	none	Evolve	August 8, 2025 (taped); September 17, 2025 (aired)	Orlando, Florida		
