= Over the Limit (2010) =

World Wrestling Entertainment pay-per-view event

- Promotional poster featuring Edge
- Promotion: World Wrestling Entertainment
- Brand(s): Raw; SmackDown
- Date: May 23, 2010
- City: Detroit, Michigan
- Venue: Joe Louis Arena
- Attendance: 11,000
- Buy rate: 197,000

Pay-per-view chronology
← Previous; Extreme Rules	Next → Fatal 4-Way

Over the Limit chronology
← Previous; First	Next → 2011

The 2010 Over the Limit was a professional wrestling pay-per-view (PPV) event produced by World Wrestling Entertainment (WWE). It was the inaugural Over the Limit and took place on May 23, 2010, at the Joe Louis Arena in Detroit, Michigan, held for wrestlers from the promotion's Raw and SmackDown brand divisions. The name "Over the Limit" was a reference to its main event match being contested as an "I Quit" match.

Nine matches took place at the event, eight of which were broadcast live on pay-per-view. In the main event, which was the main match from Raw, John Cena faced Batista for the WWE Championship in an "I Quit" match, while Big Show versus World Heavyweight Champion Jack Swagger was the main match from SmackDown. Matches on the undercard included Randy Orton against Edge, CM Punk facing Rey Mysterio, and Drew McIntyre defending SmackDown's Intercontinental Championship against Kofi Kingston. Other championships defended at the event were Raw's WWE Divas Championship and the Unified WWE Tag Team Championship, which was available to both brands.

The event replaced Judgment Day as the annual May PPV. It drew 197,000 pay-per-view buys and was attended live by 11,000 people. Reviews for the event were generally negative, with reviewers criticizing the endings of the matches, stoppages for blood, and predictable match results. Five wrestlers sustained legitimate injuries during the course of the show, being Batista, John Cena, CM Punk, Randy Orton, and Ted DiBiase.

== Production ==
=== Background ===
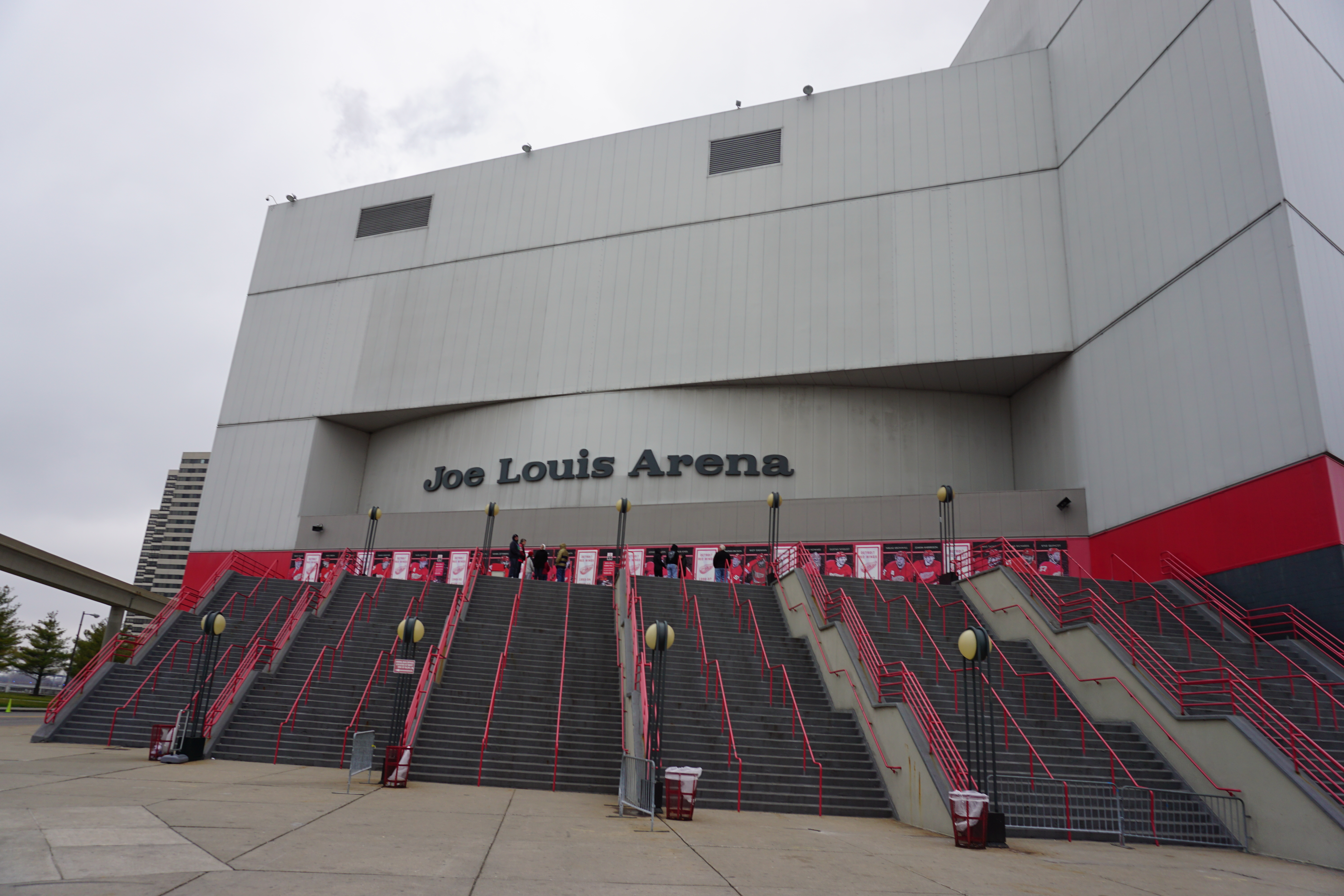
The inaugural Over the Limit was held at the Joe Louis Arena in Detroit, Michigan.

From 2000 to 2009, World Wrestling Entertainment (WWE) ran an annual professional wrestling pay-per-view (PPV) event every May titled Judgment Day. In 2010, WWE discontinued Judgment Day and replaced it with a new PPV event titled Over the Limit. The event was held on May 23, 2010, at the Joe Louis Arena in Detroit, Michigan and featured wrestlers from the Raw and SmackDown brands. Tickets went on sale on March 20. The name "Over the Limit" was a reference to its main event match being contested as an "I Quit" match.

=== Storylines ===
The event included matches that resulted from scripted storylines. Results were predetermined by WWE's writers on the Raw and SmackDown brands, while storylines were produced on WWE's weekly television shows, Raw and SmackDown.

The main feud from the Raw brand heading into Over the Limit was between John Cena and Batista over the WWE Championship, and had been going on for several months. Cena retained the WWE Championship against Batista at the Extreme Rules pay-per-view in a Last Man Standing match, by taping Batista's ankles to the ringpost to ensure he could not stand up by the count of ten. The next night on Raw, Batista defeated Randy Orton and Sheamus to become the number one contender to the championship and earn a rematch against Cena. On the May 3 episode of Raw, they competed in a Beat the Clock challenge to determine the stipulation for their match. Batista defeated Daniel Bryan in 5:06, but Cena defeated Wade Barrett in 4:32 to win the challenge and the right to name the stipulation. The following week, Cena announced that the match would be an "I Quit" match.

The predominant feud from the SmackDown brand was between Jack Swagger and The Big Show, over Swagger's World Heavyweight Championship. As part of the 2010 WWE Draft, Big Show was drafted to SmackDown, where he was named the number one contender upon his debut on April 30. Over the next several weeks, Big Show chokeslammed Swagger through the announce table, and interrupted a promo on the May 14 episode of SmackDown, in which Swagger was boasting about his accomplishments. As part of the segment, Big Show destroyed Swagger's trophies and memorabilia. The following week, Big Show mocked Swagger in promos throughout the show and distracted Swagger during Swagger's match with Kofi Kingston, allowing Kingston to win.

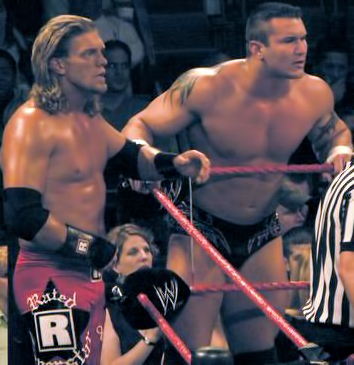
Former tag team partners Edge (left) and Randy Orton (right) were feuding prior to Over the Limit.

As part of the 2010 WWE Draft on April 26, Edge was drafted to the Raw brand. Later that night, Edge interfered in a match to determine the number one contender to the WWE Championship, spearing Randy Orton and preventing Orton from receiving a WWE Championship match. The following week, Edge hosted an edition of his talk show, The Cutting Edge, with Orton as his special guest. During the show, Edge justified his actions by saying he was trying to make an impact, and attempted to convince Orton to reform Rated-RKO, their former tag team. Instead Orton attacked Edge. The following week, Orton defeated Edge and Ted DiBiase in a handicap match, which led to "Pick Your Poison" matches on the May 17 episode of Raw, where Edge and Orton picked each other's opponents for the night. Edge faced The Undertaker, and lost intentionally by countout, while Orton faced Jack Swagger, and lost by disqualification when Edge interfered.

The rivalry between Rey Mysterio and CM Punk was continued from several previous pay-per-views. After months of feuding, Mysterio challenged Punk to a Straight Edge Society Pledge vs. Hair match at Over the Limit. Had Punk won, Mysterio would have joined the Straight Edge Society, Punk's faction which promoted the straight edge lifestyle. Had Mysterio won however, Punk agreed to have his head shaved. On May 14, Mysterio and Punk faced each other in a singles match, but the Straight Edge Society (Luke Gallows, Serena, and a mystery masked man) interfered and attacked Mysterio. The following week, Mysterio interrupted an initiation ceremony, in which Punk was shaving the heads of three men to induct them into the Straight Edge Society, and mocked Punk, claiming everyone would be laughing at Punk when he was shaved bald at Over the Limit. Later that night, Mysterio teamed with Montel Vontavious Porter to defeat Punk and Gallows in a tag team match.

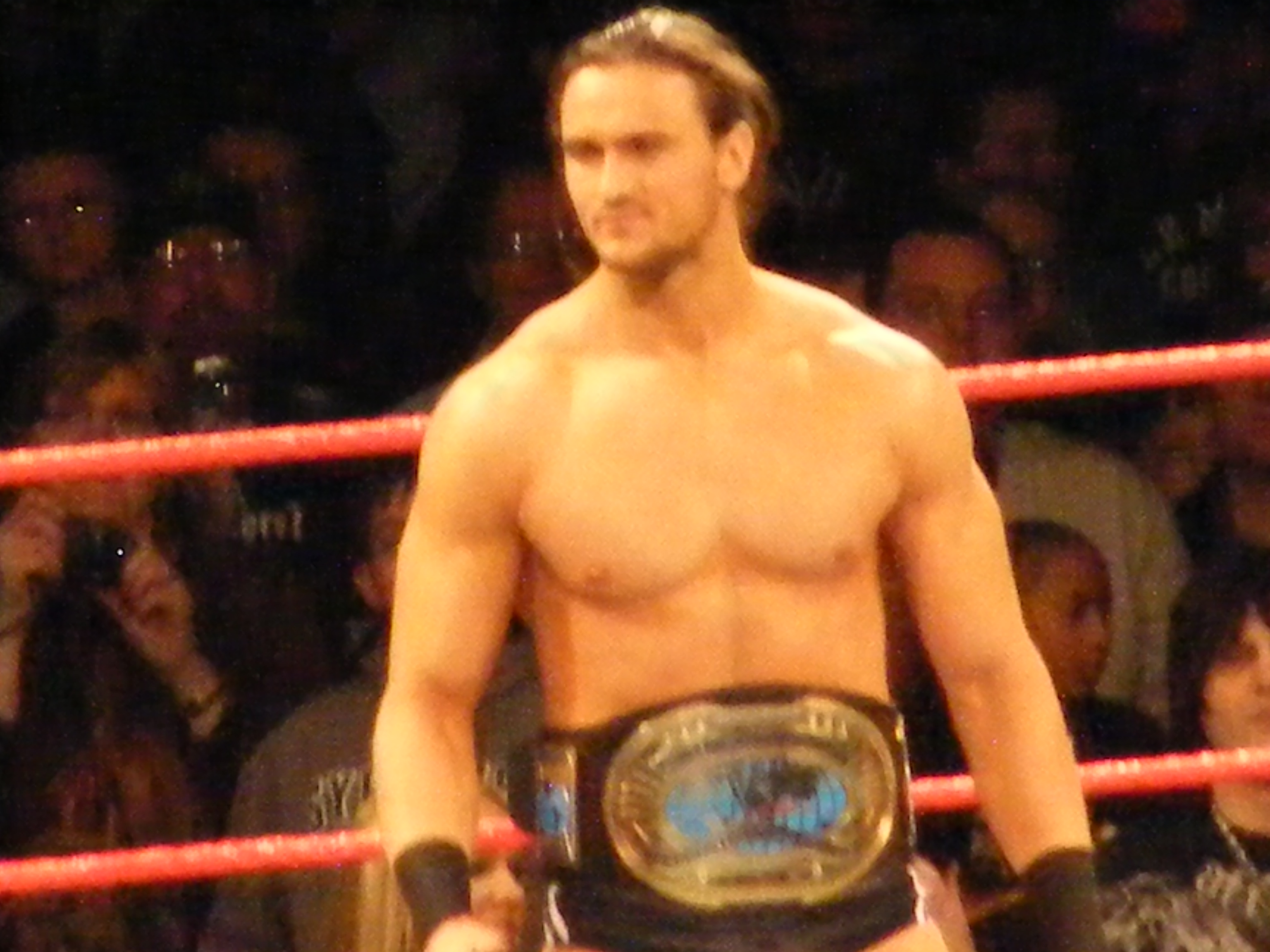
SmackDown's Intercontinental Champion Drew McIntyre, who defended the title against Kofi Kingston at Over the Limit.

Another feud was over the WWE Intercontinental Championship between the defending champion Drew McIntyre and Kofi Kingston. SmackDown General Manager Theodore Long stripped McIntyre of the championship and fired him for repeatedly attacking Matt Hardy. Long set up a tournament to determine the new champion, in which Christian and Kingston qualified for the final by defeating Cody Rhodes and Dolph Ziggler. The following week, on the May 14 episode of SmackDown, Kingston defeated Christian to win the tournament and the championship. Immediately following the match, however, McIntyre presented Long with a letter from WWE Chairman Vince McMahon, which stated that McIntyre had been reinstated to the roster and was still recognized as the Intercontinental Champion. As a result, WWE's official website announced that McIntyre would defend the championship against tournament winner Kingston.

The team of Chris Jericho and The Miz had begun feuding with The Hart Dynasty (Tyson Kidd and David Hart Smith) over the Unified WWE Tag Team Championship. The Miz's feud with The Hart Dynasty had begun while The Miz was one-half of the Unified Tag Team Champions with The Big Show. During the Draft episode of Raw, The Hart Dynasty defeated ShoMiz to win the championship, which led to Big Show turning on The Miz. The following week, The Miz and Jericho, another former tag team partner of Big Show, teamed up to attack The Hart Dynasty. Jericho went on to defeat Smith to earn a championship match for himself and The Miz at Over the Limit.

After WrestleMania XXVI, Ted DiBiase had debuted a new gimmick of an arrogant millionaire, similar to his father (Ted DiBiase, Sr.)'s old gimmick. On the April 5 episode of Raw, DiBiase was given possession of the Million Dollar Championship and access to a trust fund by his father. DiBiase then began looking for a "Virgil", a manservant like his father used to have. He offered the position to R-Truth, who refused, leading to a feud between the two. After losing a match to John Morrison, DiBiase attacked him, prompting R-Truth to interfere and save Morrison. In retaliation, DiBiase paid The Colóns to attack R-Truth the following week.

In the only women's match scheduled on the card, Eve defended the WWE Divas Championship against the former champion, Maryse. Eve had won the championship on the April 12 episode of Raw, and in the weeks that followed she was attacked by Maryse, who was attempting to get revenge.

== Event ==
Other on-screen personnel
Role:	Name:
English commentators	Michael Cole (Raw)
English commentators	Jerry Lawler (Raw)
English commentators	Matt Striker (SmackDown)
Spanish commentators	Carlos Cabrera
Spanish commentators	Hugo Savinovich
Ring announcers	Tony Chimel (SmackDown)
Ring announcers	Justin Roberts (Raw)
Backstage interviewer	Josh Mathews
Referees	Mike Chioda
Referees	Charles Robinson
Referees	John Cone
Referees	Jack Doan

Prior to the pay-per-view, Montel Vontavious Porter defeated Chavo Guerrero in a dark match.

=== Preliminary matches ===
The first match that was aired as part of the pay-per-view was Drew McIntyre defending his Intercontinental Championship against Kofi Kingston. Kingston took the early advantage, by performing a suicide dive to the outside of the ring on McIntyre. McIntyre threw Kingston in the ringpost, and went on the offense. Kingston was able to counter McIntyre's "Future Shock" DDT, and perform his finishing move, the S.O.S, to pin McIntyre for the victory and the championship. Following the match, McIntyre demanded that Teddy Long go out to the ring and reverse the decision, but instead McIntyre was attacked by Matt Hardy, who McIntyre had attacked on several occasions in the prior weeks.

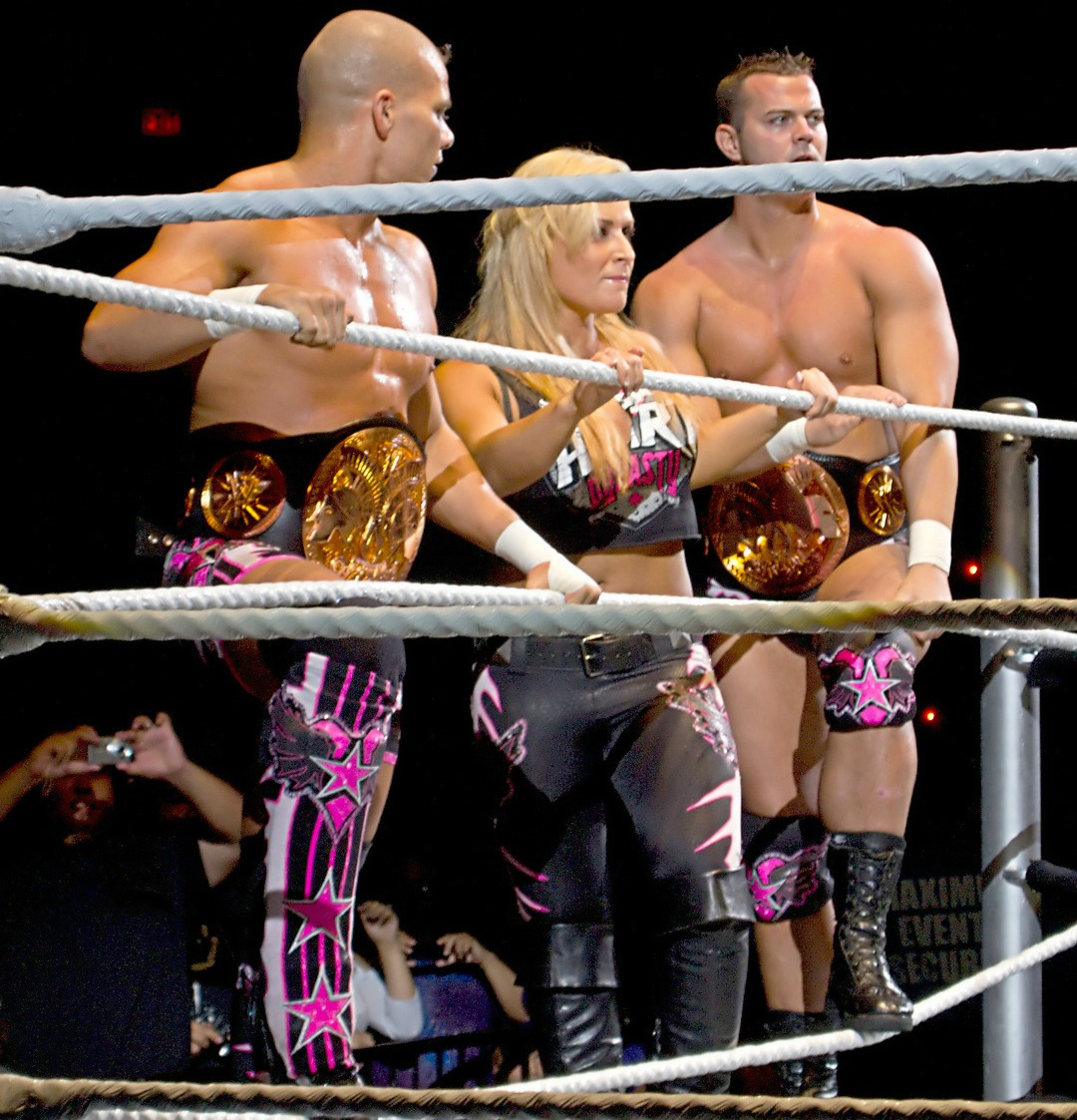
Unified WWE Tag Team Champions The Hart Dynasty (Tyson Kidd and David Hart Smith), shown with Natalya, faced Chris Jericho and The Miz.

The next match was a singles match between Ted DiBiase, who was accompanied by Virgil, and R-Truth. In the early stages of the match, Virgil caused a distraction, allowing DiBiase to take the advantage by performing a reverse neckbreaker and throwing R-Truth into the barricade at ringside. R-Truth was able to counter a move from the top rope, and went on to win the match by utilising his "Lie Detector" finishing move (a corkscrew flying forearm smash).

The third match on the card was a Straight Edge Society pledge vs. hair match, between CM Punk and Rey Mysterio. For this match, the other Straight Edge Society members (Serena and Luke Gallows) were banned from ringside. Early on in the match, Punk threw Mysterio headfirst out of the ring into the barber chair at ringside. Punk had suffered a cut to the head prior to the exchange, and while Mysterio was on the floor, the match was halted so that the blood could be cleaned up. While Punk's wound was being attended, he dropkicked Mysterio, who was on the ring apron, and began attacking him on the floor to restart the match. After Mysterio missed a splash from the top rope, Punk went to pin him, but Mysterio was able to perform a crucifix cradle on Punk for the victory. The other Straight Edge Society members attacked Mysterio after the match, but he was saved by Kane, which allowed Mysterio to handcuff Punk to the ring ropes and shave his head.

A tag team match for the Unified WWE Tag Team Championship followed, between the champions The Hart Dynasty (Tyson Kidd and David Hart Smith), who were accompanied by their manager Natalya, and the team of Chris Jericho and The Miz. The Hart Dynasty took the early advantage, but Jericho and The Miz were able to isolate both Smith and Kidd in the ring at different points in the match, wearing them down. Natalya interfered by tripping up Jericho while The Miz had the referee distracted. The Hart Dynasty were able to capitalise, and performed the Hart Attack on The Miz for the pinfall victory.

The fifth match was between Edge and Randy Orton. Edge took early control of the match by driving Orton into the barricade outside the ring. Orton was able to recover, and performed a rope hung DDT on Edge. While setting up for his finishing move, the RKO, Orton appeared to injure his arm, and went outside the ring in an attempt to recover. Edge followed him, trying to perform the spear, but Orton was able to avoid it, and Edge hit the barricade. Neither man was able to return to the ring before the count of ten, and as a result, the match ended in a double countout.

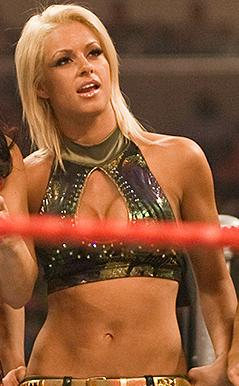
Maryse was unsuccessful in regaining Raw's Divas Championship.

The first major match of the night was between Jack Swagger and Big Show for the World Heavyweight Championship. Big Show dominated the match, with Swagger getting very little offense. As a result, Swagger got frustrated and hit Big Show with the World Heavyweight Championship title belt, and was disqualified. After the match, Swagger attacked Big Show with a steel chair, but Big Show was able to stop him with a chokeslam. Big Show then performed his knockout punch on Swagger, before leaving the area.

The penultimate match on the card saw Eve defend the WWE Divas Championship against Maryse. Maryse took the early advantage, but when she threw Eve outside the ring, and attempted to kick her, she kicked the ringpost instead, allowing Eve to take control with a series of dropkicks. Eve performed a standing moonsault and a sunset flip for a near-fall. Maryse countered a rolling senton splash attempt by Eve and went for her finishing move, the French Kiss; that was countered by Eve for the pin, who retained her championship.

=== Main event ===
The main event was John Cena versus Batista for the WWE Championship in an "I Quit" match, where the object of the match is to force an opponent to say "I Quit". As the bell rang to signal the start of the match Batista gave Cena the chance to quit immediately, but Cena refused and hit Batista with the microphone. Despite this, Batista was able to take control, and locked in a submission hold, but Cena refused to say "I quit". Cena eventually countered the move into his own submission hold, the STF, and Batista passed out. As he had not said the words "I Quit" however, he had to be revived so the match could continue. Batista fought back, and was able to powerslam Cena through the announce table. As Cena was bleeding, the match was briefly halted so his wound could receive attention. The two fought into the crowd before ending up near the entrance ramp, with Batista hitting Cena with a steel chair. On the entrance stage, Batista got into a car, which had been placed on the stage for decoration, and attempted to run over Cena. Cena avoided it, and was able to pull Batista out of the car and slam him onto it. Cena performed his Attitude Adjustment on Batista onto the car, but when Batista refused to quit, Cena went for the move again. When it became clear that Cena was going to hit the Attitude Adjustment from off the car and onto the stage, Batista quit, making Cena the winner, but Cena performed the Attitude Adjustment again anyway, sending Batista through the stage to the floor. As Cena was celebrating retaining the championship, he was attacked by Sheamus to end the show.

== Reception ==
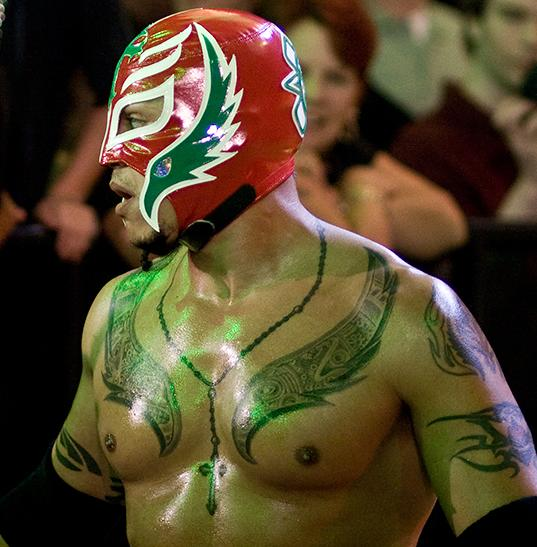
Rey Mysterio's match with CM Punk was highly praised.

The event received generally negative reviews. Writing for Canadian Online Explorer's wrestling section, Matt Bishop derided the show, calling it "one of the worst WWE pay-per-view events in a long time" and awarded the show 5.5 out of ten.

Most of the negative comments centered around the following World Heavyweight Championship match, which ended in disqualification immediately following a double countout in the preceding Orton-Edge match due to injury. Bishop awarded the match 2.5 out of ten and said that the match "hurt the show in a big, big way". Kevin Eck of The Baltimore Sun also criticized the booking of the finish, remarking that "Swagger came off looking like anything but a credible champion". Wrestling journalist Dave Meltzer also criticized the World Heavyweight Championship match, remarking that it was "almost an insult as a PPV main event". Bishop stated that the show was "hampered by several stoppages for blood" and a predictable ending to the main event between Cena and Batista.

Despite the generally negative reviews, the Mysterio-Punk match was highly praised. Bishop awarded the match 8.5 out of ten, and stated it was one of two matches, along with the Tag Team Championship bout, that were not "underwhelming in every aspect". Eck agreed, calling the Punk-Mysterio match the "most compelling match on the card" and stated that the Tag Team Championship match was "well-worked".

11,000 people attended Over the Limit at the Joe Louis Arena in Detroit, resulting in a gate of approximately $675,000. In August 2010, WWE reported that the event had received 197,000 pay-per-view buys. The DVD of the event contained extras including a match between Bret Hart and The Miz for the WWE United States Championship and several promos from the weeks preceding the event.

== Aftermath ==
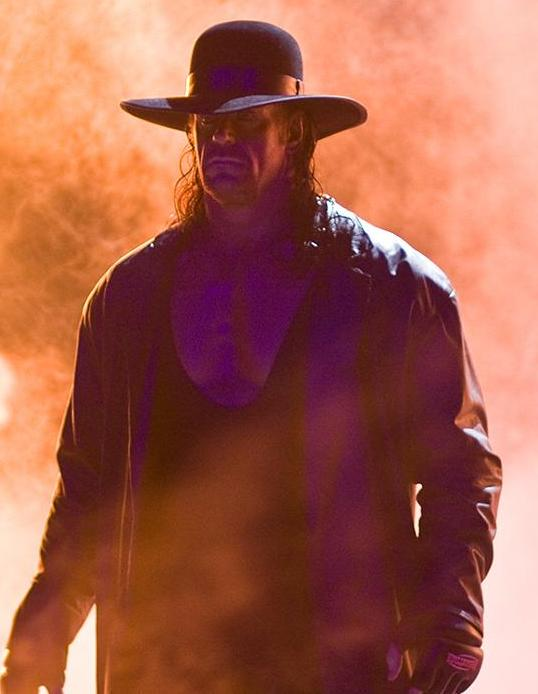
The Undertaker qualified for SmackDown's World Heavyweight Championship fatal four-way match at Fatal 4-Way but was injured and replaced by Rey Mysterio before the event.

During the event, five wrestlers suffered legitimate injuries. Randy Orton dislocated his shoulder while Ted DiBiase suffered a concussion, and although they both appeared on Raw the following night, they did not wrestle. CM Punk required 13 staples to close the wound in his forehead he sustained during his match with Mysterio. Batista suffered a back and tailbone injury during his match with John Cena, who himself suffered a laceration and lost a tooth.

On the episode of Raw following Over the Limit, Bret Hart was announced as the new Raw General Manager. During Batista's promo at the beginning of the show, Hart interrupted and told him that if he wanted a rematch against Cena, he would have to qualify for the fatal four-way match at the Fatal 4-Way pay-per-view in June. Batista refused to wrestle, citing his injuries, and as a result Hart awarded the match to his opponent Orton by forfeit. Following Hart's decision, Batista quit WWE. This storyline was put in place as Batista was legitimately leaving WWE to pursue acting and a career in mixed martial arts.

Apart from Orton qualifying via forfeit, the other qualifying matches for the WWE Championship fatal four-way match saw Sheamus defeat Mark Henry and Edge defeat Jericho and Cena in a triple threat match.

On the May 28 episode of SmackDown, SmackDown General Manager Teddy Long announced a fatal four-way match for the World Heavyweight Championship would be taking place at the Fatal 4-Way pay-per-view. As the defending champion Jack Swagger automatically was part of the match, and as a result of his win by disqualification, Big Show received automatic entry. Later in the show, both The Undertaker and CM Punk qualified for the match as well, by defeating Rey Mysterio and Kane respectively. During his qualification match against Kane, Punk wore a mask to the ring in order to hide his newly-shaven head. During his match with Mysterio, The Undertaker suffered a concussion, broken orbital bone and broken nose and the following week, was deemed unable to participate in the match. WWE replaced him in the match by devising a storyline in which The Undertaker was found in a "vegetative state" by his on-screen half brother Kane on the following episode of SmackDown. That same broadcast, a battle royal to decide who would replace The Undertaker at the Fatal 4-Way pay-per-view was won by Rey Mysterio.

At the beginning of the May 28 episode of SmackDown, Drew McIntyre made Teddy Long read out a letter from WWE Chairman Vince McMahon, which stated that as a result of attacking McIntyre at Over the Limit, Matt Hardy had been suspended without pay until further notice. On the same episode, McIntyre simultaneously continued his feud with Kofi Kingston by teaming with Jack Swagger in a loss to Kingston and The Big Show.

A second Over the Limit was held the following year, thus establishing the event as WWE's annual May PPV. Additionally, in April 2011, WWE ceased using its full name with the "WWE" abbreviation becoming an orphaned initialism. This was the only Over the Limit held before the original World Tag Team Championship was deactivated in August in favor of the WWE Tag Team Championship, which became available to both brands; since WrestleMania 25 in April 2009, both titles were held and defended together across all brands as the Unified WWE Tag Team Championship. It would also be the only Over the Limit held before the original WWE Women's Championship was deactivated in September in favor of the WWE Divas Championship, which also became available to both brands. Over the Limit would be a short-lived PPV as it was discontinued after its 2012 event and was replaced by Battleground in 2013.

== Results ==
No.	Results	Stipulations	Times
1^{D}	Montel Vontavious Porter defeated Chavo Guerrero by pinfall	Singles match	04:20
2	Kofi Kingston defeated Drew McIntyre (c) by pinfall	Singles match for the WWE Intercontinental Championship	06:24
3	R-Truth defeated Ted DiBiase (with Virgil) by pinfall	Singles match	07:46
4	Rey Mysterio defeated CM Punk by pinfall	Straight Edge Society pledge vs. Hair match The Straight Edge Society were banned from ringside.	13:49
5	The Hart Dynasty (David Hart Smith and Tyson Kidd) (c) (with Natalya) defeated Chris Jericho and The Miz by pinfall	Tag team match for the Unified WWE Tag Team Championship (Note: The name "Unified WWE Tag Team Championship" referred to both the World Tag Team Championship and WWE Tag Team Championship being held and defended together, although both titles remained independently active.)	10:44
6	Edge vs. Randy Orton ended in a double countout	Singles match	12:58
7	The Big Show defeated Jack Swagger (c) by disqualification	Singles match for the World Heavyweight Championship	05:05
8	Eve Torres (c) defeated Maryse by pinfall	Singles match for the WWE Divas Championship	05:03
9	John Cena (c) defeated Batista	"I Quit" match for the WWE Championship	20:33
(c) / – the champion(s) heading into the match; D / – this was a dark match
