= Over the Limit (2012) =

WWE pay-per-view event

- Promotional poster featuring Randy Orton
- Promotion: WWE
- Date: May 20, 2012
- City: Raleigh, North Carolina
- Venue: PNC Arena
- Attendance: 8,000
- Buy rate: 167,000

Pay-per-view chronology
← Previous; Extreme Rules	Next → No Way Out

Over the Limit chronology
← Previous; 2011	Next → Final

The 2012 Over the Limit was a professional wrestling pay-per-view (PPV) event produced by WWE. It was the third annual and final Over the Limit and took place on May 20, 2012, at the PNC Arena in Raleigh, North Carolina. The name "Over the Limit" originally referred to the main event matches of the previous two events being contested as an "I Quit" match; for 2012, the title referred to the main event being a No Disqualification match.

Ten professional wrestling matches took place at the event, nine of which were broadcast live on pay-per-view. In the main event, John Laurinaitis defeated John Cena in a No Disqualification match. Also featured were CM Punk defeating Daniel Bryan to retain the WWE Championship and Sheamus defeating Alberto Del Rio, Randy Orton, and Chris Jericho in a fatal four-way match to retain the World Heavyweight Championship.

The event garnered 167,000 pay-per-view buys, up from 140,000 the previous year's event received. A fourth Over the Limit was planned for October 2013, however, it was instead canceled and replaced by Battleground. This would in turn be the only Over the Limit held following the end of the first brand extension in August 2011.

== Production ==
=== Background ===
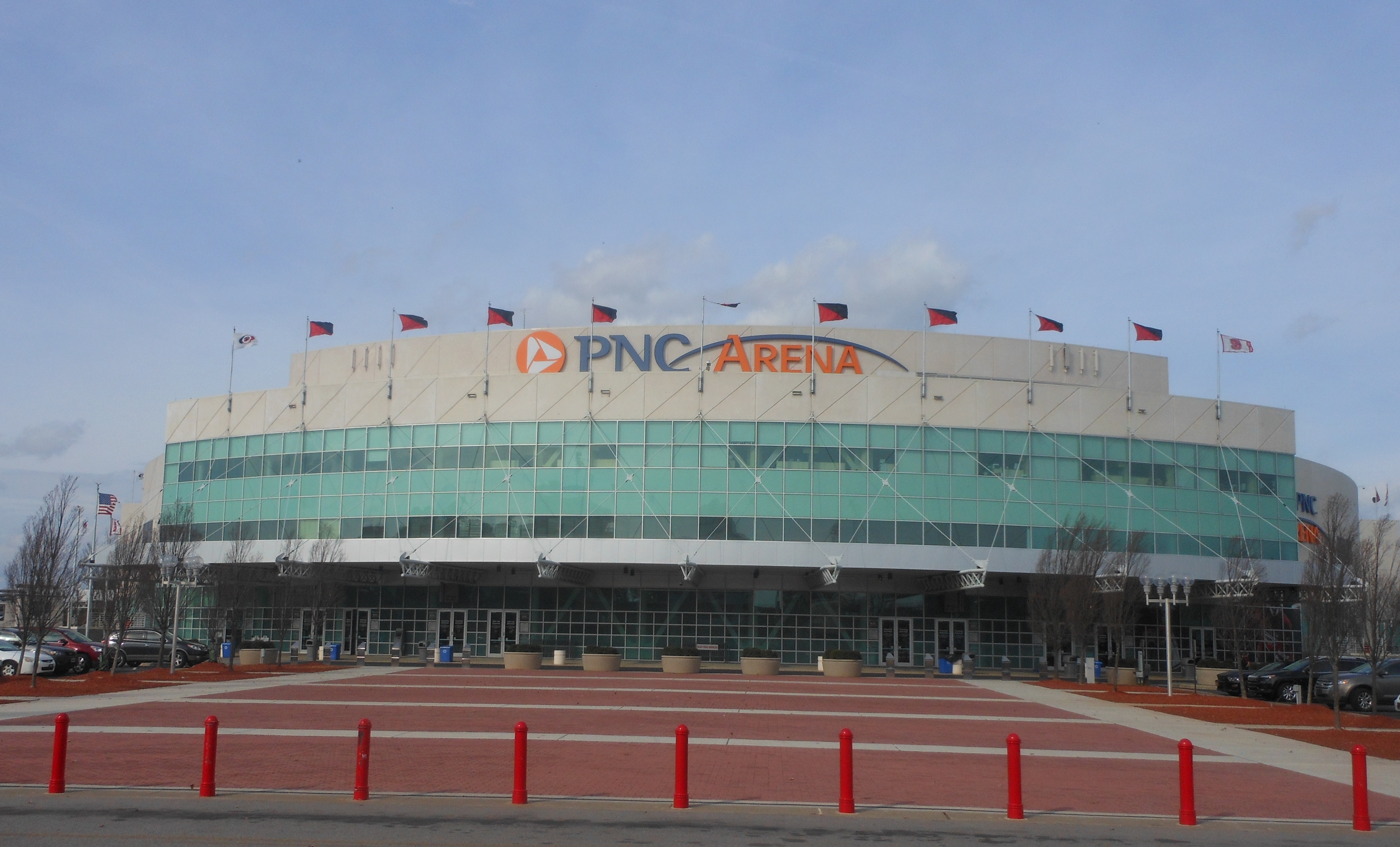
The third annual and final Over the Limit was held at the PNC Arena in Raleigh, North Carolina.

Over the Limit was an annual professional wrestling pay-per-view (PPV) event held every May by WWE since 2010. The event's name was a reference to its main event match being contested as an "I Quit" match. The third event was scheduled for May 20, 2012, at the PNC Arena in Raleigh, North Carolina. Instead of an "I Quit" match, a No Disqualification match was contested as the main event for the 2012 event. This would also be the only Over the Limit to not occur during a brand extension, which had ended in August 2011.

=== Storylines ===
The event included matches that resulted from scripted storylines. Results were predetermined by WWE's writers, while storylines were produced on WWE's weekly television shows, Raw and SmackDown.

The main event feud was between John Cena and the General Manager of Raw and SmackDown, John Laurinaitis. On the night after losing to The Rock in the main event of WrestleMania XXVIII in early April, Cena's promo was interrupted by a returning Brock Lesnar, who immediately attacked him with an F-5. It was revealed the next week on Raw that Laurinaitis hired Lesnar to replace Cena as "the face of the WWE" by taking him out at Extreme Rules. A battered Cena barely managed to defeat Lesnar, and in a post-match promo, emphasized his injuries and announced he would be "taking a vacation". The next night on Raw, Lesnar attacked WWE COO Triple H (while he was arguing with Laurinaitis about the validity of Lesnar's contract), breaking his arm. With Lesnar's WWE job now in jeopardy, and after advice from his Executive Administrator Eve Torres, Laurinaitis decided on Cena's next opponent, for Over the Limit. Later that night, while Cena was in the ring, Laurinaitis appeared on the entrance stage to introduce Lord Tensai. Laurinaitis and Tensai then attacked Cena, and Laurinaitis revealed himself as Cena's opponent. The WWE Board of Directors stipulated the only way to win was via pinfall or submission, and anybody interfering in Laurinaitis' behalf would be immediately fired and, if Laurinaitis lost the match, he would be fired.

Another feud heading into Over the Limit was between WWE Champion CM Punk and Daniel Bryan. Following the Extreme Rules pay-per-view, Eve Torres announced Punk's next challenger would be decided by a series of Beat the Clock matches on the April 30 episode of Raw. In the final match of the evening, Bryan defeated Jerry Lawler in the fastest time to become the #1 contender.

Another storyline led to World Heavyweight Champion Sheamus defending his title in a fatal four-way match against Alberto Del Rio, Randy Orton, and Chris Jericho. Sheamus faced a returning Del Rio in a non-title match on the April 6 episode of SmackDown, where Del Rio defeated Sheamus via disqualification to earn a future title shot. On the May 7 episode of Raw, Sheamus and Orton faced Jericho and Del Rio in a tag team match. Jericho pinned Sheamus to win the match after Sheamus accidentally Brogue Kicked Orton. After the match, Orton gave Sheamus an RKO. Del Rio, Jericho, and Orton then all went into John Laurinaitis' office and demanded title opportunities against Sheamus, leading to a brawl between the three and Sheamus, which was broken up by officials. Laurinaitis then informed Sheamus that he would defend the World Heavyweight Championship against Del Rio, Jericho, and Orton in a fatal-four way match at Over the Limit.

== Event ==
Other on-screen personnel
Role:	Name:
English Commentators	Michael Cole
English Commentators	Jerry Lawler
English Commentators	Booker T
Spanish Commentators	Carlos Cabrera
Spanish Commentators	Marcelo Rodriguez
Backstage interviewer	Josh Mathews
Ring announcers	Lilian Garcia
Ring announcers	Justin Roberts
Referees	Mike Chioda
Referees	Charles Robinson
Referees	John Cone
Referees	Jack Doan
Referees	Scott Armstrong
Referees	Chad Patton

=== Pre-show ===
During the pre-show, Zack Ryder faced Kane. At the end of the match, as Ryder attempted the Rough Ryder on Kane, Kane performed a Chokeslam on Ryder to win the match.

=== Preliminary matches ===
The actual pay-per-view opened with a 20 man Battle Royal for a United States Championship or Intercontinental Championship match. The match came down to The Miz, Tyson Kidd, David Otunga, and Christian. After Miz and Otunga worked together to eliminate Kidd, Christian eliminated Otunga. Christian eliminated Miz to win the match.

Next, Kofi Kingston and R Truth defended the Tag Team Championship against Dolph Ziggler and Jack Swagger. The match ended when Kingston executed Trouble in Paradise on Ziggler to retain the titles.

After that, Layla defended the Divas Championship against Beth Phoenix. Layla executed a Neckbreaker on Phoenix to retain the title.

In the fourth match, Sheamus defended the World Heavyweight Championship against Chris Jericho, Randy Orton, and Alberto Del Rio (accompanied by Ricardo Rodriguez) in a fatal four-way match. The match came to an end when Sheamus executed White Noise on Jericho to retain the title.

Later, The Miz faced Brodus Clay (accompanied by his background dancers, Cameron and Naomi) in an impromptu match. Miz cut a promo in the ring where he vented out his frustrations to WWE management before Clay came out. Clay executed a Running Splash on Miz to win the match.

In the sixth match, Cody Rhodes defended the Intercontinental Championship against Christian. Christian executed a Killswitch on Rhodes to win the title for a fourth time.

Next, CM Punk defended the WWE Championship against Daniel Bryan. In the end, Bryan applied the Yes Lock on Punk, but Punk managed to pin Bryan to retain the title despite submitting as the pinfall was counted.

In the penultimate match, Ryback faced Camacho (accompanied by Hunico). Ryback dominated Camacho throughout the match. In the end, Ryback delivered a Shell Shocked to Camacho to win the match.

=== Main event ===
In the main event, John Cena faced Raw and SmackDown General Manager John Laurinaitis in a No Disqualification match where, if Laurinaitis lost, he would be fired. An added stipulation was that any WWE employee who interfered would also be fired. Though Cena dominated Laurinaitis for most of the match and performed various humiliating acts on him (such as spraying him with a fire extinguisher and pouring water down his pants), Laurinaitis ultimately won after Big Show, who he had previously been fired for mocking his voice, came into the ring and teased attacking Laurinaitis before turning heel by incapacitating Cena with a WMD (Weapon of Mass Destruction), allowing Laurinaitis to pin him and keep his job.

== Aftermath ==
The 2012 Over the Limit was the final Over the Limit held. As Extreme Rules took the May 2013 PPV slot, Over the Limit was going to be held in October, but it was instead canceled and replaced by Battleground.

== Results ==
No.	Results	Stipulations	Times
1^{P}	Kane defeated Zack Ryder by pinfall	Singles match	7:00
2	Christian won by last eliminating The Miz	20-man Battle Royal; The winner got a choice of a United States or Intercontinental Championship match.	12:24
3	Kofi Kingston and R-Truth (c) defeated Dolph Ziggler and Jack Swagger (with Vickie Guerrero) by pinfall	Tag team match for the WWE Tag Team Championship	12:17
4	Layla (c) defeated Beth Phoenix by pinfall	Singles match for the WWE Divas Championship	7:50
5	Sheamus (c) defeated Alberto Del Rio (with Ricardo Rodriguez), Chris Jericho, and Randy Orton by pinfall	Fatal four-way match for the World Heavyweight Championship	15:54
6	Brodus Clay (with Cameron and Naomi) defeated The Miz by pinfall	Singles match	4:12
7	Christian defeated Cody Rhodes (c) by pinfall	Singles match for the WWE Intercontinental Championship	7:25
8	CM Punk (c) defeated Daniel Bryan by pinfall	Singles match for the WWE Championship	24:14
9	Ryback defeated Camacho (with Hunico) by pinfall	Singles match	1:50
10	John Laurinaitis defeated John Cena by pinfall	No Disqualification match Had Cena won, Laurinaitis would have been fired, and anyone who interfered would have been fired.	17:02
(c) / – the champion(s) heading into the match; P / – the match was broadcast on the pre-show

=== Battle Royal ===
Elimination	Wrestler	Eliminated by	Times
1	Heath Slater	The Great Khali	1:27
2	Michael McGillicutty	The Great Khali	1:40
3	JTG	The Usos	2:02
4	Yoshi Tatsu	Drew McIntyre	2:18
5	Ezekiel Jackson	Curt Hawkins and Tyler Reks	2:30
6	Jey Uso	Darren Young	3:07
7	Drew McIntyre	Curt Hawkins and Tyler Reks	3:40
8	Curt Hawkins	The Great Khali	3:56
9	Tyler Reks	The Great Khali	3:57
10	Jinder Mahal	The Great Khali	4:08
11	The Great Khali	Darren Young, The Miz, and Titus O'Neil	5:21
12	Titus O'Neil	Jimmy Uso	6:03
13	Jimmy Uso	Darren Young	6:40
14	William Regal	Christian	7:17
15	Darren Young	Alex Riley	7:48
16	Alex Riley	The Miz	8:30
17	Tyson Kidd	David Otunga	9:32
18	David Otunga	Christian	11:29
19	The Miz	Christian	12:24
Winner:	Christian		12:24
