= Battleground (2014) =

WWE pay-per-view and livestreaming event

- Promotional poster featuring Bray Wyatt
- Promotion: WWE
- Date: July 20, 2014
- City: Tampa, Florida
- Venue: Tampa Bay Times Forum
- Attendance: 12,000
- Buy rate: 99,000 (excluding WWE Network views)

WWE event chronology
← Previous; Money in the Bank	Next → SummerSlam

Battleground chronology
← Previous; 2013	Next → 2015

The 2014 Battleground was a professional wrestling pay-per-view (PPV) and livestreaming event produced by WWE. It was the second annual Battleground and took place on July 20, 2014, at the Tampa Bay Times Forum in Tampa, Florida. The inaugural 2013 event was held in October as Battleground was originally intended to be an annual October event before it was moved up to July for 2014.

Nine matches were contested at the event, including two on the Kickoff pre-show. The main event saw John Cena defeat Randy Orton, Kane, and Roman Reigns in a fatal four-way match to retain the WWE World Heavyweight Championship. In another prominent match, AJ Lee defeated Paige to retain the WWE Divas Championship.

This was the first Battleground event to livestream on the WWE Network, which launched in February. The event received 99,000 pay-per-view buys (excluding WWE Network views), slightly down on the previous year's 114,000 buys. This was WWE's last PPV and livestreaming event to incorporate the WWE scratch logo, as the following month, WWE rebranded and began using the logo that was originally used for the WWE Network.

== Production ==
=== Background ===
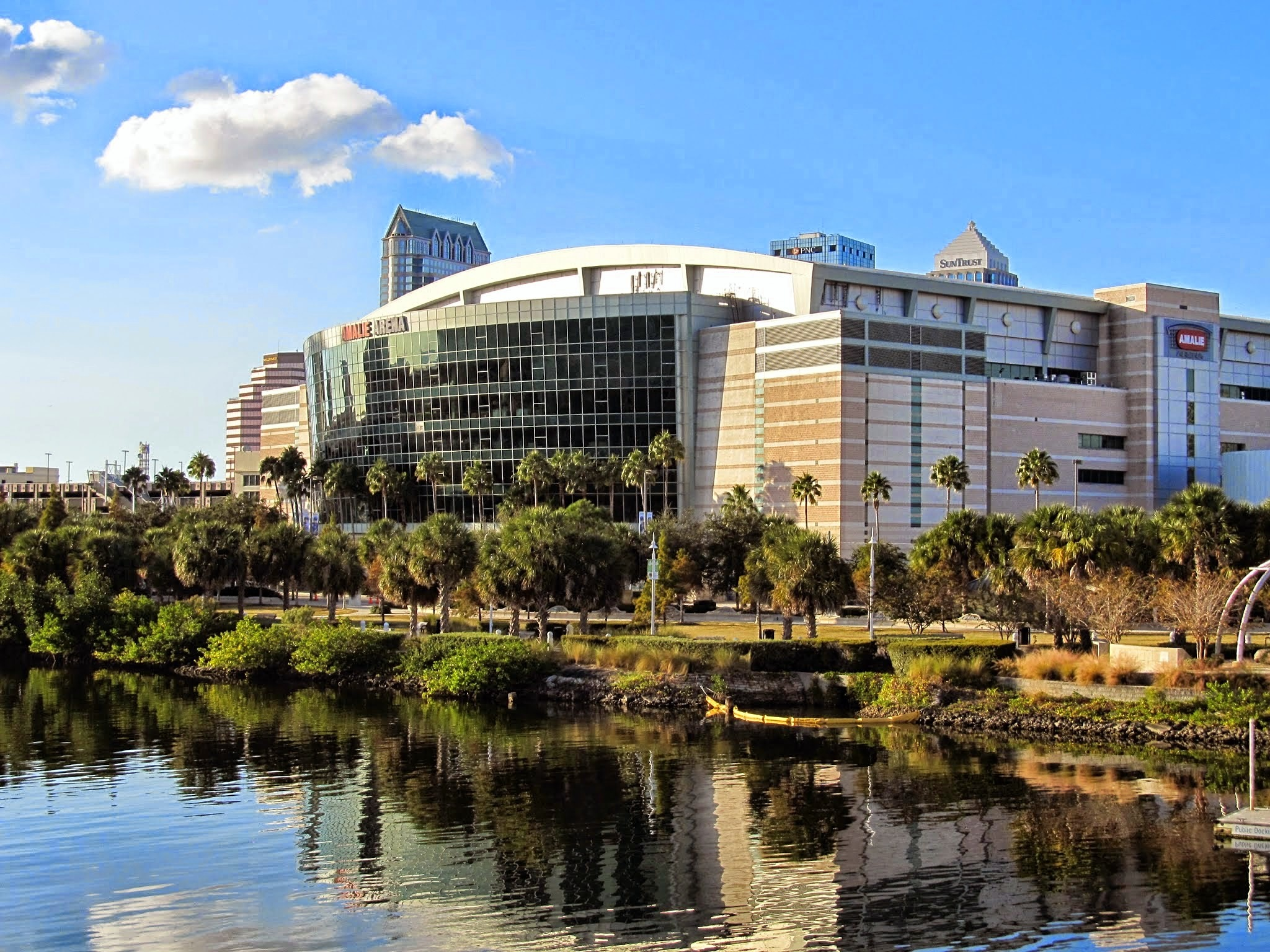
The second annual Battleground was held at the Tampa Bay Times Forum in Tampa, Florida.

On October 6, 2013, WWE held a professional wrestling pay-per-view (PPV) event titled Battleground that replaced Over the Limit, and it was originally intended to be an annual October event for the promotion. The following year, a second Battleground was announced, but it was moved up to July, scheduled for July 20, 2014, at the Tampa Bay Times Forum in Tampa, Florida. This second event in turn established Battleground as WWE's annual July event. In addition to PPV, this was the first Battleground to livestream on the WWE Network, which launched earlier in February.

=== Storylines ===
The event comprised nine matches, including two on the Kickoff pre-show, that resulted from scripted storylines. Results were predetermined by WWE's writers, while storylines were produced on WWE's weekly television shows, Raw and SmackDown.

At Money in the Bank, John Cena won a ladder match for the vacant WWE World Heavyweight Championship to become a 15-time WWE world champion. The next night on Raw, Triple H scheduled Cena to defend the title at Battleground in a fatal four-way match against Roman Reigns, Kane, and Randy Orton.

On the June 30 episode of Raw, AJ Lee returned to WWE (her last appearance was the Raw after WrestleMania XXX) and defeated Paige for the Divas Championship for a second time. On the July 11 episode of Smackdown, AJ was scheduled to defend the title against Paige at the event.

On the June 30 episode of Raw, it was revealed that WWE Intercontinental Champion Bad News Barrett suffered an injury on the June 27 episode of SmackDown when he was thrown into the barricade by Jack Swagger. Due to this, he was stripped of the championship. Michael Cole also announced that there would be a Battleground Battle Royal at Battleground for the vacant WWE Intercontinental Championship. On the same episode, Cesaro, The Great Khali, Kofi Kingston, and Damien Sandow were added to the battle royal. On the July 1 episode of Main Event, Dolph Ziggler, Rob Van Dam, Ryback, Curtis Axel, and Big E were added to the match. On the July 4 episode of SmackDown, Alberto Del Rio and Bo Dallas were added to the match. On the July 7 episode of Raw, Fandango and Sheamus were added to the match. On the July 14 episode of Raw, Sin Cara, The Miz, Titus O'Neil, Xavier Woods, Zack Ryder, Heath Slater, R-Truth, Adam Rose, and Diego were added to the match.

At Battleground, it was announced that Bad News Barrett was to award the Intercontinental Championship to the winner of the battle royal. On July 16, Sandow and Rose were pulled from the battle royal. On July 20, Sandow was reinstated into the battle royal and Fandango was pulled from the battle royal. Van Dam did not appear in the battle royal due to an injury.

On the June 30 episode of Raw, Chris Jericho returned to WWE only for The Wyatt Family (Bray Wyatt, Luke Harper, and Erick Rowan), thus setting up a match between Wyatt and Jericho at the event.

Following Money in the Bank, WWE Tag Team Champions The Usos (Jey Uso and Jimmy Uso) continued their feud with Wyatt Family members Luke Harper and Erick Rowan. On the June 30 episode of Raw, The Wyatt Family (Harper, Rowan, and Bray Wyatt) defeated The Usos and Sheamus. On the July 7 episode of Raw, Harper and Rowan defeated The Usos. On the July 11 episode of SmackDown, The Usos were scheduled to defend the titles against The Wyatt Family in a two out of three falls match at the event.

On the June 2 episode of Raw, Seth Rollins turned on The Shield by attacking both Dean Ambrose and Roman Reigns, siding with The Authority in the process. In the ensuing weeks, Rollins and Ambrose attacked each other, and each interfered in the others matches. The feud intensified when Kane assisted Rollins in winning the Money in the Bank ladder match at the Money in the Bank pay-per-view on June 29. On July 12, it was announced that Rollins and Ambrose were scheduled to face each other at Battleground.

On the June 30 episode of Raw, Jack Swagger and Zeb Colter confronted Rusev and Lana about their anti-American views. Swagger and Colter issued a challenge to Rusev, which was accepted on the July 14 episode of Raw.

Also confirmed for the event was Cameron squaring off against Naomi, which took place on the Kickoff pre-show. After they lost to AJ Lee and Paige on the July 7 episode of Raw, Cameron and Naomi attacked each other, effectively breaking up The Funkadactyls and setting up a match for the event.

On July 20, a match between Adam Rose and Fandango was scheduled for the Kickoff pre-show.

== Event ==
Other on-screen personnel
Role:	Name:
English commentators	Michael Cole
English commentators	Jerry Lawler
English commentators	John "Bradshaw" Layfield
Spanish commentators	Carlos Cabrera
Spanish commentators	Marcelo Rodriguez
Backstage interviewer	Tom Phillips
Ring announcers	Lilian Garcia
Ring announcers	Justin Roberts
Referees	Mike Chioda
Referees	Charles Robinson
Referees	John Cone
Referees	Jason Ayers
Referees	Darrick Moore
Referees	Matt Bennett
Referees	Ryan Tran
Referees	Rod Zapata
Pre-show panel	Renee Young
Pre-show panel	Booker T
Pre-show panel	Christian
Pre-show panel	Alex Riley

=== Pre-show ===
During the Battleground Kickoff pre-show, Adam Rose took on Fandango. Rose performed a Party Foul on Fandango to win the match.

In the second pre-show match, Cameron took on Naomi. In the end, Cameron rolled up Naomi to win the match.

=== Preliminary matches ===
The actual pay-per-view opened with The Usos (Jey Uso and Jimmy Uso) defending the WWE Tag Team Championship against Luke Harper and Erick Rowan of The Wyatt Family in a two out of three falls match. Harper and Rowan won the first fall after Harper executed a Big Boot on Jey. The Usos won the second fall after Jey pinned Harper with a roll-up. The Usos won the third fall after performing a double Samoan Splash on Harper, meaning The Usos retained the titles.

Next, AJ Lee defended the WWE Divas Championship against Paige. In the climax, AJ applied the black widow, which Paige countered and then performed a Paige Turner on AJ for a two count. Paige attempted the PTO, but AJ and Paige traded covers. AJ performed a Shining Wizard on Paige to retain the title.

After that, Rusev faced Jack Swagger. The ending saw Swagger apply the Patriot Lock on Rusev outside the ring but Rusev escaped the hold by pulling Swagger into the ring post and Swagger was counted out. After the match, Rusev applied The Accolade on Swagger.

Next, Dean Ambrose was scheduled to face Seth Rollins, but Ambrose was ejected from the arena by Triple H for fighting with Rollins backstage. Rollins subsequently had himself declared the winner by forfeit. Later, as Rollins was leaving the arena, he was attacked by Ambrose but managed to escape.

In the fourth match, Bray Wyatt faced Chris Jericho. During the match, Luke Harper and Erick Rowan were ejected from ringside after attempting to attack Jericho. The match ended when Jericho performed a Codebreaker on Wyatt to win the match.

In the penultimate match, the battle royal for the vacated WWE Intercontinental Championship was contested. In the end, Dolph Ziggler performed a Superkick on Sheamus to eliminate him but The Miz, who had been hiding outside the ring, eliminated Ziggler to win the title.

=== Main event ===
In the main event, John Cena defended the WWE World Heavyweight Championship against Randy Orton, Roman Reigns, and Kane in a fatal four-way match. During the match, Cena applied the STF on Orton but Reigns broke the hold. Reigns performed a Spear on Cena but Kane broke the pinfall. Reigns performed a Spear on Orton through the barricade. Reigns performed a Spear on Kane but Cena broke up the pinfall. Cena performed an Attitude Adjustment on Reigns but Kane broke up the pinfall. Kane performed a Chokeslam on Cena and a Chokeslam on Reigns for a near-fall. Reigns performed a Spear on Kane but received an RKO from Orton. Cena performed an Attitude Adjustment on Orton onto Kane and pinned Kane to retain the title.

== Aftermath ==
The Jack Swagger vs. Rusev match, promoted as "United States vs. Russia", was mired in controversy after Lana made comments prior to the match blaming the United States for "recent current" world events and praising Russian president Vladimir Putin to help build heat for Rusev. Some in the media viewed the promo as a veiled reference to the crash of Malaysia Airlines Flight 17 three days earlier. In response to the backlash, a representative of WWE said that the segment "was in no way referring to the Malaysia Airlines tragedy", adding that the Rusev-Lana storyline "has been a part of WWE programming for more than three months. WWE apologizes to anyone who misunderstood last night's segment and was offended." In response to WWE's statement, Pro Wrestling Torch newsletter assistant editor James Caldwell viewed the comments as hollow, noting that reasonable viewers could conclude that Lana was referring to the plane crash. "WWE tacking on a fake apology with an insult to people's intelligence makes WWE sound even worse. All-around, it's a messy statement that conveys a lack of understanding, sensitivity, and maturity from WWE to be a decent corporate citizen", wrote Caldwell. Swagger did not appear on Raw the next night, but he had a rematch with Rusev on Main Event, which Swagger won by disqualification.

On the July 21 episode of Raw, Triple H named Brock Lesnar the number one contender for the WWE World Heavyweight Championship held by John Cena, and scheduled a title match between them at SummerSlam.

The 2014 Battleground would also be WWE's final PPV and livestreaming event to incorporate the WWE scratch logo, as the following month, WWE rebranded and began using the logo that was originally used for the WWE Network.

== Results ==
No.	Results	Stipulations	Times
1^{P}	Adam Rose (with Layla and Summer Rae) defeated Fandango by pinfall	Singles match	01:20
2^{P}	Cameron defeated Naomi by pinfall	Singles match	03:30
3	The Usos (Jey Uso and Jimmy Uso) (c) defeated The Wyatt Family (Erick Rowan and Luke Harper) 2–1	Two out of three falls match for the WWE Tag Team Championship	18:57
4	AJ Lee (c) defeated Paige by pinfall	Singles match for the WWE Divas Championship	07:13
5	Rusev (with Lana) defeated Jack Swagger (with Zeb Colter) by countout	Singles match	09:54
6	Seth Rollins defeated Dean Ambrose by forfeit	Singles match	—
7	Chris Jericho defeated Bray Wyatt by pinfall	Singles match	15:03
8	The Miz won by last eliminating Dolph Ziggler (Note: Order of elimination: Xavier Woods, Zack Ryder, The Great Khali, Sin Cara, R-Truth, Curtis Axel, Damien Sandow, Diego, Ryback, Titus O'Neil, Alberto Del Rio, Big E, Kofi Kingston, Cesaro, Heath Slater, Bo Dallas, Sheamus and Dolph Ziggler.)	Battle Royal for the vacant WWE Intercontinental Championship	14:05
9	John Cena (c) defeated Kane, Randy Orton, and Roman Reigns by pinfall	Fatal four-way match for the WWE World Heavyweight Championship	18:16
(c) / – the champion(s) heading into the match; P / – the match was broadcast on the pre-show
