= Over the Limit =

Over the Limit may refer to

- WWE Over the Limit, a professional wrestling pay-per-view event
- Over the Limit, album by Trout Fishing in America (band)
