= Over the Limit (2011) =

WWE pay-per-view event

- Promotional poster featuring The Miz and Daniel Bryan wrestling at Night of Champions in 2010
- Promotion: WWE
- Brand(s): Raw; SmackDown
- Date: May 22, 2011
- City: Seattle, Washington
- Venue: KeyArena
- Attendance: 7,500
- Buy rate: 140,000

Pay-per-view chronology
← Previous; Extreme Rules	Next → Capitol Punishment

Over the Limit chronology
← Previous; 2010	Next → 2012

The 2011 Over the Limit was a professional wrestling pay-per-view (PPV) event produced by WWE. It was the second annual Over the Limit and took place on May 22, 2011, at the KeyArena in Seattle, Washington, held for wrestlers from the promotion's Raw and SmackDown brand divisions. The name "Over the Limit" was a reference to its main event match being contested as an "I Quit" match.

Nine matches took place during the event, eight of which were broadcast live on pay-per-view. In the main event, John Cena retained Raw's WWE Championship by defeating The Miz in an "I Quit" match. Elsewhere on the card, Wade Barrett retained SmackDown's Intercontinental Championship against Ezekiel Jackson, Big Show and Kane retained the WWE Tag Team Championship against The New Nexus (CM Punk and Mason Ryan), Brie Bella retained the WWE Divas Championship against Kelly Kelly, and Randy Orton retained SmackDown's World Heavyweight Championship against Christian.

Over the Limit received 140,000 pay-per-view buys worldwide, significantly down from the 2010 edition's 197,000 buys. This was the final Over the Limit held during the first brand extension, which ended in August. This was also the first Over the Limit held to be promoted under the company's shortened trade name of WWE, as following WrestleMania XXVII the previous month, the company ceased using its full name of World Wrestling Entertainment, although that remains the legal name of the company.

== Production ==
=== Background ===
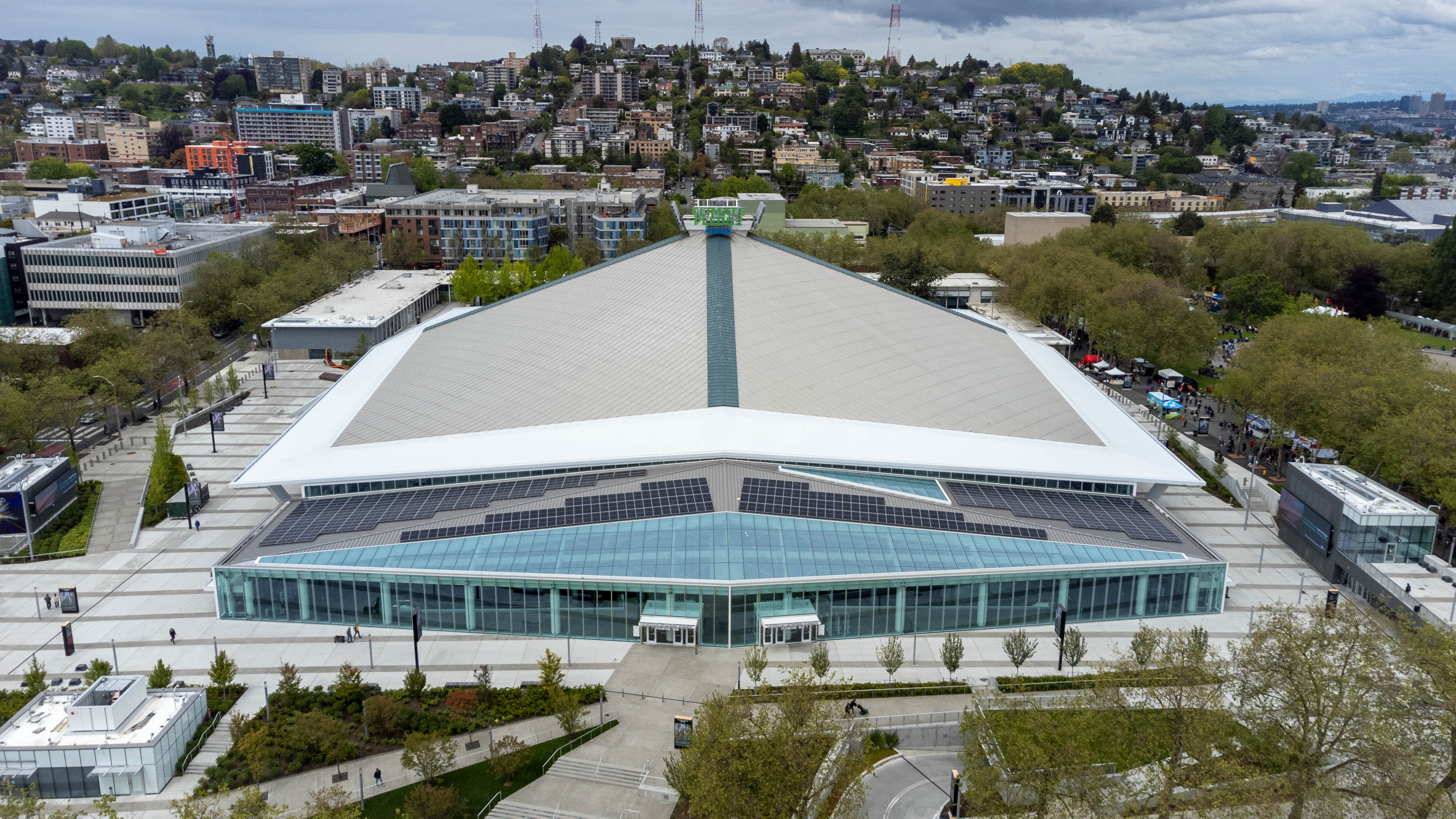
The second annual Over the Limit was held at the KeyArena in Seattle, Washington.

In 2010, the professional wrestling company WWE discontinued its previously annual May pay-per-view (PPV) event Judgment Day and replaced it with an event titled Over the Limit. The event's name was a reference to its main event match being contested as an "I Quit" match. A second Over the Limit was scheduled for May 22, 2011, at the KeyArena in Seattle, Washington, establishing Over the Limit as the new annual May PPV. It featured wrestlers from the Raw and SmackDown brands.

This was the first Over the Limit held to be promoted under the company's shortened trade name of WWE, as following WrestleMania XXVII the previous month, the company ceased using its full name of World Wrestling Entertainment, although that remains the legal name of the company.

=== Storylines ===
The professional wrestling matches at Over the Limit featured professional wrestlers performing as characters in scripted events pre-determined by the hosting promotion, WWE. Storylines between the characters were produced on WWE's weekly television shows Raw and SmackDown with the Raw and SmackDown brands—storyline divisions in which WWE assigned its employees to different programs.

The main feud from the Raw brand heading into Over the Limit was between John Cena and The Miz over the WWE Championship. John Cena won the WWE Championship from The Miz in a triple threat Steel Cage match that also featured John Morrison at Extreme Rules. The Miz invoked his rematch clause the following night. He initially won the match by hitting Cena with the WWE Championship belt, but the referee immediately reversed his decision after seeing the belt in the ring. Thus, The Miz was disqualified and Cena retained the championship via disqualification. On the May 9 episode of Raw, The Miz defeated Rey Mysterio and Alberto Del Rio to earn another shot at the WWE Championship. Later that night, Cena announced that their match would be an "I Quit" match.

The main feud on the SmackDown brand was between Randy Orton and Christian over the World Heavyweight Championship. At Extreme Rules, Christian defeated Alberto Del Rio in a Ladder match to win his first World Heavyweight Championship. On the following episode of SmackDown, aired on May 6, Randy Orton defeated Christian to win the World Heavyweight Championship. The following week, it was announced that Christian would invoke his rematch clause against Randy Orton at Over the Limit.

An ongoing feud involved Raw commentators Michael Cole and Jerry Lawler. At WrestleMania XXVII, Lawler made Cole submit to the ankle lock, but the anonymous Raw General Manager reversed the special guest referee, Stone Cold Steve Austin's decision, making Cole the winner via disqualification. At Extreme Rules, Cole teamed up with Jack Swagger to face and defeat Lawler and Jim Ross in a tag team Country Whipping match after Cole pinned Jim Ross. On Raw on May 9, Lawler challenged Cole to another match with a stipulation that Lawler would give him his Hall of Fame Ring and, should Cole be honored, personally induct him into the WWE Hall of Fame. After an altercation, Jack Swagger agreed to the match on behalf of Cole. A contract signing for the match took place on the May 16 where it was revealed after the contract was signed that the match is also going to be a "Kiss My Foot" match, where the loser must kiss the winner's feet.

Another feud from the SmackDown brand involved former allies Intercontinental Champion Wade Barrett, and the rest of The Corre, against Ezekiel Jackson. At Extreme Rules, Barrett and Jackson faced the WWE Tag Team Champions Big Show and Kane. Ezekiel had the early advantage in the match. However, Barrett tagged himself in the match just to get pinned by Big Show. The following week, Jackson decided to leave the Corre. Later that night, his former teammates Heath Slater, Justin Gabriel, and Barrett attacked him in the locker room. On May 13, on SmackDown, Barrett challenged Jackson to a match at Over the Limit for the WWE Intercontinental Championship.

Another feud from the Raw brand involved R-Truth and Rey Mysterio. On May 9, Mysterio and R-Truth, along with The Miz and Alberto Del Rio, had a confrontation over the number one contendership to the WWE Championship. The anonymous Raw General Manager, however, announced that only Mysterio, Del Rio and The Miz were to compete for the number one contendership in a triple threat match. R-Truth still believes that he is better than the other three, especially Rey Mysterio. After the Triple Threat match, which was won by The Miz, Truth attacked Mysterio in the ring. The following week, R-Truth announced that he would face Mysterio at Over the Limit.

On May 16, it was announced that The Big Show and Kane would defend the WWE Tag Team Championship against Mason Ryan and CM Punk from the New Nexus at Over the Limit.

On SmackDown, on May 20, it was announced that Brie Bella would defend her WWE Divas Championship against Kelly Kelly at Over the Limit. On the same night, Chavo Guerrero announced that he would be facing Sin Cara.

== Event ==
Other on-screen personnel
Role:	Name:
English commentators	Michael Cole
English commentators	Jerry Lawler
English commentators	Booker T
English commentators	Josh Mathews
English commentators	Jim Ross (John Cena vs. The Miz)
English commentators	Matt Striker (John Cena vs. The Miz)
Spanish commentators	Marcelo Rodríguez
Spanish commentators	Hugo Savinovich
Backstage interviewer	Josh Mathews
Ring announcers	Tony Chimel
Ring announcers	Justin Roberts
Referees	Mike Chioda
Referees	Charles Robinson
Referees	John Cone
Referees	Jack Doan
Referees	Chad Patton
Referees	Scott Armstrong
Referees	Justin King

=== Preliminary matches ===
The event opened with R-Truth facing Rey Mysterio. R-Truth performed a Shut Up on Mysterio to win the match.

Next, Wade Barrett defended the Intercontinental Championship against Ezekiel Jackson. In the end, Jackson applied the Torture Rack on Barrett but Heath Slater and Justin Gabriel interfered, resulting in Jackson winning by disqualification, but not the title.

After that, Sin Cara faced Chavo Guerrero. Sin Cara performed a Tilt-A-Whirl Headscissors Takedown on Guerrero to win the match.

In the fourth match, Big Show and Kane defended the WWE Tag Team Championship against The New Nexus (CM Punk and Mason Ryan). The match ended when Big Show and Kane performed a double Chokeslam on Ryan to retain the titles.

Later, Brie Bella defended the WWE Divas Championship against Kelly Kelly. Brie performed a Bella Buster on Kelly to retain the title.

=== Main event matches ===
In the sixth match, Randy Orton defended the World Heavyweight Championship against Christian. During the match, Orton attempted a Punt Kick but Christian performed a Spear on Orton for a near-fall. In the climax, Christian attempted a Killswitch but Orton and performed an RKO on Christian to retain the title.

In the seventh match, Jerry Lawler faced Michael Cole in a Kiss My Foot Match. Lawler performed a Diving Fist Drop on Cole to win the match. After the match, Eve performed a diving Moonsault on Cole, Jim Ross poured barbecue sauce over Cole and Bret Hart applied the sharpshooter on Cole whilst Cole kissed Lawler's foot.

In the main event, John Cena defended the WWE Championship against The Miz in an "I Quit" match. At the start of the match, Cena took control of The Miz whilst attacking Alex Riley. Cena applied the STF on The Miz but Riley broke the hold. Cena performed an Attitude Adjustment on The Miz but Riley hit Cena with a briefcase. After The Miz and Riley double-teamed Cena, The Miz performed a Snap DDT onto the steel steps but Cena refused to quit. Cena managed to push Riley into the ring post but The Miz hit Cena with a chair. Cena took control of The Miz and Cena pushed Riley, knocking him into the referee. When Riley asked Cena whether he wanted to quit, Cena was heard saying "I quit", seemingly resulting in The Miz winning the title. After the referee heard a recording of Cena saying "I quit", the match was restarted. Cena performed an Attitude Adjustment on Riley through the broadcast table and hit The Miz with a leather belt whilst The Miz ran up the entrance ramp. Cena applied the STF on The Miz, who quit, resulting in Cena retaining the title.

== Reception ==
The event received mixed reviews from critics. In his review for The Sun, Rob McNichol reported that the main event saw John Cena in a "typical 'superman' performance, Cena suffered a torturous beating before recovering to beat the former champion". "It was an old-fashioned, Hogan-esque performance which the young fans who look to Cena as a superhero would have adored, while many purists would have cringed at the contrived narrative".

The SmackDown main event and both wrestlers involved were highly praised, being described as "a tremendous match that will no doubt gain universal praise" and that "Christian has developed into a very accomplished wrestler, and Orton is arguably the best all rounder in the game right now, so a cracking match was not a surprise". In 2021, Christian named the match as his favorite WWE match, saying it was "probably the Over the Limit match against Randy Orton".

The opening bout between Rey Mysterio vs R Truth was mentioned as being "a satisfactory opening match" and adding that "R-Truth entering the arena to no music — another nice touch in the development in Ron Killings' new heel persona".

Sin Cara beat Chavo Guerrero in what was "virtually a showcase match for the former Mistico, but once again the masked Mexican failed to truly shine, making a hash of the finish".

The match between Jerry Lawler and Michael Cole was mixed, but Jim Ross and Bret Hart's appearances were praised by critics.

The Sun awarded WWE Over the Limit 2011 6.5 out of 10.

== Aftermath ==
The 2011 Over the Limit was the last Over the Limit held during the first brand extension, which ended in August.

Ezekiel Jackson continued his feud with Wade Barrett, with each man attacking the other after matches. Jackson defeated Barrett in a rematch at Capitol Punishment to capture the WWE Intercontinental Championship.

== Results ==
No.	Results	Stipulations	Times
1^{D}	Daniel Bryan defeated Drew McIntyre by submission	Singles match	—
2	R-Truth defeated Rey Mysterio by pinfall	Singles match	08:12
3	Ezekiel Jackson defeated Wade Barrett (c) by disqualification	Singles match for the WWE Intercontinental Championship	07:27
4	Sin Cara defeated Chavo Guerrero by pinfall	Singles match	07:23
5	Big Show and Kane (c) defeated The New Nexus (CM Punk and Mason Ryan) by pinfall	Tag team match for the WWE Tag Team Championship	09:06
6	Brie Bella (c) (with Nikki Bella) defeated Kelly Kelly by pinfall	Singles match for the WWE Divas Championship	04:03
7	Randy Orton (c) defeated Christian by pinfall	Singles match for the World Heavyweight Championship	16:52
8	Jerry Lawler defeated Michael Cole by pinfall	Kiss my Foot match Had Lawler lost, he would have had to give his Hall of Fame ring to Cole and personally induct Cole into The Hall of Fame.	03:01
9	John Cena (c) defeated The Miz (with Alex Riley)	"I Quit" match for the WWE Championship	24:56
(c) / – the champion(s) heading into the match; D / – this was a dark match
