= Battleground (2013) =

WWE pay-per-view event

- Promotional poster featuring Ryback
- Promotion: WWE
- Date: October 6, 2013
- City: Buffalo, New York
- Venue: First Niagara Center
- Attendance: 11,700
- Buy rate: 114,000

Pay-per-view chronology
← Previous; Night of Champions	Next → Hell in a Cell

Battleground chronology
← Previous; First	Next → 2014

The 2013 Battleground was a professional wrestling pay-per-view (PPV) event produced by WWE. It was the inaugural Battleground and took place on Sunday, October 6, 2013, at the First Niagara Center in Buffalo, New York. Battleground was originally announced to be the new annual October PPV for the promotion; however, it was moved up to July the following year. It replaced Over the Limit, which had been previously held in May but was planned to be held in October for 2013.

Nine matches were contested at the event, including one on the Kickoff pre-show. The main event, which was a match for the vacant WWE Championship between Daniel Bryan and Randy Orton, ended in a no contest after Big Show interfered and attacked Bryan, Orton, and the referee. In other prominent matches, Alberto Del Rio defeated Rob Van Dam by submission in a Hardcore match to retain the World Heavyweight Championship and Cody Rhodes and Goldust defeated The Shield (Seth Rollins and Roman Reigns).

The event received 114,000 pay-per-view buys worldwide, making it the second lowest number (behind 2006's ECW December to Dismember) in the previous 17 years. This was the only Battleground to broadcast exclusively via traditional PPV outlets due to the launch of the WWE Network streaming service in February 2014. This was also the only to feature the previous version of the World Heavyweight Championship, which was unified with the WWE Championship in December.

== Production ==
=== Background ===
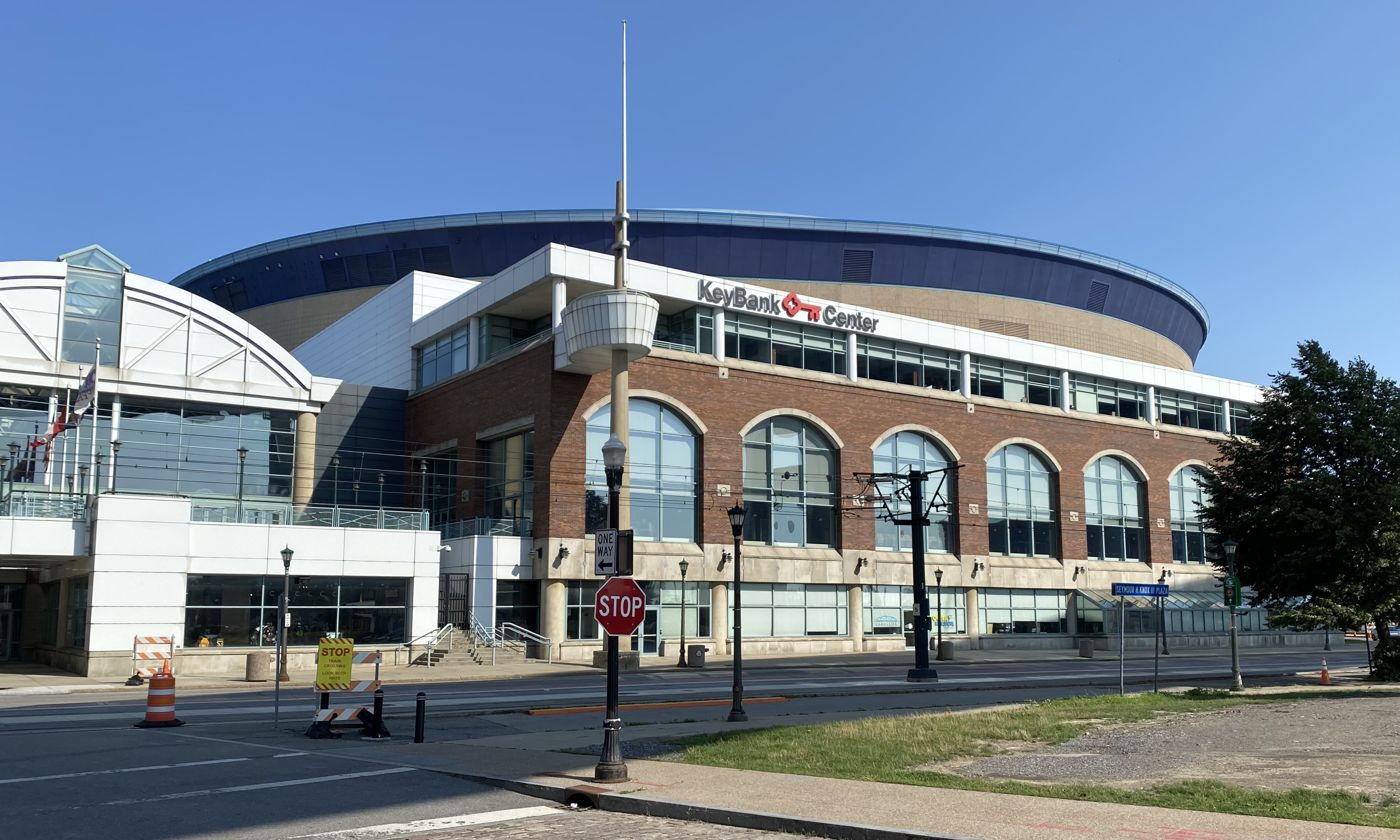
The inaugural Battleground was held at the First Niagara Center in Buffalo, New York.

From 2010 to 2012, WWE held an annual professional wrestling pay-per-view (PPV) event in May called Over the Limit. A fourth event was originally scheduled for 2013 but pushed back to October; however, in July that year, WWE revealed that Over the Limit had been discontinued and replaced by a new event called Battleground. It was officially announced during the July 29, 2013, episode of Raw and was scheduled to be held on October 6 that year at the First Niagara Center in Buffalo, New York. Tickets went on sale on August 3 via Ticketmaster.

=== Storylines ===
The event comprised nine matches, including one on the Kickoff pre-show, that resulted from scripted storylines. Results were predetermined by WWE's writers, while storylines were produced on WWE's weekly television shows, Raw and SmackDown.

After defeating Randy Orton at Night of Champions for the WWE Championship, Daniel Bryan was stripped of the title when referee Scott Armstrong admitted to a fast 3-count. However, Triple H did not give Orton the title back since he and his wife Stephanie McMahon believed that Orton's performance at Night of Champions was not what they wanted the face of WWE to be, stating that they wanted the more ruthless Orton that they feuded with previously. Bryan and Orton were scheduled to face off once more for the vacant championship.

On September 23, Brie Bella pinned AJ Lee during a 10-diva tag team match, leading to Brie receiving a match for AJ's Divas Championship at the pay-per-view.

At Night of Champions, Rob Van Dam defeated World Heavyweight Champion Alberto Del Rio by disqualification. On the September 20 episode of SmackDown, Triple H gave Van Dam a rematch with Del Rio at Battleground. Immediately afterwards, Del Rio viciously assaulted Van Dam backstage. The next week, the match was declared a Hardcore match. On the October 4 episode of SmackDown, Van Dam defeated Fandango by disqualification, but after the match, Van Dam placed a trash can at Fandango's face, and executed a Van Terminator. Later that night, Van Dam sent the broken trash can to Del Rio as a gift.

CM Punk began feuding with Paul Heyman in July after Heyman cost him the Money in the Bank ladder match for a WWE Championship contract at Money in the Bank (due to Punk earlier telling Heyman he didn't want him to be his manager). This resulted in Punk fighting and losing to Brock Lesnar at SummerSlam. Punk continued to feud with Heyman and his other client, Curtis Axel resulting in a handicap elimination match at Night of Champions. After Axel was eliminated, Punk handcuffed and beat down Heyman much like Heyman had done to him a couple of weeks prior on Raw. However, Ryback made the save, putting Punk through a table and costing him the match. On the September 23 episode of Raw, a match between Punk and Ryback was scheduled for Battleground.

Cody Rhodes was fired from WWE due to perceived insubordination by Triple H. His brother, Goldust then started lobbying for Cody to be reinstated. On the September 30 episode of Raw, the Rhodes brothers were scheduled to wrestle the WWE Tag Team Champions, Seth Rollins and Roman Reigns of The Shield, in a non-title match. Triple H and Stephanie McMahon decided that if Rhodes brothers won, Cody would be reinstated, but if they lost, Goldust and Cody's father Dusty Rhodes, who was a trainer at NXT, would also be fired and the Rhodes Family banned from WWE.

The same night, R-Truth defeated Intercontinental Champion Curtis Axel in a non-title match. Two nights later on Main Event, a title match between the two was scheduled for Battleground.

On the September 30 Raw and the October 4 SmackDown, Bray Wyatt delivered cryptic messages to Kofi Kingston after Kingston's matches, leading to a match between them at the pay-per-view.

Santino Marella and The Great Khali were also scheduled to take on The Real Americans (Antonio Cesaro and Jack Swagger).

== Event ==
Other on-screen personnel
Role:	Name:
English Commentators	Michael Cole
English Commentators	Jerry Lawler
English Commentators	John "Bradshaw" Layfield
Spanish Commentators	Carlos Cabrera
Spanish Commentators	Marcelo Rodriguez
Backstage interviewer	Renee Young
Ring announcers	Lilian Garcia
Ring announcers	Justin Roberts
Referees	Mike Chioda
Referees	Charles Robinson
Referees	John Cone
Referees	Jason Ayers
Referees	Scott Armstrong
Referees	Chad Patton
Referees	Marc Harris
Referees	Rod Zapata
Pre-show panel	Josh Mathews
Pre-show panel	Tensai
Pre-show panel	The Miz
Pre-show panel	Titus O'Neil

=== Pre-show ===
During the Battleground Kickoff pre-show, Dolph Ziggler defeated Damien Sandow by pinfall following a Zig-Zag.

=== Preliminary matches ===
The actual pay-per-view opened with Alberto Del Rio defending the World Heavyweight Championship against Rob Van Dam in a Hardcore match. Del Rio forced Van Dam to submit to the cross armbreaker, with his arm wrapped in a chair, to retain the title.

Next, The Great Khali and Santino Marella faced The Real Americans (Antonio Cesaro and Jack Swagger). The Real Americans won by pinfall after Cesaro pinned Khali following a Cesaro Swing.

After that, Curtis Axel defended the WWE Intercontinental Championship against R-Truth. Axel retained the title after pinning R-Truth following a hangman's facebuster.

Later, AJ Lee defended the WWE Divas Championship against Brie Bella. AJ retained her title after pinning Brie with a Schoolboy pin.

In the fifth match Cody Rhodes and Goldust faced off against WWE Tag Team Champions The Shield (Seth Rollins and Roman Reigns), with the Rhodes family's jobs on the line. Rhodes and Goldust won after Rhodes pinned Rollins after a Cross Rhodes.

After that, Bray Wyatt faced Kofi Kingston. Wyatt won after executing the Sister Abigail for the win.

The seventh match pitted CM Punk against Ryback. In the end, Ryback's manager Paul Heyman took out a kendo stick from under the ring and attempt to hit Punk with it. While the referee was distracted, Punk hit Ryback with a low blow to win the match.

=== Main event ===
The main event saw Daniel Bryan take on Randy Orton for the vacant WWE Championship. The ending came when Big Show came out and knocked out both men, ending the match in a no contest.

== Reception ==
Battleground received negative responses. Mike Johnson of PWInsider said that "WWE failed that night" and "really owes their audience an apology". James Caldwell of Pro Wrestling Torch said that the Intercontinental Championship match and Punk-Ryback were "house show level". He continued: "WWE had to put the 'feel-good' Rhodes Family victory on the PPV to throw viewers a bone, but ending a title match for the vacant WWE Title without a finish and putting the spotlight on Big Show isn't going to build a lot of goodwill with an audience that is checking out of Raw right now. Overall, the main event was a notch or two below last month's offering. They just never moved into second gear". The event was voted by the Wrestling Observer Newsletter as the worst major wrestling show of 2013.

== Aftermath ==
The next night on Raw, Randy Orton was scheduled to face Daniel Bryan once again at Hell in a Cell in a Hell in a Cell match with the audience choosing Booker T, Bob Backlund, or Shawn Michaels as the special guest referee, with Michaels winning the vote. Orton won the match after Michaels superkicked Bryan for attacking Triple H.

After knocking out Bryan and Orton, Big Show was fired by Stephanie McMahon. Big Show reacted by knocking out Triple H later that night and Raw General Manager Brad Maddox on the October 18 episode of SmackDown. On the October 21 episode of Raw, he drove a truck to the arena to stop the Authority and Orton, and the following week, he knocked Orton out. Big Show was banned from WWE by Triple H but on the November 4 episode of Raw, he was reinstated to face Orton for the WWE Championship at Survivor Series, which Orton won.

With Rob Van Dam out of the title picture, Alberto Del Rio tried to coerce Vickie Guerrero to make him the "face of the WWE" due to the fact he was the only active major champion. Later that night, Del Rio went to compete against Ricardo Rodriguez. Vickie scheduled Del Rio to defend the World Heavyweight Championship against John Cena, who had been out of action since SummerSlam with to an elbow injury. Del Rio attacked Rodriguez with a chair after he won the match. Del Rio lost the title to Cena at Hell in a Cell.

CM Punk continued his feud with Paul Heyman and Ryback. On October 9, CM Punk was scheduled to face Ryback again at Hell in a Cell. On the October 14 episode of Raw, Heyman complained to General Manager Brad Maddox that Punk used a low blow to defeat Ryback while the referee's back was turned, so Maddox scheduled a Beat the Clock Challenge, in which whoever won their match in the shortest time (assuming both Ryback and Punk would win), could then pick the stipulation at Hell in a Cell. Ryback defeated R-Truth in 5:44, and Punk pinned Curtis Axel in 5:33, allowing Punk to pick the stipulation. Punk chose to fight both Ryback and Heyman in a Hell in a Cell handicap match. Punk won the match and attacked Heyman on the top of the cell.

Cody Rhodes and Goldust challenged Seth Rollins and Roman Reigns again for the WWE Tag Team Championship in a no disqualification tag team match. Rhodes and Goldust defeated Rollins and Reigns after Big Show knocked out both Shield members, thus becoming the new champions.

AJ Lee was legitimately sent home from the following night's Raw after she showed signs of a concussion stemming from her title defense at Battleground. On the October 18 episode of SmackDown, Brie Bella defeated Lee in a non-title match and three days later on Raw, she along with her sister Nikki defeated AJ and Tamina Snuka with Brie pinning AJ again, earning Brie a title match at Hell in a Cell.

A second Battleground was held the following year, thus establishing Battleground as an annual event, although this second event was moved up to July. This second event in turn established Battleground as WWE's annual July PPV until the final event in 2017. That 2017 event was held exclusively for wrestlers from the SmackDown brand after the reintroduction of the brand extension in July 2016 in which the roster was divided between the Raw and SmackDown brands where wrestlers were exclusively assigned to perform. Battleground was expected to return in 2018 for the Raw brand; however, the event was taken off WWE's PPV lineup as after WrestleMania 34 that year, brand-exclusive PPVs were discontinued, resulting in WWE reducing the amount of yearly PPVs produced. Battleground was then reinstated in 2023 for WWE's developmental brand, NXT.

This was the only Battleground to broadcast exclusively via traditional PPV outlets due to the launch of the WWE Network streaming service in February 2014. It was also the only Battleground to feature the previous version of the World Heavyweight Championship, which was unified with the WWE Championship in December at TLC: Tables, Ladders & Chairs; the World Heavyweight Championship was immediately retired while the WWE Championship became known as the WWE World Heavyweight Championship. Battleground had also originally been announced to be the new annual October PPV, however, it was moved up to July the following year.

== Results ==
No.	Results	Stipulations	Times
1^{P}	Dolph Ziggler defeated Damien Sandow by pinfall	Singles match	10:08
2	Alberto Del Rio (c) defeated Rob Van Dam by submission	Hardcore match for the World Heavyweight Championship	16:04
3	The Real Americans (Jack Swagger and Antonio Cesaro) (with Zeb Colter) defeated Santino Marella and The Great Khali (with Hornswoggle) by pinfall	Tag team match	7:06
4	Curtis Axel (c) (with Paul Heyman) defeated R-Truth by pinfall	Singles match for the WWE Intercontinental Championship	7:40
5	AJ Lee (c) (with Tamina Snuka) defeated Brie Bella (with Nikki Bella) by pinfall	Singles match for the WWE Divas Championship	6:38
6	Cody Rhodes and Goldust (with Dusty Rhodes) defeated The Shield (Seth Rollins and Roman Reigns) (with Dean Ambrose) by pinfall	Tag team match Since Cody and Goldust won, they were reinstated by WWE. Had The Shield won, Dusty would have lost his job as an NXT trainer and the Rhodes family would have been terminated from WWE.	13:55
7	Bray Wyatt (with Luke Harper and Erick Rowan) defeated Kofi Kingston by pinfall	Singles match	8:17
8	CM Punk defeated Ryback (with Paul Heyman) by pinfall	Singles match	14:47
9	Daniel Bryan vs. Randy Orton ended in a no contest	Singles match for the vacant WWE Championship	25:22
(c) / – the champion(s) heading into the match; P / – the match was broadcast on the pre-show
