= NXT Battleground (2023) =

WWE premium live event

- Promotional poster featuring Tiffany Stratton, Carmelo Hayes, Bron Breakker, Roxanne Perez, and Wes Lee
- Promotion: WWE
- Brand: NXT
- Date: May 28, 2023
- City: Lowell, Massachusetts
- Venue: Tsongas Center
- Attendance: 3,482

WWE event chronology
← Previous; Night of Champions	Next → Money in the Bank

Battleground chronology
← Previous; 2017	Next → 2024

NXT major events chronology
← Previous; Stand & Deliver	Next → The Great American Bash

The 2023 NXT Battleground was a professional wrestling premium live event (PLE) produced by WWE, held exclusively for wrestlers from the promotion's developmental brand, NXT. It was NXT's first annual Battleground and WWE's sixth overall. The event took place during Memorial Day weekend on Sunday, May 28, 2023, at the Tsongas Center in Lowell, Massachusetts.

Six matches were contested at the event. In the main event, Carmelo Hayes defeated Bron Breakker to retain the NXT Championship. In other prominent matches, Tiffany Stratton defeated Lyra Valkyria in a tournament final to win the vacant NXT Women's Championship, Noam Dar defeated Dragon Lee to retain the NXT Heritage Cup, Gallus (Mark Coffey and Wolfgang) defeated The Creed Brothers (Brutus Creed and Julius Creed) to retain the NXT Tag Team Championship, and in the opening bout, Wes Lee defeated Tyler Bate and Joe Gacy in a triple threat match to retain the NXT North American Championship.

Battleground was previously held as an annual event for WWE's main roster from 2013 to 2017, making this the first Battleground held since 2017, subsequently being the first to be branded as a "premium live event", a term the company introduced at the start of 2022 to refer to its events airing on traditional pay-per-view (PPV) and via WWE's livestreaming platforms. In addition to the WWE Network in most international markets, this was the first Battleground to livestream on Peacock in the United States, SonyLIV in India, Disney+ Hotstar in Indonesia, Disney+ in the Philippines, and Binge in Australia. It was also the first Battleground to not air on PPV as WWE ceased broadcasting NXT's events on PPV in 2022.

The PLE was held on the same day as Double or Nothing, a PPV event produced by All Elite Wrestling (AEW), which at the time was AEW's flagship event. This marked the first time since April 1989 that two major promotions produced major events head-to-head, after WWE's WrestleMania V and World Championship Wrestling's Clash of the Champions VI. The event received highly positive reviews from critics, with the Last Man Standing match being singled out for its brutality, story, and the performances of Ilja Dragunov and Dijak, and was labeled a match of the year contender for WWE. The North American Championship triple threat and the NXT Women's Championship match also received praise.

== Production ==
=== Background ===
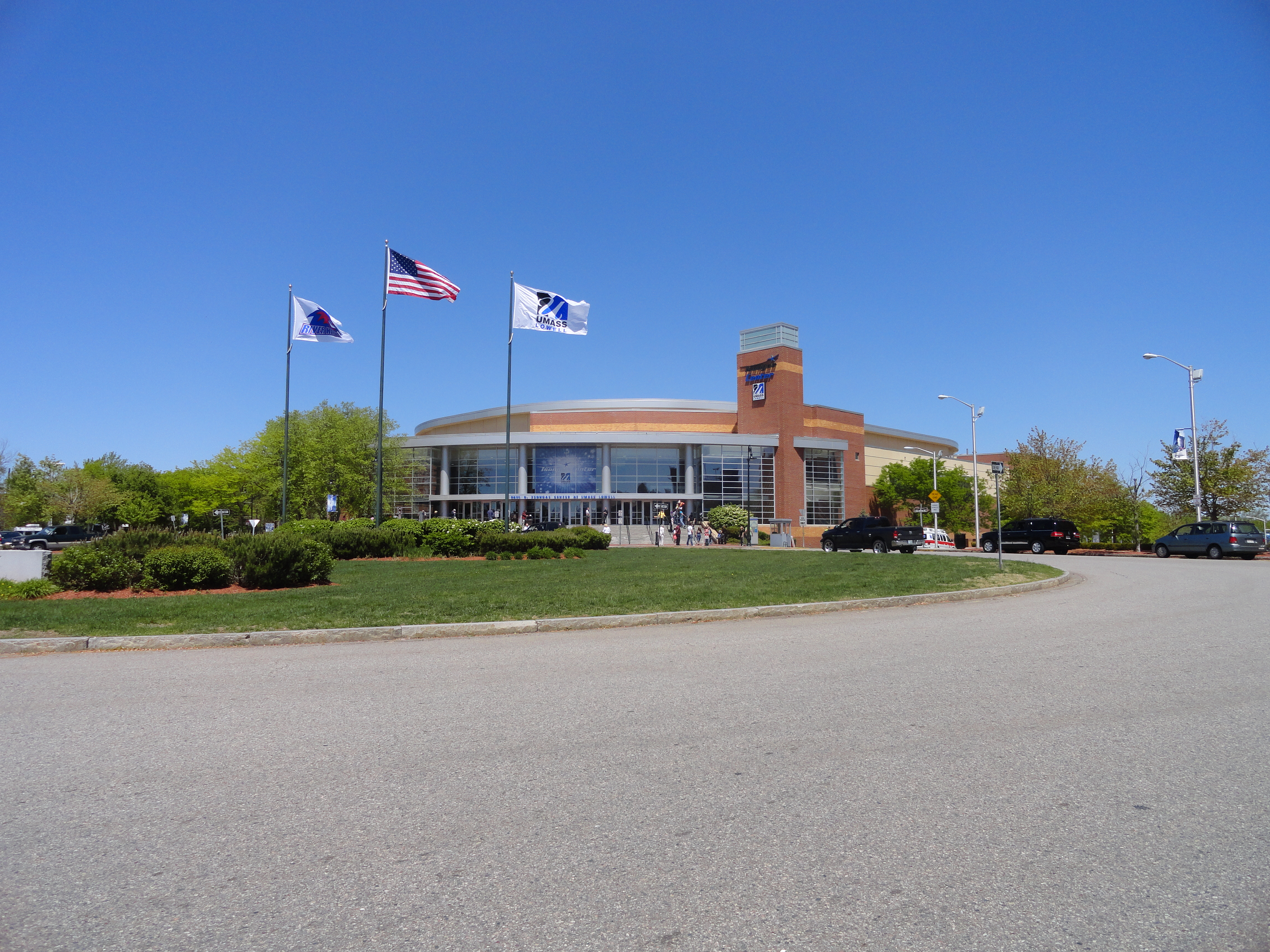
NXT's first annual Battleground, and WWE's sixth overall, was held at the Tsongas Center in Lowell, Massachusetts.

Battleground was previously an annual July event established by WWE in 2013 for its main roster, although the inaugural 2013 event was held in October. It was broadcast exclusively on pay-per-view (PPV) in 2013 before it began simultaneously livestreaming on the WWE Network in 2014. Battleground continued until its final event in 2017, which was held exclusively for wrestlers from the promotion's SmackDown brand division, following the reintroduction of the brand extension in July 2016 where WWE split the main roster between the Raw and SmackDown brands where wrestlers were exclusively assigned to perform. A Raw-exclusive Battleground was expected to be held in 2018, but it was taken off of WWE's calendar as following WrestleMania 34 in April that year, WWE discontinued brand-exclusive PPV and livestreaming events, resulting in the reduction of these events produced per year.

On March 30, 2023, after six years, WWE reinstated Battleground for its developmental brand, NXT, and it was scheduled to take place during Memorial Day weekend on Sunday, May 28, 2023, at the Tsongas Center in Lowell, Massachusetts. Tickets went on sale on April 1. This was subsequently the first Battleground to be branded as a "premium live event" (PLE), a term the company introduced on January 1, 2022, to refer to its events that are available on PPV and via WWE's livestreaming platforms.

The PLE went head-to-head with Double or Nothing, a PPV event produced by All Elite Wrestling (AEW), which at the time was AEW's flagship event. This marked the first time since 1989 that two major promotions produced major events head-to-head, after WWE's WrestleMania V (airing on PPV) and World Championship Wrestling's Clash of the Champions VI (airing on TBS). According to WWE executive Shawn Michaels, the scheduling was not intended for WWE to go head-to-head with AEW, but that it was just due to the holiday that weekend as he said WWE events had always done well on holidays.

=== Broadcast outlets ===
As a result of WWE no longer broadcasting NXT's PLEs on traditional PPV as of 2022, the 2023 Battleground aired on WWE's livestreaming platforms. These included Peacock in the United States, SonyLIV in India, Disney+ Hotstar in Indonesia, Disney+ in the Philippines, Binge in Australia, and the WWE Network everywhere else. This marked the first Battleground to air on SonyLIV, Peacock, Disney+ Hotstar, Disney+, and Binge, after those countries' respective versions of the WWE Network merged under those services in February 2021, April 2021, January 2022, November 2022, and January 2023, respectively.

=== Storylines ===
The card included six matches that resulted from scripted storylines. Results were predetermined by WWE's writers on the NXT brand, while storylines were produced on WWE's weekly television program, NXT, and the supplementary online streaming show, Level Up.

At Stand & Deliver, Carmelo Hayes defeated Bron Breakker to win the NXT Championship, ending Breakker's reign at 362 days. On the following episode of NXT, Breakker embraced Hayes and Trick Williams, but turned on them. At NXT: Spring Breakin' after Hayes's successful title defense, Hayes challenged Breakker to a title match at Battleground, only for Breakker to lay out Hayes and Williams. The following week, Breakker accepted the challenge.

During the 2023 WWE Draft, NXT Women's Champion Indi Hartwell was drafted to the main roster on Raw. She had also recently injured her leg. On the May 2 episode of NXT, Hartwell announced that she would be vacating the title and that a tournament to crown a new champion would begin the following week with the final at Battleground. The tournament participants were revealed on May 8.

In April 2023, after months of inactivity following the closure of NXT's sister United Kingdom-based brand, NXT UK, reigning NXT UK Heritage Cup Champion Noam Dar made his debut for NXT, with the title subsequently transferred to the brand and renamed as NXT Heritage Cup. On the May 16 episode of NXT, Dar hosted his first United States installment of "Supernova Sessions" and had Dragon Lee as his guest. Dar bragged about his Heritage Cup and lorded it over Lee, much to Lee's annoyance. Lee urged Dar to defend his championship but Dar resisted until Nathan Frazer interrupted and addressed Dar's constant dodging of title defenses. Provoked by this, Dar accepted Lee's challenge for the Heritage Cup at Battleground, marking the first defense of the Heritage Cup on the NXT brand and subsequently its first defense in the United States.

On the May 2 episode of NXT, Wes Lee successfully retained the NXT North American Championship after interference from Tyler Bate. The following week, Bate (accompanied by Lee) won his match after interference from Joe Gacy. On the May 16 episode, Bate and Lee were attacked backstage by Gacy and the other members of The Schism. Lee went to the ring to call out Gacy for the attack to which Gacy responded that Lee should not trust Bate. Despite suffering an arm injury during the attack, Bate came out to address Gacy's claims, but in the process, also admitted he was eyeing Lee's championship. Lee then said he would be willing to defend the title against both men at Battleground.

Since April, Dijak and Ilja Dragunov had been feuding with each other. At NXT: Spring Breakin', Dijak viciously attacked Dragunov backstage. On May 17, after more weeks of feuding, a Last Man Standing match between the two was scheduled for Battleground.

At Stand & Deliver, Gallus (Mark Coffey and Wolfgang) retained the NXT Tag Team Championship in a triple threat tag team match involving The Creed Brothers (Julius Creed and Brutus Creed). The Creed Brothers got a championship rematch on the April 18 episode of NXT where Gallus retained. On the May 16 episode, after The Creed Brothers won their match, they called out Gallus to another title match at Battleground, which was confirmed the following week.

== Event ==
Other on-screen personnel
Role:	Name:
Commentators	Vic Joseph
Commentators	Booker T
Spanish commentators	Marcelo Rodríguez
Spanish commentators	Jerry Soto
Ring announcer	Alicia Taylor
Referees	Adrian Butler
Referees	Chip Danning
Referees	Dallas Irvin
Referees	Derek Sanders
Referees	Joey Gonzalez
Interviewer	McKenzie Mitchell
Pre-show panel	Megan Morant
Pre-show panel	Matt Camp
Pre-show panel	Sam Roberts

=== Preliminary matches ===
The PLE began with Wes Lee defending the NXT North American Championship against Tyler Bate and Joe Gacy (accompanied by Ava) in a triple threat match. In the opening stages, Bate delivered a suplex and a standing shooting star press to Lee, but Gacy broke up the pin. Lee then delivered two Cardiac Kicks simultaneously to both Gacy and Bate for a two count. Bate then delivered the Tyler Driver '97, but Lee broke it up. Lee then delivered a Meteora, but Gacy broke it up. As Gacy was sitting on the top turnbuckle, Lee delivered a tope suicida to Bate on the outside. As Gacy attempted the Upside Down, Lee dodged it and hit the Cardiac Kick to retain the title.

The next bout was a British Rounds Rules match for the NXT Heritage Cup, contested between defending champion Noam Dar and Dragon Lee (with Nathan Frazer). In the first 5 minutes of the first round, Dar kicked Lee off the apron and started messing with Lee's mask. As the first round came to an end, Oro Mensah came out to be Dar's cornerman. In the second round, Lee delivered a headscissors takedown and a diving springboard dropkick for a two count. Dar then rolled up Lee to score the first fall (Noam 1: Lee 0). In the third round, Lee delivered a suicide dive to Dar and a diving knee strike for another two count. Dar then delivered a back elbow to Lee as the third round ended. In the penultimate round, Dar attempted a Kneebar, but Lee escaped. Lee then delivered a Pele kick and a Texas Cloverleaf, but Mensah helped Dar to reach the ropes. Mensah then pushed Frazer into the steel steps. Lee then delivered a headscissors driver to score his first fall (Noam 1: Lee 1). In the final round, Lee delivered a knee strike, a german suplex, and a sit-out powerbomb for a two count. As Lee signaled his finishing move, Jakara Jackson came down to the ring and distracted the referee, allowing Lash Legend to hit Lee with a bucket. Dar then delivered the Nova Roller to win the match and retain the title (Noam 2: Lee 1).

The next match was a Last Man Standing match contested between Ilja Dragunov and Dijak. In the closing stages, Dragunov hit the steel steps on Dijak, then put the steps on Dijak and delivered a Coast-to-Coast, but Dijak was able to get to his feet. Dijak then started choking Dragunov with a steel chair. Dragunov then delivered the Torpedo Moscow and an elbow strike to Dijak's head. Dijak was not able to get to his feet before the referee's count of 10, thus Dragunov won the match.

Next, Gallus (Wolfgang and Mark Coffey, with Joe Coffey) defended the NXT Tag Team Championship against The Creed Brothers (Brutus Creed and Julius Creed, with Ivy Nile). In the closing stages, Brutus delivered the Brutus Ball to both Wolfgang and Mark. Julius then delivered belly-to-back suplexes and a shooting star press to both Mark and Wolfgang for a two count. As Joe was distracting the referee, Nile pushed him, allowing Julius to deliver a clothesline to Joe on the outside. Ava then came out and pushed Nile into the ring post. Gallus then delivered the Gallus Gate to Julius to retain the titles.

In the penultimate match, Lyra Valkyria faced Tiffany Stratton in a tournament final for the vacant NXT Women's Championship. In the opening stages, Valkyria delivered a missile dropkick, two Northern Lights suplexes, an enzeguiri, and a crucifix powerbomb for a two count. Valkyria then delivered a release German suplex. As Valkyria attempted a spinning leg lariat, her knee tweaked, allowing Stratton to deliver a powerslam. As Stratton attempted a Moonsault, Valkyria moved out of the way and delivered the spinning leg lariat, but Stratton's feet reached the ropes. As Valkyria attempted a top rope powerbomb, Stratton countered it into a hurricana and then delivered a Death Valley Driver and the Prettiest Moonsault Ever to become the new NXT Women's Champion.

=== Main event ===
In the main event, Carmelo Hayes (with Trick Williams) defended the NXT Championship against Bron Breakker. In the opening stages, Breakker delivered a spinebuster and a belly-to-back suplex. Hayes then delivered the Fadeaway leg drop. Breakker then delivered a top rope frankensteiner for a two count. As Breakker attempted a military press powerslam, Hayes countered into a DDT. Hayes then delivered a pump kick and a springboard forearm, but Breakker prevented the referee from counting. As Breakker attempted the Steiner Recliner, Hayes escaped and hit a pump kick. As Hayes attempted a springboard clothesline, Breakker countered into a mid-air spear for a two count. Hayes then delivered a series of superkicks, a tornado DDT, and the Nothing But Net to retain the title.

== Reception ==
Dave Meltzer rated the last man standing match 4.75 stars, which was the highest rated of the night. The lowest rated matches would be the NXT Heritage Cup and the NXT Tag Team Championship matches both receiving 3.25 stars each. The opening triple threat received 3.5 stars, the same as Tiffany vs Lyra. Finally the main event received 4 stars.

== Results ==
No.	Results	Stipulations	Times
1	Wes Lee (c) defeated Tyler Bate and Joe Gacy (with Ava) by pinfall	Triple threat match for the NXT North American Championship	11:59
2	Noam Dar (c) (with Oro Mensah) defeated Dragon Lee (with Nathan Frazer) by 2–1	British Rounds Rules match for the NXT Heritage Cup	14:22
3	Ilja Dragunov defeated Dijak as Dijak was unable to make it to his feet before the referee's count of 10	Last Man Standing match	15:54
4	Gallus (Mark Coffey and Wolfgang) (with Joe Coffey) (c) defeated The Creed Brothers (Brutus Creed and Julius Creed) (with Ivy Nile) by pinfall	Tag team match for the NXT Tag Team Championship	9:33
5	Tiffany Stratton defeated Lyra Valkyria by pinfall	Tournament final for the vacant NXT Women's Championship	16:01
6	Carmelo Hayes (c) (with Trick Williams) defeated Bron Breakker by pinfall	Singles match for the NXT Championship	14:14
(c) / – the champion(s) heading into the match

=== NXT Women's Championship Tournament ===
First Round; NXT; May 9–16, 2023
Gigi Dolin	4:29
Tiffany Stratton	Pinfall
Jacy Jayne	9:06
Roxanne Perez	Pinfall
Lyra Valkyria	Pinfall
Kiana James	8:51
Fallon Henley	5:05
Cora Jade	Pinfall

Semifinals; NXT; May 23, 2023
Tiffany Stratton	Pinfall
Roxanne Perez	9:39
Lyra Valkyria	Pinfall
Cora Jade	3:41

Final; NXT Battleground; May 28, 2023
Tiffany Stratton	Pinfall
Lyra Valkyria	16:01
