= WWE Battleground =

WWE pay-per-view and livestreaming event series

- WWE Battleground logo used since 2025
- Promotions: WWE
- Brands: SmackDown (2017); NXT (2023–present)
- Other names: NXT Battleground (2023–2024)
- First event: 2013

WWE Battleground, known as NXT Battleground for 2023 and 2024, is a professional wrestling event produced by WWE, a Connecticut-based promotion. The event was established in 2013 and was held annually until 2017 for WWE's main roster. It was then revived in 2023 as an annual event for the company's developmental brand, NXT.

From 2013 to 2017, the event was broadcast on traditional pay-per-view (PPV) and beginning in 2014, it began to simultaneously be livestreamed on the WWE Network, which was extended to Peacock beginning in 2023. The inaugural 2013 event was held in October and replaced Over the Limit. In 2014, Battleground moved up to the July slot, becoming the promotion's annual July PPV. To coincide with the brand extension that was reintroduced in July 2016, the 2017 event was held exclusively for wrestlers from the SmackDown brand. The event was then discontinued as WWE reduced the amount of yearly PPVs produced after brand-exclusive PPVs were discontinued following WrestleMania 34 in April 2018. After five years, the event was revived in 2023 as an annual event for NXT; it was held in May but was pushed back to June in 2024 and then returned to May in 2025.

== History ==
On the July 29, 2013, episode of Raw, the American professional wrestling promotion WWE announced a new pay-per-view (PPV) titled Battleground to be held on October 6 that year at the First Niagara Center in Buffalo, New York. It replaced Over the Limit, which had been held annually in May from 2010 to 2012, but was going to be held in October 2013 before WWE decided to discontinue Over the Limit. The event returned in 2014, but was moved up to July, thus establishing the event as WWE's annual July PPV. In addition to PPV, the 2014 event was the first Battleground to air on WWE's livestreaming service, the WWE Network, which launched earlier that year in February.

The 2016 event was regarded as the last PPV event featuring wrestlers from both the Raw and SmackDown brands, before the newly reinstated brand extension went into full effect; after SummerSlam that year, monthly PPVs became brand-exclusive, excluding the "Big Four" (Royal Rumble, WrestleMania, SummerSlam, and Survivor Series). The 2017 event was in turn a SmackDown-exclusive event. Battleground was expected to return in 2018 for the Raw brand; however, the event was taken off WWE's PPV lineup as after WrestleMania 34 that year, brand-exclusive PPVs were discontinued, resulting in WWE reducing the amount of yearly PPVs produced. The originally planned 2018 date and location was given to Extreme Rules, which got moved up from its originally planned September scheduling.

On March 30, 2023, WWE announced that Battleground would be revived for its developmental territory, NXT, scheduled for May 28, 2023. In addition to the WWE Network, the event was livestreamed for the first time on Peacock in the United States due to the American version of the WWE Network merging under Peacock in March 2021—unlike previous Battlegrounds, it did not air on PPV as beginning with the 2022 calendar year, NXT's major events are only available via WWE's livestreaming platforms. NXT Battleground also went head-to-head with Double or Nothing, a PPV event produced by All Elite Wrestling (AEW), marking the first time since 1989 that two major promotions produced major events head-to-head, after WWE's WrestleMania V and World Championship Wrestling's Clash of the Champions VI. A second NXT Battleground was scheduled for 2024, thus establishing Battleground as an annual livestreaming event for NXT; it was originally scheduled for May 26 but was pushed back to June 9.

== Events ==
SmackDown-branded event	NXT-branded event

#	Event	Date	City	Venue	Main event	Ref.
1	Battleground (2013)	October 6, 2013	Buffalo, New York	First Niagara Center	Randy Orton vs. Daniel Bryan for the vacant WWE Championship	
2	Battleground (2014)	July 20, 2014	Tampa, Florida	Tampa Bay Times Forum	John Cena (c) vs. Randy Orton vs. Kane vs. Roman Reigns in a fatal four-way match for the WWE World Heavyweight Championship	
3	Battleground (2015)	July 19, 2015	St. Louis, Missouri	Scottrade Center	Seth Rollins (c) vs. Brock Lesnar for the WWE World Heavyweight Championship	
4	Battleground (2016)	July 24, 2016	Washington, D.C.	Verizon Center	Dean Ambrose (c) vs. Roman Reigns vs. Seth Rollins in a triple threat match for the WWE Championship	
5	Battleground (2017)	July 23, 2017	Philadelphia, Pennsylvania	Wells Fargo Center	Jinder Mahal (c) vs. Randy Orton in a Punjabi Prison match for the WWE Championship	
6	NXT Battleground (2023)	May 28, 2023	Lowell, Massachusetts	Tsongas Center	Carmelo Hayes (c) vs. Bron Breakker for the NXT Championship	
7	NXT Battleground (2024)	June 9, 2024	Enterprise, Nevada	UFC Apex	Trick Williams (c) vs. Ethan Page for the NXT Championship	
8	Battleground (2025)	May 25, 2025	Tampa, Florida	Yuengling Center	Joe Hendry (c) vs Trick Williams for the TNA World Championship	
(c) – refers to the champion(s) heading into the match

== See also ==
- List of WWE pay-per-view and livestreaming supercards
