= WWE Over the Limit =

- WWE Over the Limit 2012 logo
- Promotion: WWE
- Brands: Raw (2010–2011); SmackDown (2010–2011)
- First event: 2010
- Last event: 2012
- Signature match: "I quit" match

WWE Over the Limit was a professional wrestling pay-per-view (PPV) event produced by WWE, a professional wrestling promotion based in Connecticut. The event was created in 2010, replacing Judgment Day as the annual May PPV. The name "Over the Limit" was a reference to the hardcore-based match types that occurred as the main event match for each year: an "I Quit" match in 2010 and 2011 and a No Disqualification match in 2012. John Cena competed in the main event match at all three Over the Limit events. In 2013, as Extreme Rules was scheduled for May, Over the Limit was pushed back to October, however, it was canceled and replaced by Battleground.

== History ==
In 2010, World Wrestling Entertainment (WWE) replaced their previously annual May pay-per-view (PPV) Judgment Day with a new PPV titled Over the Limit. The inaugural event was held on May 23, 2010, at the Joe Louis Arena in Detroit, Michigan. Over the Limit would be a short-lived PPV, however, as the 2012 event was the final Over the Limit event held. In 2013, Extreme Rules took the May PPV slot, while Over the Limit was instead scheduled for October, however, it was canceled and replaced by Battleground. The name "Over the Limit" was a reference to the hardcore-based match types that occurred as the main event match for each year: an "I Quit" match in 2010 and 2011 and a No Disqualification match in 2012.

Over the Limit was introduced during WWE's first brand extension period, in which the promotion divided its roster into brands where wrestlers were exclusively assigned to perform. As such, the 2010 and 2011 events featured wrestlers from the Raw and SmackDown brands.

== Events ==
#	Event	Date	City	Venue	Main event	Ref.
1	Over the Limit (2010)	May 23, 2010	Detroit, Michigan	Joe Louis Arena	John Cena (c) vs. Batista in an "I Quit" match for the WWE Championship	
2	Over the Limit (2011)	May 22, 2011	Seattle, Washington	KeyArena	John Cena (c) vs. The Miz in an "I Quit" match for the WWE Championship	
3	Over the Limit (2012)	May 20, 2012	Raleigh, North Carolina	PNC Arena	John Cena vs. John Laurinaitis in a No Disqualification match	
(c) – refers to the champion(s) heading into the match

== See also ==
- List of WWE pay-per-view events
