= Carlos Cabrera =

Colombian former newsman

Personal information
- Born: Carlos Rodrigo Cabrera; 18 October 1959 (age 66) Bogotá, Colombia

Professional wrestling career
- Ring name: Carlos Cabrera
- Billed height: 5 ft 11 in (1.80 m)
- Billed weight: 204 lb (93 kg)
- Debut: 1993

Carlos Rodrigo Cabrera (born October 18, 1959) is a Colombian former newsman and professional wrestling commentator signed to All Elite Wrestling. He is best known for his time with WWE, where he was one half of the company's Spanish announce team, serving as the play-by-play announcer. His longtime broadcast partner was the Ecuadorian former professional wrestler Hugo Savinovich, who was the color commentator on the announce team until October 2011. He later partnered with Marcelo Rodriguez until 2022.

== Early career ==
Carlos Rodrigo Cabrera was born in Bogotá, Colombia. During his career as a newsman and radio personality, Cabrera received several awards, including the ACE Awards in the radio and television categories. Cabrera has one of the most recognizable voices in both Spanish radio and television in the United States serving as a voice-over announcer for many corporations and brands advertising their products nationally.

== Professional wrestling career ==
=== World Wrestling Federation/WWE (1993–2022) ===
Cabrera worked for WWF (now WWE) from 1993 until 2022, alongside Ed Trucco, Hugo Savinovich and later, Marcelo Rodríguez. He was the Spanish announcer on Spanish language versions of Raw, SmackDown, Superstars, NXT, and pay-per-view (PPV) events. Their audio could be accessed in the United States via the SAP feature on most television sets.

Cabrera and Savinovich had a show on WWE.com called WWE En Español (WWE in Spanish), a thirty-minute program that served as a recap of RAW, SmackDown, NXT, and pay-per-view events. The duo taped their one-hundredth episode in April 2006.

Rodríguez was a frequent substitute host of the program until October 2011, when he became permanent co-host following the departure of Savinovich from the company. For a brief period, Cabrera and Savinovich starred in a Spanglish mini-show called 28 Segundos.

In previous years, while working for WWE on its monthly pay-per-views, the announce table at which he has worked with Savinovich and Rodríguez, more commonly known as the Spanish announcers' table, has become a staple in modern professional wrestling as a convenient device on which for wrestlers to execute dramatic moves, such as the piledriver or the Pedigree, which almost always results in the destruction of the table, as it is designed to collapse on impact.

Cabrera and Rodríguez provided live Spanish commentary for all weekly shows from the WWE Television Studios in Stamford, Connecticut, and were at ringside for PPV events. This practice temporarily ended in mid-2006. Following the addition of the now-defunct ECW brand, the announce teams of all three brands were present for tri-branded pay-per-views (Royal Rumble, WrestleMania, SummerSlam, and Survivor Series). During this time, Cabrera and Hugo Savinovich provided commentary for these events from the WWE Television Studios but were still placed at ringside for brand-exclusive PPV events.

When the brand-exclusive pay-per-view concept ended in 2007, the announce teams of all three brands were placed at ringside for all PPV events. Beginning in 2009, a single three-man announce team, composed of announcers from the two active brands, was designated for pay-per-views. Cabrera and Savinovich returned to ringside for PPVs at The 25th Anniversary of WrestleMania in 2009. However, they were not reinstated full-time until WrestleMania XXVI in 2010. In October 2011, Savinovich left WWE and Marcelo Rodríguez became the permanent Spanish color commentator and co-host of WWE En Español. Also in October 2011, Cabrera and Rodríguez were at ringside for the tapings of Raw and SmackDown in Mexico City, Mexico. During the SmackDown tapings, Cabrera took part in a WWE.com exclusive in-ring segment where he helped translate Triple H's dialect to the audience as they announced Mil Máscaras as the first inductee to the WWE Hall of Fame class of 2012.

In TLC: Tables, Ladders and Chairs (2012), the 3MB tag team (Heath Slater, Jinder Mahal, and Drew McIntyre) began mocking Cabrera and Marcelo Rodriguez in a racist way (kayfabe), including an attack to Ricardo Rodriguez, only to begin a feud with Alberto Del Rio, signalling a face turn for the Mexican duo.

Cabrera called every WrestleMania as a member of the Spanish broadcast team from WrestleMania X with Ed Trucco, then from WrestleMania XI to WrestleMania XXVII with Hugo Savinovich, and from WrestleMania XXVIII to 2021 with Marcelo Rodriguez.

On February 17, 2022, Cabrera was released from the WWE, after nearly 30 years of working for the company. Two days later, Cabrera made his debut for Lucha Libre AAA Worldwide at Rey de Reyes alongside his longtime partner Hugo Savinovich and José Manuel Guillén.

=== All Elite Wrestling (2024–present) ===
During the April 17, 2024, broadcast of AEW Dynamite, it was announced that Cabrera had signed with All Elite Wrestling.
