= Marcelo Rodríguez =

Venezuelan actor and wrestling announcer

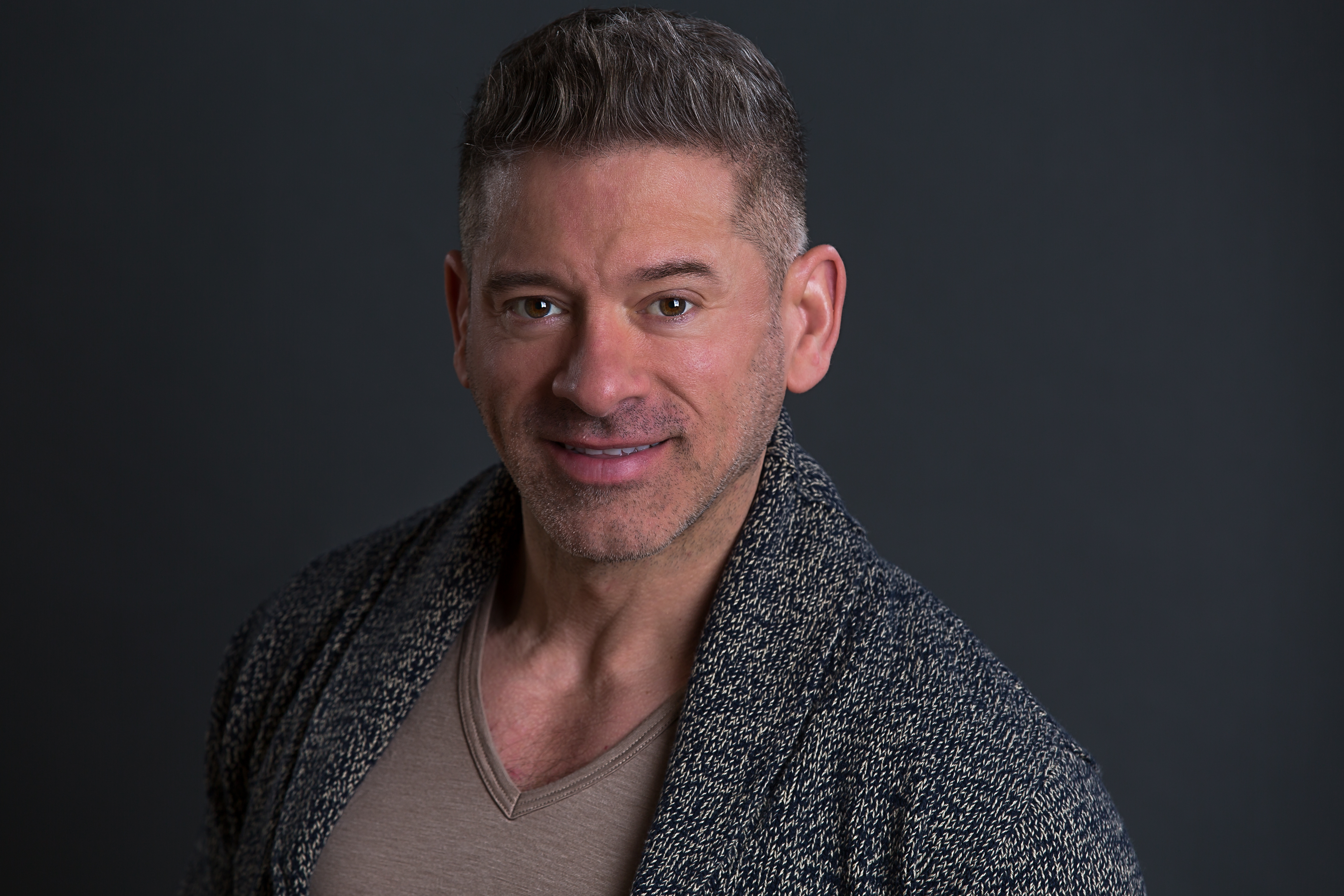
- Rodriguez in 2017

Personal information
- Born: Marcelo Antonio Rodríguez Laprea; 22 July 1969 (age 57) Caracas, Venezuela
- Education: Central University of Venezuela

Professional wrestling career
- Ring name: Marcelo Rodríguez
- Debut: 1998

Marcelo Antonio Rodríguez Laprea (born July 22, 1969) is a Venezuelan actor and professional wrestling announcer working for the international Spanish versions of WWE shows Raw, SmackDown, NXT, and pay-per-view (PPV) events alongside Jerry Soto as color commentator.

Rodríguez started working for WWE by the end of 1998 as the host of Los Super Astros and appeared only occasionally at that time, filling in for Carlos Cabrera or former color commentator Hugo Savinovich. He provided commentary for the international version of RAW and SmackDown, with Cabrera and Savinovich alternating as his broadcast partners. In October 2011, Savinovich left WWE and Rodríguez became a full-time Spanish commentator for all programs and PPV events. In October 2011, Rodríguez and Cabrera were at ringside for the tapings of Raw and SmackDown in Mexico City, Mexico.

Rodríguez was also a frequent substitute co-host of WWE en Español until October 2011, when he became a permanent co-host alongside Carlos Cabrera following Hugo Savinovich's departure from the company. He had not made any appearance on PPV since working for WWE until SummerSlam 2011. Rodríguez hosted WWE Experience for Latin America introducing clips and recaps from the previous week's episodes of Raw, SmackDown and NXT, until its cancellation in 2021.

In his spare time, Rodriguez enjoys following the NHL's New Jersey Devils and the NFL's Dallas Cowboys.

Rodríguez graduated from the Central University of Venezuela with a degree in journalism and has worked as an actor, singer, dancer, playwright and director. His theater credits in leading roles include Don Juan Tenorio (Don Juan), Mozart, the Angel Amadeus (Amadeus), The Tempest (Fernand), A Widow for Four (Arlequin), Spring Awakening (Melchor Gabor), Yerma (Juan), Absalom's Tresses (Amon), Wounded Buffalo (Don), and Lorca in a Green Dress (Lorca ensangrentado). His musical credits include Panteleón and the Visitors (Sinchi), La Verdadera Historia de Pedro Navaja (El Lince), and ¿Quién mató a Hector Lavoe? (Announcer), the longest running Spanish-language show in the history of Broadway. He has worked internationally with theater companies such as Rajatabla, the Compañía Nacional de Teatro de Venezuela (inaugural cast), the Compañía Nacional de Teatro de España, Repertorio Español (in more than two dozens of plays) and Teatro Círculo of New York and has enjoyed the privilege of being onstage in every continent.

He has been honored with several acting recognitions such as Premio Nacional del Artista and Premio Municipal (Venezuela), the Critic's Circle Award (in Puerto Rico), and HOLA, ACE and Premios Sin Límite (in New York). Some of his film credits in leading roles include Atraco en el Aeropuerto and Tacagua. Rodríguez has recorded three albums with WEA International, SonoRodven and Sonográfica. He played the leading role in the VPG infomercial show Caminos al Jaguar, which was filmed in six countries. Some of his television credits include soap operas Cara Sucia, Cristal, and La Revancha, for Venevisión-Univisión.

In 2006, Rodríguez won the Nuestras Voces National Playwriting Competition with his play Cartas a una Madre (originally Bestalia) which was produced successfully at Repertorio Español, where he was also a cast member. Cartas a una madre was published by the end of 2012. In 2009 and 2010, he was also a finalist in Nuevas Voces with his plays La Papaya Dulce and Los Súper Héroes del Abuelo.

In 2017, Rodriguez was invited by Amazon Sports Nutrition to be the Spanish host of the Mr. Olympia competition. Also in 2017, after many years without recording another full album, Rodriguez released his fourth musical project, Verde, whose profits were used to support the Yolanda Laprea Foundation and its activities in aid of the elderly.
