= List of WWE pay-per-view and livestreaming supercards =

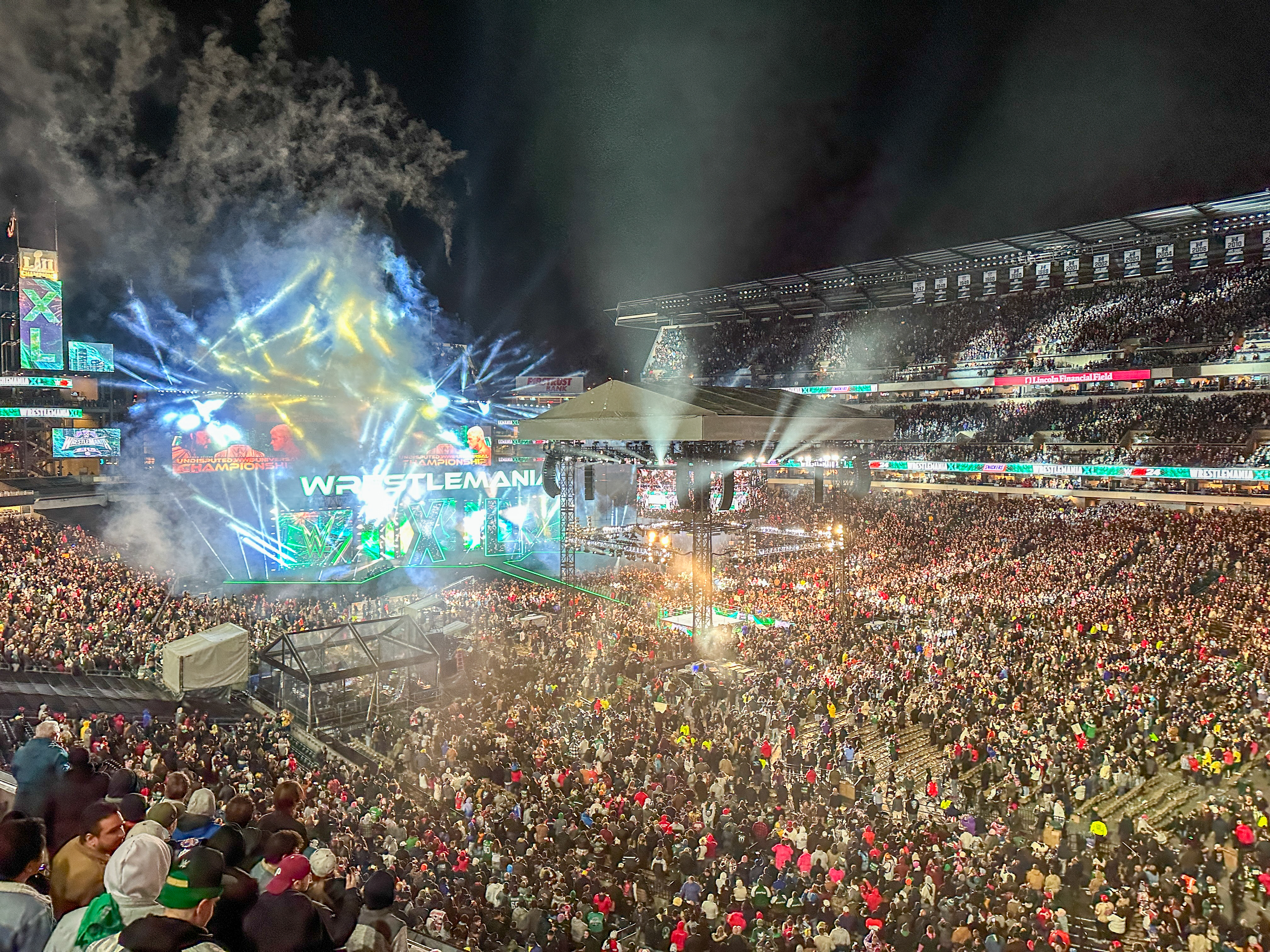
WrestleMania, WWE's longest-running and biggest pay-per-view and livestreaming supercard which has been held annually since 1985 (40th edition pictured)

This is a list of WWE pay-per-view (PPV) and livestreaming supercards, detailing all professional wrestling cards promoted by the American promotion available on traditional PPV outlets and livestreaming services, such as ESPN, Netflix, YouTube, and Peacock.

Since 2022, to emphasize the availability of these events via streaming services that hold rights to WWE's content (such as ESPN in the United States), WWE began to refer to all PPV and livestreaming events as "Premium Live Events" (PLEs).

== History ==
The American professional wrestling promotion WWE (formerly World Wrestling Federation, or WWF) has been broadcasting pay-per-view (PPV) events since the mid 1980s, when its classic "Big Four" events (Royal Rumble, WrestleMania, SummerSlam, and Survivor Series) were first established between 1985 and 1989—with the company's very first PPV being WrestleMania in 1985. The company's PPV lineup expanded to a monthly basis in 1995 following the introduction of the In Your House series of pay-per-views (which were replaced by standalone PPVs in 1999) before expanding even further in the mid-2000s during the first WWE brand extension. In addition, WWE produced international PPVs not available in the United States between 1997 and 2003. In 2022, the company began recognizing Money in the Bank as one of their five biggest events of the year, thus making it a "Big Five" event along with the classic "Big Four"; King of the Ring was considered a "Big Five" event from 1993 until 2002, after which, it was discontinued as a PPV until 2024.

Following WWE's original brand extension in 2002, the company promoted two touring rosters, Raw and SmackDown, representing its television programs, Raw and SmackDown, with the two United Kingdom PPVs held that year being the first ones to be brand exclusive. Following Judgment Day in 2003, brand-exclusive PPVs were expanded to all WWE PPVs, except the traditional "Big Four", which continued to showcase the entire roster, while the remaining PPVs alternated between Raw and SmackDown. A special Extreme Championship Wrestling (ECW) reunion PPV in 2005 led to the creation of an ECW brand in 2006, which also received its own dedicated PPV events. In March 2007, WWE announced that all subsequent non-"big-four" PPV events following WrestleMania 23 would feature performers from all brands, which ended brand-exclusive PPVs. In 2008, all WWE PPV events began broadcasting in high definition.

The company's PPV business began to drastically change with the launch of the online streaming service, the WWE Network, on February 24, 2014. WWE's focus shifted away from delivering their events solely on PPV channels, with their main focus on livestreaming all of the events on the WWE Network, including some exclusive events, such as NXT TakeOver. After the second brand extension in July 2016, brand-exclusive events returned with the "Big Four" again as the only ones to feature both the Raw and SmackDown brands. Brand-exclusive events would once again come to an end, this time after WrestleMania 34 in April 2018 with the events again featuring wrestlers from all brands.

Beginning with NXT TakeOver 31 in October 2020, the TakeOver events started airing on traditional PPV in addition to livestreaming. In late 2021, WWE discontinued the TakeOver series, but has continued to promote major NXT events periodically; however, beginning with the 2022 calendar year, WWE ceased broadcasting NXT's major events on PPV with them subsequently only available via livestreaming.

The 2021 edition of Elimination Chamber would be the beginning of WWE phasing out the standalone WWE Network, with the company partnering with other platforms to distribute its content. Beginning with that edition of Elimination Chamber in the United States, events began airing on SonyLIV in India, following a merger of the Indian WWE Network under SonyLIV in February that year. Over the next couple of years, other countries would see their own version of the WWE Network merge under other services. In the United States, the WWE Network merged under NBCUniversal's streaming service, Peacock, in April, and then in Indonesia, the WWE Network merged under Disney+ Hotstar in January 2022, followed by a merger under Disney+ in the Philippines in November that year, while in Australia, it merged under Binge in January 2023 and then Abema in Japan that October. With this increased emphasis of digital platforms over traditional PPV outlets, WWE began to refer to all PPV and livestreaming events as "Premium Live Events" (PLEs), starting with the Day 1 event on January 1, 2022.

In January 2025, the majority of the countries that still had the WWE Network merged under Netflix, with only a small number of countries maintaining the WWE Network due to pre-existing contracts. In April 2025, India transitioned its WWE content from SonyLIV to Netflix. Beginning with Wrestlepalooza in September 2025, ESPN's direct-to-consumer streaming service assumed the streaming rights for main roster PLEs in the United States as part of a five-year deal following WWE's contract with Peacock. Also as part of the deal, select events also air on ESPN's linear channels. This changeover to ESPN was originally to begin with WrestleMania 42 in April 2026, but in August 2025, it was announced the deal had been moved up. NXT's PLEs continued to air on Peacock until March 15, 2026, with Peacock only maintaining the Saturday Night's Main Event (SNME) specials as well as replays of recent episodes of SmackDown until at least 2029 as well as exclusive documentaries; outside the US, SNME streams on YouTube. In January 2026, more countries merged under Netflix, while Sub-Saharan Africa and Japan remained on SuperSport and Abema, respectively. On April 1, 2026, the last four remaining countries that were still on the standalone WWE Network transitioned to Netflix, permanently shutting down the WWE Network after 12 years. After Peacock lost NXT's PLEs in March, one event streamed on YouTube in April before WWE began a new deal with The CW in June in which 20 NXT PLEs would air on The CW's linear channel, and then beginning in August, NXT's events also began simulcasting on ESPN's streaming service. On October 1, Japan merged under Netflix.

In addition to ESPN, WWE's events are still made available on traditional PPV outlets in the United States. WWE also partnered with Fandango to broadcast PLEs in select theaters across the United States, beginning with the 2025 SummerSlam, which was initially exclusive to select Regal Cinemas, with events after SummerSlam expanding to other theater chains. In Canada, WWE's PLEs are available through Vu!, Shaw PPV, or SaskTel PPV, and was formerly shown in select locations of the Cineplex Entertainment chain. In Australia, PLEs are shown on Main Event. In the United Kingdom and Ireland, all PLEs were shown on Sky Sports Box Office until 2019, when BT Sport took over rights to WWE content. In India and South Asia, a single broadcaster (currently Sony Ten) generally holds the rights to all WWE programming, with PLEs broadcast for no additional charge.

Currently, WWE's PLEs for the Raw and SmackDown brands are generally held on Saturdays and are typically 3 to 4 hours in length, with some events running longer or shorter. NXT's PLEs have also mostly shifted to Saturdays and last between 2 to 3 hours. Prior to 2022, all PLEs were generally held on Sundays. The change was attributed to WWE president Nick Khan who felt that "big sports events were better on Saturday nights". WWE also airs a pre-show before most events which includes interviews, match previews, and a panel of experts analyzing the upcoming line-up. They were originally simply called Pre-Show, but beginning with Payback 2013, they were rebranded as Kickoff (although WrestleMania XXX in 2014 used the Pre-Show branding) before being rebranded again to WWE Countdown to [event] beginning with NXT Stand & Deliver in 2024. The pre-shows also used to host some matches but these were phased out in early 2022, although some pre-shows still occasionally have matches. WWE also airs a post-show media press conference following some events, including NXT events. Previously, they would air a post-show for some events, known as Fallout. Each Fallout included interviews and a panel of experts analyzing the event. WWE also previously held post-show editions of Raw Talk for Raw-branded events and Talking Smack for SmackDown-branded events.

== Past events ==
=== 1980s ===
==== 1985 ====
Date	Event	Venue	Location	Attendance	Final match
March 31	WrestleMania	Madison Square Garden	New York City, New York	19,121	Hulk Hogan and Mr. T vs. Roddy Piper and Paul Orndorff in a tag team match
November 7	The Wrestling Classic	Rosemont Horizon	Rosemont, Illinois	14,000	Junkyard Dog vs. Randy Savage in the Wrestling Classic tournament final

==== 1986 ====
Date	Event	Venue	Location	Attendance	Final match	Notes
April 7	WrestleMania 2	Nassau Veterans Memorial Coliseum	Uniondale, New York	16,585	Mr. T vs. Roddy Piper in a 10-round boxing match	This aired as one event, but was staged at three locations, with each match listed as the final match for that venue's card
April 7	WrestleMania 2	Rosemont Horizon	Rosemont, Illinois	9,000	The Dream Team (Greg Valentine and Brutus Beefcake) (c) vs. The British Bulldogs (Davey Boy Smith and Dynamite Kid) in a tag team match for the WWF Tag Team Championship	This aired as one event, but was staged at three locations, with each match listed as the final match for that venue's card
April 7	WrestleMania 2	Los Angeles Memorial Sports Arena	Los Angeles, California	14,500 combined (40,085)	Hulk Hogan (c) vs. King Kong Bundy in a steel cage match for the WWF World Heavyweight Championship	This aired as one event, but was staged at three locations, with each match listed as the final match for that venue's card

==== 1987 ====
Date	Event	Venue	Location	Attendance	Final match
March 29	WrestleMania III	Pontiac Silverdome	Pontiac, Michigan	78,000	Hulk Hogan (c) vs. André the Giant for the WWF World Heavyweight Championship
November 26	Survivor Series	Richfield Coliseum	Richfield Township, Ohio	21,300	Hulk Hogan, Paul Orndorff, Don Muraco, Ken Patera, and Bam Bam Bigelow vs. André the Giant, One Man Gang, King Kong Bundy, Rick Rude, and Butch Reed in a 5-on-5 Survivor Series match

==== 1988 ====
Date	Event	Venue	Location	Attendance	Final match
March 27	WrestleMania IV	Atlantic City Convention Hall	Atlantic City, New Jersey	19,199	Randy Savage vs. Ted DiBiase for the vacant WWF World Heavyweight Championship
August 29	SummerSlam	Madison Square Garden	New York City, New York	20,000	The Mega Powers (Randy Savage and Hulk Hogan) vs. The Mega Bucks (Ted DiBiase and André the Giant) in a tag team match
November 24	Survivor Series	Richfield Coliseum	Richfield Township, Ohio	13,500	The Mega Powers (Randy Savage and Hulk Hogan), Hercules, Koko B. Ware, and Hillbilly Jim vs. Big Boss Man, Akeem, Ted DiBiase, Haku, and The Red Rooster in a 5-on-5 Survivor Series match

==== 1989 ====
Date	Event	Venue	Location	Attendance	Final match
January 15	Royal Rumble	The Summit	Houston, Texas	19,000	30-man Royal Rumble match
April 2	WrestleMania V	Atlantic City Convention Hall	Atlantic City, New Jersey	18,946	Randy Savage (c) vs. Hulk Hogan for the WWF World Heavyweight Championship
August 28	SummerSlam	Brendan Byrne Arena	East Rutherford, New Jersey	20,000	Hulk Hogan and Brutus Beefcake vs. Randy Savage and Zeus in a tag team match
November 23	Survivor Series	Rosemont Horizon	Rosemont, Illinois	15,294	The Ultimate Warriors (Ultimate Warrior, Jim Neidhart, and The Rockers (Shawn Michaels and Marty Jannetty)) vs. The Heenan Family (The Colossal Connection (André the Giant and Haku), Arn Anderson, and Bobby Heenan) in a 4-on-4 Survivor Series match
December 12 (aired December 27)	No Holds Barred: The Match/The Movie	Nashville Municipal Auditorium	Nashville, Tennessee		Hulk Hogan and Brutus Beefcake vs. Randy Savage and Zeus in a tag team steel cage match

=== 1990s ===
==== 1990 ====
Date	Event	Venue	Location	Attendance	Final match
January 21	Royal Rumble	Orlando Arena	Orlando, Florida	16,000	30-man Royal Rumble match
April 1	WrestleMania VI	SkyDome	Toronto, Ontario, Canada	67,678	Hulk Hogan (WWF-c) vs. Ultimate Warrior (Intercontinental-c) in a Winner Takes All match for the WWF Championship and WWF Intercontinental Championship
August 27	SummerSlam	Spectrum	Philadelphia, Pennsylvania	19,304	Ultimate Warrior (c) vs. Rick Rude in a steel cage match for the WWF Championship
November 22	Survivor Series	Hartford Civic Center	Hartford, Connecticut	16,000	Ultimate Warrior, Hulk Hogan, and Tito Santana vs. Ted DiBiase and The Visionaries (Rick Martel, The Warlord, and Power and Glory (Hercules and Paul Roma)) in a 3-on-5 handicap Survivor Series match

==== 1991 ====
Date	Event	Venue	Location	Attendance	Final match
January 19	Royal Rumble	Miami Arena	Miami, Florida	16,000	30-man Royal Rumble match
March 24	WrestleMania VII	Los Angeles Memorial Sports Arena	Los Angeles, California	16,158	Sgt. Slaughter (c) vs. Hulk Hogan for the WWF Championship
August 26	SummerSlam	Madison Square Garden	New York City, New York	20,000	Hulk Hogan and Ultimate Warrior vs. Sgt. Slaughter, General Adnan, and Col. Mustafa in a 2-on-3 handicap match
November 27	Survivor Series	Joe Louis Arena	Detroit, Michigan	17,500	Big Boss Man and The Legion Of Doom (Hawk and Animal) vs. Irwin R. Schyster and The Natural Disasters (Earthquake and Typhoon) in a 3-on-3 Survivor Series match
December 3	This Tuesday in Texas	Freeman Coliseum	San Antonio, Texas	8,000	The Undertaker (c) vs. Hulk Hogan for the WWF Championship

==== 1992 ====
Date	Event	Venue	Location	Attendance	Final match	Notes
January 19	Royal Rumble	Knickerbocker Arena	Albany, New York	17,000	30-man Royal Rumble match for the vacant WWF Championship	
April 5	WrestleMania VIII	Hoosier Dome	Indianapolis, Indiana	62,167	Hulk Hogan vs. Sid Justice	
August 29 (aired August 31)	SummerSlam	Wembley Stadium	London, England	78,927	Bret Hart (c) vs. The British Bulldog for the WWF Intercontinental Championship	First pay-per-view to be held in the United Kingdom
November 25	Survivor Series	Richfield Coliseum	Richfield Township, Ohio	18,000	Bret Hart (c) vs. Shawn Michaels for the WWF Championship	

==== 1993 ====
Date	Event	Venue	Location	Attendance	Final match
January 24	Royal Rumble	ARCO Arena	Sacramento, California	16,000	30-man Royal Rumble match
April 4	WrestleMania IX	Caesars Palace	Paradise, Nevada	16,891	Yokozuna (c) vs. Hulk Hogan for the WWF Championship
June 13	King of the Ring	Nutter Center	Dayton, Ohio	6,500	Bret Hart vs. Bam Bam Bigelow in the King of the Ring tournament final
August 30	SummerSlam	The Palace of Auburn Hills	Auburn Hills, Michigan	23,954	Yokozuna (c) vs. Lex Luger for the WWF Championship
November 24	Survivor Series	Boston Garden	Boston, Massachusetts	15,509	The All Americans (Lex Luger, The Undertaker, and The Steiner Brothers (Rick Steiner and Scott Steiner)) vs. The Foreign Fanatics (Yokozuna, Ludvig Borga, Jacques Rougeau, and Crush) in a 4-on-4 Survivor Series match

==== 1994 ====
Date	Event	Venue	Location	Attendance	Final match
January 22	Royal Rumble	Providence Civic Center	Providence, Rhode Island	14,500	30-man Royal Rumble match
March 20	WrestleMania X	Madison Square Garden	New York City, New York	18,065	Yokozuna (c) vs. Bret Hart for the WWF Championship
June 19	King of the Ring	Baltimore Arena	Baltimore, Maryland	12,000	Roddy Piper vs. Jerry Lawler
August 29	SummerSlam	United Center	Chicago, Illinois	23,300	The Undertaker vs. "The Undertaker"
November 23	Survivor Series	Freeman Coliseum	San Antonio, Texas	10,001	The Undertaker vs. Yokozuna in a casket match

==== 1995 ====
Date	Event	Venue	Location	Attendance	Final match	Notes
January 22	Royal Rumble	USF Sun Dome	Tampa, Florida	10,000	30-man Royal Rumble match	
April 2	WrestleMania XI	Hartford Civic Center	Hartford, Connecticut	16,305	Lawrence Taylor vs. Bam Bam Bigelow	
May 14	In Your House	Onondaga County War Memorial	Syracuse, New York	7,000	Diesel (c) vs. Sid for the WWF Championship	
June 25	King of the Ring	CoreStates Spectrum	Philadelphia, Pennsylvania	16,590	Diesel and Bam Bam Bigelow vs. The Million Dollar Corporation (Sid and Tatanka) in a tag team match	
July 23	In Your House	Nashville Municipal Auditorium	Nashville, Tennessee	6,482	Diesel (c) vs. Sid in a lumberjack match for the WWF Championship	Sequentially referred to as In Your House 2
August 27	SummerSlam	Civic Arena	Pittsburgh, Pennsylvania	18,062	Diesel (c) vs. King Mabel for the WWF Championship	
September 24	In Your House	Saginaw Civic Center	Saginaw, Michigan	5,146	2 Dudes with Attitudes (Diesel (WWF-c) and Shawn Michaels (Intercontinental-c)) vs. Yokozuna and The British Bulldog (Tag Team-c) in a winners-take-all tag team match for the WWF Championship, WWF Intercontinental Championship, and WWF Tag Team Championship	Sequentially referred to as In Your House 3
October 22	In Your House	Winnipeg Arena	Winnipeg, Manitoba, Canada	10,339	Diesel (c) vs. The British Bulldog for the WWF Championship	Sequentially referred to as In Your House 4
November 19	Survivor Series	USAir Arena	Landover, Maryland	14,500	Diesel (c) vs. Bret Hart in a no countout, no disqualification match for the WWF Championship	
December 17	In Your House	Hersheypark Arena	Hershey, Pennsylvania	7,289	Bret Hart (c) vs. The British Bulldog for the WWF Championship	Sequentially referred to as In Your House 5

==== 1996 ====
Date	Event	Venue	Location	Attendance	Final match	Notes
January 21	Royal Rumble	Selland Arena	Fresno, California	9,600	Bret Hart (c) vs. The Undertaker for the WWF Championship	
February 18	In Your House	Louisville Gardens	Louisville, Kentucky	5,500	Bret Hart (c) vs. Diesel in a steel cage match for the WWF Championship	Sequentially referred to as In Your House 6
March 31	WrestleMania XII	Arrowhead Pond	Anaheim, California	18,853	Bret Hart (c) vs. Shawn Michaels in a 60-minute iron man match for the WWF Championship	
April 28	In Your House: Good Friends, Better Enemies	Omaha Civic Auditorium	Omaha, Nebraska	9,563	Shawn Michaels (c) vs. Diesel in a no holds barred match for the WWF Championship	Sequentially referred to as In Your House 7
May 26	In Your House: Beware of Dog	Florence Civic Center	Florence, South Carolina	6,000	Shawn Michaels (c) vs. The British Bulldog for the WWF Championship	Sequentially referred to as In Your House 8 Rescheduled on May 28 after a blackout
May 28	In Your House: Beware of Dog 2	North Charleston Coliseum	North Charleston, South Carolina	4,500	Goldust (c) vs. The Undertaker in a casket match for the WWF Intercontinental Championship	Sequentially referred to as In Your House 8 Rescheduled on May 28 after a blackout
June 23	King of the Ring	MECCA Arena	Milwaukee, Wisconsin	8,762	Shawn Michaels (c) vs. The British Bulldog for the WWF Championship	
July 21	In Your House: International Incident	General Motors Place	Vancouver, British Columbia, Canada	14,804	Shawn Michaels, Sycho Sid, and Ahmed Johnson vs. Camp Cornette (Vader, The British Bulldog, and Owen Hart) in a six-man tag team match	Sequentially referred to as In Your House 9
August 18	SummerSlam	Gund Arena	Cleveland, Ohio	17,000	Shawn Michaels (c) vs. Vader for the WWF Championship	
September 22	In Your House: Mind Games	CoreStates Center	Philadelphia, Pennsylvania	13,000	Shawn Michaels (c) vs. Mankind for the WWF Championship	Sequentially referred to as In Your House 10
October 20	In Your House: Buried Alive	Market Square Arena	Indianapolis, Indiana	9,649	The Undertaker vs. Mankind in a Buried Alive match	Sequentially referred to as In Your House 11
November 17	Survivor Series	Madison Square Garden	New York City, New York	18,647	Shawn Michaels (c) vs. Sycho Sid for the WWF Championship	
December 15	In Your House: It's Time	West Palm Beach Auditorium	West Palm Beach, Florida	5,708	Sycho Sid (c) vs. Bret Hart for the WWF Championship	Sequentially referred to as In Your House 12

==== 1997 ====
Date	Event	Venue	Location	Attendance	Final match	Notes
January 19	Royal Rumble	Alamodome	San Antonio, Texas	60,477	Sycho Sid (c) vs. Shawn Michaels for the WWF Championship	
February 16	In Your House: Final Four	UTC Arena	Chattanooga, Tennessee	6,399	Bret Hart vs. The Undertaker vs. Stone Cold Steve Austin vs. Vader in a Final Four match for the vacant WWF Championship	Sequentially referred to as In Your House 13
March 23	WrestleMania 13	Rosemont Horizon	Rosemont, Illinois	18,197	Sycho Sid (c) vs. The Undertaker in a no disqualification match for the WWF Championship	
April 20	In Your House: Revenge of the Taker	Blue Cross Arena	Rochester, New York	11,477	Stone Cold Steve Austin vs. Bret Hart	Sequentially referred to as In Your House 14
May 11	In Your House: Cold Day in Hell	Richmond Coliseum	Richmond, Virginia	14,381	The Undertaker (c) vs. Stone Cold Steve Austin for the WWF Championship	Sequentially referred to as In Your House 15
June 8	King of the Ring	Providence Civic Center	Providence, Rhode Island	13,312	The Undertaker (c) vs. Faarooq for the WWF Championship	
July 6	In Your House: Canadian Stampede	Canadian Airlines Saddledome	Calgary, Alberta, Canada	12,151	Stone Cold Steve Austin, Ken Shamrock, Goldust, and The Legion Of Doom (Hawk and Animal) vs. The Hart Foundation (Bret Hart, Owen Hart, The British Bulldog, Jim Neidhart, and Brian Pillman) in a ten-man tag team match	Sequentially referred to as In Your House 16
August 3	SummerSlam	Continental Airlines Arena	East Rutherford, New Jersey	20,213	The Undertaker (c) vs. Bret Hart for the WWF Championship	
September 7	Ground Zero: In Your House	Louisville Gardens	Louisville, Kentucky	4,963	The Undertaker vs. Shawn Michaels	
September 20	One Night Only	NEC Arena	Birmingham, England	11,000	The British Bulldog (c) vs. Shawn Michaels for the WWF European Championship	Aired exclusively in the United Kingdom and Canada
October 5	Badd Blood: In Your House	Kiel Center	St. Louis, Missouri	21,151	The Undertaker vs. Shawn Michaels in a Hell in a Cell match	
November 9	Survivor Series	Molson Centre	Montreal, Quebec, Canada	20,593	Bret Hart (c) vs. Shawn Michaels for the WWF Championship	
December 7	D-Generation X: In Your House	Springfield Civic Center	Springfield, Massachusetts	6,358	Shawn Michaels (c) vs. Ken Shamrock for the WWF Championship	

==== 1998 ====
Date	Event	Venue	Location	Attendance	Final match	Notes
January 18	Royal Rumble	San Jose Arena	San Jose, California	18,542	Shawn Michaels (c) vs. The Undertaker in a casket match for the WWF Championship	
February 15	No Way Out of Texas: In Your House	Compaq Center	Houston, Texas	16,110	Stone Cold Steve Austin, Owen Hart, Cactus Jack, and Chainsaw Charlie vs. Triple H, Savio Vega, and The New Age Outlaws (Road Dogg and Billy Gunn) in a non-sanctioned eight-man tag team match	
March 29	WrestleMania XIV	FleetCenter	Boston, Massachusetts	19,028	Shawn Michaels (c) vs. Stone Cold Steve Austin for the WWF Championship	
April 26	Unforgiven: In Your House	Greensboro Coliseum	Greensboro, North Carolina	21,427	Stone Cold Steve Austin (c) vs. Dude Love for the WWF Championship	
May 31	Over the Edge: In Your House	Wisconsin Center Arena	Milwaukee, Wisconsin	9,822	Stone Cold Steve Austin (c) vs. Dude Love in a no disqualification, falls count anywhere match for the WWF Championship	
June 28	King of the Ring	Civic Arena	Pittsburgh, Pennsylvania	17,087	Stone Cold Steve Austin (c) vs. Kane in a first blood match for the WWF Championship	
July 26	Fully Loaded: In Your House	Selland Arena	Fresno, California	9,855	Kane and Mankind (c) vs. Stone Cold Steve Austin and The Undertaker in a tag team match for the WWF Tag Team Championship	
August 30	SummerSlam	Madison Square Garden	New York City, New York	21,588	Stone Cold Steve Austin (c) vs. The Undertaker for the WWF Championship	
September 27	Breakdown: In Your House	Copps Coliseum	Hamilton, Ontario, Canada	17,405	Stone Cold Steve Austin (c) vs. The Undertaker vs. Kane in a triple threat match for the WWF Championship	
October 18	Judgment Day: In Your House	Rosemont Horizon	Rosemont, Illinois	18,153	The Undertaker vs. Kane for the vacant WWF Championship	
November 15	Survivor Series	Kiel Center	St. Louis, Missouri	21,179	The Rock vs. Mankind for the vacant WWF Championship	
December 6	Capital Carnage	London Arena	London, England	10,441	Stone Cold Steve Austin vs. Mankind vs. Kane vs. The Undertaker in a fatal four-way match	Aired exclusively in the United Kingdom
December 13	Rock Bottom: In Your House	General Motors Place	Vancouver, British Columbia, Canada	20,042	Stone Cold Steve Austin vs. The Undertaker in a Buried Alive match	

==== 1999 ====
Date	Event	Venue	Location	Attendance	Final match	Notes
January 24	Royal Rumble	Arrowhead Pond of Anaheim	Anaheim, California	14,816	30-man Royal Rumble match	
February 14	St. Valentine's Day Massacre: In Your House	Memphis Pyramid	Memphis, Tennessee	19,028	Stone Cold Steve Austin vs. Mr. McMahon in a steel cage match	
March 28	WrestleMania XV	First Union Center	Philadelphia, Pennsylvania	20,276	The Rock (c) vs. Stone Cold Steve Austin in a no disqualification match for the WWF Championship	
April 25	Backlash	Providence Civic Center	Providence, Rhode Island	10,939	Stone Cold Steve Austin (c) vs. The Rock in a no holds barred match for the WWF Championship	
May 16	No Mercy	Manchester Evening News Arena	Manchester, England	18,107	Stone Cold Steve Austin (c) vs. The Undertaker vs. Triple H in a triple threat no holds barred match for the WWF Championship	Aired exclusively in the United Kingdom Retroactively known as No Mercy UK
May 23	Over the Edge	Kemper Arena	Kansas City, Missouri	16,472	Stone Cold Steve Austin (c) vs. The Undertaker for the WWF Championship	
June 27	King of the Ring	Greensboro Coliseum	Greensboro, North Carolina	20,108	Stone Cold Steve Austin vs. The Corporate Ministry (Mr. McMahon and Shane McMahon) in a 1-on-2 handicap ladder match	
July 25	Fully Loaded	Marine Midland Arena	Buffalo, New York	16,605	Stone Cold Steve Austin (c) vs. The Undertaker in a first blood match for the WWF Championship	
August 22	SummerSlam	Target Center	Minneapolis, Minnesota	17,370	Stone Cold Steve Austin (c) vs. Mankind vs. Triple H in a triple threat match for the WWF Championship	
September 26	Unforgiven	Charlotte Coliseum	Charlotte, North Carolina	15,779	The Rock vs. Mankind vs. Kane vs. Triple H vs. Big Show vs. The British Bulldog in a six-pack challenge match for the vacant WWF Championship	
October 2	Rebellion	National Indoor Arena	Birmingham, England	13,500	Triple H (c) vs. The Rock in a steel cage match for the WWF Championship	Aired exclusively in the United Kingdom
October 17	No Mercy	Gund Arena	Cleveland, Ohio	18,742	Triple H (c) vs. Stone Cold Steve Austin in a no holds barred match for the WWF Championship	Retroactively known as No Mercy Cleveland
November 14	Survivor Series	Joe Louis Arena	Detroit, Michigan	18,735	Triple H (c) vs. The Rock vs. Big Show in a triple threat match for the WWF Championship	
December 12	Armageddon	National Car Rental Center	Sunrise, Florida	17,054	Vince McMahon vs. Triple H in a no holds barred, falls count anywhere match	

=== 2000s ===
==== 2000 ====
Date	Event	Venue	Location	Attendance	Final match	Notes
January 23	Royal Rumble	Madison Square Garden	New York City, New York	19,231	30-person Royal Rumble match	
February 27	No Way Out	Hartford Civic Center	Hartford, Connecticut	12,551	Triple H (c) vs. Cactus Jack in a Hell in a Cell match for the WWF Championship	
April 2	WrestleMania 2000	Arrowhead Pond of Anaheim	Anaheim, California	19,776	Triple H (c) vs. The Rock vs. Mick Foley vs. Big Show in a fatal four-way elimination match for the WWF Championship	
April 30	Backlash	MCI Center	Washington, D.C.	19,101	Triple H (c) vs. The Rock for the WWF Championship	
May 6	Insurrextion	Earls Court Exhibition Centre	London, England	17,000	The Rock (c) vs. Triple H vs. Shane McMahon in a triple threat match for the WWF Championship	Aired exclusively in the United Kingdom
May 21	Judgment Day	Freedom Hall	Louisville, Kentucky	16,827	The Rock (c) vs. Triple H in a 60-minute iron man match for the WWF Championship	
June 25	King of the Ring	FleetCenter	Boston, Massachusetts	17,651	The McMahon-Helmsley Faction (Triple H (c), Mr. McMahon, and Shane McMahon) vs. The Rock, The Undertaker, and Kane in a six-man tag team match for the WWF Championship	
July 23	Fully Loaded	Reunion Arena	Dallas, Texas	16,504	The Rock (c) vs. Chris Benoit for the WWF Championship	
August 27	SummerSlam	Raleigh Entertainment and Sports Arena	Raleigh, North Carolina	18,000	The Rock (c) vs. Triple H vs. Kurt Angle in a triple threat match for the WWF Championship	
September 24	Unforgiven	First Union Center	Philadelphia, Pennsylvania	18,092	The Rock (c) vs. The Undertaker vs. Chris Benoit vs. Kane in a fatal four-way match for the WWF Championship	
October 22	No Mercy	Pepsi Arena	Albany, New York	14,342	The Rock (c) vs. Kurt Angle in a no disqualification match for the WWF Championship	
November 19	Survivor Series	Ice Palace	Tampa, Florida	18,602	Stone Cold Steve Austin vs. Triple H in a no disqualification match	
December 2	Rebellion	Sheffield Arena	Sheffield, England	11,077	Kurt Angle (c) vs. Stone Cold Steve Austin vs. The Rock vs. Rikishi in a fatal four-way match for the WWF Championship	Aired exclusively in the United Kingdom
December 10	Armageddon	Birmingham–Jefferson Civic Center	Birmingham, Alabama	14,920	Kurt Angle (c) vs. Stone Cold Steve Austin vs. The Rock vs. The Undertaker vs. Triple H vs. Rikishi in a six-man Hell in a Cell match for the WWF Championship	

==== 2001 ====
Date	Event	Venue	Location	Attendance	Final match	Notes
January 21	Royal Rumble	New Orleans Arena	New Orleans, Louisiana	17,137	30-man Royal Rumble match	
February 25	No Way Out	Thomas & Mack Center	Paradise, Nevada	15,223	Kurt Angle (c) vs. The Rock for the WWF Championship	
April 1	WrestleMania X-Seven	Reliant Astrodome	Houston, Texas	67,925	The Rock (c) vs. Stone Cold Steve Austin in a no disqualification match for the WWF Championship	
April 29	Backlash	Allstate Arena	Rosemont, Illinois	15,592	The Two Man Power Trip (Stone Cold Steve Austin (WWF-c) and Triple H (IC-c)) vs. The Brothers of Destruction (The Undertaker and Kane) (Tag-c) in a winners take all tag team match for the WWF Championship, WWF Intercontinental Championship, and WWF Tag Team Championship	
May 5	Insurrextion	Earls Court Exhibition Centre	London, England	16,284	The Two Man Power Trip (Stone Cold Steve Austin (c) and Triple H) vs. The Undertaker in a 2-on-1 handicap match for the WWF Championship	Aired exclusively in the United Kingdom
May 20	Judgment Day	ARCO Arena	Sacramento, California	13,623	Stone Cold Steve Austin (c) vs. The Undertaker in a no holds barred match for the WWF Championship	
June 24	King of the Ring	Continental Airlines Arena	East Rutherford, New Jersey	17,777	Stone Cold Steve Austin (c) vs. Chris Jericho vs. Chris Benoit in a triple threat match for the WWF Championship	
July 22	Invasion	Gund Arena	Cleveland, Ohio	17,019	Team WWF (Stone Cold Steve Austin, Chris Jericho, Kurt Angle, and The Brothers of Destruction (The Undertaker and Kane)) vs. The WCW-ECW Coalition (Booker T, Diamond Dallas Page, Rhyno, and The Dudley Boyz (Bubba Ray Dudley and D-Von Dudley)) in a ten-man tag team match	
August 19	SummerSlam	Compaq Center	San Jose, California	15,293	Booker T (c) vs. The Rock for the WCW Championship	
September 23	Unforgiven	Mellon Arena	Pittsburgh, Pennsylvania	13,855	Stone Cold Steve Austin (c) vs. Kurt Angle for the WWF Championship	
October 21	No Mercy	Savvis Center	St. Louis, Missouri	15,647	Stone Cold Steve Austin (c) vs. Kurt Angle vs. Rob Van Dam in a triple threat match for the WWF Championship	
November 3	Rebellion	Manchester Evening News Arena	Manchester, England	15,612	Stone Cold Steve Austin (c) vs. The Rock for the WWF Championship	Aired exclusively in the United Kingdom
November 18	Survivor Series	Greensboro Coliseum	Greensboro, North Carolina	10,142	Team WWF (The Rock, Chris Jericho, The Brothers of Destruction (The Undertaker and Kane), and Big Show) vs. Team Alliance (Stone Cold Steve Austin, Kurt Angle, Rob Van Dam, Booker T, and Shane McMahon) in a 5-on-5 Survivor Series match	
December 9	Vengeance	San Diego Sports Arena	San Diego, California	11,800	Stone Cold Steve Austin (WWF-c) vs. Chris Jericho (World-c) in a unification match to unify the WWF Championship and the World Championship into the Undisputed WWF Championship	

==== 2002 ====
Raw-branded event	SmackDown-branded event

Date	Event	Venue	Location	Attendance	Final match	Notes
January 20	Royal Rumble	Philips Arena	Atlanta, Georgia	16,106	30-man Royal Rumble match	
February 17	No Way Out	Bradley Center	Milwaukee, Wisconsin	15,291	Chris Jericho (c) vs. Stone Cold Steve Austin for the Undisputed WWF Championship	
March 17	WrestleMania X8	SkyDome	Toronto, Ontario, Canada	68,237	Chris Jericho (c) vs. Triple H for the Undisputed WWF Championship	
April 21	Backlash	Kemper Arena	Kansas City, Missouri	12,489	Triple H (c) vs. Hollywood Hulk Hogan for the Undisputed WWF Championship	
May 4	Insurrextion	Wembley Arena	London, England	9,308	Triple H vs. The Undertaker	Aired exclusively in the United Kingdom
May 19	Judgment Day	Gaylord Entertainment Center	Nashville, Tennessee	14,521	Hollywood Hulk Hogan (c) vs. The Undertaker for the WWE Undisputed Championship	
June 23	King of the Ring	Nationwide Arena	Columbus, Ohio	14,198	The Undertaker (c) vs. Triple H for the WWE Undisputed Championship	
July 21	Vengeance	Joe Louis Arena	Detroit, Michigan	12,000	The Undertaker (c) vs. The Rock vs. Kurt Angle in a triple threat match for the WWE Undisputed Championship	
August 25	SummerSlam	Nassau Veterans Memorial Coliseum	Uniondale, New York	14,797	The Rock (c) vs. Brock Lesnar for the WWE Undisputed Championship	
September 22	Unforgiven	Staples Center	Los Angeles, California	16,000	Brock Lesnar (c) vs. The Undertaker for the WWE Championship	
October 20	No Mercy	Alltel Arena	North Little Rock, Arkansas	10,000	Brock Lesnar (c) vs. The Undertaker in a Hell in a Cell match for the WWE Championship	
October 26	Rebellion	Manchester Evening News Arena	Manchester, England	13,416	Brock Lesnar (c) and Paul Heyman vs. Edge in a 2-on-1 handicap match for the WWE Championship	Aired exclusively in the United Kingdom
November 17	Survivor Series	Madison Square Garden	New York City, New York	17,930	Triple H (c) vs. Shawn Michaels vs. Rob Van Dam vs. Kane vs. Booker T vs. Chris Jericho in a six-man Elimination Chamber match for the World Heavyweight Championship	
December 15	Armageddon	Office Depot Center	Sunrise, Florida	9,000	Shawn Michaels (c) vs. Triple H in a Three Stages of Hell match (street fight, steel cage match, and ladder match) for the World Heavyweight Championship	

==== 2003 ====
Raw-branded event	SmackDown-branded event

Date	Event	Venue	Location	Attendance	Final match	Notes
January 19	Royal Rumble	Fleet Center	Boston, Massachusetts	15,338	30-man Royal Rumble match	
February 23	No Way Out	Bell Centre	Montreal, Quebec, Canada	15,100	Hulk Hogan vs. The Rock	
March 30	WrestleMania XIX	Safeco Field	Seattle, Washington	54,097	Kurt Angle (c) vs. Brock Lesnar for the WWE Championship	
April 27	Backlash	Worcester Centrum	Worcester, Massachusetts	10,000	Goldberg vs. The Rock	
May 18	Judgment Day	Charlotte Coliseum	Charlotte, North Carolina	13,000	Brock Lesnar (c) vs. Big Show in a stretcher match for the WWE Championship	
June 7	Insurrextion	Telewest Arena	Newcastle upon Tyne, England	10,000	Triple H (c) vs. Kevin Nash in a street fight for the World Heavyweight Championship	Aired exclusively in the United Kingdom
June 15	Bad Blood	Compaq Center	Houston, Texas	10,000	Triple H (c) vs. Kevin Nash in a Hell in a Cell match for the World Heavyweight Championship	
July 27	Vengeance	Pepsi Center	Denver, Colorado	9,500	Brock Lesnar (c) vs. Kurt Angle vs. Big Show in a triple threat match for the WWE Championship	
August 24	SummerSlam	America West Arena	Phoenix, Arizona	16,113	Triple H (c) vs. Goldberg vs. Shawn Michaels vs. Kevin Nash vs. Chris Jericho vs. Randy Orton in a six-man Elimination Chamber match for the World Heavyweight Championship	
September 21	Unforgiven	Giant Center	Hershey, Pennsylvania	10,347	Triple H (c) vs. Goldberg for the World Heavyweight Championship	
October 19	No Mercy	1st Mariner Arena	Baltimore, Maryland	8,500	Brock Lesnar (c) vs. The Undertaker in a biker chain match for the WWE Championship	
November 16	Survivor Series	American Airlines Center	Dallas, Texas	13,487	Goldberg (c) vs. Triple H for the World Heavyweight Championship	
December 14	Armageddon	TD Waterhouse Center	Orlando, Florida	12,672	Goldberg (c) vs. Triple H vs. Kane in a triple threat match for the World Heavyweight Championship	

==== 2004 ====
Raw-branded event	SmackDown-branded event

Date	Event	Venue	Location	Attendance	Final match
January 25	Royal Rumble	Wachovia Center	Philadelphia, Pennsylvania	17,289	30-man Royal Rumble match
February 15	No Way Out	Cow Palace	Daly City, California	11,000	Brock Lesnar (c) vs. Eddie Guerrero for the WWE Championship
March 14	WrestleMania XX	Madison Square Garden	New York City, New York	20,000	Triple H (c) vs. Chris Benoit vs. Shawn Michaels in a triple threat match for the World Heavyweight Championship
April 18	Backlash	Rexall Place	Edmonton, Alberta, Canada	13,000	Chris Benoit (c) vs. Shawn Michaels vs. Triple H in a triple threat match for the World Heavyweight Championship
May 16	Judgment Day	Staples Center	Los Angeles, California	18,722	Eddie Guerrero (c) vs. John Bradshaw Layfield for the WWE Championship
June 13	Bad Blood	Nationwide Arena	Columbus, Ohio	9,000	Shawn Michaels vs. Triple H in a Hell in a Cell match
June 27	The Great American Bash	Norfolk Scope	Norfolk, Virginia	6,500	The Undertaker vs. The Dudley Boyz (Bubba Ray Dudley and D-Von Dudley) in a 2-on-1 handicap concrete crypt match
July 11	Vengeance	Hartford Civic Center	Hartford, Connecticut	7,000	Chris Benoit (c) vs. Triple H for the World Heavyweight Championship
August 15	SummerSlam	Air Canada Centre	Toronto, Ontario, Canada	17,640	Chris Benoit (c) vs. Randy Orton for the World Heavyweight Championship
September 12	Unforgiven	Rose Garden Arena	Portland, Oregon	10,000	Randy Orton (c) vs. Triple H for the World Heavyweight Championship
October 3	No Mercy	Continental Airlines Arena	East Rutherford, New Jersey	10,000	John Bradshaw Layfield (c) vs. The Undertaker in a last ride match for the WWE Championship
October 19	Taboo Tuesday	Bradley Center	Milwaukee, Wisconsin	3,500	Randy Orton vs. Ric Flair in a steel cage match
November 14	Survivor Series	Gund Arena	Cleveland, Ohio	7,500	Randy Orton, Chris Benoit, Chris Jericho, and Maven vs. Evolution (Triple H and Batista), Edge, and Gene Snitsky in a 4-on-4 Survivor Series match
December 12	Armageddon	Gwinnett Arena	Duluth, Georgia	5,000	John Bradshaw Layfield (c) vs. The Undertaker vs. Eddie Guerrero vs. Booker T in a fatal four-way match for the WWE Championship

==== 2005 ====
Raw-branded event	SmackDown-branded event

Date	Event	Venue	Location	Attendance	Final match
January 9	New Year's Revolution	Coliseo de Puerto Rico	San Juan, Puerto Rico	15,764	Randy Orton vs. Chris Benoit vs. Chris Jericho vs. Triple H vs. Batista vs. Edge in a six-man Elimination Chamber match for the vacant World Heavyweight Championship
January 30	Royal Rumble	Save Mart Center	Fresno, California	12,000	30-man Royal Rumble match
February 20	No Way Out	Mellon Arena	Pittsburgh, Pennsylvania	9,500	John Bradshaw Layfield (c) vs. Big Show in a barbed wire steel cage match for the WWE Championship
April 3	WrestleMania 21	Staples Center	Los Angeles, California	20,193	Triple H (c) vs. Batista for the World Heavyweight Championship
May 1	Backlash	Verizon Wireless Arena	Manchester, New Hampshire	14,000	Batista (c) vs. Triple H for the World Heavyweight Championship
May 22	Judgment Day	Target Center	Minneapolis, Minnesota	12,000	John Cena (c) vs. John Bradshaw Layfield in an "I quit" match for the WWE Championship
June 12	ECW One Night Stand	Hammerstein Ballroom	New York City, New York	2,500	Tommy Dreamer and The Sandman vs. The Dudley Boyz (Bubba Ray Dudley and D-Von Dudley) in a tag team match
June 26	Vengeance	Thomas & Mack Center	Paradise, Nevada	9,850	Batista (c) vs. Triple H in a Hell in a Cell match for the World Heavyweight Championship
July 24	The Great American Bash	HSBC Arena	Buffalo, New York	8,000	Batista (c) vs. John Bradshaw Layfield for the World Heavyweight Championship
August 21	SummerSlam	MCI Center	Washington, D.C.	18,176	Hulk Hogan vs. Shawn Michaels
September 18	Unforgiven	Ford Center	Oklahoma City, Oklahoma	8,000	John Cena (c) vs. Kurt Angle for the WWE Championship
October 9	No Mercy	Toyota Center	Houston, Texas	7,000	Batista (c) vs. Eddie Guerrero for the World Heavyweight Championship
November 1	Taboo Tuesday	iPayOne Center	San Diego, California	6,000	John Cena (c) vs. Shawn Michaels vs. Kurt Angle in a triple threat match for the WWE Championship
November 27	Survivor Series	Joe Louis Arena	Detroit, Michigan	15,000	Team Raw (Shawn Michaels, Big Show, Kane, Carlito, and Chris Masters) vs. Team SmackDown (Batista, Rey Mysterio, Bobby Lashley, Randy Orton, and John Bradshaw Layfield) in a 5-on-5 Survivor Series match
December 18	Armageddon	Dunkin' Donuts Center	Providence, Rhode Island	8,000	The Undertaker vs. Randy Orton in a Hell in a Cell match

==== 2006 ====
Raw-branded event	SmackDown-branded event	ECW-branded event

Date	Event	Venue	Location	Attendance	Final match
January 8	New Year's Revolution	Pepsi Arena	Albany, New York	11,000	John Cena (c) vs. Edge for the WWE Championship
January 29	Royal Rumble	American Airlines Arena	Miami, Florida	16,000	Kurt Angle (c) vs. Mark Henry for the World Heavyweight Championship
February 19	No Way Out	1st Mariner Arena	Baltimore, Maryland	11,000	Kurt Angle (c) vs. The Undertaker for the World Heavyweight Championship
April 2	WrestleMania 22	Allstate Arena	Rosemont, Illinois	17,155	John Cena (c) vs. Triple H for the WWE Championship
April 30	Backlash	Rupp Arena	Lexington, Kentucky	14,000	John Cena (c) vs. Triple H vs. Edge in a triple threat match for the WWE Championship
May 21	Judgment Day	US Airways Center	Phoenix, Arizona	14,000	Rey Mysterio (c) vs. John Bradshaw Layfield for the World Heavyweight Championship
June 11	ECW One Night Stand	Hammerstein Ballroom	New York City, New York	2,460	John Cena (c) vs. Rob Van Dam in an Extreme Rules match for the WWE Championship
June 25	Vengeance	Charlotte Bobcats Arena	Charlotte, North Carolina	6,800	D-Generation X (Triple H and Shawn Michaels) vs. The Spirit Squad (Kenny, Johnny, Mitch, Nicky, and Mikey) in a 2-on-5 handicap match
July 23	The Great American Bash	Conseco Fieldhouse	Indianapolis, Indiana	9,750	Rey Mysterio (c) vs. King Booker for the World Heavyweight Championship
August 20	SummerSlam	TD Banknorth Garden	Boston, Massachusetts	16,168	Edge (c) vs. John Cena for the WWE Championship
September 17	Unforgiven	Air Canada Centre	Toronto, Ontario, Canada	16,105	Edge (c) vs. John Cena in a Tables, Ladders, and Chairs match for the WWE Championship
October 8	No Mercy	RBC Center	Raleigh, North Carolina	9,000	King Booker (c) vs. Batista vs. Bobby Lashley vs. Finlay in a fatal four-way match for the World Heavyweight Championship
November 5	Cyber Sunday	U.S. Bank Arena	Cincinnati, Ohio	7,000	King Booker (c) vs. John Cena vs. Big Show in a triple threat match for the World Heavyweight Championship
November 26	Survivor Series	Wachovia Center	Philadelphia, Pennsylvania	15,400	King Booker (c) vs. Batista for the World Heavyweight Championship
December 3	December to Dismember	James Brown Arena	Augusta, Georgia	4,800	Big Show (c) vs. Rob Van Dam vs. Bobby Lashley vs. CM Punk vs. Test vs. Hardcore Holly in a six-man extreme Elimination Chamber match for the ECW World Championship
December 17	Armageddon	Richmond Coliseum	Richmond, Virginia	8,200	Batista and John Cena vs. King Booker and Finlay in a tag team match

==== 2007 ====
Raw-branded event	SmackDown-branded event

Date	Event	Venue	Location	Attendance	Final match
January 7	New Year's Revolution	Kemper Arena	Kansas City, Missouri	10,000	John Cena (c) vs. Umaga for the WWE Championship
January 28	Royal Rumble	AT&T Center	San Antonio, Texas	13,500	30-man Royal Rumble match
February 18	No Way Out	Staples Center	Los Angeles, California	14,000	Batista and The Undertaker vs. John Cena and Shawn Michaels in a tag team match
April 1	WrestleMania 23	Ford Field	Detroit, Michigan	74,287	John Cena (c) vs. Shawn Michaels for the WWE Championship
April 29	Backlash	Philips Arena	Atlanta, Georgia	14,500	John Cena (c) vs. Shawn Michaels vs. Edge vs. Randy Orton in a fatal four-way match for the WWE Championship
May 20	Judgment Day	Scottrade Center	St. Louis, Missouri	10,500	John Cena (c) vs. The Great Khali for the WWE Championship
June 3	One Night Stand	Jacksonville Veterans Memorial Arena	Jacksonville, Florida	7,000	John Cena (c) vs. The Great Khali in a falls count anywhere match for the WWE Championship
June 24	Vengeance: Night of Champions	Toyota Center	Houston, Texas	15,000	John Cena (c) vs. Bobby Lashley vs. Mick Foley vs. Randy Orton vs. King Booker in a five-man match for the WWE Championship
July 22	The Great American Bash	HP Pavilion	San Jose, California	13,034	John Cena (c) vs. Bobby Lashley for the WWE Championship
August 26	SummerSlam	Continental Airlines Arena	East Rutherford, New Jersey	17,441	John Cena (c) vs. Randy Orton for the WWE Championship
September 16	Unforgiven	FedExForum	Memphis, Tennessee	12,000	The Undertaker vs. Mark Henry
October 7	No Mercy	Allstate Arena	Rosemont, Illinois	12,500	Triple H (c) vs. Randy Orton in a last man standing match for the WWE Championship
October 28	Cyber Sunday	Verizon Center	Washington, D.C.	10,094	Batista (c) vs. The Undertaker for the World Heavyweight Championship
November 18	Survivor Series	American Airlines Arena	Miami, Florida	12,500	Batista (c) vs. The Undertaker in a Hell in a Cell match for the World Heavyweight Championship
December 16	Armageddon	Mellon Arena	Pittsburgh, Pennsylvania	12,500	Batista (c) vs. The Undertaker vs. Edge in a triple threat match for the World Heavyweight Championship

==== 2008 ====
Date	Event	Venue	Location	Attendance	Final match
January 27	Royal Rumble	Madison Square Garden	New York City, New York	20,798	30-man Royal Rumble match
February 17	No Way Out	Thomas & Mack Center	Paradise, Nevada	15,240	Triple H vs. Shawn Michaels vs. Jeff Hardy vs. Chris Jericho vs. John Bradshaw Layfield vs. Umaga in a six-man Elimination Chamber match
March 30	WrestleMania XXIV	Florida Citrus Bowl	Orlando, Florida	74,635	Edge (c) vs. The Undertaker for the World Heavyweight Championship
April 27	Backlash	1st Mariner Arena	Baltimore, Maryland	11,277	Randy Orton (c) vs. John Cena vs. Triple H vs. John Bradshaw Layfield in a fatal four-way elimination match for the WWE Championship
May 18	Judgment Day	Qwest Center Omaha	Omaha, Nebraska	11,324	Triple H (c) vs. Randy Orton in a steel cage match for the WWE Championship
June 1	One Night Stand	San Diego Sports Arena	San Diego, California	9,961	The Undertaker vs. Edge in a Tables, Ladders, and Chairs match for the vacant World Heavyweight Championship
June 29	Night of Champions	American Airlines Center	Dallas, Texas	16,151	Triple H (c) vs. John Cena for the WWE Championship
July 20	The Great American Bash	Nassau Veterans Memorial Coliseum	Uniondale, New York	12,454	Triple H (c) vs. Edge for the WWE Championship
August 17	SummerSlam	Conseco Fieldhouse	Indianapolis, Indiana	15,997	The Undertaker vs. Edge in a Hell in a Cell match
September 7	Unforgiven	Quicken Loans Arena	Cleveland, Ohio	8,707	Batista vs. Rey Mysterio vs. John Bradshaw Layfield vs. Kane vs. Chris Jericho in a five-man championship scramble match for the vacant World Heavyweight Championship
October 5	No Mercy	Rose Garden Arena	Portland, Oregon	9,527	Chris Jericho (c) vs. Shawn Michaels in a ladder match for the World Heavyweight Championship
October 26	Cyber Sunday	US Airways Center	Phoenix, Arizona	7,981	Chris Jericho (c) vs. Batista for the World Heavyweight Championship
November 23	Survivor Series	TD Banknorth Garden	Boston, Massachusetts	12,498	Chris Jericho (c) vs. John Cena for the World Heavyweight Championship
December 14	Armageddon	HSBC Arena	Buffalo, New York	12,500	Edge (c) vs. Triple H vs. Jeff Hardy in a triple threat match for the WWE Championship

==== 2009 ====
Date	Event	Venue	Location	Attendance	Final match
January 25	Royal Rumble	Joe Louis Arena	Detroit, Michigan	16,685	30-man Royal Rumble match
February 15	No Way Out	KeyArena	Seattle, Washington	11,200	John Cena (c) vs. Rey Mysterio vs. Chris Jericho vs. Kane vs. Mike Knox vs. Edge in a six-man Elimination Chamber match for the World Heavyweight Championship
April 5	WrestleMania 25	Reliant Stadium	Houston, Texas	72,744	Triple H (c) vs. Randy Orton for the WWE Championship
April 26	Backlash	Dunkin' Donuts Center	Providence, Rhode Island	8,357	John Cena (c) vs. Edge in a last man standing match for the World Heavyweight Championship
May 17	Judgment Day	Allstate Arena	Rosemont, Illinois	14,822	Edge (c) vs. Jeff Hardy for the World Heavyweight Championship
June 7	Extreme Rules	New Orleans Arena	New Orleans, Louisiana	9,124	Jeff Hardy (c) vs. CM Punk for the World Heavyweight Championship
June 28	The Bash	ARCO Arena	Sacramento, California	11,946	Randy Orton (c) vs. Triple H in a Three Stages of Hell match (singles match, falls count anywhere match, and stretcher match) for the WWE Championship
July 26	Night of Champions	Wachovia Center	Philadelphia, Pennsylvania	17,774	CM Punk (c) vs. Jeff Hardy for the World Heavyweight Championship
August 23	SummerSlam	Staples Center	Los Angeles, California	14,116	Jeff Hardy (c) vs. CM Punk in a Tables, Ladders, and Chairs match for the World Heavyweight Championship
September 13	Breaking Point	Bell Centre	Montreal, Quebec, Canada	12,000	CM Punk (c) vs. The Undertaker in a submission match for the World Heavyweight Championship
October 4	Hell in a Cell	Prudential Center	Newark, New Jersey	12,356	D-Generation X (Triple H and Shawn Michaels) vs. The Legacy (Cody Rhodes and Ted DiBiase) in a tag team Hell in a Cell match
October 25	Bragging Rights	Mellon Arena	Pittsburgh, Pennsylvania	13,562	Randy Orton (c) vs. John Cena in an anything goes, 60-minute iron man match for the WWE Championship
November 22	Survivor Series	Verizon Center	Washington, D.C.	12,500	John Cena (c) vs. Triple H vs. Shawn Michaels in a triple threat match for the WWE Championship
December 13	TLC: Tables, Ladders & Chairs	AT&T Center	San Antonio, Texas	15,226	Jeri-Show (Chris Jericho and Big Show) (c) vs. D-Generation X (Triple H and Shawn Michaels) in a tag team Tables, Ladders, and Chairs match for the Unified WWE Tag Team Championship

=== 2010s ===
==== 2010 ====
Date	Event	Venue	Location	Attendance	Final match
January 31	Royal Rumble	Philips Arena	Atlanta, Georgia	16,697	30-person Royal Rumble match
February 21	Elimination Chamber	Scottrade Center	St. Louis, Missouri	17,000	The Undertaker (c) vs. Rey Mysterio vs. John Morrison vs. R-Truth vs. Chris Jericho vs. CM Punk in a six-man Elimination Chamber match for the World Heavyweight Championship
March 28	WrestleMania XXVI	University of Phoenix Stadium	Glendale, Arizona	72,219	The Undertaker vs. Shawn Michaels in a no countout, no disqualification match
April 25	Extreme Rules	1st Mariner Arena	Baltimore, Maryland	12,278	John Cena (c) vs. Batista in a last man standing match for the WWE Championship
May 23	Over the Limit	Joe Louis Arena	Detroit, Michigan	11,000	John Cena (c) vs. Batista in an "I quit" match for the WWE Championship
June 20	Fatal 4-Way	Nassau Veterans Memorial Coliseum	Uniondale, New York	10,000	John Cena (c) vs. Randy Orton vs. Edge vs. Sheamus in a fatal four-way match for the WWE Championship
July 18	Money in the Bank	Sprint Center	Kansas City, Missouri	8,000	Sheamus (c) vs. John Cena in a steel cage match for the WWE Championship
August 15	SummerSlam	Staples Center	Los Angeles, California	17,463	Team WWE (John Cena, Edge, Chris Jericho, Bret Hart, John Morrison, R-Truth, and Daniel Bryan) vs. The Nexus (Wade Barrett, David Otunga, Heath Slater, Justin Gabriel, Skip Sheffield, Darren Young, and Michael Tarver) in a 14-man tag team elimination match
September 19	Night of Champions	Allstate Arena	Rosemont, Illinois	13,851	Sheamus (c) vs. John Cena vs. Randy Orton vs. Edge vs. Chris Jericho vs. Wade Barrett in a six-pack elimination challenge match for the WWE Championship
October 3	Hell in a Cell	American Airlines Center	Dallas, Texas	7,500	Kane (c) vs. The Undertaker in a Hell in a Cell match for the World Heavyweight Championship
October 24	Bragging Rights	Target Center	Minneapolis, Minnesota	9,000	Randy Orton (c) vs. Wade Barrett for the WWE Championship
November 21	Survivor Series	American Airlines Arena	Miami, Florida	8,000	Randy Orton (c) vs. Wade Barrett in a no countout, no disqualification match for the WWE Championship
December 19	TLC: Tables, Ladders & Chairs	Toyota Center	Houston, Texas	11,500	John Cena vs. Wade Barrett in a chairs match

==== 2011 ====
Date	Event	Venue	Location	Attendance	Final match
January 30	Royal Rumble	TD Garden	Boston, Massachusetts	15,113	40-man Royal Rumble match
February 20	Elimination Chamber	Oracle Arena	Oakland, California	11,500	John Cena vs. Randy Orton vs. John Morrison vs. R-Truth vs. CM Punk vs. King Sheamus in a six-man Elimination Chamber match
April 3	WrestleMania XXVII	Georgia Dome	Atlanta, Georgia	71,617	The Miz (c) vs. John Cena for the WWE Championship
May 1	Extreme Rules	St. Pete Times Forum	Tampa, Florida	10,000	The Miz (c) vs. John Cena vs. John Morrison in a triple threat steel cage match for the WWE Championship
May 22	Over the Limit	KeyArena	Seattle, Washington	7,500	John Cena (c) vs. The Miz in an "I quit" match for the WWE Championship
June 19	Capitol Punishment	Verizon Center	Washington, D.C.	9,850	John Cena (c) vs. R-Truth for the WWE Championship
July 17	Money in the Bank	Allstate Arena	Rosemont, Illinois	14,815	John Cena (c) vs. CM Punk for the WWE Championship
August 14	SummerSlam	Staples Center	Los Angeles, California	17,404	CM Punk (c) vs. Alberto Del Rio for the WWE Championship
September 18	Night of Champions	First Niagara Center	Buffalo, New York	11,000	CM Punk vs. Triple H in a no disqualification match
October 2	Hell in a Cell	New Orleans Arena	New Orleans, Louisiana	9,400	John Cena (c) vs. CM Punk vs. Alberto Del Rio in a triple threat Hell in a Cell match for the WWE Championship
October 23	Vengeance	AT&T Center	San Antonio, Texas	8,000	Alberto Del Rio (c) vs. John Cena in a last man standing match for the WWE Championship
November 20	Survivor Series	Madison Square Garden	New York City, New York	16,749	The Rock and John Cena vs. The Awesome Truth (The Miz and R-Truth) in a tag team match
December 18	TLC: Tables, Ladders & Chairs	1st Mariner Arena	Baltimore, Maryland	9,000	CM Punk (c) vs. Alberto Del Rio vs. The Miz in a triple threat Tables, Ladders, and Chairs match for the WWE Championship

==== 2012 ====
Date	Event	Venue	Location	Attendance	Final match
January 29	Royal Rumble	Scottrade Center	St. Louis, Missouri	18,121	30-person Royal Rumble match
February 19	Elimination Chamber	Bradley Center	Milwaukee, Wisconsin	15,306	John Cena vs. Kane in an ambulance match
April 1	WrestleMania XXVIII	Sun Life Stadium	Miami Gardens, Florida	78,363	The Rock vs. John Cena
April 29	Extreme Rules	Allstate Arena	Rosemont, Illinois	14,817	John Cena vs. Brock Lesnar in an Extreme Rules match
May 20	Over the Limit	PNC Arena	Raleigh, North Carolina	8,000	John Cena vs. John Laurinaitis in a no countout, no disqualification match
June 17	No Way Out	Izod Center	East Rutherford, New Jersey	10,001	John Cena vs. Big Show in a steel cage match
July 15	Money in the Bank	US Airways Center	Phoenix, Arizona	9,000	John Cena vs. Kane vs. Big Show vs. Chris Jericho vs. The Miz in a five-man Money in the Bank ladder match
August 19	SummerSlam	Staples Center	Los Angeles, California	17,482	Triple H vs. Brock Lesnar
September 16	Night of Champions	TD Garden	Boston, Massachusetts	14,886	CM Punk (c) vs. John Cena for the WWE Championship
October 28	Hell in a Cell	Philips Arena	Atlanta, Georgia	10,000	CM Punk (c) vs. Ryback in a Hell in a Cell match for the WWE Championship
November 18	Survivor Series	Bankers Life Fieldhouse	Indianapolis, Indiana	8,500	CM Punk (c) vs. John Cena vs. Ryback in a triple threat match for the WWE Championship
December 16	TLC: Tables, Ladders & Chairs	Barclays Center	Brooklyn, New York	15,748	Dolph Ziggler (contract holder) vs. John Cena in a ladder match for the Money in the Bank contract

==== 2013 ====
Date	Event	Venue	Location	Attendance	Final match
January 27	Royal Rumble	US Airways Center	Phoenix, Arizona	15,103	CM Punk (c) vs. The Rock for the WWE Championship
February 17	Elimination Chamber	New Orleans Arena	New Orleans, Louisiana	13,000	The Rock (c) vs. CM Punk for the WWE Championship
April 7	WrestleMania 29	MetLife Stadium	East Rutherford, New Jersey	74,300	The Rock (c) vs. John Cena for the WWE Championship
May 19	Extreme Rules	Scottrade Center	St. Louis, Missouri	14,500	Triple H vs. Brock Lesnar in a steel cage match
June 16	Payback	Allstate Arena	Rosemont, Illinois	14,623	John Cena (c) vs. Ryback in a Three Stages of Hell match (lumberjack match, tables match, and ambulance match) for the WWE Championship
July 14	Money in the Bank	Wells Fargo Center	Philadelphia, Pennsylvania	15,000	CM Punk vs. Daniel Bryan vs. Randy Orton vs. Rob Van Dam vs. Sheamus vs. Christian in a six-man Money in the Bank ladder match
August 18	SummerSlam	Staples Center	Los Angeles, California	17,739	Daniel Bryan (c) vs. Randy Orton for the WWE Championship
September 15	Night of Champions	Joe Louis Arena	Detroit, Michigan	10,500	Randy Orton (c) vs. Daniel Bryan for the WWE Championship
October 6	Battleground	First Niagara Center	Buffalo, New York	11,700	Daniel Bryan vs. Randy Orton for the vacant WWE Championship
October 27	Hell in a Cell	American Airlines Arena	Miami, Florida	9,000	Daniel Bryan vs. Randy Orton in a Hell in a Cell match for the vacant WWE Championship
November 24	Survivor Series	TD Garden	Boston, Massachusetts	13,500	Randy Orton (c) vs. Big Show for the WWE Championship
December 15	TLC: Tables, Ladders & Chairs	Toyota Center	Houston, Texas	14,120	Randy Orton (WWE-c) vs. John Cena (World-c) in a unification Tables, Ladders, and Chairs match to unify the WWE Championship and the World Heavyweight Championship into the WWE World Heavyweight Championship

==== 2014 ====
The WWE Network launched on February 24, 2014. Every pay-per-view event from this point forward aired on both traditional PPV outlets and the WWE Network. However, beginning with NXT Arrival, several additional events began airing exclusively on the Network. These Network exclusives are noted as "Network exclusive". Beginning in 2021, some countries saw their version of the WWE Network merge under another streaming platform (e.g., in the United States, the WWE Network merged under Peacock in March 2021, which transferred to ESPN's streaming service in September 2025). The "Network exclusive" note from 2021 to 2025 also covers these other platforms.

NXT-branded event

Date	Event	Venue	Location	Attendance	Final match	Notes
January 26	Royal Rumble	Consol Energy Center	Pittsburgh, Pennsylvania	15,715	30-man Royal Rumble match	
February 23	Elimination Chamber	Target Center	Minneapolis, Minnesota	14,101	Randy Orton (c) vs. John Cena vs. Daniel Bryan vs. Sheamus vs. Christian vs. Cesaro in a six-man Elimination Chamber match for the WWE World Heavyweight Championship	
February 27	Arrival	Full Sail University	Winter Park, Florida	400+	Bo Dallas (c) vs. Adrian Neville in a ladder match for the NXT Championship	Network exclusive
April 6	WrestleMania XXX	Mercedes-Benz Superdome	New Orleans, Louisiana	60,000–65,000	Randy Orton (c) vs. Daniel Bryan vs. Batista in a triple threat match for the WWE World Heavyweight Championship	
May 4	Extreme Rules	Izod Center	East Rutherford, New Jersey	15,907	Daniel Bryan (c) vs. Kane in an Extreme Rules match for the WWE World Heavyweight Championship	
May 29	TakeOver	Full Sail University	Winter Park, Florida	400+	Adrian Neville (c) vs. Tyson Kidd for the NXT Championship	Network exclusive
June 1	Payback	Allstate Arena	Rosemont, Illinois	13,311	The Shield (Dean Ambrose, Seth Rollins, and Roman Reigns) vs. Evolution (Triple H, Randy Orton, and Batista) in a six-man tag team no holds barred elimination match	
June 29	Money in the Bank	TD Garden	Boston, Massachusetts	15,653	John Cena vs. Roman Reigns vs. Sheamus vs. Randy Orton vs. Kane vs. Bray Wyatt vs. Cesaro vs. Alberto Del Rio in an eight-man ladder match for the vacant WWE World Heavyweight Championship	
July 20	Battleground	Tampa Bay Times Forum	Tampa, Florida	12,000	John Cena (c) vs. Roman Reigns vs. Randy Orton vs. Kane in a fatal four-way match for the WWE World Heavyweight Championship	
August 17	SummerSlam	Staples Center	Los Angeles, California	17,357	John Cena (c) vs. Brock Lesnar for the WWE World Heavyweight Championship	
September 11	TakeOver: Fatal 4-Way	Full Sail University	Winter Park, Florida	400+	Adrian Neville (c) vs. Sami Zayn vs. Tyson Kidd vs. Tyler Breeze in a fatal four-way match for the NXT Championship	Network exclusive
September 21	Night of Champions	Bridgestone Arena	Nashville, Tennessee	11,000	Brock Lesnar (c) vs. John Cena for the WWE World Heavyweight Championship	
October 26	Hell in a Cell	American Airlines Center	Dallas, Texas	15,303	Dean Ambrose vs. Seth Rollins in a Hell in a Cell match	
November 23	Survivor Series	Scottrade Center	St. Louis, Missouri	12,000	Team Cena (John Cena, Dolph Ziggler, Big Show, Ryback, and Erick Rowan) vs. Team Authority (Seth Rollins, Kane, Rusev, Luke Harper, and Mark Henry) in a 5-on-5 Survivor Series match	
December 11	TakeOver: R Evolution	Full Sail University	Winter Park, Florida	400+	Adrian Neville (c) vs. Sami Zayn for the NXT Championship	Network exclusive
December 14	TLC: Tables, Ladders, Chairs... and Stairs	Quicken Loans Arena	Cleveland, Ohio	14,000	Dean Ambrose vs. Bray Wyatt in a Tables, Ladders, and Chairs match	

==== 2015 ====
NXT-branded event

Date	Event	Venue	Location	Attendance	Final match	Notes
January 25	Royal Rumble	Wells Fargo Center	Philadelphia, Pennsylvania	17,164	30-man Royal Rumble match	
February 11	TakeOver: Rival	Full Sail University	Winter Park, Florida	400+	Sami Zayn (c) vs. Kevin Owens for the NXT Championship	Network exclusive
February 22	Fastlane	FedExForum	Memphis, Tennessee	13,263	Roman Reigns vs. Daniel Bryan	
March 29	WrestleMania 31	Levi's Stadium	Santa Clara, California	67,000	Brock Lesnar (c) vs. Roman Reigns vs. Seth Rollins in a triple threat match for the WWE World Heavyweight Championship	
April 26	Extreme Rules	Allstate Arena	Rosemont, Illinois	14,197	Seth Rollins (c) vs. Randy Orton in a steel cage match for the WWE World Heavyweight Championship	
April 28	King of the Ring	iWireless Center	Moline, Illinois		Neville vs. Bad News Barrett in the King of the Ring tournament final	Network exclusive
May 17	Payback	Royal Farms Arena	Baltimore, Maryland	10,000	Seth Rollins (c) vs. Roman Reigns vs. Randy Orton vs. Dean Ambrose in a fatal four-way match for the WWE World Heavyweight Championship	
May 20	TakeOver: Unstoppable	Full Sail University	Winter Park, Florida	400+	Kevin Owens (c) vs. Sami Zayn for the NXT Championship	Network exclusive
May 31	Elimination Chamber	American Bank Center	Corpus Christi, Texas	7,000	Seth Rollins (c) vs. Dean Ambrose for the WWE World Heavyweight Championship	
June 14	Money in the Bank	Nationwide Arena	Columbus, Ohio	15,277	Seth Rollins (c) vs. Dean Ambrose in a ladder match for the WWE World Heavyweight Championship	
July 4	The Beast in the East	Ryōgoku Kokugikan	Sumida, Tokyo, Japan	8,646	John Cena and Dolph Ziggler vs. Kane and King Barrett in a tag team match	Network exclusive
July 19	Battleground	Scottrade Center	St. Louis, Missouri	11,000	Seth Rollins (c) vs. Brock Lesnar for the WWE World Heavyweight Championship	
August 22	TakeOver: Brooklyn	Barclays Center	Brooklyn, New York	15,589	"The Demon" Finn Bálor (c) vs. Kevin Owens in a ladder match for the NXT Championship	Network exclusive
August 23	SummerSlam	Barclays Center	Brooklyn, New York	15,702	The Undertaker vs. Brock Lesnar	
September 20	Night of Champions	Toyota Center	Houston, Texas	14,369	Seth Rollins (c) vs. Sting for the WWE World Heavyweight Championship	
October 3	Live from Madison Square Garden	Madison Square Garden	New York City, New York	20,224	John Cena (c) vs. Seth Rollins in a steel cage match for the WWE United States Championship	Network exclusive
October 7	TakeOver: Respect	Full Sail University	Winter Park, Florida	400+	Bayley (c) vs. Sasha Banks in a 30-minute iron man match for the NXT Women's Championship	Network exclusive
October 25	Hell in a Cell	Staples Center	Los Angeles, California	17,505	The Undertaker vs. Brock Lesnar in a Hell in a Cell match	
November 22	Survivor Series	Philips Arena	Atlanta, Georgia	14,481	Roman Reigns (c) vs. Sheamus for the WWE World Heavyweight Championship	
December 13	TLC: Tables, Ladders & Chairs	TD Garden	Boston, Massachusetts	14,903	Sheamus (c) vs. Roman Reigns in a Tables, Ladders, and Chairs match for the WWE World Heavyweight Championship	
December 16	TakeOver: London	SSE Wembley Arena	London, England	10,079	"The Demon" Finn Bálor (c) vs. Samoa Joe for the NXT Championship	Network exclusive

==== 2016 ====
Raw-branded event	SmackDown-branded event	NXT-branded event

Date	Event	Venue	Location	Attendance	Final match	Notes
January 24	Royal Rumble	Amway Center	Orlando, Florida	15,170	30-man Royal Rumble match for the WWE World Heavyweight Championship	
February 21	Fastlane	Quicken Loans Arena	Cleveland, Ohio	14,446	Roman Reigns vs. Brock Lesnar vs. Dean Ambrose in a triple threat match	
March 12	Roadblock	Ricoh Coliseum	Toronto, Ontario, Canada	9,000	Triple H (c) vs. Dean Ambrose for the WWE World Heavyweight Championship	Network exclusive
April 1	TakeOver: Dallas	Kay Bailey Hutchison Convention Center	Dallas, Texas	9,000	"The Demon" Finn Bálor (c) vs. Samoa Joe for the NXT Championship	Network exclusive
April 3	WrestleMania 32	AT&T Stadium	Arlington, Texas	80,709	Triple H (c) vs. Roman Reigns for the WWE World Heavyweight Championship	
May 1	Payback	Allstate Arena	Rosemont, Illinois	13,250	Roman Reigns (c) vs. AJ Styles for the WWE World Heavyweight Championship	
May 22	Extreme Rules	Prudential Center	Newark, New Jersey	15,963	Roman Reigns (c) vs. AJ Styles in an Extreme Rules match for the WWE World Heavyweight Championship	
June 8	TakeOver: The End	Full Sail University	Winter Park, Florida	400+	Samoa Joe (c) vs. "The Demon" Finn Bálor in a steel cage match for the NXT Championship	Network exclusive
June 19	Money in the Bank	T-Mobile Arena	Paradise, Nevada	14,150	Seth Rollins (c) vs. Dean Ambrose for the WWE World Heavyweight Championship	
July 24	Battleground	Verizon Center	Washington, D.C.	15,109	Dean Ambrose (c) vs. Roman Reigns vs. Seth Rollins in a triple threat match for the WWE Championship	
August 20	TakeOver: Brooklyn II	Barclays Center	Brooklyn, New York	15,671	Samoa Joe (c) vs. Shinsuke Nakamura for the NXT Championship	Network exclusive
August 21	SummerSlam	Barclays Center	Brooklyn, New York	15,974	Randy Orton vs. Brock Lesnar	
September 11	Backlash	Richmond Coliseum	Richmond, Virginia	7,000	Dean Ambrose (c) vs. AJ Styles for the WWE World Championship	
September 14	Cruiserweight Classic Finale	Full Sail University	Winter Park, Florida		Gran Metalik vs. T. J. Perkins in the Cruiserweight Classic tournament final for the inaugural WWE Cruiserweight Championship	Network exclusive
September 25	Clash of Champions	Bankers Life Fieldhouse	Indianapolis, Indiana	13,467	Kevin Owens (c) vs. Seth Rollins for the WWE Universal Championship	
October 9	No Mercy	Golden 1 Center	Sacramento, California	14,324	Randy Orton vs. Bray Wyatt	
October 30	Hell in a Cell	TD Garden	Boston, Massachusetts	16,119	Sasha Banks (c) vs. Charlotte Flair in a Hell in a Cell match for the WWE Raw Women's Championship	
November 19	TakeOver: Toronto	Air Canada Centre	Toronto, Ontario, Canada	12,649	Shinsuke Nakamura (c) vs. Samoa Joe for the NXT Championship	Network exclusive
November 20	Survivor Series	Air Canada Centre	Toronto, Ontario, Canada	17,143	Goldberg vs. Brock Lesnar	
December 4	TLC: Tables, Ladders & Chairs	American Airlines Center	Dallas, Texas	12,500	AJ Styles (c) vs. Dean Ambrose in a Tables, Ladders, and Chairs match for the WWE World Championship	
December 18	Roadblock: End of the Line	PPG Paints Arena	Pittsburgh, Pennsylvania	8,000	Kevin Owens (c) vs. Roman Reigns for the WWE Universal Championship	

==== 2017 ====
Raw-branded event	SmackDown-branded event	NXT-branded event	United Kingdom-branded event

Date	Event	Venue	Location	Attendance	Final match	Notes
January 14	United Kingdom Championship Tournament	Empress Ballroom	Blackpool, England	3,236	Night 1: Tyler Bate vs. Tucker	Network exclusives Aired as a two-part event
January 15	United Kingdom Championship Tournament	Empress Ballroom	Blackpool, England	3,236	Night 2: Tyler Bate vs. Pete Dunne in the tournament final for the inaugural WWE United Kingdom Championship	Network exclusives Aired as a two-part event
January 28	TakeOver: San Antonio	Freeman Coliseum	San Antonio, Texas	9,465	Shinsuke Nakamura (c) vs. Bobby Roode for the NXT Championship	Network exclusive
January 29	Royal Rumble	Alamodome	San Antonio, Texas	52,020	30-man Royal Rumble match	
February 12	Elimination Chamber	Talking Stick Resort Arena	Phoenix, Arizona	11,000	John Cena (c) vs. Dean Ambrose vs. AJ Styles vs. Bray Wyatt vs. The Miz vs. Baron Corbin in a six-man Elimination Chamber match for the WWE Championship	
March 5	Fastlane	Bradley Center	Milwaukee, Wisconsin	15,785	Kevin Owens (c) vs. Goldberg for the WWE Universal Championship	
April 1	TakeOver: Orlando	Amway Center	Orlando, Florida	14,975	Bobby Roode (c) vs. Shinsuke Nakamura for the NXT Championship	Network exclusive
April 2	WrestleMania 33	Camping World Stadium	Orlando, Florida	64,900	The Undertaker vs. Roman Reigns in a no holds barred match	
April 30	Payback	SAP Center	San Jose, California	13,694	Roman Reigns vs. Braun Strowman	
May 7 (aired May 19)	United Kingdom Championship Special	Epic Studios	Norwich, England		Tyler Bate (c) vs. Mark Andrews for the WWE United Kingdom Championship	Network exclusive
May 20	TakeOver: Chicago	Allstate Arena	Rosemont, Illinois		The Authors of Pain (Akam and Rezar) (c) vs. #DIY (Johnny Gargano and Tommaso Ciampa) in a tag team ladder match for the NXT Tag Team Championship	Network exclusive
May 21	Backlash	Allstate Arena	Rosemont, Illinois	9,800	Randy Orton (c) vs. Jinder Mahal for the WWE Championship	
June 4	Extreme Rules	Royal Farms Arena	Baltimore, Maryland	11,769	Roman Reigns vs. Seth Rollins vs. Finn Bálor vs. Bray Wyatt vs. Samoa Joe in an Extreme Rules fatal 5-way match	
June 18	Money in the Bank	Scottrade Center	St. Louis, Missouri	15,392	AJ Styles vs. Shinsuke Nakamura vs. Sami Zayn vs. Kevin Owens vs. Dolph Ziggler vs. Baron Corbin in a six-man Money in the Bank ladder match	
July 9	Great Balls of Fire	American Airlines Center	Dallas, Texas	16,579	Brock Lesnar (c) vs. Samoa Joe for the WWE Universal Championship	
July 23	Battleground	Wells Fargo Center	Philadelphia, Pennsylvania	12,500	Jinder Mahal (c) vs. Randy Orton in a Punjabi Prison match for the WWE Championship	
August 19	TakeOver: Brooklyn III	Barclays Center	Brooklyn, New York	15,275	Bobby Roode (c) vs. Drew McIntyre for the NXT Championship	Network exclusive
August 20	SummerSlam	Barclays Center	Brooklyn, New York	16,128	Brock Lesnar (c) vs. Roman Reigns vs. Samoa Joe vs. Braun Strowman in a fatal four-way match for the WWE Universal Championship	
September 12	Mae Young Classic Finale	Thomas & Mack Center	Paradise, Nevada		Kairi Sane vs. Shayna Baszler in the Mae Young Classic tournament final	Network exclusive
September 24	No Mercy	Staples Center	Los Angeles, California	16,106	Brock Lesnar (c) vs. Braun Strowman for the WWE Universal Championship	
October 8	Hell in a Cell	Little Caesars Arena	Detroit, Michigan	16,206	Shane McMahon vs. Kevin Owens in a falls count anywhere, Hell in a Cell match	
October 22	TLC: Tables, Ladders & Chairs	Target Center	Minneapolis, Minnesota	13,381	Kurt Angle and The Shield (Seth Rollins and Dean Ambrose) vs. The Miz, Braun Strowman, Kane, Cesaro, and Sheamus in a 3-on-5 handicap Tables, Ladders, and Chairs match	
November 18	TakeOver: WarGames	Toyota Center	Houston, Texas		Roderick Strong and The Authors of Pain (Akam and Rezar) vs. Sanity (Eric Young, Alexander Wolfe, and Killian Dain) vs. The Undisputed Era (Adam Cole, Bobby Fish, and Kyle O'Reilly) in a triple threat WarGames match	Network exclusive
November 19	Survivor Series	Toyota Center	Houston, Texas	14,478	Team SmackDown (Shane McMahon, John Cena, Randy Orton, Shinsuke Nakamura, and Bobby Roode) vs. Team Raw (Kurt Angle, Triple H, Finn Bálor, Braun Strowman, and Samoa Joe) in a 5-on-5 Survivor Series match	
December 17	Clash of Champions	TD Garden	Boston, Massachusetts	14,318	AJ Styles (c) vs. Jinder Mahal for the WWE Championship	

==== 2018 ====
Raw-branded event	SmackDown-branded event	NXT-branded event	United Kingdom-branded event

Date	Event	Venue	Location	Attendance	Final match	Notes
January 27	TakeOver: Philadelphia	Wells Fargo Center	Philadelphia, Pennsylvania		Andrade Cien Almas (c) vs. Johnny Gargano for the NXT Championship	Network exclusive
January 28	Royal Rumble	Wells Fargo Center	Philadelphia, Pennsylvania	17,629	30-woman Royal Rumble match	
February 25	Elimination Chamber	T-Mobile Arena	Paradise, Nevada	15,126	Roman Reigns vs. John Cena vs. Seth Rollins vs. Braun Strowman vs. Finn Bálor vs. The Miz vs. Elias in a seven-man Elimination Chamber match	
March 11	Fastlane	Nationwide Arena	Columbus, Ohio	15,119	AJ Styles (c) vs. John Cena vs. Kevin Owens vs. Sami Zayn vs. Dolph Ziggler vs. Baron Corbin in a six-pack challenge match for the WWE Championship	
April 7	TakeOver: New Orleans	Smoothie King Center	New Orleans, Louisiana	13,955	Johnny Gargano vs. Tommaso Ciampa in an unsanctioned match	Network exclusive
April 8	WrestleMania 34	Mercedes-Benz Superdome	New Orleans, Louisiana	60,000–65,000	Brock Lesnar (c) vs. Roman Reigns for the WWE Universal Championship	
April 27	Greatest Royal Rumble	King Abdullah International Stadium	Jeddah, Saudi Arabia	60,000	50-man Greatest Royal Rumble match	
May 6	Backlash	Prudential Center	Newark, New Jersey	14,724	Roman Reigns vs. Samoa Joe	
June 16	TakeOver: Chicago II	Allstate Arena	Rosemont, Illinois	11,000	Johnny Gargano vs. Tommaso Ciampa in a Chicago street fight	Network exclusive
June 17	Money in the Bank	Allstate Arena	Rosemont, Illinois	15,214	Braun Strowman vs. Finn Bálor vs. Bobby Roode vs. Kofi Kingston vs. Samoa Joe vs. Kevin Owens vs. The Miz vs. Rusev in an eight-man Money in the Bank ladder match	
June 18 (aired June 25)	United Kingdom Championship Tournament	Royal Albert Hall	London, England		Travis Banks vs. Zack Gibson in the WWE United Kingdom Championship #1 Contender tournament final	Network exclusive
June 19 (aired June 26)	U.K. Championship	Royal Albert Hall	London, England		Pete Dunne (c) vs. Zack Gibson for the WWE United Kingdom Championship	Network exclusive
July 15	Extreme Rules	PPG Paints Arena	Pittsburgh, Pennsylvania	14,739	Dolph Ziggler (c) vs. Seth Rollins in a 30-minute iron man match for the WWE Intercontinental Championship	
August 18	TakeOver: Brooklyn 4	Barclays Center	Brooklyn, New York	14,676	Tommaso Ciampa (c) vs. Johnny Gargano in a last man standing match for the NXT Championship	Network exclusive
August 19	SummerSlam	Barclays Center	Brooklyn, New York	16,169	Brock Lesnar (c) vs. Roman Reigns for the WWE Universal Championship	
September 16	Hell in a Cell	AT&T Center	San Antonio, Texas	15,216	Roman Reigns (c) vs. Braun Strowman in a Hell in a Cell match for the WWE Universal Championship	
October 6	Super Show-Down	Melbourne Cricket Ground	Melbourne, Victoria, Australia	70,309	The Undertaker vs. Triple H in a no disqualification match	
October 28	Evolution	Nassau Veterans Memorial Coliseum	Uniondale, New York	10,900	Ronda Rousey (c) vs. Nikki Bella for the WWE Raw Women's Championship	
November 2	Crown Jewel	King Saud University Stadium	Riyadh, Saudi Arabia	16,000	D-Generation X (Triple H and Shawn Michaels) vs. The Brothers of Destruction (The Undertaker and Kane) in a tag team match	
November 17	TakeOver: WarGames	Staples Center	Los Angeles, California	13,598	Ricochet, Pete Dunne, and The War Raiders (Hanson and Rowe) vs. The Undisputed Era (Adam Cole, Bobby Fish, Kyle O'Reilly, and Roderick Strong) in a 4-on-4 WarGames match	Network exclusive
November 18	Survivor Series	Staples Center	Los Angeles, California	16,325	Daniel Bryan vs. Brock Lesnar	
November 24 (aired November 25)	Starrcade	U.S. Bank Arena	Cincinnati, Ohio	7,500	AJ Styles vs. Samoa Joe in a steel cage match	Network exclusive
December 16	TLC: Tables, Ladders & Chairs	SAP Center	San Jose, California	13,408	Becky Lynch (c) vs. Charlotte Flair vs. Asuka in a triple threat Tables, Ladders, and Chairs match for the WWE SmackDown Women's Championship	

==== 2019 ====
SmackDown-branded event	NXT-branded event	NXT UK-branded event

Date	Event	Venue	Location	Attendance	Final match	Notes
January 12	TakeOver: Blackpool	Empress Ballroom	Blackpool, England		Pete Dunne (c) vs. Joe Coffey for the WWE United Kingdom Championship	Network exclusive
January 26	TakeOver: Phoenix	Talking Stick Resort Arena	Phoenix, Arizona		Tommaso Ciampa (c) vs. Aleister Black for the NXT Championship	Network exclusive
January 26–27 (aired February 2)	Worlds Collide	Phoenix Convention Center	Phoenix, Arizona		Velveteen Dream vs. Tyler Bate in the Worlds Collide tournament final	Network exclusiive
January 27	Royal Rumble	Chase Field	Phoenix, Arizona	48,193	30-person Royal Rumble match	
February 3	Halftime Heat	WWE Performance Center	Orlando, Florida		Aleister Black, Ricochet, and Velveteen Dream vs. Tommaso Ciampa, Johnny Gargano, and Adam Cole in a six-man tag team match	Network exclusive
February 17	Elimination Chamber	Toyota Center	Houston, Texas	10,200	Daniel Bryan (c) vs. AJ Styles vs. Jeff Hardy vs. Kofi Kingston vs. Randy Orton vs. Samoa Joe in a six-man Elimination Chamber match for the WWE Championship	
March 10	Fastlane	Quicken Loans Arena	Cleveland, Ohio	10,000	The Shield (Roman Reigns, Seth Rollins, and Dean Ambrose) vs. Baron Corbin, Drew McIntyre, and Bobby Lashley in a six-man tag team match	
April 5	TakeOver: New York	Barclays Center	Brooklyn, New York	15,697	Johnny Gargano vs. Adam Cole in a 2-out-of-3 falls match for the vacant NXT Championship	Network exclusive
April 7	WrestleMania 35	MetLife Stadium	East Rutherford, New Jersey	68,000–70,000	Ronda Rousey (Raw-c) vs. Charlotte Flair (SmackDown-c) vs. Becky Lynch in a winner takes all triple threat match for the WWE Raw Women's Championship and WWE SmackDown Women's Championship	
April 21	The Shield's Final Chapter	TaxSlayer Center	Moline, Illinois		The Shield (Roman Reigns, Seth Rollins, and Dean Ambrose) vs. Baron Corbin, Drew McIntyre, and Bobby Lashley in a six-man tag team match	Network exclusive
May 19	Money in the Bank	XL Center	Hartford, Connecticut	15,700	Finn Bálor vs. Ricochet vs. Ali vs. Randy Orton vs. Baron Corbin vs. Drew McIntyre vs. Andrade vs. Brock Lesnar in an eight-man Money in the Bank ladder match	
June 1	TakeOver: XXV	Webster Bank Arena	Bridgeport, Connecticut		Johnny Gargano (c) vs. Adam Cole for the NXT Championship	Network exclusive
June 7	Super ShowDown	King Abdullah International Stadium	Jeddah, Saudi Arabia	21,000	The Undertaker vs. Goldberg	
June 23	Stomping Grounds	Tacoma Dome	Tacoma, Washington	6,000	Seth Rollins (c) vs. Baron Corbin in a no countout, no disqualification match for the WWE Universal Championship	
July 13	Evolve 131: 10th Anniversary Celebration	2300 Arena	Philadelphia, Pennsylvania		Adam Cole (c) vs. Akira Tozawa for the NXT Championship	Network exclusive Non-WWE event
July 14	Extreme Rules	Wells Fargo Center	Philadelphia, Pennsylvania	12,800	Seth Rollins (c) vs. Brock Lesnar for the WWE Universal Championship	
July 27	Smackville	Bridgestone Arena	Nashville, Tennessee		Kofi Kingston (c) vs. Dolph Ziggler vs. Samoa Joe in a triple threat match for the WWE Championship	Network exclusive
August 10	TakeOver: Toronto	Scotiabank Arena	Toronto, Ontario, Canada	13,735	Adam Cole (c) vs. Johnny Gargano in a Three Stages of Hell match (singles match, street fight, and barbed wire steel cage match) for the NXT Championship	Network exclusive
August 11	SummerSlam	Scotiabank Arena	Toronto, Ontario, Canada	16,904	Brock Lesnar (c) vs. Seth Rollins for the WWE Universal Championship	
August 31	TakeOver: Cardiff	Motorpoint Arena Cardiff	Cardiff, Wales	3,600	Walter (c) vs. Tyler Bate for the WWE United Kingdom Championship	Network exclusive
September 15	Clash of Champions	Spectrum Center	Charlotte, North Carolina	8,000	Seth Rollins (c) vs. Braun Strowman for the WWE Universal Championship	
October 6	Hell in a Cell	Golden 1 Center	Sacramento, California	10,000	Seth Rollins (c) vs. "The Fiend" Bray Wyatt in a Hell in a Cell match for the WWE Universal Championship	
October 31	Crown Jewel	King Fahd International Stadium	Riyadh, Saudi Arabia	70,000	Seth Rollins (c) vs. "The Fiend" Bray Wyatt in a falls count anywhere match for the WWE Universal Championship	
November 23	TakeOver: WarGames	Allstate Arena	Rosemont, Illinois	10,500	Tommaso Ciampa, Keith Lee, Dominik Dijakovic, and Kevin Owens vs. The Undisputed Era (Adam Cole, Roderick Strong, Bobby Fish, and Kyle O'Reilly) in a 4-on-4 WarGames match	Network exclusive
November 24	Survivor Series	Allstate Arena	Rosemont, Illinois	13,271	Becky Lynch vs. Bayley vs. Shayna Baszler in a triple threat match	
December 1	Starrcade	Infinite Energy Center	Duluth, Georgia		Kevin Owens vs. Bobby Lashley	Network exclusive
December 15	TLC: Tables, Ladders & Chairs	Target Center	Minneapolis, Minnesota		The Kabuki Warriors (Asuka and Kairi Sane) (c) vs. Becky Lynch and Charlotte Flair in a tag team Tables, Ladders, and Chairs match for the WWE Women's Tag Team Championship	

=== 2020s ===
==== 2020 ====
NXT-branded event	NXT UK-branded event

Date	Event	Venue	Location	Attendance	Final match	Notes
January 12	TakeOver: Blackpool II	Empress Ballroom	Blackpool, England		Walter (c) vs. Joe Coffey for the WWE United Kingdom Championship	Network exclusive
January 25	Worlds Collide	Toyota Center	Houston, Texas		The Undisputed Era (Adam Cole, Roderick Strong, Bobby Fish, and Kyle O'Reilly) vs. Imperium (Walter, Alexander Wolfe, Fabian Aichner, and Marcel Barthel) in an eight-man tag team match	Network exclusive
January 26	Royal Rumble	Minute Maid Park	Houston, Texas	42,715	30-man Royal Rumble match	
February 16	TakeOver: Portland	Moda Center	Portland, Oregon		Adam Cole (c) vs. Tommaso Ciampa for the NXT Championship	Network exclusive
February 27	Super ShowDown	Mohammed Abdo Arena	Riyadh, Saudi Arabia		"The Fiend" Bray Wyatt (c) vs. Goldberg for the WWE Universal Championship	
March 8	Elimination Chamber	Wells Fargo Center	Philadelphia, Pennsylvania	14,853	Natalya vs. Liv Morgan vs. Asuka vs. Shayna Baszler vs. Ruby Riott vs. Sarah Logan in a six-woman Elimination Chamber match	
March 25–26 (aired April 4–5)	WrestleMania 36	WWE Performance Center	Orlando, Florida	0	Night 1 (April 4): The Undertaker vs. AJ Styles in a boneyard match	Aired as a two-part event and was the first PPV affected by the COVID-19 pandemic, resulting in WWE's subsequent shows being presented behind closed doors
March 25–26 (aired April 4–5)	WrestleMania 36	WWE Performance Center	Orlando, Florida	0	Night 2 (April 5): Brock Lesnar (c) vs. Drew McIntyre for the WWE Championship	Aired as a two-part event and was the first PPV affected by the COVID-19 pandemic, resulting in WWE's subsequent shows being presented behind closed doors
May 10	Money in the Bank	WWE Performance Center and WWE Global Headquarters	Orlando, Florida and Stamford, Connecticut	0	Daniel Bryan vs. Rey Mysterio vs. Aleister Black vs. Otis vs. AJ Styles vs. King Corbin in a six-man Money in the Bank ladder match and Lacey Evans vs. Carmella vs. Dana Brooke vs. Asuka vs. Nia Jax vs. Shayna Baszler in a six-woman Money in the Bank ladder match for the WWE Raw Women's Championship	The final two matches took place simultaneously and were pre-recorded on April 15
June 7	TakeOver: In Your House	Full Sail University	Winter Park, Florida	0	Charlotte Flair (c) vs. Rhea Ripley vs. Io Shirai in a triple threat match for the NXT Women's Championship	Network exclusive
June 14	Backlash	WWE Performance Center	Orlando, Florida	0	Edge vs. Randy Orton	The final match was pre-recorded on June 7
July 19	The Horror Show at Extreme Rules	WWE Performance Center	Orlando, Florida	0	Braun Strowman vs. Bray Wyatt in a Wyatt Swamp Fight	The final match was pre-recorded on July 16–17
August 22	TakeOver XXX	Full Sail University	Winter Park, Florida	0	Keith Lee (c) vs. Karrion Kross for the NXT Championship	Network exclusive
August 23	SummerSlam	Amway Center	Orlando, Florida	0	Braun Strowman (c) vs. "The Fiend" Bray Wyatt in a falls count anywhere match for the WWE Universal Championship	First PPV to feature the WWE ThunderDome
August 30	Payback	Amway Center	Orlando, Florida	0	"The Fiend" Bray Wyatt (c) vs. Roman Reigns vs. Braun Strowman in a triple threat no holds barred match for the WWE Universal Championship	
September 27	Clash of Champions	Amway Center	Orlando, Florida	0	Roman Reigns (c) vs. Jey Uso for the WWE Universal Championship	
October 4	TakeOver 31	WWE Performance Center	Orlando, Florida	0	Finn Bálor (c) vs. Kyle O'Reilly for the NXT Championship	
October 25	Hell in a Cell	Amway Center	Orlando, Florida	0	Drew McIntyre (c) vs. Randy Orton in a Hell in a Cell match for the WWE Championship	
November 22	Survivor Series	Amway Center	Orlando, Florida	0	Drew McIntyre vs. Roman Reigns	
December 6	TakeOver: WarGames	WWE Performance Center	Orlando, Florida	0	The Undisputed Era (Adam Cole, Roderick Strong, Bobby Fish, and Kyle O'Reilly) vs. Pat McAfee, Pete Dunne, Oney Lorcan, and Danny Burch in a 4-on-4 WarGames match	
December 20	TLC: Tables, Ladders & Chairs	Tropicana Field	St. Petersburg, Florida	0	"The Fiend" Bray Wyatt vs. Randy Orton in a Firefly Inferno match	

==== 2021 ====
NXT-branded event

Date	Event	Venue	Location	Attendance	Final match	Notes
January 22 (aired January 26)	Superstar Spectacle	Tropicana Field	St. Petersburg, Florida	0	Drew McIntyre and The Indus Sher (Rinku and Saurav) vs. Jinder Mahal and The Bollywood Boyz (Sunil Singh and Samir Singh)	Network exclusive
January 31	Royal Rumble	Tropicana Field	St. Petersburg, Florida	0	30-man Royal Rumble match	
February 14	TakeOver: Vengeance Day	WWE Performance Center	Orlando, Florida	0	Finn Bálor (c) vs. Pete Dunne for the NXT Championship	
February 21	Elimination Chamber	Tropicana Field	St. Petersburg, Florida	0	Drew McIntyre (c) vs. The Miz for the WWE Championship	
March 21	Fastlane	Tropicana Field	St. Petersburg, Florida	0	Roman Reigns (c) vs. Daniel Bryan for the WWE Universal Championship	First PPV to air on Peacock in the U.S.
April 7	TakeOver: Stand & Deliver	WWE Performance Center	Orlando, Florida	500	Night 1: Io Shirai (c) vs. Raquel González for the NXT Women's Championship	Night 1 was a WWE Network and USA Network exclusive simulcast Aired as a two-part event
April 8	TakeOver: Stand & Deliver	WWE Performance Center	Orlando, Florida	500	Night 2: Kyle O'Reilly vs. Adam Cole in an unsanctioned match	Night 1 was a WWE Network and USA Network exclusive simulcast Aired as a two-part event
April 10	WrestleMania 37	Raymond James Stadium	Tampa, Florida	17,946	Night 1: Sasha Banks (c) vs. Bianca Belair for the WWE SmackDown Women's Championship	Aired as a two-part event
April 11	WrestleMania 37	Raymond James Stadium	Tampa, Florida	18,501	Night 2: Roman Reigns (c) vs. Edge vs. Daniel Bryan in a triple threat match for the WWE Universal Championship	Aired as a two-part event
May 16	WrestleMania Backlash	Yuengling Center	Tampa, Florida	0	Roman Reigns (c) vs. Cesaro for the WWE Universal Championship	
June 13	TakeOver: In Your House	WWE Performance Center	Orlando, Florida		Karrion Kross (c) vs. Kyle O'Reilly vs. Adam Cole vs. Johnny Gargano vs. Pete Dunne in a fatal five-way match for the NXT Championship	
June 20	Hell in a Cell	Yuengling Center	Tampa, Florida	0	Bobby Lashley (c) vs. Drew Mcintyre in a Last Chance Hell in a Cell match for the WWE Championship	Final PPV to feature the WWE ThunderDome
July 18	Money in the Bank	Dickies Arena	Fort Worth, Texas	14,541	Roman Reigns (c) vs. Edge for the WWE Universal Championship	
August 21	SummerSlam	Allegiant Stadium	Paradise, Nevada	45,690	Roman Reigns (c) vs. John Cena for the WWE Universal Championship	
August 22	TakeOver 36	WWE Performance Center	Orlando, Florida		Karrion Kross (c) vs. Samoa Joe for the NXT Championship	
September 26	Extreme Rules	Nationwide Arena	Columbus, Ohio	13,455	Roman Reigns (c) vs. "The Demon" Finn Bálor in an Extreme Rules match for the WWE Universal Championship	
October 21	Crown Jewel	Mohammed Abdo Arena	Riyadh, Saudi Arabia	22,000	Roman Reigns (c) vs. Brock Lesnar for the WWE Universal Championship	
November 21	Survivor Series	Barclays Center	Brooklyn, New York	15,120	Big E vs. Roman Reigns	
December 5	WarGames	WWE Performance Center	Orlando, Florida		Team Black & Gold (Tommaso Ciampa, Johnny Gargano, Pete Dunne, and LA Knight) vs. Team 2.0 (Bron Breakker, Carmelo Hayes, Grayson Waller, and Tony D'Angelo) in a WarGames match	

==== 2022 ====
NXT-branded event

Date	Event	Venue	Location	Attendance	Final match	Notes
January 1	Day 1	State Farm Arena	Atlanta, Georgia	13,657	Big E (c) vs. Seth "Freakin" Rollins vs. Kevin Owens vs. Bobby Lashley vs. Brock Lesnar in a Fatal five-way match for the WWE Championship	
January 29	Royal Rumble	The Dome at America's Center	St. Louis, Missouri	44,390	30-man Royal Rumble match	
February 19	Elimination Chamber	Jeddah Super Dome	Jeddah, Saudi Arabia	33,328	Bobby Lashley (c) vs. AJ Styles vs. Austin Theory vs. Brock Lesnar vs. Riddle vs. Seth "Freakin" Rollins in a six-man Elimination Chamber match for the WWE Championship	
April 2	Stand & Deliver	American Airlines Center	Dallas, Texas		Dolph Ziggler (c) vs. Bron Breakker for the NXT Championship	Network exclusive Aired the afternoon of WrestleMania 38
April 2	WrestleMania 38	AT&T Stadium	Arlington, Texas	65,719	Night 1: Stone Cold Steve Austin vs. Kevin Owens in a No Holds Barred match	Aired as a two-part event
April 3	WrestleMania 38	AT&T Stadium	Arlington, Texas	65,653	Night 2: Brock Lesnar (WWE-c) vs. Roman Reigns (Universal-c) in a Winner Takes All match to unify the WWE Championship and WWE Universal Championship	Aired as a two-part event
May 8	WrestleMania Backlash	Dunkin' Donuts Center	Providence, Rhode Island	8,050	Drew McIntyre and RK-Bro (Randy Orton and Riddle) vs. The Bloodline (Roman Reigns and The Usos (Jey Uso and Jimmy Uso)) in a six-man tag team match	
June 4	In Your House	WWE Performance Center	Orlando, Florida		Bron Breakker (c) vs. Joe Gacy for the NXT Championship	Network exclusive
June 5	Hell in a Cell	Allstate Arena	Rosemont, Illinois	12,834	Cody Rhodes vs. Seth "Freakin" Rollins in a Hell in a Cell match	
July 2	Money in the Bank	MGM Grand Garden Arena	Paradise, Nevada	12,076	Drew McIntyre vs. Madcap Moss vs. Omos vs. Riddle vs. Sami Zayn vs. Seth "Freakin" Rollins vs. Sheamus vs. Theory in an eight-man Money in the Bank ladder match	
July 30	SummerSlam	Nissan Stadium	Nashville, Tennessee	48,449	Roman Reigns (c) vs. Brock Lesnar in a Last Man Standing match for the Undisputed WWE Universal Championship	
September 3	Clash at the Castle	Principality Stadium	Cardiff, Wales	62,296	Roman Reigns (c) vs. Drew McIntyre for the Undisputed WWE Universal Championship	
September 4	Worlds Collide	WWE Performance Center	Orlando, Florida		Bron Breakker (NXT-c) vs. Tyler Bate (NXT UK-c) to unify the NXT Championship and NXT United Kingdom Championship	Network exclusive
October 8	Extreme Rules	Wells Fargo Center	Philadelphia, Pennsylvania	15,944	Matt Riddle vs. Seth "Freakin" Rollins in a Fight Pit match	
October 22	Halloween Havoc	WWE Performance Center	Orlando, Florida		Bron Breakker (c) vs. Ilja Dragunov vs. JD McDonagh in a triple threat match for the NXT Championship	Network exclusive
November 5	Crown Jewel	Mrsool Park	Riyadh, Saudi Arabia		Roman Reigns (c) vs. Logan Paul for the Undisputed WWE Universal Championship	
November 26	Survivor Series: WarGames	TD Garden	Boston, Massachusetts	15,609	The Brawling Brutes (Sheamus, Ridge Holland, and Butch), Drew McIntyre, and Kevin Owens vs. The Bloodline (Roman Reigns, Solo Sikoa, Sami Zayn, and The Usos (Jey Uso and Jimmy Uso)) in a WarGames match	
December 10	Deadline	WWE Performance Center	Orlando, Florida		Bron Breakker (c) vs. Apollo Crews for the NXT Championship	Network exclusive

==== 2023 ====
NXT-branded event

Date	Event	Venue	Location	Attendance	Final match	Notes
January 28	Royal Rumble	Alamodome	San Antonio, Texas	42,928	Roman Reigns (c) vs. Kevin Owens for the Undisputed WWE Universal Championship	
February 4	Vengeance Day	Spectrum Center	Charlotte, North Carolina	5,719	Bron Breakker (c) vs. Grayson Waller in a Steel Cage match for the NXT Championship	Network exclusive
February 18	Elimination Chamber	Bell Centre	Montreal, Quebec, Canada	17,271	Roman Reigns (c) vs. Sami Zayn for the Undisputed WWE Universal Championship	
April 1	Stand & Deliver	Crypto.com Arena	Los Angeles, California	7,584	Bron Breakker (c) vs. Carmelo Hayes for the NXT Championship	Network exclusive Aired the afternoon of WrestleMania 39
April 1	WrestleMania 39	SoFi Stadium	Inglewood, California	67,303	Night 1: The Usos (Jey Uso and Jimmy Uso) (c) vs. Kevin Owens and Sami Zayn for the Undisputed WWE Tag Team Championship	Aired as a two-part event
April 2	WrestleMania 39	SoFi Stadium	Inglewood, California	67,553	Night 2: Roman Reigns (c) vs. Cody Rhodes for the Undisputed WWE Universal Championship	Aired as a two-part event
May 6	Backlash	Coliseo de Puerto Rico José Miguel Agrelot	San Juan, Puerto Rico	17,944	Cody Rhodes vs. Brock Lesnar	
May 27	Night of Champions	Jeddah Super Dome	Jeddah, Saudi Arabia	13,000	Kevin Owens and Sami Zayn (c) vs. The Bloodline (Roman Reigns and Solo Sikoa) for the Undisputed WWE Tag Team Championship	
May 28	Battleground	Tsongas Center	Lowell, Massachusetts	3,482	Carmelo Hayes (c) vs. Bron Breakker for the NXT Championship	Network exclusive
July 1	Money in the Bank	The O2 Arena	London, England	18,885	The Bloodline (Roman Reigns and Solo Sikoa) vs. The Usos (Jey Uso and Jimmy Uso)	
July 30	The Great American Bash	H-E-B Center	Cedar Park, Texas	4,252	Carmelo Hayes (c) vs. Ilja Dragunov for the NXT Championship	Network exclusive
August 5	SummerSlam	Ford Field	Detroit, Michigan	51,477	Roman Reigns (c) vs. Jey Uso in a Tribal Combat match for the Undisputed WWE Universal Championship and recognition of Tribal Chief of the Anoaʻi family	
September 2	Payback	PPG Paints Arena	Pittsburgh, Pennsylvania	14,584	Seth "Freakin" Rollins (c) vs. Shinsuke Nakamura for the World Heavyweight Championship	
September 30	No Mercy	Mechanics Bank Arena	Bakersfield, California	4,954	Becky Lynch (c) vs. Tiffany Stratton in an Extreme Rules match for the NXT Women's Championship	Network exclusive
October 7	Fastlane	Gainbridge Fieldhouse	Indianapolis, Indiana	14,529	Seth "Freakin" Rollins (c) vs. Shinsuke Nakamura in a Last Man Standing match for the World Heavyweight Championship	
November 4	Crown Jewel	Mohammed Abdo Arena	Riyadh, Saudi Arabia	10,291	Roman Reigns (c) vs. LA Knight for the Undisputed WWE Universal Championship	
November 25	Survivor Series: WarGames	Allstate Arena	Rosemont, Illinois	17,138	Cody Rhodes, Seth "Freakin" Rollins, Jey Uso, Sami Zayn, and Randy Orton vs. The Judgment Day (Damian Priest, Finn Bálor, "Dirty" Dominik Mysterio, and JD McDonagh) and Drew McIntyre in a WarGames match	
December 9	Deadline	Total Mortgage Arena	Bridgeport, Connecticut	5,529	Ilja Dragunov (c) vs. Baron Corbin for the NXT Championship	Network exclusive

==== 2024 ====
NXT-branded event

Date	Event	Venue	Location	Attendance	Final match	Notes
January 27	Royal Rumble	Tropicana Field	St. Petersburg, Florida	48,044	30-man Royal Rumble match	
February 4	Vengeance Day	F&M Bank Arena	Clarksville, Tennessee	3,970	Ilja Dragunov (c) vs. Trick Williams for the NXT Championship	Network exclusive
February 24	Elimination Chamber	Optus Stadium	Burswood, Western Australia, Australia	52,590	Rhea Ripley (c) vs. Nia Jax for the Women's World Championship	
April 6	Stand & Deliver	Wells Fargo Center	Philadelphia, Pennsylvania	16,545	Trick Williams vs. Carmelo Hayes	Network exclusive Aired the afternoon of WrestleMania XL
April 6	WrestleMania XL	Lincoln Financial Field	Philadelphia, Pennsylvania	60,036	Night 1: The Bloodline (The Rock and Roman Reigns) vs. Cody Rhodes and Seth "Freakin" Rollins	Aired as a two-part event
April 7	WrestleMania XL	Lincoln Financial Field	Philadelphia, Pennsylvania	60,203	Night 2: Roman Reigns (c) vs. Cody Rhodes in a Bloodline Rules match for the Undisputed WWE Universal Championship	Aired as a two-part event
May 4	Backlash	LDLC Arena	Décines-Charpieu, France	11,628	Cody Rhodes (c) vs. AJ Styles for the Undisputed WWE Championship	
May 25	King and Queen of the Ring	Jeddah Super Dome	Jeddah, Saudi Arabia	20,000	Cody Rhodes (c) vs. Logan Paul for the Undisputed WWE Championship	
June 9	Battleground	UFC Apex	Enterprise, Nevada	679	Trick Williams (c) vs. Ethan Page for the NXT Championship	Network exclusive
June 15	Clash at the Castle	OVO Hydro	Glasgow, Scotland	11,391	Damian Priest (c) vs. Drew McIntyre for the World Heavyweight Championship	
July 6	Money in the Bank	Scotiabank Arena	Toronto, Ontario, Canada	19,858	Cody Rhodes, Randy Orton, and Kevin Owens vs. The Bloodline (Solo Sikoa, Tama Tonga, and Jacob Fatu) in a six-man tag team match	
July 7	Heatwave	Scotiabank Arena	Toronto, Ontario, Canada	9,132	Trick Williams (c) vs. Je'Von Evans vs. Ethan Page vs. Shawn Spears in a fatal four-way match for the NXT Championship	Network exclusive
August 3	SummerSlam	Cleveland Browns Stadium	Cleveland, Ohio	57,791	Cody Rhodes (c) vs. Solo Sikoa in a Bloodline Rules match for the Undisputed WWE Championship	
August 31	Bash in Berlin	Uber Arena	Berlin, Germany	13,149	Gunther (c) vs. Randy Orton for the World Heavyweight Championship	
September 1	No Mercy	Ball Arena	Denver, Colorado	6,899	Ethan Page (c) vs. Joe Hendry for the NXT Championship with Trick Williams as the special guest referee	Network exclusive
October 5	Bad Blood	State Farm Arena	Atlanta, Georgia	16,902	Cody Rhodes and Roman Reigns vs. The Bloodline (Solo Sikoa and Jacob Fatu)	
October 27	Halloween Havoc	Giant Center	Hershey, Pennsylvania	4,940	Trick Williams (c) vs. Ethan Page in a Spin the Wheel, Make the Deal: Devil's Playground match for the NXT Championship	Network exclusive
November 2	Crown Jewel	Mohammed Abdo Arena	Riyadh, Saudi Arabia	20,000	Cody Rhodes (Undisputed-c) vs. Gunther (World-c) for the inaugural WWE Crown Jewel Championship	
November 30	Survivor Series: WarGames	Rogers Arena	Vancouver, British Columbia, Canada	17,828	Roman Reigns, The Usos (Jey Uso and Jimmy Uso), Sami Zayn, and CM Punk vs. The Bloodline (Solo Sikoa, Jacob Fatu, Tama Tonga, and Tonga Loa) and Bronson Reed in a WarGames match	
December 7	Deadline	Minneapolis Armory	Minneapolis, Minnesota	2,000	Sol Ruca vs. Stephanie Vaquer vs. Zaria vs. Giulia vs. Wren Sinclair in a five-woman Iron Survivor Challenge	Network exclusive
December 14	Saturday Night's Main Event	Nassau Veterans Memorial Coliseum	Uniondale, New York	14,186	Cody Rhodes (c) vs. Kevin Owens for the Undisputed WWE Championship	Peacock and NBC exclusive simulcast Sequentially referred to as Saturday Night's Main Event 37

==== 2025 ====
Starting in January 2025, WWE began a partnership with Netflix where Raw would broadcast live worldwide weekly. Internationally outside the United States, all episodes of SmackDown and NXT, as well as livestreaming supercards, would also move to Netflix. With this partnership, WWE discontinued the WWE Network in all countries, with the exception of a few due to pre-existing contracts; by April 1, 2026, all other countries had transitioned to Netflix, bringing a complete end to the WWE Network, with the exception of Sub-Saharan Africa and Japan, which remain on SuperSport and Abema, respectively. Every livestreaming supercard in 2025 would air on Peacock in the United States until August 2025, after which, they transferred to ESPN. With the discontinuation of the WWE Network around the world, the "Network exclusive" notation is no longer valid as of January 2025.

NXT-branded event	Co-produced with AAA

Date	Event	Venue	Location	Attendance	Final match	Notes
January 25	Saturday Night's Main Event	Frost Bank Center	San Antonio, Texas	16,406	Gunther (c) vs. Jey Uso for the World Heavyweight Championship	Sequentially referred to as Saturday Night's Main Event 38
February 1	Royal Rumble	Lucas Oil Stadium	Indianapolis, Indiana	70,347	30-man Royal Rumble match	
February 15	Vengeance Day	CareFirst Arena	Washington, D.C.	3,849	Giulia (c) vs. Bayley vs. Roxanne Perez vs. Cora Jade in a fatal four-way match for the NXT Women's Championship	
March 1	Elimination Chamber	Rogers Centre	Toronto, Ontario, Canada	38,493	John Cena vs. CM Punk vs. Drew McIntyre vs. Logan Paul vs. Damian Priest vs. Seth "Freakin" Rollins in a six-man Elimination Chamber match	
April 19	Stand & Deliver	T-Mobile Arena	Paradise, Nevada	~7,000	Oba Femi (c) vs. Je'Von Evans vs. Trick Williams in a triple threat match for the NXT Championship	Aired on the afternoon of WrestleMania 41
April 19	WrestleMania 41	Allegiant Stadium	Paradise, Nevada	60,151	Night 1: CM Punk vs. Roman Reigns vs. Seth Rollins in a triple threat match	Aired as a two-part event
April 20	WrestleMania 41	Allegiant Stadium	Paradise, Nevada	60,212	Night 2: Cody Rhodes (c) vs. John Cena for the Undisputed WWE Championship	Aired as a two-part event
May 10	Backlash	Enterprise Center	St. Louis, Missouri	17,155	John Cena (c) vs. Randy Orton for the Undisputed WWE Championship	
May 24	Saturday Night's Main Event	Yuengling Center	Tampa, Florida	9,762	Jey Uso (c) vs. Logan Paul for the World Heavyweight Championship	Sequentially referred to as Saturday Night's Main Event 39
May 25	Battleground	Yuengling Center	Tampa, Florida	7,481	Joe Hendry (c) vs. Trick Williams for the TNA World Championship	
June 7	Worlds Collide	Kia Forum	Inglewood, California	10,825	El Hijo del Vikingo (c) vs. Chad Gable for the AAA Mega Championship	Aired on the afternoon of Money in the Bank Retroactively known as Worlds Collide: Los Angeles
June 7	Money in the Bank	Intuit Dome	Inglewood, California	17,069	Cody Rhodes and Jey Uso vs. John Cena and Logan Paul	
June 28	Night of Champions	Kingdom Arena	Riyadh, Saudi Arabia	25,000	John Cena (c) vs. CM Punk for the Undisputed WWE Championship	
July 12	The Great American Bash	Center Stage	Atlanta, Georgia	768	Jordynne Grace and Blake Monroe vs. Fatal Influence (Jacy Jayne and Fallon Henley)	Aired on the afternoon of Saturday Night's Main Event.
July 12	Saturday Night's Main Event	State Farm Arena	Atlanta, Georgia	12,350	Gunther (c) vs. Goldberg for the World Heavyweight Championship	Sequentially referred to as Saturday Night's Main Event 40
July 13	Evolution	State Farm Arena	Atlanta, Georgia	8,351	Iyo Sky (c) vs. Rhea Ripley vs. Naomi in a triple threat match for the Women's World Championship	
August 2	SummerSlam	MetLife Stadium	East Rutherford, New Jersey	53,161	Night 1: CM Punk (c) vs. Seth Rollins for the World Heavyweight Championship	Aired as a two-part event
August 3	SummerSlam	MetLife Stadium	East Rutherford, New Jersey	60,561	Night 2: John Cena (c) vs. Cody Rhodes in a Street Fight for the Undisputed WWE Championship	Aired as a two-part event
August 16	Triplemanía XXXIII	Arena CDMX	Mexico City, Mexico	19,691	El Hijo del Vikingo (c) vs. Dominik Mysterio vs. Dragon Lee vs. El Grande Americano in a four-way match for the AAA Mega Championship	
August 24	Heatwave	Lowell Memorial Auditorium	Lowell, Massachusetts	1,830	Oba Femi (c) vs. Je'Von Evans for the NXT Championship	
August 31	Clash in Paris	Paris La Défense Arena	La Défense, Nanterre, France	30,343	Seth Rollins (c) vs. CM Punk vs. Jey Uso vs. LA Knight in a fatal four-way match for the World Heavyweight Championship	
September 12	Worlds Collide	Cox Pavilion at the Thomas & Mack Center	Paradise, Nevada		El Hijo del Vikingo (c) vs. Dominik Mysterio for the AAA Mega Championship	Also known as Worlds Collide: Las Vegas
September 20	Wrestlepalooza	Gainbridge Fieldhouse	Indianapolis, Indiana	15,176	Cody Rhodes (c) vs. Drew McIntyre for the Undisputed WWE Championship	First PLE on ESPN app in the U.S.
September 27	No Mercy	FTL War Memorial	Fort Lauderdale, Florida	1,386	Oba Femi (c) vs. Ricky Saints for the NXT Championship	
October 11	Crown Jewel	RAC Arena	Perth, Western Australia, Australia	13,683	Cody Rhodes (Undisputed-c) vs. Seth Rollins (World-c) for the WWE Crown Jewel Championship	
October 25	Halloween Havoc	Findlay Toyota Center	Prescott Valley, Arizona	2,667	Ricky Saints (c) vs. Trick Williams for the NXT Championship	
November 1	Saturday Night's Main Event	Delta Center	Salt Lake City, Utah	~7,900	CM Punk vs. Jey Uso for the vacant World Heavyweight Championship	Sequentially referred to as Saturday Night's Main Event 41
November 29	Survivor Series: WarGames	Petco Park	San Diego, California	46,016	CM Punk, Cody Rhodes, Roman Reigns, and The Usos (Jey Uso and Jimmy Uso) vs. Brock Lesnar, Drew McIntyre, Logan Paul, and The Vision (Bron Breakker and Bronson Reed) in a WarGames match	
December 6	Deadline	Boeing Center at Tech Port	San Antonio, Texas	1,982	Je'Von Evans vs. Leon Slater vs. Joe Hendry vs. Dion Lennox vs. Myles Borne in a five-man Iron Survivor Challenge	
December 13	Saturday Night's Main Event	Capital One Arena	Washington, D.C.	17,121	John Cena vs. Gunther	Sequentially referred to as Saturday Night's Main Event 42
December 20	Guerra de Titanes	Arena Guadalajara	Guadalajara, Jalisco, Mexico		Los Gringos Locos 2.0 (Dominik Mysterio and El Grande Americano) vs. Rey Fénix and Rey Mysterio	

==== 2026 ====
NXT-branded event

Date	Event	Venue	Location	Attendance	Final match	Notes
January 24	Saturday Night's Main Event	Bell Centre	Montreal, Quebec, Canada	12,891	Randy Orton vs. Trick Williams vs. Damian Priest vs. Sami Zayn in a Fatal four-way match to determine the #1 contender for the Undisputed WWE Championship at the Royal Rumble	Sequentially referred to as Saturday Night's Main Event 43
January 31	Royal Rumble	Riyadh Season Stadium at King Abdullah Financial District	Riyadh, Saudi Arabia	25,000	30-man Royal Rumble match	
February 28	Elimination Chamber	United Center	Chicago, Illinois	19,346	Randy Orton vs. LA Knight vs. Cody Rhodes vs. Je'Von Evans vs. Trick Williams vs. Logan Paul in a six-man Elimination Chamber match	
March 7	Vengeance Day	WWE Performance Center	Orlando, Florida		Joe Hendry (c) vs. Ricky Saints for the NXT Championship	
April 4	Stand & Deliver	The Factory at The District	Chesterfield, Missouri	1,767	Joe Hendry (c) vs. Ricky Saints vs. Ethan Page vs. Tony D'Angelo in a fatal four-way match for the NXT Championship	
April 18	WrestleMania 42	Allegiant Stadium	Paradise, Nevada	50,816	Cody Rhodes (c) vs. Randy Orton for the Undisputed WWE Championship	Aired as a two-part event
April 19	WrestleMania 42	Allegiant Stadium	Paradise, Nevada	55,256	CM Punk (c) vs. Roman Reigns for the World Heavyweight Championship	Aired as a two-part event
May 9	Backlash	Benchmark International Arena	Tampa, Florida	14,712	Roman Reigns (c) vs. Jacob Fatu for the World Heavyweight Championship	
May 23	Saturday Night's Main Event	Allen County War Memorial Coliseum	Fort Wayne, Indiana	10,635	The Vision (Logan Paul and Austin Theory) (c) vs. The Street Profits (Angelo Dawkins and Montez Ford) for the World Tag Team Championship	Sequentially referred to as Saturday Night's Main Event 44
May 31	Clash in Italy	Inalpi Arena	Turin, Italy	12,977	Roman Reigns (c) vs. Jacob Fatu in a Tribal Combat for the World Heavyweight Championship	
June 27	Night of Champions	Kingdom Arena	Riyadh, Saudi Arabia	18,000	Cody Rhodes (c) vs. Gunther vs. Sami Zayn in a triple threat match for the Undisputed WWE Championship	
June 28	The Great American Bash	WWE Performance Center	Orlando, Florida		Lola Vice (c) vs. Kendal Grey for the NXT Women's Championship	First NXT PLE to air on The CW in the U.S. and stream on Netflix internationally
July 18	Saturday Night's Main Event	Madison Square Garden	New York City, New York	15,361	CM Punk and Cody Rhodes vs. Gunther and Sami Zayn in a tag team match	Sequentially referred to as Saturday Night's Main Event 45
August 1	SummerSlam	U.S. Bank Stadium	Minneapolis, Minnesota	36,683	Oba Femi vs. Brock Lesnar in a Hell in a Cell match	Aired as a two-part event
August 2	SummerSlam	U.S. Bank Stadium	Minneapolis, Minnesota	33,086	Roman Reigns (c) vs. Seth Rollins for the World Heavyweight Championship	Aired as a two-part event
August 30	Ola de Calor	Bert Ogden Arena	Edinburg, Texas	5,581	Los Perros del Mal (Daga, Angel, and Berto) vs. Dragon Lee and The Lucha Brothers (Penta and Rey Fénix)	First stand-alone AAA event to take place in the United States since the WWE acquisition
August 30	Heatwave	Bert Ogden Arena	Edinburg, Texas	5,581	Tony D'Angelo (c) vs. Cruz Montana vs. Grayson Waller vs. Zilla Fatu in a fatal four-way match for the NXT Championship	First NXT PLE to air on ESPN Unlimited in the U.S., simulcast on both it and The CW
September 6	Sunday Night's Main Event	State Farm Arena	Atlanta, Georgia	11,429	Cody Rhodes vs. Randy Orton	
September 11	Triplemanía 34	MGM Grand Garden Arena	Paradise, Nevada	6,604	Omos vs. Rey Mysterio	Aired as a two-part event First Triplemanía event to take place in the United States since the WWE acquisition and the first held in the U.S. overall since 1996
September 13	Triplemanía 34	Arena CDMX	Mexico City, Mexico	18,204	Dominik Mysterio (c) vs. El Grande Americano in a No Disqualification match for the AAA Mega Championship	Aired as a two-part event First Triplemanía event to take place in the United States since the WWE acquisition and the first held in the U.S. overall since 1996
September 26 (aired September 30)	Worlds Collide	Allstate Arena	Rosemont, Illinois	13,979	CM Punk, Rey Mysterio, and El Grande Americano vs. Omos, Dominik Mysterio, and JD McDonagh in a trios match	Also known as Worlds Collide: Chicago
October 10	Money in the Bank	Smoothie King Center	New Orleans, Louisiana	12,935	Bron Breakker vs. CM Punk vs. Je'Von Evans vs. Kevin Owens vs. Penta vs. Trick Williams in a six-man Money in the Bank ladder match	
October 31	Halloween Havoc	WWE Performance Center	Orlando, Florida		Grayson Waller (c) vs. Tony D'Angelo for the NXT Championship	
November 7	Crown Jewel	ANB Arena	Riyadh, Saudi Arabia	~8000	Sami Zayn (Undisputed-c) vs. Roman Reigns (World-c) for the WWE Crown Jewel Championship	

== Upcoming event schedule ==
=== 2026 ===
NXT-branded event	Co-produced with AAA

Date	Event	Venue	Location	Notes
November 28	Survivor Series: WarGames	Daikin Park	Houston, Texas	
December 12	Wrestlepalooza	RAC Arena	Perth, Western Australia, Australia	
December 12	TLC: Tables, Ladders & Chairs	WWE Performance Center	Orlando, Florida	
December 15	Worlds Collide: Doomsday	ESPN Wide World of Sports Complex	Kissimmee, Florida	Held in conjunction with Marvel Studios

=== 2027 ===
NXT-branded event	Co-produced with AAA

Date	Event	Venue	Location	Notes
February 6	Royal Rumble	State Farm Stadium	Glendale, Arizona	
April	Eternal Glory	Infosys Theater at Madison Square Garden	New York City, New York	
April	Stand & Deliver	Infosys Theater at Madison Square Garden	New York City, New York	
April	WrestleMania 43	TBA	Riyadh, Saudi Arabia	Will air as a two-part event
April	WrestleMania 43	TBA	Riyadh, Saudi Arabia	Will air as a two-part event

== Number of events by year ==
Overall total – 567 (10 more confirmed)

Number of WWE pay-per-view and livestreaming supercards

== Themed events ==
Many WWE events are thematic, centering on particular types of matches, or have an annually recurring main event. Most themed or gimmick events (sans the "Big Five" events) are roughly treated like filler themed events to carry the audience until the next event dating back to the days when the In Your House system was used.

Event	Feature
Current
Royal Rumble	Features the Royal Rumble match.
Elimination Chamber	Features the Elimination Chamber match.
Worlds Collide	An interpromotional event featuring wrestlers from both WWE and Lucha Libre AAA Worldwide. The event was previously themed around interbrand competition between the NXT and NXT UK brands. The event initially included an interbrand single-elimination tournament, featuring wrestlers from the NXT, NXT UK, and 205 Live brands. There was also a four-episode miniseries of the same name spun off from the original event in 2019 that aired exclusively on the WWE Network and also involved Raw and SmackDown.
Money in the Bank	Features the Money in the Bank ladder match.
Night of Champions	Features championship matches. From 2007 to 2015, the theme was that every active WWE championship of the main roster was defended; this event was replaced by Clash of Champions in 2016 with a similar concept. Night of Champions was reinstated in 2023, but not every main roster championship was defended. Since 2025, the event features the King of the Ring and Queen of the Ring tournaments.
Evolution	Female-only event themed around WWE's various women's divisions.
Crown Jewel	Features the Crown Jewel Championship matches, which see world champions in direct head-to-head competition.
Survivor Series	Features elimination-style matches, particularly the traditional Survivor Series match. Carried an interbrand theme from 2016 to 2021, and then themed on the WarGames match beginning in 2022.
Deadline	Features the Iron Survivor Challenge matches.
Former
The Wrestling Classic	Featured The Wrestling Classic, a single-elimination tournament.
Invasion	All of the matches were between the WWF and The Alliance of WCW and ECW.
One Night Stand	The pay-per-views were themed around the original Extreme Championship Wrestling promotion and consisted of various hardcore-based matches. Extreme Rules replaced this event in 2009 and continued the concept of featuring various hardcore-based matches.
Taboo Tuesday, later Cyber Sunday	Fans were able to vote on the matches, such as opponents or stipulations.
Breaking Point	Featured matches with "give up" stipulations, such as submission matches and I Quit matches.
Fatal 4-Way	Featured Fatal 4-Way matches.
Bragging Rights	The Raw and SmackDown brands would compete against one another for the Bragging Rights trophy and a 14-man tag team match between the two brands would take place; following the return of the brand extension in 2016, Survivor Series took on the brand competition theme where Raw and SmackDown competed for brand supremacy until 2021 (NXT was also involved in 2019).
Greatest Royal Rumble	Featured the Greatest Royal Rumble match, a 50-man Royal Rumble match where the winner received the Greatest Royal Rumble trophy and championship belt.
Cruiserweight Classic Finale	The culmination of a 32-man single-elimination tournament featuring competitors 205 lbs. and under (designated as cruiserweights).
United Kingdom Championship Tournament	The event included a single-elimination tournament based around the United Kingdom Championship, featuring competitors from the United Kingdom and around the world.
Mae Young Classic Finale	The culmination of a 32-woman single-elimination tournament.
Clash of Champions	Every active WWE championship available to Raw and SmackDown was defended (205 Live was also involved in 2019).
TLC: Tables, Ladders & Chairs	At least one match was a Tables, Ladders, and Chairs match, while individual tables matches, ladder matches, and chairs matches would occasionally also take place. The 2014 event was promoted as "TLC: Tables, Ladders, Chairs... and Stairs" and included a steel stairs match.
NXT WarGames	Featured the WarGames match.
Bad Blood	Features the Hell in a Cell match.
Hell in a Cell	Featured the Hell in a Cell match.
Extreme Rules	Generally featured at least one Extreme Rules match, while other matches were variants of hardcore wrestling.
King and Queen of the Ring	Featured the King of the Ring and Queen of the Ring tournaments.

== See also ==
- List of major Lucha Libre AAA Worldwide events
- List of AEW PPV events
- List of ECW supercards and PPV events
- List of FMW supercards and PPV events
- List of GFW specials and PPV events
- List of MLW specials and PPV events
- List of NWA PPV events
- List of major NJPW events
- List of ROH PPV events
- List of TNA / Impact Wrestling PPV events
- List of TNA+ Specials
- List of WCCW supercard events
- List of WCW closed-circuit events and PPV events
- List of WCW Clash of the Champions shows
- List of WWE Saturday Night's Main Event shows
- List of WWE Tribute to the Troops shows
