= St. Louis Premium Outlets =

Shopping center in Chesterfield, Missouri, U.S.

- Location: Chesterfield, Missouri, U.S.
- Coordinates: 38.6775°N 90.6614°W
- Address: 18521 Outlet Blvd, 63005
- Opened: August 22, 2013; 13 years ago
- Previous names: Spirit of St. Louis Outlets (initially planned)
- Developer: Simon Property Group; Woodmont Outlets; EWB Development
- Manager: Simon Premium Outlets
- Owner: Simon Property Group (60%); The Woodmont Company (40%)
- Architect: The Collaborative Inc.
- Num. of stores: 90+ (at peak)
- Num. of anchor tenants: 1 (Saks Off 5th)
- Floor area: 351,174 square feet (32,625.1 m^{2})
- Floors: 1
- Parking: Surface parking lot with 2,920 free spaces
- Website: www.premiumoutlets.com/outlet/st-louis
- Building details

Design and construction
- Main contractor: Hardin Construction Company; T.J. Wies Contracting, Inc.

St. Louis Premium Outlets is a regional outlet center in Chesterfield, Missouri, United States, a suburb of St. Louis. It is owned and managed by Premium Outlets, a division of Simon Property Group.

The complex opened in 2013, primarily developed by Simon to compete with Taubman Prestige Outlets, which also debuted in 2013. Taubman Prestige Outlets eventually closed throughout 2017 and 2019.

== History ==
=== 2011–2014: Development and opening ===
In October 2011, Woodmont Outlets, the outlet mall division of the Texas-based Woodmont Company, partnered with EWB Development, and announced that a new outlet center would be developed in the Chesterfield Valley, initially known as Spirit of St. Louis Outlets. The project was estimated to attract shoppers as far as 150 miles, and the mall would be located on 55 acres (22 ha) on the south side of Interstate 64 near the Spirit Airport, and almost four miles west of the Chesterfield Commons power center. Officials expected the project to create over 2,500 jobs, and generate $265 million in annual sales.

==== Mall race ====
Spirit of St. Louis would cost $85 million and have 550,000 square feet (51,000 m^{2}), while around the same time, T-O Ventures, a partnership consisting of Taubman Centers and OutletPartners LLC, was planning to develop Taubman Prestige Outlets across Chesterfield Commons and the traditional, enclosed Chesterfield Mall. In November 2011, Woodmont and EWB formed a joint venture with Simon Property Group of Indianapolis, Indiana, which took a 60% ownership stake in the project, which was renamed St. Louis Premium Outlets. The mall would anchor the Chesterfield Blue Valley mixed-use development, near the Daniel Boone Bridge.

Taubman and Simon engaged in an "outlet war" to scare off one another. On April 3, 2012, it was announced that Saks Fifth Avenue Off 5th had signed on to anchor St. Louis Premium Outlets, making it the first Off 5th location in Missouri. The mall's first phase was expected to open in the fall of 2013, with 350,000 square feet (33,000 m^{2}). Construction began on July 11, 2012, expected to create 800 jobs. Simon and its partners formally closed on the 50-acre (20 ha) parcel purchase from Chesterfield Blue Valley LLC on September 26, 2012.

By December 12, 2012, Simon reported that 30% of the walls for the mall were up. St. Louis Premium Outlets had its grand opening celebration on August 22, 2013 at 10:00 a.m. CDT, being 100% leased with 90 stores across 350,000 square feet. Thousands of shoppers showed up before opening, creating long lines just to enter stores, many of which were new to the Greater St. Louis area, such as Michael Kors, Nike, Under Armour, and Armani Outlet.

The mall featured a small, enclosed food court. On September 30, 2014, a 70,000-square-foot (6,500 m^{2}) Phase II expansion was announced, though this never materialized.

=== 2020–present ===
On June 17, 2020, it was reported that St. Louis Premium Outlets, alongside competing malls such as the Saint Louis Galleria, have been severely impacted by the COVID-19 pandemic. The mall appeared on a commercial mortgage-backed securities (CMBS) watchlist after the property faced mounting revenue pressures as lockdowns, capacity restrictions, and an overall decline in consumer foot traffic resulted in low sales.

Simon Property Group announced four major additions in August 2022 to push tenancy past 85 businesses. In July 2024, the property's commercial mortgage loans, which was totaling around $67 million ahead of an October 2024 majority date, transferred to a special servicer due to imminent maturity default. In late April 2026, Simon listed 10 acres (4.0 ha) for sale near the mall for potential redevelopment. As of October 2026, the loan's maturity was later extended to October 2027 alongside a principal curtailment, and the loan returned to the master servicer by January 2026.

== See also ==
- Tampa Premium Outlets – also designed by The Collaborative Inc.
