= The District of St. Louis =

Entertainment complex in Chesterfield, Missouri, U.S.

- Outlets under construction (June 2013)
- Location: Chesterfield, Missouri, U.S.
- Coordinates: 38.669981°N 90.582962°W
- Address: 17057 N Outer 40 Rd, 63005
- Opened: August 2, 2013; 13 years ago
- Renovated: 2019–2023
- Closed: c. 2017–2019 (outlet store lease expirations)
- Previous names: Taubman Prestige Outlets Chesterfield (2013–2018); Chesterfield Outlets (initially planned 2010–2012, temporarily reused 2018–2019)
- Developer: Taubman Centers; OutletPartners LLC
- Manager: The Staenburg Group
- Owner: The Staenburg Group
- Architect: Design Collective
- Num. of stores: 25+ (at peak)
- Num. of anchor tenants: 3
- Floor area: 299,993 square feet (27,870.3 m^{2})
- Floors: 1 (2 in The Factory)
- Parking: Surface parking lot
- Website: www.thedistrictstl.com
- Building details

General information
- Type: Outlet mall (2013–2019); Mixed-use (2019–present)

Design and construction
- Main contractor: The Weitz Company

Renovating team
- Architects: HDA Architects; O'Toole Design Associates
- Renovating firm: The Staenburg Group
- Main contractor: Keystone Construction Company

The District of St. Louis, also known as The District STL or The District Chesterfield, is an entertainment complex in Chesterfield, a suburb of St. Louis, Missouri, United States.

The complex originally opened in 2013 as Taubman Prestige Outlets Chesterfield or simply Taubman Prestige Outlets, primarily developed by Taubman Centers to compete with Simon Property Group's St. Louis Premium Outlets, which also debuted in 2013.

In 2018, Taubman sold the outlet mall to the Staenburg Group, which renamed it Chesterfield Outlets before redeveloping it in phases as The District. The Factory opened later in 2021, followed by The Hub in 2023.

== History ==
=== 2010–2012: Planning and construction ===
In 2010, Bloomfield Hills, Michigan-based mall developer Taubman Centers announced plans to enter the outlet market, targeting regions sufficient for generating high sales per square foot. For this to be possible, Taubman formed a joint venture called T-O Ventures alongside OutletPartners LLC.

By May 2011, the developers selected a 49-to-60-acre (20 to 24 ha) parcel on North Outer 40 Drive, just east of Boone's Crossing in Chesterfield Valley, positioning the site directly across Interstate 64 from the Chesterfield Commons power center. The project was initially known as Chesterfield Outlets.

==== Mall race ====
By November 2011, a rival group, Simon Property Group of Indianapolis, Indiana, which teamed up with EWB Development and Woodmont Co. division Woodmont Outlets, proposed a competing outlet mall less than two miles west near the Daniel Boone Bridge as part of the Chesterfield Blue Valley development.

Simon and Taubman engaged in an "outlet war" to scare off one another. What was now called Taubman Prestige Outlets broke ground on April 5, 2012, set to include nearly 100 stores and 450,000 square feet (42,000 m^{2}). The site of the mall was across the enclosed, traditional Chesterfield Mall. After securing final federal, state, and local approvals, formal groundbreaking was held on July 25, 2012; Taubman Prestige Outlets would be a 49-acre (20 ha) shopping center, with an expected opening date of October 24, 2013.

After Simon announced St. Louis Premium Outlets would open in August 2013, Taubman sped up construction and announced in September 2012 that Prestige Outlets would also open in August 2013. Building walls began rising on the site in October 2012. On October 9, 2012, Taubman appointed Colleen O'Neill, a former marketing director at Saks Fifth Avenue, as the center's general manager to oversee pre-opening operations and leasing.

=== 2013–2017: Opening and decline ===
The $150 million Taubman Prestige Outlets had its grand opening celebration on August 2, 2013, at 9:15 a.m. CDT. Roughly 2,000 shoppers lined up before the mall officially opened to kick off Missouri's back-to-school sales tax holiday weekend. To attract early morning crowds, Taubman handed out $25 gift cards to the first 1,000 shoppers in line, while individual stores also ran doorbuster giveaways, such as free phone chargers at Cellairis, alongside live afternoon music and entertainment.

However, because construction was rushed, only 47 stores were ready to open on August 2 out of the 310,000-square-foot (29,000 m^{2}) center's roughly 75 to 80 storefronts, such as Brooks Brothers Factory Store, J.Crew Factory, Abercrombie & Fitch Outlet, Gap Factory Store, Famous Footwear Outlet, and Polo Ralph Lauren Factory Store. By December 16, 2013, Taubman Prestige Outlets saw a drop in foot traffic. On March 13, 2014, it was announced that four tenants would join the mall, being Coach Factory Store, Coldwater Creek, Justice & Brothers, and The Uniform Outlets.

On November 12, 2014, four more new stores were announced to join the mall by the spring of 2015, being Kate Spade Saturday, Talbots, Hugo Boss Factory Store, and Forever Flawless. A 22,000 sq ft (2,000 m^{2}) H&M would open in December 2014. By the announcement, the mall featured Foot Locker, Kid's Foot Locker, Sunglass Hut, Hartstring's Kids Apparel, and Pro Image Sports. Nadoz Bakery + Cafe abruptly closed on January 9, 2016, after initially debuting in February 2014. As a result, Taubman filed a lawsuit against the restaurant for breaching its lease by vacating its 2,814 sq ft (261.4 m^{2}) space years before its contract ended, and St. Louis County Circuit Court Judge Ellen Sue Levy ruled in June 2017 that Nadoz Prestige LLC owed Taubman Prestige Outlets $1.3 million.

By January 2017, roughly 16 storefronts at the mall were vacant.

=== 2018–2023: Redevelopment as The District ===
In April 2018, Taubman Centers sold Prestige Outlets to the Staenburg Group, which had plans to redevelop it into a mixed-use entertainment and shopping complex, though Taubman continues to lease the land underneath the buildings. After the acquisition, the mall was temporarily renamed Chesterfield Outlets. On June 4, 2018, Staenberg Group announced that Taubman Prestige Outlets would be rebranded to "The District".

A three-story, 65,000 sq ft (6,000 m^{2}) Topgolf opened near the property on August 3, 2018, at 9:00 a.m, as Topgolf's first location in Missouri, and their 44th location worldwide, with 102 climate-controlled hitting bays. On December 2, 2019, TSG announced plans to build a music venue inside the complex known as The Factory, and ground was broken on the venue by October 27, 2020, with an opening date planned for 2021. The venue opened on July 16, 2021, with Deadmau5 being the first performer to be booked for the venue which had sold out days prior to the concert.

Main Event Entertainment opened at The District on September 1, 2021, occupying a 50,000-square-foot (4,600 m^{2}) space. Construction on The Hub, a $4 million central courtyard and food hall that would serve as the second phase of The District, started on September 27, 2022, with the demolition of the former Polo Ralph Lauren building. The Hub had its grand opening on August 31, 2023. IT'SUGAR opened at the complex in December 2024, occupying a 3,000 sq ft (280 m^{2}) space. It was the candy store chain's first location in the St. Louis area. Oaxaca Margarita Bar & Grill opened in the spring of 2026.

== See also ==
- St. Louis Mills – former outlet mall in Hazelwood
