= The Factory at The District =

Concert venue located in Chesterfield, Missouri

- Interactive map of The Factory at The District
- Address: 17105 N Outer 40 Rd
- Location: The District STL; Chesterfield, Missouri
- Coordinates: 38°40′19.092″N 90°35′34.224″W
- Owner: The Staenberg Group
- Capacity: 3,000

Construction
- Opened: July 16, 2021

Website
- Official website

The Factory at the District is a music venue located in Chesterfield, Missouri and is owned and operated by The Staenberg Group.

== History ==
In April 2018, it was announced that the Staenberg Group had acquired the Taubman Prestige Outlets shopping center in Chesterfield, Missouri with plans to redevelop it into a mixed-use entertainment and shopping complex. On June 4, 2018, Staenberg Group announced that the mall would be rebranded to The District. On December 2, 2019, the Staenberg Group announced plans to build a music venue inside the complex named The Factory. In late 2020, ground was broken on the venue with an opening date planned for 2021. The venue opened on July 16, 2021 with Deadmau5 being the first performer to be booked for the venue which had sold out days prior to the concert.

On September 13, 2024, the professional wrestling promotion World Wrestling Entertainment (WWE) announced that due to low ticket sales, they would be moving a live televised NXT event which was originally scheduled to be held at the Enterprise Center on October 8, 2024 in St. Louis, Missouri to The Factory. WWE's NXT event at The Factory featured several notable matches including Axiom and Nathan Frazer defending the NXT Tag Team Championship against A-Town Down Under (Austin Theory and Grayson Waller), Oba Femi defending the NXT North American Championship against Tony D'Angelo, and Randy Orton fighting against Je'Von Evans in a rare NXT in-ring appearance. On April 4, 2026, WWE returned to The Factory At The District to present the 2026 edition of NXT's Stand & Deliver premium live event which was streamed live on YouTube and Netflix along with featuring title defenses for the NXT North American men's and Women's championships, the NXT Tag Team Championship, and the NXT men's and Women's championships.
