= Backlash (2017) =

WWE pay-per-view and livestreaming event

- Promotional poster featuring Shinsuke Nakamura
- Promotion: WWE
- Brand: SmackDown
- Date: May 21, 2017
- City: Rosemont, Illinois
- Venue: Allstate Arena
- Attendance: 9,800

WWE event chronology
← Previous; NXT TakeOver: Chicago	Next → Extreme Rules

Backlash chronology
← Previous; 2016	Next → 2018

The 2017 Backlash was a professional wrestling pay-per-view (PPV) and livestreaming event produced by WWE, held exclusively for wrestlers from the promotion's main roster brand, SmackDown. It was the 13th Backlash and took place on May 21, 2017, at the Allstate Arena in the Chicago suburb of Rosemont, Illinois.

Eight matches were contested at the event, including one on the Kickoff pre-show. In the main event, Jinder Mahal defeated Randy Orton to win his first WWE Championship, becoming the first wrestler of Indian descent to win the title. In other prominent matches, Kevin Owens retained the United States Championship against AJ Styles, and The Usos (Jey Uso and Jimmy Uso) defeated Breezango (Fandango and Tyler Breeze) to retain the SmackDown Tag Team Championship. The event was also notable for the televised main roster in-ring debut of Shinsuke Nakamura, who defeated Dolph Ziggler in the opening bout.

This was the second Backlash held at the Allstate Arena, after the 2001 event, and it returned Backlash to the springtime, after the 2016 event was held in September. This was also the final brand-exclusive Backlash, as although the 2018 event was originally planned to be Raw-exclusive, brand-exclusive PPV and livestreaming events for the main roster were discontinued following WrestleMania 34 in April that year.

== Production ==
=== Background ===
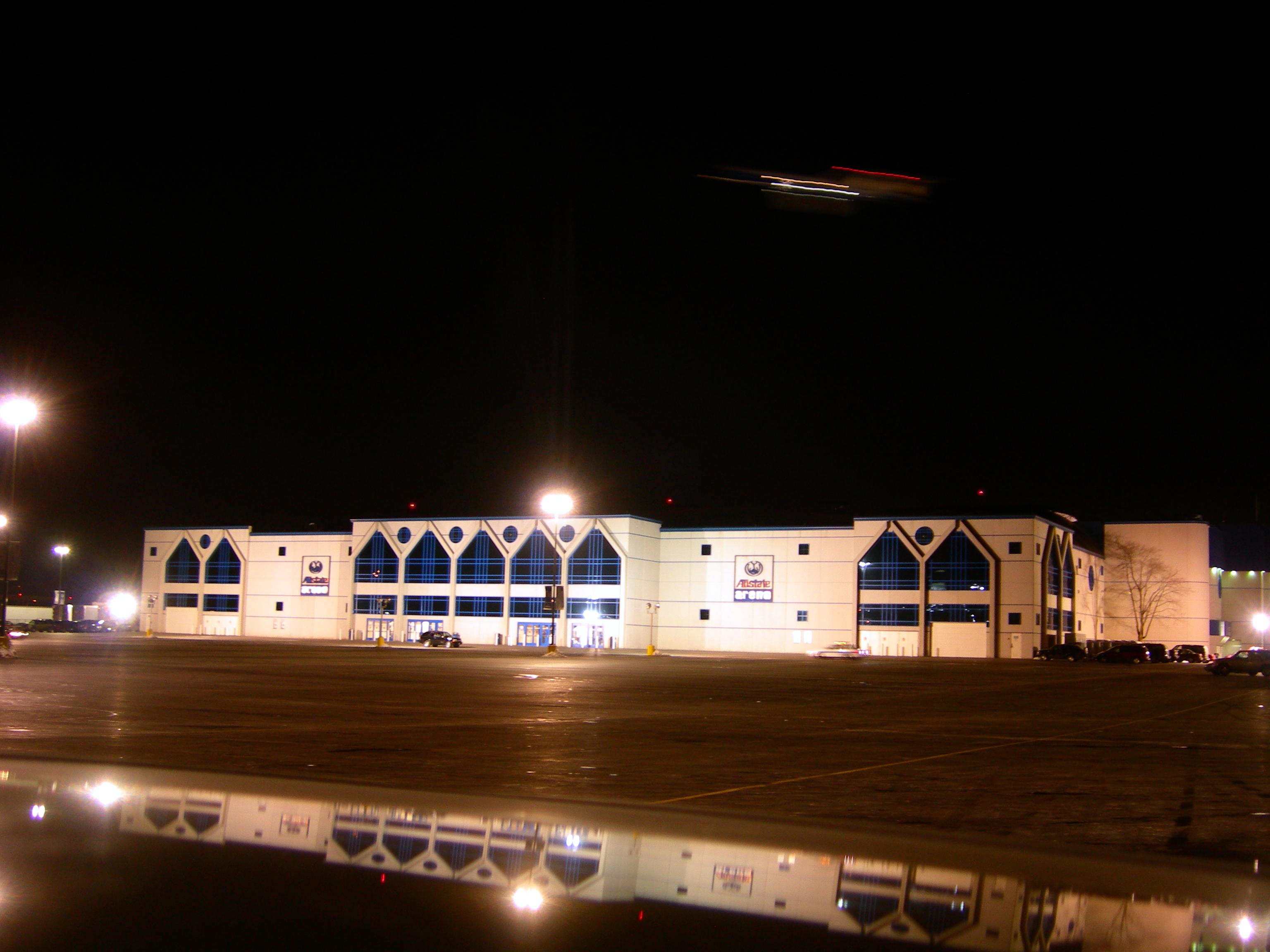
The 13th Backlash was the second time for the event to be held at the Allstate Arena in the Chicago suburb of Rosemont, Illinois, after 2001.

Backlash is a professional wrestling event that was established by WWE in 1999. It was held annually from 1999 to 2009, but was then discontinued until it was reinstated in 2016. The event was originally broadcast exclusively via pay-per-view (PPV) before it began simultaneously livestreaming on the WWE Network in 2016. The original concept of the event was based around the backlash from WWE's flagship event, WrestleMania, but this theme was dropped with its revival in 2016. Announced on March 6, 2017, the 13th Backlash was scheduled to be held on May 21, 2017, at the Allstate Arena in the Chicago suburb of Rosemont, Illinois, which was the second Backlash to be held in May, after the 2005 event, subsequently returning Backlash to the springtime after the 2016 event was held in September, and it was also the second Backlash held at this venue, after the 2001 event. Like the 2016 event, it featured wrestlers exclusively from the SmackDown brand. Tickets went on sale on March 18 through Ticketmaster.

=== Storylines ===
The event comprised eight matches, including one on the Kickoff pre-show, that resulted from scripted storylines. Results were predetermined by WWE's writers on the SmackDown brand, while storylines were produced on WWE's weekly television show, SmackDown Live.

At WrestleMania 33, Randy Orton defeated Bray Wyatt to win his ninth WWE Championship. On the post-WrestleMania SmackDown, Wyatt challenged Orton to a "House of Horrors" match; after Wyatt moved to Raw as a result of the Superstar Shake-up, the match was made a non-title match and scheduled for Raw's pay-per-view Payback. On the April 18 episode of SmackDown, Jinder Mahal, who had moved over from Raw, defeated Dolph Ziggler, Mojo Rawley, Erick Rowan, Luke Harper, and Sami Zayn, who also moved over from Raw, in a six-pack challenge to become the number one contender for the WWE Championship at Backlash. During the match, Mahal received help from NXT's The Bollywood Boyz, who made their SmackDown debut as The Singh Brothers (Samir and Sunil Singh). The following week, Orton defeated Rowan in a no disqualification match and was afterwards attacked by Mahal and The Singh Brothers; Mahal subsequently stole the WWE Championship belt. At Payback on April 30 during Orton's match against Wyatt, Orton easily fought off an attack by The Singh Brothers, but then Mahal attacked him with the title belt, costing Orton his match. On the following SmackDown, as Mahal was having a photo shoot with the stolen WWE Championship, SmackDown Commissioner Shane McMahon appeared and retrieved the title belt from Mahal and later returned it to Orton. On the May 9 episode, Orton was interrupted by Mahal, who stated that he would be taking the championship back to his home country of India where they would erect a statue of him. The two were later involved in a six-man tag team match that ended with Mahal pinning Orton. The following week, after Orton defeated Baron Corbin, Mahal appeared. Orton was then attacked by The Singh Brothers, but fended them off. Mahal then attacked Orton with the Khallas.

At WrestleMania 33, Kevin Owens defeated Chris Jericho to win his first United States Championship. On the post-WrestleMania Raw, Jericho was granted a rematch for the title at Raw's pay-per-view Payback, but the following week, Owens was moved to the SmackDown brand as a result of the Superstar Shake-up. SmackDown General Manager Daniel Bryan decided that if Jericho won the title at Payback, he would also transfer to SmackDown. Also on the April 11 episode of SmackDown, AJ Styles defeated Sami Zayn and Baron Corbin in a triple threat match to earn an opportunity for the United States Championship at Backlash. Over the next couple of weeks, Styles defeated Corbin in back-to-back matches, while Owens sat at ringside on commentary. After Styles defeated Corbin on the April 25 episode, Owens attacked Styles and Corbin joined in on the attack. Zayn came out for the save and took out Corbin, but was overpowered by Owens. Afterwards on Talking Smack, Corbin attacked Zayn and shoved an official. He was subsequently suspended for one week. At Payback on April 30, Jericho defeated Owens to win the United States Championship, thus transferring Jericho to SmackDown. On the following episode of SmackDown, however, Owens defeated Jericho to regain the title, making him the defending champion against Styles at Backlash. After the match, Owens continued to beat and injure Jericho, taking him out of action. On the May 9 episode, Owens interrupted a segment between WWE Champion Randy Orton and Jinder Mahal and claimed that he would eventually become the face of WWE. Styles then came out, followed by Corbin and Zayn, who attacked Corbin. A brawl ensued that resulted in a six-man tag team match where the team of Owens, Corbin, and Mahal defeated Styles, Zayn, and Orton. The following week, Owens hosted his own Highlight Reel with Mahal as his guest, but before Mahal could come out, Owens was interrupted by Styles. Styles then faced Mahal, but was defeated by Mahal due to an attack from Owens while the referee was distracted by The Singh Brothers. Later in the show, Zayn was granted a match against Corbin at Backlash. Corbin then appeared and attacked Zayn.

On the April 11 episode of SmackDown, The Usos (Jey Uso and Jimmy Uso) retained the SmackDown Tag Team Championship against American Alpha (Chad Gable and Jason Jordan). After the match, The Shining Stars (Primo and Epico Colón) appeared, revealing they had been moved over from Raw and renamed to The Colóns. They attacked American Alpha, and defeated them the following week. On the April 25 episode of SmackDown, Breezango (Fandango and Tyler Breeze) won a Beat the Clock Challenge to become number one contenders: American Alpha defeated The Colóns, but Breezango defeated The Ascension (Konnor and Viktor) in a shorter time, thus earning a title opportunity at Backlash.

On the April 4 episode of SmackDown, NXT's Shinsuke Nakamura made his main roster debut by interrupting The Miz and Maryse, who were both transferred to Raw the following week. On the next SmackDown, Nakamura interrupted Dolph Ziggler's in-ring promo. Ziggler attempted a superkick on Nakamura, but Nakamura countered and Ziggler retreated. On the April 25 episode, Ziggler interrupted Nakamura's in-ring interview by Renee Young. After the two traded barbs, Ziggler attacked Nakamura, who retaliated with an Inverted Exploder Suplex on Ziggler, who retreated. It was then announced that Nakamura would have his SmackDown in-ring debut at Backlash against an unknown opponent. On the May 2 episode of SmackDown, Ziggler criticized Commissioner Shane McMahon and General Manager Daniel Bryan for hyping Nakamura for Backlash, even though he had not had a match on an episode of SmackDown yet. The following week, Ziggler cut a promo touting his accomplishments before calling out Nakamura. Nakamura called for a referee, but before the match could begin, Ziggler backed out and said he would face Nakamura at Backlash and then attacked Nakamura, but Nakamura overpowered Ziggler.

At WrestleMania 33, Naomi won a six-pack challenge to win her second SmackDown Women's Championship, and she subsequently retained the title against former champion Alexa Bliss on the post-WrestleMania SmackDown. As a result of the Superstar Shake-up, Bliss and Mickie James were moved to the Raw brand, and Charlotte Flair and Tamina, who was a free agent, were moved to the SmackDown brand. The following week, Flair demanded a title shot. She was confronted by the champion, and SmackDown Commissioner Shane McMahon decided that if Flair could defeat Naomi in a non-title match, she would be granted a title match the following week, which she did. This angered Natalya, Tamina, and Carmella (with James Ellsworth), as they each felt that they should have been the number one contender. The following week, Flair and Naomi's title match ended after they were both attacked by Natalya, Tamina, and Carmella. On the May 2 episode, Flair, now a face, was attacked backstage by the three heels, now calling themselves The Welcoming Committee, who also tried to convince Becky Lynch to join them. Naomi and Flair then teamed up, but were defeated by Natalya and Carmella. After the match, The Welcoming Committee teamed up on Flair and Naomi. Lynch then came out and acted like she was going to join the three, but then attacked them, but got overwhelmed. The following week, during a match between Natalya and Lynch, Flair kept Naomi from attacking Tamina, who was trying to cause a distraction, and Natalya got the win. Later, after some arguing backstage, Flair, Naomi, and Lynch got on the same page, and were scheduled to face The Welcoming Committee at Backlash.

On the post-WrestleMania SmackDown, The Wyatt Family (Bray Wyatt and Erick Rowan) were defeated by WWE Champion Randy Orton and former Wyatt Family member Luke Harper. The following week, Wyatt was moved to the Raw brand as a result of the Superstar Shake-up, effectively disbanding The Wyatt Family. Rowan and Harper then both competed in the WWE Championship number one contender's six-pack challenge, but were unsuccessful. On the May 9 episode of SmackDown, Rowan defeated Harper in a singles match. The following week on Talking Smack, Rowan said that he disliked the fact that Harper had left The Wyatt Family. He said that although he defeated Harper the previous week, he felt that Harper deserved more punishment and requested a match against him at Backlash, to which Commissioner Shane McMahon granted.

On the April 4 episode of SmackDown, NXT's Tye Dillinger made his main roster debut and defeated Curt Hawkins, who was transferred to the Raw brand the following week. On the April 11 episode, former Vaudevillain Aiden English began a solo career, but was defeated by Dillinger, who also defeated him the next week. On May 16, a match between the two was scheduled for the Backlash Kickoff pre-show.

== Event ==
Other on-screen personnel
Role:	Name:
English commentators	Tom Phillips
English commentators	John "Bradshaw" Layfield
English commentators	Byron Saxton
Spanish commentators	Carlos Cabrera
Spanish commentators	Marcelo Rodríguez
German commentators	Tim Haber
German commentators	Calvin Knie
Ring announcer	Greg Hamilton
Referees	Danilo Anfibio
Referees	Jason Ayers
Referees	Mike Chioda
Referees	Dan Engler
Referees	Ryan Tran
Backstage interviewers	Dasha Fuentes
Backstage interviewers	Kayla Braxton
Pre-show panel	Renee Young
Pre-show panel	Peter Rosenberg
Pre-show panel	Booker T
Talking Smack panel	Renee Young
Talking Smack panel	Peter Rosenberg

=== Pre-Show ===
During the Backlash Kickoff pre-show, Tye Dillinger faced Aiden English. Dillinger performed the "Tye Breaker" on English to win the match.

=== Preliminary matches ===
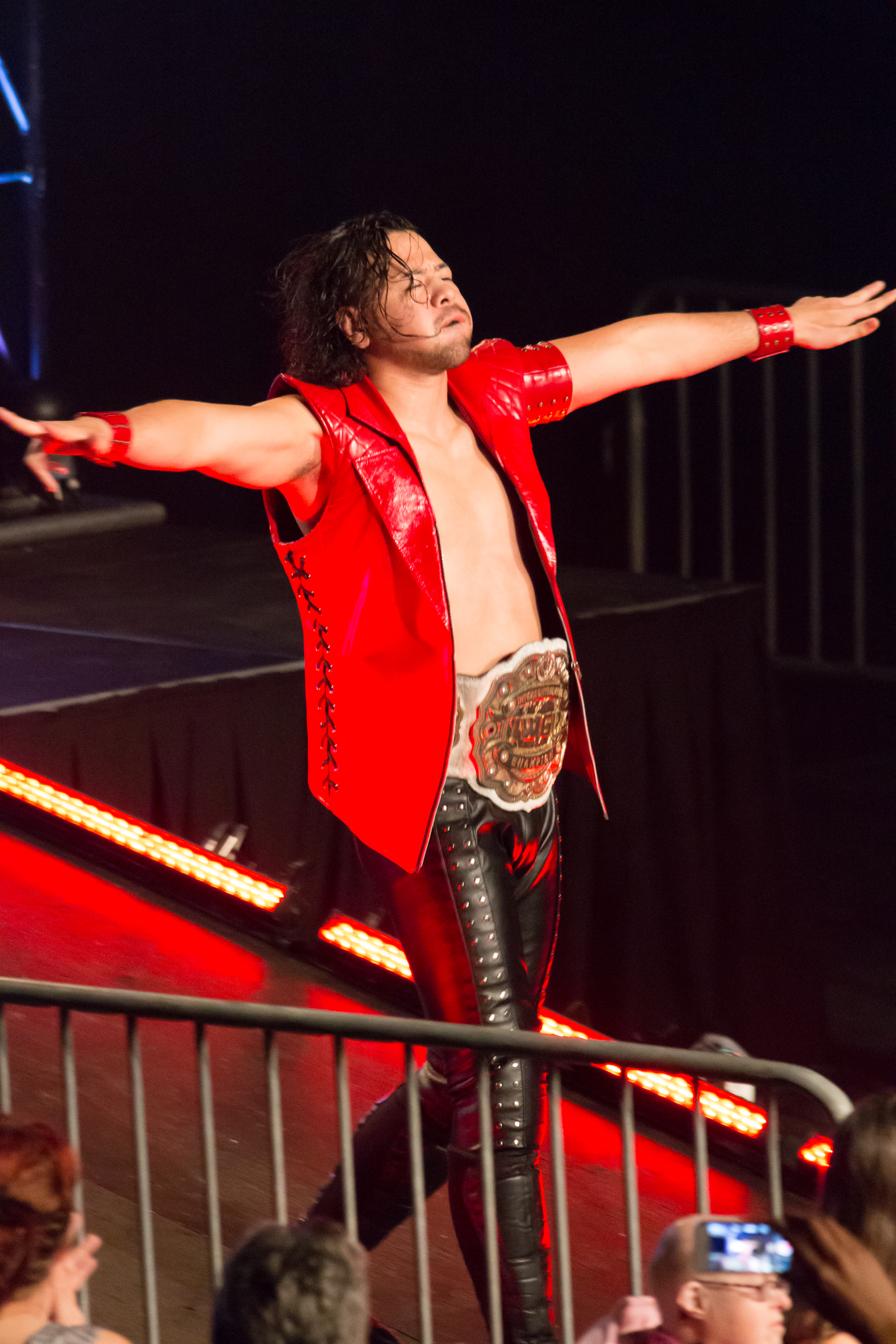
Shinsuke Nakamura made his televised main roster in-ring debut at the event and defeated Dolph Ziggler.

The actual pay-per-view opened with Shinsuke Nakamura facing Dolph Ziggler. Ziggler performed a "Zig Zag" on Nakamura for a near-fall. Ziggler performed a superkick to the back of Nakamura's neck for a near-fall. In the end, Nakamura performed an Inverted Exploder Suplex and a "Kinshasa" on Ziggler to win the match.

Next, The Usos (Jey Uso and Jimmy Uso) defended the SmackDown Tag Team Championship against Breezango (Fandango and Tyler Breeze). During the match, Breeze disguised himself as a janitor and an elderly woman, which allowed him to get some offense on The Usos. The match ended when Jey performed a Superkick on Fandango to retain the titles.

Afterwards, Sami Zayn faced Baron Corbin. In the end, Zayn performed a "Helluva Kick" on Corbin to win the match.

Later, SmackDown Women's Champion Naomi, Charlotte Flair, and Becky Lynch faced The Welcoming Committee (Natalya, Tamina, and Carmella). In the climax, Natalya forced Lynch to submit to the "Sharpshooter" to win the match.

Next, Kevin Owens defended the United States Championship against AJ Styles. In the end, Styles performed a Phenomenal Forearm off the barricade on Owens. As Styles attempted a Styles Clash atop the announce table, Owens countered, trapping Styles' leg in the announce table. Styles was eventually counted out, thus Owens retained the title.

In the penultimate match, Luke Harper faced Erick Rowan. The match ended when Harper performed a "Discus Clothesline" on Rowan to win the match.

=== Main event ===
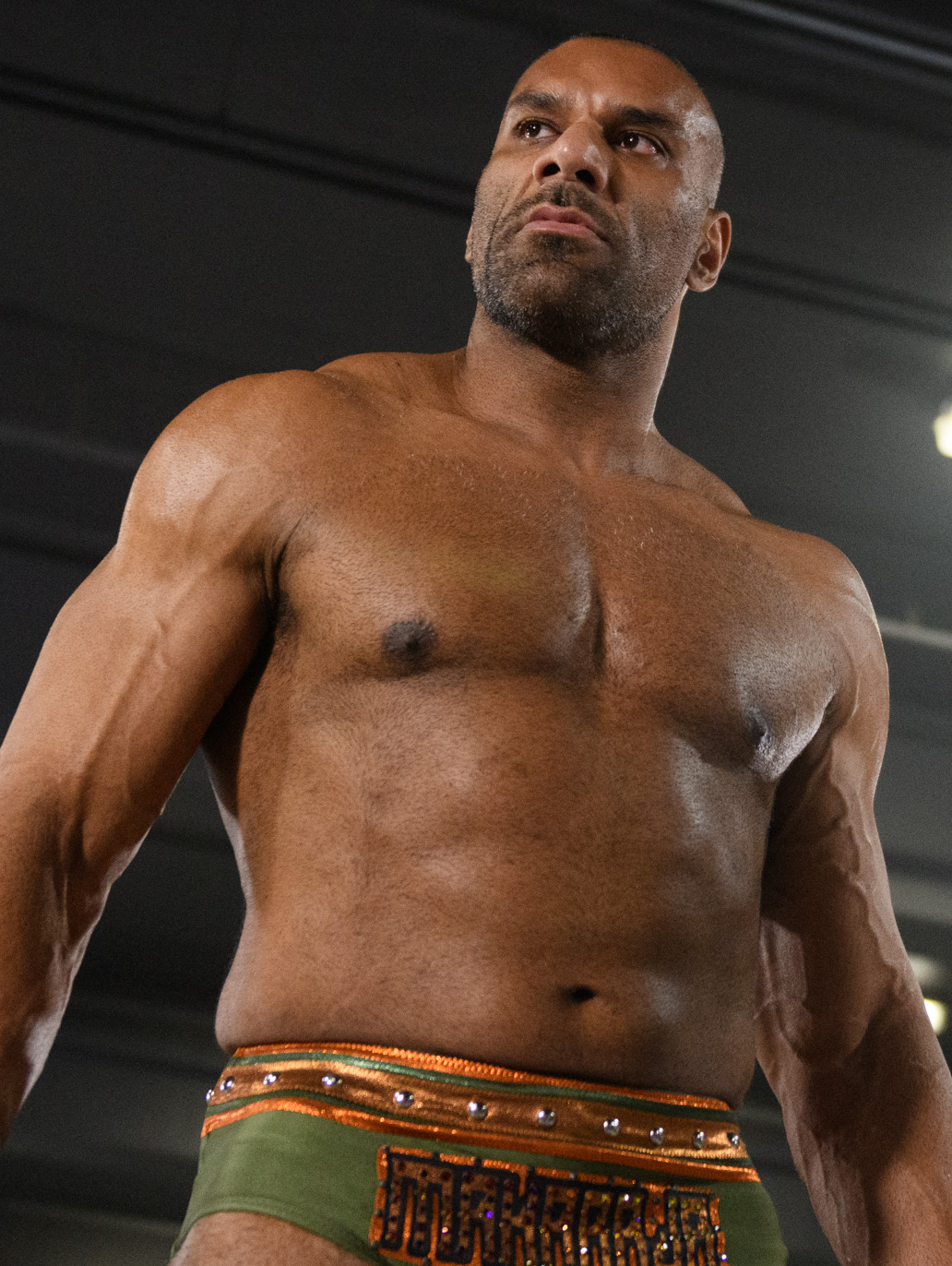
Jinder Mahal defeated Randy Orton in the main event to win the WWE Championship, thus becoming the first wrestler of Indian descent to win the title. WWE also recognizes Mahal as the 50th WWE Champion.

In the main event, Randy Orton defended the WWE Championship against Jinder Mahal. Orton performed an "RKO" on Mahal but The Singh Brothers (Samir and Sunil Singh), pulled Mahal out of the ring. Orton performed Belly-to-Back Suplexes onto the announce tables and an Elevated DDT on the Singh Brothers. Mahal then performed the "Khallas" on Orton to win his first WWE Championship, becoming the first wrestler of Indian descent to win the title.

== Aftermath ==
On the post-Backlash SmackDown, Commissioner Shane McMahon announced that Randy Orton invoked his championship rematch against Jinder Mahal for Money in the Bank. Later in the show, Mahal celebrated with his new championship in Punjabi style.

Shane McMahon also announced the five participants for the Money in the Bank ladder match at Money in the Bank with the contract being for a WWE Championship match: AJ Styles, Baron Corbin, Sami Zayn, Dolph Ziggler, and Shinsuke Nakamura. United States Champion Kevin Owens complained that he should also be in the match since he defeated Styles at Backlash. Shane then decided to add Owens to the Money in the Bank match. A rematch between Corbin and Zayn was then scheduled that Zayn won, as well as a tag team match where Styles and Nakamura defeated Owens and Ziggler.

In the tag team division, Tyler Breeze defeated Jey Uso and Fandango defeated Jimmy Uso. The two teams then immediately had a SmackDown Tag Team Championship rematch that The Usos won. The following week, after declaring that no team could defeat them, The Usos were interrupted by The New Day (Big E, Kofi Kingston, and Xavier Woods)–their first appearance on SmackDown since moving to the brand during the Superstar Shake-up–and The Usos were scheduled to defend their titles against The New Day at Money in the Bank.

Charlotte Flair and Becky Lynch teamed up and defeated Natalya and Carmella. Later backstage, Natalya asked Shane McMahon for a SmackDown Women's Championship match, followed by Carmella, Becky, Tamina, and Charlotte, who each felt that they should have a title opportunity. Shane then scheduled an elimination fatal five-way between them for the next SmackDown where the winner would face Naomi for the title at Money in the Bank. However, the match did not happen as all five women attacked each other. Shane then scheduled the five to compete in the first-ever Women's Money in the Bank ladder match with the contract being for a SmackDown Women's Championship match.

The 2017 Backlash would be the final to be brand-exclusive, as although the 2018 event was originally planned to be held for Raw, WWE discontinued brand-exclusive PPV and livestreaming events for the main roster following WrestleMania 34 in April that year.

== Results ==
No.	Results	Stipulations	Times
1^{P}	Tye Dillinger defeated Aiden English by pinfall	Singles match	8:20
2	Shinsuke Nakamura defeated Dolph Ziggler by pinfall	Singles match	15:50
3	The Usos (Jey Uso and Jimmy Uso) (c) defeated Breezango (Fandango and Tyler Breeze) by pinfall	Tag team match for the WWE SmackDown Tag Team Championship	9:15
4	Sami Zayn defeated Baron Corbin by pinfall	Singles match	14:35
5	The Welcoming Committee (Carmella, Natalya, and Tamina) (with James Ellsworth) defeated Becky Lynch, Charlotte Flair, and Naomi by submission	Six-woman tag team match	10:05
6	Kevin Owens (c) defeated AJ Styles by countout	Singles match for the WWE United States Championship	21:10
7	Luke Harper defeated Erick Rowan by pinfall	Singles match	9:00
8	Jinder Mahal (with The Singh Brothers) defeated Randy Orton (c) by pinfall	Singles match for the WWE Championship	15:45
(c) / – the champion(s) heading into the match; P / – the match was broadcast on the pre-show
