= Backlash (2020) =

WWE pay-per-view and livestreaming event

- Promotional poster featuring Edge and Randy Orton
- Promotion: WWE
- Brand(s): Raw; SmackDown
- Date: June 14, 2020 (Note: While the majority of the event aired live, the Edge vs. Randy Orton match was pre-recorded on June 7, 2020.)
- City: Orlando, Florida
- Venue: WWE Performance Center
- Attendance: 0 (behind closed doors) (Note: The event was held without a paying audience due to the COVID-19 pandemic in the United States, though a few WWE wrestlers and trainees appeared in the crowd.)
- Tagline: The Greatest Wrestling Match Ever

WWE event chronology
← Previous; NXT TakeOver: In Your House	Next → The Horror Show at Extreme Rules

Backlash chronology
← Previous; 2018	Next → 2021

The 2020 Backlash was a professional wrestling pay-per-view (PPV) and livestreaming event produced by WWE, held for wrestlers from the promotion's main roster brands, Raw and SmackDown. It was the 15th Backlash and aired on June 14, 2020, with all of the matches taking place at the WWE Performance Center in Orlando, Florida. While the majority of the event aired live, the main event was pre-recorded on June 7 and produced as a cinematic match.

The event was originally scheduled to take place in Kansas City, Missouri; however, the event had to be relocated due to the COVID-19 pandemic. Like WWE's other shows since mid-March, Backlash was moved to the WWE Performance Center, though unlike the previous shows, Backlash was not announced until after the start of the pandemic, which made it WWE's first PPV and livestreaming event to be announced during the pandemic. It was the first Backlash held since 2018 and the final to be titled "Backlash" until 2023 as both the 2021 and 2022 events were titled as "WrestleMania Backlash", which moved the event back to May and reinstated its original concept of featuring the backlash of WWE's flagship event, WrestleMania. This would also be the final Backlash to livestream on the American version of the WWE Network, which merged under Peacock in April 2021.

Seven matches were contested at the event, including one on the Kickoff pre-show. In the main event, Randy Orton defeated Edge in what WWE billed as "The Greatest Wrestling Match Ever". In the penultimate match, Drew McIntyre defeated Bobby Lashley to retain Raw's WWE Championship. In other prominent matches, Braun Strowman defeated The Miz and John Morrison in a handicap match to retain SmackDown's Universal Championship and Sheamus defeated Jeff Hardy.

== Production ==
=== Background ===
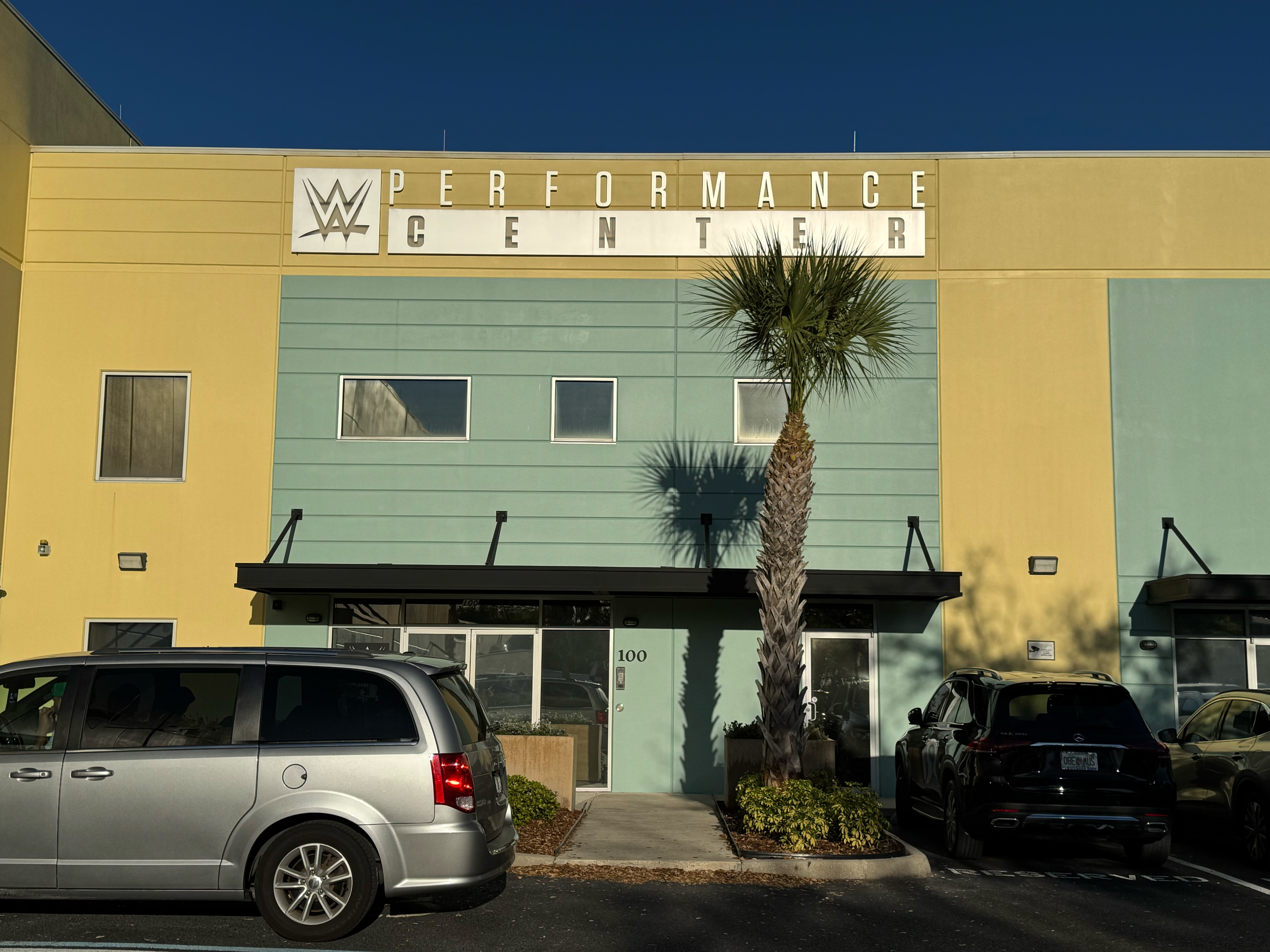
The 15th Backlash was originally planned to be held in Kansas City, Missouri, but instead took place at the WWE Performance Center in Orlando, Florida due to the COVID-19 pandemic.

Backlash is a professional wrestling event that was established by WWE in 1999. It was held annually from 1999 to 2009, but was then discontinued until it was reinstated in 2016. The event was originally broadcast exclusively via pay-per-view (PPV) before it began simultaneously livestreaming on the WWE Network in 2016. The original concept of the event was based around the backlash from WWE's flagship event, WrestleMania, but this theme was dropped with its revival in 2016. In 2019, Backlash was originally scheduled to be held in June, however, it was canceled and replaced by a one-off event called Stomping Grounds. Backlash was then reinstated for June 2020. It was the 15th Backlash and featured wrestlers from the Raw and SmackDown brand divisions.

==== Impact of the COVID-19 pandemic ====
In early March, Fightful Select reported that Backlash was planned to take place in Kansas City, Missouri on June 14, 2020. However, the event was not announced or promoted by WWE until May 10 during Money in the Bank; the advertisement had no reference to a city or venue, but confirmed it would be held on June 14. As a result, it was WWE's first PPV and livestreaming event to be announced after the start of the COVID-19 pandemic, which began affecting WWE's programming in mid-March. The pandemic forced the promotion to move the majority of its shows for Raw and SmackDown to a behind closed doors set at the WWE Performance Center in Orlando, Florida, though in late May, WWE began using Performance Center trainees to serve as the live audience.

Jeremy Lambert of Fightful originally reported that most of the matches were filmed in advance on June 7, hours before the Performance Center recruits were moved to Full Sail University in Winter Park, Florida to act as spectators for NXT TakeOver: In Your House that aired live that night. However, it was revealed by wrestling journalist Dave Meltzer the day after that only the Edge vs. Randy Orton match was pre-recorded. The recruits had a call-sheet at 8:30 a.m. Eastern Time that had them working both events until midnight on June 8. The rest of the Backlash card aired live on June 14.

The pre-recorded nature of the Edge vs. Randy Orton match allowed WWE to create a cinematic match, utilizing "unique production techniques and camera angles ... to add to the experience". One production technique was amplified crowd noise. Some spots in the match were also refilmed to get different angles, or to perfect certain moves. WWE also used the classic Madison Square Garden microphone that was used during WrestleMania I, with previous recordings of the late Howard Finkel (1950–2020) doing introductions for both wrestlers. Referee Charles Robinson also wore a classic light blue shirt with a black bowtie.

=== Storylines ===
The event comprised seven matches, including one on the Kickoff pre-show, that resulted from scripted storylines. Results were predetermined by WWE's writers on the Raw and SmackDown brands, while storylines were produced on WWE's weekly television shows, Monday Night Raw and Friday Night SmackDown.

At the Royal Rumble, WWE Hall of Famer Edge, who was forced to retire in April 2011 due to a neck injury, returned during the eponymous match and eliminated his old Rated-RKO tag team partner Randy Orton before his own elimination soon after. The feud became very personal over the next several weeks and culminated in a Last Man Standing match at WrestleMania 36 Part 2, where Edge defeated Orton. On the May 11 episode of Raw, both men made their first post-WrestleMania appearances. Orton said that the better man won at WrestleMania, but questioned Edge if the better wrestler had actually won. Noting that both the Royal Rumble and Last Man Standing matches were non-traditional, Orton challenged Edge to a traditional singles match at Backlash; Edge accepted the following week. WWE then billed the match as "The Greatest Wrestling Match Ever".

On the May 11 episode of Raw, Montel Vontavious Porter (MVP) approached Bobby Lashley backstage and praised him on his victory from earlier that night. However, he questioned why Lashley was facing a mid-carder while King Corbin was being invited over from SmackDown to face WWE Champion Drew McIntyre in a non-title match. MVP noted that Lashley had not had a WWE Championship opportunity since 2007's The Great American Bash and questioned when Lashley would show his true self. Lashley then aligned himself with MVP, which also enraged Lashley's storyline wife Lana. The following week, Lashley and MVP observed McIntyre's match against Corbin from the stage. After McIntyre defeated Corbin, McIntyre stated he wanted to face Lashley, who was held back by MVP. On the May 25 episode, it was confirmed that McIntyre would defend the WWE Championship against Lashley at Backlash.

At Money in the Bank, Braun Strowman defeated Bray Wyatt to retain the Universal Championship. On the May 15 episode of SmackDown, Strowman teamed with Mr. Money in the Bank Otis to defeat The Miz and John Morrison. The following week, Miz and Morrison lambasted Strowman for teaming with Otis (whom they made fun of the week prior) and then stated their loss the previous week was unfair. Miz taunted Strowman about his match with Wyatt and questioned if Wyatt was actually finished with Strowman. Morrison then seemingly issued a challenge for Miz to face Strowman, who accepted and defeated Miz. Following the match, Morrison challenged Strowman to defend the Universal Championship against himself and Miz in a handicap match at Backlash, which was made official.

At Money in the Bank, Asuka won the women's Money in the Bank ladder match. The following night on Raw, Raw Women's Champion Becky Lynch revealed that she was pregnant and announced a hiatus for maternity leave and that the ladder match was actually for the title instead of a contract that granted a championship match, thus Asuka became the new Raw Women's Champion. On the May 18 episode, Nia Jax, who was also in the ladder match, interrupted Asuka's title celebration and wanted a shot at the title. The following week, she won a triple threat match to become the number one contender against Asuka for the title at Backlash.

On the March 13 episode of SmackDown, Jeff Hardy returned for the first time since April 2019 and won his match. Throughout April, Sheamus would defeat enhancement talents with video packages showing the recovery of Hardy playing afterwards. This continued until the May 1 episode, where after Sheamus won his match, it was announced that Hardy would return the following week. There, Hardy was interviewed about his career before calling out Sheamus. After mocking Hardy's career, Sheamus brawled with Hardy, who got the upper hand. Hardy and Sheamus were then scheduled to face each other in a first round match for the vacant Intercontinental Championship on the May 22 episode, where Hardy won. However, the following week, Sheamus framed Hardy, who was arrested after crashing his car into Elias while under the influence. Later that night, after Sheamus lost his match, he was attacked by Hardy. On the June 5 episode, Hardy explained the situation when he was interrupted by Sheamus. Another brawl broke out with Sheamus getting the upper hand. It was then confirmed that Hardy and Sheamus would face each other at Backlash. On the final SmackDown before Backlash, a contract signing was held. After Hardy took a urine test, he told Sheamus that "it's better to be pissed off than pissed on" before throwing the urine in his face. It was then revealed that Hardy's test results came back negative.

On the May 11 episode of Raw, The IIconics (Billie Kay and Peyton Royce) returned for the first time since November 2019 and defeated WWE Women's Tag Team Champions Alexa Bliss and Nikki Cross in a non-title match. During the title match the following week, Bliss and Cross retained via disqualification when Royce, who was not the legal competitor, repeatedly sent Bliss into the ring post. Later that night, The IIconics argued backstage. On the May 25 episode, The IIconics apologized for their loss and engaged into a brawl with Bliss and Cross, with the challengers getting the upper hand. On the May 29 episode of SmackDown, Bliss and Cross were interrupted by Bayley and Sasha Banks, with the latter defeating Bliss in a singles match. On the June 1 episode of Raw, Kay defeated Cross. The same week on SmackDown, Banks and Bayley defeated Bliss and Cross to win the WWE Women's Tag Team Championship. On June 8, Banks and Bayley were scheduled to defend the title against The IIconics and Bliss and Cross in a triple threat tag team match at Backlash.

On the April 27 episode of Raw, Apollo Crews's team defeated United States Champion Andrade's team in a six-man tag team match when Crews pinned Andrade. Later that night, Andrade (accompanied by Zelina Vega) defeated Crews to retain the title after Crews tweaked his knee, rendering him unable to continue. This caused Crews to be removed from the men's Money in the Bank ladder match. On the May 18 episode, Kevin Owens and Crews defeated Andrade and Angel Garza in a tag team match. Later that night, Crews challenged Andrade to a title match which took place the following week, where Crews was victorious. On the June 1 episode, a title match between Crews and Owens ended in a no contest when Garza and Andrade interfered. This led to a tag team match where Crews and Owens defeated Garza and Andrade. The following week, Andrade defeated Garza and Owens in a triple threat match to become the number one contender for the U.S. title at Backlash, which was scheduled for the Kickoff pre-show.

On the April 27 episode of Raw, The Viking Raiders (Erik and Ivar) confronted Raw Tag Team Champions The Street Profits (Angelo Dawkins and Montez Ford), stating that they were second-best. The following week, The Viking Raiders defeated The Street Profits in a non-title match. Afterwards, the two teams would begin an "anything you can do, we can do better" tournament. The Street Profits won basketball on the May 11 episode of Raw, The Viking Raiders won axe throwing on the May 18 episode, The Street Profits won golf on the May 25 episode, The Viking Raiders won bowling on the June 1 episode, and on the June 8 episode, both teams tied in a decathlon. On June 14, a title match between the two teams was scheduled for Backlash.

== Event ==
Other on-screen personnel
Role:	Name:
English commentators	Michael Cole (SmackDown)
English commentators	Corey Graves (SmackDown)
English commentators	Tom Phillips (Raw)
English commentators	Samoa Joe (Raw)
English commentators	Byron Saxton (Raw)
English commentators	Kevin Owens (U.S. Title match)
Spanish commentator	Carlos Cabrera
Ring announcers	Greg Hamilton (SmackDown)
Ring announcers	Mike Rome (Raw)
Ring announcers	Howard Finkel (Main Event) (Note: Finkel posthumously announced the main event via archive audio.)
Referees	Danilo Anfibio
Referees	Jessika Carr
Referees	John Cone
Referees	Dan Engler
Referees	Darrick Moore
Referees	Eddie Orengo
Referees	Chad Patton
Referees	Charles Robinson
Interviewers	Charly Caruso
Interviewers	Kayla Braxton
Pre-show panel	Scott Stanford
Pre-show panel	Peter Rosenberg
Pre-show correspondents	Renee Young
Pre-show correspondents	Booker T
Pre-show correspondents	John "Bradshaw" Layfield

=== Pre-show ===
During the Backlash Kickoff pre-show, Apollo Crews defended Raw's United States Championship against Andrade (accompanied by Angel Garza and Zelina Vega). During the match, Kevin Owens, who was the guest commentator, prevented Garza from interfering in the match. In the end, Crews performed a Spin-Out Powerbomb on Andrade to retain the title.

=== Preliminary matches ===
The actual pay-per-view opened with Bayley and Sasha Banks defending the WWE Women's Tag Team Championship in a triple threat tag team match against The IIconics (Billie Kay and Peyton Royce) and Alexa Bliss and Nikki Cross. In the climax, as Bliss performed Twisted Bliss on Royce, Banks, who was outside the ring, re-entered and performed a roll-up on Bliss to retain the titles.

Next, Jeff Hardy faced Sheamus. Sheamus began to target Hardy's knee. Sheamus performed a White Noise on Hardy for a nearfall. Hardy performed a Twist of Fate and Swanton Bomb on Sheamus, who placed his foot on the rope to void the pin. In the closing moments, as Hardy performed a drive-by off the barricade on Sheamus, Sheamus performed a Brogue Kick in mid-air on Hardy. Sheamus then performed a second Brogue Kick on Hardy in the ring to win the match.

After that, Asuka defended the Raw Women's Championship against Nia Jax. In the closing moments, Asuka and Jax applied submission maneuvers and attacked each other while outside the ring. Both were counted out, thus Asuka retained the title.

In the next match, Braun Strowman defended SmackDown's Universal Championship against The Miz and John Morrison in a 2-on-1 handicap match. In the closing moments, Morrison attempted to pin Strowman, but Miz broke up the pin as it would have resulted in Morrison winning the title and not Miz. Miz then started to regret his decision and apologized to Morrison. Strowman then took advantage of the situation and performed a Chokeslam on Miz and a Running Powerslam on Morrison to retain the title.

In what became the penultimate match, Drew McIntyre defended Raw's WWE Championship against Bobby Lashley (accompanied by MVP). Before the match began, MVP distracted McIntyre which allowed Lashley to apply the Full Nelson on McIntyre. After the match officially began, Lashley dominated McIntyre. During numerous pin attempts, McIntyre constantly kicked out at one, which frustrated Lashley. Outside the ring, Lashley threw McIntyre into the ringpost. As Lashley attempted a Spear, McIntyre countered and threw Lashley into the barricade. Lashley performed a Spinebuster on McIntyre, who kicked out at one during a pin attempt, which frustrated Lashley and MVP once more. McIntyre countered a Full Nelson attempt and performed an Alabama Slam on Lashley for a nearfall. As Lashley attempted a Spear on McIntyre, McIntyre countered into a Kimura Lock on Lashley, however, Lashley was able to overcome the submission maneuver. As McIntyre attempted a Claymore Kick, Lashley countered into a Spear for a nearfall. In the end, Lashley's (storyline) wife Lana came out and stood on the ring apron and argued with the referee over the last pin attempt. McIntyre performed a Glasgow Kiss on Lashley, who bumped into Lana, causing her to fall onto MVP at ringside. McIntyre then performed a Claymore Kick on Lashley to retain the title. Following, an irate MVP stared at Lana before departing backstage with Lashley.

Next, The Street Profits (Angelo Dawkins and Montez Ford) were originally set to defend the Raw Tag Team Championship against The Viking Raiders (Erik and Ivar), however, both teams ended up brawling outside in the Performance Center parking lot, where Ford threw Ivar onto Braun Strowman's car. The two teams fought in a walkway where Ivar threw a bowling ball into Ford. Both teams were interrupted by a group of ninja bikers led by Akira Tozawa. The Street Profits and The Viking Raiders then teamed up as "The Viking Profits" and proceeded to fight off the ninjas. After fighting off all the ninjas, Tozawa feigned defeat, however, he summoned a 7-foot tall ninja, who wielded a sword. The Street Profits and Viking Raiders then retreated and fought each other atop a production truck where they threw each other into a dumpster. WWE referee Jessika Carr then appeared and told them that their match was next and stated to Ivar that he was "cute", while Erik was "not so much" (a running gag throughout the rivalry). The segment ended after both teams were spooked by a tentacle creature. The announce team then confirmed that the Raw Tag Team Championship match would not be happening.

=== Main event ===
In the main event, Edge faced Randy Orton in a match WWE billed as "The Greatest Wrestling Match Ever". Referee Charles Robinson laid out the rules of the match, including no hair pulling and no low blows. This was a back-and-forth match. During the match, Orton and Edge used their own finishing moves on each other (RKO and Spear, respectively) and paid homage to other WWE Hall of Famers and legends by using their finishing moves, such as Kurt Angle's Angle Slam (by Orton), Batista's Batista Bomb (by Edge as a surprise counter), Triple H's Pedigree (by Orton, who had twice aligned with Triple H in the past), Eddie Guerrero's Three Amigos (both attempted, with Edge succeeding after stopping Orton's attempt at 2), The Rock's Rock Bottom (by Edge in another surprise counter), and Christian's Killswitch (by Edge, who had grown up and tag-teamed with Christian in real life). In a desperate moment while the referee was not looking, Orton performed a low blow on Edge and then performed a Punt on him to win the match that lasted a little under an hour. Following the match, medical personnel tended to Edge, who refused.

== Aftermath ==
In August 2020, WWE relocated Raw and SmackDown's events to a bio-secure bubble called the WWE ThunderDome, which was first hosted at Orlando's Amway Center. In December, the ThunderDome was relocated to Tropicana Field in St. Petersburg, Florida, and then in April 2021, it was relocated to the Yuengling Center in Tampa, Florida. The 2021 Backlash was in turn WWE's first PPV and livestreaming event held in the ThunderDome at the Yuengling Center. The event was originally scheduled to be held in June, but was moved up to May. This in turn positioned the 2021 event as the first PPV and livestreaming event held after WrestleMania 37, thus the event returned to its original concept and was titled "WrestleMania Backlash". After the 2022 event also carried this name, the 2023 event was truncated back to its original "Backlash" name but maintaining the post-WrestleMania theme. The 2020 event would also be the final Backlash to livestream on the American version of the WWE Network, which merged under Peacock in April 2021.

=== Raw ===
On the following Raw, Randy Orton declared that he was now "the greatest wrestler ever" after winning "The Greatest Wrestling Match Ever". Christian then came out and asked him what kind of friend Orton was. Orton taunted him by stating Christian's desire to have one more match and, since Christian was not medically cleared, challenged him to an unsanctioned match later on the show. Christian was convinced by Big Show and Ric Flair to accept the fight for Edge, who legitimately tore his triceps at Backlash. At the start of the match, Flair, who was in Christian's corner, performed a low blow on Christian and Orton performed a Punt on him to quickly win the match. Following the match, paramedics tended to Christian and stretchered him out of the Performance Center. After recovering from his triceps tear, Edge returned at the 2021 Royal Rumble, where he and Orton entered at number one and two, respectively. The two brawled at ringside, and Edge injured Orton's leg, taking Orton out for the majority of the match. Orton returned in the closing moments of the match where he attempted to eliminate Edge, however, Edge countered and eliminated Orton to win the men's Royal Rumble match. Unsatisfied, Orton challenged Edge to a rubber match on the following night's Raw, where thanks to a distraction by Alexa Bliss (as part of a storyline between Orton, Bliss, and "The Fiend" Bray Wyatt), Edge defeated Orton, putting an end to their rivalry.

Also on Raw, Asuka defended the Raw Women's Championship in a rematch against Nia Jax. During the match, Jax shoved referee John Cone for refusing to count the pin despite Asuka's foot clearly under the bottom rope. As Cone was about to disqualify her, Asuka rolled up Jax and Cone made a fast count for Asuka to retain once again.

After a month of competing in the "anything you can do, we can do better" tournament with both teams at a tiebreaker, Raw Tag Team Champions The Street Profits (Angelo Dawkins and Montez Ford) agreed to defend the titles against The Viking Raiders (Ivar and Erik) the following week, at the behest of Big Show, where The Street Profits retained, after which, Andrade and Angel Garza attacked The Street Profits.

As a result of costing Bobby Lashley his WWE Championship match at Backlash, Lana was blamed by MVP for Lashley's loss. Lashley then said that he wanted a divorce from Lana before leaving.

After The IIconics (Billie Kay and Peyton Royce) won their match, they challenged Bayley and Sasha Banks for the WWE Women's Tag Team Championship. The match was scheduled for the following week, where Banks and Bayley retained. After the match, Banks challenged Asuka for the Raw Women's Championship, which was made official for The Horror Show at Extreme Rules.

=== SmackDown ===
On the following episode of SmackDown, Nikki Cross attacked WWE Women's Tag Team Champions Bayley and Sasha Banks, which led to a match between Cross and Banks that Cross lost. The following week, Cross won a fatal four-way match to earn a SmackDown Women's Championship match against Bayley at The Horror Show at Extreme Rules. On the July 3 episode, Bayley and Banks' tribute to themselves was interrupted by Bliss and Cross. This led to a match between Bayley and Bliss, which ended in a disqualification when Cross and Banks interfered, after which, Bliss and Cross gained the upper hand. The following week, Banks and Bayley defeated Bliss and Cross in a non-title match.

Following more weeks of feuding, Jeff Hardy and Sheamus were scheduled for a bar fight. The match was scheduled for the July 24 episode, where Hardy was victorious to end the feud.

== Results ==
No.	Results	Stipulations	Times
1^{P}	Apollo Crews (c) defeated Andrade (with Angel Garza and Zelina Vega) by pinfall	Singles match for the WWE United States Championship	7:25
2	Bayley and Sasha Banks (c) defeated Alexa Bliss and Nikki Cross and The IIconics (Billie Kay and Peyton Royce) by pinfall	Triple threat tag team match for the WWE Women's Tag Team Championship	8:50
3	Sheamus defeated Jeff Hardy by pinfall	Singles match	16:50
4	Asuka (c) vs. Nia Jax ended in a double countout	Singles match for the WWE Raw Women's Championship	8:25
5	Braun Strowman (c) defeated John Morrison and The Miz by pinfall	1-on-2 Handicap match for the WWE Universal Championship	7:20
6	Drew McIntyre (c) defeated Bobby Lashley (with MVP) by pinfall	Singles match for the WWE Championship	13:15
7	Randy Orton defeated Edge by pinfall	Singles match	44:45
(c) / – the champion(s) heading into the match; P / – the match was broadcast on the pre-show
