= Backlash (2018) =

WWE pay-per-view and livestreaming event

- Promotional poster featuring various WWE wrestlers
- Promotion: WWE
- Brand(s): Raw; SmackDown
- Date: May 6, 2018
- City: Newark, New Jersey
- Venue: Prudential Center
- Attendance: 14,724
- Tagline: Raw and SmackDown Together For The Price of One

WWE event chronology
← Previous; Greatest Royal Rumble	Next → NXT TakeOver: Chicago II

Backlash chronology
← Previous; 2017	Next → 2020

The 2018 Backlash was a professional wrestling pay-per-view (PPV) and livestreaming event produced by WWE, held for wrestlers from the promotion's main roster brands, Raw and SmackDown. It was the 14th Backlash and took place on May 6, 2018, at the Prudential Center in Newark, New Jersey.

Nine matches were contested at the event, including one on the Kickoff pre-show. Due to the Superstar Shake-up (draft) that occurred in mid-April, several matches were interpromotional matches as they were scheduled before the shake-up occurred. In the main event, Raw's Roman Reigns defeated SmackDown's Samoa Joe. Also on the card, SmackDown's WWE Championship match between defending champion AJ Styles and Shinsuke Nakamura ended in a draw, and in the opening bout, Seth Rollins retained Raw's Intercontinental Championship against SmackDown's The Miz. The show was also notable for Daniel Bryan's first singles match on a PPV and livestreaming event since Fastlane in February 2015.

The event was originally planned to be held exclusively for the Raw brand, after the 2017 event was SmackDown-exclusive, but after April's WrestleMania 34, brand-exclusive PPV and livestreaming events for the main roster under the second brand split were discontinued. This made it the first Backlash since 2009 to feature multiple brands during a brand split. An originally planned 2019 event was replaced by Stomping Grounds, but Backlash was reinstated in 2020.

The event garnered negative reviews from critics, with the finish to the WWE Championship match and main event being particularly criticised, the latter for both its card placement and fan reaction towards the match itself. Other criticisms were levied against the rest of the card being middle of the road, as well as the Nia Jax promo after the Raw Women's Championship match. However, the Intercontinental Championship opening bout received praise, and was singled out as the best match of the night by most critics.

== Production ==
=== Background ===
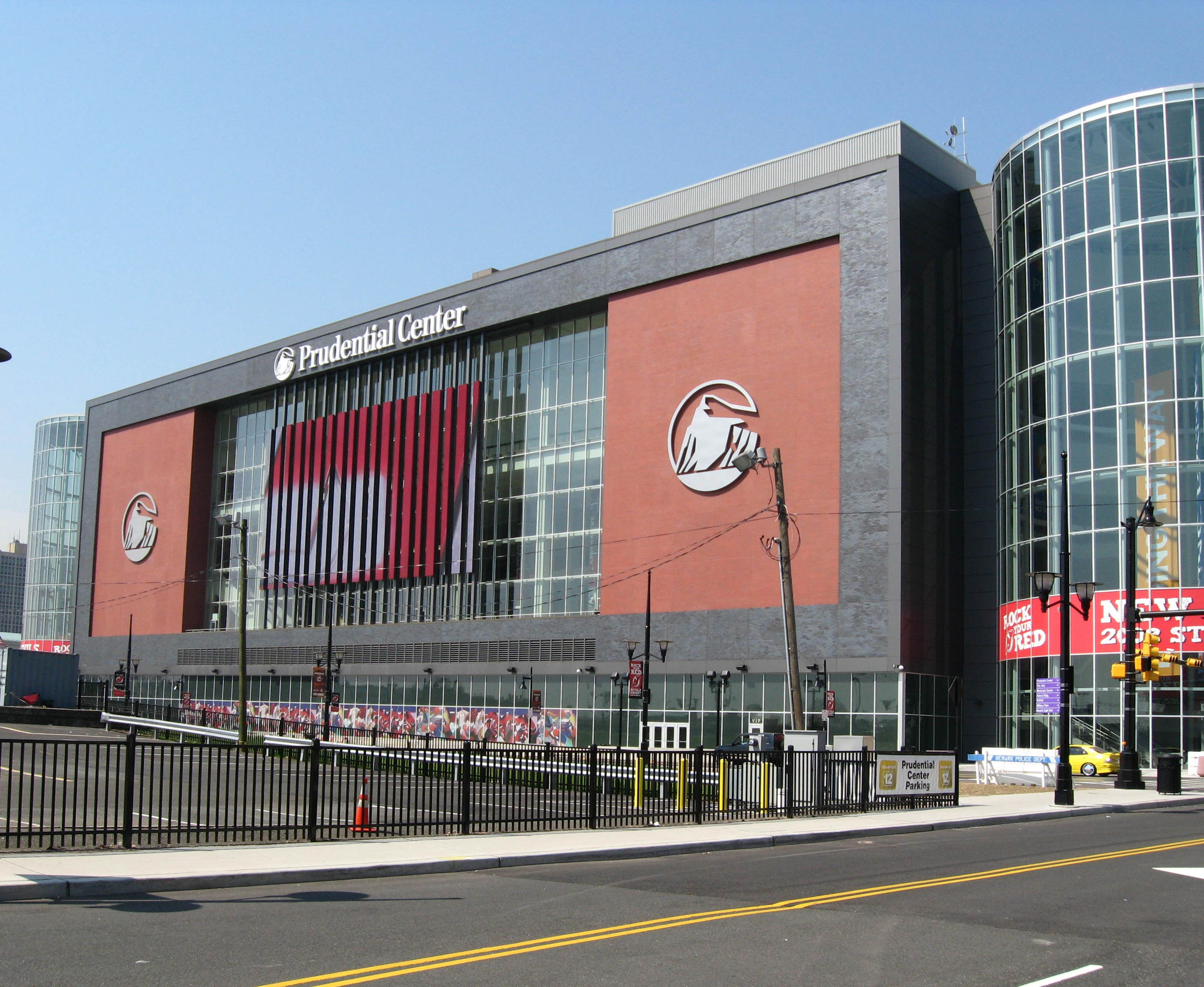
The 14th Backlash was held at the Prudential Center in Newark, New Jersey.

Backlash is a professional wrestling event that was established by WWE in 1999. It was held annually from 1999 to 2009, but was then discontinued until it was reinstated in 2016. The event was originally broadcast exclusively via pay-per-view (PPV) before it began simultaneously livestreaming on the WWE Network in 2016. The original concept of the event was based around the backlash from WWE's flagship event, WrestleMania, but this theme was dropped with its revival in 2016. As first reported on November 22, 2017, and later confirmed on December 19, 14th Backlash was scheduled to be held on May 6, 2018, at the Prudential Center in Newark, New Jersey. Tickets went on sale on February 24 via Ticketmaster.

After the reintroduction of the brand extension in mid-2016, the events in 2016 and 2017 featured wrestlers exclusively from the SmackDown brand. The 2018 event was originally planned to be Raw-exclusive, but in February, WWE announced that following WrestleMania 34 in April, brand-exclusive PPV and livestreaming events for the main roster would be discontinued, thus the 2018 Backlash featured wrestlers from both Raw and SmackDown. This in turn was the first Backlash since 2009 to feature multiple brands during a brand split.

=== Storylines ===
The event comprised nine matches, including one on the Kickoff pre-show, that resulted from scripted storylines. Results were predetermined by WWE's writers on the Raw and SmackDown brands, while storylines were produced on WWE's weekly television shows, Monday Night Raw and SmackDown Live.

At WrestleMania 34, Brock Lesnar retained the Universal Championship against Roman Reigns and then was scheduled to defend the title against Reigns in a Steel Cage match at the Greatest Royal Rumble, which Reigns lost. On the April 9 episode of Raw, Reigns addressed his match against Lesnar when a returning Samoa Joe, who had been out with injury since January, interrupted him, called him a failure, and challenged him to a match at Backlash. During the Superstar Shake-up, Joe was traded to SmackDown.

At WrestleMania 34, AJ Styles retained the WWE Championship against Shinsuke Nakamura. After the match, Nakamura turned heel by attacking Styles with a low-blow. Repeated attacks by Nakamura led to a rematch at the Greatest Royal Rumble on April 27, which ended in a double countout. Subsequently, Styles was scheduled to defend his title against Nakamura at Backlash in a no disqualification match.

At WrestleMania 34, Seth Rollins defeated The Miz and Finn Bálor in a triple threat match to capture the Intercontinental Championship. The following night on Raw, The Miz invoked his championship rematch clause for Backlash. During the Superstar Shake-up, Miz was traded to SmackDown. Prior to Backlash, Rollins retained the title against Miz, Bálor, and Samoa Joe, who was also traded to SmackDown, at the Greatest Royal Rumble in a fatal four-way ladder match, making Rollins the defending champion at Backlash.

At WrestleMania 34, Jinder Mahal defeated Randy Orton, Bobby Roode, and Rusev in a fatal four-way match to win the United States Championship. On the following episode of SmackDown, Orton defeated Roode and Rusev in a triple threat match to face Mahal for the title at Backlash. However, on the April 16 episode of Raw, Mahal was traded to Raw during the Superstar Shake-up and lost the title to Jeff Hardy, and Mahal invoked his rematch clause at the Greatest Royal Rumble. Hardy was then traded to SmackDown the next night, where as Orton was about to face Shelton Benjamin, Hardy interrupted his entrance and took the match instead. The following week, Hardy was set to face Benjamin, but Orton this time interrupted Hardy and took the match. Hardy retained his championship at the Greatest Royal Rumble against Mahal, making Hardy the defending champion against Orton at Backlash. On the May 1 episode of SmackDown, Orton and Hardy teamed up and defeated Miz and Benjamin, after which, Orton attacked Hardy with an RKO.

At WrestleMania 34, Nia Jax defeated Alexa Bliss to win the Raw Women's Championship. A rematch for the championship was later scheduled for Backlash.

On the April 10 episode of SmackDown, Charlotte Flair, who had just retained the SmackDown Women's Championship against Asuka at WrestleMania 34, was attacked by The IIconics (Billie Kay and Peyton Royce). Carmella took advantage of the opportunity and cashed in her Money in the Bank contract and won the championship. A rematch was later scheduled for Backlash.

On the April 17 episode of SmackDown, Big Cass returned from injury, aiding Shinsuke Nakamura in attacking AJ Styles and Daniel Bryan during a match in which the two were teaming together. The following week, a "Miz TV" segment with Daniel Bryan was advertised, but instead Cass came out (it was later revealed that Cass had attacked him backstage). SmackDown General Manager Paige scheduled a match between the two for Backlash. At Greatest Royal Rumble, Cass eliminated Bryan from the Greatest Royal Rumble match.

On the April 9 episode of Raw, Bobby Lashley returned to WWE after a 10-year absence. Also that night, Kevin Owens and Sami Zayn appeared backstage on Raw and tried to convince Raw General Manager Kurt Angle to hire them since they were unsuccessful in gaining back their jobs on SmackDown at WrestleMania 34. Angle decided that the winner of a match between the two would get a contract, but the match ended in a double countout, so neither received a contract. On the April 16 episode, however, Raw Commissioner Stephanie McMahon awarded both Owens and Zayn contracts. The two were later involved in a 10-man tag team match, and were defeated by the opposing team, which included Lashley and Braun Strowman. On the April 30 episode, Roman Reigns, Lashley, and Strowman defeated Jinder Mahal, Owens, and Zayn in a six-man tag team match. During the match, Strowman continuously sent Owens and Zayn crashing into the barricade walls. Later in the night, a match pitting Lashley and Strowman against Owens and Zayn was made for Backlash.

On the April 16 episode of Raw, a match between Bayley and Sasha Banks ended in a no contest when The Riott Squad (Ruby Riott, Liv Morgan, and Sarah Logan) interfered, being transferred to Raw during the Superstar Shake-up. On May 4, after more weeks of feuding, a match between Bayley and Riott was scheduled for the Kickoff pre-show.

== Event ==
Other on-screen personnel
Role:	Name:
English commentators	Michael Cole (Raw)
English commentators	Corey Graves (Raw/SmackDown)
English commentators	Jonathan Coachman (Raw)
English commentators	Tom Phillips (SmackDown)
English commentators	Byron Saxton (SmackDown)
Spanish commentators	Carlos Cabrera
Spanish commentators	Marcelo Rodríguez
German commentators	Carsten Schaefer
German commentators	Tim Haber
German commentators	Calvin Knie
Ring announcers	Greg Hamilton (SmackDown)
Ring announcers	JoJo (Raw)
Referees	Danilo Anfibio
Referees	Jason Ayers
Referees	John Cone
Referees	Darrick Moore
Referees	Chad Patton
Referees	Ryan Tran
Referees	Rod Zapata
Interviewers	Renee Young
Interviewers	Charly Caruso
Interviewers	Dasha Fuentes
Pre-show panel	Renee Young
Pre-show panel	Booker T
Pre-show panel	Peter Rosenberg
Pre-show panel	David Otunga
Post-show panel	Renee Young
Post-show panel	Peter Rosenberg

=== Pre-show ===
During the Backlash Kickoff pre-show, Bayley took on Ruby Riott. After a distraction by The Riott Squad (Liv Morgan and Sarah Logan), Riott performed the Riott Kick on Bayley for the win.

=== Preliminary matches ===
The actual pay-per-view opened with Seth Rollins defending Raw's Intercontinental Championship against SmackDown's The Miz. During the match, Miz targeted Rollins' leg, applying the figure-four leglock multiple times. On two different occasions, Miz performed Skull-Crushing Finale on Rollins, but both resulted in nearfalls. In the end, Rollins performed a Curb Stomp on Miz to retain the title.

Next, Nia Jax defended the Raw Women's Championship against Alexa Bliss. In the end, Jax performed a Samoan drop on Bliss to retain the title. After the match, Jax cut a promo about bullying and stated that everyone is a star and one should not worry about their appearance.

After that, Jeff Hardy defended SmackDown's United States Championship against Randy Orton. After Orton missed an RKO, Hardy delivered a Twist of Fate followed by a Swanton Bomb to retain the championship.

Next, Elias tried to perform a song, but was repeatedly interrupted by The New Day (Big E, Kofi Kingston and Xavier Woods), Rusev, Aiden English, and No Way Jose's Conga line (which included Titus O'Neil, Apollo Crews, Dana Brooke, Tyler Breeze, and Fandango). Bobby Roode then attacked Elias with a Glorious DDT.

In the fourth match, Daniel Bryan faced Big Cass. In the end, Bryan forced Cass to submit to the Yes Lock to win the match. After the match, Cass attacked Bryan with a big boot.

After that, Carmella defended the SmackDown Women's Championship against Charlotte Flair. Charlotte performed a spear on Carmella, who countered a Figure Four Leglock attempt into the Code of Silence. Charlotte got to her feet to escape the hold, but Carmella rolled her up for a nearfall. Charlotte then performed a Big Boot for a nearfall. In the end, Charlotte attempted a moonsault, but missed and buckled her left knee. Carmella then kicked Charlotte's knee and pinned her to retain the title.

In the next match, AJ Styles defended SmackDown's WWE Championship against Shinsuke Nakamura in a No Disqualification match. As Nakamura went for the Kinshasa, Styles attacked Nakamura's knee with a chair. Nakamura delivered a low blow on Styles, only for Styles to attack Nakamura with a low blow. Nakamura and Styles attacked each other with a low blow simultaneously; both could not answer the referee's count of ten, thus the match ended as a draw, which resulted in Styles retaining the championship.

In the penultimate match, Bobby Lashley and Braun Strowman took on Kevin Owens and Sami Zayn. In the end, Lashley delivered a stalling suplex to Owens for the win. After the match, Strowman performed a running powerslam on both Owens and Zayn.

=== Main event ===
In the main event, Raw's Roman Reigns fought SmackDown's Samoa Joe. Before the match began, Joe attacked Reigns and put him through a broadcast table with a uranage. Reigns performed a superman punch on Joe for a near-fall. Reigns performed a Spear on Joe, who placed his foot on the bottom rope to void the pin. Joe applied the Coquina Clutch on Reigns, who got to the rope to escape. In the end, Reigns pinned Joe after another Spear to win the match.

== Reception ==
The event received largely negative reviews. Dave Meltzer, for the Wrestling Observer Newsletter, wrote that "aside from Rollins vs. Miz, this has been a really bad show". The show was so poor that "one of [WWE's] hottest crowds of the year" "didn't even react to Strowman's big move" near the end of the event. For the Joe-Reigns main event, Meltzer wrote that it was definitely not a good match, it "started off boring and the crowd hated it, chanting boring, chanting for [CM] Punk, lots of people were leaving". The tag team match was "a mess", and the finish of the Nakamura-Styles world title match was so bad that it turned a "very good" match into a "disappointing" match overall. For the women's matches, Meltzer described Bayley-Riott as sloppy but noted that the crowd were behind Bayley, this was in contrast to the crowd being less interested for Bliss-Jax, which was followed by a "contrived" anti-bullying segment by Jax and Michael Cole. Meanwhile, Charlotte-Carmella was "hard to watch because it had to be athletically dumbed down" for Carmella.

Brian Campbell and Adam Silverstein of CBS Sports wrote that many results on the show left fans "annoyed" and dissatisfied, especially since Joe-Reigns and Nakamura-Styles "disappointed from a storytelling perspective". They described that it was "impossible to ignore how poorly WWE continues to treat its own fanbase" as WWE went "back to the well in booking the despised Reigns as a heroic babyface able to overcome all odds", resulting in a D+ graded "main event that was largely ignored by the Newark crowd, producing chants of 'CM Punk', 'Rusev Day' and 'beat the traffic' as fans exited the arena before the finish." The writers felt that Styles and Nakamura "certainly deserved better" as it for "the second straight week, WWE presented a PPV in which the WWE championship wasn't contested in the main event. Even worse, both times it ended without a clean finish", so "the ending fell flat in what had been a strong match" for a B+ graded world title match. As for the theme of low blows in the Styles-Nakamura feud, it "came across as either comedic or disrespectful for the skills and standing of both." Additionally, the "brief and rather pedestrian match" between Daniel Bryan and Big Cass was rated C+, but Big Cass' post-match attack made it "hard to disregard just how angry he makes the crowd as a pure heel".

Bob Kapur for Canoe.com's SLAM! Wrestling wrote that "the only Backlash should be the criticism that the company gets" for this "pretty lousy show", "full of dull matches with finishes that ranged from uninspired to dumb to just plain terrible". The "terrible finish" was referencing that of the Styles-Nakamura match which "felt like a big kick to the nads of everyone watching". The main event was "pretty boring", as was the "Randy Orton bore-a-thon" United States title match. The only positives were the "fantastic" Intercontinental title match which had "cool sequences" and Elias' segment which was "very entertaining".

Aaron Oster of The Baltimore Sun described Backlash as "lackluster", saying all but two matches (Miz-Rollins and Nakamura-Styles) were bad and "nothing of importance really happened in the show — no title changes, no meaningful story moments ... the show couldn't have been much less important". But even for Nakamura-Styles, Oster wrote that repeating the draw finish from the Greatest Royal Rumble nine days prior was letting "the storyline to advance another week without anything happening".

Nick Schwartz of USA Today described WWE fans as being "stunned" and "fuming" at WWE's decision to let Roman Reigns' match be the Backlash main event over the WWE Championship match. Aaron Oster of The Baltimore Sun also agreed on this point. One fan interpreted that the arrangement showed that Reigns is more important than the world title, while another ridiculed how Reigns "has spent months complaining that someone else is the company favourite and there's a conspiracy against him" but yet "is closing a PPV in a non-title match with nothing on the line".

Dave Meltzer gave the first, eighth, and last matches of the event 1.5 stars each. The Intercontinental Championship match received 4.25 stars (the highest rated match of the event), the Raw Women's Championship match received 1.25 stars, the SmackDown Women's Championship match received 1 star (the lowest rated match of the event), the United States Championship match received 2.25 stars, the Daniel Bryan vs. Big Cass match received 2 stars, and the WWE Championship match received 3.25 stars.

== Aftermath ==
A Backlash event was originally scheduled to be held in June 2019, but the event was canceled and replaced by Stomping Grounds. In 2020, however, Backlash was reinstated.

=== Raw ===
After Backlash, focus shifted on the next PPV event, Money in the Bank. On the following Raw, Kurt Angle scheduled multiple Money in the Bank qualifying matches for that subsequent episode, only to be interrupted by Kevin Owens and Braun Strowman, who both wanted to take part in the men's ladder match. Angle scheduled a match between Strowman and Owens, which Strowman won. Later that night, Finn Bálor defeated Roman Reigns and Sami Zayn to qualify for that ladder match after interference from Jinder Mahal. The following week, more Money in the Bank qualifying matches took place. Reigns attacked Mahal, removing him from the second triple threat qualifying match for the men. Owens took Mahal's place and defeated Bobby Lashley and Elias, also in a triple threat match, to qualify for the match.

Also on the following Raw, Intercontinental Champion Seth Rollins addressed the fans about his reign and issued an open challenge for the title, which was accepted by Mojo Rawley, who Rollins defeated to retain the title.

Bobby Lashley was interviewed about his family, including his three sisters. The following week, Sami Zayn said that Lashley was not a nice guy and promised to bring out Lashley's sisters to tell the truth. On the May 21 episode, three men dressed up as Lashley's sisters accused Lashley of violence. Lashley interrupted the segment and attacked the impostors along with Zayn. The following week, a match between Lashley and Zayn was scheduled for Money in the Bank.

After being attacked by Bobby Roode during his concert at Backlash, Elias took on Roode on the following Raw in a losing effort.

For the women's Money in the Bank ladder match, Ember Moon and Alexa Bliss won their respective triple threat matches to qualify for the match. Bayley, Ruby Riott, and Sasha Banks were involved in them, as well. On the May 28 episode, Bayley, Riott, and Banks took part in a gauntlet match for the final spot in the match, which was won by Banks.

At Money in the Bank, Alexa Bliss won the women's Money in the Bank ladder match and later that night, she cashed in her contract on Nia Jax to win back the Raw Women's Championship. They had another title match at Extreme Rules as an Extreme Rules match, where Bliss retained.

=== SmackDown ===
Money in the Bank qualifying matches continued on the following SmackDown. The Miz and Rusev won their respective matches to qualify for the men's match, and Charlotte Flair won her match to qualify for the women's.

Due to the controversial finish to their match at Backlash, another match between AJ Styles and Shinsuke Nakamura for the WWE Championship was scheduled for Money in the Bank. On the May 15 episode of SmackDown, Nakamura defeated Styles in a non-title match to pick the stipulation for the match, and chose a Last Man Standing match.

Randy Orton returned at Extreme Rules, where he attacked Jeff Hardy after the latter lost the United States Championship. Orton attacked Hardy again on the following episode of SmackDown and at SummerSlam. This led to a Hell in a Cell match between the two at Hell in a Cell, which Orton won to end the rivalry.

Daniel Bryan and Big Cass also continued their rivalry. Bryan attacked Cass on the May 15 episode of SmackDown and at a house show in Germany, where he injured Cass' leg. As a result, Bryan cost Cass a spot in a Money in the Bank qualifying match, and on the May 22 episode, Bryan won his match to qualify for the men's ladder match. On the May 29 episode, Cass returned and he and Bryan lost a triple threat Money in the Bank qualifying match to Samoa Joe. Afterwards, Cass attacked Bryan, setting up another match between the two for Money in the Bank.

== Results ==
No.	Results	Stipulations	Times
1^{P}	Ruby Riott (with Liv Morgan and Sarah Logan) defeated Bayley by pinfall	Singles match	10:10
2	Seth Rollins (c) defeated The Miz by pinfall	Singles match for the WWE Intercontinental Championship	20:30
3	Nia Jax (c) defeated Alexa Bliss by pinfall	Singles match for the WWE Raw Women's Championship	10:20
4	Jeff Hardy (c) defeated Randy Orton by pinfall	Singles match for the WWE United States Championship	12:00
5	Daniel Bryan defeated Big Cass by submission	Singles match	7:45
6	Carmella (c) defeated Charlotte Flair by pinfall	Singles match for the WWE SmackDown Women's Championship	9:00
7	AJ Styles (c) vs. Shinsuke Nakamura ended in a draw	No Disqualification match for the WWE Championship	21:05
8	Bobby Lashley and Braun Strowman defeated Kevin Owens and Sami Zayn by pinfall	Tag team match	8:40
9	Roman Reigns defeated Samoa Joe by pinfall	Singles match	18:10
(c) / – the champion(s) heading into the match; P / – the match was broadcast on the pre-show
