= WrestleMania 34 =

2018 WWE pay-per-view and livestreaming event

- Promotional poster featuring various WWE wrestlers
- Promotion: WWE
- Brand(s): Raw; SmackDown; 205 Live
- Date: April 8, 2018
- City: New Orleans, Louisiana
- Venue: Mercedes-Benz Superdome
- Attendance: 60,000–65,000

WWE event chronology
← Previous; NXT TakeOver: New Orleans	Next → Greatest Royal Rumble

WrestleMania chronology
← Previous; 33	Next → 35

WrestleMania 34 was a 2018 professional wrestling pay-per-view (PPV) and livestreaming event produced by WWE, held for wrestlers from the promotion's main roster brands, Raw, SmackDown, and 205 Live. It was the 34th annual WrestleMania and took place on April 8, 2018, at the Mercedes-Benz Superdome in New Orleans, Louisiana. This was the second WrestleMania held at this venue, after WrestleMania XXX in 2014, and the first to include the cruiserweight-exclusive 205 Live brand, albeit on the Kickoff pre-show, subsequently being the first to feature wrestlers from three brands since WrestleMania 25 in 2009.

The card comprised 14 matches, including three on the Kickoff pre-show. In the main event, which was the main match of the Raw brand, Brock Lesnar retained the Universal Championship against Roman Reigns. The main match from SmackDown saw AJ Styles retain the WWE Championship against Shinsuke Nakamura. Other matches saw Ronda Rousey make her WWE debut and Daniel Bryan returned to the ring after nearly three years of absence due to concussions. In a featured match from Raw, Rousey teamed with Kurt Angle to defeat Triple H and Stephanie McMahon in a mixed tag team match, while in a featured match from SmackDown, Bryan teamed with Shane McMahon to defeat Kevin Owens and Sami Zayn. Also, The Undertaker defeated John Cena in an impromptu match.

Also on the card, Charlotte Flair retained the SmackDown Women's Championship against Asuka, ending Asuka's undefeated streak. A 10-year-old named Nicholas (son of referee John Cone) became the youngest champion in WWE history when he teamed with Braun Strowman to defeat Cesaro and Sheamus to win the Raw Tag Team Championship. This was also the first time that the SmackDown Tag Team Championship was defended at a WrestleMania.

WrestleMania 34 received mixed-to-positive reviews from fans and critics, with the world title matches being subjected to more negative responses. The main event between Lesnar and Reigns particularly received heavy criticism and was decried by some as one of the worst main events in WrestleMania history. Despite this, other aspects of the show, such as the return of Daniel Bryan, SmackDown's Intercontinental Championship match, the SmackDown Women's Championship match, and the debut performance of Ronda Rousey, were widely praised.

== Production ==
=== Background ===
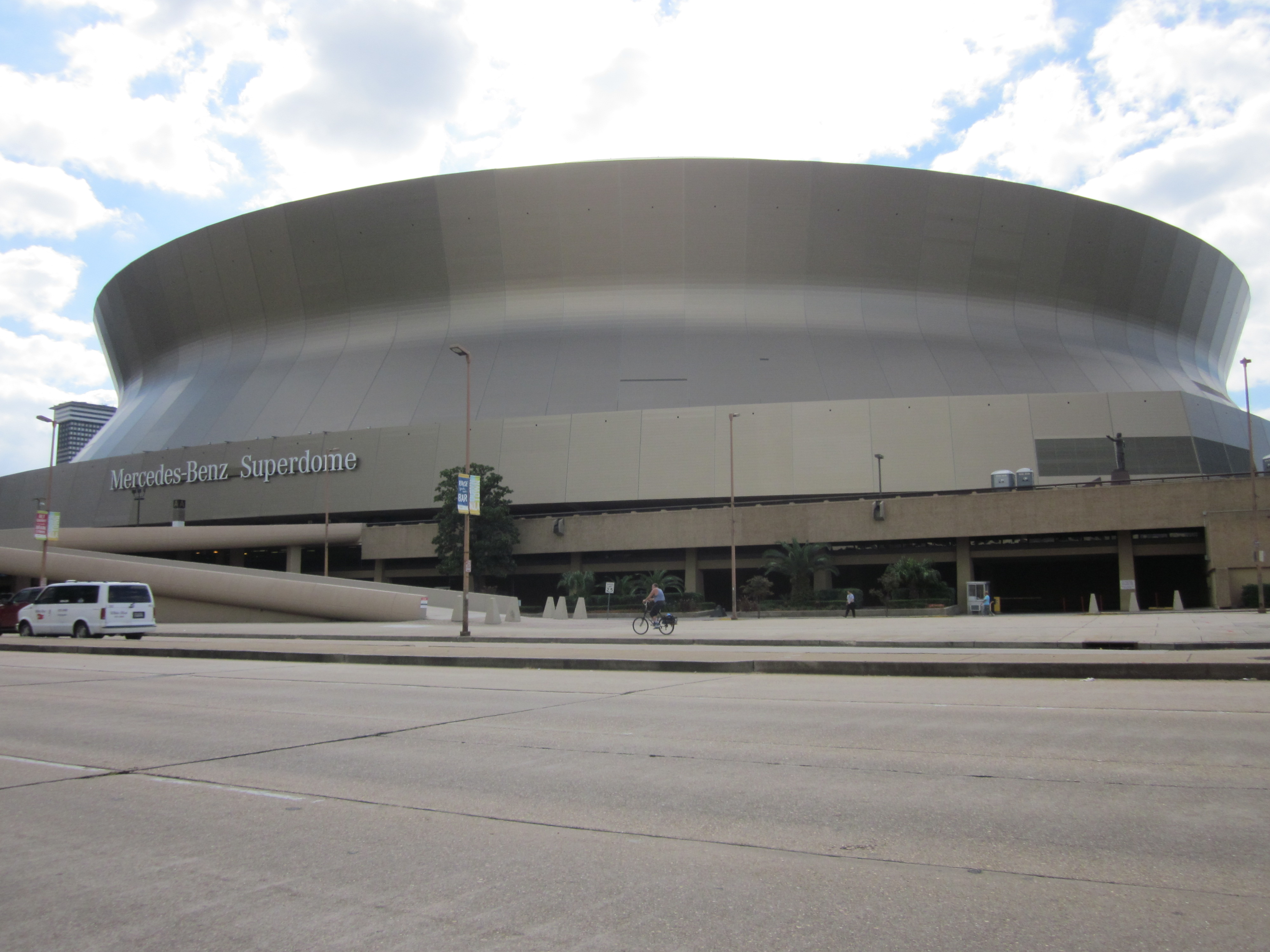
The 34th annual WrestleMania was the second time for WWE's marquee event to held at the Mercedes-Benz Superdome in New Orleans, Louisiana, after WrestleMania XXX in 2014.

WrestleMania is WWE's flagship professional wrestling pay-per-view (PPV) and livestreaming event, having first been held in 1985. It was the company's first pay-per-view produced and was also WWE's first major event available via livestreaming when the company launched the WWE Network in 2014. It is the longest-running professional wrestling event in history and is held annually between mid-March to mid-April. It was the first of WWE's original four pay-per-views, which includes Royal Rumble, SummerSlam, and Survivor Series, referred to as the "Big Four". WrestleMania was ranked the sixth most valuable sports brand in the world by Forbes in 2017, and has been described as the Super Bowl of sports entertainment. Much like the Super Bowl, cities bid for the right to host the year's edition of WrestleMania.

Announced on January 9, 2017, WrestleMania 34 was scheduled to be held on April 8, 2018, at the Mercedes-Benz Superdome in New Orleans, Louisiana and it wrestlers from the Raw, SmackDown, and 205 Live brand divisions. The event was the second WrestleMania to be held in the U.S. state of Louisiana, subsequently the second held at the Mercedes-Benz Superdome, which previously hosted WrestleMania XXX in 2014. On October 30, 2017, traveling packages for the event were sold; tickets went on sale on November 17, 2017, with individual tickets costing from $35 to $2,000.

The four official theme songs for the event were "Celebrate" and "New Orleans" by Kid Rock, "Let the Good Times Roll" by Freddie King, and Devil by Shinedown. On April 8, prior to the start of WrestleMania, WWE and event sponsor Snickers held the WrestleMania Block Party at the Champions Square plaza. The tailgate event included appearances from WWE Hall of Famers Alundra Blayze and Ric Flair, as well from active competitors Tamina and R-Truth. American duo Chloe x Halle performed "America the Beautiful" to kick off the main card of WrestleMania.

Since 2014, WWE attempted to establish Roman Reigns as their top babyface and the next "face of the company", but a significant portion of fans rejected Reigns in this role, taking issue with his perceived special treatment, real-life demeanor, wrestling moveset, speaking skills, and character presentation. This resulted in Reigns being booed while he wrestled in the main events of WrestleMania 31, WrestleMania 32, and WrestleMania 33. The perception that Reigns was the "company's chosen one" led to widespread expectations that Reigns would triumph in the main event of WrestleMania 34 to become WWE Universal Champion; and it was also anticipated that while doing so, he would be again received negatively by the WrestleMania crowd.

=== Storylines ===
The event comprised 14 matches, including three on the Kickoff pre-show, that resulted from scripted storylines, where wrestlers portrayed heroes, villains, or less distinguishable characters in scripted events that built tension and culminated in a wrestling match or series of matches. Results were predetermined by WWE's writers on the Raw, SmackDown, and 205 Live brands, while storylines were produced on WWE's weekly television shows, Monday Night Raw, SmackDown Live, and the cruiserweight-exclusive 205 Live.

==== World championship matches ====
After Brock Lesnar won the Universal Championship at WrestleMania 33, he seldom defended the title, which was often criticized, especially by Roman Reigns. As the 2018 men's Royal Rumble winner chose SmackDown's world championship, Lesnar's WrestleMania 34 opponent was determined through the Elimination Chamber match at the namesake event, which was won by Reigns. The two had also previously fought at WrestleMania 31 in March 2015 over Lesnar's WWE World Heavyweight Championship (truncated as WWE Championship in 2016), but without a decisive winner as Seth Rollins cashed in his Money in the Bank contract and pinned Reigns to win. Despite being advertised, Lesnar did not appear for several episodes of Raw. Reigns repeatedly criticized Lesnar and also questioned WWE Chairman and Chied Executive Officer Vince McMahon, for which he was temporarily suspended. When Reigns nevertheless appeared on Raw to confront Lesnar, he was arrested by U.S. Marshals. The handcuffed Reigns assaulted the Marshals, but was then attacked by Lesnar. Heyman then declared that should Lesnar lose, they would not re-sign with WWE. Their match was scheduled as the main event, which would be the first Universal Championship match to main event WrestleMania.

At the Royal Rumble, SmackDown's Shinsuke Nakamura won the men's Royal Rumble match, earning a world championship match of his choosing at WrestleMania 34. Nakamura immediately chose SmackDown's WWE Champion AJ Styles. At Fastlane, Styles retained the WWE Championship in a six-pack challenge, thus solidifying the Styles-Nakamura match at WrestleMania. The two expressed respect for each other, but Styles warned Nakamura to not take him lightly this time, bringing up their previous encounter in New Japan Pro-Wrestling in January 2016, where Nakamura had defeated Styles.

==== Undercard matches ====
After failing to win the Elimination Chamber match, Intercontinental Champion The Miz demanded a WrestleMania challenger on the February 26 episode of Raw. Seth Rollins then came out and defeated Miz, followed by Finn Bálor, who also defeated him. The following week, both Rollins and Bálor confronted Miz, leading to a 2-on-3 handicap match between Rollins and Bálor and The Miz and his Miztourage (Bo Dallas and Curtis Axel), in which Rollins pinned Miz. Afterwards, Raw General Manager Kurt Angle scheduled The Miz to defend his championship against Bálor and Rollins in a triple threat match at WrestleMania.

At the Royal Rumble, Raw's Asuka won the women's Royal Rumble match. As a result, Asuka earned the right to challenge for a women's championship of her choosing at WrestleMania. On the advice of Raw Commissioner Stephanie McMahon, Asuka postponed her decision until both women's champions had defended their titles at Elimination Chamber and Fastlane, respectively. Following Charlotte Flair's successful defense at Fastlane, Asuka appeared and challenged her for the SmackDown Women's Championship at WrestleMania. Asuka explained that she chose Flair as she wanted to challenge the best women's champion in WWE, while Flair vowed to end Asuka's undefeated streak. (Note: WWE had promoted Asuka as undefeated since her NXT debut in October 2015. Although Asuka had never lost a match by submitting or being pinned, up to May 2016 she had come up short in a battle royal on NXT television and two non-televised multi-person matches, when other wrestlers were pinned. See Asuka (wrestler)#NXT Women's Champion (2015–2017) for details.)

After Alexa Bliss won her second Raw Women's Championship in August 2017, she formed a friendship with Nia Jax, who also had championship aspirations. Jax failed to earn a title shot at the Royal Rumble and also lost to Asuka at Elimination Chamber in a match that would have added her to Asuka's WrestleMania championship match. After Asuka defeated her in a rematch on Raw, Bliss consoled Jax and said she deserved a title match. When Asuka explained her reasons for challenging Charlotte Flair, Bliss and Mickie James confronted her and called out Jax to wrestle Asuka, but Jax did not appear. Later during Jax's match, Bliss and James, who were unaware of the live microphone, were heard disparaging Jax, who was upset by this. The following week, Bliss issued a fake apology and continued to insult Jax, who chased off the champion. When Bliss complained to Raw General Manager Kurt Angle, he scheduled her to defend the Raw Women's Championship against Jax at WrestleMania.

After defeating The Revival (Dash Wilder and Scott Dawson), Raw Tag Team Champions Cesaro and Sheamus said they had defeated every tag team on Raw and issued an open challenge to any tag team to face them at WrestleMania. On March 12, General Manager Kurt Angle scheduled a tag team battle royal with the winning team receiving a championship match at WrestleMania. Braun Strowman interjected himself into the match without a partner and won. The following week, Angle decided that Strowman would receive a Raw Tag Team Championship match at WrestleMania as long as he found a partner. Strowman said that he did not need a partner, but would have one. He defeated both Cesaro and Sheamus in singles matches, but did not reveal his partner prior to the event.

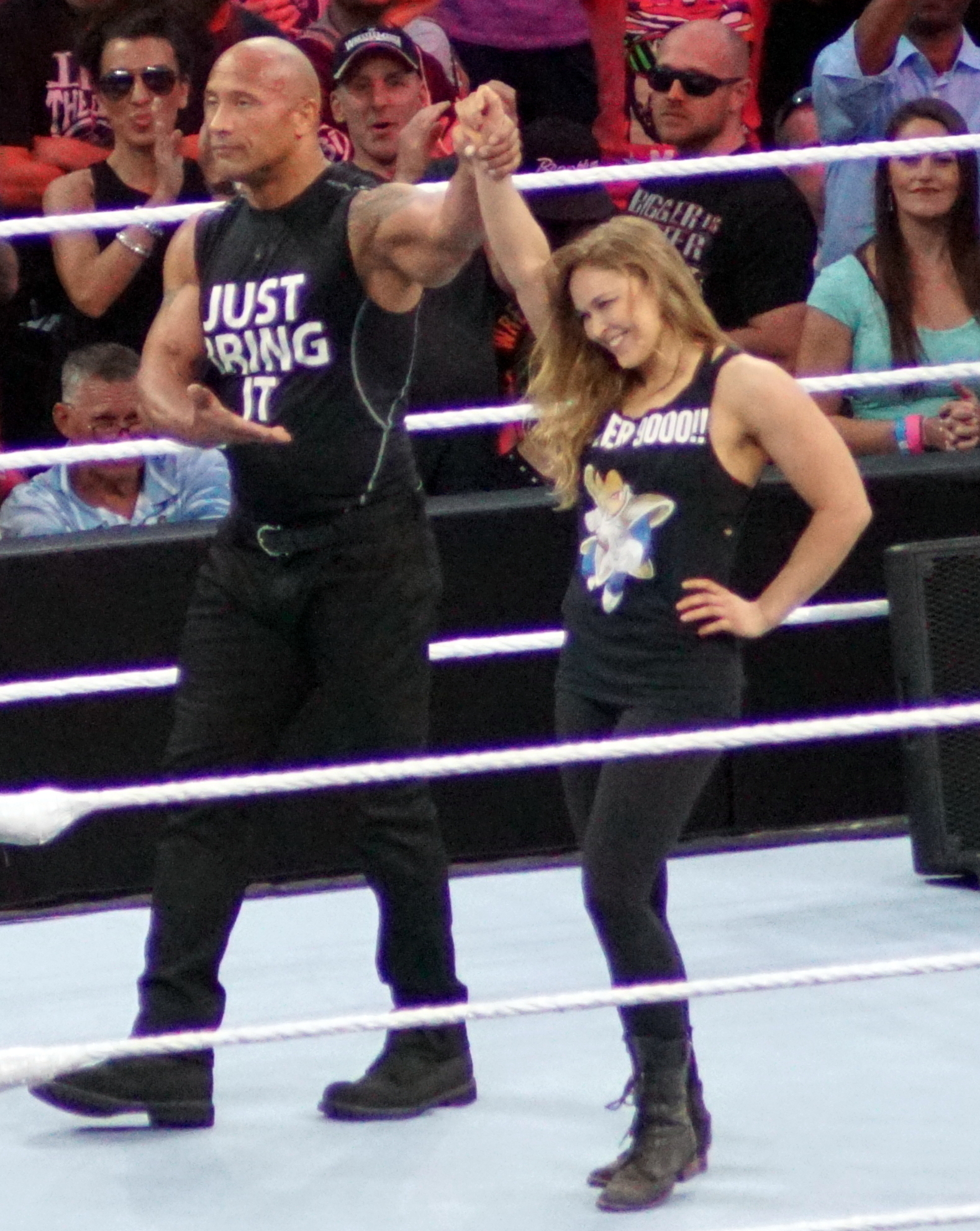
The Rock and Ronda Rousey after embarrassing Triple H and Stephanie McMahon at WrestleMania 31, the genesis of their feud; Kurt Angle, whose involvement was set up at Survivor Series in November 2017, replaced The Rock in the feud as Rock was unable to commit due to his acting schedule.

At WrestleMania 31 in March 2015, then-Ultimate Fighting Championship (UFC) mixed martial artist Ronda Rousey appeared alongside The Rock and embarrassed The Authority (Triple H and his wife, Stephanie McMahon). She made some appearances over the next couple of years and was rumored to compete in the 2018 women's Royal Rumble match, however, Rousey denied that she would be at the event. Rousey eventually appeared at the end of the event, confirming that she had signed full-time with WWE. During the official contract signing at Elimination Chamber, her debut match was confirmed for WrestleMania 34. Raw General Manager Kurt Angle, whom Stephanie (now Raw Commissioner) previously had threatened to fire and whom Triple H had turned on at Survivor Series, then brought up the incident from WrestleMania 31 and warned Rousey that Triple H and Stephanie wanted revenge. Rousey threw Triple H through a table and was slapped by Stephanie before eventually signing her contract. The following night on Raw, Stephanie was forced to apologize. As she was leaving the ring, Triple H attacked Angle. The following week, Stephanie said Rousey could choose any Raw wrestler as her opponent at WrestleMania except the champion; she chose Stephanie. When Triple H objected, Angle pointed out that both Triple H and Stephanie had contracts as wrestlers and scheduled a mixed tag team match pitting Stephanie and Triple H against Rousey and himself. A Q&A session on the final Raw before WrestleMania ended with Stephanie putting Rousey through a table.

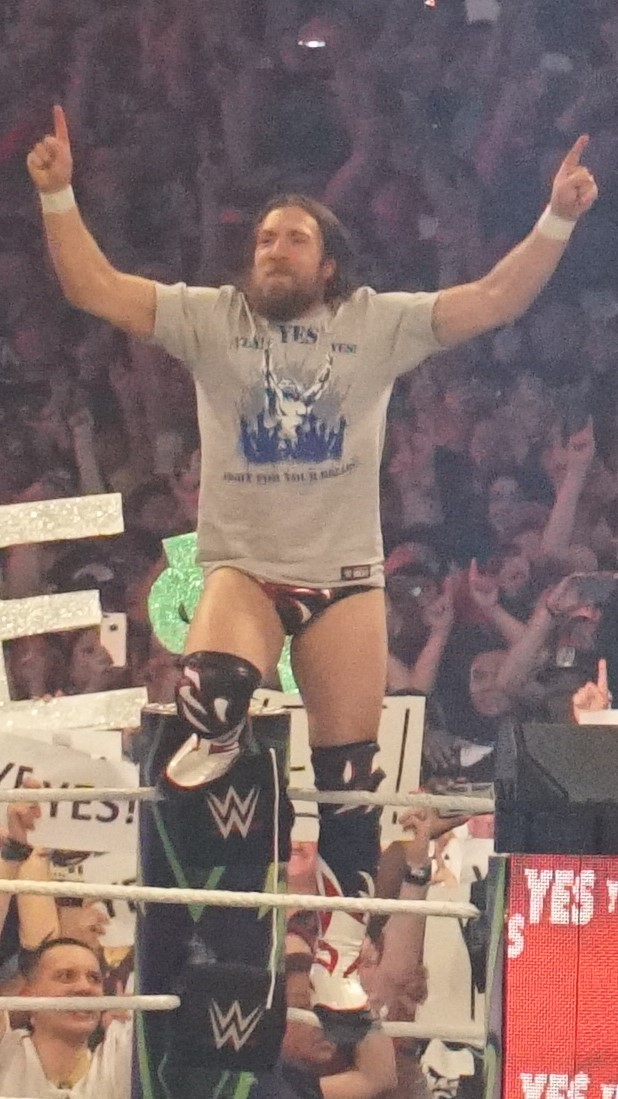
Daniel Bryan made his in-ring return at WrestleMania 34; he had been forced to retire due to concussions, but after extensive examinations, he was cleared to compete again.

Throughout the summer of 2017, Kevin Owens feuded with SmackDown Commissioner Shane McMahon; at Hell in a Cell, Kevin Owens defeated Shane in a Hell in a Cell match thanks to the help of his friend-turned-rival, Sami Zayn. Zayn explained that he acted out of disappointment about not getting the expected opportunities at SmackDown and realized that Owens was right all along in his questionable actions. Owens and Zayn continued their feud with Shane, including attacking him at Survivor Series and Shane threatened to fire them if they lost their match at Clash of Champions, while SmackDown General Manager Daniel Bryan seemingly favored the two by giving them WWE Championship opportunities at the Royal Rumble, when AJ Styles retained his title in a handicap match and again at Fastlane, when Owens and Zayn were among the five challengers. During the latter match, the feud escalated as Shane broke up pinfall attempts by Owens and Zayn. Shane then took an indefinite leave of absence, however, before leaving, he scheduled Owens and Zayn to fight each other at WrestleMania 34. Owens and Zayn reacted by attacking Shane. The following week, Daniel Bryan revealed that he was medically cleared to compete again; his last match was in April 2015. Later, Bryan fired Owens and Zayn for their attack on Shane and was attacked himself. In response, Bryan said he regretted favoring them and scheduled a tag team match featuring himself and Shane against Owens and Zayn, with the latter duo being rehired if they won.

At Fastlane, Randy Orton won the United States Championship from Bobby Roode. Following the match, Jinder Mahal, who felt that he should have been in the match, attacked both men. On the following episode of SmackDown, Roode invoked his rematch clause for WrestleMania 34. The following week, Orton was scheduled to defend the United States Championship in a triple threat match against Roode and Mahal at WrestleMania. On the March 27 episode, after the team of Mahal and Rusev defeated the team of Orton and Roode, Rusev demanded to be added to the title match since he pinned Orton. The match was subsequently changed to a fatal four-way.

Throughout 2017, The Usos (Jey Uso and Jimmy Uso) and The New Day (Big E, Kofi Kingston, and Xavier Woods) fought at various events over the SmackDown Tag Team Championship. The original feud ended at Hell in a Cell in October with The Usos victorious. The New Day earned another title shot at Fastlane in March, however, both teams were attacked by The Bludgeon Brothers (Harper and Rowan), injuring Jey, Kingston, and Woods. On the following episode of SmackDown, Big E and Jimmy teamed up to exact revenge in a losing effort. On the March 27 episode, New Day lost to The Bludgeon Brothers by disqualification after The Usos attacked the latter. A triple threat tag team match for the SmackDown Tag Team Championship was then scheduled for WrestleMania 34.

Determined to compete at WrestleMania 34, free agent John Cena entered himself into the Royal Rumble match to earn himself a world championship match at WrestleMania; Cena made it to the final three but was eliminated. He then qualified for Raw's Elimination Chamber match, hoping to earn a shot at the Universal Championship at WrestleMania, and, using his free agent status, was among the five challengers in the WWE Championship match at SmackDown's Fastlane, but came up short in both attempts. Back on Raw, Cena pondered attending WrestleMania as a fan, but then decided to challenge The Undertaker, whom he had tried to challenge a few weeks prior; Cena stated that it was not WWE executives who were preventing the match, but Undertaker himself. Over the remaining weeks leading up to WrestleMania, Cena received no answer, despite repeatedly antagonizing Undertaker. On the final Raw before WrestleMania, Cena declared he would not take a spot from any full-time wrestler in one of the other matches. He stated he was not mad about not having a match, but was mad at Undertaker for not answering.

==== Pre-show matches ====
On January 23, 2018, WWE Cruiserweight Champion Enzo Amore was released from WWE, vacating the title. A separate general manager was then appointed for 205 Live, which was previously controlled by the Raw General Manager, to address the situation. On the January 30 episode of 205 Live, new general manager Drake Maverick scheduled a 16-man single elimination tournament to crown a new WWE Cruiserweight Champion, culminating with the finals at WrestleMania 34. The tournament took place over the next several weeks, with Cedric Alexander and Mustafa Ali advancing to the finals at WrestleMania's pre show for the vacant title.

On the March 12 episode of Raw, a battle royal open to any female performer of any brand was scheduled for WrestleMania 34. The match, originally named in honor of WWE Hall of Famer The Fabulous Moolah, was introduced to serve as a female counterpart to the annual André the Giant Memorial Battle Royal. However, a few days later, the match was renamed "WrestleMania Women's Battle Royal" due to backlash from fans and critics regarding Moolah's past treatment of other women. Like the men's match, the winner received a trophy, and both the men's and women's battle royals were scheduled for the Kickoff pre-show. The main storyline going into the women's match was the increasingly strained friendship between Bayley and Sasha Banks. At Elimination Chamber, Banks turned on Bayley in the namesake match. Banks then was the first to note her participation in the battle royal on the March 19 episode of Raw. A week later, Bayley confirmed her participation and was confronted by Banks, resulting in a backstage brawl. On the final Raw before WrestleMania, Banks saved Bayley from a post-match ambush by Absolution's Sonya Deville and Mandy Rose. Banks expected Bayley to be grateful, but the two instead fought.

== Event ==
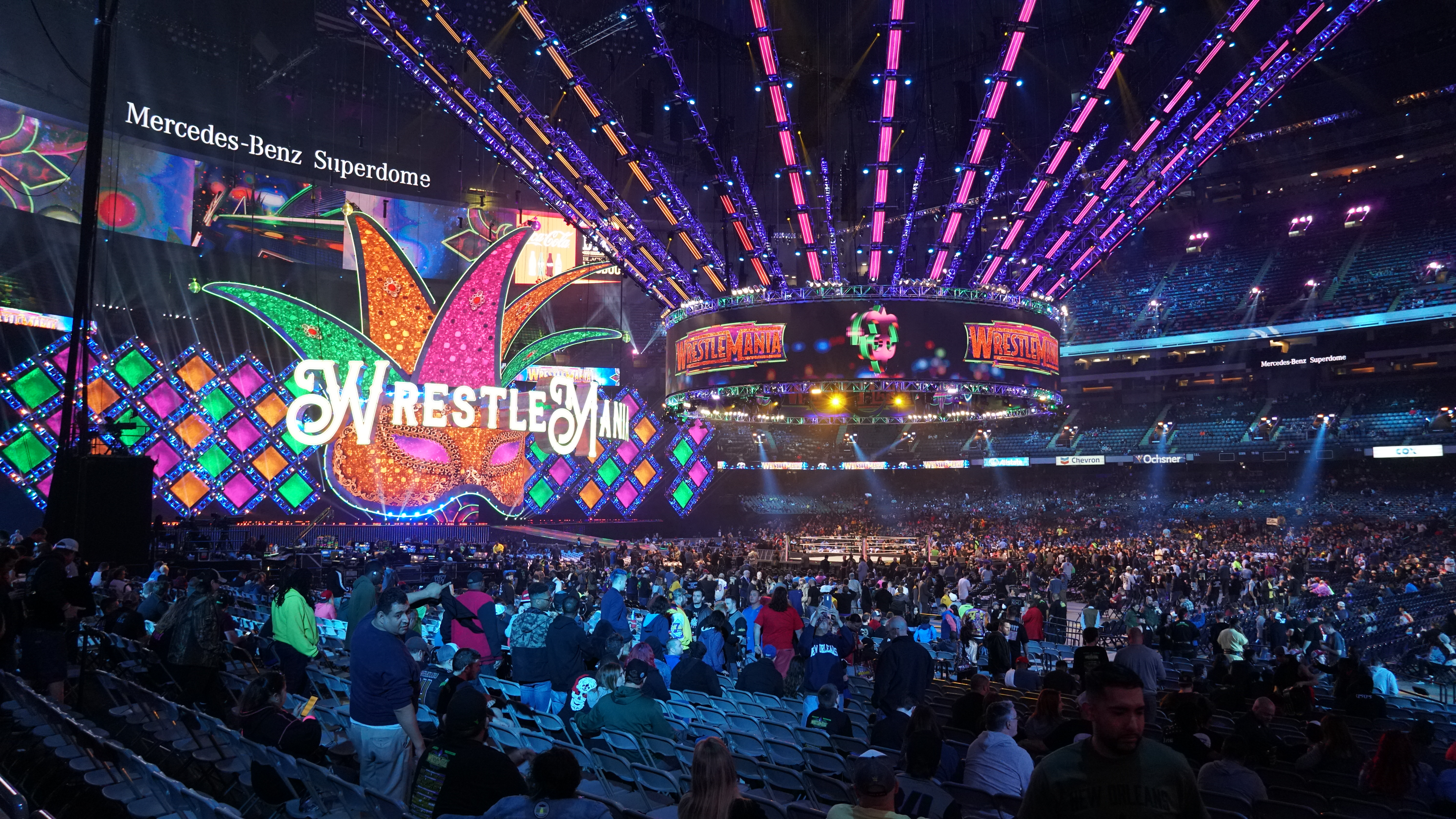
Mercedes-Benz Superdome during WrestleMania 34

Other on-screen personnel
Role:	Name:
English commentators	Michael Cole (Raw/Women's Battle Royal)
English commentators	Corey Graves (Raw/SmackDown/Women's Battle Royal)
English commentators	Jonathan Coachman (Raw)
English commentators	Tom Phillips (SmackDown)
English commentators	Byron Saxton (SmackDown/André the Giant Battle Royal)
English commentators	Vic Joseph (Cruiserweight match)
English commentators	Nigel McGuinness (Cruiserweight match)
English commentators	Jim Ross (André the Giant Battle Royal)
English commentators	Jerry Lawler (André the Giant Battle Royal)
English commentators	Beth Phoenix (Women's Battle Royal)
English commentators	Paige (Women's Battle Royal)
German commentators	Carsten Schaefer
German commentators	Tim Haber
German commentators	Calvin Knie
Portuguese commentators	Marco Alfaro
Portuguese commentators	Roberto Figueroa
Spanish commentators	Carlos Cabrera
Spanish commentators	Marcelo Rodríguez
Ring announcers	Greg Hamilton (SmackDown)
Ring announcers	JoJo (Raw)
Ring announcers	Lilian Garcia (Women's Battle Royal)
Referees	Danilo Anfibio
Referees	Jason Ayers
Referees	Shawn Bennett
Referees	Jessika Carr
Referees	Mike Chioda
Referees	John Cone
Referees	Dan Engler
Referees	Darrick Moore
Referees	Chad Patton
Referees	Charles Robinson
Referees	Darryl Sharma
Referees	Drake Wuertz
Referees	Rod Zapata
Interviewer	Charly Caruso
Pre-show panel	Renee Young
Pre-show panel	Booker T
Pre-show panel	Peter Rosenberg
Pre-show panel	David Otunga
Pre-show panel	John "Bradshaw" Layfield
Pre-show correspondent	Sam Roberts

=== Pre-show ===
Three matches were contested on the two-hour long WrestleMania 34 Kickoff pre-show, with the second hour shown live on USA Network. During the pre-show, it was shown that John Cena had indeed attended the event as a fan, and cameras followed him as he took his seat in the audience, a few rows back from the ring.

The first match on the pre-show was the fifth annual André the Giant Memorial Battle Royal. In the closing moments, "Woken" Matt Hardy, Mojo Rawley, and Baron Corbin were the final three competitors. Bray Wyatt, who had previously feuded with Hardy, appeared and surprisingly, Wyatt assisted Hardy in eliminating Rawley and distracted Corbin, As a result, Hardy then eliminated Corbin to win the match and trophy.

Next, Cedric Alexander faced Mustafa Ali in the tournament final for the vacant WWE Cruiserweight Championship. Ali performed a "054" on Alexander, who broke the pinfall attempt by placing his foot on the bottom rope. In the end, Alexander executed a "Lumbar Check" on Ali to win the title.

The WrestleMania Women's Battle Royal culminated in Sasha Banks and Bayley teaming up to eliminate Natalya and The Riott Squad (Ruby Riott, Sarah Logan, and Liv Morgan). Banks and Bayley then shook hands only for Bayley to quickly eliminate Banks. Thinking she had won the match, Bayley began celebrating, not realizing that Naomi had not actually been eliminated. Naomi then performed a "Rear View" on Bayley and eliminated her to win the match.

=== Preliminary matches ===
The actual pay-per-view opened with The Miz defending the Intercontinental Championship against Seth Rollins and Finn Bálor in a triple threat match. In the end, Bálor performed a Coup de Gráce on Miz, only for Rollins to perform a Curb Stomp on Bálor on top of Miz. Rollins then performed another Curb Stomp on Miz to win the title, becoming the 19th Grand Slam Champion in the process.

Next, Charlotte Flair defended the SmackDown Women's Championship against Asuka. After an evenly contested match, Charlotte forced Asuka to submit to the Figure-Eight Leglock to retain the title and end Asuka's undefeated streak, coincidentally mimicking the end of The Undertaker's streak by Brock Lesnar at WrestleMania XXX, which was also held at the same venue four years prior. After the match, the two embraced.

After that, Randy Orton defended the United States Championship against Bobby Roode, Jinder Mahal (accompanied by Sunil Singh), and Rusev (accompanied by Aiden English) in a fatal four-way match. In the climax, Singh distracted Rusev which allowed Mahal to perform the Khallas on Rusev to win the title.

Next, Kurt Angle and Ronda Rousey faced Triple H and Stephanie McMahon in a mixed tag team match, which was Rousey's in-ring debut and Stephanie's first match at WrestleMania and Angle's first since WrestleMania 22. Angle and Triple H started the match, while Stephanie distracted the referee to attack Rousey. Rousey eventually tagged in and faced off with Stephanie. She also faced off against Triple H and at one point in the match had Triple H on her shoulders. Angle performed an Angle Slam on Triple H for a nearfall, Triple H then executed a Pedigree on Angle, but Rousey broke up the pin. In the end, Rousey forced Stephanie to submit to an armbar for the win.

In the next match, The Usos (Jey Uso and Jimmy Uso) defended the SmackDown Tag Team Championship against The New Day (Big E and Kofi Kingston, accompanied by Xavier Woods) and The Bludgeon Brothers (Harper and Rowan) in a triple threat tag team match. In the end, Harper pinned Kingston after an aided superbomb to win the titles.

John Cena had attended the first two matches in the audience until a referee had informed him that The Undertaker had arrived at the arena. Following the SmackDown Tag Team Championship match, Cena made his entrance for an expected match with Undertaker. The lights went out, but instead of The Undertaker, Elias appeared. After a brief confrontation, Cena attacked Elias. As Cena was leaving, the lights went out again and Undertaker's coat and hat (which had been left behind at WrestleMania 33) appeared in the ring and were struck by lightning. The Undertaker then made his entrance to the panicked shock of Cena and the match was made official. Undertaker dominated most of the match and utilized his Old School and flying clothesline maneuvers. Cena countered a chokeslam attempt into a spin-out powerbomb. As Cena attempted a Five-Knuckle Shuffle, Undertaker sat up and performed a chokeslam followed by a Tombstone Piledriver to defeat Cena, extending the Undertaker's WrestleMania record to 24–2. This would prove to be Undertaker's final WrestleMania match in front of a live audience, as he retired in 2020.

Next, Daniel Bryan teamed with Shane McMahon to face Kevin Owens and Sami Zayn with the stipulation that if Owens and Zayn won, they would be rehired to SmackDown. Before the match began, Owens and Zayn attacked Bryan and Shane. Owens powerbombed Bryan onto the ring apron, temporarily taking Bryan out of the match. Shane decided to face Owens and Zayn alone and the match officially started. Owens and Zayn dominated the match until Bryan recovered. Zayn performed a Blue Thunder Bomb on Shane for a nearfall. Zayn performed a Helluva Kick on Bryan for a near-fall. Owens tagged in and performed a Pop-Up Powerbomb, but Bryan kicked out again. In the end, Bryan forced Zayn to submit to the Yes Lock to win the match. Per the match's stipulation, Owens and Zayn remained fired from SmackDown.

Next, Alexa Bliss (accompanied by Mickie James) defended the Raw Women's Championship against Nia Jax. Jax attacked James before the match began, eliminating James as a distraction. In the end, Jax executed a Samoan drop on Bliss from the second rope to win her first Raw Women's Championship.

In the following match, AJ Styles defended the WWE Championship against Royal Rumble winner Shinsuke Nakamura. At the conclusion of the match, Styles performed a Phenomenal Forearm, and Nakamura performed a Kinshasa to the back of Styles' neck, both for nearfalls. In the end, Styles countered Nakamura's attempt at a Kinshasa into a Styles Clash to win the match and retain the title. After the match, the two showed mutual respect for each other. Nakamura kneeled down to present Styles with the WWE Championship, but then attacked him with a low blow and a Kinshasa on the floor, thus turning heel.

In the penultimate match, Cesaro and Sheamus defended the Raw Tag Team Championship against Braun Strowman and a partner of his choosing. After all three men were in the ring, Strowman said he waited until then to reveal his partner, which would be a random fan from the live audience. Strowman went out into the crowd and chose 10-year-old Nicholas, son of referee John Cone. Strowman and Nicholas won the titles after Strowman performed a running powerslam on Cesaro. With this win, Nicholas became the youngest WWE champion in history.

=== Main event ===
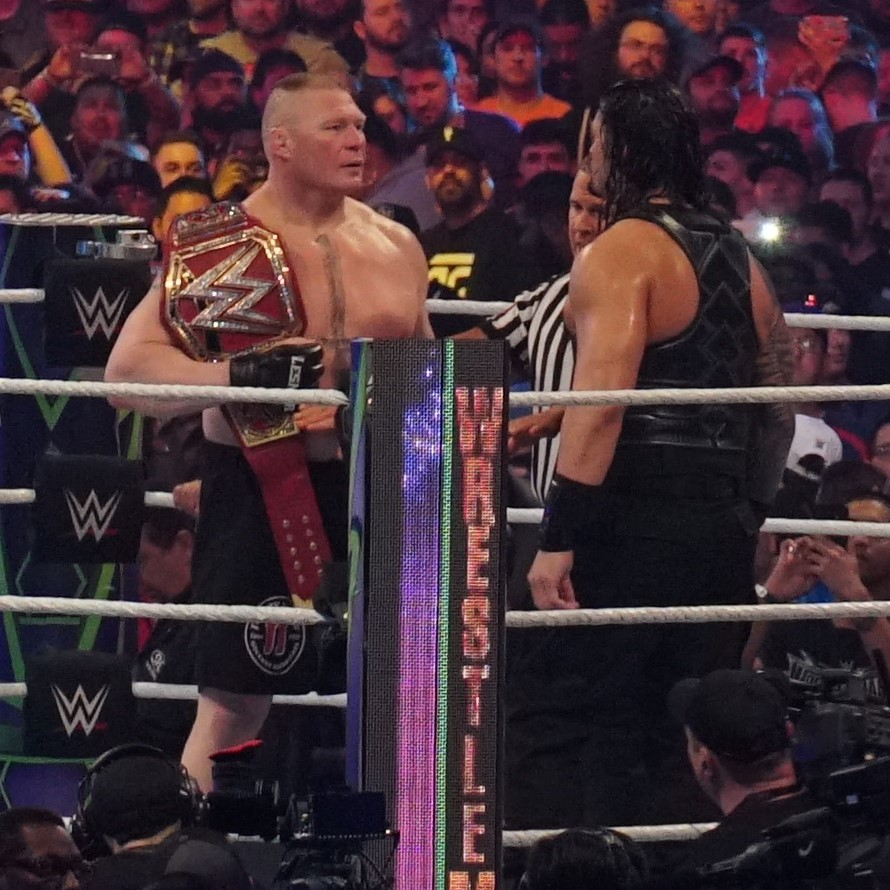
Brock Lesnar and Roman Reigns just prior to their main event match for Raw's Universal Championship at WrestleMania 34

In the main event, Brock Lesnar (accompanied by Paul Heyman) defended the Universal Championship against Roman Reigns. Lesnar performed three german suplexes on Reigns, who performed superman punches and two Spears on Lesnar for a nearfall. Lesnar performed two F-5s on Reigns with each scoring a nearfall. Frustrated, Lesnar put Reigns through an announce table with an F-5 and performed another one in the ring scoring another nearfall. Lesnar removed his gloves and attacked Reigns with elbow strikes, causing Reigns to bleed profusely from the head and performed a fifth F-5 for a near-fall. Reigns recovered and performed two more Spears on Lesnar for a near-fall. In the end, as Reigns attempted another Spear, Lesnar countered into a sixth F-5 to retain the Universal Championship, and become the fifth heel to win in the main event of WrestleMania. The match would perhaps end up being more notable due the majority of the crowd signaling their strong disinterest by chanting among other things "boring", "this is awful" and calling for then-former WWE wrestler CM Punk. Even beach balls were also thrown around the crowd which resulted in cheers and boos.

== Reception ==
Jack de Menezes, writing for The Independent, stated that WrestleMania 34 "brought a mix of brilliance, bemusement and disappointment". The Intercontinental title triple threat was "brilliant" and "frantic", the WWE Title match was an "eye-catching affair" culminating in a "stunning heel-turn", "Rousey made a splash on her in-ring debut", and "Daniel Bryan once again captured the imagination of the WWE Universe". Cena-Undertaker left "fans stunned, bemused and feeling shortchanged at what had occurred", while finally the main event was a "slow-burning match" which was "a huge anti-climax".

Dave Meltzer of the Wrestling Observer noted that the main event was "physical as hell", but the "crowd seemed to react more to beach balls in the crowd" and "didn't even pop for" Reigns' kick-outs. Meltzer felt that the match was "done for sympathy for Reigns when it was over to make him a babyface as they concentrated on showing him all beaten up". For the other matches, Meltzer noted that the women's battle royal "was rushed through" and it was not the first of its kind at WrestleMania as promoted, pointing to a previous version in 2009. The Intercontinental title triple threat was "all action" which "felt like three babyfaces" as the Miz "didn't work as a heel at all in the match." He thought Asuka-Charlotte was "a great match" with "hard hitting and pretty emotional stuff", while the mixed tag team match was "excellent"; he noted that Ronda Rousey "at no point looked out of her element, she was crisp in just about everything", and that it was "one of the better pro wrestling debuts I've ever seen". Finally, Meltzer noted that the announced attendance of 78,133 "isn't even close to real although it may be August before the real number is out".

Joshua Needelman of The Washington Post wrote that this event was "one of the most entertaining WrestleMania's in recent memory" except for an "anticlimactic" and "remarkably disastrous end", as the "New Orleans crowd made it clear the main event was not what they wanted", which saw them booing Reigns. Meanwhile, the Styles-Nakamura match was "surprisingly slow and plodding, with the intensity only reaching its expected level toward the end". Also, the mixed tag match "exceeded expectations", while the U.S. title match result drew the ire of fans because "fan-favorite Rusev" was pinned. Lastly, Needelman noted that Daniel Bryan, "perhaps the most popular wrestler of the past decade", "had the crowd in the palm of his hands" during his match.

Wade Keller of Pro Wrestling Torch described the Lesnar-Reigns main event as a "disaster". Keller noted that the "tired and disinterested crowd" had booed Reigns and chanted "CM Punk", "Boring" and "This is awful!" As for the other matches, Styles-Nakamura was "a letdown" given the expectations, Cena-Undertaker was "crowd pleasing", the mixed tag match "went about as well as anyone could have hoped", and Asuka failing to "really showcase her signature spots before losing" "almost felt like a downgrade in Vince McMahon's faith in her".

Troy L. Smith of Cleveland.com wrote, "In my mind, Lesnar-Reigns is one of the four worst WrestleMania main events ever, based on build, execution and immediate aftermath". After comparing the four aforementioned events, Smith concluded that the WrestleMania 34 main event was indeed the worst due to the "utter disdain" it produced, with there never being a more "disinterested" crowd for a WrestleMania main event. Smith also rated the main event as the "worst match of the night", but in contrast, he felt that the rest of WrestleMania 34 was "pretty great for most of its seven hours".

== Aftermath ==
=== Raw ===
In recent years, WWE has gone out of its way to warn viewers that the post-WrestleMania Raw crowd are "non-traditional" and will "boo the guys they normally cheer (face)" and "cheer the guys they normally boo (heel)". This announcement was repeated after WrestleMania 34, but critics pointed out that the crowd cheered wrestlers "regardless of whether they are babyfaces or heels" and that "on this night, they cheered everyone that WWE wanted them to cheer with one exception... Roman Reigns."

On the post-WrestleMania 34 episode of Raw, Commissioner Stephanie McMahon, with her arm in a brace, bragged about her WrestleMania performance, stating she knew that she would bring out the best in Ronda Rousey. Rousey then made her entrance and listened to Stephanie praising her. When the two hugged, Ronda grabbed Stephanie's arm, pulled the brace off, and applied the armbar.

Also on Raw, another Universal Championship match between champion Brock Lesnar and challenger Roman Reigns was scheduled for the Greatest Royal Rumble event, this time as a Steel Cage match, with no justification given for the match. Reigns acknowledged that Lesnar had re-signed with WWE instead of going back to the UFC, then said he was not directly told about the rematch and alleged that there was a conspiracy against him. After Reigns concluded that he would eventually beat Lesnar if he kept receiving title matches against him, a returning Samoa Joe appeared. Joe called Reigns a failure and said that after Lesnar defeats him at Greatest Royal Rumble, Joe would be waiting for Reigns at Backlash.

New Raw Women's Champion Nia Jax had a tag team match against Alexa Bliss and Mickie James. Nia's partner was NXT call-up Ember Moon. The team won after Moon performed the Eclipse on Bliss for the pin. Also in the women's division, Sasha Banks lost to Absolution's Mandy Rose, when interference by Bayley backfired. A match between Banks and Bayley the following week ended in a no-contest when the two were attacked by The Riott Squad, who were traded to Raw.

Backstage, Braun Strowman and Nicholas informed Raw General Manager Kurt Angle that they were relinquishing the Raw Tag Team Championship due to Nicholas' schedule as a fourth grader, but vowed to come back for the title when Nicholas was done with school. When Cesaro and Sheamus demanded their titles back, Angle said they could regain them at the Greatest Royal Rumble. A four-team tournament to determine their opponents, called the Tag Team Eliminator, was won by André the Giant Memorial Battle Royal winner "Woken" Matt Hardy and Bray Wyatt.

New Intercontinental Champion Seth Rollins was interrupted by Finn Bálor. The Miz then came out and said that he wanted his contractual rematch at Backlash. Jeff Hardy then returned from injury and teamed with Rollins and Bálor in a winning effort against Miz and The Miztourage. The following week, Miz was traded to SmackDown, splitting him from The Miztourage, who remained on Raw and were later renamed to The B-Team.

Kevin Owens and Sami Zayn appeared on Raw, seeking jobs from General Manager Kurt Angle. Angle scheduled a match between the two, with the winner receiving a Raw contract. However, the match ended in a double countout with neither receiving a contract. The following week during the Superstar Shake-up, Commissioner Stephanie McMahon overruled Angle and awarded Owens and Zayn each a Raw contract.

=== SmackDown ===
On the first SmackDown after WrestleMania, Commissioner Shane McMahon announced that Daniel Bryan – now a full-time wrestler on the SmackDown brand – resigned as General Manager, and introduced Paige, who retired from in-ring competition the previous night on Raw due to injuries, as Bryan's successor. She then scheduled a match between Daniel Bryan and WWE Champion AJ Styles. Shinsuke Nakamura, who had issued a mocking apology for attacking Styles, attacked both Bryan and Styles during their match. The following week, a rematch between Styles and Nakamura for the championship was scheduled for the Greatest Royal Rumble.

The Usos earned a SmackDown Tag Team Championship match against The Bludgeon Brothers at Greatest Royal Rumble by defeating The New Day. Also, Randy Orton defeated Bobby Roode and Rusev in a triple threat match to earn a United States Championship match. Following this, new United States Champion Jinder Mahal was traded to Raw, but lost the title to Jeff Hardy, who moved to SmackDown. The winner of the championship match between Mahal and Hardy at Greatest Royal Rumble would face Orton at Backlash.

SmackDown Women's Champion Charlotte Flair commented on her WrestleMania match and future challengers, but was interrupted and attacked by NXT's The IIconics (Peyton Royce and Billie Kay). After this, Carmella cashed in her Money in the Bank contract and won the title. Also in the women's division, Natalya confronted Naomi, calling her victory in the WrestleMania Women's Battle Royal a disappointment. Naomi then defeated Natalya in a match. It was later revealed that soon after Flair's title win at Wrestlemania 34, she became seriously ill after getting silicone poisoning which resulted from her breast implants leaking.

=== 205 Live ===
On 205 Live, Cedric Alexander celebrated becoming WWE Cruiserweight Champion, with Mustafa Ali showing his respect. Buddy Murphy then attacked the new champion from behind and performed Murphy's Law on him.

== Results ==
No.	Results	Stipulations	Times
1^{P}	Matt Hardy won by last eliminating Baron Corbin (Note: Order of elimination: Aiden English, Konnor, Curt Hawkins, R-Truth, Primo Colon, Mike Kanellis, Tyler Breeze, Viktor, Zack Ryder, Karl Anderson, Luke Gallows, Apollo, Shelton Benjamin, Rhyno, Dash Wilder, Scott Dawson, Bo Dallas, Curtis Axel, Sin Cara, Fandango, Heath Slater, Chad Gable, Titus O'Neil, Goldust, Tye Dillinger, Dolph Ziggler, Kane, Mojo Rawley, Baron Corbin)	30-man André the Giant Memorial Battle Royal for the André the Giant Memorial Trophy	15:45
2^{P}	Cedric Alexander defeated Mustafa Ali by pinfall	Tournament final for the vacant WWE Cruiserweight Championship	12:20
3^{P}	Naomi won by last eliminating Bayley (Note: Order of elimination: Carmella, Dana Brooke, Mandy Rose, Sonya Deville, Kairi Sane, Lana, Kavita Devi, Taynara Conti, Bianca Belair, Dakota Kai, Becky Lynch, Mickie James, Peyton Royce, Natalya, Liv Morgan, Ruby Riott, Sarah Logan, Sasha Banks, Bayley)	20-woman WrestleMania Women's Battle Royal for the WrestleMania Women's Battle Royal Trophy	9:50
4	Seth Rollins defeated The Miz (c) and Finn Bálor by pinfall	Triple threat match for the WWE Intercontinental Championship	15:30
5	Charlotte Flair (c) defeated Asuka by submission	Singles match for the WWE SmackDown Women's Championship	13:05
6	Jinder Mahal (with Sunil Singh) defeated Randy Orton (c), Bobby Roode, and Rusev (with Aiden English) by pinfall	Fatal four-way match for the WWE United States Championship	8:15
7	Kurt Angle and Ronda Rousey defeated Triple H and Stephanie McMahon by submission	Mixed tag team match	20:40
8	The Bludgeon Brothers (Harper and Rowan) defeated The Usos (Jey Uso and Jimmy Uso) (c) and The New Day (Big E and Kofi Kingston) (with Xavier Woods) by pinfall	Triple threat tag team match for the WWE SmackDown Tag Team Championship	5:50
9	The Undertaker defeated John Cena by pinfall	Singles match	2:45
10	Daniel Bryan and Shane McMahon defeated Kevin Owens and Sami Zayn by submission	Tag team match Had Owens and Zayn won, they would have been rehired to SmackDown.	15:25
11	Nia Jax defeated Alexa Bliss (c) (with Mickie James) by pinfall	Singles match for the WWE Raw Women's Championship	10:15
12	AJ Styles (c) defeated Shinsuke Nakamura by pinfall	Singles match for the WWE Championship	20:20
13	Braun Strowman and Nicholas (Note: Nicholas is the son of WWE referee John Cone and was picked from the venue's crowd by Strowman.) defeated Cesaro and Sheamus (c) by pinfall	Tag team match for the WWE Raw Tag Team Championship	4:00
14	Brock Lesnar (c) (with Paul Heyman) defeated Roman Reigns by pinfall	Singles match for the WWE Universal Championship	15:55
(c) / – the champion(s) heading into the match; P / – the match was broadcast on the pre-show

=== WWE Cruiserweight Championship Tournament ===
1st Round; 205 Live; January 30 – February 20, 2018
Cedric Alexander	Pinfall
Gran Metalik	9:27
TJP	Pinfall
Tyler Bate	14:31
Kalisto	Pinfall
Lince Dorado	11:37
Roderick Strong	Pinfall
Hideo Itami	17:04
Akira Tozawa	12:28
Mark Andrews	Pinfall
Drew Gulak	Submission
Tony Nese	16:10
Buddy Murphy	Pinfall
Ariya Daivari	7:46
Mustafa Ali	Pinfall
Gentleman Jack Gallagher	17:08

Quarterfinals; 205 Live; February 27 – March 6, 2018
Cedric Alexander	Pinfall
TJP	17:21
Kalisto	11:39
Roderick Strong	Pinfall
Mark Andrews	12:10
Drew Gulak	Submission
Buddy Murphy	11:05
Mustafa Ali	Pinfall

Semifinals; 205 Live; March 13–20, 2018
Cedric Alexander	Pinfall
Roderick Strong	14:54
Drew Gulak	15:13
Mustafa Ali	Pinfall

Final; WrestleMania 34; April 8, 2018
Cedric Alexander	Pinfall
Mustafa Ali	12:20
