= John Cone =

American professional wrestling referee

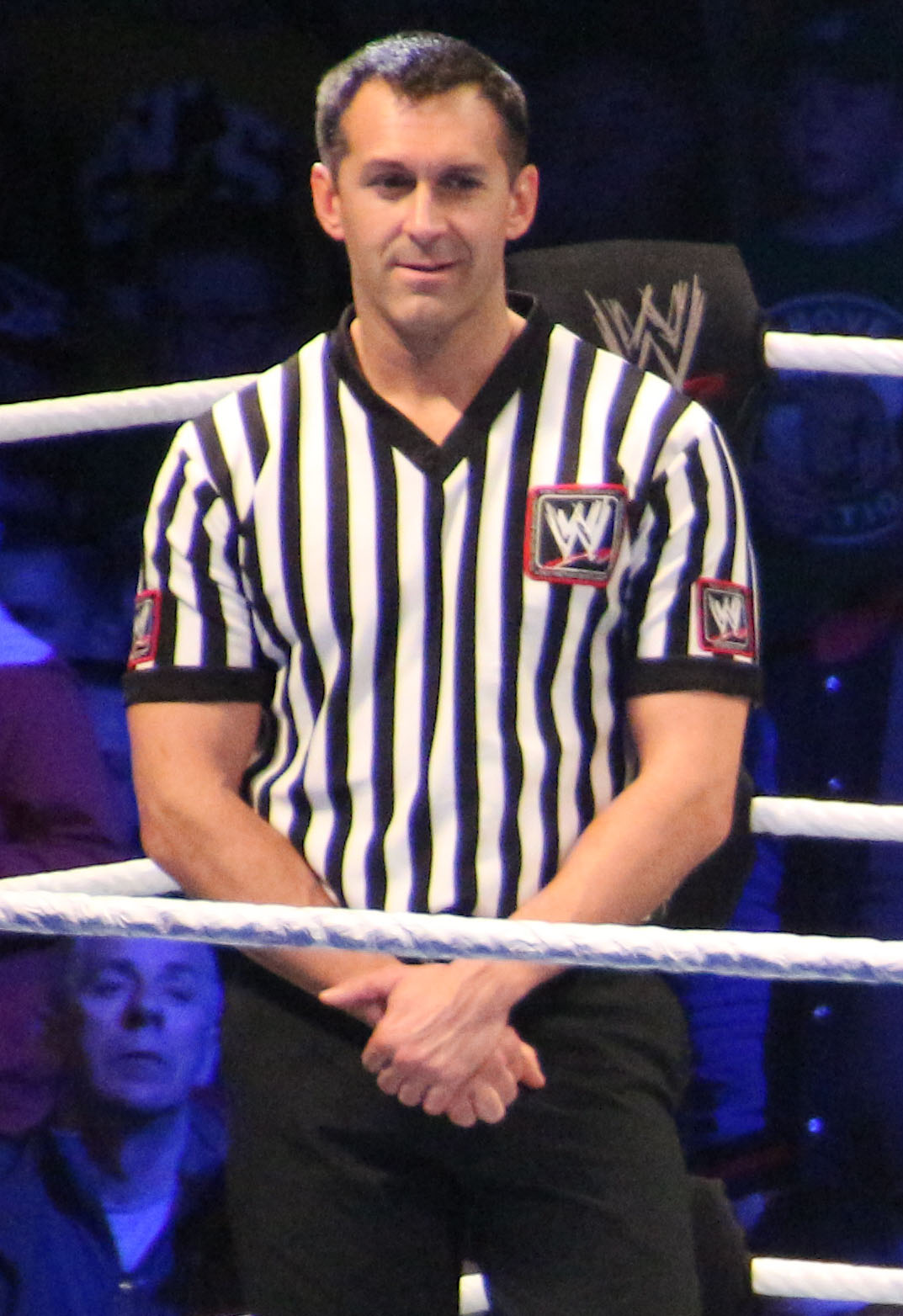
- Cone in 2013

Personal information
- Born: November 16, 1974 (age 51) Kansas City, Missouri, U.S.
- Spouse: Lauren Cone
- Children: 2 (Nicholas and Thomas)

Professional wrestling career
- Ring name: John Cone
- Billed height: 5 ft 9 in (1.75 m)
- Billed weight: 174 lb (79 kg)
- Debut: August 1995

John Cone (born November 16, 1974) is an American professional wrestling referee. He is signed to WWE as a referee and appears on the Raw brand. Cone also works in the corporate role of vice president of talent relations for WWE.

== Professional wrestling career ==
=== WWE (2006–2022) ===
==== Referee (1996-2022) ====
Cone started refereeing independent wrestling matches in August 1996.

Cone debuted as a referee for WWE in 2006, he refereed his last WWE match in 2022.

==== Vice President of Talent Relations (2022-present) ====
Midway through 2022, Cone transitioned from in-ring duties to taking on more backstage responsibilities. By the end of 2022, Cone had retired from being a referee and was promoted to vice president of talent relations.

== Video games ==
Cone's likeness appears as a referee in 2K Sports WWE 2K24.

== Personal life ==
Cone was born in Kansas City, Missouri where he and his wife are owners of a Donut King.

At WrestleMania 34, Cone's 10-year-old son, Nicholas, was "chosen" out of the audience by Braun Strowman to be his tag-team partner to challenge for the WWE Raw Tag Team Championship in a match refereed by Cone. They won their match against The Bar, making Nicholas the youngest champion in any category in WWE history, but they relinquished the title the following night on Raw.

== Filmography ==
=== Web series ===
Year	Title	Role	Notes
2017	Southpaw Regional Wrestling	Chip Henderson	Referee
2020	UpUpDownDown'	Himself	Referee (Playing UNO with Xavier Woods)
