= Glenn Kulka =

Canadian professional wrestler

Personal information
- Born: March 3, 1964 (age 62) Edmonton, Alberta, Canada

Professional wrestling career
- Ring name(s): Glenn Kulka; Glen Kulka
- Billed height: 6 ft 3 in (1.91 m)
- Billed weight: 275 lb (125 kg)
- Trained by: Bret Hart; Leo Burke
- Debut: 1997
- Retired: 2000

Glenn Kulka (born March 3, 1964) is a Canadian retired professional wrestler, hockey, and football player who competed in Canadian independent promotions during the late 1990s and had a brief stint in the World Wrestling Federation in 1997.

He also, at one time, held the North American pro football bench press record, pressing 225 pounds for 53 reps.

== Career ==
=== Early career ===
Born in Edmonton, Alberta to Stan and Jeannine Kulka, (the youngest of four children) Glenn Kulka began playing hockey in the British Columbia Hockey League with the Cowichan Valley Capitals in 1980 and the Medicine Hat Tigers, Spokane Flyers and the Nanaimo Islanders in the Western Hockey League from 1981 to 1983. Kulka then was a standout defensive lineman for two years (1984 and 1985) with the Bakersfield College Renegades in the PAC 9 JC Conference of California. While in Bakersfield, Kulka had "Gotta Win" tattooed on his left shoulder. He signed his first professional contract, in 1986, with the Edmonton Eskimos, (as an offensive lineman) later playing with Montreal, Toronto, Saskatchewan, and the Ottawa Rough Riders, where he was selected as a member of the Canadian All-Star Team.

While playing with the Ottawa Rough Riders, he was arrested and was fined $300 for cocaine possession in March 1992. The CFL also responded by issuing Kulka an additional $500 fine and was ordered to act as the organization's official anti-drug spokesman.

He later re-entered professional hockey joining the Hampton Roads Admirals in the East Coast Hockey League during 1993 and 1994. Kulka joined the Saskatchewan Roughriders in 1995 and, after teaming with Bret "The Hitman" Hart in a tag team match against "Million Dollar Man" Ted DiBiase and "Psycho" Sid Vicious in a fundraising event for the Roughriders, Kulka became interested in pursuing a career in professional wrestling.

Kulka later appeared with teammates Mike Anderson, Bobby Jurasin, and Scott Hendrickson on WWF Superstars supporting Bret Hart at ringside during a match against "Psycho" Sid Vicious and Ted DiBiase's Million Dollar Corporation which included King Kong Bundy, Kama, and Bodydonna Skip at the Regina Agridome in Regina, Saskatchewan on November 4, 1995.

Bret Hart later offered to train Kulka, and, with Leo Burke, Kulka spent the next two years training in Calgary, Alberta and later toured with Emile Dupree's Grand Prix Wrestling during the summer of 1997.

=== World Wrestling Federation ===
Later signed to a developmental contract with the WWF, he began appearing on WWF house shows in late-1997. He was ringside with Ahmed Johnson against Rocky Maivia and the Nation of Domination on November 7, 1997, at the Skydome in Toronto. Two days later, on November 10, 1997, at a television taping for Monday Night Raw, he defeated Sexton Hardcastle in a Dark Match at the Corel Center in Ottawa.

He later scored victories over Doug Furnas, Miguel Perez, Jr. and a young Edge before the end of the year and was also scheduled to make a one-night appearance with Team Canada at the 1997 Survivor Series with "British Bulldog" Davey Boy Smith, Jim "The Anvil" Neidhart, and Tiger Ali Singh against Team USA which included The Patriot, Vader, Dude Love, and Goldust on November 9, 1997 although Kulka and Singh were replaced with Doug Furnas & Phil LaFon while the Patriot and Dude Love were replaced by Marc Mero and Steve Blackman.

After suffering from broken leg during a match against The Jackyl in Regina during early 1998, Kulka was forced to undergo corrective surgery, remaining inactive for six months while in rehab. While recovering from his injury, he was invited to the WWF Training Dojo training under Dory Funk, Jr. and made several appearances at the Dojo teaming with Tom Howard against the Hardy Boyz on September 24. He also participated in a 14-man "WWF Dojo" Battle Royal at the NWA 50th Anniversary Show on October 24, 1998 won by Steve Williams.

He also appeared at the WWF Dojo teaming with Jose Estrada, Jr. against The Truth Commission (Recon & Sniper) on February 5, 1999.

=== Power Pro Wrestling ===
Sent to the Memphis-based Power Pro Wrestling, a WWF developmental territory, he made his first appearance coming to Michael Hayes' defense after being disqualified in a televised match against Baldo due to interference from Downtown Bruno on March 20, 1999. As members of manager Randy Hales stable attempted to attack Hayes after the match, a masked wrestler ran into the ring, giving Hayes a high five before suddenly turning on him.

After Downtown Bruno handcuffed Hayes, Kulka helped members of Hales' stable to carry Hayes out of the arena and into the trunk of a car driven by "Irish Assassin" Mick Tierney, who drove off with Hayes inside. In an interview following this incident, Randy Hales revealed the masked wrestler as Glenn Kulka, a former CFL player and "cousin" of Michael Hayes.

Aligning himself with Hales' group, he faced several veterans including Doug Furnas, "Dirty White Boy" Tony Anthony and Kurt Angle as well as teaming with JR Smooth and Mick Tierney during his feud with Allan Steele in early 1999. While there, he participated in two "Weapon Battle Royals" as well as an 8-man match for the Young Guns title against Kurt Angle, Allan Steele, Mick Tierney, Sebastian Bach, Derrick King, Bulldog Raines, and Vic Grimes on May 8, 1999.

=== Retirement ===
In 1999, Kulka defeated The Godfather by disqualification in a dark match before Raw in Memphis on June 21. This proved to be his last appearance with the company. Remaining with Power Pro Wrestling for the next several months, he and Mick Tierney were awarded the PPW Tag Team titles on October 2 after Bill Dundee left the promotion. However, the titles became vacant after Kulka left the promotion himself in November.

Released from his contract by the WWF in February 2000, he later feuded with Pierre-Carl Ouellet in Northern Championship Wrestling, facing him at ChallengeMania 8 in May 2000. Although alleged to be in negotiations with Extreme Championship Wrestling, Kulka retired from professional wrestling soon after his release.

=== Recent years ===
Returning to Ottawa, he endeavored to start a gym and managed a Ford car dealership. In 2004, Kulka was asked by Ottawa sports station The Team 1200 to cover on-field commentary for the Ottawa Renegades. This eventually led to a regular spot as a co-host for Team 1200's Over the Edge, a popular sports talk radio show on CFGO. However, as of November 27, 2009 Kulka was laid off by CHUM Radio due to cutbacks.

In late 2006, he made two guest appearances on the sports talk show Off the Record.

Kulka still lives in Ottawa, with his wife Mariko, and two children. He is one of several former CFL players to publicly admit to steroid use during his professional career.

He made his MMA debut against Wayne Xilon on the Freedom Fight Card held on July 26, 2008, at The Robert Guertin Arena in Gatineau, Quebec. Kulka defeated Xilon by TKO at 1:13 of the first round.

Kulka made another debut, acting as Charles the Wrestler in the Third Wall Theatre Company's production of Shakespeare's "As You Like It", held February 4 to 14, 2010.

In 2016, Kulka was arrested for an assault that occurred back in 2012, Kulka ended up pleading guilty to the charge.

== Championships and accomplishments ==
- Power Pro Wrestling
  - PPW Tag Team Championship (1 time) with Mick Tierney
- Pro Wrestling Illustrated
  - PWI ranked him # 392 of the 500 best singles wrestlers of the PWI 500 in 2000

== See also ==
- List of gridiron football players who became professional wrestlers
