= List of WWE developmental territories and brands =

From 1998 to 2012, WWE (formerly the World Wrestling Federation (WWF)) partnered with various independent professional wrestling promotions to train and develop future talent before being called up to its main roster, with the partner independent promotions being referred to as "developmental territories". The first promotion to serve as a developmental territory for WWE was World Wrestling Alliance (WWA) in Rockland, Massachusetts, which began operating as a developmental territory in 1998. Other notable promotions that served as developmental territories include Power Pro Wrestling (PPW), IWA Puerto Rico (IWA-PR), Ohio Valley Wrestling (OVW), and Deep South Wrestling (DSW), among others.

Beginning in 2012, after the folding of its final developmental territory, Florida Championship Wrestling (FCW), WWE would transition to developing talent in-house with the repositioning of NXT as a developmental brand for the promotion. Since its launch, the in-house NXT developmental system has come to include subsidiary brands like NXT UK and Evolve among others.

In 2024, WWE launched the WWE Independent Development (ID) program. The ID developmental system is used by WWE to support the training of independent professional wrestlers and provide them with a pathway to the promotion. To accomplish this, WWE partnered with various independent promotions and schools and provided them with an official ID designation; the first independent promotions and schools designated under WWE ID were Reality of Wrestling, Black and Brave Academy, Nightmare Factory, Elite Pro Wrestling Training Center, and KnokX Pro Academy. The WWE ID developmental wrestlers perform on the Evolve brand, with the goal of being moved on to NXT and eventually to the main roster, and on the independent circuit, notably on WWE ID Showcase events, which WWE co-promotes with independent promotions like Game Changer Wrestling (GCW).

== Background ==
Major professional wrestling promotions utilize developmental systems that allow inexperienced wrestlers to develop their skills and gain in-ring experience in smaller, often regional partner independent promotions before they are called up to perform in front of a national or global audience. These partner independent promotions are generally called "developmental territories".

WWE (then the WWF) first launched its official developmental system in 1998 after the closures of partner regional promotions Smoky Mountain Wrestling and the United States Wrestling Association, two of the last remaining "old school" wrestling territories in the United States, in the years prior. The first independent promotion to serve as a WWF developmental promotion was World Wrestling Alliance (WWA) in Rockland, Massachusetts. The WWF developmental wrestlers that performed in WWA were trained by Dory Funk Jr. and the staff of the Funkin' Dojo.

In 2001, the WWF purchased its main domestic competitor World Championship Wrestling (WCW); prior to the purchase, WCW operated two developmental territories: NWA Wildside in Cornelia, Georgia and the Heartland Wrestling Association (HWA) in Cincinnati, Ohio. The WWF terminated the relationship with NWA Wildside while the HWA continued to operate as a WWF developmental territory until 2002.

On August 14, 2012, the last independent developmental territory affiliated with WWE, the Steve Keirn-owned Florida Championship Wrestling (FCW) promotion, folded. As a replacement for FCW, WWE relaunched the NXT brand to serve as their official developmental system. WWE had launched the brand and the brand's weekly television program, WWE NXT, on February 23, 2010; the brand and program initially featured developmental talent from FCW participating in a reality show-style competition to become WWE's next "breakout star", with the help of mentors from WWE's Raw and SmackDown brands, before dropping the reality show elements in June 2012 to focus solely on talent training at the WWE Performance Center with tapings being held exclusively at Full Sail University in Winter Park, Florida. Wrestling critics and fans came to view NXT as its own distinct entity during this initial developmental period, with the brand's shows being praised for their high-quality matches and storylines. In the late 2010s and early 2020s, individuals in WWE began to refer to NXT as WWE's 'third brand', positioning it as part of the WWE's "main roster" alongside Raw and SmackDown, although many journalists still referred to NXT as developmental, with Raw and SmackDown solely viewed as WWE's main roster. In September 2022, following its defeat in the Wednesday Night Wars ratings rivalry, the NXT program was revamped as "NXT 2.0", with the brand reinstituting its original function as a developmental system. Also in 2022, WWE's two other developmental brands, NXT UK and 205 Live, which operated under the NXT system, were discontinued. In an interview on the Wednesday Night Wars and All Elite Wrestling's victorious Dynamite television program, WWE's chief content officer Paul "Triple H" Levesque dismissed the idea that NXT was anything other than a 'developmental system', stating: "People put so much pressure on [this] 'competitive war' [...] it never was that. [...] they beat our developmental system, good for them".

In 2021, WWE launched the WWE Recruit developmental system which includes the WWE Next in Line (NIL) and WWE Independent Development (ID) programs. The system supports the training and development of athletes at certain colleges, wrestling schools, and wrestling promotions. The NIL program was launched on December 2, 2021 and exclusively supports American-based college athletes who decide to train as professional wrestlers; the first WWE developmental wrestler signed under the NIL program was 2020 Summer Olympic gold medalist and two-time NCAA Division I national champion Gable Steveson. The ID program was launched on October 29, 2024 and is used by WWE to develop and support the training of independent professional wrestlers. The first independent promotions and schools designated under WWE ID were Reality of Wrestling (run by Booker T), Black and Brave Academy (run by Seth Rollins and Marek Brave), Nightmare Factory (run by Cody Rhodes), Elite Pro Wrestling Training Center (run by Mike Hollow and Scott Reed), and KnokX Pro Academy (run by Rikishi). On March 5, 2025, WWE launched the Evolve brand, a revival of the independent Evolve Wrestling promotion, as an NXT subsidiary brand which heavily features WWE NIL and ID prospects. In this scenario, Evolve serves as an early stage developmental brand, with the goal being for the wrestlers featured on the WWE Evolve program to move on to NXT, and eventually to the main roster on Raw or SmackDown.

== WWE developmental territories (1998–2012) ==
The following promotions were developmental territories of WWF/WWE between 1998 and 2012.

Promotion	Acronym	Year(s) affiliated with WWE	Location	Promoter(s)	Notable alumni
World Wrestling Alliance	WWA	1998–1999	Rockland, Massachusetts	Fred Sparta; Mike Sparta	Jeff Hardy, Matt Hardy, Kurt Angle, Edge, Christian, Andrew Martin
Power Pro Wrestling	PPW	1998–2001	Memphis, Tennessee	Randy Hales	Shawn Stasiak, Baldo, Erin O'Grady, Vic Grimes
IWA Puerto Rico	IWA-PR	1999–2001	Carolina, Puerto Rico	Víctor Quiñones	Steve Bradley, Russ McCullough
Ohio Valley Wrestling	OVW	1999–2008	Louisville, Kentucky	Danny Davis; Jim Cornette	Nick Dinsmore, Brock Lesnar, Batista, John Cena, Randy Orton, Shelton Benjamin
Memphis Championship Wrestling	MCW	2000–2001	Memphis, Tennessee	Terry Golden	American Dragon, Spanky, Lance Cade, Reckless Youth
Heartland Wrestling Association	HWA	2001–2002	Cincinnati, Ohio	Les Thatcher	Kaz Hayashi, Jamie Knoble, Jimmy Yang, Shannon Moore, Maven
Deep South Wrestling	DSW	2005–2007	McDonough, Georgia	Jody Hamilton	The Great Khali, Montel Vontavious Porter, Kenny Omega, Brett Majors, Brian Majors, Mike Mizanin
Ultimate Pro Wrestling	UPW	2006–2007	Santa Ana, California	Rick Bassman	Ezekiel Jackson
Florida Championship Wrestling	FCW	2007–2012	Tampa, Florida	Steve Keirn	Wade Barrett, AJ Lee, Bray Wyatt, Dean Ambrose, Seth Rollins, Roman Reigns

== WWE developmental brands (2012–present) ==
The following have served as the developmental brands of WWE since the launch of the in-house NXT system in 2012.

Brand	Year(s) active as a developmental brand	Location	Head(s) of creative	Notable alumni
NXT	2012–present (Note: While the NXT brand has been active since February 2010, it became an official WWE developmental brand in August 2012 after the dissolution of FCW.)	Orlando, Florida	Shawn Michaels	Charlotte Flair, Sasha Banks, Bayley, Chad Gable, Bianca Belair, Bron Breakker, Tiffany Stratton, Oba Femi
NXT UK	2016–2022	London, England	Jim Smallman	Tyler Bate, Pete Dunne, Rhea Ripley, Toni Storm, Walter, A-Kid
205 Live	2019–2022 (Note: While the 205 Live brand was first launched in November 2016, it became an NXT developmental subsidiary brand in October 2019.)	Orlando, Florida	Dewey Foley; Adam Pearce	Gentleman Jack Gallagher, Lio Rush, Humberto Carrillo, Angel Garza, Ari Sterling
Evolve	2025–present	Orlando, Florida	Gabe Sapolsky	Jackson Drake, Kali Armstrong, Ricky Smokes, Kendal Grey, Brad Baylor

== WWE Independent Development affiliates (2024–present) ==
The following wrestling schools have served as affiliates of the WWE Independent Development (ID) program since its launch in 2024.

School	Year(s) affiliated with WWE ID	Location	Head trainer(s)	Notable alumni
KnokX Pro Academy	2024–2025	Sun Valley, California	Rikishi	Jordan Oasis
Nightmare Factory	2024–present	McDonough, Georgia	Cody Rhodes; Q. T. Marshall; Glacier	Max Abrams
Reality of Wrestling	2024–present	Texas City, Texas	Booker T	Ice Williams
Black and Brave Academy	2024–present	Davenport, Iowa	Seth Rollins; Marek Brave	Nathan Frazer
Elite Pro Wrestling Training Center	2024–present	Concord, New Hampshire	Mike Hollow; Scott Reed	It's Gal
