= Nightmare Factory (professional wrestling) =

American professional wrestling promotion and school

- Logo for the Nightmare Factory used since 2020
- Founded: 2017
- Style: American professional wrestling
- Headquarters: 1380 S Zack Hinton Parkway; McDonough, Georgia, United States
- Founder: Michael Cuellari
- Owner(s): Michael Cuellari; Cody Rhodes; Raymond Lloyd
- Parent: Nightmare Factory Training, LLC
- Website: https://nightmarefactoryga.com

The Nightmare Factory, formerly the Power Factory, is a professional wrestling promotion and school located in McDonough, Georgia. The school is currently affiliated with WWE's Independent Development (ID) program, serving as an official developmental territory and school for the promotion. The school is additionally affiliated with All Elite Wrestling (AEW) and 1 Fall Wrestling (1FW), through school founder and co-owner Michael Cuellari's relationships with AEW and 1FW.

== History ==
The school was founded as the Power Factory in 2017 and was originally headquartered in Buford, Georgia, before moving to Norcross, Georgia and rebranding as the Nightmare Factory in 2020. As the Nightmare Factory, the school developed a relationship with Tony Khan's All Elite Wrestling (AEW) promotion. A November 2020 PWInsider article described the Nightmare Factory as AEW's official "training center".

During late March 2020, AEW taped their weekly shows Dynamite and Dark at the Nightmare Factory without an audience due to the COVID-19 pandemic.

On July 30, 2020, the Nightmare Factory announced that they would be opening developmental camps beginning September 21. On December 14, the Nightmare Factory taped their first student showcase event which featured various wrestlers from the first Nightmare Factory class. The event aired on YouTube on January 4, 2021.

On October 29, 2024, WWE launched their Independent Development (ID) program which established a path for independent wrestlers to a potential career with WWE. The Nightmare Factory was also announced as a WWE ID-affiliated wrestling school along with Reality of Wrestling owned by Booker T, Black and Brave Wrestling Academy owned by Seth Rollins, Marek Brave, and Matt Mayday, and the KnokX Pro Wrestling Academy owned by Rikishi, among other schools.

== Championships ==
Championship	Current Champion(s)	Date won	Days held	Event	Location
Nightmare Factory Heavyweight Championship	Max Abrams	June 13, 2025	448+	LIVE from The Nightmare Factory	Atlanta, Georgia
Nightmare Factory Women's Championship	Remi Reada	June 26, 2026	70+	Nightmare Factory Presents ID Showcase	Atlanta, Georgia
