= Jey Uso =

American professional wrestler (born 1985)

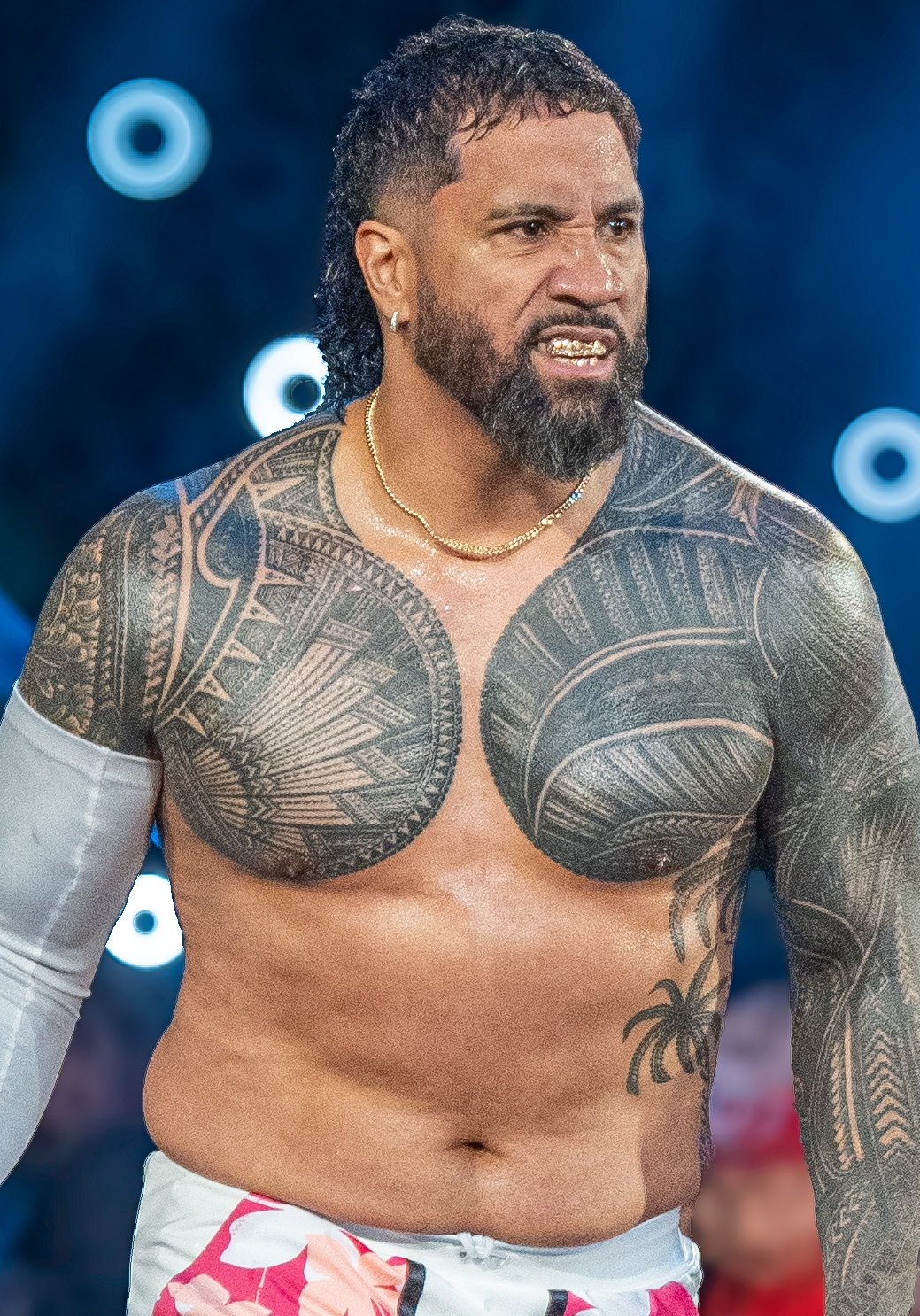
- Uso in 2025

Personal information
- Born: Joshua Samuel Fatu; August 22, 1985 (age 41) San Francisco, California, U.S.
- Education: University of West Alabama
- Spouse: Takecia Travis (m. 2014, separated)
- Children: 2
- Father: Rikishi
- Family: Anoaʻi

Professional wrestling career
- Ring name(s): Jey Uso; Josh Fatu; Joshua Fatu; Jules Uso
- Billed height: 6 ft 2 in (188 cm)
- Billed weight: 242 lb (110 kg)
- Billed from: San Francisco, California
- Trained by: Rikishi; Booker T Wild Samoan Training Center; Florida Championship Wrestling
- Debut: June 8, 2007

Joshua Samuel Fatu (born August 22, 1985), better known by the ring name Jey Uso, is an American professional wrestler. He is signed to WWE, where he performs on the Raw brand and is one-half of The Usos alongside his brother Jimmy as members of The Bloodline stable. He is also a member of the Anoaʻi family of professional wrestlers.

Trained since childhood by his father, WWE Hall of Famer Rikishi, Jey debuted in 2008, before joining WWE's then-developmental territory Florida Championship Wrestling (FCW) in 2010, and wrestled as Jules Uso alongside his twin brother, Jimmy, as The Usos, where they became FCW Florida Tag Team Champions. They were moved to the main roster later that year.

During his time as part of The Usos, Jey holds the record for the longest male tag team championship reign in WWE history at 622 days, which was accomplished in their fifth reign with the WWE SmackDown Tag Team Championship. They are overall nine-time tag team champions in WWE, capturing the WWE Raw Tag Team Championship four times and winning the Slammy Award for Tag Team of the Year in both 2014 and 2015. In 2017, they won the SmackDown Tag Team Championship on three occasions, followed by a fourth reign in 2019 and a fifth reign in 2021. They are the first team to win both the Raw and SmackDown Tag Team Championships and the first team to hold them simultaneously as the Undisputed WWE Tag Team Championship. The two headlined multiple pay-per-views, including WrestleMania 39 - Night 1.

As a singles professional wrestler, Jey won the 2020 Feud of the Year category for his feud with Roman Reigns by the CBS Sports as well as the 2021 André the Giant Memorial Battle Royal. He would later win the Undisputed WWE Tag Team Championship with Cody Rhodes, marking his fourth reign with the Raw Tag Team Championship and sixth reign with the SmackDown Tag Team Championship. In September 2024, he won the Intercontinental Championship, the first singles title of his career. In February 2025, Uso won the Men's Royal Rumble, earning him a world championship match at WrestleMania 41, where he defeated Gunther for the World Heavyweight Championship, marking the first world title of his career.

== Early life ==
Joshua Samuel Fatu was born in San Francisco, California on August 22, 1985, nine minutes after his twin brother Jonathan, to parents Talisua Fuavai and professional wrestler Solofa Fatu Jr. He is of Samoan descent and is a member of the Anoaʻi family. He attended Escambia High School with his twin brother in Pensacola, Florida, where he played competitive football. He continued his football career at University of West Alabama from 2003 to 2005, where he played linebacker.

Prior to the 2005 season, UWA head football coach Sam McCorkle cited in a Tuscaloosa News article that Fatu would be one of the players to watch. McCorkle hoped Josh Fatu, who was previously sat out for academic reasons, would help provide shots on defense. The season did not go as Fatu hoped it would.

Realizing his football career was not heading down a desirable path, Fatu and his brother Jonathan decided to join their father Rikishi and uncle, Umaga in the wrestling industry.

== Professional wrestling career ==
=== Early career (2007–2009) ===
As Joshua Fatu, he made his professional wrestling debut for World Xtreme Wrestling (WXW) alongside his brother Jonathan Fatu, as a tag team called The Fatu Twins in Milton, Florida, on June 8, 2007. On December 12, 2008, Joshua made his appearance for National Wrestling Alliance (NWA) at NWA Prime Time event in Columbus, Georgia, as Josh Fatu. He was a member of a tag team called The Samoan Soldiers with his brother Jonathan. In 2009, he and his brother wrestled twice as a tag team for Xtreme Championship Wrestling (XCW) in Decature and North Richland Hills, Texas.

=== World Wrestling Entertainment / WWE ===
==== Florida Championship Wrestling (2010) ====
Joshua made his debut as Jules Uso, joining a tag team with his brother, called the Uso Brothers starting in 2010 by defeating The Rotundo Brothers (Duke and Bo) on January 14. On February 18, The Rotundo Brothers teamed up with Wes Brisco to defeat The Usos and Donny Marlow. They continued their association with Marlow at the television tapings on February 25, when he accompanied them to ringside for a victory against Titus O'Neil and Big E Langston. The following month, they were given a manager, Sarona Snuka. On March 13, The Usos defeated The Fortunate Sons (Joe Hennig and Brett DiBiase) to win the FCW Florida Tag Team Championship. They made their first successful title defense at the March 18 television tapings against The Dudebusters (Trent Baretta and Caylen Croft). They went on to successfully defend the championship against Percy Watson and Darren Young, Hunico and Tito Nieves, Skip Sheffield and Darren Young, and The Dudebusters, who they defeated by disqualification when Tamina pulled the referee out of the ring to stop him from counting the pinfall. On June 3, The Usos lost the Florida Tag Team Championship to "Los Aviadores" (Hunico and Dos Equis).

==== The early beginnings as The Usos (2010–2016) ====
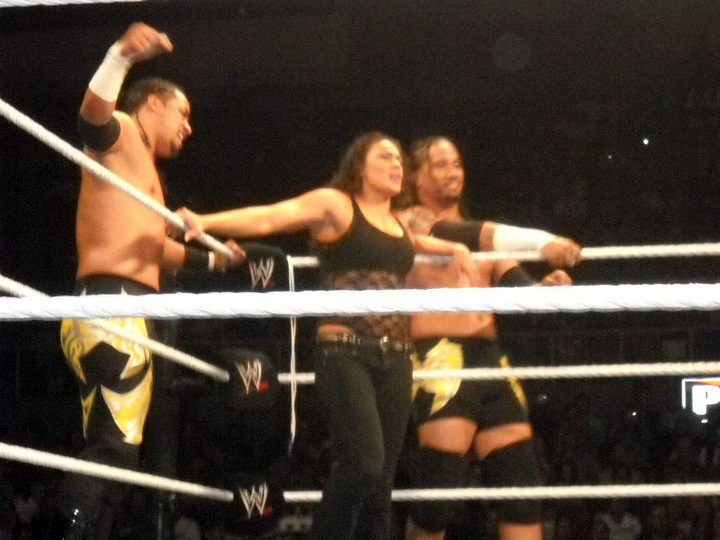
The Usos with Tamina in September 2010

On the May 24, 2010, episode of Raw, The Usos (with Jules now wrestling as Jey Uso) and Tamina made their debut as heels by attacking the Unified WWE Tag Team Champions, The Hart Dynasty (Tyson Kidd, David Hart Smith, and Natalya). The following week, Raw General Manager Bret Hart stated that he had signed them to contracts. That night, the trio cut a promo, stating that they were looking for respect for their families. They were interrupted and attacked by The Hart Dynasty, who were seeking revenge for the surprise attack the previous week. The Usos attempted to attack The Hart Dynasty again on the June 7 episode of Raw, but The Harts gained the upper hand. The Usos made their in-ring debut for the brand on the June 17 episode of Superstars, defeating Goldust and Mark Henry. Three days later, they made their pay-per-view debut by losing to The Hart Dynasty in a six-person mixed tag team match at Fatal 4-Way. The Usos were scheduled to face The Hart Dynasty on the June 28 episode of Raw, but the match never started as The Usos instead attacked The Harts when they were entering the ring. The Usos defeated The Hart Dynasty for the first time in a six-person mixed tag team match on the July 12 episode of Raw when Jey pinned Smith. The Usos challenged The Harts for the Unified Tag Team Championship at Money in the Bank on July 18, but were unsuccessful. On the July 26 episode of Raw, Jey Uso faced Randy Orton in his first singles match on the brand in a losing effort. They received another shot for the Tag Team Championship on September 19 at Night of Champions in a Tag Team Turmoil match, where they eliminated both The Hart Dynasty and the team of Vladimir Kozlov and Santino Marella before being eliminated by Mark Henry and Evan Bourne. On the December 6 episode of Raw, The Usos were in a fatal four-way tag match and were eliminated, but Tamina stayed in the corner of Marella and Kozlov upon their winning of the WWE Tag Team Championship; as a result, she turned face and left The Usos.

On April 26, 2011, both Usos were drafted to the SmackDown brand as part of the 2011 Supplemental Draft. On the June 2 episode of Superstars, The Usos turned face when they competed against The Corre (Justin Gabriel and Heath Slater) in a losing effort. During this time, The Usos began performing the Siva Tau, a traditional Samoan war dance, as part of their ring entrance, using the dance to display their strength and energize themselves; they performed this entrance until their heel turn in 2016. On the July 29 episode of SmackDown, The Usos challenged David Otunga and Michael McGillicutty for the WWE Tag Team Titles, but were defeated.

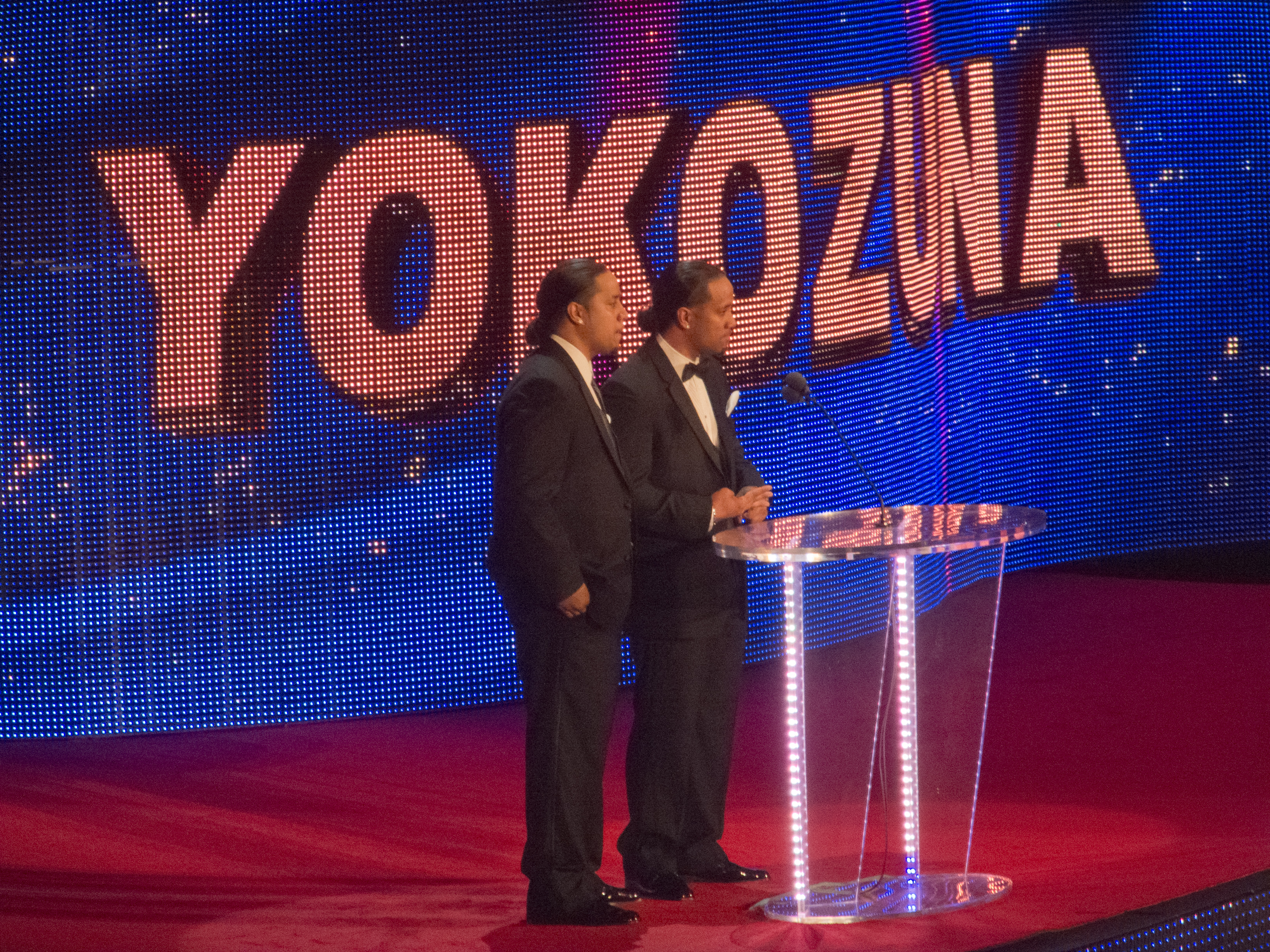
The Usos at the 2012 WWE Hall of Fame ceremony inducting their cousin Yokozuna

The Usos then began appearing on the fifth season of NXT in September 2011, by delivering post-match attacks on the team of Darren Young and JTG. The Usos then went on to defeat Young and JTG on the September 27 episode of NXT Redemption. However, just like how The Usos debuted on NXT, they were attacked after their win by another debuting tag team, Curt Hawkins and Tyler Reks, and The Usos lost to Hawkins and Reks the next week. In the following months and into 2012, The Usos exchanged wins with Hawkins and Reks on NXT, while continually losing to Primo and Epico on SmackDown. They also feuded with JTG, who had become Tamina's boyfriend. In March 2012, The Usos began a feud with Darren Young and Titus O'Neil, after they mocked The Usos' pre-match Siva Tau. Although The Usos beat Young and O'Neil in tag team matches, they were continually defeated in singles matches. The Usos then started a feud with The Ascension (Conor O'Brian and Kenneth Cameron) on the August 15 episode of NXT, with a match between the two tag teams ending in the Ascension being disqualified; the Ascension then conducted a post-match attack on The Usos. On the September 5 episode of NXT, the Ascension defeated The Usos. The Usos then teamed with Richie Steamboat to lose to The Ascension and Kassius Ohno on the October 17 episode of NXT. The Usos' feud with the Ascension was cut short when Cameron was released from WWE.

On April 1 at WrestleMania XXVIII, The Usos unsuccessfully challenged for the WWE Tag Team Championship in a triple threat dark match against champions Primo and Epico and Tyson Kidd and Justin Gabriel when the defending champions retained their titles. At No Way Out on June 17, The Usos faced Primo and Epico, Justin Gabriel and Tyson Kidd, and The Prime Time Players in a Fatal-4-Way tag team match to determine the Number 1 contenders for the WWE Tag Team Champions and were unsuccessful. On the July 16 episode of Raw, The Usos made an appearance dancing with their father, Rikishi, after Rikishi made a "Blast from the Past" return defeating Heath Slater. On the September 7 episode of SmackDown, The Usos were unsuccessful in winning a triple threat tag team match for number one contendership for the WWE Tag Team titles against The Prime Time Players, and Primo and Epico.

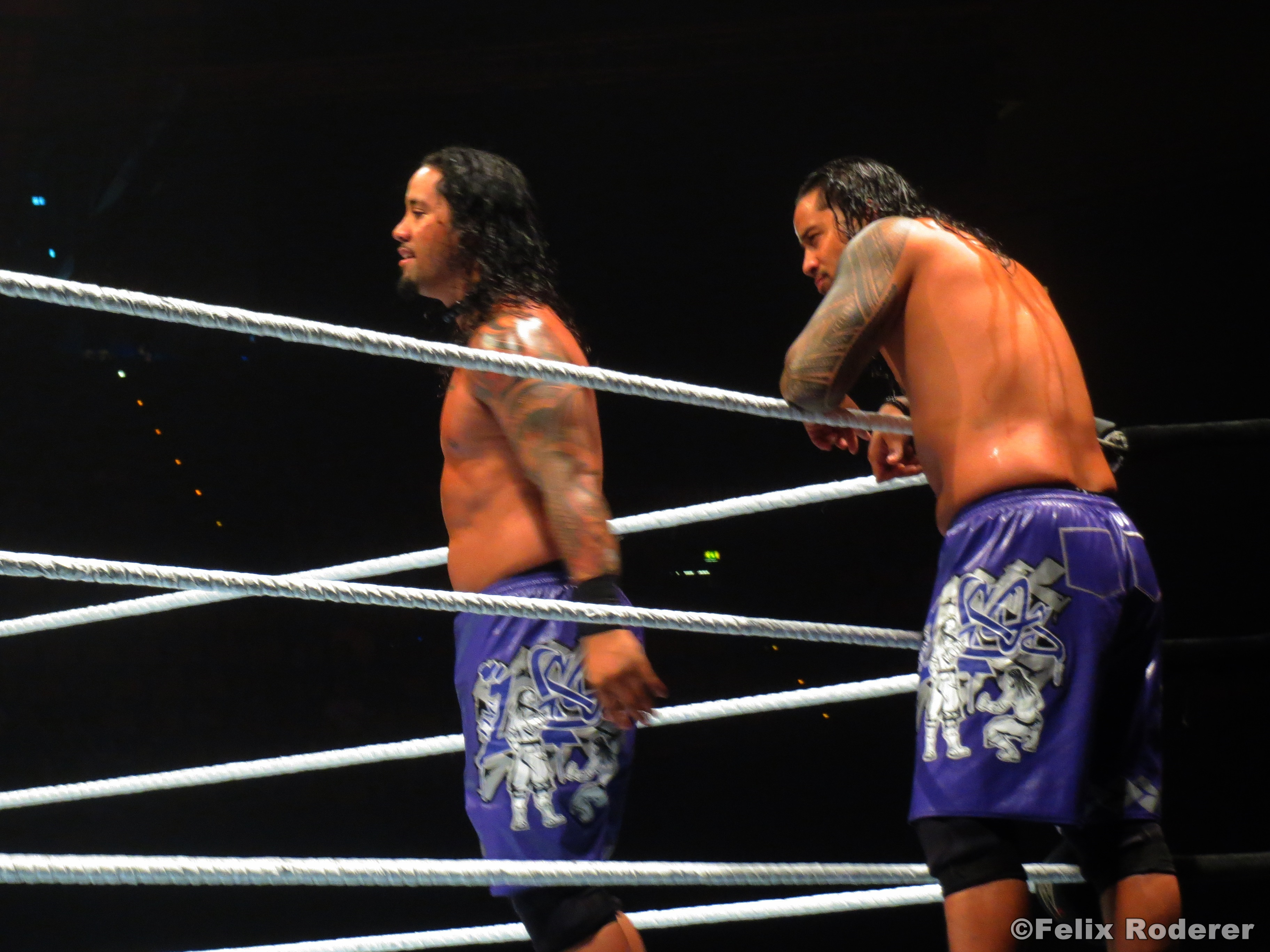
The Usos in November 2013

On the June 3 episode of Raw, The Usos began to use face paint similar to their deceased uncle Eddie Fatu, also known as Umaga, as a means of further highlighting their Samoan culture. At Money in the Bank on July 14, The Usos challenged The Shield (Seth Rollins and Roman Reigns) for the titles in a losing effort. On October 27, they participated in a triple-threat tag team match against the team of Cody Rhodes and Goldust and The Shield at Hell in a Cell, but lost. The Usos were involved in the traditional Survivor Series elimination match at Survivor Series on November 24, teaming with Rey Mysterio, Cody Rhodes and Goldust in a losing effort against The Real Americans and The Shield.

At the beginning of 2014, The Usos would go on a winning streak and began to demand a Tag Team Championship match from New Age Outlaws. They received their title shot at Elimination Chamber on February 23, but were once again unsuccessful. On the March 3 episode of Raw, The Usos defeated the Outlaws to win the titles. At the WrestleMania XXX pre-show on April 6, The Usos successfully defended their titles in a fatal four-way elimination match against Ryback and Curtis Axel, The Real Americans, and Los Matadores. The Usos then feuded with The Wyatt Family, successfully retaining the championships against Harper and Rowan on June 29 at Money in the Bank and in a two-out-of-three falls match at Battleground on July 20. The Usos dropped the titles to Goldust and Stardust at Night of Champions on September 21, ending their reign at 202 days.

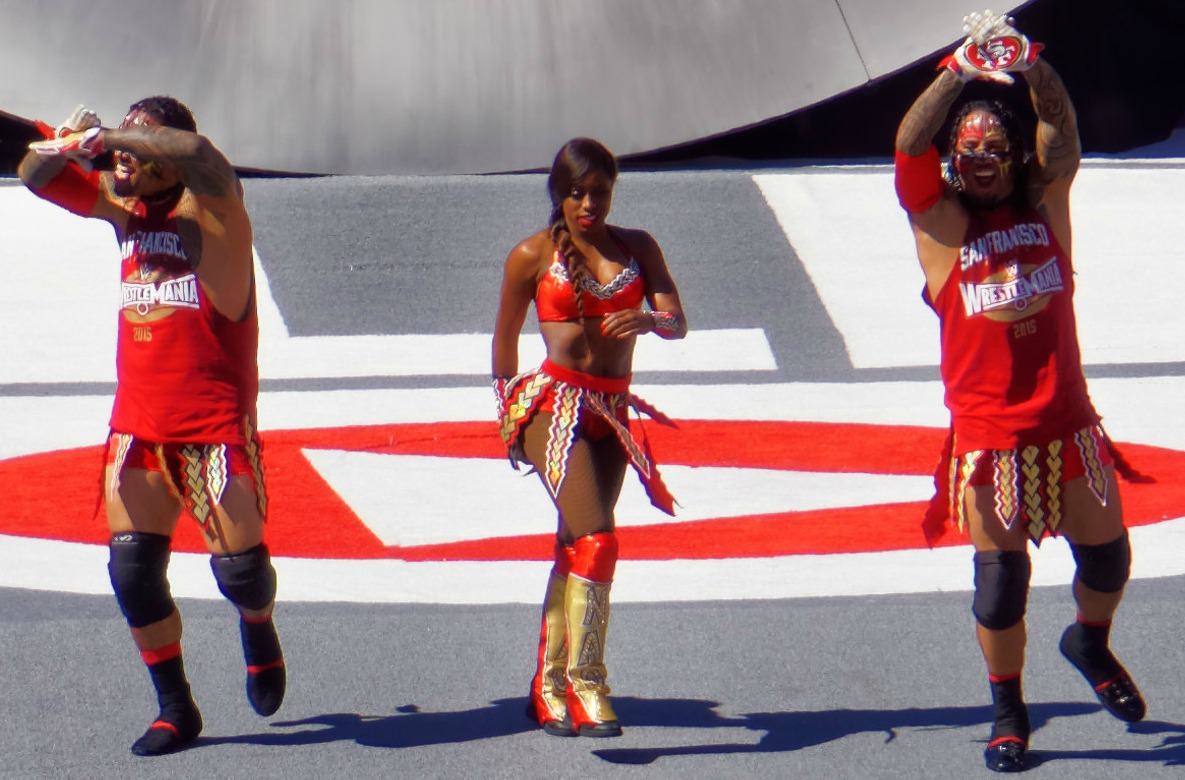
The Usos with Naomi making their entrance to the ring at the WrestleMania 31 pre-show in March 2015

On the December 29 episode of Raw, The Usos recaptured the titles from The Miz and Damien Mizdow after feuding with them over Naomi's entertainment opportunities. However, they lost the titles at Fastlane on February 22 against Tyson Kidd and Cesaro. In a rematch the next night on Raw, The Usos failed to regain the titles due to Natalya interfering for a disqualification victory. At the March 9 SmackDown tapings, Jey Uso suffered a legitimate shoulder injury. At the WrestleMania 31 pre-show on March 29, they competed in a fatal-four-way tag team match, which they lost and Jey further injured his shoulder.

After Jey suffered an anterior shoulder dislocation on the left arm, he remained off WWE television for about six months. He returned on the November 2 episode of Raw alongside his brother Jimmy as a surprise return to team up with their cousin Roman Reigns, Dean Ambrose and Ryback against Seth Rollins, Kevin Owens and The New Day in a Survivor Series elimination tag team match, The Usos along with Reigns, Ambrose and Ryback were victorious in the match. On the November 30 episode of Raw, The Usos competed in a tag team #1 contenders match against Lucha Dragons, which ended in a double disqualification when The New Day attacked both teams. Later that night, Stephanie McMahon told The Usos that they would be inserted to the tag team championship match at the TLC pay-per-view if Roman Reigns defeated Sheamus during the main event of the show in 5 minutes and 15 seconds, which he won by disqualification. At TLC on December 13, The Usos competed in a losing effort. The Usos won a Slammy Award on the December 21 episode of Raw for "Tag team of the year".

At the Royal Rumble on January 24, 2016, The Usos unsuccessfully challenged The New Day for the WWE Tag Team Championship. In February, The Usos entered a feud with the Dudley Boyz after they put The Usos through tables after defeating The New Day and Mark Henry in an 8-man tag team tables match. On April 3, at the WrestleMania 32 kickoff show, The Usos defeated The Dudley Boyz, but the next night on Raw, they were defeated by the Dudleys in a tables match. On the April 11 episode of Raw, The Usos defeated The Social Outcasts in the first round of a tag team tournament. Following the match, they were attacked by Luke Gallows and Karl Anderson. The following week on Raw, The Usos lost to The Vaudevillains in the semi-final round. On the May 2 episode of Raw, The Usos and Roman Reigns lost to AJ Styles, Gallows and Anderson in a six-man tag team match after Styles pinned Jey. At Extreme Rules on May 22, The Usos lost to Gallows and Anderson in a Texas Tornado match, but helped Reigns retain his title in the main event.

==== Tag team dominance (2016–2020) ====
On July 19, during the 2016 WWE draft, The Usos were drafted to SmackDown working on both the Battleground and SummerSlam pre-shows. Then, they entered an 8 tag team tournament to determine the inaugural holders of the SmackDown Tag Team Championship. On the September 6 episode of SmackDown, The Usos turned heel for the first time since 2011 when they attacked American Alpha after losing to them in 28 seconds in the semi-finals. At Backlash on September 11, The Usos defeated the Hype Bros before facing Heath Slater and Rhyno in the tournament finals, where they were defeated. On October 9, The Usos faced the new champions at No Mercy, but were again defeated. As part of their heel turn, they began a street-like, thuggish gimmick. The Usos participated in a 5-on-5 Survivor Series Tag Team Elimination match at Survivor Series on November 20, where they lost to Cesaro and Sheamus of Team Raw. The Usos would reignite their feud with American Alpha following Elimination Chamber on February 12, after they attacked American Alpha.

On the March 21, 2017, episode of SmackDown, The Usos defeated American Alpha to win the SmackDown Tag Team Championship, becoming the first team to have won both the Raw (formerly WWE Tag Team Championship) and SmackDown Tag Team Championship. On the April 11 episode of SmackDown Live, The Usos were successful in their first title defense by defeating American Alpha in a rematch, ending the feud. They retained the titles at Backlash on May 21 against Breezango (Tyler Breeze and Fandango) and Money in the Bank on June 18 against The New Day, but lost them at Battleground on June 23 to The New Day, ending their 124-day reign. On August 20 at the SummerSlam pre-show, The Usos defeated The New Day to recapture the titles. Their reign ended on the September 12 episode of SmackDown Live after they lost to The New Day in a Sin City Street Fight, but regained the titles on October 8 at Hell in a Cell. Two days later on SmackDown Live, The Usos claimed that they had respect for The New Day, turning into fan favorites again.

At Survivor Series on November 19, they defeated Raw Tag Team Champions Cesaro and Sheamus in an interbrand Champion vs Champion match. At Clash of Champions on December 17, The Usos retained the titles in a fatal four-way tag team match against Chad Gable and Shelton Benjamin, The New Day (Big E and Kofi Kingston) and Rusev and Aiden English. At Royal Rumble on January 28, 2018, The Usos retained the titles against Gable and Benjamin in a two out of three falls match, winning 2–0. They would renew their rivalry with the New Day, culminating in a title match at Fastlane on March 11, which would end in a no-contest due to interference from The Bludgeon Brothers. At WrestleMania 34 on April 8, The Usos wrestled on the main card of WrestleMania for the first time, where they defended the titles against The New Day and The Bludgeon Brothers in a triple threat tag team match. The Usos dropped the belts to The Bludgeon Brothers after Harper pinned Kofi Kingston, ending their reign at 182 days and setting a record for the longest SmackDown Tag Team Championship reign. On the SmackDown after WrestleMania, The Usos would defeat the New Day to earn a rematch against the Bludgeon Brothers for the WWE SmackDown Tag Team Championship at the Greatest Royal Rumble. At the event on April 27, The Usos were defeated when Rowan pinned Jey Uso.

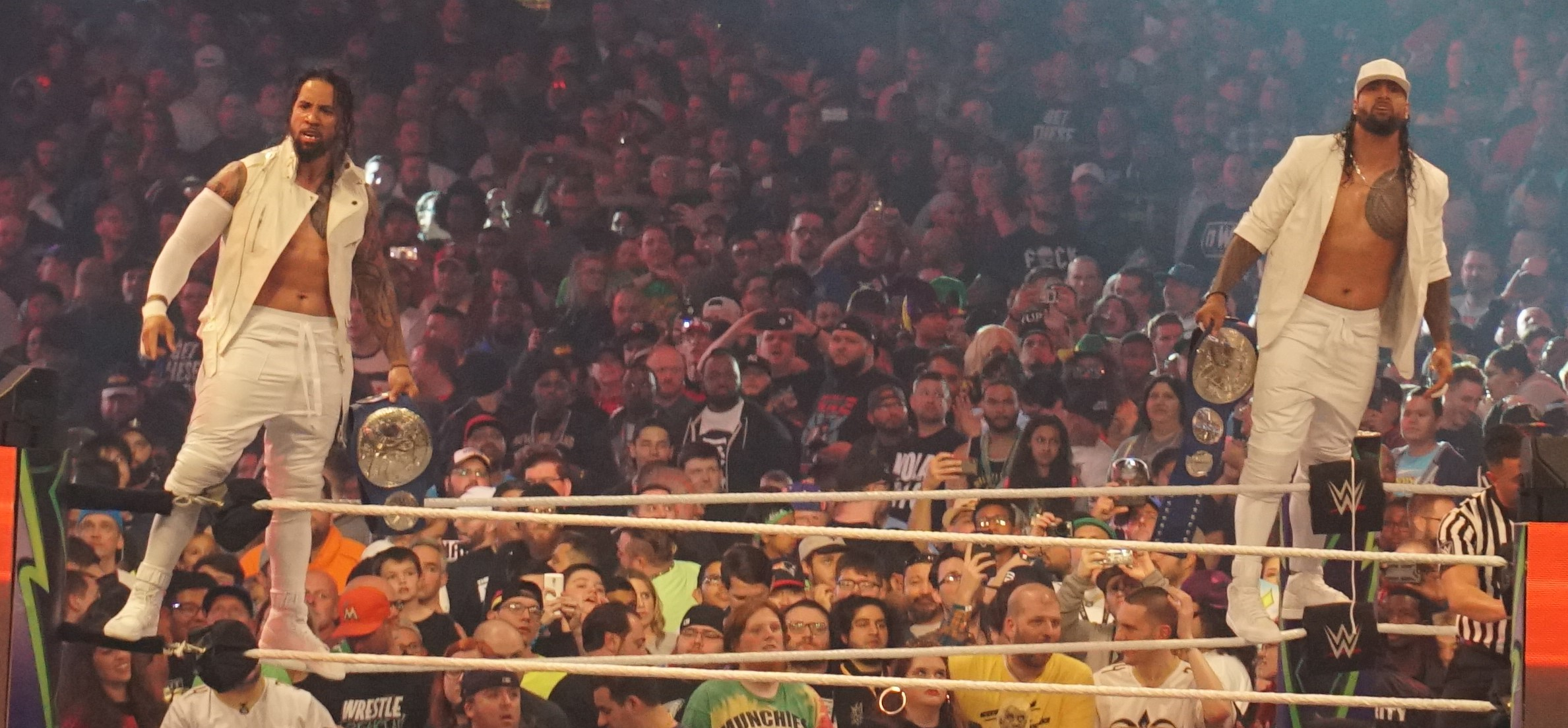
The Usos as SmackDown Tag Team Champions at WrestleMania 34

On the May 22 episode of SmackDown, The Usos attempted to earn another title match at Money in the Bank, but were defeated by Luke Gallows and Karl Anderson. Following the loss, The Usos began failing to earn numerous title opportunities, including a tag team match against a returning Team Hell No (Daniel Bryan and Kane) on the July 3 episode of SmackDown and losing in the first round of a number one contender's tournament to The Bar (Cesaro and Sheamus) on the July 31 episode of SmackDown. After months of treading in the division, The Usos began to build momentum, starting with Survivor Series on November 18, where they, as Team SmackDown's captains, emerged from the 10-on-10 Survivor Series match as the sole survivors, giving SmackDown their only win over Raw. They would go on to challenge The Bar for the SmackDown Tag Team Championship in a triple threat match, which also included the New Day at TLC on December 16, but failed to capture the titles.

On the January 29, 2019, episode of SmackDown, they defeated The Bar, The New Day and new SmackDown tag team Heavy Machinery (Otis and Tucker) to get a SmackDown Tag Team Championship match at Elimination Chamber on February 17, where they defeated Shane McMahon and The Miz to win the titles for a record fourth time. On the March 26 episode of SmackDown, The Usos were a part of a tag team gauntlet match in which they forfeited to former longtime rivals the New Day as a show of respect and to help Kofi Kingston earn a WWE Championship match at WrestleMania. As a storyline punishment for their deed, they were scheduled to defend the titles against The Bar, Aleister Black and Ricochet, and Shinsuke Nakamura and Rusev in a Fatal 4-Way at WrestleMania 35 on April 7, which they won. Two days later on SmackDown, The Usos lost the titles to Hardy Boyz.

As part of the 2019 WWE Superstar Shake-up, The Usos were drafted to the Raw brand. They entered a feud with The Revival (Dash Wilder and Scott Dawson) on Raw, while also entering a feud with Daniel Bryan and Rowan on SmackDown, thanks to WWE's new Wild Card Rule. On the May 7 episode of SmackDown Live, they failed to regain the SmackDown Tag Team Championship from Bryan and Rowan. At Money in the Bank on May 19, they defeated Bryan and Rowan in a non-title match. They continued their feud with The Revival, where the two teams traded victories with one another. On the June 10 episode of Raw, both The Usos and The Revival competed in a triple threat match for the Raw Tag Team Championship against champions Curt Hawkins and Zack Ryder, which The Revival won. On July 14 at Extreme Rules, The Usos challenged The Revival for the titles, where they were unsuccessful. Following Jimmy's arrest for DUI, the duo would be off television for the remainder of the calendar year.

On the January 3, 2020, episode of SmackDown, The Usos made a surprise return once again as part of the SmackDown brand, aiding Roman Reigns from an attack by King Corbin and Dolph Ziggler. The Usos then challenged for the SmackDown Tag Team Championship at Elimination Chamber on March 8 and WrestleMania 36 on April 4, where they were unsuccessful again. During the match at WrestleMania, Jimmy suffered a legitimate knee injury, putting him out of in-ring action indefinitely.

==== The Bloodline (2020–2023) ====
On the September 4 episode of SmackDown, after Big E was attacked and injured in a storyline, Uso took Big E's place in a fatal 4-way match against Matt Riddle, King Corbin, and Sheamus where the winner would earn a Universal Championship match at Clash of Champions against Roman Reigns, who turned heel recently. He won by pinning Riddle to earn the first singles championship opportunity of his career. On September 27, he was defeated at Clash of Champions when Jimmy appeared and threw in a towel on Jey's behalf. Uso then received a rematch on October 25 at Hell in a Cell in an "I Quit" Hell in a Cell match, but lost again. After Hell in a Cell, he aligned with Roman Reigns, thus turning heel in the process. On the April 9, 2021, special WrestleMania edition of SmackDown, he won the Andre the Giant Memorial Battle Royal. This marked Uso's first major singles accolade in WWE.

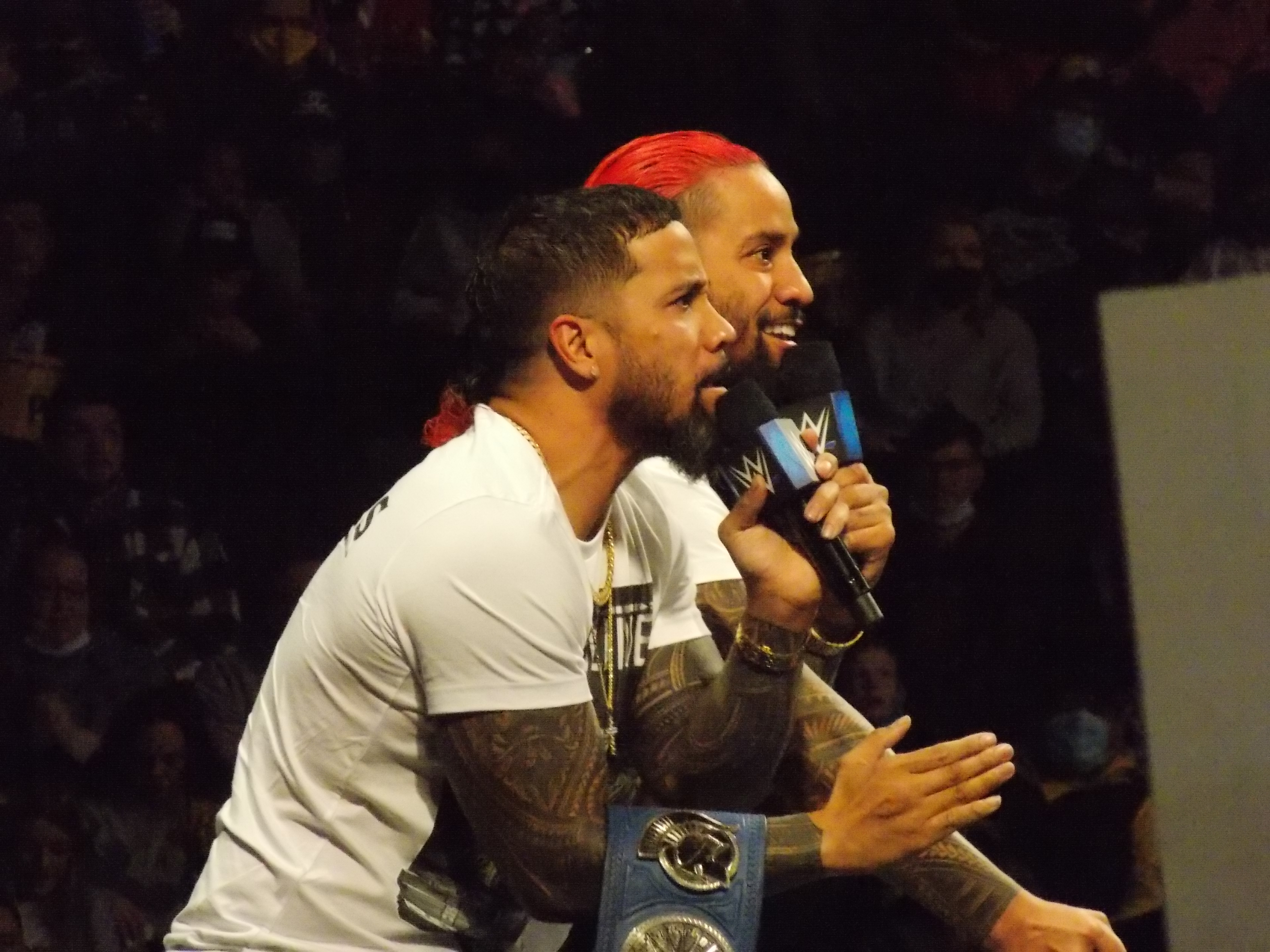
The Usos in 2022

After Jimmy returned from injury on the May 7 episode of SmackDown, there was an initial strife between The Usos and Reigns before they all reconciled and formed a faction, with Jimmy turning heel in the process. During the Money in the Bank Kickoff pre-show on July 18, The Usos were successful in capturing their fifth SmackDown Tag Team Championship from the Mysterios (composed of Rey and Dominik Mysterio). At SummerSlam on August 21, The Usos would defeat The Mysterios in a rematch to retain the titles.

On January 16, 2022, they broke their previous record of 185 days as longest reigning SmackDown Tag Team Champions. At Night 1 of WrestleMania 38 on April 2, The Usos defeated Shinsuke Nakamura and Rick Boogs to retain their championships. At WrestleMania Backlash on May 8, The Usos and Reigns defeated RK-Bro (Randy Orton and Riddle) and Drew McIntyre in a six-man tag team match. On the May 20 episode of SmackDown, they, with outside interference from Reigns, defeated RK-Bro to win the Raw Tag Team Championship, becoming the Undisputed WWE Tag Team Champions. This gave The Usos their third reign as Raw Tag Team Champions (and first reign with the title since 2014) and made them the first team to hold the Raw and SmackDown titles simultaneously. At Money in the Bank on July 2, The Usos retained their undisputed titles against Street Profits in controversial fashion, with The Usos winning by pinfall despite Montez Ford's shoulder being off the mat. A rematch between the teams was scheduled for SummerSlam with a special guest referee, later revealed to be Jeff Jarrett.

On July 18, The Usos surpassed the 365-day mark as SmackDown Tag Team Champions, becoming the first team to hold the titles for a continuous reign of one full year. At SummerSlam on July 30, The Usos successfully retained against The Street Profits. At Crown Jewel on November 5, The Usos successfully retained the titles against The Brawling Brutes (Butch and Ridge Holland). On the November 11 episode of SmackDown, they retained their championships against The New Day (Kofi Kingston and Xavier Woods), thus ensuring that they would become the longest reigning male tag team champions on WWE's main roster, a record previously set by The New Day at 483 days. On November 14, 2022, The Usos officially broke The New Day's record for main roster tag team championships, and then on November 28, they broke Gallus' record of 497 days with the NXT UK Tag Team Championship to become the longest reigning male tag team champions in WWE history, regardless of championship or roster status. At Survivor Series: WarGames on November 26, The Bloodline (The Usos, Roman Reigns, Solo Sikoa and Sami Zayn) defeated The Brawling Brutes, Drew McIntyre and Kevin Owens in a WarGames match.

Tensions between The Usos and Sami Zayn resurfaced in subsequent weeks. After Reigns retained the Undisputed WWE Universal Championship at the Royal Rumble against Kevin Owens on January 28, 2023, The Usos proceeded to beat down Owens and handcuff him to the ring ropes. After refusing to hit Owens, Zayn then hit Reigns with a steel chair, turning face. Jimmy, Sikoa and Reigns attacked Zayn whilst Jey looked on and eventually left the ring in disgust. After the event, Uso declared on Instagram that "he's out" and did not appear on the following episode of SmackDown. He would show up on the February 10 episode of SmackDown to retain the SmackDown Tag Team Championship with Jimmy against Braun Strowman and Ricochet. Before the episode ended, Reigns, through Heyman, informed The Usos to stay at home for the following week's episode of SmackDown and Elimination Chamber in Canada.

On the March 6 episode of Raw, Uso showed up in the crowd during Jimmy's match against Zayn, which Jimmy lost. Following the match, he hugged Zayn and then delivered a Superkick to the latter, affirming his allegiance to The Bloodline. The Usos and Sikoa then attacked Zayn before Cody Rhodes ran out to save Zayn. On the March 20 episode of Raw, a reunited Owens and Zayn challenged The Usos for the Undisputed WWE Tag Team Championship at WrestleMania 39, which The Usos accepted. At Night 1 of WrestleMania on April 1, The Usos main evented WrestleMania for the first time in their careers, where they lost the titles to Owens and Zayn, thus ending their Raw reign at 316 days and their record SmackDown reign at 622 days. This match also marked the first time a tag team match main evented WrestleMania since its inaugural show. Following their loss, Reigns started ignoring them and began depending more on Sikoa instead, with Reigns inserting himself and Sikoa into a title match at Night of Champions. They failed to capture the Undisputed WWE Tag Team Championships in their rematch against Owens and Zayn on the April 28 episode of SmackDown.

==== Singles competition (2023–2025) ====
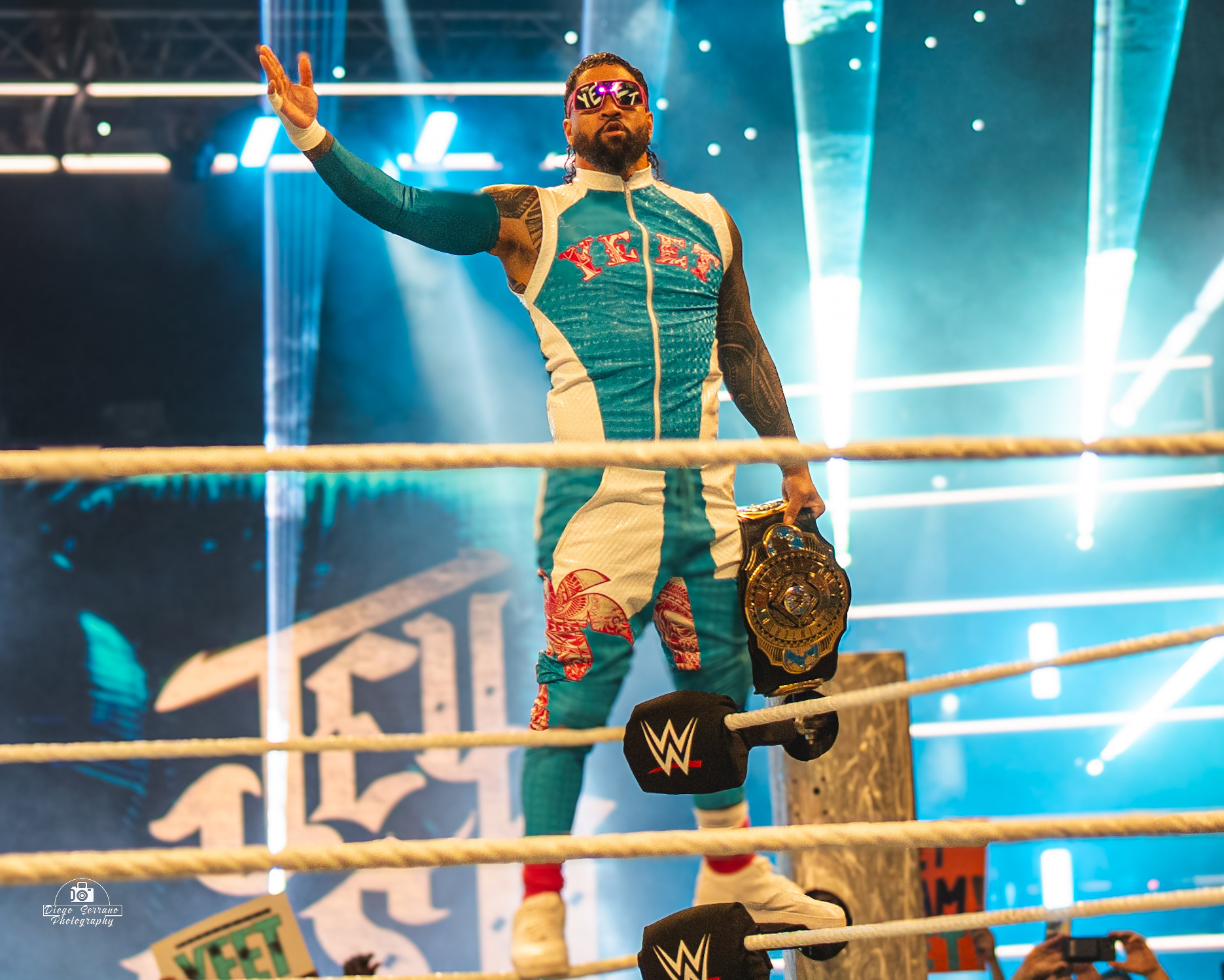
Jey Uso as WWE Intercontinental Champion in 2024

At Night of Champions on May 27, Jimmy turned face after he and Jey cost Reigns and Sikoa the match for the Undisputed WWE Tag Team Championships, with Jimmy superkicking Reigns for mistreating them. Jimmy was officially excommunicated from The Bloodline for his actions at Night of Champions on the June 2 episode of SmackDown during Reigns' 1,000 days Universal Champion celebration. On the June 16 episode of SmackDown, Jey sided with Jimmy and left The Bloodline by kicking Reigns, turning face for the first time since 2020. The Usos then superkicked both Sikoa and Reigns. On July 1 at Money in the Bank, The Usos defeated Reigns and Sikoa in a "Bloodline Civil War" tag team match after Jey pinned Reigns, giving him his first direct pinfall loss since December 2019 at TLC: Tables, Ladders & Chairs.

On August 5 at SummerSlam, Uso faced Reigns for the Undisputed WWE Universal Championship in a Tribal Combat match. Uso attempted to pin Reigns during the closing moments of the match, but Jimmy appeared to have turned on Jey by pulling him out of the ring and superkicked him, allowing Reigns to win. Uso returned at Payback on September 2, appearing on The Grayson Waller Effect with Cody Rhodes announcing that he would be switching brands from SmackDown to Raw.

At Fastlane on October 7, Uso and Rhodes defeated Bálor and Priest to win the Undisputed WWE Tag Team Championship, but lost it 9 days later. At Survivor Series: WarGames, Uso, Rhodes, Zayn, Seth "Freakin" Rollins and the returning Randy Orton defeated McIntyre and The Judgment Day (Priest, Bálor, Mysterio, and JD McDonagh) in a WarGames match.

At Night 1 of WrestleMania XL on April 6, Uso defeated his brother Jimmy via pinfall. The following night, Uso interfered in the main event between Reigns and Cody Rhodes, attacking Jimmy and spearing him through a table at the entrance ramp. The next night on Raw, Uso won a fatal four-way match to become the number one contender for the World Heavyweight Championship for Backlash France thanks to CM Punk. At the event on May 4, he failed to win the title from Priest after interference from JD McDonagh and Finn Bálor. Two nights later on Raw, he replaced an injured Drew McIntyre in the King of the Ring tournament, defeating Finn Bálor in the first round, and Ilja Dragunov to advance to the semifinals of the tournament, where he lost to Gunther.

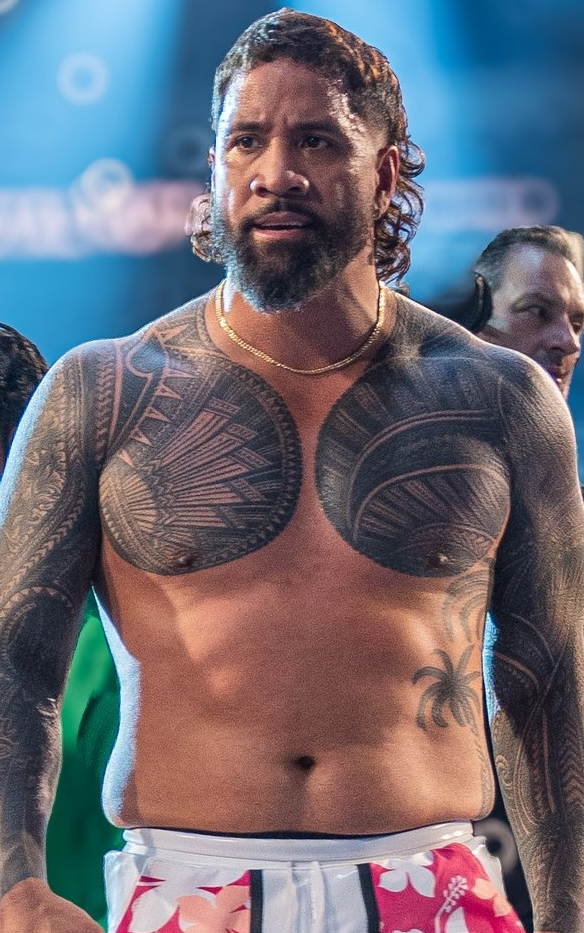
Jey Uso won the Royal Rumble match at the eponymous event on February 1, 2025.

On the September 23 episode of Raw, Uso defeated Bron Breakker to win his first singles title, the Intercontinental Championship, but lost it back to Breakker on the October 21 episode of Raw. Uso began a feud with The Bloodline, facing them along with Jimmy Uso and Roman Reigns on multi-men match at Crown Jewel, and Survivor Series: WarGames on November 30 in a WarGames match.

Uso began to work around the World Heavyweight Championship in 2025. His first match for the title took place at Saturday Night's Main Event, where he was defeated by Gunther. The following week at the Royal Rumble, Uso entered the namesake match as entrant #20, which he won by last eliminating John Cena, facing Gunther in the rematch for the title at WrestleMania 41, winning the title via submission. Uso held the title for 51 days, retaining against Seth Rollins, and Logan Paul, but lost it back to Gunther on the June 9 episode of Raw. At SummerSlam Night 1 on August 2, Uso and the returning Roman Reigns defeated Bron Breakker and Bronson Reed. Uso wrestled for the championship again at Clash in Paris in a Fatal 4 Way match and against CM Punk for the vacant title at Saturday Night's Main Event XLI, but didn't win the match. At the event on November 1, Uso lost to Punk for the title. At Survivor Series: WarGames on November 29, Jey along with Jimmy, Reigns, CM Punk and Cody Rhodes lost to Brock Lesnar, Drew McIntyre, Logan Paul and The Vision (Breakker and Reed) in a WarGames match after interference from a mysterious hooded figure which was later revealed to be Austin Theory.

==== Return to the tag team division (2025–present) ====
Jey Uso makes his way to the ring, the crowd performs his signature gesture. January 30, 2026

On the December 8 episode of Raw, Uso and Jimmy announced that they have reunited as The Usos and will be returning to tag team competition. On the December 29 episode of Raw, The Usos defeated AJ Styles and Dragon Lee to win the World Tag Team Championship, the ninth tag title reign for The Usos.

At the Royal Rumble on January 31, 2026, Uso entered the match at #25 being eliminated by eventual winner Roman Reigns. On the March 30, 2026 episode of Raw, The Usos lost their titles to The Vision (Logan Paul and Austin Theory) in a Street Fight, after interference from IShowSpeed ending their reign at 91 days. At Wrestlemania 42 Night 1 on April 18, The Usos teamed up with LA Knight to defeat The Vision (Paul and Theory) and IShowSpeed ending their feud. After WrestleMania 42, The Usos reunited with Reigns along with Jacob Fatu to officially reform The Bloodline. Later, in June 2026, Jey qualified for the final of the King of the ring tournament. At Night of Champions on June 27, Uso lost to Oba Femi in the King of the Ring finals. At Night 1 of SummerSlam on August 1, The Usos and Fatu lost to Knight, Sikoa and Royce Keys in a Six-Man Tag Team Match..

== Other media ==
He starred in the first episode of Outside the Ring, where he and his brother, Jimmy Uso cooked a traditional Samoan barbecue.

Jey made his video game debut in WWE '13 as a DLC. The Usos were not in WWE 2K14 but returned in WWE 2K15, and have continued to appear in WWE 2K16, WWE 2K17, WWE 2K18, WWE 2K19, WWE 2K20, WWE 2K22, WWE 2K23, WWE 2K24, WWE 2K25 and WWE 2K26. He also appeared uncredited in Countdown with Dolph Ziggler, Roman Reigns, and Big Show and his brother Jimmy Uso as well as the animated film The Jetsons & WWE: Robo-WrestleMania!, which he played a role as Usobots.

Jey made a brief appearance on the reality television series Total Divas due to his brother, Jimmy being married to Total Divas star Naomi.

Jey is regularly featured on Xavier Woods' YouTube channel UpUpDownDown, where he goes by the nickname 'Jucey'. He challenged Kofi Kingston for the title in a game of Tetris, where he defeated Kingston to win the championship.

After being named the number one contender for the WWE Universal Championship in September 2020, he was featured on an episode of the WWE Network mini documentary series WWE Chronicle.

He appeared on Inside season 3 episode 2, where he was featured in the temptation room for one of the contestants.

== Personal life ==
Fatu is of Samoan descent. As the son of WWE Hall of Famer Solofa Fatu Jr. (Rikishi), the twin brother of Jon Fatu (Jimmy Uso) and the brother of Joseph Fatu (Solo Sikoa), he is also part of the Anoaʻi family. His stage name "uso" means "brother" in the Samoan language. From 2011 to 2016, he performed the Samoan Siva Tau before their matches.

After meeting at Escambia High School, Fatu married Takecia Travis, his high school sweetheart, on February 13, 2014. They have two sons together and three French Bulldogs named Pongo, Mumble and Jax. Travis filed for divorce on July 6, 2026, after twelve years of marriage; she stated that their union was "irretrievably broken."

=== Legal issues ===
Fatu was arrested in January 2018 for driving while intoxicated in Hidalgo County, Texas after performing at a WWE live event held at Hidalgo's Payne Arena. He was released the same day after posting a $500 personal recognizance bond.

== Championships and accomplishments ==
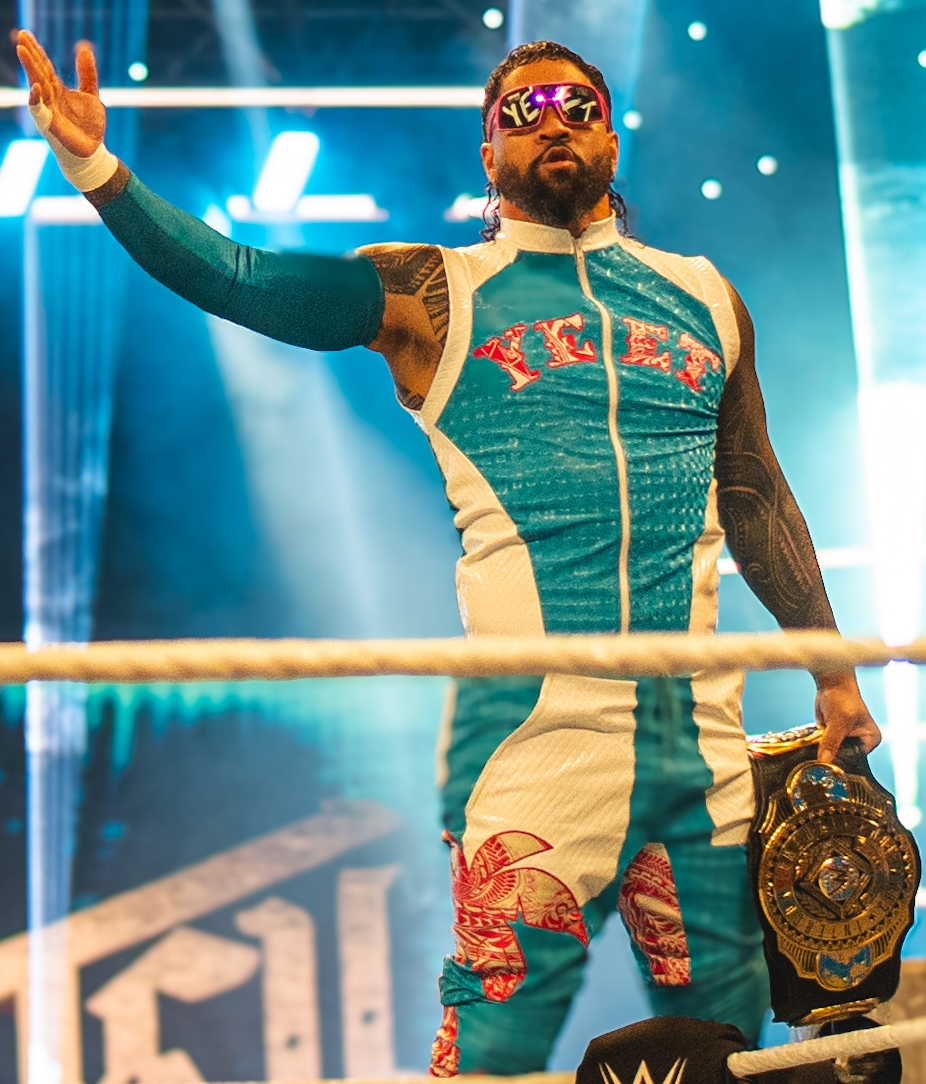
Uso is a one-time WWE Intercontinental Champion...

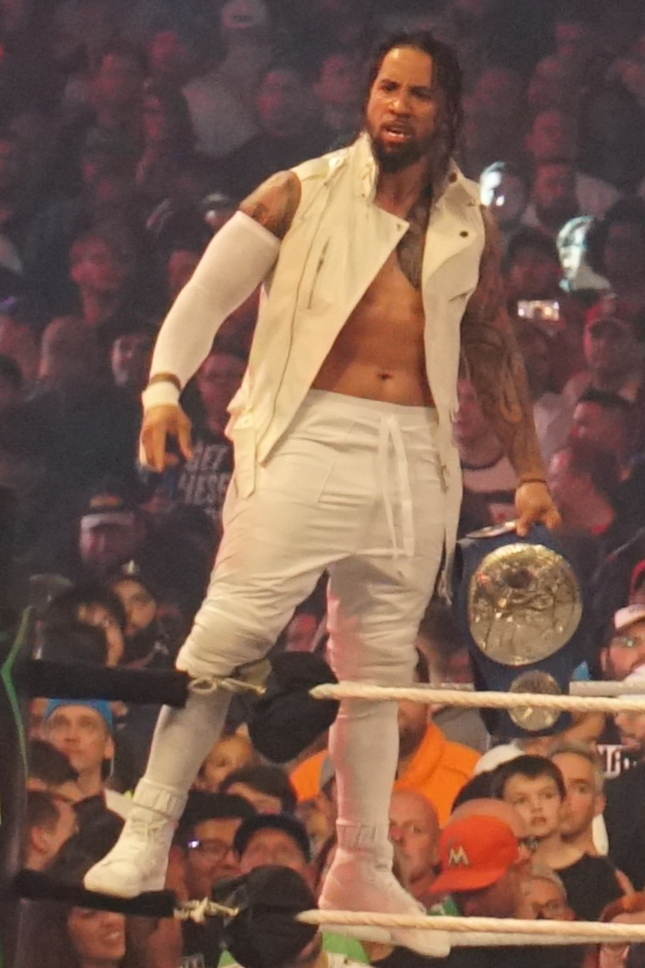
...and an overall 11-time tag team champion in WWE.

- CBS Sports
  - Feud of the Year (2020) vs. Roman Reigns
  - Tag Team of the Year (2018) with Jimmy Uso
- ESPN
  - Best storyline of the year (2022) part of The Bloodline and Sami Zayn
  - Tag team of the year (2022) with Jimmy Uso
- Florida Championship Wrestling
  - FCW Florida Tag Team Championship (1 time) – with Jimmy Uso
- New York Post
  - Storyline of the Year (2022) part of The Bloodline and Sami Zayn
- Pro Wrestling Illustrated
  - Faction of the Year (2022) – part of The Bloodline
  - Tag Team of the Year (2014) – with Jimmy Uso
  - Ranked No. 6 of the top 500 singles wrestlers in the PWI 500 in 2025
  - Ranked No. 1 of the top 50 Tag Teams in the PWI Tag Team 50 in 2022 – with Jimmy Uso
- Rolling Stone
  - Tag Team of the Year (2017) with Jimmy Uso
- Wrestling Observer Newsletter
  - Feud of the Year (2023) as part of The Bloodline vs. Kevin Owens and Sami Zayn
  - Worst Match of the Year (2024) vs. Jimmy Uso at WrestleMania XL
  - Most Overrated (2025)
- WWE
  - World Heavyweight Championship (1 time)
  - WWE Intercontinental Championship (1 time)
  - World Tag Team Championship (Note: The title was named the WWE Tag Team Championship during his first and second reigns & WWE Raw Tag Team Championship during his third & fourth reigns.) (5 times) – with Jimmy Uso (4) and Cody Rhodes (1) (Note: Held with the Smackdown Tag Team Championship as the Undisputed WWE Tag Team Championship.)
  - WWE SmackDown Tag Team Championship (6 times) – with Jimmy Uso (5) and Cody Rhodes (1) (Note: Held with the Raw Tag Team Championship as the Undisputed WWE Tag Team Championship.)
  - Men's Royal Rumble (2025)
  - André the Giant Memorial Battle Royal (2021)
  - WWE Intercontinental Championship #1 Contender Tournament (2024)
  - Slammy Award (4 times)
    - Tag Team of the Year (2014, 2015) – with Jimmy Uso
