= Power Pro Wrestling =

Wrestling promotion

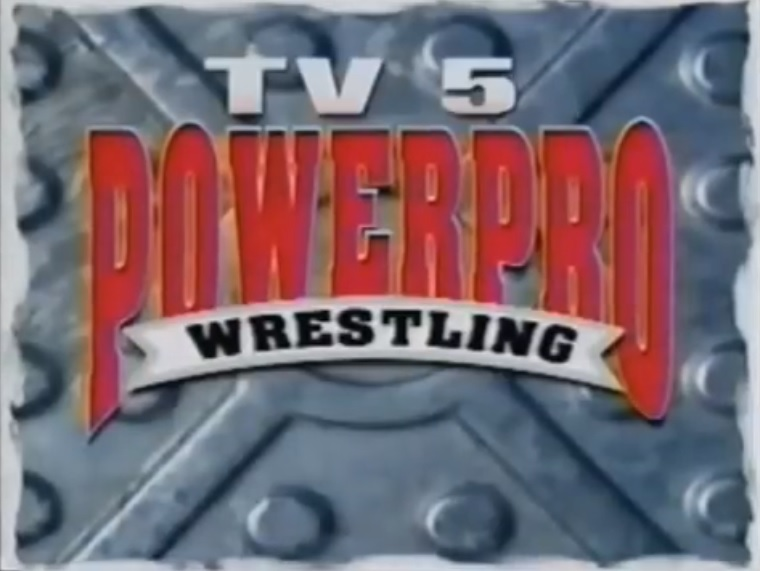
- Power Pro Wrestling's logo
- Acronym: PPW
- Founded: April 18, 1998
- Defunct: April 14, 2001
- Headquarters: Memphis, Tennessee
- Founder: Randy Hales
- Owner: Randy Hales
- Predecessor: United States Wrestling Association

Memphis Power Pro Wrestling (Power Pro Wrestling) was a Memphis, Tennessee based professional wrestling promotion that was founded by Randy Hales. It was affiliated with Memphis Championship Wrestling and World Wrestling Federation. It was one of the first developmental territories for the World Wrestling Federation. The roster featured WWF-contracted wrestlers sent for training and experience like Kurt Angle and Matt Bloom (Tensai/Albert), Bryan Danielson and Memphis wrestling legends Bill Dundee and Jerry Lawler, Brian Christopher and many others.

It operated from April 1998 to April 2001. The promotion was booked by Randy Hales and Brandon Baxter.

== Alumni ==
=== Male wrestlers ===
Birth name:	Ring name(s):	Tenure:	Notes
Kurt Angle	Kurt Angle	1999	
Matthew Anoa'i^{†}	Matt E. Smalls	1999	
Darrell Anthony	Dirty White Boy	1999	
Steve Bisson^{†}	Steve Bradley	1999–2000	
Numa Blanchard	Blade Boudreaux	1999–2000	
Matthew Bloom	Baldo	1998–1999	
Larry Booker^{†}	Moondog Spot	1998, 2000	
Thomas Boric	Paul Diamond / Venom	1998–1999	
Ruben Cain	Robert Gibson	1998, 2000	
Mark Canterbury	Henry O. Godwinn	1998^{WWF}	
Americo Costantino	Rico Constantino	1999–2000	
Thomas Couch^{†}	Tommy Rogers	2000	
William Crookshanks	Bill Dundee	1998–1999	
Harry Del Rios	Spellbinder / Streak	1998–1999	
Robert Dicks Jr.	Robbie D / Slick Robbie D	1999–2000	
Nicholas Dinsmore	Nick Dinsmore	1999–2000	
Sidney Eudy	Sid Vicious	1998^{WWF}	
James Fanning	Jimmy Valiant	1998, 2000	
Edward Fatu^{†}	OG Ekmo	1999	
Solofa Fatu Jr.	JR Smooth	1999	
Anthony Felker	Tony Falk / 2 Falk 4 Sure	1998–2000	
Kevin Fertig	Seven	1999–2000	
Nelson Frazier Jr.^{†}	King Mabel	1998^{WWF}	
Scott Garland	Scott Taylor	1999	
Doug Gilbert	Doug Gilbert	1999	
Terry Gordy^{†}	Terry Gordy	1999	
Terry Gordy Jr.	Ray Gordy	1999	
Bob Govoni	Bobby Doll	1998–1999	
Byron Greene^{†}	Johnny Rotten	1998	
Vic Grimes	Vic Grimes	1998–1999	
Michael Hegstrand^{†}	Road Warrior Hawk	1998	
Mark Henry	Mark Henry	1999	
Daniel Hollie	Damaja	2000	
Robert Horne	BJ Awesome / Rob Harlem / Sir Mo	1998, 2000	
Tim Horner	White Lightning	2000	
Robert Howard	Bombastic Bob	1998^{WWF}	
Glenn Jacobs	Kane	1998^{WWF}	
Jay Jaillet	Jay Jaillet	1999	
Brian James	Jesse James / Road Dog	1998^{WWF}	
Jeffrey Jarrett	Jeff Jarrett	1998^{WWF}	
Dwayne Johnson	Rocky Maivia	1998^{WWF}	
Steve Keirn	Steve Keirn	1999	
Hiram Keller^{†}	Heinrich Franz Keller / Trae Keller	1998–1999	
James Kimble	King Cobra	1998–1999	
Christopher Kindred	Flash Flanagan	1999–2000	
Dennis Knight	Phineas I. Godwinn	1998^{WWF}	
Glen Kulka	Glen Kulka	1999	
Alan Lamb	Alan Steel	1999–2000	
Wallace Lane	Stan Lane	1999	
Brian Lawler^{†}	Brian Christopher	1998–1999	
Jerry Lawler	Jerry Lawler	1998–1999, 2001	
Kevin Lawler	Kevin Christian / The Yellow Jacket	1998–1999	
James Lehman	Jagger	2000	
Michael Lockwood^{†}	Erin O'Grady	1998–1999	
Paul J. Mcknight	Moondog Rover	1998	
Lance McNaught^{†}	Lance Cade / Lance Jade	1999	
Gary Mize^{†}	Billy Joe Travis / Billy Travis	1998–1999	
Richard Morton	Ricky Morton	1998–1999	
Scott Oberholzer	Scotty Sabre	1999–2000	
Carl Ouellet	Kris Kannonball	1999	
Russell Payne Jr.	BJ Payne	1999–2000	
Alex Pliakis	Alex Arion	1999	
Bill Pierce	Chris Michaels	2000	
Mike Polchlopek	Bodacious Bart / Bart Gunn	1998^{WWF}	
Tom Prichard	Tom Prichard	1998–1999	
Scott Raines	Bulldog Raines	1998–2000	
Kenneth Raper	Ken Raper	1999	
Thomas Richardson	Tommy Rich	1999	
Michael Seitz	Michael "P.S." Hayes	1999	
Steve Sharpe	Ali Stevens	1999–2000	
Paulo César da Silva	Giant Silva	1998–1999	
Timothy Smith	Rex King	1998	
Tracy Smothers	Tracy Smothers / The Assassin	1998–2000	
Shawn Stipich	Meat / Shawn Stasiak	1998–1999^{WWF}	
Mike Walden	Cash Flo	1999	
Reginald Walt	Master B / Reggie B. Fine	1998–1999	
James Ware	Koko B. Ware	1998–1999	
Anthony Williams	Kid Wikkid / Tony Williams	1998–1999	
Frank Williams	Trailer Park Trash	1999–2000	
Kelly Wolfe	Wolfie D	1999–2000	
Steve Williams^{†}	Steve Williams	1999	
Unknown	Ashley Hudson / Australian Sensation	1998	
Unknown	Beau James / The Bodyguard	1998	
Unknown	Bobby Bronz / Bobby Brawnz	1998	
Unknown	CB Wyatt	1999	
Unknown	The Cremator	1999	
Unknown	Deon Harlem	2000	
Derrick Taylor	Derrick King / Tay Hi	1998–2000	
Unknown	Dynamite D	1999	
Unknown	Firecracker	1999	
Unknown	Freddy Krueger / Mr. Wrestling	1998	
Unknown	Jason Gibson	1998	
Unknown	Jason Lee	1998–2000	
Cory Radford	JD Hall	1999-2001	
Unknown	Jebediah	1999	
Unknown	Kip Morris	1999	
Unknown	Lance Jade	1998–2000	
Unknown	Loose Cannon	1999	
Unknown	Mick Tierney	1998–1999	
Charles White	Ric Havoc	2000	
Unknown	Ron McClarity	1998–1999	
Unknown	Scotty McKeever	1998	
Unknown	Swole	1998	
Unknown	Tony DeNucci	1998	
Unknown	Ugly Ed Johnson	1999	
Unknown	Youngblood	2000	

=== Female wrestlers ===
Birth name:	Ring name(s):	Tenure:	Notes
Nicole Bass^{†}	Nicole Bass	1999	
Stacy Carter	Lovely Stacy / Stacy Carter	1998–1999	
Jacqueline Moore	Jackie / Jacqueline	1998	
Johnnie Mae Young^{†}	Mrs. Stasiak	1999	
Unknown	Brianna Starr	1999	
Unknown	Danna Shepherd	1998	
Unknown	Paula Bunyan	1998	
Unknown	Samantha	1998	
Unknown	Vicious Vicki	1998	

=== Stables and tag teams ===
Tag team/Stable(s)	Members	Tenure(s)
The Fabulous Ones	Stan Lane and Steve Keirn	1999
The Fabulous Freebirds	Michael Hayes and Terry Gordy	1999
The Godwinns	Henry O. Godwinn and Phineas I. Godwinn	1998
Kings	Jerry Lawler and Bill Dundee	1998–1999
The Masked Thugs	Masked Thug #1 and Masked Thug #2	1998
The Midnight Express	Bombastic Bob and Bodacious Bart	1998
The Regulators	Deon Harlem and Rob Harlem	2000
The Rock 'n' Roll Express	Ricky Morton and Robert Gibson	1998
Suicide Blondes	Jason Lee and Derrick King	1999–2000
Too Much	Scott Taylor and Brian Christopher	1999

=== Managers and valets ===
Birth name:	Ring name(s):	Tenure:	Notes
Brandon Baxter	Brandon Baxter	1998–2001	
Jim Cornette	Jim Cornette	1998–2000	
Randy Hales	Randy Hales	1998–2000	
Bruno Lauer	Downtown Bruno	1998–1999	
Bruce Prichard	Bruce Prichard	1999	
Unknown	Miss Veronica	1998	

=== Commentators and interviewers ===
Birth name:	Ring name(s):	Tenure:	Notes
Dave Brown	Dave Brown	1998-2001	
Corey Maclin^{†}	Corey Maclin	1998-2001	

=== Other personnel ===
Birth name:	Ring name(s):	Tenure:	Notes
Brandon Baxter	Brandon Baxter	1998–2001	Booker
Randy Hales	Randy Hales	1998–2001	Promoter and Booker Buddy Wayne. Live Event Promoter Tony Falk. Producer and Agent

Notes
^{†} Indicates they are deceased.
^{‡} Indicates they died while they were employed with Power Pro Wrestling.
^{WWF} Indicates they were part of a talent exchange with the World Wrestling Federation.

== Championships ==
=== Power Pro Wrestling Heavyweight Championship ===
The PPW Heavyweight Championship was the top title contested for in the Power Pro Wrestling (later Memphis Power Pro Wrestling).

Champion	#	Date	Location	Notes
Baldo	1	January 29, 1999	Memphis, Tennessee	Beat Jerry Lawler in a tournament final to become the first champion.
Michael Hayes	1	March 7, 1999	Jonesboro, Arkansas	Won the title by pinning Baldo in a tag team match, with Hayes teaming with Brandon Baxter against Randy Hales & Baldo.
J.R. Smooth	1	May 8, 1999	Memphis, Tennessee	
Kurt Angle	1	July 24, 1999	Memphis, Tennessee	
Steve Bradley	1	August 7, 1999	Memphis, Tennessee	
Vic Grimes	1	September 18, 1999	Memphis, Tennessee	
Steve Bradley	2	September 25, 1999	Memphis, Tennessee	
Rico Constantino	1	December 4, 1999	Memphis, Tennessee	
Steve Bradley	3	January 15, 2000	Memphis, Tennessee	
Ali	1	January 19, 2000	Memphis, Tennessee	
Wolfie D	1	April 8, 2000	Memphis, Tennessee	
Vacant		May 27, 2000		Wolfie D was stripped because he couldn't defend the title.
Wolfie D	2	May 27, 2000	Memphis, Tennessee	Beat Ali for the vacant title.
Spellbinder	1	July 2, 2000	Memphis, Tennessee	
Steven Bradley	4	January 13, 2001	Corinth, MS	Also holds the Memphis Championship Wrestling Southern Heavyweight Championship.
Pete Gas		March 17, 2001		Pete Gas was stripped when Power Pro Wrestling ends its affiliation with World Wrestling Federation because Gas is under contract to WWF.
Promotion closes in April 2001

=== Power Pro Wrestling Tag Team Championship ===
The PPW Tag Team Championship was a title contended for in the Power Pro Wrestling later Memphis Power Pro Wrestling promotion.

Team	#	Date	Location	Notes
Billy Travis & Bulldog Raines	1	July 21, 1998	Memphis, Tennessee	Beat The Rock 'n' Roll Express (Ricky Morton & Robert Gibson) in a tournament final to become champions.
Vacant				Title vacant in early 1999
Kid Wikkid & Derrick King	1	March 7, 1999	Jonesboro, Arkansas	Won a tournament for the vacant title.
Vacant		March 19, 1999	Memphis, Tennessee	Vacant after a match between Wikkid & King and Erin O'Grady & Vic Grimes.
Erin O'Grady & Vic Grimes	1	March 20, 1999	Memphis, Tennessee	Defeated Kid Wikkid & Derrick King in a rematch.
Kid Wikkid & Derrick King	2	April 3, 1999	Jonesboro, Arkansas	
Jerry Lawler & Bill Dundee	1	April 17, 1999	Memphis, Tennessee	Lawler won the belts in a handicap match when Dundee no showed.
Glenn Kulka & Mic Tierney	1	October 2, 1999		This was a phantom title change. The title became vacant after Bill Dundee left the company.
Vacant				Titles became vacant in November 1999 when Kulka left the promotion.
Derrick King (3) & Jason Lee	1	January 22, 2000	Memphis, Tennessee	Beat Tony Falk & Blade and Bulldog Raines & Robbie D in a triple threat match tournament final.
Wolfie D	1	January 29, 2000	Memphis, Tennessee	Wins handicap match.
Derrick King (4) & Moondog Spot	1	March 18, 2000	Memphis, Tennessee	
The Regulators (Deon & Rob Harlem)	1	April 8, 2000	Memphis, Tennessee	Beat Derrick King in a handicap match.
Deactivated		March 17, 2001		The Regulators is stripped of the titles because the promotion closed.

=== Power Pro Wrestling Television Championship ===
The PPW Television title was a secondary championship contested for in Power Pro Wrestling/Memphis Power Pro Wrestling.

Champion	#	Date	Location	Notes
Blade	1	March 25, 2000	Memphis, Tennessee	Won a Battle royal to become the first champion.
Khan	1	June 24, 2000	Memphis, Tennessee	
Bulldog Raines	1	December 2, 2000	Memphis, Tennessee	
RodRageous	1	January 27, 2001	Memphis, Tennessee	
Grandmaster Sexay	1	February 21, 2001	Jonesboro, Arkansas	This was a joint MCW/PPW/WWF event. Sexay substituted for K-Kwik.
RodRageous	2	February 24, 2001	Memphis, Tennessee	
Vacant		March 17, 2001		PPW ends relationship with WWF. RodRageous is stripped because he is under contract with WWF.

=== Power Pro Wrestling Young Guns Championship ===
The PPW Young Guns title was a secondary championship contested for in Power Pro Wrestling/Memphis Power Pro Wrestling.

=== Power Pro Wrestling Hardcore Championship ===
The PPW Hardcore title was a secondary championship contested for in Power Pro Wrestling/Memphis Power Pro Wrestling.

== See also ==
- List of independent wrestling promotions in the United States
