= Vic Grimes =

American professional wrestler (born 1963)

Personal information
- Born: Victor Grimes; January 3, 1963 (age 63) Sacramento, California, U.S.

Professional wrestling career
- Ring name(s): Grimes; Key; Vic Grimes; Vic Murdoch
- Billed height: 6 ft 4 in (193 cm)
- Billed weight: 315 lb (143 kg)
- Billed from: Sacramento, California
- Trained by: Dory Funk Jr. Michael Modest; Spike Dudley; Roland Alexander; Manny Fernandez; All Pro Wrestling
- Debut: 1996
- Retired: 2007

Victor Grimes (born January 3, 1963) is an American ex professional wrestler. He is best known for his appearances with Extreme Championship Wrestling (ECW), Xtreme Pro Wrestling (XPW), and the World Wrestling Federation (WWF).

Grimes began his wrestling career in California's All Pro Wrestling, before working for the WWF. In the WWF, Grimes portrayed the character Key, a drug dealer. After a short tenure, Grimes debuted in ECW and joined the stable Da Baldies. He subsequently worked for XPW, where he continued his feud with New Jack that had begun in ECW. He also appeared in MTV's short-lived wrestling promotion Wrestling Society X.

== Professional wrestling career ==
=== All Pro Wrestling (1996–1998) ===
Grimes began his career in California's All Pro Wrestling (APW) promotion, where he had a series of matches against Erin O'Grady. This "little man vs. big man" feud between the two even escalated to the point of O'Grady running into Grimes with a car.

=== World Wrestling Federation (1998–1999) ===
J.R. Benson sent Jim Cornette a tape of Grimes and O'Grady's feud in APW and scheduled them for a dark match before a taping of WWF Shotgun Saturday Night on January 20, 1998. WWF officials signed both men to contracts.

Grimes was moved to the Memphis developmental territories before being brought up to television under the ring name Key. He made his televised WWF debut on the July 26, 1999 episode of Raw. As Key, Grimes portrayed a drug dealer character along with Droz and Prince Albert and feuded with The Godfather. The Godfather suffered an injury just as the feud between the two was developing, which along with issues Al Snow had with Grimes, lead to Grimes being taken off TV.

=== Extreme Championship Wrestling (1999–2000) ===
After Al Snow, who Grimes had had a match with, said he was bad to work with, the WWF encouraged Grimes to work for the Extreme Championship Wrestling (ECW) promotion to further develop his skills. There, Grimes joined Tony DeVito and Spanish Angel, replacing P. N. News, in Da Baldies. The highlights of his ECW tenure were a fast-paced match against Kid Kash, an ECW World Heavyweight Title shot against Mike Awesome, and a Danbury Street Fight with Tommy Dreamer.

During Living Dangerously in March 2000, a breakdown in communication between New Jack and Grimes led to both men tumbling off a 20-foot high scaffolding rig onto concrete. New Jack suffered brain damage and was permanently blinded in his right eye, which kept him out of wrestling for several months. Grimes departed ECW not long after this incident.

=== Xtreme Pro Wrestling (2001–2003) ===
Following ECW's closing, New Jack went to Xtreme Pro Wrestling, and his feud with Grimes was re-ignited when Grimes surprisingly attacked New Jack from behind with a guitar at Payback's a Bitch event; New Jack was involved in a verbal dispute with XPW CEO Rob Black when Grimes appeared through the mat from under the ring and attacked New Jack, aligning himself with Black's faction, "The Black Army". The beginning of the newly ignited feud featured both men in a tag match, with Grimes teaming with The Messiah and New Jack aligning himself with Supreme; during the match New Jack was powerbombed by Grimes through a flaming table, and New Jack was on fire for over 10 seconds. Other major points of the feud featured New Jack diving off the Los Angeles Grand Olympic Auditorium balcony over 30 feet onto two tables, with Grimes on top of both, at Redemption in May 2001, as well as Grimes throwing New Jack off the same balcony through many tables stacked below at New Year's Revolution in January 2002.

The feud culminated in February 2002 in a scaffold match, as towards the end of the match, Jack broke from the script and legitimately shocked Grimes with a taser before throwing Grimes from the scaffold and sending him crashing to the ring 40 feet below; there were over 12 tables stacked on top of each other to break the fall, but Grimes missed all but two of them and came within less than a foot of missing the ring completely. Grimes broke his fall on the top rope, dislocating his ankle and suffering multiple other injuries in the process. In the 2005 documentary Forever Hardcore, New Jack claimed that his intentions were to throw Grimes so hard that he would fall head-first onto the steel turnbuckle and die, as retaliation for the now infamous Danbury Fall at Living Dangerously 2000. Some believe this to have been a 'work' on New Jack's part as closer inspection of the footage appears to show that Grimes threw himself off the scaffolding at an unexpected angle and with more velocity than intended.

When Shane Douglas took control of XPW following Baptized in Blood 3, Grimes remained with the promotion and engaged in feuds with Douglas and Snuff. During a tag match between Douglas and Lizzy Borden against Grimes and Lucy, Grimes botched a superbomb on Borden through a table on the outside of the ring, as Borden missed the table completely and landed head first on the floor. Grimes also wrestled against several cruiserweights such as Psicosis, Little Guido, and Altar Boy Luke.

=== Independent circuit (2003–2006) ===
After XPW folded, Grimes went on to work for various Californian independent promotions.

=== Wrestling Society X (2006) ===
In 2006, Grimes took part in MTV's new wrestling show, Wrestling Society X. He made his debut for the WSX dubbed as "Vicious" Vic Grimes alongside Arik Cannon in a 3-on-2 handicap match against The Cartel, who Cannon had been attacked by a couple of weeks ago. However, Grimes and Cannon lost to The Cartel. Two episodes later, Cannon and Grimes competed against Luke Hawx and Al Katrazz, during which Grimes missed a spear on Katrazz and landed into some light tubes at ringside, allowing Cannon to be pinned by Katrazz. Grimes remained with the promotion until its closure.

=== Late career (2006–2007) ===
Following his appearances with Wrestling Society X Grimes returned to the independent circuit. He retired in 2007.

== Other media ==
He appeared in the video game Backyard Wrestling 2: There Goes the Neighborhood.

== Championships and accomplishments ==
- All Pro Wrestling
  - APW Tag Team Championship (2 times) – with Little Dic Grimes (1) and Frank Murdoch (1)
  - APW Universal Heavyweight Championship (1 time)
- BRAWL Wrestling
  - BRAWL Heavyweight Championship (1 time)
- Power Pro Wrestling
  - PPW Heavyweight Championship (1 time)
  - PPW Tag Team Championship (1 time) – with Erin O'Grady
  - PPW Young Guns Championship (2 times)
- Pro Wrestling Illustrated
  - PWI ranked him #270 of the 500 best singles wrestlers of the year in the PWI 500 in 2001
- Xtreme Pro Wrestling
  - King of the Deathmatch Tournament (2001)
