= Rikishi (wrestler) =

American professional wrestler (born 1965)

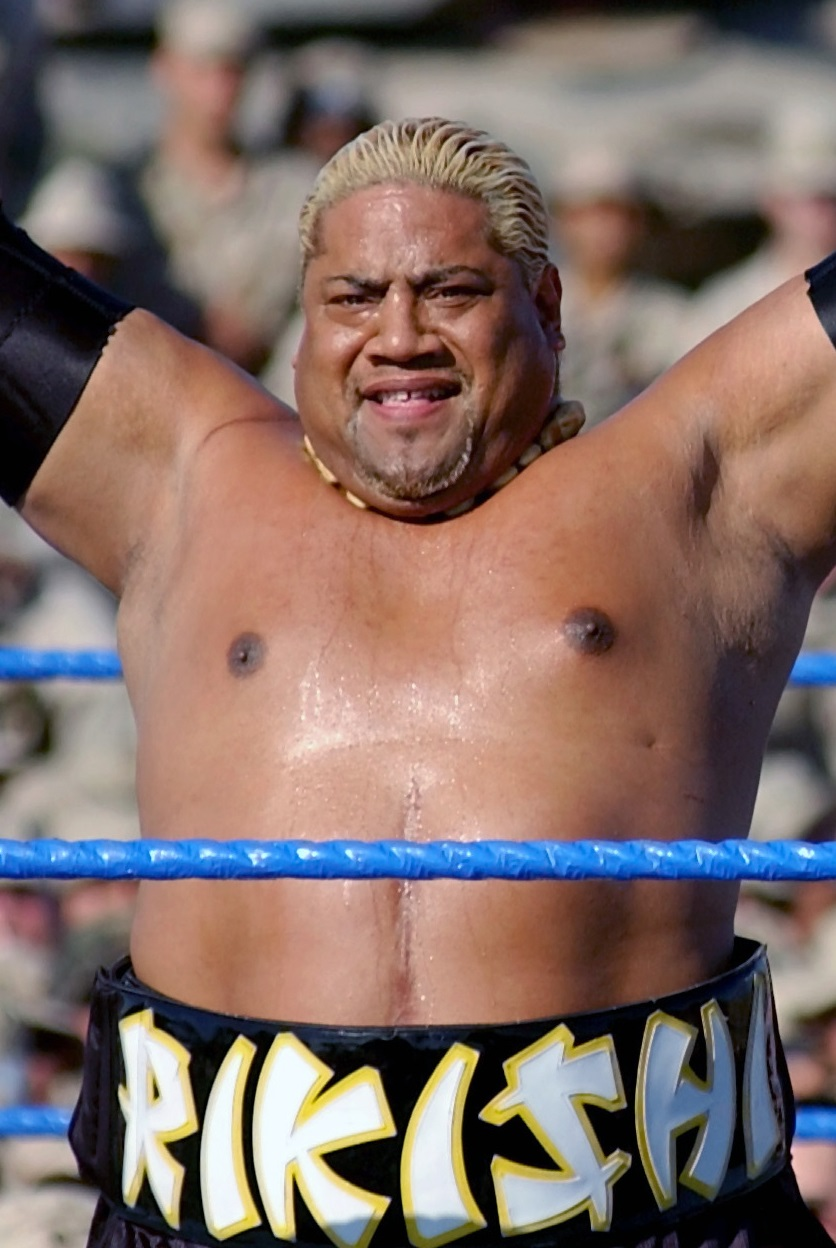
- Fatu in 2003

Personal information
- Born: Solofa Fatu Jr. 1964 or 1965 (age 60–61) San Francisco, California, U.S.
- Spouse: Talisua Fuavai-Fatu (m. 1985)
- Children: 8 (including Jonathan, Joshua and Joseph)
- Family: Anoaʻi
- Website: rikishifatu.com

Professional wrestling career
- Ring name(s): Alofa the Polynesian Prince; Fatu; Headshrinker Fatu; Hustle Rikishi; J.R. Smooth; Junior Fatu; Kishi "Make a Difference" Fatu; Rikishi; Riki-Shi; Rikishi Phatu; Solofa Fatu Jr. The Sultan; Sumo Rikishi
- Billed height: 6 ft 1 in (185 cm)
- Billed weight: 425 lb (193 kg)
- Billed from: "The Isle of Samoa" "The streets of San Francisco by way of Stamford" (as "Make a Difference" Fatu) "The Middle East" (as The Sultan)
- Debut: 1985

Solofa Fatu Jr. (born c. 1965) is an American professional wrestler, best known under the ring names Rikishi and Fatu with the World Wrestling Entertainment (WWE) and under a variety of names in New Japan Pro-Wrestling (NJPW), World Championship Wrestling (WCW) and Total Nonstop Action Wrestling (TNA). He is also the owner of the independent promotion KnokX Pro Wrestling (KnokX) and the KnokX Pro Wrestling Academy.

Born in San Francisco, Fatu debuted in the professional wrestling business in 1985 as Prince Alofa and later competed with the Samoan SWAT Team in Japan and multiple wrestling promotions across the United States. In 1992, Fatu made his debut for the World Wrestling Federation, employing multiple gimmicks during his early run. He returned to the WWF in 1998 where he was repackaged as a sumo wrestler character named Rikishi Phatu, in which he dropped his last name when he began teaming with the popular Too Cool tag team. During his tenure with the company, Fatu has held the WWF Intercontinental Championship (1 time), the World Tag Team Championship (2 times), and the WWE Tag Team Championship (1 time). After leaving the WWE in 2004, he would appear in the independent circuit, along with a short stint in TNA as Junior Fatu in 2007. He was inducted into the WWE Hall of Fame in 2015.

Fatu is the father of Jimmy Uso, Jey Uso, and Solo Sikoa. As a prominent member of the Anoaʻi family of Samoan wrestlers, he is the brother of Sam Fatu and Umaga, uncle of Jacob Fatu and the cousin of Rosey, Yokozuna and Roman Reigns.

== Early life ==
Solofa Fatu was born in San Francisco and grew up in the Sunnydale Projects in the Visitacion Valley neighborhood, where his maternal grandparents were preachers. He attended Balboa High School, and competed on the wrestling team.

In 1982, when he was seventeen years old, Fatu was wounded in a drive-by shooting that left him with a scar on his abdomen; he claimed in a 2021 interview that he had died for three minutes in the emergency room before being revived. He spent two months in the hospital, after which his mother, fearing for his safety, sent him out of state to live with her brothers Afa and Sika Anoaʻi, with whom he trained to become a professional wrestler.

== Professional wrestling career ==
=== Early career (1985–1986) ===
Fatu began his wrestling career in 1985, working for Gino Brito and Dino Bravo's Lutte Internationale promotion in Montreal as Prince Alofa, a high-flying babyface. He often teamed with the territory's top faces. Fatu also worked for International Championship Wrestling in New York City in that same year.

=== New Japan Pro Wrestling and World Wrestling Council (1986–1987) ===
He and his cousin Samula Anoaʻi became the Samoan Swat Team (Samu and Fatu) in 1986 for New Japan Pro Wrestling. In 1987, they signed with the World Wrestling Council in Puerto Rico and they used the "Samoan savage" gimmick their relatives The Wild Samoans successfully used by working barefoot, never publicly speaking English, and no-selling attacks to the head. They became the new WWC Caribbean Tag Team Champions (after a long vacancy) on November 7, 1987, in Guaynabo, Puerto Rico after defeating Invader I and Invader III. They held the title for just over a month before dropping it to Mark and Chris Youngblood before leaving the promotion.

=== World Class Wrestling Association (1988–1989) ===
Samu and Fatu next appeared in Texas, working for Fritz Von Erich's World Class Championship Wrestling. Storywise, Buddy Roberts brought them in to fight his fights against the Von Erich family and former Fabulous Freebirds partner Michael Hayes. The SST defeated Kerry and Kevin Von Erich for the WCWA World Tag Team Championship on August 12, 1988. They remained undefeated in WCCW until they dropped the belts to Hayes and his new partner, Steve Cox, on September 12. They recaptured the title four days later. Hayes and Cox beat them for the title again on October 15, and, two days later, lost it back again.

On September 12, 1988, The Samoan Swat Team became double champions by beating "Hollywood" John Tatum and Jimmy Jack Funk for the WCWA Texas Tag Team Championship. They made their pay-per-view debut at AWA SuperClash III. In early 1989, the SST left WCCW, vacating both championships.

=== World Championship Wrestling (1989–1990) ===
SST signed with World Championship Wrestling, introduced as manager Paul E. Dangerously's replacement for The Original Midnight Express (Randy Rose and Dennis Condrey), who had left the promotion. The SST took over the Express' feud with The Midnight Express (Bobby Eaton and Stan Lane), beating them at Clash of the Champions VI: Ragin' Cajun on April 2, 1989. The SST teamed with former rival Michael Hayes, Terry Gordy, and Jimmy Garvin at the 1989 Great American Bash, losing a WarGames match to The Road Warriors, The Midnight Express, and Steve Williams.

In the fall of 1989, Paul E. Dangerously was phased out and the SST took a new manager, "The Big Kahuna" Oliver Humperdink. They were also joined by Fatu's brother, The Samoan Savage. The SST lost more and more matches as 1989 drew to a close, but got a break when Sid Vicious was injured, leading his team, The Skyscrapers, to pull out of the "Iron Team Tournament" at Starrcade 1989. Fatu and The Samoan Savage, rebranded as The New Wild Samoans, replaced them. For the rest of their WCW career, Fatu and Savage teamed, while Samu only wrestled singles matches.

=== Japan and Mexico (1990–1991) ===
After leaving WCW in the summer of 1990, Fatu and Savage worked for several independent promotions in the US, Europe, Puerto Rico and Japan, often teaming with cousin Kokina Maximus. The three worked for the Universal Wrestling Association in 1991, where they won the UWA Trios Tag Team Championship and held it for just under two months. They headlined the UWA's 16th anniversary show, losing the title to Dos Caras, El Canek, and Mil Máscaras.

=== World Wrestling Federation (1992–1998) ===
==== The Headshrinkers (1992–1995) ====
After Samu and Fatu joined the World Wrestling Federation, they were renamed The Headshrinkers, but their savage gimmick remained. Kokina Maximus also joined the WWF, but was repackaged as Japanese sumo wrestler Yokozuna, and his relation to The Headshrinkers was not acknowledged. The Headshrinker's first notable angle came when they interfered to help Money Inc. beat The Natural Disasters for the WWF World Tag Team Championship. Soon after, The Headshrinkers feuded with The Natural Disasters and the recently formed High Energy.

Between 1992 and early 1994, The Headshrinkers occasionally challenged for the tag title and made sporadic PPV appearances, feuding with The Smoking Gunns and Men on a Mission. Fatu would receive a WWF Championship match against Bret Hart on the March 1, 1993 episode of Monday Night RAW. Despite interference by Samu, Fatu was unsuccessful.

The Headshrinkers helped Yokozuna win a casket match against The Undertaker at the 1994 Royal Rumble. In April, they turned face, took Lou Albano as their manager and challenged tag champions The Quebecers. They won the gold on the May 2 episode of Monday Night RAW. At King of the Ring on June 19, they successfully defended the title against Yokozuna and Crush. Their title reign ended at a house show in Indianapolis on August 28, when they lost to Shawn Michaels and Diesel. This happened a day before they were scheduled to defend against Irwin R. Schyster and Bam Bam Bigelow at SummerSlam. The match went on without the title, and The Headshrinkers lost by disqualification.

Soon after, Samu left the WWF to recover from injuries and was replaced by Sione (formerly The Barbarian). They were called The New Headshrinkers. The storyline reason for Samu's departure was that he was not coping well with manager Lou Albano's attempts to civilize him, particularly about wearing boots. The New Headshrinkers made only two PPV appearances, at the 1994 Survivor Series, where they were eliminated from their ten-man tag match, but helped their team win and at the 1995 Royal Rumble; Sione lasted about seven minutes early on and Fatu over five nearer the end. They entered a tournament to crown new WWF tag team champions in late 1994/early 1995, and lost to Bam Bam Bigelow and Tatanka in the semi-finals. For the first half of 1995, they worked with Jacob and Eli Blu, usually putting them over. Their final match was a loss to Men on a Mission at a June 22 house show in London, England, after which Sione left for WCW and Fatu was removed from WWF television.

==== "Make a Difference" (1995–1996) ====
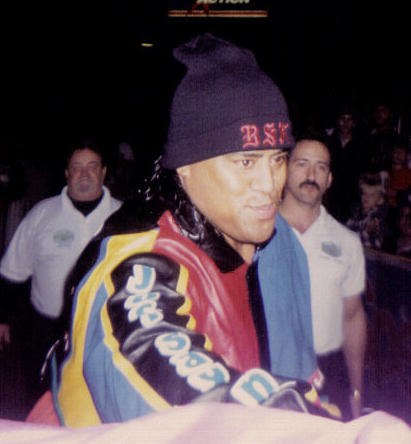
Fatu during his "Make a Difference" gimmick in 1995

After a brief hiatus, Fatu reappeared as a singles wrestler in July 1995 repackaged as a streetwise positive role model, for which he filmed several vignettes in his old San Francisco neighborhood touching on his real-life upbringing in the ghetto and preaching the messages of staying in school and saying no to drugs, all while he spoke fluent English. Each segment ended with the onscreen phrase "Make a Difference", making it the unofficial name of the gimmick. Fatu made his in-ring return on July 29 by pinning Rad Radford on WWF Superstars, and then enjoyed a run of victories over enhancement talent for the remainder of the year. However, the character did not get over with fans, and in 1996 Fatu was regularly booked to lose to stars such as Steve Austin, Vader, and Hunter Hearst Helmsley. Two men known as "The Samoan Gangster Party" (Fatu's cousins Samu and Lloyd Anoaʻi) additionally began showing up in the audience during his matches, but no storylines were ever developed. The "Make a Difference" gimmick was dropped in April 1996.

==== The Sultan (1996–1998) ====
In August 1996, Fatu was repackaged as a heel known as The Sultan, a red masked wrestler with curved shoes who never spoke, ostensibly because his tongue was cut out. He was managed by The Iron Sheik and Bob Backlund. He unsuccessfully challenged Rocky Maivia for the WWF Intercontinental Championship at WrestleMania 13. The Sultan vanished in January 1998, and Fatu left to train at Dory Funk's Funking Conservatory wrestling school. He would work from 1998 to 1999 in the independent circuit. Originally ECW star Sabu was to play The Sultan but according to Sabu in a shoot interview, he turned down the offer because he did not want to be managed by The Iron Sheik, wanting his uncle The Original Sheik to be his manager, but the WWF rejected the idea.

=== Independent circuit (1998–1999) ===
After WWF, Fatu continued his Sultan gimmick in the independent circuit losing to Jimmy Snuka on March 3, 1998. He reunited with Samu as the Headshrinkers working for his uncle's promotion World Xtreme Wrestling in Pennsylvania. Later that year he feuded with Billy Two Eagles for Elite Canadian Championship Wrestling in British Columbia as Fatu which lasted a year. On April 28, 1999, Fatu teamed with his cousin Yokozuna to defeat Skull Murphy Jr., Danny Collins and Blondie Barratt in a handicap match in London, England.

In May 1999, Fatu made his debut in Memphis for Power Pro Wrestling as J.R. Smooth, a rap gimmick where he started dying his hair blonde and wore sunglasses. He defeated Michael Hayes for the PPW Heavyweight Championship. He would feud with Kurt Angle and dropped the title to Angle on July 24.

=== Return to WWF/E (1999–2004) ===
==== Too Cool and Intercontinental Champion (1999–2000) ====
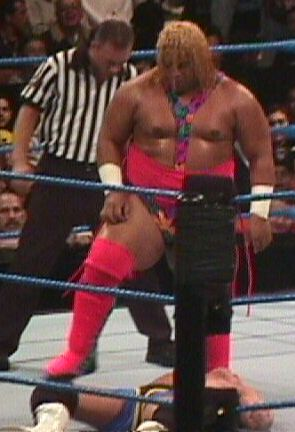
Rikishi wrestling Crash Holly in November 1999

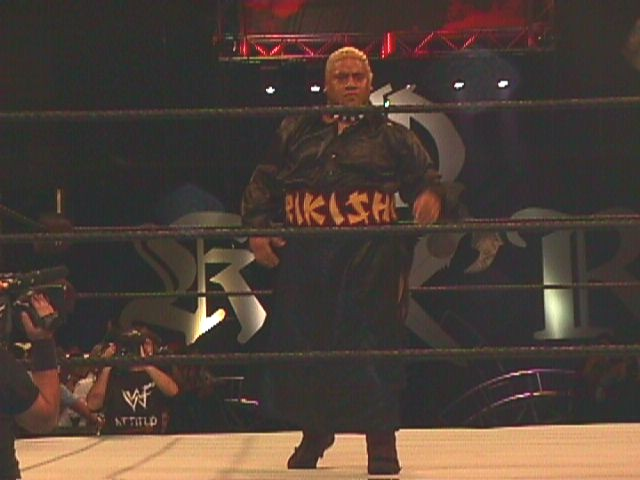
Rikishi at King of the Ring in June 2000

After training at Funk's and working in the independents, Fatu returned on October 5, 1999, for a dark match for Sunday Night Heat defeating Crash Holly. On the November 13, 1999 episode of WWF Metal as Rikishi Fatu, beating Julio Fantastico. Rikishi is the general Japanese term for a sumo wrestler, similar to his cousin's ring name "Yokozuna". "Fatu" soon became "Phatu", until he dropped the last name entirely after he started teaming with Too Cool. No mention was made of his WWF past. He had gained some weight, bleached his hair blonde, and wore a mawashi. Per Vince McMahon's request and Fatu's own willingness to honor sumo tradition, nothing was worn underneath the mawashi and his buttcheeks were exposed; this was unlike Yokozuna, who wore tights underneath the loincloth, which both McMahon and Fatu felt were unnecessary for the Yokozuna character. His ring gear gained immediate attention; on his televised debut with the gimmick on WWF Metal, play-by-play announcer Kevin Kelly responded that he was "a little concerned with, well, Rikishi Fatu's well...garment, or lack thereof," with color commentator Tom Prichard responding that "there isn't much of a garment there!".

On November 22, 1999, on Monday Night Raw, Rikishi helped Too Cool from being attacked by the Mean Street Posse. It was the first time Rikishi's character debuted on Raw, and the first time Too Cool and Rikishi were in the ring together. Rikishi briefly feuded with Viscera before forming a wildly popular alliance with the duo Too Cool (Grand Master Sexay and Scotty 2 Hotty). One night, during Too Cool's traditional post-match dance routine, Rikishi joined them. As the dance routines became more frequent and longer, this popularity translated to a significant push. In the 2000 Royal Rumble match, he and Too Cool did the dance to their respective songs, much to the delight of the audience. He later eliminated seven opponents, and it took six wrestlers working together to eliminate him.

Rikishi also became known for his infamous signature maneuver – the Stink Face – as his buttocks were rubbed into the faces of opposing wrestlers. When his opponent was incapacitated in the corner of the ring, Rikishi would slap his buttocks to indicate the attack, and then he would turn around, hike his thong up, and smother his buttocks into his victim's face. On an episode of Raw on May 15, 2000, Stephanie McMahon described Rikishi's buttocks as "bulbous", "smelly" and "sweaty" when describing the Stink Face. Kurt Angle, who received a Stink Face from Rikishi, said, "It was the worst smell I ever smelt in my life." The Stink Face also served as a finishing move at times, as wrestlers became physically ill from the maneuver, forcing them to leave the ring and thereby losing via count out. The Stink Face became known as the most repulsive move in the World Wrestling Federation, and this humiliating maneuver became very popular with the fans.

In May 2000, fan favorites Rikishi and Too Cool feuded with Edge, Christian and Kurt Angle, culminating in a victory at Judgment Day. After winning the Intercontinental Championship from Chris Benoit on the June 22 episode of SmackDown!, Rikishi qualified for the 2000 King of the Ring tournament. On June 25, at King of the Ring, he defeated Benoit in the quarterfinals and Val Venis in the semis. Both opponents hit him with a steel chair after losing, weakening his shoulder and helping Kurt Angle defeat him in the final. Stemming from Venis' attack, Rikishi faced him on July 6 and lost the title after Tazz hit him with a television camera. They rematched in a steel cage at Fully Loaded. In this match, Rikishi climbed the cage and, in an allusion to Jimmy Snuka, splashed Venis from the top. Rikishi soon lost the match after Tazz again hit him with a camera.

==== Heel turn and main event status (2000–2001) ====
On the October 9 episode of Raw, Commissioner Mick Foley accused Rikishi of being the person who had run over Stone Cold Steve Austin almost a year earlier at Survivor Series, which was the day after the Rikishi gimmick officially debuted in the WWF. This was due to Scotty 2 Hotty unknowingly revealing to Foley that Rikishi was at Survivor Series when he was explaining to Foley his whereabouts on the day Stone Cold was hit. When Foley confronted Rikishi about it, he admitted to running down Stone Cold. Rikishi then said he attacked Austin in order to allow his cousin The Rock an opportunity for stardom, insisting that Buddy Rogers, Bruno Sammartino, Bob Backlund, Hulk Hogan and Austin – "The Great White Hope" – had always been pushed, at the expense of Samoan wrestlers like Peter Maivia, Jimmy Snuka, Samu, Yokozuna and The Rock. After accepting full responsibility for the hit-and-run, as well as clearing The Rock of any culpability in the process, Rikishi then said if he was being honest he would run Austin down again. Rikishi left the ring and then turned heel.

Austin immediately set out for revenge, facing Rikishi in a No Holds Barred match at No Mercy on October 22. The match went to a no contest when Austin dragged Rikishi to the parking lot and tried to run him over; a police car drove in front of Austin's, saving Rikishi. Though arrested, Austin had brutally attacked Rikishi, cutting and bruising his face. Later that night, Rikishi interfered in The Rock's WWF Championship defense against Kurt Angle, but "accidentally" kicked the champ, allowing Angle to Angle Slam them both and win the title. After several attacks on Austin by an unseen assailant, it became clear that Rikishi had an accomplice. During a handicap match pitting Rikishi and Angle against Austin, Triple H came to the ring, seemingly to aid Austin, but swerved the audience by attacking him with a sledgehammer. Triple H then revealed he had masterminded the Survivor Series assault and hired Rikishi to drive the car.

While Austin began feuding with Triple H, Rikishi's tension with The Rock boiled over. Despite delivering a Stink Face to the Rock, Rikishi would lose to him in a match at Survivor Series on November 19. He then participated in a six-man Hell in a Cell WWF Championship match at Armageddon on December 10. Vince McMahon drove a flatbed truck ringside in an effort to dismantle the cage and stop the match. Before he could, commissioner Mick Foley had McMahon, Pat Patterson and Gerald Brisco forcibly removed from the arena by security. The Undertaker then chokeslammed Rikishi from the top of the cell onto the wood chip-covered bed. Kurt Angle later retained the title.

In January 2001, Rikishi won a Fatal Four Way match on SmackDown! for the #30 spot in the 2001 Royal Rumble match involving The Rock, The Undertaker, and Kane, after he pinned Kane. There, he eliminated The Undertaker, and was soon eliminated by The Rock. Haku returned to the WWF in the Rumble, and he and Rikishi formed a tag team and feuded with The Brothers of Destruction, The Dudley Boyz then The Hardy Boyz. The team split while Rikishi was sidelined with an eardrum injury in March. He returned on the May 3 SmackDown! and fought The Undertaker to no-contest. On the next Raw, he turned face once again and gave the Stink Face to Stephanie McMahon after she distracted him and cost him a non-title match with Austin. On May 20, at Judgment Day, he injured his shoulder in the opening bout with William Regal, which caused him to miss much of the year and the entire Invasion angle.

==== Various storylines, reunion with Scotty 2 Hotty and departure (2001–2004) ====
Rikishi returned on the December 6 episode of SmackDown!, delivering a Stink Face to Vince McMahon and solidifying his face status. However Rikishi never regained the same amount of popularity he once had in the year 2000; he also never got another main event push. Upon the WWF Brand Extension in March 2002, Rikishi was drafted to the SmackDown! brand. At Judgment Day on May 19, he faced Billy and Chuck in a "secret partner" match. His partner turned out to be Rico, Billy and Chuck's stylist. Despite Rico's best efforts to unfairly help Billy and Chuck, Rikishi and Rico won the match and became the WWE Tag Team Champions. Rico would later cause Rikishi to lose the titles back to Billy and Chuck in a rematch on the June 6 episode of SmackDown!.

In early 2002, Hulk Hogan was booked to face Rikishi in Hogan's first match back since leaving the WWF to go to rival WCW in the 1990s. Hogan won the match, but Rikishi was able to deliver a Stink Face to Hogan after the conclusion of the match.

Rikishi was not featured much in late 2002 and early 2003. He feuded with John Cena, Bill DeMott, and The Full Blooded Italians on SmackDown!. The return of Roddy Piper led Rikishi to challenge him as Piper had hit Jimmy Snuka with a coconut years ago on Piper's Pit. At Backlash on April 27, Piper's protege Sean O'Haire defeated Rikishi after Piper got hit with a coconut by Rikishi giving O'Haire time to hit the Widowmaker on Rikishi. Rikishi eventually formed a tag team with Scotty 2 Hotty, and the duo defeated the Basham Brothers for the WWE Tag Team Championship on the February 5, 2004 episode of SmackDown!, holding them for two and a half months before losing them to Charlie Haas and Rico on the April 22 episode of SmackDown!. Fatu, however, was released by WWE on July 16, for not following up with clearance from an injury that had him out of action since the April 22 SmackDown!.

=== Later career (2004–2019) ===
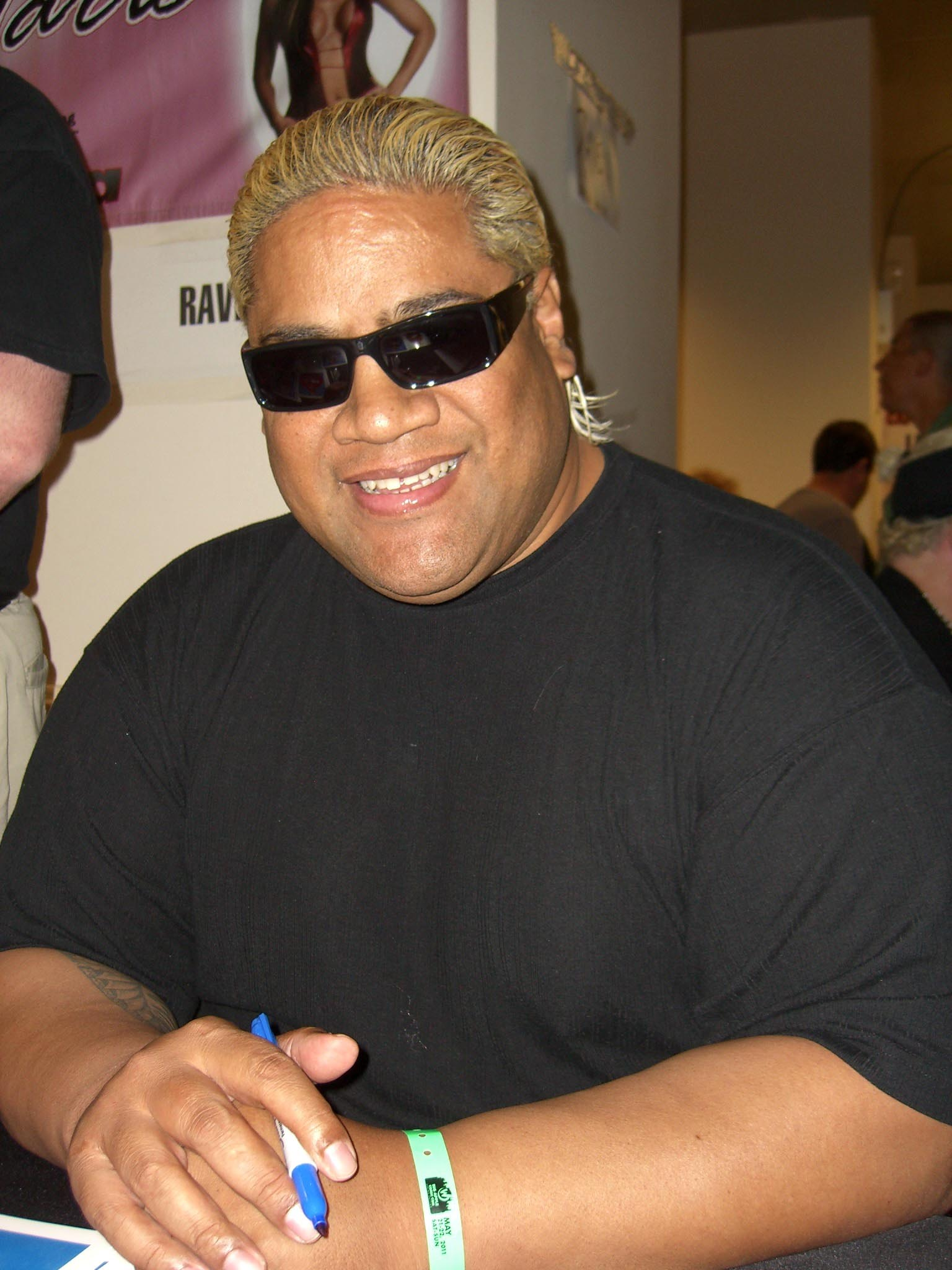
Rikishi in 2011

After WWE, Fatu continued to wrestle on the independent circuit. In October 2005, he shortened his ring name to Kishi after being notified by WWE legal representatives that WWE owned a trademark on the name "Rikishi". Fatu, as Kishi, would go on to work for Nu-Wrestling Evolution, a professional wrestling promotion based in Turin Italy. On February 17, 2007, Fatu competed as SUMO RIKISHI in a tag team contest at an All Japan Pro Wrestling event, as he was brought in by Keiji Mutoh to feud with Akebono. On August 12, 2007, Fatu competed in an 8-man tag, as Rikishi, at AAA's TripleMania event. On August 23, Fatu competed in a Triple Threat match against Samoa Joe and Sterling James Keenan at Ballpark Brawl VIII in Buffalo, New York. On November 17, wrestling as Rikishi once again, Fatu defeated Mike Rollins at a Heavy on Wrestling event in Duluth, Minnesota.

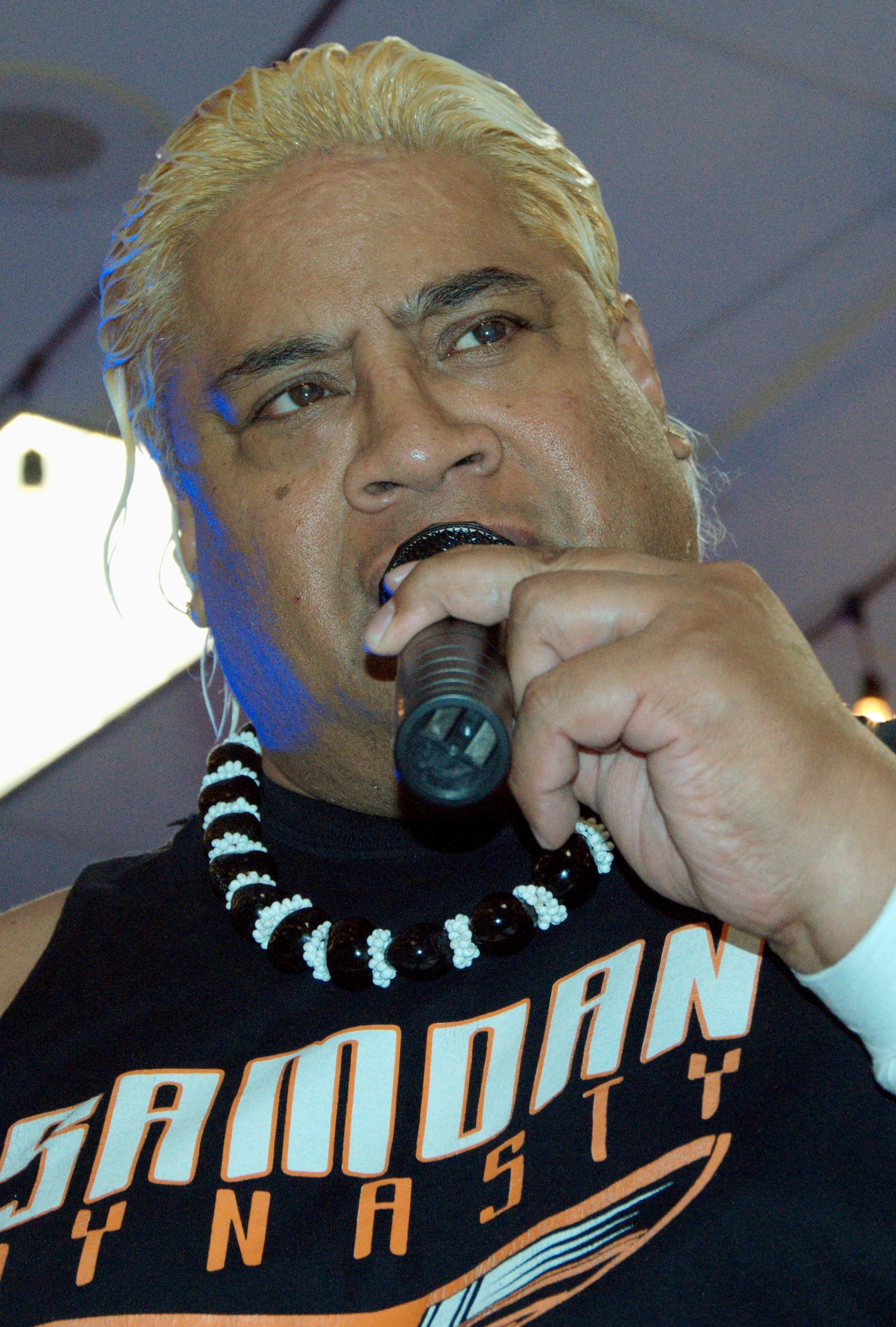
Rikishi in 2018

His recent match was on March 23, 2019, Grind City Wrestling in Memphis, Tennessee at halftime of the Memphis Grizzlies vs. Minnesota Timberwolves NBA game teaming with Jerry Lawler to defeat The Steiner Brothers (Rick Steiner and Scott Steiner) for the inaugural GCW Tag Team Championship.

=== Total Nonstop Action Wrestling (2007) ===
On the September 13, 2007 episode of Impact!, Fatu debuted in Total Nonstop Action Wrestling under the ring name Junior Fatu. On the September 20 episode of Impact!, Fatu lost to Christian Cage in his first match due to a distraction by Christian's partner A.J. Styles. On the October 4 episode of Impact!, Fatu, Samoa Joe and The Latin American Xchange defeated Christian, Styles, Senshi and Christopher Daniels. On the October 11 episode of Impact!, Fatu and LAX lost a six-man tag team match to Kurt Angle and Team 3D. At Bound for Glory, Fatu competed in the Fight for the Right Reverse Battle Royal which was won by Eric Young. On the October 25 episode of Impact!, Fatu defeated Robert Roode in a Fight for the Right Tournament match after interference by Samoa Joe. On October 30, however, it was reported that Fatu had been released from TNA, because he and TNA management failed to reach an agreement about a pay raise. Chris Harris took Fatu's spot in the Fight for the Right semi-final match.

=== Sporadic WWE appearances and Hall of Famer (2012–2020) ===
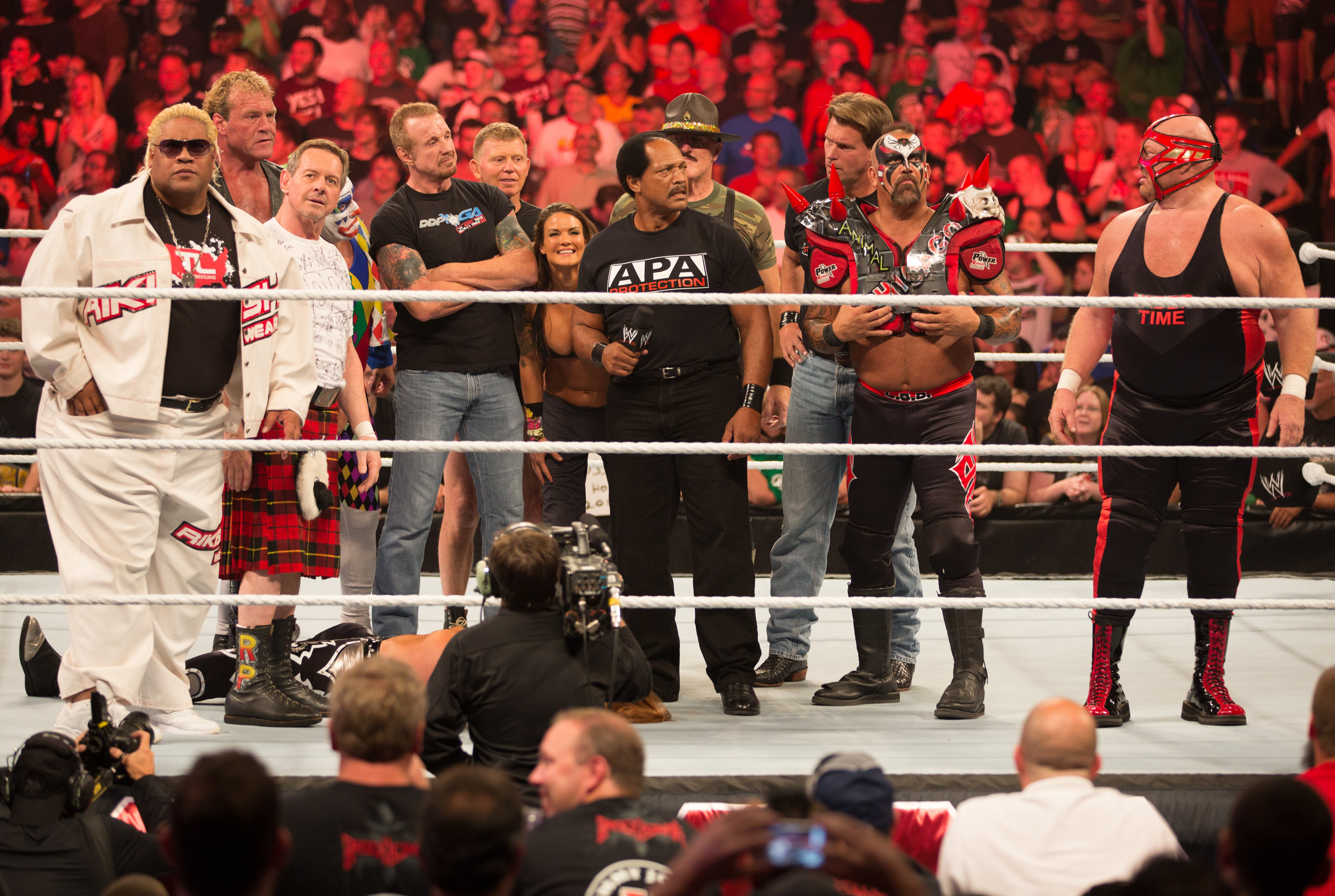
Rikishi (far left), as one of Heath Slater's veteran conquerors at Raw 1000

Rikishi appeared with his family at the 2012 WWE Hall of Fame ceremony to induct his cousin Yokozuna. He then made an in-ring appearance on Raw on July 16, 2012, defeating Heath Slater. During the match, he used the Samoan Spike and the Banzai Drop (the latter having been used as a finishing move since his 1999 repackaging as Rikishi) as a tribute to his deceased brother Umaga and cousin Yokozuna, respectively. After the match, he danced with his sons Jimmy Uso and Jey Uso. He then reappeared on the 1,000th episode on July 23 with other Legends to help Lita take down Slater.

Rikishi next appeared on the January 6, 2014 episode of Raw, where he reunited with Too Cool to defeat 3MB in a six-man tag team match.

On the February 9, 2015 episode of Raw, Rikishi was announced as the newest member to be inducted into the WWE Hall of Fame Class of 2015. His sons, who wrestle as Jimmy and Jey Uso, inducted him into the Hall of Fame on March 28, 2015.

Rikishi appeared on WWE for the Raw Reunion show on July 22, 2019.

On November 22, 2020, he made an appearance at Survivor Series during The Undertaker's retirement ceremony.

== Other media ==
Rikishi is a playable DLC character in the Attitude Era-themed video game WWE '13. He also appeared in WWF SmackDown! 2: Know Your Role, WWF SmackDown! Just Bring It, WWE SmackDown! Shut Your Mouth, WWE SmackDown! Here Comes the Pain, WWE 2K16, WWE 2K17, WWE 2K18, WWE 2K19, WWE 2K22, WWE 2K23, WWE 2K24, WWE 2K25 and WWE 2K26. Outside of the main series, he is featured in WWF No Mercy, WWF Raw, WWE Raw 2, WWE WrestleMania X8 and WWE WrestleMania XIX.

Fatu appeared in the Italian comedy film Natale a Miami. He also guest starred on the Nickelodeon show Victorious, as a sumo wrestler in the episode "Brain Squeezers."

Fatu appeared in the Netflix original film Sandy Wexler.

Fatu appeared in "The Big Party" episode of The Big Show Show.

Fatu under his "Rikishi" ring name is the Samoan judge in the "Wall Of The World" on the CBS show The World's Best.

Fatu appeared in the film Kingdom of Gladiators: The Tournament along with his nephew Jacob Fatu

== Personal life ==
Fatu is a member of the Anoaʻi family, who had a presence in professional wrestling since the mid-twentieth century. He is the Twin brother of Sam "Tonga Kid" Fatu and Older brother of Eddie "Umaga" Fatu. Fatu's uncles Sika Anoaʻi and Afa Anoaʻi wrestled as The Wild Samoans. Many of his cousins wrestled including: Rodney "Yokozuna" Anoaʻi, Afa “Manu" Anoa’i Jr., Samula "Samu" Anoaʻi, Matt "Rosey" Anoaʻi, Joe "Roman Reigns" Anoaʻi, Lance Anoaʻi, and Lloyd "L.A. Smooth" Anoaʻi. His father, Solofa Fatu Sr., died of complications related to COVID-19 on October 4, 2020.

Fatu and his wife Talisua Fuavai-Fatu have eight children, seven sons and one daughter including Joseph Yokozuna and fraternal twins Joshua Samuel and Jonathan Solofa. Joshua Samuel, Jonathan Solofa and Joseph Yokozuna are currently signed to WWE where Joshua performs on the Raw brand and Jonathan and Joseph perform on the Smackdown brand as Jey Uso, Jimmy Uso, and Solo Sikoa, respectively. His third son, Jeremiah, appeared on an episode of Raw in December 1997 and has kept out of the industry since. His fourth son, Thamiko, made his professional wrestling debut in 2023 competing under his real name.

=== Business ventures ===
Rikishi is co-owner of Knokx Pro Wrestling Academy, along with Reno Anoa’i.

== Championships and accomplishments ==
- Lutte Internationale
  - Canadian International Television Championship (1 time)
- Northern States Wrestling Alliance
  - NSWA Tag Team Championship (1 time) - with Samu
- Portland Wrestling
  - Portland Pacific Northwest Heavyweight Championship (1 time)
- Power Pro Wrestling (Memphis)
  - Power Pro Wrestling Heavyweight Championship (1 time)
- Pro Wrestling Illustrated
  - Comeback of the Year (2000)
  - Ranked No. 27 of the top 500 singles wrestlers in the PWI 500 in 2000
  - Ranked No. 347 of the top 500 singles wrestlers of the PWI Years in 2003
- Revolución Lucha Libre
  - Campeonato Internacional Absoluto (5 times)
- Universal Wrestling Association
  - UWA World Trios Championship (1 time) – with Kokina Maximus and The Samoan Savage
- World Class Wrestling Association
  - WCWA Texas Tag Team Championship (1 time) – with Samu
  - WCWA World Tag Team Championship (3 times) – with Samu
- World Wrestling Council
  - WWC Caribbean Tag Team Championship (1 time) – with Samu
- World Wrestling Federation/Entertainment/WWE
  - WWF Intercontinental Championship (1 time)
  - World Tag Team Championship (2 times) – with Samu (1) and Rico (1)
  - WWE Tag Team Championship (1 time) – with Scotty 2 Hotty
  - WWE Hall of Fame (Class of 2015)
  - Slammy Award for Best Etiquette (1994) – with Samu
- Wrestling Observer Newsletter
  - Worst Worked Match of the Year (1993) with Samu, Bastion Booger, and Bam Bam Bigelow vs. The Bushwhackers and Men on a Mission at Survivor Series
