= Survivor Series: WarGames (2026) =

WWE premium live event

- Promotional poster featuring The Bloodline and The 946
- Promotion: WWE
- Brand(s): Raw; SmackDown
- Date: November 28, 2026
- City: Houston, Texas
- Venue: Daikin Park

WWE event chronology
← Previous; Crown Jewel	Next → Wrestlepalooza

Survivor Series chronology
← Previous; 2025	Next → —

The 2026 Survivor Series: WarGames, also promoted as Survivor Series: WarGames Houston, is an upcoming professional wrestling premium live event (PLE) produced by the American company WWE, to be held for wrestlers from the promotion's main roster brands, Raw and SmackDown, as well as Mexican sister promotion Lucha Libre AAA Worldwide (AAA). It will be the 40th annual Survivor Series event, and the fifth annual branded as "WarGames", and is scheduled to take place during Thanksgiving weekend on Saturday, November 28, 2026, at Daikin Park in Houston, Texas. This will be the second Survivor Series to be held in Houston, after 2017. The event will also celebrate the 30th anniversary of Dwayne "The Rock" Johnson's debut at the 1996 Survivor Series.

The event will center on the WarGames match, a type of roofless steel cage match that surrounds two rings placed side by side and is contested by teams of multiple wrestlers; the first team to score a pinfall or submission wins while escaping the cage is a forfeit. This will also mark the first time that the event will feature the titular Survivor Series match.

== Production ==
=== Background ===
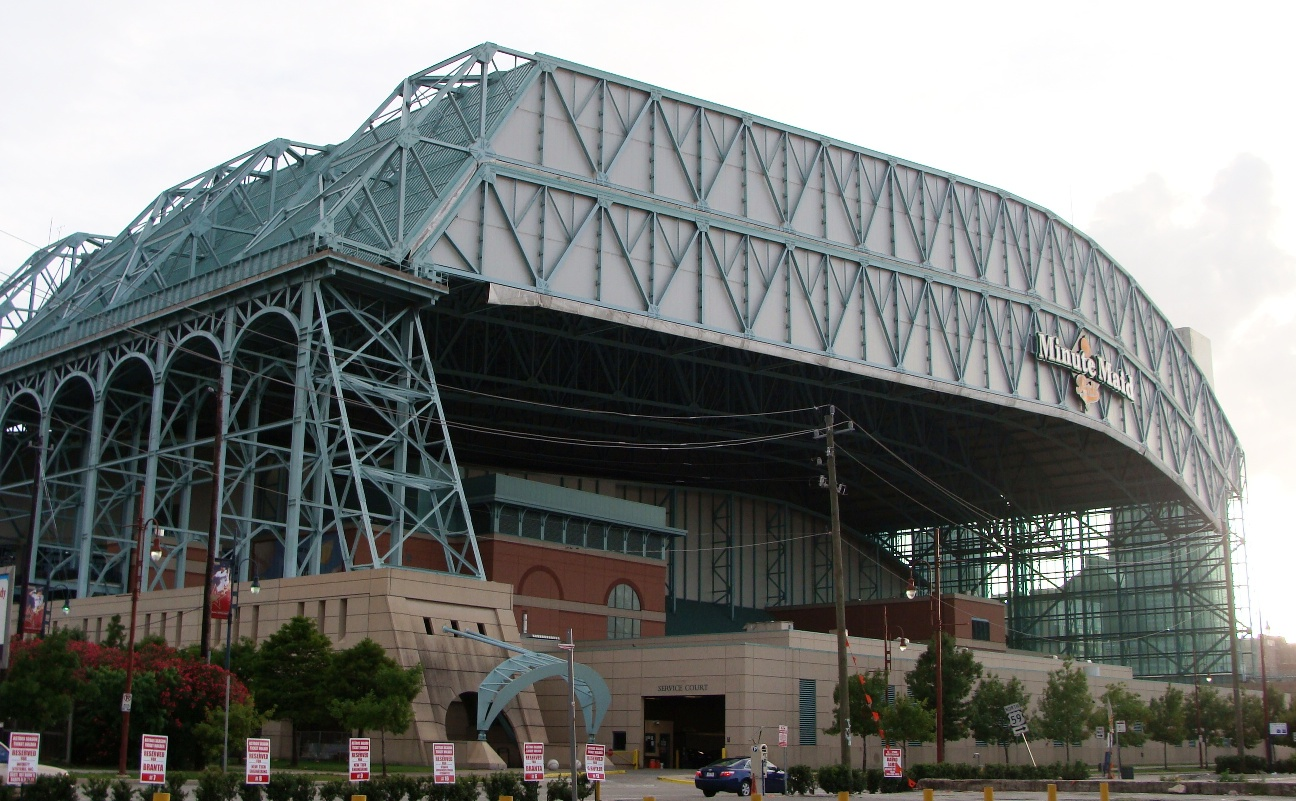
The 40th annual Survivor Series event will be held in Houston, Texas at Daikin Park (pictured in 2008 under its previous name of Minute Maid Park).

Survivor Series is an annual professional wrestling premium live event (PLE), produced every November by the American company WWE since 1987, generally held around Thanksgiving in the United States. It was originally broadcast exclusively via pay-per-view (PPV) before it began simulcasting on WWE's livestreaming platforms in 2014. In what has become the second longest-running PPV event in history (behind WWE's WrestleMania), it is one of the promotion's original four PPVs, along with WrestleMania, SummerSlam, and Royal Rumble, referred to as the "Big Four", and as of August 2021, it is considered one of the "Big Five", along with Money in the Bank.

From 1987 to 2021, the event was characterized by having Survivor Series matches, which were tag team elimination matches that typically featured teams of four or five wrestlers against each other. Beginning in 2022, the event no longer featured any Survivor Series matches and instead became based around the WarGames match with the event titled "Survivor Series: WarGames". The WarGames match is a type of roofless steel cage match that surrounds two rings placed side by side. It is contested by two or three teams composed of three to six members each. One member from each team starts in the cage, and every couple of minutes, another team member enters in a staggered format until all participants have entered. Once all participants are in the cage, the match officially begins and the first team to score a pinfall or submission wins, while escaping the cage is a forfeit.

Announced on July 13, 2026, the 40th Survivor Series event, and fifth annual as WarGames, was scheduled for Saturday, November 28, 2026, at Daikin Park in Houston, Texas, with the event promoted as Survivor Series: WarGames Houston. It will be the second consecutive Survivor Series event to be held in a stadium, and it will be held for wrestlers from the promotion's Raw and SmackDown brand divisions. This will subsequently be the second Survivor Series in Houston, after 2017 at the Toyota Center, while Daikin Park, then known as Minute Maid Park, previously hosted the 2020 Royal Rumble. Tickets went on sale on August 7. As part of Survivor Series: WarGames weekend, WWE will have a merchandise store at Houston's George R. Brown Convention Center, open from Friday, November 27 through Sunday, November 29.

The event will coincide with the 30th anniversary of Dwayne "The Rock" Johnson's debut at the 1996 Survivor Series. In early November, WWE began posting on their social media to celebrate the milestone. Subsequently on November 18 on The Pat McAfee Show, The Rock announced that he would be making an appearance at Survivor Series: WarGames, which will be his first on-screen appearance since Elimination Chamber in March 2025.

=== Broadcast outlets ===
Survivor Series: WarGames will be available on traditional PPV outlets worldwide. It will also be available to livestream on ESPN Unlimited in the United States, SuperSport in Sub-Saharan Africa, and Netflix everywhere else.

=== Storylines ===
The event will involve matches that result from scripted storylines. Results are predetermined by WWE's writers on the Raw and SmackDown brands, while storylines are produced on WWE's weekly television shows, Monday Night Raw and Friday Night SmackDown.

On November 6 during an appearance on the What's Your Story? with Stephanie McMahon podcast, Raw wrestler and the General Manager of WWE's Mexican sister promotion Lucha Libre AAA Worldwide (AAA), Rey Mysterio, announced a 5-on-5 traditional Survivor Series elimination match between Team USA and Team Mexico at Survivor Series: WarGames, marking the first Survivor Series elimination match to be held at a Survivor Series event since 2021. Later that night, Mysterio also announced that he would lead Team Mexico. A day later on the Crown Jewel Post-show, SmackDown's Cody Rhodes proposed to lead Team USA, which was subsequently confirmed two nights later on Raw. Also on that night's episode, SmackDown's CM Punk made a surprise appearance and proposed to be the second member and the co-captain of Team USA, which Rhodes agreed. Later that night, Mysterio invited one-half of Raw's World Tag Team Champions, Penta, to be the second member of Team Mexico, which he accepted, while Rhodes invited Penta's championship partner Je'Von Evans to join Team USA, to which he accepted. Four days later on SmackDown, SmackDown wrestler and AAA World Cruiserweight Champion Rey Fénix joined Team Mexico. The following week on Raw, Raw's LA Knight was added as the fourth member of Team USA and kept his spot by defeating The Miz, while Mysterio revealed Raw's Dragon Lee as the fourth member of Team Mexico. On the November 20 episode of SmackDown, Punk announced that WWE Hall of Famer "Hacksaw" Jim Duggan was selected as the fifth member of Team USA, to which Rhodes reluctantly agreed. Duggan immediately declined after Punk showed a scouting tape of Team Mexico. After that, Trick Williams came out and stated that as SmackDown's reigning United States Champion, he should be on Team USA and was accepted by Punk and Rhodes. However, during Williams's match against Damian Priest, the latter (kayfabe) injured Williams's knee, leaving the fifth spot on Team USA vacant.

Since September, The Bloodline (Roman Reigns, Jacob Fatu, Solo Sikoa, Jey Uso, and Jimmy Uso) had been feuding with The 946 (Royce Keys, Bronco Nima, Lucien Price, Carmelo Hayes, and Cruz Montana) after Keys, Nima, and Price attacked and abducted Sikoa on the September 21 episode of Raw, taking him out of his scheduled Money in the Bank qualifying match. At the Money in the Bank event following Reigns's successful World Heavyweight Championship defense, The 946 brawled with Sikoa and The Usos (Jey and Jimmy) until The 946's Jaida Parker took The 946 to safety. On the following Raw, a six-man tag team match took place which ended in a no-contest when Parker attacked the referee. Afterwards, Hayes appeared and struck Sikoa with a crowbar, joining The 946. The following week, another brawl between the teams broke out, with Reigns joining The Bloodline in the process. On the November 2 episode during a match between Sikoa and Keys, Sikoa won via disqualification after being attacked by The 946. Reigns appeared and it seemed as if The Bloodline would gain the upper hand, however, a masked man turned the tides for The 946 and revealed himself to be Montana, making his main roster debut from NXT. The following week, Reigns and Keys had a conversation while the rest of The Bloodline set The 946's box truck on fire backstage. After the two teams engaged in another brawl with The Bloodline gaining the upper hand, it was made official that they would meet in a WarGames match. On the November 16 episode of Raw, Hayes and Montana defeated The Usos to give The 946 the WarGames advantage.

On the August 3 episode of Raw, Women's World Champion Liv Morgan was confronted by a returning Becky Lynch, who wanted a shot at the title. During WWE's South America Live Tour on September 12, Morgan lost the title with Lynch serving as the special guest referee. On the October 5 episode of Raw, Lynch and Morgan were scheduled for a match to determine the #1 contender for the title at Money in the Bank, but ended in a no-contest. At Money in the Bank, Morgan regained the title in a triple threat match also involving Lynch. On the October 26 episode of Raw, Lynch won in a title match against Morgan via disqualification after interference from Judgment Day (Raquel Rodriguez and Roxanne Perez). Two weeks later, Lynch's team defeated Rodriguez and Perez in a tag team match. Afterwards, Lynch challenged Morgan to a "fair fight" for the title, and Raw General Manager Adam Pearce scheduled the match for Survivor Series: WarGames.

On the April 24 episode of SmackDown, NXT's Fatal Influence (Jacy Jayne, Fallon Henley, and Lainey Reid) made their main roster debut by attacking Charlotte Flair and Alexa Bliss during a WWE Women's Tag Team Championship match. On the May 8 episode of SmackDown, Fatal Influence defeated the team of Flair and Bliss in a six-woman tag team match, where they were later attacked by Jade Cargill, B-Fab, and Michin. Flair would cost Cargill title matches at Clash in Italy and Night of Champions. On the July 10 episode of SmackDown, Cargill deliberately injured Bliss's left arm with a steel chair after defeating her, taking Bliss out of action indefinitely. At Saturday Night's Main Event XLV, Henley and Reid won the WWE Women's Tag Team Championship. On the August 7 episode of SmackDown, Bliss returned with Tatum Paxley, who was also called up to the main roster, to attack B-Fab and Michin, helping Flair defeat Cargill. On the October 9 episode of SmackDown, Bliss and Paxley defeated Henley and Reid to win the WWE Women's Tag Team Championship; Bliss substituted for Flair after Flair was attacked backstage by Cargill's team prior to the match. Two weeks later on SmackDown, B-Fab and Michin defeated Bliss and Paxley for the title. On the November 2 episode of Raw, Cargill, B-Fab, and Michin were confronted by Bayley, which ended in a backstage attack. On that week's SmackDown, Flair returned to assist Bliss, Paxley, and Bayley, who brawled against Fatal Influence, Cargill, B-Fab, and Michin. Two days later on Raw, Fatal Influence and Cargill's team joined forces following their attack on the four women. On SmackDown later that week, Stephanie Vaquer helped Flair's team to fend off Fatal Influence and Cargill's team. Subsequently, Flair, Bliss, Paxley, Bayley, and Vaquer challenged Fatal Influence, Cargill, B-Fab, and Michin to a WarGames match, which was subsequently made official, with B-Fab sitting out as the match had been scheduled as a five-on-five match. On the November 20 episode of SmackDown, Cargill defeated Flair to give their team the WarGames advantage.

== Matches ==
No.	Matches*	Stipulations
1	Team USA (Cody Rhodes, CM Punk, Je'Von Evans, LA Knight, and one TBA) vs. Team Mexico (Rey Mysterio, Penta, Rey Fénix, Dragon Lee, and one TBA)	5-on-5 Survivor Series match
2	Liv Morgan (c) vs. Becky Lynch	Singles match for the Women's World Championship
3	The Bloodline (Roman Reigns, Jacob Fatu, Jey Uso, Jimmy Uso, and Solo Sikoa) vs. The 946 (Royce Keys, Bronco Nima, Carmelo Hayes, Cruz Montana, and Lucien Price) (with Jaida Parker)	Men's WarGames match
4	Charlotte Flair, Stephanie Vaquer, Alexa Bliss, Tatum Paxley, and Bayley vs. Fatal Influence (Jacy Jayne, Fallon Henley, and Lainey Reid), Jade Cargill, and Michin (with B-Fab)	Women's WarGames match
(c) / – the champion(s) heading into the match; *Card subject to change
