= Money in the Bank (2026) =

WWE premium live event

- Promotional poster featuring Trick Williams, CM Punk, Tiffany Stratton, Penta, and Sol Ruca
- Promotion: WWE
- Brand(s): Raw; SmackDown
- Date: October 10, 2026
- City: New Orleans, Louisiana
- Venue: Smoothie King Center
- Attendance: 12,935

WWE event chronology
← Previous; Worlds Collide	Next → NXT Halloween Havoc

Money in the Bank chronology
← Previous; 2025	Next → —

The 2026 Money in the Bank, also promoted as Money in the Bank: New Orleans, was a professional wrestling premium live event (PLE) produced by WWE, held for wrestlers from the promotion's main roster brands, Raw and SmackDown. It was the 17th annual Money in the Bank event and took place on Saturday, October 10, 2026, at the Smoothie King Center in New Orleans, Louisiana. The event centered on the Money in the Bank ladder match, a multi-person ladder match where the wrestlers compete to retrieve a briefcase hanging above the ring which contains a contract for a guaranteed championship match at any time within the next year.

Five matches were contested at the event. In the main event, Raw's Penta won the men's Money in the Bank ladder match, while earlier on the card, SmackDown's Tiffany Stratton won the women's ladder match. In the other matches at the event, Liv Morgan defeated defending champion Stephanie Vaquer and Becky Lynch in a triple threat match to win Raw's Women's World Championship, Oba Femi defeated Bronson Reed, and in the opening bout, Roman Reigns defeated LA Knight to retain Raw's World Heavyweight Championship.

The event was originally scheduled for August 29, but was then pushed back to September 6 before it was pushed back a final time to October 10. The change to October was reportedly due to a scheduling conflict with broadcast partners as well as conflicts with WWE's touring dates in September. This was in turn the latest calendar date for a Money in the Bank event, as well as the first to take place after SummerSlam, as the event is usually held between May and July before SummerSlam. This was also the first Money in the Bank to livestream on ESPN Unlimited in the United States. Critics gave the event mostly positive grades.

== Production ==
=== Background ===
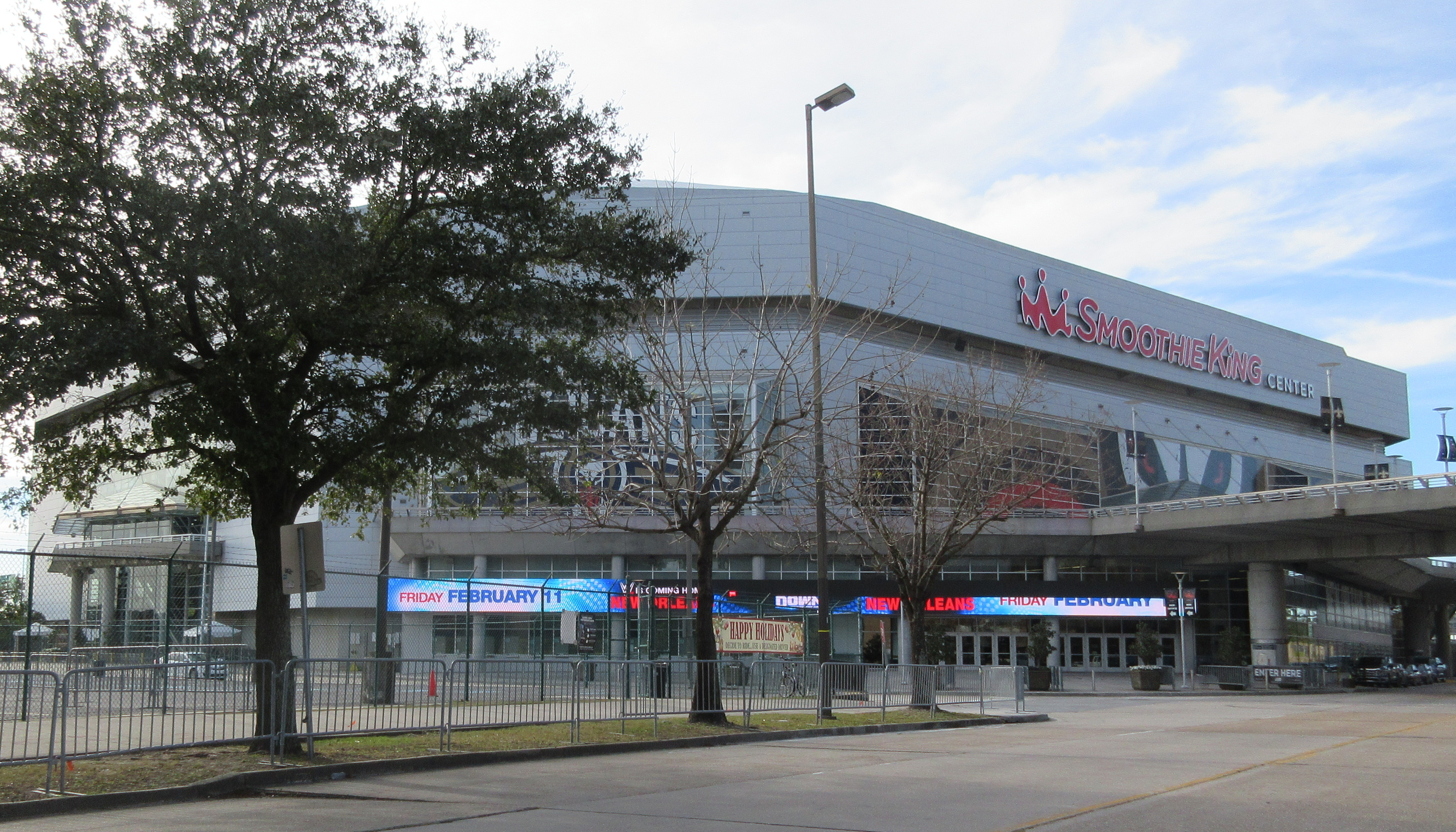
The 17th annual Money in the Bank event was held at the Smoothie King Center in New Orleans, Louisiana.

Money in the Bank is an annual professional wrestling premium live event (PLE) produced by WWE since 2010, generally held between May and July. It was originally broadcast exclusively via pay-per-view (PPV) before it began simulcasting on WWE's livestreaming platforms in 2014. As of August 2021, it is considered one of the promotion's five biggest PLEs of the year, along with WrestleMania, Royal Rumble, SummerSlam, and Survivor Series, referred to as the "Big Five". The concept of the event comes from WWE's established Money in the Bank ladder match.

New Orleans, Louisiana was originally set to host WrestleMania 42 in April 2026, but in May 2025, it was revealed that these plans had changed. This came as part of a larger agreement with New Orleans, in which the city would instead host a future WrestleMania as well as the 2026 Money in the Bank, which would subsequently be promoted as Money in the Bank: New Orleans. The following day, WWE Chief Content Officer Paul "Triple H" Levesque confirmed the date for the 17th Money in the Bank as Saturday, August 29, 2026. However, the date would be pushed back twice, first to Sunday, September 6, with the venue confirmed as the Smoothie King Center, before it was pushed back again to Saturday, October 10 at the same venue, with Sunday Night's Main Event instead taking place on September 6 at the State Farm Arena in Atlanta, Georgia.

Fightful Select reported that the change to October was due to a scheduling conflict with broadcast partners, while Bryan Alvarez of Wrestling Observer Figure Four Online said it was more so due to conflicts with WWE's touring dates in September as production trucks could not get to New Orleans in time. This was subsequently the first Money in the Bank to take place in October, which also made it the latest calendar date for the event, as well as the first to take place after SummerSlam. As part of Money in the Bank weekend, WWE had a merchandise store at the Smoothie King Center open from Thursday, October 8 through the end of the PLE itself on Saturday. "A Milli" by Lil Wayne was the official theme song for the event.

The Money in the Bank ladder match features multiple wrestlers using ladders to retrieve a briefcase hanging above the ring. The briefcase contains a contract that guarantees the winner a match for a championship at any time within the next year. The 2026 event featured wrestlers from the Raw and SmackDown brand divisions; male wrestlers competed for a contract to grant them a match for a championship of their choosing, while female wrestlers competed for a contract to challenge for their choice of either Raw's Women's World Championship or SmackDown's WWE Women's Championship.

=== Broadcast outlets ===
Money in the Bank was broadcast on traditional PPV outlets worldwide. It was also available to livestream on ESPN Unlimited in the United States, SuperSport in Sub-Saharan Africa, and Netflix everywhere else. This marked the first Money in the Bank to livestream on ESPN's app in the United States, as WWE's contract with Peacock to air main roster PLEs expired at the conclusion of Clash in Paris in August 2025.

=== Storylines ===
The event included five matches that resulted from scripted storylines. Results were predetermined by WWE's writers on the Raw and SmackDown brands, while storylines were produced on WWE's weekly television programs, Monday Night Raw and Friday Night SmackDown.

Qualifying matches for the men's Money in the Bank ladder match consisted of six triple threat matches held across episodes of Raw and SmackDown, with three spots for each brand. The first spot was determined on the September 7 episode of Raw where Bron Breakker defeated Ethan Page and Rey Mysterio. Qualifiers continued on the following episode where Je'Von Evans earned the second spot by defeating Austin Theory and Big Cass. The third spot was determined on that week's SmackDown, where Trick Williams defeated Randy Orton and Rey Fénix. The fourth spot was determined on the September 21 episode of Raw; originally, Solo Sikoa was set to participate in the match, however, The 946 (Royce Keys, Bronco Nima, and Lucien Price) attacked and abducted Sikoa. Raw General Manager Adam Pearce announced Penta as Sikoa's replacement, who went on to defeat Dominik Mysterio and Dragon Lee to qualify. The fifth spot was determined on that week's SmackDown where CM Punk defeated Gunther and Finn Bálor. The final spot was determined on the following week's SmackDown, where Kevin Owens defeated Cody Rhodes and Johnny Gargano.

Qualifying matches for the women's Money in the Bank ladder match also consisted of six triple threat matches held across episodes of Raw and SmackDown, with three spots for each brand. The first spot was determined on the September 7 episode of Raw where Sol Ruca defeated Lyra Valkyria and Maxxine Dupri. Qualifiers continued on the following episode where Lola Vice earned the second spot by defeating Kelani Jordan and Raquel Rodriguez. The third spot was determined on that week's SmackDown, where Jacy Jayne defeated Alexa Bliss and Jade Cargill. The fourth spot was determined on the September 21 episode of Raw where Roxanne Perez defeated Iyo Sky and La Catalina. The fifth spot was determined on that week's SmackDown where Lash Legend defeated Charlotte Flair and Giulia. The final spot was determined on the following week's SmackDown where Tiffany Stratton defeated Candice LeRae and Tatum Paxley.

On the August 3 episode of Raw, as Roman Reigns celebrated his successful World Heavyweight Championship defense at SummerSlam, he was interrupted by LA Knight who wanted a title opportunity. Reigns denied Knight's challenge and stated that he was sick of giving opportunities to non-deserving people. Later that night, Lucha Libre AAA Worldwide General Manager Rey Mysterio proposed something to Reigns, which was later announced as a tournament where the winner would face Reigns for the title on the September 14 episode of Raw in Mexico City. Penta won the tournament, however, at the show, Reigns retained the title. Following the match and after Raw went off air, Knight came to the ring and attacked Reigns with a BFT. Reigns subsequently accepted to face Knight for the title at Money in the Bank and the match was made official. On October 9, it was announced that the match would open the show.

After Oba Femi defeated Brock Lesnar at Night 1 of SummerSlam, Femi started being referred to as the future of WWE, which upset The Vision's Bron Breakker. After some confrontations, a match between both men was scheduled for Sunday Night's Main Event, where Femi defeated Breakker by disqualification after interference from a returning Bronson Reed, who viciously attacked Femi. On the following Raw, The Vision (Breakker, Reed, Austin Theory, and Logan Paul) attacked Femi, sidelining him for a few weeks. On the September 21 episode, Femi returned and fended off The Vision. The following week, Femi revealed a contract for a match between him and Reed at Money in the Bank, with his signature already on the contract. Femi called out Reed, who accepted the challenge and signed the contract.

At Night 1 of WrestleMania 42, Liv Morgan defeated Stephanie Vaquer to win the Women's World Championship. Afterwards on the April 27 episode of Raw, Morgan's stablemates in the The Judgment Day (Raquel Rodriguez and Roxanne Perez) attacked Vaquer, sidelining her for months. After interfering in Perez's match on the August 3 episode of Raw, Morgan was confronted by a returning Becky Lynch, who wanted a shot at the title, turning face in the process. Vaquer returned afterwards and attacked Morgan in the ring before having a staredown with Lynch, also signaling her intentions for the title. Vaquer was granted a rematch for the title on the September 7 episode where despite Lynch trying to help Vaquer, Morgan retained the title against Vaquer after inference from Rodriguez and Perez. However, five days later during WWE's South America Live Tour, Vaquer defeated Morgan to win the title in a match that featured Lynch as the special guest referee. On the October 5 episode of Raw, Lynch and Morgan were scheduled for a match to determine the #1 contender for the title at Money in the Bank, however, after Vaquer appeared to fend off Perez and Rodriguez, both Morgan and Lynch accidentally hit Vaquer, which prompted Vaquer to attack both women, with the match ending in a no-contest. Vaquer called out Raw General Manager Adam Pearce and demanded to defend the title against Lynch and Morgan in a triple threat match at Money in the Bank, which Pearce agreed.

== Event ==
Other on-screen personnel
Role:	Name:
English commentators	Michael Cole
English commentators	Corey Graves
Spanish commentators	Marcelo Rodríguez
Spanish commentators	Jerry Soto
Ring announcer	Byron Saxton
Referees	Danilo Anfibio
Referees	Jason Ayers
Referees	Adrian Butler
Referees	Jessika Carr
Referees	Dan Engler
Referees	Daphanie LaShaunn
Referees	Eddie Orengo
Referees	Ryan Tran
Interviewers	Cathy Kelley
Interviewers	Byron Saxton
Interviewers	Chuey Martinez
Interviewers	Corey Graves
Interviewers	Jackie Redmond
Pre-show panel	Big E
Pre-show panel	Peter Rosenberg

=== Preliminary matches ===
The PLE began with Roman Reigns defending the World Heavyweight Championship against LA Knight. During the match, Knight and Reigns fought at ringside. Reigns threw Knight back in the ring where Knight performed an Elbow Drop on Reigns for a nearfall. Reigns performed a Superman Punch on Knight for a nearfall. After Knight avoided a Spear attempt, he attempted a Superplex on Reigns, who countered. Knight eventually performed the Superplex and performed a Burning Hammer on Reigns for a nearfall. After attempting a BFT on Reigns, Knight performed a reverse DDT on Reigns. Reigns performed a Uranage slam on Knight for a nearfall. At ringside, Reigns attempted to put Knight through an announce table, however, Knight shoved Reigns into the ring steps. The two exchanged punches and both ran into the ring to break the referee's count. Back inside, Reigns performed a Superman Punch on Knight. Knight performed a BFT on Reigns for a nearfall. Reigns performed a Spear on Knight for a nearfall. Knight then performed his own Spear on Reigns for yet another nearfall. At ringside, Reigns performed a Superman Punch on Knight. Reigns attempted a Spear on Knight, however, Knight sidestepped Reigns, sending him into the timekeeper's area. Knight performed a Powerbomb on Reigns through the announce table. Knight performed a top-rope Elbow Drop on Reigns for a nearfall. In the end, Knight attempted another BFT, however, Reigns countered and performed two Superman Punches and a Spear on Knight to retain the title. Following the match, The 946 (Royce Keys, Bronco Nima, and Lucien Price) appeared in the crowd, followed by Solo Sikoa, Jey Uso, and Jimmy Uso appearing behind them. The two teams brawled in the catering area and outside the arena until Jaida Parker showed up in an SUV and The 946 scurried away.

Next, the women's Money in the Bank ladder match was contested which featured Sol Ruca, Lola Vice, and Roxanne Perez from Raw and Tiffany Stratton, Jacy Jayne, and Lash Legend from SmackDown. During the match, Stratton performed a Swanton Bomb off a ladder onto the other competitors, and the back of Stratton's head came in direct contact with the padded floor. In the closing moments, Perez performed a Pop Rox on Stratton and ascended the ladder before Ruca performed a Sol Snatcher on Perez. Legend then threw Ruca onto a ladder and ascended the ladder where Stratton showed up and struck Legend with the briefcase and unhooked the briefcase to win the match.

After that, Oba Femi faced Bronson Reed. During the match, Reed's Vision stablemates, Austin Theory and Maxxine Dupri, appeared to distract Femi, only for fellow member, Logan Paul to interfere. While the referee ejected Paul from ringside. Theory handed brass knuckles to Reed who struck Femi twice before performing the Tsunami for a nearfall. In the end, Reed performed a Death Valley Driver on Femi and attempted a Moonsault, however, Femi evaded and performed a Chokeslam on Theory onto the ring apron before performing a Fall from Grace on Reed to win the match.

In the penultimate match, Stephanie Vaquer defended Raw's Women's World Championship against Liv Morgan and Becky Lynch in a triple threat match. During the match, Vaquer and Lynch applied a half crab and the Disarmher, respectively, on Morgan, before arguing and trading headbutts. Lynch performed a Manhandle Slam on Morgan, but Vaquer broke up the pin. Vaquer was able to momentarily take out Lynch and was closing in on the win on Morgan when Lynch pulled the referee out of the ring. Afterwards, Lynch and Vaquer focused on each other, ending with Vaquer kicking Lynch off the apron onto a table outside ring. Morgan then performed Oblivion on Vaquer to win the title.

=== Main event ===
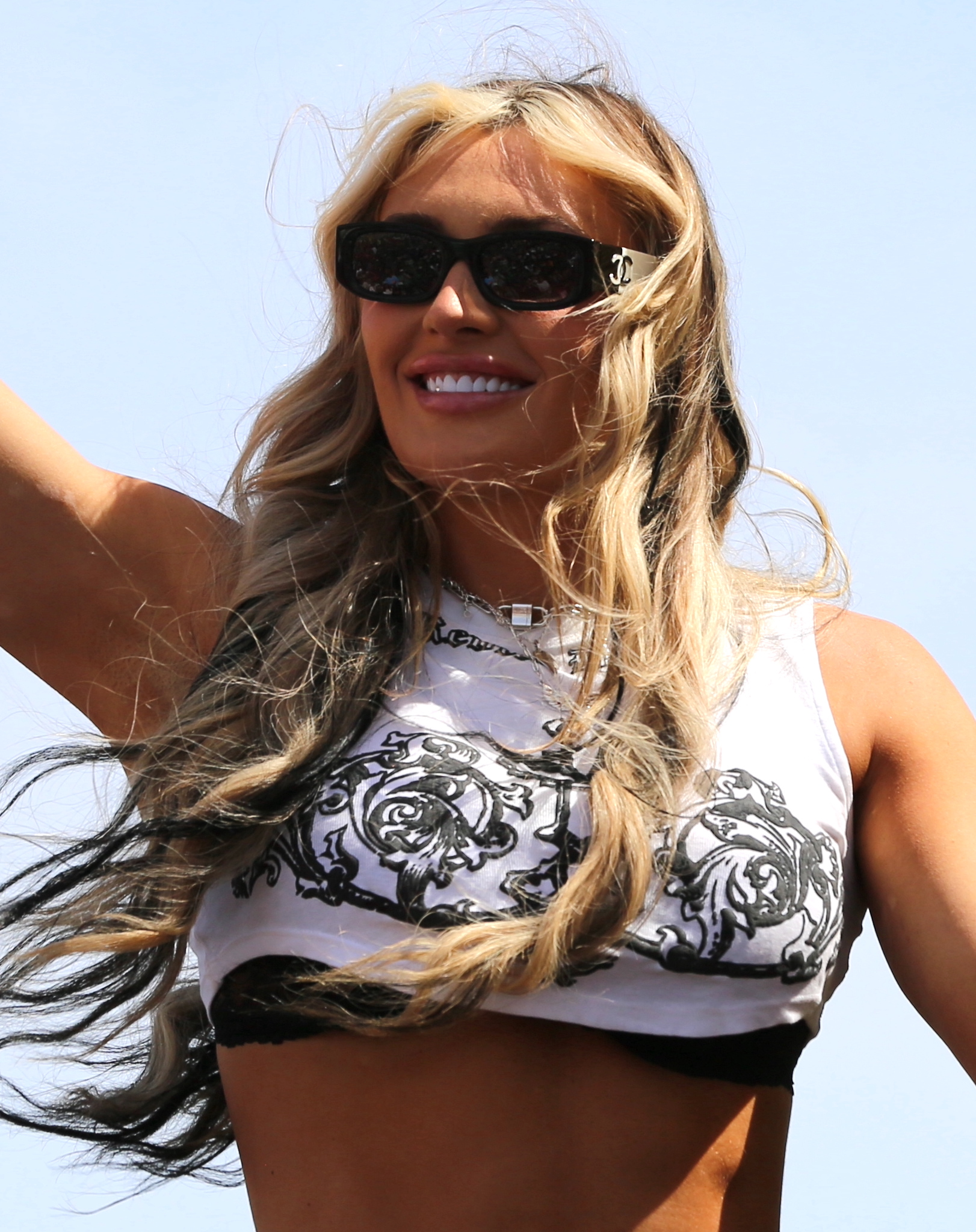
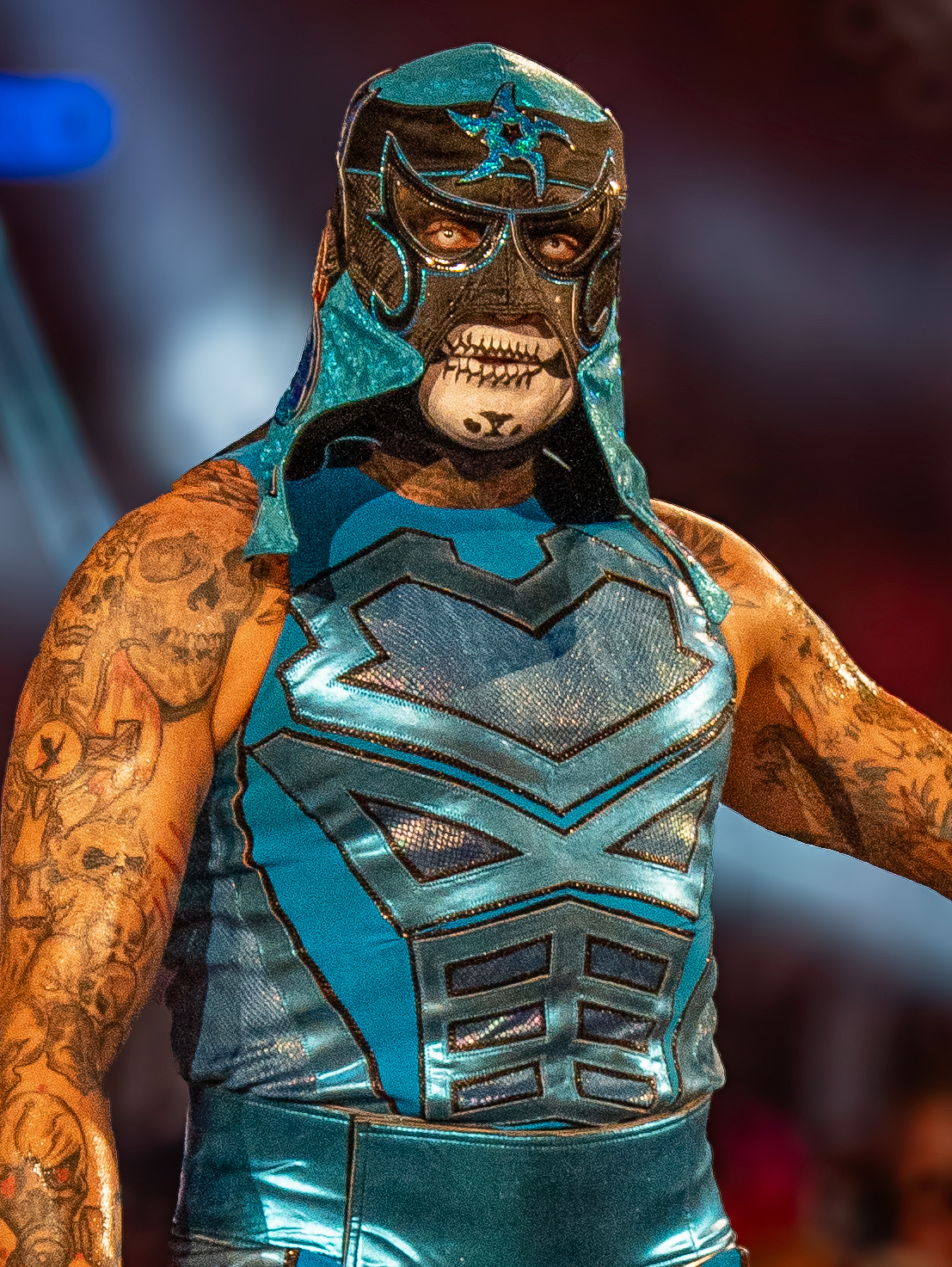
Tiffany Stratton and Penta were the respective winners of the 2026 Women's and Men's Money in the Bank ladder matches.

The main event was the men's Money in the Bank ladder match, featuring Bron Breakker, Je'Von Evans, and Penta from Raw and Trick Williams, Kevin Owens, and CM Punk from SmackDown. At the start, Penta attempted his hand gesture, only for Breakker to strike him. Punk and Owens focused on each other with the other participants cleared from the ring. Breakker and Punk focused on each other as Penta intervened. Breakker responded by suplexing Penta and Punk. Breakker and Evans's attempts at retrieving the briefcase were thwarted by Punk and Owens, respectively. Later, after Punk and Owens traded blows, Punk tossed Penta into the timekeeper's area before being sent there by Williams, followed by Evans. As Evans ran around the ring, Breakker intercepted him with a spear. Breakker prevented Punk from retrieving the briefcase, so Punk momentarily subdued him with a Russian Leg Sweep. As EMTs prepared to put Evans on a stretcher, Owens climbed the ladder when Punk, who was hanging upside down from it, fought back. Owens then sent Punk onto the ladder that was leaning against the bottom rope. Williams subdued Owens but his attempt to grab the briefcase was thwarted by Penta, who later performed a Penta Driver on Punk. As Breakker gained the upper hand on Penta, Lil Yachty distracted Breakker, allowing Williams to climb the ladder. This continued until Owens took out Williams, and then performed a Stunner on Yachty. Punk and Owens traded blows on top of the ladder until Penta pulled Punk down. Punk performed a GTS on Penta and resumed trading blows with Owens until both got speared by Breakker. Afterwards, Breakker performed a Spear on Penta followed by the same move on Punk and Owens through the barricade. As the ambulance returned, Evans struck Breakker with one of its doors and then gained the upper hand on Penta and Williams. As Evans scaled the ladder, Breakker prevented him from retrieving the briefcase. Although Evans was able to momentarily subdue Breakker, as he scaled the ladder again, Breakker tipped it over, causing Evans to fall onto the roof of the ambulance. In the climax, Breakker scaled the ladder but was thwarted by Penta, who then performed a Mexican Destroyer on Breakker through the ladder bridged between the middle rope and the other's rungs. Penta then climbed the ladder and retrieved the briefcase to win the match.

== Reception ==
Jason Powell of Pro Wrestling Dot Net called the World Heavyweight Championship match "very good", stating that Roman Reigns and LA Knight "did a great job of creating suspense with some excellent nearfalls", with the key being that "Knight looked so competitive with Reigns that he will gain something in defeat if they frame it properly on television". For the women's Money in the Bank ladder match, Powell noted Stratton "wasn't the most popular choice to win in the building", and called the men's Money in the Bank ladder match a "mixed bag", as it "felt overbooked with the ambulance, including the big stunt of Evans taking a bump through a clearly gimmicked top", along with Penta's entertainment "erased by him winning the match". Powell concluded that the event was entertaining.

Brent Brookhouse of CBS Sports graded the World Heavyweight Championship match B, stating that it "felt like it tried to do a little bit more than was needed". The women's Money in the Bank ladder match was graded C-, with Brookhouse calling it "a Money in the Bank match to forget". The Oba Femi vs. Bronson Reed match was graded B, with Brookhouse calling it a "solid enough big man match and the right man won". He also graded the Women's World Championship match B, stating that it was "another match where things got a bit clunky at times, but it was otherwise perfectly fine". The men's Money in the Bank ladder match was graded B-, as Brookhouse called it "good overall and had the right winner, but the ambulance bit was completely unnecessary and comes off as corny, given that it makes no sense for an ambulance's roof to shatter like thin plywood", but "WWE seems determined to lean on weird stunt stuff right now".

== Aftermath ==
=== Raw ===
Penta began the following episode of Raw to talk about his Money in the Bank win while promising that he will cash in the contract and become a world champion. Je'Von Evans appeared to show respect to Penta before Bron Breakker attacked Evans with a Spear. A match between Breakker and Penta took place the following week where Evans came to Penta's aid to fend off an ambush by Austin Theory, allowing Penta to win. On the October 26 episode, Penta and Evans were ambushed by The Vision following Evans's failed Undisputed WWE Championship match. This eventually led to a World Tag Team Championship match pitting Breakker and Theory against Penta and Evans for Crown Jewel.

Also on Raw, Oba Femi gave a promo about his win over Bronson Reed when Paul Heyman interrupted. Femi told Heyman that he was an "Oba Femi guy".

In the main event, the six-man tag team match between The 946 (Royce Keys, Bronco Nima, and Lucien Price) and The Bloodline (Jey Uso, Jimmy Uso, and Solo Sikoa) ended in a no-contest when Jaida Parker attacked the referee, leading to the teams brawling around the arena. Afterwards, Carmelo Hayes appeared and struck Sikoa with a crowbar, joining The 946 in the process. Roman Reigns would join The Bloodline on the October 19 episode of Raw, followed by Cruz Montana two weeks later. This led to a WarGames match between The 946 and The Bloodline for Survivor Series: WarGames.

On the October 26 episode of Raw, Raw General Manager Adam Pearce announced that Stephanie Vaquer was not medically cleared to compete and Becky Lynch would challenge Liv Morgan for the Women's World Championship in the main event. Lynch won via disqualification after interference from The Judgment Day (Raquel Rodriguez and Roxanne Perez). Afterwards, Iyo Sky and WWE Women's Champion Chelsea Green appeared, taking down The Judgment Day, as well as Morgan. Tiffany Stratton then performed the Prettiest Moonsault Ever on Morgan and attempted to cash in her Money in the Bank briefcase, but Dominik Mysterio pulled Morgan to safety. On the November 9 episode, it was announced that Lynch would face Morgan for the title again at Survivor Series: WarGames.

=== SmackDown ===
On the following episode of SmackDown, Kevin Owens and CM Punk demanded a match against each other, and SmackDown General Manager Nick Aldis stated that it would happen when they were medically cleared. The match was eventually scheduled for the November 6 episode, where Owens defeated Punk in a No Holds Barred match.

Also on SmackDown, Undisputed WWE Champion Sami Zayn congratulated Penta on his Money in the Bank win and persuaded him to focus on Roman Reigns so Zayn could remain champion.

At Crown Jewel, after WWE Women's Champion Chelsea Green defeated Liv Morgan to win the WWE Women's Crown Jewel Championship, Morgan ambushed Green. Afterwards, Tiffany Stratton appeared to attack Morgan. The Judgment Day (Raquel Rodriguez and Roxanne Perez) appeared to stop Stratton, who fended them off. After Green staved off The Judgment Day, Stratton took out Green and cashed in her Money in the Bank contract before defeating Green to win the WWE Women's Championship.

== Results ==
No.	Results	Stipulations	Times
1	Roman Reigns (c) defeated LA Knight by pinfall	Singles match for the World Heavyweight Championship	26:50
2	Tiffany Stratton defeated Jacy Jayne, Lash Legend, Lola Vice, Roxanne Perez, and Sol Ruca by retrieving the briefcase	Money in the Bank ladder match for a women's championship match contract	15:20
3	Oba Femi defeated Bronson Reed by pinfall	Singles match	11:40
4	Liv Morgan defeated Stephanie Vaquer (c) and Becky Lynch by pinfall	Triple threat match for the Women's World Championship	16:55
5	Penta defeated Bron Breakker, CM Punk, Je'Von Evans, Kevin Owens, and Trick Williams (with Lil Yachty) by retrieving the briefcase	Money in the Bank ladder match for a men's championship match contract	32:05
(c) / – the champion(s) heading into the match
