= NXT Vengeance Day (2024) =

WWE premium live event

- Promotional poster featuring Lyra Valkyria, Carmelo Hayes, Ilja Dragunov, Trick Williams, and Roxanne Perez
- Promotion: WWE
- Brand: NXT
- Date: February 4, 2024
- City: Clarksville, Tennessee
- Venue: F&M Bank Arena
- Attendance: 3,970

WWE event chronology
← Previous; Royal Rumble	Next → Elimination Chamber

Vengeance Day chronology
← Previous; 2023	Next → 2025

NXT major events chronology
← Previous; Deadline	Next → Stand & Deliver

The 2024 NXT Vengeance Day was a professional wrestling premium live event (PLE) produced by WWE, held for wrestlers from the promotion's developmental brand, NXT. It was NXT's fourth annual Vengeance Day and WWE's 12th Vengeance overall. The event took place on Sunday, February 4, 2024, at the F&M Bank Arena in Clarksville, Tennessee, marking NXT's first PLE to be held in the U.S. state of Tennessee.

Six matches were contested at the event. While the event was primarily held for NXT, one wrestler from WWE's main roster brand, SmackDown, also performed. In the main event, Ilja Dragunov defeated Trick Williams to retain the NXT Championship. In other prominent matches, Baron Corbin and Bron Breakker defeated Carmelo Hayes and Trick Williams to win the Men's Dusty Rhodes Tag Team Classic, which was the opening bout, and Lyra Valkyria defeated Roxanne Perez and Lola Vice to retain the NXT Women's Championship; this started as a singles match between Valkyria and Perez, however, midway through the match, Vice cashed in her Breakout Tournament contract, converting it into a triple threat match.

This was the first Vengeance Day to livestream on Abema in Japan. It was also the final Vengeance Day to air on Disney+ Hotstar in Indonesia, Binge in Australia, and the standalone WWE Network in most other international markets, as WWE's content in those areas moved to Netflix in January 2025.

== Production ==
=== Background ===
Vengeance was originally established as a professional wrestling pay-per-view (PPV) event for WWE in 2001 and it was held annually until 2007, followed by one event in 2011. Since its revival in 2021, it has been held annually in February for WWE's developmental brand NXT under the title NXT Vengeance Day, a reference to the event taking place on or around Valentine's Day. On November 27, 2023, NXT's fourth Vengeance Day event, and WWE's 12th Vengeance overall, was announced to be held on Sunday, February 4, 2024, at the F&M Bank Arena in Clarksville, Tennessee. This was subsequently NXT's first premium live event (PLE) to be held in the U.S. state of Tennessee.

=== Broadcast outlets ===
The PLE was broadcast on WWE's livestreaming platforms. These included Peacock in the United States, SonyLIV in India, Disney+ Hotstar in Indonesia, Disney+ in the Philippines, Binge in Australia, Abema in Japan, and the WWE Network everywhere else. It was the first Vengeance Day to livestream on Abema after the Japanese version of the WWE Network merged under Abema in October 2023.

Following an announcement made on January 23, this was the final Vengeance Day to air on the standalone WWE Network in most international markets where it was still available, as well as Disney+ Hotstar and Binge, as its content moved to Netflix in January 2025; a select few territories maintained the standalone WWE Network until early 2026 due to pre-existing contracts before they also merged under Netflix when those contracts expired.

=== Storylines ===
The event included matches that resulted from scripted storylines. Results were predetermined by WWE's writers on the NXT brand, while storylines were produced on WWE's weekly television program, NXT, and the supplementary online streaming show, Level Up.

The Men's Dusty Rhodes Tag Team Classic is a tournament composed of eight male tag teams from the NXT brand, with the winner earning a future NXT Tag Team Championship match. The tournament began on the January 9 episode of NXT with the final scheduled for Vengeance Day.

On the January 9 episode of NXT, Ava announced a 20-woman battle royal where the last four remaining wrestlers would compete in a fatal four-way match to determine a number one contender for Lyra Valkyria's NXT Women's Championship at Vengeance Day, which was scheduled for the following week. Kiana James, Fallon Henley, Kelani Jordan, and Roxanne Perez co-won the battle royal with Perez subsequently winning the fatal four-way match to face Valkyria for the title at Vengeance Day.

On the January 9 episode of NXT, SmackDown's Dragon Lee defeated Lexis King to retain the NXT North American Championship. After the match, Oba Femi cashed in his NXT Breakout Tournament contract and defeated Lee to win the title. The following week, Lee interrupted Femi and challenged him to a rematch for the title that same night, but Femi declined, revealing he was discontinuing Lee's tradition of open challenges and establishing himself as a heel in the process. Lee instead said that he would face Femi at Vengeance Day. Femi said he would take the challenge into consideration and accepted Lee's challenge the following week.

Trick Williams, the winner of the men's Iron Survivor Challenge at Deadline, was due to face Ilja Dragunov for the NXT Championship at NXT: New Year's Evil. However, Dragunov suffered an injury (kayfabe) two weeks prior to the event and was not medically cleared to wrestle. The title match was then rescheduled for Vengeance Day.

== Event ==
Other on-screen personnel
Role:	Name:
Commentators	Vic Joseph
Commentators	Wade Barrett
Spanish commentators	Marcelo Rodríguez
Spanish commentators	Jerry Soto
Ring announcer	Alicia Taylor
Referees	Adrian Butler
Referees	Chip Danning
Referees	Dallas Irvin
Referees	Derek Sanders
Referees	Felix Fernandez
Referees	Jeremy Marcus
Interviewer	Kelly Kincaid
Pre-show panel	Megan Morant
Pre-show panel	Matt Camp
Pre-show panel	Sam Roberts

=== Preliminary matches ===
The opening match was the finals of the Dusty Rhodes Tag Team Classic contested between Baron Corbin and Bron Breakker and Carmelo Hayes and Trick Williams. In the opening stages, Williams delivered an uppercut and a swinging neckbreaker to Corbin for a one-count. Williams delivered a pop-up haymaker to Corbin, while Hayes landed a superkick and the Fade Away on Breakker. Hayes then attempted to suplex to Breakker, but Breakker countered it into a cutter. Breakker delivered a suplex to Hayes for a one-count. Breakker then attempted a belly-to-back suplex to Hayes, but Hayes landed on his feet and tagged him Williams. Williams delivered two leg lariats and clotheslines to Corbin. Williams then performed the Book End on Corbin for a two-count. Hayes then delivered a slingshot senton and a springboard moonsault to Corbin for a two-count. Hayes then delivered the First 48 Codebreaker to Breakker for a two-count. Corbin then performed a somersault plancha on Williams and a Deep Six to Hayes for a two-count. Hayes then performed a gourdbuster and attempted the Nothing But Net, but Corbin caught him and attempted the End of Days, but Hayes escaped. Williams then delivered a leaping neckbreaker to Corbin. Breakker then delivered a spear to Hayes and pinned him to win the match.

The next match was a No Disqualification match between Dijak and Joe Gacy. In the opening stages, Dijak delivered a lariat and a release bodyslam to Gacy for a one-count. Gacy then delivered a running cannonball to Dijak into the steps and hit Dijak's head on the steel steps multiple times. Dijak then delivered a Cyclone Boot to Gacy for a one-count. Dijak then proceeded to perform a Death Valley Driver to Gacy for another one-count. Dijak the out Gacy's head into a trash can and delivered an elbow drop. Gacy then delivered a Saito suplex and a Uranage for a two-count. Dijak then delivered a sit-out chokeslam to Gacy onto a chair for a two-count. Gacy then performed an avalanche German suplex to Dijak for a two-count. Gacy proceeded to wrap duck tape around Dijak's eyes. Gacy then attempted to hit the Upside Down, but Dijak caught him and delivered Feast Your Eyes, but with his eyes still shut, he wasn't able to make the pin. Gacy then delivered a DDT and a diving splash to Dijak onto a chair for a two-count. Dijak removed the duck tape from his eyes and hit Gacy with a nightstick. Dijak then delivered Feast Your Eyes and pinned Gacy to win.

The next match was a six-person mixed tag team match contested between The Family (Tony D'Angelo, Channing "Stacks" Lorenzo and Adrianna Rizzo) and OTM (Lucien Price, Bronco Nima and Jaida Parker) (accompanied by Scrypts). In the closing stages, Price and Nima performed a double Samoan Drop to D'Angelo and Stacks for a two-count. Price and Nima then performed an assisted powerslam to Stacks for a two-count. D'Angelo then performed two overhead belly-to-belly suplexes to Nima. D'Angelo then delivered a butterfly suplex and spinebuster to Price. D'Angelo and Stacks then delivered an assisted somersault plancha to Price and Nima, while Rizzo delivered a diving crossbody to Parker, Price and Nima. D'Angelo then delivered a pop-up spinebuster to Price and then delivered the Forget About It fisherman neckbreaker and pinned Price to win the match.

The next match was for the NXT Women's Championship contested between defending champion Lyra Valkyria and Roxanne Perez. In the opening stages, Perez attempted a suicide dive, but Valkyria impeded it with a forearm smash. Perez then delivered a side Russian legsweep and a springboard moonsault to Valkyria for a two-count. Valkyria then delivered a running fisherman suplex and a release German suplex to Perez for a two-count. Perez then hit Pop Rocks, but before Perez made the cover, Lola Vice came down to the ring and cashed in her Breakout Tournament contract, turning the match into a triple threat match. Vice delivered a Windmill kick to Perez for a two-count. Vice them locked in a triangle choke on Perez, but Valkyria used a diving splash to break up the submission. Perez attempted a diving crossbody to Valkyria, but Valkyria caught her and delivered the Night Witch. Valkyria then delivered a uraken to Vice for a two-count. Perez then delivered another Pop Rocks to Valkyria for a nearfall. Tatum Paxley then came down and attacked Perez. Vice attempted Buenas Noches, but Valkyria ducked and delivered Night Wish to retain her title.

In the penultimate match, Oba Femi defended the NXT North American Championship against Dragon Lee. In the opening stages, Lee delivered a corner dropkick and a diving double foot stomp to Femi for a two-count. Femi then delivered a one-arm spinebuster and a suplex for a two-count. Femi then delivered an elbow drop and three backbreakers to Lee for a two-count. Lee then delivered a superkick to Femi then proceeded to deliver a tornado DDT and a running bicycle knee strike for a two-count. Lee then performed an enzeguiri on the apron and then a sit-out powerbomb on Femi for a nearfall. Femi attempted a chokeslam to Lee on the floor, but Lee countered it into a DDT. Femi attempted a powerbomb, but Lee countered it into a hurricarana for a two-count. Femi then delivered a lariat, a hip toss and a pop-up powerbomb to Lee and pinned him to retain his title.

=== Main event ===
In the main event, Ilja Dragunov defended the NXT Championship against Trick Williams (accompanied by Carmelo Hayes). In the opening stages, Williams attempted a pop-up haymaker, but Dragunov countered it with an enzeguiri and then performed the Constantine Special. Dragunov then delivered two German suplexes and a big boot. Dragunov then delivered a snap German suplex on the floor and a Death Valley between on the apron. Dragunov rolled Williams back into the ring and delivered a Coast-to-Coast for a two-count. Williams attempted a Cyclone Kick, but Dragunov ducked and delivered a powerbomb and proceeded to perform an H-Bomb, but Williams moved out of the way and delivered an enzeguiri. Williams then delivered a Codebreaker and two leg lariats. Williams then delivered a leaping clothesline and uranage off the apron to Dragunov. Hayes started trash talking Dragunov, which caused Dragunov to push Hayes into Williams's knee. Williams delivered a leaping neckbreaker, but Dragunov followed it up with an H-Bomb for a nearfall. Dragunov then delivered a powerbomb and two H-Bombs to Williams for a nearfall. Dragunov attempted the Torpedo Moscow, but Williams escaped and delivered a Cyclone Kick for a nearfall. As Hayes was distracting the referee, Williams attempted to push Dragunov out of the way, but ended up knocking out the referee. Williams then delivered the Trick Knee, after which a different referee appeared to count a nearfall. Dragunov then delivered a bicycle knee strike and another H-Bomb. Dragunov then attempted to perform another H-Bomb, but Williams got his knees up. Dragunov attempted to deliver the Torpedo Moscow, while Williams wanted to impede it with the Trick Knee. However, Dragunov hit the Torpedo Moscow first and pinned Williams to retain the title. After the match, Hayes feigned consoling Williams and then delivered a chop block to Williams's leg. Hayes then brought out a steel chair and repeatedly hit it on Williams' already injured knee. Hayes then covered Williams with a TMG (Trick-Melo Gang) shirt and started taunting him as the event went off the air.

== Reception ==
Dave Meltzer of the Wrestling Observer Newsletter rated the Dusty Rhodes Tag Team Classic finals 3.5 stars, the No Disqualification match 3.25 stars, the six-person mixed tag match 2.25 stars (the lowest rated match on the card), the NXT Women's title match 2.75 stars, the North American Championship match 2.5 stars and the NXT Championship match 4 stars (the highest rated match on the card)

Kevin Berge of Bleacher Report graded the show a B+, saying "NXT delivered a night to remember at Vengeance Day, but it's one that comes off as a preamble to the top program NXT is ready to produce. The opener set up vulnerabilities for Trick Williams that cost him his shot at Ilja Dragunov in the main event. However, both matches suffered a bit from the need to set up something bigger down the line. Dragon Lee and Oba Femi stole the show in what could be the night that made a future megastar. Dijak and Joe Gacy overdelivered in a filler position, but The Family vs. OTM could have been left off the card. As a whole, NXT ensured fans remembered this night. However, it is Stand & Deliver that will be the gold brand's greatest night of 2024 considering the build to come".

== Results ==
No.	Results	Stipulations	Times
1	Baron Corbin and Bron Breakker defeated Trick Melo Gang (Carmelo Hayes and Trick Williams) by pinfall	Men's Dusty Rhodes Tag Team Classic Final; The winners received a future NXT Tag Team Championship match.	14:27
2	Dijak defeated Joe Gacy by pinfall	No Disqualification match	11:56
3	The Family (Tony D'Angelo, Channing "Stacks" Lorenzo, and Adriana Rizzo) defeated OTM (Lucien Price, Bronco Nima, and Jaida Parker) (with Scrypts) by pinfall	Six-person mixed tag team match	10:11
4	Lyra Valkyria (c) defeated Roxanne Perez and Lola Vice by pinfall (Note: The match was originally a singles match between Valkyria and Perez, however, Vice cashed in her Breakout Tournament contract while the match was in progress, converting it into a triple threat match.)	Triple threat match for the NXT Women's Championship; This was Vice's Breakout Tournament championship cash-in match.	13:30
5	Oba Femi (c) defeated Dragon Lee by pinfall	Singles match for the NXT North American Championship	10:56
6	Ilja Dragunov (c) defeated Trick Williams (with Carmelo Hayes) by pinfall	Singles match for the NXT Championship	17:58
(c) / – the champion(s) heading into the match

=== Dusty Rhodes Tag Team Classic ===
First round NXT; January 9–16, 2024
Baron Corbin and Bron Breakker	Pinfall
Gallus (Mark Coffey and Wolfgang)	10:54
Axiom and Nathan Frazer	Pinfall
Hank Walker and Tank Ledger	4:45
Chase University (Duke Hudson and Riley Osborne)	9:43
Latino World Order (Cruz Del Toro and Joaquin Wilde)	Pinfall
Carmelo Hayes and Trick Williams	Pinfall
Edris Enofé and Malik Blade	12:08

Semifinals; NXT; January 23–30, 2024
Baron Corbin and Bron Breakker	Pinfall
Axiom and Nathan Frazer	12:04
Latino World Order (Cruz Del Toro and Joaquin Wilde)	12:33
Carmelo Hayes and Trick Williams	Pinfall

Final; Vengeance Day; February 4, 2024
Baron Corbin and Bron Breakker	Pinfall
Carmelo Hayes and Trick Williams	14:27
