= 946 (professional wrestling) =

Professional wrestling stable

The 946
- The stable's logo

Stable
- Name: The 946
- Leader: Royce Keys
- Members: Lucien Price; Bronco Nima; Jaida Parker; Carmelo Hayes; Cruz Montana
- Debut: August 24, 2026
- Years active: 2026–present

The 946 is a villainous professional wrestling stable that performs in WWE on the Raw brand. The stable consists of leader Royce Keys, Lucien Price, Bronco Nima, Jaida Parker, Carmelo Hayes, and Cruz Montana.

The stable's gimmick is that of a street gang, and the name is in reference to the three-digit sectional center facility ZIP Code of Oakland, California, which is Nima's hometown.

== History ==
On the August 3, 2026 episode of Raw, Royce Keys, who was feuding with The Bloodline for the last month alongside LA Knight and Solo Sikoa, was defeated by Jacob Fatu in a street fight. Fatu continued attacking him after the match, resulting in a storyline injury. Keys returned on the August 24 episode of Raw and was accompanied by OTM (Bronco Nima and Lucien Price) to attack Fatu and The Usos (Jey Uso and Jimmy Uso), as well his former allies, Knight and Sikoa, turning heel and forming a new group. On September 4, Keys announced the stable's name to be "946" (referring to the three-digit sectional center facility ZIP Code of Oakland, California, Nima's hometown). In the following two months, Jaida Parker, Carmelo Hayes, and Cruz Montana also joined the group.

== Members ==
The 946
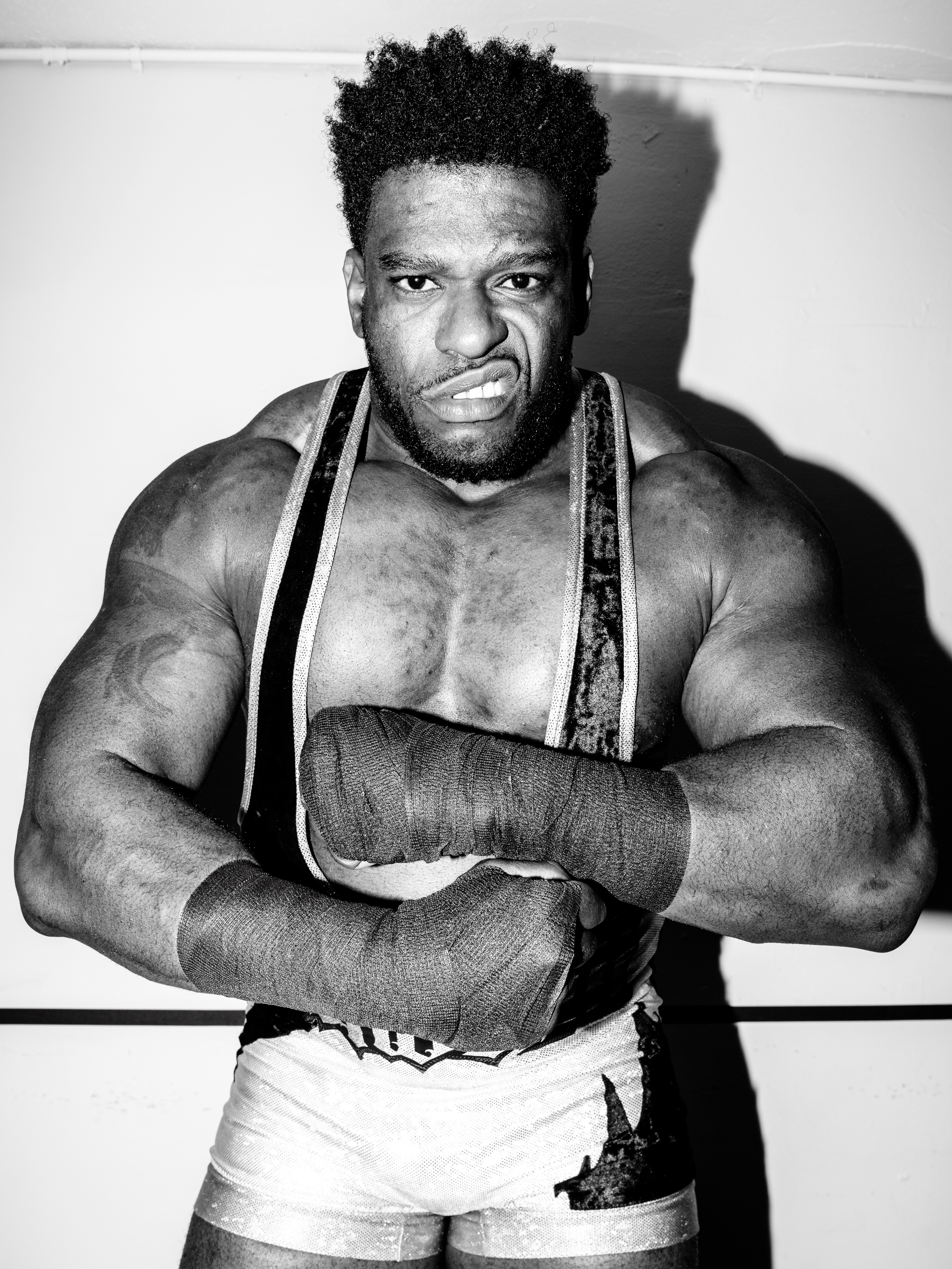
Royce Keys

Lucien Price

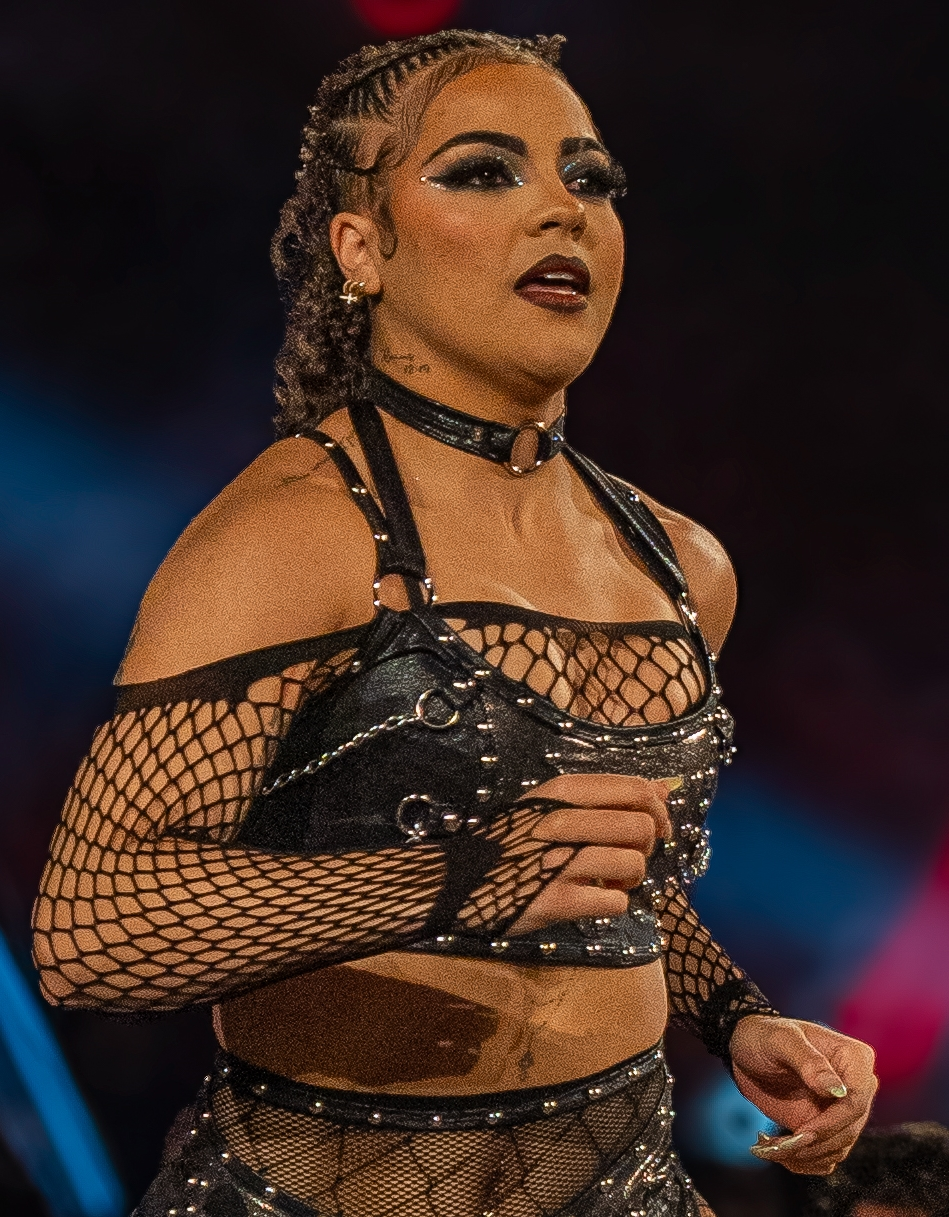
Jaida Parker

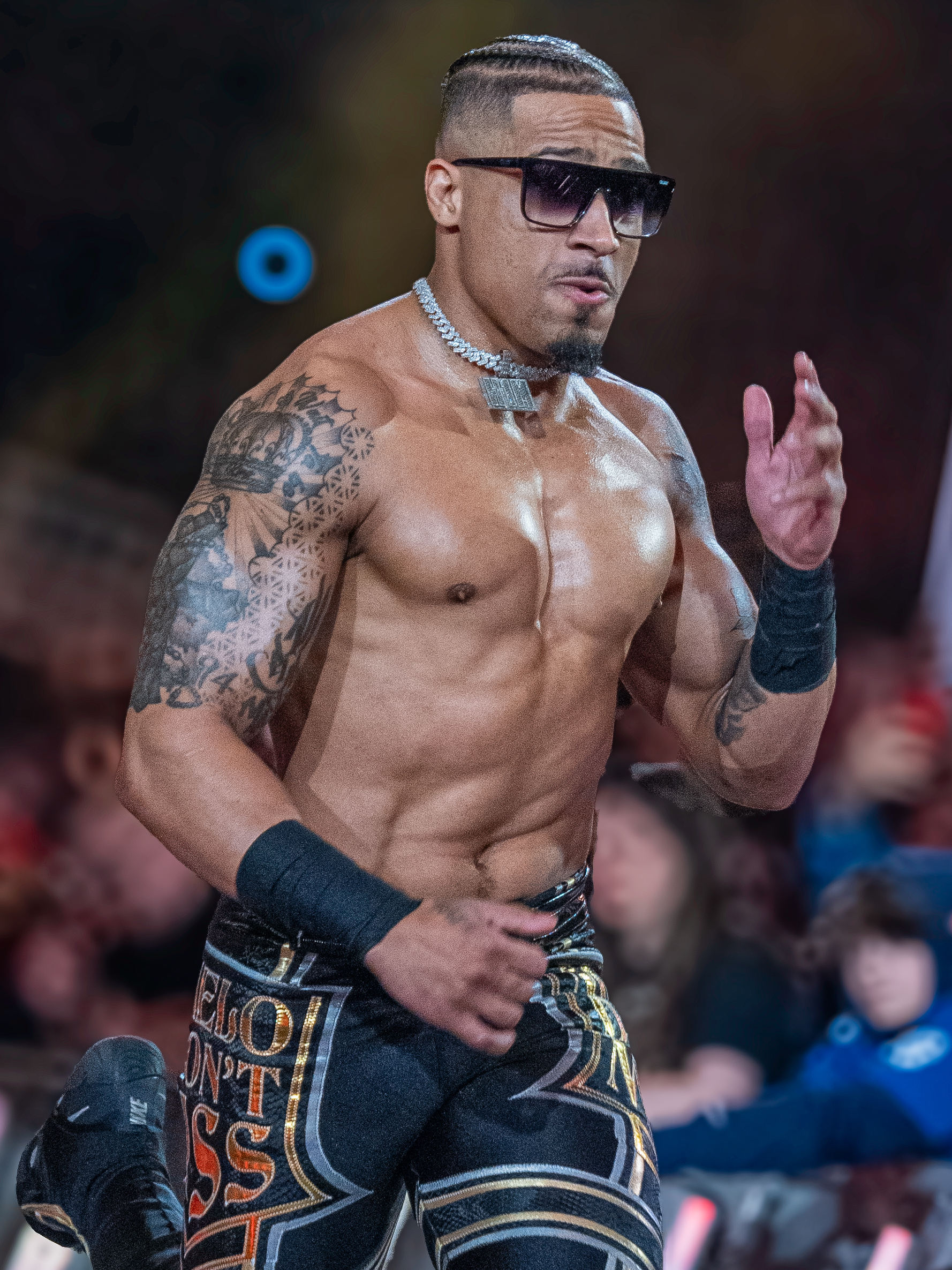
Carmelo Hayes

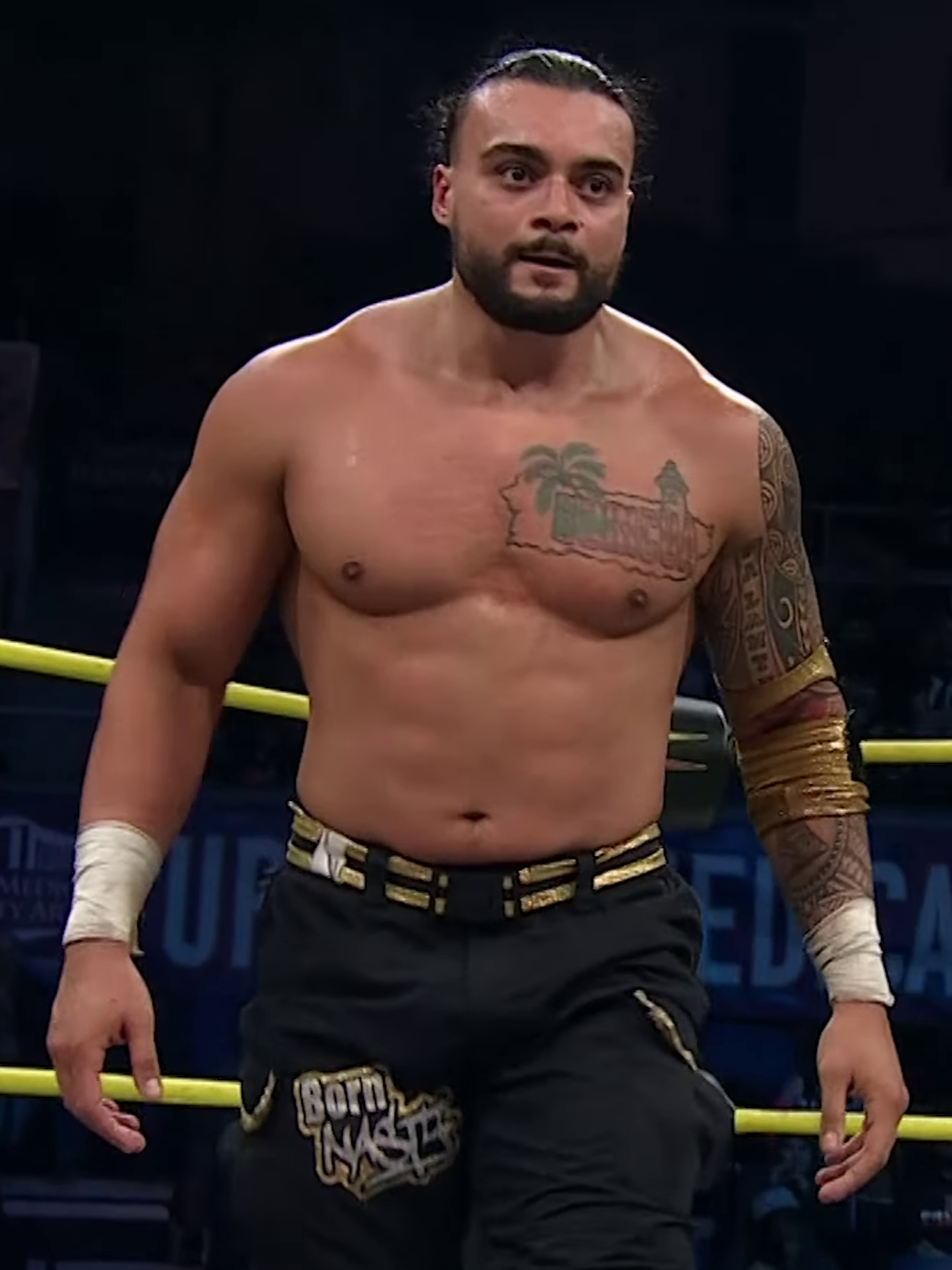
Cruz Montana

*	Founding member(s)
L	Leader

Member		Joined
Royce Keys (L)	*	August 24, 2026
Lucien Price	*	August 24, 2026
Bronco Nima	*	August 24, 2026
Jaida Parker		September 28, 2026
Carmelo Hayes		October 12, 2026
Cruz Montana		November 2, 2026

== Sub-groups ==
Affiliate	Members	Tenure	Type
Out the Mud (OTM)	Lucien Price; Bronco Nima	2026–present	Tag team
