= Axiom (wrestler) =

Spanish professional wrestler (born 1997)

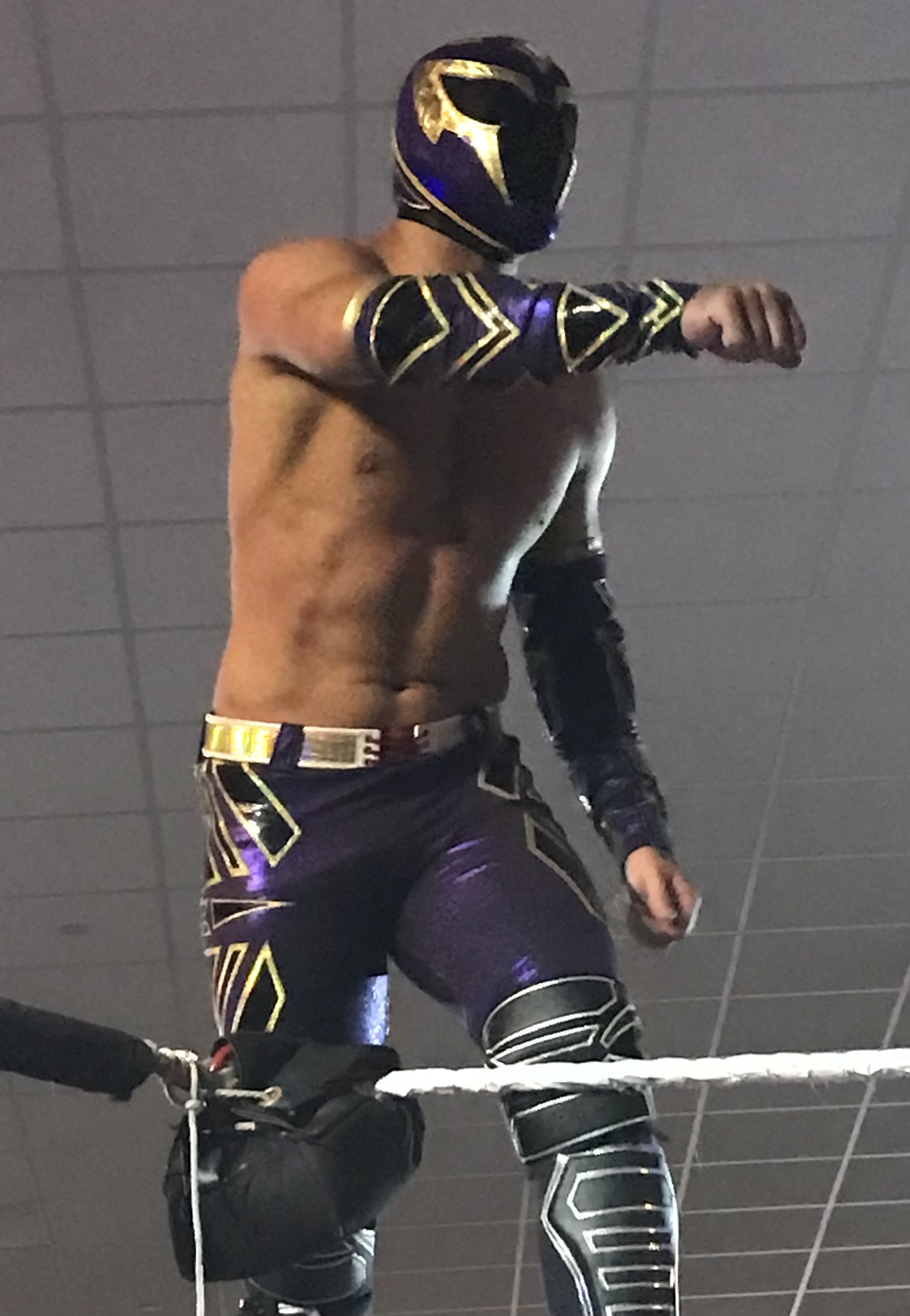
- Axiom in 2024

Personal information
- Born: Carlos Ruíz; May 9, 1997 (age 29) Madrid, Spain

Professional wrestling career
- Ring name(s): A-Kid; Axiom; El Niño Anónimo; The Kung-Fu Kid
- Billed height: 5 ft 8 in (173 cm)
- Billed weight: 154 lb (70 kg)
- Billed from: Madrid, Spain
- Debut: July 14, 2012

Carlos Ruíz
Personal information
- Date of birth: May 9th 1997
- Place of birth: Madrid, Spain

Youth career
- Years: Team
- late 2000s - early 2010s: Real Madrid

Carlos Ruíz (born May 9, 1997) is a Spanish professional wrestler and former footballer. He is signed to WWE, where he performs on the SmackDown brand under the ring name Axiom and is one-half of Fraxiom along with Nathan Frazer. He is a former one-time and the inaugural NXT UK Heritage Cup Champion as A-Kid and a two-time NXT Tag Team Champion with Nathan Frazer. He is the first ever Spaniard to compete for and win championships in WWE.

Prior to joining WWE, Ruíz as A-Kid competed in various American and European independent circuits, notably for Pro Wrestling Guerrilla (PWG), Progress Wrestling, and Chikara.

== Early and personal life ==
Carlos Ruíz was born and raised in Madrid, Spain. Prior to becoming a professional wrestler, he played football and is a former Real Madrid youth player, having trained under Zinedine Zidane.

== Professional wrestling career ==
=== Early career (2012–2019) ===
In June 2016, it was announced that Ruíz, performing under the name A-Kid would participate with Rod Zayas and Adam Chase in Chikara's King of Trios, as House White Wolf. However, they would be defeated by House Strong Style (Pete Dunne, Trent Seven, and Tyler Bate) in the first round. Next year, he participated in Chikara's Rey de Voladores tournament, but was defeated in the finals by Air Wolf. The following years, A-Kid and Adam Chase (later, Carlos Romo) wrestled in the British circuit as Team White Wolf, winning the ATTACK! Tag Team Championship. They also faced each other at the RevPro 7th Anniversary Show.

=== WWE ===
==== NXT UK and NXT (2019–2023) ====
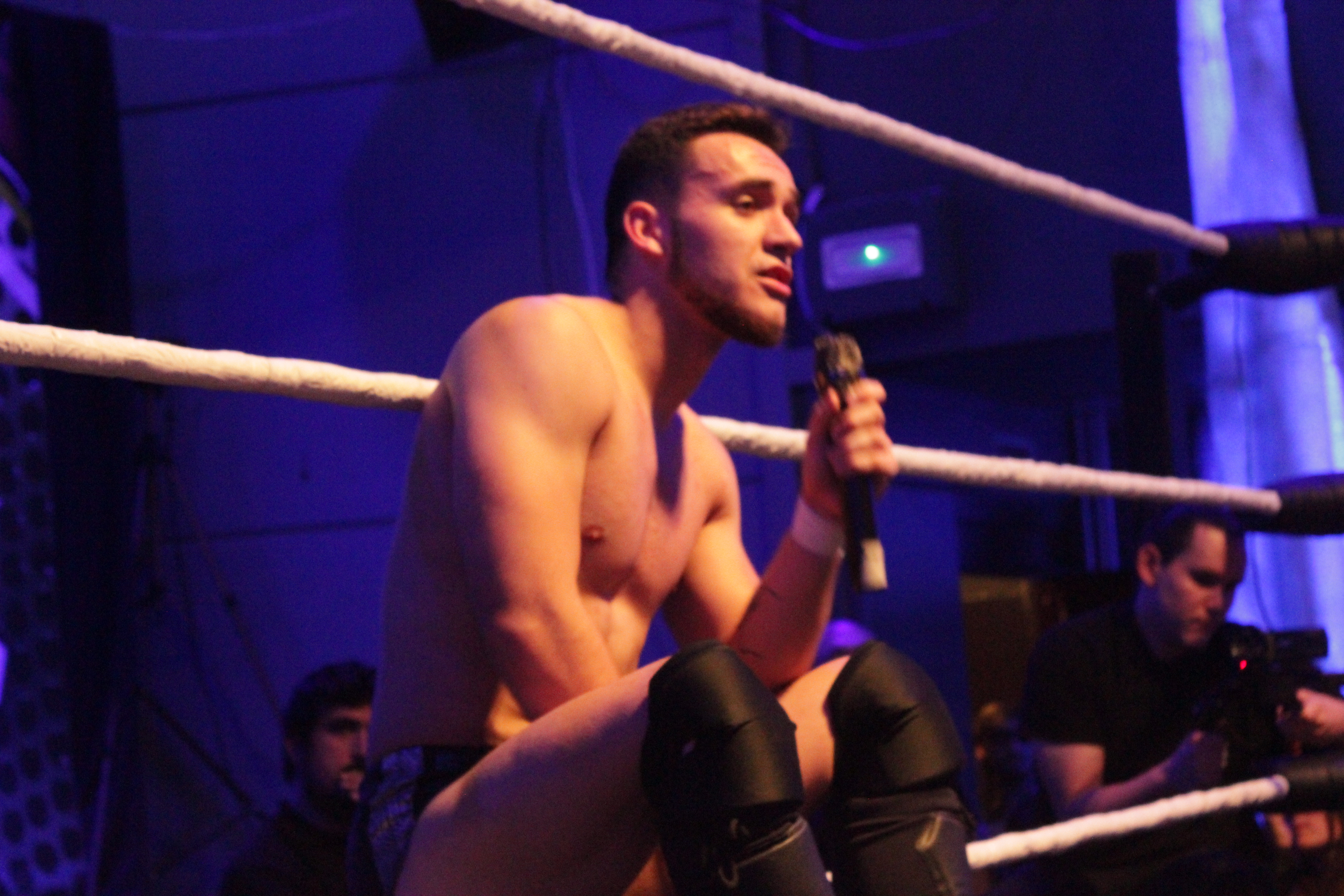
A-Kid in 2019

Ruiz (as A-Kid) made his WWE debut alongside fellow wrestler Carlos Romo on April 20, 2019, where they were defeated by Gallus (Mark Coffey and Wolfgang) during a set of NXT UK tapings. On October 17, 2019, A-Kid was announced as having signed for the NXT UK brand. He made his singles debut on October 31, 2019, defeating Kassius Ohno. On November 26, 2020, A-Kid became the first-ever NXT UK Heritage Cup Champion Champion by defeating Trent Seven in the finals of a tournament, becoming the first Spanish wrestler to win a championship in WWE. On the May 20, 2021, episode of NXT UK, A-Kid lost the Heritage Cup to Tyler Bate. On the October 14 episode of NXT UK, A-Kid faced Ilja Dragunov for the NXT United Kingdom Championship but was defeated.

On the March 15, 2022 episode of NXT, A-Kid made his debut on the brand coming from NXT UK in a winning effort against Kushida for a spot in a ladder match at NXT Stand & Deliver for the NXT North American Championship. The following week he competed on NXT in a losing effort against Grayson Waller. The following week on March 29, A-Kid was entered in a triple threat match against Cameron Grimes and Roderick Strong in a last chance opportunity for the NXT North American Championship match at NXT Stand & Deliver.

In July 2022, Ruiz was repackaged as a masked superhero named Axiom. He competed on the July 19 episode of NXT 2.0 defeating Dante Chen. He then entered a best of three series against Nathan Frazer where he won the first match on the September 6 episode of NXT 2.0 but lost the other two matches on September 13 and October 11 episodes of NXT. At NXT Deadline, Axiom failed to win the Iron Survivor Challenge. Axiom entered a brief rivalry with Carmelo Hayes where he lost to him on the December 13 episode of NXT but defeated Trick Williams on the January 17 episode of NXT. At NXT Stand & Deliver, Axiom failed to win the NXT North American Championship and lost again on the following episode of NXT to Wes Lee. Axiom entered a rivalry with Scrypts where he defeated him on the May 2 episode of NXT, unmasking Scrypts after the match. Shortly afterwards, the two started teaming after Scrypts turned face. On the July 18 edition of NXT, Scrypts turned on Axiom and aligned himself with their opponents, the debuting Bronco Nima & Lucien Price, during their scheduled match. Axiom wrestled his main roster debut match on the November 17, 2023 episode of SmackDown in a losing effort to Dragon Lee.

==== Fraxiom (2023–present) ====
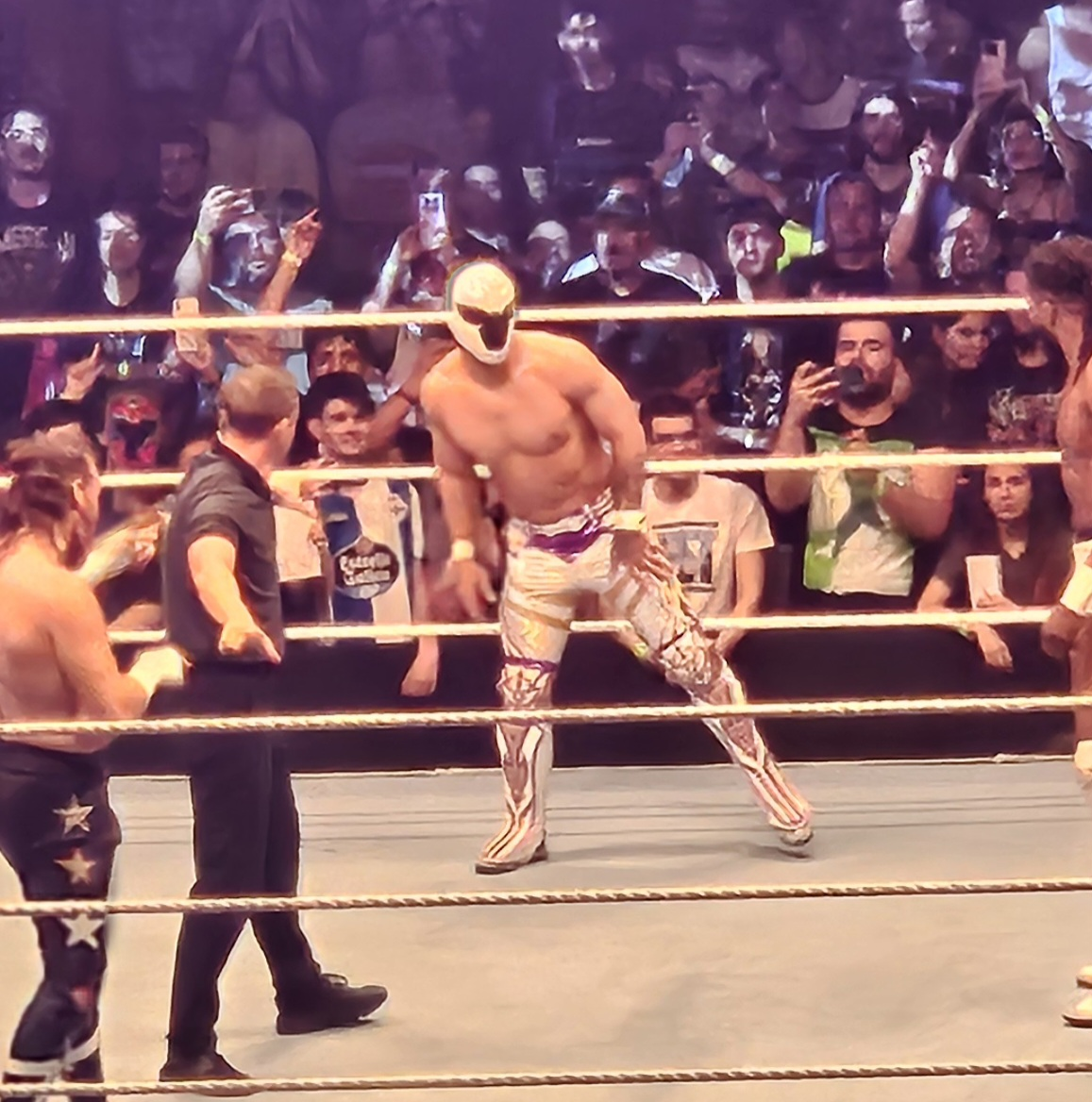
Axiom in 2026

At the NXT Deadline kickoff show, Axiom defeated Nathan Frazer. After this, he formed a tag team partnership with Frazer (with the team later colloquially called Fraxiom). In early 2024, Fraxiom participated in the NXT Tag Team Championship Eliminator Tournament, defeating No Quarter Catch Crew (Charlie Dempsey and Myles Borne) in the first round and Latino World Order (Joaquin Wilde and Cruz Del Toro) and The Good Brothers (Luke Gallows and Karl Anderson) in a triple threat tag team match in the final to face NXT Tag Team Champions The Wolf Dogs (Baron Corbin and Bron Breakker) for the titles at NXT Stand & Deliver, but failed to win the match. In a rematch on the following episode of NXT, Fraxiom defeated The Wolf Dogs to become the new NXT Tag Team Champions. Much later, Frazer started to set his sights on singles titles to Axiom's displeasure. Eventually, Axiom would do the same as he faced LWO's Joaquin Wilde on the 31 July episode of Speed in the Speed Championship #1 Contenders Tournament in a losing effort. After multiple successful title defenses, on the August 13 episode of NXT, Fraxiom lost the titles to Chase University's Andre Chase and Ridge Holland, ending their first reign at 126 days. The pair regained the titles in a rematch 19 days later at NXT No Mercy to become two-time champions. Soon after, Frazer began to set his sights on singles championships again. On the November 26 episode of NXT, Axiom lost to Ethan Page in an Iron Survivor Challenge qualifier. At NXT: Roadblock on March 11, 2025, Fraxiom failed to defeat TNA World Tag Team Champions The Hardy Boyz for the title. Three days later on SmackDown, Axiom made his second SmackDown appearance where he lost to World Heavyweight Champion Gunther. At NXT Stand & Deliver on April 19, Fraxiom lost the NXT Tag Team Championships to Hank and Tank (Hank Walker and Tank Ledger) in their final match for NXT, ending their second reign at 230 days.

On the April 25 episode of SmackDown, Fraxiom were promoted to the SmackDown brand, where they defeated Legado Del Fantasma's Los Garza (Angel and Berto) in their first match as a team in the main roster. After four successive tag team match wins, including a non-title match against WWE Tag Team Champions The Street Profits (Angelo Dawkins and Montez Ford), Fraxiom faced The Street Profits for the titles on the May 23 episode of SmackDown which ended in a no-contest after interference from #DIY (Johnny Gargano and Tommaso Ciampa) and Candice LeRae, Motor City Machine Guns (Alex Shelley and Chris Sabin), and the returning Wyatt Sicks (Uncle Howdy, Erick Rowan, Dexter Lumis, Joe Gacy and Nikki Cross).

=== Total Nonstop Action Wrestling (2025) ===
Ruiz, as Axiom, and Nathan Frazer made their Total Nonstop Action Wrestling (TNA) debut at Genesis on January 19, 2025 during the tag team title match between TNA World Tag Team Champions The Hardys (Matt Hardy and Jeff Hardy) and The Rascalz (Trey Miguel and Zachary Wentz). Later that night, it was announced that Fraxiom will defend the NXT Tag Team Championship against The Rascalz on the January 23 episode of Impact!, becoming the first WWE wrestlers to defend a WWE championship in TNA where they successfully retained the titles after interference from Wes Lee, Tyriek Igwe and Tyson Dupont.

== Other media ==
Ruiz, as A-Kid made his video game debut in WWE 2K22 as downloadable content (DLC) alongside The Hurricane, Wes Lee, and Stacy Keibler known as the "Stand Back Pack". He appeared as Axiom in the base game in WWE 2K23, WWE 2K24 and WWE 2K25 and WWE 2K26.

== Championship and accomplishments ==
- Attack! Pro Wrestling
  - Attack! Tag Team Championship (1 time) – with Adam Chase
- Pro Wrestling Illustrated
  - Ranked him No. 118 of the top 500 singles wrestlers in the PWI 500 in 2021
  - Ranked him No. 2 of the top 100 tag team wrestlers in the PWI 100 in 2024 – with Nathan Frazer
- Westside Xtreme Wrestling
  - Ambition: Wildcard Edition (2019)
- White Wolf Wrestling
  - Triple W Absolute Championship (3 times)
  - Triple W Extreme Championship (1 time)
  - Triple W Heavyweight Championship (1 time)
- WWE
  - NXT UK Heritage Cup (1 time, inaugural)
  - NXT Tag Team Championship (2 times) – with Nathan Frazer
  - NXT Tag Team Championship Eliminator Tournament (2024) – with Nathan Frazer
  - NXT UK Heritage Cup Inaugural Tournament (2020)
  - NXT Year-End Award (1 time)
    - Tag Team of the Year (2024) – with Nathan Frazer
