= Solo Sikoa =

American professional wrestler

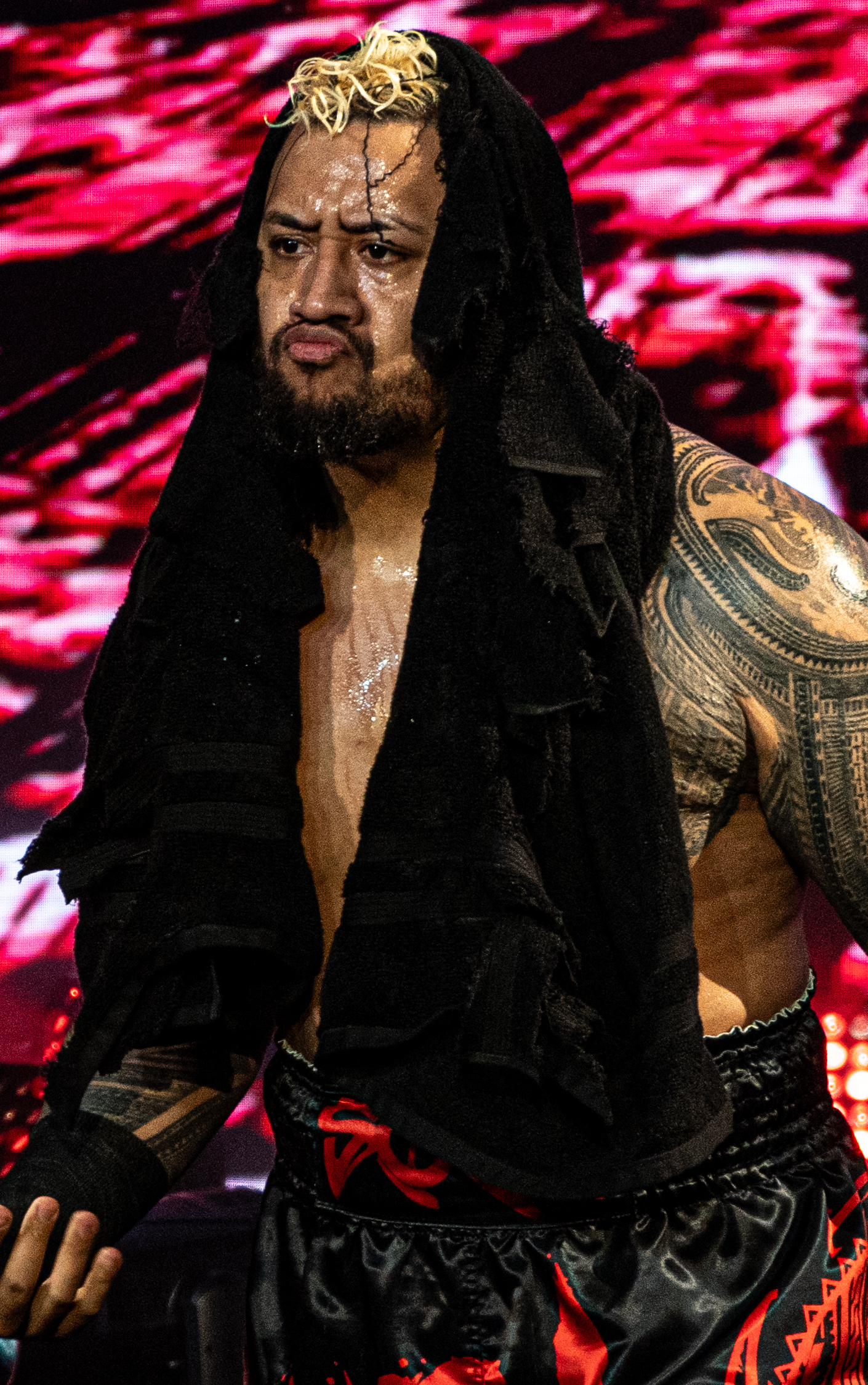
- Sikoa in 2024

Personal information
- Born: Joseph Yokozuna Fatu; March 18, 1993 (age 33) Sacramento, California, U.S.
- Education: Dickinson State University (BA)
- Spouse: Almia Williams (m. 2023)
- Children: 2
- Father: Rikishi
- Family: Anoaʻi

Professional wrestling career
- Ring name(s): Sefa Fatu; Solo Sikoa
- Billed height: 6 ft 2 in (188 cm)
- Billed weight: 250 lb (113 kg)
- Billed from: Las Vegas, Nevada
- Trained by: Rikishi; WWE Performance Center; Kenny King; Sinn Bodhi
- Debut: April 29, 2018

Joseph Yokozuna Fatu (born March 18, 1993) is an American professional wrestler. He is signed to WWE, where he performs on the SmackDown brand under the ring name Solo Sikoa and is a member of The Bloodline stable.

Fatu began his professional wrestling career in 2018 under the ring name Sefa Fatu on the independent circuit. He then signed with WWE in 2021 and was assigned to the NXT brand as Solo Sikoa before being called up to the main roster a year later, debuting at Clash at the Castle. He joined The Bloodline stable at first as a silent enforcer, then was repackaged as the self-proclaimed "Tribal Chief" until January before the stable seceded and spun out from The Bloodline as July 2025 under the name MFT. In the WWE, he has held the NXT North American Championship, the WWE United States Championship, and the WWE Tag Team Championship once each.

As the son of Rikishi and brother of Jonathan and Joshua (Jimmy and Jey Uso), Fatu is a member of the Anoaʻi family of Samoan wrestlers.

== Early life ==
Fatu was born into the Anoaʻi family of Samoan wrestlers, which includes his father Rikishi and older twin brothers Jonathan and Joshua. He is named after his first cousin once removed's in-ring name, Yokozuna. He attended Rosemont High School, where he was a standout American football player. He then continued to play at the college level; first at American River College in Sacramento and then at Dickinson State University in Dickinson, North Dakota.

== Professional wrestling career ==
=== Independent circuit (2018–2021) ===
On April 29, 2018, Fatu made his in-ring debut under the ring name Sefa Fatu and regularly teamed up with his cousins, Jacob and Journey Fatu. On January 25, 2019, Fatu would win the FSW Nevada State Championship, holding the belt for 149 days until losing to Hammerstone in June. In August 2019, Fatu defeated Watson to win the Arizona Wrestling Federation (AWF) heavyweight title, which he held for 418 days until losing it in January 2021.

=== WWE (2021–present) ===
==== NXT (2021–2022) ====
On August 30, 2021, it was announced that Fatu signed a contract with WWE. He was assigned to their development brand, NXT, and made his debut on October 26 at Halloween Havoc under the ring name Solo Sikoa, interrupting a segment between co-hosts Grayson Waller and LA Knight before attacking Waller. Sikoa made his in-ring debut on the November 2 episode of NXT, defeating Jeet Rama. In December, Sikoa began a feud with Boa after his alter-ego attacked and choked him backstage. They fought to a double countout on the January 11, 2022 episode of NXT, but Sikoa defeated Boa in a No Disqualification Falls Count Anywhere match on the January 25 episode of NXT. On the March 1 episode of NXT, Sikoa suffered his first loss in NXT against Gunther, ending his undefeated streak.

Sikoa competed in a five-way ladder match for the NXT North American Championship at the Stand & Deliver pay-per-view on April 2, which was won by Cameron Grimes. He failed to win the title from Grimes on the April 12 episode of NXT and in a triple threat match involving Carmelo Hayes at Spring Breakin' on May 3. After weeks of brawling between Sikoa and Von Wagner, Sikoa defeated Wagner in a Falls Count Anywhere match on the August 2 episode of NXT in his final match for the brand, suffering a knee injury in the process.

==== The Enforcer of the Bloodline (2022–2024) ====
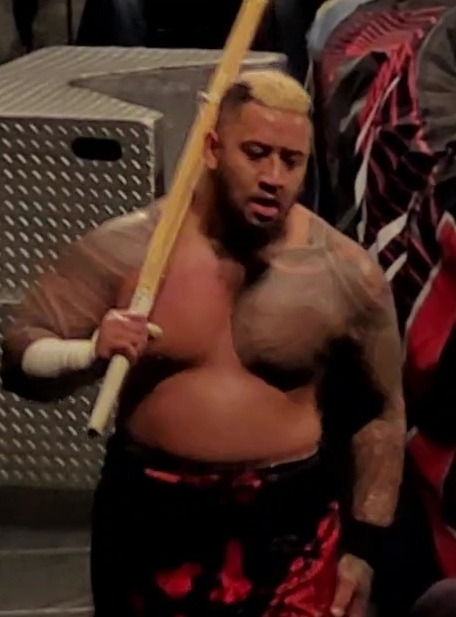
Sikoa in October 2023

At Clash at the Castle on September 3, 2022, Sikoa returned from injury and interfered in the main event match between his cousin Roman Reigns and Drew McIntyre, helping Reigns retain the Undisputed WWE Universal Championship and aligning himself with The Bloodline, turning heel in the process. He made his main roster in-ring debut against McIntyre on the September 9 episode of SmackDown, losing by disqualification after Karrion Kross attacked McIntyre. On the September 13 episode of NXT 2.0, Sikoa made a surprise appearance, defeating Hayes to win the NXT North American Championship. He retained the title three nights later on SmackDown against Madcap Moss, but was forced to vacate it on the September 20 episode of NXT. At Survivor Series: WarGames on November 26, Sikoa and The Bloodline defeated The Brawling Brutes (Sheamus, Ridge Holland and Butch), McIntyre and Kevin Owens in a WarGames match. He suffered his first pinfall loss on the main roster against Cody Rhodes on the March 27, 2023 episode of Raw. On Night 2 of WrestleMania 39 on April 2, Sikoa helped Reigns retain the Undisputed WWE Universal Championship against Rhodes in the main event. On May 6, at Backlash, Sikoa and The Usos defeated Owens, Sami Zayn and Matt Riddle in a six-man tag team match.

At Night of Champions on May 27, Sikoa and Reigns unsuccessfully challenged Owens and Zayn for the Undisputed WWE Tag Team Championship. During the match, The Usos interfered and accidentally attacked Sikoa while aiming for Zayn, causing Jimmy Uso to attack Reigns and The Usos to walk away from The Bloodline. On the June 2 episode of SmackDown, during Reigns' celebration of 1,000 days as Universal Champion, Sikoa turned on Jimmy and excommunicated him from The Bloodline on Reigns' order for his brother's actions. On the June 16 episode of SmackDown, Sikoa's other brother, Jey, turned on Reigns and Sikoa to side with Jimmy. At Money in the Bank on July 1, Reigns and Sikoa lost to The Usos in a "Bloodline Civil War" tag team match after Jey pinned Reigns.

Sikoa and Jimmy, who had rejoined the stable, entered a feud with a returning John Cena and AJ Styles in September. A tag team match was set between them against Cena and Styles for Fastlane on October 7, however, Styles was removed from the match after a backstage attack by Sikoa, and he was replaced by LA Knight. They lost to Cena and Knight at Fastlane. On the October 20 episode of SmackDown, Cena teased retirement before calling out anyone to face him, leading to Sikoa coming out and brawling with Cena, setting up a match between the two at Crown Jewel on November 4, where Sikoa defeated Cena after nine Samoan Spikes. On Night 2 of WrestleMania XL on April 7, 2024, Sikoa attempted to assist Reigns against Rhodes again, only to be thwarted by a returning Cena, who delivered an Attitude Adjustment to Sikoa through the announce table.

==== Feud with Roman Reigns (2024–2025) ====
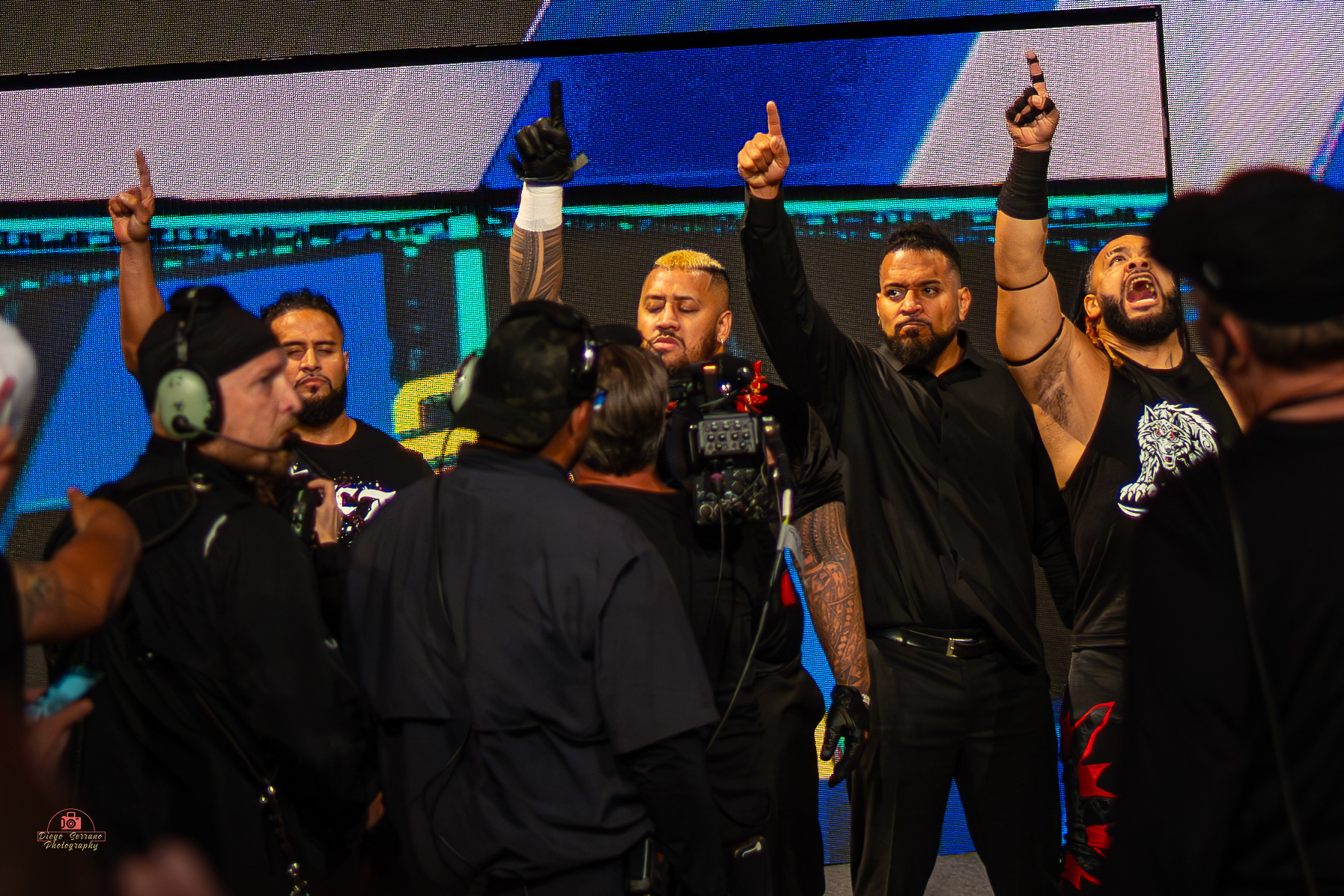
Sikoa (middle) and his Bloodline in June 2024

In the absence of Reigns, Sikoa appointed himself as the de facto leader of The Bloodline, beginning of the hostile takeover of the group. One of the first orders was the expulsion of Jimmy Uso from the group and recruiting Tama Tonga as his right-hand man, much to the fear of Paul Heyman. At Backlash France on May 4, Sikoa and Tonga defeated Randy Orton and Owens in a Tag Team Street Fight with the help of the returning Tonga Loa, who joined the Bloodline. On June 15, Sikoa began a feud with Undisputed WWE Champion Cody Rhodes at Clash at the Castle: Scotland. During the following weeks, Sikoa recruited Jacob Fatu, kicked Heyman out of the stable, and replaced Reigns as the leader and Tribal Chief, revealing that he was in possession of Reigns' Ula Fala. At Money in the Bank on July 6, Sikoa, Tonga and Fatu defeated Rhodes, Orton and Owens after Sikoa pinned Rhodes. At SummerSlam on August 3, Sikoa failed to win the title from Rhodes in a Bloodline Rules match after interference from the returning Reigns. On the September 13 episode of SmackDown, Sikoa again failed to win the title from Rhodes in a steel cage match.

On October 5, at Bad Blood, Sikoa and Fatu lost to Reigns and Rhodes after interference from a returning Jimmy Uso, with Sikoa being pinned by Reigns. At Crown Jewel on November 2, Sikoa, Tonga and Fatu defeated the original incarnation of The Bloodline (Reigns and The Usos), with Sikoa pinning Reigns. At Survivor Series: WarGames on November 30, The Bloodline and Bronson Reed lost to Reigns, The Usos, Zayn and CM Punk in a WarGames match, with Sikoa being pinned by Reigns. Reigns then challenged Sikoa for the Ula Fala and Tribal Chief title in Tribal Combat at the Raw premiere on Netflix on January 6, 2025, which Sikoa lost to end their feud.

==== The MFTs (2025–2026) ====
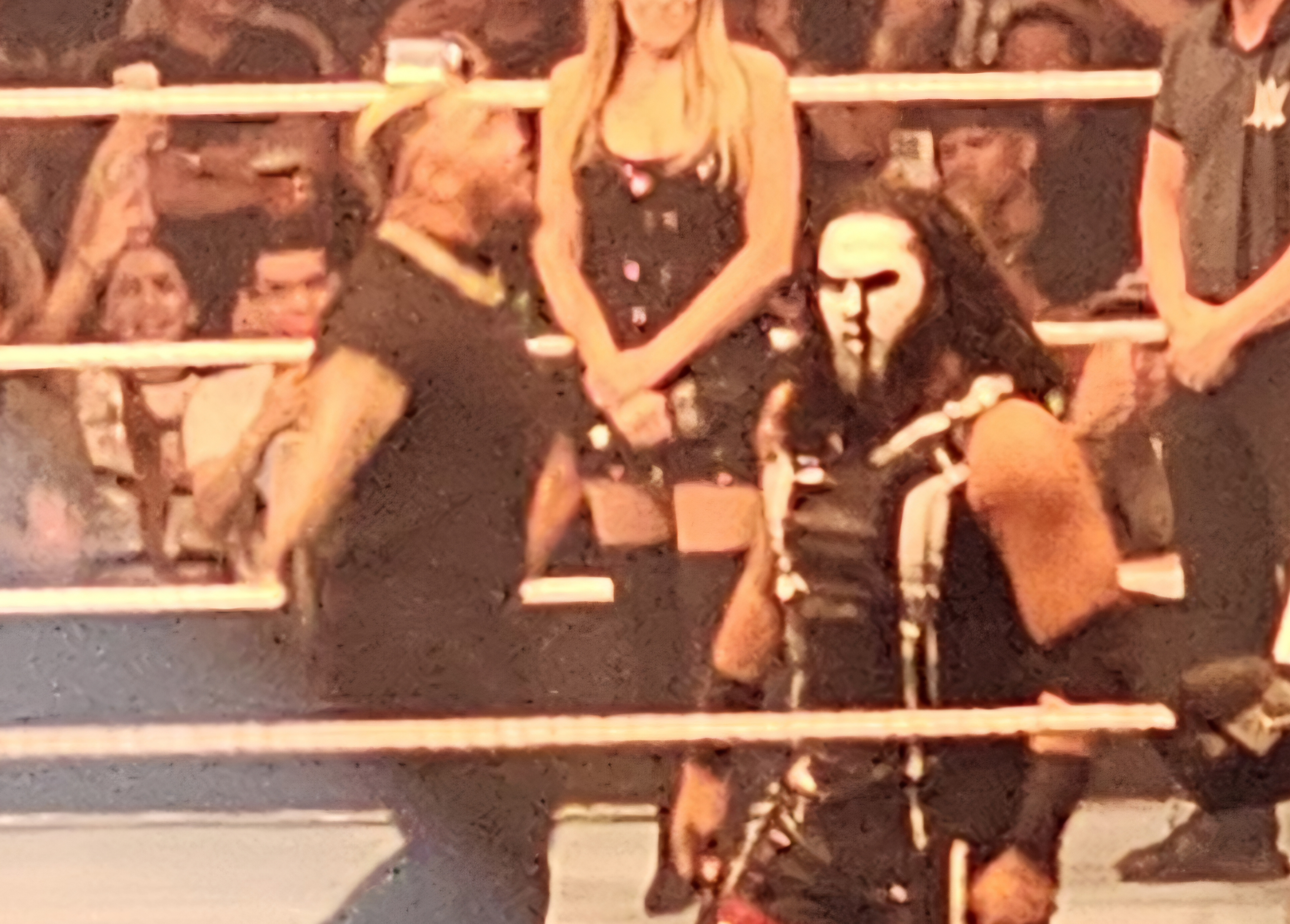
Solo Sikoa and Talla Tonga as the MFTs

Following his loss of the Ula Fala and the "Tribal Chief" title, Sikoa started a feud with Fatu after he won the WWE United States Championship at WrestleMania 41, recruiting JC Mateo into his faction. At Money in the Bank on June 7, Sikoa failed to win the namesake ladder match after Fatu turned on him. At Night of Champions on June 28, Sikoa defeated Fatu to win the championship after interference from Mateo, the returning Tonga Loa and the debuting Talla Tonga reuniting The Tongans stable. Following the event, Sikoa then renamed his Bloodline faction the "MFT" (My Family Tree). At Night 2 of SummerSlam on August 3, Sikoa retained the title against Fatu in a steel cage match. He lost the title to Sami Zayn on the August 29 episode of SmackDown, ending his reign at 62 days.

The feud between Zayn and Sikoa culminated on the November 28 episode of SmackDown (taped one week before) where Sikoa and the MFTs defeated Zayn, Nakamura, Motor City Machine Guns, and Apollo Crews in a Survivor Series tag team elimination match where Sikoa was the sole survivor, only to be taken out by The Wyatt Sicks. On the January 9, 2026 episode of SmackDown, Sikoa stole the lantern of Uncle Howdy and held it hostage for multiple weeks, while he and Tama won the WWE Tag Team Championship by defeating Dexter Lumis and Joe Gacy two weeks later. At the Royal Rumble on January 31, Sikoa entered his first Royal Rumble match at No. 3 being eliminated by Oba Femi. On the March 20 episode of SmackDown, Sikoa had JC Mateo defend the tag titles with Tama on his behalf , but the duo would lose the titles to Damian Priest and R-Truth, ending their reign at 56 days. By that point, relations between Sikoa and the group slowly deteriorated following Tama Tonga's loss to Uncle Howdy on the April 3 episode who he grabbed the lantern and returned it to him afterwards. Then two weeks later on the WrestleMania 42 go home episode of SmackDown on April 17, Sikoa and the MFTs defeated The Wyatt Sicks in an eight-man tag team street fight, ending the feud. On June 23, the stable disbanded when Talla and Tama separated from Sikoa.

==== Re-joining The Bloodline (2026–present) ====
On the July 13 episode of Raw, Sikoa turned face for the first time since 2022 when he came to the aid of Royce Keys, saving him from an attack by Jacob Fatu and Jimmy Uso of the newly reformed Bloodline. At SummerSlam Night 1 on August 1, Sikoa teamed with Keys and LA Knight to defeat The Usos and Fatu in a six-man tag-team match. On the August 10 episode of Raw, Sikoa was defeated by Jey, with the added stipulation of Sikoa being forced to re-join The Bloodline. Despite this loss, Sikoa rejected The Bloodline the following week on Raw by attacking Roman Reigns and The Usos with aid from LA Knight.

After unsuccessfully trying to make amends with his brothers on the September 21 edition of Raw, Sikoa was attacked in a parking lot and then kidnapped (in storyline), by the group known as 946 (Keys, Bronco Nima and Lucien Price). Sikoa returned to TV on the October 5th edition of Raw, aligning with his brothers, to battle 946, but they were unsuccessful as Carmelo Hayes attacked him, and joined 946, on the following episode. The week later, his brothers, Reigns and him brawled with 946, with the latter retreating. After the show went off the air, Reigns and Sikoa reconciled and Sikoa rejoined The Bloodline.

== Personal life ==
Fatu married Almia Williams in 2023 and has two sons.

== Other media ==
=== Video games ===
Year	Title	Ref.
2023	WWE 2K23	
2024	WWE 2K24	
2025	WWE 2K25	
2026	WWE 2K26	

== Filmography ==
Film
Year	Title	Role
2018	Destroyer	Taz

== Championships and accomplishments ==
- Arizona Wrestling Federation
  - AWF Heavyweight Championship (1 time)
- ESPN
  - Best Storyline of the Year (2022) – part of The Bloodline and Sami Zayn
  - Best Storyline of the Year (2023) – part of The Bloodline 2.0
- Future Stars of Wrestling
  - FSW Nevada State Championship (1 time)
- New York Post
  - Storyline of the Year (2022) – part of The Bloodline and Sami Zayn
  - Storyline of the Year (2023)
- Pro Wrestling Illustrated
  - Faction of the Year (2022, 2024) – with The Bloodline
  - Ranked No. 38 of the top 500 singles wrestlers in the PWI 500 in 2023
- Wrestling Observer Newsletter
  - Feud of the Year (2023) as part of The Bloodline vs. Kevin Owens and Sami Zayn
- WWE
  - WWE United States Championship (1 time)
  - WWE Tag Team Championship (1 time) – with Tama Tonga
  - NXT North American Championship (1 time)
