= Lucien Price (wrestler) =

American professional wrestler and former football player (born January 12, 1997)

Personal information
- Born: Nnamdi Oguayo; January 12, 1997 (age 29) Beltsville, Maryland, U.S.

Professional wrestling career
- Ring name(s): Nnamdi Oguayo; Lucien Price
- Billed height: 6 ft 3 in (191 cm)
- Billed weight: 280 lb (127 kg)
- Billed from: Washington, D.C.
- Trained by: WWE Performance Center
- Debut: July 9, 2022

Nnamdi Oguayo (born January 12, 1997) is an American professional wrestler and former football player. He has been signed to WWE since March 2022, where he performs on the Raw brand under the ring name Lucien Price. He is a member of The 946 stable and one-half of the Out The Mud (OTM) tag team alongside Bronco Nima.

Prior to his professional wrestling career, he played college football for the Washington State Cougars.

== Football career ==
Price played high school football at High Point High School in Beltsville, Maryland. He later played for the Washington State Cougars as a Defensive Lineman from 2016 to 2019. In 47 career games, he totaled 106 tackles, 13.5 for loss, 10 sacks, and two forced fumbles.

== Professional wrestling career ==
=== WWE (2022–present) ===
==== NXT (2022–2026) ====
On March 16, 2022, Oguayo signed a developmental contract with WWE and was assigned to the WWE Performance Center. Oguayo made his in-ring debut by participating in a battle royal at an NXT live event on July 9, 2022. Oguayo, going under the ring name Lucien Price, made his television debut by forming the Out The Mud (O.T.M.) tag team with Bronco Nima.

On the January 9, 2024 episode of NXT, OTM would unsuccessfully challenge for the NXT Tag Team Championship against The D'Angelo Family following which Jaida Parker would approach OTM, offering her services to the group which they accepted. OTM would feud with The Family (Tony D'Angelo, Channing "Stacks" Lorenzo, and Adriana Rizzo), leading to a six-person tag team match at NXT Vengeance Day, which The D'Angelo Family won. On the December 24, 2024 episode of NXT, Out The Mud won a fatal four-way tag team match defeating The D'Angelo Family (Channing "Stacks" Lorenzo and Luca Crusifino), No Quarter Catch Crew (Myles Borne and Tavion Heights), and Hank Walker & Tank Ledger to become number one contenders to the NXT Tag Team Championship.

On the January 14, 2025 episode of NXT, Price and Nima unsuccessfully challenged Axiom and Nathan Frazer for the NXT Tag Team Championship. Following the match, the team was written off television due to an injury to Price. Out The Mud returned on the October 14, 2025 episode of NXT, attacking multiple teams during a tag team segment. Following their return, the team resumed regular competition in the tag team division, including wins against Chase U and The Vanity Project on subsequent episodes of NXT. They turned face in January 2026.

==== Raw (2026–present) ====
On the August 24, 2026 episode of Raw, Nima and Price were promoted to the Raw brand as heels, aligning with Royce Keys to attack The Usos, LA Knight and Solo Sikoa during their tag team match establishing themselves as heels in the process. The stable's name was revealed as The 946.
