= Jaida Parker =

American professional wrestler (born 1999)

- Parker in 2025

Personal information
- Born: Tiana Lillian Marie Caffey; February 12, 1999 (age 27) Port St. Lucie, Florida, U.S.
- Relative: Jason Caffey (cousin)

Professional wrestling career
- Ring name(s): Jaida Parker; Tiana Caffey
- Billed height: 5 ft 9 in (175 cm)
- Billed weight: 159 lb (72 kg)
- Billed from: Port St. Lucie, Florida
- Trained by: Sara Del Rey; WWE Performance Center
- Debut: October 28, 2022
Association football career
- Position: Midfielder
Youth career
- Jensen Beach Falcons
- Lakelond FC
- Space Coast United
College career
Years	Team	Apps	(Gls)
2017–2021	LSU Tigers	81	(2)

Tiana Lillian Marie Caffey (born February 12, 1999) is an American professional wrestler and former college soccer player. She is signed to WWE, where she performs on the Raw brand under the ring name Jaida Parker and is a member of The 946 stable.

== Early life ==
Tiana Lillian Marie Caffey was born on February 12, 1999 in Port St. Lucie, Florida. She attended Louisiana State University, where she majored in kinesiology. While at LSU, Caffey played soccer for the Lady Tigers and was called up to play for the United States women's U17 team.

== Professional wrestling career ==
=== WWE (2022–present) ===
==== NXT (2022–2026) ====
On August 16, 2022, Caffey was announced as having signed with WWE as part of the WWE Performance Center along with 16 other recruits. Caffey made her in-ring debut by participating in a battle royal at an NXT live event on October 28. On March 25, 2023, she had her first singles match at an NXT live event in a losing effort to Kayden Carter.

In September 2023, now under the ring name Jaida Parker, she was announced as a participant in the NXT Women's Breakout Tournament, and was defeated in the first round by Karmen Petrovic in her first televised match on the October 17 episode of NXT. On the January 9, 2024 episode of NXT, Parker approached the villainous stable OTM (Out the Mud; Scrypts, Bronco Nima, and Lucien Price), offering her services to the group which they accepted. OTM would feud with The Family (Tony D'Angelo, Channing "Stacks" Lorenzo, and Adriana Rizzo), leading to a six-person tag team match at NXT Vengeance Day, which The D'Angelo Family won. On the February 13 episode of NXT, Parker defeated Rizzo, ending the feud. At NXT Stand & Deliver on April 6, NXT general manager Ava announced the newly created NXT Women's North American Championship, and Parker went through as one of the top 12 participants from the preliminary combine to compete for a spot in the six-woman ladder match to crown the inaugural champion at NXT Battleground. On the May 21 episode of NXT, Parker defeated Brinley Reece to qualify for a spot at NXT Battleground, but failed to win the title at the event. On the August 20 episode of NXT, Parker won a six-woman gauntlet match to earn a match against Roxanne Perez for the NXT Women's Championship at NXT No Mercy. At the event on September 1, Parker failed to win the title from Perez. Soon after, Parker began a feud with Lola Vice, which culminated in an NXT Underground match at NXT Deadline on December 7, where she lost.

On February 1, 2025, Parker competed in the Women's Royal Rumble, entering at #16 before being eliminated by Jordynne Grace. On September 27 at NXT No Mercy, Parker replaced Lainey Reid in the latter's Women's Speed Championship match against Sol Ruca but failed to win the title. On January 13, 2026, after a brief hiatus, Parker returned to NXT as a face, confronting Blake Monroe. Their feud culminated to a Street Fight at NXT Vengeance Day on March 7, where Parker lost to Monroe. In June, Parker began a feud with Nattie being defeated by her on the June 16 episode of NXT. Parker defeated Nattie in a street fight match on the July 21 episode of NXT after Thea Hail threw the towel on behalf of Nattie, who was trapped in a sharpshooter. At NXT Heatwave on August 30, Parker defeated Nattie in a Submission Match ending their feud. On the September 8 episode of NXT, Parker challenged Kelani Jordan for the NXT Women's Championship in a losing effort in what would be her final match in NXT.

==== The 946 (2026–present) ====
On the September 28 episode of Raw, Parker made her official main roster debut and joined "The 946" stable alongside Royce Keys and her former OTM stablemates Lucien Price and Bronco Nima in attacking The Bloodline (Jey Uso, Jimmy Uso, and Jacob Fatu), notably running over Fatu with a car to aid Keys, turning heel in the process.

== Championships and accomplishments ==
- Pro Wrestling Illustrated
  - Ranked No. 63 of the top 250 female wrestlers in the PWI Women's 250 in 2025
