= Powerhouse Hobbs =

American professional wrestler

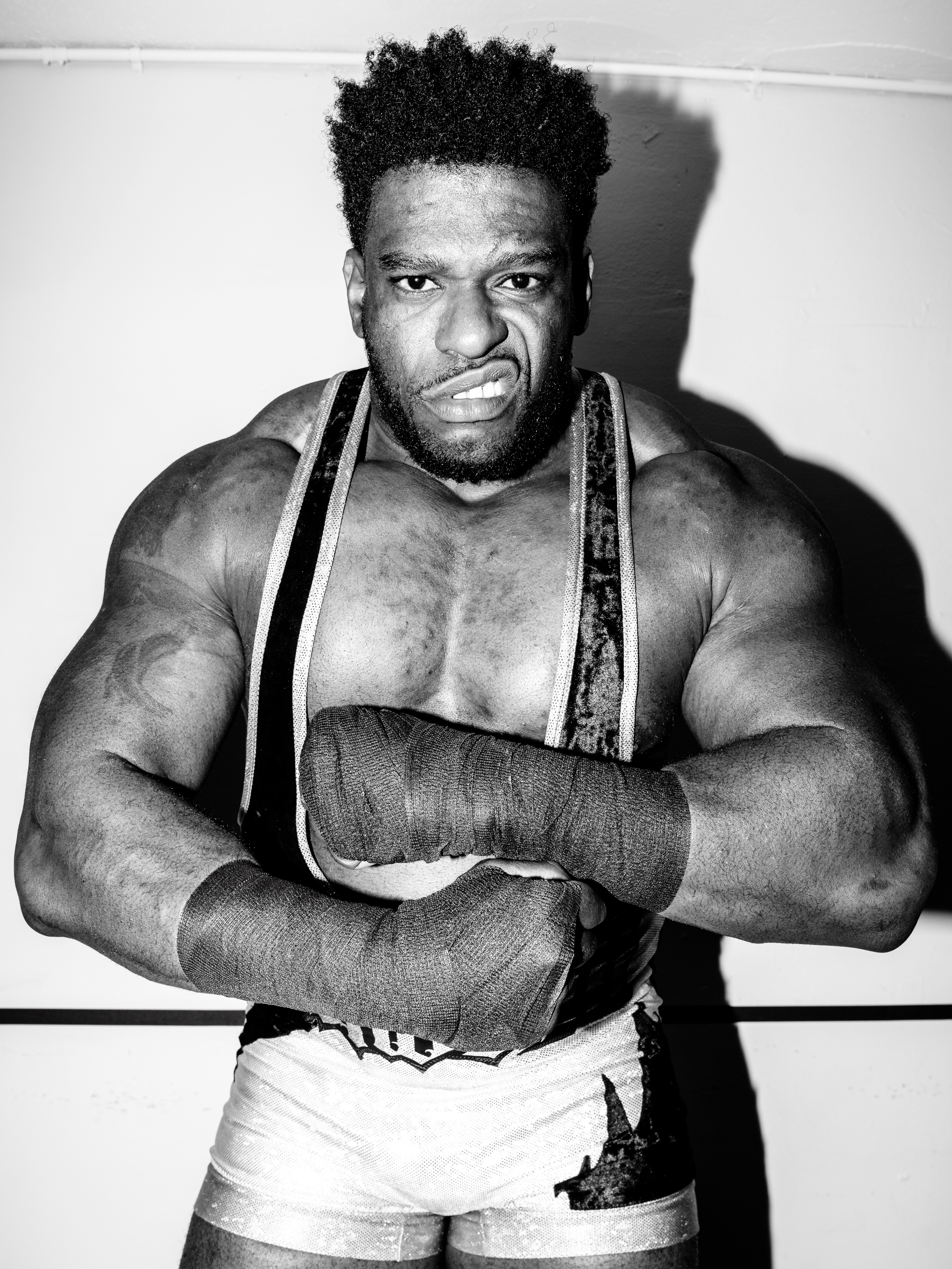
- Keys in 2022

Personal information
- Born: William Hobson East Palo Alto, California, U.S.
- Children: 3

Professional wrestling career
- Ring name(s): Powerhouse Hobbs; Royce Keys; Will Hobbs; Will.I.IS; Will Rood
- Billed height: 6 ft 3 in (191 cm)
- Billed weight: 270 lb (122 kg)
- Billed from: East Palo Alto, California, U.S.
- Trained by: APW Boot Camp; Donovan Morgan; Ezekiel Jackson; Frank Murdoch; Michael Modest; Roland Alexander
- Debut: July 18, 2009

William Hobson is an American professional wrestler. As of January 2026, he is signed to WWE, where he performs on the Raw brand under the ring name Royce Keys and is the leader of The 946 stable.

Hobson is also known for his 2020 to 2026 tenure with All Elite Wrestling (AEW) under the ring name Powerhouse Hobbs, where he was a one-time AEW TNT Champion and one-time AEW World Trios Champion.

== Early life ==
William Hobson was born in East Palo Alto, California. He attended Sequoia High School in Redwood City, California, where he played football and other sports. As a youth, he attended professional wrestling events, including SuperBrawl VIII in the Cow Palace in San Francisco, California. Hobson was raised by his grandparents, and has said that his love of professional wrestling came through his grandparents who regularly watched and attended wrestling shows at the Cow Palace. Hobson's older brother was killed by gunfire; they had aspirations of being a manager-wrestler duo in professional wrestling. Hobson was also injured in the shooting, taking a bullet in his forearm.

== Professional wrestling career ==
=== Early career (2009–2020) ===
Hobson attended the All Pro Wrestling (APW) professional wrestling school in Hayward, California. He made his professional wrestling debut on July 18, 2009, at APW's "Gym Wars" event under the ring name "Will Rood". Hobson wrestled for APW over the following decade, during which time he held the APW Worldwide Internet Championship three times. He also held the APW Tag Team Championship thrice, teaming with Marcus Lewis as "Lion Power". In 2014 he briefly used the ring name "Will.I.IS"; in 2016 he changed his ring name to "Will Hobbs".

Between 2011 and 2020 Hobson also appeared with multiple independent promotions, principally in the San Francisco Bay Area. These included Championship Wrestling from Hollywood (where he held the UWN Tag Team Championship with Damien Grundy as "Cold Cold War"), Gold Rush Pro Wrestling (where he held the GRPW Dynamite Division Championship), and Pro Championship Wrestling (where he held the PCW Tag Team Championship with Mitch Valentine as the "Dream Team").

In 2016, Hobson had a try-out with WWE, losing to Baron Corbin in a dark match in the SAP Center in San Jose, California. Hobson also attended the WWE Performance Center, where he took part in a promo class. Hobson was ultimately not offered a contract with WWE.

=== All Elite Wrestling (2020–2026) ===
==== Team Taz (2020–2022) ====
In July 2020, Hobson began to work for All Elite Wrestling (AEW) as "Will Hobbs", wrestling on its YouTube show AEW Dark. On September 5, 2020, Hobbs competed in a 21-man Casino Battle Royale at the All Out pay-per-view, which was won by Lance Archer. His performance in the match impressed AEW president Tony Khan, and he was signed to a contract with AEW. On the September 16, 2020 episode of Dynamite, Hobbs saved AEW World Champion Jon Moxley from an attack by Brian Cage and Ricky Starks. On the October 7 episode of Dynamite, Hobbs unsuccessfully challenged Cage for the FTW Championship. On the November 18 episode of Dynamite, Hobbs turned heel by aligning himself with Team Taz (Taz, Brian Cage, and Ricky Starks), joining them in an attack on Cody Rhodes and Darby Allin. Later that month, his ring name was tweaked to "Powerhouse Hobbs". At the December 2, 2020 television special Winter Is Coming, Hobbs and Starks lost to Rhodes and Allin.

Throughout early 2021, Hobbs scored a series of singles and tag team victories on episodes of AEW Dark and AEW Dark: Elevation. At the Double or Nothing pay-per-view in May 2021, Hobbs competed in a Casino Battle Royale that was won by Jungle Boy. On July 14, 2021, on the Fyter Fest television special, Hobbs aided stablemate Ricky Starks in an FTW Championship victory over Brian Cage, thus expelling Cage from Team Taz; Hobbs went on to defeat Cage on the September 1 episode of Dynamite. On the September 15, 2021 episode of Dynamite, Team Taz attacked CM Punk while he was on commentary, resulting in a match between Hobbs and Punk at the AEW Grand Slam television special (Punk's first televised match in over seven years), which was won by Punk. For the remainder of the year, Hobbs wrestled primarily on AEW Dark.

In March 2022 at Revolution, Hobbs competed in a Face of the Revolution ladder match that was won by Wardlow. Throughout mid-2022, he largely competed in tag team matches alongside Starks; at Double or Nothing in May 2022 they unsuccessfully challenged Jurassic Express for the AEW World Tag Team Championship in a triple threat match that also featured Keith Lee and Swerve Strickland. At Dynamite: Fight for the Fallen on July 27, 2022, Hobbs turned on Starks after Starks lost the FTW Championship, delivering a clothesline to the back of Starks' neck followed by a spinebuster. The following week, Taz disbanded Team Taz. At All Out in September 2022, Hobbs defeated Starks; later that month, on Grand Slam, Starks defeated Hobbs in a lights out match.

==== Various feuds (2022–2025) ====
At Full Gear in November 2022, Hobbs faced Samoa Joe and Wardlow in a three-way dance for the AEW TNT Championship that was won by Samoa Joe. In March 2023, Hobbs won a Face of the Revolution ladder match, giving him a shot at the TNT Championship. On the following episode of Dynamite, Hobbs (with assistance from Q. T. Marshall) defeated Wardlow in a falls count anywhere match to win the TNT Championship. Hobbs subsequently joined Marshall's "QTV" stable. On the April 19, 2023 episode of Dynamite, Wardlow defeated Hobbs to regain the TNT Championship. In July 2023, Hobbs left QTV.

In July 2023, Hobbs competed in the Owen Hart Foundation Tournament, defeating Dustin Rhodes in the quarter-finals before losing to Ricky Starks in the semi-finals of the tournament. At All Out in September 2023, Hobbs lost to Miro. In October 2023, Hobbs joined the Don Callis Family, attacking Chris Jericho and Kenny Omega. In November 2023, the Don Callis Family (Hobbs, Konosuke Takeshita, and Kyle Fletcher) and Brian Cage lost to Jericho, Omega, Kota Ibushi, and Paul Wight in a street fight. At Worlds End the following month, Hobbs, Takeshita, Big Bill and Ricky Starks lost to Jericho, Darby Allin, Sammy Guevara, and Sting. On the April 24, 2024 episode of Dynamite, Hobbs unsuccessfully challenged Jon Moxley for the IWGP World Heavyweight Championship. Hobbs sustained a knee injury during the match that required surgery.

On the November 6, 2024, episode of Dynamite, Hobbs returned as a mystery partner for Ricochet, defeating Konosuke Takeshita and Kyle Fletcher, turning face and ending his tenure with the Don Callis Family. On December 28 at Worlds End, Hobbs unsuccessfully challenged Takeshita for the AEW International Championship. On the January 8, 2025 episode of Dynamite, Hobbs won a Casino Gauntlet match to earn a match against Jon Moxley for the AEW World Championship, but failed to win the title the following week at Dynamite: Maximum Carnage. After losing to Moxley, Hobbs began a feud with Big Bill of The Learning Tree. On the February 19 episode of Dynamite, Hobbs defeated Bill in a street fight.

==== The Opps; departure (2025–2026) ====
In April 2025 at Dynamite: Spring BreakThru, Hobbs (substituting for the injured Hook) teamed with The Opps (Katsuyori Shibata and Samoa Joe) to defeat the Death Riders for the AEW World Trios Championship. The next night at Collision: Spring BreakThru, Hobbs was inducted as a member of The Opps. On May 25 at Double or Nothing, The Opps teamed with Kenny Omega, Swerve Strickland, and Willow Nightingale to defeat the Death Riders and The Young Bucks in an Anarchy in the Arena match. On July 12 at All In: Texas, The Opps successfully defended their titles against the Death Riders and Gabe Kidd. On August 24 at Forbidden Door Zero Hour, The Opps successfully defended their titles against Bullet Club War Dogs.

On October 18 at WrestleDream, The Opps attacked "Hangman" Adam Page after Joe failed to defeat Page for the AEW World Championship, turning heel in the process. On January 14, 2026 taping of Collision: Maximum Carnage, the Opps lost the AEW World Trios Championship to Page and JetSpeed in a bout which aired on tape delay on January 17. This was Hobbs' final AEW appearance as his contract expired on January 15 and he elected not to re-sign, ending his near six-year tenure with AEW.

=== WWE (2026–present) ===
Immediately after departing AEW, Hobson signed a contract with WWE. On January 31, 2026 at Royal Rumble, Hobson–wrestling under the ring name Royce Keys–entered the Royal Rumble match at #14 and went on to eliminate Damian Priest, before being eliminated by Bronson Reed. After mainly performing in dark matches in February, March, and early April, Keys made his SmackDown debut on April 10, defeating Berto in a squash match and was later assigned to the SmackDown brand. On the April 17 episode of SmackDown, he won the André the Giant Memorial Battle Royal by last eliminating Talla Tonga. At Night 1 of SummerSlam on August 1, Keys teamed with Solo Sikoa and LA Knight to defeat Jacob Fatu and The Usos (Jey Uso and Jimmy Uso). In the following months, Keys would turn heel and form "The 946" stable with OTM (Bronco Nima and Lucien Price), Jaida Parker, Carmelo Hayes, and Cruz Montana to feud with Knight and The Bloodline (Jacob Fatu, Jey Uso Jimmy Uso, Roman Reigns and Solo Sikoa) while also transferring to the Raw brand.

== Professional wrestling style and persona ==
Hobson wrestles in a powerhouse style. His finishing moves have included a falling powerslam named the "World's Most Dangerous Slam", a spinebuster named the "Last Testament Spinebuster", an Oklahoma Stampede, a frog splash, a torture rack, a burning hammer, and an emerald flowsion named the "Town Business". His ring name in WWE, Royce Keys, is a tribute to his youngest son, Royce, and his mother's maiden name, Keys.

== Other media ==
=== Filmography ===
Year	Title	Role	Notes
2021	Rhodes To The Top	Himself	Episode: "Double of Nothing"
2026	Agent of Shadows	Double-Fist Joe	Microdrama series; acting debut

=== Video games ===
Trick Williams in video games
Year	Title	Ref.	Notes
2023	AEW Fight Forever		Video game debut

== Personal life ==
Hobson has two sons and one daughter.

== Championships and accomplishments ==
- All Elite Wrestling
  - AEW TNT Championship (1 time)
  - AEW World Trios Championship (1 time) – with Katsuyori Shibata and Samoa Joe
  - Face of the Revolution ladder match (2023)
- All Pro Wrestling
  - APW Tag Team Championship (3 times) – with Marcus Lewis
  - APW Worldwide Internet Championship (3 times)
- Championship Wrestling from Hollywood
  - UWN Tag Team Championship (1 time) – with Damien Grundy
- Gold Rush Pro Wrestling
  - GRPW Dynamite Division Championship (1 time)
  - GRPW Dynamite Division Championship Tournament (2013)
- Pro Championship Wrestling
  - PCW Tag Team Championship (1 time) – with Mitch Valentine
- Pro Wrestling Illustrated
  - Ranked No. 93 of the top 500 singles wrestlers in the PWI 500 in 2021
- WWE
  - André the Giant Memorial Battle Royal (2026)
