= Bronco Nima =

American professional wrestler

Personal information
- Born: Edwin Grande; May 20, 1998 (age 28) Oakland, California, U.S.

Professional wrestling career
- Ring name(s): Edwin Grande; Bronco Nima
- Billed height: 6 ft 5 in (196 cm)
- Billed weight: 299 lb (136 kg)
- Billed from: Oakland, California
- Trained by: WWE Performance Center
- Debut: 2022

Edwin Grande (born May 20, 1998) is an American professional wrestler. He is signed to WWE, where he performs on the Raw brand under the ring name Bronco Nima. He is a member of The 946 stable and one-half of the Out the Mud (OTM) tag team alongside Lucien Price.

== Early life ==
Grande was born in Oakland, California. Prior to professional wrestling, he played American football as an offensive lineman.

He attended Monterey Peninsula College before transferring to the University of Idaho, signing with the program in 2018 as part of their recruiting class.

== Professional wrestling career ==
=== WWE (2022–present) ===
==== NXT (2022–2026) ====
Grande signed with WWE in 2022 and began training at the WWE Performance Center. He made his televised debut as Bronco Nima on the August 12, 2022 episode of NXT Level Up, teaming with Lucien Price in a loss to Andre Chase and Bodhi Hayward.

On the July 18, 2023 episode of NXT, Nima alongside Price made his NXT debut against Scrypts and Axiom, Scrypts turned on Axiom and aligned himself with Bronco Nima and Lucien Price, turning heel thus creating the stable Out The Mud (O.T.M.).

On the January 9, 2024 episode of NXT, Nima with Price would unsuccessfully challenge for the NXT Tag Team Championship against The D'Angelo Family following which Jaida Parker would approach OTM, offering her services to the group which they accepted. OTM would feud with The Family (Tony D'Angelo, Channing "Stacks" Lorenzo, and Adriana Rizzo), leading to a six-person tag team match at NXT Vengeance Day, which The D'Angelo Family won. On the December 24, 2024 episode of NXT, Out The Mud won a fatal four-way tag team match defeating The D'Angelo Family (Channing "Stacks" Lorenzo and Luca Crusifino), No Quarter Catch Crew (Myles Borne and Tavion Heights), and Hank Walker & Tank Ledger to become number one contenders to the NXT Tag Team Championship.

On the January 14, 2025 episode of NXT, Nima and Price unsuccessfully challenged Axiom and Nathan Frazer for the NXT Tag Team Championship. Following the match, the team was written off television due to an injury to Price. Out The Mud returned on the October 14, 2025 episode of NXT, attacking multiple teams during a tag team segment. Following their return, the team resumed regular competition in the tag team division, including wins against Chase U and The Vanity Project on subsequent episodes of NXT.

On the January 13 2026, they turned face due to great fan reactions and they acted less heelish. Nima would unsuccessfully challenge for the NXT Tag Team Championship against DarkState on January 27, 2026. On the March 31, 2026 episode of NXT, Nima teamed with Price and Mike Santana in a six-man tag team match victory over DarkState (Dion Lennox, Osiris Griffin and Saquon Shugars).

==== Raw (2026–present) ====
On the August 24, 2026, episode of Raw, Nima and Price were promoted to the Raw brand as heels, aligning with the returning Royce Keys to attack The Usos, Solo Sikoa and LA Knight during their tag team match. The stable revealed its name as "946" on September 4.

=== Lucha Libre AAA Worldwide (2026) ===
On the June 20, 2026, episode of Lucha Libre AAA, Nima appeared as a member of the revival of Los Perros del Mal with Daga, Berto, Angel, and Karmen Petrovic. All members came to the ring and attacked El Grande Americano. On the August 22 episode, Nima faced former Perros del Mal member Penta, where had Nima won, Penta would have been forced to re-join the stable. After Nima failed to defeat Penta, his stablemates attacked him, effectively kicking him out of the group.
