= Jacob Fatu =

American professional wrestler (born 1992)

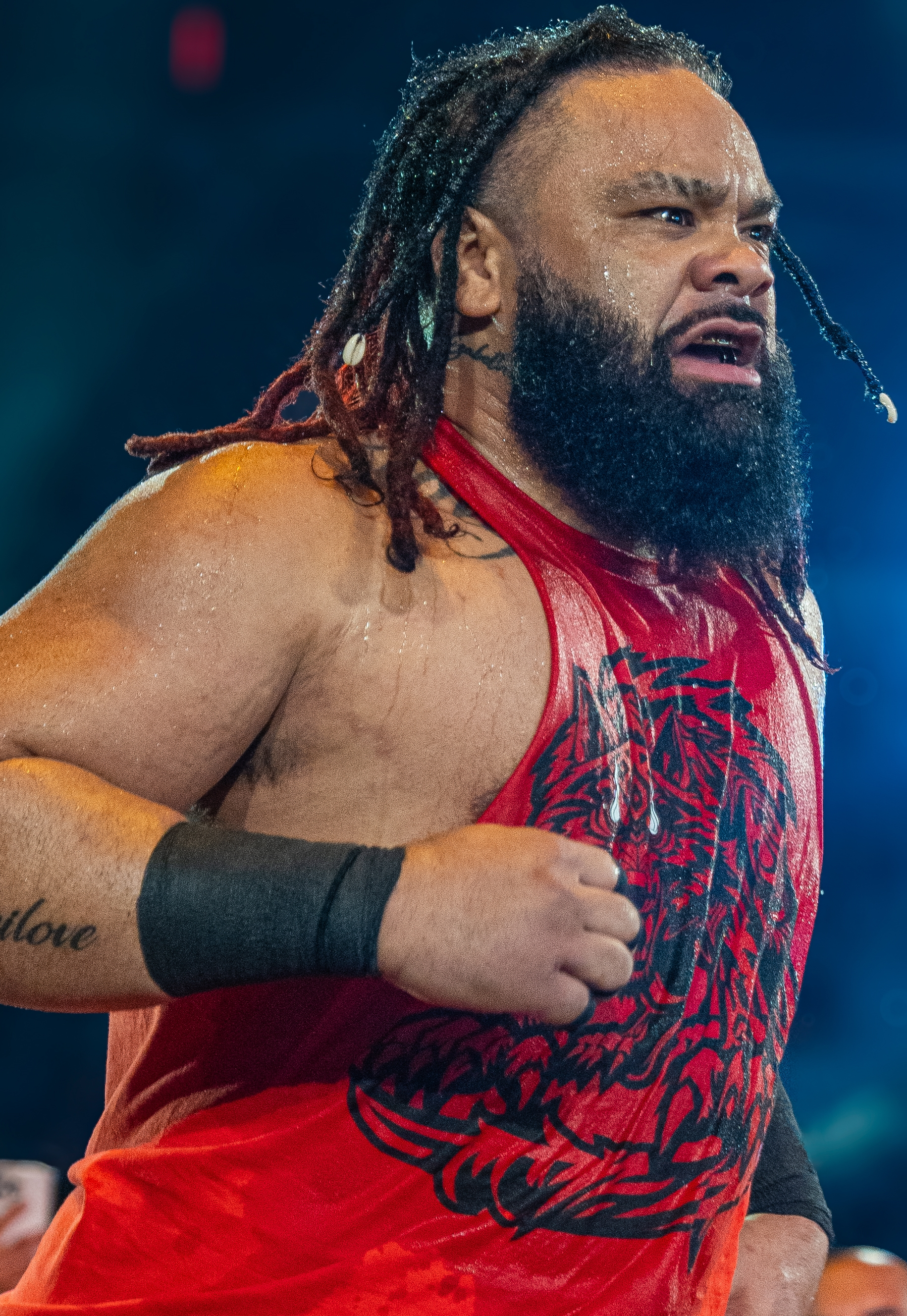
- Fatu in 2025

Personal information
- Born: April 18, 1992 (age 34) Sacramento, California, U.S.
- Spouse: Elizabeth Fatu (m. 2008)
- Children: 7
- Parent: Sam Fatu (father)
- Family: Anoaʻi

Professional wrestling career
- Ring name(s): Fatu; Jacob Fatu
- Billed height: 6 ft 2 in (188 cm)
- Billed weight: 285 lb (129 kg)
- Billed from: Samoa; Sacramento, California
- Trained by: Rikishi; Black Pearl; Gangrel; Sinn Bodhi
- Debut: September 22, 2012

Jacob Fatu (born April 18, 1992) is an American professional wrestler. He is signed to WWE, where he performs on the Raw brand and is a member of The Bloodline stable.

Fatu made his professional wrestling debut in 2012, performing in various independent promotions including All Pro Wrestling, DEFY Wrestling, Game Changer Wrestling, House of Glory, and PCW Ultra. In 2019, he signed with Major League Wrestling (MLW), where he won the MLW World Heavyweight Championship, the MLW National Openweight Championship, and the fourth Battle Riot in 2022. His 819-day reign as MLW World Heavyweight Champion is the longest in the promotion's history. In 2024, Fatu signed with WWE and debuted as part of The Bloodline stable. During the following year, he won the WWE Tag Team Championship and the WWE United States Championship at WrestleMania 41.

Fatu is part of the Anoaʻi family of professional wrestlers. He is the son of Sam Fatu, best known as Tama and Tonga Kid.

== Early life ==
Jacob Fatu was born into the Anoaʻi family of Samoan wrestlers, which includes his father Samuel and younger brother Journey. He attended Rosemont High School in Sacramento, where he played football and graduated in 2008. At the age of 18, Fatu was arrested for robbery, and he credits seeing his cousins Jonathan and Joshua on a jail TV as his inspiration for becoming a wrestler.

== Professional wrestling career ==
=== Early career (2012–2015) ===
Fatu made his in-ring debut on September 22, 2012, at the KnokX Pro Academy, teaming with relative Black Pearl to defeat The Profilers (Maverick and Zander Jones). Shortly after, he formed an alliance with Gangrel, which ended on December 15 when Gangrel turned on Fatu during a tag team match. Since his alliance with Gangrel, who portrayed a vampire, he began to use the nickname "The Samoan Werewolf". In early 2013, Fatu began teaming with The Hillbilly Hero, before joining Black Pearl and his uncle Rikishi in July to form The Samoan Dynasty. He continued wrestling exclusively at the academy until December 12, 2015, after which he left to compete on the independent circuit.

Prior to signing with WWE in 2024, Fatu participated in a WWE tryout in September 2016.

=== Independent circuit (2016–2024) ===
Fatu debuted for All Pro Wrestling (APW) on July 9, 2016, defeating Will Hobbs. On August 20, Fatu defeated Jorel Nelson in his first match for Pacific Coast Wrestling (PCW). He signed with PCW on October 24. On January 20, 2017, Fatu and The Almighty Sheik defeated Dom Vitalli and MVP to win the PCW Ultra Tag Team Championship. Throughout 2018, they successfully defended the titles on several pay-per-views against the teams of Jimmy Jacobs and Joey Janela, Bestia 666 and Damián 666, the Crist Brothers, Reno Scum, and Abyss and Sinn Bodhi. That same year, Fatu wrestled three times for The Crash in Mexico, each time teaming with La Rebelión Amarilla (Garza Jr. and Mr. 450) in a trios match. Despite losing to Blue Demon Jr. and Octagón in the first match, Fatu's team won the next two, defeating Nueva Generación Dinamita (El Cuatrero, Forastero and Sansón) and Los Guerreros Laguneros (Euforia, Gran Guerrero and Último Guerrero), respectively.

On November 2, Fatu defeated Jeff Cobb to win the APW Universal Heavyweight Championship. He appeared for Game Changer Wrestling (GCW) at Janela's L.A. Confidential show on November 16, defeating KTB. On April 6, 2019, Fatu won a six-pack challenge at The Wrestling Revolver's Pancakes & Piledrivers 3 event. He lost the APW Universal Heavyweight Championship to Jake Atlas on August 2. At Ric Flair's Last Match on July 31, 2022, Fatu challenged Josh Alexander for the Impact World Championship, but the match ended in a no contest after interference from Brian Myers, Matt Cardona and Mark Sterling.

Fatu appeared for House of Glory on August 28 at High Intensity, competing in a tournament final for the vacant House of Glory Heavyweight Championship. The match was called off due to a brawl between both men, leading to a tag team match where Fatu and Amazing Red defeated King and Malakai Black via disqualification. On October 22, Fatu defeated Alexander Hammerstone to win the PCW Ultra Heavyweight Championship. He then defeated Carlos Ramirez the following week at Exodus to win the vacant title, becoming a double champion. He lost the title to Matt Cardona on May 19, 2023, at Beware The Fury. He wrestled his final match on the independent circuit for GCW on March 24, 2024, at The Block is Hot, teaming with Zilla Fatu to defeat Gringo Loco and Oni El Bendito. In April, Fatu vacated the PCW Ultra Heavyweight Championship, as well as the PCW Ultra Tag Team Championship in June.

=== Major League Wrestling (2019–2024) ===
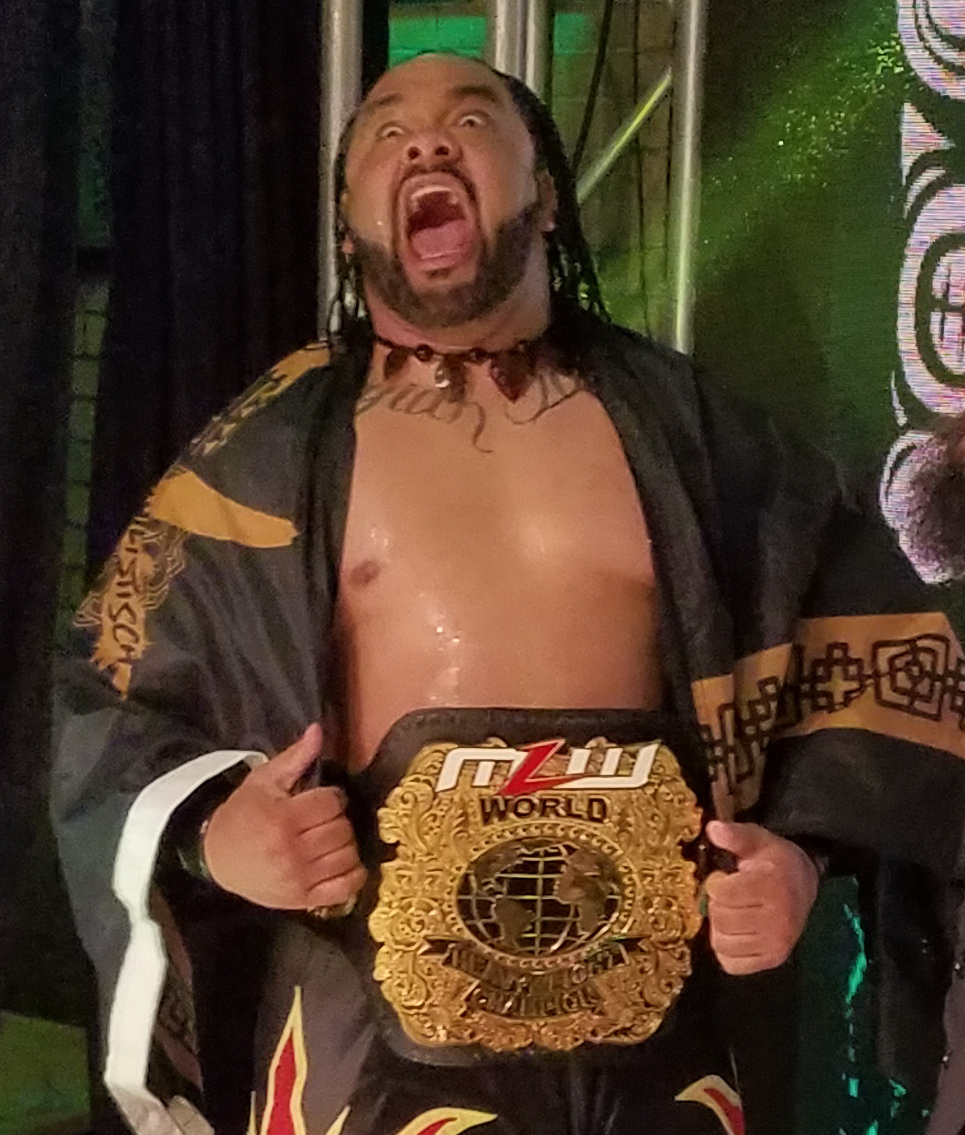
Fatu as the MLW World Heavyweight Champion in November 2019

On January 17, 2019, Fatu signed with Major League Wrestling (MLW), joining his relatives Samu and Lance Anoaʻi in the company. On February 2, Fatu debuted for MLW at their SuperFight event in a non-televised match. Fatu and frequent tag team partner Josef Samael made their televised debut at Intimidation Games on March 2, attacking MLW World Heavyweight Champion Tom Lawlor following his steel cage match against Low Ki, forming the heel stable Contra Unit with Simon Gotch.

At Kings of Colosseum on July 6, Fatu defeated Lawlor to win the MLW World Heavyweight Championship. He retained the title in a rematch against Lawlor on the August 31 episode of Fusion. On November 2, Fatu headlined MLW's inaugural pay-per-view, Saturday Night SuperFight, defeating L.A. Park to retain the title. Throughout his reign, Fatu successfully defended the title against the likes of Brian Pillman Jr., Davey Boy Smith Jr., ACH, Jordan Oliver, Calvin Tankman, and Matt Cross. In September 2021, Fatu was challenged for the title by Alexander Hammerstone, who put his MLW National Openweight Championship on the line in a winner takes all match. At Fightland on October 7, Fatu lost the World Heavyweight Championship to Hammerstone, ending his reign at 819 days. On November 17, at War Chamber, Contra Unit lost to Hammerstone's team in a War Chamber match.

Fatu then began feuding with fellow Contra Unit members Mads Krule Krügger and Ikuro Kwon and repackaged himself through a series of vignettes, turning face. Throughout early 2022, Fatu and Krügger traded victories against each other on Fusion. At Intimidation Games on April 28, Fatu failed to regain the MLW World Heavyweight Championship in a triple threat match also involving Krügger. Their feud culminated in a Weapons of Mass Destruction match at Kings of Colosseum on July 14, which Fatu won. At Battle Riot IV on November 3, Fatu won the 40-man Battle Riot match, earning the Golden Ticket which required him to cash-in for an MLW World Heavyweight Championship match anytime and anywhere. He received his title match against Hammerstone on the March 21, 2023 episode of Fusion, but lost.

At War Chamber on April 6, Fatu defeated John Hennigan to win the MLW National Openweight Championship. He lost the title to Rickey Shane Page at Fury Road on September 3. On February 1, 2024, Rikishi announced that Fatu was now a free agent, ending his five-year tenure with the company. He made his final appearance for MLW on February 17, where he was defeated by Krügger in a Baleki Brawl match.

=== New Japan Pro-Wrestling (2024) ===
On January 13, 2024, Fatu made his debut for New Japan Pro-Wrestling (NJPW) at Battle in the Valley, teaming with Fred Rosser and Shota Umino to defeat Team Filthy (Lawlor and West Coast Wrecking Crew (Jorel Nelson and Royce Isaacs) in a six-man tag team match.

=== WWE (2024–present) ===
==== The Bloodline (2024–2025) ====
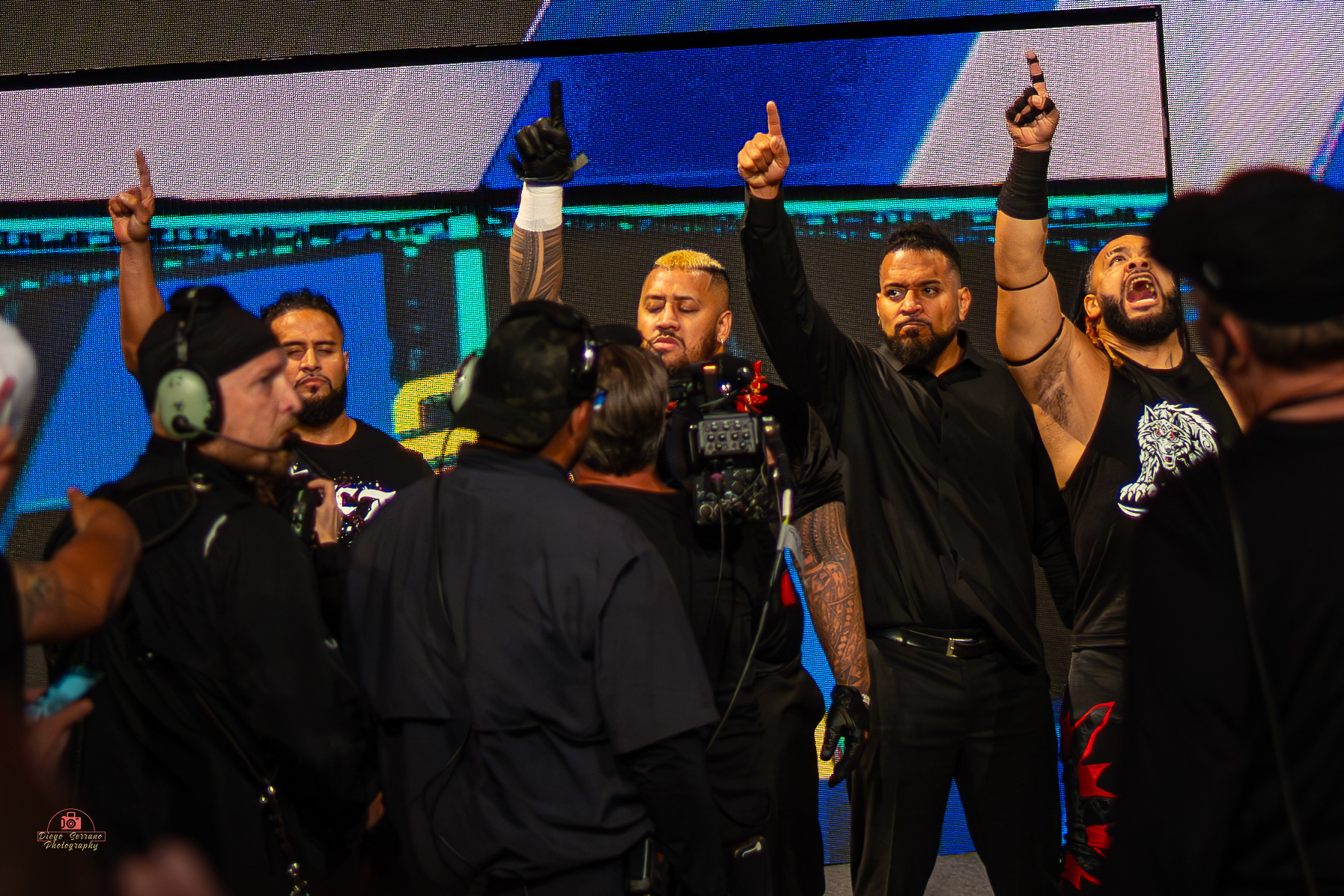
Fatu (far right) as the enforcer of Solo Sikoa's Bloodline in June 2024

On April 7, 2024, it was reported that Fatu had signed with WWE. Fatu made his debut on the June 21 episode of SmackDown, attacking Randy Orton, Kevin Owens and Undisputed WWE Champion Cody Rhodes, establishing himself as a heel and joining The Bloodline, led by his real life cousin Solo Sikoa. At Money in the Bank on July 6, Fatu made his in-ring debut in a six-man tag team match alongside Sikoa and Tama Tonga, defeating Rhodes, Orton and Owens. On the August 2 episode of SmackDown, Fatu and Tonga defeated DIY (Johnny Gargano and Tommaso Ciampa) to win the WWE Tag Team Championship, his first championship win in WWE. Later that month, Fatu relinquished one half of the titles to Tonga Loa so that he could be Sikoa's personal enforcer. At Bad Blood on October 5, Fatu and Sikoa lost to Roman Reigns and Rhodes after interference from a returning Jimmy Uso, marking his first loss in WWE. At Crown Jewel on November 2, Fatu, Tonga and Sikoa defeated the original incarnation of The Bloodline (Reigns and The Usos) in a six-man tag team match. At Survivor Series: WarGames on November 30, Fatu, along with The Bloodline and Bronson Reed, lost to Reigns, The Usos, Sami Zayn and CM Punk in a WarGames match.

In January 2025, after Sikoa lost the Ula Fala and Tribal Chief title to Reigns, Fatu began a feud with Braun Strowman. At Saturday Night's Main Event on January 25, Fatu lost to Strowman via disqualification after shoving a referee. On February 1, at Royal Rumble, Fatu made his Royal Rumble match debut at number 12, eliminating four wrestlers before being eliminated by Strowman. Their feud culminated in a Last Man Standing match on the April 4 episode of SmackDown, which Fatu won. On Night 1 of WrestleMania 41 on April 19, Fatu defeated LA Knight to win the WWE United States Championship, marking his first singles championship in WWE. At Backlash on May 10, Fatu successfully defended his title against Knight, Damian Priest and Drew McIntyre in a fatal four-way match with assistance from a debuting JC Mateo.

==== Singles competition (2025–2026) ====
Following weeks of dissension, Fatu betrayed Sikoa at Money at the Bank on June 7 by attacking him in the namesake ladder match, leaving The Bloodline and turning face. At Night of Champions on June 28, Fatu lost the United States Championship to Sikoa after interference from Mateo, a returning Tonga Loa, and the debuting Talla Tonga, ending his reign at 70 days. On Night 2 of SummerSlam on August 3, Fatu failed to regain the title from Sikoa in a steel cage match. On the October 17 episode of SmackDown, Fatu was originally scheduled to face Drew McIntyre in a number one contender's match to face Undisputed WWE Champion Cody Rhodes, however Fatu was, in storyline, attacked backstage and was medically unable to compete. This was done to write Fatu off television due to an undisclosed injury.

Fatu returned on the January 9, 2026 episode of SmackDown during the Undisputed WWE Championship match, where he attacked McIntyre before assaulting Rhodes, which allowed McIntyre to capitalize and win the title, after which Fatu was taken out by Rhodes in retaliation for costing him the title. At WrestleMania 42 Night 1 on April 18, Fatu defeated McIntyre in an Unsanctioned match, ending their feud.

==== Re-joining The Bloodline (2026–present) ====
After WrestleMania, Fatu faced Roman Reigns for the World Heavyweight Chamionship at Backlash and Clash in Italy, but was defeated both times. The second loss came in a Tribal Combat and Fatu was forced to acknowledge Reigns as his Tribal Chief, aligning himself with the latter and The Usos. On the June 15 episode of Raw, Reigns included Fatu as part of the family by giving him an Ula Fala, adding him to The Bloodline. At Night 1 of SummerSlam on August 1, Fatu and The Usos lost to LA Knight, Royce Keys and Solo Sikoa in a Six-Man Tag Team Match.

== Other media ==
=== Video games ===
Year	Title	Notes
2025	WWE 2K25	Video game debut
2026	WWE 2K26	

=== Filmography ===
Year	Title	Role	Notes
2026	Agent of Shadows	The Cloak	Microdrama series; acting debut

== Personal life ==
Fatu is married to Elizabeth, and they have seven children together. He is a supporter of the Las Vegas Raiders.

== Championships and accomplishments ==
- All Pro Wrestling
  - APW Universal Heavyweight Championship (1 time)
  - APW Worldwide Internet Championship (1 time)
  - APW Tag Team Championship (1 time) – with Josef Samael
- DEFY Wrestling
  - DEFY Tag Team Championship (1 time) – with The Almighty Sheik
- ESPN
  - Debut of the Year (2024)
- International Wrestling Courage
  - IWC Heavyweight Championship (1 time)
- House of Glory
  - House of Glory Heavyweight Championship (1 time)
- Phoenix Pro Wrestling
  - PPW Heavyweight Championship (1 time)
- LIT Wrestling
  - LIT Knuck If Ya Buck Championship (1 time, inaugural)
- Major League Wrestling
  - MLW World Heavyweight Championship (1 time)
  - MLW National Openweight Championship (1 time)
  - Battle Riot (2022)
- Pacific Coast Wrestling/PCW Ultra
  - PCW ULTRA Heavyweight Championship (1 time)
  - PCW ULTRA Tag Team Championship (1 time, final) – with Brody King and The Almighty Sheik
- Pro Wrestling Illustrated
  - Faction of the Year (2024) – with The Bloodline
  - Ranked No. 20 of the top 500 singles wrestlers in the PWI 500 in 2020 and 2025
- Stars Of Wrestling
  - SOW World Heavyweight Championship (1 time)
- Supreme Pro Wrestling
  - SPW Tag Team Championship (1 time) – with Journey Fatu
- West Coast Pro Wrestling
  - WCPW Heavyweight Championship (1 time)
- WWE
  - WWE United States Championship (1 time)
  - WWE Tag Team Championship (1 time) – with Tama Tonga
