= The Bloodline =

Professional wrestling stable

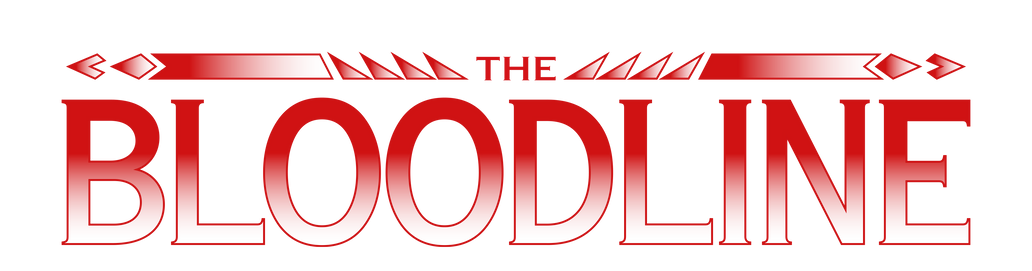
- The stable's logo

Stable
- Name(s): The Bloodline; MFT; The MFTs
- Leader: Roman Reigns
- Members: Jey Uso; Jimmy Uso; Solo Sikoa; Jacob Fatu
- Former members: See below
- Debut: July 9, 2021
- Years active: 2021–present

The Bloodline is a professional wrestling stable that performs in WWE on the Raw brand. The stable consists of leader Roman Reigns and his cousins The Usos (Jey Uso and Jimmy Uso), their younger brother Solo Sikoa and Jacob Fatu. The name of the stable is in reference to the members of the group also being members of the Anoaʻi family of Samoan professional wrestlers.

The stable officially formed in July 2021 after a feud between Reigns—managed by Paul Heyman—and The Usos. The three then formed The Bloodline with Heyman as their manager. From April 2022 until April 2024, Reigns was promoted as the Undisputed WWE Universal Champion, as he simultaneously held both the WWE and Universal championships in his fourth and second respective reigns, having the longest reign for the latter before losing the Undisputed title at WrestleMania XL. He took on the nicknames "Tribal Chief" and "Head of the Table" in reference to his role as the leader of the family. From May 2022 until April 2023, The Usos were promoted as the Undisputed WWE Tag Team Champions until they lost their titles at WrestleMania 39, as they simultaneously held both the Raw and SmackDown tag titles in their third and fifth respective reigns, having the longest reign and the longest male tag team title reign in WWE history for the latter. During this time, the stable included Sami Zayn as an honorary member, and also The Usos' younger brother Solo Sikoa.

After a falling out with Reigns, Zayn left in January 2023, followed by Jey in June. In February 2024 during the build up to WrestleMania XL, The Rock joined the group, but following the event in April, both Reigns and Rock took an indefinite hiatus, with Sikoa assuming the role of "Tribal Chief". Following this, Jimmy and Heyman were removed from the group by Sikoa, while Tama Tonga, Tonga Loa, and Jacob Fatu were added. On the November 8, 2024, episode of SmackDown, the original members of the Bloodline officially reunited when Sami Zayn made his return to assist the group in preparation for their upcoming Survivor Series: WarGames match against The Bloodline. After WarGames, The Bloodline name was slowly phased out and rebranded into The MFTs with the new additions of JC Mateo and the brother of Tama Tonga and Tonga Loa, Talla Tonga. The MFTs expelled Sikoa on June 26, 2026, episode of SmackDown, making the stable fully independent of The Bloodline.

In April 2026, Reigns reunited with The Usos following WrestleMania 42 and began rebuilding The Bloodline. After defeating Jacob Fatu in Tribal Combat at Clash in Italy, Reigns secured Fatu's allegiance, restoring the stable under his leadership.

== Background ==
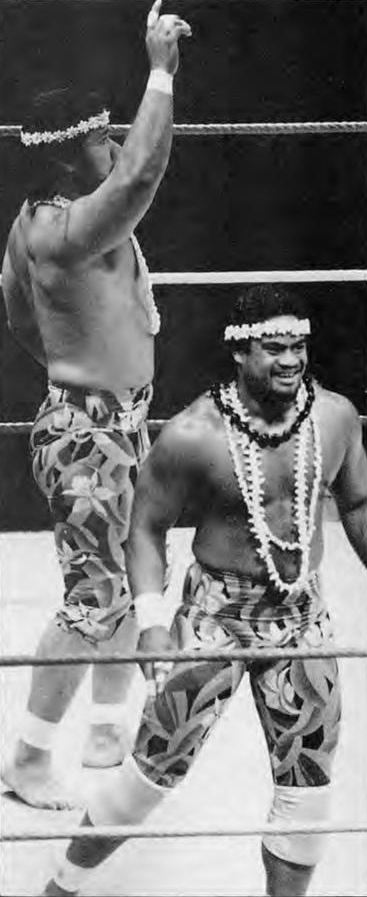
The Bloodline can trace its roots back to the late 1980s, when Jacob Fatu's father and Solo Sikoa's uncle Tama teamed with Haku, the father of Tama Tonga and Tonga Loa, as The Islanders

The Bloodline members have long histories in professional wrestling before the advent of the stable. The original members, Joe Anoa'i, better known as Roman Reigns, was born in Pensacola, Florida as the son of Sika Anoa'i of The Wild Samoans and twin brothers Jonathan Fatu and Joshua Fatu, also known as Jimmy and Jey Uso respectively as part of The Usos and sons of Solofa Fatu (better known as Rikishi), were born in San Francisco; as the trio attended Escambia High School in Pensacola where they played gridiron football together and graduated in 2003. Paul Heyman's managership and relationship with the Anoaʻi family dates back to 1988 when he, under his Paul E. Dangerously name, managed the Samoan SWAT Team, which composed of Rikishi (then known as Fatu), Rosey (then known as Big Matty Smalls), Samu, and Sam Fatu (also known as The Samoan Savage). Many years later, Heyman also introduced Reigns, alongside Seth Rollins and Dean Ambrose, as The Shield. Reigns made his professional wrestling debut in 2010 at WWE's former developmental territory, Florida Championship Wrestling (FCW), under the ring name Leakee. After FCW was shut down and rebranded as NXT in 2012, he took on the name "Roman Reigns" and had a short stint on NXT before being called up to the main roster in late 2012 where he became part of The Shield; he would later win multiple world championships after the stable's dissolution in 2014.

Meanwhile, The Usos and Solo Sikoa are the sons of Rikishi. The Usos made their pro-wrestling debut in 2009 in FCW where they were one-time FCW Tag Team Champions before moving to WWE's main roster in 2010 where they were managed by Tamina Snuka, who was the original manager of The Usos, and would go on to win multiple tag team championships. Tamina is the daughter of Jimmy Snuka, who is the uncle-in-law to Peter Maivia via marriage. The Usos' relationship with Sami Zayn began when they had their first match together facing against The Ascension (Konnor and Viktor) and Corey Graves on the April 24, 2014, episode of NXT in a six-man tag team match with the trio emerging victorious. Sikoa made his pro-wrestling debut in 2018 before signing with WWE in 2021 where he made his NXT debut that October until his main roster call up in September 2022. The Rock, like Reigns, had a successful professional football career; he later debuted in 1996 and became a member of the Nation of Domination the next year before becoming a multiple time world champion during the Attitude Era. His first interaction with Reigns on WWE television took place on the January 21, 2013, episode of Raw. Before that, a possible future match between the two men was referenced in the second season, fifth episode of Young Rock.

The Tongans (Tama Tonga and Tanga Loa) are the sons of Haku, who are unofficially a part of the Anoaʻi family, as the Rock considers Haku his uncle. Previous to their WWE debuts, they teamed together in New Japan Pro-Wrestling, and were multiple time IWGP Tag Team Champions, with Tonga founding the Bullet Club stable. Loa also had a brief stint in WWE previously as Camacho, usually tagging with Sin Cara, who was wrestling under the name Hunico. Jacob Fatu, who had performed on the independent circuit from 2012 to 2019 and then in Major League Wrestling (MLW) from 2019 to 2024 where he was the longest-reigning MLW World Heavyweight Champion, is the son of Sam Fatu and the nephew of Rikishi, making him a cousin to The Usos and Sikoa. Both Haku and Sam Fatu (also competed as Tama) previously wrestled together as The Islanders in the late 1980s. Sikoa and Fatu would team with his cousin Journey Fatu in the independent circuit in 2018. However, The Usos and Tonga Loa, then performing under the name of Donny Marlow, were part of the stable named The Polynesian Power Pack in FCW that competed in early 2010 with G-Rilla and Snuka.

== History ==
=== The Usos' feud with The Shield (2013–2014) ===
Before The Usos began teaming up with Reigns, they had several matches against The Shield, Reigns' old stable, with Seth Rollins and Dean Ambrose, with the majority taking place in 2013. On the May 6 episode of Raw, The Usos and Kofi Kingston teamed up against The Shield, who won the match after Ambrose pinned Kingston. On the May 17 episode of SmackDown, Reigns and Rollins defeated The Usos after Reigns pinned Jey. After the match, The Shield continued to beat down Jey until Kingston ran to make the save by hitting them with a steel chair. The Usos gained their first win on the June 28 episode of SmackDown after their teammate, Christian, pinned Ambrose in another six-man tag team match. On the July 1 episode of Raw, however, they lost a rematch, this time with Ambrose pinning Christian. On the July 12 episode of SmackDown, Rollins defeated Jey in a singles match.

At Money in the Bank on July 14, Reigns and Rollins defeated The Usos to retain the WWE Tag Team Championship after Reigns pinned Jimmy. On the July 19 episode of SmackDown, the two stables brawled until Mark Henry came to The Usos' aid. In return, The Usos helped Henry fend off The Shield on the July 22 episode of Raw. The following week, they lost after Ambrose pinned Jimmy. Despite this, Henry attacked The Shield after the match, forcing them to retreat. The same match result occurred on the August 7 episode of WWE Main Event. Throughout the remainder of the year, the two stables would exchange wins, with The Usos teaming with the likes of Kofi Kingston, Dolph Ziggler, Daniel Bryan, Big E Langston, Cody Rhodes and Goldust, Rey Mysterio and CM Punk. The last match that the two stables would have against each other was on the January 3, 2014, episode of SmackDown, where The Usos and Punk won after the latter pinned Ambrose.

=== Occasional team-ups (2015–2020) ===
Following his split from The Shield and his subsequent singles career, Reigns would occasionally join forces with The Usos in numerous tag-team matches, with The Usos also occasionally becoming involved in Reigns' feuds in support of their cousin. The trio first teamed together on the November 2, 2015 episode of Raw, where they teamed with Ryback and Dean Ambrose in a 5-on-5 Survivor Series elimination match against Seth Rollins, Kevin Owens, and The New Day (Kofi Kingston, Big E, and Xavier Woods), in which Reigns' team was victorious. Reigns and the Usos continued to team that year until Tribute to the Troops, where the trio teamed with Ambrose, Ryback, Kane, and The Dudley Boyz to defeat The League of Nations and The Wyatt Family.

On the May 2, 2016 episode of Raw, The Usos became involved in Reigns' feud with AJ Styles, as the duo had been feuding with Styles' allies, Luke Gallows and Karl Anderson at the time, with The Usos and Reigns facing Styles, Gallows and Anderson in a six-man tag team match. After Styles, Anderson and Gallows won the match, Anderson and Gallows wanted Styles to hit Reigns with a chair but Styles refused. When The Usos attacked Styles from behind with a chair, Styles retaliated with the chair. Ultimately, Reigns powerbombed Styles through the broadcast table. At Extreme Rules, The Usos were defeated by Gallows and Anderson in a Tornado tag team match. Later that same night, after Gallows and Anderson interfered in the WWE World Heavyweight Championship match between Reigns and Styles, The Usos interfered to assist Reigns, ultimately allowing Reigns to retain the title.

On the May 14, 2019 episode of SmackDown Live, The Usos aided Reigns from an attack by Elias, Shane McMahon, Daniel Bryan, and Rowan, and then lost to them in a handicap match. On the June 3 episode of Raw, The Usos saved Reigns from an attack by Drew McIntyre and The Revival (Dash Wilder and Scott Dawson), but lost to them in a six-man tag team match. On the January 3, 2020 episode of SmackDown, The Usos returned with a new short hair look, aiding Reigns from an attack by King Corbin and Dolph Ziggler. On the January 31 episode of SmackDown, Reigns and The Usos defeated King Corbin, Dolph Ziggler, and Robert Roode in a six-man tag team match to end their feud. Jimmy suffered a legitimate knee injury during the match at WrestleMania 36, putting him out of in-ring action indefinitely.

=== Roman Reigns' leadership (2020–2024) ===
==== Official formation of The Bloodline (2020–2021) ====
Original logo of The Bloodline

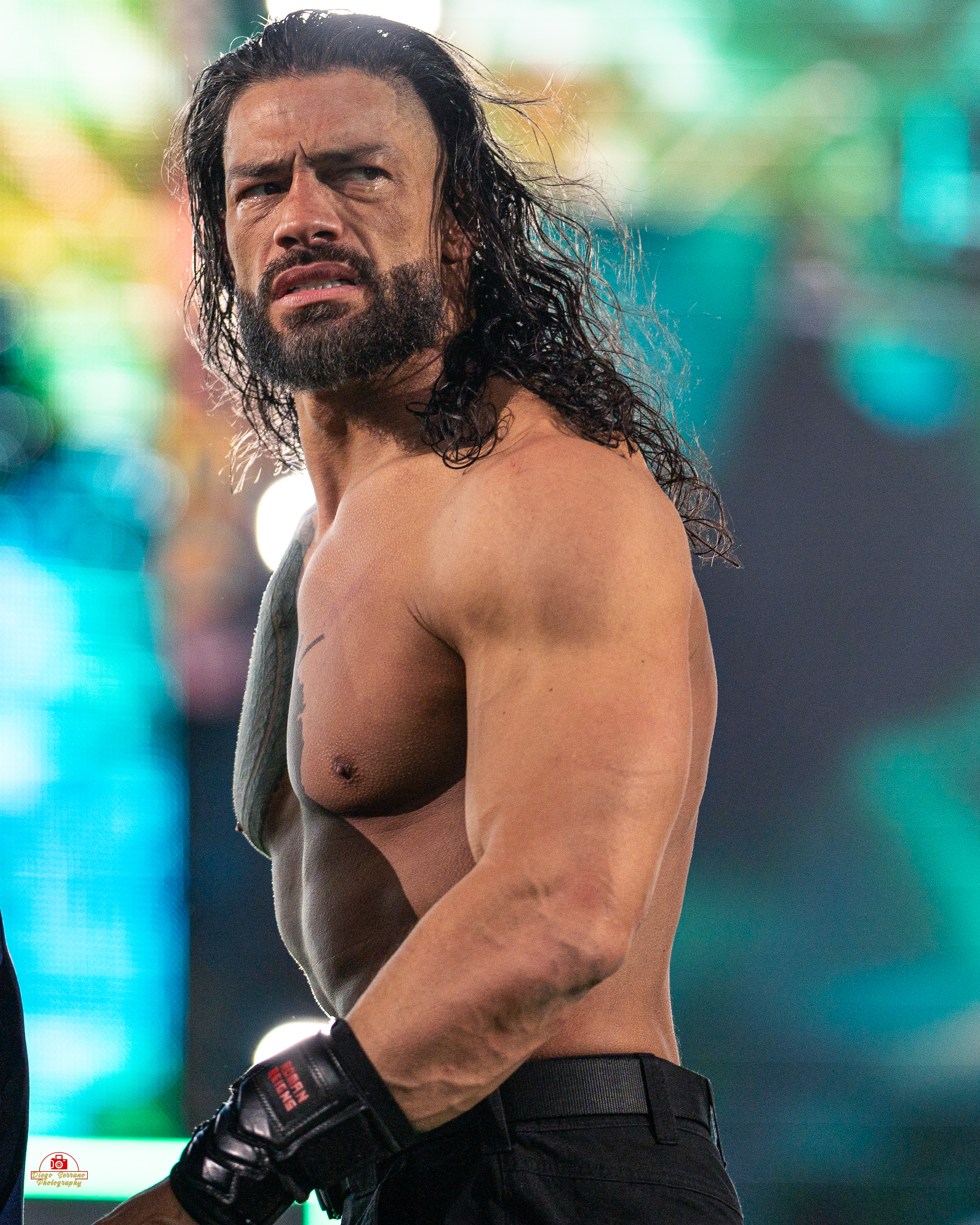
Roman Reigns, founding member and original leader of the stable

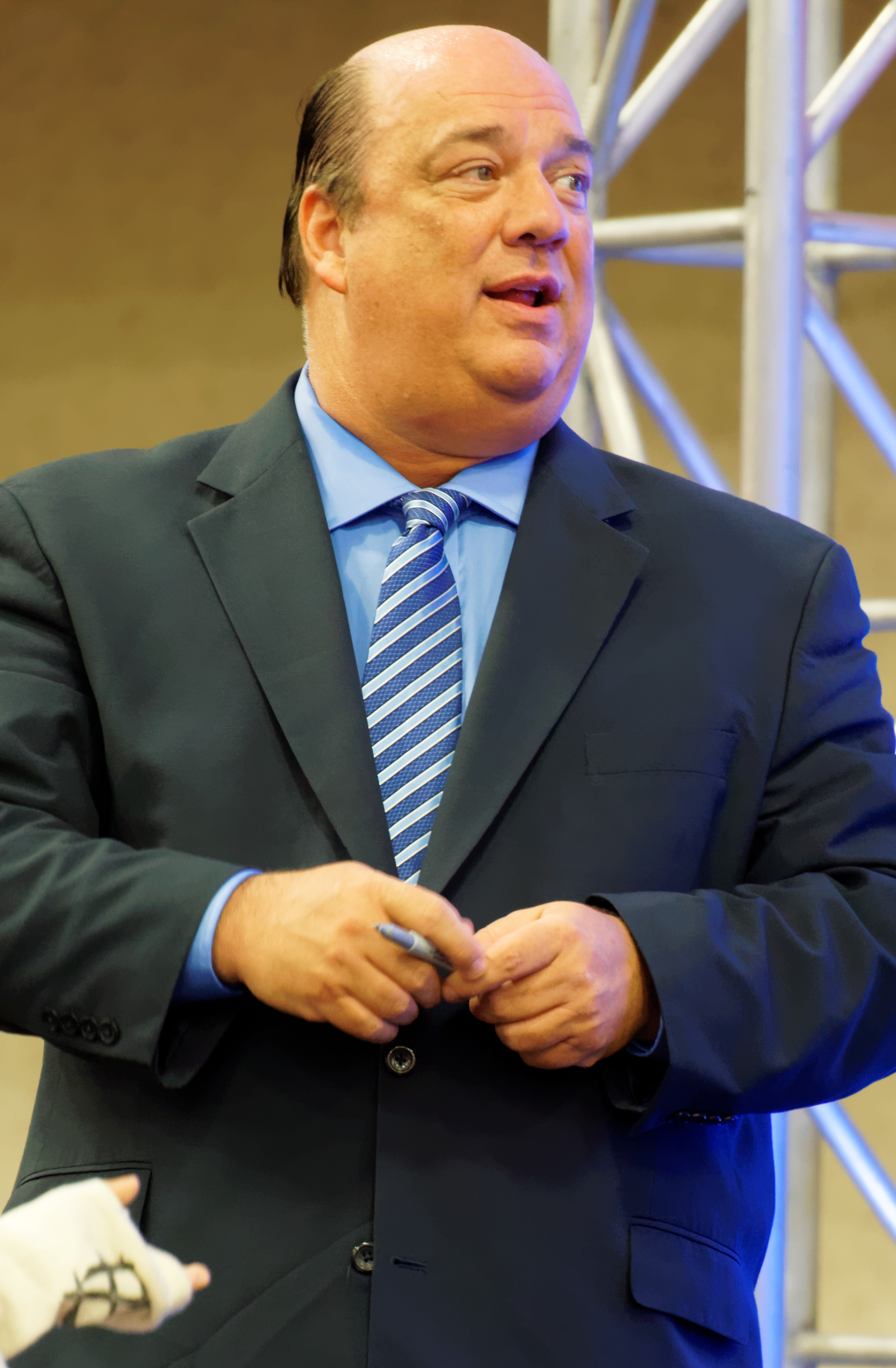
Paul Heyman, founding member and manager of the stable

At SummerSlam on August 23, 2020, Reigns returned after a five-month hiatus and attacked both newly crowned Universal Champion "The Fiend" Bray Wyatt and Braun Strowman, turning heel for the first time since 2014. With Paul Heyman as his manager, he won the WWE Universal Championship at Payback. Reigns defended the title against his cousin Jey Uso, first at Clash of Champions and later, at Hell in a Cell in a Hell in a Cell "I Quit" match with the added stipulation that if Jey lost, he would have to follow Reigns' orders or be kicked out of their family.

Jey joined Reigns in October 2020 while Jimmy joined in July 2021, starting the Bloodline stable. As part of the Bloodline, On the April 9 special WrestleMania episode of SmackDown, Jey won the André the Giant Memorial Battle Royal, Jey's first singles accolade in WWE.

==== All champions (2021–2022) ====
On the July 16 episode of SmackDown - the first episode after WWE resumed touring following its Florida "ThunderDome" residency during the COVID-19 pandemic - The Bloodline faced Edge and The Mysterios in a six-man tag team match, in which they emerged victorious, although Edge attacked the trio after the match. At Money in the Bank, The Usos defeated The Mysterios on the Kickoff pre-show to become five-time SmackDown Tag Team Champions. In the main event, Reigns defeated Edge to retain the Universal Championship. At SummerSlam, The Usos once again defeated The Mysterios to retain the SmackDown Tag Team Championships, and Reigns later defeated John Cena in the main event to retain the Universal Championship. At Extreme Rules, The Usos successfully defended their titles against The Street Profits (Montez Ford and Angelo Dawkins), and Reigns later defeated "The Demon" Finn Bálor in the main event to retain the Universal Championship. At Crown Jewel, The Usos defeated The Hurt Business (Cedric Alexander and Shelton Benjamin) on the Kickoff pre-show, while Reigns successfully defended his title against Brock Lesnar in the main event. At Survivor Series, The Usos lost to Raw Tag Team Champions RK-Bro (Randy Orton and Riddle), while Reigns defeated WWE Champion Big E in the main event. On December 17 episode of SmackDown, Reigns fired and attacked Heyman. Brock Lesnar then attacked The Bloodline and saved Heyman. On January 1, 2022, Reigns was pulled from his scheduled Day 1 match due to testing positive for COVID-19, while Brock Lesnar was instead added to Raw's WWE Championship match. The Usos still competed at Day 1, and retained their titles against The New Day (Kofi Kingston and Xavier Woods).

At WrestleMania 38, The Usos successfully defended their SmackDown Tag Team Championships against Shinsuke Nakamura and Rick Boogs, while Reigns was able to capture the WWE Championship from Brock Lesnar, effectively unifying the WWE Championship with the Universal Championship, becoming the Undisputed WWE Universal Champion. The Usos also defeated RK-Bro on the May 20 episode of SmackDown, becoming the Undisputed WWE Tag Team Champions and thus making all members of the faction double champions.

==== Induction of Sami Zayn and Solo Sikoa (2022–2023) ====
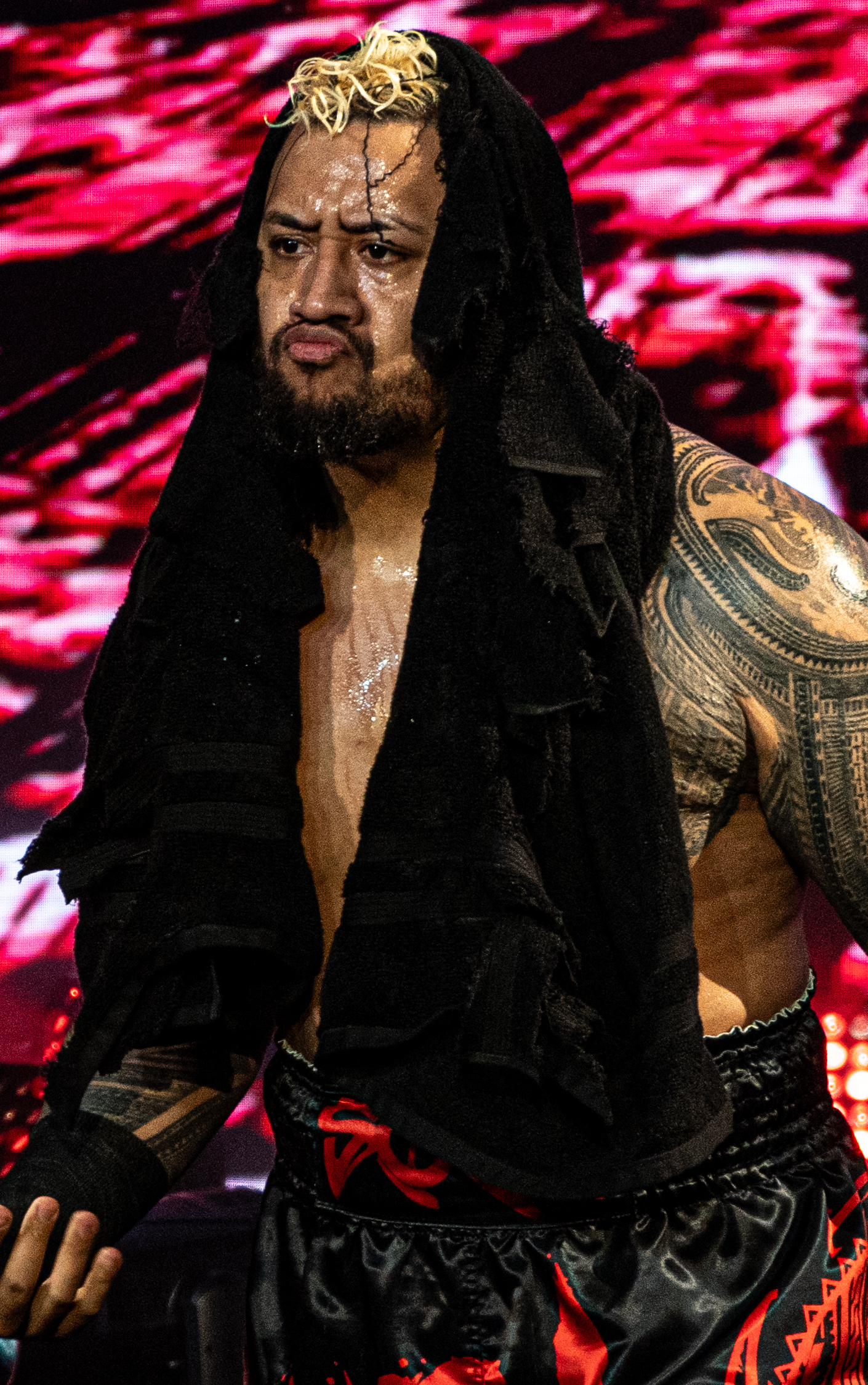
Solo Sikoa, enforcer of the stable

Around this time, Sami Zayn, who had also been in a rivalry with McIntyre, started associating himself with The Bloodline, and later became an honorary member of the group. At first, Zayn found it tricky to ingratiate himself into the group, which until this point had consisted only of members of the same family with the exception of Heyman; however, owing to his puppyish enthusiasm and apparent devotion to The Tribal Chief, Zayn gradually began to become accepted by the group, especially Jimmy, with whom Zayn had formed a bond. Zayn began to style himself as "The Honorary Uce".

On the September 23, 2022, episode of SmackDown, Zayn was ordered by Reigns to remove his Bloodline t-shirt. Initially saddened, Zayn was then presented with a t-shirt that read "Honorary Uce", making his position as member of the Bloodline official. At SummerSlam on July 30, The Usos defeated The Street Profits to retain the Undisputed WWE Tag Team Championship, while Reigns successfully defended the Undisputed WWE Universal Championship against Brock Lesnar in a Last Man Standing match.

At Clash at the Castle on September 3, Reigns defeated Drew McIntyre to retain the Undisputed WWE Universal Championship following interference from Solo Sikoa, Reigns' younger cousin and Usos' younger brother, who became the newest member of The Bloodline. On the September 13 episode of NXT, Sikoa defeated Carmelo Hayes to win the NXT North American Championship, giving The Bloodline a total of five championships and making them the first stable to hold titles across all three brands. However, the following week, Sikoa had to vacate the NXT North American Championship due to not being an eligible option in the fan vote that was to have originally determined Hayes' opponent.

At Crown Jewel on November 5, The Usos retained their titles against The Brawling Brutes while Reigns retained his titles against Logan Paul. Three weeks later at Survivor Series: WarGames on November 26, The Bloodline defeated The Brawling Brutes, Drew McIntyre, and Kevin Owens in a WarGames match, with Zayn solidifying his place in the group in the eyes of Jey. After losing to Owens and the returning John Cena on the final SmackDown of 2022, The Bloodline began a feud with Owens, who would later challenge Reigns for the Undisputed WWE Universal Championship at the Royal Rumble. Meanwhile, The Usos, Sikoa, and Zayn had been wreaking havoc on Raw over several weeks, which led to Adam Pearce ordering The Usos to defend the Raw Tag Team Championship against The Judgment Day, who had won the championship opportunity in a tag team turmoil match on the January 9, 2023 episode of Raw.

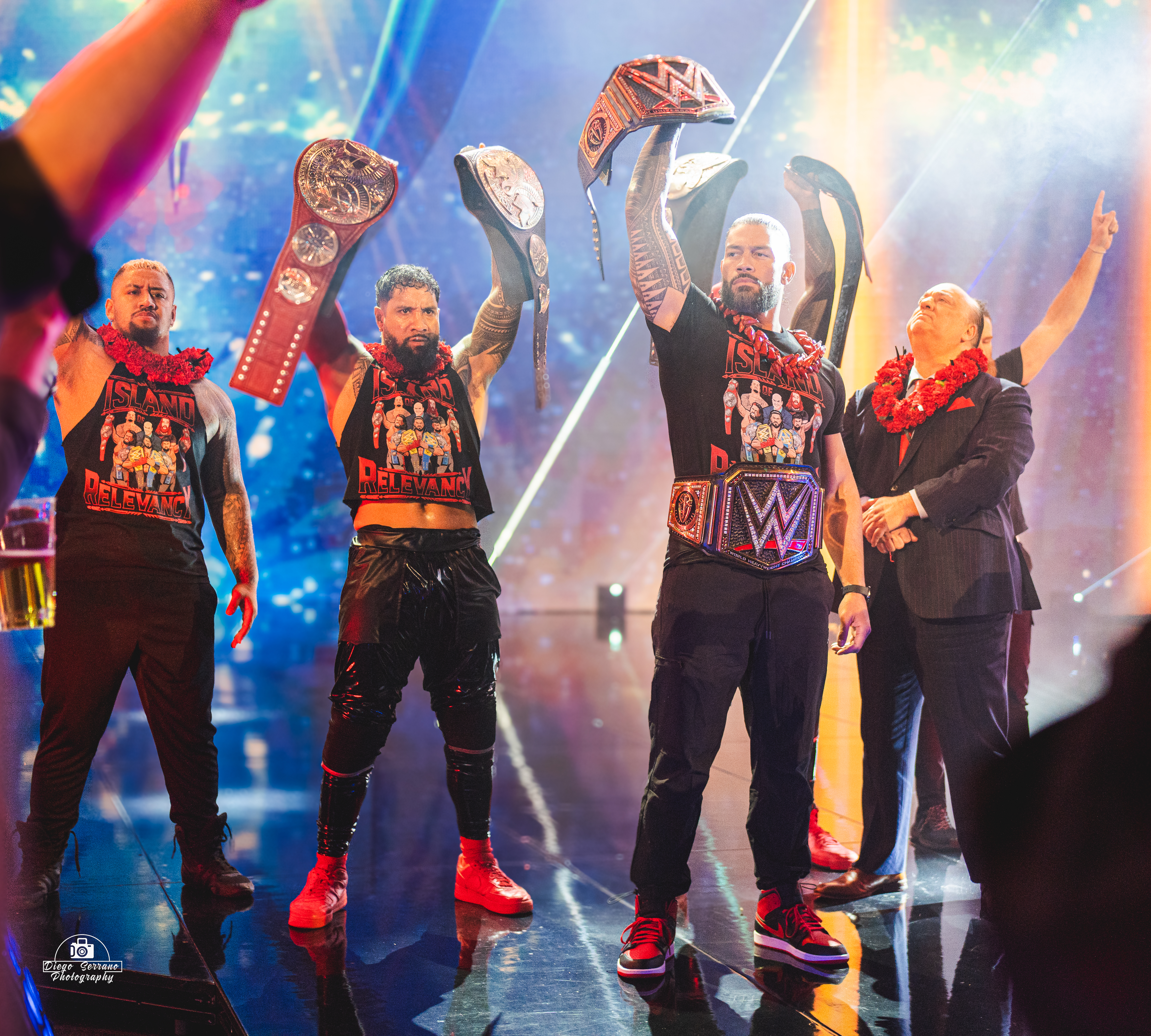
The Bloodline at Raw is XXX in January 2023

At Raw is XXX on January 23, 2023, Sami Zayn was put on trial by Reigns in "Tribal Court", in which Reigns accused Zayn of plotting against The Bloodline and being secretly in league with his longtime "frenemy" Kevin Owens. Paul Heyman acted as prosecutor, showing several videos of perceived treachery towards The Bloodline. Zayn then shot back saying that, because of what he was perceived as, he did not have a defense. Outraged by this statement, Reigns called for Sikoa to attack him, but Jey immediately rushed to protect Zayn, offering a passionate defense of The Honorary Uce, leading to Zayn being declared innocent by Reigns, albeit grudgingly. The segment was originally planned to be Reigns' "Acknowledgment Ceremony" featuring several members of the Anoa'i family appearing but many of them did not appear such as Rikishi, who was ill, and The Wild Samoans were met with travel problems. In addition, WWE was given a cease and desist order by Major League Wrestling in an attempt to use their talent such as Jacob Fatu (who was not signed with WWE at the time) and Lance Anoa'i amidst an ongoing legal battle.

Later that night, The Usos defended their Raw Tag Team Championship against The Judgment Day (represented by Damian Priest and Dominik Mysterio), but after Jimmy suffered a mid-match injury, Zayn took his place alongside Jey and the two were victorious.

==== Bloodline Civil War and addition of The Rock (2023–2024) ====
At the 2023 Royal Rumble event, Reigns retained the Undisputed WWE Universal Championship against Kevin Owens. Following the match, there was an in-ring segment where The Bloodline attacked Owens, handcuffing him to the ropes and beating him. Reigns ordered Zayn to hit Owens, but Zayn instead hit Reigns with the chair, turning face for the first time since 2017. The group then beat down Zayn. Meanwhile, Jey watched in disgust and left the scene. Jimmy appeared at Elimination Chamber and tried to assist Reigns in his title defense against Zayn, while Jey entered the ring and prevented Reigns from attacking Zayn with a steel chair, after the referee had been knocked unconscious. Shortly after, Zayn got up and attempted to spear Reigns, but inadvertently speared Jey. Reigns ended up retaining his title.

On the March 6 episode of Raw, Jey showed up from the crowd during Jimmy's match against Zayn which Jimmy lost. Following the match, Jey appeared to hug Zayn before superkicking him, signaling Jey's allegiance to The Bloodline. The Usos and Sikoa assaulted Zayn before Cody Rhodes immediately rushed out to save him. On Night 1 of WrestleMania 39, The Usos lost the Undisputed WWE Tag Team Championships to Owens and Zayn. On Night 2 of WrestleMania 39, Reigns retained the Undisputed WWE Universal Championship against Rhodes after interference from Sikoa.

On the April 17 episode of Raw, Heyman announced that Reigns had entered The Bloodline into a temporary alliance with The Judgment Day. Following Heyman's announcement, Sikoa beat the Latino World Order's Rey Mysterio in a singles match. Later that night, The Judgment Day and The Bloodline got into a brawl with Matt Riddle, Owens, Zayn, and the Latino World Order. On the first night of the 2023 WWE Draft on the April 28 episode of SmackDown, Reigns and Sikoa (with Heyman) were drafted to SmackDown as the number one pick. Later that night, The Usos failed to capture the Undisputed WWE Tag Team Championship in their rematch against Owens and Zayn. At Backlash, The Usos and Sikoa defeated Riddle, Owens, and Zayn in a six-man tag team match. However, tensions within the group further flared during the match and it escalated when Sikoa almost hit Jey with the Samoan Spike.

On the May 26 episode of SmackDown, Owens and Zayn hosted the KO Show with Reigns and Sikoa as guests, but The Usos made an appearance against Reigns' wishes. As Jimmy proclaimed himself the "Tribal Chief" after being insulted as Reigns' errand boys, Reigns entered the arena and confronted Jimmy before confronting Owens and Zayn. After The Bloodline beat the two up, Jimmy refused to hand the titles to Reigns before they were taken by Jey, further sowing dissension in The Bloodline. At the Night of Champions event in Saudi Arabia on May 27, The Usos interfered in the Undisputed WWE Tag Team Championship match between Reigns and Sikoa against Owens and Zayn. During the match, after accidentally attacking Sikoa while aiming for Zayn, Jimmy betrayed Reigns after the latter disrespected both him and Jey. Despite Jey's reluctance, The Usos abandoned Reigns and walked away, resulting in Owens and Zayn retaining the titles.

On the following episode of SmackDown during the celebration of Reigns surpassing 1,000 days as Universal Champion, Sikoa turned on The Usos by attacking Jimmy and sided with Reigns, who officially exiled Jimmy from the group. The following week, Heyman demanded Jey reaffirm his loyalty to Reigns and arranged a WWE United States Championship match against Austin Theory to entice him, but Jimmy inadvertently ended up costing him the match. On the June 16 episode of SmackDown, Jey decided to side with Jimmy and exited The Bloodline by superkicking Reigns and helping Jimmy fend off Sikoa, ending The Usos' association with Reigns in the process. This led to a match dubbed the "Bloodline Civil War" being announced for Money in the Bank pitting Reigns and Sikoa vs. The Usos. The Usos won the match with Jey giving Reigns his first direct pinfall loss since December 2019 at TLC: Tables, Ladders & Chairs.

At SummerSlam, Jimmy appeared to have turned on Jey by pulling him out of the ring while he was trying to pin Reigns and superkicked him, allowing Reigns to defeat Jey. However, on the August 11 episode of SmackDown, he explained that the reason for his actions was out of fear that if Jey had become the new Tribal Chief, the power would have corrupted him. Jey responded by superkicking Reigns, Sikoa, and finally Jimmy. Afterwards, he declared that he was quitting WWE. A few weeks later, Jimmy returned on the September 1 episode of SmackDown with a new theme song, while Jey moved to Raw the next night at Payback with the remixed version of his former entrance theme.

After The Usos split up, Jimmy Uso rejoined the stable. At Fastlane on October 7, Jimmy and Sikoa lost to John Cena and LA Knight, who replaced AJ Styles after a beatdown a month prior, in a tag team match. On the October 16 episode of Raw, Jimmy attacked Jey, helping The Judgment Day (Finn Bálor and Damian Priest) win the Undisputed WWE Tag Team Championship from Jey and Cody Rhodes. At Crown Jewel in November 2023, Reigns defeated LA Knight to retain the Undisputed WWE Universal Championship after interference from The Bloodline, while Sikoa defeated Cena with 9 Samoan Spikes. On the following episode of SmackDown, Knight stated that he was not done with The Bloodline until he defeated Reigns for the title. Orton then returned at Survivor Series: WarGames later that same month, and on the December 1 episode of SmackDown, he signed with the SmackDown brand after fending off an attack by The Bloodline, vowing to get revenge.

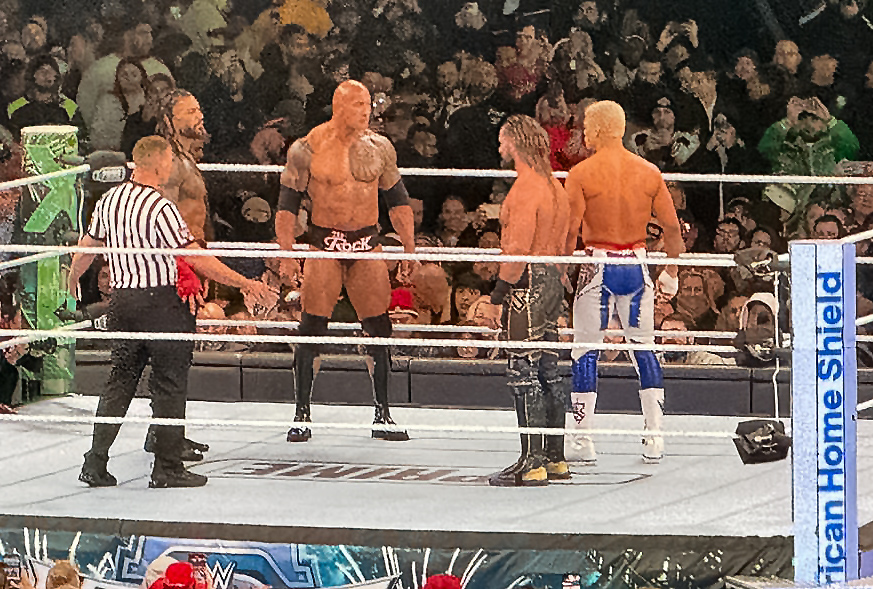
The Rock and Roman Reigns face to face with Cody Rhodes and Seth "Freakin" Rollins at WrestleMania XL.

On the December 15 episode of SmackDown, Reigns named Sikoa as the "Tribal Heir" of The Bloodline while Styles returned and helped Knight and Orton fend off The Bloodline before attacking Knight. The following week, Styles explained that he attacked Knight for taking his spot in a tag team match at Fastlane. After Orton interrupted and said that he also wanted a title match against Reigns, SmackDown General Manager Nick Aldis announced that Orton, Styles, and Knight would compete in a triple threat match at SmackDown: New Year's Revolution, where the winner would face Reigns for the Undisputed WWE Universal Championship at the Royal Rumble. During the match, The Bloodline interfered, forcing the match to be declared a no contest. Afterwards, Nick Aldis decided that AJ Styles, LA Knight, and Randy Orton would all challenge for Reigns' championship in a fatal four-way match at the Royal Rumble. At the namesake event, Reigns retained the title.

After Cody Rhodes won the 2024 Royal Rumble, a WrestleMania XL Kickoff media event was then held on February 8 that included The Rock. Rhodes challenged Reigns for the title at WrestleMania XL. Two weeks later, The Rock officially joined The Bloodline, thus turning heel for the first time since 2003. At WrestleMania XL Night 1, Reigns and The Rock won a tag team match against Cody Rhodes and Seth "Freakin" Rollins, with the stipulation that if Rhodes and Rollins won, The Bloodline would be barred from ringside for Rhodes and Reigns' match; however, if Reigns and The Rock won, the match would take place under Bloodline Rules. On WrestleMania XL Night 2, Reigns lost the titles to Rhodes, ending his 1,316-day reign as champion.

=== Solo Sikoa's leadership (2024–2026) ===
==== Bloodline Civil War II (2024–2025) ====
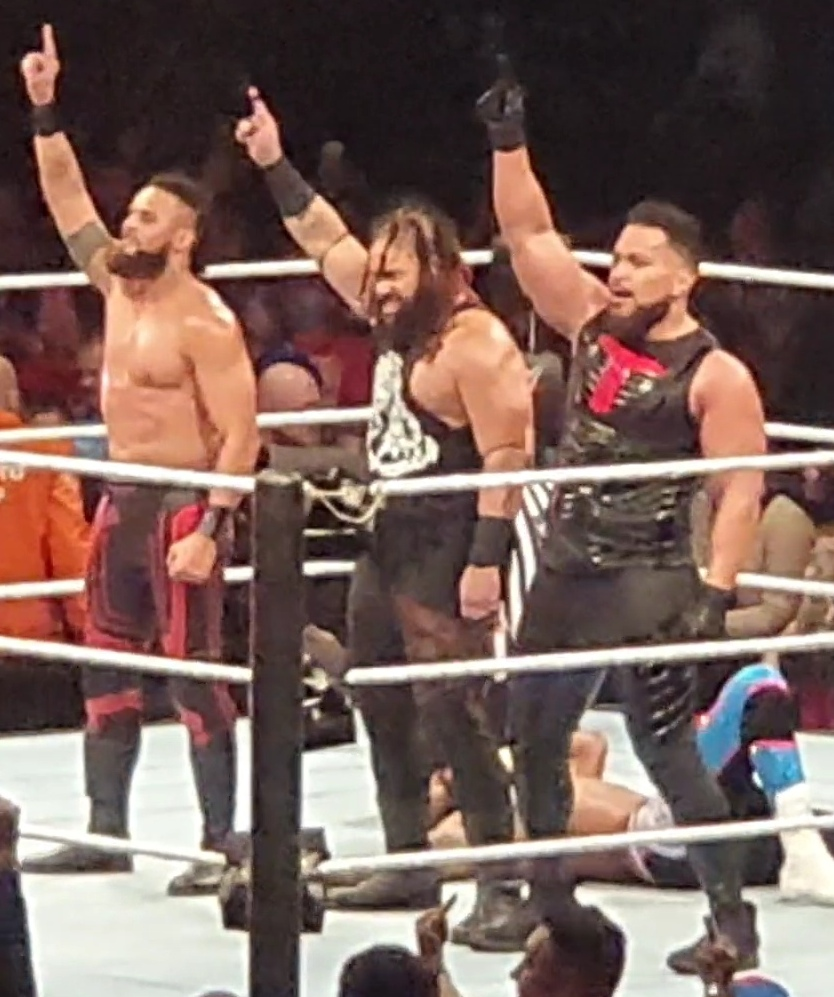
Tama Tonga, Jacob Fatu, and Tonga Loa at a house show in November 2024.

After losing the title, Reigns and Rock took time off from television (Note: The Rock went on a hiatus due to the filming of the biopic The Smashing Machine) and Sikoa, the group's enforcer under Reigns, was appointed as the de facto leader of the stable. The formation changed when Jimmy was kicked out of the group and Tama Tonga and Tonga Loa (now referred to as The Tongans) were introduced into the stable. (Note: Tama made his WWE debut on SmackDown on April 12, while Loa made his return at Backlash France. Loa previously had a stint with WWE from 2009 to 2014 under the ring name Camacho.) The group then renewed their rivalry with Kevin Owens and Randy Orton, in which The Bloodline emerged victorious in a tag team street fight at Backlash France.

The night before Clash at the Castle: Scotland, Solo Sikoa officially anointed Tama Tonga and Tonga Loa into the group, giving the nicknames "The Right Hand Man" (formerly used by Jey Uso) and "The Infamous", respectively. At the event the next day, The Bloodline attacked Rhodes following his title defense against AJ Styles, rekindling their feud in the process. On the following episode of SmackDown on June 21, Jacob Fatu, who had signed with WWE in April 2024, made his debut, joining the stable when he attacked Kevin Owens, Randy Orton, and Rhodes. Over the following weeks, both Heyman and Reigns were removed from the group and Sikoa was appointed as the leader of the stable assuming the title of Tribal Chief. At Money in the Bank, The Bloodline emerged victorious in a six-man tag team match over Rhodes, Orton, and Owens with Sikoa pinning Rhodes.

In the main event of the August 2 episode of SmackDown, the night before SummerSlam, Fatu and Tama Tonga defeated DIY (Johnny Gargano and Tommaso Ciampa) to win the WWE Tag Team Championship. On the August 23 episode of SmackDown, Sikoa had Fatu relinquish his share of the title to Loa so that Fatu could be Sikoa's personal enforcer. During the September 10 episode of NXT, Fatu, Tonga, and Loa (in his first NXT appearance since 2014), took out The Street Profits and defending NXT Tag Team Champions Axiom and Nathan Frazer.

At SummerSlam, Sikoa lost to Rhodes in a Bloodline Rules match for the Undisputed WWE Championship following interference by the returning Roman Reigns. On September 13 episode of SmackDown, Sikoa again failed to win the title from Rhodes in a steel cage match, after which Reigns agreed to team with Rhodes to face Sikoa and Fatu in a tag team match at Bad Blood. In the main event of Bad Blood, Roman Reigns and Cody Rhodes defeated Sikoa and Fatu after the returning Jimmy prevented The Tongans from interfering. After the match, The Rock made a surprise return and confronted Reigns, Rhodes and Jimmy. On the October 20 episode of Raw, The Bloodline attacked Jey, costing him the Intercontinental Championship against Bron Breakker. On the October 25 episode of SmackDown, The Tongans lost the tag titles to The Motor City Machine Guns (Alex Shelley and Chris Sabin) after interference from Reigns, Jimmy and Jey, ending their reign at 84 days.

On the November 1 episode of Smackdown (taped after the conclusion of the October 25 episode), Reigns and The Usos reunited for the first time in over a year. At Crown Jewel on November 2, The Bloodline defeated Reigns and The Usos in a six-man tag team match with Sikoa pinning Reigns. On the November 8 episode of SmackDown, Sikoa challenged Reigns to a WarGames match between The Bloodline and the team of Reigns, The Usos and Sami Zayn. On the November 15 episode of SmackDown, The Bloodline recruited Bronson Reed to be their fifth member for WarGames against Reigns, The Usos, and Zayn. At Survivor Series: WarGames on November 30, The Bloodline and Bronson Reed lost to Reigns, The Usos, Sami Zayn and CM Punk in a WarGames match, with Sikoa being pinned by Reigns. On the Raw premiere on Netflix on January 6, 2025, Sikoa lost to Reigns in a Tribal Combat match, with Reigns taking back the Ula Fala from Sikoa, ending their feud.

==== Rebrand as MFT (2025–2026) ====
The logo of the stable when it was known as The MFTs

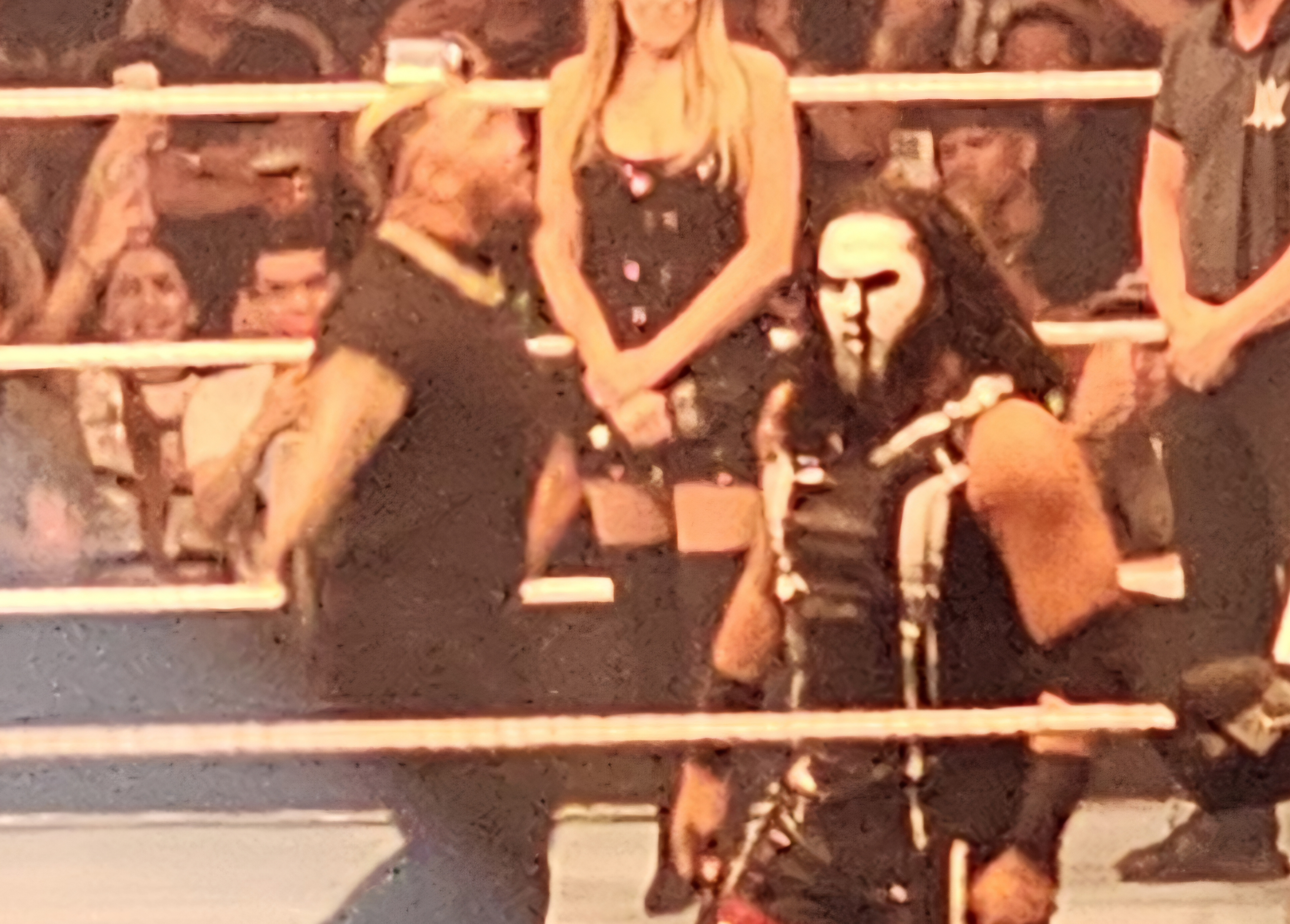
Solo Sikoa and Talla Tonga as the MFTs

On April 19 at WrestleMania 41 Night 1, Fatu defeated LA Knight to win the WWE United States Championship to earn his first singles title in WWE. On May 10 at Backlash, Fatu retained his title against Knight, Damian Priest, and Drew McIntyre in a fatal four-way match with assistance from a debuting JC Mateo. After Backlash, tension started to rise between Fatu and Sikoa. On June 7 at Money in the Bank, Fatu betrayed Sikoa after attacking him in the namesake ladder match, leaving The Bloodline and turning face in the process. On June 28 at Night of Champions, Sikoa defeated Fatu to win the United States Championship with assistance from Mateo, the returning Loa and the debuting Talla Tonga.

After Night of Champions, Sikoa, Mateo, Loa, and Talla began to be referred to as "MFT" (My Family Tree). On July 12 at Saturday Night's Main Event, Sikoa retained the U.S. Title against Jimmy Uso, aided by interference from his stablemates. On August 3 at SummerSlam, Sikoa successfully defended the U.S. Title in a Steel Cage match against Fatu, after interference from his MFT stablemates. On the August 29 episode of SmackDown, Sami Zayn defeated Sikoa to capture the U.S. Championship with Fatu and Uso playing roles in evening the odds against the MFT's. On the October 10 episode of SmackDown, Tama made his return attacking Zayn and Shinsuke Nakamura during the former's U.S. open challenge, adopting new war style face paint.

Sikoa and Tama won the WWE Tag Team Championship on January 23 episode of SmackDown by defeating Dexter Lumis and Joe Gacy of The Wyatt Sicks, but lost it 56 days later to Damian Priest and R-Truth. On May 2, Mateo and Loa were both released from WWE, leaving the stable. The stable disbanded when Tama and Talla left Sikoa on the June 26 episode, however the brothers continued to use the MFT name after subsequently forming an alliance with their father Haku.

=== Reformation under Reigns (2026–present) ===
Following WrestleMania 42, Reigns reunited with The Usos and began rebuilding The Bloodline. Jacob Fatu, however, feuded with Reigns over the World Heavyweight Championship. The rivalry culminated in a Tribal Combat match at Clash in Italy, where Reigns defeated Fatu to retain the title and Fatu was included into the reformed Bloodline. At Night 1 of SummerSlam on August 1, Fatu and The Usos lost to LA Knight, Royce Keys and Sikoa in a Six-Man Tag Team Match. While at Night 2 of SummerSlam on August 2, Reigns defeated Seth Rollins to retain his title. At Raw in Mexico City on September 14, Reigns successfully defended the title against Penta. At Money in the Bank on October 10, Reigns successfully defended the title against Knight. After the match, 946 (Keys, Bronco Nima, and Lucien Price) showed up, followed by Sikoa and The Usos. The teams brawled until Jaida Parker showed up in an SUV and took 946 away. On the October 12 episode of Raw, The Bloodline and 946 collided in a Six-Man Tag Team Match which ended in a no contest after Carmelo Hayes appeared and officially joined the group attacking Sikoa. On the following episode of Raw, Reigns, Sikoa and The Usos brawled with 946, with the latter retreating. After the show went off the air, Reigns and Sikoa reconciled and Sikoa rejoined The Bloodline. At Crown Jewel on November 7, Reigns defeated Undisputed WWE Champion and former Honorary Uce Sami Zayn in a Champion vs. Champion match to win the Crown Jewel Championship.

== Reception ==
Midway through 2022, the storyline between The Bloodline and Sami Zayn was highly praised, noticing the complexity, with Dave Scherer of PWInsider calling the storyline "some of the best wrestling ever, not just now. The whole story has been deep and nuanced". In 2026, Eric Bischoff named The Bloodline as the greatest story in pro wrestling history.

After The Bloodline reunited in 2026, there was some negative opinions. Eric Bischoff, who previously praised the stable, pointed WWE was repeating the same mistake he made with the nWo. Vince Russo said that the storyline was recycled over and over.

== Members ==
*	Founding member
I-II	Leader(s)
M	Manager

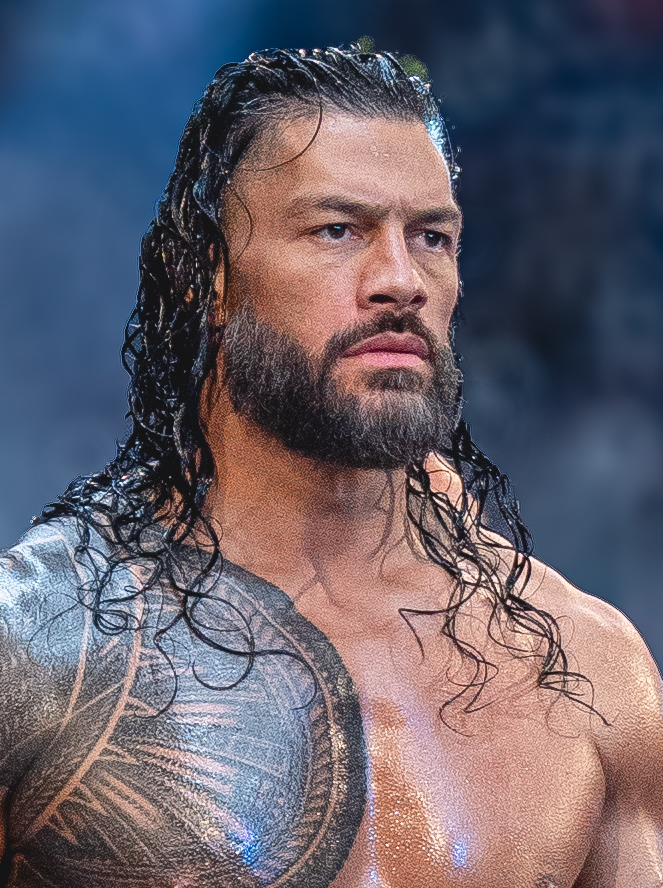
Roman Reigns (I)

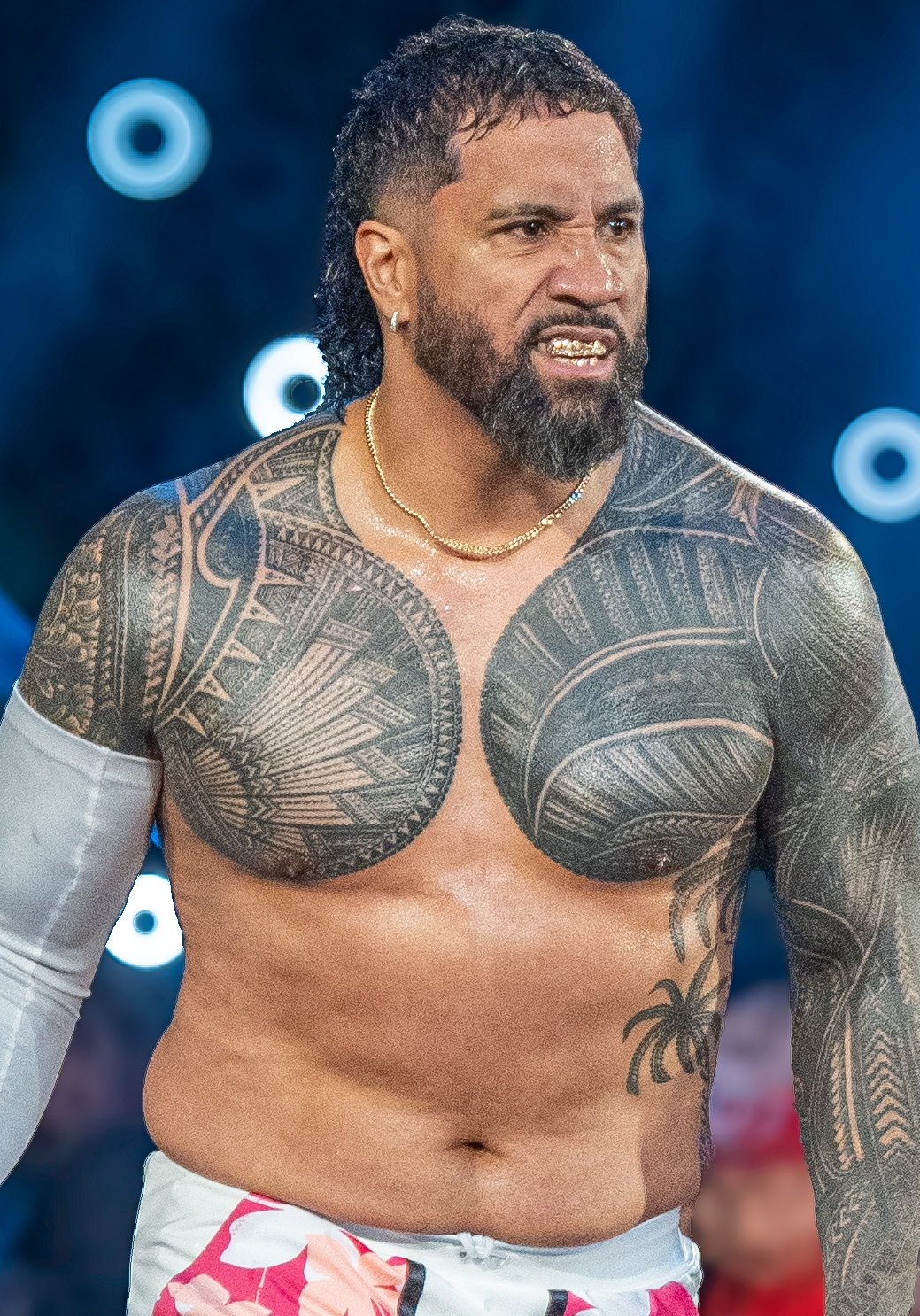
Jey Uso

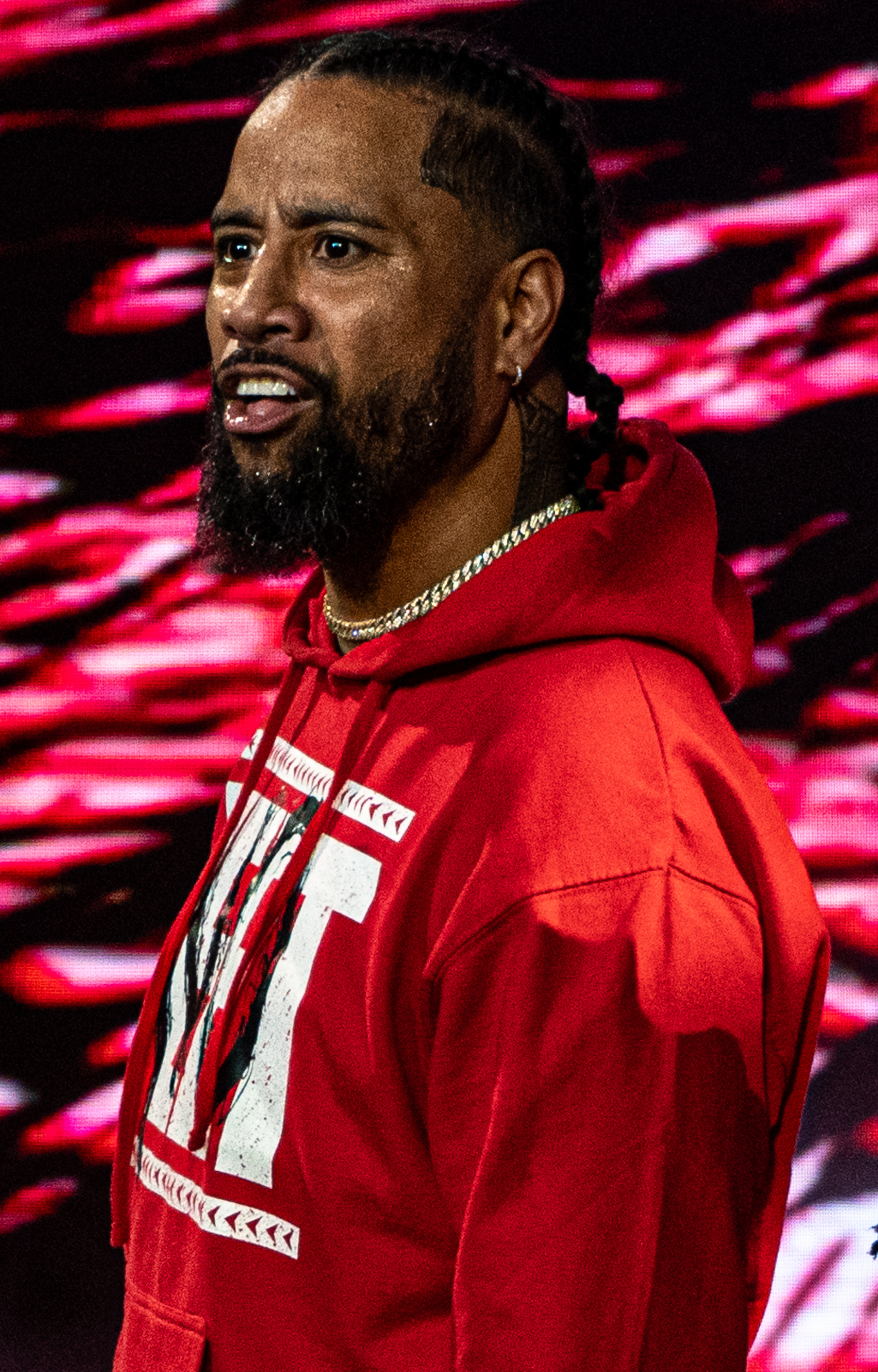
Jimmy Uso

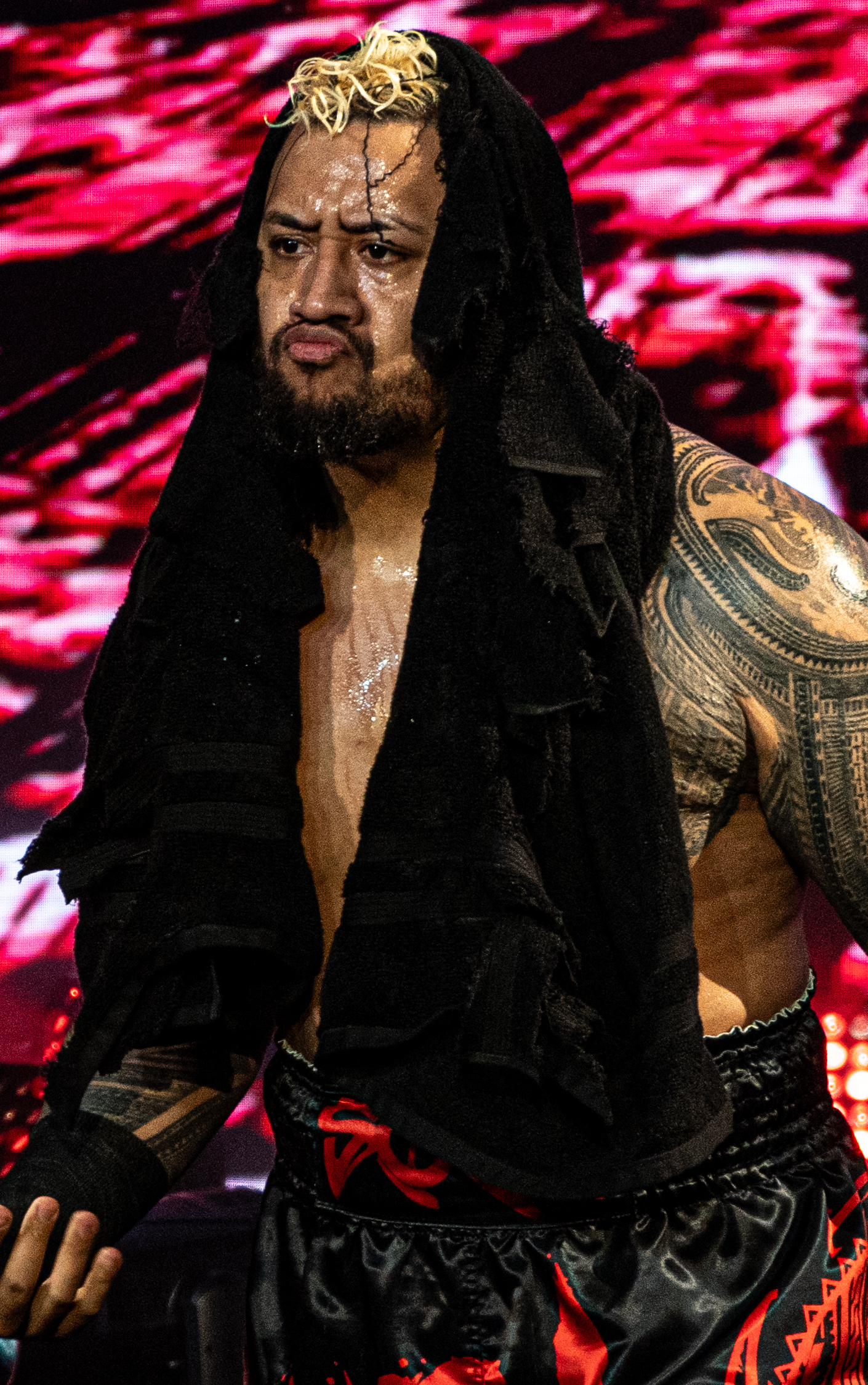
Solo Sikoa

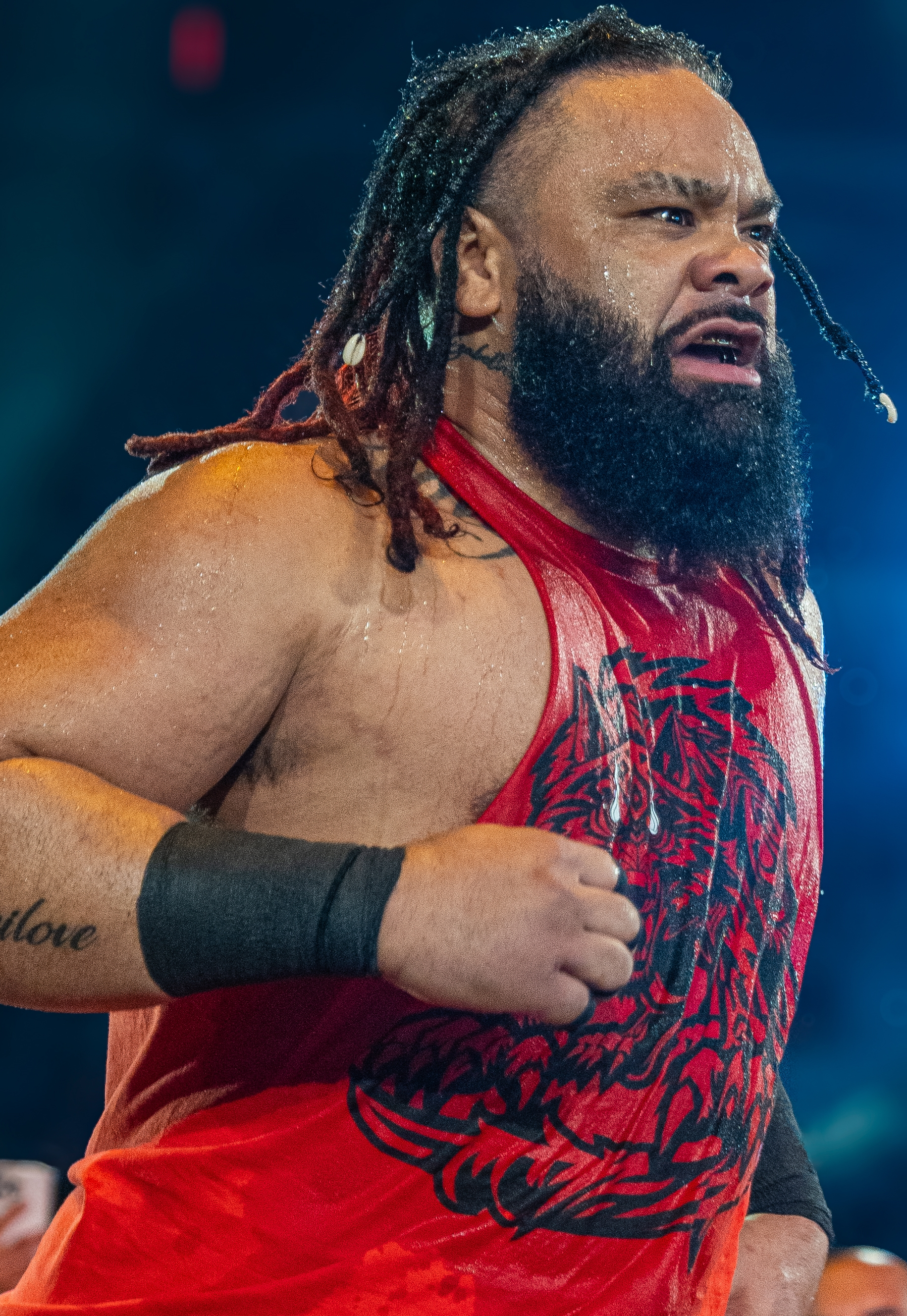
Jacob Fatu

Members		Joined
Roman Reigns (Note: Reigns was expelled from of The Bloodline on July 5, 2024 and returned on April 20, 2026.) (I)	*	July 9, 2021
Jey Uso (Note: Uso quit The Bloodline on June 16, 2023 and returned on April 20, 2026.)	*	July 9, 2021
Jimmy Uso (Note: Uso was expelled from The Bloodline on June 2, 2023 before returning on September 22, 2023. He was expelled again on April 12, 2024 before once again returning on April 20, 2026.)	*	July 9, 2021
Solo Sikoa (Note: Sikoa was expelled from The MFTs on June 23, 2026 and returned to The Bloodline on October 19, 2026.) (II) (Note: Sikoa became the leader of The Bloodline on July 5, 2024 after Reigns' expulsion. His leadership ended when he expelled from The MFTs.)		September 3, 2022
Jacob Fatu (Note: Fatu quit The Bloodline on June 7, 2025 and returned on June 1, 2026.)		June 21, 2024

=== Former ===
Members		Joined	Left
Sami Zayn (Note: During his association with The Bloodline, Zayn was considered an honorary member.)		May 27, 2022	January 28, 2023
The Rock		February 16, 2024	April 8, 2024
Paul Heyman (Note: Heyman temporarily left The Bloodline from December 17, 2021 to January 29, 2022.) (M)	*	July 9, 2021	June 28, 2024
Tonga Loa		May 4, 2024	May 2, 2026
JC Mateo		May 10, 2025	May 2, 2026
Tama Tonga		April 12, 2024	June 23, 2026
Talla Tonga		June 28, 2025	June 23, 2026

== Sub-groups ==
Affiliate	Members	Tenure	Type
The Usos	Jey Uso; Jimmy Uso	2021–2023, 2026–present	Tag team

=== Former ===
Affiliate	Members	Tenure	Type
The Tongans	Tama Tonga; Tonga Loa; Talla Tonga	2024–2026	Stable/Tag team

== Championships and accomplishments ==
- CBS Sports
  - Feud of the Year (2020) – Roman Reigns vs. Jey Uso
- ESPN
  - Best Storyline of the Year (2022) – The Bloodline and Sami Zayn
  - Best Storyline of the Year (2023) – The Bloodline 2.0
- New York Post
  - Storyline of the Year (2022) – The Bloodline and Sami Zayn
  - Storyline of the Year (2023)
- Pro Wrestling Illustrated
  - Faction of the Year (2022, 2024)
  - Singles wrestlers
    - Ranked Reigns No. 1 of the top 500 singles wrestlers in the PWI 500 in 2022
    - Ranked Jey Uso No. 45 of the top 500 singles wrestlers in the PWI 500 in 2021
    - Ranked Jimmy Uso No. 147 of the top 500 singles wrestlers in the PWI 500 in 2022
    - Ranked Sikoa No. 38 of the top 500 singles wrestlers in the PWI 500 in 2023
  - Tag teams
    - Ranked The Usos No. 1 of the top 50 Tag Teams in the PWI Tag Team 100 in 2022
- Sports Illustrated
  - Wrestler of the Year (2021) – Roman Reigns
- Wrestling Observer Newsletter
  - Best Box Office Draw (2022, 2023) – Roman Reigns
  - Best Gimmick – Roman Reigns (2021) and Sami Zayn (2022)
  - Best Non-Wrestler (2021, 2022) – Paul Heyman
  - Feud of the Year (2023) – against Kevin Owens and Sami Zayn
- WWE
  - WWE Championship (1 time) – Reigns
  - WWE Universal Championship (1 time) – Reigns
  - World Heavyweight Championship (1 time, current) – Reigns
  - WWE United States Championship (2 times) – Fatu (1), Sikoa (1)
  - World Tag Team Championship (Note: The Usos had held the titles when it was the WWE Raw Tag Team Championship.) (1 time) – The Usos
  - WWE Tag Team Championship (Note: The Usos had held the titles when it was the WWE SmackDown Tag Team Championship.) (3 times) – The Usos (1), Tama Tonga and Jacob Fatu/Tonga Loa (1), Solo Sikoa and Tama Tonga (1)
  - NXT North American Championship (1 time) – Sikoa
  - André the Giant Memorial Battle Royal (2021) – Jey Uso
  - WWE Hall of Fame (Class of 2024) – Heyman
  - WWE Crown Jewel Championship (2026) – Reigns

== Other media ==
- Biography: WWE Legends: Roman Reigns (season 4, episode 6) — Paul Heyman (Executive Producer, Director)

== See also ==
- Anoaʻi family
- List of family relations in professional wrestling
