= Backlash (2025) =

WWE premium live event

- Promotional poster featuring John Cena and St. Louis native Randy Orton
- Promotion: WWE
- Brand(s): Raw; SmackDown
- Date: May 10, 2025
- City: St. Louis, Missouri
- Venue: Enterprise Center
- Attendance: 17,155
- Tagline: "One Last Time"

WWE event chronology
← Previous; WrestleMania 41	Next → Saturday Night's Main Event XXXIX

Backlash chronology
← Previous; 2024	Next → 2026

The 2025 Backlash, also promoted as Backlash: St. Louis, was a professional wrestling premium live event (PLE) produced by WWE, held for wrestlers from the promotion's main roster brands, Raw and SmackDown. It was the 20th Backlash and took place on Saturday, May 10, 2025, at the Enterprise Center in St. Louis, Missouri. The concept of the event was based around the backlash from WrestleMania 41.

Five matches were contested at the event. In the main event, John Cena defeated Randy Orton to retain SmackDown's Undisputed WWE Championship. In other prominent matches, Gunther defeated Pat McAfee by technical submission in what was a featured match for Raw, Lyra Valkyria successfully defended Raw's WWE Women's Intercontinental Championship against Becky Lynch, Dominik Mysterio retained Raw's WWE Intercontinental Championship against Penta, and in the opening bout, Jacob Fatu defeated LA Knight, Damian Priest, and Drew McIntyre in a fatal four-way match to retain SmackDown's WWE United States Championship. The event featured the WWE debut of Jeff Cobb, who previously performed in New Japan Pro-Wrestling and whose ring name was subsequently changed to JC Mateo. This was also Cena's first appearance at a Backlash event since 2009, as well as his last Backlash appearance as an in-ring performer due to his retirement from professional wrestling at the end of 2025.

This was the first Backlash to livestream on Netflix in most markets outside the United States following the WWE Network's merger under the service in January 2025 in those areas, and it would also be the last on the WWE Network in any country, as the last few countries that were still on the service due to pre-existing contracts merged under Netflix on April 1, 2026. It was also the final Backlash to air on Disney+ in the Philippines as it too merged under Netflix on January 1, 2026, as well as the last to air on Peacock in the United States as ESPN's direct-to-consumer streaming service assumed the streaming rights for WWE's main roster PLEs in the US beginning in September.

== Production ==
=== Background ===
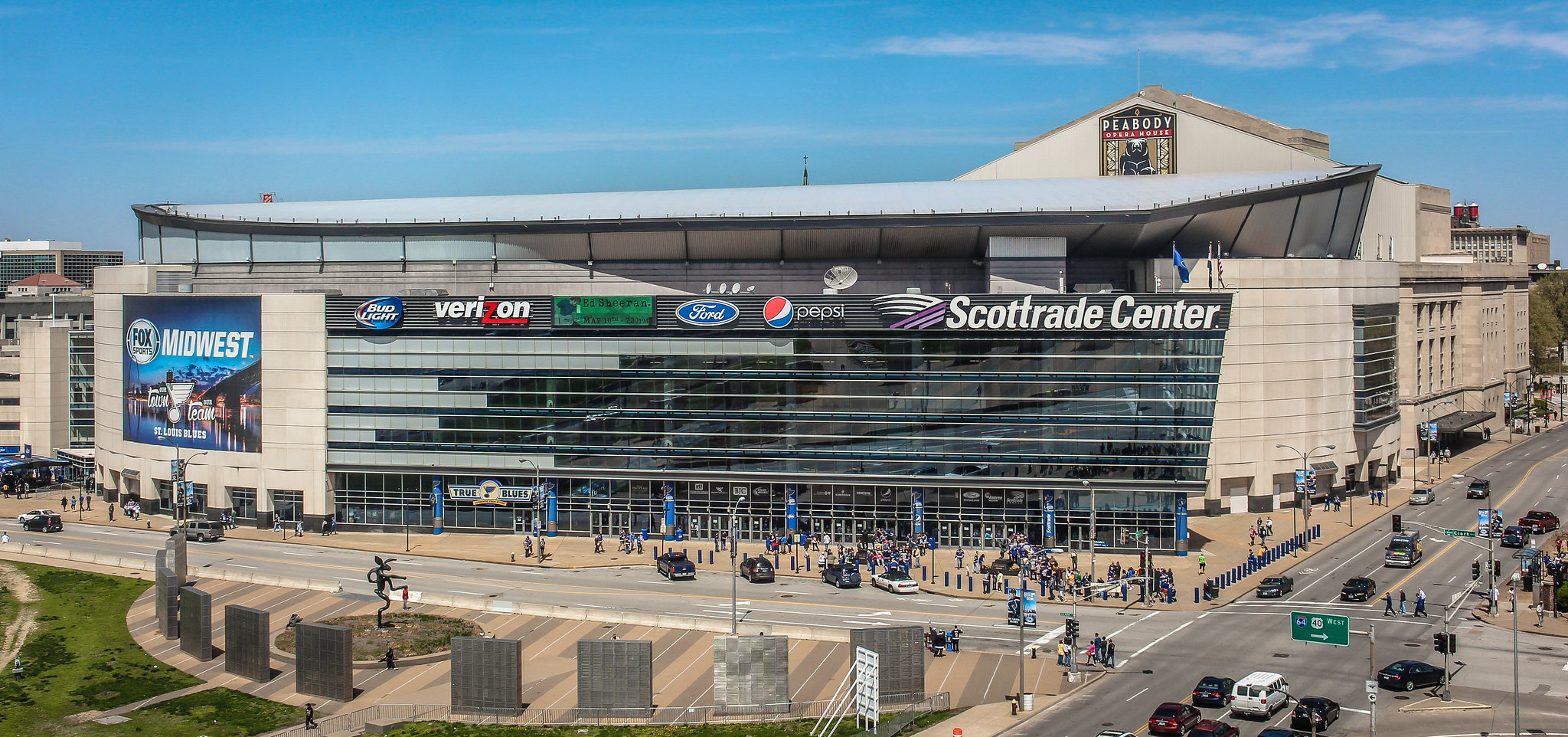
The 20th Backlash was held at the Enterprise Center in St. Louis, Missouri (pictured in 2015 under its previous name of Scottrade Center).

Backlash is a professional wrestling premium live event (PLE) that was established by WWE in 1999. It was held annually from 1999 to 2009, but was then discontinued until it was reinstated in 2016, although an event was not held in 2019. The event was originally broadcast exclusively via pay-per-view (PPV) before it began simulcasting on WWE's livestreaming platforms in 2016. The original concept of the event was based around the backlash from WWE's flagship event, WrestleMania. The events between 2016 and 2020 did not carry this theme; however, the 2021 edition returned the event to this original concept.

On March 14, 2025, WWE announced that the 20th Backlash would take place on Saturday, May 10, 2025, at the Enterprise Center in St. Louis, Missouri, and feature wrestlers from the Raw and SmackDown brand divisions. The event was in turn promoted as Backlash: St. Louis, and was based around the backlash of WrestleMania 41. Tickets went on sale on March 21 via Ticketmaster.

=== Broadcast outlets ===
The PLE was broadcast on traditional PPV outlets worldwide. It was also available to livestream on Peacock in the United States, SuperSport in Sub-Saharan Africa, Disney+ in the Philippines, Abema in Japan, Netflix in most other international markets, and the WWE Network in a select few countries that had not yet transferred to Netflix due to pre-existing contracts. This marked the first Backlash to livestream on Netflix following the WWE Network's merger under the service in January 2025 in those areas.

=== Storylines ===
The event included matches that resulted from scripted storylines. Results were predetermined by WWE's writers on the Raw and SmackDown brands, while storylines were produced on WWE's weekly television shows, Monday Night Raw and Friday Night SmackDown.

In the main event of Night 2 of WrestleMania 41, John Cena won the Undisputed WWE Championship to become a record 17-time WWE world champion. On the following Raw, Cena gloated about his win only for his long-time rival Randy Orton to attack Cena with an RKO. On SmackDown that Friday as Cena was about to cut another promo, he was interrupted by Orton, who tried to reason with the now villainous Cena, who had turned heel at Elimination Chamber back in March. After an exchange of words, Orton challenged Cena to a match for his championship that night; however, Cena declined, stating that the match should happen in Orton's hometown of St. Louis at Backlash. The match was subsequently made official, and was billed as "One Last Time".

Prior to Night 1 of WrestleMania 41, Bayley, who was supposed to team up with Lyra Valkyria for a WWE Women's Tag Team Championship match on Night 2 of the event, was found attacked backstage by an unknown assailant, requiring Valkyria to find a new partner. On Night 2, Becky Lynch made a surprise return as Valkyria's mystery partner and they won the Women's Tag Team Championship. However, in a rematch the next night on Raw, they lost the title with Valkyria taking the pin. Following the match, Lynch attacked Valkyria, turning heel for the first time since 2022. The following week, Lynch revealed that she was the one who attacked Bayley, and she also stated that she attacked Valkyria because of Valkyria's friendship with Bayley, whom Lynch had numerous problems with in recent years. Valkyria interrupted and challenged Lynch to fight her that night, however, Lynch declined. Valkyria then decided to defend her Women's Intercontinental Championship against Lynch at Backlash, who subsequently accepted.

On the Raw the night after WrestleMania 41, Gunther came out and argued with commentators Michael Cole and Pat McAfee as Gunther felt disrespected by them following his loss at WrestleMania. Gunther then attacked Cole which led to McAfee attacking Gunther in Cole's defense, however, Gunther managed to overpower McAfee and choked him out. Gunther was subsequently fined and suspended by Raw General Manager Adam Pearce. The following week, McAfee wanted to fight Gunther and asked SmackDown's General Manager Nick Aldis, who was subbing for Pearce that night, to lift Gunther's suspension. Aldis declined and instead proposed a match between them at Backlash, which McAfee accepted.

At Night 1 of WrestleMania 41, Jacob Fatu defeated LA Knight to win the United States Championship, and a day later at Night 2, Drew McIntyre defeated Damian Priest in a Sin City Street Fight. On the next episode of SmackDown during The Bloodline's (Fatu and Solo Sikoa) celebration, Knight interrupted stating that he wanted his rematch. McIntyre also interrupted, and after taunting Priest, he stated that he also wanted a championship match, with SmackDown General Manager Nick Aldis scheduling a match between Knight and McIntyre later that night to determine the number one contender for Fatu's United States Championship. During the match, Priest attacked McIntyre, while Sikoa attacked Knight, however, the referee only noticed Priest's attack, awarding McIntyre a disqualification victory. Afterwards, Fatu stood tall over Knight and Priest. On the next episode, Knight and Priest faced each other in a no-contest due to interference from Sikoa. Following the match, Priest and Knight brawled with Fatu and Sikoa. Aldis would then schedule a triple threat match between Fatu, Priest, and Knight for the United States Championship at Backlash, however, after Sikoa stated that McIntyre should receive a championship match because of his disqualification win, Aldis scheduled a fatal four-way match for the championship also involving McIntyre at Backlash.

At Night 2 of WrestleMania 41, The Judgment Day's Dominik Mysterio won the Intercontinental Championship in a fatal four-way match also involving Penta and Mysterio's stablemate Finn Bálor, the latter of whom he pinned. On the next episode of Raw, Mysterio successfully defended his championship against Penta after interference from a returning JD McDonagh. On the next episode, Penta interfered in Bálor and McDonagh's tag team match, which costed them the match. A week later, Penta defeated McDonagh despite interference from Bálor and Carlito. Later that night, it was announced that Mysterio would defend his Intercontinental Championship against Penta at Backlash.

== Event ==
Other on-screen personnel
Role:	Name:
English commentators	Michael Cole
English commentators	Wade Barrett
Spanish commentators	Marcelo Rodriguez
Spanish commentators	Jerry Soto
Ring announcer	Alicia Taylor
Referees	Jessika Carr
Referees	Dan Engler
Referees	Dallas Irvin
Referees	Eddie Orengo
Referees	Chad Patton
Interviewer	Byron Saxton
Pre-show panel	Jackie Redmond
Pre-show panel	Big E
Pre-show panel	Peter Rosenberg
Pre-show panel	Vic Joseph

=== Preliminary matches ===
Before the event, Pershard Owens performed "The Star-Spangled Banner".

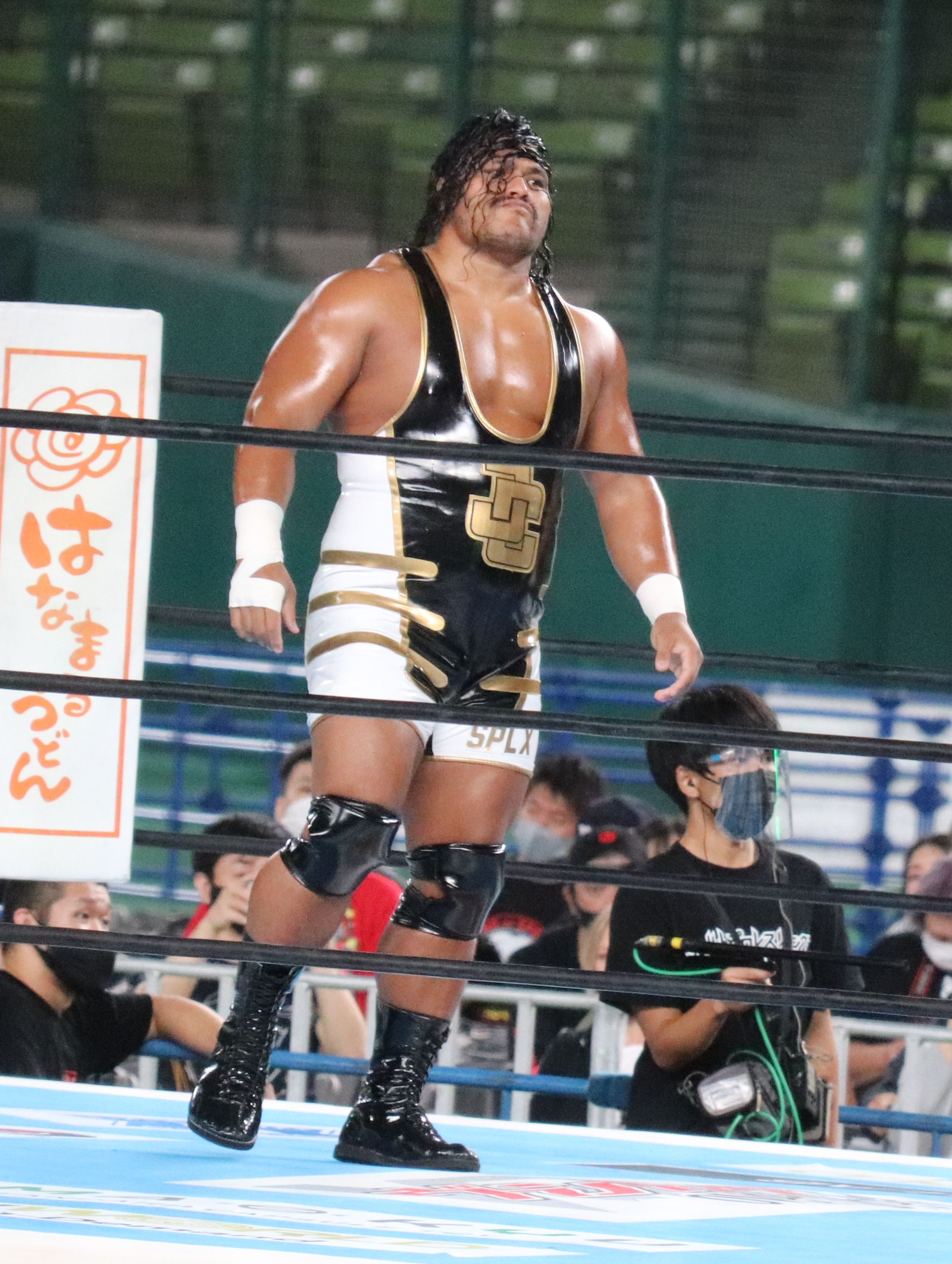
Former New Japan Pro-Wrestling wrestler Jeff Cobb made his WWE debut, assisting Jacob Fatu in defending the WWE United States Championship; his ring name was subsequently changed to JC Mateo.

The PLE began with Jacob Fatu defending the United States Championship against LA Knight, Damian Priest, and Drew McIntyre in a fatal four-way match. During the match, Fatu performed a swanton on McIntyre. Knight performed a BFT on Fatu followed by a South of Heaven by Priest on Knight and a Claymore by McIntyre on Priest, who fell into a pin on Knight, with McIntyre breaking it up. McIntyre performed Future Shock DDTs on Fatu and Knight. McIntyre performed a Claymore on Knight, but Priest pulled the referee out of the ring. With McIntyre and Priest fighting outside the ring, Knight performed two elbow drops on Fatu for a nearfall. Priest performed a South of Heaven on McIntyre through tables. Knight attempted an elbow drop on Fatu through a table, but Solo Sikoa pulled Fatu to safety. Jeff Cobb, making his WWE debut, then attacked Knight. Fatu pinned Knight following a moonsault to retain the title.

After that, Lyra Valkyria defended the Women's Intercontinental Championship against Becky Lynch. Valkyria attempted a moonsault, but Lynch got her knees up. Lynch performed a Manhandle Slam on Valkyria for a nearfall. In the end, Valkyria attempted Nightwing, but Lynch blocked and struck Valkyria in the nose. Valkyria countered a pinning combination into her own to retain the title. After the match, Lynch attacked Valkyria.

In the third match, Dominik Mysterio defended the Intercontinental Championship against Penta. During the match, Carlito, JD McDonagh, and Finn Bálor showed up at ringside. As Bálor grabbed a chair, he, McDonagh, and Carlito were ejected from ringside. In the end, as Penta went to the middle rope, El Grande Americano performed a headbutt on Penta, allowing Mysterio to perform a Frog Splash and pin Penta to retain the title.

In the penultimate match, Gunther faced Pat McAfee. After Gunther dominated most of the match, McAfee performed a Punt Kick on Gunther for a one count. In the closing moments, McAfee applied a sleeper hold on Gunther, who escaped and performed a lariat on McAfee. Gunther then applied the sleeper hold on McAfee, who passed out, to win the match. After the match, Gunther gave McAfee a show of respect.

=== Main event ===
In the main event, John Cena defended the Undisputed WWE Championship against Randy Orton. Throughout the match, Cena and Orton executed their respective moves. At one point, Cena attempted a Punt Kick, but Orton moved out of the way. Cena performed an Attitude Adjustment on Orton and grabbed the title belt. Orton then performed an RKO on Cena for a nearfall. Orton performed an Attitude Adjustment on Cena through the announce table and another through a table he retrieved. Orton then performed another RKO for a nearfall. In the climax, Cena charged at Orton with the belt, but struck the referee. Orton then performed another RKO on Cena, but with no referee to count the pin, Orton performed RKOs on Nick Aldis and producers. As Orton attempted another Punt Kick, R-Truth blocked Orton, who laid out R-Truth with an RKO. Cena then performed a low blow on Orton and struck him with the title belt to retain the title. After the match, Cena proclaimed that he was what a real world champion looked like.

== Reception ==
Wade Keller of Pro Wrestling Torch stated that the main event's first portion "was rudimentary to a fault", but in character for John Cena and Randy Orton's "styles, especially at this point in their careers". As the match progressed, "fans got more into it", and Keller was not bothered with the ref bumps "because the expectations for Orton and Cena telling this story straight-up isn't really there, so a lot of outside stuff and controversy was likely and, ultimately, worked". Shakiel Mahjouri of CBS Sports gave the match a grade of A−, stating that it was not "a technical thriller", but "there's a charm to seeing an iconic rivalry's final chapter after 20 years". With the match being physical with high stakes and a hot crowd, it "was an overbooked throwback to WWE's heavily used playbook in the 2010s". John Canton, reviewing for TJRwrestling.com, gave the show an overall score of 7.25 out of 10, calling it "a pretty good show most of the way" whilst noting it sat below the generally high average of quality WWE PLE's had been reaching. He gave the main event a score of 3.25 stars, enjoying the "nearfalls and the counts with no referee", and stated that whilst Cena's win will "frustrate fans", it embodied Cena's new role as a heel.

Canton gave his most positive remarks towards the Women's Intercontinental Championship match, calling it an "excellent match" and positively noted its use of counter wrestling, expressing his excitement for Lyra's further development in WWE.

For the United States Championship match, Mahjouri gave it a grade of A, stating that the "finish hit all the right marks: giving the champ a win, protecting the challengers, debuting a new act, and furthering The Bloodline storyline". Canton was also positive, praising everyone in the match and its overall "twists and turns", but looked negatively on the match-ending interference, giving the match a score of 3.75 stars.

Wrestling Observer Newsletter's Dave Meltzer rated the United States Championship fatal four-way match 4.25 stars, the Women's Intercontinental Championship 4.25 stars, the Intercontinental Championship match 3.5 stars, Gunther vs. McAfee 3.25 stars, and the Undisputed WWE Championship match 3.25 stars.

== Aftermath ==
During the Backlash post-event press conference, WWE Chief Content Officer Paul "Triple H" Levesque commented on Damian Priest's South of Heaven Chokeslam on Drew McIntyre, stating that McIntyre was "banged up but totally fine".

Also during the press conference, R-Truth interrupted Undisputed WWE Champion John Cena's promo. This led to Cena performing an Attitude Adjustment on R-Truth through a table.

=== Raw ===
Following his loss at Backlash, Penta faced and defeated Chad Gable on the following episode of Raw.

Also on Raw, Becky Lynch addressed her loss to Women's Intercontinental Champion Lyra Valkyria, who cost Lynch a Money in the Bank qualifying match the following week. Lynch and Valkyria were subsequently scheduled for another title match at Money in the Bank.

=== SmackDown ===
On the following episode of SmackDown, as a result of John Cena's attack on R-Truth during the Backlash post-show, a non-title match between them was scheduled for Saturday Night's Main Event XXXIX.

It was also announced that Drew McIntyre would face Damian Priest in a Steel Cage match at Saturday Night's Main Event XXXIX.

Also on SmackDown, Solo Sikoa introduced Jeff Cobb, renamed as JC Mateo, as a new ally of The Bloodline. Mateo subsequently defeated LA Knight in a match.

=== Broadcasting changes ===
In continuing WWE's near worldwide transition to Netflix, this would be the final Backlash to air on Disney+ in the Philippines before moving to Netflix on January 1, 2026. Throughout 2025, many of the select few countries that were still on the WWE Network due to pre-existing contracts gradually merged to Netflix with nearly all international markets on Netflix by January 1, 2026. The last few remaining countries that were still on the WWE Network merged under Netflix on April 1, 2026, making this 2025 event the last Backlash to air on the WWE Network in any country. Additionally, on August 6, 2025, WWE announced that ESPN's direct-to-consumer streaming service would assume the streaming rights of WWE's main roster PLEs in the United States. This was originally to begin with WrestleMania 42 in April 2026, but was pushed up to September 2025 with Wrestlepalooza. As such, this was the last Backlash to livestream on Peacock in the US.

== Results ==
No.	Results	Stipulations	Times
1	Jacob Fatu (c) defeated LA Knight, Damian Priest, and Drew McIntyre by pinfall	Fatal four-way match for the WWE United States Championship	17:55
2	Lyra Valkyria (c) defeated Becky Lynch by pinfall	Singles match for the WWE Women's Intercontinental Championship	18:45
3	Dominik Mysterio (c) defeated Penta by pinfall	Singles match for the WWE Intercontinental Championship	9:20
4	Gunther defeated Pat McAfee by technical submission	Singles match	14:00
5	John Cena (c) defeated Randy Orton by pinfall	Singles match for the Undisputed WWE Championship	27:50
(c) / – the champion(s) heading into the match
