= Anoaʻi family =

Professional wrestling family

The Anoaʻi family (Samoan: [anoˈaʔi]) is a family of professional wrestlers originating from the Samoan Islands. Family members have comprised several tag teams and stables within a variety of promotions, most notably WWE. Famous members of the family include Roman Reigns and WWE Hall of Famers Rikishi, Yokozuna, and the Wild Samoans (Afa and Sika). Other notable members include The Usos (Jimmy and Jey Uso), Umaga, Rosey, Jacob Fatu, Zilla Fatu and Solo Sikoa.

Reverend Amituanaʻi Anoaʻi and Peter Maivia were blood brothers, a connection that continued with Amituanaʻi's sons Afa and Sika, who regarded Peter as their uncle. Peter married Ofelia "Lia" Fuataga, who already had a daughter named Ata, whom he adopted and raised as his own. Ata married wrestler Rocky Johnson, and the couple became the parents of Dwayne Johnson, who wrestled as Rocky Maivia and The Rock before establishing himself as an actor. Dwayne's daughter, Simone Johnson, previously performed in WWE as Ava. Peter's first cousin, Joseph Fanene, was the father of Savelina Fanene, who is known in WWE as Nia Jax. Trinity Fatu, known in WWE as Naomi, married into the family by marrying Jimmy Uso. Jimmy Snuka is related by marriage, having been married to Sharon Georgi, the daughter of a Samoan chief who was also blood brothers with Peter Maivia and Reverend Anoaʻi, effectively making her their niece. Jimmy's children Sarona Snuka, known as Tamina, and Jimmy Snuka Jr, known as Deuce or Sim Snuka, have both wrestled for WWE. Dwayne Johnson considers Tonga ʻUliʻuli Fifita, known in wrestling as Haku, his uncle. Tonga's sons Tama Tonga, Tonga Loa, and Talla Tonga (Hikuleo), and their cousin Bad Luck Fale, have all wrestled for New Japan Pro-Wrestling.

Although not a member of the Anoaʻi family, Paul Heyman has served as the manager of several members of the family, including Rikishi and Roman Reigns.

== Anoaʻi family tree ==
Tovaleomanaia Amituanaʻi (Leoso Ripley) (1920–1988)	Amituanaʻi Anoaʻi (1914–1994)	Fanene Anderson (Peter Maivia) (1937–1982)	Ofelia Fuataga (Lia Maivia) (1931–2008)
Lynn Anoaʻi	Afa Anoaʻi Sr. (Afa Anoaʻi) (1943–2024)	Tumua Anoaʻi	Afoa Anoaʻi	Leati Anoaʻi Amituanaʻi (Sika Anoaʻi) (1945–2024)	Lisa Anoaʻi Sr.	Sipa Anoaʻi	Elevera Anoaʻi (Vera) (1947–2008)	Iʻaulualo Folau Solofa Fatu Sr. (1945–2020)	Toa Maivia	Mataniufeagaimaleata Fitisemanu (Ata Maivia)	Rocky Johnson (1944–2020)
Reno Anoaʻi (Black Pearl)	Rodney Anoaʻi (Yokozuna) (1966–2000)	Matthew Anoaʻi (Rosey) (1970–2017)	Leati Joseph "Joe" Anoaʻi (Roman Reigns)	Samuel Fatu (Samoan Savage/Tonga Kid/Tama)	Edward Fatu (Umaga/Jamal) (1973–2009)	Solofa Fatu Jr. (Rikishi/Fatu)	Talisua Fuavai	Dwayne Johnson (Rocky Maivia/The Rock)	Dany Garcia
Samula Anoaʻi (Samu)	Afa Anoaʻi Jr. (Manu)	Bernadette Anoaʻi-Shroyer	Lloyd Anoaʻi (L.A. Smooth)	Monica Anoaʻi	Gary Albright (1963–2000)	Jacob Fatu	Journey Fatu	Isayah Fatu (Zilla Fatu)	Trinity Fatu (Naomi)	Jonathan Fatu (Jimmy Uso)	Joshua Fatu (Jey Uso)	Thavana Monalisa Fatu	Jeremiah Peniata Fatu	Joseph Yokozuna "Sefa" Fatu (Solo Sikoa)	Simone Johnson (Ava)
Lance Anoaʻi

== Other members ==
Peter Maivia Jr., son of Peter Maivia, wrestled for NWA Polynesian Pro Wrestling. Hollywood stuntman Tanoai Reed (known as Toa on the American Gladiators) is the great nephew of Peter's wife Lia Maivia, while professional wrestler Lina Fanene (Nia Jax) is Dwayne Johnson's second cousin once removed. Ricky Johnson, Rocky Johnson's brother, was also a professional wrestler.

Dwayne Johnson's daughter Simone performed in WWE's developmental brand NXT as Ava (shortened from her previous ring name Ava Raine) between 2020 and 2026. She was the on-screen general manager of NXT from 2024 until her departure. Afa Anoaʻi's daughter, Lynn Toval Anoaʻi (Vale Anoaʻi), is an author and artist. Vale's husband wrestles for World Xtreme Wrestling as Vertigo "The Cure" Rivera.

Journey Fatu, son of Sam Fatu, wrestles primarily in deathmatches.

Thamiko T. Fatu, son of Rikishi, wrestles on the independent circuit.

Damu Anoa'i, nephew of Yokozuna, wrestles on the independent circuit.

Sean Maluta, Afa's nephew, was a participant in WWE's Cruiserweight Classic tournament.

Jimmy Snuka was a member of the Anoa'i family though his marriage to Sharon Georgi. Their two children, Jimmy Snuka Jr. (otherwise known as Deuce) and Tamina Snuka, would also wrestle for WWE.

Boxer David Tua is related to the family.

== Tag teams and stables ==
=== 3-Minute Warning ===
In WWE from 2002 to 2003, Matt Anoaʻi and Eddie Fatu formed a tag team using the names Rosey and Jamal, respectively. 3-Minute Warning acted as enforcers for Raw brand General Manager Eric Bischoff. The team was used to squash any activity in the ring that Bischoff deemed "boring". Bischoff would often cue the team's surprise entrances by uttering the phrase "three minutes".

=== Samoan Gangstas ===
Samoan Gangstas

Tag team
- Members: Matt E. Smalls; L.A. Smooth
- Name: Samoan Gangstas
- Billed heights: 6 ft 4 in (1.93 m) - Matt; 6 ft 2 in (1.88 m) - Lloyd
- Combined billed weight: 713 lb (323 kg; 50.9 st)
- Debut: 1997
- Disbanded: 1998
- Trained by: Wild Samoan Training Center

Samoan Gangstas was a tag team in the independent promotion World Xtreme Wrestling (WXW). The tag team consisted of members from the Anoaʻi family.

Samoan Gangstas was a tag team made up of brothers from another mothers Matt E. Smalls and Sweet Sammy Silk (Matt and Samu Anoaʻi). Their tag team was formed in 1997 in WXW, the promotion of one half of The Wild Samoans, Samu's father and Matt's uncle Afa Anoaʻi. The duo received success in WXW in the tag team division. On June 24, they won their first WXW Tag Team Championship by beating Love Connection (Sweet Daddy Jay Love and Georgie Love). However, they were temporarily suspended and the title was declared vacant. Matt was repackaged as Matty Smalls. They returned in the summer of 1997 and defeated Siberian Express (The Mad Russian and Russian Eliminator), on September 17 to win their second WXW Tag Team Championship.

Problems began between Smalls and Smooth. The two partners began feuding with each other and could not focus properly on their tag title. On March 27, 1998, Smooth defeated Smalls in a Loser Leaves Town match. As a result of losing this match, Smalls was forced to leave the promotion. He left WXW while Smooth focused on a singles career. After a short while, Smalls returned to WXW and the two partners reunited again as Samoan Gangstas and began teaming in the tag team division. They feuded with several tag teams in WXW and focused to regain the WXW Tag Team Championship. However, due to their family disputes and problems with each other, they did not take part in the tournament for the vacated tag title, and instead feuded with each other. Samoan Gangstas feuded with each other after their splitting until Smalls left WXW and began wrestling as Kimo. He began teaming with Ekmo (Eddie Fatu) as The Island Boyz and the duo worked in Frontier Martial-Arts Wrestling (FMW) before signing with World Wrestling Entertainment (WWE) and working in its developmental territories.

== See also ==
- List of family relations in professional wrestling
