= Black Pearl (wrestler) =

American professional wrestler

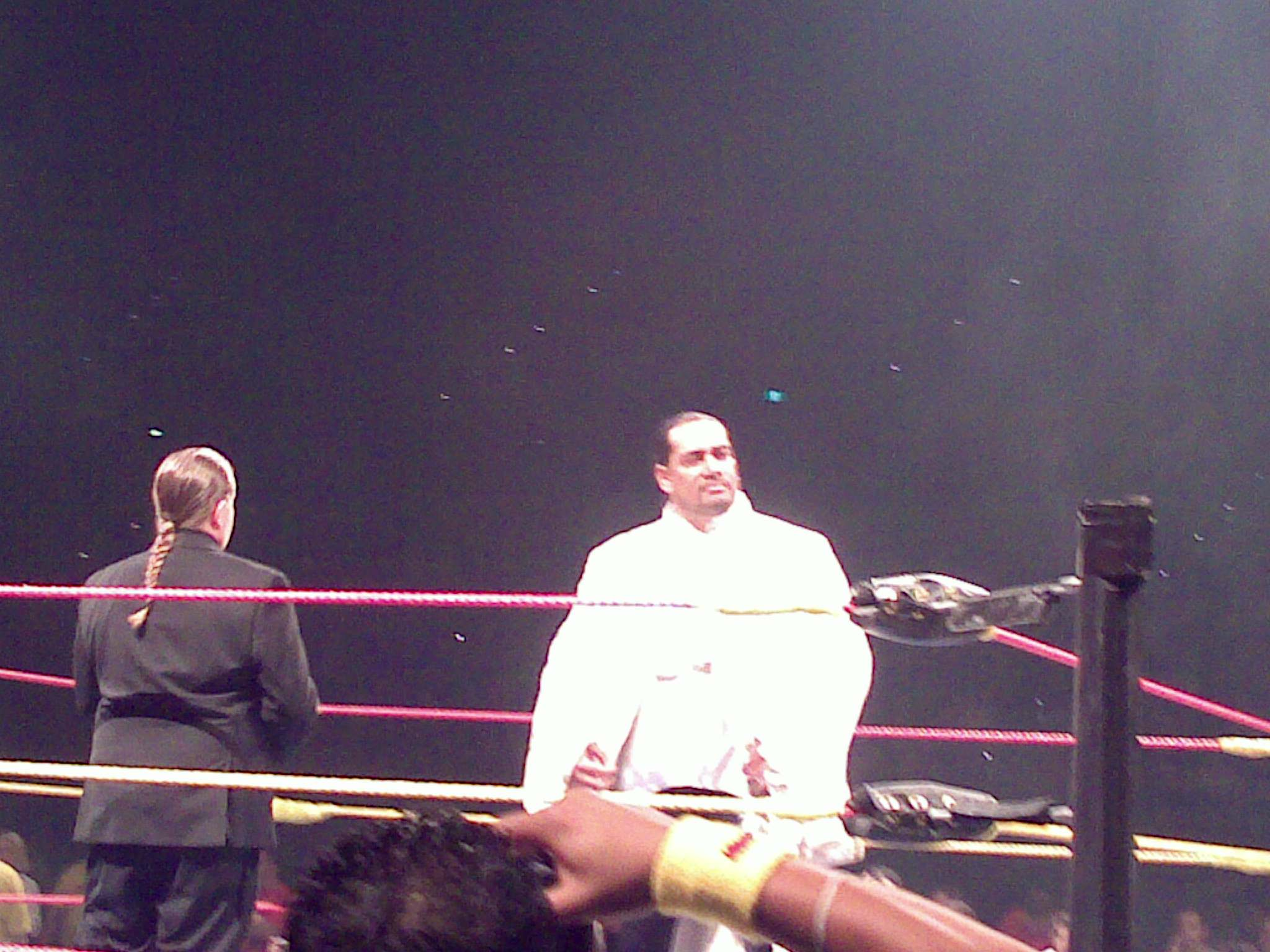
- Anoa'i in 2009

Personal information
- Born: Reno Anoaʻi; September 3, 1968 (age 58) Whitehall, Pennsylvania, U.S.
- Family: Anoaʻi

Professional wrestling career
- Ring name(s): Black Pearl; Reno the Black Pearl
- Billed height: 6 ft 5 in (196 cm)
- Billed weight: 251 lb (114 kg)
- Billed from: Samoa; California
- Trained by: Afa Anoaʻi; Sika Anoaʻi
- Debut: April 6, 2003
- Retired: July 27, 2018

Reno Anoaʻi (born September 3, 1968) is an American retired professional wrestler and a member of the Anoaʻi family wrestling under the ring name Black Pearl. He is best known for his time in Nu-Wrestling Evolution in Italy and their heavyweight champion for 376 days.

== Professional wrestling career ==
Anoaʻi trained under his uncles Afa and Sika, making his wrestling debut on April 6, 2003 under the name Black Pearl at Afa and Sika's promotion World Xtreme Wrestling in Pennsylvania where he would pick up a victory over Josh Daniels.

In 2005, Anoa'i went to Italy and joined his cousin Rikishi in Nu-Wrestling Evolution. In NWE, Anoa'i adopts an aristocratic character, becoming known as " The Count of California ". He won and became the first NWE World Heavyweight Champion on November 26, 2005 when he defeated Scott Steiner in the tournament finals. He held the title for a year 376 days and had successful title defenses against Charlie Haas, Vampire Warrior, Christian Cage, Heidenreich, Orlando Jordan, Darksole, and the UK Pitbulls (Big Dave and Bulk). He would drop the title to Vampiro on December 6. After the title lost, Black returned to the United States and worked in the independent circuit.

Black Pearl also worked in Australia in 2007.

In November 2009, Pearl worked wrestled in the Hulkamania: Let The Battle Begin where had matches against the Nasty Boys, Rikishi and Brian Christopher.

He also owns and operates KnokX Pro Entertainment and Academy in Los Angeles since 2009, with trainers Rikishi and Gangrel. He would wrestle for his own promotion from 2012 to 2017.

His final match on July 27, 2018, where he, Rikishi, and Vincenza Iosefa Parisi defeated Devin Danger, El Guerrero, and Kaka Meng at Big Time Wrestling In Newark, California.

== Personal life ==
Anoa'i is the son of Tumua Anoa'i, who is the eldest brother of Afa and Sika Anoa'i.

Black Pearl created the concept of the Territory League and is partnered up with Née Leau in F3 production Company that produced Territory League, full Faction Fighting and various reality shows.

== Championships and accomplishments ==
- Nu-Wrestling Evolution
  - NWE World Heavyweight Championship (1 time)

== See also ==
- Anoaʻi family
