= Culling (disambiguation) =

Culling is the process of removing animals from a group based on specific criteria.

Culling or The Culling may also refer to:

== People ==
- Lady Anne Culling Smith (1768–1844), Anglo-Irish aristocrat
- Anya Culling (born 1998), English marathon runner
- Charles Culling Smith (c. 1775–1853), British politician
- Sir Culling Eardley, 3rd Baronet (1805–1863), an English Christian campaigner for religious freedom and for the Protestant cause
- Gary Culling (born 1972), British soccer player
- Hubert William Culling Carr-Gomm (1877–1939), British politician
- Hugh Culling Eardley Childers (1827–1896), British statesman
- Robert Culling Hanbury (1823–1867), British politician
- Thomas Culling (1896–1917), New Zealand's first World War I flying ace

== Entertainment ==
- The Culling (film), a 2015 supernatural thriller film
- The Culling (comics)
- The Culling (video game), a 2017 first-person shooter
- The Culling, a 2009 episode from Sons of Anarchy
- The Culling, professional wrestling stable group in WWE leadered by Shawn Spears
- The Culling (Warcraft), a level in the strategy game Warcraft III: Reign of Chaos

== Other uses ==
- Culling (computer graphics), a rendering technique
