= Saturday Night's Main Event XLII =

2025 WWE special event

- Promotional poster featuring John Cena
- Promotion: WWE
- Brand(s): Raw; SmackDown; NXT
- Date: December 13, 2025
- City: Washington, D.C.
- Venue: Capital One Arena
- Attendance: 19,274
- Tagline: The Last Real Champion. One Last Time.

WWE event chronology
← Previous; NXT Deadline	Next → Saturday Night's Main Event XLIII

Saturday Night's Main Event chronology
← Previous; XLI	Next → XLIII

Saturday Night's Main Event XLII, also promoted as Saturday Night's Main Event: John Cena's Final Match, was a 2025 professional wrestling television special produced by WWE, held for wrestlers from the promotion's Raw, SmackDown, and NXT brand divisions. It was the 42nd edition of the periodic Saturday Night's Main Event series and was livestreamed exclusively on Peacock in the United States and YouTube internationally. The event took place on December 13, 2025, from the Capital One Arena in Washington, D.C. and was the first edition of the special to include wrestlers from NXT as well as a wrestler from partner promotion Total Nonstop Action Wrestling (TNA).

The event featured John Cena's final match in his 26-year professional wrestling career. His opponent was determined by a 16-man single-elimination tournament between wrestlers from Raw, SmackDown, NXT, and TNA titled The Last Time Is Now Tournament, which was ultimately won by Raw's Gunther. In addition to Cena's final match, the card saw exhibition matches that pitted wrestlers from WWE's main roster brands Raw and SmackDown against those from its developmental brand NXT, as well as one wrestler from TNA, a decision by Cena to showcase up-and-coming talent.

Four matches were contested at the event. In the main event, Gunther defeated Cena via submission, which was the latter's first submission loss since No Way Out in 2004. In the other three matches contested on the undercard, Raw's World Tag Team Champions AJ Styles and Dragon Lee defeated NXT's Je'Von Evans and TNA's Leon Slater in a non-title tag team match, NXT's Sol Ruca defeated Raw's Bayley, and in the opening bout, SmackDown's Undisputed WWE Champion Cody Rhodes faced NXT Champion Oba Femi in a non-title match that ended in a no contest due to interference from Drew McIntyre.

== Production ==
=== Background ===
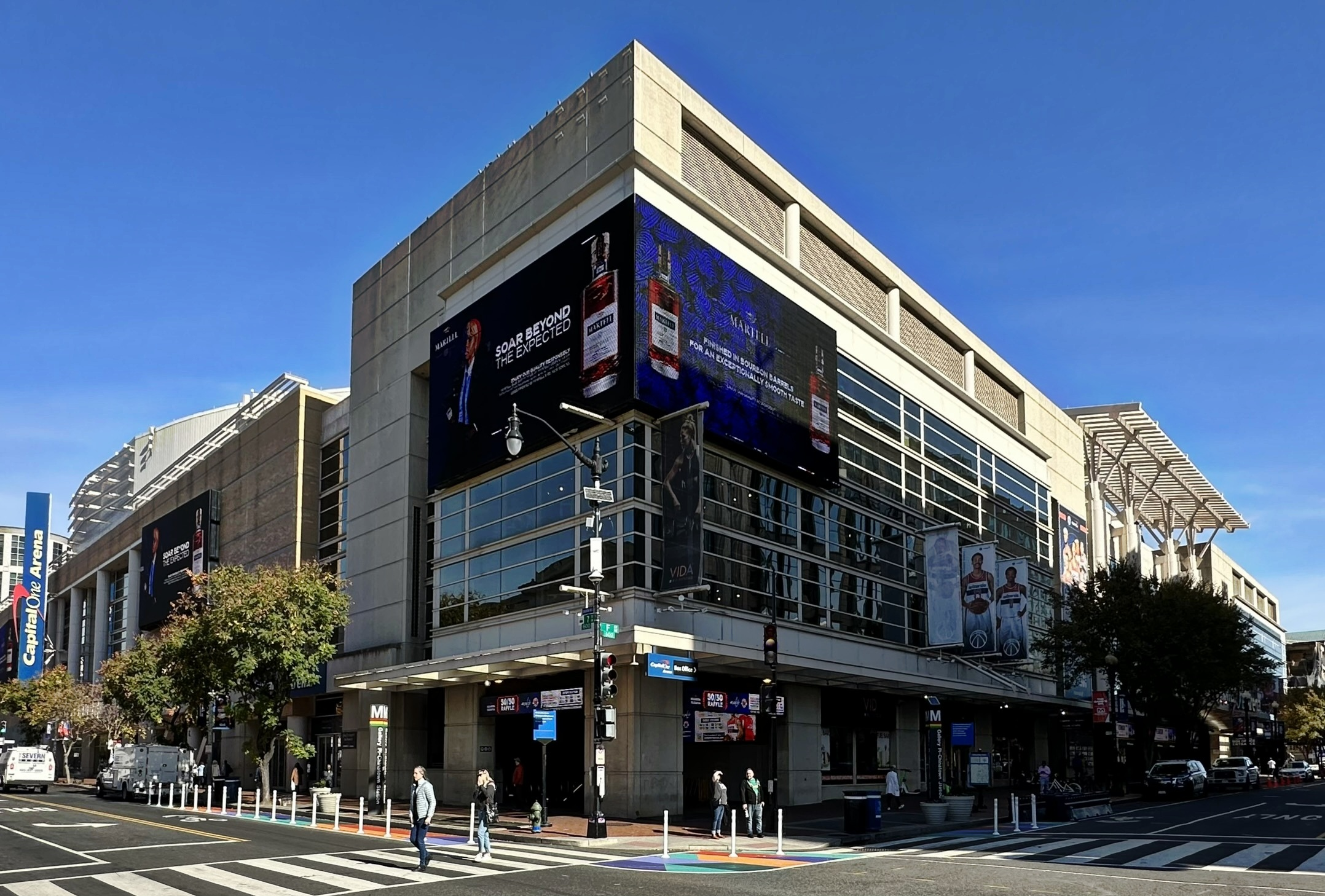
The 42nd Saturday Night's Main Event special was held at the Capital One Arena in Washington, D.C.

Saturday Night's Main Event is a series of American professional wrestling television specials produced by WWE via NBC. The series was originally broadcast from 1985 to 1992, with the 1992 events produced by Fox, and were briefly held again from 2006 to 2008 by NBC. In December 2024, as part of NBC's acquisition of rights to air Friday Night SmackDown on the USA Network in the United States, Saturday Night's Main Event was also reinstated to be simulcast on USA and NBC's streaming service Peacock in the United States, with WWE's YouTube channel streaming the program internationally.

In August 2025, after Peacock lost the rights to WWE's main roster premium live events (PLE) in the United States to ESPN, it was revealed that Saturday Night's Main Event would move exclusively to Peacock in the US under a multi-year deal beginning in November 2025, with the 42nd edition of the program on December 13, 2025, featuring John Cena's retirement match. In May 2025, it had been reported that WWE were considering to host the event in Boston, Massachusetts due to Cena being from West Newbury (about 40 miles from Boston), but during the September 29 episode of Monday Night Raw, it was confirmed that Saturday Night's Main Event XLII would take place at the Capital One Arena in Washington, D.C. The event was also promoted as Saturday Night's Main Event: John Cena's Final Match.

=== Storylines ===
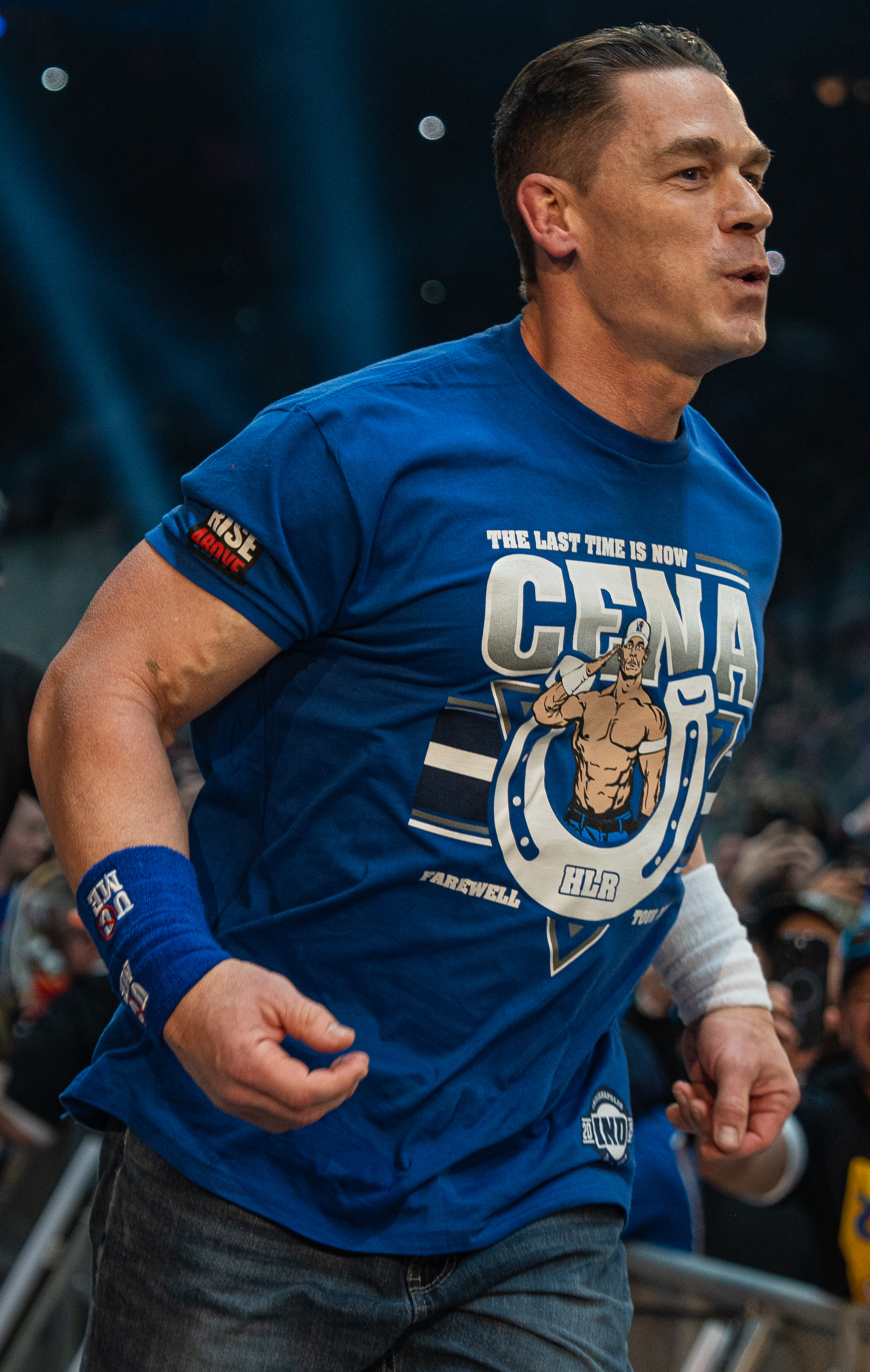
John Cena wrestled the final match of his 26-year professional wrestling career in the main event of the show.

The event included four matches that resulted from scripted storylines. Results were predetermined by WWE's writers on the Raw, SmackDown, and NXT brands, while storylines were produced on WWE's weekly television shows, Monday Night Raw, Friday Night SmackDown, and Tuesday night's NXT.

At Money in the Bank in July 2024, John Cena, who had been signed to WWE since 2001 and performing on its main roster since 2002, announced that he would retire from in-ring competition at the end of 2025. During the Raw premiere on Netflix on January 6, 2025, Cena officially kicked off his retirement tour that would go through December and consist of 36 dates, which included appearances and matches.

Throughout the tour, Cena achieved some notable accolades to cap off his career. At Elimination Chamber in March, he turned heel for the first time since November 2003 by low-blowing Cody Rhodes and aligning with The Rock and Travis Scott. At WrestleMania 41 in April, he won the Undisputed WWE Championship for a record 14th time, which also made him a record-setting 17-time world champion in WWE, and he became the eighth heel to win a WrestleMania main event; he held the title until SummerSlam, turning back to face for the first time since March 2025, right before the event. On the November 10 episode of Raw in Boston, he defeated Dominik Mysterio to win the WWE Intercontinental Championship for the first time, which also made him a WWE Triple Crown and WWE Grand Slam champion; he lost the title back to Mysterio at Survivor Series: WarGames later that month.

In August 2025, it had been officially announced that Cena's last match would take place at Saturday Night's Main Event XLII on December 13, and it was later confirmed that his final opponent would be decided in The Last Time Is Now tournament, which began on the November 10 episode of Raw. The tournament featured wrestlers from WWE's Raw, SmackDown, and NXT brands, and WWE's partner promotion Total Nonstop Action Wrestling (TNA). The final of The Last Time Is Now tournament took place on the December 5 episode of SmackDown, where Raw's Gunther defeated LA Knight, also from Raw, to become Cena's final opponent at the event. Also on the November 10 episode of Raw, Cena announced a series of exhibition matches that would feature NXT wrestlers against main roster wrestlers from Raw and SmackDown, a decision by Cena; instead of having the entire show dedicated to him, he wanted to use the event to showcase up-and-coming wrestlers.

On the December 5 episode of SmackDown, Undisputed WWE Champion Cody Rhodes announced to NXT Champion Ricky Saints and Oba Femi that the winner of their title match the following night at NXT Deadline would face him during Saturday Night's Main Event in a Champion vs. Champion non-title match. Femi subsequently defeated Saints to win the NXT Championship and face Rhodes. Also on the December 5 episode of SmackDown, it was announced that Raw's Bayley would face NXT's Sol Ruca at the event. Three nights later on Raw, it was announced that Raw's World Tag Team Champions AJ Styles and Dragon Lee would face NXT's Je'Von Evans and TNA's Leon Slater in a non-title match at the event.

== Event ==
Other on-screen personnel
Role	Name
Hosts	Joe Tessitore
Hosts	Stephanie McMahon
English commentators	Michael Cole
English commentators	Wade Barrett
Spanish commentators	Marcelo Rodriguez
Spanish commentators	Jerry Soto
Ring announcer	Lilian Garcia
Referees	Danilo Anfibio
Referees	Shawn Bennett
Referees	Dan Engler
Referees	Chad Patton
Interviewers	Cathy Kelley
Interviewers	Jackie Redmond
Interviewers	Byron Saxton
Pre-show panel	Joe Tessitore
Pre-show panel	Wade Barrett
Pre-show panel	Big E
Pre-show panel	Peter Rosenberg

=== Preliminary matches ===
The event began with a Champion vs. Champion match, where NXT Champion Oba Femi faced off against Undisputed WWE Champion Cody Rhodes. This was Femi's first match in the main roster. Femi used his size advantage to overpower Rhodes early into the match. Rhodes sent Femi into the ringpost, and performed a powerslam and the Cody Cutter for a nearfall. Femi performed an uppercut to counter a suicide dive attempt by Rhodes; however, Rhodes performed with a suicide dive in his second attempt. As Rhodes attempted to perform another suicide dive but Femi perform a spinebuster ON Rhodes in the ring. Femi then clotheslined Rhodes over the top rope, followed by a sprinting European uppercut on the outside that sent Rhodes crashing into the announce desk, causing Rhodes to bleed heavily from his ear. Back in the ring, Femi performed a chokeslam for a near-fall. Rhodes eventually countered Femi's attempted pop-up move into a second Cody Cutter for a near-fall. The match ended in a no contest when Drew McIntyre interfered and attacked Rhodes. Femi, enraged by the interruption, immediately confronted and shoved McIntyre. Rhodes and Femi then cooperated to fend off McIntyre, and performed a cutter and a chokeslam, respectively. After dispatching McIntyre, Rhodes showed a sign of respect by presenting the NXT Championship belt back to Femi, and the two champions stood together in celebration.

Next, Bayley, who was accompanied by Lyra Valkyria, fought NXT's Sol Ruca, who was accompanied by Zaria. The match began with technical wrestling as Bayley controlled Ruca's arm. Ruca countered with a flipping headscissors and the X-Factor (a sitout facebuster), before performing a handspring over the top rope onto Bayley outside the ring. Bayley performed the Bayley to Belly and later the Rose Plant on Ruca however, Ruca's foot was on the rope to void the pin. Ruca raised her knees up to counter a top rope elbow drop by Bayley and then performed the Sol Snatcher on Bayley. Bayley attempted to roll through Ruca's pin, but Ruca regained control to secure the victory.

Next, AJ Styles and Dragon Lee fought NXT's Je'Von Evans and TNA X Division Champion Leon Slater. Evans and Slater started the match at an extremely high pace. They isolated Lee with quick tags and fast-paced offense. Lee managed to escape and sent Evans to the outside, then countered Slater with a sit-out powerbomb. The teams exchanged dives to the outside. Back in the ring, Evans connected with a springboard cutter, immediately followed by a swanton 450 splash from Slater. Dragon Lee broke up the subsequent pin attempt. Lee dove onto Evans outside the ring. Inside, Styles attempted to hit the Styles Clash on Slater, but Slater broke free. Styles then attempted the Phenomenal Forearm but slipped on the top rope. Styles quickly recovered, catching Slater and successfully executing the Styles Clash to secure the pinfall victory.

During a segment before the main event, The Miz interrupted hosts Stephanie McMahon and Joe Tessitore. He expressed frustration over being excluded from the event, citing his WrestleMania XXVII victory over John Cena. R-Truth then appeared to accuse The Miz of stealing a spot in The Last Time Is Now tournament. Truth presented Miz with a ball containing the name of the person whose opportunity he had stolen. That name was Joe Hendry. Hendry made a surprise appearance, confronting and attacking The Miz. R-Truth and Hendry then teamed up to hit a double Five-Knuckle Shuffle on Miz. Hendry hit the Standing Ovation, and R-Truth comically counted the pinfall.

=== Main event ===
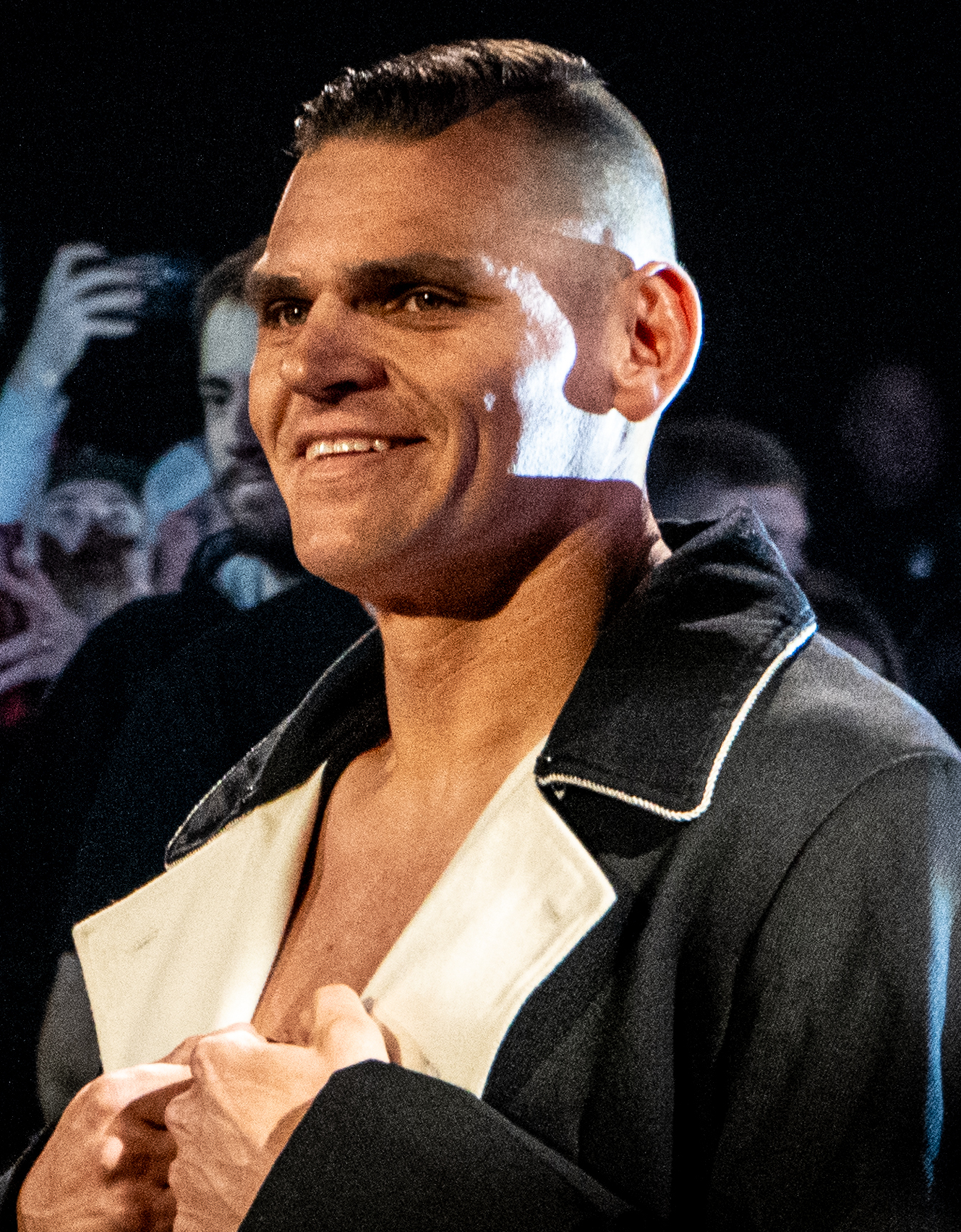
Gunther was Cena's final opponent. In the main event, he made Cena tap out for the first time in almost 22 years.

In the main event, John Cena fought against Gunther in Cena's retirement match. During the match, Gunther performed European uppercuts and heavy chops on Cena. Cena performed the Five-Knuckle Shuffle on Gunther and attempted a Attitude Adjustment, only for Gunther to counter with a suplex and apply the sleeper hold on Cena who escaped. Cena applied the STFU; however, Gunther reached the ring ropes to void the submission. Gunther performed a powerbomb and four consecutive clotheslines on Cena. As Gunther attempted a fifth clothesline, Cena avoided it and performed a second Five-Knuckle Shuffle and Attitude Adjustment on Gunther for a nearfall. At ringside, Cena countered a powerbomb attempt and performed a second Attitude Adjustment on Gunther through the table. Cena performed a leg drop from the top rope and a Super Attitude Adjustment from the middle rope on Gunther for a nearfall. Gunther countered a third Attitude Adjustment attempt with a powerbomb and a Frog Splash on Cena for a nearfall. In the closing moments, Gunther repeatedly applied the sleeper hold on Cena who repeatedly escaped; however, Cena eventually tapped out. As a result, Gunther won the match via submission, marking both Cena's first defeat by submission since No Way Out 2004 and the end of Cena's in-ring professional wrestling career.

Following the main event, the crowd applauded John Cena and cheered him with various chants such as "Thank You, Cena!" before several WWE officials, current and retired wrestlers, and referees came out and surrounded the ring, which included talents from Raw, Smackdown, and NXT. Some of the legends included The Undertaker, Shawn Michaels, Rob Van Dam, Michelle McCool, Eve Torres, Trish Stratus, Mark Henry, and Kurt Angle. Undisputed Champion Cody Rhodes and CM Punk (Raw's World Heavyweight Champion) then presented Cena with both of their championship belts for him to lift as a gesture to the crowd. WWE's Chief Content Officer Paul "Triple H" Levesque, who notably got a chorus of boos from the audience, then showed Cena a video package highlighting his career as a professional wrestler, with "I Lived" by American pop rock band OneRepublic playing in the background. After taking a few bows, Cena then removed his sneakers and armbands he used during the match and placed them in the center of the ring, before leaving to give one final salute on the stage as the event went off the air.

== Reception ==
After the main event, many fans booed and insulted WWE creative head Paul "Triple H" Levesque when he appeared in the ring, as well as during his interview on the post-show. Numerous taunts chanted by fans during the post-show included "you fucked up", "fuck you, Hunter", "we want Vince", and "AEW". Jason Powell of Pro Wrestling Dot Net stated that "the fans were obviously hoping for the feel-good ending" with John Cena beating Gunther, but instead "got Gunther retiring another wrestler". According to Sean Ross Sapp, the WWE locker room was divided about the ending of the match. Mixed martial arts journalist Ariel Helwani criticized Cena submission loss, stating that "John Cena deserved better." On the contrary, PWInsider's Mike Johnson praised the submission loss.

Brent Brookhouse of CBS Sports gave the main event a grade of A, stating that "Gunther is a man who can put on a good match with anyone, and Cena did the right thing by not only losing, but tapping out to give Gunther that feather in his cap. It's hard to have asked for much more from Cena in his final match". Wade Keller of Pro Wrestling Torch stated that the match had "the right finish", but said the crowd would have better suited Dominik Mysterio as Cena's final opponent. Roger Clark, best known for portraying Arthur Morgan in Red Dead Redemption 2, said of the match: "I know some of you disagree, but John Cena's last match was one of the most poetic things I've ever seen in the WWE. Time waits for no one but he controlled his goodbye." Dave Meltzer of the Wrestling Observer Newsletter rated the main event between Cena and Gunther 4.5 stars out of 5, the highest of the event. For the rest of the card, he gave the tag team match 3.5 stars, the Bayley–Sol Ruca bout 3.75 stars, and the opening contest 3.25 stars.

== Aftermath ==
A few days prior to the event on December 9, it was revealed that John Cena had signed a five-year extension to remain with WWE as a brand ambassador following his retirement from in-ring competition.

=== Raw ===
Gunther opened the subsequent episode of Raw, where he was met with torrid boos and several hostile chants. He proceeded to gloat about achieving his plan on making John Cena "give up" by tapping out "like a little bitch" and taunted the crowd before making his way backstage, where he was dismissed by Raw General Manager Adam Pearce.

== Results ==
No.	Results	Stipulations	Times
1	Cody Rhodes (SmackDown's Undisputed WWE Champion) vs. Oba Femi (NXT Champion) ended in a no contest	Champion vs. Champion match	9:10
2	Sol Ruca (with Zaria) defeated Bayley (with Lyra Valkyria) by pinfall	Singles match	9:25
3	AJ Styles and Dragon Lee defeated Je'Von Evans and Leon Slater by pinfall	Tag team match	6:30
4	Gunther defeated John Cena by submission	Singles match This was Cena's retirement match.	23:45

=== The Last Time Is Now tournament ===
The Last Time Is Now tournament was held to determine John Cena's opponent in Cena's retirement match at Saturday Night's Main Event XLII. The tournament began on the November 10 episode of Raw in Cena's hometown of Boston, Massachusetts, and concluded on the December 5 episode of SmackDown in Austin, Texas.

1st Round; Raw; November 10–17, 2025; SmackDown; November 14–21, 2025
Raw	Jey Uso	Pinfall
SmackDown	The Miz	10:11
SmackDown	Damian Priest	8:52
Raw	Rusev	Pinfall
Raw	Sheamus	Pinfall
SmackDown	Shinsuke Nakamura	10:54
Raw	LA Knight	Pinfall
TNA	Zack Ryder	8:32
Raw	Penta	Pinfall
Raw	Finn Bálor	10:11
TNA	Dolph Ziggler	8:50
SmackDown	Solo Sikoa	Pinfall
NXT	Je'Von Evans	15:00
Raw	Gunther	Submission
SmackDown	Carmelo Hayes	Countout
Raw	Bronson Reed	13:49

Quarterfinals; Raw; November 24, 2025; SmackDown; November 21, 2025 (Aired: November 28)
Raw	Jey Uso	Pinfall
Raw	Rusev	9:30
SmackDown	The Miz (Note: On November 21, WWE announced that quarterfinalist Sheamus suffered a shoulder injury and was no longer medically cleared to compete in the tournament. The Miz won a lottery to replace him.)	11:10
Raw	LA Knight	Pinfall
Raw	Penta	4:20
SmackDown	Solo Sikoa	RSC (Note: During their match, Penta injured his shoulder, resulting in Sikoa winning via referee stoppage.)
Raw	Gunther	Pinfall
SmackDown	Carmelo Hayes	17:40

Semifinals; Raw; December 1, 2025
Raw	Jey Uso	9:45
Raw	LA Knight	Pinfall
SmackDown	Solo Sikoa	19:00
Raw	Gunther	Pinfall

Final; SmackDown; December 5, 2025
Raw	LA Knight	17:54
Raw	Gunther	Submission
