= Run Norwich =

Road running event in Norwich, England

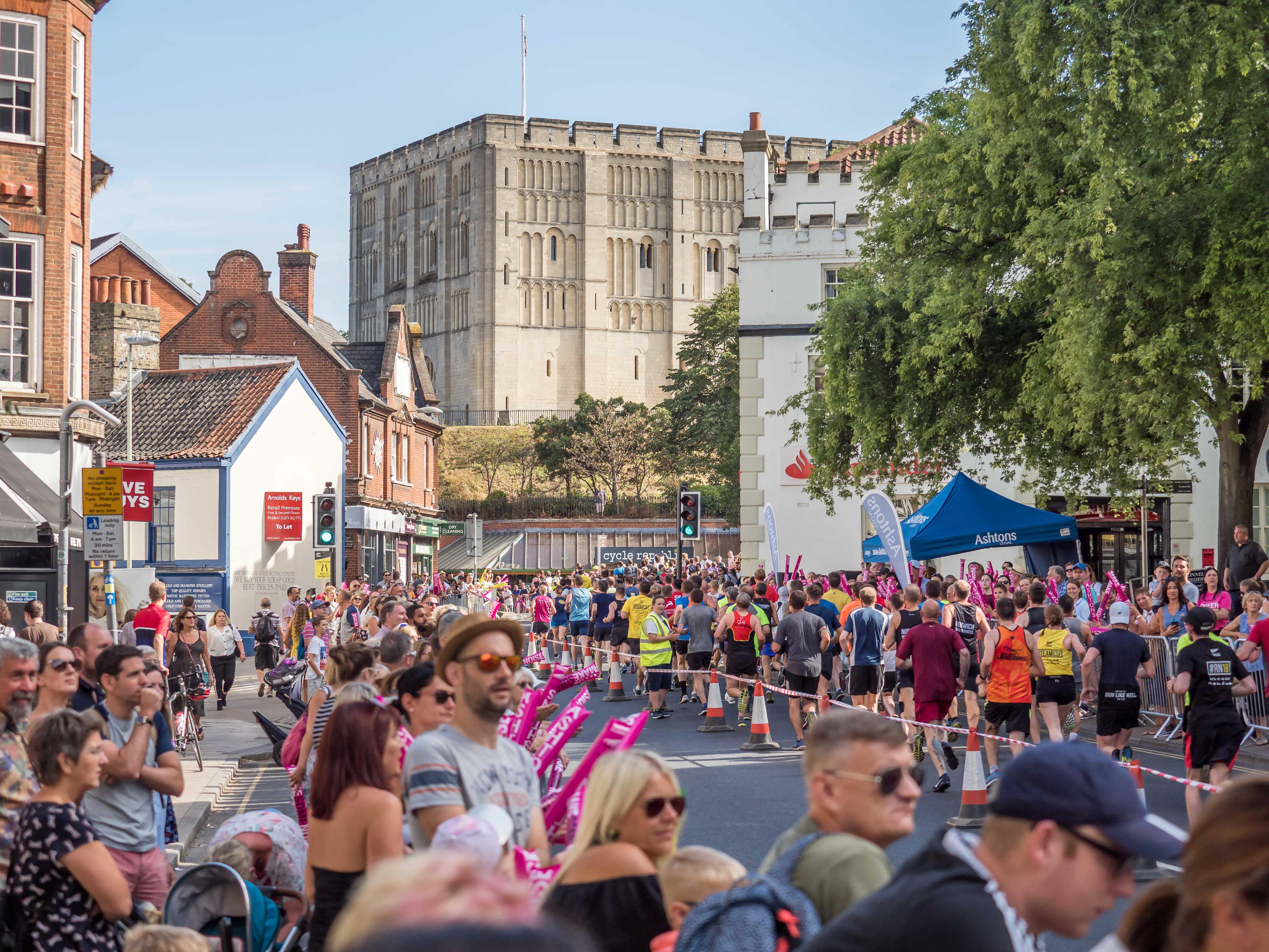
- Date: September (2024-), July (2019-2023); August (2015-2018)
- Location: Norwich
- Event type: Road
- Distance: 10 km
- Established: 2015; 11 years ago
- Course records: 29:59 (men); 33:26 (women)
- Website: runnorwich.co.uk

Run Norwich is an annual road running event over 10 kilometres (6.2 miles) held in Norwich, United Kingdom. Established in 2015 by Norwich City Community Sports Foundation, the race goes through Norwich's city centre, and passes landmarks such as Carrow Road, Norwich Cathedral, and Norwich Castle.

In 2019, over 6,200 participants started the race, with Logan Smith and Iona Lake of City of Norwich Athletics Club claiming victories in 31:41 and 36:23 respectively.

Following a three-year hiatus due to the COVID-19 pandemic in Europe, Run Norwich returned to the city on Sunday 23 October 2022, attracting over 6,200 participants.

2026's edition of the race, held on Sunday 6th September 2026, had 8,042 finishers, with two new race records set at the front by Jonathan Escalante-Phillips and Daisy Glover, respectively.

== Past winners ==
Edition	Year	Men's winner	Time (h:m:s)	Women's winner	Time (h:m:s)
1st	2015	(United Kingdom) Nick Earl	32:28	(United Kingdom) Tracy Barlow	35:46
2nd	2016	(United Kingdom) Nick Earl	32:23	(United Kingdom) Tracy Barlow	35:19
3rd	2017	(United Kingdom) Michael Kallenberg	31:12	(United Kingdom) Emma Risbey	37:21
4th	2018	(United Kingdom) Nick Earl	30:49	(United Kingdom) Danielle Nimmock	35:03
5th	2019	(United Kingdom) Logan Smith	31:41	(United Kingdom) Iona Lake	36:23
6th	2022	(United Kingdom) Logan Smith	31:22	(United Kingdom) Anya Culling	34:43
7th	2023	(United Kingdom) Logan Smith	31:30	(United Kingdom) Mabel Beckett	35:33
8th	2024	(United Kingdom) Jonathan Escalante-Phillips	30:41	(United Kingdom) Holly Archer	34:37
9th	2025	(United Kingdom) Marshall Smith	31:28	(United Kingdom) Holly Archer	35:34
10th	2026	(United Kingdom) Jonathan Escalante-Phillips	29:59	(United Kingdom) Daisy Glover	33:26
