= The Speed Project =

Unsanctioned running relay

- Location: United States
- Distance: 340 miles
- Established: 2013 (13 years ago)

The Speed Project (TSP) is an unsanctioned 340-mile running relay, which starts in Los Angeles and finishes in Las Vegas. It since has expanded to include events in Europe and South America.

== History ==
The race began in 2013, when Nils Arend and five friends - three other men and two women - ran the route as a relay. In 2020, race organisers started accepting solo entries. In November 2023, they held an event in the Atacama Desert, with the finish line at San Pedro de Atacama. In 2024, they started a European edition of the challenge, called The Speed Project CHX, where teams run from Chamonix to Marseille.

== Notable entrants ==
The event attracts professional athletes, with British runner Anya Culling taking part in 2024.
