= Iona Lake =

British steeplechaser

Personal information
- Born: 15 January 1993 (age 32) Norwich, Norfolk, England
- Height: 1.55 m (5 ft 1 in)
- Weight: 48 kg (106 lb)

Sport
- Country: England
- Club: City of Norwich Athletics Club
- Coached by: Pauline Ash

Iona Lake is a British middle-distance runner, specialising in the 3000 metres steeplechase. She competed at the 2018 Commonwealth Games on the Gold Coast for England. She also runs in the 800 metres, 1500 metres, 3000 metres and 5000 metres distances, but has never competed professionally in these disciplines.

Lake's 3000 m steeplechase personal best of 9:39.03, achieved in Zagreb, Croatia in 2017, places her as the seventh quickest British female steeplechaser of all time in the 3000 m discipline. This performance also allowed her to compete at the 2018 Commonwealth Games, coming six seconds inside the qualifying time.

== Race results ==
All information from the Power of 10 website (rankings and results).

Year	Competition	Venue	Position	Event	Notes
2015	England Athletics U20 / U23 Championships	Bedford, England	1st	3000 m s'chase	10:08.80
2015	European Athletics U23 Championships	Tallinn, Estonia	8th	3000 m s'chase	9:59.83
2017	Hanžeković Memorial	Zagreb, Croatia	8th	3000 m s'chase	9:39.03
2017	British Athletics Championships	Birmingham, England	1st	3000 m s'chase	9:57.53
2018	2018 Commonwealth Games	Gold Coast, Australia	8th	3000 m s'chase	9:58.92
2019	Armagh International Road Race	Armagh, Northern Ireland	12th	3 kilometre	9:28
2019	Run Norwich	Norwich, England	1st	10K	36.23

=== Personal bests ===
Event	Time	Date	Place
800 m	2:10.07	12 July 2014	Norwich
1500 m	4:21.30	4 April 2015	Berkeley
3000 m	9:22.61	30 July 2014	Watford
5000 m	16:15.93	23 April 2015	Philadelphia
3000 m steeplechase	9:39.03	29 August 2017	Zagreb
