= Survivor Series: WarGames (2025) =

WWE premium live event

- Promotional poster featuring The Vision (Bronson Reed, Bron Breakker, and Paul Heyman)
- Promotion: WWE
- Brand(s): Raw; SmackDown
- Date: November 29, 2025
- City: San Diego, California
- Venue: Petco Park
- Attendance: 46,016

WWE event chronology
← Previous; Saturday Night's Main Event XLI	Next → NXT Deadline

Survivor Series chronology
← Previous; 2024	Next → 2026

The 2025 Survivor Series: WarGames, also promoted as Survivor Series: WarGames San Diego, was a professional wrestling premium live event (PLE) produced by WWE, held for wrestlers from the promotion's main roster brands, Raw and SmackDown. It was the 39th annual Survivor Series, and the fourth annual branded as "WarGames", and it took place on Saturday, November 29, 2025, at Petco Park in San Diego, California. The event centered on the WarGames match, a type of roofless steel cage match that surrounds two rings placed side by side and is contested by teams of multiple wrestlers; the first team to score a pinfall or submission wins while escaping the cage is a forfeit.

This was the first Survivor Series to take place in an outdoor venue, the first to take place in a stadium, the first to be held in a Major League Baseball venue, and the second to be held in the U.S. state of California, after the 2018 event in Los Angeles. It featured the first WarGames match to take place inside a stadium since July 1988, which was held by the former World Championship Wrestling (WCW). This was also WWE's first PLE held in San Diego since One Night Stand in June 2008. The event featured John Cena's last appearance at both Survivor Series and on a PLE as an in-ring performer due to his retirement from professional wrestling at the end of 2025. The event was also the final Survivor Series and first and only WarGames appearance of Brock Lesnar as an in-ring performer due to his own retirement in August 2026.

Four matches were contested at the event, including two WarGames matches that each involved wrestlers from both brands. In the main event, which was a men's WarGames match, The Vision (Bron Breakker, Bronson Reed, and Logan Paul), Drew McIntyre, and Brock Lesnar defeated CM Punk, Cody Rhodes, The Usos (Jey Uso and Jimmy Uso), and Roman Reigns, while the opening bout was a women's WarGames match that saw AJ Lee, Alexa Bliss, Charlotte Flair, Iyo Sky, and Rhea Ripley defeat Becky Lynch, Lash Legend, Nia Jax, and The Kabuki Warriors (Asuka and Kairi Sane). In the other two matches contested on the card, Dominik Mysterio defeated John Cena to win Raw's WWE Intercontinental Championship and Stephanie Vaquer defeated Nikki Bella to retain Raw's Women's World Championship. The event also saw the return of Liv Morgan following her injury hiatus.

This was the first Survivor Series to broadcast on ESPN Unlimited in the United States. It was also the first on Netflix in most international markets following the WWE Network's merger under the service in January 2025 in those affected areas, and it would also be the last on the WWE Network in any country as the last few countries that were still on the service due to pre-existing contracts merged under Netflix on April 1, 2026. It was also WWE's final main roster PLE to air on Disney+ in the Philippines, as well as the final Survivor Series to air on Abema in Japan, before they too merged under Netflix on January 1 and October 1, 2026, respectively.

== Production ==
=== Background ===
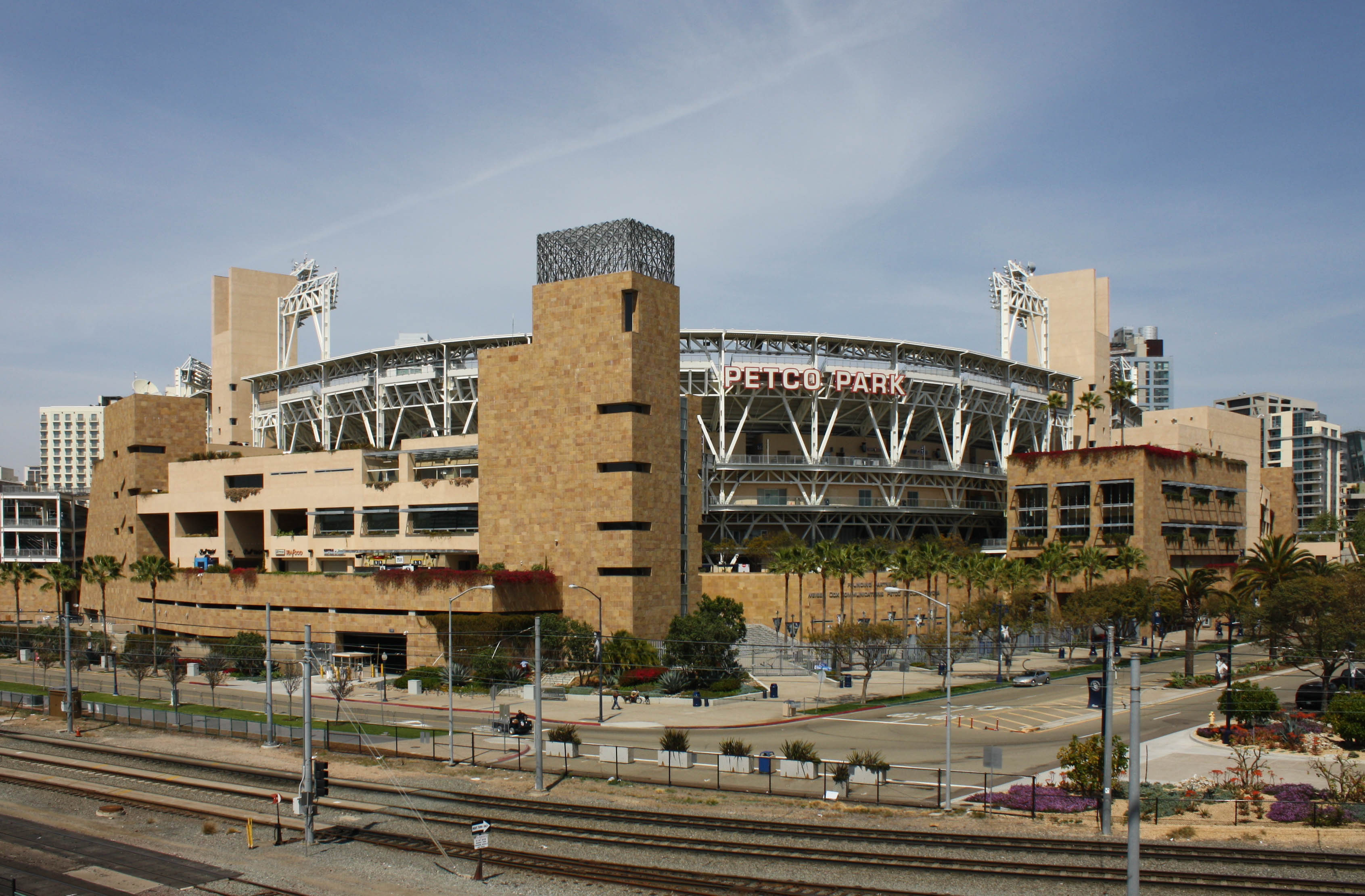
The 39th annual Survivor Series, and fourth as WarGames, was held at Petco Park in San Diego, California, marking the first Survivor Series to take place in an outdoor venue and a stadium.

Survivor Series is an annual professional wrestling premium live event (PLE), produced every November by WWE since 1987, generally held around Thanksgiving in the United States. It was originally broadcast exclusively via pay-per-view (PPV) before it began simulcasting on WWE's livestreaming platforms in 2014. In what has become the second longest-running PPV event in history (behind WWE's WrestleMania), it is one of the promotion's original four PPVs, along with WrestleMania, SummerSlam, and Royal Rumble, referred to as the "Big Four", and as of August 2021, it is considered one of the "Big Five", along with Money in the Bank.

From 1987 to 2021, the event was characterized by having Survivor Series matches, which were tag team elimination matches that typically featured teams of four or five wrestlers against each other. Since 2022, the event has been based around the WarGames match with the event rebranded as "Survivor Series: WarGames". The WarGames match is a type of roofless steel cage match that surrounds two rings placed side by side. It is contested by two or three teams composed of three to six members each. One member from each team starts in the cage, and every couple of minutes, another team member enters in a staggered format until all participants have entered. Once all participants are in the cage, the match officially begins and the first team to score a pinfall or submission wins, while escaping the cage is a forfeit.

Announced on April 21, 2025, the 39th Survivor Series was scheduled for Saturday, November 29, 2025, at Petco Park in San Diego, California. It was the first Survivor Series event to be held in an outdoor venue and the first to be held in a stadium, and it was held for wrestlers from the promotion's Raw and SmackDown brand divisions. This marked the second Survivor Series to be held in the U.S. state of California, after the 2018 event in Los Angeles. This was also WWE's first PLE to be held in San Diego since One Night Stand in June 2008. On June 30, it was revealed that it would again feature the WarGames matches for a fourth consecutive year, with the event promoted as Survivor Series: WarGames San Diego. While the 2025 card once again did not feature a traditional Survivor Series match, the preceding evening's episode of Friday Night SmackDown did.

=== Broadcast outlets ===
The PLE was broadcast on traditional PPV outlets worldwide. It was also available to livestream on ESPN Unlimited in the United States, SuperSport in Sub-Saharan Africa, Disney+ in the Philippines, Abema in Japan, Netflix in most other international markets, and the WWE Network in a select few countries that had not yet transferred to Netflix due to pre-existing contracts. This marked the first Survivor Series to livestream on Netflix following the WWE Network's merger under the service in January 2025 in those areas, and to livestream on ESPN's app in the United States, as WWE's contract with Peacock to air main roster PLEs expired at the conclusion of Clash in Paris in August.

=== Storylines ===
The event included four matches that resulted from scripted storylines. Results were predetermined by WWE's writers on the Raw and SmackDown brands, while storylines were produced on WWE's weekly television shows, Monday Night Raw and Friday Night SmackDown.

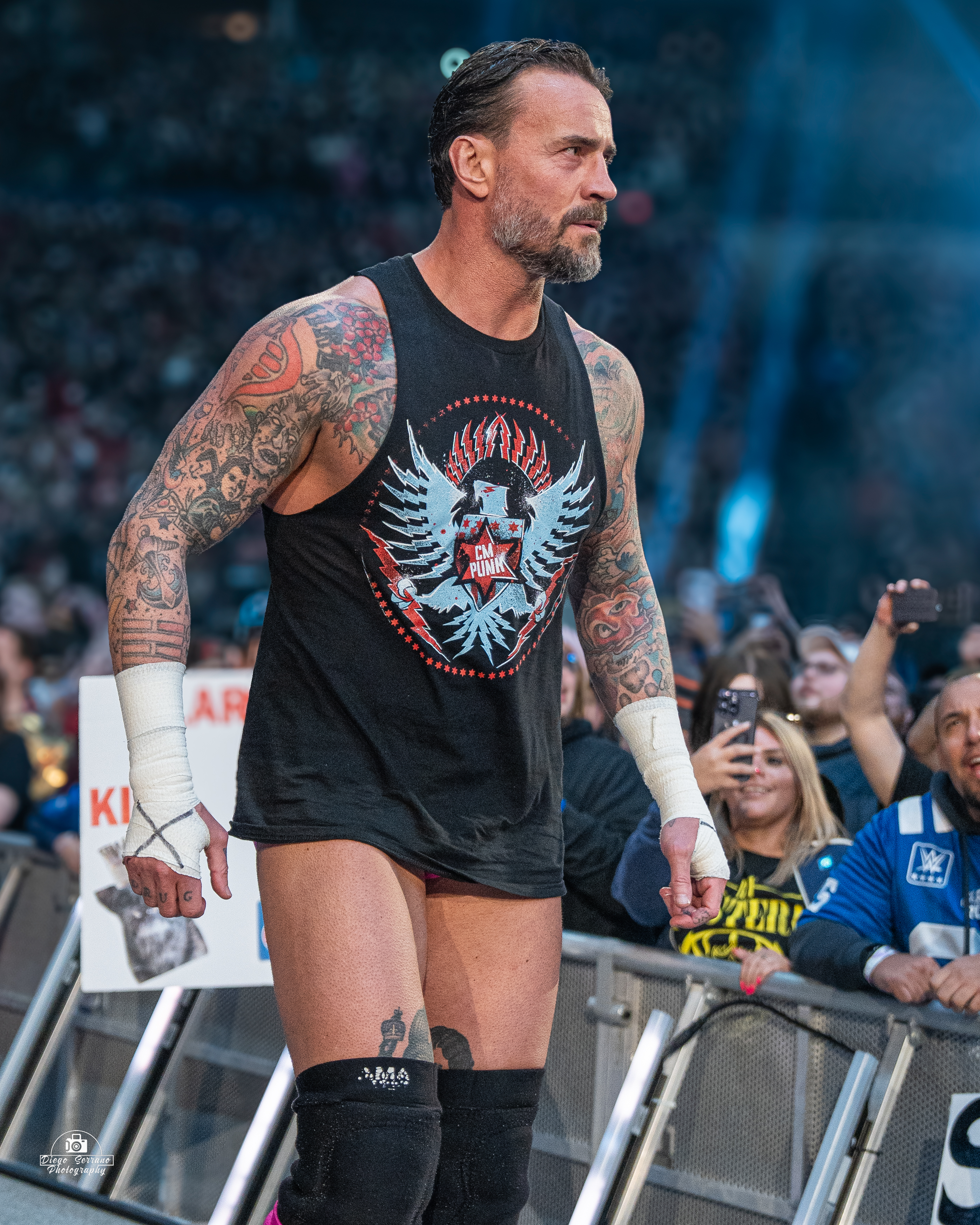
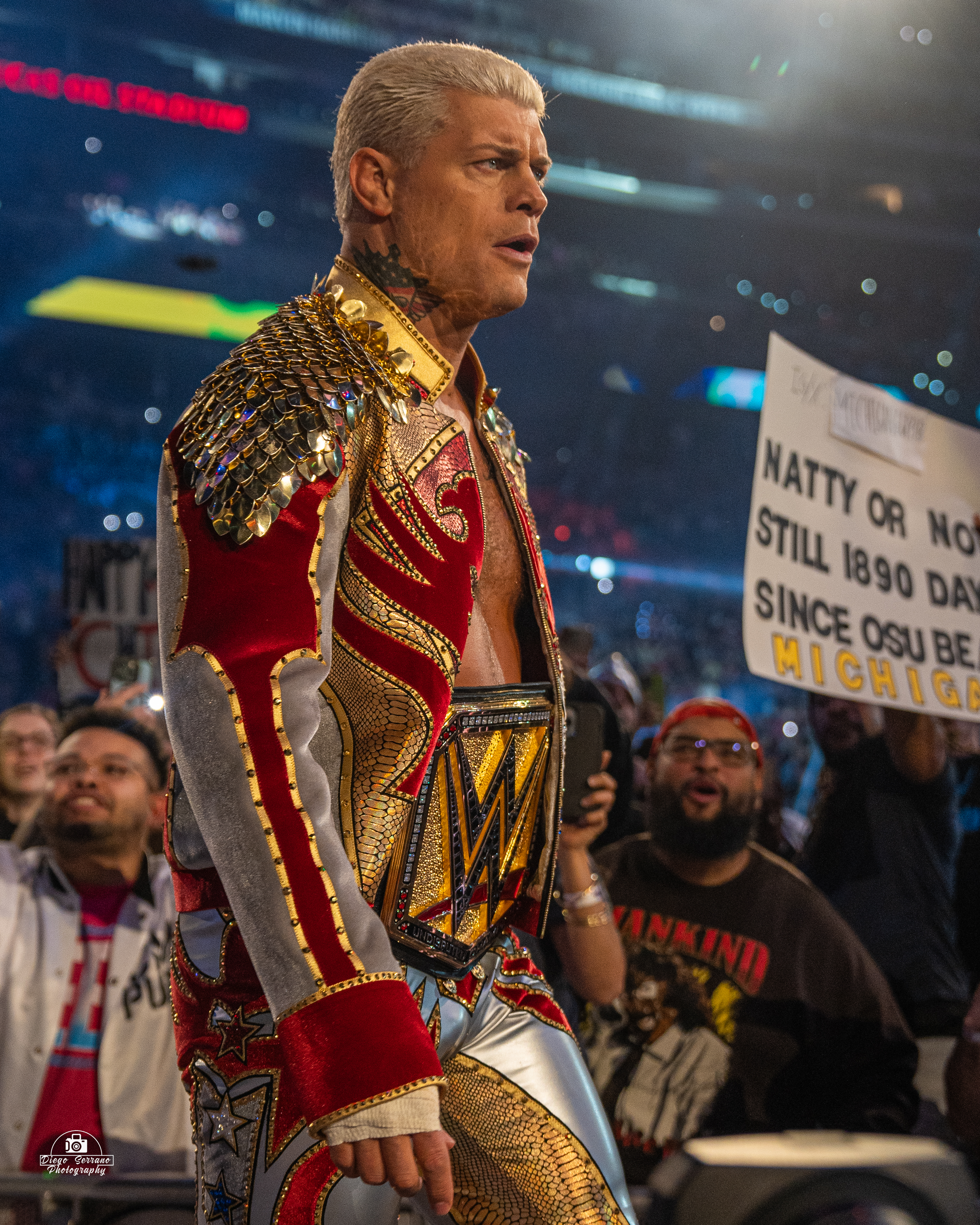
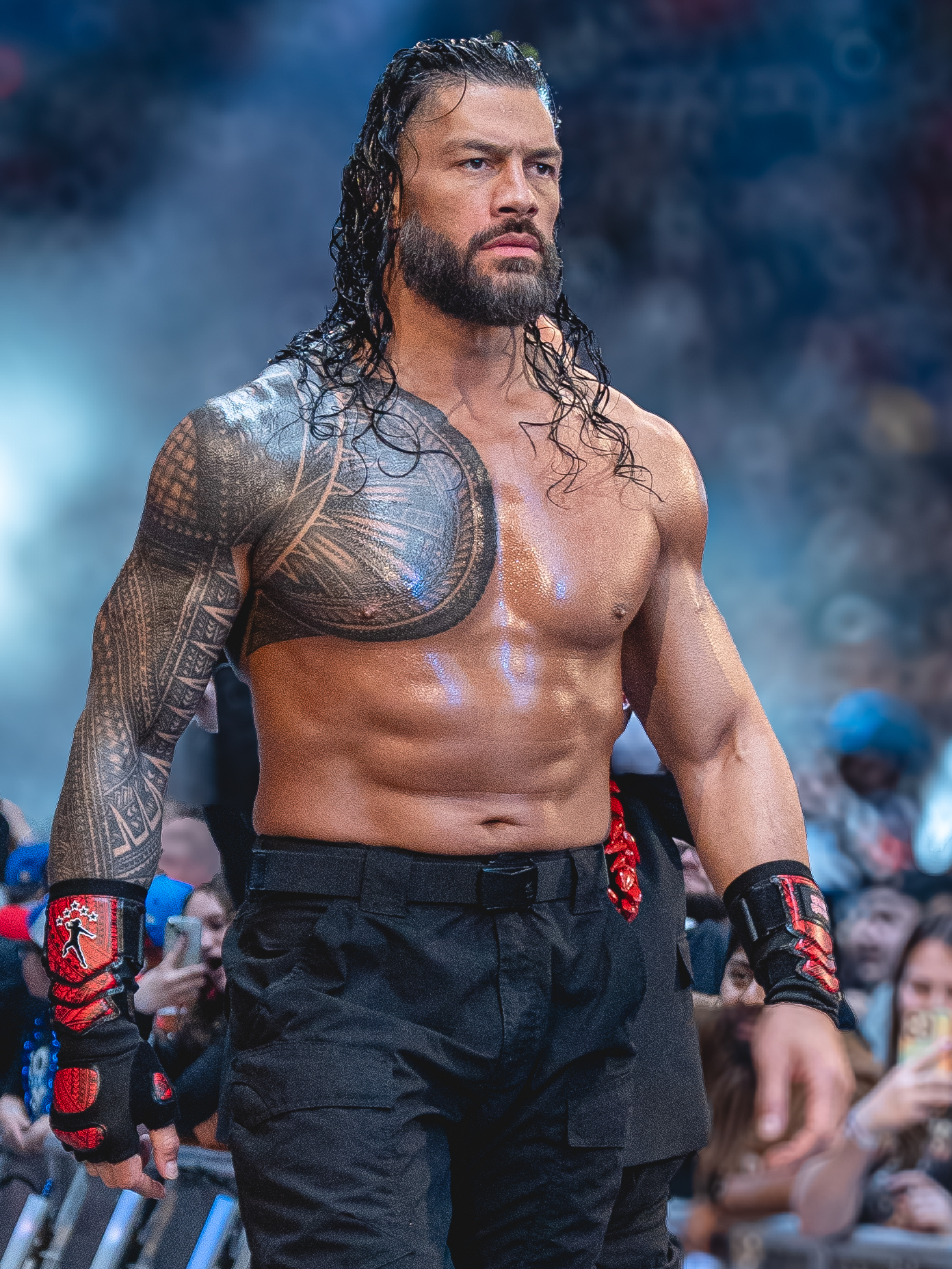
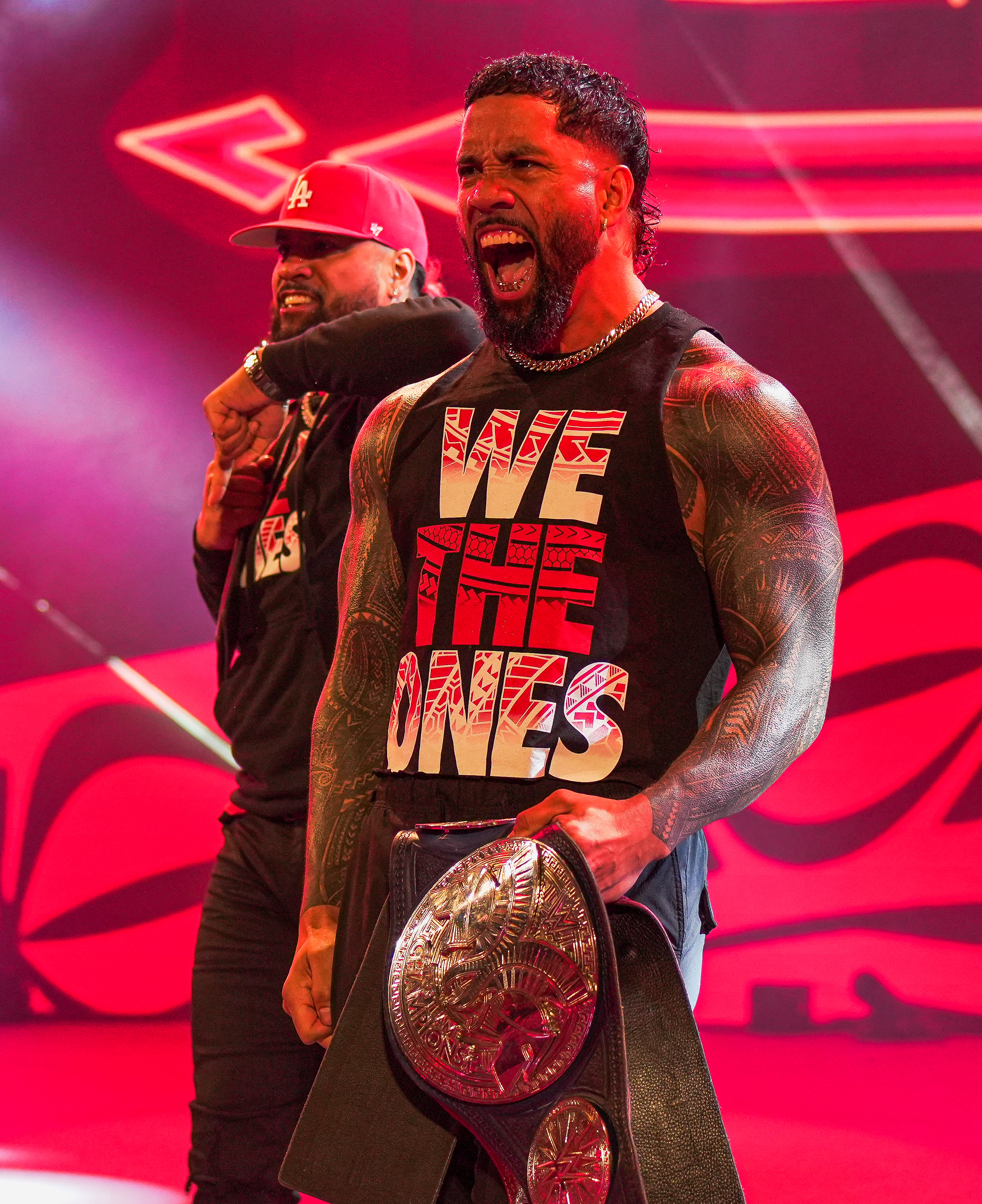
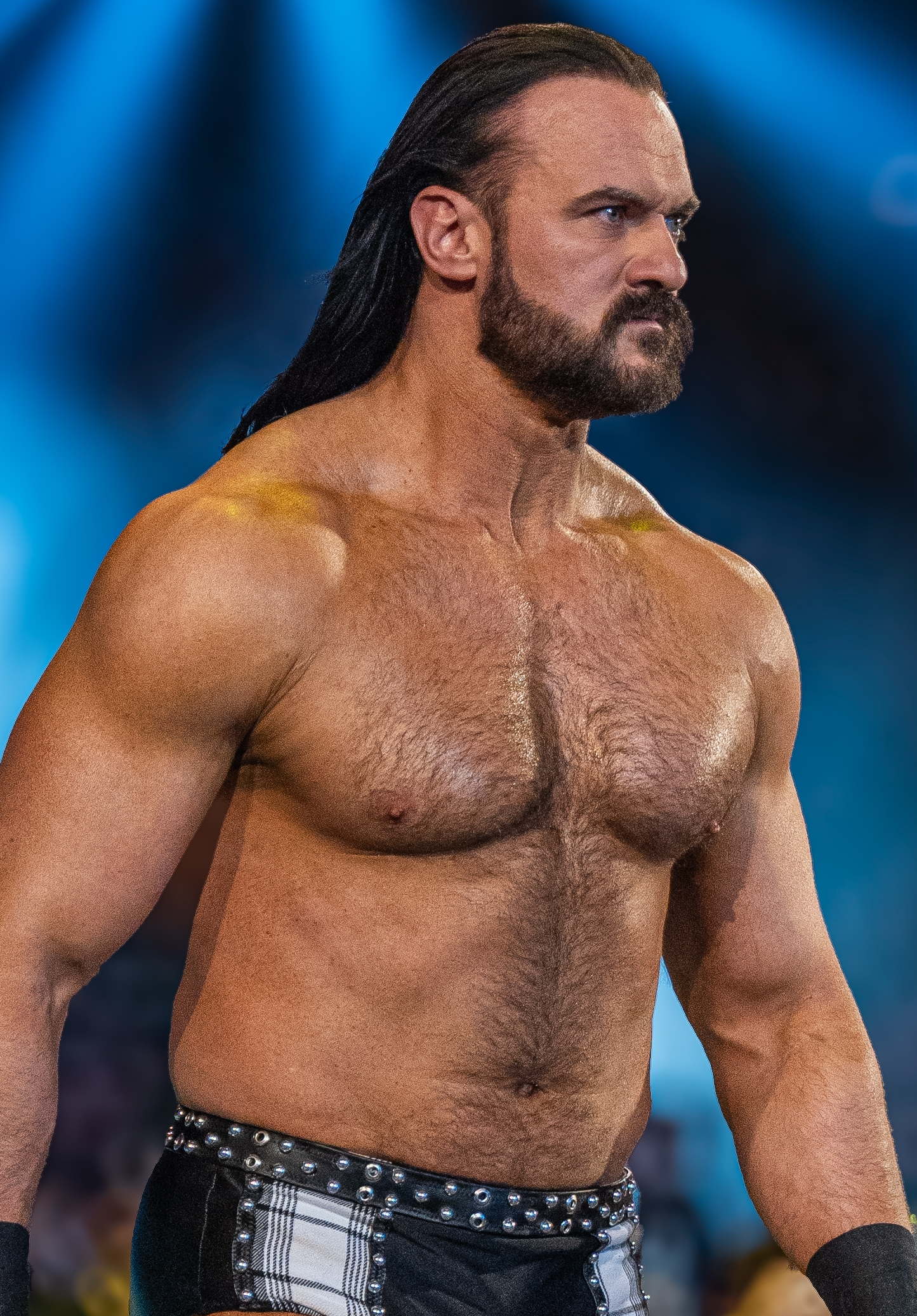
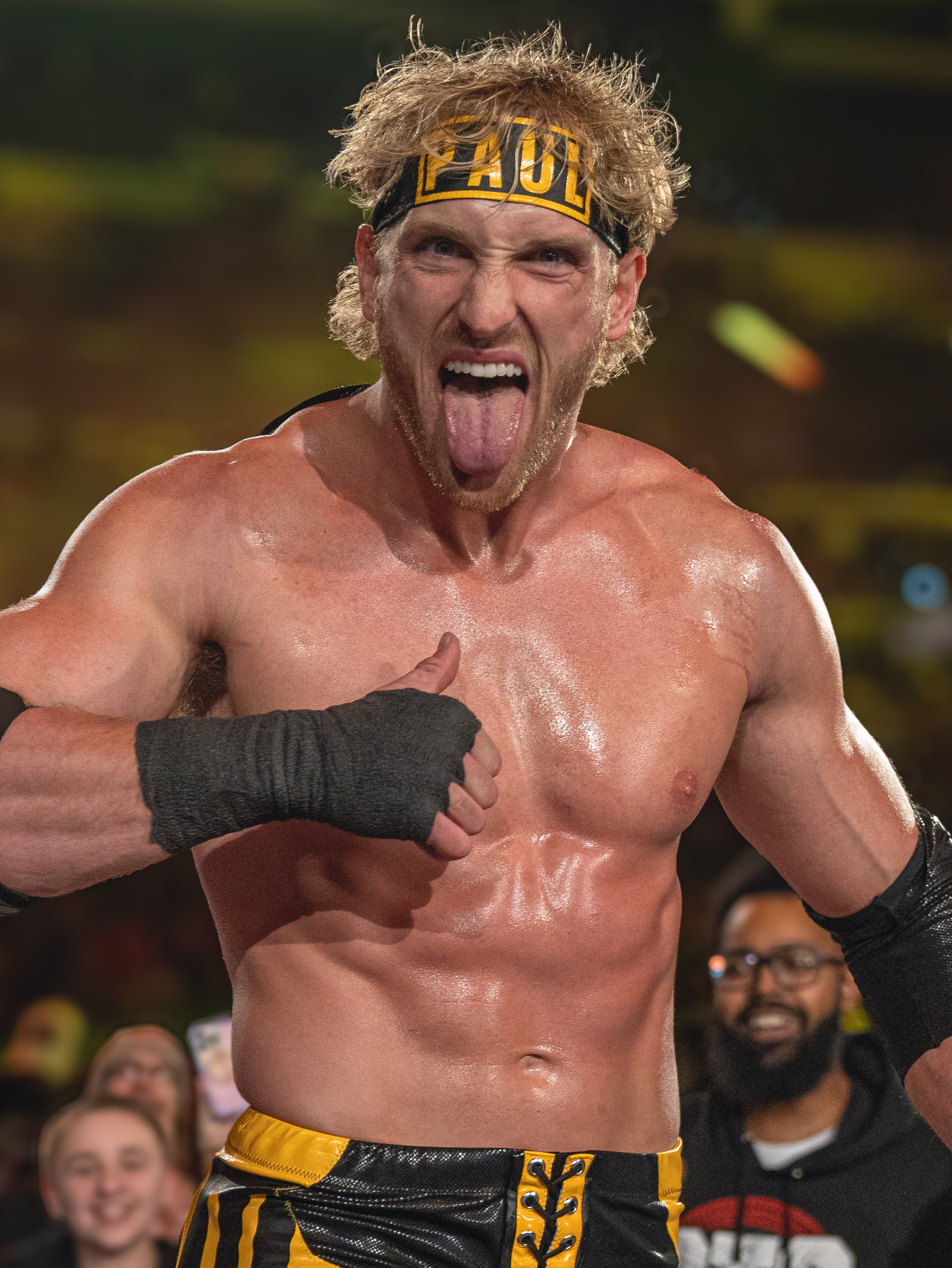
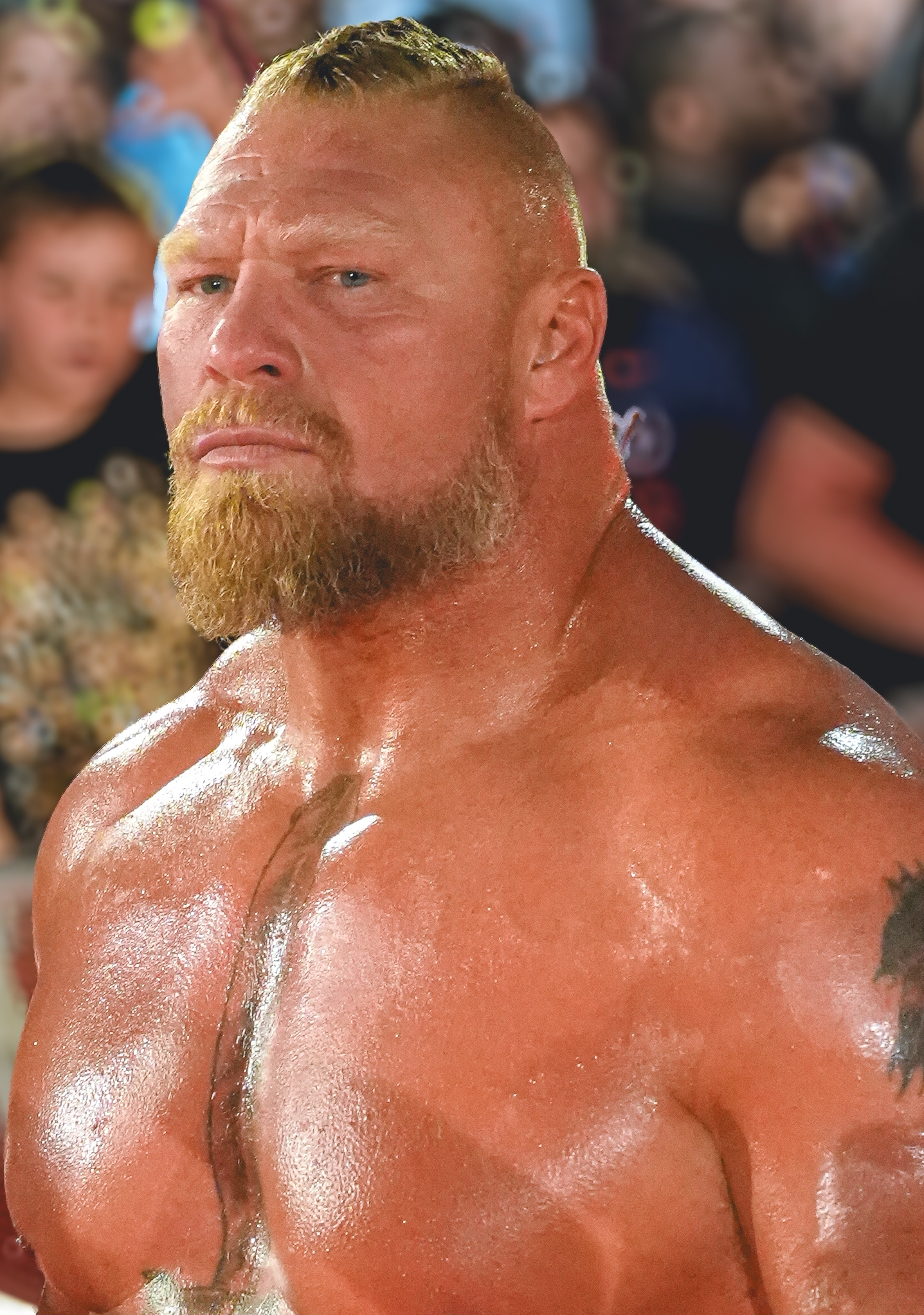
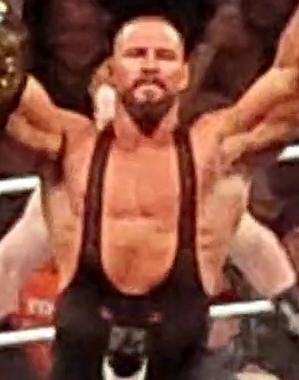
Raw's World Heavyweight Champion CM Punk, SmackDown's Undisputed WWE Champion Cody Rhodes, Roman Reigns, The Usos (Jey Uso and Jimmy Uso), Drew McIntyre, Logan Paul, Bron Breakker, Bronson Reed, and Brock Lesnar all participated in he men's WarGames match.

For most of 2025, CM Punk, Roman Reigns, and Jey Uso were involved in a rivalry against The Vision (Seth Rollins, Bron Breakker, Bronson Reed, and Paul Heyman). At Night 1 of SummerSlam, Reigns and Jey defeated Breakker and Reed in a tag team match, while Punk won Raw's World Heavyweight Championship, however, Rollins immediately cashed in his Money in the Bank contract on Punk to win the title. Also at Night 1 of SummerSlam, Drew McIntyre and Logan Paul, who formed an alliance a month before, won a tag team match. Both Jey and Punk subsequently failed to win the title from Rollins in a fatal four-way match at Clash in Paris, while at the same event, Reigns defeated Reed only to be attacked post-match by Reed and Breakker after Reigns applied the Guillotine choke to Heyman. At Wrestlepalooza, Jey teamed up with his twin brother Jimmy Uso to face Breakker and Reed in a tag team match, where Reed and Breakker won, Punk defeated Rollins in a mixed tag team match, and SmackDown's Undisputed WWE Champion Cody Rhodes defeated McIntyre to retain his title. At Crown Jewel, Reed defeated Reigns in an Australian Street Fight, after which, Rollins faced longtime rival Rhodes for the WWE Crown Jewel Championship, where Rollins won after he struck Rhodes with a Rolex watch. Two nights later on Raw, Breakker, Reed, and Heyman turned on Rollins, exiling him from the group. As a result of the attack, Rollins was forced to vacate the title, with Punk defeating Jey at Saturday Night's Main Event XLI to win the vacant title, while the same night, Rhodes retained the title once again against McIntyre. Two nights later on Raw during Punk's celebration, he was interrupted by Paul, who wanted a title shot. They were both interrupted by The Vision, with Heyman stating that The Vision were next in line for the title. This led to a brawl where The Vision stood tall against Paul and Punk. Later that same night, Jey and Punk faced The Vision in a tag team match, which ended in a double countout. After that, Paul appeared and attacked Punk with brass knuckles, joining The Vision. On the November 7 episode of SmackDown, McIntyre was suspended by SmackDown General Manager Nick Aldis after attacking Rhodes and a referee. On the November 10 episode of Raw, The Vision interrupted Punk and went to attack him. However, Jey and Rhodes joined Punk, leading to another brawl. After that, Punk challenged Heyman to find a team for a WarGames match against him, Rhodes, and Jey, which Raw General Manager Adam Pearce agreed. On that week's SmackDown, Jimmy announced that, after speaking with Punk, he would be the fourth member of Punk's team. Later that night, Reed faced Rhodes for the title, which ended in a disqualification win for Rhodes after Breakker and Paul interfered. The Usos (Jey and Jimmy) made the save, however, McIntyre appeared, attacking The Usos and Rhodes. It was subsequently revealed that McIntyre would be the fourth member of The Vision's team. On the following episode of Raw, both teams had a brawl until Punk was the only one standing in the ring. At that moment, Brock Lesnar, Heyman's former client, made his return and attacked Punk and Rhodes. Reigns also made his return and attacked longtime rival Lesnar. It was subsequently announced that Reigns would join Punk, Rhodes, and The Usos, while Lesnar would join The Vision and McIntyre. The following week on Raw, McIntyre and Paul defeated The Usos in a tag team match to earn the WarGames advantage.

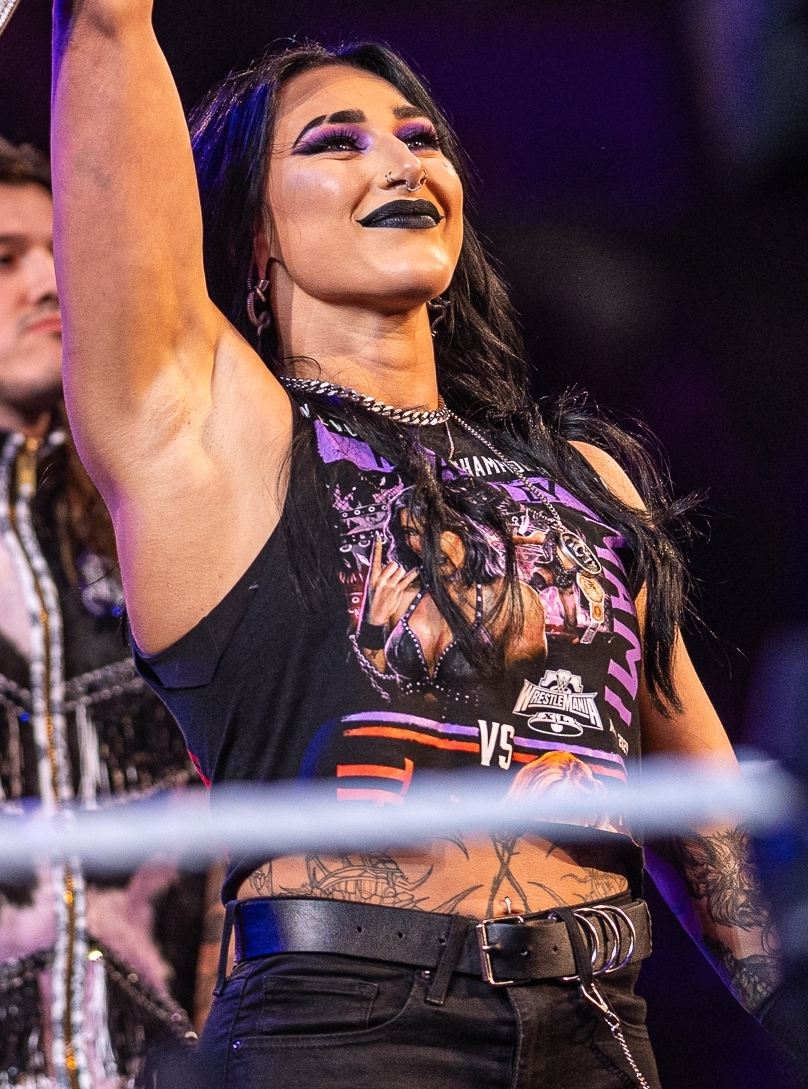
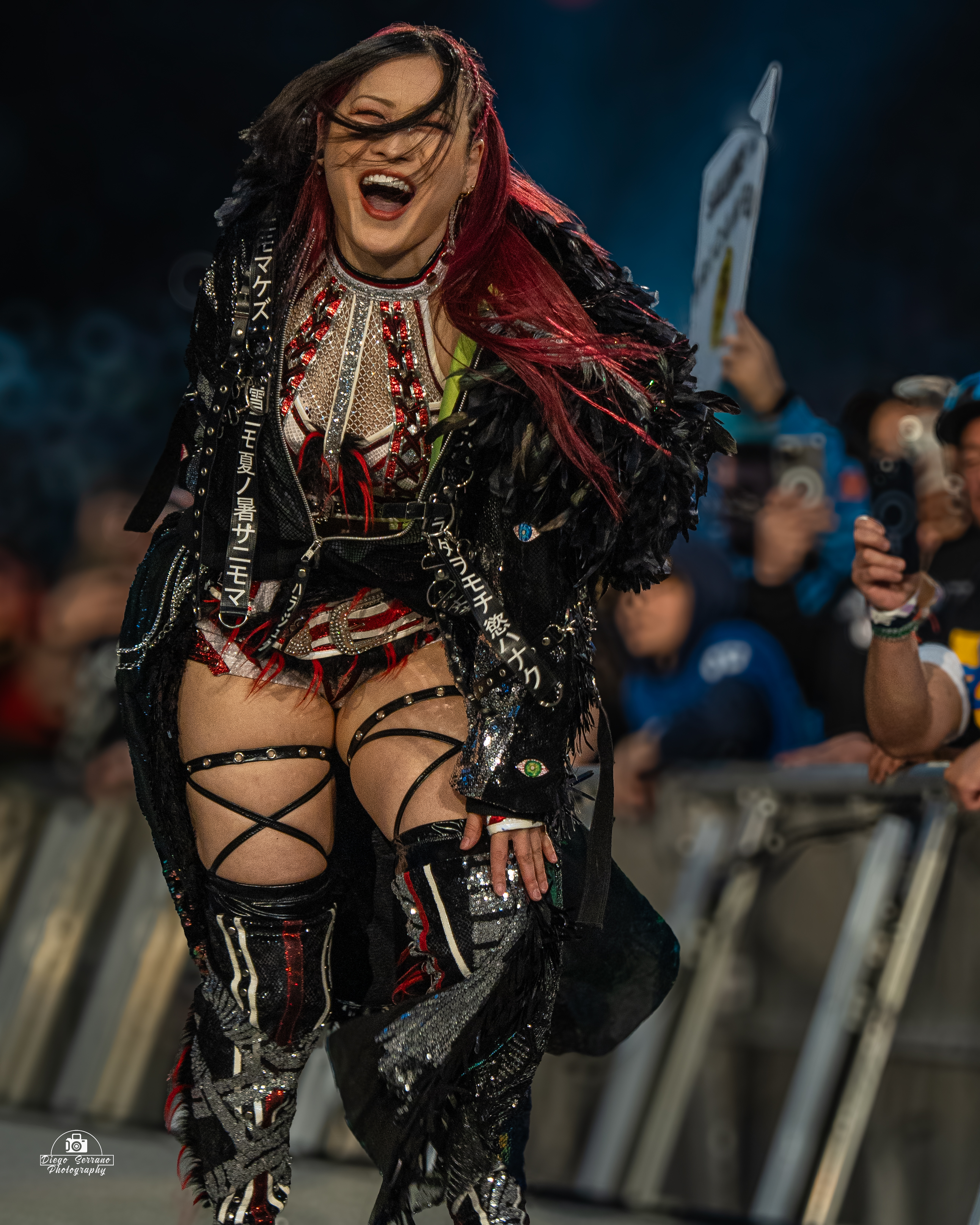
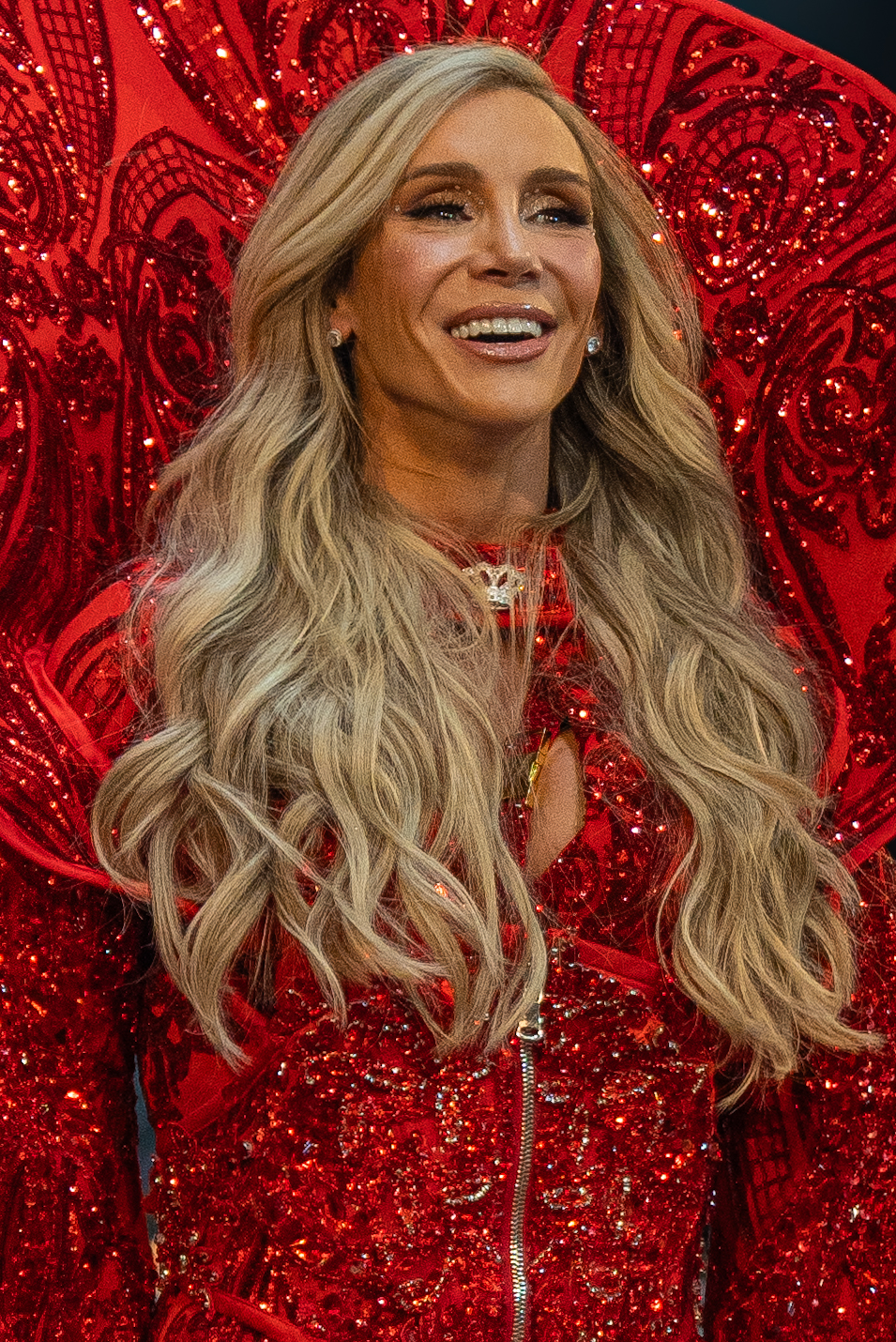
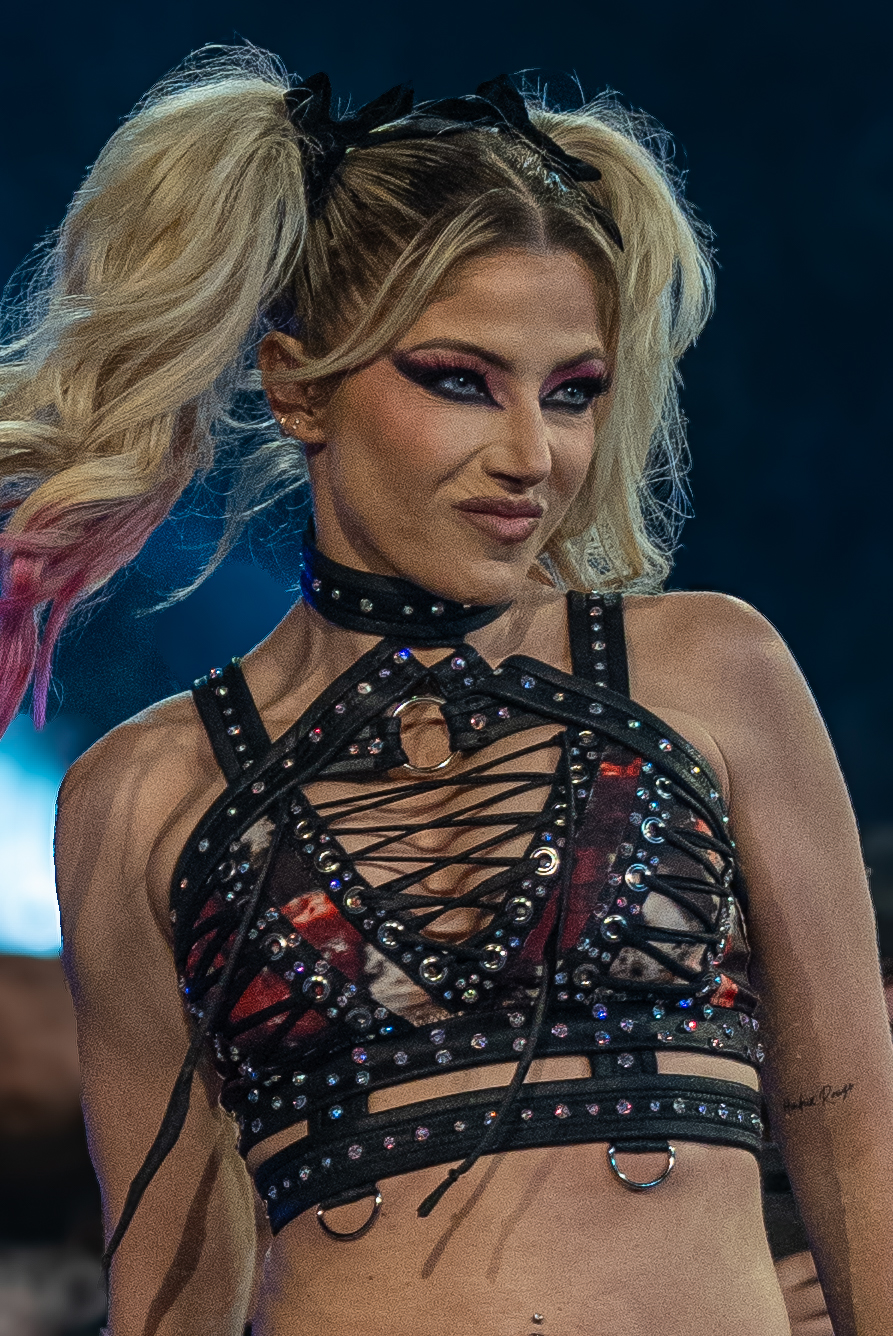
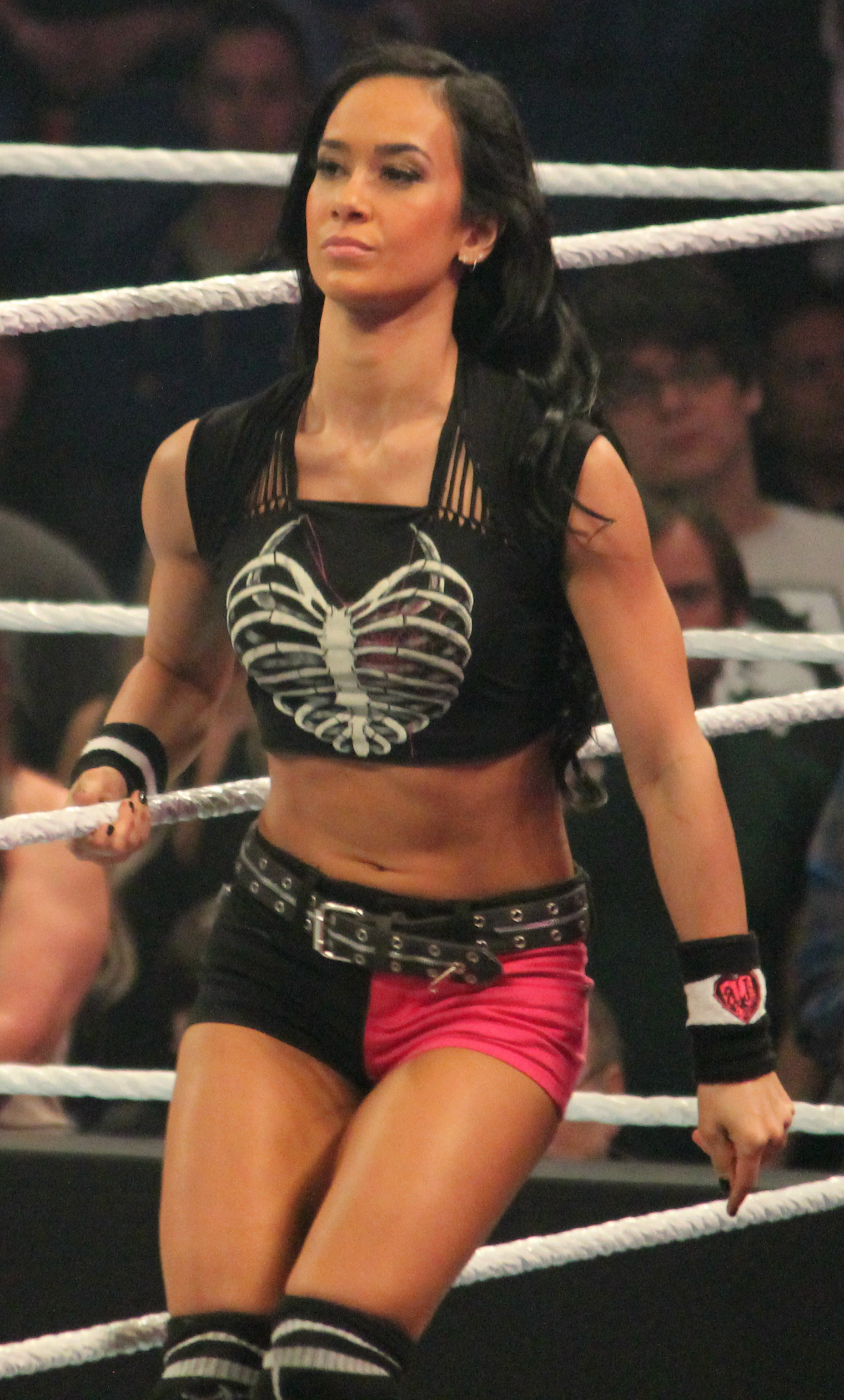
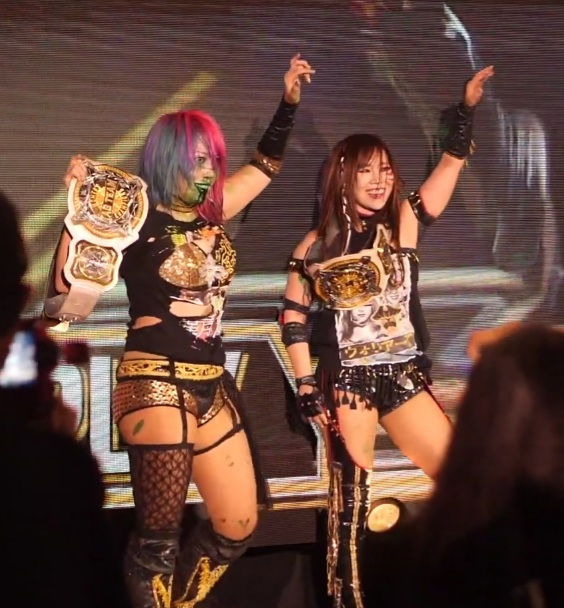
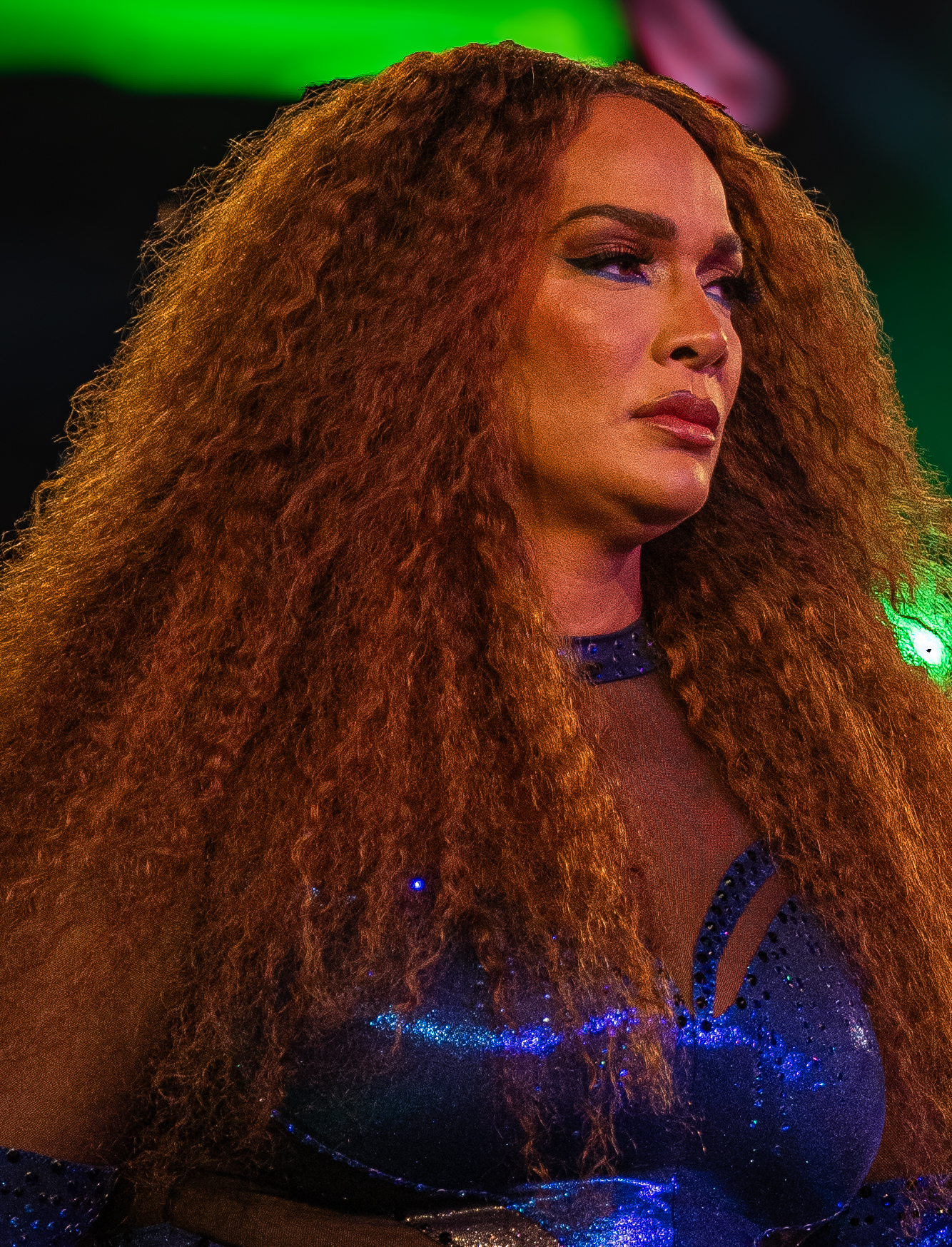
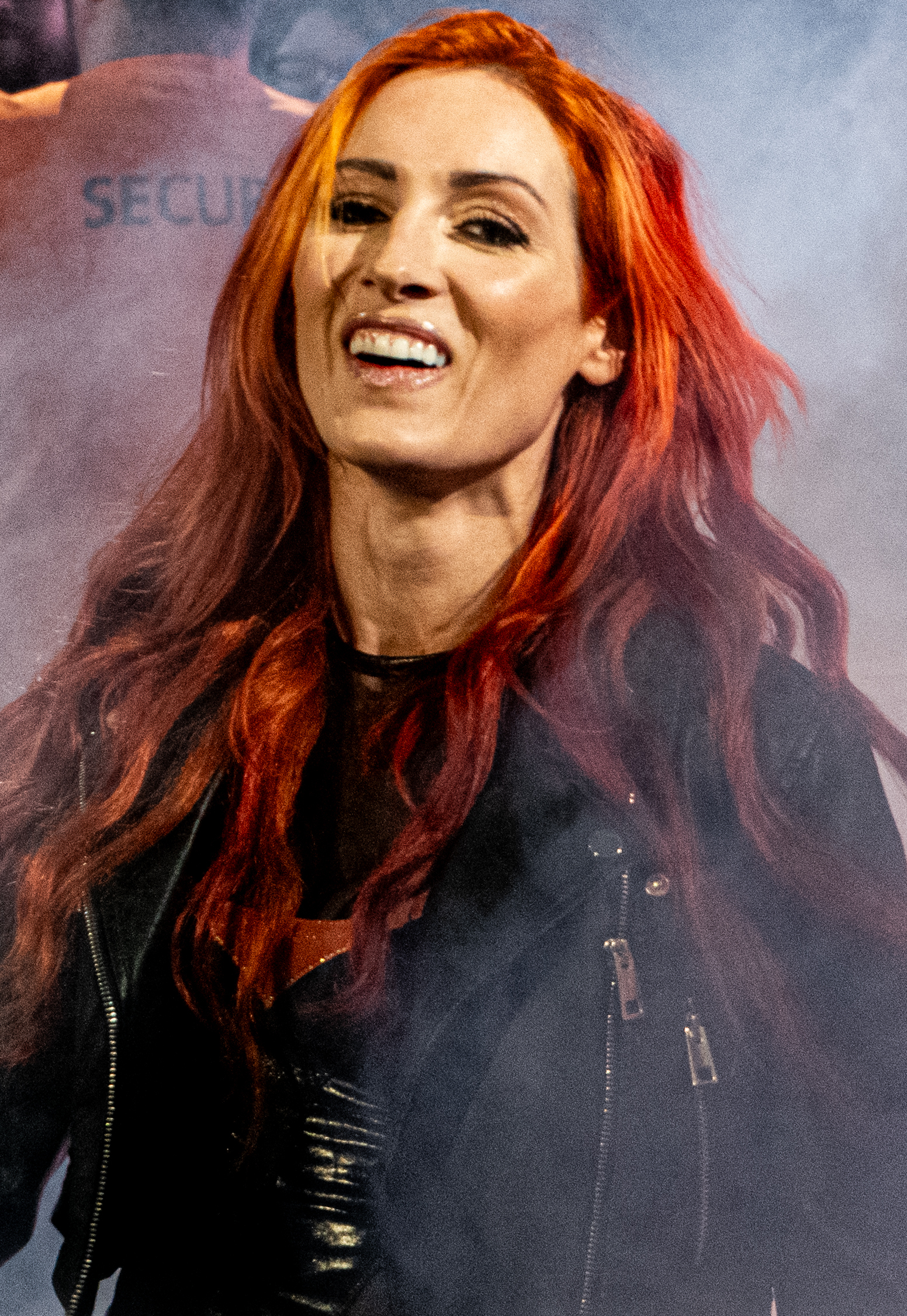
Rhea Ripley, Iyo Sky, Charlotte Flair, Alexa Bliss, AJ Lee, WWE Women's Tag Team Champion The Kabuki Warriors (Asuka and Kairi Sane), Nia Jax, and Becky Lynch all participated in the women's WarGames match.

On the September 5 episode of SmackDown, AJ Lee made her return to WWE for the first time since 2015, aiding her husband CM Punk against World Heavyweight Champion Seth Rollins and his wife, WWE Women's Intercontinental Champion Becky Lynch. Lee and Punk subsequently defeated Rollins and Lynch at Wrestlepalooza, with Lee submitting Lynch. Also during this time, Rhea Ripley was in a rivalry against The Kabuki Warriors (Asuka and Kairi Sane), more specifically with Asuka, who was jealous of Iyo Sky's friendship with Ripley. On the September 22 episode of Raw, after Ripley defeated Asuka, she and Sane attacked Ripley, prompting Sky to appear as she tried to stop them, however, The Kabuki Warriors turned on Sky. Ripley and Sky subsequently defeated The Kabuki Warriors in a tag team match at Crown Jewel, however, two nights later on Raw after Ripley defeated Sane, The Kabuki Warriors viciously attacked Ripley and Sky, taking them out of action indefinitely. After that, WWE Women's Tag Team Champions Alexa Bliss and Charlotte Flair began a rivalry with Nia Jax, while simultaneously having their own issues with The Kabuki Warriors after saving Bayley and Lyra Valkyria from a post-match attack on the November 3 episode of Raw. Bliss defeated Jax on the October 31 episode of SmackDown, however, Jax defeated Flair the following week after interference from NXT's Lash Legend. Jax subsequently explained that she called Legend because she considered her a formidable opponent after previously defeating Legend on an episode of NXT. Also that same night, Asuka and Sane appeared dressed as doctors, with Asuka spitting Green Mist on Bliss and Flair. Three nights later on Raw, The Kabuki Warriors defeated Bliss and Flair to win the title after interference from Jax and Legend. After that, the four women attacked Flair and Bliss, who were saved by the returning Sky and Ripley. After that, Ripley challenged The Kabuki Warriors, Legend, and Jax for a WarGames match, which was subsequently made official. However, on that week's SmackDown, Flair announced that she would not be in the match due to past issues with Ripley. Three days later on Raw, Lee made her return, distracting Lynch, costing her the WWE Women's Intercontinental Championship. On that week's SmackDown, Flair and Ripley decided to leave their problems aside, and later that night, Ripley announced Lee as their fifth team member. However, during a brawl between both teams, Lynch attacked Lee during her entrance. Lynch subsequently joined Kabuki Warriors, Legend, and Jax as their fifth team member. The following week on SmackDown, Flair defeated Asuka to earn the WarGames advantage.

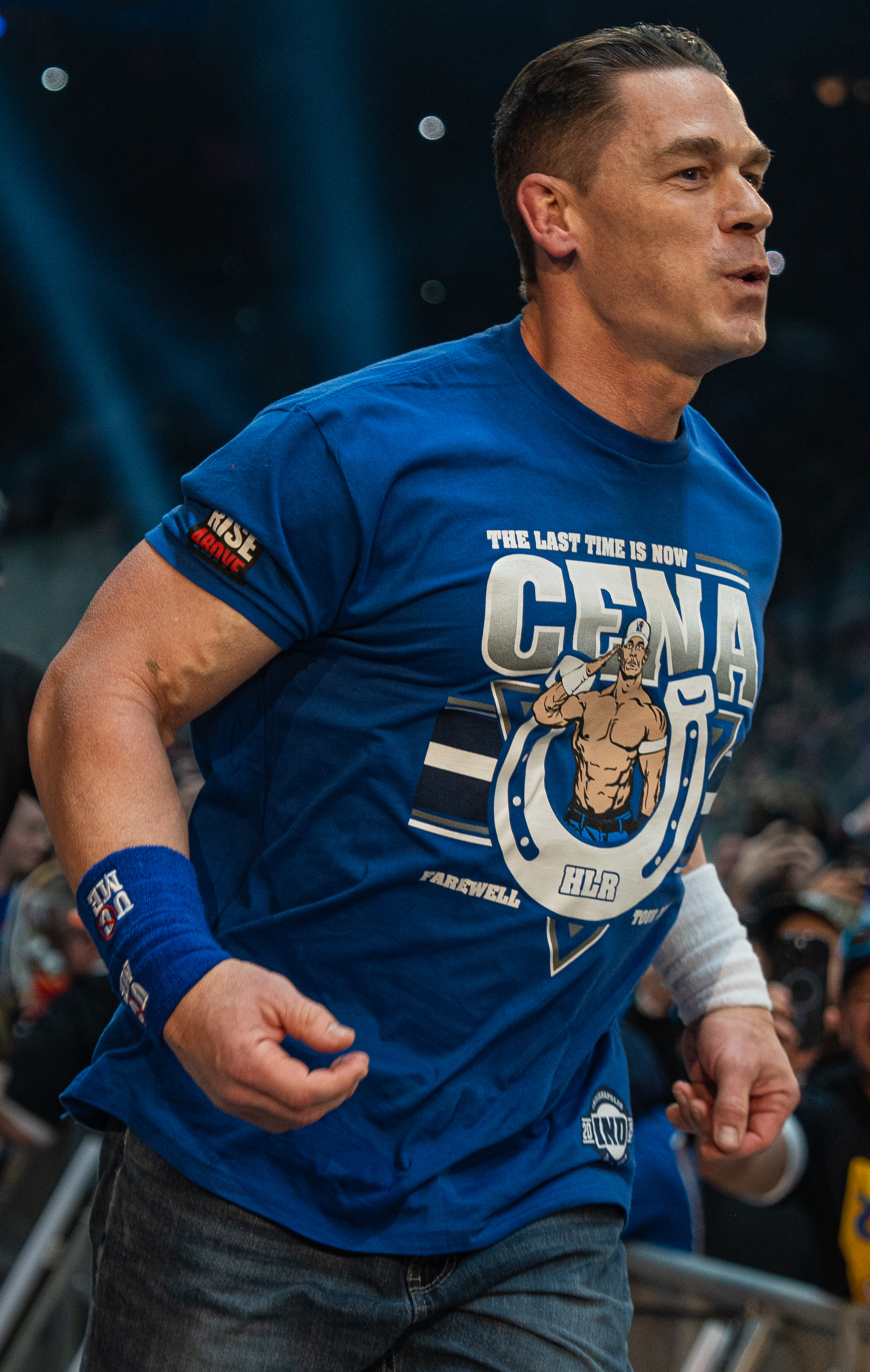
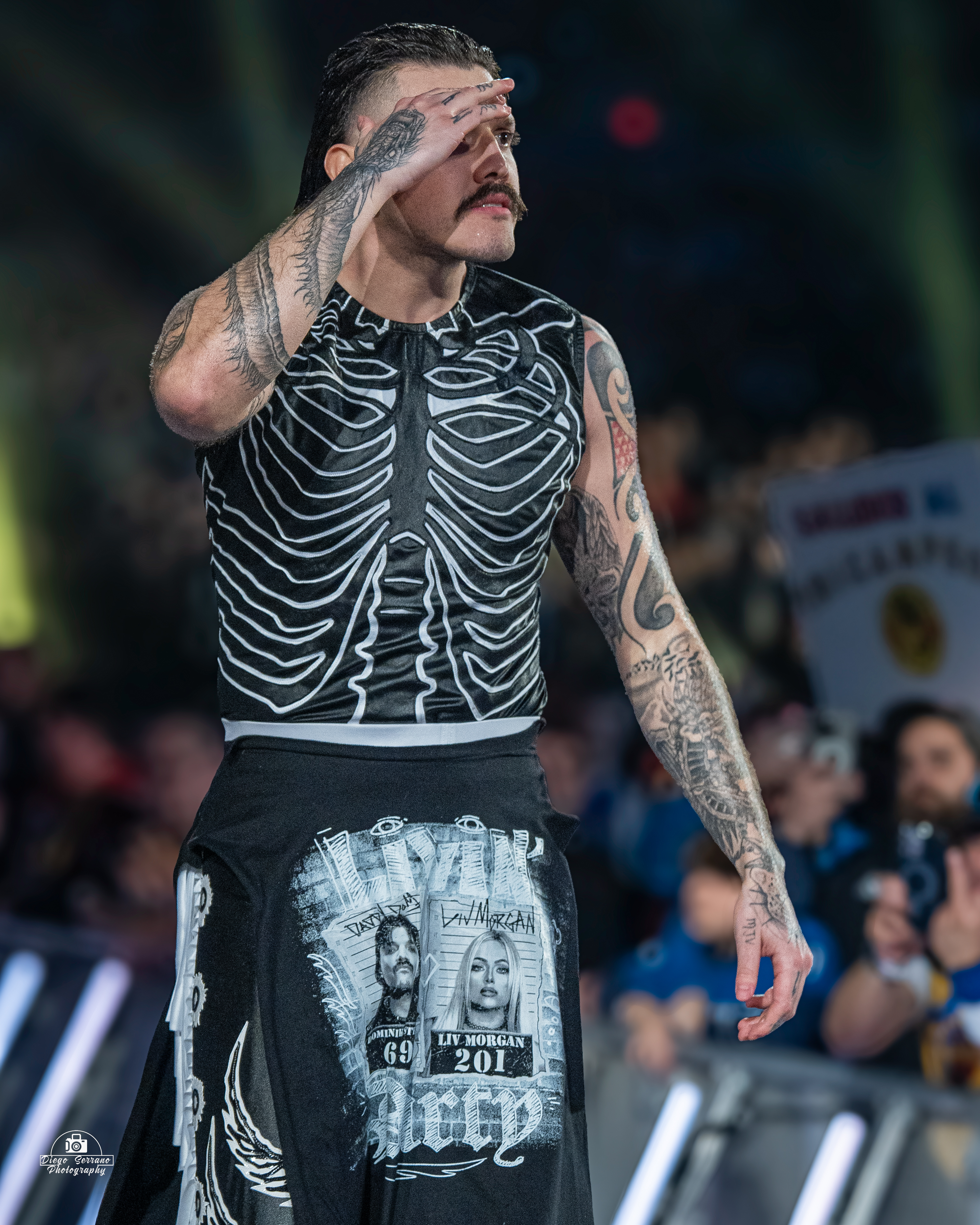
In his final match at a Survivor Series and on a premium live event, John Cena defended Raw's WWE Intercontinental Championship against Dominik Mysterio.

On the November 10 episode of Raw, WWE Chief Content Officer Paul "Triple H" Levesque introduced John Cena, who addressed his hometown of Boston until he was interrupted by WWE Intercontinental Champion Dominik Mysterio. This led to Triple H ordering him to defend the title against Cena, where Cena subsequently defeated Mysterio to win the title for the first time in his career. The following week, Mysterio interrupted Cena once again, and demanded a rematch for the title. Cena then proposed to defend it that night, but Mysterio declined. Mysterio said he wanted to face Cena in his hometown of San Diego at Survivor Series: WarGames, which Cena accepted.

In September, Women's World Champion Stephanie Vaquer and Nikki Bella formed an alliance. On the November 10 episode of Raw after Vaquer successfully defended her title, Bella attacked her with the title, turning heel for the first time since 2018. The following week, Bella attacked Vaquer during her entrance, and stated that she did not come back to be Vaquer's sidekick. Bella then demanded a title match against Vaquer, which was subsequently scheduled for Survivor Series: WarGames.

== Event ==
Other on-screen personnel
Role:	Name:
English commentators	Michael Cole
English commentators	Wade Barrett
Spanish commentators	Marcelo Rodriguez
Spanish commentators	Jerry Soto
Ring announcer	Alicia Taylor
Referees	Shawn Bennett
Referees	Jessika Carr
Referees	Daphanie LaShaunn
Referees	Eddie Orengo
Referees	Chad Patton
Referees	Charles Robinson
Referees	Ryan Tran
Referees	Rod Zapata
Interviewers	Cathy Kelley
Interviewers	Jackie Redmond
Pre-show panel	Joe Tessitore
Pre-show panel	Big E
Pre-show panel	Peter Rosenberg

=== Preliminary matches ===
The PLE opened with the Women's WarGames match between the team of Rhea Ripley, Iyo Sky, Alexa Bliss, Charlotte Flair, and AJ Lee and the team of The Kabuki Warriors (Asuka and Kairi Sane), Nia Jax, Lash Legend, and Becky Lynch. As shark cages were not used, each wrestler entered at different intervals. Flair and Asuka began the match. The next person to enter was Sky wielding a garbage can lid. Lynch entered next with a kendo stick and immediately attacked Sky. Bliss then entered next. Sane then entered the match, briefly taking control with a metal chain, followed by Lee, who scaled the cage to enter after Lynch closed the cage door to prevent Lee from entering. Jax entered and overpowered several wrestlers. Ripley entered next with a trash can and kendo sticks and cleared the ring. The last to enter was Legend, officially starting the match. Legend dominated various wrestlers. Legend performed a punt kick on Ripley for a nearfall. Lynch performed a Man Handle Slam on Lee, however, Sky performed a moonsault on Lynch to void the pin attempt. Ripley was surrounded by the opposing team and Flair saved Ripley by pushing Ripley aside which led to Asuka accidentally spraying mist onto Legend. Lee, with assurance from Ripley, handed Sky a trash can, who was perched atop the cage. Sky placed herself in the trash can and performed a senton from the top of the cage onto the other opposing team members, besides Lynch who was standing from afar and left alone. In the climax, Flair, Bliss, and Ripley performed their respective finishers on Lynch and Lee applied the Black Widow submission on Lynch, who tapped out, to win the match.

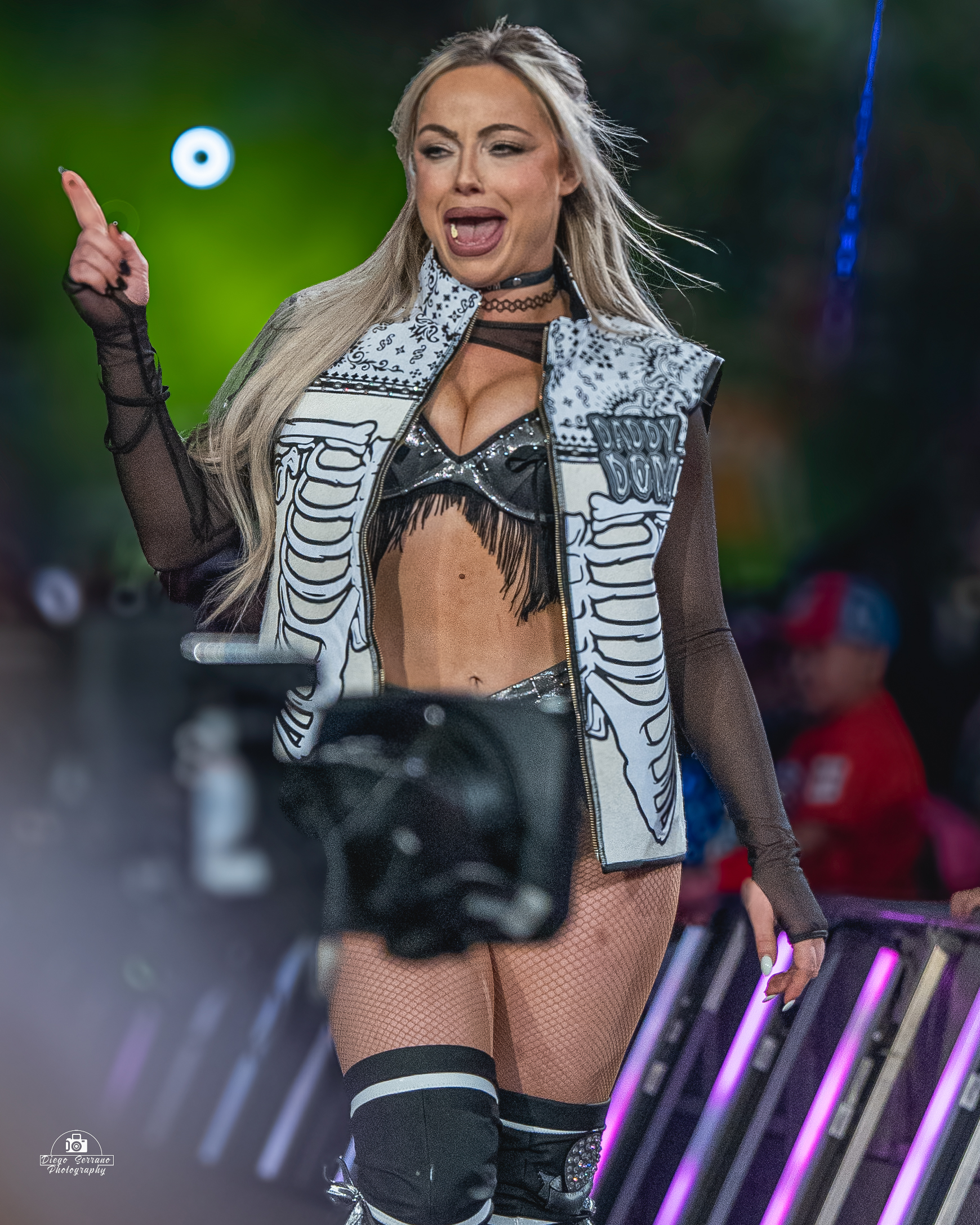
Liv Morgan returned from a five-month injury hiatus to assist Dominik Mysterio in regaining Raw's WWE Intercontinental Championship.

Next, John Cena (in his final match on pay-per-view) defended the WWE Intercontinental Championship against Dominik Mysterio (who was accompanied by Raquel Rodriguez and Roxanne Perez). During the match, Rodriguez and Perez attacked Cena thus giving Mysterio an advantage. Mysterio attempted a hurricanrana on Cena from the top of the ringside barricade seemingly injuring his shoulder. While the referee and medical personnel tended to Mysterio, Rodriguez delivered a Tejana Bomb and Perez executed Pop Rox on Cena. Mysterio then woke up and performed a frog splash on Cena, however, the referee eventually recognized the ruse and ejected Rodriguez and Perez from ringside. Cena performed a Five Knuckle Shuffle on Mysterio and applied the STFU on Mysterio, however, Mysterio reached the ropes to void the submission. Mysterio unzipped his boot which led to Cena unintentionally removing it from Mysterio's foot. Mysterio then performed 619s and frog splashes on Cena for a nearfall. Cena performed an Attitude Adjustment on Mysterio for a nearfall. As Cena attempted a shoulder tackle on Mysterio, Mysterio moved out of the way and Cena incapacitated the referee instead. This prompted Finn Bálor and JD McDonagh to come out and assist Mysterio, however, Cena neutralized both with a double Attitude Adjustment. In the climax, Mysterio then obtained the Intercontinental Championship belt and attempted to strike Cena with it, however, Cena countered into another Attitude Adjustment, however, the referee was still incapacitated to count the pin. Liv Morgan then returned from injury and slapped Mysterio, much to the surprise of Cena. Morgan surprisingly embraced Cena, performed a low blow on Cena, and struck Cena with the championship belt (similar to what Cena did to Cody Rhodes 8 months prior) which led to Mysterio performing another frog splash on Cena to win the title for a second time. Following the match, Cena received a standing ovation.

In the penultimate match, Stephanie Vaquer defended the Women's World Championship against Nikki Bella. Vaquer gained the early advantage after countering an attempted cheap shot at the opening bell. A missed knee drop on the apron allowed Bella to seize control, maintaining momentum until Vaquer countered an attempt at the Devil's Kiss with a back suplex. Bella responded with a Disaster Kick and the Rack Attack 2.0, but Vaquer reached the ropes to break the pinfall. Vaquer regained control by landing a knee drop on the apron and then executing the Devil's Kiss onto the reinforced announce table. She returned Bella to the ring, delivered a second Devil's Kiss, and secured the victory with a corkscrew splash to retain the championship.

=== Main event ===
The main event was the men's WarGames match which featured The Vision (Bron Breakker and Bronson Reed), Logan Paul, Drew McIntyre, and Brock Lesnar against CM Punk, Cody Rhodes, Roman Reigns, and The Usos (Jey Uso and Jimmy Uso). Punk and Breakker began the match. McIntyre entered next and Breakker and McIntyre began to target Punk, during which Punk was left bleeding after being scraped against the cage. Rhodes was next, however, McIntyre prevented Rhodes from entering the ring. Rhodes climbed the structure and attacked McIntyre. Punk had Breakker on his shoulders and Rhodes leapt off a corner turnbuckle and performed a Doomsday Device on Breakker, temporarily subduing Breakker. Rhodes and Punk teamed together and began to target McIntyre. Paul entered with two steel chairs, and attacked the opposing team with the steel chairs. Rhodes and Paul fought atop the structure only for Breakker to attack Rhodes with a steel chair. Jimmy entered next with a table. Reed then entered the match, and executed Tsunamis on Punk, Jimmy, and Rhodes. Jey entered next and delivered superkicks to various opponents and a 1-D with Jimmy to Paul. Lesnar entered with Paul Heyman and executed suplexes and F-5's on the other opponents. The last to enter was Reigns. Lesnar exited the structure and waited for Reigns at ringside. Reigns performed three superman punches on Lesnar. As Reigns attempted a fourth superman punch, Lesnar countered into an F-5 onto an announce table. Reigns and Lesnar then brawled at ringside and Lesnar eventually placed Reigns into the structure and the match officially began. In the end, a masked, unidentified wrestler appeared atop the cage and attacked Punk with a superkick and a curb stomp, which led to Breakker executing a Spear on Punk to win the match. Following the team, the winning team celebrated on the aisle as fireworks erupted. Back in the ring, Reigns assisted Punk to his feet and exchanged a fist bump with him, however, Reigns told Rhodes that they would not be teaming together again before walking away.

== Reception ==
Brandon LeClair of Pro Wrestling Torch called the women's WarGames match "mostly fine" although it was "exactly the kind of sterilized version of a once violent affair you'd expect from WWE", which was hard after "AEW's hyper-violent iteration of the same thing just a few weeks ago, rather than over the summer". LeClair assumed that the correct way to hold the match "lies somewhere in the middle of the two company's approaches, and unfortunately, there just isn't anyone doing that". The crowd noise escaping out of the stadium led "to a 40 minute match that didn't sound like it had a whole lot of heat from the live crowd", despite the pops for "Ripley's entrance and Sky's trash can spot", and concluded that the match "felt distinctly less memorable than previous years". For the Intercontinental Championship match, LeClair called it "fun, despite all of the wacky shenanigans and interference", and its was the expected match "from a Dominik Mysterio and late era Cena match". Judgment Day's interference "would've probably felt a little underwhelming had it been the action that cost Cena the Intercontinental title", but Liv Morgan's return "fit that bill much better, and gave a slightly better excuse for Cena's eventual demise". LeClair concluded that he was "glad these final few months of Cena's farewell tour have produced a lot of fun matches and one-offs, and that they were largely able to effectively course-correct from the disastrous heel run earlier in the year". The result of the Women's World Championship match "was never much in doubt" but LeClair was "intrigued" by how Nikki Bella and Stephanie Vaquer worked together. Although the match was "fine for a B-level title defense on the undercard of a major show", it "never really reached a third or fourth gear". For the men's WarGames match, LeClair stated that although "there were fleeting moments of this that worked", the match "just felt inconsequential, uneventful, and unremarkable", as it was "over thirty minutes of trading off beat downs – long advantages for the heels, long advantages for the babyfaces", and it "felt like very little actually happened". Although the "closing moments between Punk, Reigns, and Rhodes seemed to allude to bigger things ahead", LeClair wondered what it was with "Reigns and Rhodes teased dissension for no viable reason", having "barely interacted in the match at all". He concluded that most of the match felt "disjointed". LeClair considered the event "one of the weakest PLEs of the year for WWE", and assumed it would be best if WWE "would be best served shelving this concept for a year or so, or only bringing it back the next time it feels like a logical end to a major feud between two warring factions".

Brent Brookhouse of CBS Sports stated that although the event "didn't shake the foundations of WWE, it did leave fans scratching their heads in ways both positive and negative". He graded the women's WarGames match B-, calling it not great "with some timing issues and the pre-match stretch feeling like a slog" and resents "removing the shark cages in favor of doing 'entrances.'", calling it not terrible but "forgettable". Brookhouse also graded the Intercontinental Championship match B-, calling it "overbooked to an unnecessary degree", although "the right man won". The Women's World Championship match was graded C+, with Brookhouse calling it "a waste of Vaquer's time", with Nikki Bella "well past her best days, and her best days weren't at the level of talent in a modern locker room". Although it wasn't a bad match, it was "not one worth anyone's time". The men's WarGames match was graded B, with Brookhouse stating that "the interference at the end was entirely unnecessary and kind of ruins the idea of WarGames, but WWE rarely cares about the purity of match types". He concluded that it "was a fun match until a terrible finish", and called the overall event "a fairly disappointing night of wrestling".

Wrestling Observer Newsletter journalist Dave Meltzer rated the women's and men's WarGames matches 2.75 stars and 4.25 stars respectively, the Intercontinental Championship bout 3.25 stars, and the Women's World Championship match 1.25 stars.

== Aftermath ==
=== Raw ===
Iyo Sky and Rhea Ripley opened the following episode of Raw to talk about their team's win and began focusing on winning the WWE Women's Tag Team Championship from The Kabuki Warriors (Asuka and Kairi Sane). They were interrupted by previous champions Charlotte Flair and Alexa Bliss, who wanted their rematch for the title. This led to a match between the two teams for the main event which ended in a no-contest after interference from The Kabuki Warriors. The team of Bayley and Lyra Valkyria and The Judgment Day (Raquel Rodriguez, Roxanne Perez, and Liv Morgan) joined the fight with The Judgment Day standing tall in the end. A title match between the two teams was eventually scheduled for the WWE Raw on Netflix Anniversary Show on January 5, 2026.

Also on Raw, Dominik Mysterio gloated about his Intercontinental Championship win and how it made him the greatest Mysterio, luchador, and Intercontinental Champion of all time. He thanked The Judgment Day for helping him win when Liv Morgan interrupted, stating that she returned when she heard the group was falling apart. Morgan stated that as of now, The Judgment Day runs Raw.

Paul Heyman stated that it was a pleasure to work with Brock Lesnar and Drew McIntyre before praising Bronson Reed and Logan Paul. Heyman announced that Breakker would challenge CM Punk for the World Heavyweight Championship on the Raw on Netflix Anniversary Show on January 5, 2026. Breakker claimed that he was disappointed with how easy it was for him to pin Punk. Breakker touted Punk's past successes and promised to win the title from him. Two weeks later on the December 15 episode of Raw, the identity of the masked man who aided The Vision in the men's WarGames match was revealed to be Austin Theory, who officially joined the stable on December 29.

Stephanie Vaquer's Women's World Championship defense on the December 15 episode of Raw ended in a no-contest after interference by Nikki Bella. The two were then involved in a triple threat match for the title on the December 29 episode, where Vaquer retained.

=== SmackDown ===
Drew McIntyre opened the following SmackDown, stating that his suspension should be lifted since his team won the men's WarGames match and Bron Breakker got a World Heavyweight Championship match. SmackDown General Manager Nick Aldis ordered McIntyre back to his car, where he got attacked by Undisputed WWE Champion Cody Rhodes. He told Aldis to reinstate McIntyre. Following more weeks of feuding, a Three Stages of Hell match between Rhodes and McIntyre for the Undisputed WWE Championship was scheduled for the January 9, 2026, episode.

Also on SmackDown, Alexa Bliss (with Charlotte Flair) defeated Kairi Sane (with Asuka). After the match, Nia Jax and Lash Legend attacked Bliss, Flair, Sane, and Asuka.

=== Broadcasting changes ===
In continuing WWE's near worldwide transition to Netflix, this would be WWE's final main roster PLE to air on Disney+ in the Philippines, as well as the final Survivor Series to air on Abema in Japan, before moving to Netflix on January 1 and October 1, 2026, respectively. Throughout 2025, many of the select few countries that were still on the WWE Network due to pre-existing contracts gradually merged to Netflix with nearly all international markets on Netflix by January 1, 2026. The last few remaining countries that were still on the WWE Network merged under Netflix on April 1, 2026, making this 2025 event the last Survivor Series to air on the WWE Network in any country.

== Results ==
No.	Results	Stipulations	Times
1	AJ Lee, Alexa Bliss, Charlotte Flair, Iyo Sky, and Rhea Ripley defeated Becky Lynch, Lash Legend, Nia Jax and The Kabuki Warriors (Asuka and Kairi Sane) by submission	Women's WarGames match	41:10
2	Dominik Mysterio (with Raquel Rodriguez and Roxanne Perez) defeated John Cena (c) by pinfall	Singles match for the WWE Intercontinental Championship	16:40
3	Stephanie Vaquer (c) defeated Nikki Bella by pinfall	Singles match for the Women's World Championship	12:20
4	The Vision (Bron Breakker and Bronson Reed), Logan Paul, Drew McIntyre, and Brock Lesnar (with Paul Heyman) defeated CM Punk, Cody Rhodes, The Usos (Jey Uso and Jimmy Uso), and Roman Reigns by pinfall	Men's WarGames match	40:30
(c) / – the champion(s) heading into the match
