= Anya Culling =

British runner

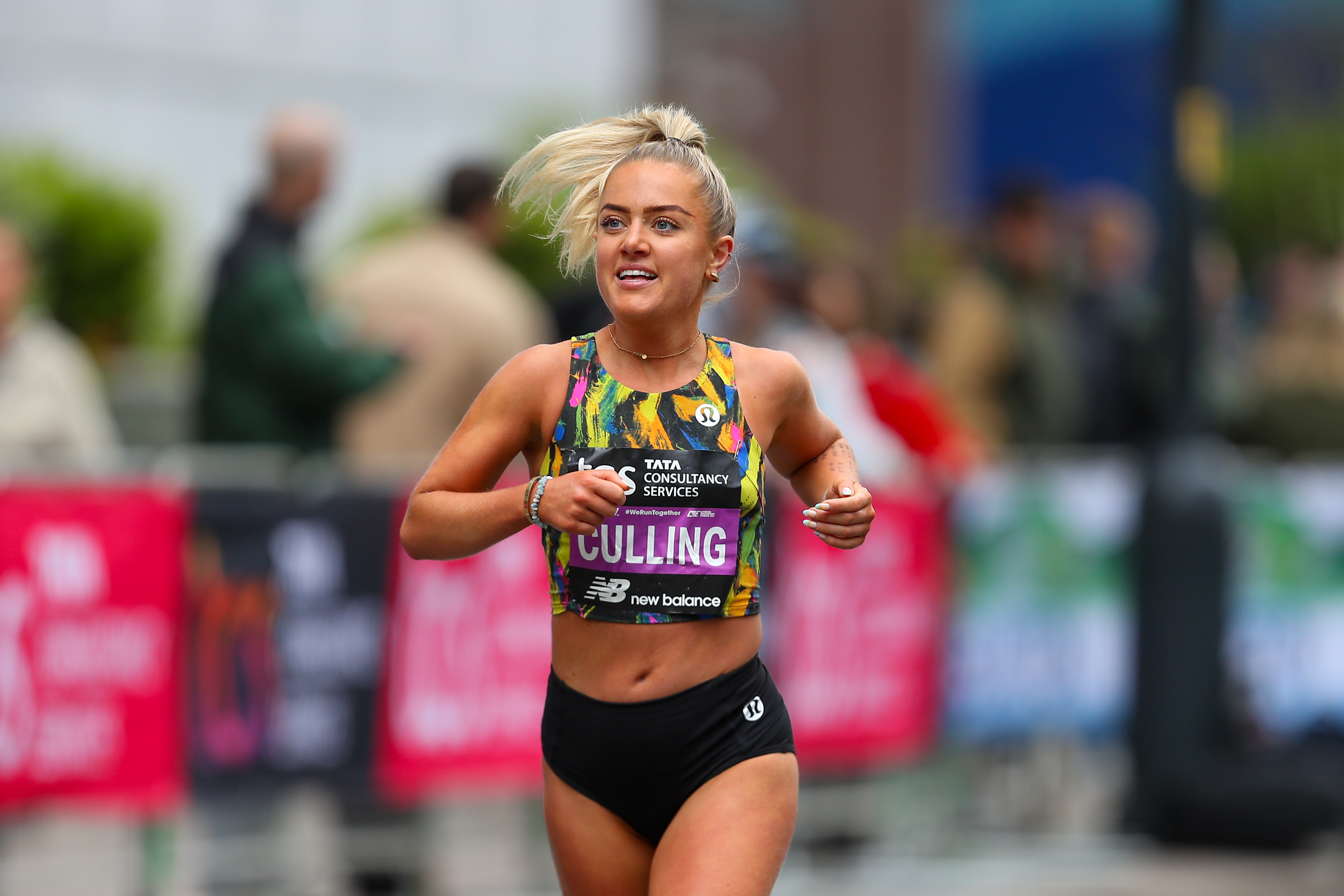

Personal information
- Born: 24 November 1998 (age 27) Norfolk, England
- Website: https://bonvivantac.co.uk/pages/about-me

Sport
- Events: Marathon, half marathon

Anya Culling (born 24 November 1998) is an English marathon runner. She has represented England at the Copenhagen Marathon and competed in the elite category at the London Marathon.

== Biography ==
Culling was born on 24 November 1998. She played hockey and cricket at county level whilst at school.

Culling is a marathon runner who has represented England at the Copenhagen Marathon and competed in the elite category at the London Marathon. She has also set a course record in the Run Norwich 10km.

Before competing in marathons, Culling had benign tumour removed and underwent radiotherapy to treat an over-active thyroid. She began running in 2018. She has been noted for what Marie Claire magazine called her "spectacular career transformation" from first time amateur marathoner in 2019 to professional runner in 2022, after getting more seriously into the sport during the UK's COVID lockdown. In 2019 she completed her first London marathon, in support of the charity Outward Bound, finishing in 4 hours 34 minutes.

In 2021, she finished the Manchester Marathon in 3 hours 5 minutes and 10 seconds. By 2022 had improved her first marathon finish time by two hours and was the third British woman across the line. For this performance, Athletics Weekly voted her the Most Improved UK Road Runner.

On 19 February 2023, Culling achieve her personal best half marathon time at the Barcelona Half Marathon, completing the race in 1 hour, 13 minutes and 44 seconds. A few months later, on 14 May 2023, Culling achieved her personal best marathon time at the Copenhagen Marathon, completing the race in 2 hours 34 minutes and 45 seconds and coming in eighth. In March 2024, Culling took part in The Speed Project, as part of an all-female team, which finished third in their category. She completed the 2024 London marathon in 2 hours 44 minutes and 00 seconds. As of 2025, she is in training for the 2026 Commonwealth Games.

Culling is sponsored by women's athletic apparel brand Lululemon.
