= List of Money in the Bank ladder matches =

The Money in the Bank ladder match is a multi-person ladder match held by the professional wrestling promotion WWE. First performed at WWE's annual WrestleMania event beginning in 2005, a separate Money in the Bank event was established in 2010. The match was originally only for male wrestlers but a women's version was introduced in 2017. The prize of the match is a briefcase containing a contract for a championship match of the winner's choice, which, within WWEs fictional storyline, can be "cashed in" by the holder of the briefcase at any point in the year following their victory.

== Matches ==
Raw brand	SmackDown brand

Year	Event	Prize	Winner	Other competitors	Time
2005	WrestleMania 21	World Heavyweight Championship match	Edge	Chris Benoit, Chris Jericho, Christian, Kane, and Shelton Benjamin	15:17
2005	In the 2005 WWE draft, World Heavyweight Champion Batista was drafted to SmackDown! while WWE Champion John Cena was drafted to Raw, thus enabling Edge to challenge for the WWE Championship instead.; Successfully defended his contract against Matt Hardy in a Ladder match on the WWE Homecoming episode of Raw on October 3, 2005.; Held the contract for 280 days.				
2006	WrestleMania 22	World championship match	Rob Van Dam	Bobby Lashley, Finlay, Matt Hardy, Ric Flair, and Shelton Benjamin	12:14
2006	Successfully defended his contract against Shelton Benjamin in a contract vs. championship winner take all match at Backlash, winning Benjamin's Intercontinental Championship in the process.; Held the contract for 70 days.				
2007	WrestleMania 23	World championship match	Mr. Kennedy	CM Punk, Edge, Finlay, Jeff Hardy, King Booker, Matt Hardy, and Randy Orton	24:10
2007	Held the contract for 36 days.; Lost his contract against Edge on the May 7, 2007 episode of Raw.; Edge held the contract for 1 day (4 days as recognized by WWE due to the episode of SmackDown! airing on tape delay).; Edge was transferred to SmackDown! after his successful cash-in.				
2008	WrestleMania XXIV	World championship match	CM Punk	Carlito, Chris Jericho, John Morrison, Montel Vontavious Porter, Mr. Kennedy, and Shelton Benjamin	15:12
2008	Held the contract for 92 days.; As a result of the cash-in, the World Heavyweight Championship transferred back to Raw.				
2009	WrestleMania 25	World championship match	CM Punk	Christian, Finlay, Kane, Kofi Kingston, Mark Henry, Montel Vontavious Porter, and Shelton Benjamin	14:32
2009	First person to win the ladder match twice.; Held the contract for 63 days.				
2010	WrestleMania XXVI	World championship match	Jack Swagger	Christian, Dolph Ziggler, Drew McIntyre, Evan Bourne, Kane, Kofi Kingston, Matt Hardy, Montel Vontavious Porter, and Shelton Benjamin	13:44
2010	Held the contract for 2 days (5 days as recognized by WWE due to the episode of SmackDown airing on tape delay); Transferred to SmackDown after his successful cash-in.				
2010	Money in the Bank	World Heavyweight Championship match	Kane	Big Show, Christian, Cody Rhodes, Dolph Ziggler, Drew McIntyre, Kofi Kingston, and Matt Hardy	26:18
2010	Held the contract for 49 minutes, which is the shortest time that any wrestler has held the contract before cashing in.				
2010	Money in the Bank	WWE Championship match	The Miz	Chris Jericho, Edge, Evan Bourne, John Morrison, Mark Henry, Randy Orton, and Ted DiBiase	20:26
2010	Held the contract for 127 days.				
2011	Money in the Bank	World Heavyweight Championship match	Daniel Bryan	Cody Rhodes, Heath Slater, Justin Gabriel, Kane, Sheamus, Sin Cara, and Wade Barrett	24:27
2011	First cash-in and win against Mark Henry on the November 25, 2011 episode of SmackDown was nullified.; Held the contract for 154 days.				
2011	Money in the Bank	WWE Championship match	Alberto Del Rio	Alex Riley, Evan Bourne, Jack Swagger, Kofi Kingston, Rey Mysterio, R-Truth, and The Miz	15:54
2011	Held the contract for 28 days.				
2012	Money in the Bank	World Heavyweight Championship match	Dolph Ziggler	Christian, Cody Rhodes, Damien Sandow, Santino Marella, Sin Cara, Tensai, and Tyson Kidd	18:23
2012	Successfully defended his contract against Chris Jericho in a career vs. contract match on the August 20, 2012 episode of Raw.; Successfully defended his contract against John Cena in a Ladder match at TLC: Tables, Ladders & Chairs.; Held the contract for 267 days.				
2012	Money in the Bank	WWE Championship match	John Cena	Big Show, Chris Jericho, Kane, and The Miz	20:15
2012	Held the contract for 8 days.				
2013	Money in the Bank	World Heavyweight Championship match	Damien Sandow	Antonio Cesaro, Cody Rhodes, Dean Ambrose, Fandango, Jack Swagger, and Wade Barrett	16:24
2013	Held the contract for 106 days.				
2013	Money in the Bank	WWE Championship match	Randy Orton	Christian, CM Punk, Daniel Bryan, Rob Van Dam, and Sheamus	28:38
2013	Held the contract for 35 days.				
2014	Money in the Bank	WWE World Heavyweight Championship match	Seth Rollins	Dean Ambrose, Dolph Ziggler, Kofi Kingston, Jack Swagger, and Rob Van Dam	23:10
2014	Held the contract for 273 days.				
2015	Money in the Bank	WWE World Heavyweight Championship match	Sheamus	Dolph Ziggler, Kane, Kofi Kingston, Neville, Randy Orton, and Roman Reigns	20:50
2015	Held the contract for 161 days.				
2016	Money in the Bank	WWE World Heavyweight Championship match	Dean Ambrose	Alberto Del Rio, Cesaro, Chris Jericho, Kevin Owens, and Sami Zayn	21:38
2016	Held the contract for 57 minutes.				
2017	Money in the Bank	WWE SmackDown Women's Championship match	James Ellsworth	Becky Lynch, Charlotte Flair, Carmella Natalya, and Tamina	13:20
2017	SmackDown General Manager Daniel Bryan stripped Carmella of the contract two days after the event because of interference by Carmella's manager James Ellsworth, who retrieved the briefcase for Carmella and dropped it to her. A rematch was scheduled for the June 27 episode of SmackDown Live.; Held the contract for 2 days.				
2017	Money in the Bank	WWE Championship match	Baron Corbin	AJ Styles, Dolph Ziggler, Kevin Owens, Sami Zayn, and Shinsuke Nakamura	29:45
2017	Held the contract for 58 days.				
2017	SmackDown Live	WWE SmackDown Women's Championship match	Carmella	Becky Lynch, Charlotte Flair, Natalya, and Tamina	24:00
2017	Rematch ordered by SmackDown General Manager Daniel Bryan after he stripped Carmella of the contract following the controversial finish at the Money in the Bank pay-per-view. As a result of his actions during the original match, James Ellsworth was banned from the arena, though Ellsworth still interfered in the match on Carmella's behalf.; Second person to win the ladder match twice.; Held the contract for 287 days, which is the longest time that any wrestler has held the contract.				
2018	Money in the Bank	Winner's brand women's championship match	Alexa Bliss	Becky Lynch, Charlotte Flair, Ember Moon, Lana, Naomi, Natalya, and Sasha Banks	18:30
2018	Held the contract for 2 hours and 52 minutes.				
2018	Money in the Bank	Winner's brand world championship match	Braun Strowman	Bobby Roode, Finn Bálor, Kevin Owens, Kofi Kingston, Rusev, Samoa Joe, and The Miz	19:53
2018	Successfully defended his contract against Kevin Owens at SummerSlam.; Held the contract for 72 days. To make his announced cash-in match at Hell in a Cell official, Strowman relinquished the contract on the August 27, 2018, episode of Raw				
2019	Money in the Bank	Women's championship match	Bayley	Carmella, Dana Brooke, Ember Moon, Mandy Rose, Naomi, Natalya, and Nikki Cross	13:50
2019	Held the contract for 1 hour and 25 minutes.				
2019	Money in the Bank	World championship match	Brock Lesnar	Ali, Andrade, Baron Corbin, Drew McIntyre, Finn Bálor, Randy Orton, and Ricochet	19:00
2019	Held the contract for 56 days.				
2020	Money in the Bank	Raw Women's Championship	Asuka	Carmella, Dana Brooke, Lacey Evans, Nia Jax, and Shayna Baszler	22:00
2020	Match occurred at the same time as the men's match but concluded first.; Held the contract for 25 days (Note: The match was pre-recorded on April 15 while the rest of the event aired live on May 10.) (1 day as recognized by WWE due to the match airing on tape delay).; On the May 11, 2020 episode of Raw, Raw Women's Champion Becky Lynch announced she was going on hiatus due to pregnancy and that the women's Money in the Bank ladder match had actually been for the championship, revealing to Asuka that inside the briefcase was the title belt.				
2020	Money in the Bank	World championship match	Otis	AJ Styles, Aleister Black, Daniel Bryan, King Corbin, and Rey Mysterio	27:15
2020	Match occurred at the same time as the women's match but concluded second.; Held the contract for 193 days (168 days as recognized by WWE due to the match airing on tape delay).; Lost his contract against The Miz at Hell in a Cell on October 25, 2020.; The Miz held the contract for 119 days.; The Miz initially cashed in the contract at TLC: Tables, Ladders & Chairs in a losing effort in the middle of a TLC Match for the WWE Championship between challenger AJ Styles and champion Drew McIntyre, but the cash-in was ruled invalid due to John Morrison cashing in on his behalf (only the contract holder is permitted to cash in the contract), and the contract was returned to him.				
2021	Money in the Bank	Women's championship match	Nikki A.S.H.	Asuka, Naomi, Alexa Bliss, Liv Morgan, Zelina Vega, Natalya, and Tamina	15:45
2021	Held the contract for 1 day.				
2021	Money in the Bank	World championship match	Big E	Drew McIntyre, John Morrison, Kevin Owens, King Nakamura, Ricochet, Riddle, and Seth Rollins	17:40
2021	Held the contract for 57 days.				
2022	Money in the Bank	Women's championship match	Liv Morgan	Alexa Bliss, Asuka, Becky Lynch, Lacey Evans, Raquel Rodriguez, and Shotzi	16:35
2022	Held the contract for 2 hours.				
2022	Money in the Bank	Men's championship match	Theory	Drew McIntyre, Madcap Moss, Omos, Riddle, Sami Zayn, Seth "Freakin" Rollins, and Sheamus	25:25
2022	Held the contract for 128 days.; Won the briefcase as Theory, but changed his name to Austin Theory on September 3, 2022.; First person to cash-in on a non-world championship.				
2023	Money in the Bank	Men's championship match	Damian Priest	Butch, LA Knight, Shinsuke Nakamura, Logan Paul, Ricochet, and Santos Escobar	20:25
2023	Held the contract for 281 days, which is the longest time that a male wrestler has held the contract.				
2023	Money in the Bank	Women's championship match	Iyo Sky	Bayley, Becky Lynch, Trish Stratus, Zelina Vega, and Zoey Stark	18:05
2023	Held the contract for 35 days.				
2024	Money in the Bank	Men's championship match	Drew McIntyre	Andrade, Carmelo Hayes, Chad Gable, Jey Uso, and LA Knight	16:30
2024	Held the contract for 1 hour and 25 minutes.				
2024	Money in the Bank	Women's championship match	Tiffany Stratton	Chelsea Green, Iyo Sky, Lyra Valkyria, Naomi, and Zoey Stark	16:50
2024	Held the contract for 181 days.				
2025	Money in the Bank	Men's championship match	Seth Rollins	Andrade, El Grande Americano, LA Knight, Penta, and Solo Sikoa	33:35
2025	Second male wrestler to win the ladder match twice.; Held the contract for 56 days.				
2025	Money in the Bank	Women's championship match	Naomi	Alexa Bliss, Giulia, Rhea Ripley, Roxanne Perez, and Stephanie Vaquer	25:15
2025	Held the contract for 36 days.				
2026	Money in the Bank	Men's championship match	Penta	Bron Breakker, CM Punk, Je'Von Evans, Kevin Owens, and Trick Williams	32:05
2026	Has held the contract for 29+ days.				
2026	Money in the Bank	Women's championship match	Tiffany Stratton	Jacy Jayne, Lash Legend, Lola Vice, Roxanne Perez, and Sol Ruca	15:20
2026	Second female wrestler to win the ladder match twice.; Held the contract for 28 days.; Became the only woman to successfully cash-in twice				

=== Record ===
Championship	Successful cash-ins	Attempts	Success rate
WWE Championship (Note: In December 2013, the WWE Championship and original World Heavyweight Championship were unified. The World Heavyweight Championship was retired while the WWE Championship became known as the WWE World Heavyweight Championship up through the 2016 event, after which, it reverted to being called the WWE Championship. Since April 2024, it has been called the Undisputed WWE Championship following the retirement of the WWE Universal Championship.)	10	12	.818
World Heavyweight Championship (original version)	7	8	.875
World Heavyweight Championship (current version)	2	3	.667
WWE Women's Championship (Note: The title was originally established as the WWE Women's Championship in April 2016. It was renamed as Raw Women's Championship in September 2016, but reverted to its original name in June 2023.)	5	5	1.000
Women's World Championship (Note: The title was established as the SmackDown Women's Championship in August 2016, but in June 2023, it was renamed as the Women's World Championship.)	4	4	1.000
WWE Universal Championship	1	2	.500
WWE United States Championship	0	1	.000
Men's cash-ins	20	26	.769
Women's cash-ins	8	8	1.000
Total	28	34	.824

== Cash-in matches ==
Won match and title	Won match but not title	Lost match	Match ended in draw or no contest

=== Men ===
No.	Case Holder	Championship	Date	Location	Event	Results
1	Edge	WWE Championship	January 8, 2006	Albany, NY	New Year's Revolution	Defeated John Cena after two Spears to win the championship after Cena had successfully defended the title against Carlito, Chris Masters, Kane, Kurt Angle, and Shawn Michaels in an Elimination Chamber match.
2	Rob Van Dam	WWE Championship	June 11, 2006	New York, NY	ECW One Night Stand	This was an Extreme Rules match announced ahead of time. Van Dam defeated John Cena after a run-in and Spear by Edge and a Five-Star Frog Splash to win the championship.
3	Edge	World Heavyweight Championship	May 8, 2007 (aired May 11, 2007)	Pittsburgh, PA	SmackDown!	Defeated The Undertaker after a Spear to win the championship after Undertaker went to a draw in a Steel Cage match with Batista and was attacked by Mark Henry.
4	CM Punk	World Heavyweight Championship	June 30, 2008	Oklahoma City, OK	Raw	Defeated Edge after a Go To Sleep to win the championship after Edge was attacked by Batista during a promo.
5	CM Punk	World Heavyweight Championship	June 7, 2009	New Orleans, LA	Extreme Rules	Defeated Jeff Hardy after two Go To Sleeps to win the championship after Hardy had defeated Edge in a Ladder match to win the title.
6	Jack Swagger	World Heavyweight Championship	March 30, 2010 (aired April 2, 2010)	Paradise, NV	SmackDown	Defeated Chris Jericho after a Gutwrench powerbomb to win the championship after Edge had attacked an already injured Jericho during a promo.
7	Kane	World Heavyweight Championship	July 18, 2010	Kansas City, MO	Money in the Bank	Defeated Rey Mysterio after a Chokeslam and a Tombstone Piledriver to win the championship after Mysterio had successfully defended the title against Jack Swagger.
8	The Miz	WWE Championship	November 22, 2010	Orlando, FL	Raw	Defeated Randy Orton after a Skull Crushing Finale to win the championship after Orton had successfully defended the title against Wade Barrett.
9	Alberto Del Rio	WWE Championship	August 14, 2011	Los Angeles, CA	SummerSlam	Defeated CM Punk after a Step-up enzuigiri to win the championship after Punk had defeated John Cena to become undisputed champion and was then attacked by Kevin Nash with a Jackknife powerbomb.
10	Daniel Bryan	World Heavyweight Championship	December 18, 2011	Baltimore, MD	TLC: Tables, Ladders & Chairs	Defeated Big Show after a DDT from Mark Henry onto a steel chair to win the championship after Show had defeated Henry in a Chairs match to win the title.
11	John Cena	WWE Championship	July 23, 2012	St Louis, MO	Raw 1000	This was a singles match, announced ahead of time. Cena won the match against defending champion CM Punk via disqualification after Big Show interfered, but failed to win the title because championships do not change hands via count-out or disqualification unless stipulated.
12	Dolph Ziggler	World Heavyweight Championship	April 8, 2013	East Rutherford, NJ	Raw	Defeated Alberto Del Rio after a Zig Zag to win the championship after Del Rio was attacked by Jack Swagger, who Del Rio had defeated along with Zeb Colter in a 2-on-1 Handicap match.
13	Randy Orton	WWE Championship	August 18, 2013	Los Angeles, CA	SummerSlam	Defeated Daniel Bryan after a Pedigree from Triple H to win the championship after Bryan had defeated John Cena to win the title in a match that featured Triple H as the special guest referee.
14	Damien Sandow	World Heavyweight Championship	October 28, 2013	Orlando, FL	Raw	Sandow was defeated by defending champion John Cena after an Attitude Adjustment after Sandow had attacked Cena during a promo.
15	Seth Rollins	WWE World Heavyweight Championship	March 29, 2015	Santa Clara, CA	WrestleMania 31	During a match between defending champion Brock Lesnar and Roman Reigns, Rollins ran-in and cashed in his contract. The referee accepted the cash-in while the match was in progress and converted the singles match into a triple threat match. Rollins then pinned Reigns after a Curb Stomp to win the championship.
16	Sheamus	WWE World Heavyweight Championship	November 22, 2015	Atlanta, GA	Survivor Series	Defeated Roman Reigns after a Brogue Kick to win the championship after Reigns had defeated Dean Ambrose to win the vacant title.
17	Dean Ambrose	WWE World Heavyweight Championship	June 19, 2016	Paradise, NV	Money in the Bank	Defeated Seth Rollins after a Dirty Deeds to win the championship after Rollins had defeated Roman Reigns to win the title.
18	Baron Corbin	WWE Championship	August 15, 2017	Providence, RI	SmackDown Live	Corbin was defeated by defending champion Jinder Mahal with a roll-up following a distraction by John Cena, who had just defeated Mahal by disqualification due to Corbin's interference.
19	Braun Strowman	WWE Universal Championship	September 16, 2018	San Antonio, TX	Hell in a Cell	This was a Hell in a Cell match with Mick Foley as the special guest referee, announced ahead of time. The match ended in a no-contest after a run-in by Brock Lesnar and Paul Heyman. Lesnar kicked in the cell door and laid out both Strowman and defending champion Roman Reigns, while Heyman incapacitated Foley with pepper spray; both competitors were deemed unable to continue by another referee.
20	Brock Lesnar	WWE Universal Championship	July 14, 2019	Philadelphia, PA	Extreme Rules	Defeated Seth Rollins after an F-5 to win the championship after Rollins and Raw Women's Champion Becky Lynch had successfully defended their respective titles against Baron Corbin and Lacey Evans in a Last Chance Winners Take All Extreme Rules mixed tag team match.
21	The Miz	WWE Championship	February 21, 2021	St. Petersburg, FL	Elimination Chamber	Defeated Drew McIntyre after a Skull Crushing Finale to win the championship after McIntyre had successfully defended the title against AJ Styles, Randy Orton, Sheamus, Jeff Hardy, and Kofi Kingston in an Elimination Chamber match and was then attacked by Bobby Lashley.
22	Big E	WWE Championship	September 13, 2021	Boston, MA	Raw	Defeated Bobby Lashley after a Big Ending to win the championship after Lashley had successfully defended the title against Randy Orton.
23	Austin Theory	WWE United States Championship	November 7, 2022	Wilkes-Barre, PA	Raw	Theory was defeated by defending champion Seth "Freakin" Rollins after a Curb Stomp after Rollins was attacked by Bobby Lashley during a promo.
24	Damian Priest	World Heavyweight Championship	April 7, 2024	Philadelphia, PA	WrestleMania XL; Night 2	Defeated Drew McIntyre after a South of Heaven to win the championship after McIntyre had defeated Seth "Freakin" Rollins to win the title and was then attacked by CM Punk.
25	Drew McIntyre	World Heavyweight Championship	July 6, 2024	Toronto, ON, Canada	Money in the Bank	During a match between defending champion Damian Priest and Seth "Freakin" Rollins, McIntyre ran-in and cashed in his contract. The referee accepted the cash-in while the match was in progress and converted the singles match into a triple threat match. Priest then pinned McIntyre after an attack by CM Punk and a South of Heaven to retain the championship.
26	Seth Rollins	World Heavyweight Championship	August 2, 2025	East Rutherford, NJ	SummerSlam; Night 1	Defeated CM Punk after a Curb Stomp to win the championship after Punk had defeated Gunther to win the title.
27	Penta					

=== Women ===
No.	Case Holder	Championship	Date	Location	Event	Results
1	Carmella	SmackDown Women's Championship	April 10, 2018	New Orleans, LA	SmackDown Live	Defeated Charlotte Flair after a Princess Kick to win the championship after Flair was attacked by the IIconics during a promo.
2	Alexa Bliss	Raw Women's Championship	June 17, 2018	Rosemont, IL	Money in the Bank	During a match between defending champion Nia Jax and Ronda Rousey, Bliss ran-in and attacked both competitors with her briefcase, causing the match to end in a disqualification win for Rousey, who was struck first. Bliss then cashed in the contract and defeated Jax after a Bliss DDT and a Twisted Bliss to win the championship.
3	Bayley	SmackDown Women's Championship	May 19, 2019	Hartford, CT	Money in the Bank	Defeated Charlotte Flair after a Bayley Elbow Drop to win the championship after Bayley attacked Flair to save Becky Lynch from a post-match beatdown from Flair (who had defeated Lynch to win the title) and Lacey Evans.
4	Nikki A.S.H.	Raw Women's Championship	July 19, 2021	Dallas, TX	Raw	Defeated Charlotte Flair after a diving crossbody to win the championship after Flair had gotten intentionally disqualified in her title defense against Rhea Ripley and was then attacked by Ripley after the match.
5	Liv Morgan	SmackDown Women's Championship	July 2, 2022	Paradise, NV	Money in the Bank	Defeated Ronda Rousey with a roll-up to win the championship after Rousey had successfully defended the title against Natalya.
6	Iyo Sky	WWE Women's Championship	August 5, 2023	Detroit, MI	SummerSlam	Defeated Bianca Belair after an Over the Moonsault to win the championship after Belair had won the title in a triple threat match against Asuka and Charlotte Flair.
7	Tiffany Stratton	WWE Women's Championship	January 3, 2025	Phoenix, AZ	SmackDown	Defeated Nia Jax after a Prettiest Moonsault Ever to win the championship after Jax had defeated Naomi to retain the championship with Stratton's interference, then was attacked by Stratton during a beatdown of Naomi's tag team partner Bianca Belair, who set up the opportunity with a K.O.D on Jax.
8	Naomi	Women's World Championship	July 13, 2025	Atlanta, GA	Evolution	During a match between defending champion Iyo Sky and Rhea Ripley, Naomi ran-in and cashed in her contract. The referee accepted the cash-in while the match was in progress and converted the singles match into a triple threat match. Naomi then pinned Sky after a split legged moonsault to win the championship.
9	Tiffany Stratton	WWE Women's Championship	November 7, 2026	Riyadh, Saudi Arabia	Crown Jewel	Defeated Chelsea Green after Green defeated Liv Morgan to win the WWE Women's Crown Jewel Championship.
