= Money in the Bank (2024) =

WWE premium live event

- Promotional poster featuring Jey Uso and the Money in the Bank briefcase
- Promotion: WWE
- Brand(s): Raw; SmackDown
- Date: July 6, 2024
- City: Toronto, Ontario, Canada
- Venue: Scotiabank Arena
- Attendance: 19,858

WWE event chronology
← Previous; Clash at the Castle	Next → NXT Heatwave

Money in the Bank chronology
← Previous; 2023	Next → 2025

WWE in Canada chronology
← Previous; New Year's Revolution	Next → Heatwave

The 2024 Money in the Bank was a professional wrestling premium live event (PLE) produced by the American company WWE, held for wrestlers from the promotion's main roster brands, Raw and SmackDown. It was the 15th annual Money in the Bank event and took place on Saturday, July 6, 2024, at the Scotiabank Arena in Toronto, Ontario, Canada. The event centered on the Money in the Bank ladder match, a multi-person ladder match where the wrestlers compete to retrieve a briefcase hanging above the ring which contains a contract for a guaranteed championship match at any time within the next year. WWE Hall of Famer and Toronto native Trish Stratus was the hostess of the event.

Five matches were contested at the event. In the main event, which was SmackDown's main match, The Bloodline (Solo Sikoa, Jacob Fatu, and Tama Tonga) defeated Cody Rhodes, Kevin Owens, and Randy Orton in a six-man tag team match. This was Jacob Fatu's WWE in-ring debut and the first appearance of Tonga Loa since the 2012 event when he was previously known as Camacho. For the Money in the Bank ladder matches, Raw's Drew McIntyre and SmackDown's Tiffany Stratton won their respective matches, the former of which was the opening bout. In another prominent match, which was Raw's main match, Damian Priest defeated Seth "Freakin" Rollins and Drew McIntyre in a triple threat match to retain the World Heavyweight Championship; the match started as a regular singles match between Priest and Rollins, but midway through, McIntyre cashed in the Money in the Bank contract he had won earlier, converting the match into a triple threat. It was also originally stipulated that if Rollins lost, he could never challenge for the title again for as long as Priest was champion, but this was later lifted out of mutual respect between the two. The event also saw a surprise appearance by John Cena, who announced that 2025 would be his final year as an in-ring performer.

This was the first Money in the Bank event to be held in Canada, and the second consecutive to take place outside of the United States. This was also the first Money in the Bank to livestream on Abema in Japan and the final Money in the Bank to air on Disney+ Hotstar in Indonesia, Binge in Australia, and the standalone WWE Network in most other international markets, as WWE's content in those areas moved to Netflix in January 2025, as well as the last on SonyLIV in India, which moved to Netflix in April 2025.

== Production ==
=== Background ===
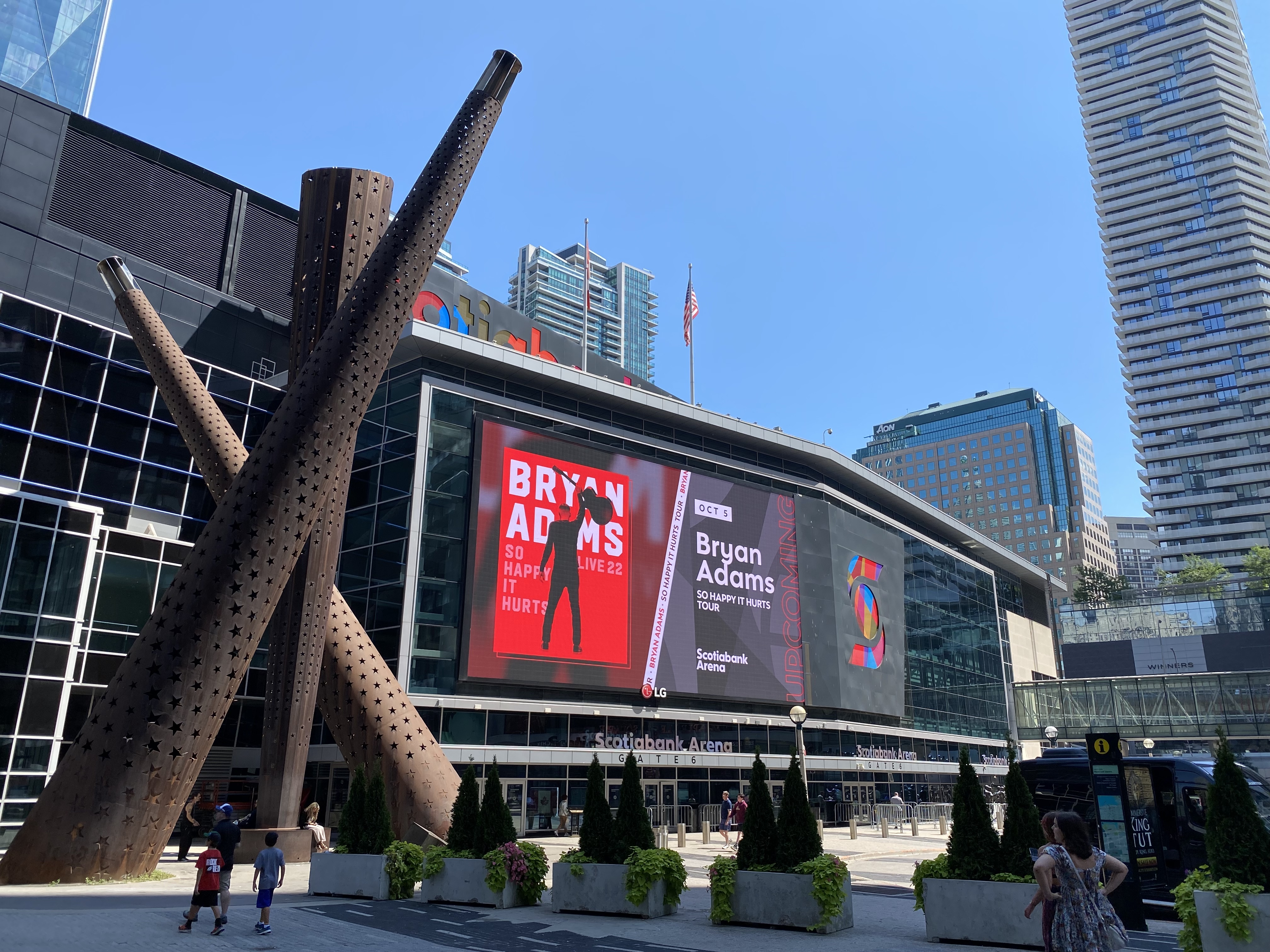
The 15th annual Money in the Bank event was held at the Scotiabank Arena in Toronto, Ontario, Canada, marking the first Money in the Bank to be held in the country.

Money in the Bank is an annual professional wrestling premium live event (PLE) produced by the American promotion WWE since 2010, generally held between May and July. It was originally broadcast exclusively via pay-per-view (PPV) before it began simulcasting on WWE's livestreaming platforms in 2014. As of August 2021, it is considered one of the promotion's five biggest PLEs of the year, along with WrestleMania, Royal Rumble, SummerSlam, and Survivor Series, referred to as the "Big Five". The concept of the show comes from WWE's established Money in the Bank ladder match.

On January 4, 2024, the 15th Money in the Bank event was announced to be held on Saturday, July 6, 2024, at the Scotiabank Arena in Toronto, Ontario, Canada, marking the first Money in the Bank to be held in the country and the second to be held outside of the United States, after the 2023 event, which was held in London, England. The show was promoted as being part of a three-night "Money in the Bank Weekend" event, as the preceding night's episode of Friday Night SmackDown on July 5 and NXT's PLE, Heatwave, the following night on July 7 also took place at the Scotiabank Arena. Tickets for all three events went on sale on March 15, 2024, with combo and hospitality packages available. The official theme song of the event was "Tap" by NAV featuring Meek Mill, making it the first Money in the Bank event since 2010 to have a theme song by a recording artist (replacing "Gotta Get That", renamed to "Cash In" in 2023, which was used from 2019 to 2023). On July 5, WWE Hall of Famer and Toronto native Trish Stratus was revealed to be the hostess of the 2024 Money in the Bank.

The Money in the Bank ladder match features multiple wrestlers using ladders to retrieve a briefcase hanging above the ring. The briefcase contains a contract that guarantees the winner a match for a championship of their choosing at any time within the next year. The contract was originally for a world championship match, but beginning in 2022, it can be used on any championship. The 2024 matches were announced to have six participants each, evenly divided between wrestlers from the Raw and SmackDown brand divisions.

=== Broadcast outlets ===
Money in the Bank was broadcast live on traditional PPV worldwide. It was also available to livestream on Peacock in the United States, SonyLIV in India, Disney+ Hotstar in Indonesia, Disney+ in the Philippines, Binge in Australia, Abema in Japan, and the WWE Network everywhere else. This was the first Money in the Bank to livestream on Abema after the Japanese version of the WWE Network merged under Abema in October 2023.

Following an announcement made on January 23, this was the final Money in the Bank to air on the standalone WWE Network in most international markets where it was still available, as well as Disney+ Hotstar and Binge, as its content moved to Netflix in January 2025; a select few territories maintained the standalone WWE Network until early 2026 due to pre-existing contracts before they also merged under Netflix when those contracts expired.

=== Storylines ===
The card included five matches that resulted from scripted storylines. Results were predetermined by WWE's writers on the Raw and SmackDown brands, while storylines were produced on WWE's weekly television programs, Monday Night Raw and Friday Night SmackDown.

Qualifying matches for the women's Money in the Bank ladder match began on the June 17 episode of Raw. The qualifiers were held as a series of six triple threat matches, with three each on Raw and SmackDown. Iyo Sky claimed Raw's first spot by defeating Kiana James and Zelina Vega. Chelsea Green became the first from SmackDown to qualify by defeating Bianca Belair and Michin on the June 21 episode of SmackDown. On the June 24 episode of Raw, Lyra Valkyria became the second to qualify from Raw by defeating Kairi Sane and Shayna Baszler. SmackDown's final two spots were determined on the June 28 episode of SmackDown where Tiffany Stratton defeated Jade Cargill and Candice LeRae, with Naomi defeating Blair Davenport and Indi Hartwell. Raw's final spot was won by Zoey Stark, who defeated Dakota Kai and Ivy Nile on the July 1 episode of Raw.

The men's Money in the Bank ladder match qualifiers also began on the June 17 episode of Raw and were also held as a series of six triple threat matches with three each on Raw and SmackDown. Jey Uso won Raw's first spot by defeating Finn Bálor and Rey Mysterio. Two of SmackDown's participants were determined on the June 21 episode of SmackDown where Carmelo Hayes qualified by defeating Randy Orton and Tama Tonga, with Andrade qualifying by defeating Grayson Waller and Kevin Owens. The second spot from Raw was earned by Chad Gable, who defeated Braun Strowman and Bronson Reed on the June 24 episode of Raw. SmackDown's final spot was won by LA Knight, who defeated Logan Paul and Santos Escobar on the June 28 episode of SmackDown, followed by Drew McIntyre claiming Raw's final spot by defeating Sheamus and Ilja Dragunov on the July 1 episode of Raw.

On Night 2 of WrestleMania XL on April 7, Seth "Freakin" Rollins lost the World Heavyweight Championship to Drew McIntyre, who would in turn immediately lose the title to Damian Priest in the latter's Money in the Bank cash-in match. Rollins then took time off due to a knee injury. On the June 17 episode of Raw, Rollins made his return from the injury, stating his intentions to reclaim the title. As Rollins was about to announce his participation in the men's Money in the Bank ladder match, he was interrupted by Priest, who said that out of respect, he had actually wanted to cash-in on Rollins at WrestleMania. Rollins noted their similarities in which both had won their first world championships via a Money in the Bank cash-in at WrestleMania, with Rollins's occurring at WrestleMania 31 in 2015. After being asked by Rollins what he wanted his legacy to be, Priest decided to challenge Rollins at Money in the Bank with the World Heavyweight Championship on the line and Rollins accepted. The match was subsequently made official. The following week, Priest declared that Rollins would never see "the mountaintop" as long as he was champion. Rollins came out and proposed that if he lost, he could never challenge for the title again for as long as Priest was champion, but if he won, Priest would be forced to leave The Judgment Day; Priest accepted.

On the June 17 episode of Raw, as Sami Zayn was celebrating his successful Intercontinental Championship defense from Clash at the Castle, he was interrupted by Bron Breakker, who stated that he wanted Zayn's championship. On the next episode, Zayn confronted Breakker backstage outside of Raw General Manager Adam Pearce's office and agreed to defend the title against Breakker in Zayn's home country of Canada at Money in the Bank, and Pearce made it official.

In April, Solo Sikoa became the de facto leader of The Bloodline after Roman Reigns lost the Undisputed WWE Championship to Cody Rhodes on Night 2 of WrestleMania XL, with Reigns subsequently taking a hiatus. On the following SmackDown, Sikoa introduced Tama Tonga as the newest addition to the group. During this time, Kevin Owens and Randy Orton, who previously had their own respective issues with The Bloodline, began to team up against the stable and at Backlash, The Bloodline's newest member Tonga Loa helped Tama and Sikoa defeat Owens and Orton in a Street Fight. Orton and Owens then continued to be involved in numerous matches against members of The Bloodline. After Rhodes successfully defended the Undisputed WWE Championship at Clash at the Castle, he was attacked by The Bloodline with Orton and Owens making the save. On the following episode of SmackDown, Orton and Tama competed in a Money in the Bank qualifying match, but despite Loa's interference, the two lost. Later, Owens was attacked by Tama and Loa, which also cost him a qualifying match. Also that same night, a non-title match between Sikoa and Rhodes ended in a no contest after another interference from The Bloodline. Owens and Orton tried to save Rhodes, but they were all attacked by another new Bloodline member, the debuting Jacob Fatu. On June 24, a six-man tag team match pitting The Bloodline against Rhodes, Owens, and Orton was announced for Money in the Bank.

== Event ==
Other on-screen personnel
Role:	Name:
Host	Trish Stratus
English commentators	Michael Cole
English commentators	Corey Graves
Spanish commentators	Marcelo Rodríguez
Spanish commentators	Jerry Soto
Ring announcer	Samantha Irvin
Referees	Danilo Anfibio
Referees	Jason Ayers
Referees	Jessika Carr
Referees	Daphanie LaShaunn
Referees	Eddie Orengo
Referees	Charles Robinson
Referees	Rod Zapata
Interviewer	Cathy Kelley
Pre-show panel	Jackie Redmond
Pre-show panel	Big E
Pre-show panel	Wade Barrett

=== Preliminary matches ===
The PLE opened with the men's Money in the Bank ladder match, which involved Jey Uso, Chad Gable, and Drew McIntyre from Raw and Andrade, Carmelo Hayes, and LA Knight from SmackDown. Andrade performed a springboard Spanish Fly to Hayes off the top rope onto a ladder. Gable began dominating the ring, including german suplexing a ladder onto Andrade. Andrade performed a Sunset Flip on Hayes off one ladder onto another, taking both men out for the remainder of the match. Gable dumped Knight over the ropes onto a ladder outside the ring, and climbed another ladder to reached the briefcase, but Uso pulled out the ladder from underneath him. Gable, unable to hang on to the briefcase, fell to the mat. Uso ascended the ladder and was in the process of unhooking the briefcase when McIntyre threw a ladder like a javelin at him, knocking Uso off before ascending the ladder himself to unhook the briefcase and win the match.

The next match saw Sami Zayn defend Raw's Intercontinental Championship against Bron Breakker. Breakker began the match dominant, and caught Zayn off guard with his high powered offense. Breakker performed a Franken-stiener off the top rope for a near fall. Zayn countered a spear and hit Breakker with a Helluva Kick to pin Breakker and retain the title.

Next, Trish Stratus announced that a surprise guest would be appearing. John Cena returned for the first time since the Raw after WrestleMania XL in April, wearing a t-shirt saying "John Cena Farewell Tour 2025" and holding a towel saying "the last time is now". Making his way to the ring, Cena announced that he would be retiring as an in-ring performer at the end of 2025, and that WrestleMania 41 would be his last WrestleMania. He thanked the fans for their support throughout the years, and said that if any fans wanted to see him one last time, or if any WWE wrestler wanted one last chance to fight him, this farewell tour would be their last opportunity.

Next, Damian Priest defended Raw's World Heavyweight Championship against Seth "Freakin" Rollins with the added stipulation that if Priest retained, Rollins could never challenge for the title again for as long as Priest was champion, but if Rollins won, Priest would have to leave The Judgment Day. The two both began with heavy offense, trading kicks to each other and powerbombs. Rollins hit his curb stomp finisher on Priest for a nearfall, before Priest hit Rollins with a Razor's Edge, also a nearfall. After a superplex from the top rope, Rollins hit Priest with a Falcon Arrow, pinning Priest, but the referee stopped the count at 2. Shortly afterwards, Drew McIntyre's music hit and he ran down to the ring and cashed in his newly won Money in the Bank contract, converting the singles match into a triple threat match for the title. However, he was quickly attacked by CM Punk, who had been feuding with McIntyre for months. Punk beat him with a steel chair and choked him with a camera cable before striking McIntyre with the title. Priest then delivered a chokeslam and pinned McIntyre to retain the title. As a result, Rollins was barred from challenging for the title for as long as Priest was champion, and also made McIntyre the sixth wrestler to fail a Money in the Bank cash-in. Punk's interference subsequently cost Rollins the title, who berated Punk after the match, reigniting a feud between them that had started before Punk had gotten injured at the Royal Rumble in January. The failed pin on Priest was a legitimate botch, and after the match, Dave Meltzer of the Wrestling Observer Newsletter reported that either WWE production had mistimed the cue for McIntyre's music, which was supposed to interrupt the count, or that Priest was supposed to kick out but had been concussed by the move, forcing the referee to pretend that there had been a kick out.

The penultimate match was the women's Money in the Bank match, involving Iyo Sky, Lyra Valkyria, and Zoey Stark from Raw and Chelsea Green, Naomi, and Tiffany Stratton from SmackDown. Stark utilized a ladder to attack Valkyria. Stratton jumped off the turnbuckle onto the group, taking them out. Stark attempted to climb the ladder, but Sky performed a piledriver off the top of the ladder onto another ladder. Green climbed the ladder, and as she was about to grab the briefcase, Stratton tipped the ladder over, causing Green to crash through a stack of tables ringside. Stratton then climbed the ladder and unhooked the briefcase to win the match.

=== Main event ===
The main event saw a six-man tag team match pitting the team of Cody Rhodes, Randy Orton, and Kevin Owens against The Bloodline (Solo Sikoa, Tama Tonga, and Jacob Fatu, accompanied by Tonga Loa). Rhodes started the match against Tama, but quickly tagged in Owens, who unleashed his fury on Tama. Tama managed to tag in Fatu, who was dominant against Owens. Owens tagged in Orton, who hit Fatu with a draped DDT but Fatu was unharmed by the move and immediately stood back up, taking down Orton. Orton tagged Owens back in, but the Bloodline worked together to beat him down and prevent him from reaching his corner. Owens eventually tagged in Rhodes, who began attacking Sikoa. He also performed consecutive suicide dives on the other Bloodline members outside the ring, also shoving Loa into the announce table. Sikoa accidentally knocked the referee out of the ring, and without the official, chaos unfolded. Owens hit a stunner on Tama outside the ring, and all three members of their team hit finishers on Sikoa. Owens put Fatu through the announce table but Loa low-blowed him. Rhodes hit two successive Cross Rhodes on Sikoa, but before he could go for a third, Fatu hit Rhodes with an Implant DDT, before holding him up for Sikoa to hit a Samoan Spike and pin Rhodes to win the match.

== Reception ==
The event set the record for the highest arena gate for WWE in Canada.

Dave Meltzer of the Wrestling Observer Newsletter rated the Women's Money In The Bank Ladder match 4.25 stars, the highest rated match of the night and the highest rated Women's Money In The Bank Ladder match up to this point. He rated the main event, World Heavyweight Championship match, and the Intercontinental Championship match all 3.75 stars, the lowest rated matches of the night. Finally, he rated the Men's Money In The Bank Ladder match 4 stars.

== Aftermath ==
In addition to the majority of countries moving to Netflix in January 2025, this would also be the final Money in the Bank to air on SonyLIV in India following the expiration of WWE's contract with SonyLIV with India then moving to Netflix on April 1, 2025.

=== Raw ===
As a result of their actions, both Drew McIntyre and CM Punk were fined, while McIntyre was suspended due to attacking Raw General Manager Adam Pearce during the post-show press conference. Punk opened the following episode of Raw and stated that he was trying to teach McIntyre that there were consequences for his actions. He also stated that he fulfilled his promise that McIntyre would not be world champion for as long as Punk was around and that he wanted to face McIntyre, but could not due to McIntyre's suspension. Seth "Freakin" Rollins then interrupted Punk who half-heartedly apologized to Rollins for costing him the title as he was taking care of his own business with McIntyre. Rollins then warned Punk that actions have consequences. A match between McIntyre and Punk would later be scheduled for SummerSlam with Rollins as the special guest referee.

During a backstage segment on the following Raw, Seth "Freakin" Rollins conversed with World Heavyweight Champion Damian Priest. They both showed mutual respect for one another for keeping their respective word regarding the championship match at Money in the Bank. Priest then decided to lift the ruling that Rollins cannot challenge him for the title and stated that after he defeated Gunther at SummerSlam, Rollins could challenge for the title whenever he wanted.

Also on the following Raw, Bron Breakker interrupted Intercontinental Champion Sami Zayn. Breakker noted that Zayn was the only person in the Raw locker room to defeat him and that he had no reason to deserve a rematch but then viciously attacked Zayn. On the July 22 episode, Breakker defeated Ilja Dragunov via referee stoppage to earn a rematch against Zayn for the title at SummerSlam.

=== SmackDown ===
On the following episode of SmackDown, The Bloodline (Solo Sikoa, Jacob Fatu, Tama Tonga, and Tonga Loa) talked about their win at Money in the Bank when Cody Rhodes interrupted and said he knew Sikoa wanted a match for the Undisputed WWE Championship at SummerSlam and accepted the challenge. The Bloodline then attacked him and fended off an attack by Randy Orton before powerbombing Orton through the commentator's table.

On the same episode of SmackDown, Tiffany Stratton came into the ring to gloat about her victory, where she was confronted by Bayley. After Nia Jax joined her in the ring, Bayley implied that if Jax beat her at SummerSlam - Jax having won the Queen of the Ring tournament, thus giving her a title shot - Stratton may cash in on her, instead. After a match between Jax and Michin, Bayley was knocked down and Stratton seemed close to cashing her contract on her, then and there, before Jax glared at her, and the two left the ring. Stratton would eventually cash in the contract on Jax on the January 3, 2025, episode of SmackDown to win the WWE Women's Championship.

LA Knight made an important note of how he pinned Logan Paul to be in the men's Money in the Bank ladder match and challenged him for the United States Championship, which was subsequently scheduled for SummerSlam.

== Results ==
No.	Results	Stipulations	Times
1	Drew McIntyre defeated Andrade, Carmelo Hayes, Chad Gable, Jey Uso, and LA Knight by retrieving the briefcase	Money in the Bank ladder match for a men's championship match contract	16:30
2	Sami Zayn (c) defeated Bron Breakker by pinfall	Singles match for the WWE Intercontinental Championship	13:15
3	Damian Priest (c) defeated Seth "Freakin" Rollins and Drew McIntyre (Note: The match was originally a Last Chance match between Priest and Rollins; however, as the match was in progress, McIntyre cashed in his Money in the Bank contract, converting it into a triple threat match.) by pinfall	Triple threat match for the World Heavyweight Championship; This was McIntyre's Money in the Bank cash-in match. Originally, the stipulation was that if Rollins lost, he could never challenge for the title again for as long as Priest was champion; however, Priest and Rollins agreed to retroactively lift this stipulation on the July 8 episode of Raw. Had Priest lost, he would have had to leave The Judgment Day.	14:40
4	Tiffany Stratton defeated Chelsea Green, Iyo Sky, Lyra Valkyria, Naomi, and Zoey Stark by retrieving the briefcase	Money in the Bank ladder match for a women's championship match contract	16:50
5	The Bloodline (Solo Sikoa, Jacob Fatu, and Tama Tonga) (with Tonga Loa) defeated Cody Rhodes, Kevin Owens, and Randy Orton by pinfall	Six-man tag team match	24:40
(c) / – the champion(s) heading into the match

== See also ==
- WWE in Canada
- Professional wrestling in Canada
