= Money in the Bank (2016) =

WWE pay-per-view and livestreaming event

- Promotional poster featuring Roman Reigns
- Promotion: WWE
- Date: June 19, 2016
- City: Paradise, Nevada
- Venue: T-Mobile Arena
- Attendance: 14,150

WWE event chronology
← Previous; NXT TakeOver: The End	Next → Battleground

Money in the Bank chronology
← Previous; 2015	Next → 2017

The 2016 Money in the Bank was a professional wrestling pay-per-view (PPV) and livestreaming event produced by WWE. It was the seventh annual Money in the Bank event and took place on June 19, 2016, at the T-Mobile Arena in the Las Vegas suburb of Paradise, Nevada. The event centered on the men's Money in the Bank ladder match, a multi-person ladder match where the wrestlers compete to retrieve a briefcase hanging above the ring which contains a contract for a guaranteed world championship match at any time within the next year.

Eleven matches were contested at the event, with two matches contested on the Kickoff pre-show. The main event saw Seth Rollins defeat Roman Reigns to win the WWE World Heavyweight Championship, only to lose it minutes later to Dean Ambrose, who cashed in his Money in the Bank contract that he won in the eponymous match earlier in the event. As a result, all three former Shield members were all WWE World Heavyweight Champion the same night; a week after the event, the title's name was truncated to WWE Championship. Also on the card, AJ Styles defeated John Cena. Two days after the event, former champion Reigns was suspended for violating WWE's Wellness Program.

This was the first WWE event to take place at this venue, and also WWE's last PPV and livestreaming event to be held before the reintroduction of the brand extension in July. This was also the last Money in the Bank event to have only a men's Money in the Bank ladder match as a women's version was introduced the following year.

== Production ==
=== Background ===
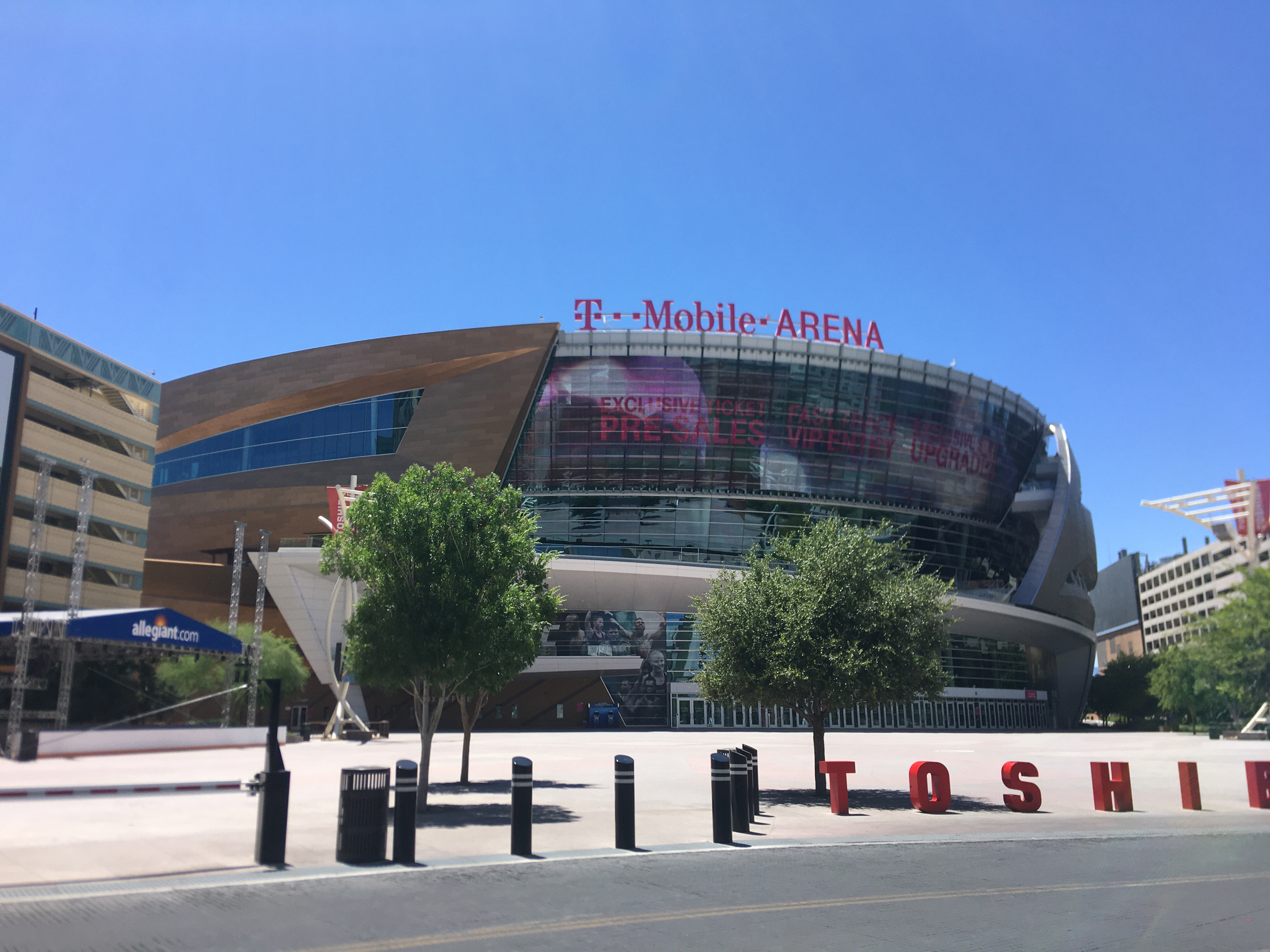
The seventh annual Money in the Bank event was held at the T-Mobile Arena in the Las Vegas suburb of Paradise, Nevada.

Money in the Bank is an annual professional wrestling event produced by WWE since 2010, which at the time was generally held between June and July. It was originally broadcast exclusively via pay-per-view (PPV) before it began simultaneously livestreaming on the WWE Network in 2014. The concept of the event comes from WWE's established Money in the Bank ladder match, in which multiple wrestlers use ladders to retrieve a briefcase hanging above the ring. The briefcase contains a contract that guarantees the winner a match for a world championship at any time within the next year, with the 2016 match awarding a WWE World Heavyweight Championship match. The seventh Money in the Bank event took place on June 19, 2016, at the T-Mobile Arena in the Las Vegas suburb of Paradise, Nevada. Tickets went on sale on April 8.

=== Storylines ===
The event comprised 11 matches, including two on the Kickoff pre-show, that resulted from scripted storylines. Results were predetermined by WWE's writers, while storylines were produced on WWE's weekly television shows, Raw and SmackDown.

On November 4, 2015, Seth Rollins was forced to vacate the WWE World Heavyweight Championship due to injury. Rollins returned on May 22, 2016, at Extreme Rules, attacking champion Roman Reigns after his successful title defense against AJ Styles. Rollins was granted a title match against Reigns at Money in the Bank the next night on Raw by Shane McMahon. Meanwhile, critics wondered if WWE was "leaving money on the table" by not slotting Rollins as a face and Reigns as a heel, as this was the opposite of what fans wanted (fans were cheering Rollins and booing Reigns).

On the May 30 episode of Raw, John Cena returned after recovering from a shoulder injury that left him out of action for five months. AJ Styles then came out to welcome him back until Luke Gallows and Karl Anderson, Styles' former teammates in The club (which had broken up the previous week on Raw) appeared looking for a fight. Cena and Styles prepared to brawl with them, until Styles attacked Cena alongside Gallows and Anderson, turning heel and reforming The Club in the process. On June 3, a match between Cena and Styles was scheduled for Money in the Bank which WWE labeled as a "WrestleMania Dream Match". On the June 13 episode of Raw, Cena presented Styles with two contracts: one allowing Gallows and Anderson to be in his corner, the other banning them so they could fight uninterrupted, and Styles chose the latter.

On the May 23 episode of Raw, Sami Zayn, Cesaro, Chris Jericho, Dean Ambrose, and Kevin Owens all qualified for the Money in the Bank ladder match by defeating Sheamus, The Miz, Apollo Crews, Dolph Ziggler, and AJ Styles, respectively. On the May 26 episode of SmackDown, Alberto Del Rio defeated Zack Ryder to qualify for the match.

At Payback, the final match in a tournament to determine the #1 contender for the WWE Tag Team Championship, pitting The Vaudevillains (Aiden English and Simon Gotch) against Enzo and Cass, ended in a no contest after Enzo Amore suffered a legit concussion. Subsequently, the Vaudevillains challenged WWE Tag Team Champions The New Day (Big E and Xavier Woods, accompanied by Kofi Kingston) at Extreme Rules in a losing effort. On the May 30 episode of Raw, during a rematch between The Vaudevillains and The New Day, Luke Gallows and Karl Anderson attacked The New Day. The following week on Raw, The Vaudevillains defeated Amore and Cass by disqualification. Later in the night, Gallows and Anderson defeated The New Day. Taking an idea by Teddy Long, Stephanie McMahon scheduled the four teams in a match at Money in the Bank in a fatal four-way tag team match for the WWE Tag Team Championship.

On the May 26 episode of SmackDown, after WWE United States Champion Rusev defeated Kalisto to retain the title, Titus O'Neil came out to help Kalisto when Rusev refused to break his Accolade submission hold. On the May 30 episode of Raw, after defeating Zack Ryder, Rusev started to insult the crowd and declared himself a "true American hero", leading to O'Neil coming out and punching Rusev. On June 8, a match between O'Neil and Rusev for the United States Championship was scheduled for Money in the Bank. On the June 13 episode of Raw, Titus O'Neil walked out for his match when Rusev attacked him on the stage and applied the Accolade, as WWE officials tried to pull Rusev off of O'Neil.

At Extreme Rules, WWE Women's Champion Charlotte defeated Natalya due to distraction by Dana Brooke dressing as Ric Flair. On the May 23 episode of Raw, Charlotte turned on her father Ric Flair, claiming he was no longer needed and therefore, aligned herself with Dana Brooke as her protege. On the May 26 episode of SmackDown, Natalya defeated Brooke by disqualification. On the May 30 episode of Raw, after Brooke defeated Natalya, Becky Lynch came out to help Natalya. On the June 2 episode of SmackDown, Lynch defeated Charlotte by disqualification. On the June 9 episode of SmackDown, Lynch defeated Brooke. On June 13, a match pitting Charlotte and Brooke against Natalya and Lynch was scheduled for Money in the Bank.

On the Extreme Rules Kickoff pre-show, Baron Corbin defeated Dolph Ziggler in a No Disqualification match after deliberately using a low blow before the End of Days. The next night on Raw, Ziggler challenged Corbin to a "technical wrestling match" for next week on Raw, which Corbin accepted. On the May 30 episode of Raw, Ziggler was disqualified after deliberately hitting Corbin with a low blow as retaliation for what happened at Extreme Rules. On June 17, another match between the two was scheduled for Money in the Bank.

On the May 23 episode of Raw, frustration toward losing his Money in the Bank qualifying match to Sami Zayn earlier in the night, Sheamus attacked Apollo Crews during a backstage interview with Renee Young, telling Crews that he's sick of him promoting the "New Era" and that no one would replace him, leading to Crews losing his Money in the Bank qualifying match to Chris Jericho later in the show. On the June 9 episode of SmackDown, backstage watching the Teenage Mutant Ninja Turtles: Out of the Shadows movie, Sheamus bragged to Zack Ryder, Goldust, R-Truth, and Summer Rae about how great he was and how everyone should be waiting on him and how he is an A-list star, leading to Apollo Crews confronting Sheamus and punching him, sending Sheamus into a number of cardboard boxes behind him. On the June 13 episode of Raw, after defeating Zack Ryder, Sheamus continued to viciously attack Ryder leading to Crews coming down to help Ryder. On June 17, a match pitting the two was scheduled for Money in the Bank.

After Goldust replaced R-Truth with Fandango as his tag team partner in their match in the Team Championship #1 contender tournament on the April 14 episode of SmackDown, R-Truth found a new partner in Tyler Breeze. Following singles match victory on Raw by Breeze over Goldust and R-Truth over Fandango, the two teams faced each other on the May 12 episode of SmackDown; Tyler Breeze and R-Truth defeated Goldust and Fandango when Fandango turned on his partner. After the match, Fandango and Breeze continued to attack Goldust, who was then rescued by R-Truth. After Breezango (Breeze and Fandango's new tag team name) defeated Golden Truth (Goldust and R-Truth) on the May 16 and the May 26 episode of Raw, a third match between the two teams was scheduled on June 17 for the Money in the Bank Kickoff pre-show.

On June 17, a match pitting The Lucha Dragons (Kalisto and Sin Cara) against The Dudley Boyz (Bubba Ray Dudley and D-Von Dudley) was scheduled for the Money in the Bank Kickoff pre-show.

== Event ==
Other on-screen personnel
Role:	Name:
English commentators	Michael Cole
English commentators	John "Bradshaw" Layfield
English commentators	Byron Saxton
English commentators	Mauro Ranallo
Spanish commentators	Carlos Cabrera
Spanish commentators	Marcelo Rodríguez
German commentators	Carsten Schaefer
German commentators	Sebastian Hackl
Ring announcers	Lilian Garcia
Ring announcers	JoJo
Referees	Charles Robinson
Referees	John Cone
Referees	Mike Chioda
Referees	Jason Ayers
Referees	Rod Zapata
Referees	Darrick Moore
Referees	Ryan Tran
Backstage interviewer	Tom Phillips
Pre-show panel	Renee Young
Pre-show panel	Corey Graves
Pre-show panel	Lita
Pre-show panel	Booker T

=== Pre-show ===
Two matches were contested during the Money in the Bank Kickoff pre-show. In the first match, The Golden Truth (Goldust and R-Truth) faced Breezango (Tyler Breeze and Fandango). Breezango suffered from major cases of sunburn, which their opponents exploited throughout the match. The end came when Goldust executed a Final Cut on Fandango to win the match.

In the final match, The Lucha Dragons (Kalisto and Sin Cara) wrestled The Dudley Boyz (Bubba Ray Dudley and D-Von Dudley). In the end, Kalisto executed a Salida Del Sol on Bubba Ray followed by Cara performing a Swanton Bomb on Bubba Ray to win the match.

=== Preliminary matches ===
The actual pay-per-view opened with The New Day (Big E and Kofi Kingston) (with Xavier Woods) defending the WWE Tag Team Championship against Luke Gallows and Karl Anderson, Enzo and Cass, and The Vaudevillains (Aiden English and Simon Gotch) in a fatal four-way tag team match. The match ended with Big E and Kingston executing the Midnight Hour on Anderson and pinned English to retain the titles.

Next, Baron Corbin faced Dolph Ziggler. In the end, Corbin executed the End of Days on Ziggler for the win.

After that, WWE Women's Champion Charlotte and Dana Brooke faced Natalya and Becky Lynch. The end came when Charlotte executed a Natural Selection on Natalya to win the match. After the match, Lynch tried to console Natalya, who responded by attacking Lynch, thus turning heel.

In the fourth match, Apollo Crews fought Sheamus. In the end, Sheamus executed White Noise off the top rope for a near-fall. Crews pinned Sheamus with a Crucifix pin for the win.

In the fifth match, AJ Styles faced John Cena. During the match, Cena performed an Attitude Adjustment on Styles for a nearfall. Styles performed a Styles Clash on Cena for a nearfall. Styles applied the Calf Crusher on Cena and Cena applied the STF on Styles, however, neither man submitted. In the end, as Cena was about to execute a second Attitude Adjustment on Styles, Cena accidentally incapacitated the referee. Styles' teammates, Karl Anderson and Luke Gallows, interfered, executed a Magic Killer on Cena and placed Styles on top of him. The referee, who had not witnessed anything, recovered and counted the pinfall, thus Styles won the match.

Next was the Money in the Bank ladder match involving Dean Ambrose, Alberto Del Rio, Cesaro, Chris Jericho, Kevin Owens, and Sami Zayn. The ending saw Ambrose pull Owens into a ladder, knocking Owens onto a ladder bridged between another ladder and the ring corner, and unhooked the briefcase to win the match and the contract for a WWE World Heavyweight Championship title match.

In the seventh match, Rusev (with Lana) defended the United States Championship against Titus O'Neil. Rusev forced O'Neil to submit to the Accolade to retain the title.

=== Main event ===
In the main event, Roman Reigns defended the WWE World Heavyweight Championship against Seth Rollins. Reigns executed two Superman Punches on two separate occasions on Rollins for a nearfall. As Reigns attempted to spear Rollins outside the ring, Rollins moved out of the way and Reigns instead collided with barricade leading to medical personnel checking on Reigns. Back in the ring, Rollins attempted a Pedigree on Reigns, who responded with a Spear on Rollins. In the end, as Reigns attempted another Spear, Rollins countered with a Pedigree on Reigns for a near-fall. Rollins executed a second Pedigree on Reigns to win the title.

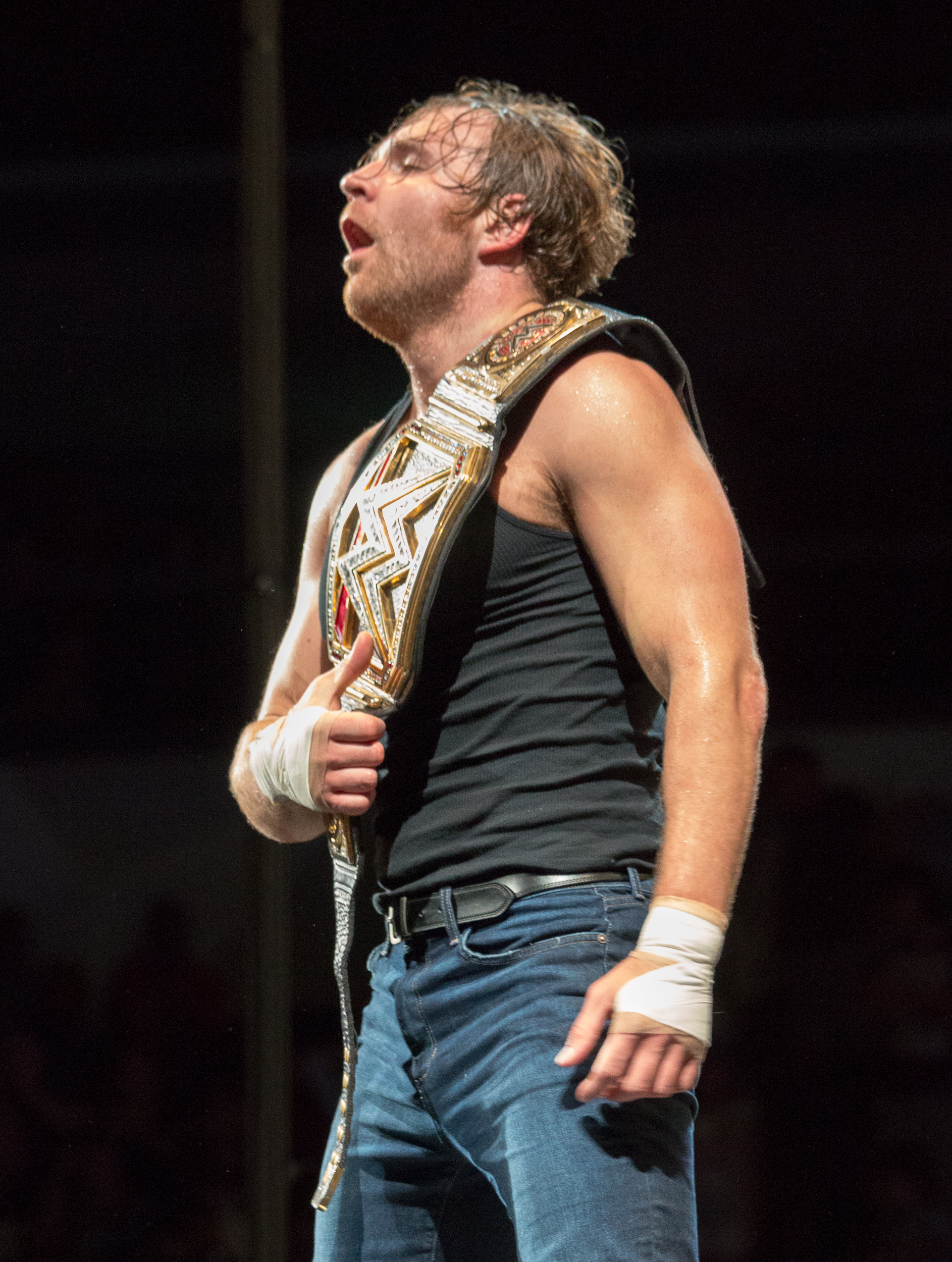
Dean Ambrose won the 2016 Money in the Bank ladder match and cashed in the contract later that same night to win the WWE World Heavyweight Championship.

After the match, Dean Ambrose's entrance theme began to play, Rollins anticipated that he would appear at on the entrance stage but instead Ambrose appeared behind Rollins and struck him with the Money in the Bank briefcase. Ambrose then cashed in his Money in the Bank contract and executed Dirty Deeds on Rollins to win the title. Ambrose's win meant that, at one point during the show, each member of The Shield was the WWE Champion.

== Reception ==
"Money in the Bank" had three matches praised by multiple reviewers (Cena-Styles, Reigns-Rollins, and the ladder match), although different reviewers found some faults with one or more of these matches. Meanwhile, the rest of the undercard was not as well received.

James Caldwell of Pro Wrestling Torch reviewed most of the event's matches, giving the Reigns-Rollins world title match 3.5 (out of 5) stars due to a "very strong second half after a sluggish first half with Reigns playing a heel throughout". Caldwell attributed Ambrose's title win to WWE needing "to do something after the 2.03 TV rating on Monday" for Raw, leading to "WWE switching the belt the one clear, 100 percent, Daniel Bryan-like babyface they have at the top of the card". Two of the event's matches were jointly best rated at 3.75 stars: Cena-Styles, "three-fourths of the way to an epic match that was hyped going into the PPV" but "Cena looked rusty"; as well as the ladder match, "very good" but with a predictable ending "since everyone got their shine while Ambrose was mainly in the background during the match". The rest of the matches on the pay-per-view broadcast were rated between 2.0 and 2.5 stars: the tag title match was "a bit of a mess"; "Ziggler made [Corbin] look good"; Lynch and Natalya should have gotten a "credibility-boosting victory since they always lose to Charlotte"; Crews's win was "unconvincing", and Rusev was repeating his 2014 storyline with the U.S. title.

Dave Meltzer of the Wrestling Observer deemed the first pre-show match a "nothing match" and the second pre-show match "normal". He opined that the tag title match drew the crowd into it but that the "execution was rough". Meltzer was negative on Corbin-Ziggler, which he called "too long", as the "feud has done Ziggler no favors" while "Corbin just doesn't show much of anything". The finish of Crews-Sheamus made him think "it's just the beginning between these two." The next two matches Meltzer deemed "excellent": Cena-Styles was about Styles being "the better wrestler than Cena, beating him at every turn but he couldn't finish him", while in the ladder match everyone (especially Cesaro) "took big ladder bumps but there was nothing really insane like used to be in such matches. Meltzer wrote the U.S. title match "was in the death spot" and "really had no chance with the crowd" despite Rusev and O'Neil having "worked hard in a physical match." The Reigns-Rollins match he called "flat at times because it went so long" and that Rollins was "not that over as a face" while "people just weren't into Reigns at all".

Jason Namako of WrestleView felt that Money in the Bank was "a damn good show" with a "phenomenal ending", including the Reigns-Rollins world title match, which was Namako's match of the night, followed by "the resurrection of Dean Ambrose as a player in this company", which he called "an amazing success". Ambrose was Namako's Most Valuable Player of the night, with his "insane" ladder match featuring "tremendous effort" by all six men involved. Another notable match was the tag title match, a "super-fun opener with a real hot, frenetic pace to it". Meanwhile, Corbin-Ziggler was "solid", Crews-Sheamus was "decent", and O'Neil and Rusev "did the best they could" in the "epitome of a cool-down match". However, Namako felt the show also had negatives: the "masterful performance" by Cena and Styles was "tarnished by timid booking" with an "unneeded cheap finish" which did not "help Styles in the slightest"; while the women's match was "run-of-the-mill" and "it unfortunately looks like we are right back where we started one year ago before the 'Divas Revolution' began".

Aaron Oster, writing for The Baltimore Sun, wrote that Ambrose's win of the ladder match was predictable, yet "the main event was anything but predictable". Oster attributed the television overrun of the show to two reasons: firstly viewers who were watching the Game 7 of the NBA Finals could watch the main event, and secondly "it kept fans guessing exactly when it would end". "Hypothetically, if things go as the WWE wants with Brock Lesnar returning to UFC", Oster speculated, "many more eyes than usual will be turning toward the company for the entire summer, and especially at Summerslam. To have Dean Ambrose be the champion when that is happening is a huge statement from the company that shows how much confidence that they have in him." For the other events, Oster felt it was "weird" to portray Crews as an "underdog" but that was still "better than having absolutely no direction with him." Meanwhile, "Rusev as a jerk heel, and not simply an anti-American heel, is really a fantastic thing." Oster also remarked that Golden Truth had fan support but doubted that WWE would "actually go anywhere with it."

== Aftermath ==
The day after Money in the Bank, Roman Reigns and Seth Rollins wrestled on Raw for a future shot at Dean Ambrose's world title, That match ended in a double count-out, so Ambrose agreed to face both men, and Shane McMahon arranged a triple threat world title match at Battleground. One week later on Raw on June 27, the WWE World Heavyweight Championship was shortened back to being called the WWE Championship. On June 21, two days after Money in the Bank, Roman Reigns was suspended for 30 days for violating WWE's Wellness Program, which uses drug testing to detect substance abuse. Pro Wrestling Torch and TheWrap reported that WWE knew of Reigns's violation before Money in the Bank, leading to Reigns being scripted to lose his world title at the event. WWE continued to advertise Reigns as part of the Battleground main event. In July, Ambrose successfully defended the title in two singles matches against Rollins on both Raw and SmackDown before Battleground. On July 19 during the 2016 WWE draft, Ambrose was drafted to SmackDown, bringing the WWE Championship with him, while Rollins and Reigns were drafted to Raw. On July 24 at Battleground, Ambrose defeated Rollins and Reigns by pinning the latter to retain the championship and keeping it on SmackDown.

The 2016 Money in the Bank was WWE's last PPV and livestreaming event to take place before WWE reintroduced the brand extension the following month, which again split WWE's main roster between the Raw and SmackDown brands where wrestlers were exclusively assigned to perform. The brand extension went into full effect on the July 25 episode of Raw. As such, after that year's SummerSlam, excluding WWE's "Big Four" PPVs (WrestleMania, SummerSlam, Royal Rumble, and Survivor Series), monthly PPVs became brand-exclusive, and the 2017 Money in the Bank was held exclusively for SmackDown.

== Results ==
No.	Results	Stipulations	Times
1^{P}	The Golden Truth (Goldust and R-Truth) defeated Breezango (Fandango and Tyler Breeze) by pinfall	Tag team match	05:06
2^{P}	The Lucha Dragons (Kalisto and Sin Cara) defeated The Dudley Boyz (Bubba Ray Dudley and D-Von Dudley) by pinfall	Tag team match	08:48
3	The New Day (Big E and Kofi Kingston) (c) (with Xavier Woods) defeated Enzo and Cass, Gallows and Anderson and The Vaudevillains (Aiden English and Simon Gotch) by pinfall	Fatal four-way tag team match for the WWE Tag Team Championship	11:43
4	Baron Corbin defeated Dolph Ziggler by pinfall	Singles match	12:25
5	Charlotte and Dana Brooke defeated Becky Lynch and Natalya by pinfall	Tag team match	07:00
6	Apollo Crews defeated Sheamus by pinfall	Singles match	08:36
7	AJ Styles defeated John Cena by pinfall	Singles match	24:10
8	Dean Ambrose defeated Alberto Del Rio, Cesaro, Chris Jericho, Kevin Owens, and Sami Zayn	Money in the Bank ladder match for a WWE World Heavyweight Championship match contract	21:38
9	Rusev (c) (with Lana) defeated Titus O'Neil by submission	Singles match for the WWE United States Championship	08:30
10	Seth Rollins defeated Roman Reigns (c) by pinfall	Singles match for the WWE World Heavyweight Championship	26:00
11	Dean Ambrose defeated Seth Rollins (c) by pinfall	Singles match for the WWE World Heavyweight Championship; This was Ambrose's Money in the Bank cash-in match.	00:09
(c) / – the champion(s) heading into the match; P / – the match was broadcast on the pre-show
