= WWE Money in the Bank =

WWE pay-per-view and livestreaming event series

- WWE Money in the Bank logo
- Created by: Chris Jericho; Vince McMahon; Brian Gewirtz
- Promotion: WWE
- Brands: Raw (2010–2011, 2018–present); SmackDown (2010–2011, 2017–present); 205 Live (2019)
- First event: 2010
- Signature match: Money in the Bank ladder match

WWE Money in the Bank is a professional wrestling event, produced annually since 2010 by the American company WWE, the world's largest professional wrestling promotion. The event is named after the Money in the Bank ladder match, a multi-person ladder match in which participants compete to obtain a briefcase that contains a contract for a championship match, which can be "cashed in" at a time and place of their choosing within the next year. The match originally only took place at WWE's flagship event, WrestleMania, from 2005 to 2010, after which, the match concept was spun off into its own event beginning in July that year with the match no longer occurring at WrestleMania. In addition to airing on traditional pay-per-view (PPV) since the inaugural 2010 event, the event has been available via livestreaming since the 2014 event. It has since become recognized as one of the company's five biggest annual events of the year, along with the Royal Rumble, WrestleMania, SummerSlam, and Survivor Series, referred to as the "Big Five".

From 2010 to 2013, the event occupied the July slot of WWE's event calendar before moving to June from 2014 to 2018. It was then held in May before returning to its original July slot in 2021 and then again in June in 2025, with the 2026 event to be held in October. The event was introduced during WWE's first brand extension period, and the events in 2010 and 2011 featured wrestlers from both the Raw and SmackDown brands. The first brand split then ended in August 2011. In mid-2016, the brand extension was reinstated and the 2017 event was held exclusively for SmackDown. However, following WrestleMania 34 in April 2018, brand-exclusive PPVs were discontinued. The 2023 event was held in London, England, thus making it the first to take place outside of the United States, with the 2024 event the first to be held in Canada. While the eponymous match was originally only for male wrestlers, the 2017 event featured the first-ever women's version and the events since have featured two matches, one each for the men and women.

== Concept and history ==
The "Money in the Bank" pay-per-view (PPV) and livestreaming event centers around a ladder match, the prize of which is a briefcase containing a contract for a championship match. The winner can then cash in the contract at a time and place of their choosing anytime within the next year – beginning the night they win the briefcase. If the contract is not used within that year, it is voided, but this has yet to happen. Only the holder of the Money in the Bank contract can be the one to cash-in the contract.

In 2005, World Wrestling Entertainment (WWE) established the Money in the Bank ladder match as an annual match at their marquee event, WrestleMania, debuting at WrestleMania 21. The idea for the match was conceptualized by then-WWE wrestler Chris Jericho and former WWE writer Brian Gewirtz. Following WrestleMania XXVI in March 2010, WWE established a separate Money in the Bank event, the concept of which is based around the match, which subsequently ceased being held at WrestleMania. The inaugural event was held on July 18, 2010, at the Sprint Center in Kansas City, Missouri.

In 2010 and 2011, the annual PPV included two Money in the Bank ladder matches. To coincide with the brand extension, one ladder match was for wrestlers from the Raw brand with a match contract for the brand's WWE Championship, while the other ladder match was for the SmackDown brand with a match contract for its World Heavyweight Championship (2002–2013 version). The brand split then ended in August 2011; although the brand split ended, the Money in the Bank events continued to have two ladder matches for match contracts for the respective titles. After the two titles were unified in December 2013, a championship match contract for the unified WWE World Heavyweight Championship became the prize of a single Money in the Bank ladder match. Also in 2014, the event moved to the June slot and it was also the first Money in the Bank event to air on WWE's streaming service, the WWE Network, in addition to traditional PPV outlets. The brand split returned after the 2016 event, with the 2017 event held exclusively for SmackDown. The championship match contract in the ladder match that year was for SmackDown's WWE Championship (formerly WWE World Heavyweight Championship). The 2017 event also featured the first-ever women's Money in the Bank ladder match with its contract being for a SmackDown Women's Championship match; each event since has featured a men's and women's match.

The 2017 event would be the only Money in the Bank event to be brand-exclusive, as following WrestleMania 34 in April 2018, brand-exclusive PPV and livestreaming events were discontinued, thus the events since have involved both the Raw and SmackDown brands. Beginning with the 2018 event, the ladder matches had eight participants evenly divided between the brands. The 2018 contracts granted the winners a championship match for their respective brand's world championship: the Universal Championship or WWE Championship, and the Raw Women's Championship or SmackDown Women's Championship. Beginning with the 2019 event, the winners could choose either brand's world championship. The 2019 event also moved Money in the Bank to the May slot in WWE's event calendar.

Due to the COVID-19 pandemic in 2020, that year's event saw the number of competitors in both matches decreased to six. Additionally, while the rules of the match itself remained the same, a new "Corporate Ladder" gimmick was also added to the matches, in which the participants had to travel from the ground floor of WWE Global Headquarters to the roof in order to reach the briefcases, which were suspended above a ring on the roof. Additionally for 2020, both the men's and women's matches took place at the same time. While the ladder matches were pre-recorded as cinematic matches, all of the other matches took place live from the WWE Performance Center in Orlando, Florida, with no fans in attendance. Additionally, the 2020 event was the first event to directly award a championship for winning the Money in the Bank ladder match; on the following night's episode of Raw, it was revealed that the women's ladder match had actually been for the Raw Women's Championship due to reigning champion Becky Lynch going on maternity leave.

In August 2020, WWE began holding Raw and SmackDown's shows in a bio-secure bubble called the WWE ThunderDome. In May 2021, the company announced that they would be leaving the ThunderDome and returning to live touring, beginning with the July 16 episode of SmackDown in Houston, Texas. The 2021 Money in the Bank was in turn announced to take place at Dickies Arena in Fort Worth, Texas, on July 18—returning the event to its original July slot—thus it was the first WWE PPV and livestreaming event held outside of Florida since Elimination Chamber on March 8, 2020, and the first PPV and livestreaming event held following the end of the ThunderDome Era. The 2021 event also reverted to the standard version of the titular ladder matches as well as returning to having eight competitors for both matches, evenly divided between the two brands. The 2021 event was also the first Money in the Bank to livestream on Peacock in the United States, following the merger of the American version of the WWE Network under Peacock in March that year.

The 2022 event was announced during the 2021 SummerSlam, which was held at the Allegiant Stadium in the Las Vegas suburb of Paradise, Nevada. Money in the Bank was initially announced to be held at the same venue on July 2, 2022, which would have marked the first time for a Money in the Bank event to be held in a National Football League stadium. However, on May 26, 2022, it was announced that the event had been moved to the nearby MGM Grand Garden Arena, although still on the same date, thus marking the first Money in the Bank to be held on a Saturday. While Money in the Bank had originally been established as one of WWE's monthly PPVs held between their "Big Four" shows (Royal Rumble, WrestleMania, SummerSlam, and Survivor Series), in August 2021, WWE President and Chief Revenue Officer Nick Khan referred to Money in the Bank as one of the company's "five annual tentpoles", subsequently elevating the event's status as one of WWE's five biggest events of the year, referred to as the "Big Five". The 2022 event also reduced the number of participants in the women's match to seven with an uneven division of wrestlers between the two brands—it featured four wrestlers from Raw and three from SmackDown; the men's match was originally announced with just seven, but during the event, it was expanded to eight participants, evenly divided between the two brands. Also beginning with the 2022 event, the winner can use the contract on any championship.

On January 5, 2023, WWE announced that the 2023 event would be held on Saturday, July 1 at The O2 Arena in London, England, marking the first Money in the Bank event held outside of the United States. This was also WWE's first major event held in London since Insurrextion in May 2002 and England in general since Insurrextion in June 2003. The 2023 women's ladder match had six participants divided evenly between the two brands, but the men's had seven, with three from Raw, three from SmackDown, and one non-exclusive wrestler participating. The 2024 event was the first Money in the Bank to be held in Canada, with it scheduled for Saturday, July 6 at the Scotiabank Arena in Toronto, Ontario. Both the men's and women's matches had six participants each, evenly divided between the two brands. The 2025 event, which moved the event back to June, scheduled for June 7 at the Intuit Dome in Inglewood, California, was the first Money in the Bank event to livestream on Netflix in most countries outside the United States following the WWE Network's merger under the service in those areas in January 2025. A select few territories still maintained the separate WWE Network due to pre-existing contracts but subsequently transferred to Netflix once those contracts expired in early 2026.

WrestleMania 42 was originally to be held in New Orleans, Louisiana in April 2026, but in May 2025, it was revealed that New Orleans would no longer be hosting the event. This came as part of a larger agreement with New Orleans, in which the city would host a future WrestleMania as well as the 2026 Money in the Bank. The date for Money in the Bank was originally announced for Saturday, August 29, 2026, but was delayed to Sunday, September 6, before being delayed again to Saturday, October 10. This marks the first Money in the Bank to be held in October, thus the latest scheduled in a calendar year. This will also be the first Money in the Bank to stream on the ESPN app in the United States, following the end of WWE's deal with Peacock.

== Theme songs ==
Money in the Bank is the only WWE event with a regular theme song. This is in stark contrast to WWE's other PPV and livestreaming events, which use songs sponsored by mainstream recording artists, which was the case with the first event using "Money" by I Fight Dragons. From 2011 to 2018, "Money in the Bank" by former in-house WWE composer Jim Johnston was used as the event's theme song. Before the advent of the event, Johnston's song was used as the entrance music for Donald Trump for his numerous guest appearances on WWE television. Starting in 2019, the theme song for the event was "Gotta Get That" (renamed to "Cash In" in 2023), written by WWE's current in-house composer def rebel. The only exceptions to this has been the 2024 event, with its theme song being "Tap" by NAV featuring Meek Mill, the first time since 2010 where the song was by a recording artist, and the 2026 event, with its theme song being "A Milli" by Lil Wayne.

== Events and winners ==
SmackDown-branded event

#	Event	Date	City	Venue	Main event	MITB winner(s)	Ref.
1	Money in the Bank (2010)	July 18, 2010	Kansas City, Missouri	Sprint Center	Sheamus (c) vs. John Cena in a Steel Cage match for the WWE Championship	Kane – Match contract for SmackDown's World Heavyweight Championship	
1	Money in the Bank (2010)	July 18, 2010	Kansas City, Missouri	Sprint Center	Sheamus (c) vs. John Cena in a Steel Cage match for the WWE Championship	The Miz – Match contract for Raw's WWE Championship	
2	Money in the Bank (2011)	July 17, 2011	Rosemont, Illinois	Allstate Arena	John Cena (c) vs. CM Punk for the WWE Championship	Daniel Bryan – Match contract for SmackDown's World Heavyweight Championship	
2	Money in the Bank (2011)	July 17, 2011	Rosemont, Illinois	Allstate Arena	John Cena (c) vs. CM Punk for the WWE Championship	Alberto Del Rio – Match contract for Raw's WWE Championship	
3	Money in the Bank (2012)	July 15, 2012	Phoenix, Arizona	US Airways Center	Big Show vs. Chris Jericho vs. John Cena vs. Kane vs. The Miz in a Money in the Bank ladder match for a WWE Championship match contract	Dolph Ziggler – World Heavyweight Championship match contract	
3	Money in the Bank (2012)	July 15, 2012	Phoenix, Arizona	US Airways Center	Big Show vs. Chris Jericho vs. John Cena vs. Kane vs. The Miz in a Money in the Bank ladder match for a WWE Championship match contract	John Cena – WWE Championship match contract	
4	Money in the Bank (2013)	July 14, 2013	Philadelphia, Pennsylvania	Wells Fargo Center	Christian vs. CM Punk vs. Daniel Bryan vs. Randy Orton vs. Rob Van Dam vs. Sheamus in a Money in the Bank ladder match for a WWE Championship match contract	Damien Sandow – World Heavyweight Championship match contract	
4	Money in the Bank (2013)	July 14, 2013	Philadelphia, Pennsylvania	Wells Fargo Center	Christian vs. CM Punk vs. Daniel Bryan vs. Randy Orton vs. Rob Van Dam vs. Sheamus in a Money in the Bank ladder match for a WWE Championship match contract	Randy Orton – WWE Championship match contract	
5	Money in the Bank (2014)	June 29, 2014	Boston, Massachusetts	TD Garden	Alberto Del Rio vs. Bray Wyatt vs. Cesaro vs. John Cena vs. Kane vs. Randy Orton vs. Roman Reigns vs. Sheamus in a Ladder match for the vacant WWE World Heavyweight Championship	Seth Rollins (Note: In December 2013, the WWE Championship and World Heavyweight Championship were unified, retiring the World Heavyweight Championship while the WWE Championship became known as the WWE World Heavyweight Championship. The 2014, 2015, and 2016 events featured only one Money in the Bank ladder match with its contract being for a match for the unified title (which reverted to being called the WWE Championship after the 2016 event when the brand split was reintroduced).)	
6	Money in the Bank (2015)	June 14, 2015	Columbus, Ohio	Nationwide Arena	Seth Rollins (c) vs. Dean Ambrose in a Ladder match for the WWE World Heavyweight Championship	Sheamus	
7	Money in the Bank (2016)	June 19, 2016	Paradise, Nevada	T-Mobile Arena	Roman Reigns (c) vs. Seth Rollins for the WWE World Heavyweight Championship, then Seth Rollins (c) vs. Dean Ambrose in Ambrose's Money in the Bank cash-in match	Dean Ambrose	
8	Money in the Bank (2017)	June 18, 2017	St. Louis, Missouri	Scottrade Center	AJ Styles vs. Baron Corbin vs. Dolph Ziggler vs. Kevin Owens vs. Sami Zayn vs. Shinsuke Nakamura in a Money in the Bank ladder match for a WWE Championship match contract	Carmella (Note: James Ellsworth retrieved the briefcase for Carmella. On the following episode of SmackDown Live, Carmella was forced to relinquish the briefcase and a rematch was scheduled for the June 27 episode with Ellsworth banned from ringside, where Carmella definitively won the match.) – WWE SmackDown Women's Championship match contract	
8	Money in the Bank (2017)	June 18, 2017	St. Louis, Missouri	Scottrade Center	AJ Styles vs. Baron Corbin vs. Dolph Ziggler vs. Kevin Owens vs. Sami Zayn vs. Shinsuke Nakamura in a Money in the Bank ladder match for a WWE Championship match contract	Baron Corbin – WWE Championship match contract	
9	Money in the Bank (2018)	June 17, 2018	Rosemont, Illinois	Allstate Arena	Braun Strowman vs. Bobby Roode vs. Finn Bálor vs. Kevin Owens vs. Kofi Kingston vs. Rusev vs. Samoa Joe vs. The Miz in a Money in the Bank ladder match for a world championship match contract of the winner's brand	Alexa Bliss – Women's championship match contract of the winner's brand	
9	Money in the Bank (2018)	June 17, 2018	Rosemont, Illinois	Allstate Arena	Braun Strowman vs. Bobby Roode vs. Finn Bálor vs. Kevin Owens vs. Kofi Kingston vs. Rusev vs. Samoa Joe vs. The Miz in a Money in the Bank ladder match for a world championship match contract of the winner's brand	Braun Strowman – World championship match contract of the winner's brand	
10	Money in the Bank (2019)	May 19, 2019	Hartford, Connecticut	XL Center	Ali vs. Andrade vs. Baron Corbin vs. Brock Lesnar vs. Drew McIntyre vs. Finn Bálor vs. Randy Orton vs. Ricochet in a Money in the Bank ladder match for a world championship match contract	Bayley – Women's championship match contract	
10	Money in the Bank (2019)	May 19, 2019	Hartford, Connecticut	XL Center	Ali vs. Andrade vs. Baron Corbin vs. Brock Lesnar vs. Drew McIntyre vs. Finn Bálor vs. Randy Orton vs. Ricochet in a Money in the Bank ladder match for a world championship match contract	Brock Lesnar – World championship match contract	
11	Money in the Bank (2020)	May 10, 2020	Orlando, Florida (Note: The majority of the event took place live at the WWE Performance Center in Orlando, Florida, while the Money in the Bank ladder matches were pre-recorded on April 15, 2020, at WWE's global headquarters in Stamford, Connecticut.) (Note: The event was originally scheduled to be held at the Royal Farms Arena in Baltimore, Maryland.)	WWE Performance Center	Asuka vs. Carmella vs. Dana Brooke vs. Lacey Evans vs. Nia Jax vs. Shayna Baszler in a Money in the Bank ladder match for the WWE Raw Women's Championship (Note: The match was originally announced with its original rules in that the winner would receive a women's championship match contract, however, on the May 11, 2020 episode of Raw, Raw Women's Champion Becky Lynch announced she was going on maternity leave and that the ladder match had actually been for the Raw Women's Championship instead of a championship match contract.) and (Note: Both the men's and women's matches took place at the same time, although the women's match concluded first.); AJ Styles vs. Aleister Black vs. Daniel Bryan vs. King Corbin vs. Otis vs. Rey Mysterio in a Money in the Bank ladder match for a world championship match contract	Asuka – Raw Women's Championship	
11	Money in the Bank (2020)	May 10, 2020	Stamford, Connecticut	WWE Global Headquarters	Asuka vs. Carmella vs. Dana Brooke vs. Lacey Evans vs. Nia Jax vs. Shayna Baszler in a Money in the Bank ladder match for the WWE Raw Women's Championship and AJ Styles vs. Aleister Black vs. Daniel Bryan vs. King Corbin vs. Otis vs. Rey Mysterio in a Money in the Bank ladder match for a world championship match contract	Otis – World championship match contract	
12	Money in the Bank (2021)	July 18, 2021	Fort Worth, Texas	Dickies Arena	Roman Reigns (c) vs. Edge for the WWE Universal Championship	Nikki A.S.H. – Women's championship match contract	
12	Money in the Bank (2021)	July 18, 2021	Fort Worth, Texas	Dickies Arena	Roman Reigns (c) vs. Edge for the WWE Universal Championship	Big E – World championship match contract	
13	Money in the Bank (2022)	July 2, 2022	Paradise, Nevada	MGM Grand Garden Arena	Drew McIntyre vs. Madcap Moss vs. Omos vs. Riddle vs. Sami Zayn vs. Seth "Freakin" Rollins vs. Sheamus vs. Theory in a Money in the Bank ladder match for a men's championship match contract	Liv Morgan – Women's championship match contract	
13	Money in the Bank (2022)	July 2, 2022	Paradise, Nevada	MGM Grand Garden Arena	Drew McIntyre vs. Madcap Moss vs. Omos vs. Riddle vs. Sami Zayn vs. Seth "Freakin" Rollins vs. Sheamus vs. Theory in a Money in the Bank ladder match for a men's championship match contract	Theory – Men's championship match contract	
14	Money in the Bank (2023)	July 1, 2023	London, England	The O_{2} Arena	The Bloodline (Roman Reigns and Solo Sikoa) vs. The Usos (Jey Uso and Jimmy Uso)	Damian Priest – Men's championship match contract	
14	Money in the Bank (2023)	July 1, 2023	London, England	The O_{2} Arena	The Bloodline (Roman Reigns and Solo Sikoa) vs. The Usos (Jey Uso and Jimmy Uso)	Iyo Sky – Women's championship match contract	
15	Money in the Bank (2024)	July 6, 2024	Toronto, Ontario, Canada	Scotiabank Arena	Cody Rhodes, Randy Orton, and Kevin Owens vs. The Bloodline (Solo Sikoa, Tama Tonga, and Jacob Fatu)	Drew McIntyre – Men's championship match contract	
15	Money in the Bank (2024)	July 6, 2024	Toronto, Ontario, Canada	Scotiabank Arena	Cody Rhodes, Randy Orton, and Kevin Owens vs. The Bloodline (Solo Sikoa, Tama Tonga, and Jacob Fatu)	Tiffany Stratton – Women's championship match contract	
16	Money in the Bank (2025)	June 7, 2025	Inglewood, California	Intuit Dome	Cody Rhodes and Jey Uso vs. John Cena and Logan Paul	Naomi – Women's championship match contract	
16	Money in the Bank (2025)	June 7, 2025	Inglewood, California	Intuit Dome	Cody Rhodes and Jey Uso vs. John Cena and Logan Paul	Seth Rollins – Men's championship match contract	
17	Money in the Bank (2026)	October 10, 2026	New Orleans, Louisiana	Smoothie King Center	Bron Breakker vs. Je'Von Evans vs. Trick Williams vs. Penta vs. CM Punk vs. Kevin Owens for a men's championship match contract	Tiffany Stratton – Women's championship match contract	
17	Money in the Bank (2026)	October 10, 2026	New Orleans, Louisiana	Smoothie King Center	Bron Breakker vs. Je'Von Evans vs. Trick Williams vs. Penta vs. CM Punk vs. Kevin Owens for a men's championship match contract	Penta – Men's championship match contract	
(c) – refers to the champion(s) heading into the match
