= Money in the Bank (2014) =

WWE pay-per-view and livestreaming event

- Promotional poster featuring various WWE wrestlers
- Promotion: WWE
- Date: June 29, 2014
- City: Boston, Massachusetts
- Venue: TD Garden
- Attendance: 15,653
- Buy rate: 122,000

WWE event chronology
← Previous; Payback	Next → Battleground

Money in the Bank chronology
← Previous; 2013	Next → 2015

The 2014 Money in the Bank was a professional wrestling pay-per-view (PPV) and livestreaming event produced by WWE. It was the fifth annual Money in the Bank event and took place on June 29, 2014, at the TD Garden in Boston, Massachusetts. The event centered on the men's Money in the Bank ladder match, a multi-person ladder match where the wrestlers compete to retrieve a briefcase hanging above the ring which contains a contract for a guaranteed world championship match at any time within the next year.

Eight matches took place at the event. The main event was an eight-man ladder match for the vacant WWE World Heavyweight Championship, which was won by John Cena. This was the first Money in the Bank event to only host one Money in the Bank ladder match, which was won by Seth Rollins. This was due to the unification of the previous World Heavyweight Championship and the WWE Championship in December 2013, with the former being retired and the latter becoming the WWE World Heavyweight Championship, with the titular ladder match granting a championship match contract for the unified title.

This was the first Money in the Bank event to livestream on the WWE Network, which launched in February, and it was the first time for the event to be held in June as all previous events were held in July. The event received 122,000 pay-per-view buys (excluding WWE Network views), down from the previous year's 199,000 buys. The event is notable for the first WWE appearance of independent wrestler and future Money in the Bank winner, Luis Martinez, who would later sign with the company in 2018 as Damian Priest.

== Production ==
=== Background ===
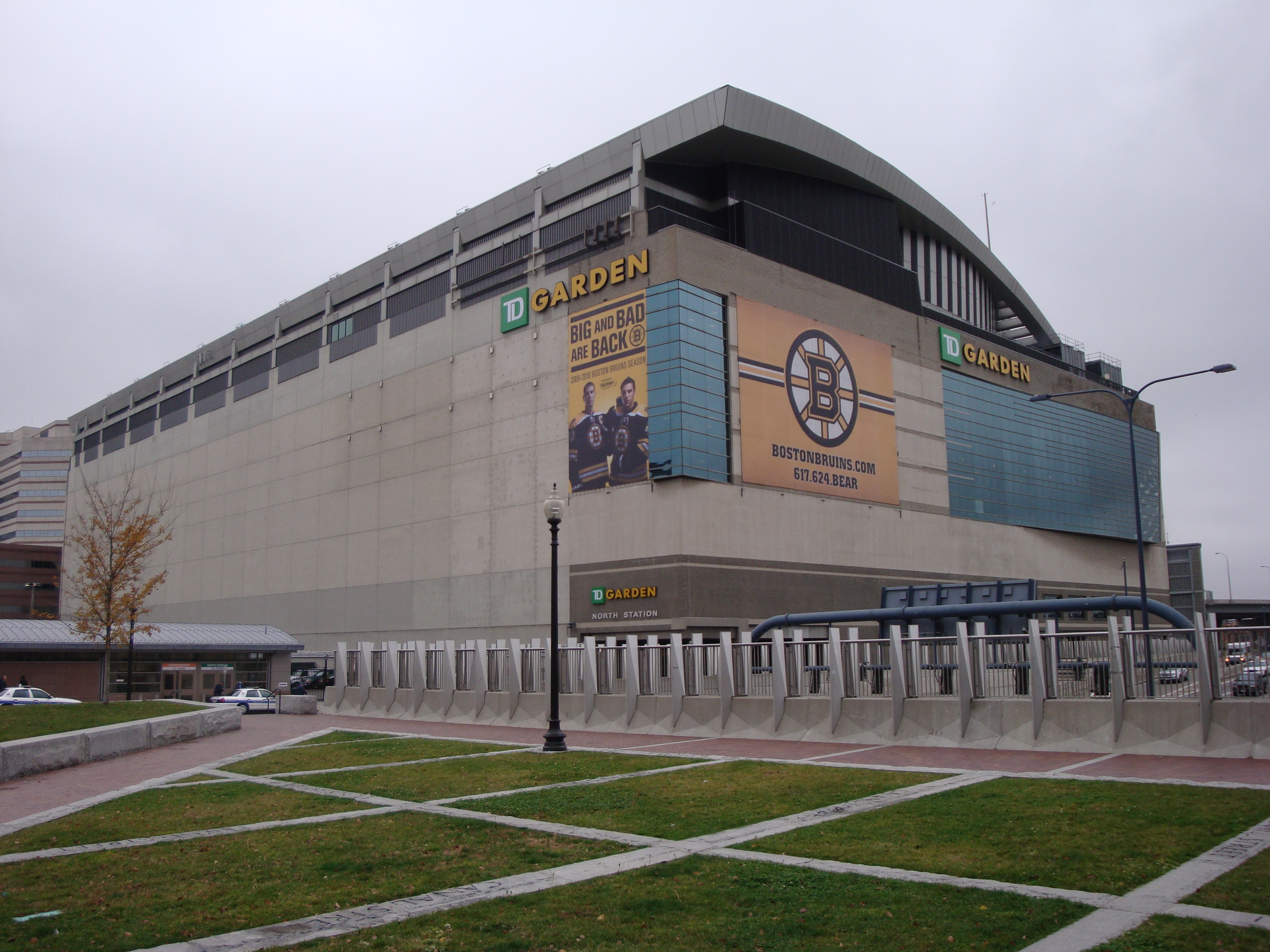
The fifth annual Money in the Bank event was held at the TD Garden in Boston, Massachusetts.

Money in the Bank is an annual professional wrestling pay-per-view (PPV) event produced by WWE since 2010, originally held in July. The concept of the event comes from WWE's established Money in the Bank ladder match. The fifth Money in the Bank event was scheduled for June 29, 2014, at the TD Garden in Boston, Massachusetts. This was the first Money in the Bank held in June as the previous events were all held in July. In addition to traditional pay-per-view outlets, this was the first Money in the Bank event to livestream on the WWE Network, which launched in February.

The Money in the Bank ladder match features multiple wrestlers using ladders to retrieve a briefcase hanging above the ring. The briefcase contains a contract that guarantees the winner a match for a world championship at any time within the next year. Previously, there were two such ladder matches contested at the annual event, with one granting a WWE Championship match contract while the other awarded a World Heavyweight Championship match contract. As a result of the unification of the World Heavyweight Championship and the WWE Championship at TLC: Tables, Ladders & Chairs in December 2013, with the former being retired and the latter becoming the WWE World Heavyweight Championship, the 2014 event only had one Money in the Bank ladder match which granted a title match for the unified championship.

=== Storylines ===
The card consisted of eight matches that resulted from scripted storylines. Results were predetermined by WWE's writers, while storylines were produced on WWE's weekly television shows, Raw and SmackDown.

On the June 2 episode of Raw, Alberto Del Rio qualified for the Money in the Bank ladder match by defeating Dolph Ziggler. The following week, following Daniel Bryan being stripped of his WWE World Heavyweight Championship due to injury, Stephanie McMahon changed the match into a ladder match for the vacant title. The same night, Triple H placed Randy Orton into the match, while United States Champion Sheamus and Cesaro defeated Intercontinental Champion Bad News Barrett and Rob Van Dam, respectively, to qualify. On the June 13 episode of SmackDown, Bray Wyatt qualified for the match after defeating Dean Ambrose (with interference from Seth Rollins). On the June 16 episode of Raw, John Cena won a spot in the match by defeating Kane in a stretcher match, and Roman Reigns qualified for the match by winning a 19-man battle royal. On the June 23 episode of Raw, Kane was added to the match by Triple H.

During the feud between John Cena and Bray Wyatt, WWE Tag Team Champions The Usos (Jey Uso and Jimmy Uso) inserted themselves in the rivalry alongside Cena to counteract Wyatt Family members Luke Harper and Erick Rowan. At Payback, The Usos were once again be in Cena's corner to even the odds and in the process, Cena defeated Bray Wyatt in a Last Man Standing match to end the feud. The next night on Raw, Rowan and Harper shifted their attention to The Usos, defeating the latter in a non-title tag team match on the June 2 episode of Raw. Due to this win, they earned a match for the Tag Team Championship at the pay-per-view.

On the June 17 episode of Main Event, a Money in the Bank ladder match was added to the event, with Seth Rollins declaring himself the first participant in the match. On the June 23 episode of Raw, Triple H added Intercontinental Champion Bad News Barrett, Dolph Ziggler, Rob Van Dam, Kofi Kingston, and Jack Swagger to the match. Later that night (after Dean Ambrose threatened to disrupt the pay-per-view), Rollins requested Ambrose be added to the match, to which Triple H agreed. On the June 27 episode of SmackDown, Barrett suffered an injury, causing him to be removed from the match.

At Payback, after a loss to RybAxel (Ryback and Curtis Axel), Cody Rhodes told his brother, Goldust, that he deserved a better partner than him. Following Payback, Goldust was unsuccessful in defeating RybAxel with his new partners, chosen for him by Cody. On the June 16 episode of Raw, Cody debuted as his new moniker of Stardust, and began teaming with his brother to defeat the team RybAxel. On the June 24 episode of Main Event, Rybaxel challenged Stardust and Goldust to a match at Money in the Bank, which they accepted.

On the June 17 episode of Main Event, Naomi defeated WWE Divas Champion Paige in a non-title match, setting up a title match between the two at Money in the Bank.

After Fandango had replaced his dance partner Summer Rae with Layla, Summer Rae attacked Layla on the May 19 episode of Raw. They continued to attack each other and interfere in Fandango's matches, thus setting up a match at Money in the Bank, with Fandango as the special guest referee.

Since his debut, Rusev was presented as a Russian super athlete. His manager, Lana, insulted the United States many times. This included an attack on WWE Hall of Famer Jim Duggan, known for his patriotic gimmick, who was saved by Big E. Big E and Rusev had a match at Payback, but Big E was defeated by Rusev. After the event, they continued to attack each other, setting up a rematch at Money in the Bank.

== Event ==
Other on-screen personnel
Role:	Name:
English Commentators	Michael Cole
English Commentators	Jerry Lawler
English Commentators	John "Bradshaw" Layfield
Ring announcer	Justin Roberts
Interviewers	Michael Cole
Interviewers	Byron Saxton
Interviewers	Tom Phillips
Referees	John Cone
Referees	Charles Robinson
Referees	Chad Patton
Referees	Fandango (Layla vs. Rae)
Pre-show panel	Renee Young
Pre-show panel	Booker T
Pre-show panel	Christian
Pre-show panel	Alex Riley

=== Pre-show ===
During the Money in the Bank Kickoff pre-show, Daniel Bryan came out to speak about his health and being stripped of the WWE World Heavyweight Championship. The former champion led the Boston fans in an echoing "Yes!" chant and said that his recovery was going poorly and that he didn't know when he'd be back. He promised to return better than ever and to win back his title. Bo Dallas entered the ring to try to cheer Bryan up. Bryan called Dallas a "Bo-ner" then mocked his "Bo-lieve" catchphrase, telling him "Bo-leave" before leading another round of chants.

=== Preliminary matches ===
The actual pay-per-view opened with The Usos defending the WWE Tag Team Championship against The Wyatt Family's Luke Harper and Erick Rowan. In the end, Jimmy and Jey executed a double Superplex on Rowan. Jey performed a Samoan Splash on Rowan, which was followed by Jimmy performing a Samoan Splash on Rowan to retain the titles.

Next, Paige defended the WWE Divas Championship against Naomi. The match ended when Paige executed a RamPaige on Naomi to retain the title.

After that, Damien Sandow took on Adam Rose. Rose performed a Party Foul on Sandow to win the match.

The next match was the Money in the Bank ladder match for a WWE World Heavyweight Championship match contract, involving Kofi Kingston, Jack Swagger, Rob Van Dam, Dolph Ziggler, Dean Ambrose and Seth Rollins. During the match, Ambrose pushed a ladder, causing Kingston to fall off the top rope onto Swagger, Ziggler and Van Dam. Van Dam executed a Rolling Thunder Senton on Rollins, who was lay on a ladder wedged in the ring corner. Swagger performed a Powerbomb off a ladder on Van Dam, which was followed by Ambrose performing a Suplex off the ladder on Rollins. Ambrose injured his shoulder, leading to him being taken backstage by medical personnel. Kingston performed a Back Body Drop on Rollins atop a ladder, causing Rollins to fall onto another ladder bridged between the ladder and the ropes. Ziggler executed a Zig Zag onto a ladder on Kingston. Ziggler attempted to retrieve the briefcase but Rollins hit Ziggler with a chair. Rollins attempted to retrieve the briefcase but Ambrose came back out and hit Rollins with the chair. Ambrose attempted to retrieve the briefcase but Kane came down to the ring and executed a Chokeslam and a Tombstone Piledriver on Ambrose. Rollins retrieved the briefcase to win the match.

Next, Gold and Stardust faced Ryback and Curtis Axel. In the end, Stardust pinned Ryback with a roll-up to win the match.

After that, Rusev wrestled Big E. Rusev forced Big E to submit to The Accolade to win the match.

In the penultimate match, Summer Rae faced Layla with Fandango as the special guest referee. Layla performed a Roundhouse Kick on Rae to win the match.

=== Main event ===
The main event was a ladder match for the vacant WWE World Heavyweight Championship involving Alberto Del Rio, Bray Wyatt, Cesaro, John Cena, Kane, Randy Orton, Roman Reigns, and United States Champion Sheamus. During the match, Cesaro and Sheamus fought atop the ladder but Wyatt pushed the ladder, causing Cesaro and Sheamus to hang onto the championship belts. Orton executed an Elevated DDT off a ladder bridged between the apron and a broadcast table on Sheamus. After everyone fought each other off, Sheamus controlled the match by performing a Diving Shoulder Block on Kane, an Irish Curse Backbreaker on Del Rio, White Noise on Orton and a Brogue Kick on Cena. After Orton and Kane removed the other participants from the ring, Reigns controlled the match by performing a Spear on Kane, Superman Punches on Orton and Sheamus, Running Front Dropkicks on Del Rio, who was draped on the bottom rope, and Wyatt, who was draped on a broadcast table, and a Spear on Cesaro. Reigns fought with Cena, ending by executing a Spear on Cena. After each men executed their finishers on the other participants, Reigns fought with Orton and attempted to retrieve the championship belts but Kane performed a Chokeslam on Reigns. Orton attempted to retrieve the championship belts but Cena executed an Attitude Adjustment on Kane and an Attitude Adjustment on Orton onto Kane. After that, Cena retrieved the championship belts to win the match and become the new champion.

== Reception ==
The event received generally positive reviews. James Caldwell of Pro Wrestling Torch described the Money in the Bank Ladder match as an "excellent MITB ladder match that had a little bit of everything", focusing in the Ambrose-Rollins feud and gave it 4.25 stars out of 5. Also, he compared the Money in the Bank match and the WWE World Heavyweight Championship ladder match and said that "not as good as the similar MITB ladder match, as there were too many wrestlers in the match, the middle really dragged, and this felt more disorganized and cluttered than the nicely-structured previous match." Caldwell felt it was the "right decision for Cena to win" to set up his match with Brock Lesnar at SummerSlam in two months. He gave the main event 3 stars out of 5.

Dave Scherer of PWInsider criticized the decision to crown John Cena as champion. According to him, he "hated the result" and "it's the wrong decision and I think the crowd was very representative of how many fans felt tonight as they cheered for a lot of new talent and groaned at a lot of the older talent". Also, he liked the opener, the Money in the Bank ladder match and the Rusev vs. Big E match.

Dave Meltzer of the Wrestling Observer Newsletter gave the Money in the Bank ladder match 4.5 stars out of 5 while the WWE World Heavyweight Championship ladder match was given 4 stars out of 5.

== Aftermath ==
Randy Orton received medical assistance after the event. He received 11 staples to close the gash in his head suffered during the main event of Money in the Bank.

The following night on Raw, The Authority held a mock celebration for the new WWE World Heavyweight Champion John Cena and revealed he would be featured on the cover of the WWE 2K15 video game, but Cena made it clear that he would not allow The Authority to control him. Triple H then scheduled a fatal four-way match for the WWE World Heavyweight Championship at Battleground between Cena, Orton, Kane, and Reigns. In a tag team match between those four superstars later in the night, Seth Rollins attempted to cash in his briefcase against an assaulted Cena for his championship, but was stopped by Dean Ambrose, who earlier in the show declared that he would be there to stop Rollins from cashing in his briefcase successfully.

Also on Raw, AJ Lee returned and defeated Paige for the Divas Championship. A rematch between the two for the title was later scheduled for Battleground.

Bad News Barrett, who had been removed from the Money in the Bank ladder match due to injury, was also stripped of his Intercontinental Championship. A battle royal for the vacant championship, scheduled for Battleground, was won by The Miz.

Brock Lesnar returned on July 21 and proceeded to defeat John Cena at SummerSlam to capture the WWE World Heavyweight Championship. At WrestleMania 31, on March 29, 2015, Seth Rollins successfully cashed in his Money in the Bank contract during Lesnar and Royal Rumble winner Roman Reigns' match, making it into a triple threat match, which Rollins won by pinning Reigns to win the WWE World Heavyweight Championship. However, Rollins vacated the title on November 4, 2015, after suffering multiple knee injuries at a live event in Dublin, Ireland, ending his reign at 220 days.

== Results ==
No.	Results	Stipulations	Times
1	The Usos (Jey Uso and Jimmy Uso) (c) defeated The Wyatt Family (Erick Rowan and Luke Harper) by pinfall	Tag team match for the WWE Tag Team Championship	13:13
2	Paige (c) defeated Naomi (with Cameron) by pinfall	Singles match for the WWE Divas Championship	07:10
3	Adam Rose defeated Damien Sandow by pinfall	Singles match	04:13
4	Seth Rollins defeated Dean Ambrose, Dolph Ziggler, Jack Swagger (with Zeb Colter), Kofi Kingston, and Rob Van Dam	Money in the Bank ladder match for a WWE World Heavyweight Championship match contract	23:14
5	Goldust and Stardust defeated RybAxel (Curtis Axel and Ryback) by pinfall	Tag team match	07:45
6	Rusev (with Lana) defeated Big E by submission	Singles match	07:17
7	Layla defeated Summer Rae by pinfall	Singles match Fandango served as the special guest referee.	03:45
8	John Cena defeated Alberto Del Rio, Bray Wyatt, Cesaro (with Paul Heyman), Kane, Randy Orton, Roman Reigns, and Sheamus	Ladder match for the vacant WWE World Heavyweight Championship	26:30
(c) / – the champion(s) heading into the match
