= Money in the Bank (2022) =

WWE premium live event

- Promotional poster featuring Seth "Freakin" Rollins and Becky Lynch
- Promotion: WWE
- Brand(s): Raw; SmackDown
- Date: July 2, 2022
- City: Paradise, Nevada
- Venue: MGM Grand Garden Arena
- Attendance: 12,076

WWE event chronology
← Previous; Hell in a Cell	Next → SummerSlam

Money in the Bank chronology
← Previous; 2021	Next → 2023

The 2022 Money in the Bank was a professional wrestling premium live event (PLE) produced by WWE, held for wrestlers from the promotion's main roster brands, Raw and SmackDown. It was the 13th annual Money in the Bank event and took place on Saturday, July 2, 2022, at the MGM Grand Garden Arena in the Las Vegas suburb of Paradise, Nevada. The event centered on the Money in the Bank ladder match, a multi-person ladder match where the wrestlers compete to retrieve a briefcase hanging above the ring which contains a contract for a guaranteed championship match at any time within the next year.

Seven matches were contested at the event. In the main event, unannounced entrant Theory from Raw, who lost the brand's United States Championship to Bobby Lashley earlier in the night, won the men's Money in the Bank ladder match while Liv Morgan, also from Raw, won the women's ladder match in the opening bout. In other prominent matches, Ronda Rousey defeated Natalya to retain the SmackDown Women's Championship, after which, Morgan cashed in her Money in the Bank contract and defeated Rousey to win the championship, and The Usos (Jey Uso and Jimmy Uso) defeated The Street Profits (Angelo Dawkins and Montez Ford) to retain the Undisputed WWE Tag Team Championship.

The event was originally announced to be held at the city's Allegiant Stadium, with WWE elevating Money in the Bank to be regarded as one of the "Big Five" events of the year, alongside the traditional "Big Four" of the Royal Rumble, WrestleMania, SummerSlam, and Survivor Series. This was also the first Money in the Bank held on a Saturday and officially marked a change for WWE to primarily hold its PLEs on Saturdays instead of the traditional Sundays, with some exceptions, such as the two-night WrestleMania. It was also the first Money in the Bank event to livestream on Disney+ Hotstar in Indonesia, following the shutdown of its version of the WWE Network in late January, as well as the first Money in the Bank to be branded as a "premium live event", a term the company introduced at the start of the year to refer to its events airing on traditional pay-per-view and via WWE's livestreaming platforms. This was also WWE's final PLE to take place before WWE owner Vince McMahon, who had served as chairman and chief executive officer of the company since 1982, announced his retirement on July 22, although he returned in an executive role the following year.

== Production ==
=== Background ===
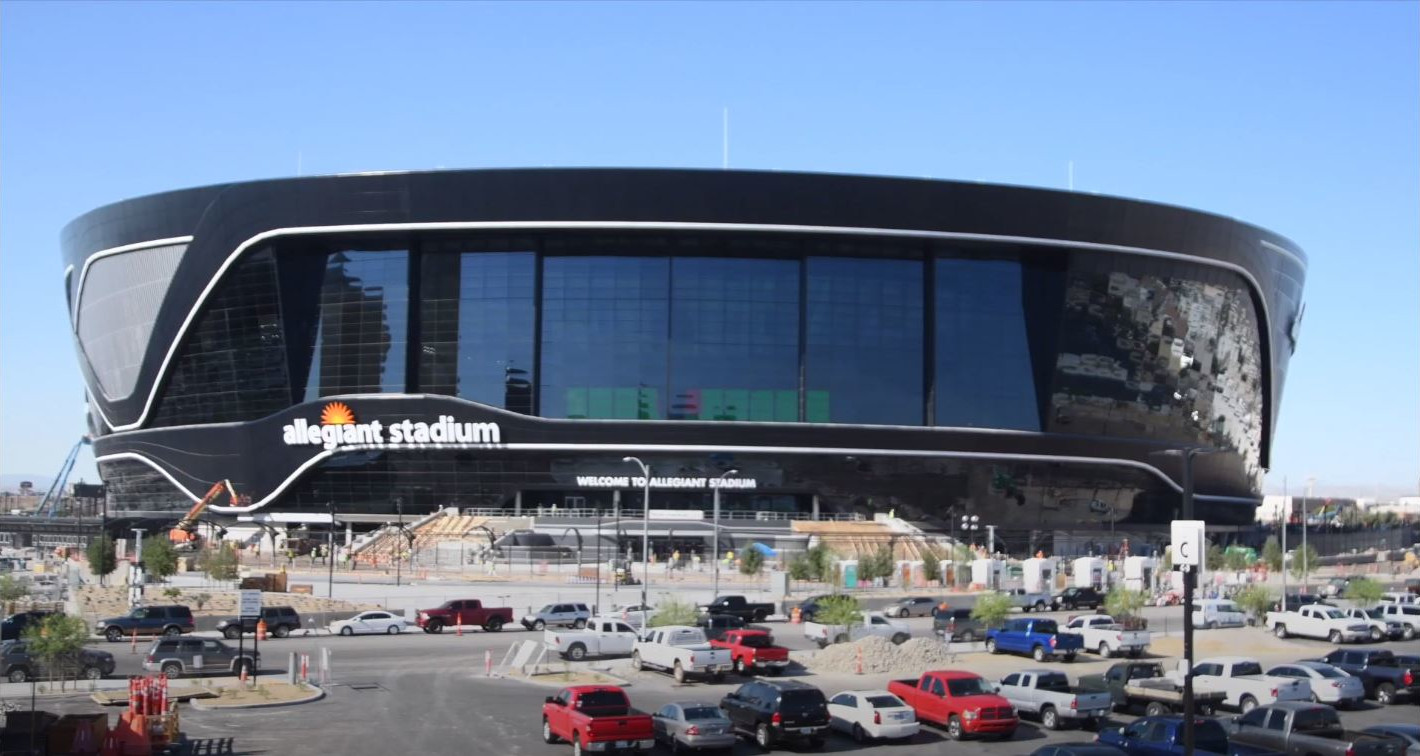
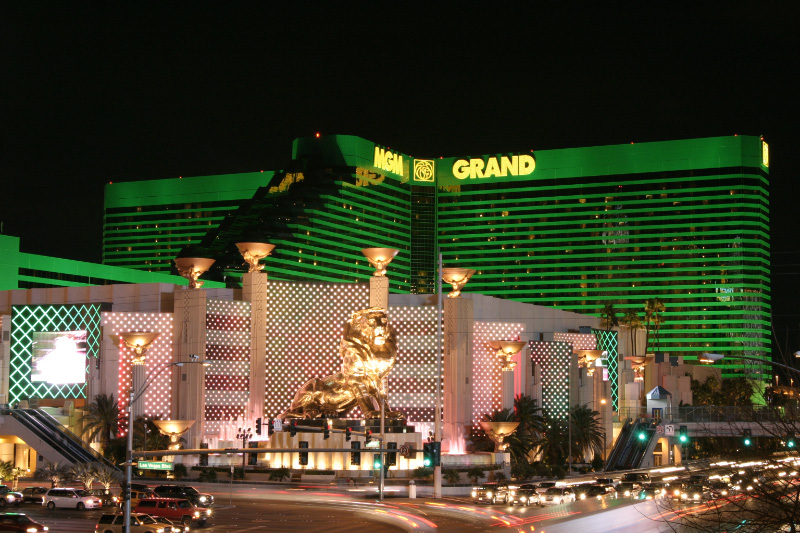
The 13th annual Money in the Bank event was originally planned to be held at Allegiant Stadium in the Las Vegas suburb of Paradise, Nevada, but instead took place at the city's MGM Grand Garden Arena within the MGM Grand resort.

Money in the Bank is an annual professional wrestling event produced by WWE since 2010, generally held between May and July. It was originally broadcast exclusively via pay-per-view (PPV) before it began simulcasting on WWE's livestreaming platforms in 2014. The concept of the event comes from WWE's established Money in the Bank ladder match.

The 13th Money in the Bank event was announced during SummerSlam on August 21, 2021, which was held at the Allegiant Stadium in the Las Vegas suburb of Paradise, Nevada. Money in the Bank was announced to be held at the same venue on Saturday, July 2, 2022, which would have marked the first time that a Money in the Bank event would have been held in a National Football League stadium. On May 26, 2022, however, it was announced that the event had been moved to the nearby MGM Grand Garden Arena with no change to the date, subsequently making it the first Money in the Bank to take place on a Saturday. Tickets originally purchased for Allegiant Stadium were refunded with those fans getting first access to purchase tickets for MGM Grand on June 1 before tickets went on sale to the general public on June 3. This was also the first Money in the Bank event to be branded as a "premium live event", a term the company introduced on January 1 to refer to its events that are available on PPV and via livestreaming.

The Money in the Bank ladder match features multiple wrestlers using ladders to retrieve a briefcase hanging above the ring. The briefcase contains a contract that guarantees the winner a match for a championship at any time within the next year. The 2022 event featured wrestlers from the Raw and SmackDown brand divisions; male wrestlers competed for a contract to grant them a match for a championship of their choosing, while female wrestlers competed for a Raw Women's Championship or SmackDown Women's Championship match contract. The 2022 event also reduced the number of participants in the women's match to seven with an uneven division of wrestlers between the Raw and SmackDown brand divisions—it featured four wrestlers from Raw and three from SmackDown; the men's match was originally announced with just seven, but during the event, it was expanded to eight participants, evenly divided between the two brands.

Money in the Bank had been established as one of WWE's monthly PLEs held between the "Big Four" (Royal Rumble, WrestleMania, SummerSlam, and Survivor Series). In August 2021, WWE President and Chief Revenue Officer, Nick Khan, referred to Money in the Bank as one of the company's "five annual tentpoles", thus elevating its status as one of WWE's five biggest events of the year, colloquially referred to as the "Big Five". On February 24, 2022, WWE announced a partnership with On Location, a company known for providing premium hospitality experiences for marquee events. Through the partnership, spectators had access to hospitality packages for WWE's biggest events. The 2022 Money in the Bank was WWE's first event to offer these premium hospitality packages. These ticket and travel packages included premier seating, premium hospitality offerings, and meet-and-greets with current WWE wrestlers and legends. Additionally, from June 30 through July 2, WWE had a dedicated Money in the Bank merchandise store at the MGM Grand.

Money in the Bank was held on the same night as UFC 276, which took place at the nearby T-Mobile Arena during its 10th International Fight Week, just as was the case with Manny Pacquiao vs. Yordenis Ugás that took place on the same night as the previous year's SummerSlam.

=== Broadcast outlets ===
The PLE was broadcast on traditional PPV outlets worldwide. It was also available to livestream on Peacock in the United States, SonyLIV in India, Disney+ Hotstar in Indonesia, and the WWE Network everywhere else. This was the first Money in the Bank to livestream on Disney+ Hotstar in Indonesia, following the shutdown of its version of the WWE Network in late January.

=== Storylines ===
The event included seven matches that resulted from scripted storylines. Results were predetermined by WWE's writers on the Raw and SmackDown brands, while storylines were produced on WWE's weekly television shows, Monday Night Raw and Friday Night SmackDown.

Qualifying matches for the men's Money in the Bank ladder match began on the June 10 episode of SmackDown. A qualifier between Drew McIntyre and Sheamus ended in a double disqualification after both men attacked each other with steel chairs, thus neither qualified. The following week, WWE official Adam Pearce announced that both McIntyre and Sheamus would be in the match. However, the following week, Roman Reigns's special counsel, Paul Heyman, convinced the WWE Board of Directors to remove McIntyre and Sheamus from the match, and Pearce said that they would qualify for the match if they defeated Undisputed WWE Tag Team Champions The Usos (Jey Uso and Jimmy Uso) in a non-title match, which they subsequently did. Seth "Freakin" Rollins became the first to qualify from Raw after he defeated AJ Styles on the June 13 episode of Raw. The following week, Omos and Sami Zayn became the fourth and fifth qualified entrant after defeating Riddle and Shinsuke Nakamura, respectively. The following week on Raw, Riddle won a Last Chance Battle Royal by last eliminating The Miz to be the sixth qualified entrant, while Madcap Moss won a fatal four-way match also involving Ezekiel, Happy Corbin, and The Miz on the July 1 episode of SmackDown to win the seventh and what was believed to be final spot in the match.

On the June 3 episode of SmackDown, Natalya won a six-pack challenge to become the number one contender for Ronda Rousey's SmackDown Women's Championship, while on the June 6 episode of Raw, Rhea Ripley won a fatal four-way match to determine the next contender for Bianca Belair's Raw Women's Championship. Both title matches were subsequently set for Money in the Bank. On the June 20 episode of Raw, it was revealed that Ripley was not medically cleared to compete at the event, and a new contender would be decided in a fatal five-way match, which was won by Carmella.

Qualifying matches for the women's Money in the Bank ladder match also began on the June 10 episode of SmackDown. Lacey Evans became the first qualified entrant by defeating Xia Li. The following week on Raw and SmackDown, Alexa Bliss and Liv Morgan defeated Doudrop and Nikki A.S.H. in a tag team qualifier to win two spots in the match, and Raquel Rodriguez defeated Shayna Baszler to earn the fourth spot in the match. The following week on Raw and SmackDown, Asuka and Shotzi became the fifth and sixth qualified entrants after defeating Becky Lynch and Tamina, respectively. The following week on Raw, Lynch won a Last Chance Elimination match by defeating Doudrop, Nikki A.S.H, Baszler, Tamina, and Li to become the last qualified entrant.

On the June 13 episode of Raw, United States Champion Theory and Bobby Lashley had a pose-down. Lashley originally won, but afterwards, Theory blinded him with baby oil and stood tall as the show ended. The following week, Theory had his pose-down, but it was interrupted by Lashley, who laid him out with a spear. Later that night, Lashley defeated Chad Gable, Otis, and Theory in a gauntlet match to become the number one contender for the U.S. title at Money in the Bank.

On the June 6 episode of Raw, The Street Profits (Angelo Dawkins and Montez Ford) defeated Undisputed WWE Tag Team Champions The Usos (Jey Uso and Jimmy Uso) via count-out in a Championship Contender's match to earn a title match at a future date. On June 17, the match was made official for Money in the Bank.

== Event ==
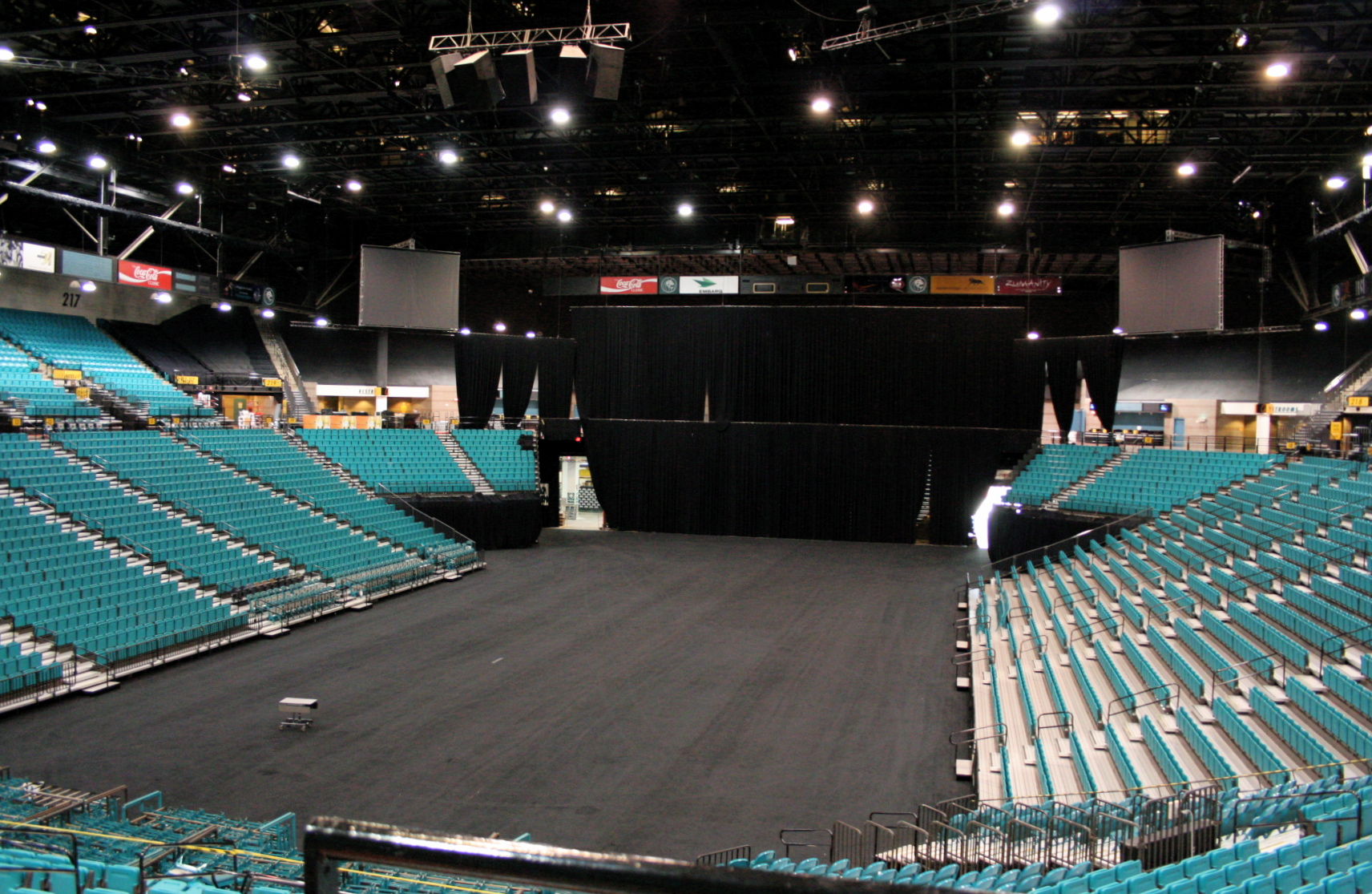
Inside the MGM Grand Garden Arena.

Other on-screen personnel
Role:	Name:
English commentators	Michael Cole (SmackDown)
English commentators	Pat McAfee (SmackDown)
English commentators	Jimmy Smith (Raw)
English commentators	Corey Graves (Raw)
English commentators	Byron Saxton (Raw)
Portuguese commentators	Maroc Alfaro
Portuguese commentators	Roberto Figueroa
Spanish commentator	Marcelo Rodriguez
Ring announcers	Mike Rome (Raw)
Ring announcers	Samantha Irvin (SmackDown)
Referees	Danilo Anfibio
Referees	Jason Ayers
Referees	Jessika Carr
Referees	Dan Engler
Referees	Daphanie LaShaunn
Referees	Eddie Orengo
Referees	Ryan Tran
Referees	Rod Zapata
Interviewer	Sarah Schreiber
Pre-show panel	Kayla Braxton
Pre-show panel	Kevin Patrick
Pre-show panel	John "Bradshaw" Layfield
Pre-show panel	Peter Rosenberg
Pre-show panel	Booker T

=== Preliminary matches ===
The PLE opened with the women's Money in the Bank ladder match, featuring Alexa Bliss, Asuka, Becky Lynch, and Liv Morgan from Raw and Lacey Evans, Raquel Rodriguez, and Shotzi from SmackDown. During the match, Rodriguez performed a double suplex on Lynch and Bliss atop a ladder. As Asuka ascended the ladder, she was thwarted by Evans, who also scaled the ladder. Lynch then tipped the ladder over, however, Asuka and Evans landed on their feet. Evans and Shotzi then scaled the ladder where Evans performed a women's right on Shotzi. Rodriguez and Morgan thwarted Evans' attempts. Morgan performed a sunset bomb on Evans off the ladder. Lynch, who was atop a ladder, climbed down and repositioned the ladder, giving Shotzi ample time to recover and pull Lynch down. Shotzi attempted a senton on Lynch, who was lying in the ring, but Lynch avoided it. Outside the ring, Rodriguez set up a ladder supported by the announce table and the ring. After tussling with Asuka at ringside, Lynch then kicked Rodriguez onto a ladder after which, Lynch climbed a ladder and performed a leg drop on Asuka, who was lying atop the ladder previously set up by Rodriguez. Back in the ring, Lynch tipped another ladder over, taking out most of the opponents. In the climax, both Lynch and Morgan scaled ladders where Lynch tipped Morgan's ladder toward the ring ropes, but Morgan placed her foot on the ring rope to balance the ladder and knocked Lynch out with a knee to the face. Morgan then unhooked the briefcase to win the match.

Next, Theory defended the United States Championship against Bobby Lashley. In the end, as Theory attempted A-Town Down on Lashley, Lashley escaped and forced Theory to submit to the Hurt Lock to win the title.

After that, Bianca Belair defended the Raw Women's Championship against Carmella. During the match, Carmella avoided a charging Belair, who crashed into the ring post. Carmella then performed a superkick on Belair for a nearfall. In the end, Belair performed the Kiss of Death on Carmella to retain the title. Following the match, as Belair celebrated her victory on a turnbuckle, Carmella returned and attacked Belair.

In the fourth match, The Usos (Jey Uso and Jimmy Uso) defended the Undisputed WWE Tag Team Championship against The Street Profits (Angelo Dawkins and Montez Ford). As The Usos attempted the 1D on Ford, Ford countered into a hurricanrana and sent The Usos to ringside. Ford performed a Frog Splash on Jey, however, Jimmy broke up the pin attempt. In the end, The Usos performed a double superkick and a 1D on Ford to retain the titles. Following the match, a replayed footage of the pinfall showed that Ford's shoulder was off the mat, thus the pinfall should not have been counted.

In the penultimate match, Ronda Rousey defended the SmackDown Women's Championship against Natalya. During the match, Rousey applied her own sharpshooter on Natalya, who made it to the rope to escape. Natalya then sent Rousey outside the ring, which caused Rousey to injure her knee. Natalya then applied the sharpshooter on Rousey while on the ring apron, but Rousey escaped and sent Natalya into the ring post. In the climax, Rousey attempted an armbar, but Natalya countered with a sharpshooter attempt, which Rousey countered with an ankle lock. Natalya attempted the sharpshooter again, but Rousey countered into an armbar on Natalya, who submitted, to retain the title. Following the match, Liv Morgan ran to the ring and cashed in her Money in the Bank contract. Rousey applied the ankle lock on Morgan, however, Morgan countered by kicking Rousey's knee and rolling up Rousey to win the title. This was Morgan's first championship victory in her career.

=== Main event ===
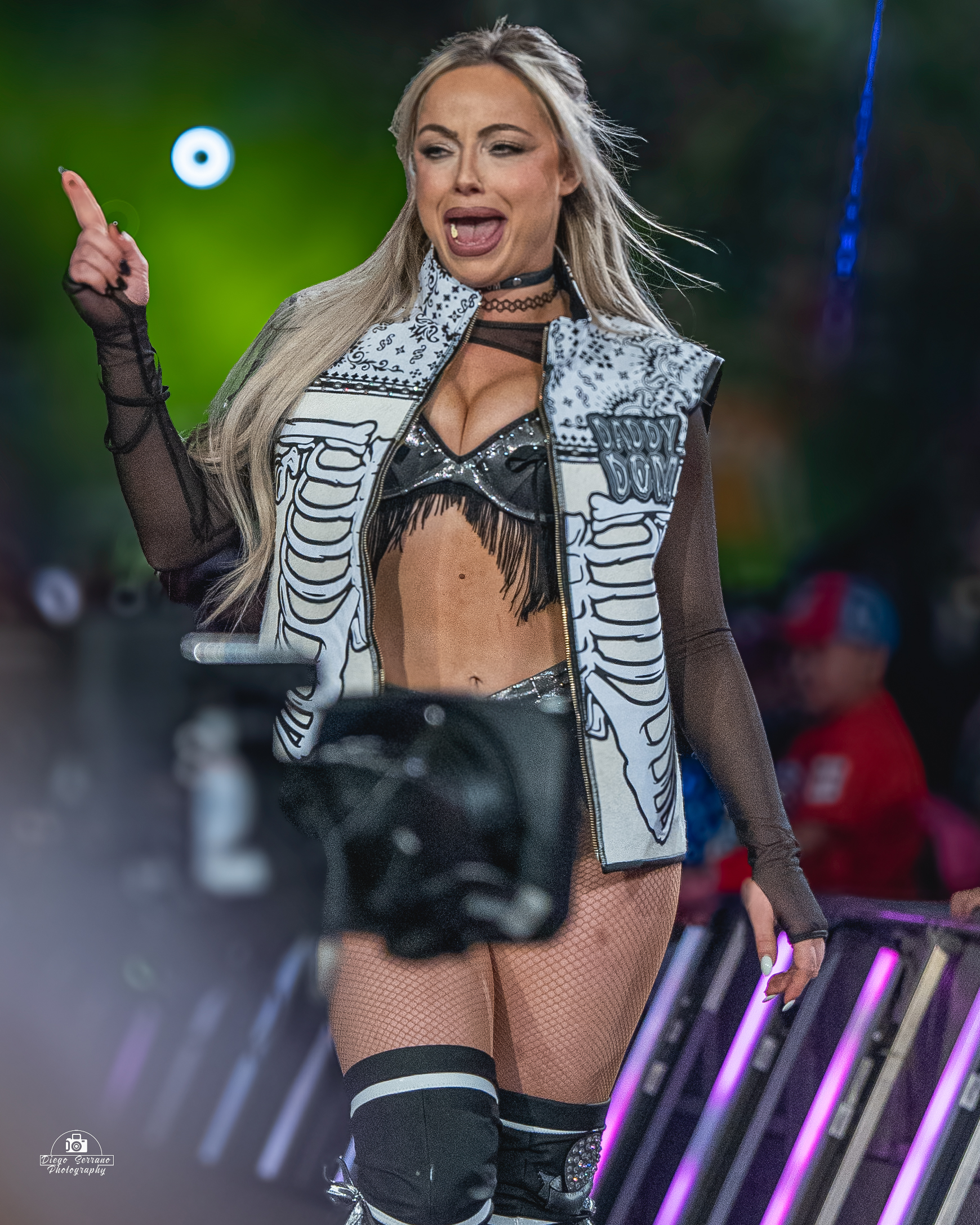
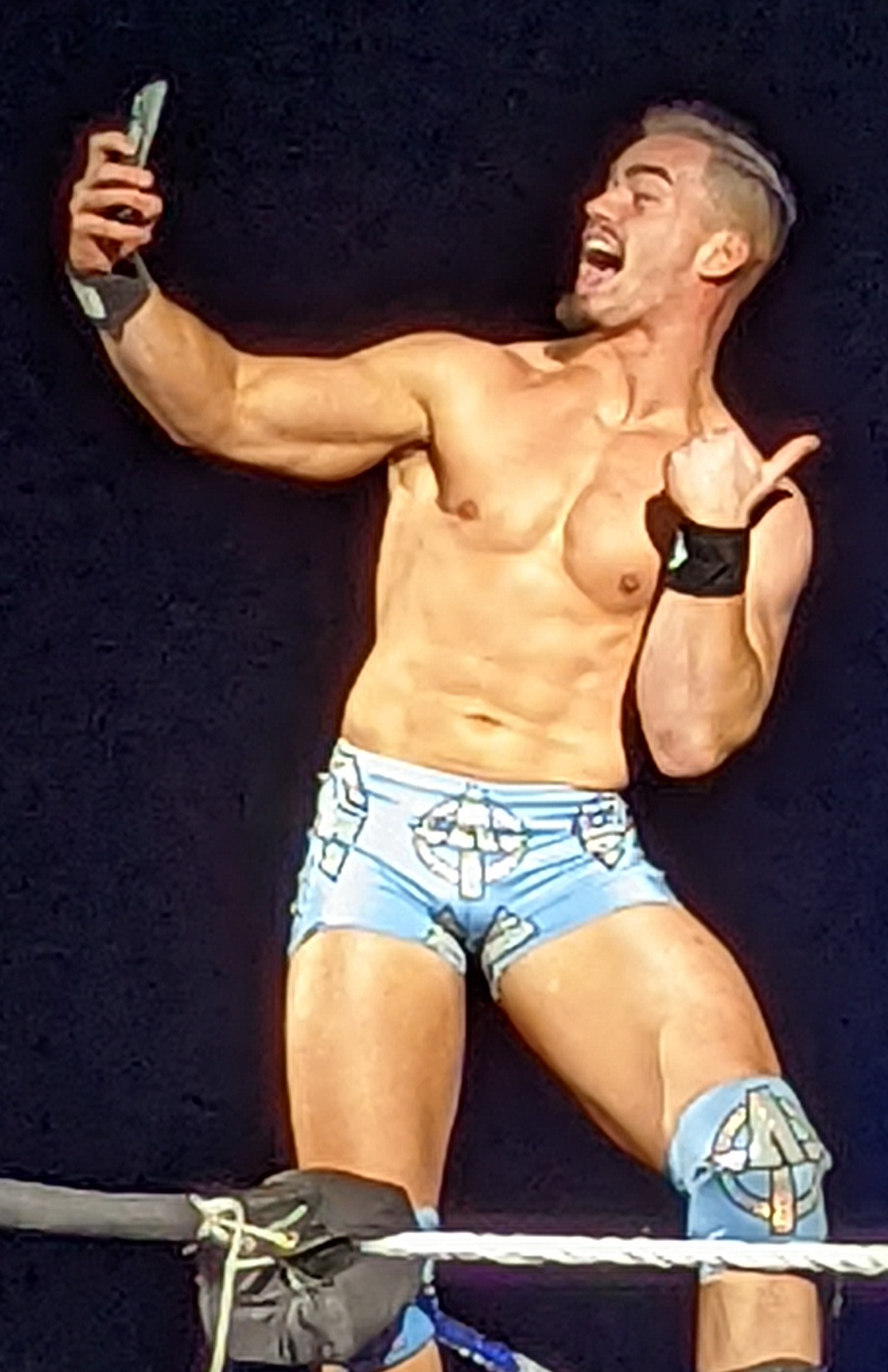
Liv Morgan and Theory, both from Raw, were the respective winners of the women's and men's Money in the Bank ladder matches.

The main event was the men's Money in the Bank ladder match, featuring Omos, Riddle, and Seth "Freakin" Rollins from Raw and Drew McIntyre, Madcap Moss, Sami Zayn, and Sheamus from SmackDown. Before the match officially began, WWE official Adam Pearce came out and announced that Theory, from Raw, would participate in the match, thus eight participants completed the match (four from each brand). During the match, Theory dove off the top rope at Omos, who caught Theory and chokeslammed him. Riddle and Sheamus beat Omos with ladders at ringside and knocked him down, after which, all the participants pilled numerous ladders on Omos to keep him down. Riddle performed a Hangman's DDT on Sheamus, whose legs were on a ladder. Outside the ring, all men ganged up on Omos and powerbombed him through the announce table. As McIntyre ascended the ladder, Butch ran out and attacked McIntyre. Sheamus placed the ladder over McIntyre and climbed the other side, but McIntyre pressed the ladder and knocked Sheamus down. McIntyre then performed a Claymore Kick on Butch. McIntyre and Sheamus were on top of the ladder when Zayn tipped it over, causing them to crash onto another ladder. Moss then prevented Zayn from retrieving the briefcase, only to be knocked out with The Stomp by Rollins. In the climax, as Rollins ascended the ladder, Riddle performed an RKO on Rollins off the ladder. Riddle then climbed the ladder until Theory made it up the other side. After the two traded punches, Theory shoved Riddle down and unhooked the briefcase to win the match.

== Reception ==
The Usos vs. The Street Profits received a 4.5-star rating from Dave Meltzer, the highest of the night. The lowest would be Bianca Belair vs. Carmella, which received 2 stars. The United States, SmackDown Women's title, and the women's Money in the Bank matches received 3.25 stars, and the men's Money in the Bank match received 4.25 stars.

== Aftermath ==
The 2022 Money in the Bank would be WWE's final PLE in which WWE owner Vince McMahon served as the company's Chairman and Chief Executive Officer (CEO), as he announced his retirement on July 22. His daughter, Stephanie McMahon, and WWE President Nick Khan took over as co-CEOs, and the former also took over as Chairwoman of WWE. However, on January 10, 2023, Stephanie announced her resignation as co-CEO and Chairwoman, with Khan being named the sole CEO and Vince returning as Executive Chairman. It would also be the last Money in the Bank to take place in the United States until 2025.

The change to Saturdays for WWE's PLEs, which were previously traditionally held on Sundays, became permanent, with some exceptions, such as the two-night WrestleMania. The change was attributed to WWE president Nick Khan, who felt that "big sports events were better on Saturday nights".

=== Raw ===
On the following episode of Raw, Mr. Money in the Bank Theory announced he was granted a rematch against Bobby Lashley for the United States Championship at SummerSlam. Theory claimed that in addition to winning back the United States Championship at the event, he would also cash-in his Money in the Bank contract that same night on the Undisputed WWE Universal Champion. After a couple of failed attempts to cash-in on the Undisputed WWE Universal Championship, as well as a tease of cashing in on the NXT Championship, Theory finally cashed in the contract on the November 7 episode of Raw, challenging Seth "Freakin" Rollins for the United States Championship, but failed to win the title due to an attack by Lashley. This made Theory the first wrestler to use the contract on a non-world championship.

Bianca Belair and Carmella had a rematch for the Raw Women's Championship on the July 11 episode of Raw. The match ended in a count-out win for Carmella after Belair was distracted by Becky Lynch outside the ring, but Belair retained. Lynch opened the following Raw to talk about her issues about not getting a rematch against Belair for the Raw Women's Championship, and that whoever was the Raw Women's Champion by the end of the night would defend against Lynch at SummerSlam. Afterward, Lynch and Carmella attacked Belair, with Lynch ending the attack with a Manhandle Slam on Belair. The Raw Women's Championship match occurred immediately afterward with a stipulation that Carmella could win the title by count out, however, Belair pinned Carmella to retain the title, keeping her as the defending champion heading into her match against Lynch at SummerSlam.

=== SmackDown ===
With her win of the SmackDown Women's Championship, Liv Morgan was officially transferred to the SmackDown brand. On the following episode of SmackDown, Morgan delivered a heartfelt message for her win but was interrupted by Natalya, who tried to take credit for Morgan's win since she had hurt Rousey's leg. Rousey came out and congratulated Morgan but said she wanted a rematch. After Rousey defeated Natalya in a rematch, it was announced that Morgan would defend the title in a rematch against Rousey at SummerSlam.

Due to the controversial finish of the Undisputed WWE Tag Team Championship match, a rematch between The Usos (Jey Uso and Jimmy Uso) and The Street Profits (Angelo Dawkins and Montez Ford) was announced for SummerSlam. On the July 15 episode of SmackDown, after Dawkins defeated Jimmy despite Jimmy's shoulder being off the mat, WWE official Adam Pearce announced that WWE Hall of Famer and Nashville area native Jeff Jarrett would be the special guest referee for the match.

Also on the following SmackDown, Drew McIntyre was scheduled to face Sheamus to determine the number one contender for the Undisputed WWE Universal Championship at Clash at the Castle. As Sheamus feigned illness, the match did not occur. The match would later be scheduled to the July 29 episode as a Good Old Fashioned Donnybrook match, which McIntyre won.

== Results ==
No.	Results	Stipulations	Times
1	Liv Morgan defeated Alexa Bliss, Asuka, Becky Lynch, Lacey Evans, Raquel Rodriguez, and Shotzi by retrieving the briefcase	Money in the Bank ladder match for a women's championship match contract	16:35
2	Bobby Lashley defeated Theory (c) by submission	Singles match for the WWE United States Championship	11:05
3	Bianca Belair (c) defeated Carmella by pinfall	Singles match for the WWE Raw Women's Championship	7:10
4	The Usos (Jey Uso and Jimmy Uso) (c) defeated The Street Profits (Angelo Dawkins and Montez Ford) by pinfall	Tag team match for the Undisputed WWE Tag Team Championship (Note: The name "Undisputed WWE Tag Team Championship" referred to both the Raw Tag Team Championship and SmackDown Tag Team Championship being held and defended together, although both titles remained independently active.)	23:00
5	Ronda Rousey (c) defeated Natalya by submission	Singles match for the WWE SmackDown Women's Championship	12:30
6	Liv Morgan defeated Ronda Rousey (c) by pinfall	Singles match for the WWE SmackDown Women's Championship; This was Morgan's Money in the Bank cash-in match.	0:35
7	Theory defeated Drew McIntyre, Madcap Moss, Omos, Riddle, Sami Zayn, Seth "Freakin" Rollins, and Sheamus by retrieving the briefcase	Money in the Bank ladder match for a men's championship match contract	25:25
(c) / – the champion(s) heading into the match
