= SummerSlam (2021) =

WWE pay-per-view and livestreaming event

- Promotional poster featuring Roman Reigns and John Cena
- Promotion: WWE
- Brand(s): Raw; SmackDown
- Date: August 21, 2021
- City: Paradise, Nevada
- Venue: Allegiant Stadium
- Attendance: 51,326

WWE event chronology
← Previous; Money in the Bank	Next → NXT TakeOver 36

SummerSlam chronology
← Previous; 2020	Next → 2022

The 2021 SummerSlam was a professional wrestling pay-per-view (PPV) and livestreaming event produced by WWE, held for wrestlers from the promotion's main roster brands, Raw and SmackDown. It was the 34th annual SummerSlam and took place on Saturday, August 21, 2021, at Allegiant Stadium in the Las Vegas suburb of Paradise, Nevada. This was the second SummerSlam to be held on a Saturday, after 1992, but the first to air live on that day, as the 1992 event aired on tape delay on the following Monday. It was also the first SummerSlam to take place in a stadium since that same 1992 event.

Due to April's WrestleMania 37 having to be held at a reduced capacity because of the COVID-19 pandemic, SummerSlam was promoted as WWE's "biggest event of 2021", as WWE had returned to live touring with full capacity crowds the previous month. The event had an attendance of 45,690. This was also the first SummerSlam to livestream on SonyLIV in India and Peacock in the United States following the shutdown of the Indian version of the WWE Network in February and the American version in April, and it was WWE's first event to air in theaters across the United States. It would also be the final SummerSlam to have creative involvement of Vince McMahon, who created SummerSlam in 1988.

Eleven matches were contested at the event, including one on the Kickoff pre-show. In the main event, Roman Reigns defeated John Cena to retain SmackDown's Universal Championship. In other prominent matches, Bobby Lashley defeated Goldberg by referee stoppage to retain Raw's WWE Championship, Edge defeated Seth Rollins, Charlotte Flair defeated defending champion Nikki A.S.H. and Rhea Ripley in a triple threat match to win her record sixth Raw Women's Championship, Damian Priest defeated Sheamus to win Raw's United States Championship, and in the opening bout, RK-Bro (Randy Orton and Riddle) defeated AJ Styles and Omos to win the Raw Tag Team Championship. This event also marked the return of Brock Lesnar following a hiatus since WrestleMania 36 in April 2020.

== Production ==
=== Background ===
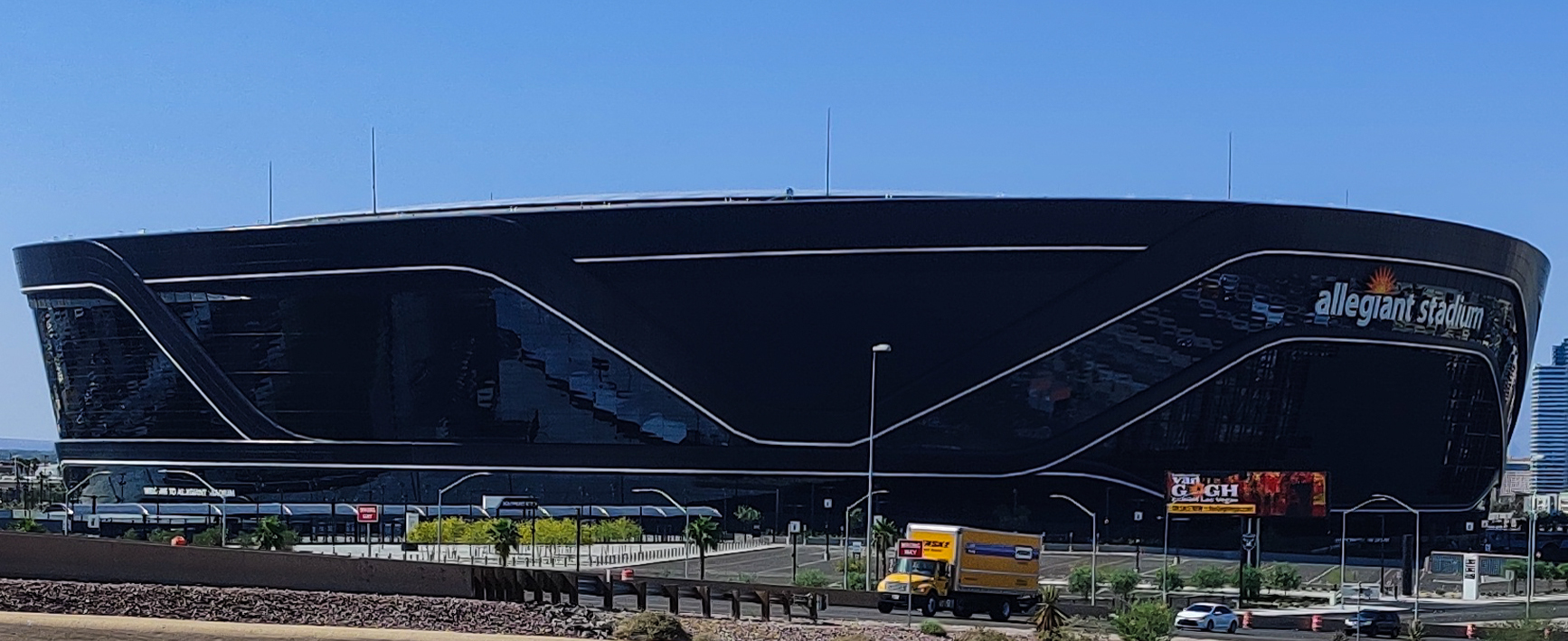
The 34th annual SummerSlam was held at the Allegiant Stadium in the Las Vegas suburb of Paradise, Nevada, marking the second SummerSlam to be held in a stadium, after the 1992 event.

SummerSlam is an annual professional wrestling event produced every August by WWE since 1988. It was originally broadcast exclusively via pay-per-view (PPV) before it began simultaneously livestreaming on the WWE Network in 2014. Dubbed "The Biggest Party of the Summer", it is one of the promotion's original four PPVs, along with WrestleMania, Royal Rumble, and Survivor Series, referred to as the "Big Four". It has since become considered WWE's second biggest event of the year behind WrestleMania.

On May 28, 2021, WWE announced that the 34th SummerSlam would take place live on Saturday, August 21, featuring wrestlers from the Raw and SmackDown brand divisions. This marked the first SummerSlam to be held on a Saturday since the 1992 event (which was pre-taped on a Saturday and aired on tape delay on a Monday), as well as the first SummerSlam to not be held on a Sunday since the 1994 event, which took place on a Monday. During the 2021 Belmont Stakes's pre-race show on June 5, the Allegiant Stadium in the Las Vegas district of Paradise, Nevada was confirmed as the host venue for SummerSlam. While WWE had typically hosted PPV and livestreaming events on Sunday nights at this time, the Wrestling Observer Newsletter reported that it was Allegiant Stadium that wanted SummerSlam held on a Saturday. This marked the second SummerSlam to be held in a football stadium, with the foremost being the 1992 event at the original Wembley Stadium in London, England, but the first to be held in a National Football League stadium in the United States. Travel packages became available on June 11 while individual tickets went on sale on June 18. WWE planned for SummerSlam to be more grandiose than April's WrestleMania 37 event, mostly because the latter had to be held at a reduced venue capacity due to the COVID-19 pandemic, with the company going as far as to promote SummerSlam as its "biggest event of 2021".

As part of SummerSlam Week, WWE held a multi-day tryout in the Las Vegas area to sign new wrestlers to developmental contracts. Additionally, following John Cena's return to WWE at the previous event, Money in the Bank, the company began a tour titled the "Summer of Cena". The tour had Cena appearing on Raw, SmackDown, and at WWE Live events in the weeks leading up to and including SummerSlam. WWE also partnered with TikTok to host a contest to select one guest ring announcer for SummerSlam. Music producer and disc jockey Valentino Khan opened the event with a musical performance. Following the event, actress, comedian, and author Tiffany Haddish hosted the official SummerSlam afterparty; additionally, WWE made a donation in support of her foster care charity, the She Ready Foundation.

SummerSlam was held on the same night as the Manny Pacquiao vs. Yordenis Ugás boxing match, which took place at the nearby T-Mobile Arena. WWE planned for SummerSlam to end before the card's main event, so that those attending in-person would have enough time to travel from Allegiant Stadium to T-Mobile Arena in time for the fight, and to avoid counterprogramming for PPV watchers who ordered both shows. SummerSlam ended just as Pacquiao made his entrance.

=== Broadcast outlets ===
SummerSlam was broadcast on traditional PPV worldwide. It was also available to livestream on Peacock in the United States, SonyLIV in India, and the WWE Network everywhere else. This was the first SummerSlam to livestream on SonyLIV and Peacock, following the shutdown of the Indian version of the WWE Network in February and the American version in April. SummerSlam also aired in movie theaters across the United States, thus marking WWE's first PPV and livestreaming event to air in theaters in the country.

==== COVID-19 mask mandate ====
With COVID-19 cases declining due to vaccinations in the United States and most establishments lifting pandemic protocols, WWE resumed live touring in mid-July, running shows at full venue capacity. Shortly after, however, COVID-19 cases began rising again due to the emergence of the Delta variant of the virus. On July 27, Nevada Governor Steve Sisolak ordered an indoor mask mandate for counties in "high" or "substantial" transmission levels, as deemed by new mask guidance from the CDC, effective July 30. On August 4, Allegiant Stadium and Ticketmaster released official statements that masks would be required for all attendees (ages 2+), regardless of vaccination status, for the event.

=== Storylines ===
The event comprised 11 matches, including one on the Kickoff pre-show, that resulted from scripted storylines. Results were predetermined by WWE's writers on the Raw and SmackDown brands, while storylines were produced on WWE's weekly television shows, Monday Night Raw and Friday Night SmackDown.

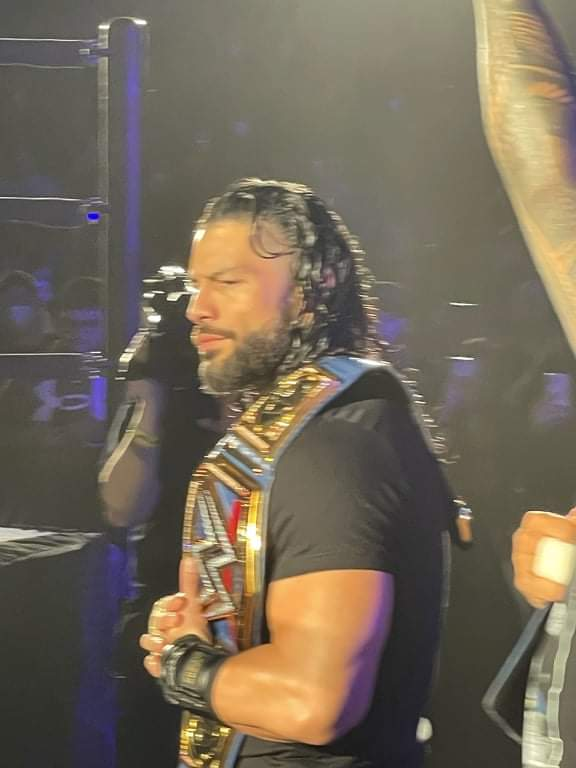
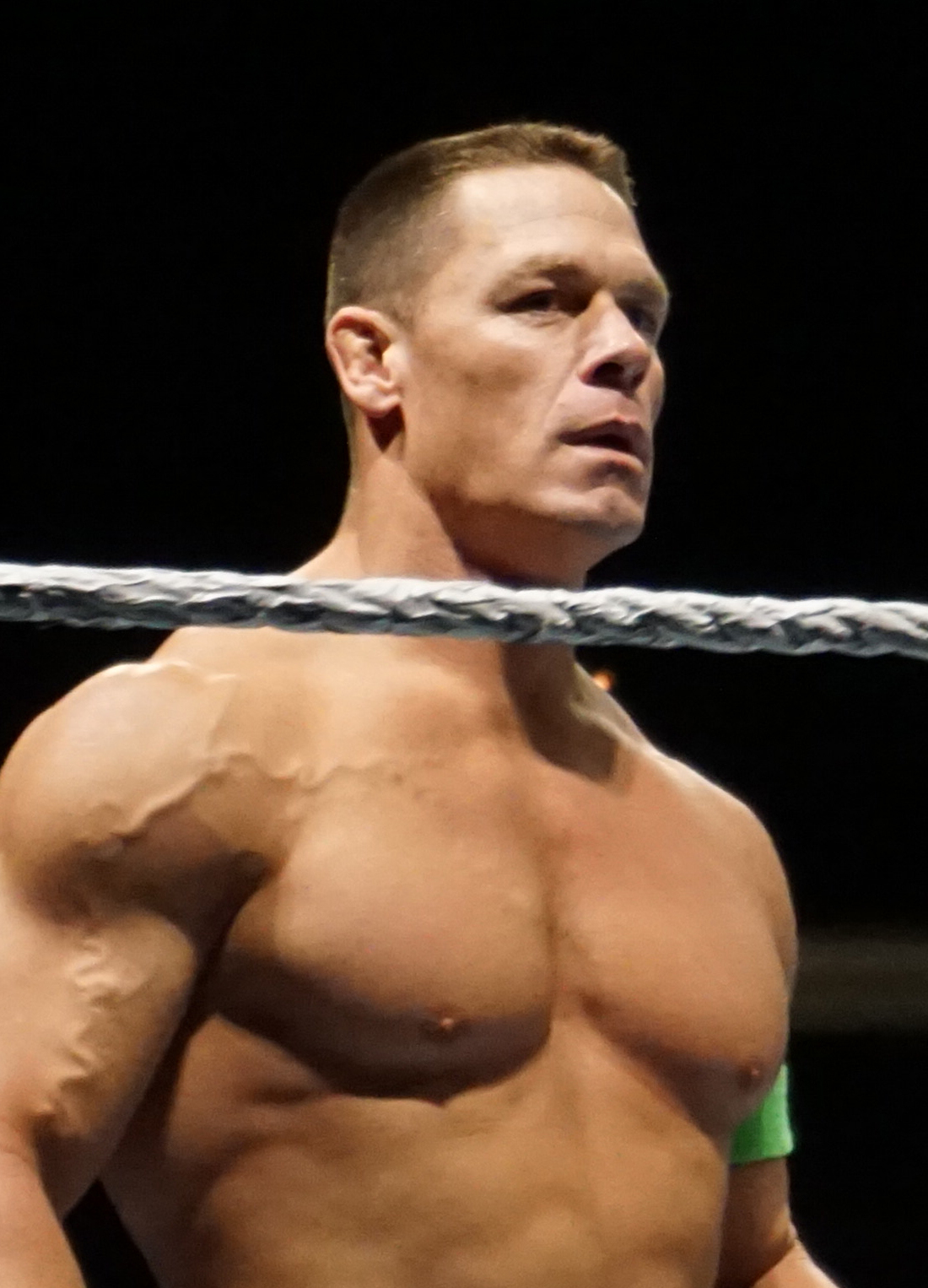
The predominant rivalry heading into SummerSlam was between Roman Reigns and John Cena over SmackDown's Universal Championship.

Following Roman Reigns's successful defense of the Universal Championship at Money in the Bank, he declared that everyone could now acknowledge him. John Cena then made a surprise return to WWE, marking his first appearance with the company since WrestleMania 36 in April 2020, where he had a brief stare down with Reigns before performing his signature "You Can't See Me" taunt at Reigns. Instead of waiting until SmackDown, Cena appeared on Raw the next night to explain himself, declaring that he wanted to put Reigns in his place. He then officially challenged Reigns for the Universal Championship at SummerSlam. On SmackDown, Cena appeared to confront Reigns, however, Reigns rejected the challenge and instead accepted a challenge from Finn Bálor, who himself had returned to SmackDown the previous week. During the contract signing the following week, Reigns signed the contract first, however, as Bálor attempted his signature, he was attacked by Baron Corbin, who instead tried to sign it. Cena then came out, attacked Corbin, and signed the contract himself, thus booking Reigns to defend the Universal Championship against Cena at SummerSlam. After getting into a heated promo on the SmackDown the night before SummerSlam, Reigns said he would leave WWE if he could not defeat Cena.

At Money in the Bank, Nikki A.S.H. won the women's Money in the Bank ladder match, earning a contract for a women's championship match of her choice at anytime of her choosing, while later that night, Charlotte Flair defeated Rhea Ripley to win the Raw Women's Championship. The following night on Raw, Flair defended the title against Ripley in a rematch; however, Flair was disqualified after striking Ripley with the title belt, thus Ripley won the match but not the championship as titles do not change hands by disqualification unless stipulated. Ripley and Flair then brawled and Ripley performed the Riptide on Flair at ringside. Nikki then ran out and cashed in her Money in the Bank contract on Flair to win the Raw Women's Championship. The following week, Flair and Ripley staked their claims to challenge Nikki for the title at SummerSlam. WWE officials Adam Pearce and Sonya Deville resolved the matter by scheduling Nikki to defend the championship against Flair and Ripley in a triple threat match at the event.

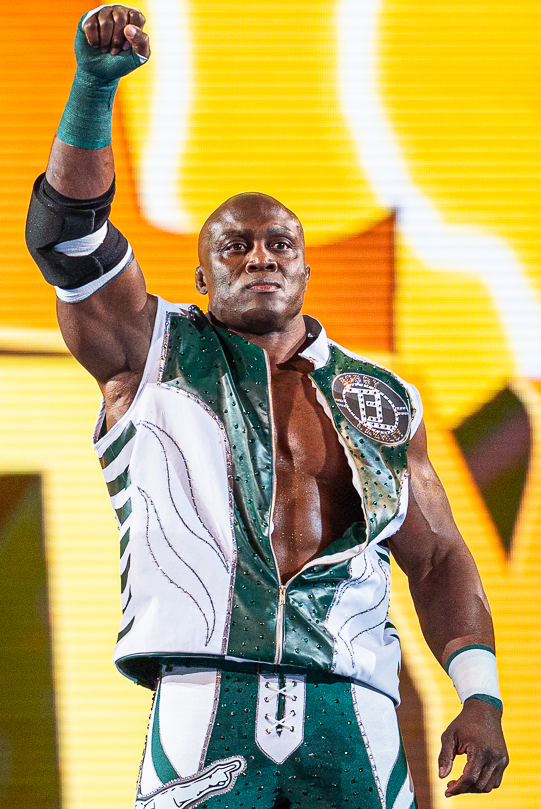
Bobby Lashley defended Raw's WWE Championship against WWE Hall of Famer Goldberg at the event.

On the July 19 episode of Raw, after Bobby Lashley's successful WWE Championship defense, Lashley and his manager MVP were confronted by WWE Hall of Famer Goldberg, appearing for the first time since the Royal Rumble in January. Goldberg proclaimed that he would be Lashley's next challenger for the title. The following week, however, Lashley rejected Goldberg's challenge. On the August 2 episode, Goldberg appeared and confronted the champion face-to-face, stating that he would defeat Lashley for the title. The match was subsequently confirmed for SummerSlam.

After Edge was granted a Universal Championship match at Money in the Bank, Seth Rollins took issue with this decision, feeling that he deserved the opportunity. At the event, Rollins cost Edge his championship match and the two brawled into the crowd. On the following episode of SmackDown, Edge called out Rollins and stated that their issues dated back to December 2014 when Rollins had attempted to injure Edge's surgically repaired neck and definitively put an end to his career. Rollins then came out and claimed he despised older wrestlers like Edge and John Cena for coming back and taking opportunities from the current wrestlers who earned them. A brawl then ensued. The following week, Rollins attacked Edge during his entrance and declared that if he could not be Universal Champion, then neither could Edge. On the August 6 episode, Edge challenged Rollins to a match at SummerSlam, which Rollins accepted.

On the July 5 episode of Raw, Drew McIntyre faced and defeated his old 3MB stablemate Jinder Mahal (accompanied by Shanky and Veer) after Mahal felt that McIntyre had cost him an opportunity to compete in the men's Money in the Bank ladder match. Following the match, Mahal, Shanky, and Veer attacked McIntyre and stole McIntyre's family sword that he used for his entrance theatrics. The following week, Mahal, Shanky, and Veer dismantled the sword only for McIntyre to reveal that it was a replica. McIntyre then proceeded to dismantle Mahal's motorcycle. At Money in the Bank, Mahal, Shanky, and Veer cost McIntyre the men's Money in the Bank ladder match. On the following night's episode of Raw, Mahal, Shanky, and Veer gloated about costing McIntyre the match only for McIntyre to attack all three with a steel chair. McIntyre then defeated Shanky and Veer in matches over the next couple of weeks. On August 13, a match between McIntyre and Mahal was scheduled for SummerSlam. On the August 16 episode of Raw, McIntyre defeated Shanky and Veer in a handicap match, thus banning the two from ringside at SummerSlam.

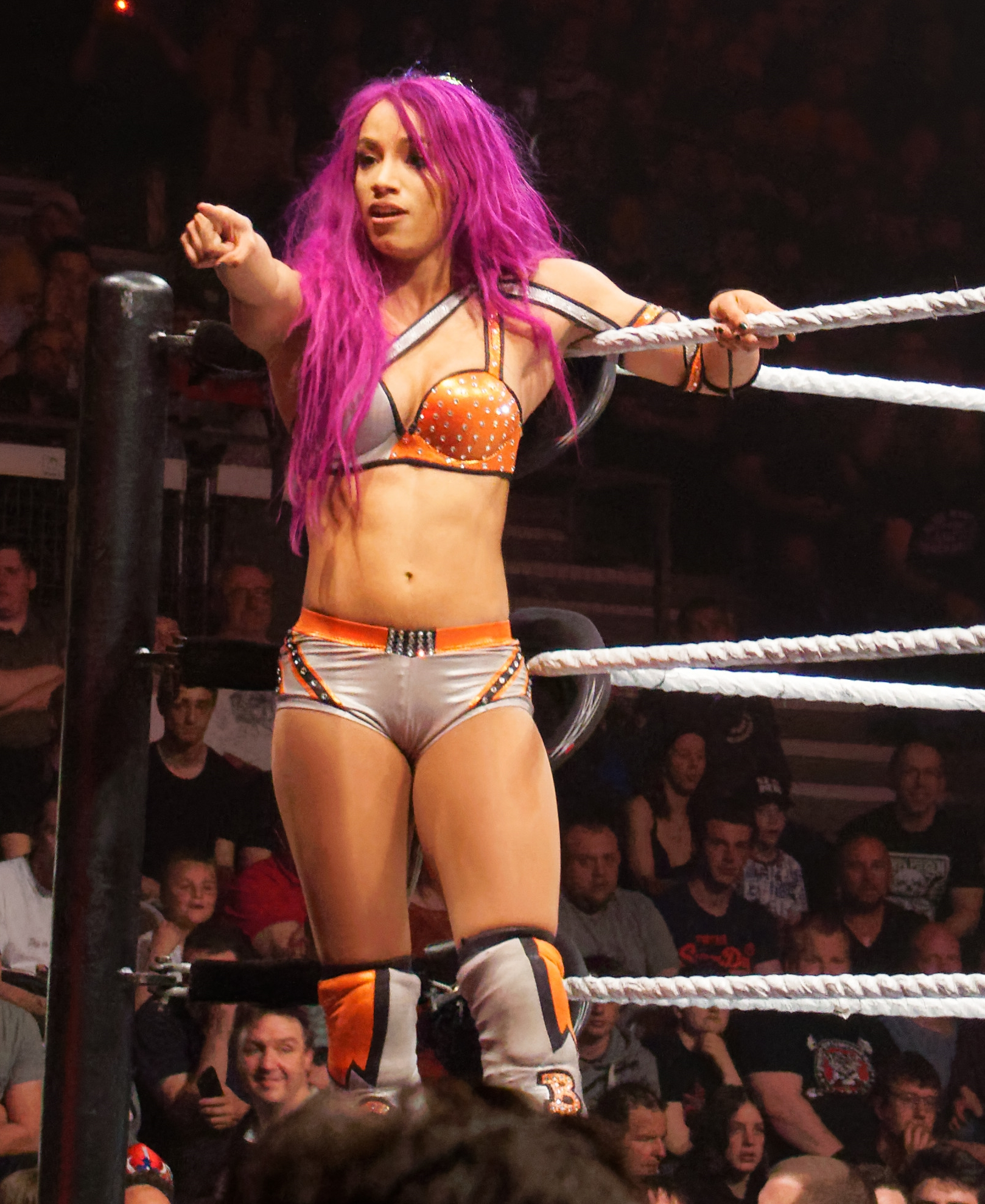
Sasha Banks was scheduled to face Bianca Belair for the SmackDown Women's Championship in a rematch from WrestleMania 37.

On Night 1 of WrestleMania 37, Bianca Belair defeated Sasha Banks to win the SmackDown Women's Championship. On the July 30 episode of SmackDown, both Carmella and Zelina Vega staked their claims to challenge Belair for the title. The two then attacked Belair, who was saved by Banks, making her first appearance since the SmackDown after WrestleMania. Banks and Belair then teamed up and defeated Carmella and Vega in a tag team match. Following the match, however, Banks ambushed Belair from behind, thereby turning heel in the process. The subsequent week, Banks challenged Belair to a match for the title at SummerSlam, which Belair accepted.

On the Money in the Bank Kickoff pre-show, The Usos (Jey Uso and Jimmy Uso) defeated The Mysterios (Rey Mysterio and Dominik Mysterio) to win the SmackDown Tag Team Championship. On the following SmackDown, Jimmy defeated Dominik with the same pinning combination that won The Usos the titles. The following week, Rey defeated Jimmy with the same pinning combination. On August 5, a championship rematch between the two teams was scheduled for SummerSlam.

On the April 19 episode of Raw, Riddle interrupted an interview by Randy Orton backstage and suggested they form a team named RK-Bro. This led to a match between the two, which Riddle won. The following week, Orton and Riddle teamed up for the first time to win their match. In June, Orton would be out of action due to an injury, and Riddle would take his place in the triple threat match to qualify for Raw's final spot in the men's Money in the Bank match, also involving one-half of the Raw Tag Team Champions, AJ Styles, which Riddle lost after Styles's tag team partner, Omos, pulled Styles out of the ring. On the August 2 episode, Riddle lost to Omos. The following week, Orton made his return, but was interrupted by Riddle, who suggested that they reform RK-Bro before both were interrupted by Styles and Omos. This led to a match between Orton and Styles for that episode's main event, which Orton won. Afterwards, Orton hugged Riddle before performing an RKO on him. On the August 16 episode, Riddle again suggested to reform RK-Bro before being interrupted by Styles and Omos. This led to a match between Styles and Riddle, which Styles won. Later that night, Orton defeated Omos via disqualification after interference from Styles. After the match, Riddle appeared and took out Styles and Omos, after which, Orton told Riddle that he had finally earned his respect, and Riddle announced that he and Orton had reunited as RK-Bro and would face Styles and Omos for the Raw Tag Team Championship at SummerSlam.

On the July 26 episode of Raw, before Damian Priest defeated United States Champion Sheamus in a non-title match, Priest stated that he would be setting his sights on the title. The following week, after Priest won his match, Sheamus attacked Priest from behind before Ricochet made the save. This led to a tag team match where Priest won for his team. On the August 9 episode, after Sheamus retained against Ricochet in an open challenge, Sheamus avoided a sneak attack from Priest. After Priest won his match, Priest challenged Sheamus for the United States Championship at SummerSlam, which Sheamus accepted.

On the Raw after WrestleMania 37, Alexa Bliss unveiled a demonic looking doll named Lilly. Over the coming months, the doll helped Bliss's enemies lose their matches. In July, Eva Marie and Doudrop were intertwined in the feud. On the July 26 episode of Raw, Marie and Doudrop lost their match after Bliss showed a "Lillylution" video. The following week, Marie and Doudrop attacked Bliss in the latter's playground before Lilly stood up on her own. On the August 9 episode, Bliss defeated Doudrop after Lilly winked at Doudrop. The following week, a match between Bliss and Marie was scheduled for SummerSlam.

== Event ==
Other on-screen personnel
Role:	Name:
English commentators	Michael Cole (SmackDown)
English commentators	Pat McAfee (SmackDown)
English commentators	Jimmy Smith (Raw)
English commentators	Corey Graves (Raw)
English commentators	Byron Saxton (Raw)
Spanish commentators	Carlos Cabrera
Spanish commentators	Marcelo Rodriguez
Ring announcers	Greg Hamilton (SmackDown)
Ring announcers	Mike Rome (Raw)
Ring announcers	Raine Cruz (guest)
Referees	Danilo Anfibio
Referees	Jason Ayers
Referees	Jessika Carr
Referees	Dan Engler
Referees	Darrick Moore
Referees	Eddie Orengo
Referees	Chad Patton
Referees	Rod Zapata
Interviewers	Sarah Schreiber
Interviewers	Mario Lopez
Interviewers	Tiffany Haddish
Pre-show panel	Kayla Braxton
Pre-show panel	Kevin Patrick
Pre-show panel	Peter Rosenberg
Pre-show panel	Booker T
Pre-show panel	Jerry Lawler
Pre-show panel	Sonya Deville

=== Pre-show ===
During the SummerSlam Kickoff pre-show, a match between Big E and Baron Corbin was scheduled. In the end, as Corbin tried to leave the match with Big E's Money in the Bank briefcase, Big E tackled Corbin into the barricade. Big E performed the Big Ending on Corbin to win the match and regain possession of his Money in the Bank contract.

=== Preliminary matches ===
The actual event opened with AJ Styles and Omos defending the Raw Tag Team Championship against RK-Bro (Randy Orton and Riddle). During the match, after Omos dominated Riddle, Styles performed an assisted Tornado DDT on Riddle for a nearfall. Later, Orton tagged in and dominated Styles and Omos. Orton performed a draping DDT on Styles and went for an RKO, but Omos pulled him out of the ring. Riddle then shoved Omos into the ring post, only for Styles to perform a reverse DDT on Riddle. In the end, Orton attempted an RKO, but Styles countered into a roll-up for a nearfall. Moments later, Orton performed an RKO on Styles to win the titles.

Next, Alexa Bliss took on Eva Marie (accompanied by Doudrop). Before the match began, Bliss placed Lilly atop a turnbuckle. Marie taunted Bliss by taking the doll and slapping it which enraged Bliss. As Bliss attempted Twisted Bliss on Marie, Marie moved out of the way. In the end, Bliss performed a DDT on Marie to win the match. Following the match, Doudrop announced Marie as the loser of the match and proceeded to wear Marie's robe.

After that, Sheamus defended the United States Championship against Damian Priest. In the closing moments of the match, as Sheamus applied a Leg Lock on Priest, Priest grabbed and removed Sheamus' protective face mask (as Sheamus had broken his nose a few weeks prior in a match against Humberto Carrillo). As Sheamus attempted a Brogue Kick, Priest performed a Spinning Kick and the Reckoning on Sheamus to win the title and start his first reign as "El Campion" on the main roster.

In the fourth match, The Usos (Jey Uso and Jimmy Uso) defended the SmackDown Tag Team Championship against The Mysterios (Rey Mysterio and Dominik Mysterio). In the end, after an evenly competitive match, The Usos performed a Double Superkick on Rey and Jimmy performed a Uso Splash on Rey to retain the titles.

Following this, a brief segment then occurred with Rick Boogs playing the entrance theme of Intercontinental Champion King Nakamura to the ring. Nakamura eventually made his entrance alongside Boogs, where they danced alongside SmackDown commentator Pat McAfee.

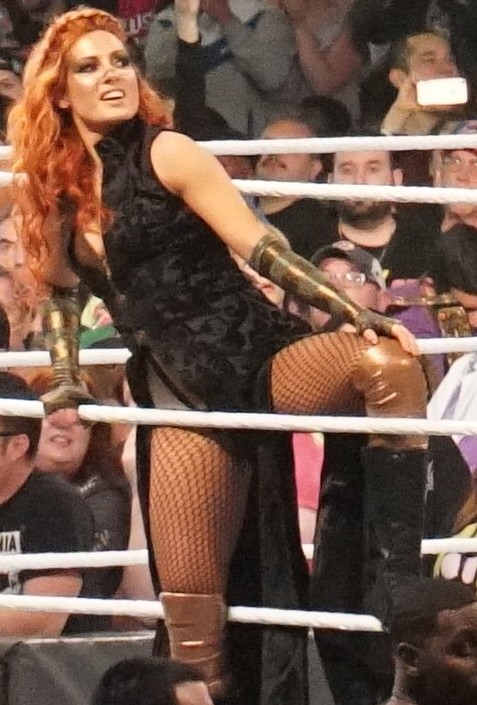
In her first appearance since May 2020, Becky Lynch (pictured) made a surprise return from maternity leave and defeated Bianca Belair in 26 seconds to win the SmackDown Women's Championship.

Next, Bianca Belair was scheduled to defend the SmackDown Women's Championship against Sasha Banks. However, it was announced that Banks was not cleared to compete and would be replaced by Carmella. Before the match began, Becky Lynch (in her first appearance since the Raw after Money in the Bank in May 2020) returned from her maternity leave and attacked Carmella. Lynch then challenged Belair for the title, which Belair accepted. As Lynch offered a handshake to which Belair accepted, Lynch struck Belair with a forearm and performed the Manhandle Slam to win the title in 26 seconds.

Following this, a brief segment occurred where U.S. Olympic gold medalists (in wrestling), Tamyra Mensah-Stock and Gable Steveson, came out and the crowd cheered them while the two Olympians proudly displayed their respective medals.

In the sixth match, Drew McIntyre took on Jinder Mahal in which Mahal's teammates Shanky and Veer were banned from ringside. In the end, McIntyre performed the Future Shock DDT and the Claymore Kick on Mahal to win the match. Afterwards, Veer and Shanky came out to check on Mahal and McIntyre chased all three of them off with his sword.

Next, Nikki A.S.H. defended the Raw Women's Championship against Rhea Ripley and Charlotte Flair in a triple threat match. At the start, Flair shoved Nikki. Both Nikki and Flair countered the Riptide from Ripley. Nikki performed a Crossbody off the top rope onto Ripley and Flair who were outside the ring. Flair countered a Double Suplex into a Double DDT on Ripley and Nikki. Flair then performed a Moonsault on Ripley and Nikki off the top rope. As Flair applied the Figure Eight on Ripley, Nikki performed a Splash to avoid the submission. In the end, after moving out of the way of a Splash from Nikki, Flair forced Nikki to submit to the Figure Eight to win her record sixth Raw Women's Championship, making her 14th overall singles title in WWE, and her 15th title overall, although WWE has promoted it as her 12th singles title, not counting her two NXT Women's Championship reigns.

In the eighth match, Edge took on Seth Rollins. Edge reenacted The Brood's entrance (a group Edge was once a member of earlier in his WWE career in 1998–1999) before coming to the ring to his regular entrance. Rollins began to target the surgically repaired neck of Edge by slamming it into the steel steps. Rollins performed a Frog Splash on Edge for a nearfall. Edge performed a Swinging Neckbreaker from the top rope on Rollins. As Edge went back to the top rope, Rollins performed a Superplex and a Falcon Arrow on Edge for a nearfall. Edge countered The Stomp and a Pedigree from Rollins and performed a Glam Slam for a nearfall. As Rollins went for The Stomp on the apron, Edge countered and performed a Spear on Rollins sending both of them out of the ring. Rollins countered a Spear attempt by Edge into a Pedigree for another nearfall. Edge performed a Corkscrew Moonsault and a Spear on Rollins for a nearfall. In the end, Edge countered The Stomp again and locked in an Edgecator and a Crossface. Edge rammed Rollins' head into the ring mat several times and locked in a Bulldog Choke, submitting Rollins to win the match.

After that, John Morrison and The Miz came to the ring to reveal their surprise, the Drip Stick 2000. The New Day's Xavier Woods came out with the device and sprayed Miz and Morrison out of the ring.

In the penultimate match, Bobby Lashley (with MVP) defended the WWE Championship against Goldberg. After a domination from Goldberg and Lashley respectively, the last was thrown by the first from the top of a corner into the ring, slamming his back. Goldberg attempted a Spear on Lashley, but when MVP took Lashley out of the ring, Goldberg performed the move on Lashley at ringside. Back in the ring, while Lashley was rolling for recovering, MVP attacked Goldberg with his cane on one knee. Then, Lashley attacked the injured knee with multiple chop blocks and rammed it into a ring post. Goldberg was unable to continue, resulting in the referee stopping the match and Lashley retaining the WWE Championship. After the match, Lashley attacked the injured knee again with a chair and also gave Goldberg a little cut on a shoulder. Finally, Goldberg's 15-year-old son, Gage, came to his father's aid, but Lashley applied a Hurt Lock on Gage.

=== Main event ===
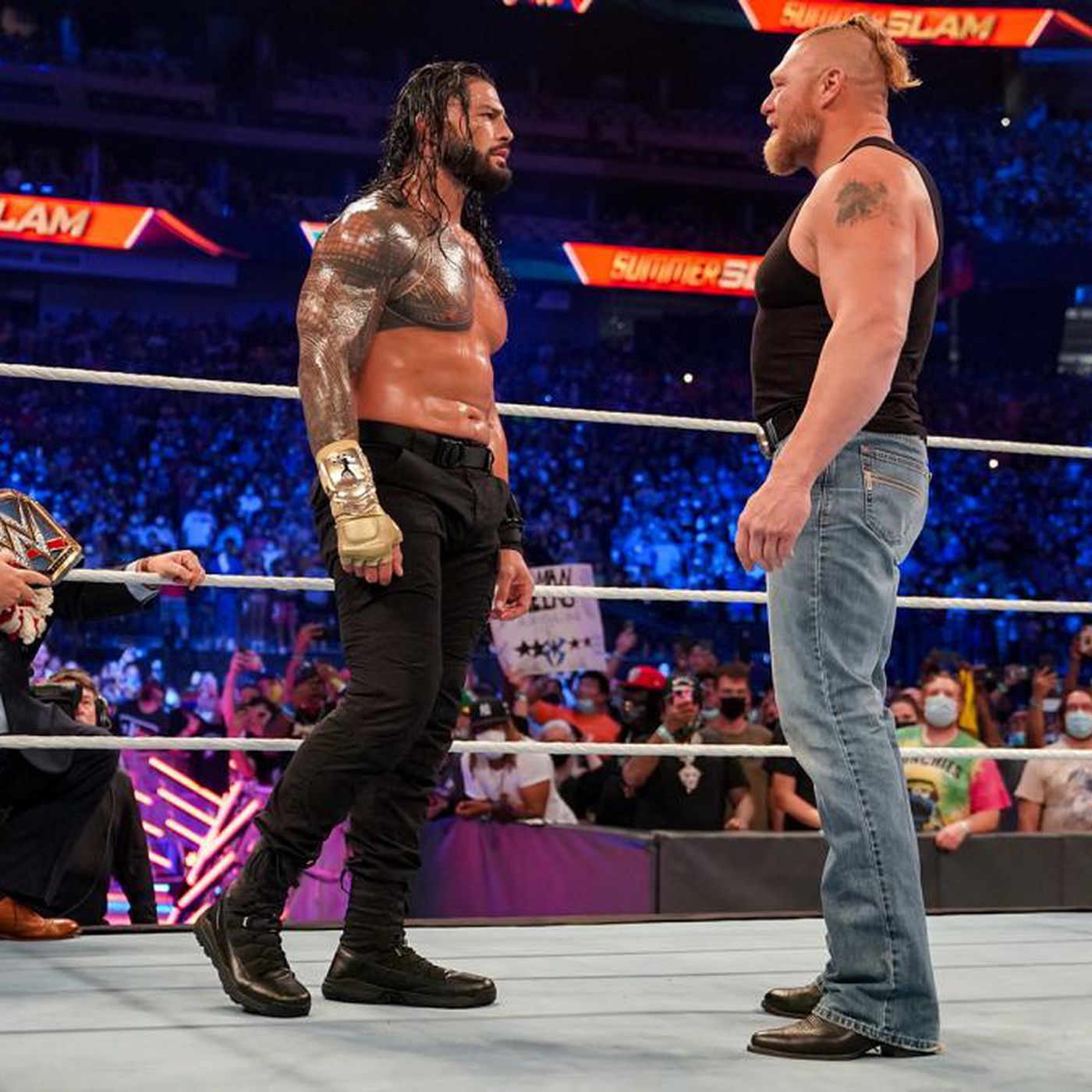
Brock Lesnar returned for the first time since WrestleMania 36 in April 2020 after the main event and confronted Roman Reigns.

In the main event, Roman Reigns (accompanied by Paul Heyman) defended the Universal Championship against John Cena with a stipulation that Reigns would leave WWE if he lost. Cena started with Roll-Up and Inside Cradle pin attempts. Reigns countered the Attitude Adjustment into a DDT for a nearfall. Reigns locked in a Guillotine Choke, however, Cena escaped. As Reigns attempted a Spear, Cena countered with a kick and a Five Knuckle Shuffle. Cena performed an Attitude Adjustment on Reigns for a nearfall. As Cena applied the STF, Reigns reached the rope to void the submission. Cena performed a second Attitude Adjustment on Reigns through the announce table, after which, Cena rolled Reigns back in the ring for a nearfall. As Cena attempted another Attitude Adjustment, Reigns performed a Superman Punch for a nearfall. Reigns attempted another Spear on Cena, however, Cena moved out of the way and Reigns rammed into the ring post. Cena performed a Super Attitude Adjustment off the top rope for a nearfall. In the end, as Cena taunted Reigns and attempted his own Spear, Reigns performed the Superman Punch twice and a Spear on Cena to retain the title and stay in WWE. Following the match, Brock Lesnar returned for the first time since WrestleMania 36 and confronted Reigns much to Heyman's surprise. After a stare down, Reigns left the ring as the crowd cheered Lesnar to end the event. After the event went off the air, Lesnar executed multiple German suplexes and an F-5 on Cena, reminiscent of their match from SummerSlam in 2014.

== Reception ==
WWE reported an attendance of 51,326. However, a tweet by WrestleTix said that the capacity for the event was 46,482, and that the number of tickets distributed was 45,690. The 2023 event overtook the 2021 event for both the second largest crowd and highest-grossing SummerSlam of all time. The event itself received generally positive reviews with two matches (Cena vs. Reigns and Edge vs. Rollins) especially praised by multiple reviewers, while the rest of the undercard was not as well received with mixed reviews and criticisms.

Brent Brookhouse of CBS Sports gave the Edge vs. Seth Rollins match a grade of A+, stating that the match "was stunningly good stuff from start to finish with a clear story told in the ring with Rollins' ruthless focus on Edge's neck and Edge running through a history of classic moves before going to "the dark place" to get the finish". He gave the Universal Championship match a grade of A−, stating that the match was "solid stuff", and that the match had "a slow early build before flipping to the next level". Brookhouse stated that Alexa Bliss vs. Eva Marie was "a match without substance", but was "for the best when it comes to Eva Marie", and "as a bonus, there was very little involvement from the doll". However, Brookhouse criticized the SmackDown Women's Championship match, giving it a D+ grade, stating that the "elation" of Becky Lynch's return "was completely squandered when Lynch won the title so quickly". He concluded that "the moment of the return was great", but "the payoff was awful". Brookhouse stated that the worst match of the event was the WWE Championship match, which he gave a grade of D. He said that "the match wasn't going to be worth anything", and that the ending of the match "was terrible and really brought the crowd down even though the crowd did not want Goldberg to win". Finally, he said that "this appears to have set up a rematch, however, which is yet another thing no one is asking for".

Erik Beaston of Bleacher Report gave the Edge vs. Seth Rollins match a grade of B+, stating that "the psychology and storytelling within this one were phenomenal and led to the best match of the show, by far". He said that "the match reflected the story", and that Rollins enraged Edge "to the point that he had to reach deep down within himself to find a dark side". Beaston concluded that "Rollins will come back, probably more driven and disturbed than ever before, looking to avenge the loss that took him further out of universal title contention. If it means another match between the two, bring it on". He also gave the Universal Championship match a grade of B+, stating that it was "a dramatic main event executed to perfection by two masters of their craft", the "timing of the near-falls was flawless", and that the crowd was "genuinely convinced either man could leave with the gold, despite WWE shoehorning in a stipulation late Friday". Beaston stated that "Reigns winning was absolutely the right call", stating that "his run as heel champion is unprecedented in its excellence and there's still plenty of mileage left on it". He also praised Brock Lesnar's return, stating that it would "be a dramatic storyline given the failures The Head of the Table has experienced against Lesnar". Beaston criticized the WWE Championship match, giving it a grade of D, stating that the match was "bad and totally exposed Goldberg's weaknesses", and that the ending was "designed almost exclusively to set up a rematch no one is asking for in Saudi Arabia". He also said that the fans being against Goldberg "did not help matters", and that a future match between Lashley and Goldberg "is anything but appealing and should be reconsidered before WWE manages to strip whatever mystique is left in the Goldberg character away for good". Beaston gave the Alexa Bliss vs. Eva Marie match a grade of F, stating that it was "disjointed" and "ugly", and that "the stuff with Lilly really needs to go", stating that "the idea of a doll winking and terrifying grown men and women is so far out of the realm of believable that it has become comically bad". Beaston also panned the SmackDown Women's Championship match, also giving it an F grade. He said that "what the company did to Bianca Belair and her championship reign was straight disrespectful", stating that "Belair, the same woman who survived grueling matches with Bayley and Banks, overcame numbers advantages against Carmella and Zelina Vega, was beaten in 26 seconds by Lynch", and that it "made no sense, completely unraveled months of creative strategy and by proxy, put a damper on Lynch's return".

Wade Keller of Pro Wrestling Torch gave the Universal Championship match 4.25 stars, stating that the beginning was "slow", but "built logically and effectively to a really good closing 10 minutes". He also praised Brock Lesnar's return, stating that he "already seems like he's having fun as a babyface". Keller gave the Edge vs. Seth Rollins match 4 stars, stating that the match was "dramatic", the near-falls were "effective", and that it had "innovative and nostalgic moves deep in the match to elevate the match to another level the longer it went". Keller criticized the WWE Championship match, giving it 1 star. He said that the match seemed "more like setting up a rematch then generically protecting Goldberg", while calling it "ambitious considering Goldberg age and his lack of matches lately along with just a general limited set of ring skills", and that the "flat "to be continued" finish took it down an extra notch". Keller gave the Drew McIntyre vs. Jinder Mahal match 0.75 stars, stating that Jinder, Shanky, and Veer had no point of being on the roster "if they blow off a feud that ate up all that TV time in such an anti-clamactic, but understandably swift, manner", and that McIntyre's sword "doesn't seem over with the fans". Keller stated that Becky Lynch's return was "a big moment" and "a net positive", but "less than ideal", stating that Belair's quick loss "pulls the rug out from under her". He also said that "they'd have been better to agree to a match another time, with Becky saying Belair deserves to have time to prepare for her, and then have Zelina Vega and Carmella attack them". Keller also said that this would not have happened "if it weren't for Bayley's injury and the Sasha situation, so compromises were made to avoid a big letdown since they have no one else credible to substitute in for Sasha against Belair".

The highest rated matches on the card, according to Dave Meltzer, were the Universal Championship match and Edge vs. Seth Rollins, both receiving 4.25 stars. The Raw Women's Championship match received 3.75 stars, the Raw and SmackDown Tag Team Championship matches both received 3.25 stars, the United States Championship match received 3 stars, the Kickoff pre-show match received 2.5 stars, the Drew McIntyre vs. Jinder Mahal match received 2 stars, and the WWE Championship match received 1.75 stars, while the only non-rated matches at the event were the Alexa Bliss vs. Eva Marie match and the SmackDown Women's Championship match.

== Aftermath ==
The 2021 SummerSlam would be the final SummerSlam in which WWE owner Vince McMahon served as the company's Chairman and Chief Executive Officer (CEO), as he announced his retirement on July 22, 2022, just eight days before the following year's SummerSlam, the first and only time a SummerSlam event was held in that month. His daughter, Stephanie McMahon, and WWE President Nick Khan took over as co-CEOs, and the former also took over as Chairwoman of WWE. However, on January 10, 2023, Stephanie announced her resignation as co-CEO and Chairwoman, with Khan being the sole CEO and Vince returning as Executive Chairman.

=== Raw ===
After SummerSlam, Goldberg was off television for the next month due to his (kayfabe) knee injury while Bobby Lashley lost the WWE Championship to Big E in the latter's Money in the Bank cash-in match. Goldberg returned on the October 4 episode of Raw and proclaimed that he would kill Lashley for what he did to his son. Lashley stated that his attack on Gage was a misunderstanding, which Goldberg refused to believe. Lashley then stated he would face Goldberg at Crown Jewel on the condition that the match was a No Holds Barred match, which Goldberg gladly accepted. The match was also stipulated as a Falls Count Anywhere match. At the event, Goldberg defeated Lashley to end the feud.

On the August 30 episode of Raw, new United States Champion Damian Priest defended the title against Sheamus and Drew McIntyre in a triple threat match where Priest retained. On the following episode, Sheamus defeated McIntyre to earn a rematch against Priest at Extreme Rules. On the September 20 episode, Jeff Hardy defeated Sheamus to earn a spot in the title match at Extreme Rules, thus making it a triple threat match.

On September 4, following his appearance at SummerSlam, it was announced that U.S. Olympic Gold Medalist Gable Steveson had reportedly signed a contract with WWE. Five days later, WWE confirmed they had signed Steveson to a Next In Line (NIL) deal. As part of the 2021 WWE Draft in October, Steveson was drafted to the Raw brand.

On the following Raw, Xavier Woods defeated The Miz due to an untimely assist by John Morrison. Afterwards, Miz turned on Morrison, ending their tag team.

Also on Raw, Eva Marie attacked Doudrop, ending their alliance. The two were supposed to have a match the following week, but Doudrop attacked Marie before the match. Doudrop would then defeat Marie on the September 13 and September 20 episodes of Raw. On the September 27 episode, in what would be Marie's last appearance before her release in November, Marie cost Doudrop the latter's Raw Women's Championship match.

On October 4, a championship rematch between new Raw Tag Team Champions RK-Bro (Randy Orton and Riddle) and AJ Styles and Omos was scheduled for Crown Jewel, where RK-Bro retained.

=== SmackDown ===
On the September 10 episode of SmackDown, Brock Lesnar again appeared to confront Roman Reigns and claimed that his former advocate, Paul Heyman, who had been serving as Reigns' special counsel since August 2020, knew Lesnar would be at SummerSlam in an attempt to cause dissension between Reigns and Heyman. Lesnar then challenged Heyman to accept a match against Reigns for the Universal Championship. Later that night, Reigns accepted the challenge. On September 16, WWE announced that the match would occur at Crown Jewel. Before that, however, Finn Bálor received his promised championship match against Reigns at Extreme Rules where Reigns defeated Bálor, who had competed in his "Demon" persona, to retain the title. At Crown Jewel, Reigns retained after interference from The Usos (Jey Uso and Jimmy Uso). Their next match would take place at Night 2 of WrestleMania 38 with Lesnar as WWE Champion after winning the title at Elimination Chamber. The match was a Winner Takes All Championship Unification match, which Reigns won to claim both titles and become recognized as the Undisputed WWE Universal Champion. They would have one further match at the following year's SummerSlam, this time as a Last Man Standing match, where Reigns retained.

On the first SmackDown after SummerSlam, Bianca Belair challenged Becky Lynch to a rematch for the SmackDown Women's Championship, however, Lynch refused. Belair then won a fatal four-way elimination match to become the number one contender. After Lynch refused to defend her title the next week, stating she would defend the title when she was ready, WWE officials Adam Pearce and Sonya Deville scheduled Lynch to defend the title against Belair at Extreme Rules. At that event, Sasha Banks made her return, and attacked both Belair and Lynch, thus the match was ruled a no contest. On October 1, a triple threat match between the three for the SmackDown Women's Championship was scheduled for Crown Jewel. Also, in the main event of that night's SmackDown, Belair and Banks had their one-on-one match, where Banks was victorious after interference from Lynch. At Crown Jewel, Lynch retained, though Belair was not involved in the decision. After Lynch and Belair were drafted to Raw during the 2021 WWE Draft (with Lynch subsequently trading championships with the Raw Women's Champion), Belair earned a Raw Women's Championship match at WrestleMania 38 by winning an Elimination Chamber match at Elimination Chamber. At Night 1 of WrestleMania 38, Belair defeated Lynch to win the title. They also had a match at the following year's SummerSlam, where Belair again retained. Afterwards, Lynch embraced Belair, turning face for the first time since May 2020.

Unsatisfied with his loss to Edge, Seth Rollins challenged Edge to a rematch that occurred on the September 10 episode of SmackDown that Rollins won. Rollins was still unsatisfied, however, as he continued to taunt Edge over the next few weeks and challenged him to return. After Rollins made it more personal by breaking into Edge's home, Edge challenged Rollins to a Hell in a Cell match, which was scheduled for Crown Jewel. At the event, Edge defeated Rollins, ending their feud in the process.

== Results ==
No.	Results	Stipulations	Times
1^{P}	Big E defeated Baron Corbin by pinfall	Singles match	6:35
2	RK-Bro (Randy Orton and Riddle) defeated AJ Styles and Omos (c) by pinfall	Tag team match for the WWE Raw Tag Team Championship	7:05
3	Alexa Bliss defeated Eva Marie (with Doudrop) by pinfall	Singles match	3:50
4	Damian Priest defeated Sheamus (c) by pinfall	Singles match for the WWE United States Championship	13:50
5	The Usos (Jey Uso and Jimmy Uso) (c) defeated The Mysterios (Rey Mysterio and Dominik Mysterio) by pinfall	Tag team match for the WWE SmackDown Tag Team Championship	10:50
6	Becky Lynch defeated Bianca Belair (c) by pinfall	Singles match for the WWE SmackDown Women's Championship	0:26
7	Drew McIntyre defeated Jinder Mahal by pinfall	Singles match Veer and Shanky were barred from ringside.	4:40
8	Charlotte Flair defeated Nikki A.S.H. (c) and Rhea Ripley by submission	Triple threat match for the WWE Raw Women's Championship	13:05
9	Edge defeated Seth Rollins by submission	Singles match	21:15
10	Bobby Lashley (c) (with MVP) defeated Goldberg by referee stoppage	Singles match for the WWE Championship	7:10
11	Roman Reigns (c) (with Paul Heyman) defeated John Cena by pinfall	Singles match for the WWE Universal Championship	22:59
(c) / – the champion(s) heading into the match; P / – the match was broadcast on the pre-show
