= SummerSlam =

WWE pay-per-view and livestreaming event series

- WWE SummerSlam logo used since 2023
- Created by: Vince McMahon
- Promotion: WWE
- Brands: Raw (2002–2011, 2016–present); SmackDown (2002–2011, 2016–present); 205 Live (2018–2019); ECW (2006–2009)
- Nickname: "The Biggest Party of the Summer"
- First event: 1988

SummerSlam is a professional wrestling event, produced annually since 1988 by the world's largest professional wrestling promotion, WWE. Dubbed "The Biggest Event of the Summer", it is considered WWE's second biggest event of the year behind their flagship event, WrestleMania. It is also considered one of the company's five biggest events of the year, along with WrestleMania, Royal Rumble, Survivor Series, and Money in the Bank, referred to as the "Big Five". The event has been broadcast on pay-per-view (PPV) since the inaugural 1988 event and via livestreaming since the 2014 event.

The inaugural SummerSlam took place on August 29, 1988, at Madison Square Garden in New York City. The 1992 event was the company's first major PPV to take place outside of North America with it being held at the original Wembley Stadium in London, England; it had a reported attendance of 80,355, which as of April 2023, WWE considers this to be their seventh largest live gate in history. From 2009 to 2014, SummerSlam was held at the Staples Center in Los Angeles, California and from 2015 to 2018, the event took place at the Barclays Center in the New York City borough of Brooklyn. Beginning with the 2021 event, SummerSlam has been held in National Football League stadiums across the United States. From its inception up through that 2021 event, SummerSlam was held annually in August. The 2022 event marked the first and thus far only time that the event was not held in August, as it was instead held in July, with SummerSlam returning to August with the 2023 edition. Beginning with the 2025 event, SummerSlam is now hosted as a double-night feature, a format originally exclusive to WrestleMania (beginning with WrestleMania 36 in 2020). This change was originally slated for the 2026 installment but eventually moved up by a year following the initial announcement.

During the COVID-19 pandemic in 2020, that year's SummerSlam was WWE's first PPV and livestreaming event produced from their bio-secure bubble, the WWE ThunderDome. After the promotion resumed live touring with fans in July 2021, that year's SummerSlam was promoted as the "biggest event of 2021" due to WrestleMania 37 having to be held at a reduced venue capacity. The 2021 SummerSlam in turn became the highest-grossing SummerSlam event of all time until that record was broken with the 2023 event, which also became the highest-grossing non-WrestleMania event for WWE.

== History ==
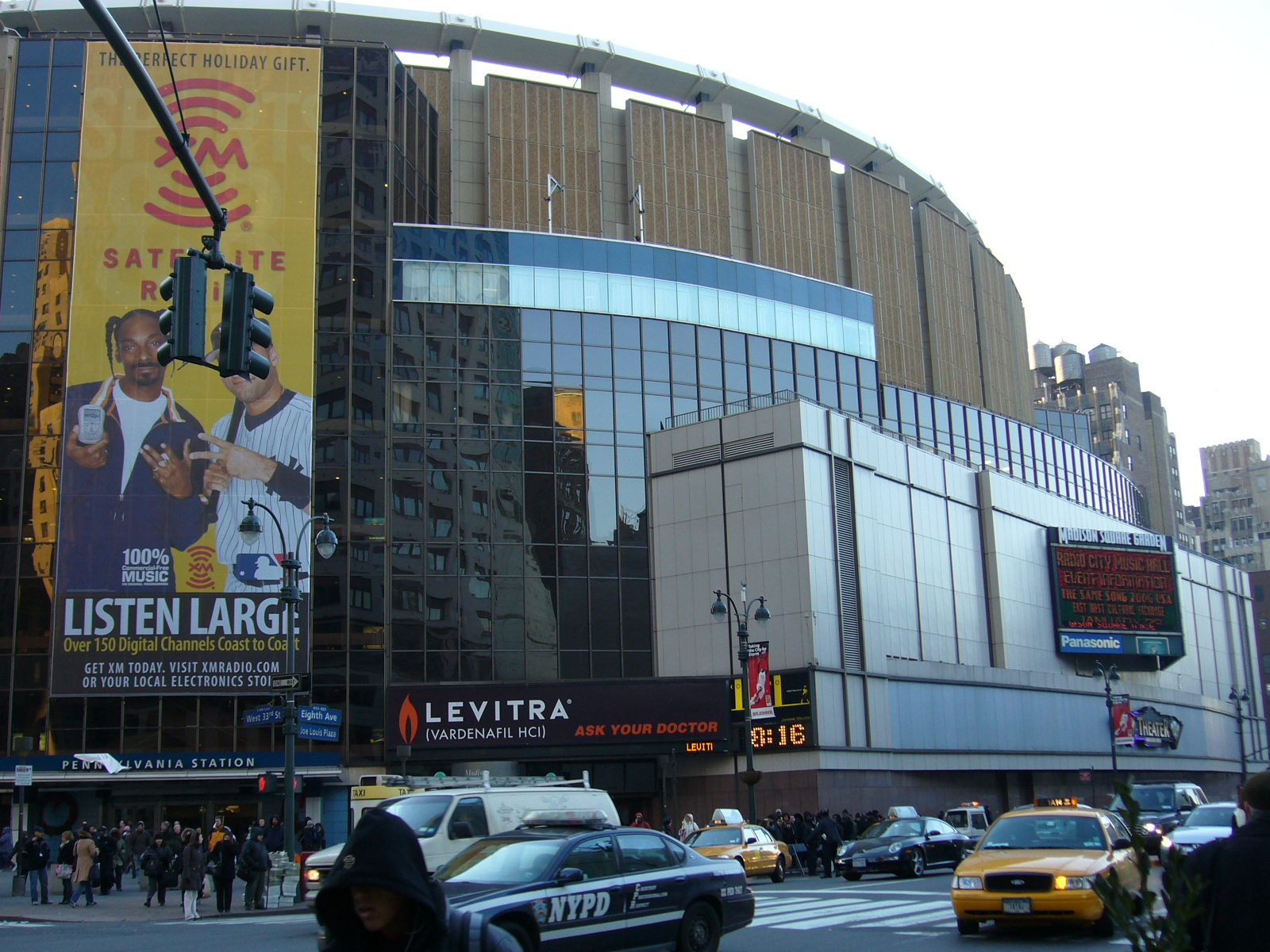
Madison Square Garden has hosted SummerSlam three times to date: 1988, 1991, and 1998

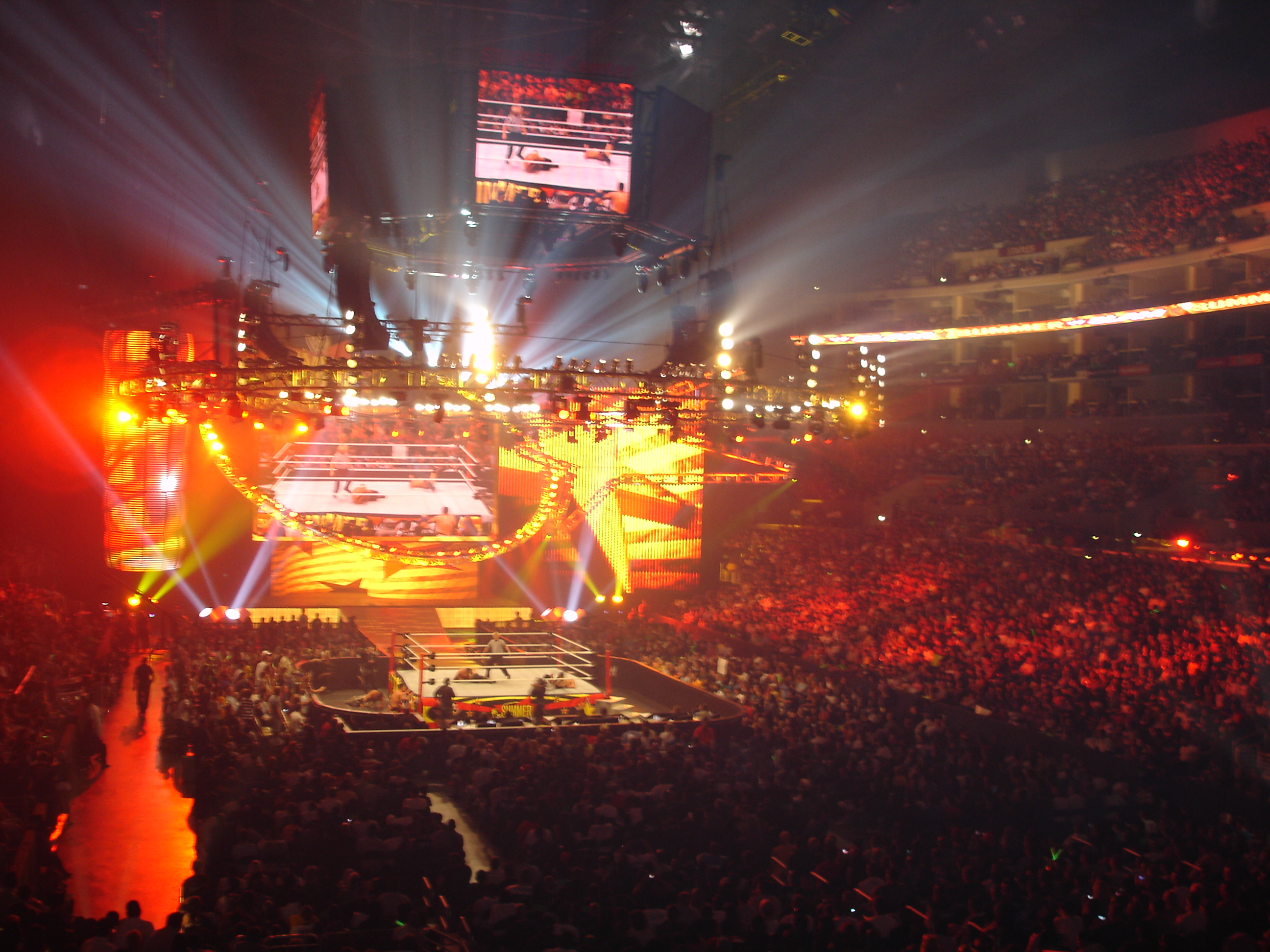
Staples Center hosted SummerSlam six years in a row: 2009–2014 and the tagline was California Sun

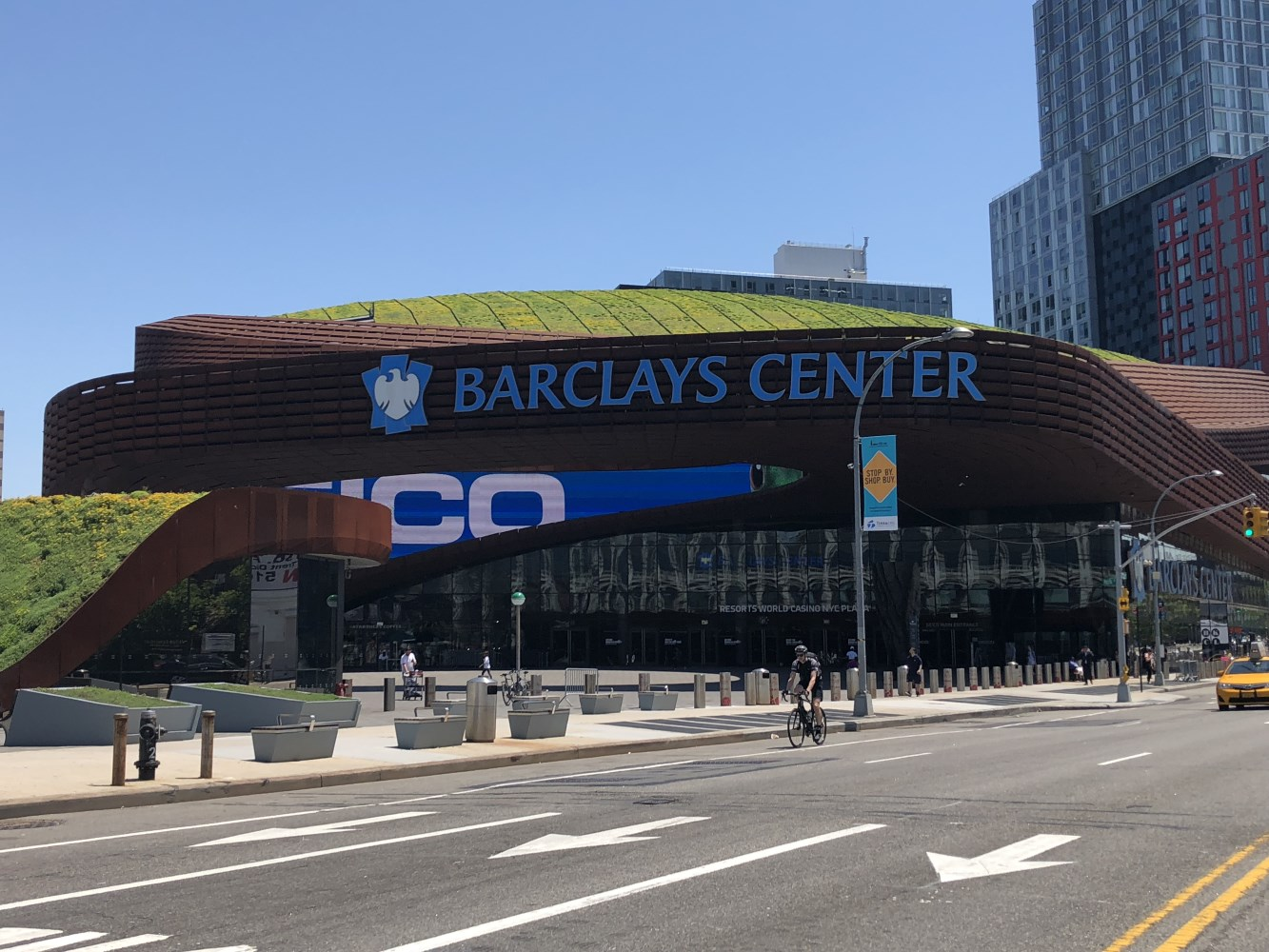
Barclays Center hosted SummerSlam four years in a row: 2015–2018

In the late 1980s, the World Wrestling Federation's (WWF) main competition in the professional wrestling industry was from the National Wrestling Alliance's (NWA) Jim Crockett Promotions. WWF Chairman Vince McMahon countered Jim Crockett's successful Starrcade pay-per-view (PPV) event, which began airing in 1983, by creating WrestleMania in 1985. After WrestleMania III in March 1987, the most successful professional wrestling pay-per-view event in history, McMahon created Survivor Series, which aired the same day as Starrcade in November 1987. After defeating Crockett in the ratings war, McMahon created the Royal Rumble, an event airing for free on the USA Network in January 1988, on the same night as the Crockett produced PPV Bunkhouse Stampede. The event set a ratings record for the network with eight million households tuning in to watch the event. In retaliation, Crockett created the Clash of the Champions I event, which aired simultaneously with WrestleMania IV. WrestleMania IV garnered higher ratings, and not long after, Crockett filed for bankruptcy and sold his company to Ted Turner, who rebranded it as World Championship Wrestling (WCW).

As the WWF continued to replace its closed circuit programming with pay-per-view programming, McMahon added more pay-per-views to the lineup to capitalize on the success of his previous events. In addition to WrestleMania in March/April, Survivor Series in November, and Royal Rumble in January, McMahon created an event for August, which he named SummerSlam. The inaugural SummerSlam was scheduled to be held on August 29, 1988, at Madison Square Garden in New York City, New York. To keep the WWF from having a pay-per-view market monopoly, Turner began airing monthly WCW pay-per-views. As a result, both companies brought in hundreds of millions of dollars of revenue.

Dubbed "The Biggest Party of the Summer", SummerSlam became one of the promotion's most successful events, eventually considered the second biggest event of the year, behind WrestleMania, and also one of the "Big Four" pay-per-views, along with WrestleMania, Survivor Series, and Royal Rumble, the promotion's original four annual events and their four biggest events of the year. From 1993 to 2002, it was considered one of the "Big Five", including King of the Ring, but that PPV event was discontinued after 2002 (albeit a one-off PPV event in 2024). In August 2021, Money in the Bank became recognized as one of the "Big Five".

In May 2002, the WWF was renamed to World Wrestling Entertainment (WWE) following a lawsuit with the World Wildlife Fund over the "WWF" initialism. In April 2011, the promotion ceased using its full name with the "WWE" abbreviation becoming an orphaned initialism. Also in March 2002, the promotion introduced the brand extension, in which the roster was divided between the Raw and SmackDown brands where wrestlers were exclusively assigned to perform—ECW became a third brand in 2006. The first brand extension was dissolved in August 2011, but it was reintroduced in July 2016. SummerSlam, along with the other original "Big Four" events, were the only PPVs to never be held exclusively for one brand during either brand split periods. In 2014, SummerSlam began to air on WWE's online streaming service, the WWE Network, which launched in February that year, and in 2021, the event became available on Peacock as the American version of the WWE Network merged under Peacock in March that year. Beginning with the 2026 event, SummerSlam began broadcasting on ESPN's new direct-to-consumer streaming service for US viewers as part of a five-year deal that began in September 2025 after WWE's deal with Peacock expired.

As a result of the COVID-19 pandemic in early 2020, WWE had to present the majority of its programming for Raw and SmackDown from a behind closed doors set at the WWE Performance Center in Orlando, Florida beginning mid-March. The 2020 SummerSlam was scheduled for August 23 at the TD Garden in Boston, Massachusetts, but it and the preceding night's NXT TakeOver event had to be relocated due to the pandemic. On August 17, WWE announced that SummerSlam would emanate from Orlando's Amway Center and it would be produced by way of a bio-secure bubble dubbed the WWE ThunderDome, which was first utilized for the August 21 episode of SmackDown. This made SummerSlam the first major WWE event to be held outside of the Performance Center since March 2020, as well as their first pay-per-view and livestreaming event produced from the ThunderDome. Inside the ThunderDome, drones, lasers, pyro, smoke, and projections were utilized to enhance wrestlers' entrances, and nearly 1,000 LED boards were installed to allow for rows and rows of virtual fans, who could register for a free virtual seat. Arena audio was also mixed with that of the virtual fans.

While SummerSlam has been considered WWE's second biggest event of the year for many years, in 2021, it was promoted as the promotion's biggest event of that year. WrestleMania 37 in April 2021, which was the promotion's first event with live fans since before the pandemic, had to be held at a reduced venue capacity due to the ongoing pandemic. In July 2021, WWE resumed live touring with fans, and in an effort to sell out that year's SummerSlam, which was held at the Allegiant Stadium in the Las Vegas suburb of Paradise, Nevada, WWE promoted SummerSlam as the "biggest event of 2021". The 2021 event in turn became the highest-grossing SummerSlam event at the time. Beginning with WrestleMania 36 in 2020, WWE began holding WrestleMania as a two-night event. SummerSlam would also expand to two nights beginning with the 2025 event, which was held at MetLife Stadium in East Rutherford, New Jersey on August 2 and 3, 2025; the 2026 edition had originally been announced as the first-ever two-night SummerSlam before WWE later announced that the 2025 event would be two nights.

From its inception in 1988 up through the 2021 event, SummerSlam had been held annually in August. The 2022 event, however, was the first SummerSlam to not be held in August, as it was instead held in July. It took place on Saturday, July 30, 2022, at the Nissan Stadium in Nashville, Tennessee. The 2023 event was scheduled for Saturday, August 5, 2023, at Ford Field in Detroit, Michigan, thus returning SummerSlam to the month of August. The 2023 event would break the 2021 event's record to become the highest-grossing SummerSlam of all time, as well as the highest-grossing event outside of WrestleMania.

In June 2024, WWE announced a partnership with the Indiana Sports Corp, which would see the 2025 Royal Rumble, as well as a future WrestleMania and SummerSlam, held at the Lucas Oil Stadium in Indianapolis, Indiana. In August 2026, it was reported that the Lucas Oil Stadium would host SummerSlam in 2029.

== Events ==
#	Event	Date	City	Venue	Main event match(es)	Ref.
1	SummerSlam (1988)	August 29, 1988	New York City, New York	Madison Square Garden	The Mega Powers (Hulk Hogan and "Macho Man" Randy Savage) vs. The Mega Bucks (André The Giant and "Million Dollar Man" Ted DiBiase) with Jesse "The Body" Ventura as the special guest referee	
2	SummerSlam (1989)	August 28, 1989	East Rutherford, New Jersey	Brendan Byrne Arena	Brutus Beefcake and Hulk Hogan vs. Randy Savage and Zeus	
3	SummerSlam (1990)	August 27, 1990	Philadelphia, Pennsylvania	Spectrum	Ultimate Warrior (c) vs. "Ravishing" Rick Rude in a Steel Cage match for the WWF World Heavyweight Championship	
4	SummerSlam (1991)	August 26, 1991	New York City, New York	Madison Square Garden	Hulk Hogan and Ultimate Warrior vs. Sgt. Slaughter, General Adnan, and Colonel Mustafa in a Handicap elimination match with Sid Justice as the special guest referee	
5	SummerSlam (1992)	August 29, 1992 (Aired August 31, 1992)	London, England	Wembley Stadium	Bret "The Hitman" Hart (c) vs. The British Bulldog for the WWF Intercontinental Heavyweight Championship	
6	SummerSlam (1993)	August 30, 1993	Auburn Hills, Michigan	The Palace of Auburn Hills	Yokozuna (c) vs. Lex Luger for the WWF World Heavyweight Championship	
7	SummerSlam (1994)	August 29, 1994	Chicago, Illinois	United Center	The Undertaker vs. "The Undertaker"	
8	SummerSlam (1995)	August 27, 1995	Pittsburgh, Pennsylvania	Civic Arena	Diesel (c) vs. King Mabel for the WWF World Heavyweight Championship	
9	SummerSlam (1996)	August 18, 1996	Cleveland, Ohio	Gund Arena	Shawn Michaels (c) vs. Vader for the WWF World Heavyweight Championship	
10	SummerSlam (1997)	August 3, 1997	East Rutherford, New Jersey	Continental Airlines Arena	The Undertaker (c) vs. Bret Hart for the WWF World Heavyweight Championship with Shawn Michaels as the special guest referee	
11	SummerSlam (1998)	August 30, 1998	New York City, New York	Madison Square Garden	Stone Cold Steve Austin (c) vs. The Undertaker for the WWF Championship	
12	SummerSlam (1999)	August 22, 1999	Minneapolis, Minnesota	Target Center	Stone Cold Steve Austin (c) vs. Mankind vs. Triple H in a Triple Threat match for the WWF Championship with Jesse Ventura as the special guest referee	
13	SummerSlam (2000)	August 27, 2000	Raleigh, North Carolina	Raleigh Entertainment and Sports Arena	The Rock (c) vs. Kurt Angle vs. Triple H in a Triple Threat match for the WWF Championship	
14	SummerSlam (2001)	August 19, 2001	San Jose, California	Compaq Center	Booker T (c) vs. The Rock for the WCW Championship	
15	SummerSlam (2002)	August 25, 2002	Uniondale, New York	Nassau Coliseum	The Rock (c) vs. Brock Lesnar for the WWE Undisputed Championship	
16	SummerSlam (2003)	August 24, 2003	Phoenix, Arizona	America West Arena	Triple H (c) vs. Chris Jericho vs. Goldberg vs. Kevin Nash vs. Randy Orton vs. Shawn Michaels in an Elimination Chamber match for the World Heavyweight Championship	
17	SummerSlam (2004)	August 15, 2004	Toronto, Ontario, Canada	Air Canada Centre	Chris Benoit (c) vs. Randy Orton for the World Heavyweight Championship	
18	SummerSlam (2005)	August 21, 2005	Washington, D.C.	MCI Center	Hulk Hogan vs. Shawn Michaels	
19	SummerSlam (2006)	August 20, 2006	Boston, Massachusetts	TD Banknorth Garden	Edge (c) vs. John Cena for the WWE Championship	
20	SummerSlam (2007)	August 26, 2007	East Rutherford, New Jersey	Continental Airlines Arena	John Cena (c) vs. Randy Orton for the WWE Championship	
21	SummerSlam (2008)	August 17, 2008	Indianapolis, Indiana	Conseco Fieldhouse	Edge vs. The Undertaker in a Hell in a Cell match	
22	SummerSlam (2009)	August 23, 2009	Los Angeles, California	Staples Center	Jeff Hardy (c) vs. CM Punk in a Tables, Ladders, and Chairs match for the World Heavyweight Championship	
23	SummerSlam (2010)	August 15, 2010	Los Angeles, California	Staples Center	Team WWE (John Cena, Bret Hart, Chris Jericho, Daniel Bryan, Edge, John Morrison, and R-Truth) vs. The Nexus (Wade Barrett, Darren Young, David Otunga, Heath Slater, Justin Gabriel, Michael Tarver, and Skip Sheffield)	
24	SummerSlam (2011)	August 14, 2011	Los Angeles, California	Staples Center	CM Punk (c) vs. John Cena (c) for the Undisputed WWE Championship with Triple H as the special guest referee then CM Punk (c) vs. Alberto Del Rio for the WWE Championship in Del Rio's Money in the Bank cash-in match	
25	SummerSlam (2012)	August 19, 2012	Los Angeles, California	Staples Center	Brock Lesnar vs. Triple H in a No Disqualification match	
26	SummerSlam (2013)	August 18, 2013	Los Angeles, California	Staples Center	John Cena (c) vs. Daniel Bryan for the WWE Championship with Triple H as the special guest referee then Daniel Bryan (c) vs. Randy Orton for the WWE Championship with Triple H as the special guest referee in Orton's Money in the Bank cash-in match	
27	SummerSlam (2014)	August 17, 2014	Los Angeles, California	Staples Center	John Cena (c) vs. Brock Lesnar for the WWE World Heavyweight Championship	
28	SummerSlam (2015)	August 23, 2015	Brooklyn, New York	Barclays Center	Brock Lesnar vs. The Undertaker	
29	SummerSlam (2016)	August 21, 2016	Brooklyn, New York	Barclays Center	Brock Lesnar vs. Randy Orton	
30	SummerSlam (2017)	August 20, 2017	Brooklyn, New York	Barclays Center	Brock Lesnar (c) vs. Braun Strowman vs. Roman Reigns vs. Samoa Joe in a fatal four-way match for the WWE Universal Championship	
31	SummerSlam (2018)	August 19, 2018	Brooklyn, New York	Barclays Center	Brock Lesnar (c) vs. Roman Reigns for the WWE Universal Championship	
32	SummerSlam (2019)	August 11, 2019	Toronto, Ontario, Canada	Scotiabank Arena	Brock Lesnar (c) vs. Seth Rollins for the WWE Universal Championship	
33	SummerSlam (2020)	August 23, 2020	Orlando, Florida (Note: The SummerSlam was originally scheduled to be held at TD Garden in Boston, Massachusetts.)	WWE ThunderDome at Amway Center	Braun Strowman (c) vs. "The Fiend" Bray Wyatt in a Falls Count Anywhere match for the WWE Universal Championship	
34	SummerSlam (2021)	August 21, 2021	Paradise, Nevada	Allegiant Stadium	Roman Reigns (c) vs. John Cena for the WWE Universal Championship	
35	SummerSlam (2022)	July 30, 2022	Nashville, Tennessee	Nissan Stadium	Roman Reigns (c) vs. Brock Lesnar in a Last Man Standing match for the Undisputed WWE Universal Championship	
36	SummerSlam (2023)	August 5, 2023	Detroit, Michigan	Ford Field	Roman Reigns (c) vs. Jey Uso in Tribal Combat for the Undisputed WWE Universal Championship and recognition of Tribal Chief of the Anoaʻi family	
37	SummerSlam (2024)	August 3, 2024	Cleveland, Ohio	Cleveland Browns Stadium	Cody Rhodes (c) vs. Solo Sikoa in a Bloodline Rules match for the Undisputed WWE Championship	
38	SummerSlam (2025)	August 2, 2025	East Rutherford, New Jersey	MetLife Stadium	Gunther (c) vs. CM Punk for the World Heavyweight Championship then CM Punk (c) vs. Seth Rollins for the World Heavyweight Championship in Rollins' Money in the Bank cash-in match	
38	SummerSlam (2025)	August 3, 2025	East Rutherford, New Jersey	MetLife Stadium	John Cena (c) vs. Cody Rhodes in a Street Fight for the Undisputed WWE Championship	
39	SummerSlam (2026)	August 1, 2026	Minneapolis, Minnesota	U.S. Bank Stadium	Brock Lesnar vs. Oba Femi in a Hell in a Cell match	
39	SummerSlam (2026)	August 2, 2026	Minneapolis, Minnesota	U.S. Bank Stadium	Roman Reigns (c) vs. Seth Rollins for the World Heavyweight Championship	
42	SummerSlam (2029)	TBA	Indianapolis, Indiana	Lucas Oil Stadium	TBA	
42	SummerSlam (2029)	TBA	Indianapolis, Indiana	Lucas Oil Stadium	TBA	
(c) – refers to the champion(s) heading into the match
