= SummerSlam (2022) =

WWE premium live event

- Promotional poster featuring Roman Reigns and Brock Lesnar
- Promotion: WWE
- Brand(s): Raw; SmackDown
- Date: July 30, 2022
- City: Nashville, Tennessee
- Venue: Nissan Stadium
- Attendance: 48,449

WWE event chronology
← Previous; Money in the Bank	Next → Clash at the Castle

SummerSlam chronology
← Previous; 2021	Next → 2023

The 2022 SummerSlam was a professional wrestling premium live event (PLE) produced by WWE, held for wrestlers from the promotion's main roster brands, Raw and SmackDown. It was the 35th annual SummerSlam and took place on Saturday, July 30, 2022, at Nissan Stadium in Nashville, Tennessee. This was the first and only SummerSlam to not be held during the month of August.

Eight matches were contested at the event. In the main event, Roman Reigns defeated Brock Lesnar in a Last Man Standing match to retain the Undisputed WWE Universal Championship, which was billed as their final match against each other. In other prominent matches, Pat McAfee defeated Happy Corbin, Logan Paul defeated The Miz, The Usos (Jey Uso and Jimmy Uso) defeated The Street Profits (Angelo Dawkins and Montez Ford) to retain the Undisputed WWE Tag Team Championship, Liv Morgan defeated Ronda Rousey to retain the SmackDown Women's Championship in a conflicted ending, and in the opening bout, Bianca Belair defeated Becky Lynch to retain the Raw Women's Championship. The event also saw the returns of Bayley, Dakota Kai (who had been released from her WWE contract in April), Io Shirai, and Edge.

This was the first SummerSlam to be branded as a "premium live event", a term the company introduced at the start of the year to refer to its events airing on traditional pay-per-view and via WWE's livestreaming platforms, as well as the first SummerSlam to livestream on Disney+ Hotstar in Indonesia, following the shutdown if its version of the WWE Network in late January. This was also WWE's first PLE following the retirement of WWE owner Vince McMahon, who had served as chairman and chief executive officer of the company since 1982. McMahon announced his retirement on July 22, eight days before SummerSlam; however, he returned as Executive Chairman in January 2023 before severing ties with the company in 2024.

The event received positive reviews from critics, who, along with fans, lauded the main event, and welcomed the new creative direction the company was taking. Praise was also directed to Logan Paul's performance and the Raw Women's Championship match, but criticism was directed at the Undisputed WWE Tag Team Championship match, the SmackDown Women's Championship match, and the United States Championship match.

== Production ==
=== Background ===
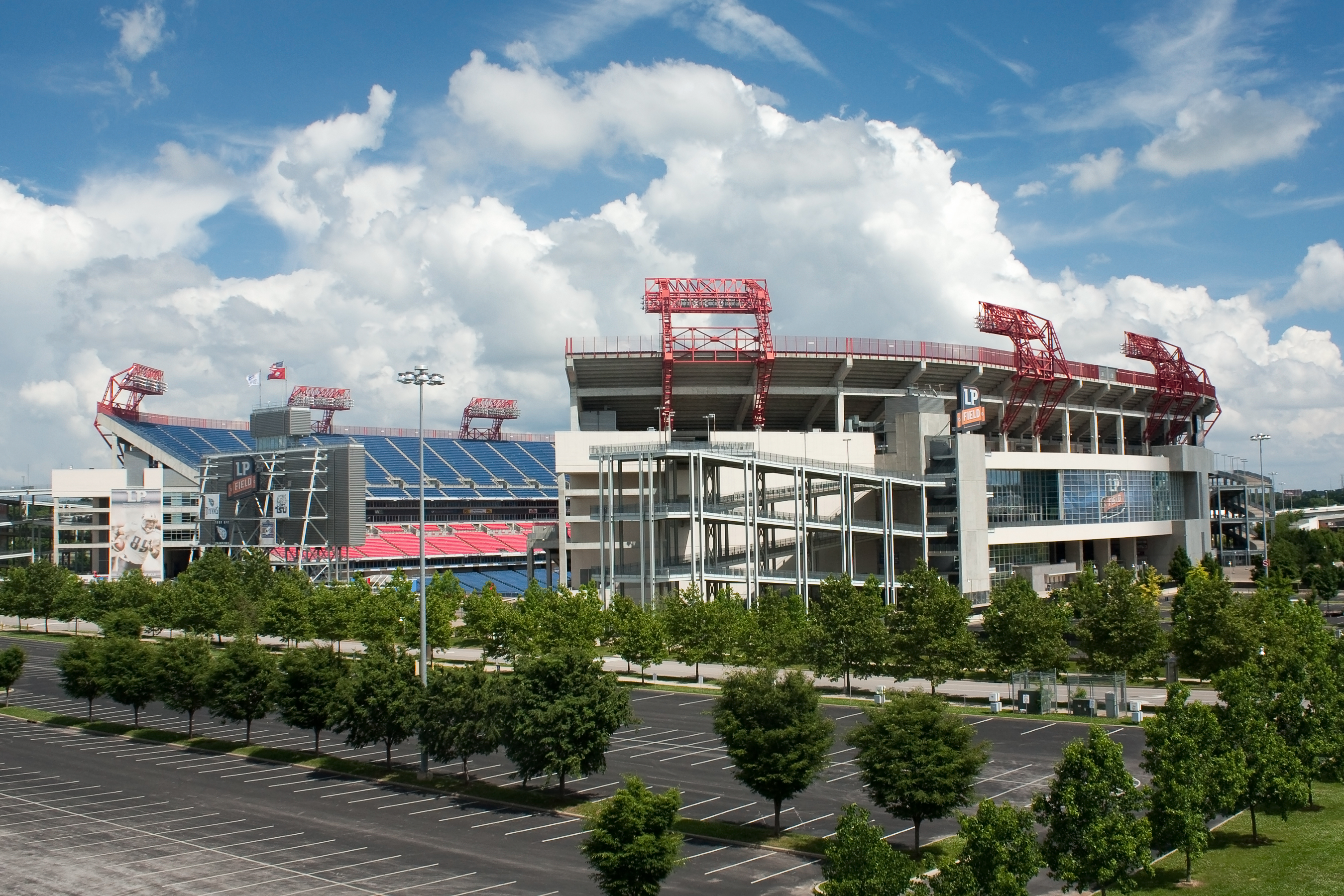
The 35th annual SummerSlam was held at Nissan Stadium in Nashville, Tennessee.

SummerSlam is an annual professional wrestling premium live event (PLE) traditionally held in August by WWE since 1988. It was originally broadcast exclusively via pay-per-view (PPV) before it began simulcasting on WWE's livestreaming platforms in 2014. Dubbed "The Biggest Party of the Summer", it is one of the promotion's original four PPVs, along with WrestleMania, Royal Rumble, and Survivor Series, referred to as the "Big Four", and as of August 2021, it is considered one of the "Big Five", along with Money in the Bank. Out of the five, it is considered WWE's second biggest event of the year behind WrestleMania.

Announced on October 25, 2021, the 35th SummerSlam was scheduled to take place on Saturday, July 30, 2022, at Nissan Stadium in Nashville, Tennessee, and featured wrestlers from the Raw and SmackDown brand divisions. This marked the first SummerSlam to not be held during the month of August. Tickets went on sale on April 22, with premium hospitality packages also available. It was also the first SummerSlam since 2011 to incorporate a new logo and the first since 2008 to not feature the Star background of the logo. This was also the first SummerSlam to be branded as a "premium live event", a term the company introduced on January 1 to refer to its events that are available on PPV and via livestreaming.

Eight days before SummerSlam on July 22, WWE owner Vince McMahon announced his retirement from the company. He had served as chairman and chief executive officer (CEO) since 1982. The 2022 SummerSlam was in turn WWE's first PLE following his retirement. Stephanie McMahon and WWE President Nick Khan took over as co-CEOs, and the former also took over as Chairwoman of WWE. However, on January 10, 2023, Stephanie announced her resignation as co-CEO and chairwoman, with Nick Khan being the sole CEO and Vince returning as Executive Chairman.

=== Broadcast outlets ===
The PLE was broadcast on traditional PPV outlets worldwide. It was also available to livestream on Peacock in the United States, SonyLIV in India, Disney+ Hotstar in Indonesia, and the WWE Network everywhere else. This was the first SummerSlam to livestream on Disney+ Hotstar in Indonesia, following the shutdown of its version of the WWE Network in late January.

=== Storylines ===
The event included matches that resulted from scripted storylines. Results were predetermined by WWE's writers on the Raw and SmackDown brands, while storylines were produced on WWE's weekly television shows, Monday Night Raw and Friday Night SmackDown.

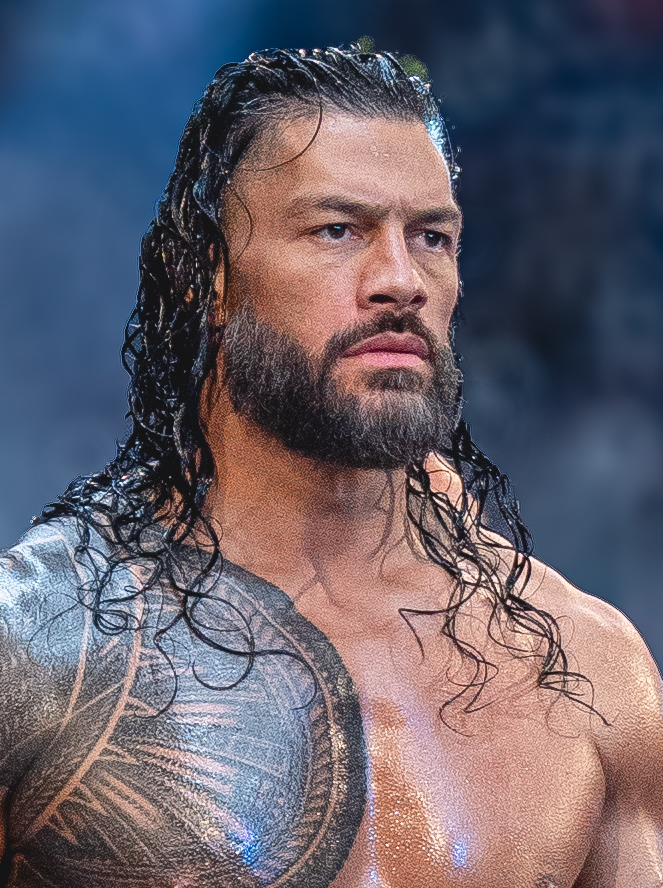
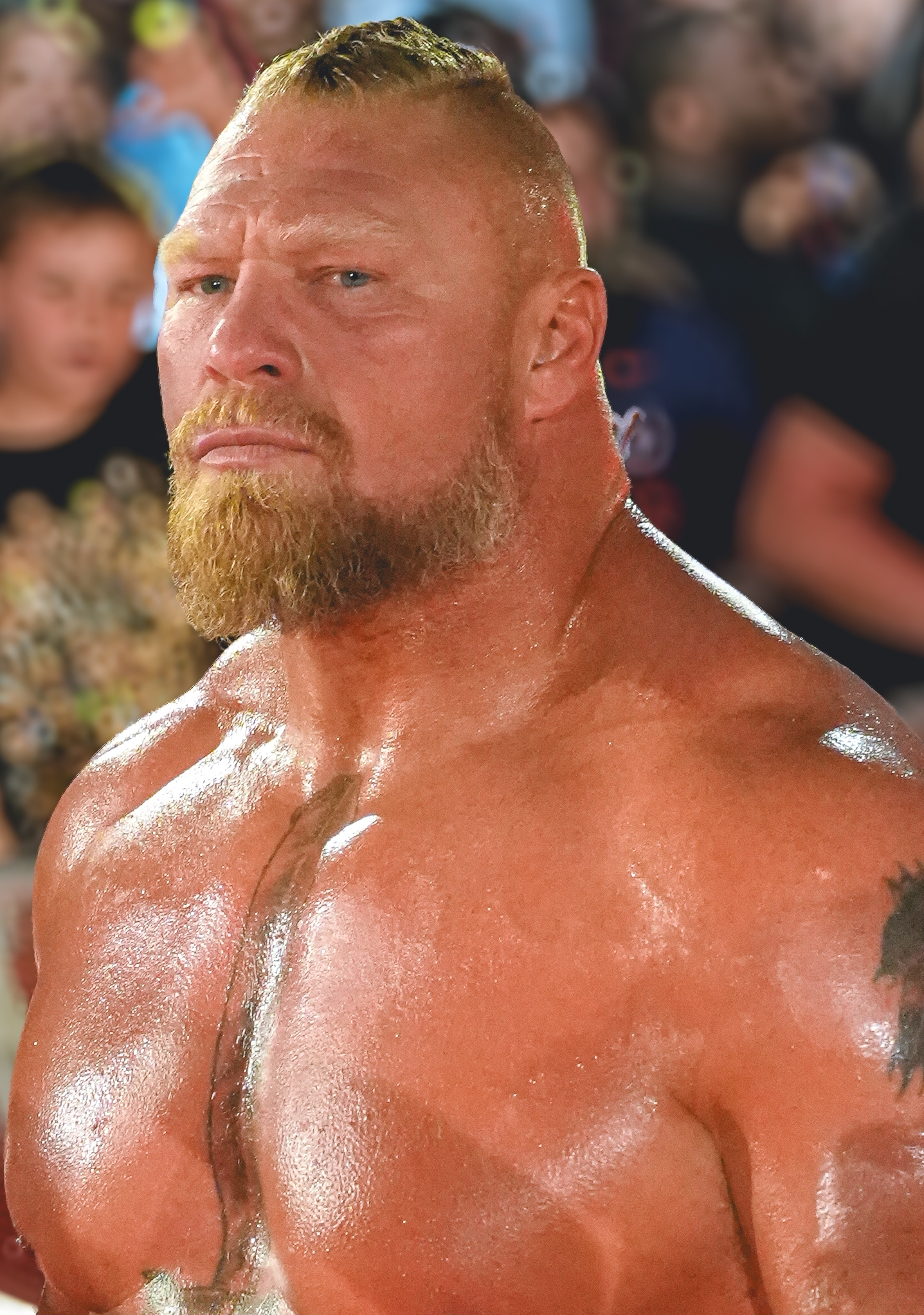
In their last match against each other, Roman Reigns defended the Undisputed WWE Universal Championship against Brock Lesnar in a Last Man Standing match in the main event.

At WrestleMania 38 in April, SmackDown's Universal Champion Roman Reigns defeated Raw's WWE Champion Brock Lesnar in a Winner Takes All match to become recognized as the Undisputed WWE Universal Champion. After Reigns retained the Undisputed WWE Universal Championship on the June 17 episode of SmackDown, he claimed there was no one left to face him. Lesnar then made a surprise return after a two-month hiatus and offered Reigns a handshake. As Reigns went to shake his hand, Lesnar attacked Reigns and then attacked The Usos (Jey Uso and Jimmy Uso), who had come to Reigns's aid. It was subsequently announced that Reigns would defend the Undisputed WWE Universal Championship against Lesnar in a Last Man Standing match at SummerSlam, which WWE billed as their last match against each other.

On the June 17 episode of SmackDown, after losing to Madcap Moss, Happy Corbin confronted commentator Pat McAfee—a former teammate when both played in the National Football League who consistently criticized Corbin on-air for his underhanded tactics. The following week, McAfee challenged Corbin to a match at SummerSlam. After Money in the Bank went off the air, Corbin attacked McAfee and subsequently accepted the challenge.

At Money in the Bank, Bobby Lashley defeated Theory to win the United States Championship. On the following episode of Raw, Theory announced he was granted a rematch against Lashley for the title at SummerSlam.

At Money in the Bank, The Usos (Jey Uso and Jimmy Uso) defeated The Street Profits (Angelo Dawkins and Montez Ford) to retain the Undisputed WWE Tag Team Championship. Following the match, replayed footage of the pinfall showed that Ford's shoulder was off the mat, thus the pinfall should not have been counted. A championship rematch was then subsequently scheduled for SummerSlam. On the July 15 episode of SmackDown, after Dawkins defeated Jimmy despite Jimmy's shoulder being off the mat, WWE official Adam Pearce announced that WWE Hall of Famer and Nashville area native Jeff Jarrett would be the special guest referee for the match.

At Money in the Bank, Raw's Liv Morgan won the women's Money in the Bank ladder match to earn a contract for a women's championship match of her choosing. After Ronda Rousey retained the SmackDown Women's Championship later that same night, Morgan ran out and used the contract to cash in on Rousey and win the title. On the following SmackDown, it was announced that Morgan would defend the title in a rematch against Rousey at SummerSlam.

At WrestleMania 38, social media influencer Logan Paul teamed with The Miz in a tag team match in which they were victorious. However, displeased that Paul scored the pinfall, Miz turned on and attacked Paul. In June, photos began surfacing of Paul training for an in-ring return and then on June 30, it was announced that Paul had officially signed with WWE. In a short video following the announcement, Paul said he was coming for The Miz. Paul then appeared on the July 18 episode of Raw to confront Miz and challenged him to a match at SummerSlam. Miz initially rejected, but after being goaded by Paul, Miz accepted.

At the previous year's SummerSlam, Becky Lynch made a surprise return from maternity leave and faced Bianca Belair in an impromptu match where she defeated Belair in 26 seconds to win the SmackDown Women's Championship. The two would face each other again at WrestleMania 38, this time for Lynch's Raw Women's Championship, where Belair was victorious. Over the next few months, Lynch failed various attempts to regain the championship. On the July 11 episode of Raw, during Belair's title defense, Lynch caused Belair to lose via countout, but Belair retained the title. The following week, Lynch stated that whoever was the champion by the end of the night would defend the title against her at SummerSlam. Lynch then attacked Belair, with the women's championship match occurring immediately afterwards. Belair again retained, keeping her as the defending champion heading into her match against Lynch at SummerSlam, with Belair vowing to rewrite what happened at SummerSlam the previous year.

On the June 27 episode of Raw, The Mysterios (Rey Mysterio and Dominik Mysterio) were confronted backstage by Judgment Day members Damian Priest and Finn Bálor, who wanted Dominik to join their faction. This led to a match between the two teams for the following week, where Priest and Bálor attacked The Mysterios before the match began, but The Mysterios were still able to defeat Priest and Bálor with an Eddie Guerrero chair trick. The following week, Bálor and Priest confronted Dominik backstage, suggesting that he join The Judgment Day. This led to a match between Bálor and Rey, where Bálor won. On the July 18 episode, after Judgment Day again suggested Dominik join their group, Priest defeated Rey. After the match, Priest and Bálor threatened Rey with a Con-chair-to, but Dominik made the save. On the final Raw before SummerSlam, in what was Rey's 20-year anniversary of his WWE debut, Rey and Dominik defeated Bálor and Priest. While they were celebrating backstage, however, Priest and Rhea Ripley, also from Judgment Day, attacked them, with Priest sending Rey through a table. Later that night, a No Disqualification tag team match pitting The Mysterios against Bálor and Priest was made official for SummerSlam.

== Event ==
Other on-screen personnel
Role:	Name:
English commentators	Michael Cole (SmackDown)
English commentators	Jimmy Smith (Raw)
English commentators	Corey Graves (all matches)
English commentators	Byron Saxton (Raw)
Spanish commentators	Marcelo Rodriguez
Spanish commentators	Jerry Soto
Ring announcers	Mike Rome (Raw/Main event)
Ring announcers	Samantha Irvin (SmackDown)
Referees	Danilo Anfibio
Referees	Dan Engler
Referees	Jeff Jarrett
Referees	Daphanie LaShaunn
Referees	Eddie Orengo
Referees	Chad Patton
Referees	Charles Robinson
Referees	Rod Zapata
Interviewers	Sarah Schreiber
Interviewers	Jackie Redmond
Pre-show panel	Kayla Braxton
Pre-show panel	Kevin Patrick
Pre-show panel	Peter Rosenberg
Pre-show panel	Booker T
Pre-show panel	Jerry Lawler

=== Preliminary matches ===
The PLE opened with Bianca Belair defending the Raw Women's Championship against Becky Lynch. Early in the match, Belair accidentally legitimately dislocated Lynch's shoulder. Outside the ring, Lynch countered a Kiss of Death from Belair and attacked Belair near the timekeeper's area. Lynch performed Diamond Dust on Belair for a nearfall. Later, Belair performed a Kiss Of Death on Lynch outside the ring. Belair intended for a countout victory, however, Lynch rolled back in the ring at nine. Lynch pulled Belair, who was atop a turnbuckle, into the ring by the latter's braid and performed a Manhandle Slam for a nearfall. In the closing moments, as Lynch attempted a second Manhandle Slam from the middle rope, Belair countered into a Spanish Fly and the Kiss of Death on Lynch to retain the title. Following the match, Belair and Lynch shook hands and embraced each other. Bayley then made her return for the first time since July 2021 to confront Belair. She was accompanied by a returning Dakota Kai (who had been released from her WWE contract in April) and Io Shirai (who was billed under the new ring name "Iyo Sky", stylized in all caps), both making their main roster debuts. Sky and Kai turned into heels by siding with Bayley, who attempted to taunt Belair. Lynch then sided with Belair, thus Lynch turned face for the first time since May 2020. Bayley, Sky, and Kai then retreated while Lynch and Belair continued to show mutual respect to each other.

Next, Logan Paul faced The Miz (accompanied by Maryse and Ciampa). During the match, Paul applied the figure-four leglock on Miz, however, Miz reached the ropes to void the submission. Paul performed a Crossbody and standing moonsault on Miz for a nearfall. Ciampa attempted to attack Paul only for the referee to catch him. Although the referee sent Ciampa backstage, Ciampa refused to comply and obtained a steel chair to sit. AJ Styles then came out and attacked Ciampa from behind. Paul performed a Phenomenal Forearm on Miz for a nearfall. Paul then performed a Frog Splash on Miz through the announce table. In the end, as Paul attempted a pin on Miz, Maryse distracted the referee. As Miz attempted to attack Paul with a necklace, he almost struck Maryse, who stood on the ring apron, however, Paul took advantage and performed a Skull Crushing Finale on Miz in the ring to win the match.

After that, Bobby Lashley defended the United States Championship against Theory. During Lashley's entrance, Theory attacked Lashley with the Money in the Bank briefcase. Midway through the match, Theory attempted to walk away from the match, however, Lashley intercepted him. Lashley performed a Running Powerslam on Theory. As Lashley attempted a spear on Theory, Theory leapt over Lashley. In the end, Lashley applied the Hurt Lock on Theory, who submitted, thus Lashley retained the title.

The next match saw The Mysterios (Rey Mysterio and Dominik Mysterio) face The Judgment Day (Finn Bálor and Damian Priest, accompanied by Rhea Ripley) in a No Disqualification tag team match. In the closing moments, former Judgment Day leader Edge made his return and performed a Spear on Priest and Bàlor. The Mysterios then performed a double 619 on Bàlor. Rey followed with a Frog Splash on Bálor to win the match.

Next, Happy Corbin fought Pat McAfee. In the closing moments, as Corbin attempted End of Days on McAfee, McAfee performed a right hand on Corbin, who inadvertently incapacitated the referee. McAfee performed a low blow and a Powerbomb on Corbin to win the match.

Following that, Drew McIntyre came out to cut a promo where he spoke about his upcoming Undisputed WWE Universal Championship match at Clash at the Castle. McIntyre stated that it did not matter who won the main event that night as he would defeat them at Clash at the Castle to become champion.

Next, The Usos (Jey Uso and Jimmy Uso) defended the Undisputed WWE Tag Team Championship against The Street Profits (Angelo Dawkins and Montez Ford), with WWE Hall of Famer Jeff Jarrett as the special guest referee. In the end, The Usos performed the 1D on Dawkins to retain the titles.

Following that, Matt Riddle came out and called out Seth "Freakin" Rollins; they were originally scheduled to face each other at SummerSlam, however, Riddle was injured by Rollins on the Raw before the event, thus Riddle was not medically cleared. Rollins came out, however, WWE officials came out to warn Rollins. Rollins and Riddle eventually fought which ended with Rollins performing a Stomp on Riddle. It was later revealed that this match was canceled due to Riddle failing a drug test.

In the penultimate match, Liv Morgan defended the SmackDown Women's Championship against Ronda Rousey. Early in the match, Morgan performed a Codebreaker on Rousey. As Morgan attempted an Ob-Livion on Rousey, Rousey countered and applied the armbar on Morgan only for Morgan to reach the ropes to void the submission. In the closing moments, as Rousey applied the armbar on Morgan once again, Rousey's shoulders were on the mat. The referee counted the pin, however, he did not notice Morgan tap out before the three count, thus Morgan retained the title. Following the match, an irate Rousey attacked Morgan and the referee, turning heel for the first time since 2019.

=== Main event ===
In the main event, Roman Reigns (accompanied by Paul Heyman) defended the Undisputed WWE Universal Championship against Brock Lesnar in a Last Man Standing match. Lesnar drove a tractor towards the ring for his entrance. Lesnar jumped off the tractor onto Reigns and performed German Suplexes on Reigns at ringside. As Heyman distracted Lesnar, Reigns took advantage and performed a Samoan Drop on Lesnar through a table set up at ringside, who stood up at seven. Reigns put Lesnar through another table, who stood up at seven. Reigns performed two Superman Punches and a spear on Lesnar, who stood up at seven. Lesnar attempted an F-5 on Reigns, however, Reigns countered and threw Lesnar out of the ring. Lesnar attacked Reigns with the steel steps and a broken piece of a table, who got up at nine. Lesnar threw Reigns in the front loader of the tractor and dumped Reigns back in the ring, after which, Lesnar performed German Suplexes on Reigns, who got up at eight. Lesnar then performed an F-5 on Reigns, who got up at nine. As Lesnar attempted another F-5 on Reigns, Reigns countered into the Guillotine, however, Lesnar countered into his own Guillotine on Reigns, who got up at nine. Lesnar then drove the tractor into the ring, lifting the ring, toppling Reigns, who got up at nine. The Usos (Jey Uso and Jimmy Uso) then came out to aid Reigns and attacked Lesnar, however, Lesnar took out The Usos. Heyman then taunted Lesnar with the titles, who responded by performing an F-5 on Heyman through the announce table. Reigns speared a distracted Lesnar and moments later, Austin Theory came out with his Money in the Bank briefcase and attempted to cash in, however, Lesnar intercepted Theory with an F-5. The Usos then performed superkicks on Lesnar, who got up at nine. Reigns performed a Spear on Lesnar, who got up at nine. An irate Reigns attacked Lesnar with Theory's Money in the Bank briefcase, who still stood up at nine. Reigns then struck Lesnar with the WWE title belt, who stood up at nine. In the closing moments, Reigns attacked Lesnar, this time with the Universal title belt, and proceeded with The Usos to place pieces of the broken announce table, steel chairs and amplifier on a battered Lesnar and stood on the debris for the ten count to end their 7-year rivalry.

== Reception ==
The event was met with positive reviews from critics, who welcomed the company's new creative direction and lauded the main event. WWE reported on the Raw after SummerSlam that it had surpassed 1.3 billion video views on social media for the event. Brent Brookhouse of CBS Sports praised the event and also gave his highest ratings of letter grade A to the Reigns vs. Lesnar main event match. Wrestling journalist Dave Meltzer of the Wrestling Observer Newsletter rated the Raw Women's Championship bout and the Logan vs. Miz match 4 stars, the United States title match 1.5 stars, the No DQ tag team match and the Undisputed WWE Tag Team title match 3.5 stars, the McAfee-Corbin bout 3 stars, the SmackDown Women's Championship match 1 star (the lowest rated match on the card), and the main event 4.5 stars (the highest rated match on the card).

== Aftermath ==
The 2022 SummerSlam would be the only SummerSlam to take place in July, as the following year's event returned to August.

=== Raw ===
After SummerSlam, the trio of Bayley, Dakota Kai, and Iyo Sky would dub themselves as Damage CTRL, and they continued to target Raw Women's Champion Bianca Belair. This led to a six-woman tag team match at Clash at the Castle, where Damage CTRL defeated Belair's team in which Bayley pinned Belair. Due to pinning the champion, Bayley challenged Belair to a ladder match for the title at Extreme Rules, and Belair accepted.

On the following Raw, Damage CTRL (Bayley, Dakota Kai, and Iyo Sky) attacked Becky Lynch backstage. This was done to write Lynch off television due to her dislocated shoulder. Lynch made her return in November, and led her team in defeating Damage CTRL's team in a WarGames match at Survivor Series WarGames. Over the next few weeks, Damage CTRL continued their feud with Lynch, and WWE Hall of Famers Lita and Trish Stratus would side with Lynch, leading to a six-woman tag team match at Night 1 of WrestleMania 39, which was won by Lita, Stratus, and Lynch.

On the August 15 episode of Raw, Matt Riddle revealed that he was medically cleared. Later that same night, Riddle engaged into another brawl with Seth "Freakin" Rollins before challenging him to a match at Clash at the Castle, which was made official.

After SummerSlam, The Mysterios (Rey Mysterio and Dominik Mysterio) and Edge continued feuding with The Judgment Day (Finn Bálor, Damian Priest, and Rhea Ripley), leading to Edge and Rey teaming up to face Bálor and Priest at Clash at the Castle. At the event, Edge and Rey defeated Judgment Day, but after the match, Dominik turned on both Edge and Rey and joined The Judgment Day.

=== SmackDown ===
On the following episode of SmackDown, Ronda Rousey was suspended for her actions at SummerSlam. Later that night, Shayna Baszler won a gauntlet match to become the number one contender for Liv Morgan's SmackDown Women's Championship at Clash at the Castle, where Morgan retained. After Rousey's suspension was lifted, she won a fatal five-way elimination match on the September 9 episode to earn a rematch against Morgan for the SmackDown Women's Championship at Extreme Rules. The following week, Morgan decided that she wanted to defend the title against Rousey in an Extreme Rules match, and Rousey accepted.

Also, Drew McIntyre and Roman Reigns had their match for the Undisputed WWE Universal Championship at Clash at the Castle, where Reigns retained after interference from Solo Sikoa, who joined The Bloodline shortly afterwards.

== Results ==
No.	Results	Stipulations	Times
1	Bianca Belair (c) defeated Becky Lynch by pinfall	Singles match for the WWE Raw Women's Championship	15:10
2	Logan Paul defeated The Miz (with Maryse and Ciampa) by pinfall	Singles match	14:15
3	Bobby Lashley (c) defeated Theory by submission	Singles match for the WWE United States Championship	4:45
4	The Mysterios (Rey Mysterio and Dominik Mysterio) defeated The Judgment Day (Finn Bálor and Damian Priest) (with Rhea Ripley) by pinfall	No Disqualification tag team match	11:05
5	Pat McAfee defeated Happy Corbin by pinfall	Singles match	10:40
6	The Usos (Jey Uso and Jimmy Uso) (c) defeated The Street Profits (Angelo Dawkins and Montez Ford) by pinfall	Tag team match for the Undisputed WWE Tag Team Championship (Note: The name "Undisputed WWE Tag Team Championship" referred to both the Raw Tag Team Championship and SmackDown Tag Team Championship being held and defended together, although both titles remained independently active.) with Jeff Jarrett as the special guest referee.	13:25
7	Liv Morgan (c) defeated Ronda Rousey by pinfall	Singles match for the WWE SmackDown Women's Championship	4:35
8	Roman Reigns (c) (with Paul Heyman) defeated Brock Lesnar	Last Man Standing match for the Undisputed WWE Universal Championship (Note: The name "Undisputed WWE Universal Championship" referred to both the WWE Championship and Universal Championship being held and defended together, although both titles remained independently active.)	23:00
(c) / – the champion(s) heading into the match
