= SummerSlam (2023) =

WWE premium live event

- Promotional poster featuring Roman Reigns, Jey Uso, and various WWE wrestlers
- Promotion: WWE
- Brand(s): Raw; SmackDown
- Date: August 5, 2023
- City: Detroit, Michigan
- Venue: Ford Field
- Attendance: 51,477

WWE event chronology
← Previous; NXT The Great American Bash	Next → Payback

SummerSlam chronology
← Previous; 2022	Next → 2024

The 2023 SummerSlam, also promoted as SummerSlam: Detroit, was a professional wrestling premium live event (PLE) produced by WWE, held for wrestlers from the promotion's main roster brands, Raw and SmackDown. It was the 36th annual SummerSlam and took place on Saturday, August 5, 2023, at Ford Field in Detroit, Michigan. This was WWE's second event held at Ford Field, after WrestleMania 23 in April 2007, which subsequently made it the second SummerSlam to be held in the U.S. state of Michigan, after the 1993 event in Auburn Hills. This also returned SummerSlam to its traditional August slot after the previous year's event was held in July.

Nine matches were contested at the event, with four promoted as main event matches. In the final match of the night, which was one of SmackDown's two main matches, Roman Reigns defeated Jey Uso in Tribal Combat to retain the Undisputed WWE Universal Championship and recognition of Tribal Chief of the Anoaʻi family. For SmackDown's other main match, Bianca Belair defeated defending champion Asuka and Charlotte Flair in a triple threat match to win the WWE Women's Championship, after which, Iyo Sky cashed in her Money in the Bank contract and defeated Belair to win the title. For Raw's two main matches, Seth "Freakin" Rollins defeated Finn Bálor to retain the World Heavyweight Championship and Cody Rhodes defeated Brock Lesnar, in what was Lesnar's last WWE appearance until the 2025 SummerSlam, as he was later named in the Vince McMahon sex trafficking scandal. The event also featured Ronda Rousey's final WWE appearance; she lost to Shayna Baszler in an MMA Rules match at the event and then left WWE in October.

This was the final SummerSlam held in which WWE was majority owned and controlled by the McMahon family before the company's deal with Endeavor was finalized on September 12, 2023, which saw WWE and Endeavor-owned Ultimate Fighting Championship merging to become divisions of a new jointly formed corporate entity called TKO Group Holdings. This was also the first SummerSlam to livestream on Disney+ in the Philippines and Binge in Australia. This would also be the final WWE event to officially be distributed on Blu-ray in Europe, as WWE opted not to renew Fremantle's contract for home video releases after 2023, and shut down its home video division three months later at the end of the year. SummerSlam had a one-disc Blu-ray and two-disc DVD release on September 25 in the United Kingdom.

According to WWE, this was the highest-grossing SummerSlam of all time, as well as the company's highest-grossing event outside of WrestleMania. WWE claimed an attendance of 59,194; however, this number was disputed, with an actual paid attendance of 51,477. It was also the second-largest crowd in SummerSlam history, after the 1992 event.

== Production ==
=== Background ===
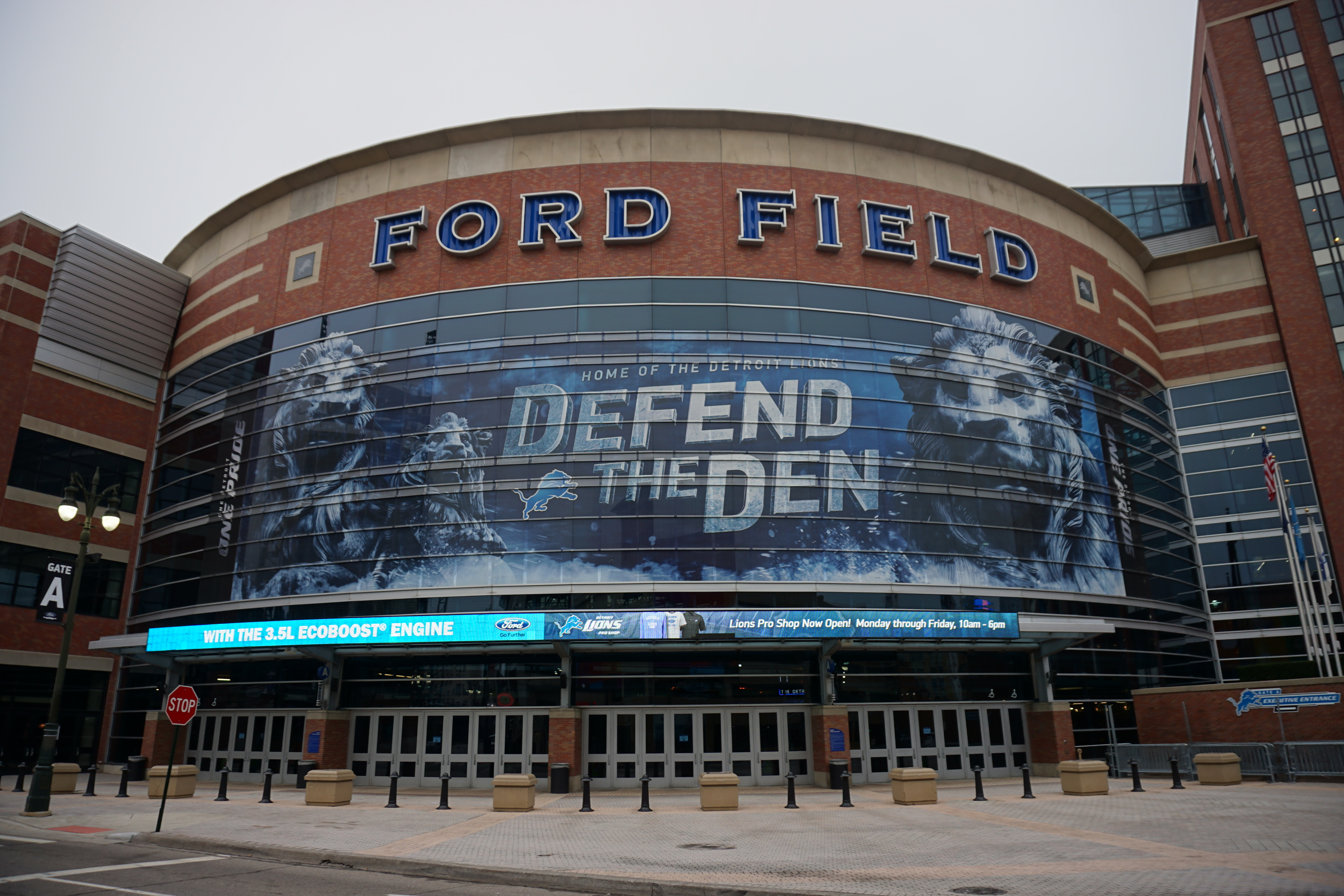
The 36th annual SummerSlam was held at Ford Field in Detroit, Michigan.

SummerSlam is an annual professional wrestling premium live event (PLE) traditionally held in August by WWE since 1988. It was originally broadcast exclusively via pay-per-view (PPV) before it began simulcasting on WWE's livestreaming platforms in 2014. Dubbed "The Biggest Party of the Summer", it is one of the promotion's original four PPVs, along with WrestleMania, Royal Rumble, and Survivor Series, referred to as the "Big Four", and as of August 2021, it is considered one of the "Big Five", along with Money in the Bank. Out of the five, it is considered WWE's second biggest event of the year behind WrestleMania.

Announced on February 7, 2023, the 36th SummerSlam was scheduled to be held on Saturday, August 5, 2023, at Ford Field in Detroit, Michigan, and featured wrestlers from the Raw and SmackDown brand divisions. This returned SummerSlam to its traditional August slot after the previous year was held in July. This also marked WWE's second event to be held at Ford Field, after WrestleMania 23 in April 2007, subsequently being the second SummerSlam to be held in the U.S. state of Michigan, after the 1993 event, which was in Auburn Hills. Tickets went on sale on April 14. Pre-sale opened the previous day, with a reported 25,000–30,000 tickets sold. By July 28, a reported 45,971 tickets had been sold. Detroit area native, musician, and WWE Hall of Famer Kid Rock did the cold open for the event.

From January 2023, there had been speculation that WWE had been placed up for sale. Hours before WrestleMania 39 Night 2 began, CNBC reported via multiple sources that a deal between WWE and Endeavor, the parent company of Ultimate Fighting Championship (UFC) via Zuffa, was imminent. The deal involved a merger of WWE with the UFC into a new publicly traded company, with Endeavor holding a 51% stake. The sale was confirmed the next day on April 3 and was finalized on September 12, with WWE merging with the UFC to become divisions of TKO Group Holdings. The 2023 SummerSlam was in turn the final SummerSlam held in which WWE was still owned and controlled by the McMahon family.

SummerSlam took place on the same night as the boxing match between Jake Paul and Nate Diaz in Dallas, Texas. To support his brother, Logan Paul requested and was granted the opening spot on SummerSlam's card so that he could make the two-hour flight in order to accompany his brother for his boxing match.

=== Broadcast outlets ===
SummerSlam was available through traditional PPV outlets worldwide. It was also available to livestream on Peacock in the United States, SonyLIV in India, Disney+ Hotstar in Indonesia, Disney+ in the Philippines, Binge in Australia, and the WWE Network everywhere else. It was the first SummerSlam to livestream on Disney+ in the Philippines, following the shutdown of its version of the WWE Network in November 2022, and it was also the first SummerSlam to livestream on Binge in Australia after the Australian version of the WWE Network merged under Foxtel's channel Binge in January.

=== Storylines ===
The event included matches that resulted from scripted storylines. Results were predetermined by WWE's writers on the Raw and SmackDown brands, while storylines were produced on WWE's weekly television shows, Monday Night Raw and Friday Night SmackDown.

On the Raw after WrestleMania 39, for unknown reasons, Brock Lesnar viciously attacked Cody Rhodes before both were set to participate in a tag team match. This resulted in a match at Backlash that Rhodes won. A rematch occurred at Night of Champions, which Lesnar won via technical submission due to Rhodes passing out to the Kimura Lock submission. Due to Rhodes and Lesnar having one win each, and the fact that Rhodes passed out and did not give up, Rhodes issued an open challenge to Lesnar for anytime, anywhere on the following episode of Raw. Lesnar returned on the July 3 episode, where he brawled with Rhodes. The following week, Rhodes challenged Lesnar to a third match at SummerSlam. After viciously attacking Rhodes on the next episode, Lesnar accepted the challenge.

At Money in the Bank, Seth "Freakin" Rollins successfully defended the World Heavyweight Championship against Finn Bálor after Bálor's Judgment Day stablemate, Damian Priest, who had won the men's Money in the Bank ladder match earlier that night, accidentally distracted Bálor. On the following episode of Raw in a match between Rollins and Judgment Day's "Dirty" Dominik Mysterio, Priest attacked Rollins, thus Rollins won by disqualification. As Priest attempted to cash in his Money in the Bank contract, Bálor appeared and attacked Rollins, costing Priest his opportunity, which caused some disagreement between Bálor and Priest. The following week, arguments between Bálor and Priest intensified, however, both Bálor and Priest agreed that Bálor should receive a title match first. Later, The Judgment Day defeated Rollins's team in a six-man tag team match. On the July 17 episode, Bálor challenged Rollins to a rematch for the title, however, Rollins declined and stated that they could settle their differences that night without the title as both had issues with each other. As Bálor seemingly left, he viciously attacked Rollins. A match between the two for the World Heavyweight Championship was then scheduled for SummerSlam.

At Night of Champions, Asuka defeated Bianca Belair to win the Raw Women's Championship. As a result of the 2023 WWE Draft, the title moved to the SmackDown brand and on the June 9 episode of SmackDown, Asuka was presented with a new championship belt and the title reverted to its original name of WWE Women's Championship to resolve the issue of the "Raw" women's championship being on SmackDown (the SmackDown Women's Championship had also moved to Raw in the draft and it was subsequently renamed as Women's World Championship with a new belt design). Prior to the presentation, WWE official Adam Pearce requested Belair not to interrupt, who stated that she wanted a rematch for the title. However, Charlotte Flair, in her first appearance since Night 1 of WrestleMania 39, interrupted and challenged Asuka for the title. Asuka accepted, much to the dismay of Belair. The title match was scheduled for the June 30 episode. Belair watched as a fan from ringside where Flair accidentally struck Belair. This infuriated Belair, who attacked Asuka, ending the match in a disqualification win for Asuka. Following the match, Belair attacked Asuka and Flair. On the next episode, a brawl between the three occurred, which also involved Damage CTRL (Bayley and women's Money in the Bank winner Iyo Sky), with an unsuccessful cash-in attempt from Sky. A title match between Asuka and Belair was scheduled for the July 14 episode. Before the match, Belair and Flair agreed that if Belair won, she would defend the title against Flair at SummerSlam. During the match, however, Flair accidentally struck Belair once again after Damage CTRL once again tried to interfere. As a result of Flair's actions, Belair won the match by disqualification but not the title. On July 21, a triple threat match between Asuka, Belair, and Flair for the WWE Women's Championship was scheduled for SummerSlam.

At Night of Champions during The Bloodline's (Roman Reigns and Solo Sikoa) match for the Undisputed WWE Tag Team Championship, The Usos (Jey Uso and Jimmy Uso) interfered and unintentionally struck Sikoa. After an irate Reigns shoved both Usos around, Jimmy attacked Reigns out of pent up anger after weeks of disrespect from Reigns, thus leaving The Bloodline, and Reigns and Sikoa would ultimately lose the match. Jey would also leave The Bloodline on the June 16 episode of SmackDown, where he attacked Reigns and Sikoa, choosing to stand by his brother Jimmy's side. This led to a "Bloodline Civil War" tag team match at Money in the Bank, where The Usos defeated Reigns and Sikoa with Jey pinning Reigns, which was the first time Reigns was pinned since TLC: Tables, Ladders & Chairs in December 2019. On the following SmackDown, a trial for Reigns was held where Reigns feigned that he did not want to be the Tribal Chief any longer and attacked Jey with a low blow. Sikoa and Reigns brutally attacked Jimmy, who was taken to a hospital. Later that night, Jey viciously attacked Reigns and Sikoa with a steel chair before challenging Reigns for the Undisputed WWE Universal Championship. The following week, Jey spoke about his family's relationship with one another before he was interrupted by Sikoa and Reigns's special counsel Paul Heyman, who stated that Reigns would meet Jey the following week to discuss the "rules of engagement". The following week, during the "rules of engagement", it was agreed that Reigns would defend the Undisputed WWE Universal Championship against Jey in an anything goes match called Tribal Combat, where in addition to the title, the winner would be recognized as the Tribal Chief of the Anoaʻi family. This drew back to the early days of Reigns's Universal Championship reign, where he defeated Jey in a Hell in a Cell "I Quit" match at Hell in a Cell in October 2020, and forced Jey to acknowledge him as the "Head of the Table".

At the Royal Rumble in January, Logan Paul and Ricochet were participants in the men's Royal Rumble match. During the match, both were involved in a high spot in which they performed simultaneous springboard clotheslines at each other from opposite sides of the ring and collided in midair, which went viral across social media. In June 2023, issues resurfaced between Ricochet and Paul and resumed after Paul was added to the men's Money in the Bank ladder match without qualifying like the other participants, including Ricochet. During the match, the two brawled with each other, where Ricochet performed a springboard Spanish fly on Paul through two tables outside the ring, taking both out for the remainder of the match. Later in a backstage segment, Paul attacked Ricochet for costing him a title opportunity. Ricochet then invited Paul to meet him face-to-face on the July 10 episode of Raw where he challenged Paul to a match only for Paul to decline. Paul once again accepted Ricochet's invitation to meet him on the July 24 episode where Paul attacked Ricochet from behind and then accepted his challenge to a match at SummerSlam.

On Night 2 of WrestleMania 39, Gunther successfully defended the Intercontinental Championship in a triple threat match, which also involved Drew McIntyre, who Gunther pinned to retain the title. Following this, McIntyre went on hiatus for the next three months. After Gunther successfully defended his championship at Money in the Bank, McIntyre made a surprise return and brawled with Gunther. McIntyre then taunted Gunther with the title. McIntyre then started a rivalry with Imperium (Gunther, Ludwig Kaiser, and Giovanni Vinci) over the next few weeks, including defeating Kaiser and Vinci in a tag team match on the July 10 episode of Raw. The following week, after Gunther's match, Gunther called out McIntyre and challenged him with a face-to-face segment scheduled for the next episode. On the next episode, McIntyre challenged Gunther to a match for his championship that night, however, Gunther declined, stating that he would defend it against McIntyre at SummerSlam, which was made official.

At Money in the Bank, Ronda Rousey and Shayna Baszler lost the WWE Women's Tag Team Championship after Baszler turned on Rousey. On the following episode of Raw, Rousey called out Baszler, who claimed that she was responsible for bringing Rousey into WWE, and while she had to work her way through the WWE system, beginning in NXT, Rousey skipped the process and competed in her debut match at WrestleMania 34. Baszler then claimed that she was the one who could finally shut Rousey up, after which, Rousey and Baszler brawled with each other. and once again brawled the following week. On the July 17 episode, Baszler challenged Rousey to come to the ring, however, Rousey declined, and stated that she would fight Baszler at SummerSlam. The following week, both agreed to a match at SummerSlam, which was later confirmed. On the final Raw before SummerSlam, it was announced that the match would be a Mixed Martial Arts (MMA) Rules match.

On the July 28 episode of SmackDown, it was announced that in a cross-promotion with Slim Jim, a SummerSlam Battle Royal would take place at the event and would feature male wrestlers from both Raw and SmackDown. After an argument between Sheamus and LA Knight, WWE official Adam Pearce named the two as the first entrants.

== Event ==
Other on-screen personnel
Role:	Name:
English commentators	Michael Cole
English commentators	Corey Graves
Spanish commentators	Marcelo Rodriguez
Spanish commentators	Jerry Soto
Ring announcers	Mike Rome (SmackDown)
Ring announcers	Samantha Irvin (Raw)
Referees	Danilo Anfibio
Referees	Jason Ayers
Referees	Shawn Bennett
Referees	Jessika Carr
Referees	Ryan Tran
Referees	Daphanie LaShaunn
Referees	Eddie Orengo
Referees	Chad Patton
Referees	Rod Zapata
Interviewer	Cathy Kelley
Pre-show panel	Kayla Braxton
Pre-show panel	Jackie Redmond
Pre-show panel	Peter Rosenberg
Pre-show panel	Booker T
Pre-show panel	Wade Barrett

=== Preliminary matches ===
The PLE opened with Logan Paul facing Ricochet. During the match, Paul and Ricochet performed a Spanish Fly at ringside. Back in the ring, Paul performed a standing moonsault on Ricochet for a nearfall. Ricochet performed a swinging neckbreaker on Paul off the top rope. Ricochet attempted a shooting star press on Paul off the top rope, however, Paul raised his knees to circumvent the maneuver. Paul performed a springboard frog spalsh on Ricochet for a nearfall. In the climax, Paul's manager Jeff Levin gave Paul brass knuckles and Paul punched Ricochet with the brass knuckles, unbeknownst to the referee, to win the match.

Next, Cody Rhodes faced Brock Lesnar. Rhodes attacked Lesnar at the start of the match, however, Lesnar responded with a Suplex. Although Rhodes mounted an offensive comeback, Lesnar countered and dominated Rhodes. Lesnar then threw Rhodes out of the ring for a countout victory, however, Rhodes broke the count twice, which enraged Lesnar. Lesnar then taunted Rhodes and repeatedly threw Rhodes out of the ring only for Rhodes to break the count. Lesnar then performed an F-5 on Rhodes at ringside, who broke the count at nine. Lesnar then performed an F-5 through the announce table, but Rhodes still managed to break the count at nine. Lesnar then performed a German Suplex on Rhodes. As Rhodes tried to attack Lesnar with the steel steps, Lesnar knocked the steel steps off Rhodes and attacked him, however, Rhodes eventually attacked Lesnar with the steps and performed 2 Cody Cutters on Lesnar for a nearfall. Lesnar applied the Kimura Lock on Rhodes, who managed to reach the ring ropes. As Lesnar attempted another F-5, Rhodes countered and sent Lesnar into an exposed turnbuckle and applied Lesnar's own Kimura Lock on him, who managed to counter. In the end, Lesnar attempted an F-5, however, Rhodes countered into three Cross Rhodes to win the match. Following the match, Lesnar uncharacteristically endorsed Rhodes.

After that was the Slim Jim SummerSlam Battle Royal. In the closing moments, LA Knight eliminated Sheamus to win the match.

In the fourth match, Shayna Baszler faced Ronda Rousey in an MMA Rules match. In the closing moments, Baszler applied the Kirifuda Clutch on Rousey, who passed out, thus Baszler won by technical submission.

Next, Gunther defended Raw's Intercontinental Championship against Drew McIntyre. Both wrestlers ended up at ringside early on. Gunther picked up McIntyre and dropped him back first on the ring steps, and started to chop him. McIntyre went for a Claymore, but Gunther ducked it. In the closing moments, Gunther performed a top rope splash and then followed up with a lariat and a powerbomb on McIntyre to retain the title.

After that, Seth "Freakin" Rollins defended Raw's World Heavyweight Championship against Finn Bálor. Bálor took a cheap shot at Rollins before the bell. The referee separated them and then called for the bell to start the match. Bálor targeted the left arm of Rollins early on. Rollins put Bálor down with a falcon arrow for a nearfall. Bálor bounced back and ran Rollins' bad shoulder into the ring post. Bálor performed a Barricade Bomb, but Rollins. In the ring, Bálor performed a sling blade clothesline and an inverted DDT for a nearfall. Bálor put Rollins in an armbar, but Rollins powered up and performed a two buckle bombs, followed by top rope splash for a nearfall. Rollins set up for a Stomp, but Bálor avoided it and performed a standing double stomp. Rollins performed the Pedigree for a near fall. Bálor's Judgment Day stablemates "Dirty" Dominik Mysterio and Rhea Ripley hopped the barricade and distracted the referee, followed by Damian Priest, who offered Bálor the Money in the Bank briefcase to use as a weapon, but Bálor declined. Rollins knocked Priest off the apron. Bálor tried to roll up Rollins, who slipped away and Stomped him, which led to a nearfall. Rollins took out Priest with a top rope dive and then superkicked Mysterio at ringside. Back in the ring, Bálor hit a sling blade clothesline and then hit the Coup De Grâce for a nearfall. Moments later, Priest put the briefcase in the ring. Priest went to the apron and distracted the referee. Bálor reached for the briefcase, but Rollins performed the Stomp on Bálor to retain the title.

In the penultimate match, Asuka defended SmackDown's WWE Women's Championship against Bianca Belair and Charlotte Flair. Flair sent Asuka and Belair to the floor and then performed a moonsault. When Flair stood up, Asuka caught her with a kick. Asuka got Flair back inside the ring and leapt from the ropes and spiked Flair's head on the mat. Asuka went for the pin, but Belair returned to break it up. Belair hoisted up Asuka for the Kiss of Death, but Asuka escaped. Flair booted Asuka off the apron. Belair went for the Kiss of Death on Flair, who slipped out. Asuka tossed Belair to the floor and then covered Flair for a nearfall. Asuka applied an armbar on Flair, who tried and failed to power her up. Belair returned and put Flair down with a sit-out powerbomb. Asuka caught Belair in the Asuka Lock. Flair drove Belair's face into the middle turnbuckle and performed a top rope moonsault onto both opponents for a nearfall. In the closing moments, Flair tossed Belair over the top rope and Belair landed on the steel stairs, hurting her knee. Asuka put Flair down with a backslide for a nearfall. At the same time, trainers and referees helped Belair leave the ringside area. In the ring, Flair speared Asuka for a nearfall. Flair put Asuka in the Figure Eight Leg Lock, but Belair returned to the ring and performed a 450° splash onto Flair for a nearfall. Belair avoided chops and then went for the Kiss of Death, but Flair rolled out of it. While Flair had the Figure Eight Leg Lock applied on Belair, Asuka returned to the ring and blew mist into Flair's face. Asuka threw a kick at Belair, who ducked it, and then hooked Asuka into an inside cradle to win the title for the second time.

After the match, Iyo Sky ran in with the Money in the Bank contract. Bayley followed and took the briefcase from her and then hit Asuka and Flair with it. Bayley tried to hit Belair with it, but she avoided it. Sky picked up the briefcase and hit Belair with it and then she cashed in her contract. Sky then performed an Over the Moonsault to win her first WWE Women's Championship. After the match, Dakota Kai joined Bayley in celebrating with Sky in the ring in her first appearance in WWE since she tore her ACL.

=== Main event ===
In the main event, Roman Reigns (with Paul Heyman) defended SmackDown's Undisputed WWE Universal Championship and recognition of Tribal Chief of the Anoaʻi family against Jey Uso in Tribal Combat. Reigns dominated Jey, who battled back and clotheslined Reigns over the top rope and performed a suicide dive onto Reigns. Reigns recovered and attacked Jey. Back in the ring, Reigns whipped the back of Jey’s head into the middle turnbuckle. Jey blasted Reigns with repeated kendo stick shots until the stick broke. Jey went up top and dove at Reigns, who caught him with a Superman Punch for a nearfall. Jey rallied and hit Reigns with a top rope splash for a nearfall. Jey dominated Reigns and hit him with multiple chair shots. Jey then set up for a superplex onto a bunch of chairs, but Reigns blocked it and knocked Jey off the ropes with a headbutt. Jey got up and hit Reigns with an enzuigiri, then went right back to the ropes. Reigns slipped under Jey and then powerbombed him onto a couple of chairs for a nearfall. Reigns went to the floor and pulled out another table and slid it inside the ring and hoisted up Jey with the intention of tossing him through another table that was set up at ringside, but Jey slipped away to the apron. On the apron, both men were knocked off and crashed through the table on the floor. Jey pulled a leather strap out from underneath the ring and whipped Reigns with it. Solo Sikoa showed up and hit Jey. Sikoa cleared the table off and then used a uranage slam to put Jey through the table, and then brought him back to the ring and performed another uranage slam. Reigns went for the spear, but Jey avoided it and pulled Sikoa into the spear. Jey followed up with his own spear on Reigns for a nearfall. In the closing moments, after Reigns went to the floor, Jey attempted to attack Reigns with a chair, but Sikoa caught Jey with a superkick. After Reigns motioned for Sikoa to help him up, Jey speared Reigns through the barricade. Sikoa attempted to slam Jey through the broadcast table, but Jey escaped. Jey superkicked Sikoa, who ended up on the table. Jey went to the barricade and performed a splash on Sikoa through the table. Jey brought Reigns back to the ring and speared him, and then he went up top rope and performed a splash on Reigns. Jey covered Reigns, but he was pulled from the ring by a hooded man. The hooded man revealed himself to be Jimmy Uso, who superkicked Jey and then rolled him back inside the ring. Reigns then speared Jey through a table that was set up in a corner of the ring to retain the title and recognition of Tribal Chief.

== Reception ==
The event received generally positive reviews from critics, who along with fans, lauded the Cody-Brock match, the Logan-Ricochet match, and the World Heavyweight Championship bout, but criticized the MMA Rules match (with many calling it "boring"), and the main event. During the SummerSlam post-event press conference, WWE executive Triple H revealed that the 2023 event was the highest-grossing SummerSlam event of all time, as well as the highest-grossing event outside of WrestleMania. WWE also reported an attendance of 59,194. This number has been disputed, with a reported actual attendance of 51,477. Despite the dispute, this gives it the second-largest crowd in SummerSlam history, after the 1992 event, which had a reported attendance of 80,355 (although its actual attendance was 78,927, but still the largest).

Wrestling journalist Dave Meltzer of the Wrestling Observer Newsletter rated the Logan-Ricochet match 4.25 stars, the Cody-Brock match and the World Heavyweight Championship match 4.5 stars (the highest rated matches on the card), the MMA Rules bout 1.5 stars (the lowest rated match on the card), the Intercontinental Championship match 4 stars, the Women's Championship match 3.5 stars, the Slim Jim Battle Royal and the Undisputed WWE Universal Championship match 2.75 stars.

== Aftermath ==
Following his loss at SummerSlam, Brock Lesnar would go on a hiatus for two years. According to several reports, Lesnar was scheduled to make his return to WWE at the 2024 Royal Rumble as a participant in the Royal Rumble match, however, he was pulled from the event due to being named in the Vince McMahon sex trafficking scandal, and all planned storylines for him leading up to WrestleMania XL that year were scrapped. He eventually returned to WWE at the 2025 SummerSlam, which drew controversy.

=== Raw ===
Cody Rhodes opened the following episode of Raw and stated that he respected Lesnar after his gesture following their match at SummerSlam. Rhodes spoke about finishing his story and that he could beat anyone. This prompted World Heavyweight Champion Seth "Freakin" Rollins to come out and challenge Rhodes. The Judgment Day then came out and confronted the two. Bálor attacked Rollins, which led to one-half of the Undisputed WWE Tag Team Champions, Sami Zayn, coming out for the save. Rhodes, Rollins, and Zayn then challenged Judgment Day to a six-man tag team match. Later on, however, Zayn was attacked by JD McDonagh and was deemed unable to compete. Shinsuke Nakamura then offered to join Rhodes and Rollins in their match and he, Rollins, and Rhodes defeated Judgment Day. Following the match, Nakamura attacked Rollins, turning heel for the first time since 2021. This eventually led to a title match between Nakamura and Rollins for Payback.

The Miz, one of the wrestlers LA Knight eliminated from the Slim Jim Battle Royal, and Knight would continue their feud, including Miz costing Knight a shot at the United States Championship, eventually leading to a match at Payback.

=== SmackDown ===
SmackDown opened with a one-on-one match between Charlotte Flair and former WWE Women's Champion Asuka, following their loss against Bianca Belair in the Triple Threat match for the title at SummerSlam. During the match, Damage CTRL appeared and the new WWE Women's Champion, Iyo Sky (who had cashed in her Money in the Bank contract on Belair), proceeded to attack Flair and Asuka, thus ending the match in a disqualification. Sky and Bayley continued to attack Flair and Asuka while Dakota Kai reminded the crowd who their new WWE Women's Champion was. The following week, Damage CTRL sidelined Belair with a knee injury.

As SmackDown was reaching its conclusion, Roman Reigns wanted to thank Jimmy Uso for helping him retain the Undisputed WWE Universal Championship and his Tribal Chief status against Jey Uso by betraying his twin brother. To show appreciation to Jimmy, he offered him anything he would want. However, Jimmy rejected the offer and explained that his actions at SummerSlam had nothing to do with Reigns. Jey Uso came out and demanded an explanation on why Jimmy betrayed him. Jimmy explained that he was afraid that he would lose Jey if he won the title, highlighting how the title would corrupt him just as it had corrupted Reigns. Jey turned his back on Jimmy, prompting the latter to leave the ring. Reigns proceeded to mock Jey for being emotional, which led to him attacking Reigns and Solo Sikoa in retaliation. Just as it seemed he was about to forgive Jimmy, Jey also attacked him with a Superkick for his betrayal. He then declared that he was quitting WWE following the mess within the Bloodline. However, Jimmy would rejoin The Bloodline, while Jey would move to Raw at Payback a few weeks later. This long rivalry would culminate at Night 1 of WrestleMania XL, which saw Jey defeat Jimmy. Later that year, The Usos reunited with Reigns as well as Sami Zayn and began to feud with Sikoa's iteration of The Bloodline, which since added Tama Tonga, Tonga Loa (formerly known as Camacho), and Jacob Fatu, whom the trio had emerged victorious at Survivor Series: WarGames in a 4-on-4 WarGames match.

== Results ==
No.	Results	Stipulations	Times
1	Logan Paul defeated Ricochet by pinfall	Singles match	18:00
2	Cody Rhodes defeated Brock Lesnar by pinfall	Singles match	17:35
3	LA Knight won by last eliminating Sheamus (Note: Order of elimination: Apollo Crews, JD McDonagh, Rick Boogs, Otis, Giovanni Vinci, Ivar, Erik, Shinsuke Nakamura, Tommaso Ciampa, Ridge Holland, Cameron Grimes, Austin Theory, Santos Escobar, Ludwig Kaiser, Butch, Matt Riddle, Omos, The Miz, Grayson Waller, Karrion Kross, Chad Gable, Bronson Reed, AJ Styles, and Sheamus.)	25-man Slim Jim SummerSlam Battle Royal	11:55
4	Shayna Baszler defeated Ronda Rousey by technical submission	MMA Rules match	7:30
5	Gunther (c) defeated Drew McIntyre by pinfall	Singles match for the WWE Intercontinental Championship	13:40
6	Seth "Freakin" Rollins (c) defeated Finn Bálor by pinfall	Singles match for the World Heavyweight Championship	18:30
7	Bianca Belair defeated Asuka (c) and Charlotte Flair by pinfall	Triple threat match for the WWE Women's Championship	20:45
8	Iyo Sky (with Bayley) defeated Bianca Belair (c) by pinfall	Singles match for the WWE Women's Championship; This was Sky's Money in the Bank cash-in match.	0:08
9	Roman Reigns (c) (with Paul Heyman) defeated Jey Uso by pinfall	Tribal Combat for the Undisputed WWE Universal Championship (Note: The name "Undisputed WWE Universal Championship" referred to both the WWE Championship and Universal Championship being held and defended together, although both titles remained independently active despite the undisputed championship being represented by one title belt.) and recognition of "Tribal Chief" of the Anoaʻi family	36:05
(c) / – the champion(s) heading into the match
