= Money in the Bank (2018) =

WWE pay-per-view and livestreaming event

- Promotional poster featuring Nia Jax and Ronda Rousey
- Promotion: WWE
- Brand(s): Raw; SmackDown
- Date: June 17, 2018
- City: Rosemont, Illinois
- Venue: Allstate Arena
- Attendance: 15,214
- Tagline: The Irresistible Force Meets the Baddest Woman on the Planet

WWE event chronology
← Previous; NXT TakeOver: Chicago II	Next → United Kingdom Championship Tournament

Money in the Bank chronology
← Previous; 2017	Next → 2019

The 2018 Money in the Bank was a professional wrestling pay-per-view (PPV) and livestreaming event produced by WWE, held for wrestlers from the promotion's main roster brands, Raw and SmackDown. It was the ninth annual Money in the Bank event and took place on June 17, 2018, at the Allstate Arena in the Chicago suburb of Rosemont, Illinois. The event centered on the Money in the Bank ladder match, a multi-person ladder match where the wrestlers compete to retrieve a briefcase hanging above the ring which contains a contract for a guaranteed world championship match at any time within the next year.

Eleven matches were contested at the event, including one on the Kickoff pre-show. This year's respective men's and women's Money in the Bank ladder matches were evenly divided between participants from both brands with the respective winners earning a contract for a world championship match of their respective brand. The main event was the men's ladder match, which was won by Raw's Braun Strowman to earn a Universal Championship match contract. On the undercard, the women's version was won by Raw's Alexa Bliss to earn a Raw Women's Championship match contract; later that night, Bliss cashed in her contact and won the title from Nia Jax after causing a disqualification in Jax's defense against Ronda Rousey. In other prominent matches, AJ Styles retained SmackDown's WWE Championship against Shinsuke Nakamura in a Last Man Standing match, and Carmella defeated Asuka to retain the SmackDown Women's Championship.

This was the second Money in the Bank event held at the Allstate Arena, after the 2011 event, which was also the last time the event featured both brands during a brand split, after the 2017 event was held exclusively for SmackDown. While WWE's other monthly PPV and livestreaming events were originally planned to continue being brand-exclusive throughout 2018, the 2018 Money in the Bank was originally scheduled to have been the only monthly event for the main roster outside of the "Big Four" (WrestleMania, SummerSlam, Survivor Series, and Royal Rumble) to feature both brands, but after WrestleMania 34 in April, WWE discontinued all brand-exclusive PPV and livestreaming events for the main roster.

Critics gave the event a mixed-to-positive reception; the ladder matches, WWE Championship, Raw Women's Championship, and Raw's Intercontinental Championship matches garnered the most praise. The remaining matches from the card, however—including Bobby Lashley vs. Sami Zayn and Roman Reigns vs. Jinder Mahal—were negatively received.

== Production ==
=== Background ===
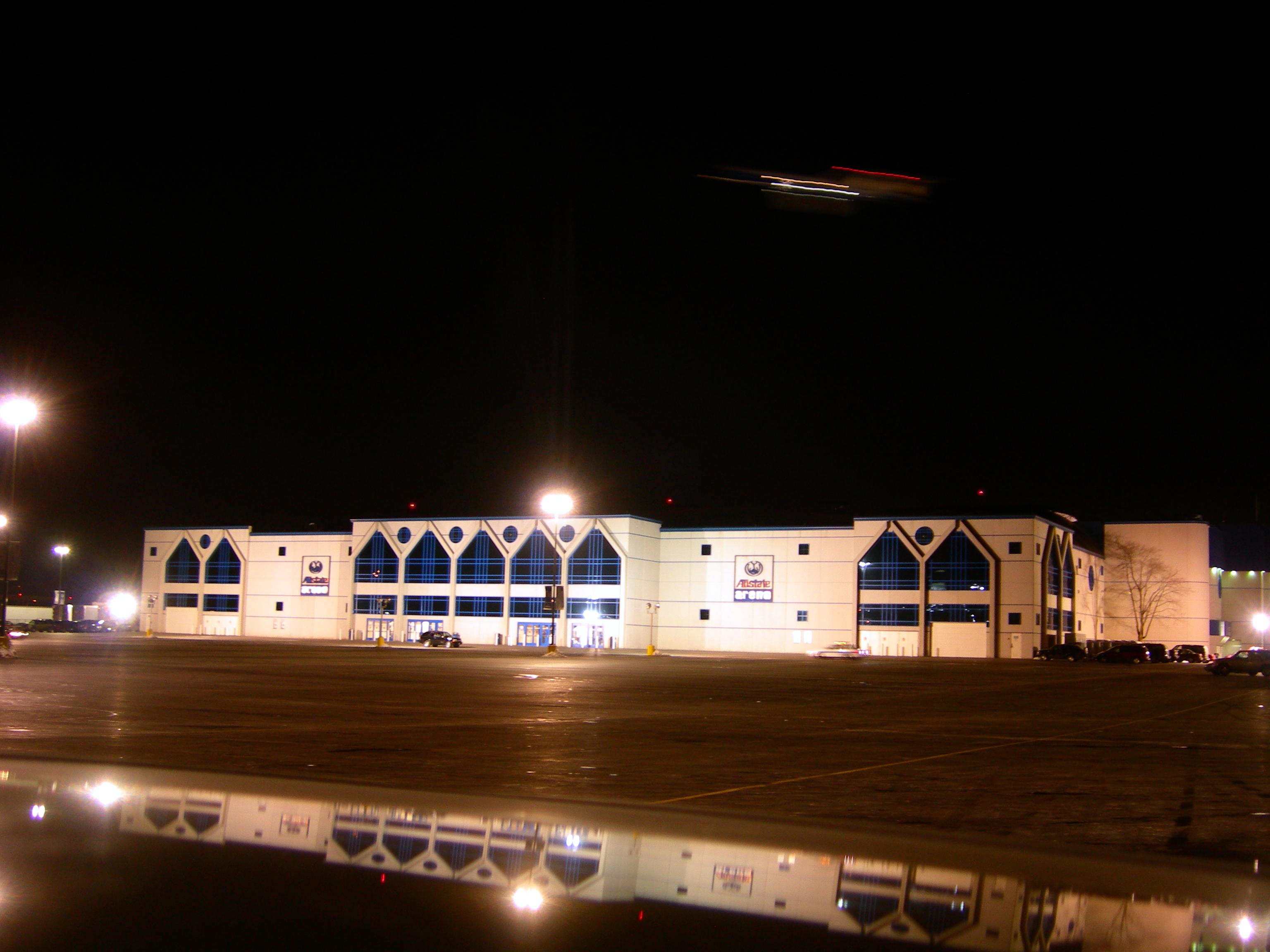
The ninth annual Money in the Bank event was the second time for the event to be held at the Allstate Arena in the Chicago suburb of Rosemont, Illinois, after 2011.

Money in the Bank is an annual professional wrestling event produced by WWE since 2010, which at the time was generally held between June and July. It was originally broadcast exclusively via pay-per-view (PPV) before it began simultaneously livestreaming on the WWE Network in 2014. The concept of the event comes from WWE's established Money in the Bank ladder match. Announced on November 22, 2017, the ninth Money in the Bank event was scheduled to be held on June 17, 2018, at the Allstate Arena in the Chicago suburb Rosemont, Illinois, marking the second Money in the Bank held at this venue after the 2011 event. Tickets went on sale on March 9 through Ticketmaster.

While the 2017 event was held exclusively for the SmackDown brand, the 2018 event was scheduled to feature wrestlers from both Raw and SmackDown. It was originally planned to be the only main roster monthly event outside of the "Big Four" (Royal Rumble, WrestleMania, SummerSlam, and Survivor Series) to feature both brands in 2018, but following WrestleMania 34 in April that year, WWE discontinued all brand-exclusive PPV and livestreaming events for the main roster. It was the first Money in the Bank event since 2011 to feature both brands during a brand split.

The Money in the Bank ladder match features multiple wrestlers using ladders to retrieve a briefcase hanging above the ring. The briefcase contains a contract that guarantees the winner a match for a world championship at any time within the next year. The 2017 event introduced the first women's Money in the Bank ladder match, with it becoming standard for the event to include both a men's and women's match. For 2018, each match featured eight wrestlers evenly divided between the two brands and the contracts in the briefcases specifically granted the winners a world championship match of their respective brand. Male wrestlers competed for a contract to grant them a match for either Raw's Universal Championship or SmackDown's WWE Championship, while female wrestlers competed for a Raw Women's Championship or SmackDown Women's Championship match contract.

=== Storylines ===
The event comprised 11 matches, including one on the Kickoff pre-show, which resulted from scripted storylines. Results were predetermined by WWE's writers on the Raw and SmackDown brands, while storylines were produced on WWE's weekly television shows, Monday Night Raw and SmackDown Live.

==== Raw ====
Qualifying matches for the men's Money in the Bank ladder match began on the May 7 episode of Raw. In the first match, Braun Strowman qualified by defeating Kevin Owens, while in the second, Finn Bálor defeated Sami Zayn and Roman Reigns in a triple threat match after interference from Jinder Mahal. The following week, two more triple threat matches took place; in the first, Bobby Roode defeated Baron Corbin and No Way Jose to qualify while in the second, Owens, who replaced Mahal after Reigns attacked Mahal backstage, defeated Elias and Bobby Lashley to qualify after interference from Zayn.

Qualifying matches for the women's ladder match also began on the May 7 episode of Raw. Ember Moon defeated Sasha Banks and Ruby Riott in a triple threat match to qualify. The following week, Alexa Bliss qualified by defeating Bayley and Mickie James, also in a triple threat match. On the May 21 episode, Natalya defeated Liv Morgan, Sarah Logan, and Dana Brooke in a fatal four-way match to qualify. The final qualifying match took place on the May 28 episode, in which Banks defeated the other women who lost their respective Money in the Bank qualifying matches in a gauntlet match to earn the final spot.

During the NBCUniversal Upfront event on May 14, television presenter Cathy Kelley interviewed Ronda Rousey. Raw Women's Champion Nia Jax interrupted the interview and challenged Rousey to a match for the title at Money in the Bank, and Rousey accepted. The two signed the contract for their match the following week. The bout would be Rousey's first singles match in WWE.

On the May 28 episode of Raw, Seth Rollins interrupted Elias, who was trying to sing for the crowd as a part of his gimmick, and forced him to leave. After Rollins' successful Intercontinental Championship defense, Elias smashed a guitar on his back. On May 31, a match between the two for the Intercontinental Championship was scheduled for Money in the Bank.

On the May 14 episode of Raw, after Jinder Mahal cost Roman Reigns a chance to qualify for the Money in the Bank ladder match the previous week, Reigns attacked him backstage, resulting in a brawl that ended with Reigns spearing Mahal through a wall backstage, costing him his spot in a Money in the Bank qualifying match. On the May 21 episode, after Reigns and Seth Rollins defeated Mahal and Kevin Owens in a tag team match, Mahal attacked Reigns with a chair. Later that night, a match between the two was scheduled for Money in the Bank.

During a tag team match on the April 23 episode of Raw, Bobby Lashley performed a one-handed suspended vertical suplex on Sami Zayn, which Zayn claimed gave him vertigo and why he missed the Greatest Royal Rumble. At Backlash, Lashley and Braun Strowman defeated Kevin Owens and Sami Zayn in a tag team match. During an interview on the May 7 episode of Raw, Lashley spoke about his family, including his three sisters; in response, Zayn said Lashley was not a nice guy and promised to bring out Lashley's sisters to tell the truth. On the May 21 episode, three men dressed as Lashley's sisters accused Lashley of violence. Lashley interrupted the segment and attacked Zayn and the imposters. The following week, a match between the two was scheduled for Money in the Bank.

==== SmackDown ====
Qualifying matches for the men's ladder match continued on the May 8 episode of SmackDown. The Miz and Rusev defeated Jeff Hardy and Daniel Bryan, respectively, to qualify. The following week, Big E and Xavier Woods of The New Day defeated Cesaro and Sheamus in a tag team match, allowing one member of The New Day to qualify. Samoa Joe secured the final spot by defeating Bryan and Big Cass in a triple threat match on the May 29 episode.

Qualifying matches for the women's ladder match also continued on the May 8 episode of SmackDown, in which Charlotte Flair defeated Peyton Royce to qualify. The following week, Becky Lynch defeated Mandy Rose and Sonya Deville in a triple threat match to qualify. On the May 22 episode, Lana and Naomi qualified by defeating Billie Kay and Deville, respectively, in singles matches.

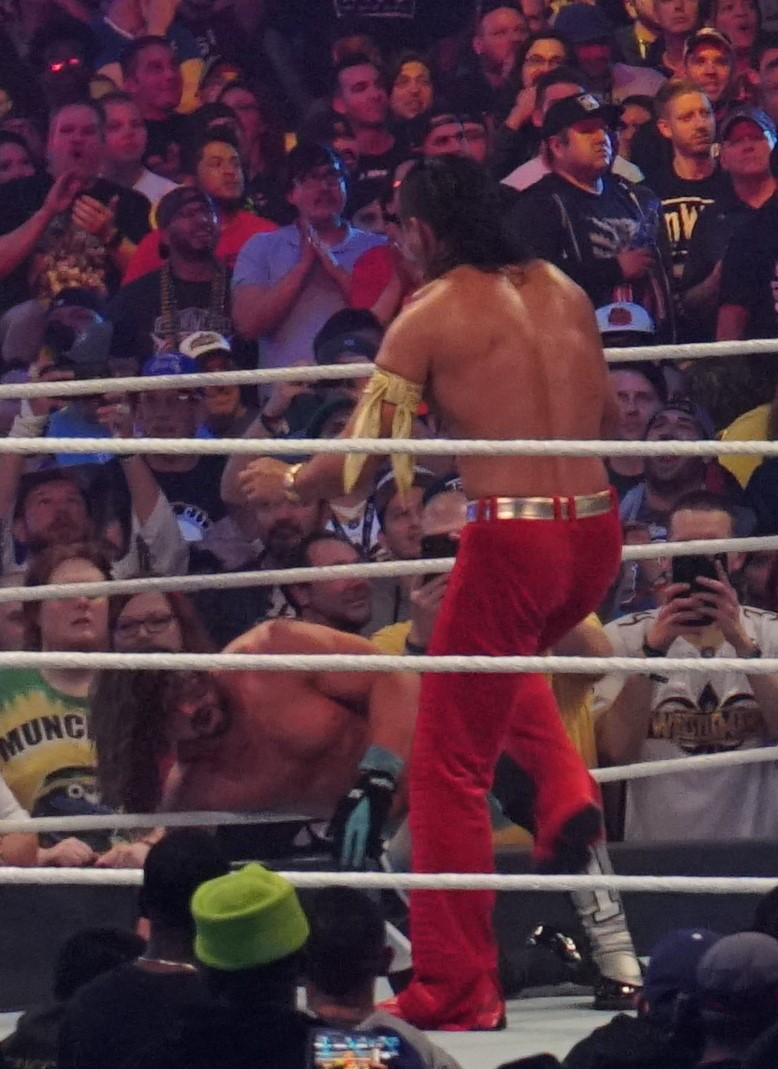
Shinsuke Nakamura attacking AJ Styles after their WWE Championship match at WrestleMania 34, leading to the former's heel turn.

At WrestleMania 34, AJ Styles defeated Shinsuke Nakamura to retain the WWE Championship. After the match, Nakamura attacked Styles with a low blow, turning heel in the process. The two continued to feud through Greatest Royal Rumble and Backlash; their matches ended in draws. On May 14, SmackDown commissioner Shane McMahon announced a fourth rematch between Styles and Nakamura at Money in the Bank, stating every wrestling fan was "looking for a definitive winner". On the May 15 episode of SmackDown, Nakamura defeated Styles in a non-title match to pick the stipulation for the match, and chose a Last Man Standing match.

On the May 15 episode of SmackDown, SmackDown General Manager Paige interrupted SmackDown Women's Champion Carmella's celebration of her reign, and scheduled a title match between her and Asuka for Money in the Bank.

On the May 22 episode of SmackDown, Luke Gallows and Karl Anderson defeated The Usos (Jey Uso and Jimmy Uso) to become the number one contenders for the SmackDown Tag Team Championship, which was held by The Bludgeon Brothers (Luke Harper and Erick Rowan). The match was subsequently scheduled for Money in the Bank, and later for the Kickoff pre-show.

During the 2018 WWE Superstar Shake-up, Big Cass and Daniel Bryan began feuding after Big Cass returned from injury. Cass continued to taunt Bryan on the May 1 episode of SmackDown, calling him "small and weak" and declaring himself to be "a real WWE superstar" while beating up a midget dressed like Bryan. Their feud intensified when Cass eliminated Bryan from the Greatest Royal Rumble match. This led to a match between the two at Backlash which Bryan won; Cass attacked Bryan after the match. Bryan attacked Cass during the May 15 episode of SmackDown and at a house show in Germany, where he injured Cass' leg. As a result, Bryan cost Cass his spot in an upcoming Money in the Bank qualifying match against Joe, and secured that spot for himself by beating Jeff Hardy on the May 22 episode. When Cass recovered and appeared the following week, the bout was turned into a triple threat match, which Joe won. Following the match, Cass again attacked Bryan. On June 2, a rematch between the two was scheduled for Money in the Bank.

== Event ==
Other on-screen personnel
Role:	Name:
English commentators	Michael Cole (Raw/Men's Money In The Bank Ladder Match)
English commentators	Corey Graves (Raw/SmackDown)
English commentators	Jonathan Coachman (Raw/Women's Money In The Bank Ladder Match)
English commentators	Tom Phillips (SmackDown/Women's Money In The Bank Ladder Match)
English commentators	Byron Saxton (SmackDown/Men's Money In The Bank Ladder Match)
Spanish commentators	Carlos Cabrera
Spanish commentators	Marcelo Rodríguez
German commentators	Tim Haber
German commentators	Calvin Knie
Ring announcers	Greg Hamilton (SmackDown/Men's Money In The Bank Ladder Match)
Ring announcers	JoJo (Raw/Women's Money In The Bank Ladder Match)
Referees	Danilo Anfibio
Referees	Jason Ayers
Referees	Mike Chioda
Referees	John Cone
Referees	Dan Engler
Referees	Chad Patton
Referees	Charles Robinson
Referees	Rod Zapata
Interviewers	Charly Caruso
Pre-show panel	Renee Young
Pre-show panel	Booker T
Pre-show panel	Peter Rosenberg
Pre-show panel	David Otunga

=== Pre-show ===
During the Money in the Bank Kickoff pre-show, The Bludgeon Brothers (Harper and Rowan) defended the SmackDown Tag Team Championship against Luke Gallows and Karl Anderson. Harper and Rowan performed The Reckoning on Gallows to retain the titles.

=== Preliminary matches ===
The pay-per-view event began with Big Cass facing Daniel Bryan. Cass began by getting a two count after performing a spinning side slam on Bryan, who retaliated by targeting Cass' left knee with kicks and two dragon screw legwhips. Bryan then slammed Cass' knee into the ring apron and ring post. Cass responded by using a tilt-a-whirl hold on Bryan, who then reversed the hold into a Yes! Lock. Cass reached the ropes to escape the submission, and dominated Bryan by twice gaining a two count and performing a Big Boot for a nearfall. In the climax, Bryan performed a running knee on Cass, who was about to put Bryan in a torture rack, and forced him to submit to a heel hook to win the match.

In the second match, Bobby Lashley fought Sami Zayn. Lashley performed a fallaway slam, a spinebuster, and three vertical suplexes on Zayn to win the match.

In the third match, Seth Rollins defended the Intercontinental Championship against Elias. The bout opened with Elias dominating the first half of the match with a series of dropkicks and Stomps on Rollins before performing a DDT for a nearfall. Rollins countered with a suicide dive and a Blockbuster from the second turnbuckle. Both wrestlers exchanged intense nearfalls, one of which involved Rollins using a Superplex followed by a Falcon Arrow, and another involved Elias performing an Elbow Drop from the top rope. In the end, Rollins pinned Elias with a roll-up while holding Elias' tights to retain the title.

The fourth match was the Women's Money in the Bank Ladder match, which featured Ember Moon, Alexa Bliss, Natalya, and Sasha Banks from Raw, and Becky Lynch, Naomi, Lana, and Charlotte Flair from SmackDown. At the beginning of the match, Moon landed a Somersault Senton on Lynch and slammed Banks through a ladder with a Springboard Dive. Soon after chopping Natalya, Flair tried to use a ladder to get the briefcase but was interrupted by Lynch, who fought over possession of the ladder. Naomi then dropkicked the ladder to take down both the wrestlers. Midway through the match, Lana placed another ladder adjacent to another one that was occupied by Lynch and Banks to get the briefcase. Moon and Natalya interfered, with Natalya pulling Banks off the ladder and executing a Slingshot Powerbomb on her through the ladder, knocking it off along with Lynch. Flair grabbed hold of Moon and Powerbombed Lynch onto the ladder, which Natalya knocked off. Bliss intervened and performed a Code Red on Flair. In the closing moments, Lynch attempted to get the briefcase after performing an exploder suplex on Flair but Bliss tipped over the ladder, causing Lynch to fall. Bliss climbed the ladder and unhooked the briefcase to win the match.

In the fifth match, Roman Reigns fought Jinder Mahal, who was accompanied by an injured Sunil Singh in a wheelchair. As Reigns dominated Mahal in the beginning of the match, Singh rose from his wheelchair and pushed Reigns into the ring post. Mahal took advantage of this by stomping Reigns and applying a Chin Lock. Reigns initially fought his way out of it but Mahal immediately performed a series of rest holds. Reigns came back at Mahal with Leaping Clotheslines. In the climax, Singh attempted to interfere but Reigns performed a Superman Punch and a Spear on him. Mahal subsequently rolled up Reigns for a nearfall but Reigns recovered and performed a Spear on Mahal to win the match.

In the sixth match, Carmella defended the SmackDown Women's Championship against Asuka. Carmella began by kicking Asuka's knees and head before Asuka countered with a Kneebar. Carmella escaped from the hold by touching the ropes. Asuka then performed a High Knee followed by a German Suplex. As Asuka connected with a kick to Carmella and was about to pin her, she was distracted by a person masquerading as her. The masked figure was revealed to be James Ellsworth. Carmella took advantage of the distraction and performed a superkick on Asuka to retain the title.

After that, AJ Styles defended the WWE Championship against Shinsuke Nakamura in a Last Man Standing match. Early in the match, Nakamura aggressively countered Styles' Phenomenal Forearm by kicking Styles' leg. He then used a low blow but Styles avoided it and landed a Pelé Kick. Midway through the bout, Nakamura performed a Kinshasa on Styles on top of the German broadcast table but Styles stood at a nine count. Nakamura threw Styles through a table in the corner in the ring but Styles stood at a nine count. Styles began to target Nakamura's leg and applied the Calf Crusher on Nakamura. Styles began to strike Nakamura with a chair. As Nakamura begged Styles to stop, Styles relented. Seizing the moment, Nakamura retaliated with a low blow but Styles stood at an eight count. At ringside, Nakamura performed another Kinshasa on Styles, who stood at a nine count. Styles then performed a Phenomenal Forearm off a broadcast table on Nakamura and followed up with a Styles Clash off the steel steps, with Nakamura standing at a nine count. Styles performed another Phenomenal Forearm on Nakamura through one of the broadcast tables. Nakamura could not stand up by the ten count and Styles retained the title.

Next, Nia Jax defended the Raw Women's Championship against Ronda Rousey. Jax initially dominated by twice tossing Rousey across the ring and applying the Samoan Drop. As Rousey countered with a kimura lock, Jax overcame it and slammed Rousey with a sitout powerbomb. As Jax went for another sitout powerbomb, Rousey used the hurricanrana throw but Jax caught and dropped her for a two count. Rousey came back by applying the armbar over the ropes on Jax and performed a crossbody for a two count. In the climax, Jax countered an armbar into a roll-up for a two count. Rousey then performed a modified Rock Bottom on Jax and attempted the armbar again but new Ms. Money in the Bank Alexa Bliss appeared and attacked Rousey with her Money in the Bank briefcase to cause a disqualification, allowing Jax to retain the title. Bliss again attacked Rousey and Jax before cashing in the contract. Bliss performed a Bliss DDT and Twisted Bliss on Jax to win the title for a third time.

=== Main event ===
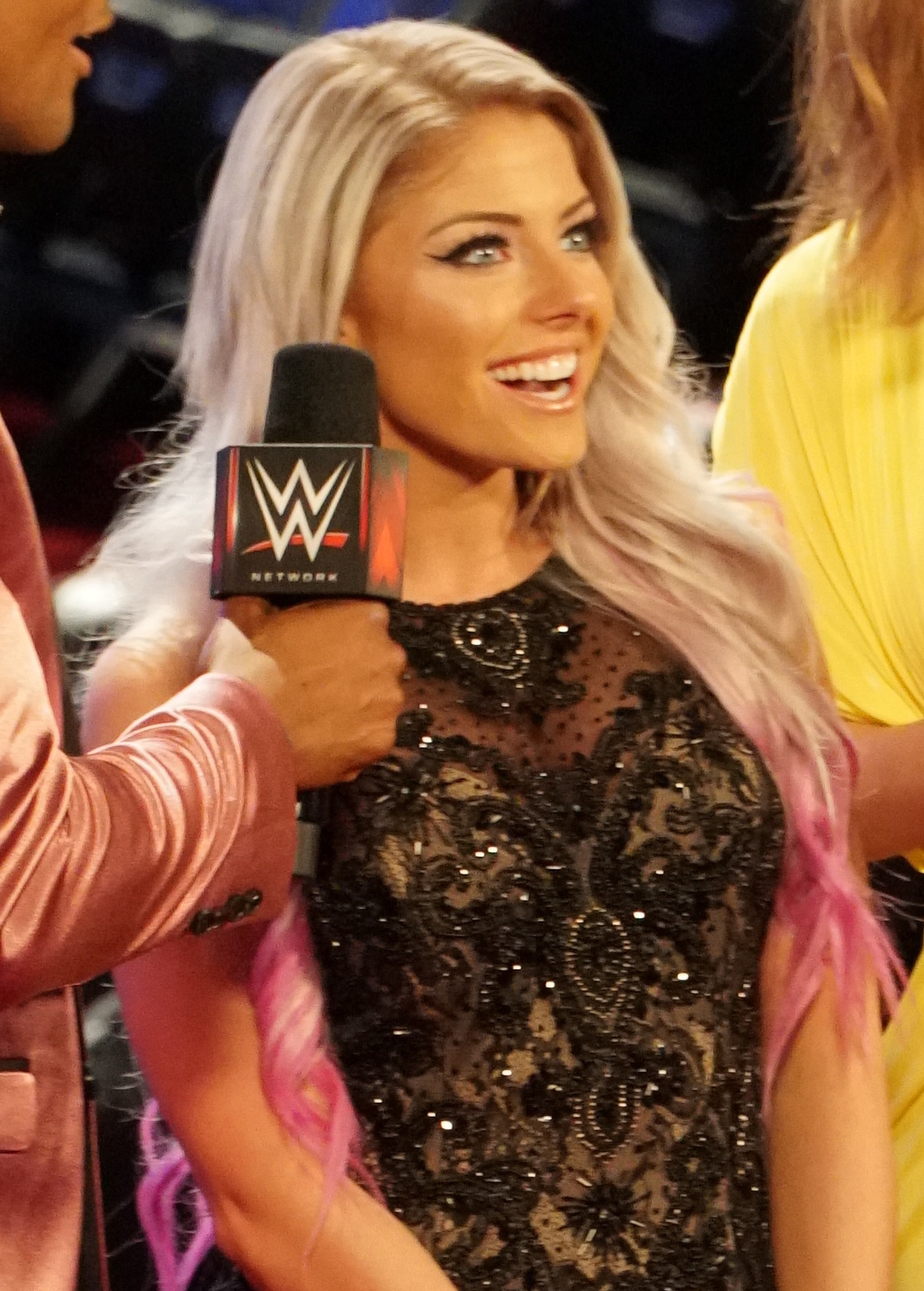
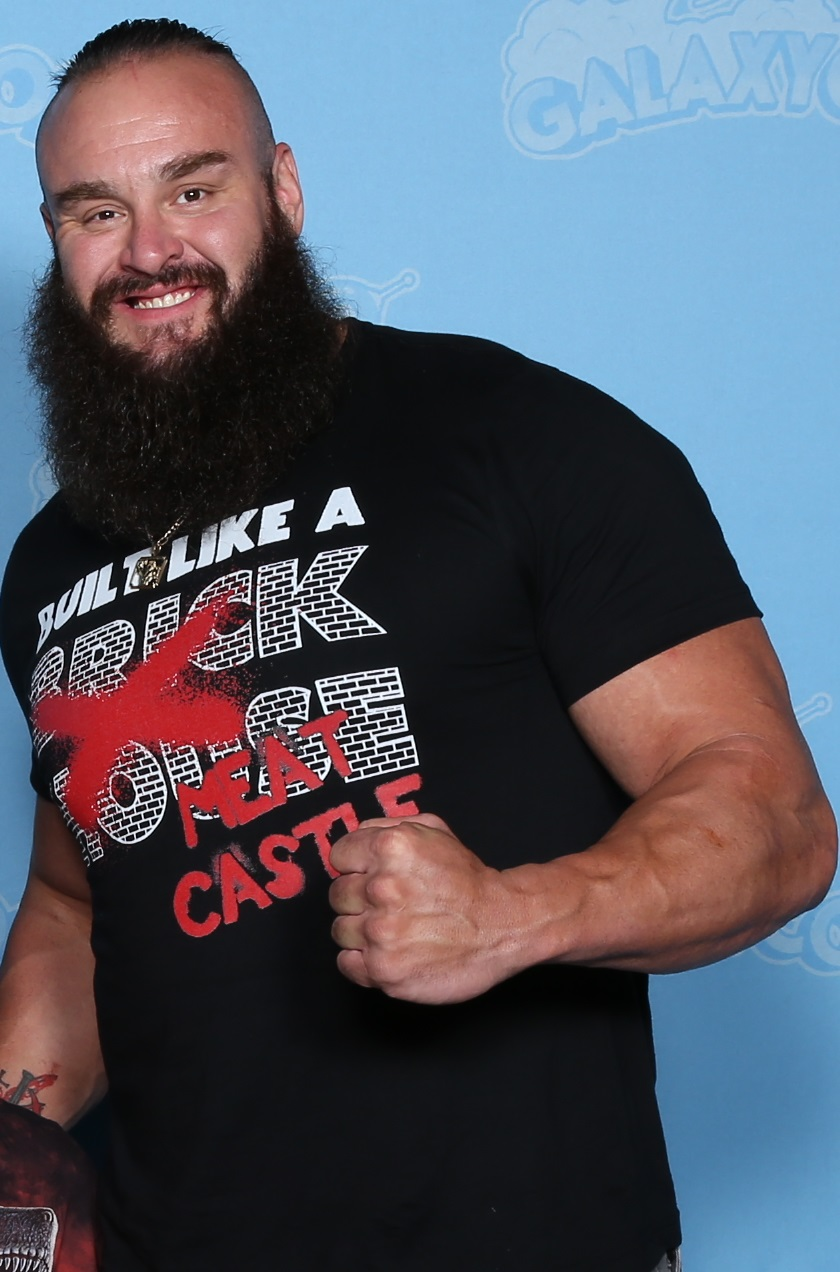
Alexa Bliss and Braun Strowman were the respective winners of the women's and men's Money in the Bank ladder matches.

The main event was the men's Money in the Bank ladder match, which featured Braun Strowman, Finn Bálor, Bobby Roode, and Kevin Owens from Raw, and The Miz, Rusev, Samoa Joe, and one member of The New Day—who was revealed to be Kofi Kingston—from SmackDown. At the start of the match, all of the participants immediately attacked Strowman and buried him underneath a pile of ladders. Each one vied for the ladder; The Miz went first before Kingston performed Trouble in Paradise on Miz. Owens performed a Superkick on Kingston but was knocked out by a double foot stomp from Bálor.

Strowman recovered midway through the bout, and attacked Bálor and Kingston. Together, Joe, Owens, and Rusev temporarily subdued Strowman and placed him on a table, and Owens climbed a large ladder adjacent to the tables to leap unto Strowman. Strowman broke free, climbed the ladder, and threw Owens through the table. Joe then attacked Strowman with a ladder and clotheslined him over the top rope. Bálor then dropkicked Strowman but was subsequently interrupted by Joe. Rusev and Joe then fought, each applying The Accolade and the Coquina Clutch, respectively, on one another. Rusev overcame Joe with a Superkick and climbed the ladder. The Miz then toppled the ladder, causing Rusev to fall. Kingston then confronted The Miz and they traded blows while on opposite sides of the ladder. Roode then knocked over both The Miz and Kingston, and proceeded to climb the ladder. Bálor interfered by kicking Roode and executing a Coup de Grâce off a ladder outside the ring.

In the climax, Bálor climbed the ladder and attempted to get the briefcase but Strowman pulled him off. Strowman then performed Running Powerslams on both Miz and Joe. Bálor and Strowman climbed the opposite sides of the ladder below the Money in the Bank contract briefcase when Kingston jumped onto Strowman's back. Strowman pushed off both wrestlers and unhooked the briefcase to win the match.

== Reception ==
Critics gave the event mixed-to-positive reviews. While the ladder matches, the WWE, Intercontinental, and Raw Women's championship matches garnered positive comments, most of the negativity was directed at the Reigns vs. Mahal match and the Lashley vs. Zayn match.

Ryan Dilbert of Bleacher Report stated the event "felt like it belonged alongside the company's Big Four pay-per-views". Dilbert praised the Last Man Standing match, to which he awarded a grade of A, calling it "a dramatic, emphatic title bout with a string of memorable spots". Dilbert noted AJ Styles and Shinsuke Nakamura "delivered a strong climax to their rivalry here", and that they "looked like warriors". Dilbert praised both Money in the Bank ladder matches; he gave the men's match an A grade, stating it "was a thriller filled with touches of comedy, memorable facial expressions", and that Braun Strowman throwing Kevin Owens off a ladder and through a table "will be shown on highlights for years to come". Dilbert dubbed Strowman "the centerpiece of the buildup of the bout and now emerges from Chicago armed with the Money in the Bank briefcase". Dilbert graded the women's ladder match B+, finding it to be "a fun, nutty contest", and saying it was "wilder and more dangerous than the first women's Money in the Bank ladder match". He said, however, at times the match "felt too choreographed as it moved from spot to spot with little room to breathe". Dilbert gave the Raw Women's Championship match an A− grade, stating Rousey and Jax "were well on their way to a full-on banger" and that "a number of small things felt like big moments". He found Alexa Bliss' Money in the Bank cash-in to be "an exciting swerve", saying "Bliss vs. Rousey has massive potential if that's the direction they're going". Dilbert criticized the Lashley vs. Zayn match, giving it a D grade and saying it was "forgettable" due to "repetitive offense and a lack of emotion", and that the match "was a suplex exhibition that didn't connect". Also, he said the rivalry "has done nothing for either man". He also condemned the Reigns vs. Mahal match, giving it a grade of D− and saying fans chanting "Johnny Gargano!", "This match sucks", and other negative chants made him feel the audience "weren't into this match in the least", and that "WWE following a familiar script with Reigns battling from underneath led to a boring, lifeless match".

Brian Campbell of CBS Sports felt the pay-per-view's final three matches "helped save the show in front of a smart and passionate Chicago crowd". He gave the Lashley vs. Zayn match a D grade calling it "as forgettable as the puzzlingly awful build to get to it", and criticized WWE for "decid[ing] against playing the pre-match video package highlighting how we got here". He also gave the Reigns vs. Mahal match a grade of D, stating "it didn't take three minutes for the match to start before the Chicago crowd drowned the action" because they chanted "this is awful", "CM Punk", "end this match", "boring", and "NXT" during the match. He, however, praised the Last Man Standing match, which he rated B+. Campbell stated the match "turned out to be the best of all, even if it was violently unconventional", that it "took more than two-thirds of the match to come close to the intensity and drama of its climax", and that the ending delivered. Campbell gave the women's Money in the Bank ladder match a grade of C+, stating "there were a number of obvious timing and psychology issues, including multiple performers choosing to take out already fallen opponents on the canvas with a move instead of climbing the ladder or preventing someone else who was seemingly inches away from winning". He also said Alexa Bliss least-deserved to win that match, stating Becky Lynch and Sasha Banks were more deserving of the win, along with "the storyline potential opposite Ronda Rousey that could've come with Natalya winning". He gave the men's Money in the Bank ladder match a grade of B, stating Braun Strowman's win and Strowman being called "Mr. Monster in the Bank" was "somehow both highly predictable and curiously surprising at the same time". Campbell also said; "WWE appears to be listening to the fans who have helped make Strowman arguably the most over superstar in the company and appear poised to give him a huge push entering the summer". Campbell gave the Raw Women's Championship match a grade of A−, stating Ronda Rousey "remains nothing short of a natural inside the ring", and that Rousey's first WWE match "turned out to be one heck of a piece of business". He also said the match "deserves credit for how well it was booked", and called "fantastic", but said Alexa Bliss' Money in the Bank cash-in was "an even better swerve finish".

Dave Meltzer of Wrestling Observer Newsletter rated the matches. The highest-rated matches of the event were the men's Money in the Bank ladder match (4.75 stars), the Last Man Standing match, and the women's Money in the Bank ladder match (both at 4.5 stars). The other rated matches at the event included the Intercontinental Championship match and the Raw Women's Championship match, both getting 4 stars, Daniel Bryan vs. Big Cass getting 2.75 stars, Roman Reigns vs. Jinder Mahal getting 2.5 stars, the SmackDown Tag Team Championship getting 2 stars, the SmackDown Women's Championship match getting 1.5 stars. The Bobby Lashley vs. Sami Zayn match was the lowest-rated match of the event, getting only 1.25 stars.

== Aftermath ==
=== Raw ===
New Raw Women's Champion Alexa Bliss opened the following Raw to talk about her championship win. It was also announced Nia Jax had invoked her championship rematch clause for Extreme Rules. Ronda Rousey interrupted and Bliss insulted Rousey, after which, Rousey attacked Bliss, General Manager Kurt Angle, and a few referees; she was subsequently suspended for 30 days. At Extreme Rules, Bliss, accompanied by Mickie James, defeated Jax in an Extreme Rules match to retain the title; during the match, Rousey, who attended the event as a fan, attacked James. The following night on Raw, Rousey attacked James and Bliss, and was given a one-week extension of her suspension, but also a match against Bliss for the Raw Women's Championship at SummerSlam if she did not break her suspension. At the event, Rousey dominated and defeated Bliss to win the title for the first time.

Kevin Owens and men's Money in the Bank winner Braun Strowman started a feud, leading to a Steel Cage match at Extreme Rules. Owens won the match when Strowman tossed him off the cage and through an announce table. They fought again at SummerSlam with the Money in the Bank contract on the line, with Strowman winning. Also at the event, Roman Reigns defeated Brock Lesnar to win the Universal Championship. Strowman then cashed in the contract on Reigns ahead of time, announcing he would face Reigns in a Hell in a Cell match for the title at Hell in a Cell, which ended in a no-contest when Lesnar attacked both men. This made Strowman the fourth person to fail to win a world championship in their Money in the Bank cash-in match, and the first to fail by a no-contest ruling.

=== SmackDown ===
On the following episode of SmackDown, Rusev, The Miz, Daniel Bryan, Samoa Joe, and Big E competed in a gauntlet match to determine the new number one contender for AJ Styles' WWE Championship at Extreme Rules. Rusev, who last eliminated The Miz, won the match. On the same episode, The Bludgeon Brothers (Harper and Rowan) and Luke Gallows and Karl Anderson had a rematch for the SmackDown Tag Team Championship, which The Bludgeon Brothers again retained. During the gauntlet match, SmackDown Tag Team Champions The Bludgeon Brothers attacked Daniel Bryan, resulting in his elimination.

The following week, Kane returned to save Bryan from a post-match assault from The Bludgeon Brothers, reuniting Team Hell No. SmackDown General Manager Paige then scheduled Team Hell No to face The Bludgeon Brothers for the SmackDown Tag Team Championship at Extreme Rules.

On the following SmackDown, SmackDown Women's Champion Carmella attacked Asuka after a distraction by James Ellsworth. The following week, General Manager Paige scheduled a rematch between Carmella and Asuka for the SmackDown Women's Championship at Extreme Rules with Ellsworth suspended above the ring in a shark cage.

== Results ==
No.	Results	Stipulations	Times
1^{P}	The Bludgeon Brothers (Harper and Rowan) (c) defeated Luke Gallows and Karl Anderson by pinfall	Tag team match for the WWE SmackDown Tag Team Championship	7:00
2	Daniel Bryan defeated Big Cass by submission	Singles match	16:20
3	Bobby Lashley defeated Sami Zayn by pinfall	Singles match	6:35
4	Seth Rollins (c) defeated Elias by pinfall	Singles match for the WWE Intercontinental Championship	17:00
5	Alexa Bliss defeated Becky Lynch, Charlotte Flair, Ember Moon, Lana, Naomi, Natalya, and Sasha Banks	Money in the Bank ladder match for a women's championship match contract Due to Bliss being a Raw wrestler, she earned a contract for a Raw Women's Championship match. Had a SmackDown wrestler won, they would have earned a SmackDown Women's Championship match contract.	18:30
6	Roman Reigns defeated Jinder Mahal (with Sunil Singh) by pinfall	Singles match	15:45
7	Carmella (c) defeated Asuka by pinfall	Singles match for the WWE SmackDown Women's Championship	11:10
8	AJ Styles (c) defeated Shinsuke Nakamura	Last Man Standing match for the WWE Championship	31:15
9	Ronda Rousey defeated Nia Jax (c) by disqualification	Singles match for the WWE Raw Women's Championship	11:05
10	Alexa Bliss defeated Nia Jax (c) by pinfall	Singles match for the WWE Raw Women's Championship; This was Bliss's Money in the Bank cash-in match.	0:35
11	Braun Strowman defeated Bobby Roode, Finn Bálor, Kevin Owens, Kofi Kingston, Rusev, Samoa Joe, and The Miz	Money in the Bank ladder match for a world championship match contract Due to Strowman being a Raw wrestler, he earned a contract for a WWE Universal Championship match. Had a SmackDown wrestler won, they would have earned a WWE Championship match contract.	19:55
(c) / – the champion(s) heading into the match; P / – the match was broadcast on the pre-show
