= James Ellsworth (wrestler) =

American professional wrestler

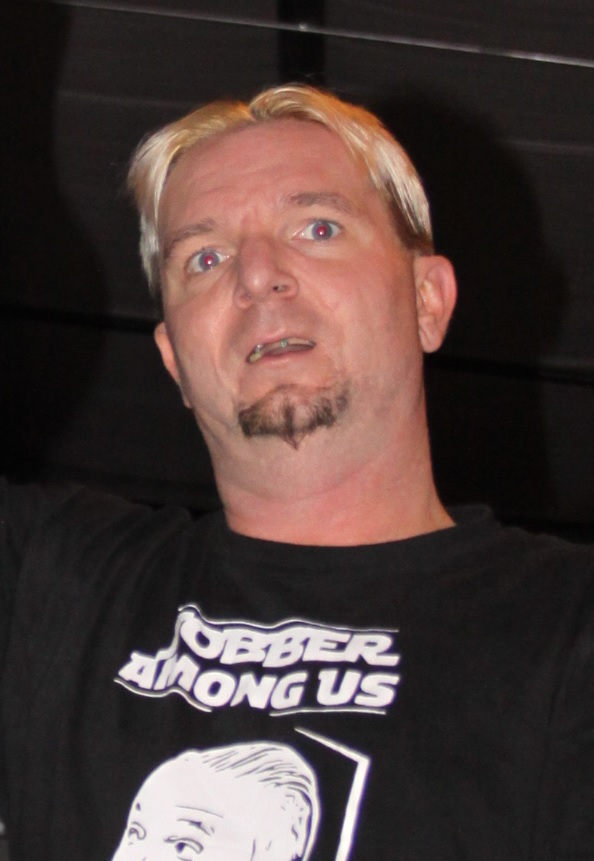
- Ellsworth in 2018

Personal information
- Born: James Ellsworth Morris; December 11, 1984 (age 41) Baltimore, Maryland, U.S.
- Children: 2

Professional wrestling career
- Ring name(s): James Ellsworth; Jimmy Dream
- Billed height: 5 ft 9 in (1.75 m)
- Billed weight: 176 lb (80 kg)
- Trained by: Axl Rotten
- Debut: June 5, 2002

James Ellsworth Morris (born December 11, 1984), is an American professional wrestler, better known by the ring name James Ellsworth. He is best known for his tenure with WWE.

Ellsworth began his career in 2002 and worked for 14 years on the independent circuit as Jimmy Dream. In 2016, he had a squash match against Braun Strowman in WWE. He became famous with the quote “any man with two hands has a fighting chance”. After this appearance, he became very popular with the fans and, months later, WWE signed him to a contract. He was subsequently featured in a high-profile storyline between Dean Ambrose and then-WWE Champion AJ Styles. Later, he began a storyline where he became the manager of Carmella. After his departure from WWE in 2018, he created his own championship, dubbed the Intergender Championship, which he defended in various promotions on the independent circuit.

== Early life ==
Morris was born in Baltimore, Maryland on December 11, 1984. He trained under Axl Rotten. His brother is also an independent wrestler.

== Professional wrestling career ==
=== Independent circuit (2002–2016) ===
Throughout most of his career, Morris has performed on the independent circuit under the ring name "Pretty" Jimmy Dream, often as part of a tag team with Adam Ugly as The Pretty Ugly. The duo has won several regional championships throughout the Northeastern United States, including American Combat Wrestling, Big Time Wrestling and First State Championship Wrestling. Pretty Ugly debuted in 302 Pro Wrestling at their first show.

In 2006, Morris made his Combat Zone Wrestling (CZW) debut at CZW Tournament of Death V teaming with Drew Gulak on a losing end to BLKOUT (Ruckus and Robbie Mireno). Morris returned to CZW again in 2009, losing to Jon Dahmer in a battle royal.

On April 24, 2009 at Covey Promotions All Or Nothing 3, Morris defeated Draven, Thomas Rodriguez and Crazii Shea in a four-way ladder match to become the Covey Promotions Cruiserweight Champion. On June 27 at Hot and Bothered, Morris dropped the championship to Crazii Shea. Morris also runs a professional wrestling promotion known as Adrenaline Championship Wrestling (ACW), which was founded in September 2009.

On June 4, 2016, Pretty Ugly won a tournament to be crowned the inaugural 302 Pro Wrestling Tag Team Champions by defeating The Dub Boys and Riot City's Most Wanted in the tournament finals.

=== WWE ===
==== Early appearances (2014–2016) ====
Prior to his initial WWE run, Morris appeared a couple of times as one of Adam Rose's "Rosebuds" whenever the company was in the Baltimore area. As James Ellsworth, he had his first WWE singles match on the July 25, 2016 episode of Raw as an enhancement talent, being quickly defeated by Braun Strowman. Ellsworth gained some praise and subsequently developed a cult following due to his meek appearance and enthusiastic pre-match promo in which he declared that "any man with two hands has a fighting chance" before being easily defeated by Strowman.

==== WWE Championship pursuit (2016) ====
Ellsworth resurfaced in the main event of the September 14 episode of SmackDown as the mystery tag team partner for WWE World Champion AJ Styles against Dean Ambrose and John Cena, only to be attacked by Intercontinental Champion The Miz (his replacement in the actual match) as he walked down to the ring. On the October 11 episode of SmackDown, Ellsworth was chosen by Styles as his opponent in a non-title match, but SmackDown General Manager Daniel Bryan made Ambrose the special guest referee for the match. Ambrose favored Ellsworth during the match due to his rivalry with Styles, culminating in Ambrose attacking Styles and allowing Ellsworth to win. Ellsworth was granted a championship match the following week, with Ambrose serving as the timekeeper and ring announcer; Ellsworth won the match by disqualification. Ellsworth continued to offer assistance to Ambrose in his rivalry with Styles, but this backfired on the October 25 episode of SmackDown, when Ellsworth accidentally cost Ambrose a match after executing No Chin Music on Styles, disqualifying Ambrose. On the November 1 episode of SmackDown, Ellsworth interfered in the rematch, distracting Styles and allowing Ambrose to win an opportunity for the title. SmackDown Commissioner Shane McMahon also named Ellsworth the SmackDown mascot for the 2016 Survivor Series match on the November 8 episode of SmackDown.

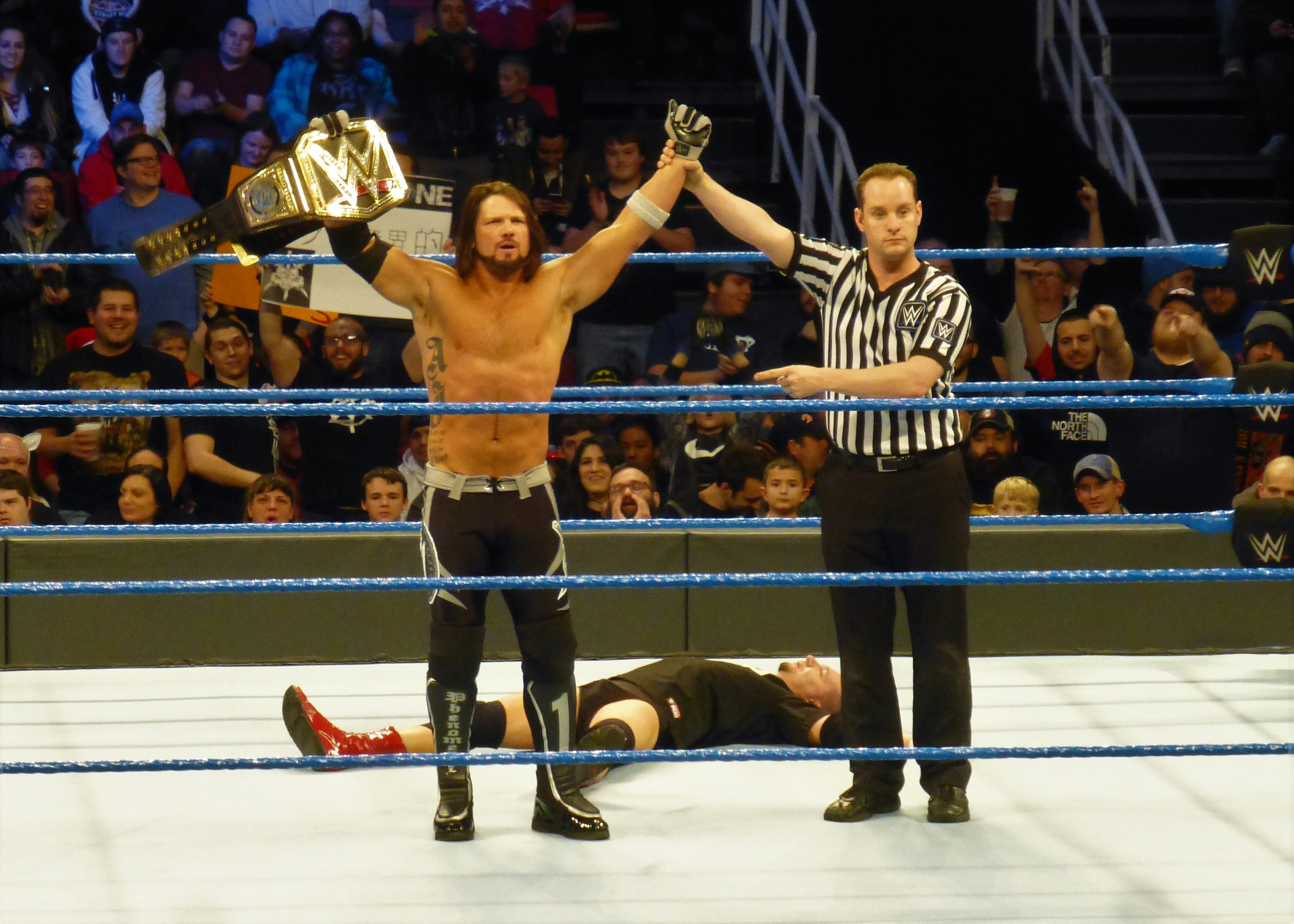
Ellsworth (lying down) after being defeated by AJ Styles for the WWE Championship on an episode of WWE SmackDown in December 2016

During Survivor Series on November 20, Ellsworth helped eliminate Braun Strowman by countout by holding onto his leg, only for Strowman to chase Ellsworth up the ramp and put him through a table, injuring his neck. After legitimately signing a WWE contract, this was worked into a storyline on the November 22 episode of SmackDown, when Styles goaded the injured Ellsworth to face him in a ladder match for the right to be a SmackDown superstar with his contract suspended above the ring; Ellsworth agreed, but wanted another shot at the World Championship should he win the match. That night, Ellsworth defeated Styles to win a SmackDown contract, due to Ambrose helping Ellsworth again. On the November 29 episode of SmackDown, Ellsworth suffered a storyline injury after Styles interrupted his Ambrose Asylum's segment with Ambrose, attacking both and delivering a Styles Clash to Ellsworth off the steel steps, which caused Ellsworth to be taken on a stretcher by medical personnel.

This led Ellsworth interfering on December 4 at TLC: Tables, Ladders & Chairs during the Tables, Ladders and Chairs between Styles and Ambrose to help the latter, but he ended up turning heel by helping Styles instead by pushing Ambrose off the ladder and sent him through two tables. Ellsworth explained that since he had already beaten Styles three times, he helped Styles because he wanted to defeat him again, this time for the World Championship, a match McMahon granted him for the following episode of SmackDown. Ellsworth tried to make it up to Ambrose by helping him defeat The Miz for the Intercontinental Championship on the December 6 episode of SmackDown, but his effort backfired and eventually cost Ambrose the match. Ellsworth's title opportunity was twice postponed, first due to Styles being legitimately injured; and the second time due to Ellsworth suffering from a kayfabe cold. The match eventually happened on the December 20 episode of SmackDown, during which Styles easily defeated Ellsworth in under a minute to end their storyline.

==== Managing Carmella (2017–2018) ====
After his storyline with Styles and Ambrose ended, Ellsworth allied himself with Carmella. On the January 3, 2017 episode of SmackDown, Ellsworth started accompanying Carmella to the ring for her matches, helping her win. Ellsworth entered the 2017 Royal Rumble match at number 11, but was eliminated by Dean Ambrose and Braun Strowman after only 15 seconds. Ellsworth made his WrestleMania debut on April 2 at WrestleMania 33, managing Carmella in the six-pack challenge for the SmackDown Women's Championship which was won by Naomi. On April 25, Carmella and Ellsworth formed an alliance with Natalya and the returning Tamina. On the May 16 episode of SmackDown, Carmella scored a victory over Naomi in a non-title match via distraction from Ellsworth. Dubbed The Welcoming Committee, the team of Carmella, Natalya and Tamina managed by Ellsworth defeated Charlotte Flair, Becky Lynch and Naomi in a six-woman tag team match on May 21 at Backlash. On June 18 at Money In the Bank, he helped Carmella win the first ever Women's Money in the Bank ladder match by pushing Becky Lynch off the ladder and dropping the briefcase to Carmella.

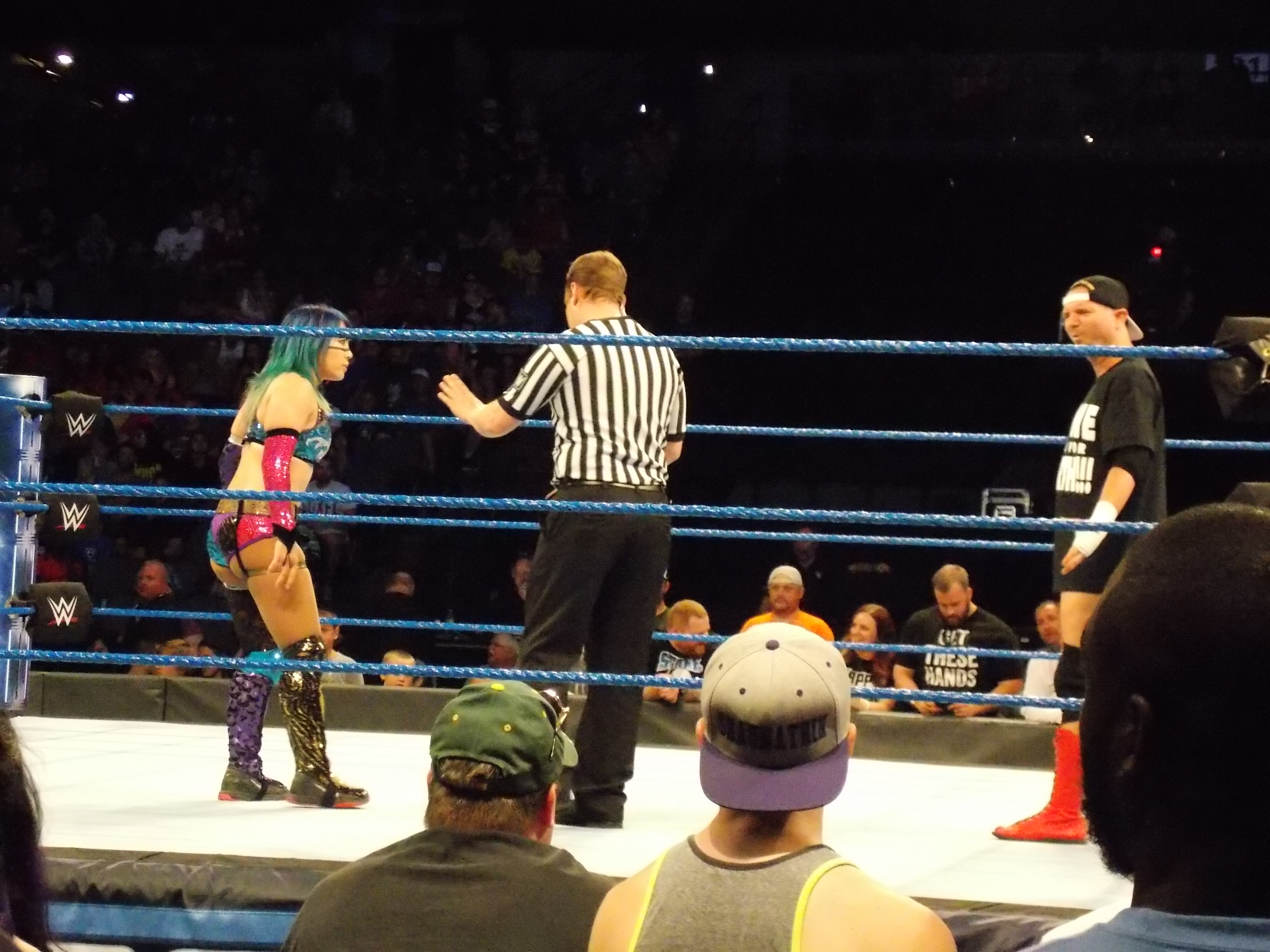
Ellsworth facing off against Asuka in July 2018

Two days later on SmackDown, Carmella was stripped of the briefcase and a second Money in the Bank ladder match was set by SmackDown General Manager Daniel Bryan for the June 27 episode of SmackDown, where Carmella regained the briefcase after she won the second match, once again with the help of Ellsworth, who was initially banned from the arena. On the following episode of SmackDown, he was fined $10,000 and suspended for 30 days by Bryan due to his disobedience. Ellsworth returned on the August 8 episode of SmackDown and once again interfered to help Carmella defeat SmackDown Women's Champion Naomi in a non-title match. After weeks of tension, Ellsworth lost an intergender match to Becky Lynch and was attacked by Carmella after the match on the November 7 episode of SmackDown, ending his relationship with Carmella as well as marking his last appearance in WWE for nearly a year.

On June 17, 2018 at Money in the Bank, Ellsworth made his return to WWE, by helping Carmella retain the SmackDown Women's Championship against Asuka, reestablishing himself as a heel and reigniting his on-screen relationship with Carmella from 2017 on a night to night contract. At Extreme Rules, Ellsworth was suspended above the ring in a shark cage during Asuka's rematch with Carmella. Ellsworth tried to escape the cage after breaking the lock, only to become entangled and stuck, distracting Asuka and allowing Carmella to defeat her. On the July 24 episode of SmackDown, Ellsworth interrupted a SummerSlam WWE Championship contract signing between AJ Styles and Samoa Joe, during which Ellsworth got fired after he insulted General Manager Paige. He later appeared at SmackDown 1000, on a video uploaded to WWE's website and YouTube account, where he claimed he should have been a part of the show.

=== Return to independent circuit (2018–present) ===
On January 21, 2018, Ellsworth made an appearance for Destiny World Wrestling, where he won the first-ever Santino Cobra Cup, interfering in a match between Austin Aries and Pete Dunne and using his Cobra Cup win to challenge Dunne to a match which he lost via pinfall. On February 11, Ellsworth appeared for Championship Wrestling From Hollywood, where he challenged Nick Aldis for the NWA World Heavyweight Championship, but he was defeated. On February 20, Ellsworth proclaimed himself the World Intergender Champion, creating his own championship. The first defense of the World Intergender Championship came on February 22 at BAR Wrestling, where he defeated Joey Ryan. Ellsworth teamed with Gillberg and captured the ACW Tag Team Championship a second time on April 1. On June 2, Ellsworth and Gillberg would lose the ACW Tag Team to The Bully Club, Buzz Stryker & Rayburn. On September 2, Ellsworth teamed with Frank The Clown losing to former WCW World Heavyweight Champion David Arquette and RJ City in a tag team match at Warrior Wrestling 2.

On June 29, 2019 Ellsworth unsuccessfully challenged Doyle Day for the ACW Heavyweight Title. On August 11, Ellsworth defeated Super Oprah to win the Black Diamond Wrestling Rated R Championship. On January 26, 2020 Ellsworth defeated both Sicend and Chris Slade in a triple threat match to win the ACW Lightweight Heavyweight Championship. On February 28, Ellsworth would lose the title to former tag team partner Gillberg. On July 24, 2021 Ellsworth teamed with Action Andretti to unsuccessfully challenge Breaux Keller and Joe Keys for the MCW Tag Team Championships. On August 13, he and tag partner Claude Marrow Jr. would also lose a ACW Tag Team championship match to Ben Bishop and Michael's Amaydo.

On March 19, 2022, Ellsworth defeated Chris Slade to win the PWX Heavyweight Championship. On May 7, he and tag partner Horsepower, defeated Prince Mackaveli and Tony Macko and The Plague Of Corvus in a three way tag match to capture the PWX Tag Team Championships. On June 5, Ellsworth and Ruckus won the ACW Tag Team Championships beating Doyle Day and Vam Williams, this marked Ellsworth’s third reign with the title. On July, 24 they lost the titles in a street fight rematch.

On April 15, 2023 Ellsworth and tag team partner Doug Delicious defeated Hoss Hagood and LK to win the PYDW Tag Team Championships. On November 11, Ellsworth lost a MCW Rage Television championship match vs. Myles Hawkins via disqualification. The two later had a rematch on December 9, where Ellsworth beat Hawkins to win the championship. The feud calumniated in a third and final match on December, 30 with Ellsworth losing the title. Following his feud with Hawkins Ellsworth then failed to capture the Imagine Heavyweight championship on January 6, 2024 vs. Gorgeous Gregory. On August 17, Ellsworth challenged Doyle Day for the ACW United States Championship, Ellsworth won the match however it was via qualification so he did not receive the title. On November 21, Ellsworth lost to Vam Williams for the vacant ACW Championship.

On March 30, 2025 Ellsworth defeated Marko Harris to win the EPW Heavyweight Title.

=== Impact Wrestling (2018) ===
On October 15, 2018, Ellsworth made an appearance at Impact Wrestling pay-per-view Bound for Glory, losing against Eli Drake.

== Personal life ==
In April 2022 Morris announced on his instagram that he had married his wife.

== Championships and accomplishments ==
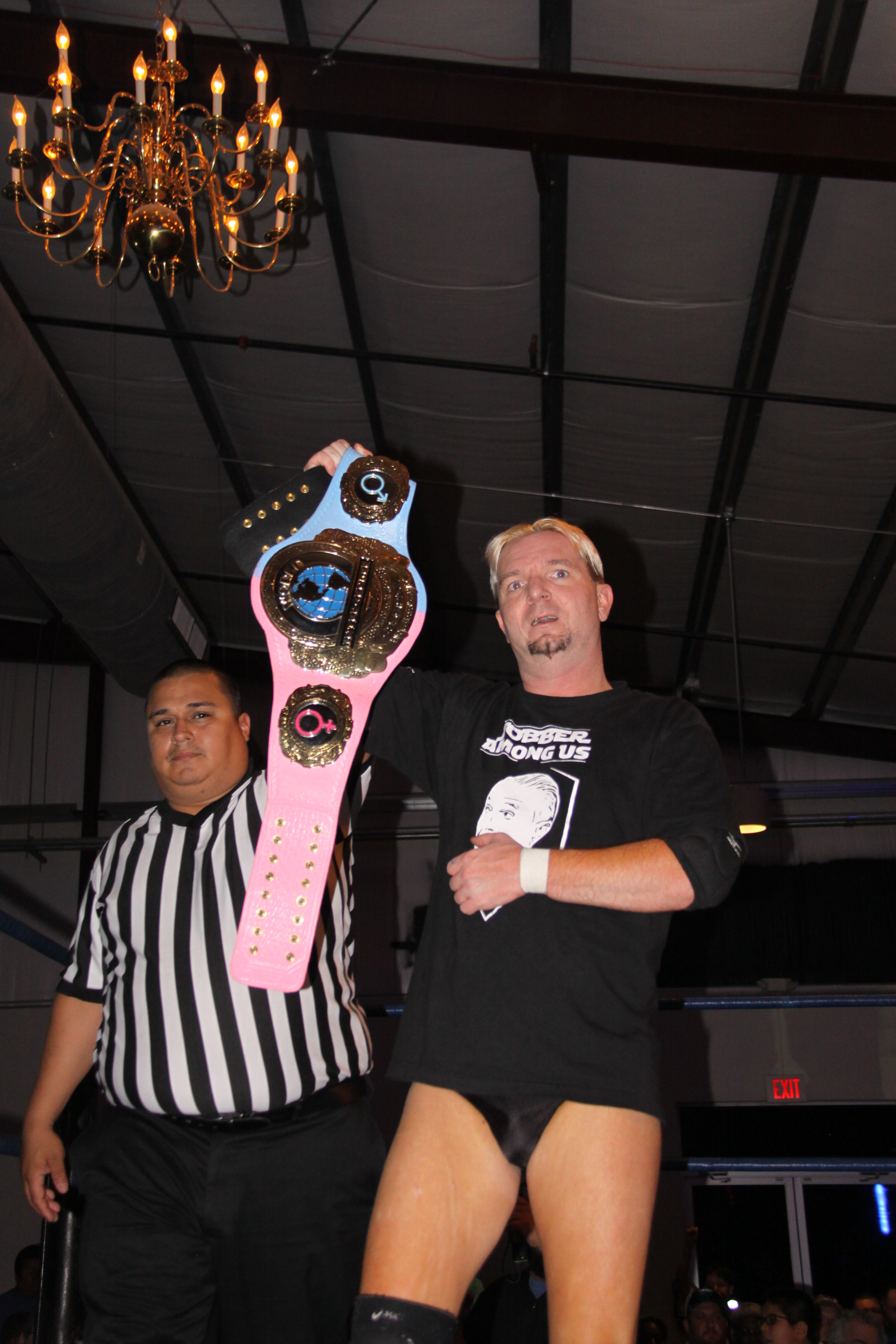
After leaving WWE, Ellsworth proclaimed himself the Intergender Champion

- EPW Wrestling
  - EPW Heavyweight Championship (1 time)
- 302 Pro Wrestling
  - 302 Pro Wrestling Tag Team Championship (1 time, inaugural) – with Adam Ugly
  - 302 Tag Team Championship Tournament (2016) – with Adam Ugly
- Adrenaline Championship Wrestling
  - ACW Light Heavyweight Championship (1 times)
  - ACW Tag Team Championship (3 times) – with Adam Ugly (1) Gillberg (1) and Ruckus (1)
- Cactus League Wrestling
  - CLW Rated-R Championship (1 time)
- Covey Promotions
  - CP Cruiserweight Championship (1 time)
  - CP Tag Team Championship (1 time) – with Adam Ugly
- Destiny Wrestling
  - Cobra Cup (2018)
- First State Championship Wrestling
  - FSCW World Tag Team Championship (2 times) – with Adam Ugly (1) and Reggie Reg (1)
- Grim's Toy Show Wrestling
  - GTS Inter-Gender Championship (1)
  - GTS Tag Team Championship (2 times) – with Grim
  - Easter Egg Hunt Winner (2018)
- International Wrestling Cartel
  - IWC High Stakes Championship (1 time)
- Pay You Dues Wrestling
  - PYDW Tag Team Championship (1 time) – with Doug Delicious
- Maryland Wrestling Federation
  - MWF Junior Heavyweight Championship (1 time)
- Maximum Championship Wrestling
  - MCW Cruiserweight Championship (4 times)
- Black Diamond Wrestling
  - BDW Rated R Championship (1 time)
- Power Pro Wrestling
  - PPW Tag Team Championship (1 time) – with Adam Ugly
- Power Wrestling Express
  - PWX Heavyweight Championship (1 time)
  - PWX Tag Team Championship (1 time) – with Horsepower
- MCW Pro Wrestling
  - MCW Rage Television Championship (1 time)
- Pro Wrestling Illustrated
  - Ranked No. 410 of the top 500 singles wrestlers in the PWI 500 in 2017
- Undisputed Championship Wrestling
  - UCW Heavyweight Championship (3 times)
  - Dominic Denucci Tournament (2011)
