= Money in the Bank (2011) =

WWE pay-per-view event

- Promotional poster featuring Big Show, Hornswoggle and various WWE wrestlers
- Promotion: WWE
- Brand(s): Raw; SmackDown
- Date: July 17, 2011
- City: Rosemont, Illinois
- Venue: Allstate Arena
- Attendance: 14,815
- Buy rate: 205,000

Pay-per-view chronology
| ← Previous; Capitol Punishment | Next → SummerSlam |

Money in the Bank chronology
| ← Previous; 2010 | Next → 2012 |

The 2011 Money in the Bank was a professional wrestling pay-per-view (PPV) event produced by WWE. It was the second annual Money in the Bank and took place on July 17, 2011, at the Allstate Arena in Rosemont, Illinois, United States, held for wrestlers from the promotion's Raw and SmackDown brand divisions. The event centered on the men's Money in the Bank ladder match, a multi-person ladder match where the wrestlers compete to retrieve a briefcase hanging above the ring which contains a contract for a guaranteed world championship match at any time within the next year.

Seven matches were contested at the event, including one dark match before the broadcast. In the main event, CM Punk defeated John Cena to win Raw's WWE Championship and as per the stipulation, Cena was fired in storyline. In another prominent match, Christian defeated Randy Orton by disqualification and as per the stipulation, he won SmackDown's World Heavyweight Championship. There were two Money in the Bank ladder matches, one for each brand. Alberto Del Rio won Raw's ladder match against Alex Riley, Evan Bourne, Jack Swagger, Kofi Kingston, Rey Mysterio, R-Truth, and The Miz for a future WWE Championship match, while in SmackDown's ladder match, which was the opening bout, Daniel Bryan won against Cody Rhodes, Heath Slater, Justin Gabriel, Kane, Sheamus, Sin Cara, and Wade Barrett for a future World Heavyweight Championship match.

Money in the Bank was broadcast globally and received positive reviews from critics, with the main event receiving the most praise. For pay-per-view buys, 205,000 customers paid to watch the event compared with 165,000 for the previous year. This was the first Money in the Bank event held to be promoted under the company's shortened trade name of WWE, as following WrestleMania XXVII in April, the company ceased using its full name of World Wrestling Entertainment, although that remains the legal name of the company. This was also the last Money in the Bank held under the first brand extension, which ended in August, but was reinstated in July 2016.

== Production ==
=== Background ===
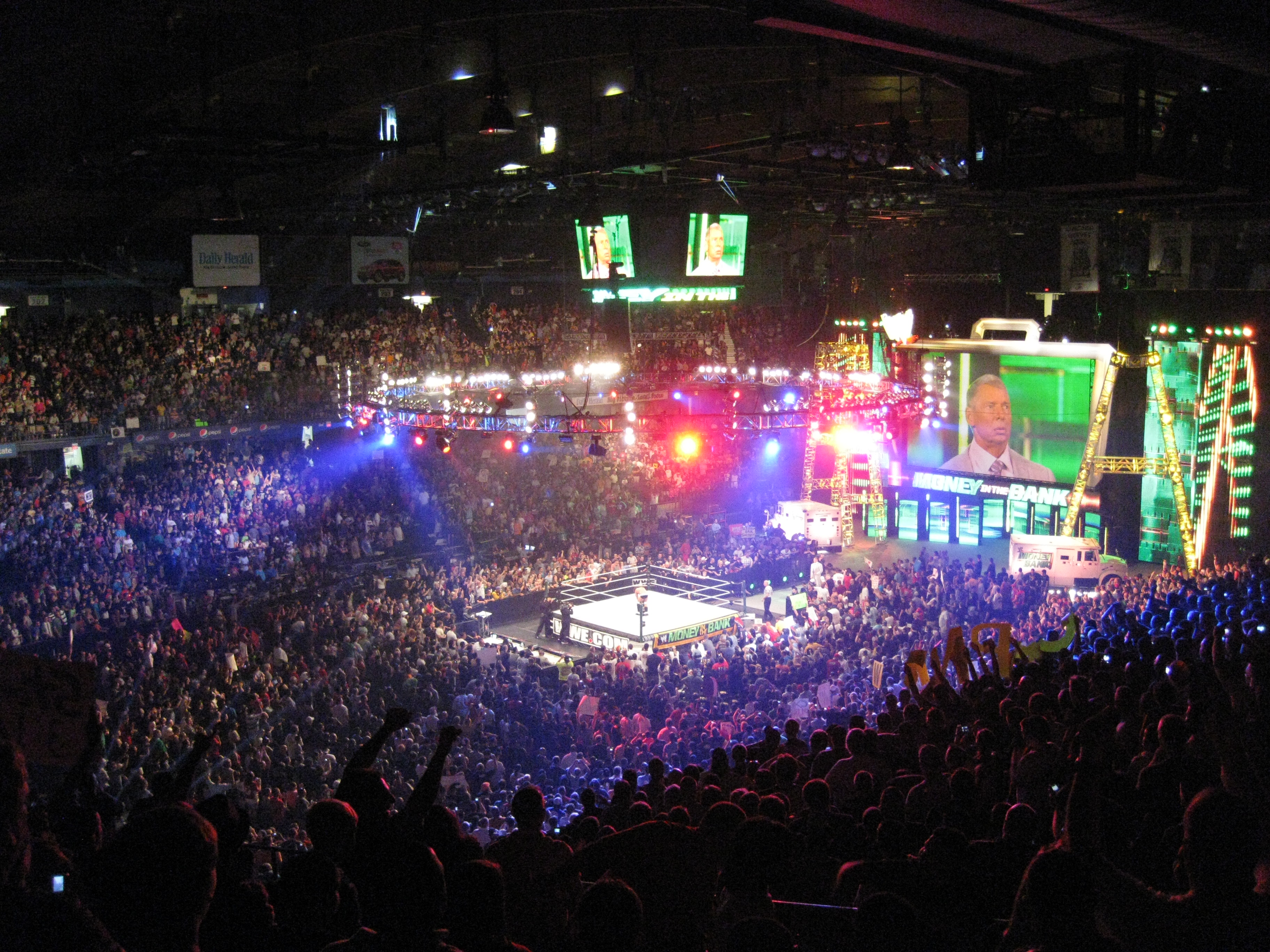
A view of the event from within the Allstate Arena.

In 2010, the professional wrestling company WWE established Money in the Bank as a pay-per-view (PPV) event and it was held in July. The concept of the event came from WWE's established Money in the Bank ladder match that was originally held at WrestleMania from 2005 to 2010. The match features multiple wrestlers using ladders to retrieve a briefcase hanging above the ring. The briefcase contains a contract that guarantees the winner a match for a world championship at any time within the next year. After the establishment of the event, the match ceased being held at WrestleMania.

A second Money in the Bank event was scheduled for July 17, 2011, at the Allstate Arena in the Chicago suburb of Rosemont, Illinois, and featured wrestlers from the Raw and SmackDown brands. Like the 2010 event, two Money in the Bank ladder matches were scheduled for the 2011 event. One was for wrestlers from Raw with its contract being for a WWE Championship match, while the other was for the SmackDown brand, which granted a World Heavyweight Championship match contract.

Tickets went on sale in May 2011 through Ticketmaster with prices ranging from US$25 to $300. This was the first Money in the Bank event held to be promoted under the company's shortened trade name of WWE, as following WrestleMania XXVII in April, the company ceased using its full name of World Wrestling Entertainment, although that remains the legal name of the company.

=== Storylines ===
The professional wrestling matches at Money in the Bank featured professional wrestlers performing as characters in scripted events predetermined by the hosting promotion, WWE. Storylines between the characters were produced on WWE's weekly television shows Raw and SmackDown with the Raw and SmackDown brands—storyline divisions in which WWE assigned its employees to different programs. These storylines provided the background to the 2011 event, which continued the storylines from the previous event in WWE's 2011 pay-per-view schedule, Capitol Punishment.

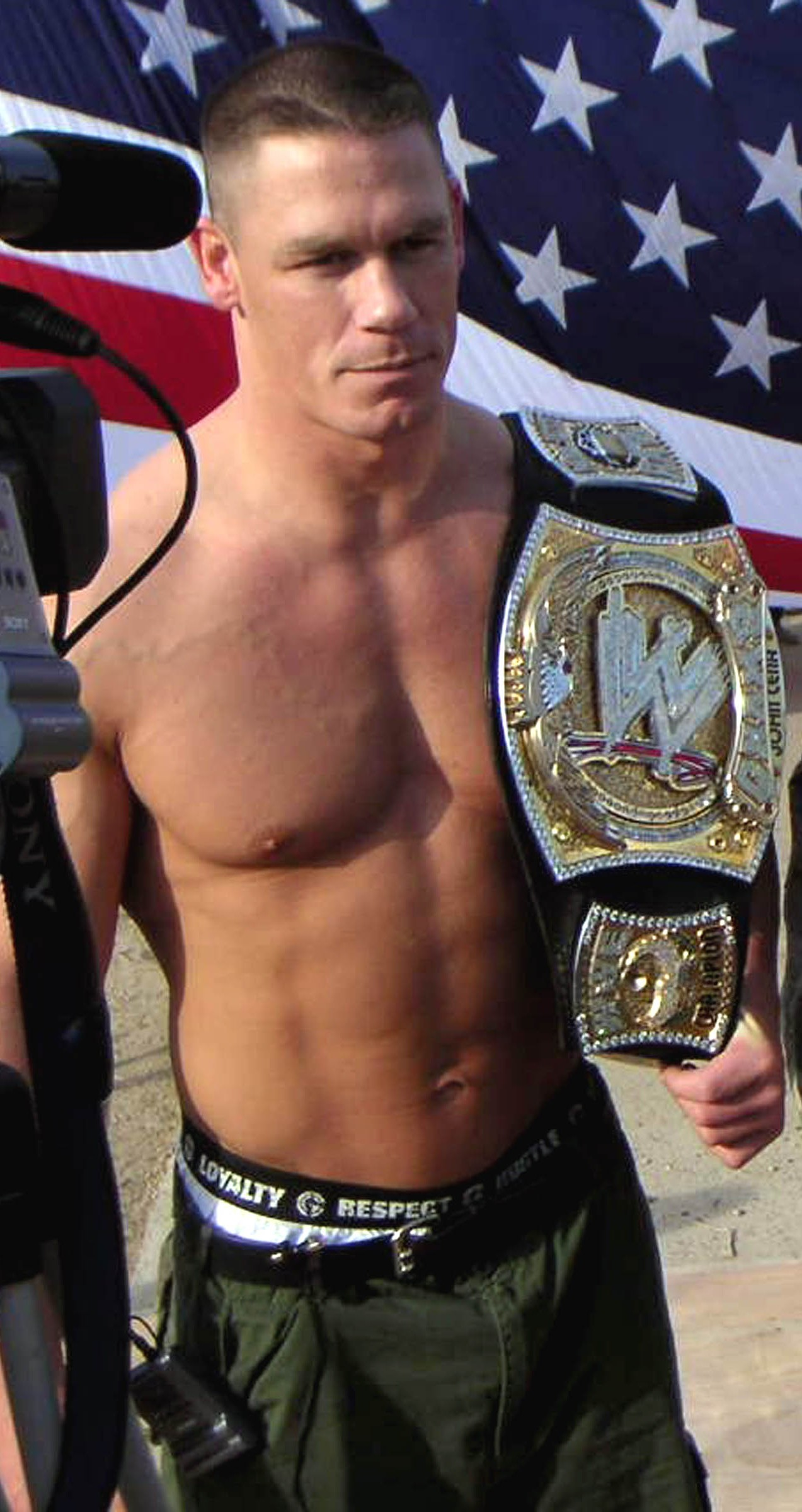
John Cena defended Raw's WWE Championship against CM Punk at this event

The main event featured John Cena defending the WWE Championship against CM Punk. Punk defeated Cena in a non-title match on the June 13 episode of Raw (after a distraction from R-Truth on Cena), and then became the number one contender by winning a triple threat Falls Count Anywhere match against Alberto Del Rio and Rey Mysterio on the June 20 episode of Raw. After the match, Punk revealed that his WWE contract would expire at midnight on July 17, immediately after the Money in the Bank PPV ended; Punk vowed to win the championship and leave the company with it. On the next episode of Raw, Punk cost Cena a tables match against R-Truth, then delivered a worked shoot promo, colloquially dubbed "the pipebomb", saying that he, rather than Cena, was "the best in the world"; he also berated WWE for not promoting him properly. Punk called Cena an "ass-kisser" and insulted WWE management—including chairman Vince McMahon and executive John Laurinaitis and saying that Dwayne Johnson was main eventing next year's WrestleMania that made him sick. In addition to saying that he was breaking the fourth wall by talking to the camera, Punk proposed that he could defend the WWE Championship by wrestling in other companies such as Ring of Honor (ROH) and New Japan Pro-Wrestling (NJPW) after leaving the company with the title. As a result, Punk was given a storyline suspension and stripped of his championship match. Cena confronted McMahon and threatened to walk out on him and return the WWE Championship if Punk were not reinstated. McMahon relented on the condition that if Cena lost the title, he would be fired. On the following episode of Raw, McMahon tried to persuade Punk to sign a new contract to ensure the WWE Championship would stay in WWE; McMahon agreed to Punk's demands and apologized to Punk before Cena interrupted the proceedings. The segment resulted in Cena punching Punk, so Punk tore up the agreed contract teasing a face turn for Punk.

The main feud from SmackDown was Randy Orton defending the World Heavyweight Championship against Christian. The storyline started on the May 6 episode of SmackDown, when Orton defeated Christian to become the champion less than a week after Christian had won the title. Christian would then invoke his rematch clause against Orton at Over the Limit, in which he lost. At Capitol Punishment on June 19, Orton defeated Christian to retain the title again by pinning him, after the referee failed to notice his foot under the bottom rope. On the June 24 episode of SmackDown, Christian demanded another attempt at the title from SmackDown General Manager Theodore Long; his demand was granted with the proviso that he could defeat Kane. Christian lost the match against Kane by disqualification after interference from Mark Henry. Long then made a tag team match for later that same episode, pitting the team of Christian and Henry against Kane and Orton with a similar stipulation, where Henry pinned Orton to win the match. Afterward, Long offered Henry an attempt at the championship if Henry could defeat Orton again. Henry lost the match by countout after Christian engineered a distraction. This set up a match between Orton and Christian for the title at Money in the Bank. On the July 8 episode of SmackDown, Christian's lawyers in the storyline added a stipulation to the match that if Orton was disqualified or there was "poor officiating", he would lose the title to Christian.

The Raw Money in the Bank competitors were announced on the June 27 episode of Raw with no qualifying matches; these were Alberto Del Rio, Alex Riley, Evan Bourne, Jack Swagger, Kofi Kingston, Rey Mysterio, R-Truth, and The Miz. The SmackDown Money in the Bank competitors were announced on the July 1 SmackDown as Cody Rhodes, Daniel Bryan, Heath Slater, Justin Gabriel, Kane, Sheamus, Sin Cara, and Wade Barrett.

The feud between Big Show and Mark Henry started on the June 17 episode of SmackDown, when Big Show was forced to face Henry in a match. Big Show knocked out Henry before the bout began, creating a rivalry between the two. Henry interfered in Big Show's matches with Alberto Del Rio at Capitol Punishment and on the June 27 episode of Raw in a steel cage match. Henry versus Big Show was later announced for Money in the Bank.

When Brie Bella lost her Divas Championship to Kelly Kelly on the June 20 episode of Raw, a title rematch was announced for Money in the Bank. Kelly had been feuding with the Bella Twins (Nikki and Brie Bella) since May 2011.

== Event ==
Other on-screen personnel
| Role: | Name: |
|---|---|
| English Commentators | Michael Cole |
| English Commentators | Jerry Lawler |
| English Commentators | Booker T |
| Spanish Commentators | Carlos Cabrera |
| Spanish Commentators | Hugo Savinovich |
| Ring announcers | Tony Chimel |
| Ring announcers | Justin Roberts |
| Referees | Mike Chioda |
| Referees | John Cone |
| Referees | Scott Armstrong |
| Referees | Charles Robinson |

=== Preliminary matches ===
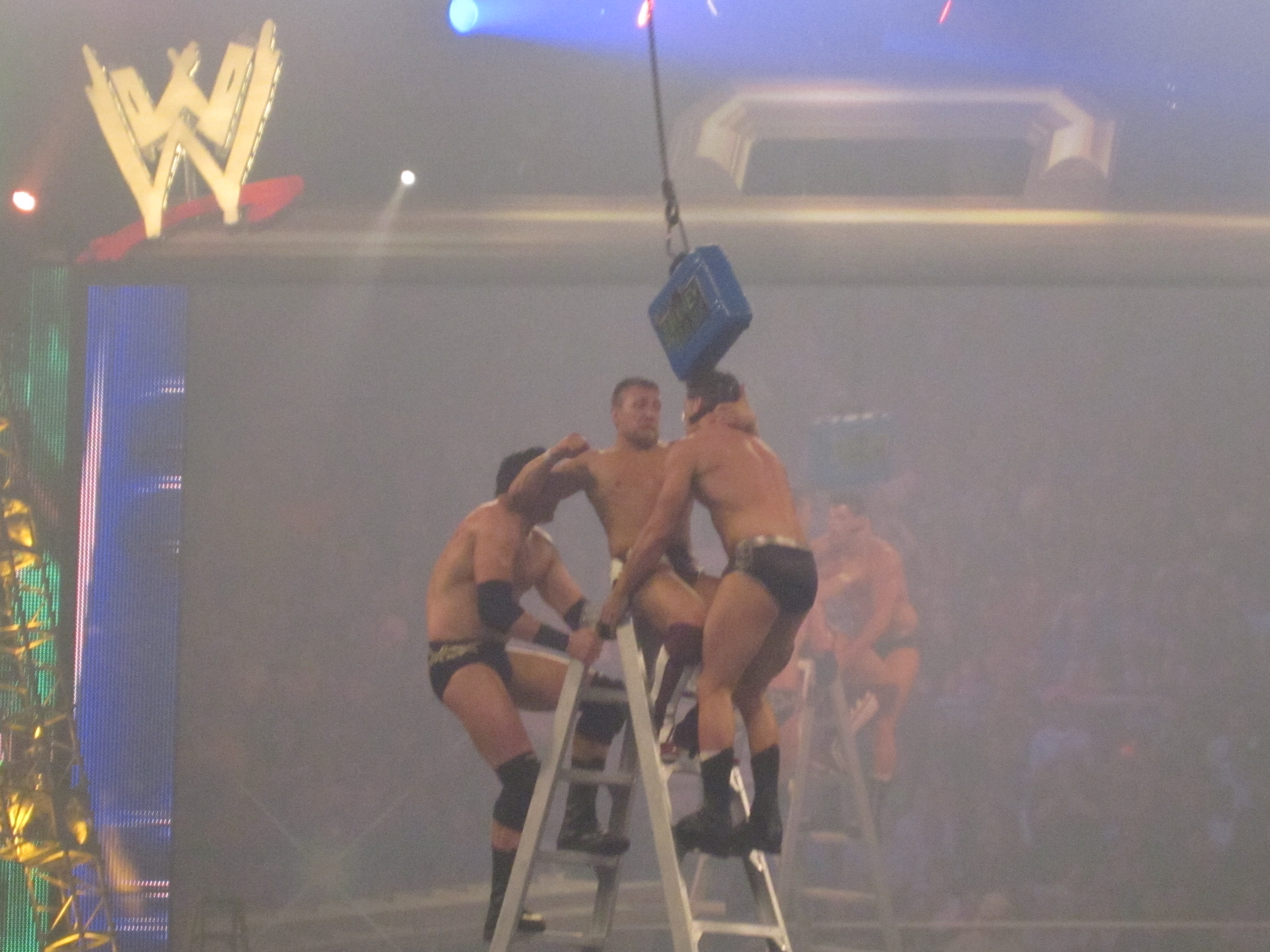
The opening match ended with Daniel Bryan (center) fighting off Wade Barret (left) and Cody Rhodes (right) to grab SmackDown's Money in the Bank briefcase

The event, featuring commentary by Michael Cole, Jerry Lawler, and Booker T, began with the SmackDown Money in the Bank ladder match. During the bout, Sheamus slammed Sin Cara through a ladder propped between the ring apron and the announcers' table with a powerbomb. The ladder was bent in half and Cara was stretchered away from ringside. Near the end of the match, Barrett, Rhodes and Bryan were the only three in the ring. Bryan put Rhodes in a guillotine choke submission hold on top of the ladder in the middle of the ring while Barrett sneaked up the other side of the ladder. After Bryan knocked Rhodes off the ladder, Barrett got Bryan onto his shoulders and tried to throw him off. Bryan countered with repeated elbow strikes to Barrett's head. Bryan then kicked Barrett in the head and unhooked the briefcase to win the contest.

In the show's second match, Kelly Kelly defeated Brie Bella to retain the Divas Championship. Kelly won the bout after performing her K2 maneuver on Brie.

In the show's third match, Mark Henry defeated Big Show. Henry gained a two-count after a World's Strongest Slam on Big Show. Henry then performed the move again and two running splashes for the pinfall victory. After the match, Henry wrapped a chair around Big Show's ankle and jumped on it, causing an injury to Big Show.

The next match was the Raw Money in the Bank match, where all the wrestlers brought ladders. During the match, Evan Bourne performed his signature Air Bourne aerial maneuver, diving from a ladder and landing on the other wrestlers at ringside. Bourne and Miz went for the briefcase but Del Rio toppled their ladder, and Miz was taken backstage with a knee injury. The seven remaining wrestlers simultaneously climbed four ladders in the ring, but fell off one by one. With nobody left in the ring, Miz hopped down to the ring and climbed the ladder with one leg, but Mysterio stopped him by slamming him off the ladder with a sunset flip powerbomb. As Mysterio and Del Rio battled on top of the ladders for the briefcase, Del Rio distracted Mysterio by unmasking him and then pushing him onto another ladder, which tipped over and sent both wrestlers to the mat. Del Rio regrouped and unhooked the briefcase to win the match.

In the show's fifth match, Randy Orton defended his World Heavyweight Championship against Christian, with the stipulation that Christian would win the title if Orton was disqualified or if there was poor officiating. Christian opened the bout by bringing a steel chair into the ring and trying to goad Orton into getting himself disqualified. Orton balked and threw the chair to the floor. Christian performed his signature Killswitch, but Orton kicked out of the pin at the two count. As Orton was prepared to perform his signature RKO move, Christian spat in his face. An enraged Orton kicked Christian in the groin and in the process, a disqualification was called on Randy. As per the pre-match stipulation, Christian became the new champion. Afterwards, Orton viciously attacked Christian and gave him two more RKOs onto the announce table.

=== Main event match ===
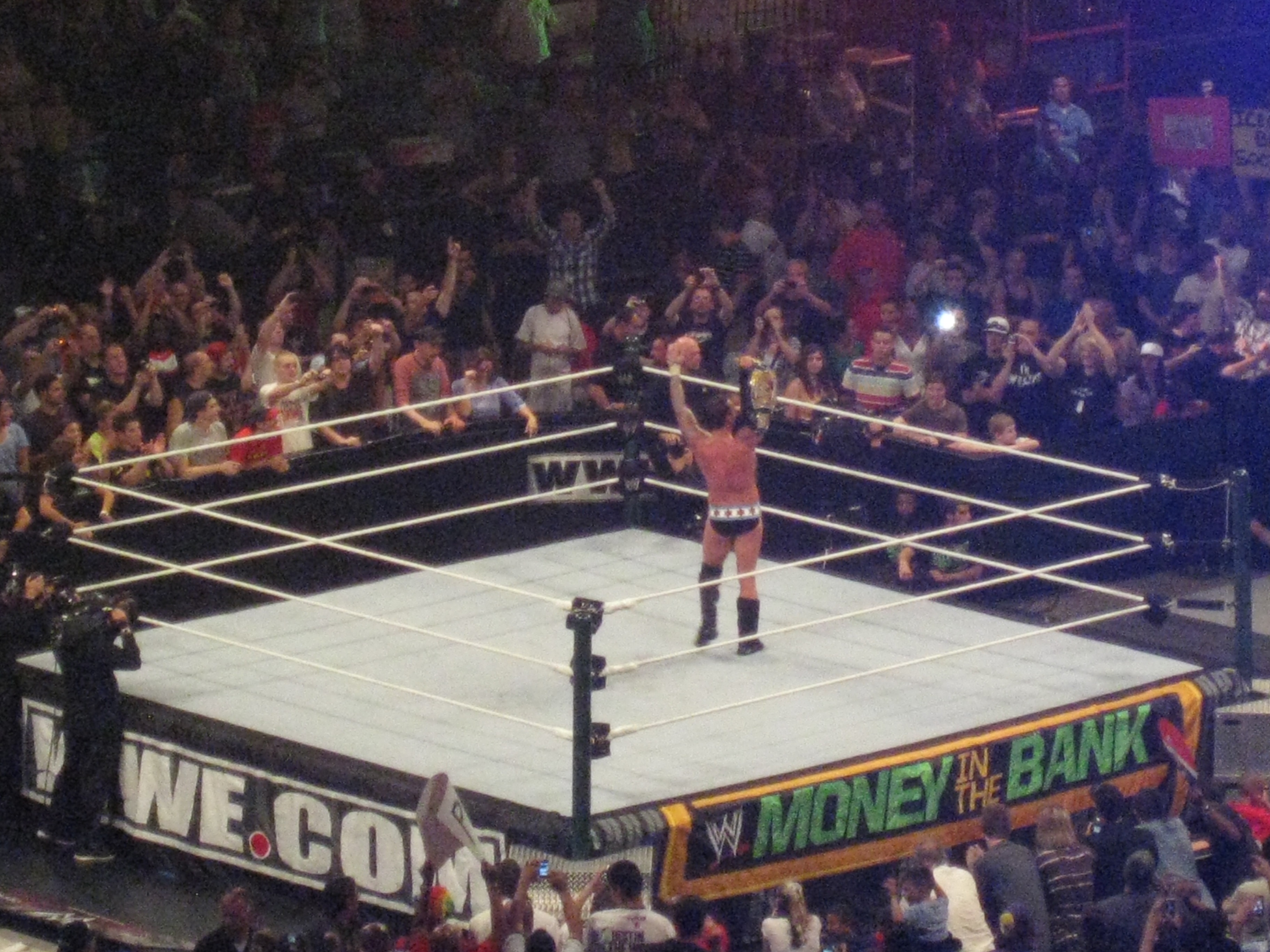
After his win in the main event, CM Punk celebrated with Raw's WWE Championship

The final match was for the WWE Championship between Champion John Cena and CM Punk. WWE Chairman Vince McMahon had threatened to have Cena fired if he did not retain the title. During the match, two separate signature Attitude Adjustment moves by Cena failed to score the victory. More than 30 minutes into the match, Punk performed his Go To Sleep maneuver, striking Cena's ribs and causing Cena to fall out of the ring. As Punk rolled Cena back into the ring, McMahon and John Laurinaitis emerged from backstage and distracted Punk, resulting in Cena placing Punk in the STF submission hold. Punk did not submit, but McMahon signaled the referee to award Cena the match and sent Laurinaitis to ring the bell. This was reminiscent of the Montreal Screwjob in 1997, where a conspiracy orchestrated by McMahon led to Bret Hart losing his WWF Championship to Shawn Michaels by submission despite Hart never submitting.

Not wanting a tainted victory, Cena broke the hold and attacked Laurinaitis. As Cena returned to the ring, Punk performed a Go To Sleep on Cena and pinned him to win the WWE Championship. McMahon ordered the winner of the Raw Money in the Bank match, Alberto Del Rio, to cash in his contract on Punk. When Del Rio ran out and tried to cash in his contract for an immediate WWE Championship match, Punk performed a roundhouse kick on Del Rio before he could do so. After blowing a kiss to a distraught McMahon, Punk fled the arena and left as WWE Champion.

== Reception ==
During the event, WWE announced that its attendance was 14,815. It was later reported that 12,000 attendees had paid, earning WWE $750,000. The event drew 195,000 pay-per-view purchases, which was an increase of 18.2% from the 165,000 of the previous year's event. This contributed to WWE's PPV revenue of $15.8 million for the third quarter of 2011 compared with $13.6 million for the third quarter of 2010. The 2012 Money in the Bank event received 188,000 purchases, a drop of 3.6%.

Money in the Bank received positive reviews from critics. Dave Meltzer of the Wrestling Observer Newsletter awarded the Cena–Punk main event five stars out of five, the first WWE match since 1997 to receive such a rating. It was the first match in any promotion in over five years to receive the full five stars, and is the first of ten "main roster" (excluding NXT and NXT UK) matches to receive five stars in the 21st century, with the second occurring nearly 11 years later, the third achieved a few months after the second, the fourth and fifth happening at the following WrestleMania, the sixth accomplished over a year later at Backlash, the seventh occurred at Bad Blood in a Hell in a Cell match also involving CM Punk, the eighth happening at WrestleMania 41, the ninth achieved five days after the eighth on an episode of SmackDown, and the tenth taking place at SummerSlam a few months later in a Street Fight for the Undisputed WWE Championship also involving then champion John Cena, tenth occurred at WrestleMania 42 for the World Heavyweight Championship also involving then champion CM Punk, eleventh occurred at Noches de Los Grandes night 1, which produced by Lucha Libre AAA Worldwide (AAA), in partnership with its parent company WWE. The Wrestling Observer Newsletter later awarded the event the Best Major Show of 2011, over other professional wrestling events by companies including Pro Wrestling Guerrilla and New Japan Pro-Wrestling, as well as over a kickboxing event by K-1 and mixed martial arts events by Ultimate Fighting Championship. The main event won the Observer award for Match of the Year.

Alex Roberts of the Pro Wrestling Torch Newsletter attended the event. He criticized the ladder matches as "dangerous spectacles" where many wrestlers "took plenty of painful-looking bumps" but often failed to score "a corresponding crowd reaction". He also stated that the apparent injuries suffered by Sin Cara and the Miz in those matches had unnerved the audience. In contrast, Roberts felt that the two world title matches, which focused on "in-ring psychology and storytelling", were much more "memorable" or even "legendary". Regarding the main event, Roberts said, "even a match-ending run-in bypassed the expected convoluted machinations and played perfectly to the narrative at hand". At the end of 2011, Nathan Kyght of the Pro Wrestling Torch Newsletter ranked Money in the Bank the best of 34 pay-per-views in 2011, including those from WWE, Total Nonstop Action Wrestling, Ring of Honor, and Dragon Gate USA.

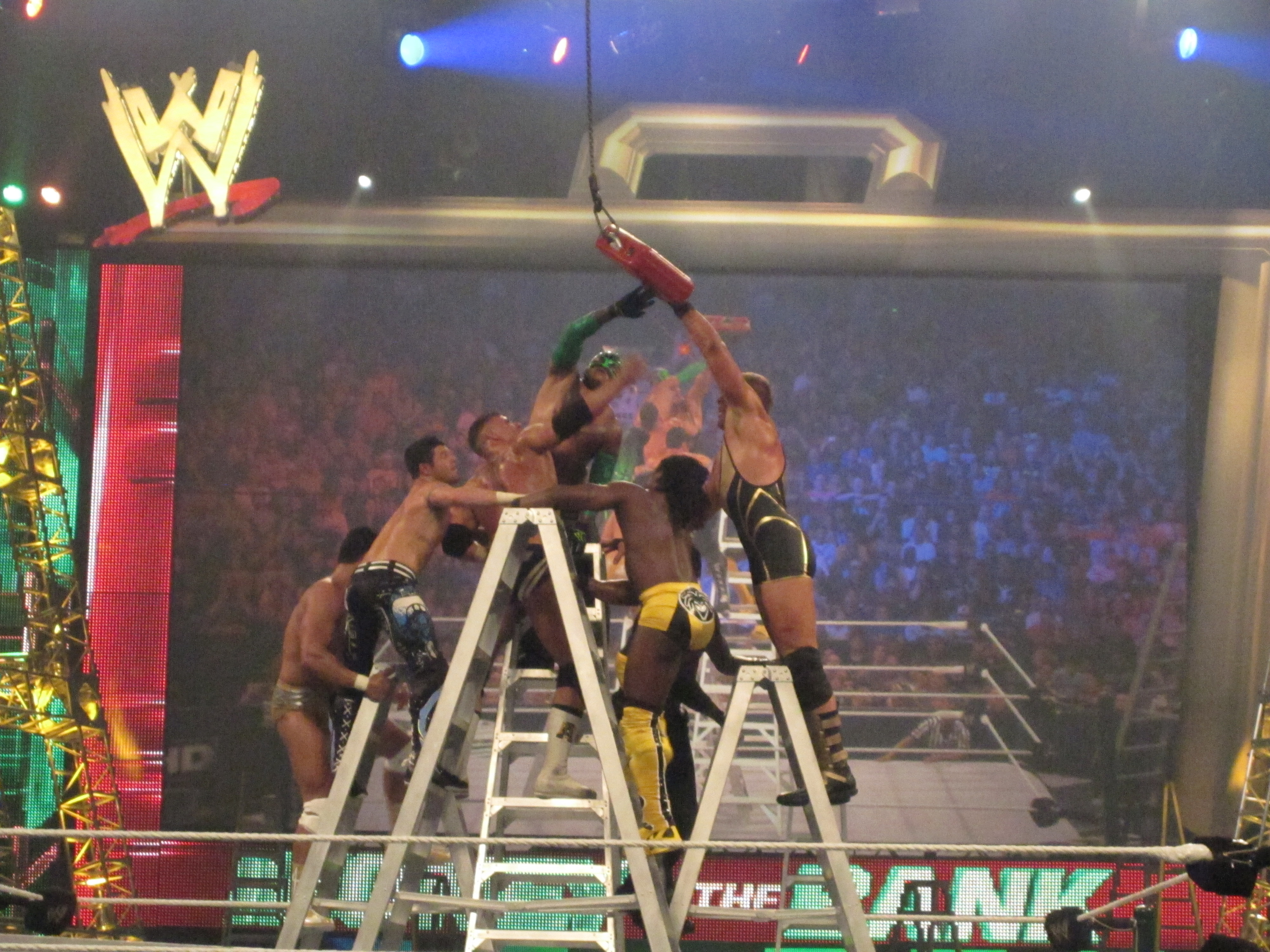
Several wrestlers jostle on top of the ladders while trying to unhook the briefcase during Raw's Money in the Bank ladder match

Wade Keller, also from the Pro Wrestling Torch Newsletter, awarded the Cena–Punk bout five stars out of five, and said the "athleticism wasn't at the A+ level, but everything else that equals magic in pro wrestling happened in the last 40 minutes". Keller awarded the SmackDown Money in the Bank ladder match four stars and said there were "lots of good workers taking a lot of big bumps, but also selling them, during the course of the match". For the Orton–Christian match, Keller said that it was "paced well, executed well, and the finish played into the personalities and storyline of this feud". Regarding the outcome of the Henry–Big Show match, Keller commented that it was "interesting to see WWE really truly get behind Henry for the first time after all of this time".

Dave Hillhouse at the Canadian Online Explorer's said Money in the Bank featured "exactly what a main event is supposed to be. A match that overshadows every other bout on the card, that has you, no matter how good each other contest is, looking forward to an ending just to be one step closer to the final contest." Hillhouse rated the main event eight out of ten and the overall event six out of ten. When the Canadian Online Explorer polled its readers on the event, 26% did not watch the event, 5% thought it was disappointing, 6% thought it was okay and 63% thought it was great.

In 2013, WWE released a list of their "15 best pay-per-views ever", with 2011's Money in the Bank ranked the second best. WWE also released "the 50 greatest WWE Championship Matches ever" in 2013, with the Cena–Punk match from the event ranked fourth. In 2019, Troy L. Smith of cleveland.com released a list of the "50 greatest wrestling pay-per-views of all time" from every professional wrestling promotion in the world, with 2011's Money in the Bank ranked at number four.

Money in the Bank 2011 was released on DVD by WWE Home Video on August 16, 2011; it included Matt Striker interviewing Daniel Bryan as extra content. DVD Talk gave a "Highly Recommended" rating to the DVD, despite "an average technical presentation (no Blu-ray option, either) and no real bonus features".

== Aftermath ==
After CM Punk left the Allstate Arena with the WWE Championship belt, celebrity website TMZ pictured him showing off his newly won title belt on the streets of Chicago with Colt Cabana and Ace Steel.

=== Raw ===
To crown a new WWE Champion, WWE Chairman Vince McMahon started an eight-man tournament on the July 18 episode of Raw, which included all the participants of the Raw Money in the Bank ladder match except Evan Bourne, whose place was filled by Dolph Ziggler. The Miz and Rey Mysterio made it to the tournament finals, which McMahon postponed so he could fire John Cena as a result of the conditions imposed on the Money in the Bank match. Triple H interrupted and announced that the WWE Board of Directors had removed McMahon from power in a vote of no confidence, and that Triple H was to take over the day-to-day operations of WWE. Before leaving, Triple H refused to fire Cena.

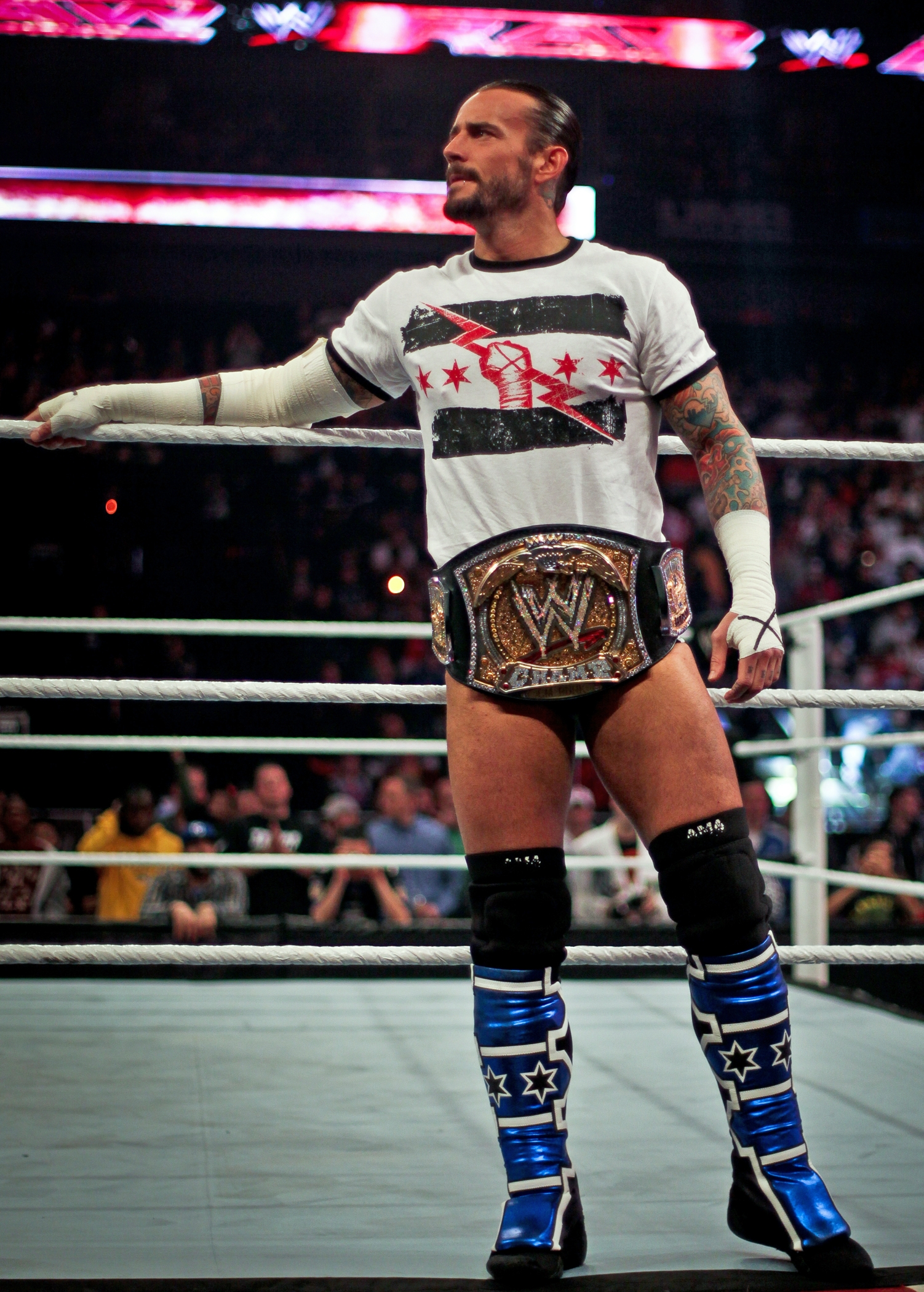
CM Punk made his return with his WWE Championship belt two weeks after Money in the Bank

On July 21, Punk gatecrashed the joint WWE–Mattel panel at San Diego Comic-Con with title belt in hand. He confronted Triple H and took exception to WWE attempting to crown a new WWE Champion. Two days later, Punk made a surprise appearance at a show hosted by the All American Wrestling company without his title belt to endorse Gregory Iron, a wrestler with cerebral palsy, as an inspiration for overcoming his impediment.

On the July 25 episode of Raw, Mysterio won the tournament to become the new WWE Champion, and immediately had to fend off Alberto Del Rio to prevent him from cashing in his Money in the Bank. Triple H, now Chief Operating Officer, decreed that Mysterio was to face ex-champion Cena later that night for the title; Cena won and again became WWE Champion. After the match, Punk made an unannounced return to WWE with the old WWE Championship belt to confront Cena, resulting in a situation where two wrestlers claimed the rights to the championship. Cena and Punk later fought in a match at SummerSlam on August 14 to crown the undisputed WWE Champion, which Punk won controversially. As Punk celebrated, Kevin Nash made his WWE return and assaulted him. Del Rio then cashed in his Money in the Bank contract and pinned Punk to become the new champion after kicking Punk in the head. Punk regained the WWE Championship from Del Rio at Survivor Series in November 2011; starting a 434-day reign until The Rock beat him at the 2013 Royal Rumble event.

John Laurinaitis continued to appear on television after Money in the Bank. In October 2011, he was appointed Raw General Manager, replacing Triple H as the on-screen authority figure. During Laurinaitis' rule, he feuded with CM Punk and later with John Cena, until he was fired in the storyline at No Way Out in June 2012.

=== SmackDown ===
After losing the World Heavyweight Championship to Christian, Randy Orton was granted a rematch at SummerSlam, where he won a No Holds Barred match to win the title. Meanwhile, in the storyline, Mark Henry went on to crush Kane and Vladimir Kozlov's ankles with steel chairs. He defeated Orton at Night of Champions in September to become World Heavyweight Champion for the first time. Big Show returned from injury in October 2011 to feud with Henry over his title. Daniel Bryan initially declared that he would only cash in his Money in the Bank contract for a World Heavyweight Championship match at WrestleMania XXVIII. However, on the November 25 episode of SmackDown, Bryan cashed in the briefcase after Henry had been knocked out by Big Show to become the World Heavyweight Champion. The match was voided by General Manager Theodore Long as Henry was not medically cleared to compete, and the briefcase was returned to Bryan. At WWE's TLC: Tables, Ladders, and Chairs PPV in December 2011, Henry lost the World Heavyweight Championship to Big Show. After the match, Henry assaulted Big Show which allowed Bryan to cash in his contract and pin Big Show to win the title. Bryan held on to his title long enough to have a World Heavyweight Championship match at WrestleMania XXVIII in April 2012, where he lost his championship to Sheamus in 18 seconds.

=== Future ===
In WWE's documentary CM Punk: Best in the World released in 2012, it was documented from the out-of-universe perspective that a disenchanted Punk rejected signing a new contract with WWE for more than a year leading up to Money in the Bank. After being persuaded by Joey Mercury and Lars Frederiksen that he could only help wrestlers underappreciated by WWE (like himself) if he stayed, Punk signed a new contract with WWE about an hour before capturing the WWE Championship from Cena, while the pay-per-view event was ongoing.

This was the final Money in the Bank held during the first brand extension, which ended in August, but was reinstated in July 2016. The second brand split reintroduced brand-exclusive PPVs, with the 2017 event held exclusively for SmackDown. However, following WrestleMania 34 in 2018, brand-exclusive PPVs were discontinued, thus the events since have featured wrestlers from both brands.

== Results ==
| No. | Results | Stipulations | Times |
|---|---|---|---|
| 1^{D} | Santino Marella and Vladimir Kozlov defeated The New Nexus (David Otunga and Michael McGillicutty) | Tag team match | — |
| 2 | Daniel Bryan defeated Wade Barrett, Cody Rhodes, Heath Slater, Justin Gabriel, Kane, Sin Cara, and Sheamus | SmackDown Money in the Bank ladder match for a World Heavyweight Championship match contract | 24:27 |
| 3 | Kelly Kelly (c) (with Eve Torres) defeated Brie Bella (with Nikki Bella) by pinfall | Singles match for the WWE Divas Championship | 4:54 |
| 4 | Mark Henry defeated Big Show by pinfall | Singles match | 6:00 |
| 5 | Alberto Del Rio defeated Rey Mysterio, Alex Riley, Evan Bourne, Jack Swagger, Kofi Kingston, The Miz, and R-Truth | Raw Money in the Bank ladder match for a WWE Championship match contract | 15:54 |
| 6 | Christian defeated Randy Orton (c) by disqualification | Singles match for the World Heavyweight Championship; Since Orton was disqualified, he lost the title. Had the referee officiated poorly, Orton would also have lost the title. | 12:20 |
| 7 | CM Punk defeated John Cena (c) by pinfall | Singles match for the WWE Championship; Since Cena lost the title, he was "fired". | 33:44 |
(c) / – the champion(s) heading into the match; D / – this was a dark match
