= Money in the Bank (2017) =

WWE pay-per-view and livestreaming event

- Promotional poster featuring The New Day (Xavier Woods, Big E, and Kofi Kingston), parodying the movie The Wizard of Oz
- Promotion: WWE
- Brand: SmackDown
- Date: June 18, 2017
- City: St. Louis, Missouri
- Venue: Scottrade Center
- Attendance: 15,392
- Tagline: A Golden Opportunity Awaits

WWE event chronology
← Previous; Extreme Rules	Next → Great Balls of Fire

Money in the Bank chronology
← Previous; 2016	Next → 2018

The 2017 Money in the Bank was a professional wrestling pay-per-view (PPV) and livestreaming event produced by WWE, held exclusively for wrestlers from the promotion's main roster brand, SmackDown. It was the eighth annual Money in the Bank event and took place on June 18, 2017, at the Scottrade Center in St. Louis, Missouri. The event centered on the Money in the Bank ladder match, a multi-person ladder match where the wrestlers compete to retrieve a briefcase hanging above the ring which contains a contract for a guaranteed world championship match at any time within the next year.

Seven matches were contested at the event, including one on the Kickoff pre-show. For the first time since 2013, there were two Money in the Bank ladder matches on the main card, including the first-ever women's version, and it is now standard for the event to include both a men's and women's version of the match. In the main event, Baron Corbin won the men's ladder match, earning a contract for a WWE Championship match, while in the opening bout, the first-ever women's version was controversially won by Carmella for a SmackDown Women's Championship match contract. In another prominent match, Jinder Mahal defeated Randy Orton to retain the WWE Championship. The event was also notable for the return of Maria Kanellis, who had last performed in WWE in December 2009, and the WWE debut of her husband, Mike Kanellis.

This was the first Money in the Bank event held since the reintroduction of the brand extension in July 2016. This was also the only to be brand-exclusive for either brand split period. The first two events in 2010 and 2011 had featured wrestlers from both Raw and SmackDown as brand-exclusive PPV events during the first brand split were discontinued in April 2007, and then the first brand split ended in August 2011. The 2018 event was originally planned to have been the only monthly event outside of the "Big Four" (Royal Rumble, WrestleMania, SummerSlam, and Survivor Series) that year to feature both brands, but following WrestleMania 34 in April that year, WWE discontinued brand-exclusive PPV and livestreaming events for the main roster.

== Production ==
=== Background ===
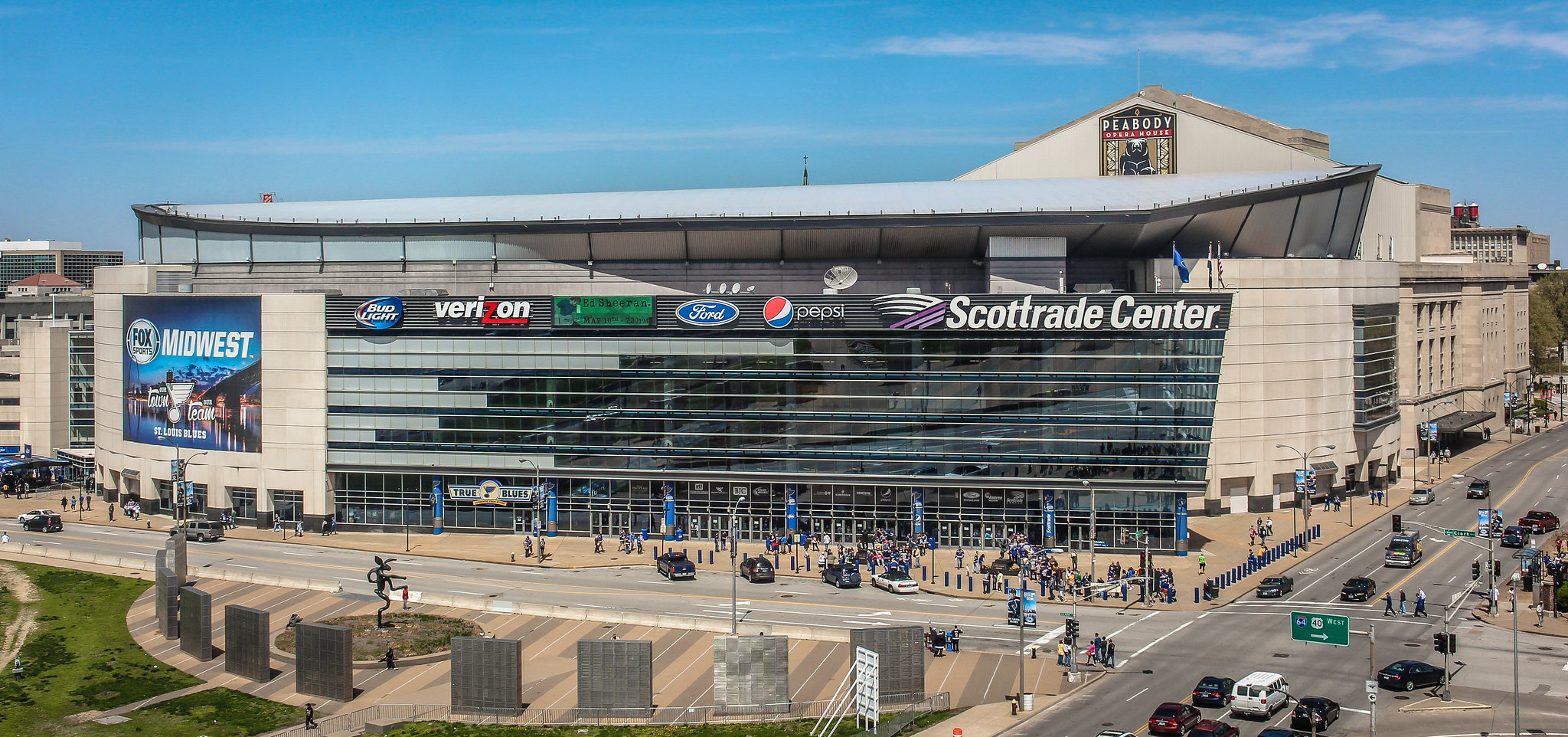
The eighth annual Money in the Bank event was held at the Scottrade Center in St. Louis, Missouri.

Money in the Bank is an annual professional wrestling event produced by WWE since 2010, which at the time was generally held between June and July. It was originally broadcast exclusively via pay-per-view (PPV) before it began simultaneously livestreaming on the WWE Network in 2014. The concept of the event comes from WWE's established Money in the Bank ladder match. Announced on December 27, 2016, the eighth Money in the Bank event was scheduled to take place on June 18, 2017, at the Scottrade Center in St. Louis, Missouri. Following the reintroduction of the brand extension in July 2016, in which WWE again divided its main roster between the Raw and SmackDown brands where wrestlers were exclusively assigned to perform, the 2017 event was held exclusively for SmackDown. Tickets went on sale on February 17 through Ticketmaster.

The Money in the Bank ladder match features multiple wrestlers using ladders to retrieve a briefcase hanging above the ring. The briefcase contains a contract that guarantees the winner a match for a world championship at any time within the next year. Since the match's inception in 2005, it was exclusively held for men. For the first time in the history of the Money in the Bank ladder match, the 2017 event featured a women's version in addition to the men's. This subsequently made this the first Money in the Bank event since 2013 to have two namesake matches. As the 2017 event was SmackDown-exclusive, the respective male and female winners received title match contracts for SmackDown's world championships at the time: the men's WWE Championship and the SmackDown Women's Championship.

=== Storylines ===
The event comprised seven matches, including one on the Kickoff pre-show, that resulted from scripted storylines. Results were predetermined by WWE's writers on the SmackDown brand, while storylines were produced on WWE's weekly television show, SmackDown Live.

At Backlash, Jinder Mahal defeated Randy Orton to win his first WWE Championship with help from The Singh Brothers (Samir and Sunil Singh). On the following episode of SmackDown, Mahal held a Punjabi style celebration, while Commissioner Shane McMahon announced that Orton invoked his championship rematch for Money in the Bank. The following week, Orton declared that he would become a 14-time world champion in his hometown at Money in the Bank before he was interrupted by Mahal on the TitanTron. The following week, after Mahal defeated Mojo Rawley, he taunted Orton, who later responded that he had received supportive phone calls from Ric Flair, Harley Race, and his father "Cowboy" Bob Orton. On the final SmackDown before Money in the Bank, Mahal with The Singh Brothers came out and berated Orton. As Orton's music played, The Singh Brothers went to the ramp to stop him, but Orton snuck up from behind Mahal and executed an RKO before retreating into the crowd.

On the May 23 episode of SmackDown, Commissioner Shane McMahon introduced AJ Styles, Shinsuke Nakamura, Dolph Ziggler, Sami Zayn, and Baron Corbin as the 2017 participants of the titular Money in the Bank ladder match. United States Champion Kevin Owens argued that he deserved to be in the match since he retained his title against Styles at Backlash. Shane agreed and added Owens to the match. Zayn then defeated Corbin in a rematch from Backlash, while Styles and Nakamura teamed up and defeated Owens and Ziggler. The following week, Owens and Corbin attacked Nakamura, who had been a guest on Owens's Highlight Reel segment, until Zayn came to the rescue. In the resulting tag team match, Nakamura and Zayn defeated Owens and Corbin. Later in the show, Ziggler defeated Styles, but lost a rematch a week later. On the same show, Corbin first attacked Zayn backstage and later assaulted Nakamura, who had just won a match against Owens. Mojo Rawley also had the opportunity to be added to the ladder match if he could defeat former rival and WWE Champion Jinder Mahal, but failed to do so. On the final SmackDown before Money in the Bank, Styles, Nakamura, and Zayn teamed up and defeated Owens, Ziggler, and Corbin. After the match, a brawl broke out between all six men that ended with Nakamura standing tall atop the ladder with the Money in the Bank briefcase.

At Backlash, The Welcoming Committee (Natalya, Carmella, and Tamina) defeated the team of Charlotte Flair, Becky Lynch, and SmackDown Women's Champion Naomi in a six-woman tag team match. On the following episode of SmackDown, Natalya asked Commissioner Shane McMahon for a SmackDown Women's Championship match, followed by Carmella, Flair, Tamina, and Lynch, who each demanded title opportunities as well. A fatal five-way elimination match, scheduled for the following week to decide who would face Naomi at Money in the Bank, ended before it could begin when all five attacked each other before the match. Shane then scheduled the first-ever Women's Money in the Bank ladder match between the five, with the winner receiving a contract for a SmackDown Women's Championship match. The following week, Lana made her first appearance since moving to the brand during the Superstar Shake-up and demanded to be added to the ladder match. Commissioner Shane McMahon refused her, saying that she would have to earn her opportunity. Lana then turned her attention to the champion and said she could beat her, but Shane again denied her and reiterated what he had previously said. Later that night, Naomi, Lynch, and Flair faced Natalya, Carmella, and Tamina in a rematch from Backlash. Lana interfered in the match, causing Naomi to be pinned by Tamina. After this, Naomi demanded a match against Lana and offered to defend her title, and Shane scheduled the match for Money in the Bank. The following week, after Naomi defeated Tamina, Lana attacked Naomi and posed with the title belt.

At Backlash, The Usos (Jey Uso and Jimmy Uso) retained the SmackDown Tag Team Championship against Breezango (Fandango and Tyler Breeze) and again in a rematch on the following episode of SmackDown. On the May 30 episode, The Usos declared that no team could defeat them. They were then interrupted by The New Day (Big E, Kofi Kingston, and Xavier Woods), making their first appearance on SmackDown since they were moved to the brand during the Superstar Shake-up. A match was then scheduled between the two teams for the title at Money in the Bank.

On the December 13, 2016, episode of SmackDown, The Hype Bros (Mojo Rawley and Zack Ryder) won a battle royal to become the number one contenders for the SmackDown Tag Team Championship, but a knee injury sustained during the match took Ryder out for an estimated six to nine months. On the June 13 episode of SmackDown, Ryder appeared backstage and was greeted by Rawley where the two declared that The Hype Bros were back. Afterwards on Talking Smack, the two said that they felt that they should still be the number one contenders for the tag titles since they won that spot, but never got to have their championship match. Three days later, the two were scheduled to face The Colóns (Primo and Epico) on the Money in the Bank Kickoff pre-show.

== Event ==
Other on-screen personnel
Role:	Name:
English commentators	Tom Phillips
English commentators	John "Bradshaw" Layfield
English commentators	Byron Saxton
Spanish commentators	Carlos Cabrera
Spanish commentators	Marcelo Rodríguez
German commentators	Tim Haber
German commentators	Calvin Knie
Ring announcer	Greg Hamilton
Referees	Danilo Anfibio
Referees	Jason Ayers
Referees	Mike Chioda
Referees	Dan Engler
Referees	Charles Robinson
Referees	Ryan Tran
Backstage interviewer	Dasha Fuentes
Pre-show panel	Renee Young
Pre-show panel	Sam Roberts
Pre-show panel	Booker T
Talking Smack panel	Renee Young
Talking Smack panel	Booker T

=== Pre-show ===
During the Money in the Bank Kickoff pre-show, The Hype Bros (Mojo Rawley and Zack Ryder) faced The Colóns (Primo Colón and Epico Colón). Ryder and Rawley executed the "Hype Ryder" on Epico to win the match.

=== Preliminary matches ===
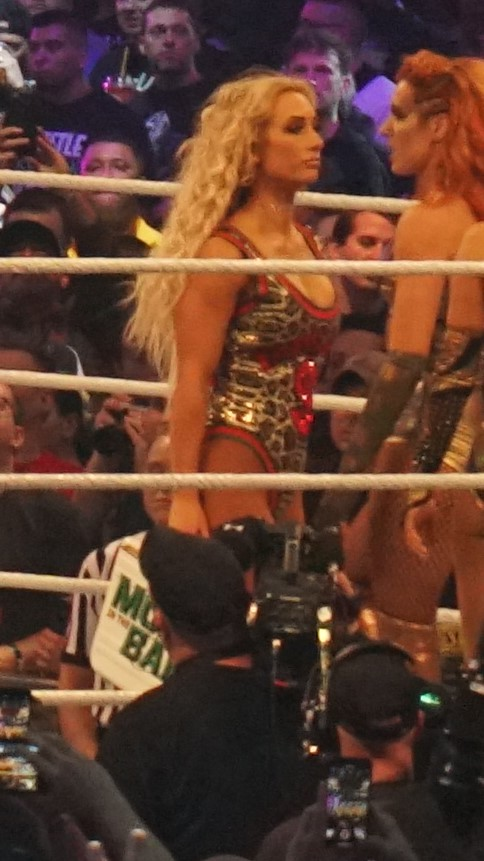
Due to Carmella controversially winning the first-ever Women's Money in the Bank ladder match, a rematch was scheduled for the June 27 episode of SmackDown with James Ellsworth banned from the arena; Carmella won the rematch by retrieving the briefcase herself and definitively earned a SmackDown Women's Championship match contract, also becoming a two-time winner in the process.

The actual pay per-view opened with the first-ever Women's Money in the Bank ladder match for a SmackDown Women's Championship match contract. In the climax, as Becky Lynch attempted to retrieve the briefcase, Carmella's manager James Ellsworth pushed the ladder over. Ellsworth retrieved the briefcase for Carmella and dropped it to her, thus Carmella won the match. Two of the three referees did not agree with the decision and General Manager Daniel Bryan said that the controversy would be dealt with on the following episode of SmackDown.

Next, The Usos (Jey Uso and Jimmy Uso) defended the SmackDown Tag Team Championship against The New Day's Big E and Kofi Kingston. In the end, Big E and Kingston performed the "Midnight Hour" on Jey. Kingston pinned Jey, only for Jimmy to pull Jey out of the ring to void the pinfall and the two were intentionally counted out. Thus, The New Day won, but The Usos retained as titles do not change hands by count out unless stipulated.

After that, Naomi defended the SmackDown Women's Championship against Lana. In the climax, Carmella came out and teased cashing in her Money in the Bank briefcase. This distracted Lana enough for Naomi to apply the "Slay-O-Mission", forcing Lana to submit. Carmella again teased cashing in her briefcase, but decided not to.

Afterwards, Maria Kanellis made her return to WWE, her last appearance being in 2010, along with her husband Mike Kanellis, who made his debut appearance for WWE. The two cut a promo about the "power of love" and shared a kiss before departing backstage.

Next, Jinder Mahal defended the WWE Championship against Randy Orton. Orton executed an "RKO" on Mahal, however, Sunil placed Mahal's foot on the rope, voiding the pinfall at a two count. The referee then evicted The Singh Brothers from ringside. Before they left, they attempted to attack WWE Hall of Famer and Orton's father, "Cowboy" Bob Orton, however Orton attacked the two, ending the attack with an "RKO" outside the ring on Sunil and an "RKO" through the announce table on Samir. After Orton returned to the ring, Mahal executed the "Khallas" on Orton to retain the title.

After that, Breezango (Fandango and Tyler Breeze) made their entrance to the ring. Earlier backstage, they received a video of two unidentifiable people who claimed credit for attacking Breeze on SmackDown. They told Breezango to come to the ring to find out who they were, which was revealed to be The Ascension (Konnor and Viktor). Breezango won the impromptu match after Fandango pinned Viktor with a small package.

=== Main event ===
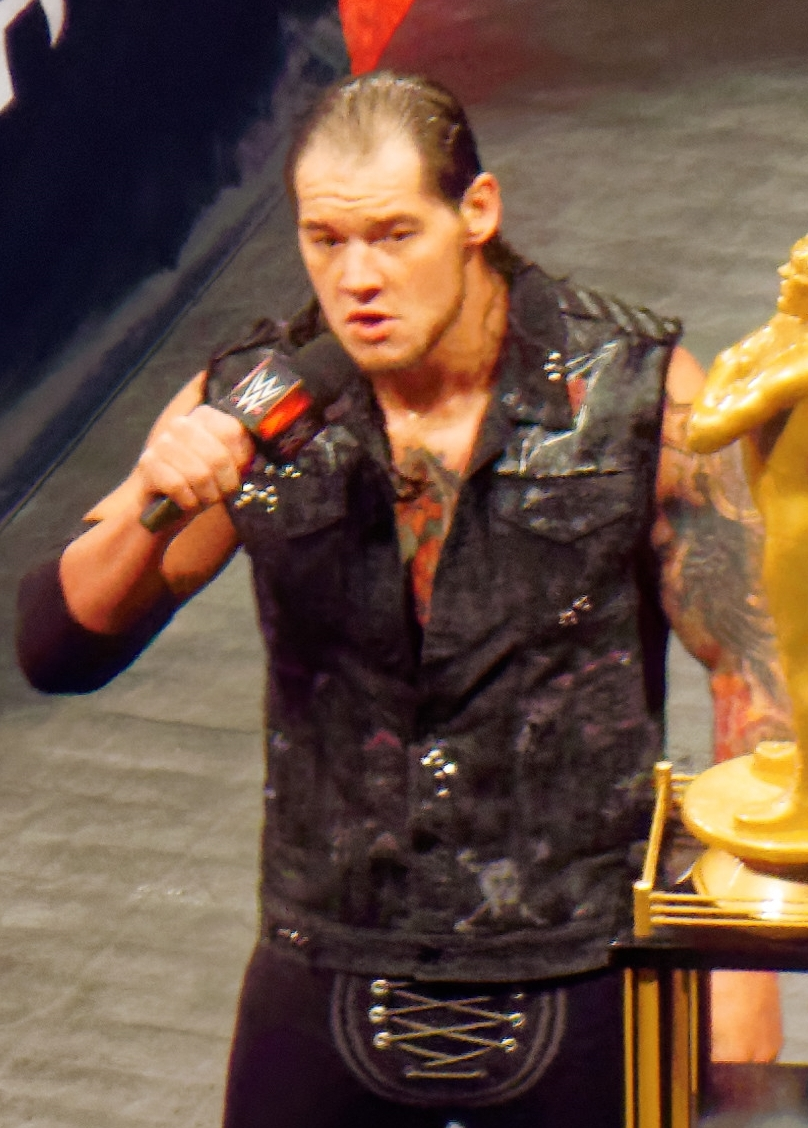
Baron Corbin, the 2017 men's Money in the Bank ladder match winner.

The main event was the men's Money in the Bank ladder match for a WWE Championship match contract, featuring Baron Corbin, Kevin Owens, Sami Zayn, AJ Styles, Shinsuke Nakamura, and Dolph Ziggler. As Nakamura made his entrance, Corbin attacked him with a ladder, taking Nakamura out for a majority of the match. In the end, after Nakamura returned, he and Styles fought at the top of the ladder. Corbin pushed the ladder over and retrieved the briefcase to win the match.

== Aftermath ==
On the following episode of SmackDown, Carmella and James Ellsworth addressed the controversy surrounding her becoming the first-ever Ms. Money in the Bank. She said that there were no rules in the match and she cited how some previous winners won with outside help. Later in the show, Daniel Bryan addressed the five participants in the ring. Noting that no one had ever won the match by having someone else retrieve the briefcase, he stripped Carmella of the briefcase and scheduled a Money in the Bank rematch for the following week, with Ellsworth banned from ringside. Before the rematch, Bryan decided to ban Ellsworth from the arena. Despite this, Ellsworth returned, but was taken out by Becky Lynch. Carmella then attacked Lynch and retrieved the briefcase to definitively become Ms. Money in the Bank. The following week, Bryan again banned Ellsworth from the arena, fined him US$10,000, suspended him for 30 days, and said that if Ellsworth were to break these rules, Carmella would be stripped of the briefcase again. Ellsworth abided by the rules, and Carmella went on to successfully cash in her briefcase on the April 10, 2018, episode of SmackDown, defeating champion Charlotte Flair, who had just been attacked by the debuting IIconics (Peyton Royce and Billie Kay). Prior to this victory, she had two unsuccessful cash-in attempts during her reign with the briefcase.

SmackDown Women's Champion Naomi said it was a disappointment that Ellsworth won the ladder match for Carmella at Money in the Bank, but she said she was ready for any challenge. Lana interrupted and wanted a rematch. Naomi, citing herself as a fighting champion, agreed to the rematch for the following week, where she quickly defeated Lana again. Lana received one more rematch on the July 4 episode, but failed to defeat Naomi.

In a sit-down interview, Randy Orton said that he lost focus when he saw that The Singh Brothers were going to attack his father. He said he was no longer concerned about becoming a fourteen-time world champion, he just wanted to hurt Jinder Mahal. Later in the show after Mahal defeated Luke Harper, Orton came out, attacked The Singh Brothers, and then Mahal, but Mahal managed to escape into the crowd. The following week, Commissioner Shane McMahon granted Orton a rematch for the title at Battleground, but allowed Mahal to choose the stipulation, and he chose a Punjabi Prison match.

United States Champion Kevin Owens felt that the other five participants of the Money in the Bank ladder match conspired against him, and that was why he did not win. He then issued a U.S. Championship open challenge to any local competitor. AJ Styles came out to accept the challenge, but Owens denied him since Styles was not from Dayton, Ohio. American Alpha's Chad Gable then answered the challenge, saying that he had moved to Dayton "[that] morning", but Owens retained in the ensuing match. Also on the show, Baron Corbin teased cashing in his Money in the Bank contract during WWE Champion Jinder Mahal's non-title match against Luke Harper, and General Manager Daniel Bryan, who praised Sami Zayn's efforts in the ladder match, scheduled Zayn to face Corbin the following week, where Corbin won. Corbin cashed in his Money in the Bank contract on the August 15 episode of SmackDown, but as soon as the match started, he attacked John Cena instead, allowing Mahal to roll him up for the victory, making Corbin the third wrestler to fail to win a title upon cash-in.

The New Day (Kofi Kingston, Big E, and Xavier Woods) addressed how The Usos (Jey Uso and Jimmy Uso) backed out of their championship match. Big E then defeated Jimmy in a singles match. Also in the tag team division, The Hype Bros convinced General Manager Daniel Bryan to give them an opportunity at the SmackDown Tag Team Championship. Bryan said that if they could defeat The Usos in a non-title match the following week, they would become the number one contenders. The Hype Bros failed to defeat The Usos, after which, The New Day challenged The Usos to another title match at Battleground and they accepted.

In the weeks following Money in the Bank, Mike and Maria Kanellis began a feud with Sami Zayn, and Mike defeated Zayn in his WWE debut match on the July 18 episode of SmackDown. A rematch was then scheduled for Battleground.

With the introduction of the women's Money in the Bank ladder match at this event, it is now standard for the annual event to include both a men's and women's version of the match. The 2017 Money in the Bank event would also be the only to be brand-exclusive for either brand split period, as the 2018 event was scheduled to be held for both Raw and SmackDown. This would have been the only monthly event outside of the "Big Four" (Royal Rumble, WrestleMania, SummerSlam, and Survivor Series) to feature both brands in 2018, but following WrestleMania 34 in April that year, WWE discontinued brand-exclusive PPV and livestreaming events for the main roster.

== Results ==
No.	Results	Stipulations	Times
1^{P}	The Hype Bros (Mojo Rawley and Zack Ryder) defeated The Colóns (Epico Colón and Primo Colón) by pinfall	Tag team match	8:30
2	Carmella (with James Ellsworth) defeated Becky Lynch, Charlotte Flair, Natalya, and Tamina	Money in the Bank ladder match for a WWE SmackDown Women's Championship match contract	13:20
3	The New Day (Big E and Kofi Kingston) (with Xavier Woods) defeated The Usos (Jey Uso and Jimmy Uso) (c) by countout	Tag team match for the WWE SmackDown Tag Team Championship	12:00
4	Naomi (c) defeated Lana by submission	Singles match for the WWE SmackDown Women's Championship	7:30
5	Jinder Mahal (c) (with The Singh Brothers) defeated Randy Orton by pinfall	Singles match for the WWE Championship	20:50
6	Breezango (Fandango and Tyler Breeze) defeated The Ascension (Konnor and Viktor) by pinfall	Tag team match	3:50
7	Baron Corbin defeated AJ Styles, Dolph Ziggler, Kevin Owens, Sami Zayn, and Shinsuke Nakamura	Money in the Bank ladder match for a WWE Championship match contract	29:45
(c) / – the champion(s) heading into the match; P / – the match was broadcast on the pre-show
