= WWE Raw 1000 =

2012 professional wrestling television special

- Promotional poster for the 1000th episode of Raw
- Promotion: WWE
- Date: July 23, 2012
- City: St. Louis, Missouri
- Venue: Scottrade Center
- Attendance: 18,318
- Tagline: The 1000th Episode of Raw

Raw special episodes chronology
← Previous; Raw Homecoming	Next → Raw 25 Years

Raw 1000 was a television special that was broadcast live on July 23, 2012, airing on USA Network (in the U.S.) as the 1000th episode of WWE's flagship show Raw. It was held at the Scottrade Center in St. Louis, Missouri.

The show featured five professional wrestling matches, a wedding ceremony and appearances from past WWE performers. The wedding between AJ Lee and Daniel Bryan ended with AJ leaving Bryan after being announced as the new General Manager of Raw by WWE chairman Vince McMahon. The Miz defeated Christian to become the WWE Intercontinental Champion. In the main event, John Cena won by disqualification in a WWE Championship match against defending champion CM Punk after cashing in his Money in the Bank contract, who proceeded to turn heel (villainous) by attacking The Rock.

The episode averaged 6 million viewers, Raw's highest viewership since June 2009. The episode also started the program's permanent three-hour format, which had been previously reserved for special episodes. The three-hour format would last for more than twelve years before ending after the show's September 30, 2024 episode.

== Production ==
=== Background ===
Raw first aired on January 11, 1993, and since became the longest-running weekly episodic program in television history with no reruns. On May 17, 2012, WWE announced that Raw would expand from its two-hour format to three hours beginning with the 1000th episode on July 23, 2012. This three-hour format will last until the September 30, 2024 episode of Raw, with all future episodes until at least December 30 going back to two hours in preparation for the show's move from the USA Network to Netflix the following year.

The event took place at the Scottrade Center in St. Louis, Missouri, and was broadcast on the USA Network in the United States. Actor Charlie Sheen served as the social media ambassador for the event and appeared throughout the show via Skype.

=== Storylines ===
Raw 1000 featured professional wrestlers performing as characters in scripted events pre-determined by the hosting promotion, WWE.

At Money in the Bank, John Cena won the Money in the Bank ladder match to earn a contract for a WWE Championship match. The following night on Raw after a match between WWE Champion CM Punk and Big Show ended in a disqualification, Cena came down to the ring and announced his intention to cash-in his contract for a championship match against Punk on Raw 1000, opting for the match to be fair between them. Cena followed up by hitting Big Show in the head with the briefcase.

In November 2011, AJ Lee and Daniel Bryan were placed in an on-screen romance. The next month, Bryan won the World Heavyweight Championship and developed heel (villainous) traits. By March 2012, Bryan started acting verbally abusive towards AJ but she stood by him. At WrestleMania XXVIII on April 1, after AJ and Bryan shared a "good luck kiss", he was surprised by Sheamus and defeated in 18 seconds. Bryan blamed AJ for his loss of the World Heavyweight Championship and ended their relationship. AJ made multiple attempts to mend their relationship but Bryan spurned her and left her distraught. As a result, AJ's character transitioned to "mentally unstable". AJ turned her affections to Bryan's rival, WWE Champion CM Punk, and WWE title contender Kane. As Bryan and Punk's feud progressed, AJ was announced as the special guest referee for their title match at Money in the Bank. Bryan made advances on AJ in an attempt to influence her, however, she focused her attention on Punk. On July 9, she proposed to Punk but Bryan countered with a proposal of his own; Punk rejected her offer and she slapped both men. At Money in the Bank on July 15, as referee, AJ counted Punk's pinfall on Bryan, resulting in a successful title defense for Punk; as Punk celebrated over a fallen Bryan, AJ was left alone. The next night, Bryan proposed to her again and she accepted.

Beginning on June 11, 2012, Heath Slater was involved in weekly segments where he would insult the celebration of past WWE wrestlers. Each week he was interrupted by a returning WWE veteran, who would either attack him or quickly defeat him in a match. This included Vader, Roddy Piper, Psycho Sid, Bob Backlund, Rikishi, and Road Warrior Animal. On July 2, Slater won his only match during this period, against Doink the Clown, but was attacked by Diamond Dallas Page afterward.

== Event ==
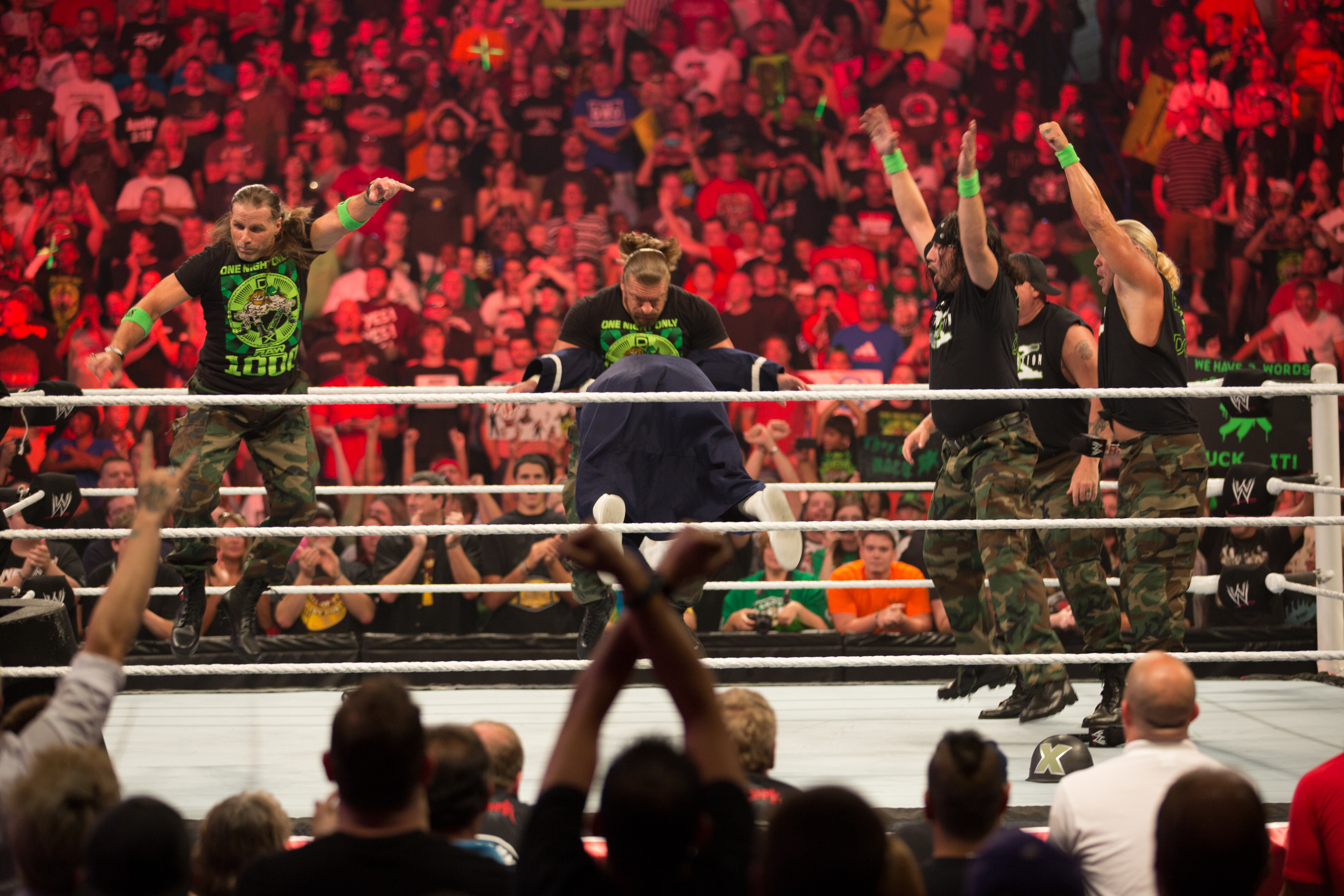
Triple H hitting the Pedigree on Damien Sandow after Sandow's interruption of the DX reunion

The show opened with a video package showcasing the history of the show. WWE chairman and chief executive officer Vince McMahon thanked the audience both live in the arena and watching at home for making the 1000th episode of Raw possible before introducing Triple H and Shawn Michaels. The two revealed the other members of D-Generation X, X-Pac, Road Dogg and Billy Gunn, aboard an army jeep (which commentator Michael Cole remarked as similar to the famous DX invasion in Norfolk back in 1998). The reunited group was interrupted by Damien Sandow, who objected to the group's crass antics. DX then attacked him with a Sweet Chin Music from Michaels, followed by a Pedigree from Triple H, and the group stripping him down to his trunks. The group then performed some of their signature taunts.

Jim Ross came out to call the opening match of the night which was a six-man tag team match pitting World Heavyweight Champion Sheamus, Rey Mysterio, and Sin Cara against Alberto Del Rio, Dolph Ziggler, and Chris Jericho. Ziggler attacked his own partner, Jericho, leading to a Brogue Kick from Sheamus for the win.

Afterwards, a backstage segment showed AJ Lee and Layla prepare for AJ's wedding. They were interrupted by Jim Duggan, Roddy Piper, R-Truth, and Mae Young and her son, the Hand.

In the next match Brodus Clay quickly defeated Jack Swagger. Afterwards, Dude Love performed his signature Mr. Socko on Swagger and danced with Clay and The Funkadactyls (Cameron and Naomi). Backstage, DX interrupted a yoga session between Trish Stratus and Triple H.

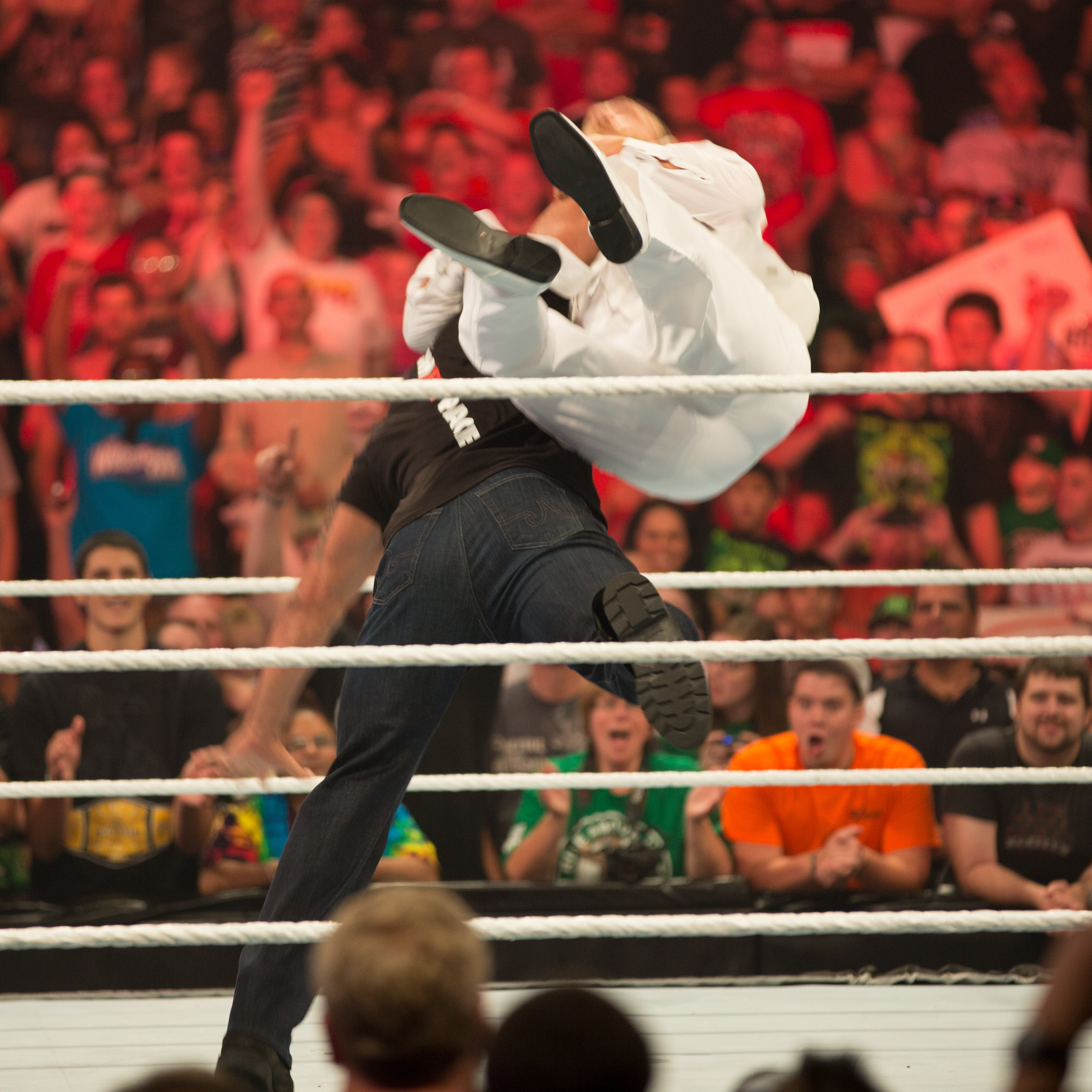
The Rock hitting Daniel Bryan with a Rock Bottom

Next Jerry Lawler introduced Reverend Slick as the minister for the wedding of AJ Lee and Daniel Bryan. Before the vows could be completed, AJ revealed that her "yes" was not directed at Bryan but at a business proposal by Vince McMahon, who made her the General Manager of Raw. Bryan stayed in the ring, venting his frustration out by destroying the wedding props and throwing them out of the ring. CM Punk came out to confront him and Bryan stated that he was the "greatest wrestler of all time" since Punk was "The Best in the World". The Rock returned to Raw, insulted Bryan and revealed that he would fight for the WWE Championship at the Royal Rumble against whoever the WWE Champion would be at that time. He then hit Bryan with a Rock Bottom.

Bret Hart came out next as guest ring announcer for an Intercontinental Championship match between champion Christian and The Miz. The Miz defeated Christian after hitting the Skull Crushing Finale. With the win, The Miz was recognized as a WWE Triple Crown winner and a Grand Slam champion.

Triple H returned to call out Brock Lesnar (who had attacked Triple H and broke his arm with the Kimura lock on the April 30, 2012 episode of Raw). Instead, Lesnar's advocate, Paul Heyman, confronted Triple H and refused the challenge for a match at SummerSlam. However, after threats by Triple H and taunting by Triple H's wife Stephanie McMahon, Heyman accepted the match on behalf of Lesnar. After Heyman repeatedly made remarks about her kids, Stephanie physically attacked him. Lesnar came out and attacked Triple H and both men engaged in a brief fight before Triple H clotheslined Lesnar out of the ring.

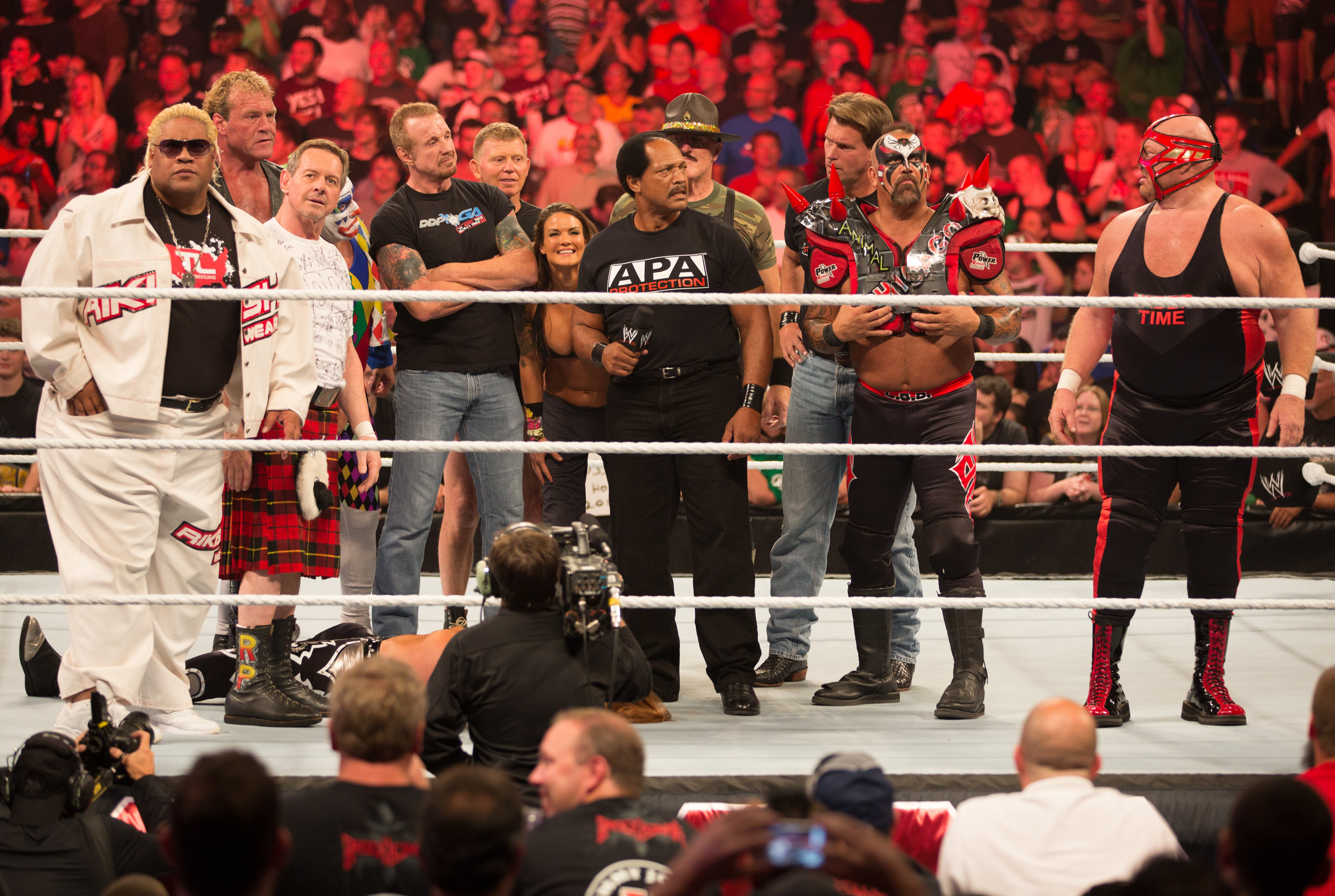
WWE's returning legends standing over Heath Slater

Santino Marella and Hornswoggle made brief appearances to hand out collectibles to young fans before Howard Finkel made a special appearance to introduce Heath Slater, who challenged any WWE legend backstage to a no-disqualification, no countout match. Lita answered the challenge and hired The APA (Bradshaw and Faarooq) for protection. As Slater tried to escape, all the veterans he had previously faced (Bob Backlund, Diamond Dallas Page, Doink the Clown, Rikishi, Road Warrior Animal, Roddy Piper, Sgt. Slaughter, Sycho Sid, and Vader) chased him back into the ring, where he was hit with a Twist of Fate from Lita, setting up a Clothesline From Hell from Bradshaw and a Litasault from Lita for the pinfall.

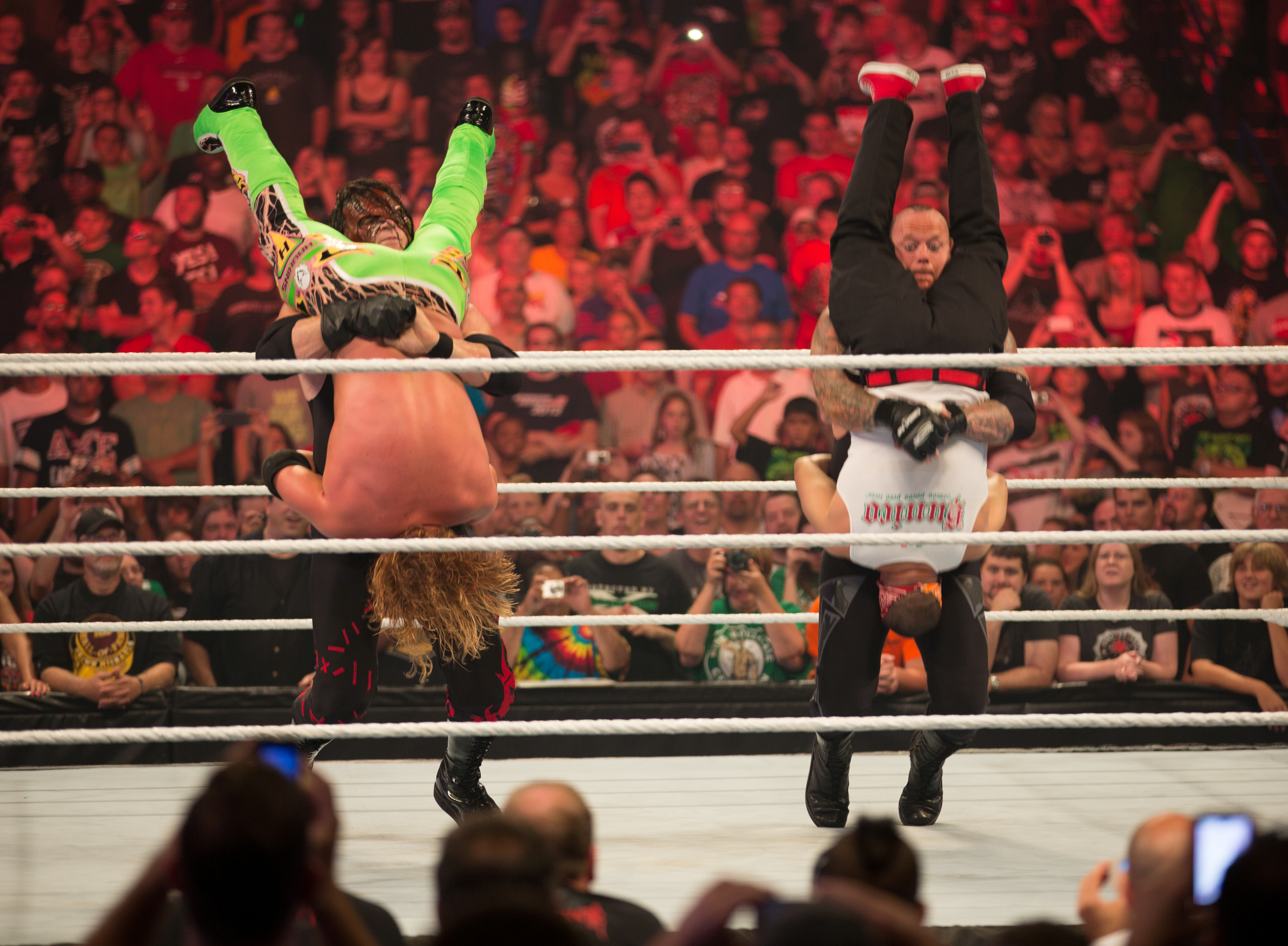
The Brothers of Destruction deliver simultaneous Tombstone Piledrivers to Curt Hawkins and Hunico

Kane was then scheduled to face Jinder Mahal in a match, but Curt Hawkins, Tyler Reks, Hunico, Camacho, and Drew McIntyre came out and tried to attack him to vent out their anger at being overlooked by WWE. The Undertaker then made his first appearance since WrestleMania XXVIII and, alongside Kane, fended off Mahal and his cohorts, punctuated with double Chokeslams and Tombstones.

The main event featured John Cena against CM Punk, with Cena cashing in his Money in the Bank contract for a shot at Punk's WWE Championship. After what had been an even match up, Punk and the referee collided, knocking the referee unconscious to the ground. Big Show came down to the ring and hit Cena with the Knockout Punch. Punk helped the referee back into the ring and – after a moment's hesitation – pinned a seemingly knocked out Cena, but Cena kicked out. Cena then reversed Punk's attempted Go to Sleep into the STF submission. Big Show again interfered and attacked Cena, resulting in a disqualification victory for Cena (Punk retained the title as the championship could only change hands by pinfall or submission). The Rock ran down to save Cena and attacked Big Show; while setting up his signature People's Elbow maneuver, Punk re-entered the ring and attacked The Rock. Punk then performed the Go to Sleep move on The Rock, turning him heel (villainous).

== Reception ==
The episode received a 3.9 Nielsen rating and averaged 6 million viewers, up 18% from the previous week's 4.9 million viewers. It was the first time Raw had surpassed the six million viewer mark since June 2009. It also became the most watched three-hour Raw in history and was the most watched program on cable television that night.

== Aftermath ==
AJ Lee's role as the on-screen General Manager of Raw began the next week, on July 30. She alleged that Daniel Bryan only wanted the legal leverage to have her committed and forced him to undergo his own psychological evaluation. AJ continued to exact revenge on both Bryan and CM Punk throughout her tenure, denying their requests and booking them in matches against their wishes. AJ stepped down from her General Manager duties on October 22, when she became embroiled in a scandal storyline with John Cena.

CM Punk's reign as WWE Champion continued for the remainder of the year. He allied with Paul Heyman and defended his championship against John Cena and Big Show at SummerSlam, Cena at Night of Champions, Ryback at Hell in a Cell, and Cena and Ryback at Survivor Series. On December 5, Punk became the longest-reigning WWE Champion in the past 25 years, surpassing John Cena's 380-day reign. In January 2013, Punk and The Rock continued their rivalry after their confrontation at Raw 1000. At the Royal Rumble on January 27, 2013, The Rock defeated Punk for the WWE Championship, ending Punk's reign at 434 days.

Bradshaw would return to the commentary team under the John "Bradshaw" Layfield gimmick.

== Results ==
No.	Results	Stipulations	Times
1	Rey Mysterio, Sheamus and Sin Cara defeated Alberto Del Rio, Chris Jericho and Dolph Ziggler (with Vickie Guerrero and Ricardo Rodriguez)	Six-man tag team match	4:18
2	Brodus Clay (with Dude Love, Cameron and Naomi) defeated Jack Swagger	Singles match	0:16
3	The Miz defeated Christian (c)	Singles match for the WWE Intercontinental Championship	7:38
4	Lita (with Bradshaw and Faarooq) defeated Heath Slater	No Disqualification match	1:55
5	John Cena defeated CM Punk (c) by disqualification	Singles match for the WWE Championship; This was Cena's Money in the Bank cash-in match	11:14
(c) / – the champion(s) heading into the match

== See also ==
- List of WWE Raw special episodes
