= Money in the Bank (2012) =

WWE pay-per-view event

- Promotional poster featuring Alberto Del Rio in a style of a magazine cover
- Promotion: WWE
- Date: July 15, 2012
- City: Phoenix, Arizona
- Venue: US Airways Center
- Attendance: 9,000
- Buy rate: 206,000

Pay-per-view chronology
← Previous; No Way Out	Next → SummerSlam

Money in the Bank chronology
← Previous; 2011	Next → 2013

The 2012 Money in the Bank was a professional wrestling pay-per-view (PPV) event produced by WWE. It was the third annual Money in the Bank event and took place on July 15, 2012, at the US Airways Center in Phoenix, Arizona. The event centered on the men's Money in the Bank ladder match, a multi-person ladder match where the wrestlers compete to retrieve a briefcase hanging above the ring which contains a contract for a guaranteed world championship match at any time within the next year.

Eight matches were contested at the event, with one match on the pre-show. Two Money in the Bank ladder matches were held, one of which was the main event where John Cena won to earn a WWE Championship match contract. The other ladder match opened the show and saw Dolph Ziggler win to secure a World Heavyweight Championship match contract. In other prominent matches, Sheamus defeated Alberto Del Rio to retain the World Heavyweight Championship and CM Punk defeated Daniel Bryan to retain the WWE Championship in a no disqualification match with AJ Lee as the special guest referee.

The event had 188,000 pay-per-view buys, slightly down on the previous year's figure of 195,000 buys. This was the first Money in the Bank event held following the discontinuation of the first brand extension in August 2011.

== Production ==
=== Background ===
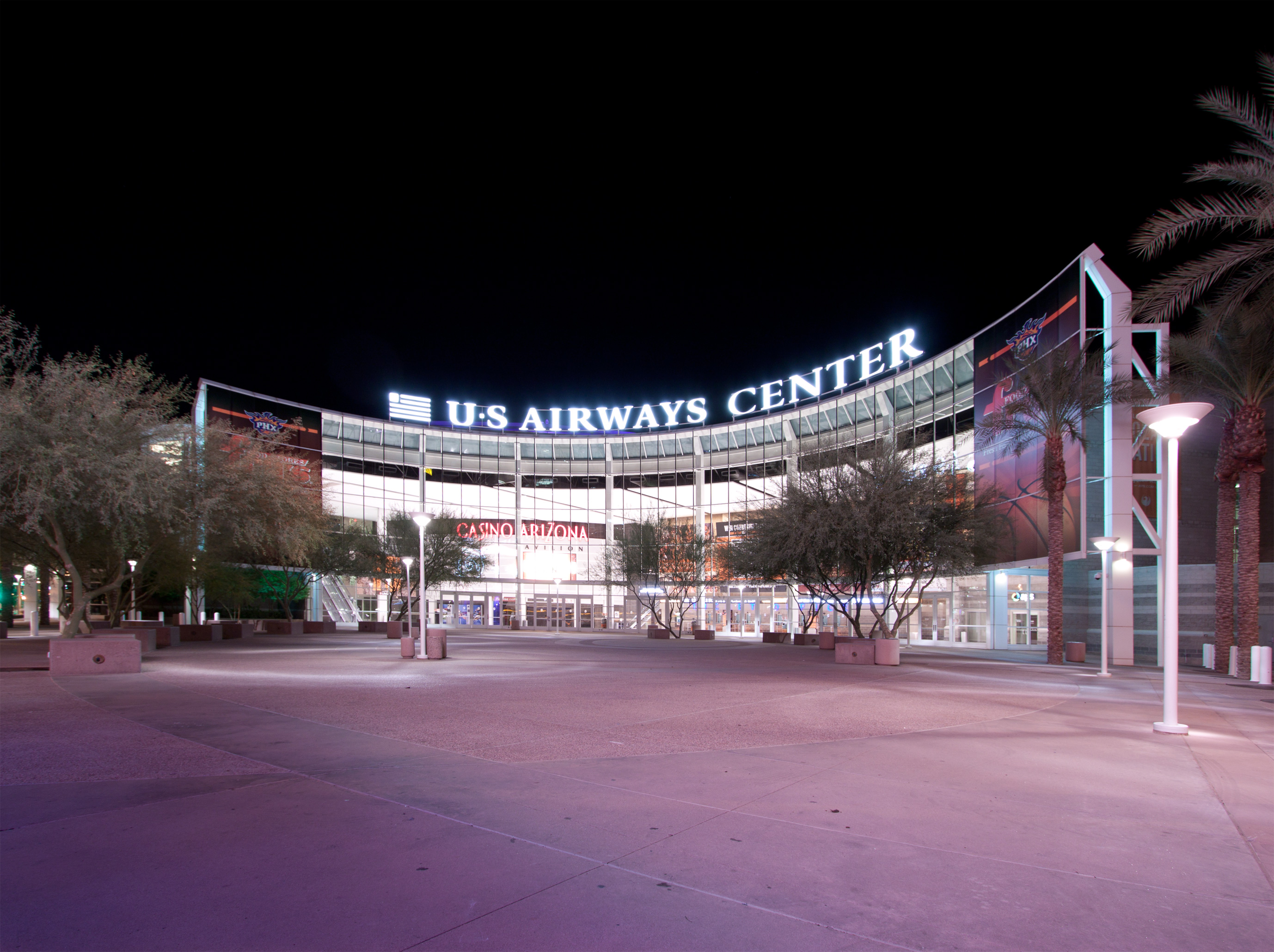
The third annual Money in the Bank event was held at the US Airways Center in Phoenix, Arizona.

Money in the Bank is an annual professional wrestling pay-per-view (PPV) event produced by WWE since 2010, which at the time was held in July. The concept of the event comes from WWE's established Money in the Bank ladder match, in which multiple wrestlers use ladders to retrieve a briefcase hanging above the ring. The briefcase contains a contract that guarantees the winner a match for a world championship at any time within the next year. The third Money in the Bank event was scheduled to be held on July 15, 2012, at the US Airways Center in Phoenix, Arizona.

This was the first Money in the Bank event held since the end of the first brand split in August 2011. As the prior two events were held under the first brand extension, there were two Money in the Bank ladder matches, one for each brand, with Raw's ladder match granting a WWE Championship match contract, while SmackDown's granted a World Heavyweight Championship match contract. The 2012 event continued to have two ladder matches with the same respective rewards but were no longer brand-exclusive.

=== Storylines ===
Money in the Bank featured seven professional wrestling matches that involved different wrestlers from pre-existing feuds or and storylines that played out on WWE's weekly television shows, Raw and SmackDown.

On the June 25 episode of Raw, Vickie Guerrero announced that only previous WWE Champions may participate in the Money in the Bank ladder match for the WWE Championship match contract. The four participants announced were Kane, Chris Jericho, Big Show, and John Cena. Earlier, during the pay-per-view, The Miz would return from filming The Marine 3: Homefront and announced that he would insert himself in the match.

On the June 29 episode of SmackDown, qualifying matches were held for the Money in the Bank ladder match for the World Heavyweight Championship match contract. In those matches, Damien Sandow defeated Zack Ryder, Tyson Kidd defeated Jack Swagger, Santino Marella and Christian defeated Cody Rhodes and David Otunga in a tag team match, and Tensai defeated Justin Gabriel. On the July 3 "Great American Bash" edition of SmackDown, Rhodes defeated Christian and Dolph Ziggler defeated Alex Riley in two additional qualifying matches. The final qualifying match took place on the July 9 episode of Raw in which Sin Cara defeated Heath Slater.

In addition, there was a rivalry involving CM Punk and Daniel Bryan for Punk's WWE Championship. In his reign as WWE Champion, he had successfully defended his title against several contenders, and had defeated Bryan in several pay-per-views, the last one also involving Kane. At the same time, Bryan's ex-girlfriend AJ had taken a liking towards Punk and Kane and had also rekindled her interest in Bryan, but Punk and Kane believed that she was unstable due to Bryan breaking up with AJ. Following No Way Out, Bryan defeated Punk and Kane to earn his rematch against Punk at Money in the Bank. Weeks later, AJ was named special guest referee. Right before the pay-per-view began, WWE.com posted that the no disqualification stipulation was added.

== Event ==
Other on-screen personnel
Role:	Name:
English Commentators	Michael Cole
English Commentators	Jerry Lawler
English Commentators	Booker T
Spanish Commentators	Carlos Cabrera
Spanish Commentators	Marcelo Rodriguez
Backstage interviewer	Josh Mathews
Backstage interviewer	Matt Striker
Ring announcers	Lilian Garcia
Ring announcers	Justin Roberts
Referees	Mike Chioda
Referees	Rod Zapata
Referees	John Cone
Referees	Marc Harris
Referees	AJ Lee (Punk vs. Bryan)
Referees	Chad Patton

=== Pre-show ===
On the pre-show, WWE Tag Team Champions Kofi Kingston and R-Truth faced Camacho and Hunico in a non-title match. In the end, Kingston performed Trouble in Paradise on Hunico and R-Truth performed Little Jimmy on Camacho to win the match.

=== Preliminary matches ===
The actual pay-per-view opened with the Money in the Bank ladder match for a World Heavyweight Championship contract involving Damien Sandow, Tensai, Intercontinental Champion Christian, United States Champion Santino Marella, Tyson Kidd, Dolph Ziggler, Cody Rhodes, and Sin Cara. In the end, Christian attempted to retrieve the briefcase, but Ziggler struck Christian with a ladder, causing Christian to fall off the ladder, and retrieved the briefcase.

Then, The Miz returned and announced his entry in the WWE Championship Money in the Bank ladder match.

Next, Sheamus defended the World Heavyweight Championship against Alberto Del Rio. During the match, Del Rio repeatedly targeted Sheamus' left shoulder after Sheamus collided with the ring post. In the end, Sheamus was able to execute White Noise and a Brogue Kick to retain the title. After the match, Del Rio and his ring announcer Ricardo Rodriguez attacked Sheamus. Dolph Ziggler, who won the Money In The Bank earlier that night, attempted to cash it in until a distraction by Del Rio. Sheamus would give Ziggler a Brogue Kick and leave with the World Heavyweight Championship, as the match never got started.

After that, The Prime Time Players (Darren Young and Titus O'Neil) faced Primo & Epico. WWE Tag Team Champions Kofi Kingston and R-Truth were at ringside providing commentary for the match. Primo pinned Young with a roll up for the win.

In the fourth match, CM Punk defended the WWE Championship against Daniel Bryan in a no disqualification match with AJ serving as the special guest referee. During the match, Punk accidentally knocked AJ down. Bryan took advantage of the situation and made it appear that he was concerned about her health when she was escorted to the back of the arena. While AJ was away, Bryan targeted Punk's ribs using a kendo stick. Punk attempted a Go To Sleep twice, but Bryan countered each time. Bryan applied a surfboard, but Punk escaped by striking Bryan with the kendo stick. AJ returned to the ring and made the second referee return backstage. She brought a chair into the ring, which Bryan struck Punk with for several near-falls. Bryan tried to coax AJ, allowing Punk to roll him up for a near-fall. Punk set the chair up in the corner and before he could send Bryan into the chair, AJ stood in the way, allowing Bryan to gain the advantage. However, as Bryan went to retrieve the kendo stick, she stood on it, allowing Punk to execute a scoop slam with the chair. Punk attempted a diving elbow drop with the chair, but missed and fell on the chair. Bryan applied the Yes Lock using the kendo stick but Punk fought out and performed a GTS for a near-fall. Punk executed a back superplex through a table on Bryan to retain the title.

Later, Ryback faced Curt Hawkins and Tyler Reks in a handicap match. Ryback executed Shell Shocked on Reks to win the match.

After that, Layla, Kaitlyn, and Tamina Snuka faced Beth Phoenix, Natalya, and Eve in a six-diva tag team match. When the referee lost control of the match, Tamina performed a superkick on Phoenix. Layla performed The Layout on Phoenix for the victory.

=== Main event ===
The main event was the Money in the Bank ladder match for a WWE Championship contract involving John Cena, Big Show, Chris Jericho, Kane, and The Miz. Cena performed an Attitude Adjustment on Big Show through a broadcast table and then the other wrestlers buried Big Show under several ladders. Cena performed an Attitude Adjustment on Kane on top of The Miz, who was lying on a ladder, but Jericho struck Cena with a ladder. As Jericho was about to retrieve the briefcase, Big Show destroyed the ladder with one hand. Big Show destroyed every ladder in the ring and then retrieved a super-sized ladder. Kane and Big Show fought atop the ladder, but Big Show knocked Kane and Cena off of the ladder. Jericho struck Big Show with a chair, causing Big Show to fall. Jericho applied a sleeper hold to Cena atop the ladder. After Cena fell, Jericho almost retrieved the briefcase, but The Miz climbed the other side of the ladder. Big Show climbed up the ladder and attacked Jericho and The Miz with KO Punches. Big Show attempted a KO Punch on Cena, but Cena blocked it with the briefcase and struck Big Show with it. During this, the handle of the briefcase broke off, meaning Cena won the match. Cena then knocked Big Show off the ladder.

== Reception ==
Money in the Bank received generally positive reviews. Adam Testa of The Baltimore Sun called the pay-per-view "Strong, if unspectacular"; they praised the WWE title match calling it a "fun ride" and that "The no disqualification stipulation really added to the contest". Both Money in the Bank matches were well received. Colin Rinehart of 411Mania awarded the pay-per-view a 7.8/10 calling it 'good'. The WWE title match received 4.25 stars, the World Heavyweight Championship Money in the Bank ladder match received 4 stars, and the WWE Championship Money in the Bank ladder match received 3.75 stars, according to Dave Meltzer.

== Aftermath ==
On July 23, 2012, during Raw 1000, John Cena cashed in his Money in the Bank on CM Punk by having a singles match with him, becoming only the second wrestler (Rob Van Dam being the first) to announce his intention prior to cashing in. Cena won the match via disqualification thus not winning the title after Big Show interfered. This made John Cena the first of six wrestlers (as of 2026) to officially cash in the contract and not win the championship, the others being Damien Sandow in October 2013, Baron Corbin in August 2017, Braun Strowman in September 2018, Austin Theory in November 2022, and Drew McIntyre in July 2024. (In Theory's case, he was the first person to cash in the contract on a non-world title, that being the United States Championship.)

Meanwhile, Dolph Ziggler attempted various times to cash in the contract following Money in the Bank including four times on SmackDown against Sheamus and Big Show when they were champions respectively and on two episodes of Raw attempted to cash in, being thwarted by John Cena and Ricardo Rodriguez respectively. Ziggler defended the briefcase twice, on the August 20 episode of Raw to Chris Jericho and at TLC to Cena in a ladder match. Ziggler finally cashed in the contract, defeating Alberto Del Rio on the April 8, 2013, episode of Raw, after Del Rio had been attacked by Jack Swagger.

The feud between Sheamus and Alberto Del Rio continued into SummerSlam, where Sheamus "beat" Del Rio. After Sheamus attacked Ricardo Rodriguez, Del Rio sought David Otunga to ban the Brogue Kick. This was granted by SmackDown general manager Booker T. The ban was lifted at Night of Champions, where Sheamus won.

Also, at Raw 1000, CM Punk turned heel after attacking The Rock, who was helping John Cena fend off Big Show. At SummerSlam, Punk retained the WWE Championship against Cena and Show in a triple threat match and at Night of Champions against Cena, where the match ended in a draw. Punk would continue to defend the WWE Championship until the 2013 Royal Rumble, where, despite interference from The Shield, The Rock would defeat him for it.

== Results ==
No.	Results	Stipulations	Times
1^{P}	R-Truth and Kofi Kingston defeated Camacho and Hunico by pinfall	Tag team match	08:24
2	Dolph Ziggler (with Vickie Guerrero) defeated Christian, Cody Rhodes, Damien Sandow, Santino Marella, Sin Cara, Tensai (with Sakamoto), and Tyson Kidd	Money in the Bank ladder match for a World Heavyweight Championship match contract	18:29
3	Sheamus (c) defeated Alberto Del Rio (with Ricardo Rodriguez) by pinfall	Singles match for the World Heavyweight Championship	14:24
4	Primo and Epico (with Rosa Mendes) defeated The Prime Time Players (Darren Young and Titus O'Neil) (with A.W.) by pinfall	Tag team match	07:31
5	CM Punk (c) defeated Daniel Bryan by pinfall	No Disqualification match for the WWE Championship; AJ Lee served as the special guest referee.	27:48
6	Ryback defeated Curt Hawkins and Tyler Reks by pinfall	Handicap match	04:22
7	Kaitlyn, Layla, and Tamina Snuka defeated Beth Phoenix, Eve Torres, and Natalya by pinfall	Six-Diva tag team match	03:23
8	John Cena defeated Big Show, Chris Jericho, Kane, and The Miz	Money in the Bank ladder match for a WWE Championship match contract	20:03
(c) / – the champion(s) heading into the match; P / – the match was broadcast on the pre-show
