= Blade of the 47 Ronin =

- Official release poster
- Directed by: Ron Yuan
- Screenplay by: John Swetnam; Aimee Garcia; AJ Mendez
- Produced by: Tim Kwok
- Starring: Anna Akana; Mark Dacascos; Teresa Ting; Mike Moh; Dustin Nguyen; Yoshi Sudarso; Chris Pang
- Cinematography: L. T. Chang
- Edited by: Charles Norris
- Music by: Joe Hahn; Alec Puro
- Production companies: Universal Pictures; Universal 1440 Entertainment; Scrappy Heart Productions
- Distributed by: Netflix
- Release date: October 25, 2022
- Running time: 106 minutes
- Country: United States
- Language: English

Blade of the 47 Ronin is a 2022 American action fantasy film directed by Ron Yuan and written by John Swetnam, Aimee Garcia, and AJ Mendez, and is a sequel to 47 Ronin (2013). The film takes place 300 years after its predecessor, following the fight for the survival of the final descendants of the 47 Ronin.

Blade of the 47 Ronin was released as a Netflix Original Film on October 25, 2022.

== Plot ==
Three hundred years after the ronin samurai Oishi and Kai killed Master Kira and the witch Mizuki to avenge their master, Lord Asano, (Note: As depicted in 47 Ronin (2013 film)) samurai and witch clans remain secret. In the present day, the witch Yurei seeks the mystical Tengu sword used by the 47 Ronin, intending to unite it with the Witch Sword. He has killed the descendants of the 47 Ronin responsible for his ancestor's death. Lord Arai, a descendant of the 47 Ronin, seeks the Tengu sword to stop him, recruiting the witch Hirano to help locate it, but Yurei and his ninjas ambush and kill them.

In Budapest, samurai clan lords Okoro, Maeda, Shinshiro, Ikeda, and Nikko meet to discuss Arai's death. Suspecting Yurei's involvement, they fear an ancient prophecy that the true descendant of the 47 Ronin will wield both the Witch and Warrior Blades and defeat him. Onami, a swordswoman serving Shinshiro, recruits Reo, a former agent and tracker, to find the descendant first.

Luna, an Asian American thief, is summoned to collect Arai's inheritance, the Warrior Blade. When she attempts to sell it at a nightclub, Onami and Reo intervene, but Shinshiro takes them to his hotel. Yurei and his ninjas attack, though the samurai repel them. Shinshiro then takes Luna to the Record Keeper, Dash, and his assistant Hana. Dash has a vision that Yurei has united the two swords and will destroy the samurai.

Unable to contact the other lords, Shinshiro searches for them while Aya, Onami, Mai, and Reo train Luna. Onami and Reo leave Luna with Aya, but Yurei's ninjas ambush them, killing Shinshiro and the other samurai lords. Onami and Reo escape with Nikko and Mai. Meanwhile, Luna has visions of Yurei, who reveals that she is descended from witches and awakens her powers. Dash discovers that Luna's sword is the Witch Blade and has a vision identifying Onami as the true descendant of the 47 Ronin. Before he can tell the others, Hana, secretly working for Yurei, kills Dash and Aya and steals the Witch Blade.

Furious over Aya's death, Onami banishes Luna and vows revenge. Luna receives Dash's final message, directing her to the Warrior Sword at Arai's grave. Yurei tracks her through witch magic and attempts to recruit her, but she refuses, so he takes her hostage. He then meets Ikeda, who is revealed as a traitor, having supplied Yurei with ninjas in exchange for power.

Onami and the remaining samurai attack Yurei and his forces. Nikko kills Ikeda, while Onami, Reo, and Luna confront Yurei. He overpowers them, and Luna attempts to kill him with the Tengu Sword, but it cannot be wielded by anyone except the true descendant. Onami takes the sword and it responds to her. Luna pins Yurei with her witch magic, allowing Onami to kill him with the Tengu Sword. Onami reconciles with Luna and is welcomed into the samurai clan. She is subsequently inaugurated as Shinshiro's successor and becomes a samurai lord.

== Cast ==
- Anna Akana as Luna
- Mark Dacascos as Shinshiro
- Teresa Ting as Onami
- Mike Moh as Reo
- Dustin Nguyen as Nikko
- Chris Pang as Arai
- Daniel Southworth as Yurei
- Nino Furuhata as Dash
- Chikako Fukuyama as Aya
- Yoshi Sudarso as Sun
- Enikõ Fülöp as Hana
- Luna Fujimoto as Mai
- Akira Koieyama as Ikeda
- Dai Tabuchi as Hirano
- Gen Seto as Maeda
- Michael Daramola as Okoro

== Production ==
=== Development ===
In August 2020, a sequel to 47 Ronin was announced to be in development with Ron Yuan serving as director. The project was described by the filmmaker as "genre-blending", as a combination of martial arts, action, horror and cyber-punk genres. The plot of the film will take place 300 years "into the future", and will be produced by Universal 1440 Entertainment and distributed by Netflix. Production began in the first quarter of 2021.

In April 2021, Aimee Garcia and AJ Mendez joined the production as co-screenwriters; the pair of writing-collaborators' first feature film credit. By December 2021, it was revealed that John Swetnam had also joined the project as an additional screenwriter.

=== Casting ===
By December 2021, Anna Akana and Mark Dacascos joined the cast in leading roles; while Teresa Ting, Mike Moh, Dustin Nguyen, Yoshi Sudarso, and Chris Pang serve as the supporting cast.

=== Filming ===
Principal photography had commenced by December 2021 in Budapest, Hungary. Additionally, it was clarified that the plot will be set 300 years after the first film, as opposed to being set "in the future". The fictional plot, set in modern-day, centers around factions of Samurai who have operated in secrecy for centuries. The primary cast was announced, with Tim Kwok named as producer. The film will be a joint-venture production between Universal Pictures, Universal 1440 Entertainment, and Scrappy Heart Productions, and distributed by Netflix.

== Release ==
Blade of the 47 Ronin was released on October 25, 2022, via streaming by Universal Filmed Entertainment Group as a Netflix Original Film.

== Future ==
In October 2022, following the popularity of Blade of the 47 Ronin through its streaming release, it was announced that a third film is in development.
