= Money in the Bank (2013) =

WWE pay-per-view event

- Promotional poster featuring various WWE wrestlers
- Promotion: WWE
- Date: July 14, 2013
- City: Philadelphia, Pennsylvania
- Venue: Wells Fargo Center
- Attendance: 18,147
- Buy rate: 223,000

Pay-per-view chronology
← Previous; Payback	Next → SummerSlam

Money in the Bank chronology
← Previous; 2012	Next → 2014

The 2013 Money in the Bank was a professional wrestling pay-per-view (PPV) event produced by WWE. It was the fourth annual Money in the Bank event and took place on July 14, 2013, at the Wells Fargo Center in Philadelphia, Pennsylvania. The event centered on the men's Money in the Bank ladder match, a multi-person ladder match where the wrestlers compete to retrieve a briefcase hanging above the ring which contains a contract for a guaranteed world championship match at any time within the next year.

The event featured eight matches, with one on the Kickoff pre-show. There were two Money in the Bank ladder matches, including the main event, which Randy Orton won for a WWE Championship match contract. The other Money in the Bank ladder match opened the show and saw Damien Sandow win to earn a World Heavyweight Championship match contract. Other prominent matches included John Cena defeating Mark Henry by submission to retain the WWE Championship, Curtis Axel defeating The Miz to retain the WWE Intercontinental Championship, and AJ Lee defeating Kaitlyn to retain the WWE Divas Championship. The event also featured the return of Rob Van Dam, who competed in his first WWE match since the 2009 Royal Rumble and his first full-time match since 2007.

The event received 223,000 pay-per-view buys, which was up from the previous year's event of 206,000. It was the final Money in the Bank event to be held in July until the 2021 event. This was also the final Money in the Bank event to broadcast exclusively via traditional PPV outlets due to the launch of the WWE Network streaming service in February 2014. It was also the last to feature the previous version of the World Heavyweight Championship, which was unified with the WWE Championship in December. This in turn made it the final to feature two Money in the Bank ladder matches until 2017.

== Production ==
=== Background ===
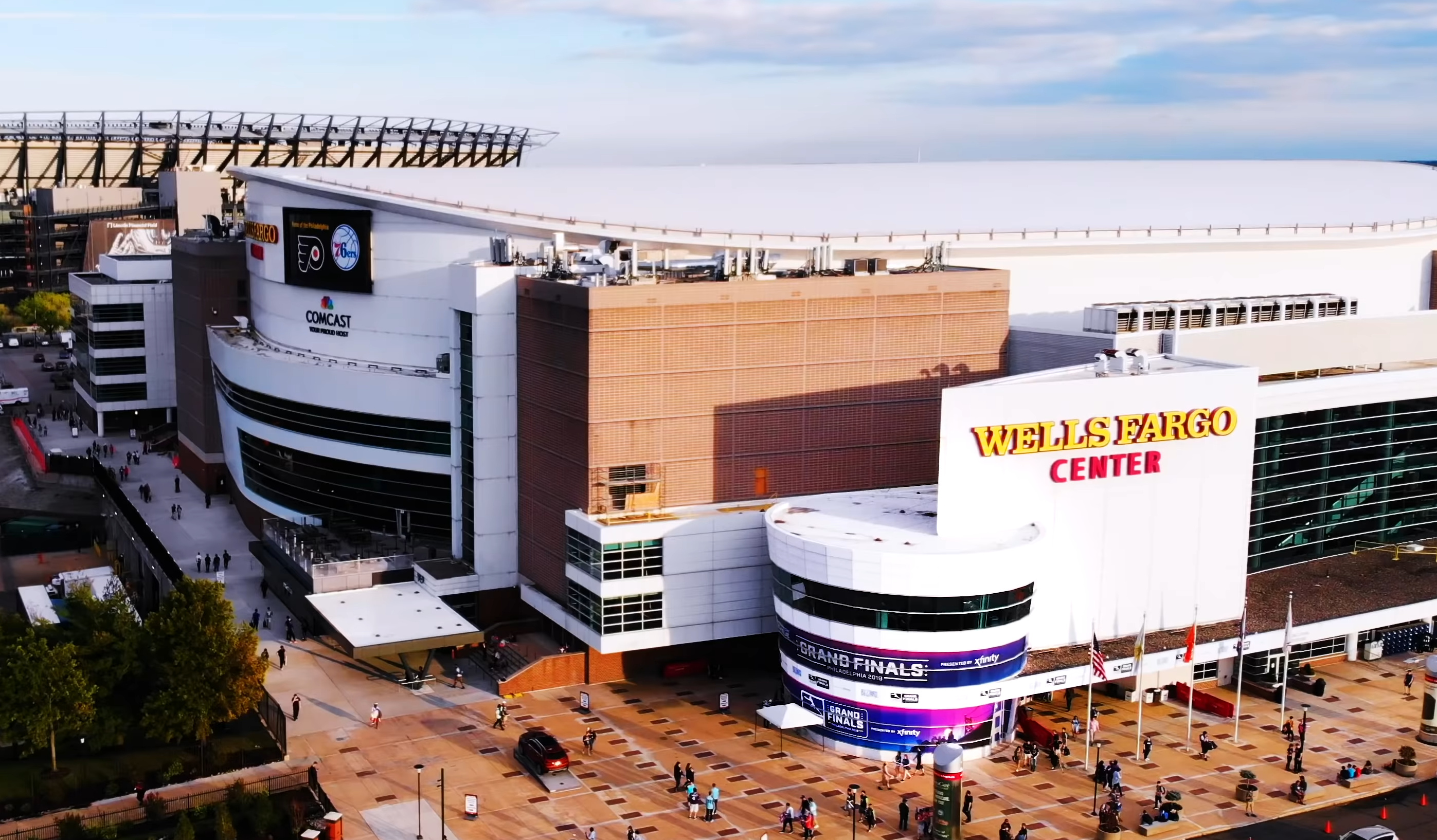
The fourth annual Money in the Bank event was held at the Wells Fargo Center in Philadelphia, Pennsylvania.

Money in the Bank is an annual professional wrestling pay-per-view (PPV) event produced by WWE since 2010, which at the time was held in July. The concept of the event comes from WWE's established Money in the Bank ladder match, in which multiple wrestlers use ladders to retrieve a briefcase hanging above the ring. The briefcase contains a contract that guarantees the winner a match for a world championship at any time within the next year. The fourth Money in the Bank event took place on July 14, 2013, at the Wells Fargo Center in Philadelphia, Pennsylvania. Like the previous year, two Money in the Bank ladder matches occurred; one granted a contract for a WWE Championship match while the other contained a World Heavyweight Championship match contract.

=== Storylines ===
The professional wrestling matches at Money in the Bank featured professional wrestlers performing as characters in scripted events pre-determined by the hosting promotion, WWE. Storylines were produced on WWE's weekly television shows, Raw and SmackDown.

At Payback in June, a promo announced the return of Rob Van Dam, who last competed for WWE in the 2009 Royal Rumble match, for Money in the Bank.

On the June 17 episode of Raw, WWE Champion John Cena recalled his many woes and failures in 2012, and his eventual return to the main event of WrestleMania 29, where he finally defeated The Rock and won the WWE Championship, ultimately thanking the fans for their support to him. As he finished, Mark Henry then came out to the ring to seemingly retire. After an emotional promo, which prompted Cena to come to the ring to congratulate him, Henry revealed the act as a ruse to attack Cena with the World's Strongest Slam and declare his intentions to challenge for the one major championship he has never won in his career, the WWE Championship.

After Alberto Del Rio defeated Dolph Ziggler for the World Heavyweight Championship at Payback, Ziggler invoked his rematch clause on the June 24 episode of Raw. Accordingly, a rematch was booked for Money in the Bank.

On the same show, Executive Vice President Stephanie McMahon announced the participants competing in the Money in the Bank ladder match for a WWE Championship contract, which included CM Punk, Sheamus, Randy Orton, Daniel Bryan, Christian, Kane, and the returning Rob Van Dam. Unusually, all of these participants were faces at the time. On the July 8 episode of Raw, Kane was removed from the match after being injured by the debuting Wyatt Family (Bray Wyatt, Luke Harper, and Erick Rowan).

The same night, after both had complained about being left off the pay-per-view, Ryback and Chris Jericho were booked in a match against each other at Money in the Bank by then-Raw Managing Supervisor Vickie Guerrero.

Also on this show, The Usos (Jey Uso and Jimmy Uso) won a triple threat tag team match, defeating Tons of Funk and 3MB's Jinder Mahal and Drew McIntyre, to become number one contenders to the WWE Tag Team Championship, earning a title match against the champions Roman Reigns and Seth Rollins (of The Shield) which would take place at the Money in the Bank Kickoff pre-show.

On the June 28 episode of SmackDown, Senior Advisor Theodore Long introduced the participants in the Money in the Bank ladder match for a contract to wrestle for the World Heavyweight Championship: United States Champion Dean Ambrose, Cody Rhodes, Damien Sandow, Fandango, Antonio Cesaro, Jack Swagger, and Wade Barrett. In contrast with the WWE Championship contract match, all of these participants were heels.

On the July 1 episode of Raw, Curtis Axel was scheduled to defend the Intercontinental Championship against The Miz, and that Kaitlyn would challenge AJ Lee for the Divas Championship, which AJ won from Kaitlyn at Payback.

== Event ==
Other on-screen personnel
Role:	Name:
English Commentators	Michael Cole
English Commentators	Jerry Lawler
English Commentators	John "Bradshaw" Layfield
Spanish Commentators	Carlos Cabrera
Spanish Commentators	Marcelo Rodriguez
Ring announcers	Tony Chimel (kickoff show)
Ring announcers	Lilian Garcia
Ring announcers	Justin Roberts
Interviewer	Tony Dawson
Referees	Mike Chioda
Referees	John Cone
Referees	Rod Zapata
Referees	Scott Armstrong
Referees	Justin King
Referees	Ryan Tran
Referees	Chad Patton
Pre-show panel	Josh Mathews
Pre-show panel	Big Show
Pre-show panel	Kofi Kingston
Pre-show panel	Vickie Guerrero

=== Pre-show ===
During the Money in the Bank Kickoff pre-show The Shield's Seth Rollins and Roman Reigns defended the WWE Tag Team Championship against The Usos (Jey Uso and Jimmy Uso). In the end, Reigns executed a Spear on Jimmy for the victory.

=== Preliminary matches ===
The actual pay-per-view opened with the World Heavyweight Championship contract Money in the Bank ladder match involving United States Champion Dean Ambrose, Cody Rhodes, Damien Sandow, Fandango, Antonio Cesaro, Jack Swagger, and Wade Barrett. During the match, Swagger pulled Barrett off a ladder and Cesaro executed a European Uppercut on Barrett. Swagger pulled Ambrose off the ladder, who delivered a DDT to Swagger. Cesaro applied a Sleeper Hold on Ambrose atop the ladder, causing Ambrose to fall. On top of the ladder, Rhodes performed a Muscle Buster onto a ladder on Cesaro. Barrett knocked Swagger off the ladder with a Bull Hammer but Fandango performed a Sunset Flip Powerbomb off the ladder on him. Cesaro attempted to retrieve the briefcase whilst on Swagger's shoulders but Rhodes performed a Springboard Dropkick on Swagger, knocking both men down. Seth Rollins and Roman Reigns interfered, with the two pulling Rhodes off a ladder and Reigns executing a Spear on Fandango. The Usos (Jey Uso and Jimmy Uso) also interfered, attacking Rollins and Ambrose. In the end, Rhodes pushed Ambrose off a ladder onto Rollins, Reigns, the Usos, Swagger and Cesaro. Rhodes attempted to retrieve the briefcase but Sandow pushed Rhodes off the ladder and retrieved the briefcase to win the match.

In the second match, Curtis Axel defended the Intercontinental Championship against The Miz. The match ended when Axel executed a Hangman's Facebuster on Miz to retain the title.

After that, AJ Lee defended the Divas Championship against Kaitlyn. AJ forced Kaitlyn to submit to the Black Widow to retain the title.

In the fourth match, Ryback faced Chris Jericho. The match ended when Jericho missed a Lionsault after Ryback rolled out of the way and was rolled-up by Ryback for the victory.

In the next match, Alberto Del Rio faced Dolph Ziggler for the World Heavyweight Championship. In the end, Divas Champion AJ Lee hit Del Rio with the WWE Divas Championship belt, resulting in Del Rio winning the match by disqualification to retain the title.

In the penultimate match, John Cena faced Mark Henry for the WWE Championship. The match ended when Cena applied the STF on Henry. Henry tried to reach the ropes to break the hold, but Cena re-applied the STF and Henry submitted. In result, Cena retained the title.

=== Main event ===
The main event was the WWE Championship contract Money in the Bank ladder match involving CM Punk, Sheamus, Randy Orton, Daniel Bryan, Christian, and the returning Rob Van Dam. During the match, Van Dam executed a Rolling Thunder Senton on Bryan, who was laid out on a ladder. Sheamus performed a Rolling Fireman's Carry Slam onto a ladder on Van Dam. Sheamus caused Bryan to fall off the ladder by executing Beats of the Bodhran on him. Orton executed an Exploder Suplex on Punk into a ladder, followed by an Elevated DDT. Van Dam and Christian were climbing a ladder when the ladder fell over; Christian fell while Van Dam leapt onto another ladder and performed a Five Star Frog Splash on Christian. Bryan drove a ladder against Orton, who was standing in the ring corner, with a Running Corner Dropkick and then attacked Sheamus with a ladder, knocking him off the top rope through a ladder bridged between the ring apron and a broadcast table. Bryan attempted to retrieve the briefcase but Curtis Axel interfered, attacking Bryan with a chair and executing a Hangman's Facebuster on Bryan. Punk executed a GTS on Axel and then attempted to retrieve the briefcase. Paul Heyman appeared, seemingly to support Punk, but then pushed a ladder into Punk repeatedly until Punk fell down. Van Dam attempted to retrieve the briefcase but Orton pulled him down, performed an RKO on him and retrieved the briefcase to win the match.

== Reception ==
Money in the Bank 2013 was well received. John Canton of TJR Wrestling gave the entire event a rating of 7.5 out of 10, praising both the Money in the Bank ladder matches, giving the World heavyweight Championship one 4 stars out of 5 and WWE Championship one 4.5 stars out of 5, calling the latter "a great ladder match". 411Mania also praised the event though they considered the World Heavyweight Championship Money In The Bank ladder match to be the match of the night. Similarly, Bleacher Report positively reviewed the event, however they considered the WWE Championship Money in the Bank Ladder match as the match of the night giving it a letter grade of A and also calling it a great ladder match.

== Aftermath ==
The next night on Raw, Paul Heyman confronted the audience and explained to CM Punk why he stabbed him in the back stating that they were the best in the world and that CM Punk couldn't beat Brock Lesnar. Punk stated that he would get his hands on Heyman and anyone else got in his way. Lesnar showed up and brawled with Punk and attacked him with an F5 onto the broadcast table. The next week Punk talked about how he kept getting up and that he was not afraid of Brock Lesnar. Punk offered a challenge at SummerSlam against Lesnar. Paul Heyman appeared on the titantron via satellite and accepted the match. Heyman appeared ringside when Curtis Axel faced and defeated R-Truth, but Punk came out to assault both Heyman and Axel.

Brad Maddox came out to the ring but was interrupted by John Cena. Maddox then told Cena that he could choose his own opponent at SummerSlam. Several superstars talked to Cena backstage about choosing them to face him. At the end of the night, Cena listened to the audience's opinion and chose Daniel Bryan. The next week the two had a contract signing. Maddox would state that he didn't think Bryan had what it takes and told him to prove himself. Maddox then put him in a gauntlet match against Jack Swagger, Antonio Cesaro and Ryback. Bryan beat both Swagger and Cesaro and defeated Ryback by disqualification when Ryback powerbombed him through a table. Cena eventually made the save and challenged Ryback to a tables match on Raw a week later, in which he defeated Ryback.

The following night on Raw, Cody Rhodes turned face by attacking Damien Sandow, ending Team Rhodes Scholars. On the July 26 episode of SmackDown, Rhodes stole the briefcase while Sandow was facing (and was defeated by) Randy Orton and threw it into the Gulf of Mexico. Sandow couldn't retrieve it because he couldn't swim. On the August 5 episode of Raw, Rhodes would throw the briefcase to Sandow and a match between the two was scheduled for SummerSlam.

After Chris Jericho lost a match against Curtis Axel on SmackDown, he was attacked by Ryback. Jericho then left WWE in reality to tour with his band Fozzy.

While Mark Henry was giving a speech, The Shield (Roman Reigns, Seth Rollins, and Dean Ambrose) interrupted and attacked him. The following Friday on SmackDown, The Usos (Jey Uso and Jimmy Uso) were set to face The Shield until they were attacked in the ring. Henry made the save and fended off The Shield. The next Monday on Raw, Henry told The Shield he was ready for a fight so The Shield came out to attack Henry until The Usos made the save. Three days later, The Shield defeated The Usos and Mark Henry in a six-man tag team match before Henry furiously went after the group, forcing The Shield to retreat.

Dolph Ziggler broke up with AJ Lee, but later on during Ziggler's non-title rematch against Alberto Del Rio, AJ would ring the bell to distract Ziggler for Del Rio to win. AJ assaulted Ziggler, who was then attacked by Big E Langston. The following SmackDown, Ziggler said that he was sorry for not dumping AJ sooner. The next week on Raw, Big E tried to attack Ziggler after winning a match against Darren Young, but Ziggler managed to get away. The following SmackDown, AJ delivered her "State of Her Mind" address, discussing her relationship with Ziggler and her friendship with Kaitlyn, but Kaitlyn attacked her and Ziggler assaulted Langston. On Raw, Kaitlyn defeated AJ in a single match to stay in the Divas title contention. Ziggler demanded a match with Langston, defeating him via disqualification due to AJ interfering. Layla turned heel when she protected AJ during her title match with Kaitlyn on the August 2 episode of SmackDown, causing Kaitlyn to lose the match. On Raw, Layla defeated Kaitlyn and solidified her alliance with AJ Lee and later on, Langston defeated Ziggler. AJ and Big E Langston were scheduled to face Dolph Ziggler and Kaitlyn in a mixed tag team match at SummerSlam, which Ziggler and Kaitlyn won.

This was the final Money in the Bank event to broadcast exclusively via traditional PPV outlets due to the launch of the WWE Network streaming service in February 2014. It was also the last to feature the previous version of the World Heavyweight Championship, which was unified with the WWE Championship in December at TLC: Tables, Ladders & Chairs; the World Heavyweight Championship was immediately retired while the WWE Championship became known as the WWE World Heavyweight Championship. This in turn made it the final to have two Money in the Bank ladder matches until 2017. This was also the final Money in the Bank event to be held in July until 2021.

== Results ==
No.	Results	Stipulations	Times
1^{P}	The Shield (Roman Reigns and Seth Rollins) (c) defeated The Usos (Jey Uso and Jimmy Uso) by pinfall	Tag team match for the WWE Tag Team Championship	14:46
2	Damien Sandow defeated Antonio Cesaro, Cody Rhodes, Dean Ambrose, Fandango (with Summer Rae), Jack Swagger (with Zeb Colter), and Wade Barrett	Money in the Bank ladder match for a World Heavyweight Championship match contract	16:24
3	Curtis Axel (c) (with Paul Heyman) defeated The Miz by pinfall	Singles match for the WWE Intercontinental Championship	9:19
4	AJ Lee (c) (with Big E Langston) defeated Kaitlyn (with Layla) by submission	Singles match for the WWE Divas Championship	7:01
5	Ryback defeated Chris Jericho by pinfall	Singles match	11:19
6	Alberto Del Rio (c) defeated Dolph Ziggler by disqualification	Singles match for the World Heavyweight Championship	14:29
7	John Cena (c) defeated Mark Henry by submission	Singles match for the WWE Championship	14:42
8	Randy Orton defeated Christian, CM Punk, Daniel Bryan, Rob Van Dam, and Sheamus	Money in the Bank ladder match for a WWE Championship match contract	26:38
(c) / – the champion(s) heading into the match; P / – the match was broadcast on the pre-show
