= AJ Lee =

American professional wrestler and author (born 1987)

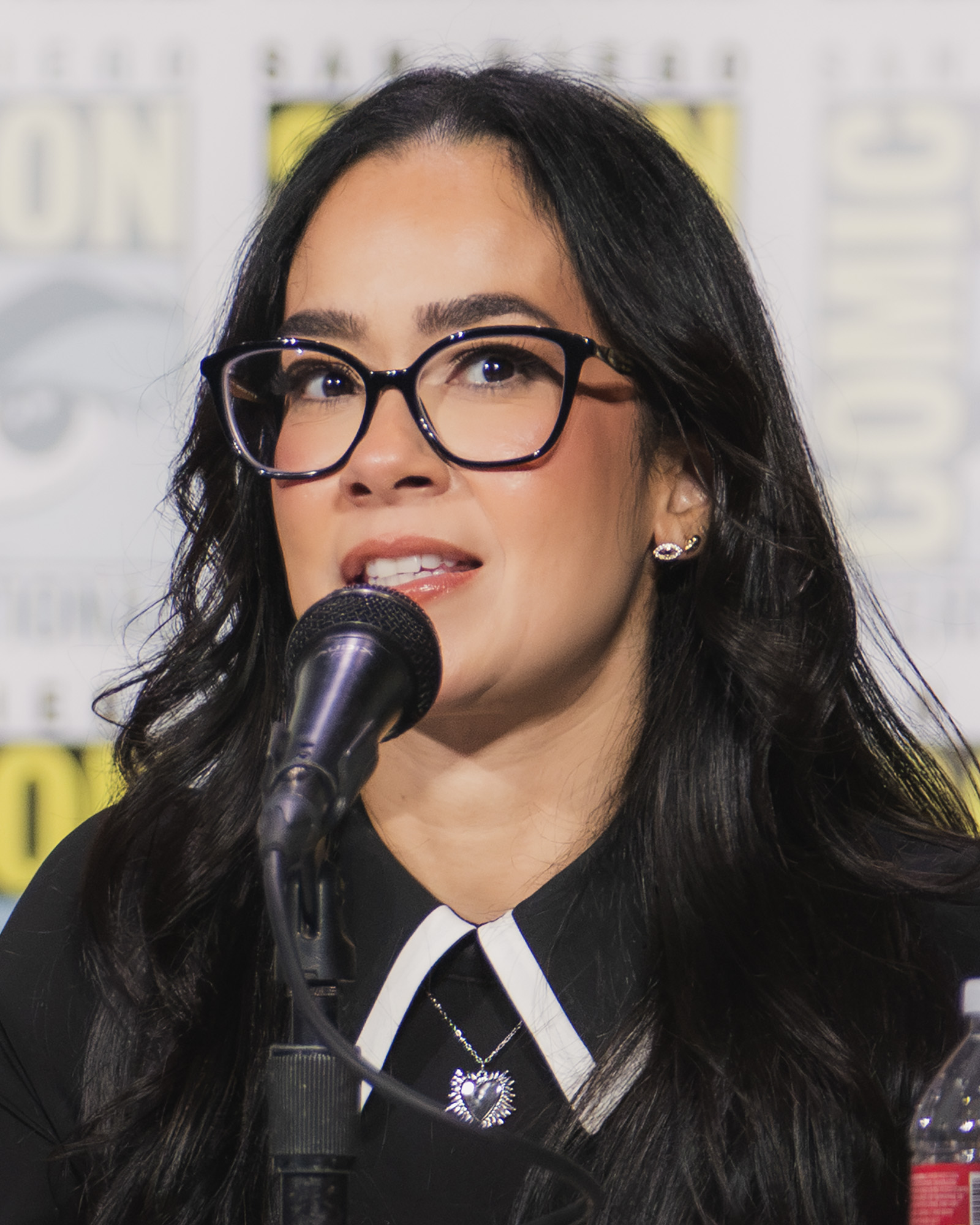
- AJ in 2026

Personal information
- Born: April Jeanette Mendez; March 19, 1987 (age 39) Union City, New Jersey, U.S.
- Occupations: Professional wrestler; author
- Years active: 2007–present
- Spouse: CM Punk (m. 2014)
- Website: theajmendez.com

Professional wrestling career
- Ring names: AJ; AJ Lee; April Lee; Miss April
- Billed height: 5 ft 2 in (157 cm)
- Billed weight: 115 lb (52 kg)
- Billed from: Union City, New Jersey
- Trained by: Florida Championship Wrestling; Jay Lethal
- Debut: 2007

April Jeanette Mendez (born March 19, 1987) is an American professional wrestler and author. As a wrestler, she has been signed to WWE since September 2025, where she performs part time under the ring name AJ Lee.

Mendez began her professional wrestling career in 2007 in New Jersey's independent circuit. She signed with WWE in 2009 and spent two years in its developmental branch, Florida Championship Wrestling, before her promotion to the main roster. In 2012, she rose to prominence through storylines with her "mentally unstable" character, such as high-profile relationships and a three-month stint as the General Manager of Raw. In subsequent years, she won the Divas Championship a record-tying three times (Note: She shares the record of three reigns with Eve Torres.) and held the title for an overall record of 406 days. She also won the Slammy Award for Diva of the Year in 2012 and 2014, and readers of Pro Wrestling Illustrated voted her Woman of the Year from 2012 to 2014. She initially retired from in-ring performing in April 2015, but returned to WWE over a decade later in September 2025, after which she won the Women's Intercontinental Championship once.

Outside of wrestling, Mendez has focused on writing. Her 2017 memoir, Crazy Is My Superpower, was a New York Times Best Seller. She formed a writing partnership with actress Aimee Garcia in 2019, and the duo have written multiple comic books, as well as the 2022 Netflix film Blade of the 47 Ronin.

== Early life ==
April Jeanette Mendez was born on March 19, 1987, in Union City, New Jersey. Her mother, Janet Acevedo, was a homemaker and later a home health aide, while her father, Robert Mendez, was an automotive engineer. She is the youngest of three children, and is of Puerto Rican descent. In describing her childhood, Mendez said her family struggled with poverty, mental illness, and drug addiction. They frequently moved between apartments, sometimes living in motels or their car when they could not afford rent.

Her brother's interest in World Wrestling Entertainment (WWE) influenced her to become a professional wrestler. With inspiration from WWE's female wrestlers, especially Lita, she cemented her ambition at 12 years old. In 2005, she graduated from Memorial High School in West New York, New Jersey. She attended New York University's Tisch School of the Arts, where she majored in film and television production, until family and financial issues led to her dropping out six months into her studies. Afterward, she started working full-time to afford wrestling training. As an homage to her brother, who was in the U.S. Army, she occasionally wore camouflage wrestling attire.

Mendez was diagnosed with bipolar disorder, a condition her mother also suffered from, around the age of 20. She had previously experienced adverse effects from a misdiagnosis of depression, and overdosed on antidepressants and painkillers. This event, which she considers a suicide attempt, caused her to seek proper treatment and the right diagnosis. She credits the condition for giving her the bravery to achieve her goals.

== Professional wrestling career ==
=== Early career (2007–2009) ===
In March 2007, Mendez enrolled in a wrestling school close to her home, where she was trained by Jay Lethal. Around late 2007, she began to perform on the New Jersey independent circuit under the ring name Miss April. She joined the New Jersey–based promotion Women Superstars Uncensored (WSU) in October 2008. After little success in her first months, Miss April formed a tag team with Brooke Carter, who together captured the WSU Tag Team Championship in February 2009. She also won the annual WSU/National Wrestling Superstars King and Queen of the Ring tournament alongside Jay Lethal two months later. In May, she left WSU upon signing with WWE and relinquished her championship.

=== World Wrestling Entertainment / WWE ===
==== Florida Championship Wrestling and NXT (2009–2011) ====
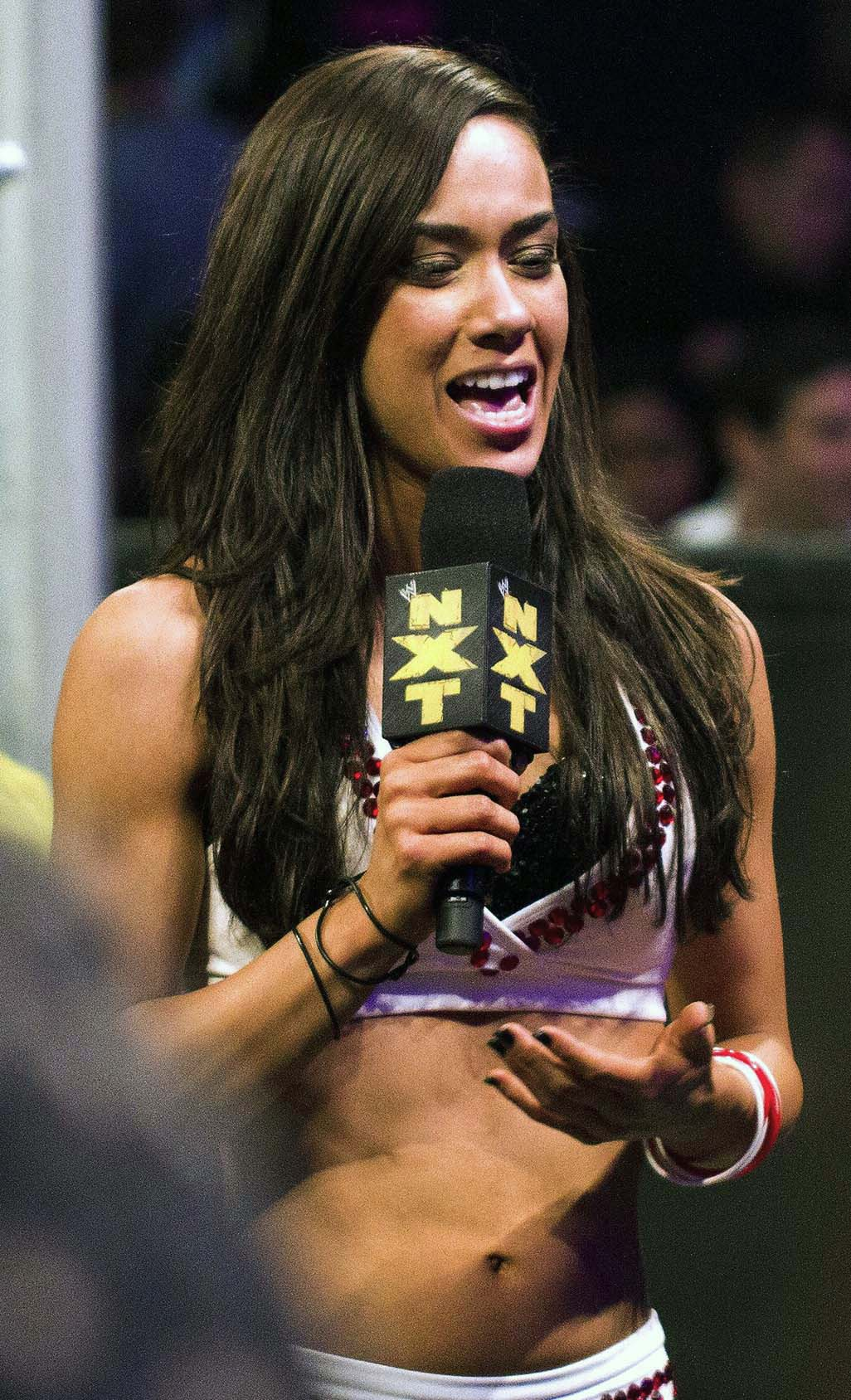
AJ delivering a farewell speech after being eliminated from season three of NXT.

WWE signed Mendez to a contract in May 2009 after she paid US$1,500 to attend a tryout camp. She reported to Florida Championship Wrestling (FCW), WWE's developmental territory, and debuted under the ring name April Lee at a house show in late July. Shortly thereafter, her name was changed to AJ Lee. In February 2010, AJ defeated Serena Mancini to win the Queen of FCW title. A few months later, AJ was eliminated from a tournament that determined the inaugural FCW Divas Champion; she engaged in a feud with the winner, Naomi Knight, and her character became a heel (bad guy). In November, AJ lost the Queen of FCW title to Rosa Mendes. AJ then defeated Naomi for the FCW Divas Championship in December, which made her the first to win both titles available to FCW's female wrestlers. She held the championship until April 2011, when she lost it to Aksana.

While in FCW, Mendez took part in the third season of NXT beginning in September 2010. The show mixed professional wrestling and reality competition formats as six female participants from FCW competed to be WWE's "next breakout star". Primo was assigned as her "WWE Pro", the role of her mentor in the storyline. She performed as a face (good guy) on the show and WWE adapted her "nerd" fandom to her character. Throughout the season, a relationship between AJ and Primo was teased, with them ultimately kissing on the finale. She also developed an on-screen friendship with fellow competitor, Kaitlyn. On November 23, AJ was eliminated in third place.

AJ made her main roster debut on the May 27, 2011, episode of SmackDown as part of a tag team with Kaitlyn, referring to themselves as "The Chickbusters". Along with their mentor Natalya, they feuded with the trio of Alicia Fox, Tamina Snuka, and Rosa Mendes for two months. In late July, AJ began a brief storyline on NXT Redemption as the girlfriend of Hornswoggle and feuded with Maxine. Meanwhile, on SmackDown, she was attacked by Natalya, who turned on her protégé and allied with Beth Phoenix to form the Divas of Doom. AJ and Kaitlyn repeatedly lost to the Divas of Doom over the following months, upsetting Kaitlyn.

==== Various relationships and Raw General Manager (2011–2013) ====
By November 2011, AJ was featured in an on-screen relationship with Daniel Bryan, who won the World Heavyweight Championship the following month and began portraying a villainous character. Although AJ expressed romantic interest in Bryan, he did not reciprocate. On the January 13, 2012 episode of SmackDown, she was accidentally knocked down by Big Show during Bryan's title defense and was taken out on a stretcher as part of the storyline. She returned on the February 3 episode, preventing Bryan from being attacked by Big Show. In the following weeks, Bryan began to mistreat AJ, though she continued to support him. At WrestleMania XXVIII on April 1, after AJ kissed Bryan before his match, he was defeated by Sheamus in 18 seconds, losing the world title. Bryan attributed the loss to AJ and ended their relationship. AJ made repeated attempts to reconcile, but Bryan rejected her. She later attacked Natalya and Kaitlyn after they tried to comfort her, marking the beginning of a new phase for her character, portrayed as increasingly unstable.

AJ turned her affections to Bryan's rival and WWE Champion CM Punk as well as Kane. At No Way Out on June 17, AJ interfered in a triple threat match for the WWE Championship between Punk, Bryan, and Kane, helping Punk retain his title by distracting Kane. As Bryan and Punk's feud progressed, AJ was announced as the special guest referee for their title match at Money in the Bank. Bryan made advances on AJ in an attempt to influence her, however, she focused her attention on Punk. Enraged by his disinterest on the July 2 episode of Raw, she interfered in his match and shoved him, along with Bryan, through a ringside table. After they made amends, she proposed to him but Bryan countered with a proposal of his own; Punk rejected her offer and she slapped both men. At Money in the Bank on July 15, as referee, AJ counted Punk's pinfall on Bryan, resulting in a successful title defense for Punk; as Punk celebrated over a fallen Bryan, AJ was left alone. The next night, Bryan proposed to her again and she accepted.

During the exchange of vows at Raw 1000, AJ announced that WWE chairman Vince McMahon had offered her the job of Raw General Manager and left Bryan at the altar. Her on-screen authority role began on July 30, where she alleged that Bryan only wanted the legal leverage to have her committed and forced him to undergo his own psychological evaluation. AJ continued to exact revenge on both Bryan and Punk throughout her tenure, denying their requests and booking them in matches against their wishes. On August 27 and September 24, she was involved in separate altercations with Vickie Guerrero and Paul Heyman, in which she attacked them. AJ was reprimanded by the board of directors, and the two demanded the General Manager position for themselves, deeming her too childish.

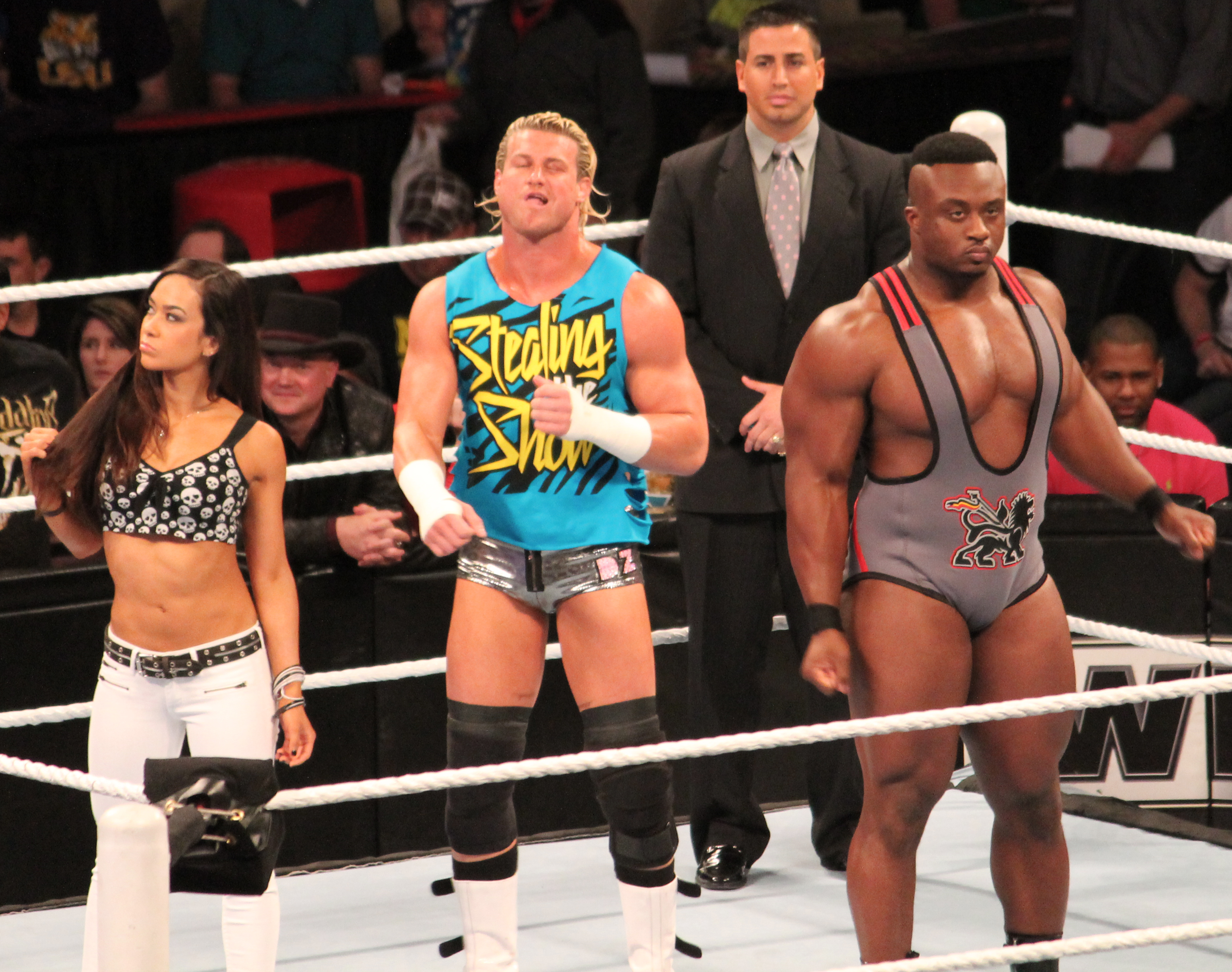
AJ alongside Dolph Ziggler (center) and her bodyguard Big E Langston (right) in February 2013

AJ stepped down from her General Manager duties on October 22, becoming embroiled in a scandal storyline with John Cena. Vickie Guerrero alleged that they had an affair and presented various material over the next month to support her claim. AJ and Cena denied the accusations and eventually formed a relationship, though Cena grew reluctant due to her behavior. Meanwhile, Cena feuded with Vickie Guerrero's client, Dolph Ziggler, over Ziggler's Money in the Bank contract. During their match at TLC on December 16, AJ turned heel by interfering and pushing Cena off a ladder, causing him to lose. She solidified a relationship with Ziggler the next night on Raw and they teamed together against Cena and Guerrero in the main event, which ended in disqualification after the debuting Big E Langston attacked Cena on her behalf. Subsequently accompanied by Langston as her bodyguard, she explained that Cena had "toyed with" her emotions and "broke her heart", so she helped Ziggler "break" him.

In March 2013, AJ's storyline rivalry with ex-boyfriend Daniel Bryan was reignited when they traded insults backstage. AJ and Langston assisted Ziggler in victories over Bryan and his tag team partner Kane, which led to Ziggler and Langston losing to them in a WWE Tag Team Championship match at WrestleMania 29 on April 7, despite her interference. The next night on Raw, AJ and Langston accompanied Ziggler as he cashed in his Money in the Bank contract on Alberto Del Rio to win the World Heavyweight Championship.

==== Divas Champion and initial retirement (2013–2015) ====
AJ won a battle royal on April 22, 2013, to become the number one contender to Kaitlyn's WWE Divas Championship. Kaitlyn soon began a storyline where she received gifts from a secret admirer. On June 10, after setting up Langston to pose as the admirer, AJ revealed it to be a mind game, berated Kaitlyn and left her in tears. Six days later at Payback, AJ defeated Kaitlyn to capture her first Divas Championship. While she continued to mock Kaitlyn, they participated in the first ever in-ring contract signing for a Divas Championship bout. At Money in the Bank on July 14, AJ won their rematch but later in the show caused Ziggler to lose his own rematch for the World Heavyweight Championship. AJ hit his opponent, Alberto Del Rio, with her title belt to protect him from further head injury, prompting a disqualification. Angered by her unwanted action, Ziggler ended their relationship. AJ exacted revenge by costing him another match, then attacked him with Langston. On August 2, Langston was banned from attending her matches. However, AJ again retained the title from Kaitlyn, who was betrayed by Layla. Kaitlyn and Ziggler ultimately joined to defeat AJ and Langston in a mixed tag team match at SummerSlam on August 18.

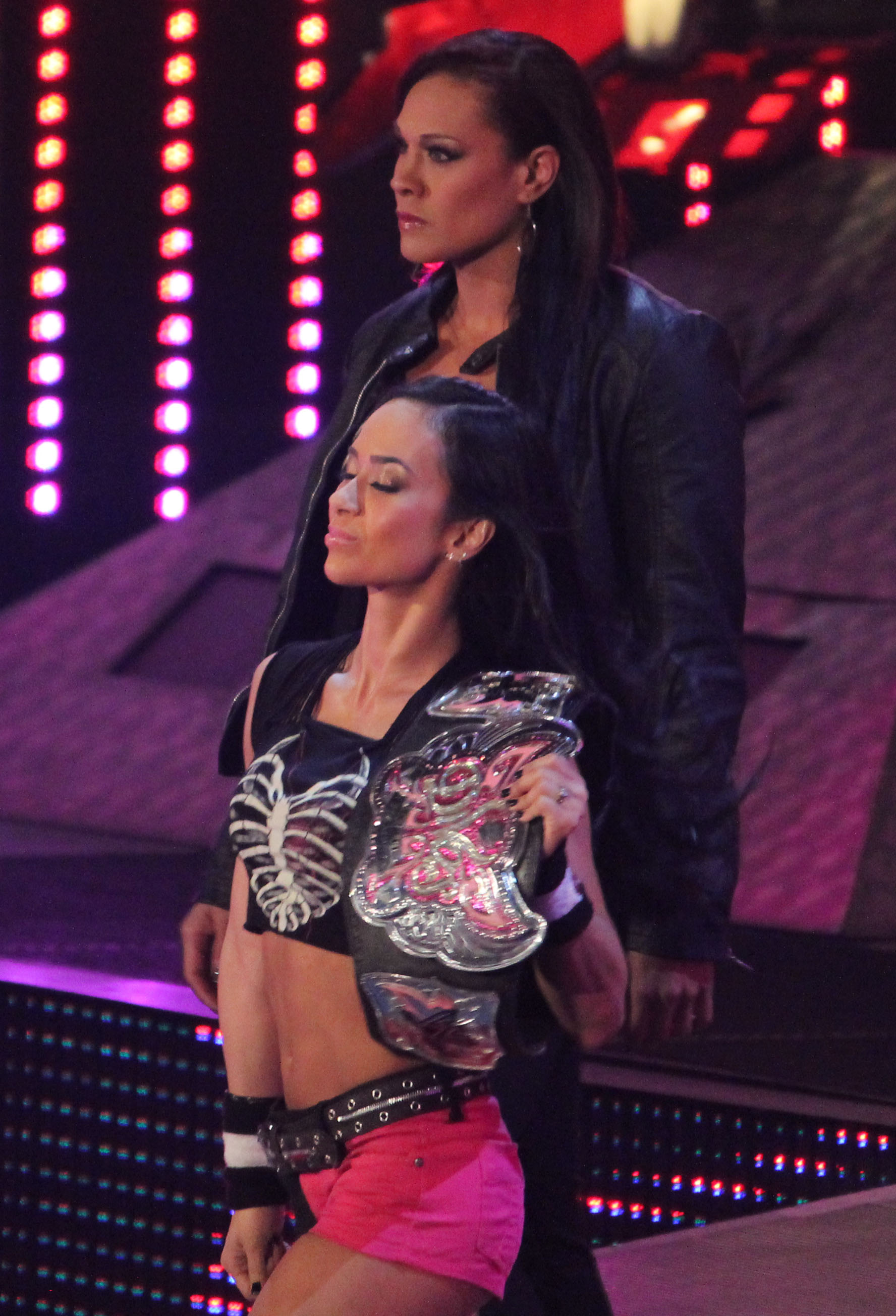
AJ, as the WWE Divas Champion, accompanied by her bodyguard Tamina Snuka in April 2014

On August 26, AJ interrupted the cast of Total Divas (Note: The Total Divas cast consisted of Brie and Nikki Bella, Naomi, Natalya, Cameron, Eva Marie, and JoJo Offerman.) during a post-match segment and insulted them. She later vowed to defeat every member of the cast, and enlisted Tamina Snuka as her bodyguard. Throughout the remainder of the year, AJ successfully defended the championship against the trio of Brie Bella, Naomi, and Natalya at Night of Champions, Brie Bella at both Battleground and Hell in a Cell, and Natalya at TLC. She also captained a team at Survivor Series in a traditional seven-on-seven elimination tag team match against the entire cast, which her team lost.

In January 2014, AJ became the longest-reigning Divas Champion at the time. (Note: She surpassed Maryse's 216-day reign set in July 2009 (recognized as 212 days by WWE).) After fending off title contenders Cameron and Natalya, AJ renewed her on-screen rivalry with SmackDown General Manager Vickie Guerrero, who forced her to defend the Divas Championship in a 14-woman match at WrestleMania XXX. AJ won the match on April 6, marking the first time the championship had been contested for at WWE's flagship event. The next night on Raw, AJ challenged the debuting Paige to an impromptu title match and was defeated, ending her then-record reign at 295 days. (Note: Nikki Bella broke the record in September 2015, with a 301-day reign.) Mendez was subsequently granted time off.

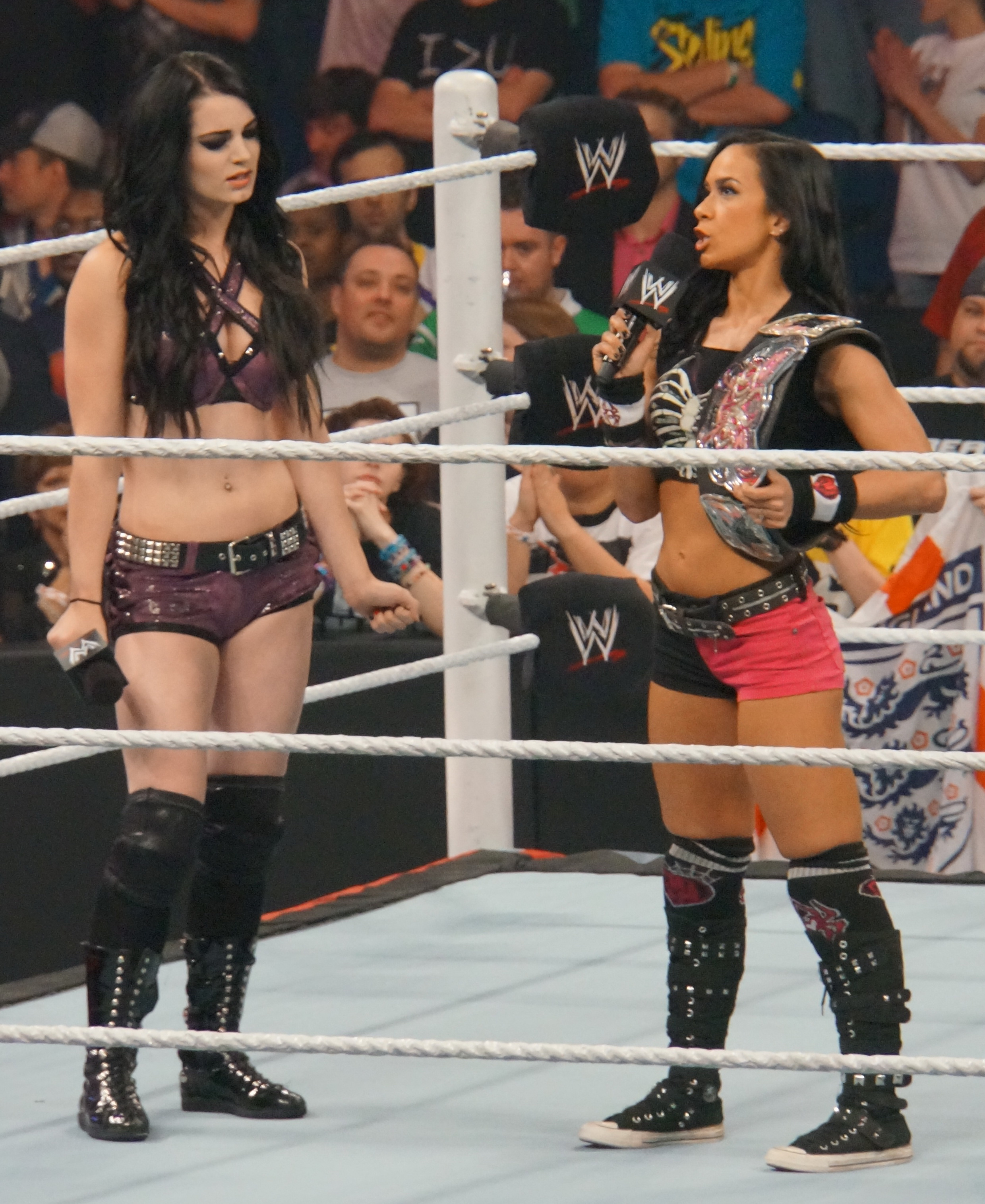
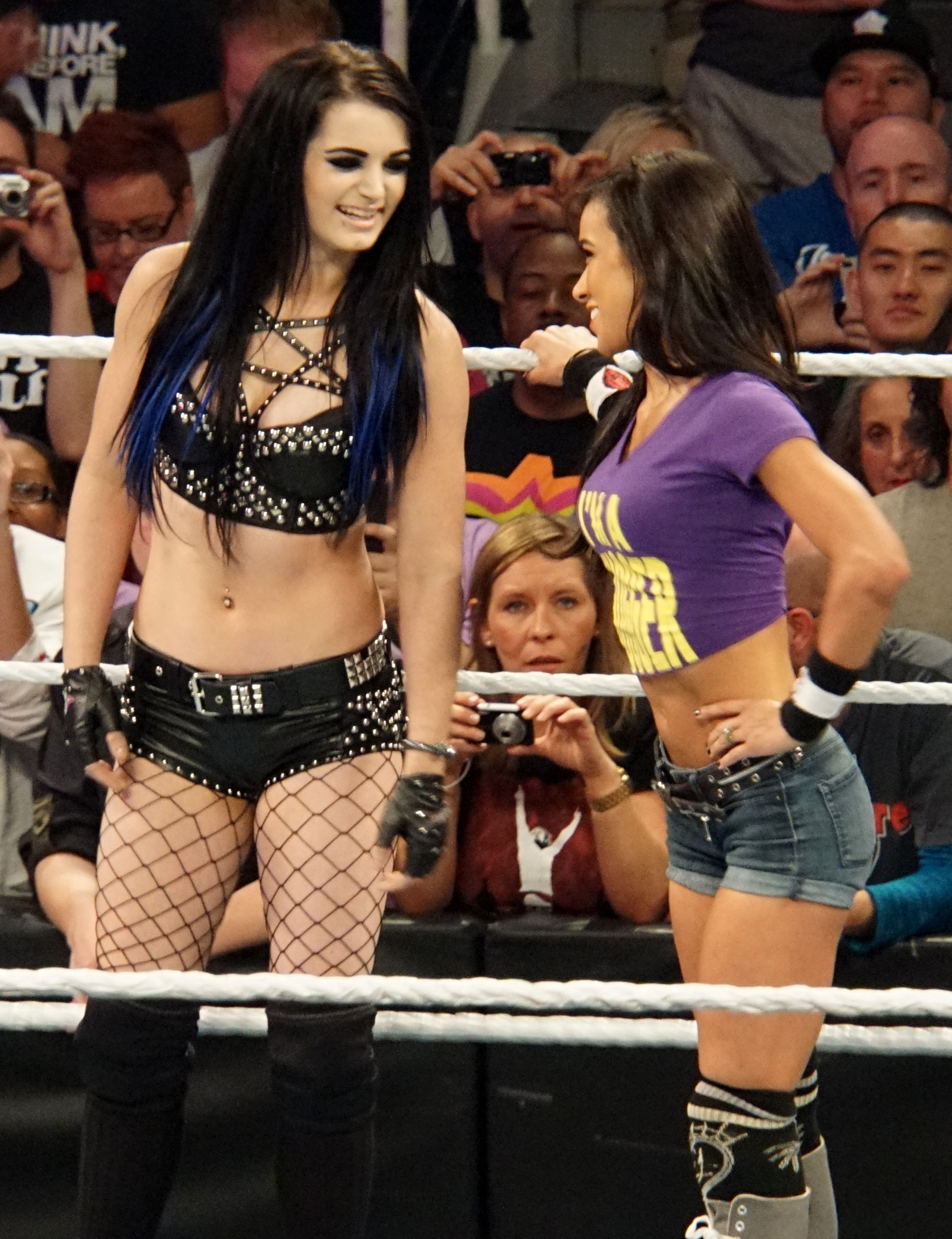
AJ and Paige were rivals throughout 2014 (left) before they allied together in March 2015 (right).

Upon her return on June 30, AJ switched to a face role and was no longer accompanied by Tamina. She challenged Paige to an impromptu rematch and won back the Divas Championship. They started pretending to be best friends in a facetious manner. When AJ retained the title from Paige at Battleground, their act escalated into unprovoked attacks. At SummerSlam on August 17, AJ lost the championship to Paige. Their storyline was then intertwined with that of Nikki and Brie Bella, at the behest of Stephanie McMahon, who granted Nikki a championship opportunity. A triple threat match ensued at Night of Champions on September 21, where AJ became a record-tying three-time Divas Champion. Her feud against Paige concluded with a victory at Hell in a Cell in October. She changed focus to Nikki Bella, whose sister, Brie, was involved as her "personal assistant". AJ quickly lost the championship to Nikki at Survivor Series on November 23, due to a distraction by Brie. After losing the rematch at TLC the following month, Mendez took time off to heal a pre-existing neck injury.

In February 2015, Mendez criticized WWE's treatment of its female wrestlers, stating they receive only a fraction of the wages and screen time of their male counterparts despite having generated record-selling merchandise and several top-rated segments. Her comments addressed WWE executive Stephanie McMahon, who thanked her for the public statement. WWE chairman and CEO Vince McMahon acknowledged the issue.

AJ returned on the March 2 episode of Raw, saving her former rival Paige from an attack by Nikki and Brie Bella. AJ and Paige allied together and defeated the Bella Twins at WrestleMania 31 on March 29. A six-woman tag team match the next night on Raw wound up being her final match, as WWE announced her retirement from in-ring competition on April 3. In her memoir, Mendez said permanent damage to her cervical spine and the fulfillment of her goals led to the decision. She had also "felt caught in the middle" between WWE and her husband CM Punk following his controversial departure in January 2014 but continued to wrestle for as long as she could.

=== Women of Wrestling (2021–2023) ===
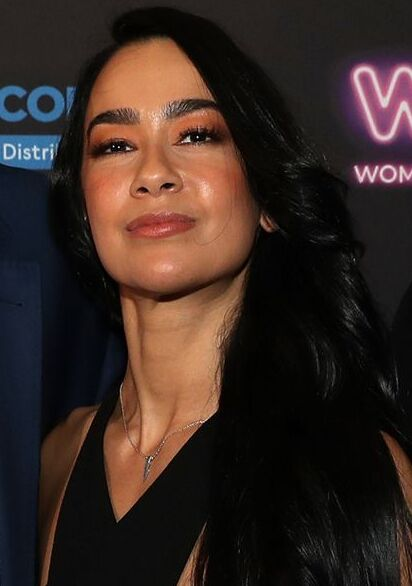
AJ in 2021

After six years away from the wrestling industry, Mendez joined the WOW – Women of Wrestling promotion as an executive producer in October 2021, serving alongside Jeanie Buss. This announcement coincided with WOW entering into a multi-year distribution agreement with ViacomCBS, the biggest distribution opportunity in the U.S. and abroad in the history of women's professional wrestling. Beginning in September 2022, Mendez provided color commentary for WOW's syndicated weekly television program. By August 2023, Mendez said she would be departing WOW at the end of her season-long contract.

=== Return to WWE (2025–present) ===
In a 2021 interview, Mendez said she had healed from the injuries sustained during her career and that she could "technically" return to the ring. Two years later, in November 2023, her husband, CM Punk, returned to WWE after a nearly ten-year hiatus, amplifying speculation that she would also return. By September 2025, as part of his storyline with Seth Rollins, Punk began feuding with Rollins's wife, Becky Lynch, who attacked him on multiple occasions. Unwilling to strike a woman, Punk sought a partner to even the odds. On the September 5 episode of SmackDown, Mendez, again under the ring name AJ Lee, returned to WWE after a decade of absence, and attacked Lynch.

AJ's first return match took place at Wrestlepalooza on September 20, where she and Punk defeated Lynch and Rollins in a mixed tag team match after she forced Lynch to submit. AJ then participated in a five-on-five WarGames match at Survivor Series: WarGames on November 29, again forcing Lynch to submit to secure the win for her team. AJ went on to defeat Lynch at Elimination Chamber on February 28, 2026, to win the Women's Intercontinental Championship. She successfully defended the championship against Bayley on the March 16 episode of Raw, but was defeated by Lynch at WrestleMania 42 – Night 1 on April 18, ending her reign at 49 days. Mendez's return was documented for season three of the Netflix documentary series WWE Unreal, released in July 2026; she revealed that this stint was initially planned to be "the goodbye she never had", but she decided to continue wrestling.

== Professional wrestling persona ==
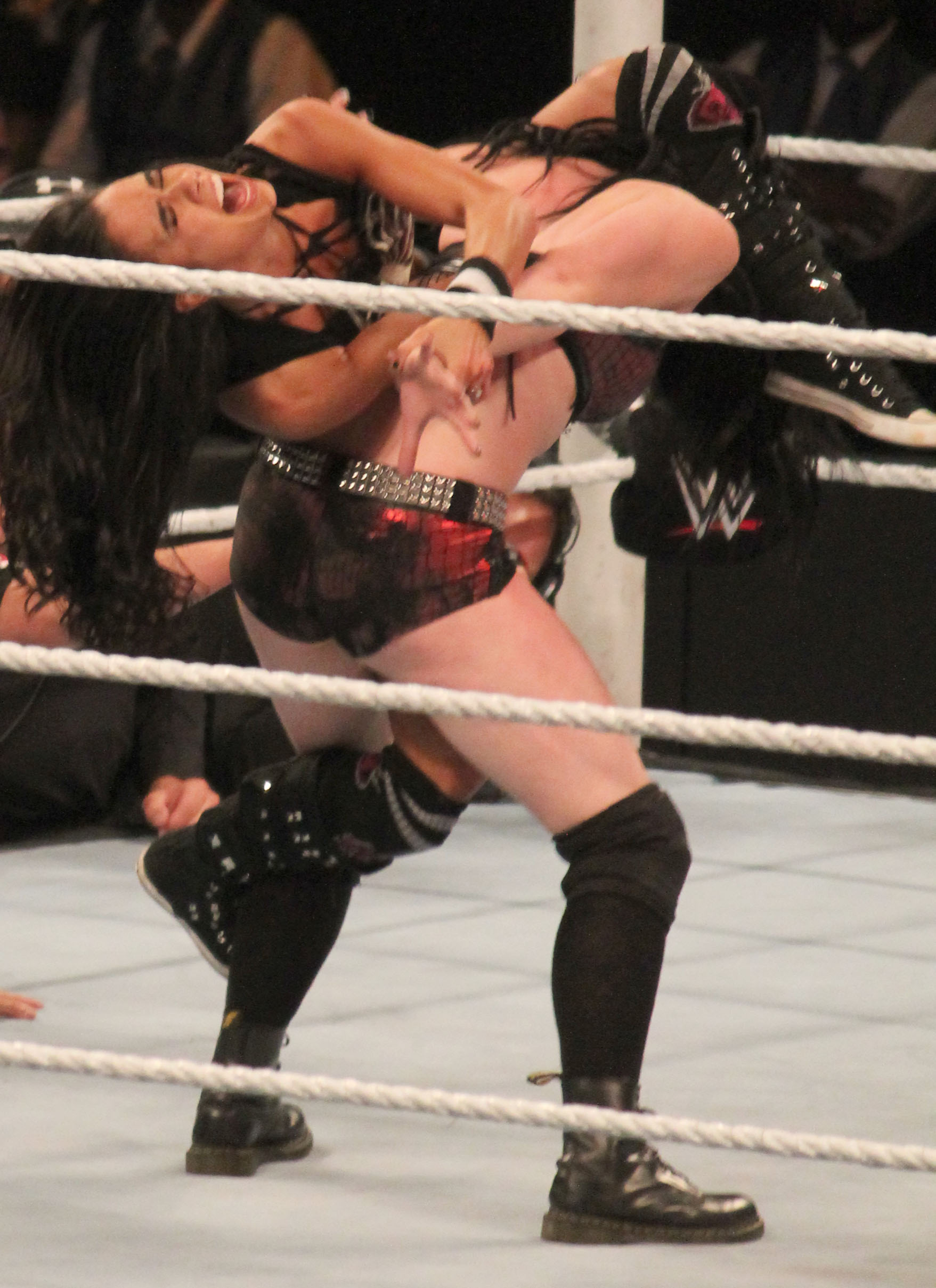
AJ performing her finishing maneuver, the "Black Widow", on Paige

Mendez's character is prominently associated with her mentally unstable gimmick used during her time in WWE. This persona, labeled the "crazy chick", caused Mendez to feel that she "was hiding in plain sight" due to her bipolar disorder. Her diagnosis was not publicly disclosed until the publicity for her memoir, nor was WWE aware of her condition.

The "Lee" in her ring name was derived from Wendee Lee, a voice actress in her favorite anime, Cowboy Bebop. She wore various ring attire styles throughout her career, but settled on a T-shirt, jean shorts, and Chuck Taylor All-Stars, as it reflected her practical style. She also wanted her look to be distinctive and easily replicated for cosplay. When performing, she skips as she enters ringside, and sometimes uses it to taunt an opponent during a match. She primarily performs the octopus hold submission as her finishing maneuver, named "Black Widow" in reference to the Marvel Comics character.

=== Legacy ===
Mendez is regarded as one of WWE's most popular female wrestlers of all time. She was described by Paul Weigle of Pro Wrestling Torch as "a standout of the Divas era due to her charisma, in-ring ability, and status as an anti-Diva". Wrestling performers who have cited Mendez as an inspiration or influence include Bayley, Cathy Kelley, Cora Jade, Julia Hart,, Roxanne Perez, and Zayda Steel. Mendez's WWE character was portrayed by Thea Trinidad in the 2019 biographical film Fighting with My Family, which depicted the life of her rival, Paige, and recreated their first Divas Championship match.

== Writing and advocacy ==
Mendez wrote Crazy Is My Superpower: How I Triumphed by Breaking Bones, Breaking Hearts, and Breaking the Rules, a memoir published by Crown Archetype on April 4, 2017. The book covers her upbringing and career in professional wrestling. It debuted at No. 10 on The New York Times Best Seller list for hardcover non-fiction. Upon release, she described writing as "very much the next chapter" of her life.

Mendez formed a writing partnership with actress Aimee Garcia in 2019. Their first project was the comic book series GLOW vs. The Babyface, based on the television series GLOW; the first of four issues was published by IDW Publishing in November 2019. In 2020, they created the production company Scrappy Heart Productions, dedicated to elevating diverse voices through storytelling. They wrote the Dungeons & Dragons four-issue limited series At the Spine of the World; the first issue was published by IDW in November 2020. Alongside John Swetman, they co-wrote the screenplay for the 2022 Netflix film Blade of the 47 Ronin.

In 2020, Mendez made the Black List's inaugural Latinx TV list for her television pilot script, Home. In June 2021, she wrote a story in the first issue of DC Comics' Wonder Woman: Black and Gold, an anthology mini-series celebrating Wonder Woman's 80th anniversary.

An advocate for mental health awareness and animal welfare, Mendez has served as an ambassador for organizations such as the National Alliance on Mental Illness (NAMI), the Jed Foundation, and the American Society for the Prevention of Cruelty to Animals. In 2018, she was awarded with NAMI's Multicultural Outreach Award.

== Personal life ==
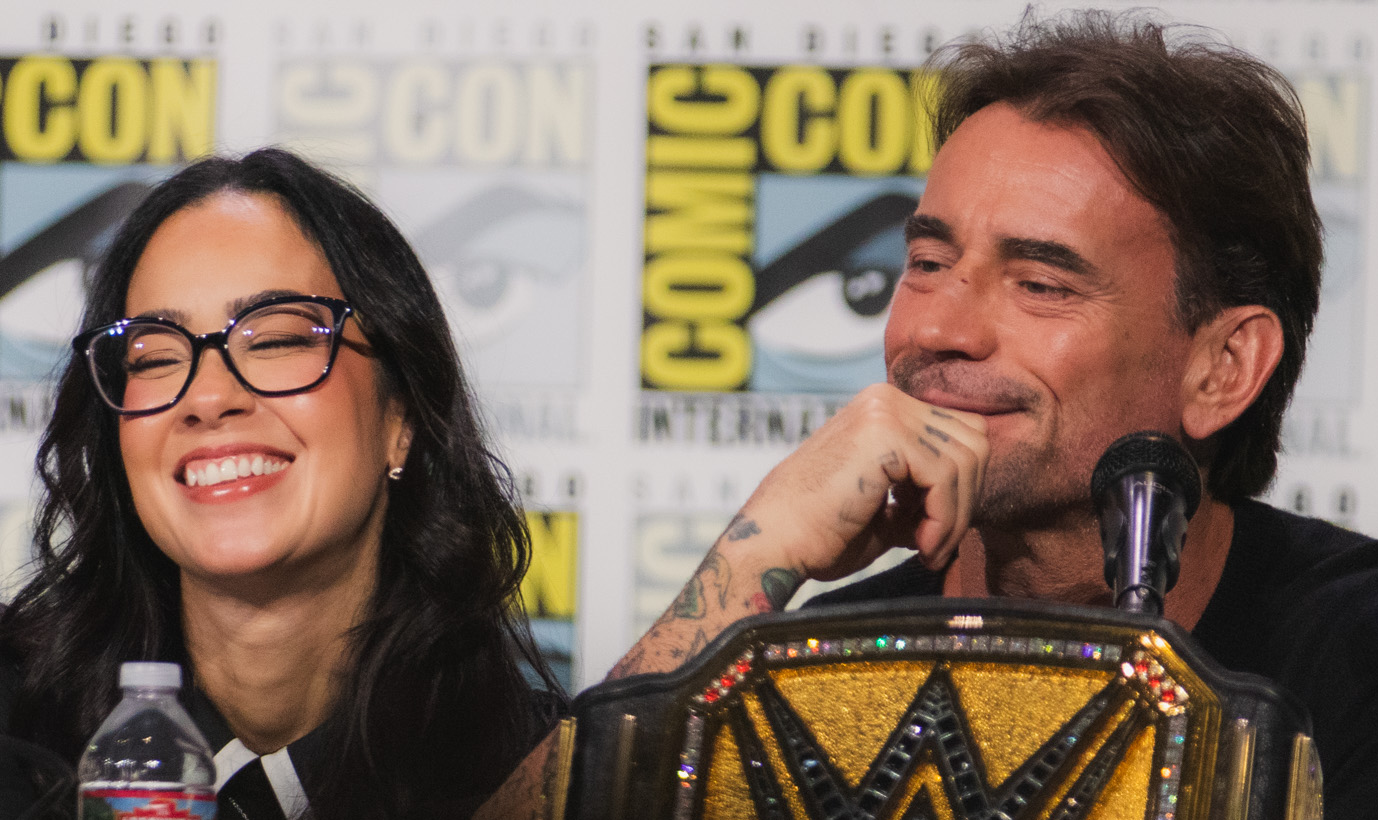
Mendez with her husband CM Punk at San Diego Comic-Con in July 2026.

Mendez regards herself as a tomboy and has an interest in comic books, anime, and video games. She has the numerical date of her first WWE Divas Championship win tattooed in tally marks on the back of her neck.

Mendez began dating fellow WWE wrestler Phillip Brooks, better known as CM Punk, in August 2013, and they married on June 13, 2014. They reside in Los Angeles, California, and Chicago, Illinois.

== Filmography ==
Film and television work
Year	Title	Role	Notes	Ref.
2014	Scooby-Doo! WrestleMania Mystery	AJ Lee (voice)	Direct-to-video film	
2015	Madden: The Movie	Trish	Madden NFL 16 promotional short film	
2016	The Evolution of Punk	Herself	Documentary mini-series	
2019	Rabid	Kira	Film	
2022	Blade of the 47 Ronin	—N/a	Film; co-written with John Swetman and Aimee Garcia	
2023	Heels	Elle Dorado	Television series; recurring role (season 2)	
2024	Sacramento	Arielle	Film	
2025	Aimee Comes First	—N/a	Short film; executive producer	
2026	WWE Unreal	Herself	Documentary television series (season 3)	
2026	It's Complicated	TBA	Short film; post-production	

== Bibliography ==
- Crazy Is My Superpower: How I Triumphed by Breaking Bones, Breaking Hearts, and Breaking the Rules (Crown Archetype, 2017, ISBN 978-0-451-49666-9)
- GLOW vs. The Babyface, with Aimee Garcia, illustrated by Hannah Templer (IDW Publishing, June 2020, ISBN 978-1-68405-630-9)
- Wonder Woman: Black and Gold #1: "Mother's Daughter", illustrated by Ming Doyle (co-feature, DC Comics, June 2021)
- Dungeons & Dragons: At the Spine of the World, with Aimee Garcia, illustrated by Martin Coccolo and Katrina Mae Hao (IDW Publishing, July 2021, ISBN 978-1-68405-791-7)
- Day of the Dead Girl, with Aimee Garcia, illustrated by Belén Culebras (Magma Comix, October 2024)
- East Side Saints, with Aimee Garcia and Ildy Modrovich, illustrated by Amilcar Pinna, colored by Amanda Grazini (Ignition Press, 2027)

== Championships and accomplishments ==
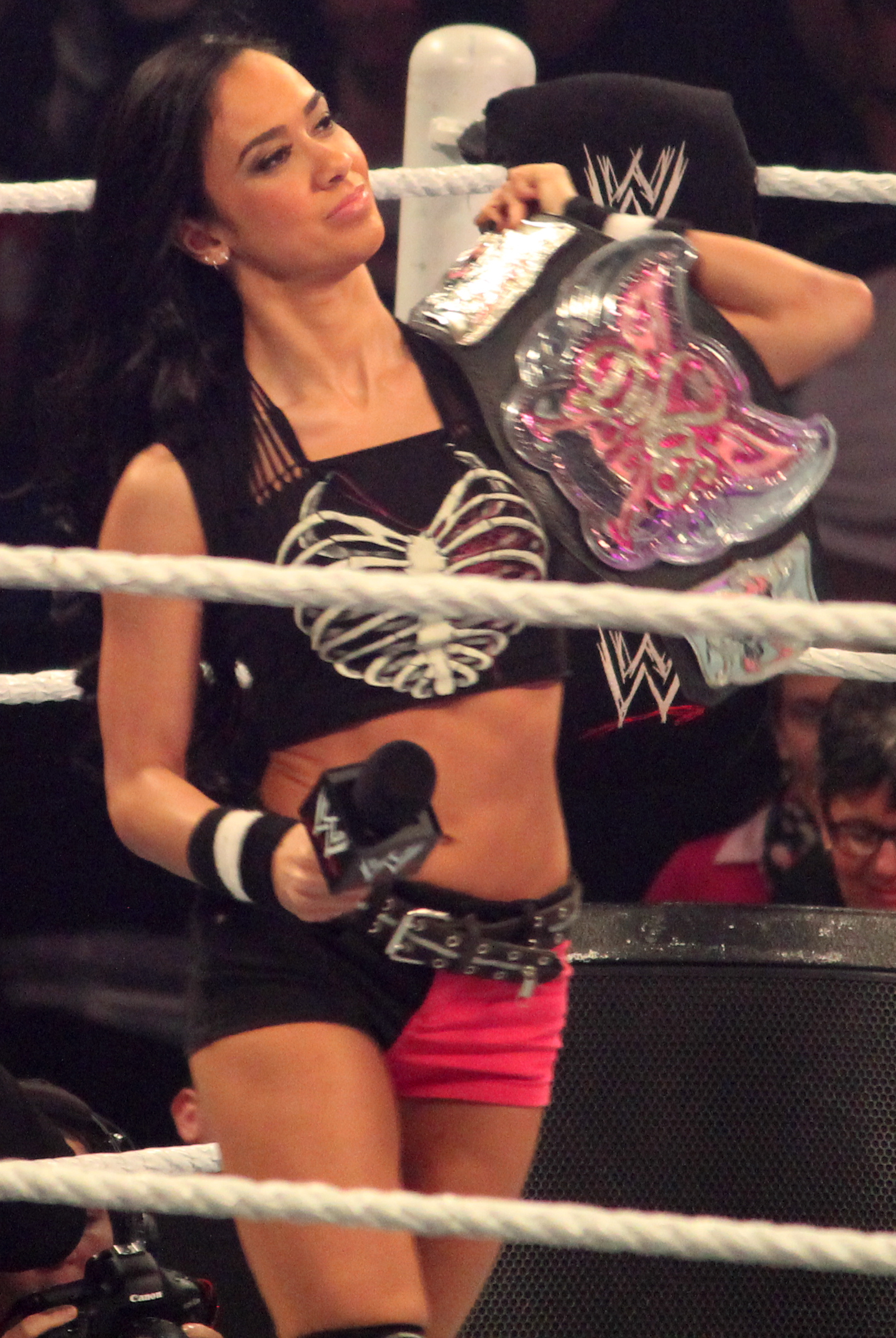
AJ is a record-tying three-time WWE Divas Champion and held the title for an overall record of 406 days.

- Florida Championship Wrestling
  - FCW Divas Championship (1 time)
  - Queen of FCW (1 time)
- Guinness World Records
  - Most wins of the WWE Divas Championship (3 times) tied with Eve Torres
  - First female WWE Superstar Challenge winner (2012)
- Pro Wrestling Illustrated
  - Woman of the Year (2012–2014)
  - Ranked No. 2 of the top 50 female wrestlers in the PWI Female 50 in 2014
- Women Superstars Uncensored
  - WSU Tag Team Championship (1 time) – with Brooke Carter
  - WSU/NWS King and Queen of the Ring (2009) – with Jay Lethal
- Wrestling Observer Newsletter
  - Worst Worked Match of the Year (2013) 14-woman elimination tag team match at Survivor Series
- WWE
  - WWE Divas Championship (3 times)
  - WWE Women's Intercontinental Championship (1 time)
  - Slammy Award (3 times)
    - Diva of the Year (2012, 2014)
    - Kiss of the Year (2012) – with John Cena
- Other awards and honors
  - National Alliance on Mental Illness Multicultural Outreach Award (2018)
