= Payback (2013) =

WWE pay-per-view event

- Promotional poster featuring Randy Orton
- Promotion: WWE
- Date: June 16, 2013
- City: Rosemont, Illinois
- Venue: Allstate Arena
- Attendance: 14,623
- Buy rate: 186,000

Pay-per-view chronology
| ← Previous; Extreme Rules | Next → Money in the Bank |

Payback chronology
| ← Previous; First | Next → 2014 |

The 2013 Payback was a professional wrestling pay-per-view (PPV) event produced by WWE. It was the inaugural Payback and took place on June 16, 2013, at the Allstate Arena in the Chicago suburb of Rosemont, Illinois. The concept of the event was based around wrestlers seeking payback against their opponents.

Eight professional wrestling matches were contested at the event, including one on the Kickoff pre-show. In the main event, John Cena retained the WWE Championship against Ryback in a Three Stages of Hell match. In other prominent matches, Alberto Del Rio defeated Dolph Ziggler to win the World Heavyweight Championship and CM Punk defeated Chris Jericho.

The event received 186,000 pay-per-view buys, down from the previous year's No Way Out pay per view of 194,000. Payback replaced No Way Out for the June 2013 PPV slot, which itself had been reinstated for June 2012 after it was originally discontinued following its 2009 event. This was the only Payback to broadcast exclusively via traditional PPV outlets due to the launch of the WWE Network streaming service in February 2014. It was also the only Payback to feature the previous version of the World Heavyweight Championship, which was unified with the WWE Championship in December.

== Production ==
=== Background ===
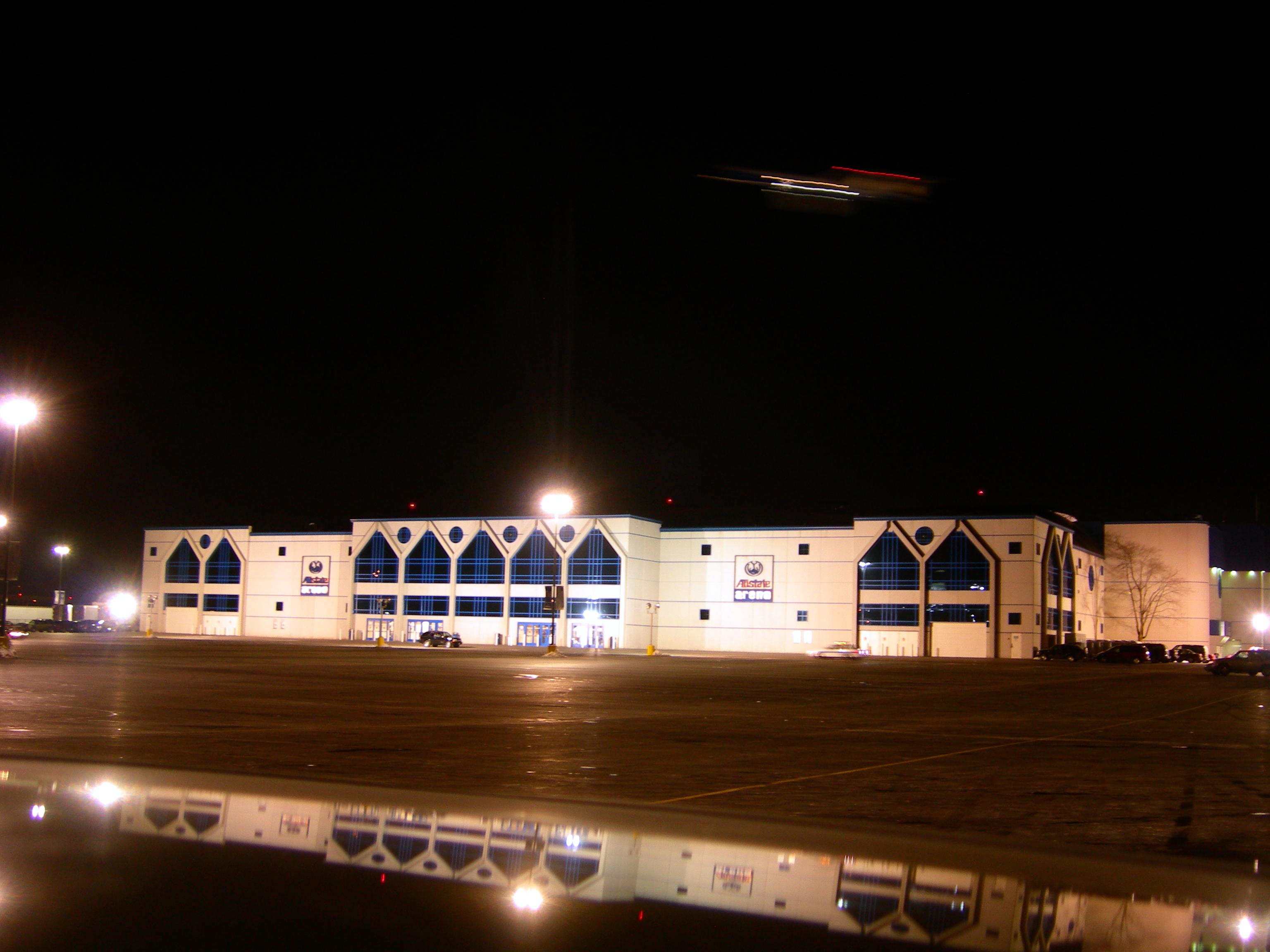
The inaugural Payback was held at the Allstate Arena in the Chicago suburb of Rosemont, Illinois.

In June 2012, WWE reinstated its professional wrestling pay-per-view (PPV) event No Way Out, which was originally held in 1998 before it became the annual February PPV from 2000 to 2009. The following year, however, No Way Out was canceled and replaced by a new event titled Payback, with a concept of wrestlers seeking payback against their opponents. The event was held on June 16, 2013, at the Allstate Arena in the Chicago suburb of Rosemont, Illinois.

=== Storylines ===
The event comprised eight matches, including one on the Kickoff pre-show, that resulted from scripted storylines. Results were predetermined by WWE's writers, while storylines were produced on WWE's weekly television shows, Raw and SmackDown.

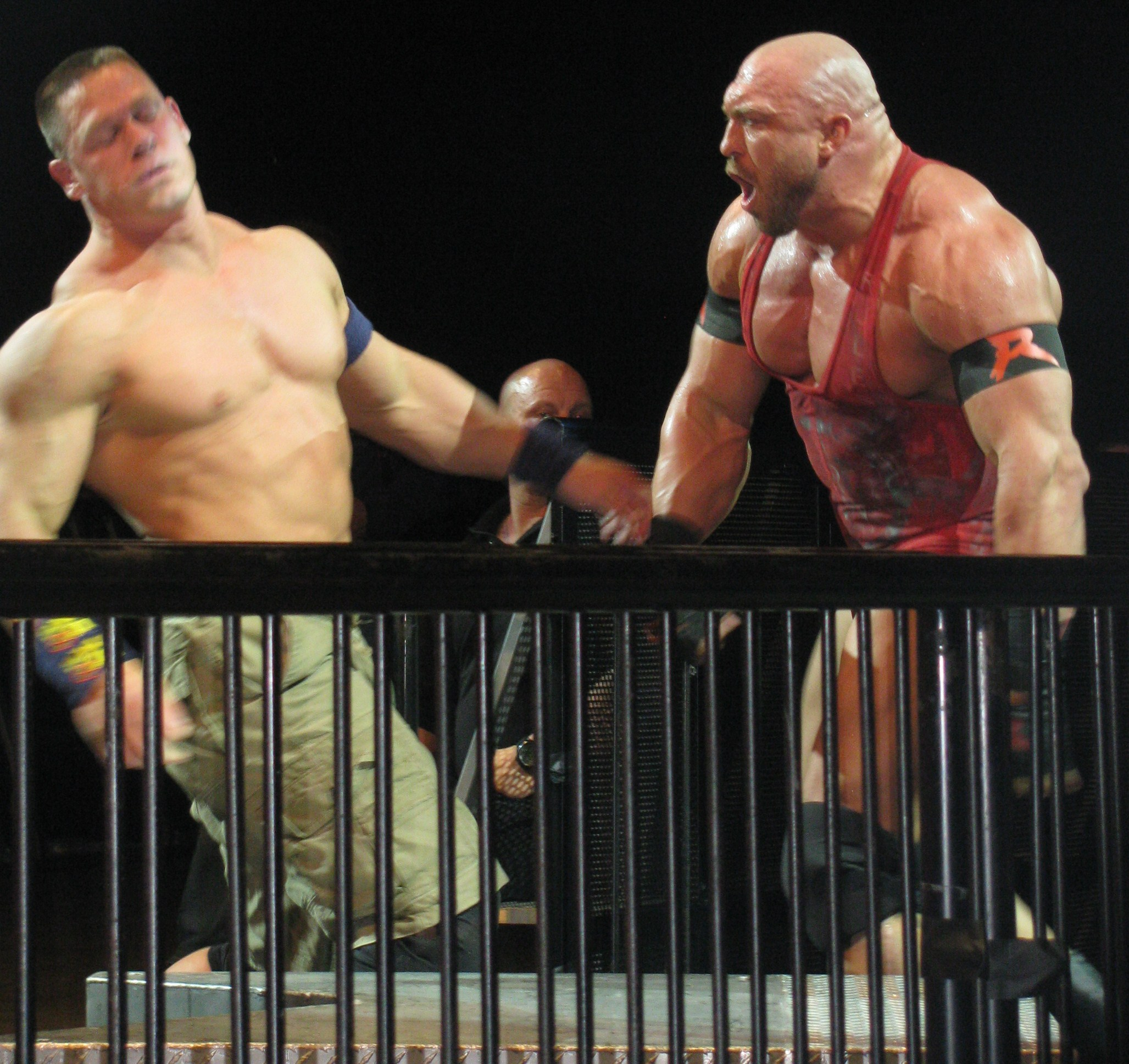
John Cena and Ryback feuded prior to the event.

After their Last Man Standing match at Extreme Rules in May, which ended in no-contest, Ryback drove an ambulance into the arena on the May 20 episode of Raw, challenging John Cena in an Ambulance match for his WWE Championship. A week later on Raw, Cena responded by turning the challenge into Three Stages of Hell, with the first fall being a lumberjack match, the second fall a tables match, and the originally decided Ambulance match as the third fall. Ryback accepted the new stipulation, making the match official.

On the April 22 episode of Raw, AJ Lee won a divas battle royal to face Kaitlyn for the Divas Championship at Payback. The next week on Raw, after a confrontation with AJ, Dolph Ziggler, and Big E Langston backstage, Kaitlyn began receiving gifts from a secret admirer, and a rose bouquet on the May 3 episode of SmackDown. On the June 10 episode of Raw, Kaitlyn's secret admirer was revealed to be Langston, although it turned out to be a mind game AJ planned to get inside Kaitlyn's head before their Divas Title match.

On the May 27 episode of Raw, Chris Jericho hosted "The Highlight Reel" segment with Paul Heyman as his guest, where he inquired the latter about one of his clients, CM Punk's absence from WWE since April and May, and much like in their feud early the previous year, disputed with Heyman on who between the two of them was the "best in the world". To put that argument to rest, Jericho issued a challenge to Punk at Payback, which Heyman subsequently accepted on Punk's behalf. On June 3, 2013, during an episode of Raw, the contract for the match was signed between Jericho and Heyman, again on Punk's behalf. On the June 7 episode of SmackDown, Curtis Axel defeated Jericho after Heyman, Axel's manager, distracted him by playing Punk's theme tune. After the match, Jericho hit Axel with his finishing maneuver, the Codebreaker.

On the April 8 episode of Raw, Alberto Del Rio defeated Jack Swagger and his manager, Zeb Colter in a two-on-one handicap match, and was subjected to a post-match beatdown from the duo, allowing Dolph Ziggler a chance to cash-in his Money in the Bank contract for the World Heavyweight Championship that was held by Del Rio; after a short match, Ziggler pinned Del Rio to win the title for the second time. This started a triangular feud amongst Ziggler, Del Rio (who wanted a rematch for the title as per his championship rematch clause) and Swagger (who claimed to be the number one contender to the title), which was to culminate in a Triple Threat Ladder match for the World Heavyweight Championship at the Extreme Rules pay-per-view on May 19. However, heading into that event, Ziggler suffered a legitimate concussion in a non-title match against Swagger at the May 7 tapings of SmackDown (aired on May 10), thereby preventing him from competing at Extreme Rules. Instead, Del Rio and Swagger faced off each other in an "I Quit" match to decide the number one contender to Ziggler's title, which Del Rio won. Ziggler returned on the June 10 episode of Raw, and announced he would defend his championship against Del Rio at Payback.

On the May 20 episode of SmackDown, Fandango attacked The Miz during an Intercontinental Championship match against the champion Wade Barrett. During a match between Barrett and Fandango, WWE fans voted for Miz to be the special guest referee for the match. Barrett shoved Miz, which caused Miz to intentionally attack Barrett to allow Fandango to pin him, but then Miz proceeded to attack Fandango. As Miz still had his rematch clause from the Raw after WrestleMania 29, he invoked it for Payback, thus setting up a Triple Threat Match between himself, Barrett, and Fandango. On the June 7 episode of SmackDown, Fandango suffered a concussion, therefore he was removed from the triple threat match. It was revealed on the June 10 episode of Raw by Paul Heyman that Fandango would be replaced with his client, Curtis Axel.

Also, on the June 7 episode of SmackDown, Kane had a falling out with Daniel Bryan, leading to the apparent breakup of Team Hell No. Bryan was teamed with Randy Orton to face The Shield's Seth Rollins and Roman Reigns, winning the match by disqualification after Dean Ambrose attacked the two. Meanwhile, Kane faced Ryback, winning by disqualification after Ryback put Kane through a table, sending a message to John Cena. On the June 10 episode of Raw, it was announced by Raw Managing Supervisor Vickie Guerrero that Bryan and Orton would face Rollins and Reigns for the WWE Tag Team Championship, and Kane will face Ambrose for the WWE United States Championship.

== Event ==
Other on-screen personnel
| Role: | Name: |
|---|---|
| English Commentators | Michael Cole |
| English Commentators | Jerry Lawler |
| English Commentators | John "Bradshaw" Layfield |
| Spanish Commentators | Carlos Cabrera |
| Spanish Commentators | Marcelo Rodriguez |
| Backstage interviewer | Renee Young |
| Ring announcers | Lilian Garcia |
| Ring announcers | Justin Roberts |
| Referees | Mike Chioda |
| Referees | Charles Robinson |
| Referees | John Cone |
| Referees | Darrick Moore |
| Referees | Scott Armstrong |
| Referees | Chad Patton |
| Referees | Rod Zapata |
| Pre-show panel | Josh Mathews |
| Pre-show panel | Big Show |
| Pre-show panel | R-Truth |
| Pre-show panel | Cody Rhodes |

=== Pre-show ===
During the Payback Kickoff pre-show, which was the first pre-show for a WWE pay-per-view to use the "Kickoff" name, Sheamus defeated Damien Sandow after a Brogue Kick.

=== Preliminary matches ===
The actual pay-per-view opened with a triple threat match for the Intercontinental Championship involving defending champion Wade Barrett, Curtis Axel and The Miz. Axel won the match after Miz applied the figure-four leglock on Barrett and Axel pinned Barrett to win the title. Axel celebrated his win by looking to the sky and kissing the title, in memory of his father Mr Perfect, a former Intercontinental Champion.

Next, Kaitlyn defended the Divas Championship against AJ Lee. In the end, Kaitlyn stripped AJ of the belt on her jeans and when the referee was distracted, AJ struck Kaitlyn with the belt. Kaitlyn attempted a spear but AJ forced Kaitlyn to submit to the Black Widow to win the title.

After that, The Shield's Dean Ambrose defended the United States Championship against Kane. The match ended when Kane attempted a Chokeslam on Ambrose but Ambrose reversed into a Snap DDT onto the floor. Ambrose retained the title by countout.

In the fourth match, Dolph Ziggler defended the World Heavyweight Championship against Alberto Del Rio. A double turn took place during this match, with Del Rio playing off Ziggler's legitimate concussion by targeting Ziggler's head. In the end, Del Rio performed a Superkick on Ziggler, who was kneeling, to win the title.

In the fifth match, Chris Jericho faced CM Punk. During the match, Punk attempted a GTS but Jericho blocked the move and applied the Walls of Jericho, but Punk escaped from the hold. Jericho performed a Codebreaker on Punk for a near-fall. Punk performed a GTS on Jericho for a near-fall. Punk attempted a Springboard Clothesline on Jericho but Jericho countered into a Codebreaker in mid-air for a near-fall. The match ended when Punk performed the GTS twice on Jericho, and then pinned him for the win.

In the penultimate match, The Shield (Seth Rollins and Roman Reigns) defended the WWE Tag Team Championship against Daniel Bryan and Randy Orton. In the end, Bryan applied the No Lock on Rollins but Reigns broke the hold. Reigns attempted a spear on Bryan but Orton stopped Reigns. Reigns countered an RKO and speared Bryan. Orton executed a RKO on Reigns but Rollins attacked Orton. Rollins performed the Blackout on Bryan to retain the titles.

=== Main event ===
In the main event, John Cena defended the WWE Championship against Ryback in a Three Stages of Hell match. The first fall was a Lumberjack match. Ryback executed Shell Shocked on Cena to win the first fall. The second fall was a Tables match. Cena executed an Attitude Adjustment through a table on Ryback to win the second fall. The third fall was an Ambulance match. Cena executed an Attitude Adjustment through the roof of the Ambulance on Ryback to win the third fall, thus Cena retained the title.

== Aftermath ==
The next night on Raw, John Cena challenged anybody to step forward for a shot at the WWE Championship. Mark Henry returned to seemingly announce his retirement before attacking Cena with a World's Strongest Slam. Later, Mr. McMahon announced that Cena would defend his title against Henry at Money in the Bank.

CM Punk, along with Paul Heyman, came out to challenge Alberto Del Rio to a match the next night on Raw. Afterwards, Punk told Heyman that while he was still a Paul Heyman guy, he did not want Heyman to be at ringside for any more of his matches. Later that night, Punk defeated Del Rio in that match via countout. During the match, Del Rio tried to back away from the match, but Dolph Ziggler attacked him from behind. After that, Brock Lesnar came out and attacked Punk with an F-5.

On the June 21 episode of SmackDown, Alberto Del Rio defeated Chris Jericho via disqualification as Dolph Ziggler assaulted him. Upset that Ziggler interfered, Jericho gave Ziggler a Codebreaker and Del Rio kicked him in the head. It was announced on the June 24 episode of Raw that Del Rio would face Ziggler for the World Heavyweight Championship at Money in the Bank.

Kane was given another shot at the United States Championship against Dean Ambrose. He won via disqualification when Seth Rollins and Roman Reigns interfered, but the title did not change hands.

Daniel Bryan and Randy Orton faced each other in a no disqualification match, but Bryan suffered nerve damage, giving Orton the victory by match stoppage. Afterwards, Bryan got into an argument with Triple H backstage because of Triple H stopping the match. Four days later on SmackDown, the two men faced each other again with Bryan getting the countout victory over Orton. Bryan, however, was dissatisfied with the result. Three days later on Raw, Bryan and Orton faced each other again in a match, but it resulted in a double disqualification, so Vickie Guerrero, with the advice of Triple H, granted the rematch with WWE fans voting on the stipulation. Later in the night, they faced each other in a street fight, with Bryan defeating Orton by submission.

On the next night's Raw, Sheamus faced Team Rhodes Scholars (Cody Rhodes and Damien Sandow) in a two-on-one handicap match, but lost. Four days later on SmackDown, Rhodes faced Sheamus in a losing effort, and after the match, Sandow attacked Sheamus. Three days later on Raw, Sheamus teamed with Christian to defeat Team Rhodes Scholars. On SmackDown, Sheamus defeated Sandow in a Dublin Street Fight.

Christian returned on the June 17 episode of Raw. Four days later on SmackDown, after beating Drew McIntyre, The Shield attacked him, setting up a match between Christian and Dean Ambrose on the June 26 episode of Main Event. Christian won after Seth Rollins and Roman Reigns attacked him, until The Usos saved him. On the June 24 episode of Raw, The Usos won a triple threat tag team match to determine the number one contenders to the WWE Tag Team Championship. Christian and The Usos defeated The Shield on the June 28 episode of SmackDown.

On the June 24 episode of Raw, Chris Jericho and Ryback fought over being left off the card for Money in the Bank, so Vickie Guerrero put them in a match against each other at the PPV.

The feud between AJ Lee and Kaitlyn continued at Money in the Bank, where AJ (with Big E Langston) defeated Kaitlyn (with Layla) to retain the WWE Divas Championship.

Payback returned the following year, becoming an annual PPV for WWE until the 2017 event, which was the final Payback until it was reinstated in 2020. The 2013 event was the only Payback to broadcast exclusively via traditional PPV outlets due to the launch of the WWE Network streaming service in February 2014. It was also the only to feature the previous version of the World Heavyweight Championship, which was unified with the WWE Championship in December at TLC: Tables, Ladders & Chairs; the World Heavyweight Championship was immediately retired while the WWE Championship became known as the WWE World Heavyweight Championship.

== Results ==
| No. | Results | Stipulations | Times |
|---|---|---|---|
| 1^{P} | Sheamus defeated Damien Sandow by pinfall | Singles match | 10:25 |
| 2 | Curtis Axel (with Paul Heyman) defeated Wade Barrett (c) and The Miz by pinfall | Triple threat match for the WWE Intercontinental Championship | 10:34 |
| 3 | AJ Lee (with Big E Langston) defeated Kaitlyn (c) by submission | Singles match for the WWE Divas Championship | 9:52 |
| 4 | Dean Ambrose (c) defeated Kane by countout | Singles match for the WWE United States Championship | 9:33 |
| 5 | Alberto Del Rio (with Ricardo Rodriguez) defeated Dolph Ziggler (c) (with AJ Lee and Big E Langston) by pinfall | Singles match for the World Heavyweight Championship | 13:48 |
| 6 | CM Punk (with Paul Heyman) defeated Chris Jericho by pinfall | Singles match | 21:19 |
| 7 | The Shield (Roman Reigns and Seth Rollins) (c) defeated Daniel Bryan and Randy Orton by pinfall | Tag team match for the WWE Tag Team Championship | 12:08 |
| 8 | John Cena (c) defeated Ryback 2–1 | Three Stages of Hell match for the WWE Championship: Fall 1: Lumberjack match (won by Ryback); Fall 2: Tables match (won by Cena); Fall 3: Ambulance match (won by Cena) | 24:50 |
(c) / – the champion(s) heading into the match; P / – the match was broadcast on the pre-show

Lumberjacks for 3 Stages of Hell match (stage 1): Alex Riley, Antonio Cesaro, Big E Langston, Brodus Clay, Cody Rhodes, Curt Hawkins, Curtis Axel, Damien Sandow, Darren Young, Drew McIntyre, Epico, The Great Khali, Heath Slater, Jey Uso, Jimmy Uso, Jinder Mahal, JTG, Justin Gabriel, Kane, Primo, R-Truth, Sheamus, Sin Cara, The Miz, Ted DiBiase, Tensai, Titus O'Neil, Wade Barrett, Yoshi Tatsu, and Zack Ryder.
