= Bayley and Sasha Banks =

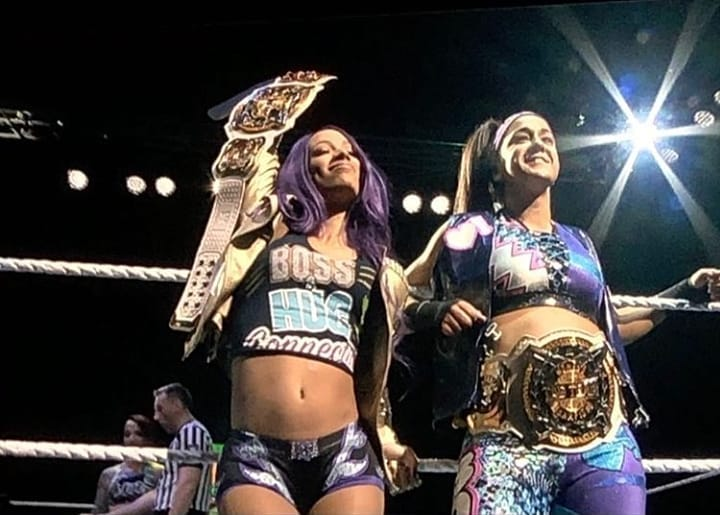
- Sasha Banks (left) and Bayley (right)

Statistics
- Name(s): Bayley and Sasha Banks; The Boss 'n' Hug Connection; Golden Role Models
- Members: Bayley; Sasha Banks
- Billed heights: Bayley: 5 ft 6 in (1.68 m); Sasha Banks: 5 ft 5 in (1.65 m)
- Combined billed weight: 233 lb (106 kg)
- Debut: July 24, 2016
- Disbanded: September 4, 2020
- Years active: 2016–2020

Bayley and Sasha Banks were an American professional wrestling tag team in WWE. They were the inaugural holders of the WWE Women's Tag Team Championship, a title they would hold twice.

Bayley and Banks, who were already known as two of The Four Horsewomen for their impact on women's wrestling in WWE and had occasionally teamed up since 2013, became a tag team at Battleground on July 24, 2016, regularly teaming up in its aftermath on house shows. Although this partnership originally remained mostly off-screen, they eventually started regularly teaming up on Raw in December 2017. From July 2018 to April 2019, they used the team name The Boss 'n' Hug Connection. During this time, they became the inaugural WWE Women's Tag Team Champions at Elimination Chamber in February 2019. From September 2019 to their split-up in September 2020, they performed as heels and simply went by the team name of "Bayley and Sasha Banks". During this time, they gave themselves the nickname The Golden Role Models, thinking of themselves as role models for young girls around the world.

Although they went on a hiatus following their title loss at WrestleMania 35 in April 2019 due to Banks' absence from WWE, they reunited in September shortly after her return, this time as heels. During this run, the duo captured the WWE Women's Tag Team Championship for a record-tying second time. Bayley also won the SmackDown Women's Championship for a second time, of which she would become the longest-reigning champion, while Banks became a record-setting five-time Raw Women's Champion in July 2020 (a record that would be tied and later broken in 2021 by Charlotte Flair). This made them the first tag team or stable to hold all three titles at the same time, making them the only women's champions across both the Raw and SmackDown brands until SummerSlam the following month.

== History ==
=== Feud in NXT (2013–2015) ===
After wrestling on the independent circuit for years, Bayley and Banks both signed with WWE in 2012, before debuting on the NXT brand later that year. Their first occurrence teaming up was on a February 14, 2013 NXT house show in Tampa, Florida, in an unsuccessful effort against Audrey Marie and Charlotte.

The two would only have matches as opponents from May 2013 to 2015, including for the NXT Women's Championship. During that timeframe, the two, together with Charlotte and Becky Lynch, became known as The Four Horsewomen of NXT (and later only "The Four Horsewomen" or "The Four Horsewomen of WWE"), garnering popularity and recognition for elevating women's wrestling in WWE. Banks won the NXT Women's Championship from Charlotte on February 11, 2015, at TakeOver: Rival, in a fatal four-way match also involving Bayley and Lynch. She would keep the title for 192 days before dropping it to Bayley at TakeOver: Brooklyn. After the match, Sasha celebrated with Bayley and former rivals Becky Lynch and Charlotte. The match was highly praised by critics and won Match of the Year at the NXT Year-End Awards. At TakeOver: Respect on October 7, Banks was defeated by Bayley in the main event in the first 30-minute Iron Woman match in WWE history, losing two falls to three in what would be her last match in NXT, as she would soon be drafted to Raw.

=== Occasional team-ups (2016–2018) ===
A year later, while feuding with Charlotte and Dana Brooke, Sasha Banks announced a mystery partner for a match against her rivals at Battleground on July 24, 2016. At the event, the mystery partner was revealed to be Bayley, who teamed with Sasha Banks to defeat Charlotte and Brooke, in what was the duo's first on-screen team-up. Although Bayley was still a member of the NXT roster at the time, she moved to Raw on August 22 after failing to re-capture the NXT Women's Championship at TakeOver: Brooklyn II from Asuka, who had defeated her for the title at TakeOver: Dallas on April 1. She was introduced on Raw by General Manager Mick Foley as the new challenger for Charlotte's Raw Women's Championship. Meanwhile, Bayley and Banks would become regular tag team partners on house shows via a three-way alliance with Alicia Fox which lasted from September 16, 2016, to February 5, 2017, during which the three mostly feuded with Flair, Brooke and Nia Jax in winning efforts. Although the two were still active as a tag team in house shows, this was presented as a mostly off-match alliance on-screen by WWE, although they still occasionally pair up on screen, notably at 2016's Survivor Series event during were both a part of Team Raw in the women's Survivor Series match against Team SmackDown, which they won with Bayley and Charlotte (now renamed Charlotte Flair) as the match's survivors.

On the February 13, 2017 episode of Raw, Bayley defeated Flair for the WWE Raw Women's Championship with the help of Banks, later retaining it in a Fatal-4-Way elimination match against Banks, Flair and Jax at WrestleMania 33. She would eventually lose it to Alexa Bliss at Payback. Banks would then win the title at SummerSlam, only to lose it back to Bliss eight days later on the August 28, 2017 episode of Raw.

At the end of 2017, Banks, Bayley and Mickie James started a feud with the debuting faction Absolution (Paige, Mandy Rose and Sonya Deville), who continuously attacked them. That led to various singles and tag team matches, that were mostly won by Absolution. At the Royal Rumble, Banks was the first entry in the first women's royal rumble match, and she eliminated Vickie Guerrero, Bayley and Trish Stratus, lasting an astounding 54:46, before being eliminated by The Bella Twins. A few weeks later, both Bayley and Banks took part in the first-ever women's Elimination Chamber match at the namesake pay-per-view, during which, after working together during the match, Banks pushed Bayley off a pod to help Alexa Bliss, the eventual winner, eliminate her.

=== Inaugural Women's Tag Team Champions (2018–2019) ===
On the March 26 episode of Raw, after weeks of animosity between the two, including Bayley betraying Banks during their matches, they brawled backstage and had to be separated. Banks and Bayley faced off in mid-April but their match ended in a no-contest after The Riott Squad (Ruby Riott, Sarah Logan, and Liv Morgan) interfered and attacked them both. In the following weeks, Banks competed in different singles and tag team matches in both winning and losing efforts. In June, after she defeated Ruby Riott in the finals of a gauntlet match for the last spot, Banks competed for the first time in her career in a Money in the Bank ladder match, that was ultimately won by Alexa Bliss. Throughout mid-2018, after Banks and Bayley continued to attack each other, they were told to attend counsellor meetings to help maintain their friendship. In July, the two reconciled resumed teaming up, dubbing themselves "The Boss 'n' Hug Connection".

After a short hiatus from the ring due to an undisclosed injury, Banks returned to WWE television in October and took part in the first-ever all women's pay-per-view Evolution, where she teamed with Bayley and Natalya in a winning effort against The Riott Squad. In November, Banks again competed at Survivor Series as part of Team Raw, where she was the last woman from the team that was eliminated by Asuka after an attack by teammate Nia Jax.

On February 17, at the Elimination Chamber, Banks and Bayley won the inaugural WWE Women's Tag Team Championship by lastly eliminating Mandy and Sonya in a six tag team Elimination Chamber match. In their first title defense, Banks and Bayley successfully retained over Jax and Tamina, at Fastlane. At WrestleMania 35, Banks and Bayley lost the championship to The IIconics (Billie Kay and Peyton Royce) in a fatal four-way tag team match after Kay pinned Bayley, ending their reign at 49 days.

=== The Golden Role Models (2019–2020) ===
After WrestleMania, Banks would take a leave from WWE. Although the reason was not addressed by either her or WWE, speculation from dirt sheets emerged that she was looking to quit the company due to her longstanding frustrations with WWE. Banks held the impression that she and Bayley were going to have a long title reign to bring credibility to the Women's Tag Team Championship, with the two allegedly not being informed until the last minute that they would be dropping the titles at WrestleMania. This led Bayley to resume her activities as a singles wrestler, soon being drafted to SmackDown. She would go on to win the Money in the Bank ladder match at the Money in the Bank event, before cashing in against Flair later the same night and defeating her for the WWE SmackDown Women's Championship, which Flair herself had just won from Lynch. This also made Bayley the first-ever Women's Triple Crown Champion and Women's Grand Slam Champion in WWE history.

Banks would return to WWE on the August 12 episode of Raw as a heel, attacking Natalya and donning a new blue hairstyle. On the September 2 episode of Raw, while Banks was attacking her future Clash of Champions opponent Becky Lynch with a chair, Bayley appeared to interfere, only to attack Lynch with the chair herself, turning heel for the first time in her career and reestablishing her tag team with Banks (although they would not use the "Boss 'n' Hug Connection" monicker anymore). As Banks was still on the Raw roster, the duo would appear on both Raw and SmackDown. At Hell in a Cell, Bayley lost the SmackDown Women's Championship to Charlotte Flair, but regained it five days later on SmackDown. On the same night, Banks was drafted to SmackDown, making both part of the same brand again. At Starrcade, the duo competed in a fatal four-way tag team match for the Women's Tag Team Championship, but the match was won by defending champions The Kabuki Warriors (Asuka and Kairi Sane).

In 2020, the team gained significant momentum as the front-runners of the women's division. Continuing to act as heels, they started being referred to as "The Golden Role Models", due to their proclamations of being role models for young girls around the world. At WrestleMania 36, Bayley defended her SmackDown Women's Championship against Banks and three other women in a Fatal 5-Way Elimination match, last pinning Lacey Evans with help from Banks to retain. On the June 5, 2020 episode of SmackDown, Banks and Bayley defeated Alexa Bliss and Nikki Cross, reclaiming the WWE Women's Tag Team Championship for a record-tying second time and making Bayley a double champion. As the Women's Tag Team Titles are defended across all WWE brands, the duo began to compete not only on their home brand of SmackDown, but also on Raw and NXT. During the following months, they defended the Tag Team titles against the likes of Bliss and Cross (SD), The IIconics (Raw), and Tegan Nox and Shotzi Blackheart (NXT). At The Horror Show at Extreme Rules, Bayley retained the SmackDown title against Cross, while Banks challenged Asuka for the Raw Women's Championship in a match which ended with Bayley putting on a referee shirt and counting a cover from Banks before declaring her the winner. Stephanie McMahon, however, proceeded to rule the match as a no contest, meaning Asuka was still officially the champion.

On July 20 (aired July 27), Banks faced Asuka once again for the Raw title, in a match where Asuka could lose the title by disqualification or count-out. During the match, Bayley attacked Asuka's partner Kairi Sane backstage, and Asuka left the match to go help Sane, resulting in Banks winning by count-out and thus winning the Raw Women's Championship for a record-breaking fifth time. With Banks and Bayley concurrently holding the Raw Women's Championship, the SmackDown Women's Championship, and the WWE Women's Tag Team Championship, they became the first tag team in history to hold every women's title on Raw and SmackDown simultaneously, as well as the first tag team since The Two-Man Power Trip (Stone Cold Steve Austin and Triple H) to hold all titles in their respective divisions. At SummerSlam, both Banks and Bayley defended their championships against Asuka. Although Bayley successfully retained the SmackDown Women's Championship, Banks lost the Raw Women's Championship later that night. At the Payback pay-per-view on August 30, Banks and Bayley defended the WWE Women's Tag Team Championship against the newly-formed team of Nia Jax and Shayna Baszler, where they lost the titles.

On the September 4 episode of SmackDown, following a loss to Jax and Baszler in a rematch, Bayley turned on Banks by brutalizing her in the ring, thereby disbanding their team. The two would then feud, culminating in a Hell in a Cell match at the Hell in a Cell pay-per-view, where Banks defeated Bayley to win her first SmackDown Women's Championship, as well as simultaneously becoming WWE's fourth Women's Triple Crown Champion and third Women's Grand Slam Champion. Banks' departure in 2023 ended the chances of a possible reunion, although she debuted in New Japan Pro Wrestling's Wrestle Kingdom 17 event under her Mercedes Moné name.

== Championships and accomplishments ==
Only championships and accomplishments that were achieved while as a tag team are listed. For example, although Sasha Banks is a five-time Raw Women's Champion, only one of those reigns occurred while officially being in a tag team with Bayley.

- Busted open Radio
  - Tag Team of the Year (2020)
- CBS Sports
  - Tag Team of the Year (2020)
- Pro Wrestling Illustrated
  - Ranked No. 3 of the top 50 tag teams in the PWI Tag Team 50 in 2020
  - Ranked Bayley No. 1 of the top 100 female singles wrestlers in the PWI Women's 100 in 2020
  - Ranked Sasha Banks No. 5 of the top 100 female singles wrestlers in the PWI Women's 100 in 2020
  - Tag Team of the Year (2020)
- Sports Illustrated
  - Ranked together as No. 8 of the top 10 women's wrestlers of 2019
- WWE
  - WWE Raw Women's Championship (1 time) – Banks
  - WWE SmackDown Women's Championship (1 time) – Bayley
  - WWE Women's Tag Team Championship (2 times, inaugural)
  - First WWE Women's Triple Crown Champion – Bayley
  - First WWE Women's Grand Slam Champion – Bayley
  - Bumpy Award for Tag Team of the Half-Year (2020)
