= Payback (2015) =

WWE pay-per-view and livestreaming event

- Promotional poster featuring Randy Orton
- Promotion: WWE
- Date: May 17, 2015
- City: Baltimore, Maryland
- Venue: Royal Farms Arena
- Attendance: 10,000
- Buy rate: 54,000 (excluding WWE Network views)

WWE event chronology
← Previous; King of the Ring	Next → NXT TakeOver: Unstoppable

Payback chronology
← Previous; 2014	Next → 2016

The 2015 Payback was a professional wrestling pay-per-view (PPV) and livestreaming event produced by WWE. It was the third annual Payback and took place on May 17, 2015, at the Royal Farms Arena in Baltimore, Maryland, marking the first Payback held outside of the Chicago suburb of Rosemont, Illinois. The concept of the event was based around wrestlers seeking payback against their opponents.

Nine matches were contested at the event, including two on the Kickoff pre-show. In the main event, Seth Rollins defeated Roman Reigns, Dean Ambrose, and Randy Orton in a fatal four-way match to retain the WWE World Heavyweight Championship. In other prominent matches, The New Day (Big E and Kofi Kingston) defeated Cesaro and Tyson Kidd in a two out of three falls match to retain the WWE Tag Team Championship, Bray Wyatt defeated Ryback, and John Cena defeated Rusev in an "I Quit" match to retain the WWE United States Championship. The event had 54,000 pay-per-view buys (excluding WWE Network views), down from the previous year's 67,000 buys.

== Production ==
=== Background ===
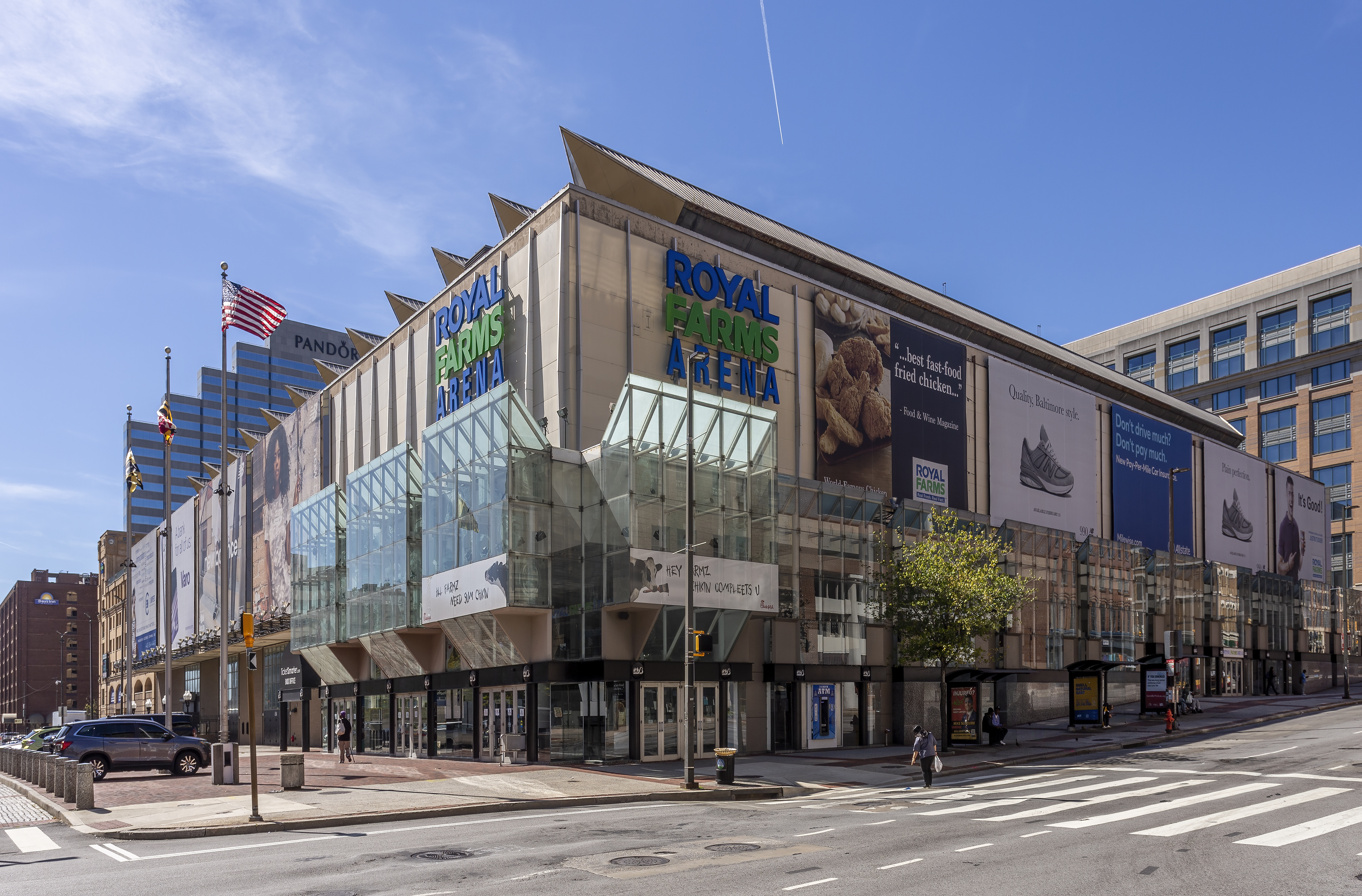
The third annual Payback was held at the Royal Farms Arena in Baltimore, Maryland.

Payback was an annual professional wrestling event that was established by WWE in 2013. It was originally broadcast exclusively via pay-per-view (PPV) before it began simultaneously livestreaming on the WWE Network in 2014. The concept of the event was based around wrestlers seeking payback against their opponents. The third event was held on May 17, 2015, at the Royal Farms Arena in Baltimore, Maryland. Payback was available for free to new subscribers of the WWE Network, as part of a 30-day free trial in over 140 countries.

=== Storylines ===
The event comprised nine matches, including two on the Kickoff pre-show, that resulted from scripted storylines. Results were predetermined by WWE's writers, while storylines were produced on WWE's weekly television shows, Raw and SmackDown.

At Extreme Rules, John Cena retained the United States Championship by defeating Rusev in a Russian Chain match. Later in the event, after consulting with The Authority, Lana stated that Cena would defend the title against Rusev in an "I Quit" match at the event.

At Extreme Rules, Seth Rollins defeated Randy Orton in a Steel Cage match to retain the WWE World Heavyweight Championship after interference from Kane, Jamie Noble, and Joey Mercury. On the April 27 episode of Raw, it was announced that, as a result of a vote on the WWE App, Rollins was scheduled to defend the title against Orton and Roman Reigns in a triple threat match at the event. On the May 4 episode of Raw, Dean Ambrose defeated Rollins in a non-title match, and per the pre-match stipulation, he was added to the match, thus making the match a fatal four-way match. On the May 11 episode of Raw, Triple H decided that if Rollins lost the title, Kane would no longer be the WWE Director of Operations.

On the Extreme Rules Kickoff pre-show, Neville defeated Bad News Barrett. On April 28, Barrett defeated Neville to win the King of the Ring tournament, changing his ring name to King Barrett. On the May 7 episode of SmackDown, Neville and Dolph Ziggler defeated Barrett and Sheamus in a tag team match. On the May 11 episode of Raw, a match between Barrett and Neville was scheduled for the event.

At Extreme Rules, Dolph Ziggler defeated Sheamus in a Kiss Me Arse match. On the May 7 episode of SmackDown, Ziggler and Neville defeated Sheamus and Barrett in a tag team match. On the May 11 episode of Raw, Ziggler was scheduled to face Sheamus at the event.

At Extreme Rules, The New Day (Kofi Kingston and Big E, accompanied by Xavier Woods) defeated Tyson Kidd and Cesaro to win the WWE Tag Team Championship. On the April 30 episode of SmackDown, Kidd and Cesaro defeated The New Day by disqualification in a rematch for the titles. On the May 11 episode of Raw, The New Day were scheduled to defend the titles against Kidd and Cesaro in a two out of three falls tag team match at the event.

On the May 11 episode of Raw, The Ascension (Konnor and Viktor) interrupted a match between Curtis Axel and Damien Sandow, in the guise of Macho Mandow, and attacked both wrestlers, resulting in Axel and Mandow teaming together to attack The Ascension. A match between the two pairs was scheduled for the Payback Kickoff pre-show.

Bray Wyatt began sending messages to Ryback in April. On the April 27 and April 30 episodes of Raw, Wyatt attacked Ryback following the latter's victories over Bo Dallas and Luke Harper, respectively. On the May 11 episode of Raw, Ryback attacked Wyatt. On May 13, a match between the two was scheduled for the event.

Naomi was defeated by Divas Champion, Nikki Bella, at Extreme Rules, and by Nikki's twin sister, Brie Bella, on the April 27 episode of Raw. A week later, a returning Tamina Snuka joined Naomi in an attack on both Bella Twins. On the May 11 episode of Raw, Tamina defeated Brie. On the May 14 episode of SmackDown, a match between the two teams was scheduled for Payback.

== Event ==
Other on-screen personnel
Role:	Name:
English commentators	Michael Cole
English commentators	Jerry Lawler
English commentators	John "Bradshaw" Layfield
Spanish commentators	Carlos Cabrera
Spanish commentators	Marcelo Rodriguez
Backstage interviewers	Tom Phillips
Backstage interviewers	Eden Stiles
Ring announcers	Eden Stiles
Ring announcers	JoJo
Referees	John Cone
Referees	Darrick Moore
Referees	Dan Engler
Referees	Jason Ayers
Pre-show panel	Renee Young
Pre-show panel	Booker T
Pre-show panel	Corey Graves

=== Pre-show ===
During the Payback Kickoff pre-show, R-Truth defeated Stardust after a "Lie Detector". Later, "The Mega Powers" (Macho Mandow and Curtis Axel) faced The Ascension (Konnor and Viktor), which The Ascension won after a "Fall of Man" to Mandow.

=== Preliminary matches ===
The actual pay-per-view opened with Dolph Ziggler facing Sheamus. In the end, Sheamus performed a "Brogue Kick" on Ziggler to win the match.

Next, The New Day (Big E and Kofi Kingston) defended the WWE Tag Team Championship against Tyson Kidd and Cesaro. Kidd and Cesaro won the first fall after Kidd performed a dropkick following a "Cesaro Swing" on Kingston. The New Day won the second fall after performing the "Midnight Hour" on Kidd. The New Day won the third fall after Xavier Woods sneaked in and pinned Cesaro with an inside cradle, meaning The New Day retained the titles.

In the third match, Ryback faced Bray Wyatt. After Ryback collided with an exposed turnbuckle, Wyatt executed "Sister Abigail" on Ryback to win the match.

The fourth match saw John Cena defend the United States Championship against Rusev in an "I Quit" match. At one point during the match, the fight spilled into the crowd, as well as the production area. Rusev eventually applied the "Accolade" on Cena. Cena did not quit, but passed out. Referee Mike Chioda informed Rusev that the match can only end when someone quits, so unlike a submission match, this one continued. Steel steps, a steel barricade, Cena tackling Rusev through the barricade, Cena using a laptop as a weapon, and Rusev using the pyro table for an explosion all came into play during the match. In the end, Cena ended up using the ring ropes for extra torque on the STF he applied on Rusev. Lana then claimed that Rusev was saying "I Quit" in Bulgarian. As Lana was Rusev's manager, the referee obliged and Cena retained the title.

Next, The Bella Twins (Brie Bella and Nikki Bella) faced Naomi and Tamina. The match ended when Naomi executed the "Rear View" on Nikki to get the win.

In the penultimate match, Neville faced King Barrett. In the end, Barrett was intentionally counted out. Following the match, Barrett attacked Neville, including putting on his royal attire, but Neville gave Barrett a German suplex and performed the "Red Arrow" on him.

=== Main event ===
In the main event, Seth Rollins defended the WWE World Heavyweight Championship against Roman Reigns, Dean Ambrose, and Randy Orton in a fatal four-way match. During the match, there was a mini-Shield reunion when Rollins, Reigns, and Ambrose performed their signature triple powerbomb on Orton through a broadcast table. Rollins then wanted the group to reunite, however Reigns and Ambrose attacked him. Kane interfered to aid Rollins. Reigns and Ambrose executed a powerbomb on Kane on top of Rollins, who was on another broadcast table. Reigns and Ambrose performed another powerbomb on Kane sending both Kane and Rollins through the broadcast table. Ambrose and Reigns then started to wrestle each other. Reigns missed two Superman punches, but finally connected the third one on Ambrose. Reigns performed a spear on Ambrose and made a cover, but Rollins broke up the cover. Ambrose performed "Dirty Deeds" on Rollins and made a cover but Kane pulled Ambrose out of the ring, voiding the pinfall at a two count. Kane attacked Ambrose with the steel steps and performed a chokeslam on Reigns onto the steel steps. Orton executed "RKOs" to both Jamie Noble and Joey Mercury, and performed a spike DDT on Rollins. Orton then prepared for an "RKO", but Kane would try to interfere, only to receive an "RKO". Rollins capitalized and executed a "Pedigree" on Orton to retain the title.

== Aftermath ==
During Payback, The New Day (Kofi Kingston, Big E, and Xavier Woods) were scheduled to defend the WWE Tag Team Championship in an Elimination Chamber match at Elimination Chamber. On the following episode of Raw, after Cesaro and Tyson Kidd defeated New Day (Kingston and Big E, with Woods banned from ringside) via disqualification, the teams engaged in a brawl with Los Matadores (Diego, Fernando, and El Torito), The Ascension (Konnor and Viktor), The Lucha Dragons (Kalisto and Sin Cara), and The Prime Time Players (Darren Young and Titus O'Neil), who revealed themselves to be the challengers in addition to Cesaro and Kidd.

On the following episode of Raw, Dean Ambrose challenged WWE World Heavyweight Champion Seth Rollins to a title match, but Rollins refused. Later, Ambrose attacked Rollins until The Authority granted Ambrose a title match at Elimination Chamber.

Also on Raw, Divas Champion Nikki Bella defeated Naomi via disqualification to retain the title after interference from Tamina. Afterwards, Tamina and Naomi attacked Nikki until Paige returned from injury and attacked them. On that week's SmackDown, Naomi and Tamina attacked Paige before Nikki attacked Tamina, Naomi, and Paige. It was then announced that Nikki would defend the Divas Championship against Paige and Naomi in a triple threat match at Elimination Chamber with Tamina banned from ringside. This was the last Payback to feature the Divas Championship as it was retired and replaced by a new WWE Women's Championship during the WrestleMania 32 pre-show in April 2016.

== Results ==
No.	Results	Stipulations	Times
1^{P}	R-Truth defeated Stardust by pinfall	Singles match	6:50
2^{P}	The Ascension (Konnor and Viktor) defeated The Mega Powers (Curtis Axel and Macho Mandow) by pinfall	Tag team match	2:50
3	Sheamus defeated Dolph Ziggler by pinfall	Singles match	12:20
4	The New Day (Big E and Kofi Kingston) (c) (with Xavier Woods) defeated Cesaro and Tyson Kidd (with Natalya) by 2–1	Two out of three falls match for the WWE Tag Team Championship	12:40
5	Bray Wyatt defeated Ryback by pinfall	Singles match	10:54
6	John Cena (c) defeated Rusev (with Lana)	"I Quit" match for the WWE United States Championship	27:58
7	Naomi and Tamina defeated The Bella Twins (Nikki Bella and Brie Bella) by pinfall	Tag team match	6:13
8	Neville defeated King Barrett by countout	Singles match	7:22
9	Seth Rollins (c) (with Jamie Noble and Joey Mercury) defeated Randy Orton, Dean Ambrose, and Roman Reigns by pinfall	Fatal four-way match for the WWE World Heavyweight Championship; Had Rollins lost the title, Kane would have been fired as WWE Director of Operations.	21:06
(c) / – the champion(s) heading into the match; P / – the match was broadcast on the pre-show
