= WWE Payback =

WWE pay-per-view and livestreaming event series

- WWE Payback logo
- Promotions: WWE
- Brands: Raw (2017, 2020, 2023); SmackDown (2020, 2023)
- First event: 2013
- Last event: 2023

WWE Payback was a professional wrestling pay-per-view (PPV) and livestreaming event produced by WWE, a Connecticut-based professional wrestling promotion. It has been broadcast on PPV since its inaugural 2013 event, the WWE Network since 2014, and Peacock for the 2023 event. The concept of the event is the wrestlers seeking payback against their opponents.

The event was established in 2013 and replaced No Way Out in the mid-June slot of WWE's pay-per-view calendar. It continued to be held annually until 2017; in 2015, the event moved up to the May slot, and was then moved to late-April in 2017. To coincide with the WWE brand extension that was reintroduced in mid-2016, the 2017 event was held exclusively for wrestlers from the Raw brand. Payback was then dropped from WWE's PPV calendar for 2018 as following WrestleMania 34 that year, WWE discontinued brand-exclusive PPVs, resulting in the reduction of PPVs produced yearly. The event was then reinstated in 2020, which moved it to late-August right after SummerSlam that year. It was then dropped again but reinstated in 2023 for early September during Labor Day weekend.

== History ==
In 2012, WWE reinstated their No Way Out pay-per-view (PPV), which had previously ran annually from 1999 to 2009. The following year, however, No Way Out was canceled and replaced by a new event called Payback with a concept of wrestlers seeking payback against their opponents. The inaugural Payback event was held on June 16, 2013, at the Allstate Arena in the Chicago suburb of Rosemont, Illinois.

The 2014 event in turn established Payback as an annual event for the promotion. It was also held in June at the same arena and was also the first Payback to air on WWE's livestreaming service, the WWE Network, which had launched earlier that year in February. In 2015 and 2016, the event was held in May. The 2016 event was also promoted as the first PPV of The New Era for WWE. In July 2016, WWE reintroduced the brand extension, dividing the roster between the Raw and SmackDown brands where wrestlers were exclusively assigned to perform. The 2017 event was in turn held exclusively for wrestlers from the Raw brand, and was also moved up to late-April.

The event was expected to return in 2018 as a SmackDown-exclusive event, however, following WrestleMania 34 that year, WWE discontinued brand-exclusive PPVs. As a result, Payback was discontinued due to a reduction in the amount of yearly PPVs produced. Following a three-year hiatus, however, Payback was reinstated in 2020 and held in late August. Due to the COVID-19 pandemic, the 2020 event was held in WWE's bio-secure bubble called the WWE ThunderDome, hosted at the Amway Center in Orlando, Florida. WWE resumed live touring in July 2021, but Payback would take another three-year hiatus before it was reinstated in 2023 for Labor Day weekend on September 2 at the PPG Paints Arena in Pittsburgh, Pennsylvania. This will be the first Payback held on a Saturday, the first held in September, and the first to livestream on Peacock in the United States after the American WWE Network merged under Peacock in March 2021. Payback was not scheduled for 2024 and was replaced by Bash in Berlin.

== Events ==
Raw-branded event

#	Event	Date	City	Venue	Main event	Ref.
1	Payback (2013)	June 16, 2013	Rosemont, Illinois	Allstate Arena	John Cena (c) vs. Ryback in a Three Stages of Hell match for the WWE Championship	
2	Payback (2014)	June 1, 2014	Rosemont, Illinois	Allstate Arena	The Shield (Dean Ambrose, Roman Reigns, and Seth Rollins) vs. Evolution (Batista, Randy Orton, and Triple H) in a No Holds Barred Elimination match	
3	Payback (2015)	May 17, 2015	Baltimore, Maryland	Royal Farms Arena	Seth Rollins (c) vs. Dean Ambrose vs. Randy Orton vs. Roman Reigns in a fatal four-way match for the WWE World Heavyweight Championship	
4	Payback (2016)	May 1, 2016	Rosemont, Illinois	Allstate Arena	Roman Reigns (c) vs. AJ Styles for the WWE World Heavyweight Championship	
5	Payback (2017)	April 30, 2017	San Jose, California	SAP Center	Braun Strowman vs. Roman Reigns	
6	Payback (2020)	August 30, 2020	Orlando, Florida	WWE ThunderDome at Amway Center	"The Fiend" Bray Wyatt (c) vs. Braun Strowman vs. Roman Reigns in a No Holds Barred Triple Threat match for the WWE Universal Championship	
7	Payback (2023)	September 2, 2023	Pittsburgh, Pennsylvania	PPG Paints Arena	Seth "Freakin" Rollins (c) vs. Shinsuke Nakamura for the World Heavyweight Championship	
(c) – refers to the champion(s) heading into the match

== See also ==
- List of WWE pay-per-view and livestreaming supercards
