= Payback (2014) =

WWE pay-per-view and livestreaming event

- Promotional poster featuring Triple H holding his trademark sledgehammer
- Promotion: WWE
- Date: June 1, 2014
- City: Rosemont, Illinois
- Venue: Allstate Arena
- Attendance: 13,311
- Buy rate: 67,000 (excluding WWE Network views)
- Tagline: Payback… it's what's Best for Business!

WWE event chronology
← Previous; NXT TakeOver	Next → Money in the Bank

Payback chronology
← Previous; 2013	Next → 2015

The 2014 Payback was a professional wrestling pay-per-view (PPV) and livestreaming event produced by WWE. It was the second annual Payback and took place on June 1, 2014, at the Allstate Arena in the Chicago suburb of Rosemont, Illinois for the second consecutive year. The concept of the event was based around wrestlers seeking payback against their opponents.

Nine matches were contested at the event, including one on the Kickoff pre-show. In the main event, The Shield (Dean Ambrose, Seth Rollins, and Roman Reigns) defeated Evolution (Triple H, Randy Orton, and Batista) in a No Holds Barred six-man tag team elimination match. In other prominent matches, John Cena defeated Bray Wyatt in a Last Man Standing match and Bad News Barrett defeated Rob Van Dam to retain the WWE Intercontinental Championship.

This was the first Payback event to livestream on the WWE Network, which launched in February. It was also WWE's first PPV event since Armageddon in December 2006 not to feature a men's world championship match on the card. Payback drew 67,000 pay-per-view buys (excluding WWE Network views), down from previous year's 186,000 buys.

== Production ==
=== Background ===
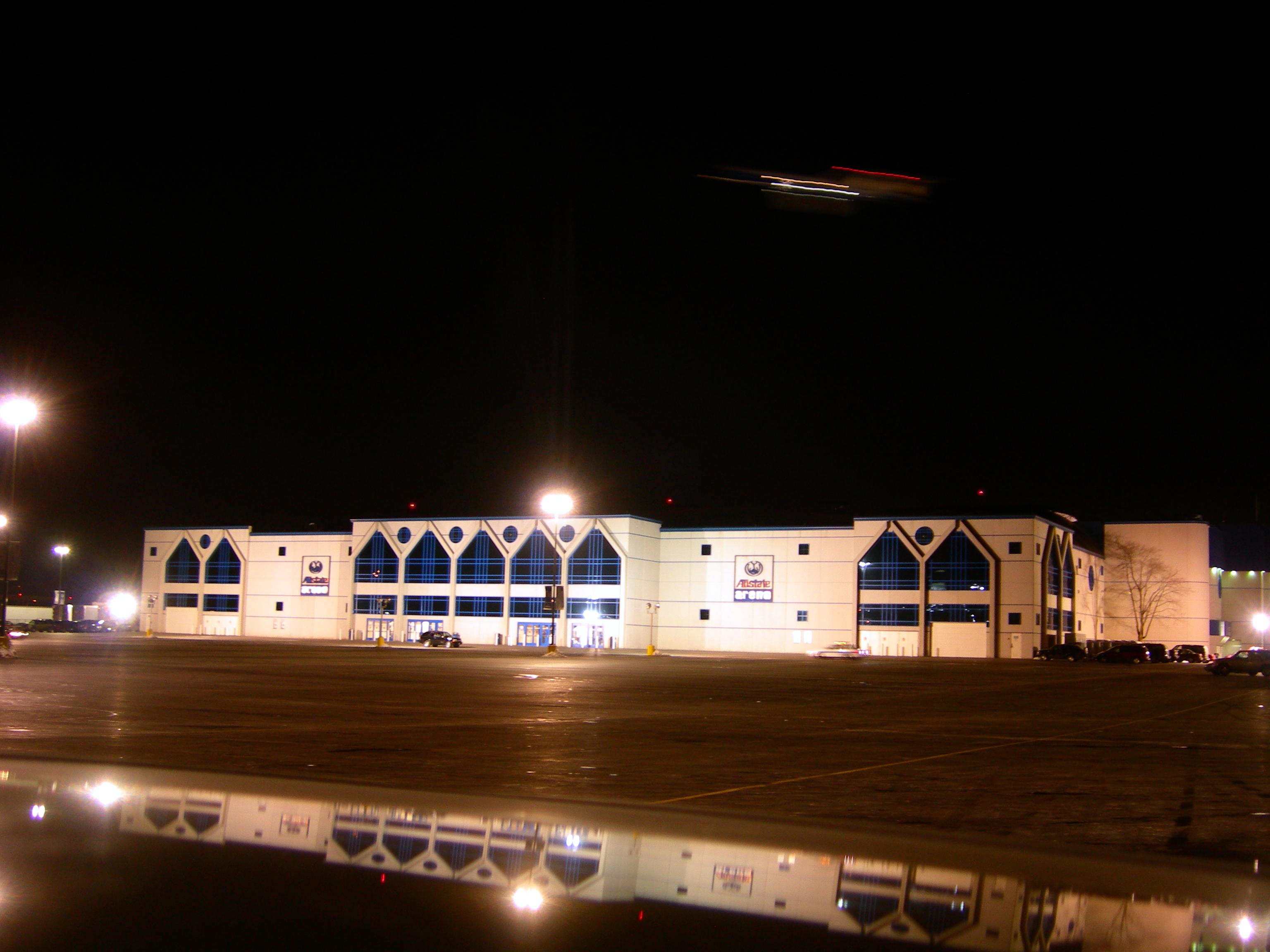
The second annual Payback was held at the Allstate Arena in the Chicago suburb of Rosemont, Illinois for a second consecutive year.

In 2013, WWE held a professional wrestling pay-per-view (PPV) event titled Payback that replaced the previously well-known event, No Way Out. The event's concept was wrestlers seeking payback against their opponents. A second Payback was scheduled for June 1, 2014, at the Allstate Arena in the Chicago suburb of Rosemont, Illinois for the second consecutive year, thus establishing Payback as an annual event. In addition to traditional pay-per-view, it was the first Payback to livestream on the WWE Network, which launched in February.

=== Storylines ===
The event comprised nine matches, including one on the Kickoff pre-show, that resulted from scripted storylines. Results were predetermined by WWE's writers, while storylines were produced on WWE's weekly television shows, Raw and SmackDown.

The main feud heading into the event was between Evolution (Triple H, Randy Orton, and Batista) and The Shield (Dean Ambrose, Seth Rollins, and Roman Reigns). After losing to them at Extreme Rules, Evolution continued to feud with The Shield. The following night on Raw, Triple H forced Ambrose to defend his United States Championship in a 20-man battle royal, which was won by Sheamus. The Shield then fought The Wyatt Family (Bray Wyatt, Luke Harper, and Erick Rowan) later in the night; just as things turned in The Shield's favor, Evolution came out and distracted The Shield, allowing Wyatt to pick up the win for the Wyatt Family by pinning Reigns. Evolution then assaulted The Shield and hit Reigns with The Shield's signature triple power bomb. The following week, The Shield challenged Evolution to a rematch at Payback, which Evolution accepted. It was announced the following week on Raw that the match at Payback would be a No Holds Barred six-man elimination tag team match.

Since costing him title matches at the Royal Rumble and Elimination Chamber, The Wyatt Family (Bray Wyatt, Luke Harper, and Erick Rowan) have been feuding with John Cena. This led to several matches at subsequent events, with Cena defeating Bray Wyatt at WrestleMania XXX in a singles match and Wyatt winning a Steel Cage match at Extreme Rules via escaping from the cage. On the May 12 episode of Raw, Wyatt challenged Cena to a Last Man Standing match, which was accepted by Cena on the May 16 episode of SmackDown.

WWE World Heavyweight Champion Daniel Bryan announced on May 12 that he would have undergo neck surgery later that week. Because of this, Stephanie McMahon suggested that Daniel Bryan would have to surrender the title if he cannot return to action by the pay-per-view where he was originally scheduled to defend against Kane. While his surgery was successful, it was still unknown if Bryan could compete for the title, so McMahon gave him another week to surrender the title. On the May 26 episode of Raw, Bryan stated that while he found no shame in dropping the title due to injury, he did not want to give it to McMahon after everything he had been through. Upset at this, she gave Bryan one more chance to give her the title saying that if he did not surrender the title to her by the pay-per-view, she would fire his wife Brie Bella.

El Torito and Hornswoggle would continue their feud. They previously fought at Extreme Rules in the first ever WeeLC match, which saw Torito defeat Hornswoggle. Hornswoggle put forth a Mask vs. Hair match, wagering his hair against El Torito's mask, which would take place on the Kickoff pre-show.

Paige defended her WWE Divas Championship against Alicia Fox at Payback. The two divas faced each other on the May 12 episode of Raw, which Paige won, and on the May 19 episode of Raw, which Fox won.

Sheamus defended his United States Championship against Cesaro at Payback. The two wrestlers fought to a double countout on the May 13 episode of Main Event. On the May 19 episode of Raw, Cesaro defeated Sheamus in a non-title rematch due to a distraction from Cesaro's manager Paul Heyman, setting up the title match at the pay-per-view.

On the May 19 episode of Raw, there were three beat the clock challenge matches to determine a new number one contender to face Bad News Barrett for the WWE Intercontinental Championship at Payback. The matches were Big E vs. Ryback, Rob Van Dam vs. Alberto Del Rio, and Dolph Ziggler vs. Mark Henry. Big E beat Ryback to set a time of 5:02; Van Dam defeated Del Rio and set a new time of 4:15, and Ziggler and Henry wrestled to a time limit draw. This gave Van Dam the win and the title shot.

On the May 26 episode of Raw, Zack Ryder celebrated Memorial Day by coming out with an American flag before facing Rusev. Rusev defeated Ryder via submission, but refused to let go after the bell rang until Big E came in, eventually knocking Rusev out of the ring. This set up a match between both men at Payback.

== Event ==
Other on-screen personnel
Role:	Name:
English Commentators	Michael Cole
English Commentators	Jerry Lawler
English Commentators	John "Bradshaw" Layfield
Spanish Commentators	Carlos Cabrera
Spanish Commentators	Marcelo Rodriguez
Spanish Commentators	Ricardo Rodriguez
Backstage interviewer	Byron Saxton
Ring announcers	Lilian Garcia
Ring announcers	Justin Roberts
Referees	Charles Robinson
Referees	John Cone
Referees	Darrick Moore
Referees	Ryan Tran
Referees	Chad Patton
Pre-show panel	Josh Mathews
Pre-show panel	Booker T
Pre-show panel	Kofi Kingston
Pre-show panel	Alex Riley

=== Pre-show ===
During the Payback Kickoff pre-show, El Torito defeated Hornswoggle in a Mask vs. Hair match which was followed by El Torito shaving the head of Hornswoggle in a barber's chair at ringside.

=== Preliminary matches ===
The actual pay-per-view opened with Sheamus defending the United States Championship against Cesaro (accompanied by Paul Heyman). In the end, Cesaro performed a Cesaro Swing on Sheamus. As Cesaro went to pin Sheamus, Sheamus pinned Cesaro with a Small Package to retain the title.

Next, Cody Rhodes and Goldust faced Ryback and Curtis Axel. The match ended when Rhodes attempted a Beautiful Disaster Kick on Ryback but Ryback caught Rhodes and executed Shellshocked on Rhodes for the win the match. After the match, Rhodes told Goldust that because they lost a lot of matches together recently, he deserved a better partner and walked out on him.

After that, Rusev (accompanied by Lana) wrestled Big E. Rusev forced Big E to submit to The Accolade to win the match.

In the fourth match, Kofi Kingston faced Bo Dallas. The match was ruled a no-contest after Kane came down to the ring and attacked Kingston with a Chokeslam and a Tombstone Piledriver.

Later, Bad News Barrett defended the Intercontinental Championship against Rob Van Dam. The end came when Van Dam attempted a Split Legged Moonsault but Barrett countered the move by raising his knees. Barrett executed a Bull Hammer to retain the title.

Next was an in-ring segment involving WWE World Heavyweight Champion Daniel Bryan and Stephanie McMahon about Bryan surrendering the championship or his wife Brie Bella would be fired. As Bryan was about to surrender the title, Brie announced that she had quit instead. After McMahon laughed at her, Brie slapped McMahon.

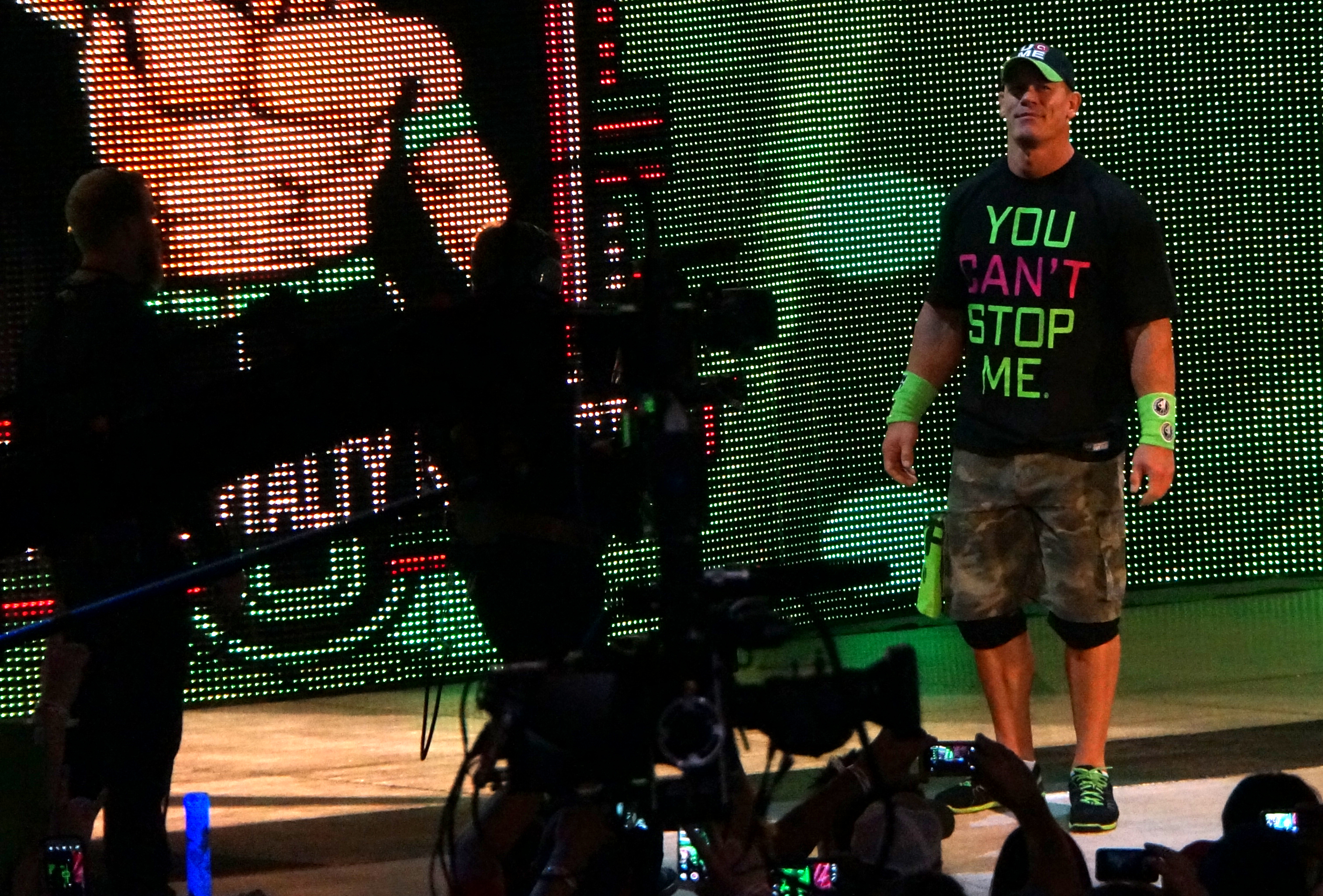
John Cena, who faced Bray Wyatt in a Last Man Standing match

In the next match, John Cena faced Bray Wyatt (accompanied by Luke Harper and Erick Rowan) in a Last Man Standing match. Before the match, WWE Tag Team Champions The Usos (Jey Uso and Jimmy Uso) came out to support Cena and counteract Harper and Rowan of The Wyatt Family. During the match, both men executed their respective finishing moves - Wyatt a Sister Abigail and Cena an Attitude Adjustment - but in both cases, the opponent did not stay down. After Rowan attacked Cena, Harper and Rowan fought with The Usos. After both men attacked the other with a chair, Wyatt performed a Drop Suplex through a table on Cena but Cena beat the count. Cena leapt off the apron but Wyatt caught Cena and executed Sister Abigail, with Cena managing to stand. Cena delivered an Attitude Adjustment to Wyatt but Harper and Rowan came back, attacked Cena and helped Wyatt stand. The Usos came back, attacking Harper and Rowan. Jey put Rowan through a table with a Running Hip Attack, which was followed by Harper putting Jimmy through two tables with a Superplex. Wyatt executed a Running Crossbody through the barricade on Cena, who managed to stand. In the end, Cena executed an Attitude Adjustment through an equipment crate on Wyatt and pushed another crate onto the crate which Wyatt was in. As Wyatt could not stand, Cena won the match. The match would later be named Match of the Year by Pro Wrestling Illustrated.

In the penultimate match, Paige defended the WWE Divas Championship against Alicia Fox. Paige forced Fox to submit to the PTO to retain the title.

=== Main event ===
In the main event, The Shield (Roman Reigns, Seth Rollins, and Dean Ambrose) faced Evolution in a no holds barred six-man tag team elimination match. At the start, Rollins fought with Triple H, Ambrose fought with Orton, and Reigns fought with Batista. Eventually, the two teams fought in the ring. The match descended into a brawl throughout the arena, where Orton attacked Ambrose and Triple H hit Rollins with a TV monitor. Evolution performed a Triple Powerbomb through a broadcast table on Reigns. Ambrose and Rollins fought with Evolution in the entrance way, where Orton executed a Belly-to-Back Suplex through a chair on Ambrose and Triple H executed a Pedigree on Rollins onto a chair. Back in the ring, Batista executed a Spinebuster on Reigns, Evolution hit Reigns with kendo sticks whilst he was incapacitated on the steel steps.

Reigns executed a Superman Punch on Orton, but Triple H hit Reigns with a chair. Evolution fought with The Shield in the entrance way again, where Rollins leapt off the TitanTron onto Evolution. Back in the ring, Rollins attempted a diving knee, Batista countered with a mid-air spear. When he was just about to cover Rollins, Reigns executed a spear on Batista, allowing Rollins to eliminate him. Ambrose hit Orton after Orton attempted a second-rope DDT on Reigns with a chair and executed Dirty Deeds onto the chair to eliminate him. Triple H hit a low blow on Ambrose and attempted a Pedigree but Reigns executed a Superman Punch on Triple H. Batista executed a Spear on Reigns and Orton passed Triple H his sledgehammer. Triple H hit Ambrose with the sledgehammer and attempted to hit Reigns with the sledgehammer but Rollins executed a springboard high knee on Triple H. Reigns executed a spear on Triple H to eliminate him and win the match for The Shield with a clean sweep.

== Aftermath ==
On the June 2 episode of Raw, Stephanie McMahon announced that Daniel Bryan would defend his WWE World Heavyweight Championship against Kane in a stretcher match if he was able to compete. If Bryan was not able to compete, he would be stripped of the title, and the Money in the Bank ladder match at the titular pay-per-view would be for the vacated WWE World Heavyweight Championship. However, Bryan was officially stripped of the title on the June 9 episode of Raw.

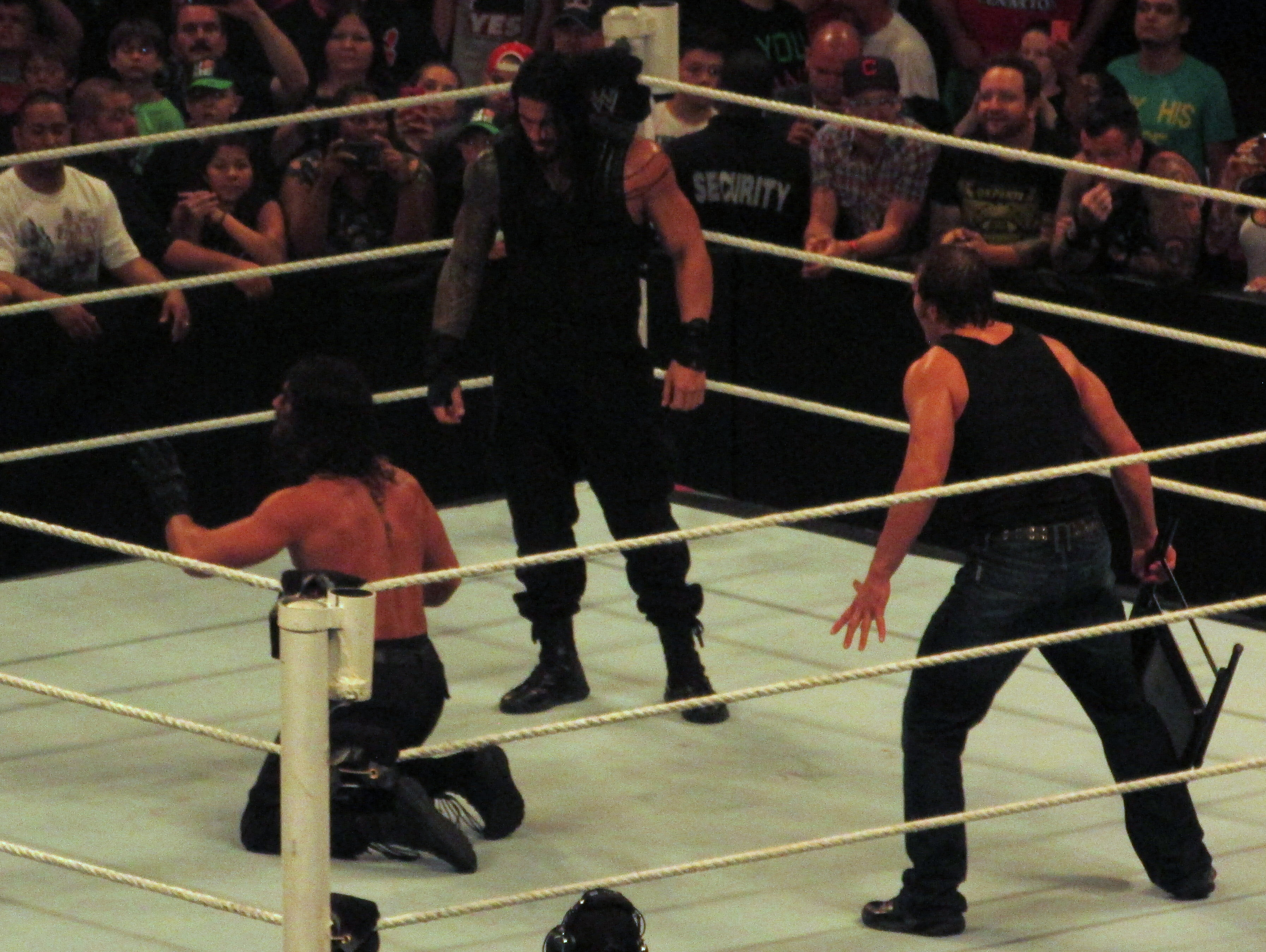
Seth Rollins, on his knees, being confronted by his former Shield teammates Dean Ambrose and Roman Reigns after he betrayed them.

While Evolution was in the ring addressing that their loss to The Shield was not the end of their feud, Batista interrupted Triple H, demanding the one-on-one WWE World Heavyweight Championship match which he earned at the Royal Rumble. After Triple H explained that Batista cannot have a title shot that night due to Bryan's injury, Batista announced his resignation and left the ring. Later that night, Triple H and Randy Orton confronted The Shield, with Triple H announcing that their loss at Payback was "Plan A", and that he had a "Plan B". Without warning, Seth Rollins attacked Dean Ambrose and Roman Reigns with a steel chair, turning his back on The Shield and aligning himself with The Authority.

Bo Dallas took on Kofi Kingston in a rematch. Dallas ended up defeating Kingston continuing his undefeated streak.

The next night on Raw, Cody Rhodes choose Sin Cara as the new partner for Goldust and the two took on Curtis Axel and Ryback. Sin Cara and Goldust ended up losing and Rhodes, who was watching the match backstage, had a disappointed look on his face. He then proceeded to choose R-Truth next week on Raw and finally as a new persona called Stardust. On June 27, a rematch pitting Gold and Stardust against Ryback and Axel was scheduled for Money in the Bank.

Big E and Rusev also continued their feud, leading to a rematch at Money in the Bank.

== Results ==
No.	Results	Stipulations	Times
1^{P}	El Torito (with Diego and Fernando) defeated Hornswoggle (with Drew McIntyre, Heath Slater, and Jinder Mahal) by pinfall	Mask vs. Hair match	7:10
2	Sheamus (c) defeated Cesaro (with Paul Heyman) by pinfall	Singles match for the WWE United States Championship	11:38
3	RybAxel (Curtis Axel and Ryback) defeated Cody Rhodes and Goldust by pinfall	Tag team match	7:49
4	Rusev (with Lana) defeated Big E by submission	Singles match	3:40
5	Bo Dallas vs. Kofi Kingston ended in a no contest	Singles match	0:32
6	Bad News Barrett (c) defeated Rob Van Dam by pinfall	Singles match for the WWE Intercontinental Championship	9:32
7	John Cena (with Jey Uso and Jimmy Uso) defeated Bray Wyatt (with Erick Rowan and Luke Harper)	Last Man Standing match	24:24
8	Paige (c) defeated Alicia Fox by submission	Singles match for the WWE Divas Championship	6:37
9	The Shield (Dean Ambrose, Roman Reigns, and Seth Rollins) defeated Evolution (Batista, Randy Orton, and Triple H)	No Holds Barred Elimination match	30:56
(c) / – the champion(s) heading into the match; P / – the match was broadcast on the pre-show

=== No Holds Barred six-man elimination tag team match ===
Elimination	Wrestler	Team	Eliminated by	Elimination move	Times
1	Batista	Evolution	Seth Rollins	Pinned after a Spear from Reigns	27:32
2	Randy Orton	Evolution	Dean Ambrose	Pinned after a Dirty Deeds on a chair	28:37
3	Triple H	Evolution	Roman Reigns	Pinned after a Diving high knee from Rollins and a Spear by Reigns	30:56
Winner(s):	The Shield (clean sweep)		—N/a		30:56
