= Payback (2023) =

WWE premium live event

- Promotional poster featuring The Judgment Day ("Dirty" Dominik Mysterio, Rhea Ripley, Damian Priest, and Finn Bálor)
- Promotion: WWE
- Brand(s): Raw; SmackDown
- Date: September 2, 2023
- City: Pittsburgh, Pennsylvania
- Venue: PPG Paints Arena
- Attendance: 14,584

WWE event chronology
| ← Previous; SummerSlam | Next → NXT No Mercy |

Payback chronology
| ← Previous; 2020 | Next → Final |

The 2023 Payback was a professional wrestling premium live event (PLE) produced by WWE, held for wrestlers from the promotion's main roster brands, Raw and SmackDown. It was the seventh and final Payback and took place during Labor Day weekend on Saturday, September 2, 2023, at the PPG Paints Arena in Pittsburgh, Pennsylvania. The concept of the event was based around wrestlers seeking payback against their opponents. John Cena served as the host of the event.

This was the first Payback held since 2020 as well as the final as no further events have been held since. It was also the first to take place on a Saturday and in September, as well as WWE's first major event held following the deaths of Terry Funk and Bray Wyatt. This was also the first Payback to be branded as a "premium live event", a term the company introduced at the start of 2022 to refer to its events airing on traditional pay-per-view and via WWE's livestreaming platforms. This would be the first and only Payback to livestream on Peacock in the United States, SonyLIV in India, Disney+ Hotstar in Indonesia, Disney+ in the Philippines, and Binge in Australia. This was also WWE's first PLE held in Pittsburgh since Extreme Rules in July 2018, which was at the same arena. This would also be WWE's final PLE in which the company was still owned and controlled by the McMahon family before WWE's sale to Endeavor was finalized on September 12, 2023, with WWE and Ultimate Fighting Championship subsequently merging to become divisions of a new entity called TKO Group Holdings.

Six matches were contested at the event. In the main event, Seth "Freakin" Rollins defeated Shinsuke Nakamura to retain Raw's World Heavyweight Championship. In other prominent matches, Rhea Ripley defeated Raquel Rodriguez to retain Raw's Women's World Championship and SmackDown's LA Knight defeated Raw's The Miz in which John Cena served as special guest referee. The event also featured the return of Jey Uso, who had "quit" WWE a few weeks before the event and was transferred to the Raw roster upon his return.

== Production ==
=== Background ===
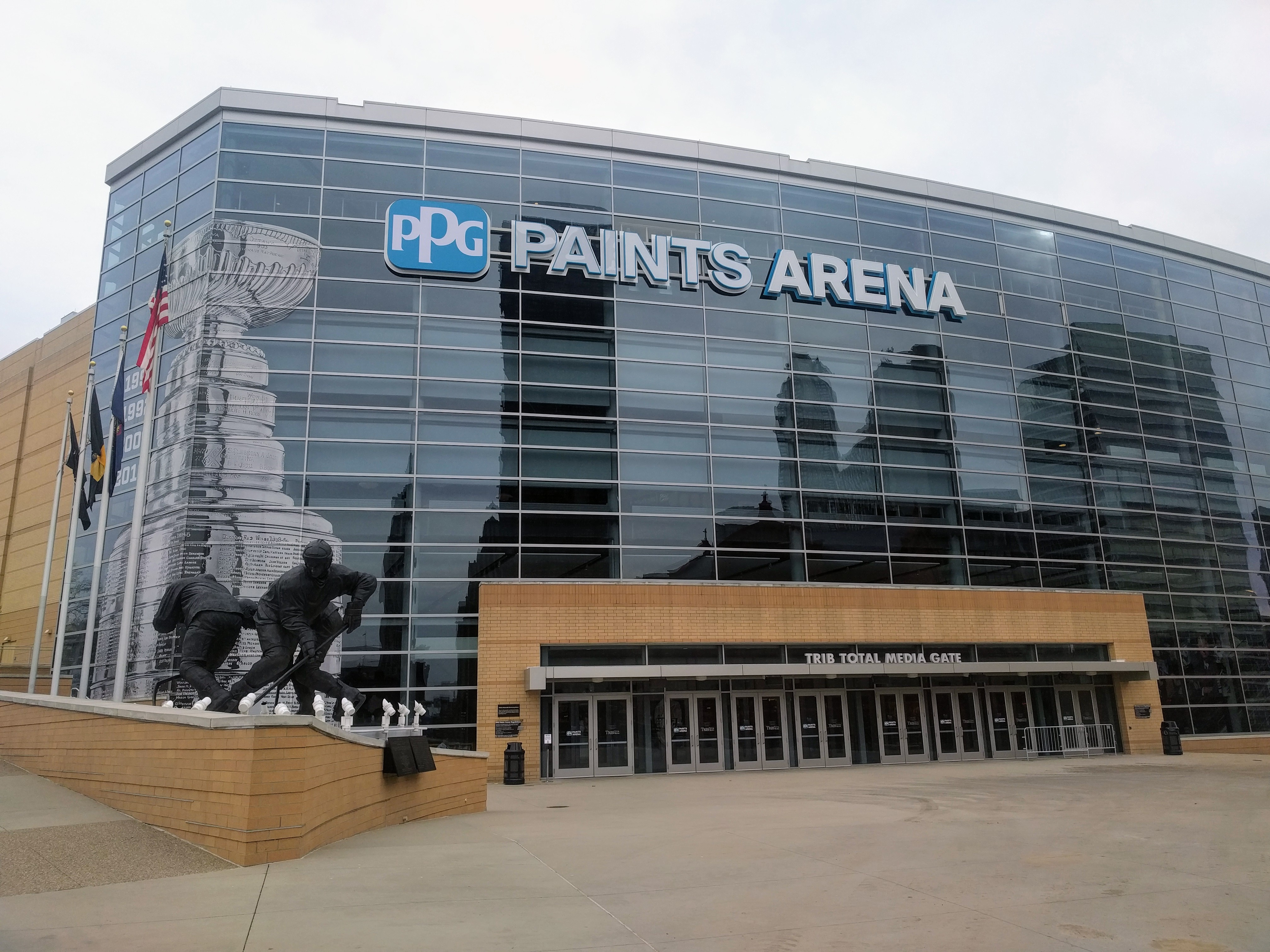
The seventh and final Payback was held at the PPG Paints Arena in Pittsburgh, Pennsylvania.

Payback was a professional wrestling premium live event (PLE) that was established by WWE in 2013. It was originally broadcast exclusively via pay-per-view (PPV) before it began simultaneously livestreaming on the WWE Network in 2014. The concept of the event was based around wrestlers seeking payback against their opponents. The event ran annually from 2013 to 2017 with one further event held in 2020 before it was discontinued.

On June 16, 2023, WWE announced it would be reinstating Payback. The seventh Payback was scheduled for Labor Day weekend on Saturday, September 2, 2023, at the PPG Paints Arena in Pittsburgh, Pennsylvania and feature wrestlers from the Raw and SmackDown brand divisions. This was subsequently the first Payback held on a Saturday and in September. It was also WWE's first PLE held in Pittsburgh since Extreme Rules in July 2018, which was at the same arena. Tickets went on sale on June 27 via Ticketmaster. The day before Payback, it was revealed that John Cena would serve as the host for the event. This was the first Payback to be branded as a "premium live event", a term the company introduced on January 1, 2022, to refer to its events that are available on pay-per-view (PPV) and via livestreaming.

=== Broadcast outlets ===
The PLE was broadcast on traditional PPV outlets worldwide. It was also available to livestream on Peacock in the United States, SonyLIV in India, Disney+ Hotstar in Indonesia, Disney+ in the Philippines, Binge in Australia, and the WWE Network everywhere else. This marked the first Payback to air on SonyLIV, Peacock, Disney+ Hotstar, Disney+, and Binge, after those countries' respective versions of the WWE Network merged under those services in February 2021, April 2021, January 2022, November 2022, and January 2023, respectively.

=== Storylines ===
The card comprised six matches that resulted from scripted storylines. Results were predetermined by WWE's writers on the Raw and SmackDown brands, while storylines were produced on WWE's weekly television shows, Monday Night Raw and Friday Night SmackDown.

At Night of Champions, Trish Stratus defeated Becky Lynch thanks to interference from Zoey Stark, who was later revealed as Stratus's protégé. They continued to feud, with the three qualifying for the women's Money in the Bank ladder match, but none were victorious, although Stratus legitimately broke her nose during the match thanks to Lynch. Stratus then denied Lynch's challenge to fight her, claiming she was not medically cleared. Stark instead faced and defeated Lynch on the July 10 episode of Raw. The following week, Stratus said she would accept Lynch's challenge if Lynch could defeat Stark in a match on the July 24 episode, but if Lynch failed, she would have to get down on her knees, thank Stratus, and get "Thank You Trish" tattooed on her chest. Lynch won, setting up a rematch on the next episode that quickly ended in a disqualification win for Lynch after Stark interfered. Later, WWE official Adam Pearce scheduled a rematch for the August 14 episode with Stark banned from ringside, but it ended in a double countout and the two brawled throughout the arena with Stark helping Stratus. Later, Pearce announced another rematch, this time as a Steel Cage match, which was scheduled for Payback.

On the August 7 episode of Raw, Seth "Freakin" Rollins accepted Shinsuke Nakamura's offer to be on his team in a six-man tag team match that night. Their team won, but during the celebration, Nakamura attacked Rollins with a Kinshasa, turning heel. The following week, Nakamura stated that he wanted the World Heavyweight Championship, prompting Rollins to come to the ring, saying that he would face Nakamura at anytime with the title on the line. The two then shook hands, but Nakamura feigned leaving and again attacked Rollins with the Kinshasa. On the next episode, Rollins was scheduled to defend the World Heavyweight Championship against Nakamura at Payback.

On the June 19 episode of Raw, Raquel Rodriguez took issue with Women's World Champion Rhea Ripley assaulting Natalya before their match. Also during this time, Rodriguez and Liv Morgan won the WWE Women's Tag Team Championship. Ripley continued her post-match assaults on Natalya, which eventually led to a brawl between Ripley, Rodriguez, and Morgan on the July 17 episode where Ripley injured Rodriguez's left knee. This attack subsequently cost Rodriguez and Morgan the Women's Tag Team Championship in a match later that night. After Morgan attacked Ripley later that night, a non-title match between the two was scheduled for the next week's episode, however, Ripley viciously attacked Morgan, injuring her arm, thus the match never happened. On the next episode, Rodriguez returned and brawled with Ripley, only to once again get injured. Later that night, WWE official Adam Pearce stated that Rodriguez was not medically cleared to compete, however, he said that once she was cleared, she would get a match against Ripley. On the August 21 episode, Rodriguez attacked Ripley and announced that she was medically cleared and that Pearce scheduled Ripley to defend the Women's World Championship against Rodriguez at Payback.

On the July 28 episode of SmackDown, Santos Escobar faced fellow Latino World Order (LWO) stablemate Rey Mysterio in the finals of the United States Championship Invitational tournament to earn a title match against Austin Theory. Mysterio was injured during the match, thus Escobar was named the winner via referee stoppage. The championship match was to occur on the August 11 episode, however, Theory attacked Escobar before the match, rendering him unable to compete. WWE official Adam Pearce then allowed Mysterio to take Escobar's place and face Theory for the title, which Mysterio won. The following week, Theory demanded Mysterio to give back the championship as he was not supposed to be in the match, however, Pearce instead scheduled a number one contender's match that Theory won. On the August 25 episode, the rematch was scheduled for Payback.

During the August 25 episode of SmackDown, it was announced that at Payback, SmackDown's Grayson Waller would have a special edition of his talk show, "The Grayson Waller Effect", with special guest, Raw's Cody Rhodes.

At SummerSlam, SmackDown's LA Knight won the Slim Jim SummerSlam Battle Royal; during which, he eliminated Raw's The Miz. On the following Raw, Miz took issue with the amount of attention that Knight was receiving and the disrespect he was shown from Knight. This prompted a confrontation between the two. After a couple of weeks of back-and-forth promos and interfering in matches, including Miz costing Knight a shot at the United States Championship, Miz challenged Knight to a match, which he accepted, and an interbrand match between the two was scheduled for Payback.

Since mid-July, Undisputed WWE Tag Team Champions Kevin Owens and Sami Zayn had been feuding with The Judgment Day (Finn Bálor, Damian Priest, "Dirty" Dominik Mysterio, and Rhea Ripley) after Judgment Day defeated Owens and Zayn's team in a six-man tag team match. This led to a match on the July 17 episode of Raw, where Owens and Zayn successfully defended the championship against Priest and Mysterio. Also during this time, Mysterio won the NXT North American Championship and successfully defended the title against Zayn after a distraction from Priest and Ripley, who attacked and injured Owens. Zayn's rivalry with The Judgment Day would continue through the next month, and on the August 21 episode, Owens made his return. Later that night, Owens and Zayn's team defeated The Judgment Day in a six-man tag team match. The following week, Owens and Zayn were scheduled to defend the Undisputed WWE Tag Team Championship against Bálor and Priest at Payback, and later, Owens and Zayn announced that after talking with WWE official Adam Pearce, the match would be a Pittsburgh Steel City Street Fight.

== Event ==
Other on-screen personnel
| Role: | Name: |
|---|---|
| Host | John Cena |
| English commentators | Michael Cole |
| English commentators | Corey Graves |
| Spanish commentators | Marcelo Rodriguez |
| Spanish commentators | Jerry Soto |
| Ring announcers | Mike Rome (SmackDown) |
| Ring announcers | Samantha Irvin (Raw) |
| Referees | Danilo Anfibio |
| Referees | Jason Ayers |
| Referees | John Cena (LA Knight vs. The Miz) |
| Referees | Daphanie LaShaunn |
| Referees | Chad Patton |
| Referees | Rod Zapata |
| Interviewers | Cathy Kelley |
| Interviewers | John Cena |
| Pre-show panel | Kayla Braxton |
| Pre-show panel | Jackie Redmond |
| Pre-show panel | Peter Rosenberg |
| Pre-show panel | Booker T |
| Pre-show panel | Wade Barrett |

=== Pre-show ===
During the Payback Kickoff pre-show, it was announced that John Cena would be the special guest referee for the match between LA Knight and The Miz, in addition to his hosting duties for the event.

=== Preliminary matches ===
In the opening match, Becky Lynch faced Trish Stratus in a Steel Cage match. In the opening stages, Stratus tried to escape the cage, but Lynch stopped her and delivered three Bexsploders. As Lynch attempted a clothesline, Stratus dodged it, but Lynch countered with a legdrop. As Stratus climbed the cage, Lynch stopped her and delivered a powerbomb for a two count. As Lynch attempted the Manhandle Slam, Stratus countered it into the Widow's Peak for a two count. As Stratus attempted the Stratusfaction, Lynch countered it into the Twist of Fate for a nearfall. Stratus then delivered the Stratusfaction for another nearfall. As Lynch attempted the avalanche Manhandle Slam, Stratus blocked it into an avalanche Stratusfaction for a two count. Lynch then delivered a superplex to Stratus from the top of the cage. As Stratus tried to escape through the cage door, Zoey Stark came out to assist her. Lynch stopped her and delivered a Manhandle Slam to Stratus, but Stark broke up the pin attempt. Lynch then delivered the Manhandle Slam to Stark and an avalanche Manhandle Slam to Stratus and then pinned her for the win. After the match, Stratus got furious and told Stark to exit the cage. Stark refused to listen and then delivered the Z360° to Stratus and then exited.

Next, Payback host John Cena came out to hype the crowd, only for The Miz to interrupt him. Miz gave Cena advice on hosting, however, Cena refused and stated that he wanted to be the special guest referee for Miz's match. This led into the second match in which SmackDown's LA Knight faced Raw's The Miz which featured Cena as the special guest referee. In the closing stages, Knight delivered a powerslam for a two count. Miz then delivered a back suplex and a lungblower for a two count. Miz then delivered two Miz-DTs for a two count. Knight then delivered a rolling DDT for a two count. Miz then delivered the Skull Crushing Finale, but as he attempted the Five Knuckle Shuffle (to mock Cena), Knight impeded him and delivered a powerslam, a leaping elbow drop, and the BFT for the win.

In the next match, Rey Mysterio defended the United States Championship against Austin Theory. In the opening stages, Mysterio delivered two clotheslines, a slingshot stomp, and two fisherman suplexes for a two count. As Theory attempted another fisherman suplex, Mysterio countered it into a small package for a two count. Theory then delivered a spinning sleeper slam for another nearfall. Mysterio then delivered a spinning headscissors takedown and a sliding tornado DDT. As Mysterio attempted the 619, Theory countered it into a spinning powerbomb for a nearfall. Mysterio then delivered the 619, but as he attempted a slingshot splash, Theory got the knees up and attempted the A-Town Down, but Mysterio countered it into a roll-up to get the win and retain the title. After the match, Mysterio celebrated with the Latino World Order (Santos Escobar, Cruz Del Toro, Joaquin Wilde, and Zelina Vega).

In the next match, Sami Zayn and Kevin Owens defended the Undisputed WWE Tag Team Championship against The Judgment Day (Finn Bálor and Damian Priest). In the opening stages, Zayn delivered a tope con giro to Priest and Bálor, but as Zayn attempted to bring Bálor back into the ring, Bálor hit him with a kendo stick. Owens and Zayn then started hitting Priest and Bálor with trash cans. Owens and Zayn then hit Bálor and Priest with steel chairs and vice versa. "Dirty" Dominik Mysterio then came out to assist Bálor and Priest in throwing Owens and Zayn into the penalty box, but as they turned around, Owens and Zayn were wearing Pittsburgh Penguins gear. Owens and Zayn then started hitting The Judgment Day with hockey sticks. Zayn then delivered a Blue Thunder Bomb to Bálor onto a pile of chairs for a two count. Priest then delivered a Broken Arrow to Zayn onto a stack of chairs for a two count. Bálor then delivered a clothesline to Owens into the crowd. Zayn then delivered a somersault senton to Priest and Bálor from the top of a glass platform. Owens then climbed the balcony and delivered a swanton bomb to Dominik through a table. Inside the ring, as Zayn attempted the Helluva Kick, Priest threw a trash can into Zayn's face. As Priest and Bálor attempted a Razor's Edge/Coup de Grâce combination, Zayn blocked it and pushed Bálor through a table. Owens and Zayn then delivered the Stunner/Helluva Kick combination to Priest, but JD McDonagh came out and pulled Zayn out of the ring to stop the pinfall attempt. Owens then delivered a pop-up spinebuster to McDonagh onto the cover of the announce table. Rhea Ripley then came out and performed a spear to Owens through the barricade. As Bálor attempted the Coup de Grâce, Zayn moved out of the way and delivered an exploder suplex and the Helluva Kick, but Dominik used Priest's Money in the Bank briefcase to hit Zayn, allowing Bálor to pin Zayn and win the tag titles. With this win, Bálor subsequently became the 24th overall Grand Slam Champion in WWE.

Following this, SmackDown's Grayson Waller hosted a special Payback edition of "The Grayson Waller Effect" with guest, Cody Rhodes from Raw. During the segment, Rhodes revealed that he was able to pull some strings and bring Jey Uso back as a member of the Raw roster—Jey was on SmackDown but had "quit" WWE a few weeks before Payback after a falling out with his brother Jimmy Uso and The Bloodline as a whole. After Jey made his entrance, Waller trash talked him and Jey performed a superkick on him.

In the penultimate match, Rhea Ripley defended the Women's World Championship against Raquel Rodriguez. In the closing stages, Ripley delivered a basement dropkick and a sliding knee strike for a two count. Rodriguez then delivered a delayed suplex and a running corkscrew elbow drop to Ripley for a two count. Ripley then locked in the Prism Lock submission, but Rodriguez escaped and delivered a big boot and a bodyslam. "Dirty" Dominik Mysterio then came out to distract Rodriguez, but Rodriguez delivered a powerslam to him. Ripley then kicked Rodriguez's injured knee and delivered the Riptide to retain the title.

Backstage, Payback host John Cena, who partially reenacted his Lance Catamaran character from WWE's YouTube series Southpaw Regional Wrestling, interviewed new Undisputed WWE Tag Team Champions The Judgment Day (Finn Bálor and Damian Priest). Bálor and Priest claimed that nobody could stop them.

=== Main event ===
In the main event, Seth "Freakin" Rollins defended the World Heavyweight Championship against Shinsuke Nakamura. In the opening stages, Rollins delivered two suicide dives to Nakamura on the outside. As Rollins attempted the Pedigree, Nakamura countered it into a back body drop. Rollins then delivered a senton, but Nakamura then delivered a back suplex to Rollins onto the announce table cover. Nakamura then delivered a running knee to Rollins' back. Rollins then performed an avalanche hurricanrana, a slingblade, and a frog splash for a two count. As Rollins attempted a powerbomb, Nakamura escaped, but Rollins immediately delivered the Rainmaker to Nakamura for a two count. Nakamura then performed a middle-rope Kinshasa for a two count. Nakamura then delivered a sliding german suplex and an exploder suplex. As Nakamura attempted the Kinshasa, Rollins impeded him with a superkick and a Pedigree for a nearfall. Nakamura then locked in a triangle choke, but Rollins used a powerbomb to escape the submission attempt. Nakamura then delivered a feint spinning heel kick, but Rollins then delivered an enziguri. Nakamura then performed a Kinshasa to the back of Rollins's head. As Rollins attempted the Curb Stomp, Nakamura intercepted it with a sit-down pin, but Rollins rolled through and delivered the Stomp and then pinned Nakamura to retain the title. After the event went off the air and as Rollins was making his way backstage, Nakamura attacked Rollins with a Kinshasa.

== Reception ==
Kevin Pantoja of 411Mania gave the event a 7 out of 10, praising The Judgment Day's performance and Jey Uso's return.

Dave Meltzer gave the Steel Cage match 4 stars. The LA Knight vs. The Miz match received 2.25 stars, the United States Championship match received 3.25 stars, the Undisputed WWE Tag Team Championship match received 4.25 stars, the Women's World Championship match received 1.75 stars, and the main event received 3.5 stars.

== Aftermath ==
From January 2023, there had been speculation that WWE had been placed up for sale. Hours before WrestleMania 39 Night 2 began, CNBC reported via multiple sources that a deal between WWE and Endeavor, the parent company of Ultimate Fighting Championship (UFC) via Zuffa, was imminent. The deal involved a merger of WWE with the UFC into a new publicly traded company, with Endeavor holding a 51% stake. The sale was confirmed the next day on April 3 and was finalized on September 12, with WWE merging with the UFC to become divisions of TKO Group Holdings. The 2023 Payback was in turn the final PLE held in which WWE was still owned and controlled by the McMahon family.

This would be the final Payback as no further events have been held since.

=== Raw ===
The following episode of Raw opened with Jey Uso, who thanked the fans and explained that Cody Rhodes had called him and subsequently was moved to Raw. Sami Zayn, who Jey had history with while Zayn was part of The Bloodline, came out. Zayn claimed he was proud that Jey broke free from The Bloodline and was glad he was on Raw. Despite Zayn offering him a handshake, Jey did not reciprocate. As Zayn was leaving, Jey called him back, referenced a joke about not feeling "Ucey", and offered the handshake, however, Zayn instead embraced Jey. Later, WWE official Adam Pearce revealed that a member of the Raw roster, which was later revealed to be Zayn's partner Kevin Owens, was traded to SmackDown and because of that, Jey could join Raw.

Also on Raw, Shinsuke Nakamura stated that he underestimated Seth "Freakin" Rollins and he would eventually win the World Heavyweight Championship. Later, Rollins said he did not feel right that Nakamura left Payback on his own two feet while he had to be helped out of the arena. He subsequently called out Nakamura and offered to have another title match against him that night, however, Nakamura declined as he wanted to do it on his own terms. A confused Rollins then brawled with Nakamura, who got the upper hand. After a couple of weeks of fighting, a frustrated Rollins said that Nakamura could choose the place, time, and stipulation for a rematch, and Nakamura chose a Last Man Standing match at Fastlane.

In a backstage interview during Raw, Zoey Stark stated that her partnership with Trish Stratus was over and that although she had learned a lot from Stratus, nobody pushes her.

The Judgment Day (Finn Bálor, Damian Priest, "Dirty" Dominik Mysterio, and Rhea Ripley) celebrated their championship wins on Raw. Bálor thanked everyone in the group, as well as JD McDonagh, who then came out. As McDonagh and Priest had been at odds, McDonagh presented Priest with a custom purple Money in the Bank briefcase as a peace offering. Sami Zayn then interrupted and noted that it took all five of them for Bálor and Priest to beat him and Owens for the Undisputed WWE Tag Team Championship. Zayn wanted to face Mysterio that night as it was he who cost them the titles, however, McDonagh offered to face him instead. Later, McDonagh defeated Zayn thanks to Mysterio's interference. Owens and Zayn then received their championship rematch against Bálor and Priest on the September 25 episode, however, Mysterio and McDonagh interfered once again, leading to Judgment Day retaining. During this time, The Judgment Day began feuding with Cody Rhodes and Jey Uso, and Bálor and Priest were scheduled to defend the Undisputed WWE Tag Team Championship against Rhodes and Uso at Fastlane.

Also on Raw, Raquel Rodriguez confronted WWE official Adam Pearce about a rematch against Women's World Champion Rhea Ripley due to "Dirty" Dominik Mysterio's interference. Pearce agreed and scheduled the championship rematch for the following week with Mysterio barred from ringside. Ripley retained once again, this time thanks to interference from a returning Nia Jax—in her first appearance since her one-night return at the Royal Rumble in January—who also attacked Ripley after the match. Following more weeks of feuding, Ripley, Rodriguez, and Jax were scheduled to take part in a fatal five-way match for the title at Crown Jewel also involving Zoey Stark and Shayna Baszler.

During a "Miz TV" segment on Raw, The Miz claimed that he was robbed of a win at Payback due to special guest referee, John Cena. He then introduced Cena as his guest, however, Cena did not appear; Miz acted if he was present and "interviewed" him (referencing Cena's "You Can't See Me" catchphrase) claiming that Knight conspired with Cena to screw Miz over. Miz then challenged Knight to a rematch without a special guest referee or any surprises.

=== SmackDown ===
On the following episode of SmackDown, LA Knight addressed his match with The Miz at Payback and accepted Miz's challenge for a rematch, which was scheduled for the following week. Knight was again victorious. Furthermore, after John Cena had praised Knight at Payback, Knight would subsequently aid Cena and join him as his tag team partner to face The Bloodline (Jimmy Uso and Solo Sikoa) at Fastlane.

Also on the following SmackDown, The Bloodline's manager Paul Heyman questioned Adam Pearce about who was traded to SmackDown for Jey Uso, however, Pearce refused to say. The following month on the October 13 episode, after WWE executive Triple H announced that Pearce—who had officiated for both Raw and SmackDown since January 2020—would now just be the general manager of Raw with former National Wrestling Alliance wrestler Nick Aldis introduced as SmackDown's general manager, Aldis revealed that Kevin Owens had been traded to SmackDown for Jey, in turn splitting the team of Owens and Sami Zayn.

== Results ==
| No. | Results | Stipulations | Times |
|---|---|---|---|
| 1 | Becky Lynch defeated Trish Stratus by pinfall | Steel Cage match | 20:00 |
| 2 | LA Knight defeated The Miz by pinfall | Singles match John Cena served as the special guest referee. | 15:45 |
| 3 | Rey Mysterio (c) defeated Austin Theory by pinfall | Singles match for the WWE United States Championship | 9:45 |
| 4 | The Judgment Day (Finn Bálor and Damian Priest) defeated Kevin Owens and Sami Zayn (c) by pinfall | Pittsburgh Steel City Street Fight for the Undisputed WWE Tag Team Championship (Note: The name "Undisputed WWE Tag Team Championship" referred to both the Raw Tag Team Championship and SmackDown Tag Team Championship being held and defended together, although both titles remained independently active.) | 20:45 |
| 5 | Rhea Ripley (c) defeated Raquel Rodriguez by pinfall | Singles match for the Women's World Championship | 17:20 |
| 6 | Seth "Freakin" Rollins (c) defeated Shinsuke Nakamura by pinfall | Singles match for the World Heavyweight Championship | 26:05 |
(c) / – the champion(s) heading into the match
