= Payback (2020) =

WWE pay-per-view and livestreaming event

- Promotional poster featuring Roman Reigns
- Promotion: WWE
- Brand(s): Raw; SmackDown
- Date: August 30, 2020
- City: Orlando, Florida
- Venue: WWE ThunderDome at Amway Center
- Attendance: 0 (behind closed doors) (Note: The event was held without a paying audience due to the COVID-19 pandemic in the United States, though it featured a live crowd of virtual fans via WWE's ThunderDome viewing experience.)

WWE event chronology
← Previous; SummerSlam	Next → Clash of Champions

Payback chronology
← Previous; 2017	Next → 2023

The 2020 Payback was a professional wrestling pay-per-view (PPV) and livestreaming event produced by WWE, held for wrestlers from the promotion's main roster brands, Raw and SmackDown. It was the sixth Payback and due to the COVID-19 pandemic, it took place on August 30, 2020, from the WWE ThunderDome, a bio-secure bubble that at the time was hosted at the Amway Center in Orlando, Florida. The concept of the event was based around wrestlers seeking payback against their opponents.

Eight matches were contested at the event, including one on the Kickoff pre-show. In the main event, a returning Roman Reigns, in his first match since February 2020, defeated defending champion "The Fiend" Bray Wyatt and Braun Strowman, who Reigns pinned, in a No Holds Barred triple threat match to win SmackDown's Universal Championship. In the preceding match, Rey Mysterio and Dominik Mysterio defeated Seth Rollins and Murphy. In other prominent matches, Keith Lee defeated Randy Orton, and the team of Nia Jax and Shayna Baszler defeated Bayley and Sasha Banks to win the WWE Women's Tag Team Championship.

This event is notable for marking the beginning of Roman Reigns's second Universal Championship reign, and the final reign for the title itself. The reign lasted for 1,316 days, ending at WrestleMania XL Night 2 on April 7, 2024. This set the record for the longest Universal Championship reign, also becoming the fourth-longest world championship reign in WWE history and the longest reign for any WWE championship since 1988. Midway through the reign at WrestleMania 38 in April 2022, Reigns also won Raw's WWE Championship, with both titles held and defended together as the Undisputed WWE Universal Championship. Upon Reigns's loss of the undisputed title at WrestleMania XL, the Universal Championship was officially retired in favor of the WWE Championship, which became known as the Undisputed WWE Championship.

This was the first Payback held since 2017, which made it the first to feature multiple brands during a brand split after the 2017 event was held exclusively for Raw. It was also the first and only to be held in August, as the prior five events were held between April and June. This would also be the final Payback held until 2023, subsequently making it the final to livestream on the American version of the WWE Network, which merged under Peacock in April 2021.

== Production ==
=== Background ===
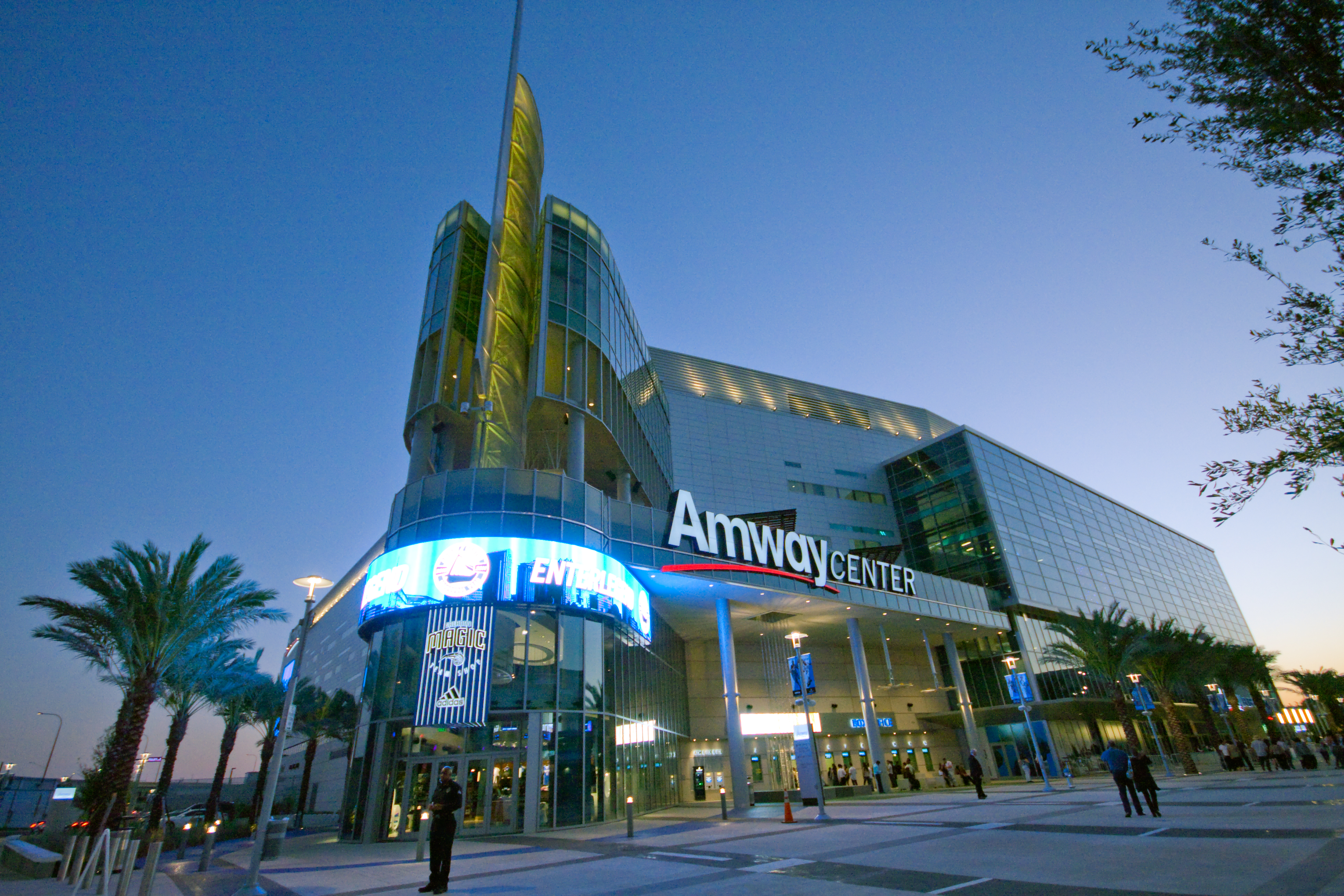
Due to the COVID-19 pandemic, the sixth Payback was produced by way of a bio-secure bubble called the WWE ThunderDome, which at the time was hosted at the Amway Center in Orlando, Florida.

Payback was a professional wrestling event that was established by WWE in 2013. It was originally broadcast exclusively via pay-per-view (PPV) before it began simultaneously livestreaming on the WWE Network in 2014. The concept of the event was based around wrestlers seeking payback against their opponents. The event ran annually from 2013 to 2017; the 2017 event was also held exclusively for wrestlers from Raw. Payback was expected to return in 2018 for SmackDown, but following WrestleMania 34 in April that year, WWE discontinued brand-exclusive PPV and livestreaming events for the main roster, resulting in the reduction of these events produced per year, thus also discontinuing Payback.

On July 31, 2020, PWInsider reported that WWE would be reinstating Payback for the following month on August 30. The sixth Payback was then officially announced during the August 14 episode of Friday Night SmackDown, confirming the reported date, which marked the first Payback to be held in August as all prior events were held between April and June. As a result of the discontinuation of brand-exclusive PPV and livestreaming events in April 2018, the 2020 event featured wrestlers from both Raw and SmackDown, marking the first Payback to feature multiple brands during a brand split.

==== Impact of the COVID-19 pandemic ====
As a result of the COVID-19 pandemic that began affecting the industry in mid-March, WWE had to present the majority of its programming from a behind closed doors set. Initially, Raw and SmackDown's shows were done at the WWE Performance Center in Orlando, Florida. A limited number of Performance Center trainees and friends and family members of the wrestlers were later utilized to serve as the live audience. PWInsider initially reported that Payback would also be held at the Performance Center, but just a week prior to the event, all of Raw and SmackDown's programs were moved to a bio-secure bubble called the WWE ThunderDome, which at the time was hosted at Orlando's Amway Center. The select live audience was no longer utilized as the bubble allowed fans to attend the events virtually for free and be seen on the nearly 1,000 LED boards within the arena. Additionally, the ThunderDome utilized various special effects to further enhance wrestlers' entrances, and arena audio was mixed with that of the chants from the virtual fans.

=== Storylines ===
The event comprised eight matches, including one on the Kickoff pre-show, that resulted from scripted storylines. Results were predetermined by WWE's writers on the Raw and SmackDown brands, while storylines were produced on WWE's weekly television shows, Monday Night Raw and Friday Night SmackDown.

On the August 14 episode of SmackDown, it was revealed that Bayley and Sasha Banks would defend the WWE Women's Tag Team Championship at Payback. Their opponents were revealed on the August 24 episode of Raw; the team of Nia Jax and Shayna Baszler.

At SummerSlam, "The Fiend" Bray Wyatt defeated Braun Strowman to win the Universal Championship for the second time. Following the match, Roman Reigns made his return after a five-month hiatus and viciously attacked The Fiend and Strowman, turning heel for the first time since 2014. The following day, it was announced that The Fiend would defend the title against Strowman and Reigns in a no holds barred triple threat match at Payback. On that Friday's SmackDown, WWE Chairman and Chief Executive Officer Vince McMahon assigned producer Adam Pearce to obtain signatures from the three competitors for their match by the end of the night. After obtaining Wyatt and Strowman's signatures, Pearce located Reigns, where it was revealed that he had aligned himself with Paul Heyman. Reigns affirmed he would be at Payback and win the match. However, he did not sign the contract.

On the August 24 episode of Raw, after attacking WWE Champion Drew McIntyre with two Punts, Randy Orton, who lost to McIntyre at SummerSlam, wanted another rematch for the title, but he was interrupted by former NXT wrestler Keith Lee, making his Raw debut. On behalf of McIntyre, Lee challenged Orton to a match only for Orton to decline. However, the two fought each other later on, with Orton winning via disqualification after McIntyre attacked him. Orton later attacked McIntyre backstage with a third Punt, taking McIntyre out. A rematch between Lee and Orton was subsequently confirmed for Payback.

At SummerSlam, Seth Rollins (who was accompanied by his disciple Murphy) defeated Dominik Mysterio (who was accompanied by his father Rey Mysterio) in a Street Fight. The following night on Raw, Rey and Dominik defeated Rollins and Murphy by disqualification when Retribution attacked the Mysterios. A rematch between the two teams was scheduled for Payback.

At SummerSlam, Apollo Crews defeated MVP to retain the United States Championship. The following night on Raw, Crews was scheduled to defend the title against MVP's stablemate of The Hurt Business, Bobby Lashley, at Payback.

On the July 17 episode of SmackDown, after Matt Riddle failed to win the Intercontinental Championship, he was attacked by King Corbin. The two continued their feud over the next few weeks and on the August 28 episode, a match between the two was scheduled for Payback.

On the August 14 episode of SmackDown, after Big E won his match, he was attacked by Sheamus. A match between the two took place the following week, where Big E won. On August 29, another match between the two was scheduled for Payback.

On August 29, after weeks of feuding with each other, a match pitting Ruby Riott and Liv Morgan against The IIconics (Billie Kay and Peyton Royce) was scheduled for the Kickoff pre-show.

== Event ==
Other on-screen personnel
Role:	Name:
English commentators	Michael Cole (SmackDown)
English commentators	Corey Graves (SmackDown)
English commentators	Tom Phillips (Raw)
English commentators	Samoa Joe (Raw)
English commentators	Byron Saxton (Raw)
Spanish commentator	Marcelo Rodriguez
Ring announcers	Greg Hamilton (SmackDown)
Ring announcers	Mike Rome (Raw)
Referees	Danilo Anfibio
Referees	Shawn Bennett
Referees	Jessika Carr
Referees	Dan Engler
Referees	Darrick Moore
Referees	Eddie Orengo
Referees	Chad Patton
Referees	Charles Robinson
Interviewers	Charly Caruso
Interviewers	Kayla Braxton
Interviewers	Alyse Ashton
Pre-show panel	Charly Caruso
Pre-show panel	John "Bradshaw" Layfield
Pre-show panel	Peter Rosenberg
Pre-show panel	Booker T
Pre-show panel	Jerry Lawler

=== Pre-show ===
During the Payback Kickoff pre-show, The Riott Squad (Ruby Riott and Liv Morgan) faced The IIconics (Peyton Royce and Billie Kay). In the end, Morgan performed the Jersey Codebreaker on Kay followed by Riott performing a Riott Kick on Kay to win the match.

=== Preliminary matches ===
The actual pay-per-view opened with Apollo Crews defending the United States Championship against Bobby Lashley (accompanied by MVP and Shelton Benjamin). After a competitive match, Lashley forced Crews to tap out to the Full Lashley Lock to win the title for a second time. Following the match, Crews attacked Lashley and stated that he would win his title back.

Next, Big E faced Sheamus. In the end, Big E performed the Big Ending on Sheamus to win the match.

After that, Matt Riddle fought King Corbin. In the climax, Riddle performed the Floating Bro on Corbin to win the match. Following the match, an irate Corbin attacked Riddle during a backstage interview.

In the next match, Bayley and Sasha Banks defended the WWE Women's Tag Team Championship against Nia Jax and Shayna Baszler. In the closing moments, Baszler applied the Kirifuda Clutch on Bayley while simultaneously applying the death lock on Banks. As Banks attempted to poke the eyes of Baszler, Baszler used Banks' own arm to choke Bayley, who tapped out, to win the titles. Following the match, an elated Jax and Baszler celebrated their victory in the ring while a disappointed Bayley and Banks sat at ringside.

Next, Keith Lee faced Randy Orton. During the match, Orton would constantly taunt Lee by stating that Lee should respect him. Outside the ring, Lee threw Orton on the announce table. In the climax, as Orton attempted an RKO, Lee countered into a Spirit Bomb to win the match.

In the penultimate match, father-and-son team, Rey and Dominik Mysterio faced Seth Rollins and Murphy. In the climax, as Rollins attempted a Powerbomb on Mysterio, Mysterio countered out of it, throwing Rollins back. Murphy (the legal partner) then accidentally kicked Rollins in the head, taking him out. Dominik then took advantage and performed a 619 and a splash on Murphy to win the match.

=== Main event ===
In the main event, "The Fiend" Bray Wyatt defended the Universal Championship against Braun Strowman and Roman Reigns in a no holds barred triple threat match. The Fiend made his entrance first and after the lights illuminated, he was attacked by Strowman to start the match, despite Reigns having not yet entered. This led to The Fiend and Strowman fighting each other. Strowman performed a Powerslam on The Fiend for a nearfall. The Fiend then performed a Sister Abigail on Strowman for a nearfall. The Fiend then performed a Uranage on Strowman through the announce table. The Fiend then obtained his Fiend-themed mallet, however, Strowman rose to his feet and attacked The Fiend. The Fiend then attacked Strowman with the mallet. The Fiend attacked Strowman with the steel steps, after which, both fought on the entrance ramp, where The Fiend threw Strowman into the LED screen atop the stage. As The Fiend attempted Sister Abigail on Strowman on the stage, Strowman countered and performed a Spear on The Fiend, knocking The Fiend and himself off the stage. Strowman and The Fiend then fought back in the ring where Strowman attempted a splash on The Fiend. The Fiend, however, countered and performed a Superplex off the top rope, causing the ring to implode. Roman Reigns (accompanied by Paul Heyman) then finally made his entrance wielding a chair and signed the match contract, officially entering him into the match. Reigns entered the ring and attempted to pin The Fiend and Strowman, however, both were nearfalls. Reigns then attacked Strowman with multiple chair shots and attempted another pin, only to get another nearfall. As Reigns attempted to attack The Fiend with the chair, The Fiend rose to his feet and applied the Mandible Claw on Reigns, who performed a low blow on The Fiend, taking him out. Reigns then performed a Spear on Strowman and pinned him to regain the title for a second time, and begin his historic reign.

== Reception ==
Dave Meltzer rated Seth Rollins and Murphy vs. The Mysterios 3.5 stars, making it his highest rated match of the night. He rated the kick-off show match 1.5 stars, the lowest of the night. From there, the United States Championship match received 2.75 stars, the Women's Tag Team Championship match received 3 stars, Big E vs. Sheamus received 3.25 stars, King Corbin vs. Matt Riddle received 2.75 stars, Keith Lee vs. Randy Orton received 2.25 stars, and the main event received 2.75 stars.

== Aftermath ==
This was the final Payback held until it was reinstated in 2023 for September that year. As a result, this was the final Payback to livestream on the American version of the WWE Network, which merged under Peacock in April 2021.

=== Raw ===
The following night on Raw, three singles matches were set up with the winners of each facing each other in a triple threat match that night to determine the number one contender against Drew McIntyre for the WWE Championship at Clash of Champions. Randy Orton, Keith Lee, and Seth Rollins won their respective matches over Kevin Owens, Dolph Ziggler, and Dominik Mysterio. Orton then won the ensuing triple threat match to secure another shot at McIntyre and the WWE Championship.

Also on the following Raw, The Riott Squad (Ruby Riott and Liv Morgan) faced The IIconics (Peyton Royce and Billie Kay) in a rematch, with the added stipulation that the winning team would earn a shot at the WWE Women's Tag Team Championship while the losing team would disband. The Riott Squad won the match and the title opportunity, while The IIconics had to disband as a team. Their title match was later confirmed for Clash of Champions.

Apollo Crews would continue his feud with The Hurt Business (Shelton Benjamin, MVP, and United States Champion Bobby Lashley) over the next few weeks and on the September 21 episode of Raw, a championship rematch between Crews and Lashley was scheduled for Clash of Champions.

=== SmackDown ===
On the following SmackDown, new Universal Champion and a now heel Roman Reigns along with Paul Heyman opened the show. Heyman explained their new partnership in which he said he was serving as the "special counsel" for Reigns (unlike his role of "advocate" for Brock Lesnar). He stated that it was Reigns who brought him back, because just as WWE had essentially all but forgot about Reigns during his hiatus, they had also done the same to Heyman following his own on-screen absence since WrestleMania 36 (albeit a brief appearance at Money in the Bank). He also criticized the fans for their lack of respect for Reigns and his work ethic despite his health issues. He also mocked the fact that Braun Strowman and "The Fiend" Bray Wyatt were chosen to reign as Universal Champion during the past five months, and that neither deserved the title. Heyman also announced that Reigns's challenger for the title at Clash of Champions would be determined in a fatal four-way match that night. Big E, Matt Riddle, King Corbin, and Sheamus were set for the match, however, Big E was deemed unable to compete due to a backstage attack from Sheamus. Reigns's own cousin Jey Uso replaced Big E in the match and subsequently won. Reigns would continue as Universal Champion until WrestleMania XL in April 2024, where he was dethroned by Cody Rhodes, reigning for a record length of 1,316 days.

Matt Riddle and King Corbin would have a rematch on the September 25 episode of SmackDown with Corbin emerging victorious.

Big E and Sheamus would also continue their feud, which would go all the way to a Falls Count Anywhere match on the October 9 episode of SmackDown, which was won by Big E.

Bayley and Sasha Banks faced Nia Jax and Shayna Baszler in a rematch for the WWE Women's Tag Team Championship. During the match, Banks attempted to attack Baszler, who was teetering on the ring post, with a double knee maneuver, however, Baszler avoided Banks, who injured her left knee on the post. They ultimately lost the match after Jax performed a diving crossbody on Banks and Bayley and pinned both women to retain the titles. After the match, medical personnel tended to Banks while a visibly horrified Bayley watched on. Bayley then feigned helping Banks to the backstage area, only to turn on Banks and viciously attack her, effectively disbanding the team. After more weeks of feuding, Banks and Bayley would have a SmackDown Women's Championship match on the October 9 episode of SmackDown, which ended in a disqualification win for Banks after Bayley used a chair, but Bayley retained. However, Banks gained the upper hand. Afterwards, Banks challenged Bayley to a Hell in a Cell match for the title at Hell in a Cell, which was made official the next day.

== Results ==
No.	Results	Stipulations	Times
1^{P}	The Riott Squad (Ruby Riott and Liv Morgan) defeated The IIconics (Billie Kay and Peyton Royce) by pinfall	Tag team match	9:00
2	Bobby Lashley (with MVP and Shelton Benjamin) defeated Apollo Crews (c) by submission	Singles match for the WWE United States Championship	9:00
3	Big E defeated Sheamus by pinfall	Singles match	12:20
4	Matt Riddle defeated King Corbin by pinfall	Singles match	10:55
5	Shayna Baszler and Nia Jax defeated Bayley and Sasha Banks (c) by submission	Tag team match for the WWE Women's Tag Team Championship	10:20
6	Keith Lee defeated Randy Orton by pinfall	Singles match	6:40
7	Rey Mysterio and Dominik Mysterio defeated Seth Rollins and Murphy by pinfall	Tag team match	16:00
8	Roman Reigns (with Paul Heyman) defeated "The Fiend" Bray Wyatt (c) and Braun Strowman by pinfall	Triple Threat match (Note: the match was also billed as a no holds barred) for the WWE Universal Championship	12:46
(c) / – the champion(s) heading into the match; P / – the match was broadcast on the pre-show
