= Payback (2017) =

WWE pay-per-view and livestreaming event

- Promotional poster featuring Chris Jericho
- Promotion: WWE
- Brand: Raw
- Date: April 30, 2017
- City: San Jose, California
- Venue: SAP Center
- Attendance: 13,694

WWE event chronology
← Previous; WrestleMania 33	Next → United Kingdom Championship Special

Payback chronology
← Previous; 2016	Next → 2020

The 2017 Payback was a professional wrestling pay-per-view (PPV) and livestreaming event produced by WWE, held primarily for wrestlers from the promotion's main roster brand, Raw. It was the fifth annual Payback and took place on April 30, 2017, at the SAP Center in San Jose, California. The concept of the event was based around wrestlers seeking payback against their opponents.

Eight matches were contested at the event, including one on the Kickoff pre-show. Due to that year's Superstar Shake-up (draft) that occurred just two weeks before Payback, the event included two interbrand matches with wrestlers from SmackDown as the matches had been scheduled before the Shake-up occurred. In the main event, Braun Strowman defeated Roman Reigns. In other prominent matches, Raw's Bray Wyatt defeated SmackDown's Randy Orton in a House of Horrors match, which was a cinematic match, and Seth Rollins defeated Samoa Joe to end his undefeated streak since joining the main roster. The event also saw two titles change hands: in the opening bout, Raw's Chris Jericho defeated SmackDown's Kevin Owens to win back the United States Championship, thus transferring Jericho to the SmackDown brand, and Alexa Bliss defeated Bayley to win the Raw Women's Championship, becoming the first woman to hold both it and the SmackDown Women's Championship.

This was the first Payback held since the reintroduction of the brand extension in July 2016 and it was the final Payback held until 2020. It was originally planned to return as a SmackDown-exclusive event in 2018, but following WrestleMania 34 in April that year, WWE discontinued brand-exclusive PPV and livestreaming events for the main roster, reducing the amount of these events produced per year. As a result, this was the only brand-exclusive Payback held.

== Production ==
=== Background ===
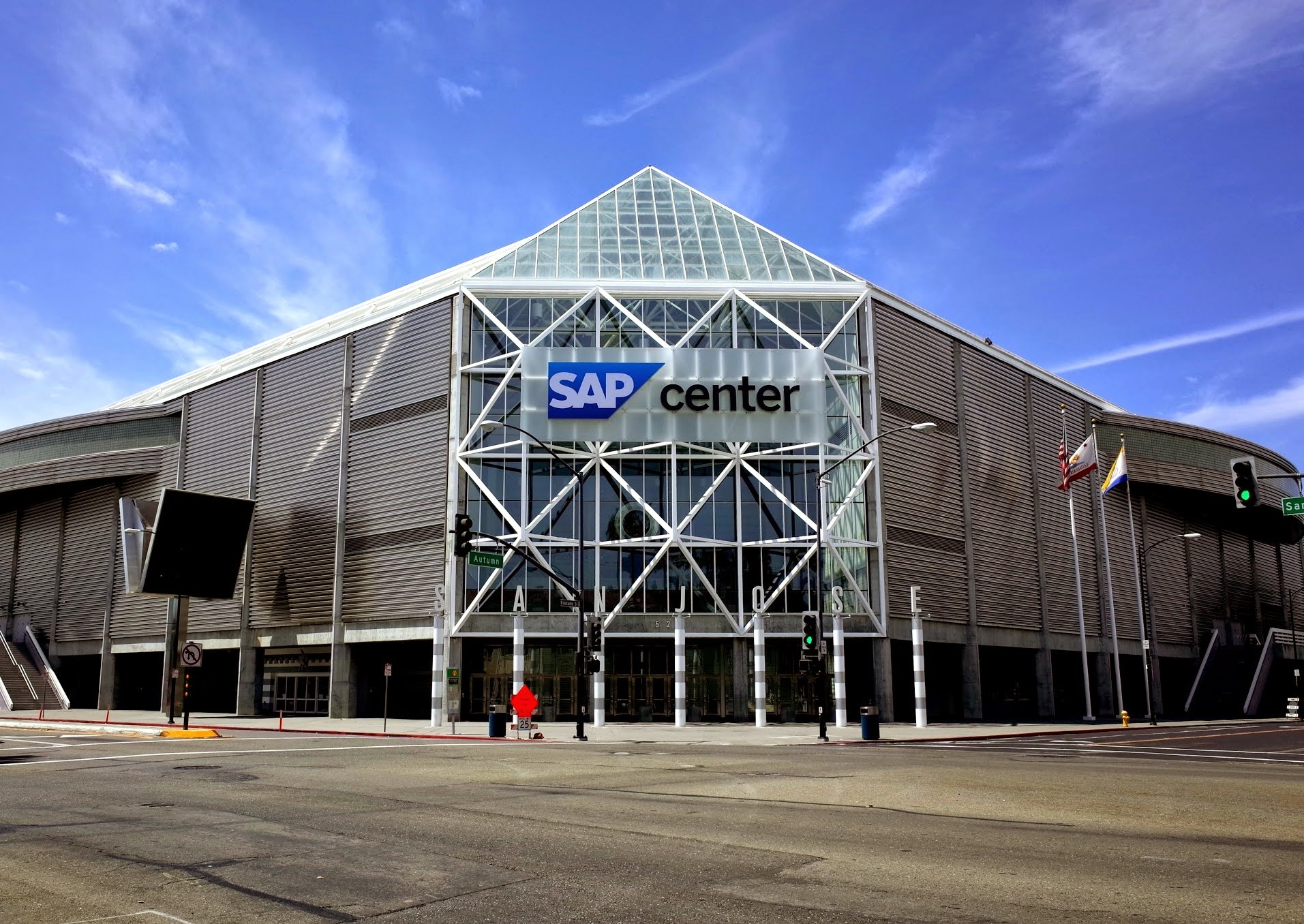
The fifth annual Payback was held at the SAP Center in San Jose, California.

Payback was an annual professional wrestling event that was established by WWE in 2013. It was originally broadcast exclusively via pay-per-view (PPV) before it began simultaneously livestreaming on the WWE Network in 2014. The concept of the event was based around wrestlers seeking payback against their opponents. Announced on February 20, 2017, the fifth event was scheduled to be held on April 30, 2017, at the SAP Center in San Jose, California. Tickets went on sale on February 24 through Ticketmaster. This was the first Payback to be held following the reintroduction of the brand extension in July 2016, where the promotion again split its main roster between the Raw and SmackDown brands where wrestlers were exclusively assigned to perform. The 2017 event was subsequently scheduled to be held for Raw.

=== Storylines ===
The event comprised eight matches, including one on the Kickoff pre-show, that resulted from scripted storylines. Results were predetermined by WWE's writers on the Raw brand, while storylines were produced on WWE's weekly television shows, Monday Night Raw and the cruiserweight-exclusive 205 Live. As a result of the Superstar Shake-up (draft) that occurred two weeks before the event, Payback also included two interbrand matches that involved wrestlers from the SmackDown brand; part of their storylines were also produced on SmackDown Live.

At WrestleMania 33, Kevin Owens defeated Chris Jericho to win his first United States Championship. The following night on Raw, Jericho was granted a rematch for the championship at Payback. Jericho and Seth Rollins were then scheduled to face Owens and Samoa Joe on Raw, however, Owens and Joe attacked Jericho backstage, taking him out of the match. Jericho was then replaced by the returning Finn Bálor, who had been out since SummerSlam last year, and Rollins and Bálor defeated Owens and Joe. The following week, Owens faced and lost to Intercontinental Champion Dean Ambrose, who was moved to the Raw brand as a result of the Superstar Shake-up. Following the match, Jericho appeared and performed a Codebreaker to Owens. The next night on SmackDown, Owens was moved to the SmackDown brand. SmackDown General Manager Daniel Bryan then announced that Jericho would transfer to SmackDown as well if he defeated Owens for the title at Payback. The two traded barbs from their respective shows over the next couple of weeks.

On the WrestleMania 33 Kickoff pre-show, Neville defeated Austin Aries to retain the WWE Cruiserweight Championship. On the April 4 episode of 205 Live, Aries won a fatal four-way match to earn another match against Neville at Payback.

At WrestleMania 33, Randy Orton defeated Bray Wyatt to win his ninth WWE Championship. On the following episode of SmackDown, Wyatt challenged Orton to a "House of Horrors" match and Orton accepted. Wyatt and the returning Erick Rowan then lost a tag team match against Orton and Luke Harper. On the April 10 episode of Raw, Wyatt was moved to the Raw brand as a result of the Superstar Shake-up, however, he was still allowed his non-title rematch with Orton, which was confirmed to happen at Payback. The next night on SmackDown, Orton faced Rowan. During the match, Wyatt appeared on the TitanTron, after which, Rowan attacked Orton with the steel steps and was disqualified. Wyatt similarly delivered promos about the House of Horrors match over the next couple of weeks on both Raw and SmackDown. Despite the match being originally scheduled for Orton's WWE Championship, it was later changed to a non-title match.

At WrestleMania 33, The Hardy Boyz (Jeff Hardy and Matt Hardy) made their return to WWE and were inserted into the Raw Tag Team Championship fatal four-way ladder match, where they won the championship. The following night on Raw, former champions Luke Gallows and Karl Anderson invoked their rematch clause, however, they lost the match. Later that night, Cesaro and Sheamus defeated Enzo Amore and Big Cass, both teams who were also part of the title match at WrestleMania, to become the number one contenders for the championship, and the match was scheduled for Payback.

On the January 30 episode of Raw, Samoa Joe debuted on the roster debut by attacking Seth Rollins on Triple H's behalf. Joe attacked Rollins re-injured knee, the same knee that had sidelined Rollins from November 2015 to May 2016, which almost prevented Rollins from competing at WrestleMania 33. However, Rollins managed to recover enough to defeat Triple H in an unsanctioned match at WrestleMania. On the post-WrestleMania Raw, Rollins teamed up with the returning Finn Bálor and defeated Joe and Kevin Owens. The following week during the Superstar Shake-up, unsure of his fate, Rollins spoke about what he still wanted to do on Raw, which included settling his score with Joe. New Raw General Manager Kurt Angle declared that Rollins would be staying on Raw, after which, Joe came out and attacked Rollins. A match between the two was scheduled for Payback, and both traded barbs on the following Raw. On the final Raw before Payback, Rollins, Enzo Amore, and Big Cass were scheduled to face Joe, Luke Gallows, and Karl Anderson, but Gallows and Anderson attacked Amore, taking him out of the match. Amore was replaced by Finn Bálor, and the team of Rollins, Cass, and Bálor defeated Joe, Gallows, and Anderson. Gallows and Anderson were then scheduled to face Amore and Cass on the Payback Kickoff pre-show.

At the Royal Rumble, Braun Strowman interfered in the Universal Championship match, costing Roman Reigns the title. The two then faced each other at Fastlane, where Reigns was victorious. The following night on Raw, Strowman declared that Reigns had gotten lucky and wanted another rematch, however, he was interrupted by The Undertaker. Reigns then began a rivalry with Undertaker and defeated him at WrestleMania 33. Strowman then reignited his feud with Reigns on the April 10 episode of Raw, where he brutally attacked Reigns backstage, including pushing Reigns, who was strapped onto a stretcher, off a loading dock, and then tipped over an ambulance that Reigns was inside, thereby injuring Reigns's shoulder in the process. The following week, Raw General Manager Kurt Angle announced that Strowman would face Reigns at Payback.

At WrestleMania 33, Bayley defeated Sasha Banks, Nia Jax, and Charlotte Flair in a fatal four-way elimination match to retain the Raw Women's Championship. On the April 10 episode of Raw, Banks declared her desire to challenge Bayley for the title. Alexa Bliss, who had lost the SmackDown Women's Championship at WrestleMania 33, then appeared, followed by Mickie James, and both revealed that they had been moved to Raw as a result of the Superstar Shake-up; Flair was transferred to SmackDown. The next week, Bliss defeated Banks, James, and Jax in a fatal four-way match to become the number one contender against Bayley for the Raw Women's Championship at Payback.

On the April 10 episode of Raw, The Miz and his wife Maryse were moved to the Raw brand as a result of the Superstar Shake-up. On the April 24 episode, it was announced that Finn Bálor would be The Miz's guest on "Miz TV", which was scheduled for the Payback Kickoff pre-show.

== Event ==
Other on-screen personnel
Role:	Name:
English commentators	Michael Cole
English commentators	Corey Graves
English commentators	Booker T
Spanish commentators	Carlos Cabrera
Spanish commentators	Marcelo Rodríguez
German commentators	Carsten Schaefer
German commentators	Tim Haber
German commentators	Calvin Knie
Ring announcer	JoJo
Referees	John Cone
Referees	Darrick Moore
Referees	Chad Patton
Referees	Rod Zapata
Backstage interviewer	Charly Caruso
Pre-show panel	Renee Young
Pre-show panel	Jerry Lawler
Pre-show panel	Sam Roberts
Raw Talk panel	Renee Young
Raw Talk panel	Jerry Lawler

=== Pre-show ===
During the Payback Kickoff pre-show, Enzo Amore and Big Cass faced Luke Gallows and Karl Anderson. Amore pinned Gallows with a schoolboy for the win.

Later, The Miz hosted "Miz TV" with Finn Bálor as the guest. Bálor stated that he wanted the Universal Championship back, as he never lost it, and ended up attacking Miz.

=== Preliminary matches ===
The actual pay-per-view opened with the first interbrand match, in which SmackDown's Kevin Owens defended the United States Championship against Raw's Chris Jericho. Owens attempted a Pop-up Powerbomb on Jericho, who countered into a hurricanrana. Jericho applied the "Walls of Jericho" but Owens touched the ropes with only one finger to break the hold. After Owens failed to execute a Pop Up Powerbomb, Jericho forced Owens to submit to the "Walls of Jericho" to regain the title for a second time. As a result of the win, Jericho was transferred to the SmackDown brand.

Next, Neville defended the WWE Cruiserweight Championship against Austin Aries. In the climax, as Aries applied the "Last Chancery", Neville pulled the referee by his shirt. The referee then disqualified Neville, resulting in Aries winning the match but not the title.

Later, The Hardy Boyz (Jeff Hardy and Matt Hardy) defended the Raw Tag Team Championship against Cesaro and Sheamus. The end came when Jeff performed a "Swanton Bomb" on Sheamus, who was covering Matt and unaware that Jeff was the legal man. Jeff then pinned Sheamus to retain the titles. After the match, the two teams shook hands. However, as Jeff and Matt were celebrating, Cesaro and Sheamus returned and attacked The Hardys, thereby turning heel.

In the fourth match, Bayley defend the Raw Women's Championship against Alexa Bliss. In the climax, Bayley countered a Code Red attempt by Bliss into a pinning combination, but Bliss kicked out and sent Bayley head first into the ring post. Bayley then rolled up Bliss, but Bliss kicked out and performed a Snap DDT on Bayley to win the title for the first time. As a result of her win, Bliss became the first wrestler to win both the Raw and SmackDown women's championships.

Next was the second interbrand match, in which SmackDown's WWE Champion Randy Orton faced Raw's Bray Wyatt in a non-title House of Horrors match. The match was a No Holds Barred match type that began in the House of Horrors, but could only be won by pinning or submitting their opponent in the ring or by forfeit. A cinematic match, it began when Orton broke into the house and Wyatt attacked Orton. Orton and Wyatt fought throughout the house and into the kitchen, where Wyatt pushed a refrigerator onto Orton. Wyatt then stole Orton's limousine and drove to the arena.

In the meantime back in the arena, Seth Rollins faced Samoa Joe. Joe applied the "Coquina Clutch" on Rollins, who countered into a pin for the win, ending Joe's undefeated streak since debuting on the main roster in January 2017.

Later, Raw's Bray Wyatt arrived at the arena and performed his usual entrance. As the lights came on, SmackDown's Randy Orton appeared and attacked Wyatt. SmackDown's The Singh Brothers (Samir and Sunil) then appeared and attacked Orton, who managed to fight them off. Orton performed an "RKO" on Wyatt, only for Jinder Mahal to attack Orton with the title belt he had stolen from Orton on the previous episode of SmackDown. Wyatt then performed "Sister Abigail" on Orton to win the match.

=== Main event ===
In the main event, Roman Reigns faced Braun Strowman. Strowman performed a chokeslam on Reigns onto a broadcast table. Reigns performed a spear on Strowman for a near-fall. Reigns performed two "Superman Punches" on Strowman and attempted a third, however, Strowman applied a lifting arm triangle choke and performed a running powerslam on Reigns for a near-fall. In the climax, Strowman performed a second Running Powerslam on Reigns to win the match. After the match, Strowman attacked Reigns with the steel steps and stood tall as the event ended.

== Aftermath ==
Immediately following Payback on Raw Talk, Roman Reigns was about to be taken to a medical facility, but Braun Strowman attempted to further damage him. Reigns retaliated by slamming an ambulance door against Strowman's arm multiple times. The next night on Raw, General Manager Kurt Angle addressed the two's condition and said that both were injured. The following week, Strowman, in an arm sling, said that after he was completely finished with Reigns, he wanted Brock Lesnar and the Universal Championship, but Kalisto came out and demanded a rematch. That match ended after Reigns came out and attacked Strowman. On the May 15 episode, it was revealed that Strowman required surgery on his injured arm, and would be out for up to six months. Reigns, Seth Rollins, Samoa Joe, Bray Wyatt, and Finn Bálor were scheduled to compete in a Universal Championship number one contender's extreme rules fatal five-way match at Extreme Rules.

Also on the post-Payback Raw, Seth Rollins said that his business with Samoa Joe was done. He then turned his attention to Universal Champion Brock Lesnar, however, Finn Bálor interrupted and stated that he should be the next person to face Lesnar as Bálor was the inaugural champion and never lost the title. Intercontinental Champion Dean Ambrose then came out. He criticized Lesnar for not appearing and wrestling often and claimed the Intercontinental Championship to be the top title of Raw. The Miz then came out and said that he should be the one to face Ambrose for the title. A number one contender's match was scheduled between Rollins, Bálor, and Miz, which Miz won after interference from Joe and Bray Wyatt. The Miz and Ambrose had their title match on the May 15 episode where Miz won by disqualification. A rematch between the two was scheduled for Extreme Rules where if Ambrose were to get disqualified, he would lose the title.

Jeff Hardy received medical attention after losing a tooth from a kick by Sheamus midway through their Payback match. On the post-Payback Raw, Cesaro and Sheamus explained their reasoning for attacking The Hardy Boyz. They called The Hardys a novelty act and criticized the fans for living in the past instead of appreciating the present and claimed that The Hardys stole their moment at WrestleMania 33. Cesaro and Sheamus subsequently won a number one contender's tag team turmoil match for another title opportunity at Extreme Rules, which was made a Steel Cage match.

Also on the post-Payback Raw, new Raw Women's Champion Alexa Bliss had a coronation on becoming the new champion as well as being the first woman to win both the Raw and SmackDown women's titles. The other seven female wrestlers on the Raw roster were also in the ring. She belittled Mickie James, Sasha Banks, and Bayley before a brawl broke out that resulted in an eight-woman tag team match where the team of Bliss, Nia Jax, Emma, and Alicia Fox defeated the team of Bayley, Banks, James, and Dana Brooke. On the May 15 episode, Bayley invoked her championship rematch clause for Extreme Rules, and it was made a Kendo Stick-on-a-Pole match.

WWE Cruiserweight Champion Neville and T. J. Perkins continued their feud with Austin Aries. Perkins was defeated by Aries on the post-Payback Raw, but Perkins attacked Aries after the match and attempted to injure him. Aries was given another championship opportunity at Extreme Rules in a submission match.

On the May 2 episode of SmackDown, Kevin Owens defeated Chris Jericho in a rematch for the United States Championship. Owens subsequently injured Jericho, taking him out of action. Owens was then scheduled to defend the title against AJ Styles at SmackDown's pay-per-view Backlash.

The 2017 Payback would be the final Payback event until it was reinstated in 2020. A SmackDown-exclusive Payback was originally planned to be held in 2018, but following WrestleMania 34 in April that year, WWE discontinued brand-exclusive PPV and livestreaming events for the main roster, reducing the amount of these events produced per year. This subsequently made the 2017 event the only brand-exclusive Payback.

== Results ==
No.	Results	Stipulations	Times
1^{P}	Enzo Amore and Big Cass defeated Luke Gallows and Karl Anderson by pinfall	Tag team match	6:35
2	Chris Jericho defeated Kevin Owens (c) by submission	Singles match for the WWE United States Championship; Since Jericho won the title, he was transferred to SmackDown.	14:00
3	Austin Aries defeated Neville (c) by disqualification	Singles match for the WWE Cruiserweight Championship	11:20
4	The Hardy Boyz (Matt Hardy and Jeff Hardy) (c) defeated Cesaro and Sheamus by pinfall	Tag team match for the WWE Raw Tag Team Championship	12:45
5	Alexa Bliss defeated Bayley (c) by pinfall	Singles match for the WWE Raw Women's Championship	11:15
6	Bray Wyatt defeated Randy Orton by pinfall	House of Horrors match	17:10 (Note: This time indicates the combined length of time that the match was shown on the show's broadcast. As the first part of this match was pre-taped prior to Payback at the House of Horrors and with the second part occurring live in the arena, it is impossible to determine the exact length of time that the match was taped for during filming which took place at the House of Horrors.)
7	Seth Rollins defeated Samoa Joe by pinfall	Singles match	15:55
8	Braun Strowman defeated Roman Reigns by pinfall	Singles match	11:50
(c) / – the champion(s) heading into the match; P / – the match was broadcast on the pre-show
