= Battleground (2017) =

WWE pay-per-view and livestreaming event

- Promotional poster featuring Jinder Mahal and Randy Orton inside the Punjabi Prison structure
- Promotion: WWE
- Brand: SmackDown
- Date: July 23, 2017
- City: Philadelphia, Pennsylvania
- Venue: Wells Fargo Center
- Attendance: 12,500
- Tagline: The Return of the Punjabi Prison

WWE event chronology
← Previous; Great Balls of Fire	Next → NXT TakeOver: Brooklyn III

Battleground chronology
← Previous; 2016	Next → 2023

The 2017 Battleground was a professional wrestling pay-per-view (PPV) and livestreaming event produced by WWE, held exclusively for wrestlers from the promotion's main roster brand, SmackDown. It was the fifth annual Battleground and took place on July 23, 2017, at the Wells Fargo Center in Philadelphia, Pennsylvania.

Eight matches were contested at the event, including one match on the Kickoff pre-show. In the main event, Jinder Mahal defeated Randy Orton in the third-ever Punjabi Prison match to retain the WWE Championship. The ending of the match also saw a one-off surprise appearance by The Great Khali, who last performed in WWE in November 2014. In other prominent matches, Kevin Owens defeated AJ Styles to win his third United States Championship, John Cena defeated Rusev in a flag match, and in the opening bout, The New Day (Kofi Kingston and Xavier Woods) defeated The Usos (Jey Uso and Jimmy Uso) to win the SmackDown Tag Team Championship.

This was the final Battleground held until 2023. It was originally planned to return as a Raw-exclusive event in 2018, but following WrestleMania 34 in April that year, WWE discontinued brand-exclusive PPV and livestreaming events for the main roster, reducing the amount of these events produced per year, with Battleground's originally planned 2018 date and location given to Extreme Rules. In 2023, Battleground was reinstated as an annual livestreaming event for WWE's developmental brand, NXT.

== Production ==
=== Background ===
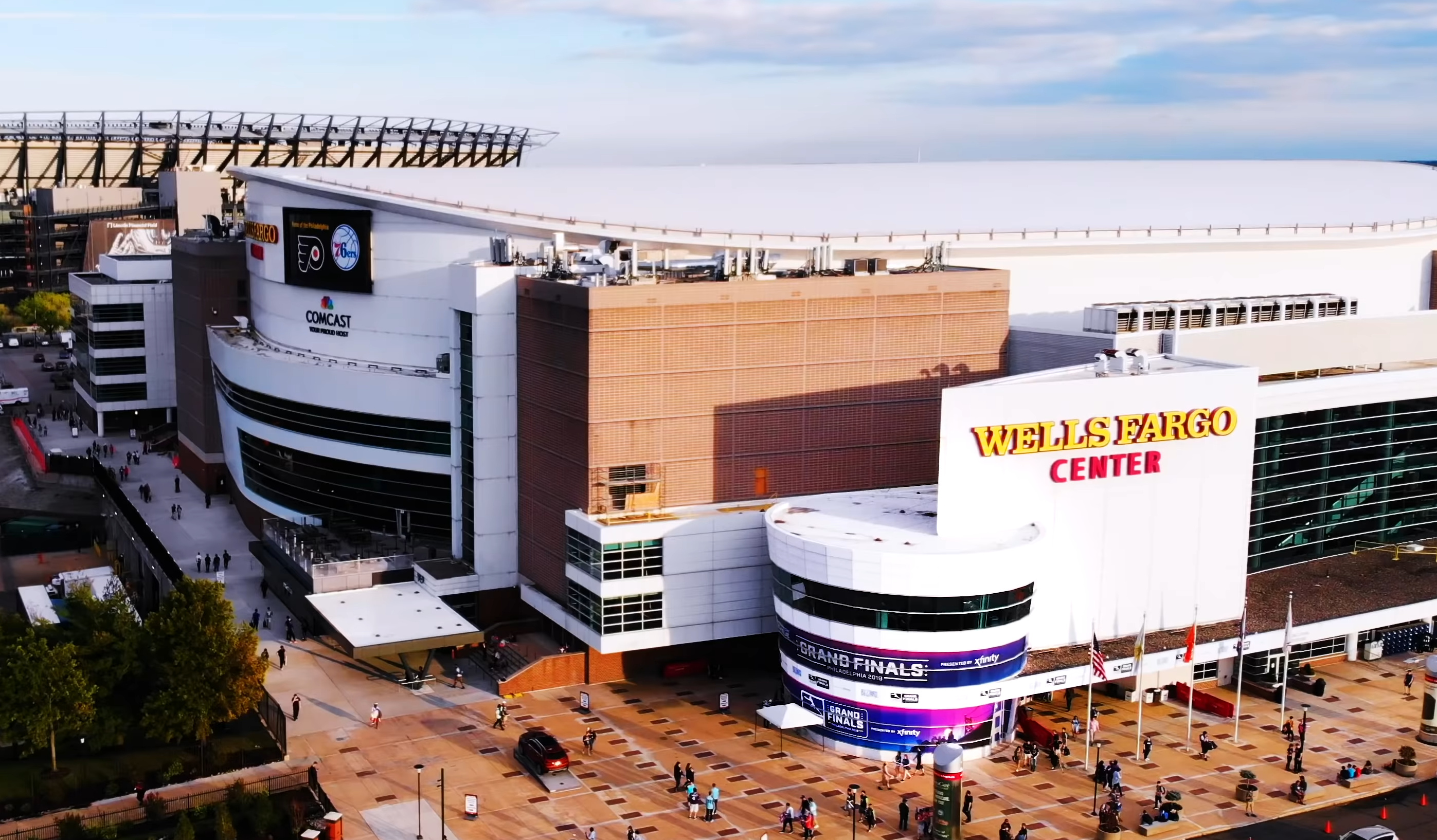
The fifth annual Battleground was held at the Wells Fargo Center in Philadelphia, Pennsylvania.

Battleground was an annual July professional wrestling event established by WWE in 2013, although the original event was held in October. It was originally broadcast exclusively via pay-per-view (PPV) before it began simultaneously livestreaming on the WWE Network in 2014. Announced on March 27, 2017, the fifth event was scheduled to be held on July 23 at the Wells Fargo Center in Philadelphia, Pennsylvania. It exclusively featured wrestlers from the SmackDown brand division. Tickets went on sale on April 22. This was the first Battleground to be brand-exclusive, as although the previous year's event was the first to be held following the reintroduction of the brand extension, it featured wrestlers from both Raw and SmackDown as brand-exclusive PPV and livestreaming events did not begin until after SummerSlam that year.

=== Storylines ===
The event comprised eight matches, including one on the Kickoff pre-show, that resulted from scripted storylines. Results were predetermined by WWE's writers on the SmackDown brand, while storylines were produced on WWE's weekly television show, SmackDown Live.

At Money in the Bank, Jinder Mahal defeated Randy Orton to retain the WWE Championship. On the following episode of SmackDown, Orton explained in a sit-down interview that he lost focus after The Singh Brothers (Samir Singh and Sunil Singh) attempted to attack his father, "Cowboy" Bob Orton, who was seated at ringside for the match. He said that he understood having allies, referencing his time in Evolution, The Legacy, and The Authority, but he would not tolerate people disrespecting his family. He said that he was no longer concerned with becoming a fourteen-time world champion; he only wanted to hurt Mahal. Later that night after Mahal defeated Luke Harper, Orton attacked The Singh Brothers, and then Mahal, who escaped into the crowd. The following week, Orton said that he wanted a rematch for the title and that if he did not receive it, he would continue to attack Mahal anywhere he saw him. Commissioner Shane McMahon, who sympathized with Orton over Mahal and The Singh Brothers disrespecting his family, gave Orton a title rematch at Battleground, but allowed Mahal to choose the stipulation. Mahal chose a Punjabi Prison match, made famous by The Great Khali, marking the third Punjabi Prison match in WWE history and the first since 2007. On the July 4 episode, Orton said that he would punish Mahal in the Punjabi Prison. Mahal responded and said that he would be bringing the Punjabi Prison to SmackDown the following week. That episode, while inside of the Punjabi Prison, The Singh Brothers explained the rules of the match while Mahal said that there would be no escape for Orton. Orton then came out and said that since the two of them would be locked in the prison, Mahal would not be able to have help from The Singh Brothers, who were the reason why Mahal won the title and subsequently retained it beforehand.

At Money in the Bank, The New Day (Big E and Kofi Kingston with Xavier Woods) defeated SmackDown Tag Team Champions The Usos (Jey Uso and Jimmy Uso) by countout, thus The Usos retained. On the following episode of SmackDown, The New Day taunted how The Usos backed out of the match and Big E defeated Jimmy. The following week, after The Usos defeated The Hype Bros (Mojo Rawley and Zack Ryder), preventing them from becoming the number one contenders, The New Day confronted and challenged The Usos to another title match at Battleground, and The Usos accepted. On the July 4 episode, The New Day and The Usos had a rap battle hosted by Wale. The New Day won after The Usos took offense and attacked The New Day. Over the next two weeks, the teams traded wins in singles matches where Woods defeated Jey and Jimmy defeated Kingston.

On the June 20 episode of SmackDown, then-United States Champion Kevin Owens issued a U.S. Championship Open Challenge to any local competitor. AJ Styles came out to accept the challenge, but Owens denied him since Styles was not from Dayton, Ohio. American Alpha's Chad Gable then answered the challenge, claiming he had moved to Dayton "that morning", but Owens retained in the ensuing match. The following week, Styles confronted General Manager Daniel Bryan and said that Owens did not know what an Open Challenge was. Owens interrupted and said that Styles was complaining. Bryan then said that when John Cena hosted the U.S. Championship Open Challenge, it was open to anyone. Bryan decided that for the July 4 episode of SmackDown, there would be an Independence Day Battle Royal, where the winner would face Owens for the United States Championship at Battleground. That episode, Styles defeated Gable to qualify for the battle royal and subsequently won the battle royal. After Styles' victory, Owens, who was seated at ringside, attacked Styles, but Styles fought him off and posed with the title belt. Three days later, despite becoming the number one contender for the title at Battleground, Styles faced Owens at a WWE Live event in Madison Square Garden and defeated him to win the United States Championship. On the following episode of SmackDown, the new champion issued his own U.S. Championship Open Challenge, which was accepted by Cena. Before the match could occur, Owens and Rusev confronted and attacked both Cena and Styles. Styles and Cena defeated Owens and Rusev in a tag team match, and Owens invoked his championship rematch for Battleground. The following week, Styles teamed up with Shinsuke Nakamura in a losing effort against Owens and Baron Corbin.

After WrestleMania 33, John Cena went on a hiatus from WWE to film the second season of the television series American Grit. On the June 6 episode of SmackDown, it was announced that Cena would make his return to the SmackDown brand on the July 4 episode. However, on Raw the following week, it was announced that Cena was a free agent, and had become a free agent during the 2017 WWE Superstar Shake-up. Also during the Superstar Shake-up, Rusev was moved to the SmackDown brand, but at the time, he was out for a shoulder injury that required surgery. Since then, he appeared in a couple of WWE.com videos demanding a WWE Championship match at Money in the Bank, but was not granted his request. On the July 4 episode of SmackDown, Cena made his return and announced that he would appear for both the Raw and SmackDown brands. He was then interrupted by Rusev, making his first appearance for the SmackDown brand. Rusev complained that he did not receive any commercials for his eventual return, unlike Cena, who did. He said that the "American Dream" and the United States were a joke, after which, Cena challenged Rusev to a flag match. Rusev accepted and General Manager Daniel Bryan scheduled the match for Battleground. The following week, Rusev attacked Cena after Cena had accepted AJ Styles' U.S. Championship Open Challenge. On the final SmackDown before Battleground, Cena gave a patriotic speech about the United States and what the U.S. flag meant to the country. He said that at Battleground, the U.S. flag would fly high, after which, Cena retrieved the flag and waved it, but was attacked from behind by Rusev, who applied the Accolade on Cena.

At Money in the Bank, Naomi defeated Lana to retain the SmackDown Women's Championship, and again in two back-to-back rematches on SmackDown. On the July 11 episode, Naomi confronted Commissioner Shane McMahon about who her next opponent would be. Charlotte Flair interrupted and said that she should be the next challenger, followed by Becky Lynch, Tamina, Natalya, and Lana. Shane decided that at Battleground, the five would face each other in a fatal five-way elimination match to determine the number one contender for the SmackDown Women's Championship at SummerSlam. Flair and Lynch then teamed up in a losing effort against Natalya and Tamina due to a distraction from Lana. The following week, Shane gave all five women a pep talk and wanted two of them to face each other that night. Flair stepped up and wanted to face Lana, but ultimately ended up facing Lynch out of suggestion from Natalya. Lynch subsequently defeated Flair, but after the match, they were attacked by Tamina, Lana, and Natalya. Natalya then attacked Tamina, who was then attacked by Lana, and Lana and Tamina had a stare down. Also that episode, Naomi said that besides Lana, whoever wins at Battleground could be her toughest challenge at SummerSlam. She was then interrupted by Carmella, who had won the Women's Money in the Bank ladder match to earn a SmackDown Women's Championship match contract. Carmella said that wherever the champion goes, she goes, and said that she would see Naomi at Battleground.

At Money in the Bank, as Shinsuke Nakamura was making his entrance for the titular Money in the Bank ladder match, he was attacked from behind by Baron Corbin, which took Nakamura out for a majority of the match; Corbin ultimately won and received a contract for a WWE Championship match. On the June 27 episode of SmackDown, after witnessing Corbin defeat Sami Zayn, interviewer Dasha Fuentes asked Nakamura if he would like a one-on-one match with Mr. Money in the Bank. Nakamura replied that although Corbin was dangerous, he was afraid of Nakamura. Backstage the following week, as Fuentes attempted to have another interview with Nakamura, Corbin attacked Nakamura with his Money in the Bank briefcase and said that he was not scared of Nakamura. The two were set to have a match on the July 11 episode, but the two fought before the match, and their match was rescheduled for Battleground. The following week, Nakamura teamed up with AJ Styles to face Corbin and Kevin Owens. As Nakamura made his entrance, he was again attacked from behind by Corbin, and Corbin and Owens defeated Nakamura and Styles.

At Money in the Bank, Maria Kanellis returned to WWE in her first appearance since February 2010, along with her husband Mike Kanellis, who made his debut appearance for WWE. The couple cut a promo about the "power of love" before departing. On the June 27 episode of SmackDown, they again came out to talk about the "power of love". Mid-promo, they were interrupted by Sami Zayn, who made his entrance for his match against Baron Corbin, much to the dismay of Maria. Backstage on the July 11 episode, Maria was in search for Zayn as she wanted an apology from him. Later, Zayn found Maria and Mike and said that he had already apologized twice. He then called out Mike as Mike had yet to have a match since coming to WWE. In response, Maria slapped Zayn and Mike smashed a glass vase on his head. The following week, Zayn lost to Mike in Mike's WWE in-ring debut match, and a rematch was scheduled for Battleground.

On the Backlash Kickoff pre-show, Tye Dillinger defeated Aiden English. On July 18, a rematch between the two was scheduled for the Battleground Kickoff pre-show.

== Event ==
Other on-screen personnel
Role:	Name:
English commentators	Tom Phillips
English commentators	John "Bradshaw" Layfield
English commentators	Byron Saxton
Spanish commentators	Carlos Cabrera
Spanish commentators	Marcelo Rodríguez
German commentators	Tim Haber
German commentators	Calvin Knie
Ring announcer	Greg Hamilton
Referees	Danilo Anfibio
Referees	Jason Ayers
Referees	Mike Chioda
Referees	Dan Engler
Referees	Charles Robinson
Referees	Ryan Tran
Backstage interviewers	Dasha Fuentes
Backstage interviewers	Kayla Braxton
Backstage interviewers	Tom Phillips
Pre-show panel	Renee Young
Pre-show panel	Jerry Lawler
Pre-show panel	Sam Roberts
Pre-show panel	David Otunga
Talking Smack panel	Renee Young
Talking Smack panel	Jerry Lawler

=== Pre-show ===
During the Battleground Kickoff pre-show, Tye Dillinger faced Aiden English. In the climax, English performed the "Director's Cut" on Dillinger to win the match.

=== Preliminary matches ===
The actual pay-per-view opened with The Usos defending the SmackDown Tag Team Championship against The New Day (Kofi Kingston and Xavier Woods with Big E). In the end, Kingston performed "Trouble in Paradise" on Jimmy, which was followed by Woods performing a ropewalk elbow drop on Jimmy to win the titles. This marked the first time that Woods scored a pinfall to win a championship in WWE.

Next, Shinsuke Nakamura faced Baron Corbin. Corbin executed the "Deep Six" on Nakamura for a nearfall. In the end, Corbin attacked Nakamura with a low blow, thus Nakamura won the match via disqualification. After the match, Corbin struck Nakamura with his Money in the Bank briefcase and attacked him with the "End of Days".

After that was the fatal five-way elimination match to determine the number one contender for Naomi's SmackDown Women's Championship at SummerSlam which featured Charlotte Flair, Becky Lynch, Tamina, Natalya, and Lana. After Lynch forced Tamina to submit to the "Dis-arm-her", eliminating Tamina, she forced Lana to submit to the "Dis-arm-her" immediately afterwards, eliminating Lana. Natalya then pinned Lynch with a roll-up whilst holding her tights, eliminating Lynch. After performing a roll-up into the corner on Flair, Natalya pinned Flair to win the match. After the match, Naomi, who was on commentary during the match, offered a handshake, with Natalya refusing and departing.

In the fourth match, AJ Styles defended the United States Championship against Kevin Owens. In the end, as Owens and Styles traded counters, Styles applied a crossface on Owens, who shifted his weight on Styles into a pin to win the title for a third time. (The intended finish of the match was to have Styles retain the title but the ending was botched.)

Next, John Cena faced Rusev in a flag match. Towards the end, Cena attempted an "Attitude Adjustment" on Rusev, who countered into a Jumping Sidekick and applied the "Accolade" on him. Cena managed to fight back and executed an "Attitude Adjustment" through two tables on the stage on Rusev. Cena then planted the U.S flag firmly in place to win the match.

After that, Mike Kanellis (with Maria Kanellis) faced Sami Zayn. In the end, Maria distracted Zayn and Mike tried to take advantage. However, Zayn countered and performed an exploder suplex into the turnbuckles followed by a "Helluva Kick" on Mike to win the match.

=== Main event ===
In the main event, Jinder Mahal defended the WWE Championship against Randy Orton in the third-ever Punjabi Prison match. Orton and Mahal went back and forth, preventing each other from escaping three of the doors of the inner cage. Orton called for the fourth door to be opened and then performed an "RKO" on Mahal, but The Singh Brothers appeared from under the ring and pulled Mahal out of the door, forcing Orton to climb over the inner cage. After Orton escaped the inner cage, he prevented Mahal from climbing over the outer cage and fought off The Singh Brothers, including knocking Samir (who went outside of the cage) off of the cage through an announce table. Orton then attacked Sunil and Mahal with a steel chair before attempting to climb the outer cage. Mid-way up, Mahal's music played and The Great Khali appeared for the first time since 2014. Khali climbed the cage and choked Orton, allowing Mahal to escape the outer structure and retain the WWE Championship.

== Reception ==
Battleground 2017 was viewed as one of the weakest PPVs of the year, with Dave Meltzer calling it the worst pay-per-view of the year in his Anti-Slammy Awards of 2017. The event was also ranked as the second-worst pay-per-view of 2017 by wrestling channel Cultaholic in their 2020 ranking of every 2017 PPV Ranked From Worst To Best, only behind Fastlane.

The highest rated match, as per Meltzer's ratings, was The New Day vs. The Usos, which was rated 3.5 stars. The flag match was rated 3 stars, the five-way women's match was rated 2.5 stars, Nakamura vs. Corbin was rated 1.5 stars, the same rating as Aiden English vs. Tye Dillinger, and Owens vs. Styles was rated 3.25 stars. Zayn vs. Kanellis was rated 2 stars. The main event received the lowest rating at 0.75 stars.

== Aftermath ==
On the following episode of SmackDown, WWE Champion Jinder Mahal demanded a new opponent for SummerSlam. John Cena confronted and congratulated Mahal, and then challenged him for the WWE Championship. However, General Manager Daniel Bryan came out and informed Cena that he had to earn his opportunity and scheduled a number one contender's match for the following week between Cena and Shinsuke Nakamura, who had defeated Baron Corbin in a rematch from Battleground. Nakamura defeated Cena to become the number one contender. Corbin attacked Nakamura after the match, but Cena put Corbin through the announcer's table with an Attitude Adjustment; a match between Cena and Corbin was scheduled for SummerSlam. Also, Rusev issued a SummerSlam "Open Challenge" that was accepted by Randy Orton.

Also that episode, AJ Styles attempted to invoke his United States Championship rematch against Kevin Owens, but was interrupted by the returning Chris Jericho, who also wanted to invoke his rematch from when he lost the title to Owens back in May. As both Styles and Jericho were contractually owed rematches, Commissioner Shane McMahon scheduled a triple threat match for the title between the three that Styles won by pinning Jericho. Immediately after, Owens invoked his title rematch for the following week, but lost, and a rematch was scheduled for SummerSlam with Shane as the special guest referee.

As The New Day were about to make their way to the ring to celebrate on becoming SmackDown Tag Team Champions, they were attacked by The Usos. The following week, The Usos proclaimed that they would reclaim the titles from The New Day, and a rematch was scheduled for SummerSlam. The match was later scheduled for the Kickoff pre-show.

Sami Zayn teamed up with Tye Dillinger where the two defeated Mike Kanellis and Aiden English. The following week, Zayn was defeated by English, and the Kannellises mocked him for it.

A Raw-exclusive Battleground was originally planned to be held on July 15, 2018, in Pittsburgh, Pennsylvania, but following WrestleMania 34 that year, brand-exclusive PPV and livestreaming events were discontinued for the main roster, reducing the amount of these events produced per year. As a result, the originally planned 2018 Battleground was canceled with its date and location given to Extreme Rules. Six years later on March 30, 2023, WWE reinstated Battleground as a livestreaming event for its developmental brand, NXT.

== Results ==
No.	Results	Stipulations	Times
1^{P}	Aiden English defeated Tye Dillinger by pinfall	Singles match	9:45
2	The New Day (Kofi Kingston and Xavier Woods) (with Big E) defeated The Usos (Jey Uso and Jimmy Uso) (c) by pinfall	Tag team match for the WWE SmackDown Tag Team Championship	13:50
3	Shinsuke Nakamura defeated Baron Corbin by disqualification	Singles match	12:25
4	Natalya defeated Becky Lynch, Charlotte Flair, Lana, and Tamina	Fatal five-way elimination match to determine the #1 contender for the WWE SmackDown Women's Championship at SummerSlam	11:00
5	Kevin Owens defeated AJ Styles (c) by pinfall	Singles match for the WWE United States Championship	17:50
6	John Cena defeated Rusev	Flag match	21:10
7	Sami Zayn defeated Mike Kanellis (with Maria Kanellis) by pinfall	Singles match	7:15
8	Jinder Mahal (c) (with The Singh Brothers) defeated Randy Orton	Punjabi Prison match for the WWE Championship	27:40
(c) / – the champion(s) heading into the match; P / – the match was broadcast on the pre-show

=== Fatal 5-Way elimination match ===
Eliminated	Wrestler	Eliminated by	Method of elimination	Time
1	Tamina	Becky Lynch	Submitted to the Dis-arm-her	8:08
2	Lana	Becky Lynch	Submitted to the Dis-arm-her	8:27
3	Becky Lynch	Natalya	Pinned with a roll-up	8:40
4	Charlotte Flair	Natalya	Pinned after a roll-up to the bottom turnbuckle	11:00
Winner	Natalya			11:00
