= NXT TakeOver: Brooklyn II =

2016 WWE Network event

- Promotional poster featuring Samoa Joe, Shinsuke Nakamura, Asuka, and Bayley
- Promotion: WWE
- Brand: NXT
- Date: August 20, 2016
- City: Brooklyn, New York
- Venue: Barclays Center
- Attendance: 15,671

WWE event chronology
← Previous; Battleground	Next → SummerSlam

NXT TakeOver chronology
← Previous; The End	Next → Toronto

NXT TakeOver: Brooklyn chronology
← Previous; I	Next → III

NXT TakeOver: Brooklyn II was a 2016 professional wrestling livestreaming event produced by WWE, held exclusively for wrestlers from the promotion's developmental brand, NXT. It was the 11th NXT TakeOver event and the second annual TakeOver: Brooklyn. It took place on Saturday, August 20, 2016, at the Barclays Center in Brooklyn, New York and aired exclusively on the WWE Network. The event was held as part of that year's SummerSlam weekend, and was the second of four consecutive TakeOver: Brooklyn events to take place at the arena.

Eight matches were contested at the event, including two taped for future episodes of NXT. In the main event, Shinsuke Nakamura defeated Samoa Joe to capture the NXT Championship. The event is notable for the in-ring debuts of Ember Moon and Bobby Roode. It was also Bayley's last match in NXT before she was moved to the main roster on the Raw brand.

== Production ==
=== Background ===
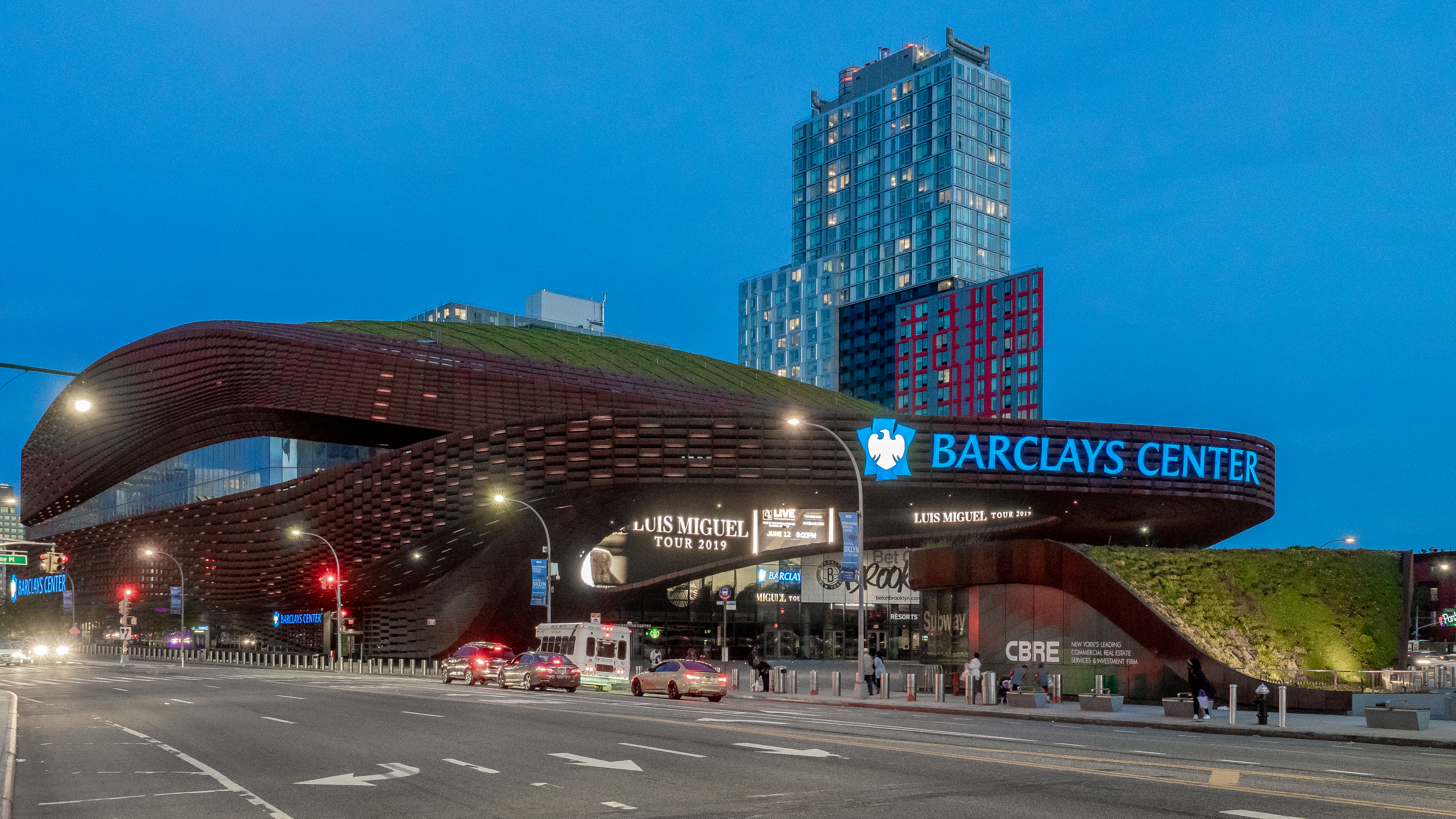
The 11th NXT TakeOver event was the second annual TakeOver: Brooklyn held at the Barclays Center in Brooklyn, New York.

TakeOver was a series of professional wrestling events that began in May 2014, as WWE's developmental brand, NXT, held its second WWE Network-exclusive livestreaming event, billed as TakeOver. The "TakeOver" moniker subsequently became the branding for all of NXT's major events held periodically throughout the year. In 2015, NXT held TakeOver: Brooklyn, which took place at the Barclays Center in Brooklyn, New York and was a support show for that year's SummerSlam for the main roster. Announced on September 28, 2015, a second Brooklyn event, titled Brooklyn II, was scheduled to be held on Saturday, August 20, 2016, at the same venue and also as a support show for that year's SummerSlam. Brooklyn II was the 11th TakeOver event and in turn established TakeOver: Brooklyn as an annual subseries of TakeOvers that were held at the Barclays Center as support shows for WWE's annual SummerSlam. Tickets went on sale on June 11 through Ticketmaster.

=== Storylines ===
The card included matches that resulted from scripted storylines. Results were predetermined by WWE's writers on the NXT brand, while storylines were produced on WWE's weekly television program, NXT.

On the July 27 episode of NXT, NXT General Manager William Regal named Shinsuke Nakamura the number one contender to face Samoa Joe for the NXT Championship at TakeOver: Brooklyn II. Joe, unhappy with his opponent, first refused to face Nakamura and requested a different opponent but obliged after Regal threatened to strip him of the title.

At TakeOver: Dallas, Asuka defeated Bayley for the NXT Women's Championship by submission when Bayley passed out. On the May 18 episode of NXT, Nia Jax defeated Bayley and kayfabe injured the former. At TakeOver: The End, Jax, who was replacing Bayley, was defeated by Asuka. Bayley returned on the June 22 episode, where she defeated Deonna Purrazzo. In the following weeks, tensions between Asuka and Bayley escalated before a match was scheduled between the two at TakeOver Brooklyn II. On the August 3 episode, after Asuka won her match, Bayley, who was sitting at ringside after being offered a chair by Asuka, got in the ring after Asuka kept Aliyah in her signature Asuka Lock. On the August 10 episode, Asuka and Bayley signed their match contract.

On the August 3 episode of NXT, a vignette aired of Ember Moon's upcoming debut at TakeOver: Brooklyn II. On the August 17 episode, Billie Kay guilted general manager William Regal into putting her into the match against Ember Moon.

On the August 3 episode of NXT, Bobby Roode made his NXT TV debut. The following week, after Andrade Cien Almas defeated Angelo Dawkins, Roode informed Almas that General Manager William Regal scheduled a match between the two at TakeOver: Brooklyn II.

== Event ==
Other on-screen personnel
Role	Name
Commentators	Tom Phillips
Commentators	Corey Graves
Ring announcer	Greg Hamilton
Pre-show panel	Renee Young
Pre-show panel	Lita
Pre-show panel	Mauro Ranallo
Referees	Rod Zapata
Referees	Eddie Orengo
Referees	Danilo Anfibio

=== Preliminary matches ===
In the first match, No Way Jose faced Austin Aries. Aries forced Jose to submit to the Last Chancery to win the match. After the match, Aries applied the "Last Chancery" on Jose once again until he was interrupted by Hideo Itami. Itami attacked Aries with a "Go To Sleep" and walked off.

Next, Billie Kay faced Ember Moon. In the end, Moon executed an Eclipse on Kay to win the match.

After that, Bobby Roode faced Andrade Cien Almas. The match ended after Roode performed a "Glorious Bomb" on Almas to win the match.

In the fourth match, The Revival (Scott Dawson and Dash Wilder) defended the NXT Tag Team Championship against Johnny Gargano and Tommaso Ciampa. The match ended after Dawson forced Gargano to submit to an inverted figure-four leglock to retain the titles.

In the fifth match, Asuka defended the NXT Women's Championship against Bayley. During the match, Asuka applied the "Asuka Lock" on Bayley, who fought out of the hold. Asuka then performed a spin kick on Bayley to retain the title. After the match, Bayley received a standing ovation from the crowd.

=== Main event ===
In the main event, Samoa Joe defended the NXT Championship against Shinsuke Nakamura. During the match, Joe executed a muscle buster on Nakamura for a near-fall. Nakamura performed a "Kinshasa" on Joe for a near-fall. In the climax, Nakamura executed another "Kinshasa" off the middle rope on Joe, followed by a third "Kinshasa" to win the title.

== Results ==
No.	Results	Stipulations	Times
1^{N}	Tye Dillinger defeated Wesley Blake by pinfall	Singles match	9:12
2^{N}	Authors of Pain (Akam and Rezar) defeated TM-61 (Nick Miller and Shane Thorne) by pinfall	Tag team match	6:55
3	Austin Aries defeated No Way Jose by submission	Singles match	10:42
4	Ember Moon defeated Billie Kay by pinfall	Singles match	4:35
5	Bobby Roode defeated Andrade "Cien" Almas by pinfall	Singles match	10:22
6	The Revival (Dash Wilder and Scott Dawson) (c) defeated #DIY (Johnny Gargano and Tommaso Ciampa) by submission	Tag team match for the NXT Tag Team Championship	19:10
7	Asuka (c) defeated Bayley by pinfall	Singles match for the NXT Women's Championship	14:07
8	Shinsuke Nakamura defeated Samoa Joe (c) by pinfall	Singles match for the NXT Championship	21:14
(c) / – the champion(s) heading into the match; N / – the match was taped for a future broadcast of NXT
