= Battleground (2016) =

WWE pay-per-view and livestreaming event

- Promotional poster featuring John Cena
- Promotion: WWE
- Brand(s): Raw; SmackDown
- Date: July 24, 2016
- City: Washington, D.C.
- Venue: Verizon Center
- Attendance: 15,109

WWE event chronology
← Previous; Money in the Bank	Next → NXT TakeOver: Brooklyn II

Battleground chronology
← Previous; 2015	Next → 2017

The 2016 Battleground (also known as Battlefield in Germany) was a professional wrestling pay-per-view (PPV) and livestreaming event produced by WWE, held for wrestlers from the promotion's main roster brands, Raw and SmackDown. It was the fourth annual Battleground and took place on July 24, 2016, at the Verizon Center in Washington, D.C. This was the last event to feature WWE's full main roster before the reinstated brand extension went into full effect, excluding the "Big Four" (Royal Rumble, WrestleMania, SummerSlam, and Survivor Series), as after the following month's SummerSlam, monthly PPV and livestreaming events became brand-exclusive until WrestleMania 34 in April 2018 when brand-exclusive PPV and livestreaming events were again discontinued.

Nine matches were contested at the event, including one match on the Kickoff pre-show. In addition to the regular matches, the event determined the home brand of the WWE Championship, the Intercontinental Championship, and the United States Championship. The WWE Women's Championship and WWE Tag Team Championship were not defended at the event and automatically became exclusive to Raw by default due to their respective champions being drafted to the brand in the 2016 WWE Draft that was held just prior to this event. These two championships were subsequently renamed after other championships were later established so that each brand had a men's world championship, a women's world championship, a secondary male championship, and a male tag team championship.

In the main event, SmackDown's Dean Ambrose retained the WWE Championship in a triple threat match against his former Shield teammates, Seth Rollins and Roman Reigns, both of whom had been drafted to Raw, thus keeping the championship on SmackDown; shortly after the event, the title was renamed as the WWE World Championship. Also, Raw's Rusev defeated SmackDown's Zack Ryder to keep the United States Championship on Raw, while the match between SmackDown's The Miz and Raw's Darren Young for the Intercontinental Championship ended in a double disqualification, thus Miz retained as titles do not change hands on disqualification unless stipulated, in turn keeping the title on SmackDown. The show was also notable for Randy Orton's first appearance after a nine-month injury, as well as Bayley's main roster debut.

== Production ==
=== Background ===
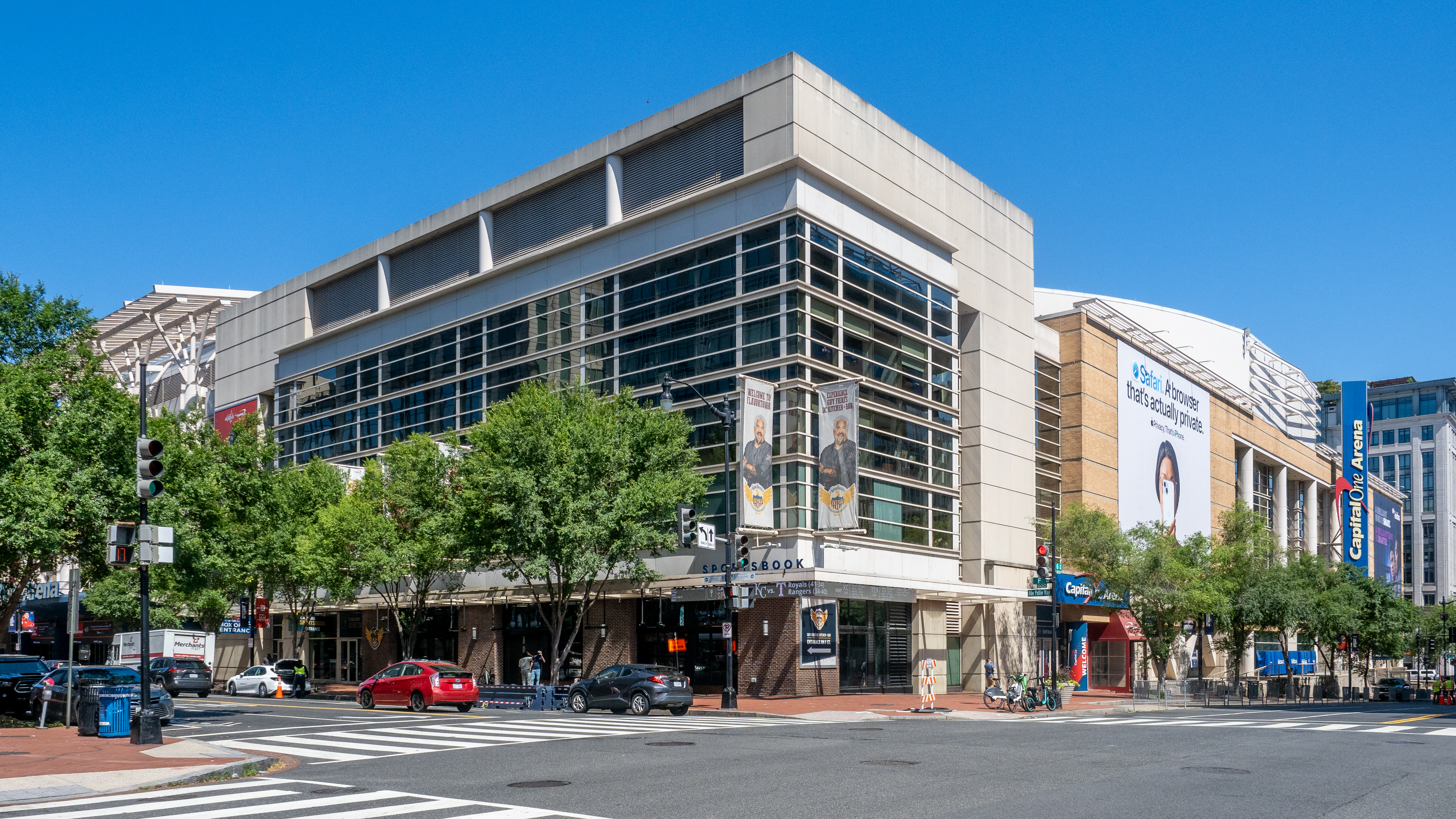
The fourth annual Battleground was held at the Verizon Center in Washington, D.C.

Battleground was an annual July professional wrestling event established by WWE in 2013, although the original event was held in October. It was originally broadcast exclusively via pay-per-view (PPV) before it began simultaneously livestreaming on the WWE Network in 2014. Announced on March 27, 2016, the fourth event was scheduled to take place on July 24, 2016, at the Verizon Center in Washington, D.C. Tickets went on sale on April 9 through Ticketmaster.

This was WWE's first PPV and livestreaming event to be held after the reintroduction the brand extension earlier in July, where the promotion again split its main roster into two separate brands, Raw and SmackDown, where wrestlers were exclusively assigned to perform. However, excluding the "Big Four" (Royal Rumble, WrestleMania, SummerSlam, and Survivor Series), the 2016 Battleground was the final monthly PPV and livestreaming event to feature the full main roster, as after SummerSlam the following month, these monthly events became brand-exclusive.

=== Storylines ===
The event comprised nine matches, including one on the Kickoff pre-show, that resulted from scripted storylines. Results were predetermined by WWE's writers, while storylines were produced on WWE's weekly television shows, Raw and SmackDown.

At Money in the Bank, Dean Ambrose won the Money in the Bank ladder match and subsequently the WWE World Heavyweight Championship by cashing in his contract on Seth Rollins, who had just won the title from Roman Reigns. After a #1 contender's match between Reigns and Rollins ended in a double countout the next night on Raw, Ambrose requested to defend the title against both Reigns and Rollins. Accordingly, Shane McMahon scheduled a triple threat match between all three men for the WWE World Heavyweight Championship at Battleground. On June 21, two days after Money in the Bank, Reigns was suspended for 30 days for violating WWE's Wellness Program, which uses drug testing to detect substance abuse. Pro Wrestling Torch reported that WWE knew of the violation before Money in the Bank, leading to Reigns losing his world title at the event. With Reigns's suspension ending before Battleground, WWE continued to advertise Reigns as part of the Battleground main event. On the June 27 episode of Raw, both Rollins and Ambrose acknowledged Reigns's suspension on television. However, Stephanie McMahon opted not to remove Reigns from the Battleground match, and instead gave AJ Styles and John Cena the opportunity to qualify for the match by matches against Ambrose and Rollins. Styles and Cena lost when they each interfered in each other's matches. On June 27, the WWE World Heavyweight Championship was renamed as the WWE Championship. The WWE brand extension was then reinstated with Stephanie McMahon named Commissioner of Raw and Shane McMahon named Commissioner of SmackDown. On July 18, a match for the WWE Championship between Ambrose and Rollins ended in both men pinning each other simultaneously. While Raw commissioner Stephanie McMahon declared Rollins the new champion, the referee ruled the match a draw, with Ambrose retaining the title. The next day on SmackDown, Ambrose defeated Rollins in a rematch to retain the title. The same night, the 2016 WWE draft took place and Ambrose was drafted to SmackDown, while Reigns and Rollins were drafted to Raw.

In December 2014, at NXT TakeOver: R Evolution, Sami Zayn won the NXT Championship from Neville. After the match, Zayn's friend Kevin Owens, first congratulated and then attacked him. In February 2015, at NXT TakeOver: Rival, Owens defeated Zayn to win the NXT Championship. Zayn moved to WWE's main roster at the Royal Rumble and eliminated Owens from the Royal Rumble match. At Payback, Owens defeated Zayn. At Money in the Bank, both men failed to win the Money in the Bank ladder match. Zayn defeated Owens on the June 20 episode of Raw, and challenged Owens to another match a week later during Chris Jericho's Highlight Reel, which Owens accepted.

At Money in the Bank, Natalya and Becky Lynch lost a tag team match. After the match, Natalya turned heel and attacked Lynch. Natalya attacked Lynch again the following night on Raw, and proclaimed to be solely looking out for herself. On the June 27 episode of Raw, Lynch attacked Natalya, who was on commentary, before her match against Summer Rae. On the July 4 episode of Raw, a match between the two was scheduled for Battleground.

At Money in the Bank, AJ Styles defeated John Cena after The Club (Luke Gallows and Karl Anderson) interfered, executing a Magic Killer on Cena. The following night on Raw, Styles and Gallows attacked Cena during his match against Anderson. On the June 27 episode of Raw, Cena and Styles cost each other a chance to be involved in the WWE Championship match at Battleground and then Gallows and Anderson delivered a Magic Killer to Cena on the ramp. On the July 4 episode of Raw, The Club again attacked Cena after Styles told Cena that no WWE Superstar will come out to help him. However Styles was wrong when Enzo Amore and Big Cass saved Cena. Later that night, a six-man tag team match was made between the two teams at Battleground.

On the July 11 episode of Raw, Darren Young won a battle royal to earn a title match against Intercontinental Champion The Miz at Battleground.

On the July 7 episode of SmackDown, Zack Ryder won a match against Sheamus and then challenged Rusev to a WWE United States Championship match. On the July 11 episode of Raw, Rusev attacked Ryder after his match against Sheamus and accepted Ryder's challenge for Battleground.

On the June 20 episode of Raw, The Wyatt Family (Bray Wyatt, Braun Strowman, and Erick Rowan) returned and were interrupted by WWE Tag Team Champions The New Day (Kofi Kingston, Xavier Woods, and Big E). The two teams addressed each other in their promos over the next few weeks. On the July 4 episode of Raw, The Wyatt Family invited The New Day to their family compound, which New Day accepted. The next week on Raw, The New Day showed up at the compound and both teams brawled until New Day ran away. On July 12, a six-man tag team between both teams was scheduled for Battleground.

After her return in early June, Sasha Banks reignited her feud with Charlotte, who had formed a tag team with Dana Brooke while Banks was on hiatus. On the June 20 episode of Raw, Banks rescued Paige from an attack from Brooke and Charlotte. On the June 27 episode of Raw, Banks and Paige defeated Brooke and Charlotte. Over the following weeks, Charlotte and Brooke continued to provoke Banks. Hoping to earn a title match with Charlotte, Banks defeated Brooke on the July 11 episode of Raw and again on the July 14 episode of SmackDown. Later that night, Charlotte and Brooke were scheduled to wrestle Banks and a mystery partner at Battleground.

After Randy Orton was revealed as Brock Lesnar's opponent for SummerSlam, he was announced as the guest of a special episode of Chris Jericho's The Highlight Reel at Battleground.

On July 22, a match pitting The Usos (Jey Uso and Jimmy Uso) against Breezango (Tyler Breeze and Fandango) was scheduled for the Battleground Kickoff pre-show.

== Event ==
Other on-screen personnel
Role:	Name:
English commentators	Michael Cole (PPV)
English commentators	John "Bradshaw" Layfield (PPV)
English commentators	Byron Saxton (PPV + Pre-show)
English commentators	Mauro Ranallo (Pre-show)
Spanish commentators	Carlos Cabrera
Spanish commentators	Marcelo Rodríguez
German commentators	Carsten Schaefer
German commentators	Sebastian Hackl
Ring announcers	Greg Hamilton
Ring announcers	JoJo
Backstage interviewer	Tom Phillips
Pre-show panel	Renee Young
Pre-show panel	Booker T
Pre-show panel	Corey Graves
Pre-show panel	Jerry Lawler

=== Pre-show ===
During the Battleground Kickoff pre-show, Breezango (Tyler Breeze and Fandango) squared off against The Usos (Jey Uso and Jimmy Uso). The match ended when Jimmy attempted a Samoan Splash on Breeze but Breeze countered and pinned Jimmy with a small package for the win.

=== Preliminary matches ===
The actual pay per-view opened with WWE Women's Champion Charlotte and Dana Brooke facing Sasha Banks and her mystery partner, who was revealed as Bayley. In the end, Banks forced Charlotte to submit to the Bank Statement to win the match.

Next, The Wyatt Family (Bray Wyatt, Erick Rowan, and Braun Strowman) faced WWE Tag Team Champions The New Day (Big E, Kofi Kingston, and Xavier Woods) in a six-man tag team match. In the climax of the match, Big E executed a Spear on Strowman, who was standing on the apron. Woods was shocked into retreating by Wyatt's signature spiderwalk. Wyatt then executed Sister Abigail on Woods for the win.

After that, Rusev defended the United States Championship against Zack Ryder. The match ended when Ryder executed a Rough Ryder on Rusev and attempted an Elbow Drop, but Rusev countered the move and executed a Jumping Sidekick to the back of Ryder's head. Rusev forced Ryder to submit to The Accolade to retain the title. After the match, Rusev attacked Ryder until Ryder's NXT tag team partner, Mojo Rawley, came out. Rusev avoided a confrontation and left the ring.

In the fourth match, Kevin Owens faced Sami Zayn. Zayn executed a Blue Thunder Bomb on Owens for a near-fall. Zayn executed a Brainbuster on the ring apron on Owens. Owens executed a Bullfrog Splash on Zayn for a near-fall. Zayn executed two Half and Half Suplexes for a near-fall. Owens countered a Helluva Kick into a Pop-Up Powerbomb but Zayn placed his foot on the rope to void the pinfall. In the end, Owens implored Zayn to stay down but Zayn executed an Exploder Suplex into the turnbuckles and a Half and Half Suplex, followed by two Helluva Kicks to win the match.

Next, Natalya faced Becky Lynch. The end came after Natalya kicked Lynch's right kneecap and applied the Sharpshooter. Lynch eventually submitted, thus Natalya won the match.

After that, The Miz (accompanied by his wife, Maryse) defended the Intercontinental Championship against Darren Young (accompanied by Bob Backlund). The match ended when Maryse pretended to fall as if Backlund had attacked her, causing Miz to shove Backlund. Young then applied the Crossface Chickenwing on Miz outside the ring. The referees separated the two wrestlers and ruled the match a double disqualification.

In the next match, John Cena teamed with Enzo Amore and Big Cass to face The Club (Karl Anderson, Luke Gallows, and AJ Styles) in a six-man tag team match. In the end, Cena executed a Super Attitude Adjustment on Styles to win the match.

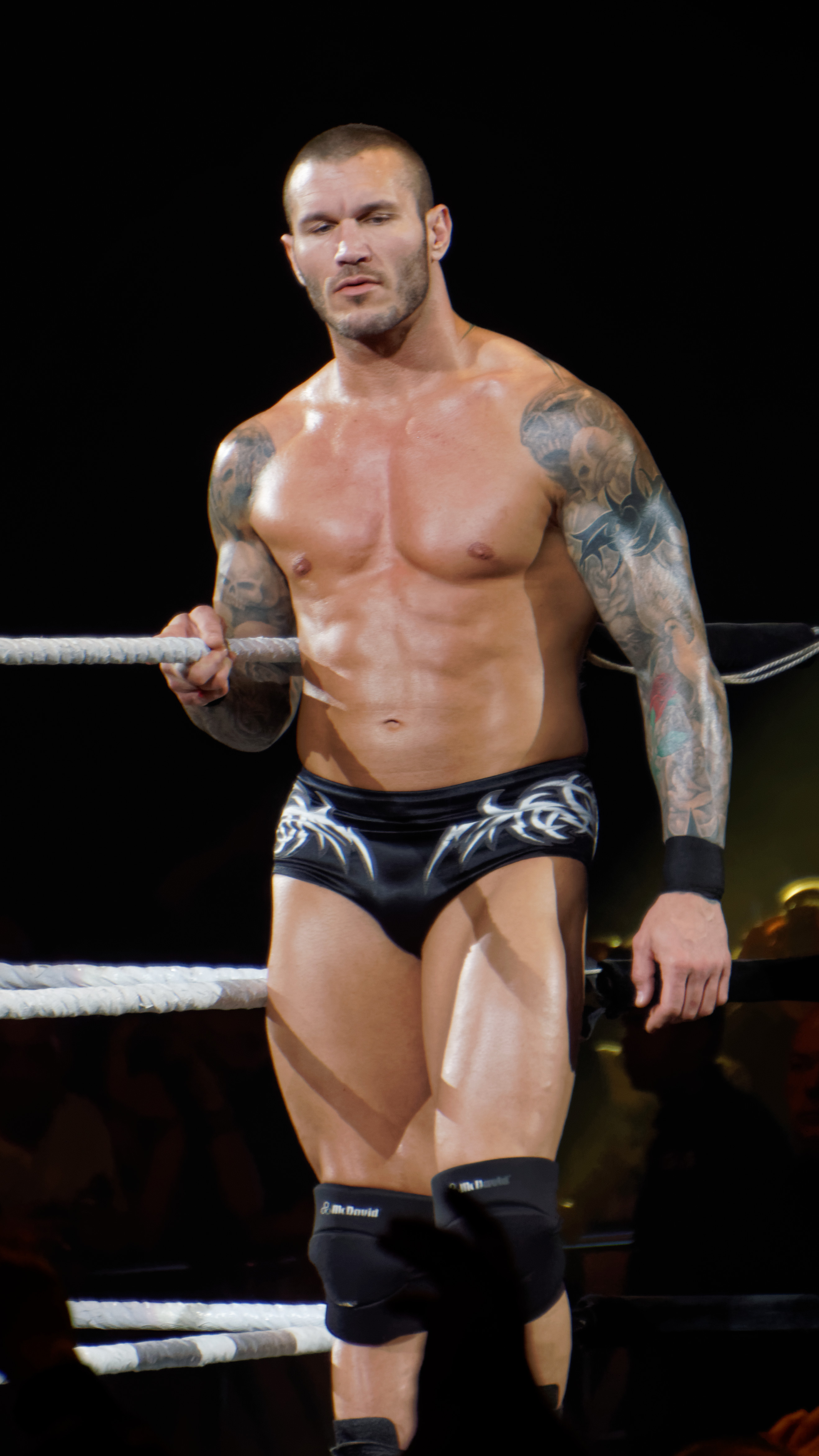
Randy Orton made his return after a nine-month injury.

Chris Jericho then hosted the Highlight Reel with Randy Orton, who made his first appearance following a nine-month injury. Jericho constantly berated Orton's behavior ahead of his upcoming match at SummerSlam against Brock Lesnar (including a video of Lesnar showing his feats of strength) to provoke Orton into attacking him, eventually resulting in Orton attacking him with an RKO.

=== Main event ===
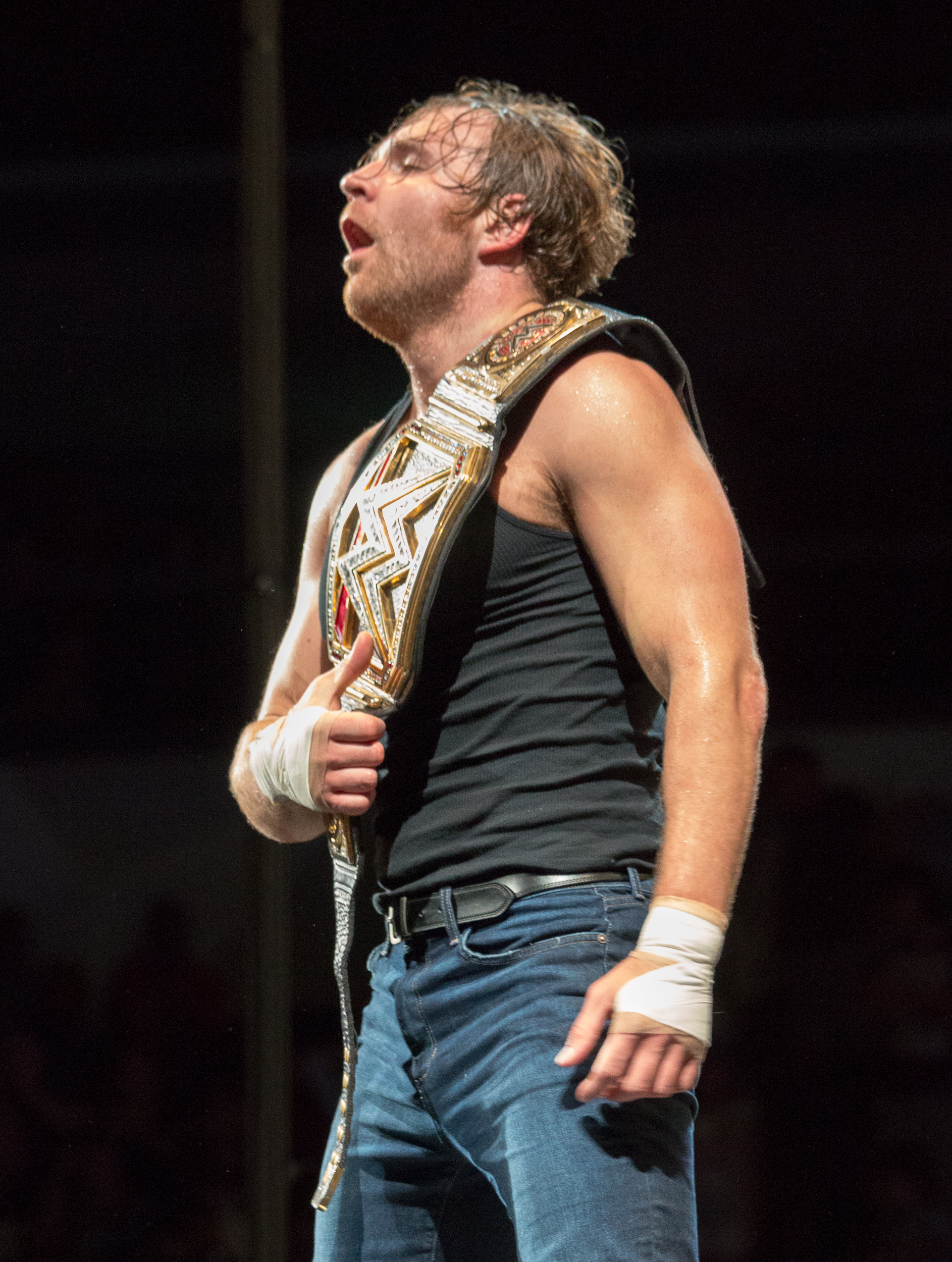
SmackDown's Dean Ambrose defended the WWE Championship against his former Shield teammates Roman Reigns and Seth Rollins, both of whom were drafted to Raw, in the main event that determined the home brand of the title.

In the main event, Dean Ambrose defended the WWE Championship against Seth Rollins and Roman Reigns. During the match, Ambrose and Rollins teamed up to attack Reigns, performing a Double Powerbomb on Reigns through a broadcast table to temporarily take him out of the match. In the climax of the match, Rollins executed a Pedigree on Reigns for a near-fall. Rollins executed a Turnbuckle Powerbomb on Reigns, who delivered a Superman Punch and a Spear to Rollins. Ambrose pinned Reigns after Dirty Deeds to retain the championship. The entire SmackDown roster came out to celebrate with Ambrose as the event ended.

== Reception ==
Battleground 2016 received mixed to positive reviews, with Dave Meltzer's reviews reflecting this: Breezango vs. The Usos was rated 2.75 stars, the women's tag team match was rated 2 stars, The New Day vs. The Wyatt Family was rated 3.25 stars (the same rating received by Natalya vs. Becky Lynch), the United States Title Match was rated 2.25 stars, Cena's match was rated 3.5 stars, Kevin Owens vs. Sami Zayn was rated 4.5 stars, the highest of the event's matches, and the main event received 4 stars. The lowest rated match of the event was the Intercontinental Title match, which received a very low 1.5 stars.

Cultaholic Wrestling ranked the event at No. 1 in their 2020 ranking of every 2016 PPV Ranked from Worst to Best.

== Aftermath ==
With the return of brand-exclusive PPV and livestreaming events after SummerSlam, the following year's Battleground was held exclusively for wrestlers from the SmackDown brand. Brand-exclusive PPV and livestreaming events would last until WrestleMania 34 in 2018, after which, they were discontinued.

=== Raw ===
Dean Ambrose retaining the WWE Championship at the event left Raw without a world title. On the following episode of Raw, commissioner Stephanie McMahon and General manager Mick Foley announced a new world title for Raw, the WWE Universal Championship; the WWE Championship was then renamed to WWE World Championship. As Raw's number one draft pick and due to not being pinned in the triple threat match at Battleground, Seth Rollins was named a contender to the title, and his opponent was determined in two fatal four-way matches. Finn Bálor, in his debut match on the main roster, won the first, while Roman Reigns won the second. Later that night, Bálor became the second contender by defeating Reigns, and he was scheduled to face Rollins to determine the inaugural Universal Champion at SummerSlam.

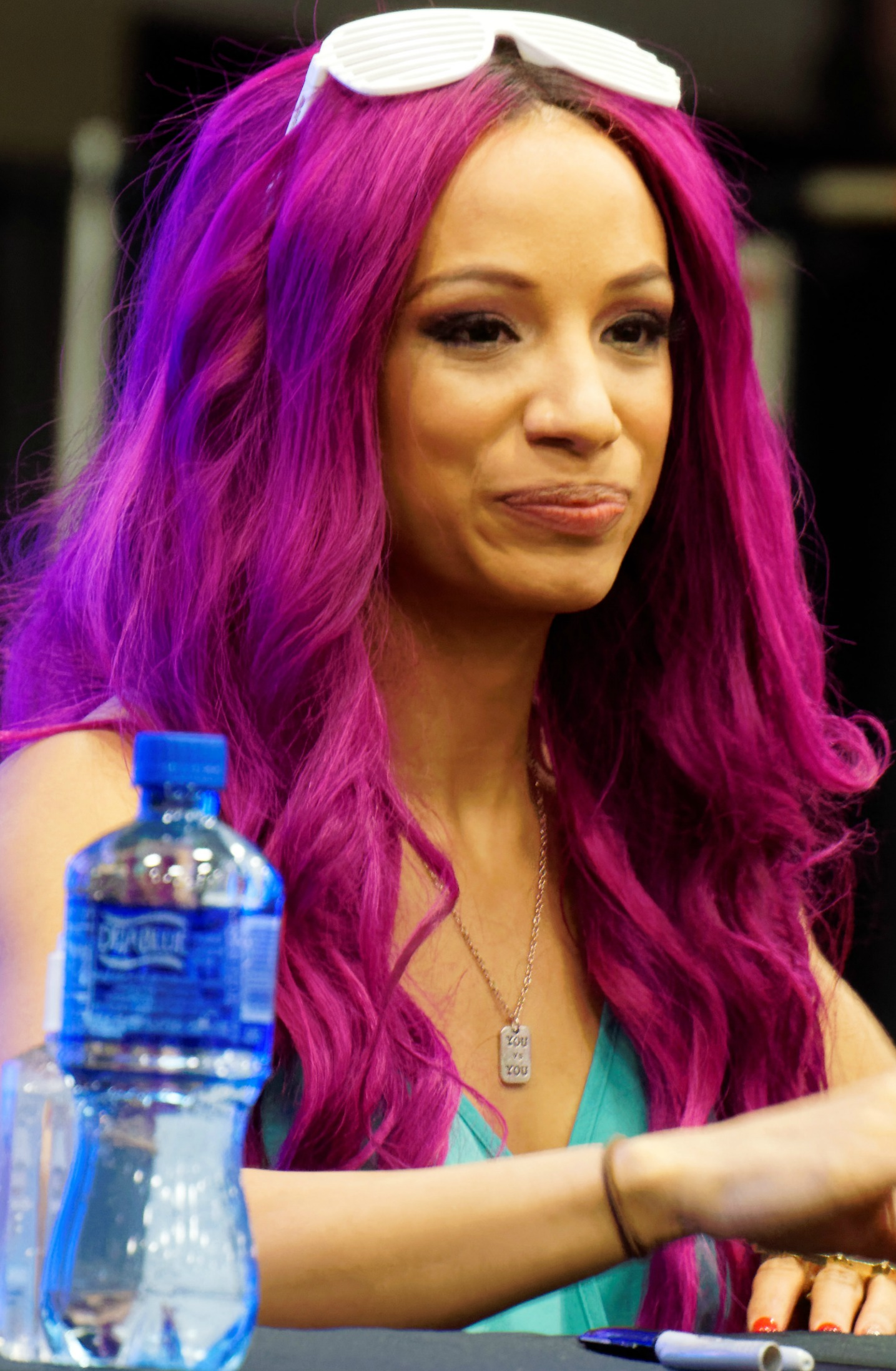
The next night on Raw, Sasha Banks defeated Charlotte to capture the WWE Women's Championship.

After Sasha Banks and Bayley defeated Charlotte and Dana Brooke at Battleground, Banks faced Charlotte for the WWE Women's Championship on the following night's episode of Raw and defeated Charlotte to win her first Women's Championship. A title rematch was later scheduled for SummerSlam. On the August 8 episode, Banks defeated Brooke, banning her from ringside during the match.

=== SmackDown ===
On the following episode of SmackDown, the entire SmackDown roster wanted a shot at Dean Ambrose's WWE World Championship. It was subsequently announced that there would be a six-pack challenge between AJ Styles, John Cena, Dolph Ziggler, Bray Wyatt, Baron Corbin, and a winner of a battle royal, which was won by Apollo Crews. Later that night, Ziggler won the six-pack challenge to earn a WWE World Championship match against Ambrose at SummerSlam.

On the August 2 episode of SmackDown, AJ Styles challenged John Cena to a match at SummerSlam, and Cena accepted.

== Results ==
No.	Results	Stipulations	Times
1^{P}	Breezango (Fandango and Tyler Breeze) defeated The Usos (Jey Uso and Jimmy Uso) by pinfall	Tag team match	5:26
2	Sasha Banks and Bayley^{M} defeated Charlotte and Dana Brooke by submission	Tag team match	7:25
3	The Wyatt Family (Bray Wyatt, Erick Rowan, and Braun Strowman) defeated The New Day (Big E, Kofi Kingston, and Xavier Woods) by pinfall	Six-man tag team match	8:47
4	Rusev (c) (with Lana) defeated Zack Ryder by submission	Singles match for the WWE United States Championship	7:01
5	Sami Zayn defeated Kevin Owens by pinfall	Singles match	18:22
6	Natalya defeated Becky Lynch by submission	Singles match	9:04
7	The Miz (c) (with Maryse) vs. Darren Young (with Bob Backlund) ended in a double disqualification	Singles match for the WWE Intercontinental Championship	8:41
8	Big Cass, Enzo Amore, and John Cena defeated The Club (AJ Styles, Luke Gallows, and Karl Anderson) by pinfall	Six-man tag team match	14:30
9	Dean Ambrose (c) defeated Roman Reigns and Seth Rollins by pinfall	Triple threat match for the WWE Championship	18:03
(c) / – the champion(s) heading into the match; P / – the match was broadcast on the pre-show

^{M}Bayley was revealed to be Sasha Banks' mystery tag team partner.
