= Jimmy Uso =

American professional wrestler (born 1985)

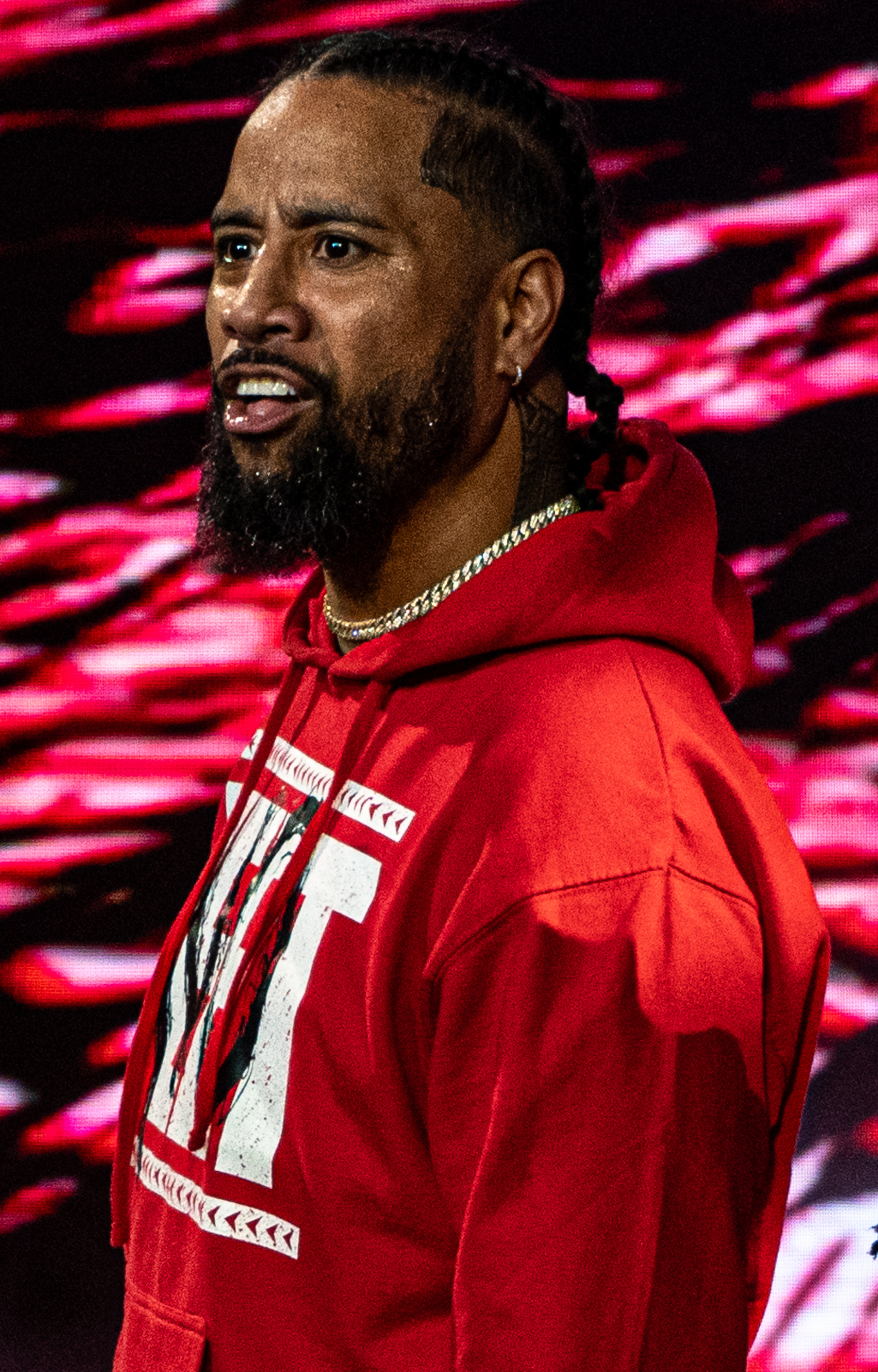
- Uso in 2024

Personal information
- Born: Jonathan Solofa Fatu; August 22, 1985 (age 41) San Francisco, California, U.S.
- Education: University of West Alabama
- Spouse: Trinity Fatu (m. 2014)
- Children: 3
- Father: Rikishi
- Family: Anoaʻi

Professional wrestling career
- Ring name(s): Jimmy Uso; Jon Fatu; Jonathan Fatu
- Billed height: 6 ft 3 in (191 cm)
- Billed weight: 251 lb (114 kg)
- Billed from: San Francisco, California
- Trained by: Rikishi; Booker T Wild Samoan Training Center; Florida Championship Wrestling
- Debut: June 8, 2007

Jonathan Solofa Fatu (born August 22, 1985), better known by his ring name Jimmy Uso, is an American professional wrestler. He is signed to WWE, where he performs on the Raw brand and is one-half of The Usos alongside his brother Jey as members of The Bloodline stable. He is a member of the Anoaʻi family of professional wrestlers.

Trained since childhood by his father, WWE Hall of Famer Rikishi, Fatu debuted in 2007, before joining WWE's then-developmental territory Florida Championship Wrestling (FCW) in 2010, and wrestled as Jimmy Uso alongside his twin brother, Jey as The Uso Brothers where they became FCW Florida Tag Team Champions. He and Jey were moved to the main roster later that year. While on the main roster, he and Jey have been managed by their cousin Tamina Snuka and Jimmy's wife, Naomi.

During his time as part of The Usos, alongside Jey, Fatu won the award of holding the record for the longest male tag team championship reign in WWE history at 622 days, which was accomplished in their fifth reign with the WWE SmackDown Tag Team Championship. They are overall nine-time tag team champions in WWE, capturing the World Tag Team Championship four times and winning the Slammy Award for Tag Team of the Year in both 2014 and 2015. In 2017, they won the SmackDown Tag Team Championship on three occasions, followed by a fourth reign in 2019 and a fifth reign in 2021. They are the first team to win both the Raw and SmackDown Tag Team Championships and the first team to hold them simultaneously as the Undisputed WWE Tag Team Championship. The two headlined multiple pay-per-views, including WrestleMania 39 - Night 1.

== Early life ==
Jonathan Solofa Fatu was born in San Francisco on August 22, 1985, nine minutes before his twin brother, Joshua Samuel, to parents Talisua Fuavai and professional wrestler Solofa Fatu Jr. He is of Samoan descent and is a member of the Anoaʻi family. He later attended Escambia High School and University of West Alabama alongside his twin brother.

== Professional wrestling career ==
=== Early career (2008–2009) ===
Jonathan made his professional wrestling debut as a tag team named The Samoan Soldiers with his brother on December 12, 2008, at NWA Prime Time in Columbus, Georgia. Jonathan debuted as John Fatu. In 2009, he and his brother wrestled twice as a tag team for Xtreme Championship Wrestling (XCW) in Texas.

=== World Wrestling Entertainment/WWE (2010–present) ===
==== Florida Championship Wrestling (2010) ====
The Uso Brothers debuted in Florida Championship wrestling in January 2010, along with his younger brother, Joshua by defeating The Rotundo Brothers (Duke and Bo) on January 14. In a clash of the generational wrestlers on February 18, The Rotundo Brothers teamed up with Wes Brisco to defeat The Usos and Donny Marlow. They continued their association with Marlow at the television tapings on February 25, when he accompanied them to ringside for a victory against Titus O'Neil and Big E Langston. In March, they were joined by Sarona Snuka, who began acting as their manager and on March 13, The Usos defeated The Fortunate Sons (Joe Hennig and Brett DiBiase) to win the FCW Florida Tag Team Championship. They made their first title defense at the March 18 television tapings by defeating The Dudebusters (Trent Baretta and Caylen Croft) to retain. They went on to successfully defend the championship against Percy Watson and Darren Young, Hunico and Tito Nieves, Skip Sheffield and Darren Young, and The Dudebusters, who they defeated by disqualification when Tamina pulled the referee out of the ring to stop him from counting the pinfall. On June 3, The Usos lost the Florida Tag Team Championship to "Los Aviadores" (Hunico and Dos Equis).

==== Early days of the Usos (2010–2016) ====
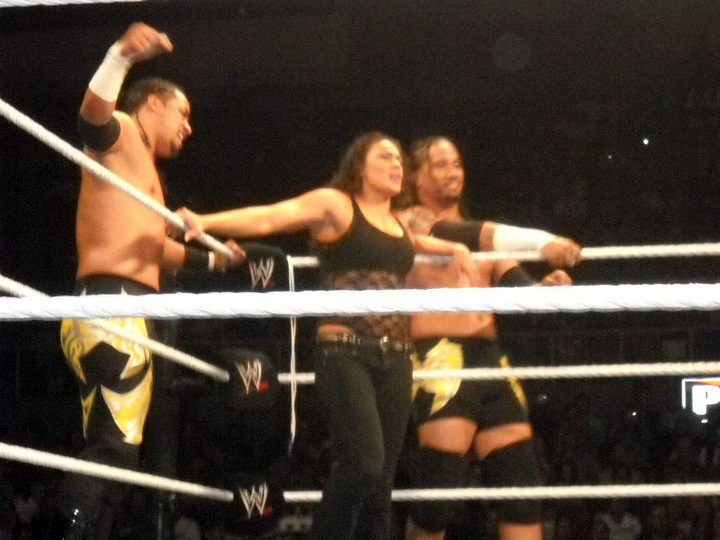
The Usos with Tamina in September 2010

On the May 24, 2010, episode of Raw, The Usos (with Jules now wrestling as Jey Uso) and Tamina made their debut as heels by attacking the Unified WWE Tag Team Champions, The Hart Dynasty (Tyson Kidd, David Hart Smith, and Natalya). After Tamina began managing Santino Marella and Vladimir Kozlov, the duo was drafted to SmackDown on April 26, 2011, as part of the 2011 Supplemental Draft. The Usos began performing the Siva Tau, a traditional Samoan war dance, as part of their ring entrance, using the dance to display their strength and energize themselves. They performed this entrance until they turned heel in 2016.

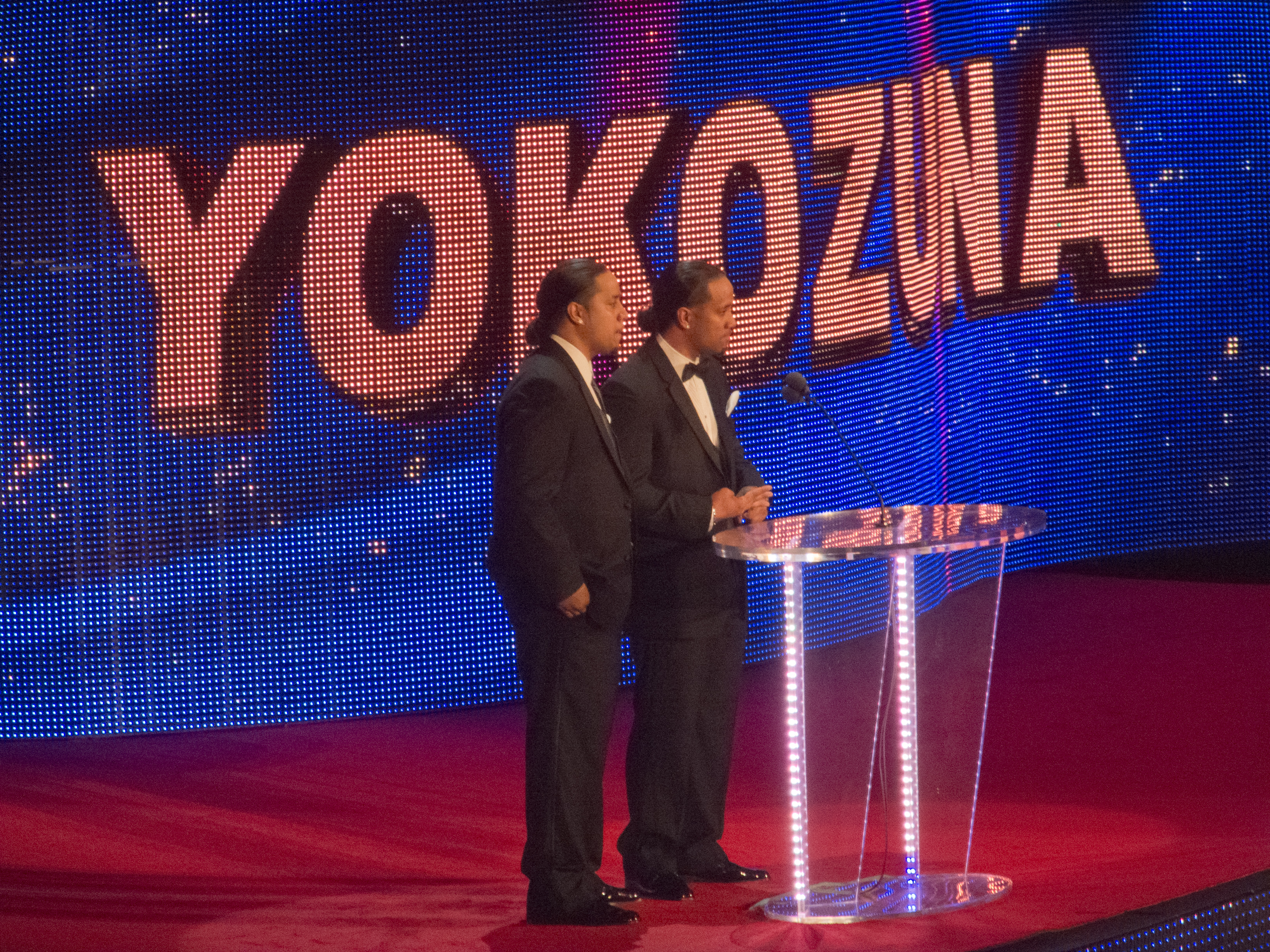
The Usos at the 2012 WWE Hall of Fame ceremony inducting their cousin Yokozuna

On the June 3 episode of Raw, The Usos began to use face paint similar to their deceased uncle Eddie Fatu, also known as Umaga, as a means of further highlighting their Samoan culture. During the following months, they competed for The Shield's WWE Tag Team Championship. At Money in the Bank The Usos challenged Rollins and Reigns for the titles, but were unsuccessful and participated in a triple-threat tag team match against the team of Cody Rhodes and Goldust and The Shield at the Hell in a Cell pay per view, which they failed to win.

The Usos were involved in the traditional Survivor Series elimination match at Survivor Series, teaming with Rey Mysterio, Cody Rhodes and Goldust in a losing effort against The Real Americans and The Shield. After a brief feud against The Wyatt Family, at the beginning of 2014, The Usos would go on a winning streak and began to demand a Tag Team Championship match from The New Age Outlaws. They received a tag title shot at the Elimination Chamber PPV against the Outlaws but were once again unsuccessful, but they won the titles on the March 3 episode of Raw. On the WrestleMania XXX pre-show, The Usos successfully defended their titles in a Fatal Four Way Elimination match against Ryback and Curtis Axel, The Real Americans, and Los Matadores. The Usos then resumed a rivalry with The Wyatt Family, successfully retaining the championships against Harper and Rowan at Money in the Bank and Battleground. The Usos then dropped the titles to Goldust and Stardust at Night of Champions, ending their reign at 202 days.

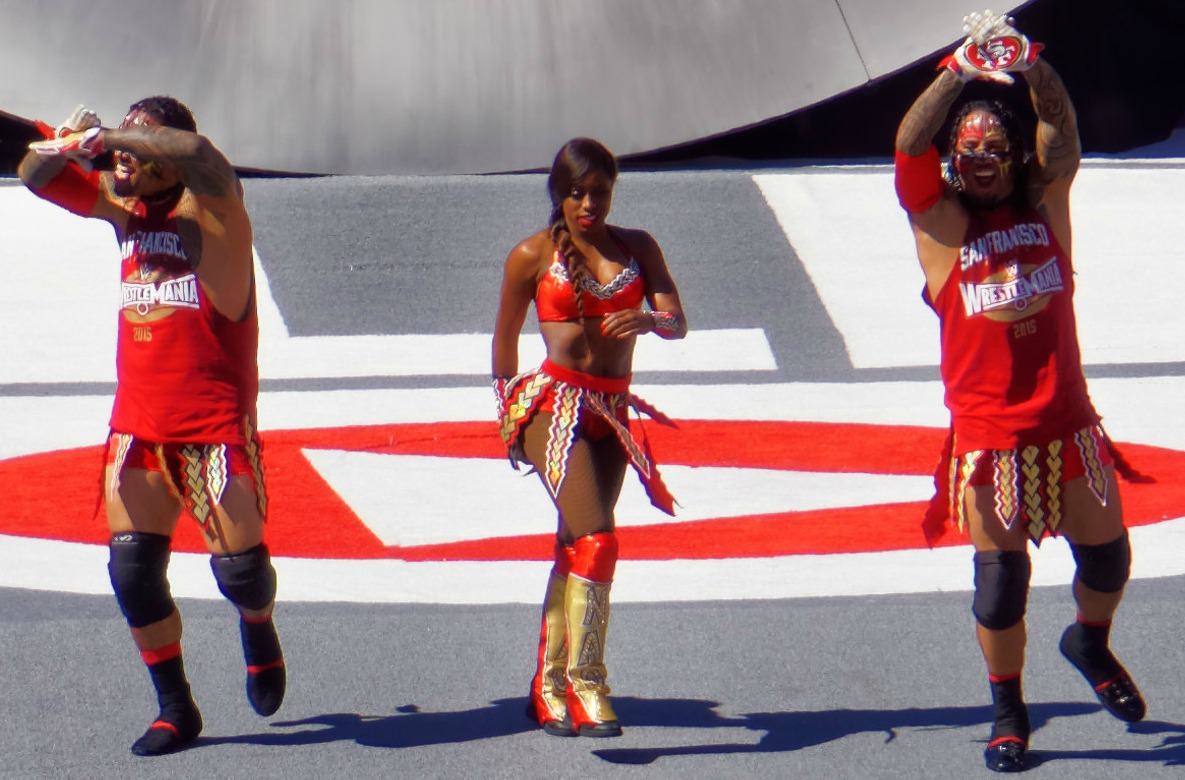
The Usos with Naomi making their entrance to the ring at the WrestleMania 31 pre-show in March 2015

On the December 29 edition of Raw, The Usos recaptured the titles from The Miz and Damien Mizdow after feuding with them over Naomi's entertainment opportunities. However, they lost the titles at Fastlane against Tyson Kidd and Cesaro. Despite getting a rematch the next night on Raw, The Usos did not regain the titles due to Natalya interfering for a DQ win. At the March 9 SmackDown tapings, Jey Uso suffered a legitimate shoulder injury. On the WrestleMania 31 pre-show, they competed in the fatal-four-way tag team match in which they lost and Jey further injuring his shoulder.

After Jey Uso suffered an anterior shoulder dislocation on the left arm, he remained off WWE television for about six months. On the April 18 episode of Main Event, Jimmy Uso defeated Xavier Woods. Jimmy performed commentary while Jey was out with the injury. On the May 12 episode of Main Event, Jimmy Uso teamed with Zack Ryder to face Luke Harper and Erick Rowan in a losing effort. Jimmy Uso returned to action on the September 10 episode of SmackDown, teaming with Roman Reigns and Dean Ambrose in a six-man tag team against The New Day (Big E, Kofi Kingston and Xavier Woods). They won via disqualification after Jimmy was attacked by The Wyatt Family (Bray Wyatt, Braun Strowman and Luke Harper).

Jey Uso returned on the November 2 episode of Raw alongside his brother Jimmy as a surprise return to team up with their cousin Roman Reigns, Dean Ambrose and Ryback against Seth Rollins, Kevin Owens and The New Day in a Survivor Series elimination tag team match, The Usos along with Reigns, Ambrose and Ryback were victorious in the match. On the November 30 episode of Raw, The Usos competed in a tag team #1 contenders match against Lucha Dragons, which ended in a double disqualification when The New Day attacked both teams. Later that night, Stephanie McMahon told The Usos that they would be inserted to the tag team championship match at the TLC pay-per-view if Roman Reigns defeated Sheamus during the main event of the show in 5 minutes and 15 seconds, which he won by disqualification. At TLC, The Usos competed in a losing effort. The Usos won a Slammy Award on the December 21 episode of Raw for "Tag Team of the year".

At the Royal Rumble, The Usos unsuccessfully challenged The New Day for the WWE Tag Team Championship. In February, The Usos entered a feud with the Dudley Boyz after they put The Usos through tables after defeating The New Day and Mark Henry in an 8-man Tag team Tables match. On the WrestleMania 32 kickoff show, The Usos defeated The Dudley Boyz, but the next night on Raw, they were defeated by the Dudleys in tables match. On the April 11 episode of Raw, The Usos defeated The Social Outcasts in the first round of a tag team tournament. Following the match, they were attacked by Luke Gallows and Karl Anderson. The following week on Raw, The Usos lost to The Vaudevillains in the semi-final round. On the May 2 episode of Raw, The Usos and Roman Reigns were defeated by AJ Styles, Gallows and Anderson in a six-man tag team match when Styles pinned Jey Uso. At Extreme Rules, The Usos were defeated by Gallows and Anderson in a Texas Tornado match. Later that night, they helped Roman Reigns retain his title in the main event.

==== Tag team dominance (2016–2020) ====
On July 19, at the 2016 WWE draft, The Usos were drafted to SmackDown working on both the Battleground and SummerSlam pre-shows. Then, they entered an 8 tag team tournament to determine the inaugural holders of the WWE SmackDown Tag Team Championship. On the September 6 episode of SmackDown, The Usos turned heel for the first time since 2011 when they attacked American Alpha after losing to them in 28 seconds in the semi-finals. At Backlash, The Usos defeated the Hype Bros before facing Heath Slater and Rhyno in the tournament finals, but were defeated. The Usos faced the new champions at No Mercy, where they were defeated again. As part of their heel turn, they began a street-like, thuggish gimmick. The Usos participated in a 5–on–5 Survivor Series Tag Team Elimination match at Survivor Series, where they lost to Cesaro and Sheamus of Team Raw. The Usos would reignite their feud with American Alpha following the Elimination Chamber after they attacked American Alpha.

On the March 21, 2017, episode of SmackDown, The Usos defeated American Alpha to win the SmackDown Tag Team Championship, becoming the first team to have won both the Raw (formerly WWE Tag Team Championship) and SmackDown Tag Team Championship. On the April 11 episode of SmackDown Live, The Usos were successful in their first title defense by defeating American Alpha in a rematch, ending the feud. They retained the titles at Backlash against Breezango (Tyler Breeze and Fandango) and Money in the Bank against The New Day, but lost them at Battleground to The New Day, ending their 124-day reign. On August 20 at the SummerSlam pre-show, The Usos defeated The New Day to recapture the titles. Their reign ended on the September 12 episode of SmackDown Live after they lost to The New Day in a Sin City Street Fight, but regained at Hell in a Cell. On the October 10 episode of SmackDown Live, The Usos claimed that they had respect for The New Day, turning into fan favorites again.

At Survivor Series, they defeated Raw Tag Team Champions Cesaro and Sheamus in an interbrand Champion vs Champion match. At Clash of Champions, The Usos retained the title in a fatal four-way tag team match against Chad Gable and Shelton Benjamin, The New Day (Big E and Kofi Kingston) and Rusev and Aiden English. At Royal Rumble, The Usos retained the titles against Gable and Benjamin in a two out of three falls match, winning 2–0. They would renew their rivalry with the New Day, culminating in a title match at Fastlane, which would end in a no-contest due to interference from The Bludgeon Brothers. At WrestleMania 34, The Usos wrestled on the main card of WrestleMania for the first time, where they defended the titles against The New Day and The Bludgeon Brothers in a triple threat tag team match, but The Usos dropped the belts to The Bludgeon Brothers after Harper pinned Kofi Kingston. This ended their reign at 182 days, setting a record for the longest SmackDown Tag Team Championship reign. On the SmackDown after WrestleMania, The Usos would defeat the New Day to earn a rematch against the Bludgeon Brothers for the WWE SmackDown Tag Team Championship at the Greatest Royal Rumble. At the event on April 27, The Usos were defeated when Rowan pinned Jey Uso.

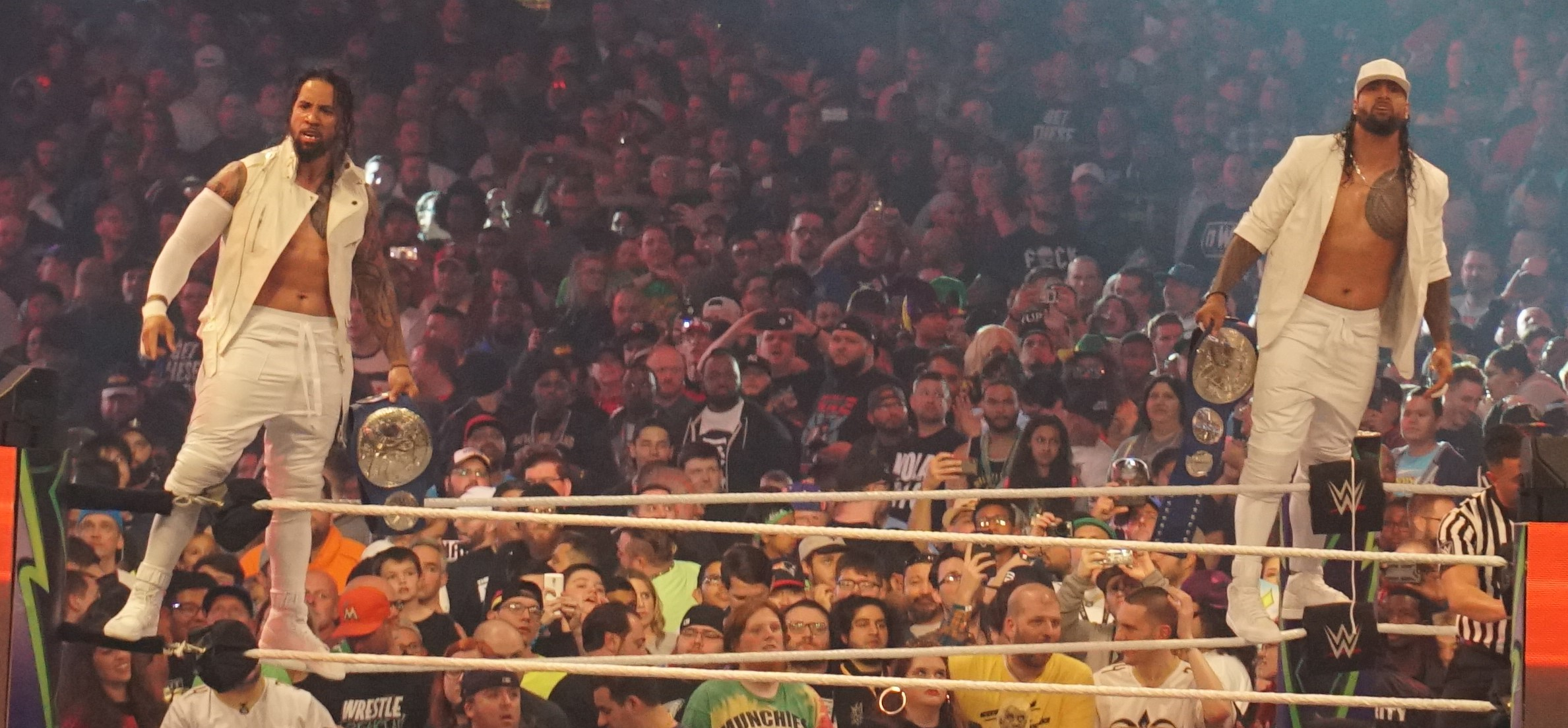
The Usos as SmackDown Tag Team Champions at WrestleMania 34

On the May 22 episode of SmackDown, The Usos attempted to earn another title match at Money in the Bank, but were defeated by Luke Gallows and Karl Anderson. Following the loss, The Usos began failing to earn numerous title opportunities, including a tag team match against a returning Team Hell No (Daniel Bryan and Kane) on the July 3 episode of SmackDown and losing in the first round of a number one contender's tournament to The Bar (Cesaro and Sheamus) on the July 31 episode of SmackDown. After months of treading in the division, The Usos began to build momentum, starting with Survivor Series, where they, as Team SmackDown's captains, emerged from the 10-on-10 Survivor Series match as the sole survivors, giving SmackDown their only win over Raw. They would go on to challenge The Bar for the SmackDown Tag Team Championship in a triple threat match, which also included the New Day at TLC, but failed to capture the titles.

On the January 29, 2019, episode of SmackDown, they defeated The Bar, The New Day and new SmackDown tag team Heavy Machinery (Otis and Tucker) to get a SmackDown Tag Team Championship match at Elimination Chamber, where they defeated Shane McMahon and The Miz, winning the titles for a record fourth time. On the March 26 episode of SmackDown, The Usos were a part of a tag team gauntlet match in which they forfeited to former longtime rivals the New Day as a show of respect and to help Kofi Kingston earn a WWE Championship match at WrestleMania. As a storyline punishment for their deed, they were scheduled to defend the titles against The Bar, Aleister Black and Ricochet, and Shinsuke Nakamura and Rusev in a Fatal 4-Way at WrestleMania 35, where they would retain. Two days later, on the April 9 episode of SmackDown, The Usos lost the titles to Hardy Boyz.

As part of the 2019 WWE Superstar Shake-up, The Usos were drafted to the Raw brand. They entered a feud with The Revival (Dash Wilder and Scott Dawson) on Raw, while also entering a feud with Daniel Bryan and Rowan on SmackDown, thanks to WWE's new Wild Card Rule. On the May 7 episode of SmackDown Live, they failed to regain the SmackDown Tag Team Championship from Bryan and Rowan. At Money in the Bank, they defeated Bryan and Rowan in a non-title match. They proceed their feud with The Revival, where the two team would be trading wins with one another. On the June 10 episode of Raw, both The Usos and The Revival competed in a triple threat match for the Raw Tag Team Championship against champions Curt Hawkins and Zack Ryder, which The Revival won. At Extreme Rules, The Usos challenged The Revival for the titles, where they were unsuccessful. Following Jimmy's arrest for DUI, the duo would be off television for the remainder of the calendar year.

==== The Bloodline (2020–2023) ====
On the January 3, 2020 episode of SmackDown, The Usos made a surprise return once again as part of the SmackDown brand, aiding Roman Reigns from an attack by King Corbin and Dolph Ziggler. The Usos then challenged for the SmackDown Tag Team Championship at Elimination Chamber and WrestleMania 36, where they were unsuccessful again. During the match at WrestleMania, Jimmy suffered a legitimate knee injury, putting him out of in-ring action indefinitely.

On the September 4 episode of SmackDown, after Big E was attacked and injured in a storyline, Jey took Big E's place in a fatal 4-way match against Matt Riddle, King Corbin, and Sheamus where the winner would earn a Universal Championship match at Clash of Champions against Roman Reigns, who turned heel recently. Jey won by pinning Riddle to earn the first singles championship opportunity of his career. He was defeated at Clash of Champions when Jimmy appeared and threw in a towel on Jey's behalf. Jey then received a rematch at Hell in a Cell in an "I Quit" Hell in a Cell match but lost again. After Hell in a Cell, Jey aligned with Roman Reigns, thus turning heel in the process. On the April 9, 2021, special WrestleMania edition of SmackDown, Jey won the Andre the Giant Memorial Battle Royal. This marked Jey's first major singles accolade in WWE.

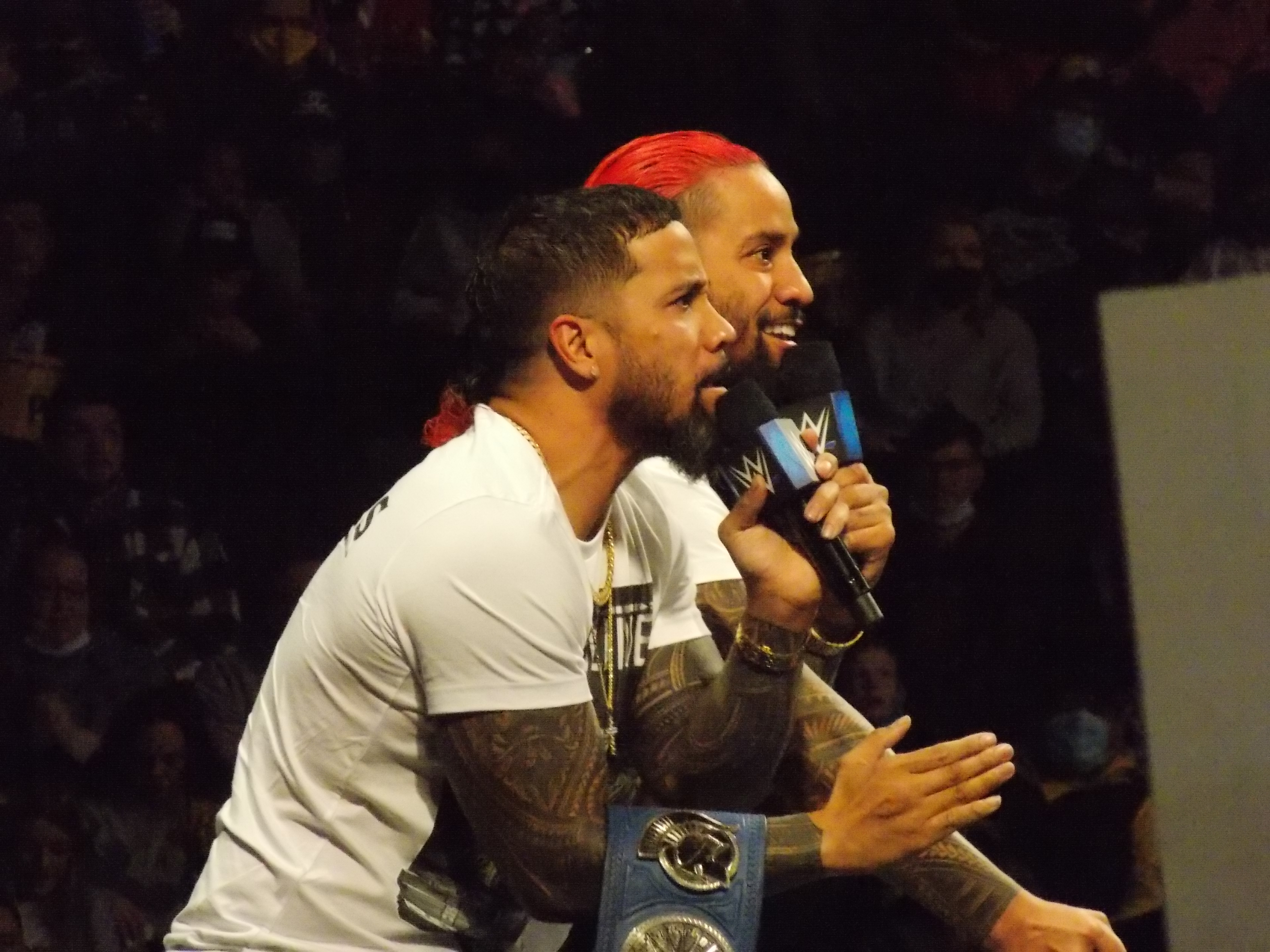
The Usos in 2022

After Jimmy returned from injury on the May 7 episode of SmackDown, there was an initial strife between The Usos and Reigns before they all reconciled and formed a faction, with Jimmy turning heel in the process. During the Money in the Bank Kickoff pre-show on July 18, The Usos were successful in capturing their fifth SmackDown Tag Team Championship from The Mysterios (composed of Rey and Dominik Mysterio). At SummerSlam, The Usos would defeat The Mysterios in a rematch to retain the titles.

On January 16, 2022, they broke their previous record of 182 days as longest reigning SmackDown Tag Team Champions. At WrestleMania 38, The Usos defeated Shinsuke Nakamura and Rick Boogs to retain their championship. At WrestleMania Backlash, The Usos and Reigns defeated RK-Bro (Randy Orton and Riddle) and Drew McIntyre in a six-man tag team match. On the May 20 episode of SmackDown, they, with outside interference from Reigns, defeated RK-Bro to win the Raw Tag Team Championship, becoming the Undisputed WWE Tag Team Champions. This gave The Usos their third reign as Raw Tag Team Champions (and first reign with the title since 2014) and made them the first team to hold the Raw and SmackDown titles simultaneously. At Money in the Bank, The Usos retained their undisputed titles against The Street Profits in controversial fashion, with The Usos winning by pinfall despite Montez Ford's shoulder being off the mat. A rematch between the teams was scheduled for SummerSlam with a special guest referee, later revealed to be Jeff Jarrett.

On July 18, The Usos surpassed the 365-day mark as SmackDown Tag Team Champions, becoming the first team to hold the titles for a continuous reign of one full year. At SummerSlam, The Usos successfully retained against The Street Profits. At Crown Jewel on November 5, The Usos successfully retained the titles against The Brawling Brutes (Butch and Ridge Holland). On the November 11 episode of SmackDown, they retained their championships against The New Day (Kofi Kingston and Xavier Woods), thus ensuring that they would become the longest reigning male tag team champions on WWE's main roster, a record previously set by The New Day at 483 days. On November 14, 2022, The Usos officially broke The New Day's record for main roster tag team championships, and then on November 28, they broke Gallus' record of 497 days with the NXT UK Tag Team Championship to become the longest reigning male tag team champions in WWE history, regardless of championship or roster status. At Survivor Series: WarGames on November 26, The Bloodline (The Usos, Roman Reigns, Solo Sikoa and Sami Zayn) defeated The Brawling Brutes, Drew McIntyre and Kevin Owens in a WarGames match.

Tensions between The Usos and Zayn resurfaced in subsequent weeks. After Reigns retained the Undisputed WWE Universal Championship at the Royal Rumble against Kevin Owens, The Usos proceeded to beat down Owens and handcuff him to the ring ropes. After refusing to hit Owens, Zayn then hit Reigns with a steel chair, turning face. Jimmy, Sikoa and Reigns attacked Zayn whilst Jey looked on and eventually left the ring in disgust. After the event, Jey declared on Instagram that "he's out" and did not appear on the following episode of SmackDown. Jey would show up on the February 10 episode of SmackDown to retain the SmackDown Tag Team Championship with Jimmy against Braun Strowman and Ricochet. Before the episode ended, Reigns, through Heyman, informed The Usos to stay at home for the following week's episode of SmackDown and Elimination Chamber in Canada. This was meant to write off The Usos as they may not be able to enter Canada due to their DUI history, where DUI charges are taken more seriously there. However, Jimmy would be present for the event to assist Reigns in retaining his championship, and Jey would show up to prevent Reigns from hitting Zayn with a chair, which failed.

On the March 6 episode of Raw, Jey showed up in the crowd during Jimmy's match against Zayn which Jimmy lost. Following the match, Jey hugged Zayn and then delivered a Superkick to the latter, affirming Jey's allegiance to The Bloodline. The Usos and Sikoa then attacked Zayn before Cody Rhodes ran out to save Zayn. On the March 20 episode of Raw, a reunited Owens and Zayn challenged The Usos for the Undisputed WWE Tag Team Championship at WrestleMania 39, which The Usos accepted. On Night 1 of the event on April 1, The Usos main evented WrestleMania for the first time in their careers, where they lost the titles to Owens and Zayn, thus ending their Raw reign at 316 days and their record SmackDown reign at 622 days. This match also marked the first time a tag team match main evented WrestleMania since its inaugural show. Following their loss, Reigns started ignoring them and depending on Sikoa instead, with Reigns inserting himself and Sikoa into a title match at Night of Champions. They failed to capture the Undisputed WWE Tag Team Championships in their rematch against Owens and Zayn on the April 28 episode of SmackDown.

==== Feud with Jey and exile from The Bloodline (2023–2024) ====
At Night of Champions, Jimmy turned face after he and Jey cost Reigns and Sikoa the match for the Undisputed WWE Tag Team Championships, with Jimmy superkicking Reigns for mistreating them. Jimmy was officially excommunicated from The Bloodline for his actions at Night of Champions on the June 2 episode of SmackDown during Reigns' 1,000 days Universal Champion celebration. On the June 9 episode of SmackDown, Jey was given a United States Championship opportunity against Austin Theory by Heyman to entice him to leave Jimmy, but lost the match after Jimmy while saving Jey from Pretty Deadly, mistakenly attacked Jey while aiming for Sikoa who tried to attack Jimmy. On the following week's episode of SmackDown, Jey decided to side with Jimmy and left The Bloodline by kicking Reigns, turning face in the process. The Usos then superkicked both Sikoa and Reigns. At Money in the Bank, The Usos defeated Reigns and Sikoa in a "Bloodline Civil War" tag team match with Jey pinning Reigns. This is Reigns' first direct pinfall loss since December 2019 at TLC: Tables, Ladders & Chairs.

At SummerSlam, Jimmy appeared to have turned on Jey by pulling him out of the ring while he was trying to pin Reigns and superkicked him, allowing Reigns to defeat Jey to retain his title and remain Tribal Chief, turning heel once again. However, on the August 11 episode of SmackDown, he explained that the reason for his actions was out of fear that if Jey had become the new Tribal Chief, the power would have corrupted him. Jey responded by superkicking Reigns, Sikoa, and finally Jimmy. Afterwards, he declared that he was quitting WWE. On the September 1 episode of SmackDown, Jimmy confronted John Cena with a new theme song, only to get an Attitude Adjustment from Cena. Later that night, he aided Solo Sikoa in his match against AJ Styles, teasing a possible reunion with The Bloodline, cementing his heel turn. At Fastlane on October 7, Jimmy and Sikoa lost to Cena and LA Knight in a tag team match. On the October 16 episode of Raw, Jimmy attacked Jey, helping The Judgment Day (Finn Bálor and Damian Priest) win the Undisputed WWE Tag Team Championship from Jey and Cody Rhodes. Jimmy competed in the 2024 Royal Rumble match coming in at number 2 while his brother Jey came in at number 1 lasting 34 minutes until being eliminated by Bron Breakker. On February 19, he again cost Jey another title match when he faced off against Gunther for the Intercontinental Championship. At WrestleMania XL, he was defeated by his brother Jey. On the following SmackDown after WrestleMania, Jimmy was once again removed from The Bloodline following an attack by the debuting Tama Tonga on orders from his younger brother Sikoa, turning face once again. This action allowed Jimmy to take time off due to an injury and was not assigned to a brand following the 2024 WWE Draft, making him a free agent.

==== Singles competition (2024–2025) ====
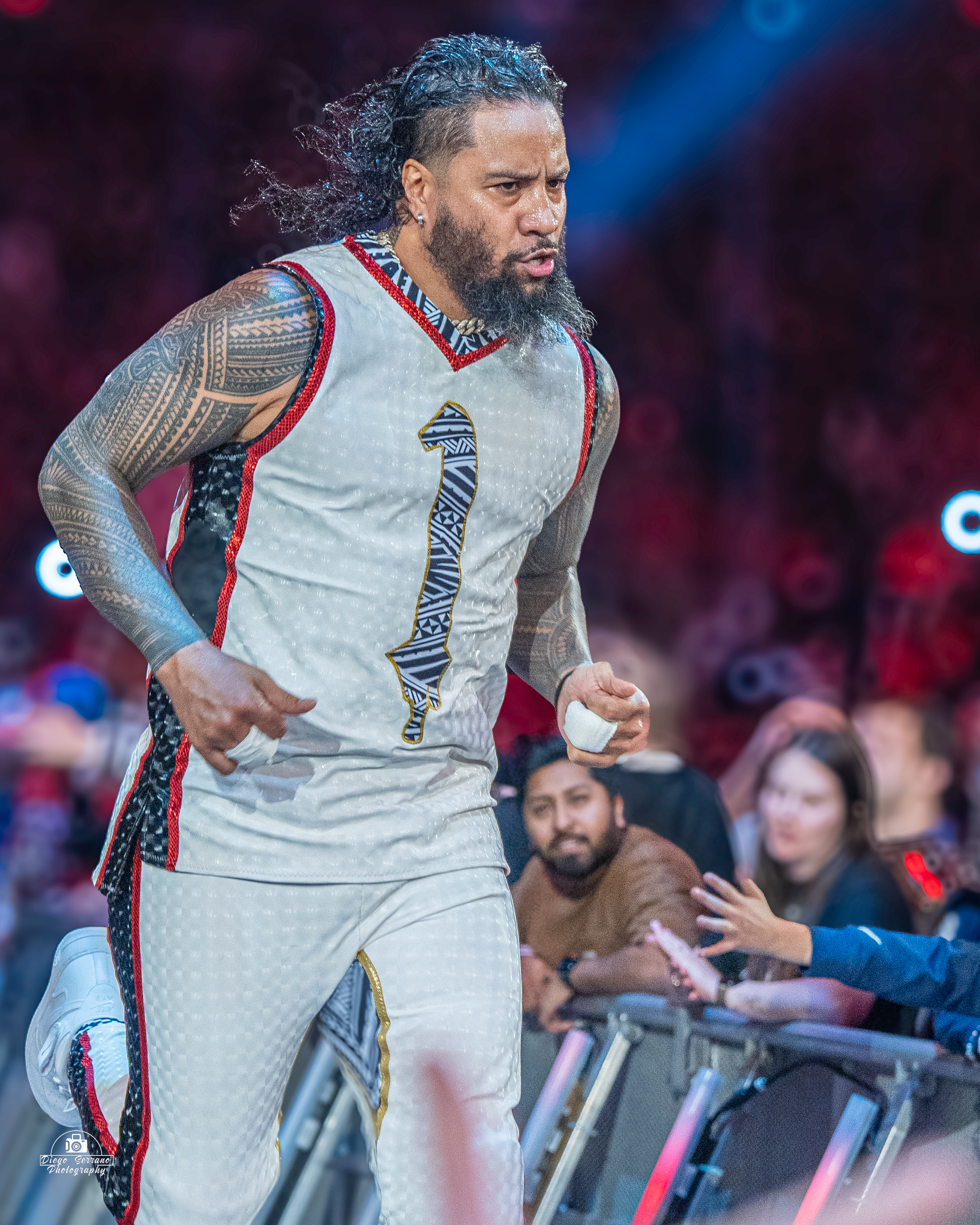
Uso at the Royal Rumble in February 2025

After a near-six month hiatus at Bad Blood, Jimmy cemented his face turn and made his return by assisting Roman Reigns and Cody Rhodes in defeating The New Bloodline's Solo Sikoa and Jacob Fatu and embraced Reigns after the match. On the October 14 episode of Raw, Jimmy attempted to make amends with Jey, but was pushed away. On the October 25 episode of SmackDown, Jey assisted Jimmy and Reigns in taking out The Bloodline, the brothers then embraced in the ring, reuniting The Usos. At Crown Jewel on November 2, The Usos and Reigns lost to Sikoa, Tonga and Fatu in a Six-Man Tag Team match with Sikoa pinning Reigns. At Survivor Series: WarGames on November 30, Jimmy, Jey, Reigns, Sami Zayn and CM Punk defeated The Bloodline and Bronson Reed in a WarGames match.On the January 17, 2025 episode of SmackDown, Jimmy began a feud Carmelo Hayes by challenging him to a match, the match ended via DQ. On the January 31, 2025 episode of SmackDown Jimmy Uso had a rematch against Carmelo Hayes and was successful. The next night in the 2025 Royal Rumble, Uso entered at number 10 before being eliminated by Jacob Fatu. At Wrestlepalooza on September 20, Jimmy and Jey lost to The Vision (Bron Breakker and Bronson Reed) in a tag team match with LA Knight as the special guest referee. At Survivor Series: WarGames on November 29, Jimmy along with Jey, Reigns, CM Punk and Cody Rhodes lost to Brock Lesnar, Drew McIntyre, Logan Paul and The Vision (Breakker and Reed) in a WarGames match after interference from a mysterious hooded figure which was later revealed to be Austin Theory.

==== Return to the tag team division (2025–present) ====
On the December 8 episode of Raw, Jimmy and Jey announced that they have reunited as The Usos and will be returning to tag team competition. On the December 29 episode of Raw, The Usos defeated AJ Styles and Dragon Lee to win the World Tag Team Championship, the ninth tag title reign for The Usos. On the March 30, 2026 episode of Raw, The Usos lost their titles to The Vision (Logan Paul and Austin Theory) in a Street Fight after interference from IShowSpeed, ending their reign at 91 days. At Wrestlemania 42 Night 1 on April 18, The Usos teamed up with LA Knight to defeat The Vision (Paul and Theory) and IShowSpeed in a Six-Man Tag-Team match ending their feud. After WrestleMania 42, The Usos reunited with Reigns along with Jacob Fatu to officially reform The Bloodline At Night 1 of SummerSlam on August 1, The Usos and Fatu lost to Knight, Sikoa and Royce Keys in a Six-Man Tag Team Match.

== Other media ==
He starred in the first episode of Outside the Ring, where he and his brother, Jey Uso cooked a traditional Samoan barbecue.

Jimmy made his video game debut in WWE '13 as a DLC. The Usos were not in WWE 2K14 but returned in WWE 2K15, and have continued to appear in each WWE 2K game since. He also appeared uncredited in Countdown with Dolph Ziggler, Roman Reigns, and Big Show and his brother Jey Uso as well as the animated film The Jetsons & WWE: Robo-WrestleMania!, in which he played a role as Usobots.

== Personal life ==
Fatu is the son of WWE Hall of Famer Solofa Fatu (Rikishi) and a member of the Anoaʻi family. He attended Escambia High School in Pensacola, Florida. where he played football. He continued his football career at the University of West Alabama with his brother Joshua, where they both played linebacker. Jonathan only played one season (2003).

Fatu married fellow wrestler and longtime girlfriend Trinity McCray (Naomi) on January 16, 2014. She is the stepmother of Jonathan's two children. On the August 18, 2025 episode of Raw, she announced that they were expecting their first child together.

== Legal issues ==
Fatu was arrested on September 29, 2011, in Hillsborough County, Florida and charged with DUI. A police officer observed Fatu at around 3 AM EDT driving the wrong way down a one way street. The officer pulled Fatu over and gave him a field sobriety test, which Fatu failed. Fatu was also given a breathalyzer and blew a .18, twice the legal limit in the state of Florida. Fatu was convicted and sentenced to probation. On March 13, 2013, Fatu was arrested for violating his probation by driving with a suspended license.

On February 14, 2019, Fatu was arrested in Detroit, Michigan following a dispute with police officers when he, Joshua, and Trinity Fatu's Dodge Journey rental vehicle were pulled over when driving the wrong way on a one-way street. Police claim that when they approached the vehicle, they could smell alcohol from the inside. Officers then requested Trinity, the driver, to exit the SUV so that they could speak with her. Officers then claimed that Jonathan Fatu, Trinity's spouse, exited the vehicle while officers were speaking to Trinity and removed his shirt, then proceeded to walk towards the officers, prompting one of the officers to pull out his taser. The situation was quickly calmed down, however, and Fatu was placed under arrest and charged with disorderly conduct and obstruction of justice. In March 2019, it was revealed that Fatu's attorney struck a plea deal with prosecutors, and as per the condition of the agreement, Fatu pleaded no contest to interfering with a government employee and he was ordered to pay a $450 fine.

In the early morning hours of July 25, 2019, Fatu was again arrested, this time near Pensacola, Florida, and was charged with DUI. He was taken into custody and booked into the Escambia County corrections center at approximately 3:00 A.M. CDT. Fatu was later released from custody on $1,000 bond and was due to appear in court on August 15. Fatu was found not guilty by an Escambia county jury on the DUI charge after a trial that concluded on December 18, 2019.

On July 5, 2021, Fatu was arrested after being pulled over at approximately 10:35 PM CDT in Pensacola. Officers claim Fatu ran a red light after they clocked him going 50 in a 35 MPH zone. They administered a breathalyzer and Fatu's BAC came back at .202 and .205, well above Florida's legal limit of .08. Fatu was booked on a misdemeanor DUI charge along with citations for speeding and running a red light. Bond was set at $500.

== Championships and accomplishments ==
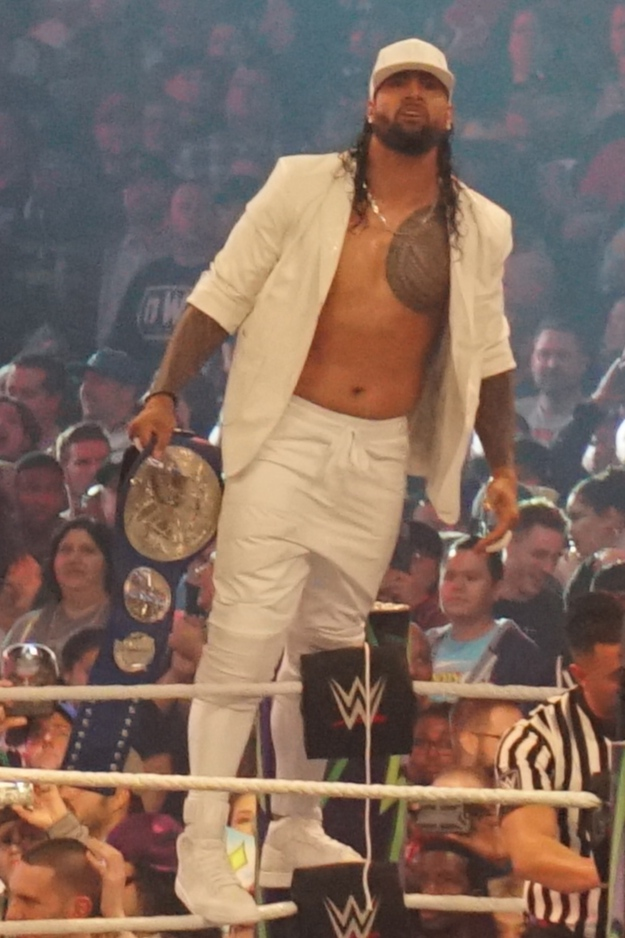
Jimmy Uso is a 4-time World Tag Team Champion and a 5-time WWE SmackDown Tag Team Champion.

- CBS Sports
  - Tag Team of the Year (2018) with Jey Uso
- ESPN
  - Best storyline of the year (2022) part of The Bloodline
  - Tag team of the year (2022) with Jey Uso
- Florida Championship Wrestling
  - FCW Florida Tag Team Championship (1 time) – with Jey Uso
- New York Post
  - Storyline of the Year (2022) – part of The Bloodline
- Pro Wrestling Illustrated
  - Faction of the Year (2022) – with The Bloodline
  - Tag Team of the Year (2014) – with Jey Uso
  - Ranked No. 25 of the top 500 singles wrestlers in the PWI 500 in 2014
  - Ranked No. 1 of the top 50 Tag Teams in the PWI Tag Team 50 in 2022 – with Jey Uso
- Rolling Stone
  - Tag Team of the Year (2017) with Jey Uso
- Wrestling Observer Newsletter
  - Feud of the Year (2023) as part of The Bloodline vs. Kevin Owens and Sami Zayn
  - Worst Match of the Year (2024) vs. Jey Uso at WrestleMania XL
- WWE
  - World Tag Team Championship (Note: The title was named the WWE Tag Team Championship during his first and second reigns & WWE Raw Tag Team Championship during his third reign.) (4 times) – with Jey Uso
  - WWE SmackDown Tag Team Championship (5 times) – with Jey Uso
  - Slammy Award (3 times)
    - Tag Team of the Year (2014, 2015) – with Jey Uso
