= SummerSlam (2016) =

WWE pay-per-view and livestreaming event

- Promotional poster featuring various WWE wrestlers
- Promotion: WWE
- Brand(s): Raw; SmackDown
- Date: August 21, 2016
- City: Brooklyn, New York
- Venue: Barclays Center
- Attendance: 15,974

WWE event chronology
| ← Previous; NXT TakeOver: Brooklyn II | Next → Backlash |

SummerSlam chronology
| ← Previous; 2015 | Next → 2017 |

The 2016 SummerSlam was a professional wrestling pay-per-view (PPV) and livestreaming event produced by WWE, held for wrestlers from the promotion's main roster brands, Raw and SmackDown. It was the 29th annual SummerSlam and took place on August 21, 2016, at the Barclays Center in the New York City borough of Brooklyn, New York. This was the second of four consecutive SummerSlam events to take place at the arena. It was also WWE's first PPV and livestreaming event held after the brand extension, which was reintroduced in July, went into full effect.

Twelve matches were contested at the event, including three on the Kickoff pre-show. In the main event, which was an interbrand match, Raw's Brock Lesnar defeated SmackDown's Randy Orton by technical knockout. In another marquee match, "The Demon King" Finn Bálor defeated Seth Rollins to become the inaugural WWE Universal Champion, which was introduced to be Raw's world championship. In other prominent matches, Dean Ambrose defeated Dolph Ziggler to retain SmackDown's WWE World Championship, and AJ Styles defeated John Cena in a singles match from SmackDown.

== Production ==
=== Background ===
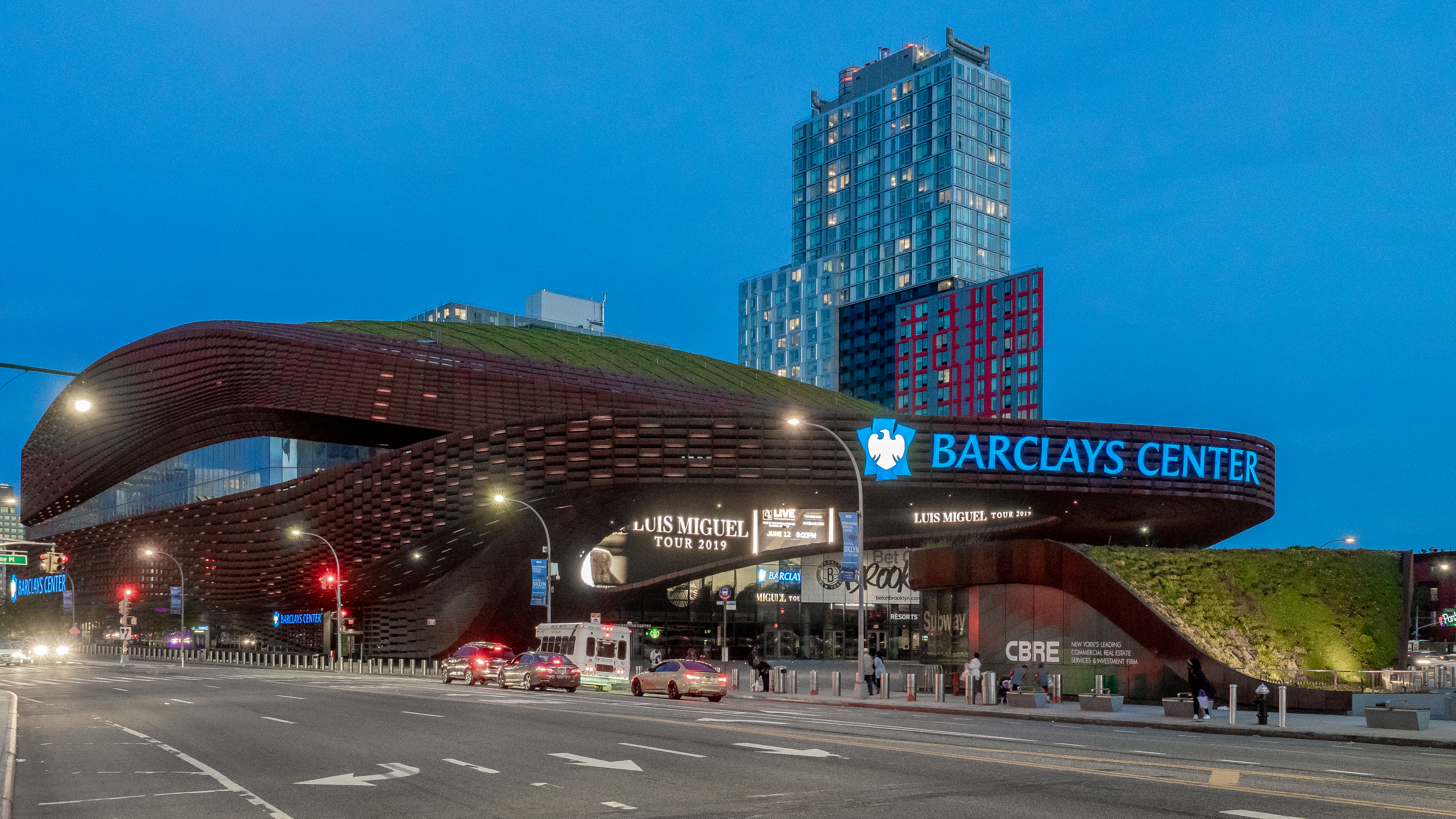
The 29th annual SummerSlam was the second of four consecutive SummerSlams to be held at the Barclays Center in Brooklyn, New York.

SummerSlam is an annual professional wrestling event produced every August by WWE since 1988. It was originally broadcast exclusively via pay-per-view (PPV) before it began simultaneously livestreaming on the WWE Network in 2014. Dubbed "The Biggest Party of the Summer", it is one of the promotion's original four PPVs, along with WrestleMania, Royal Rumble, and Survivor Series, referred to as the "Big Four". It has since become considered WWE's second biggest event of the year behind WrestleMania.

Announced on September 28, 2015, the 29th SummerSlam was scheduled to be held on August 21, 2016, at the Barclays Center in the New York City borough of Brooklyn, New York for the second consecutive year. Tickets went on sale on April 2 through Ticketmaster. It featured wrestlers from the Raw and SmackDown brand divisions, being the first PPV and livestreaming event to occur after the brand split went into full effect following its reintroduction the previous month.

Ahead of the event, WWE and KFC, which was that year's event sponsor, held a promotional tie-in for its "Chicken Little" chicken sandwich. It featured a match between The Miz, dressed as "Puppers Cluckers" in a yellow chicken suit, and Dolph Ziggler, as KFC's founder Colonel Sanders, which took place after the conclusion of the August 16 episode of SmackDown Live where Ziggler emerged victorious.

=== Storylines ===
The event comprised 12 matches, including three on the Kickoff pre-show, that resulted from scripted storylines. Results were predetermined by WWE's writers on the Raw and SmackDown brands, while storylines were produced on WWE's weekly television shows, Monday Night Raw and SmackDown Live.

On June 5, WWE granted Brock Lesnar a "one-off opportunity" to return to mixed martial arts competition at UFC 200 on July 9, while also confirming that Lesnar would compete at SummerSlam. On the July 7 episode of SmackDown, Lesnar's SummerSlam opponent was announced as Randy Orton, who was returning from injury. WWE billed the match as "15 years in the making". On July 15, WWE confirmed that the match would still be taking place, despite a USADA notification in regards to Lesnar's Ultimate Fighting Championship (UFC) bout, stemming from an out-of-competition sample collected on June 28, which tested positive for a banned substance. A second sample taken in-competition on July 9 was also tested positive for the same banned substance, believed to be hydroxy-clomifene, discovered in the previous sample. On July 26, WWE confirmed that Lesnar would not be facing any disciplinary action from WWE as he was exempt from the WWE Wellness Policy due to his status as a part-time performer. Orton returned at Battleground as the guest on Chris Jericho's "Highlight Reel". Orton said that he only needed one RKO to take down Lesnar and also took a shot at Lesnar's failed drug tests. On the August 1 episode of Raw, Lesnar's manager Paul Heyman proclaimed that Orton would never be able to execute his finisher on Lesnar when Orton suddenly appeared and attacked Lesnar with an RKO. Lesnar subsequently attacked Orton with an F-5 during his match against Fandango on SmackDown the next night. The last Raw before SummerSlam saw Lesnar and Heyman cutting another promo on Orton until Heath Slater interrupted, aiming to earn a WWE contract (as he was undrafted in the WWE draft) by defeating Lesnar. Lesnar attacked Slater with an F-5 to send a message to Orton. Slater faced Orton the next night on SmackDown to earn a contract. Orton intentionally got himself disqualified, mocking Lesnar before attacking Slater with an RKO.

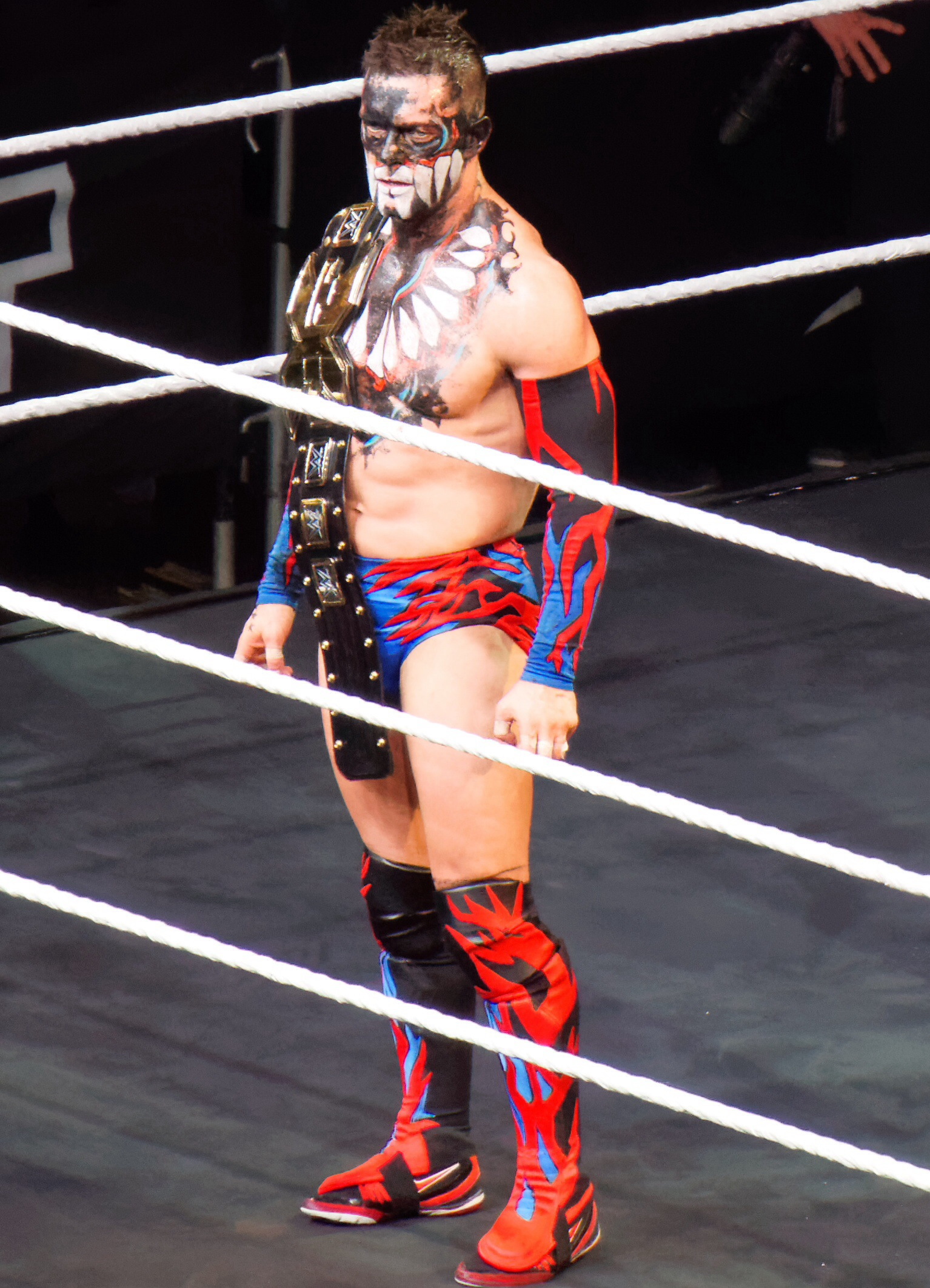
Finn Bálor wrestled Seth Rollins at the event for the inaugural WWE Universal Championship.

After SmackDown draftee Dean Ambrose retained the WWE World Championship at Battleground against Raw draftees Roman Reigns and Seth Rollins in a triple threat match, Raw was left without a world title. Subsequently, Stephanie McMahon and Mick Foley announced a new championship, the WWE Universal Championship, the following night on Raw to serve as the brand's top championship. It was then announced that the inaugural champion would be crowned at SummerSlam in a singles match; Rollins, as Raw's #1 draft pick, was automatically set for that match, while his opponent was determined by two fatal four-way matches that night, with the winners wrestling each other in a singles match. Finn Bálor won the first qualifier by defeating Cesaro, Kevin Owens, and Rusev, while Reigns won the second by defeating Chris Jericho, Sami Zayn, and Sheamus. Bálor then defeated Reigns and was added to the title match at SummerSlam. Bálor and Rollins confronted each other the following week, both promising to win at SummerSlam. Rollins then attempted to attack Bálor, but Bálor countered, forcing Rollins to retreat. Two weeks later, Bálor's alter ego, "The Demon King", confronted Rollins after Rollins called him out.

On the July 26 episode of SmackDown, a six-pack challenge involving John Cena, Bray Wyatt, AJ Styles, Dolph Ziggler, Baron Corbin, and Apollo Crews was held to determine the #1 contender for the WWE World Championship at SummerSlam. Ziggler won the match by pinning Styles. The next week, after Dean Ambrose doubted Ziggler's ability, Wyatt attacked Ziggler and challenged him for his title shot. Ziggler accepted and defeated Wyatt. The next week, after Ambrose and Ziggler teamed up to defeat Wyatt and Erick Rowan, Ambrose performed Dirty Deeds on Ziggler. Ziggler responded by attacking Ambrose with a superkick on their "Miz TV" segment during the final episode of SmackDown before SummerSlam.

At Battleground, Sasha Banks recruited Bayley from NXT as a mystery partner to defeat WWE Women's Champion Charlotte and Dana Brooke in a tag team match when Banks made Charlotte submit. This earned Banks a title match against Charlotte the following night on Raw, in which she again made Charlotte submit to win the title. Charlotte invoked her rematch clause five days later to face Banks for the title at SummerSlam. The following week, a confrontation between the two was interrupted by Chris Jericho and Enzo Amore, resulting in a mixed tag team match, which Charlotte and Jericho won. On the August 8 episode of Raw, Banks defeated Brooke, resulting in the latter being banned from ringside at SummerSlam.

After the aforementioned mixed tag team match, Chris Jericho attacked Enzo Amore until Big Cass came out to help his partner. Later in the event, Owens told Jericho that he had his back during a backstage interview with Tom Phillips. The following week, Jericho defeated Amore by disqualification when Cass interfered. After the match, Cass challenged Owens and Jericho to a tag team match at SummerSlam, which Owens and Jericho accepted.

After AJ Styles's victory over John Cena at Money in the Bank, The Club (Styles, Karl Anderson, and Luke Gallows) began attacking Cena until Enzo Amore and Big Cass came to Cena's aide, setting up a six-man tag team match for Battleground. At the event, Cena, Amore, and Cass defeated The club. During the draft Amore, Cass, Anderson, and Gallows were drafted to Raw, while Cena and Styles were drafted to SmackDown splitting up the two teams. On the August 2 episode of SmackDown, Styles challenged Cena to another match at SummerSlam, which Cena accepted.

On the August 2 episode of SmackDown, Apollo Crews defeated Baron Corbin and Kalisto in a triple threat match to earn an Intercontinental Championship match against The Miz at SummerSlam.

On the July 25 episode of Raw, The New Day (Kofi Kingston, Big E, and Xavier Woods) were celebrating in the ring on becoming the longest-reigning WWE Tag Team Champions. While celebrating with a fan, Luke Gallows and Karl Anderson attacked all three members of New Day. The following week on Raw, Big E and Kingston defeated Gallows and Anderson. Gallows and Anderson then attacked all three members of New Day, finishing with Gallows and Anderson pulling Big E groin-first into the ring post, causing a contusion in Big E's groin. On August 8, Woods and Kingston were scheduled to defend the WWE Tag Team Championship against Gallows and Anderson at SummerSlam.

After losing to Cesaro on the August 1 episode of Raw, Sheamus attacked Cesaro. On the August 8 episode of Raw, Cesaro defeated Sheamus again, but lost a match for the United States Championship against Rusev after interference from Sheamus. On the August 15 episode of Raw, Cesaro distracted Sheamus, costing him a match against Sami Zayn. During an ensuing argument, Raw General Manager Mick Foley scheduled a Best-of-Seven Series between the two, with the first match taking place at SummerSlam. On August 19, the match was moved to the SummerSlam Kickoff pre-show.

Eva Marie was drafted to SmackDown, but for several episodes of SmackDown, circumstances, including a pulled hamstring and a wardrobe malfunction, prevented her from making her in-ring debut. On the August 16 episode, Eva Marie no-showed for her match against Naomi. Later that night, Becky Lynch and Carmella took on Natalya and Alexa Bliss; during the match, Marie appeared on the entrance ramp. Naomi then appeared and started to chase Marie, passing the ring at one point. During the confusion, Lynch applied her "Dis-Arm-Her" on Natalya, who submitted. Later on, a six-woman tag team match was scheduled for SummerSlam. On August 18, Marie was suspended for 30 days due to a violation of WWE's wellness policy, taking her out of the match. In light of this, WWE's advertising was intentionally vague about whether the match would be turned into a three-on-two handicap or if Natalya and Bliss would have a third partner.

On the August 16 episode of SmackDown, American Alpha (Chad Gable and Jason Jordan), The Hype Bros (Zack Ryder and Mojo Rawley), and The Usos (Jey Uso and Jimmy Uso) defeated Breezango (Tyler Breeze and Fandango), The Ascension (Konnor and Viktor), and The Vaudevillains (Aiden English and Simon Gotch). On August 19, a rematch was scheduled for the SummerSlam Kickoff pre-show. On the same show, Jon Stewart, who had been SummerSlam's guest host the previous year, was announced to be returning to the event as a special guest.

==== Cancelled match ====
On the August 1 episode of Raw, after United States Champion Rusev defeated Mark Henry to retain the title, Roman Reigns confronted Rusev. The following week, Reigns interrupted Rusev and Lana's wedding celebration and issued a challenge to Rusev for the title. Rusev declined and the two brawled, causing Lana to fall into a wedding cake. Backstage, Mick Foley told an angered Lana and Rusev that Rusev would be defending his United States title against Reigns at SummerSlam. Later that night, Rusev successfully defended his title in an impromptu match against Cesaro. After the match, Rusev was attacked by Reigns with a Spear. Reigns defeated Rusev in a non-title match the following week.

== Event ==
Other on-screen personnel
| Role: | Name: |
|---|---|
| English commentators | Michael Cole (Raw) |
| English commentators | Corey Graves (Raw/Main Event) |
| English commentators | Byron Saxton (Raw/Main Event) |
| English commentators | Mauro Ranallo (SmackDown/Main Event) |
| English commentators | John "Bradshaw" Layfield (SmackDown/Main Event) |
| English commentators | David Otunga (SmackDown) |
| Spanish commentators | Carlos Cabrera |
| Spanish commentators | Marcelo Rodríguez |
| Spanish commentators | Jerry Soto |
| Ring announcers | Greg Hamilton (SmackDown) |
| Ring announcers | JoJo (Raw) |
| Referees | Jason Ayers |
| Referees | Shawn Bennett |
| Referees | Mike Chioda |
| Referees | John Cone |
| Referees | Dan Engler |
| Referees | Darrick Moore |
| Referees | Chad Patton |
| Referees | Charles Robinson |
| Referees | Ryan Tran |
| Referees | Rod Zapata |
| Backstage interviewers | Tom Phillips |
| Backstage interviewers | Andrea D'Marco |
| Backstage interviewers | Maria Menounos |
| Pre-show panel | Renee Young |
| Pre-show panel | Booker T |
| Pre-show panel | Jerry Lawler |
| Pre-show panel | Lita |

=== Pre-show ===
Three matches were contested on the SummerSlam Kickoff pre-show. In the first match, American Alpha (Jason Jordan and Chad Gable), The Hype Bros (Zack Ryder and Mojo Rawley), and The Usos (Jey Uso and Jimmy Uso) faced Breezango (Tyler Breeze and Fandango), The Ascension (Konnor and Viktor), and The Vaudevillains (Aiden English and Simon Gotch) in a twelve-man tag team match. Jey Uso won the match for his team by pinning Simon Gotch after a Samoan Splash.

After that, Sami Zayn and Neville squared off against The Dudley Boyz (Bubba Ray Dudley and D-Von Dudley) in a tag team match. In the end, Zayn performed a Helluva Kick on Bubba Ray followed by Neville executing the "Red Arrow" for the pinfall.

Finally, Sheamus wrestled Cesaro in the first match of the best-of-seven series. Sheamus won the match with a "Brogue Kick" on Cesaro for the pinfall.

=== Preliminary matches ===
The actual pay-per-view opened with Enzo Amore and Big Cass facing Chris Jericho and Kevin Owens. In the climax, Amore executed a diving DDT on Jericho only for Owens to break up the pinfall. Owens and Jericho then performed a Pop-Up "Codebreaker" on Amore, with Jericho pinning Amore for the win.

In the second match, Sasha Banks defended the WWE Women's Championship against Charlotte with Dana Brooke banned from ringside. Early in the match, both combatants tried to apply their respective holds on each other but their efforts were not successful. However, Charlotte caught Banks on the top turnbuckle and dropped her, causing Banks to land awkwardly, injuring her back in the process. At one point during the match, Banks managed to counter a Razor's Edge powerbomb into a hurricanrana. Banks performed her Double Knees move on Charlotte's back for a nearfall. Banks blocked a Superplex attempt and followed up with a Meteora outside the ring. Back inside, Banks attempted a Backstabber, but failed because of her injured back. Charlotte attempted a "Natural Selection", only for Banks to counter into the "Bank Statement". Charlotte managed to escape and eventually executed the "Natural Selection" on Banks for a near-fall. In the end, Banks applied the "Bank Statement", however, Charlotte shifted her weight to score a pinfall victory and regain the championship.

Next, The Miz defended the Intercontinental Championship against Apollo Crews. The match ended when The Miz avoided a "Stinger Splash" by Crews, allowing Miz to execute the "Skull Crushing Finale" to retain the title.

In the fourth match, AJ Styles faced John Cena. Early in the match, Styles countered an "Attitude Adjustment" into a Pele Kick and executed a "Styles Clash" for a near-fall, followed by Cena executing an "Attitude Adjustment" on Styles for a near-fall. Styles attempted a Springboard on Cena, which Cena countered into the STF. A trade of reversals from Styles's Calf Crusher and Cena's STF followed. Styles executed a "Phenomenal Forearm" on Cena for a two count. Cena performed a "Super Attitude Adjustment" on Styles for a nearfall. A shocked Cena tried another "Attitude Adjustment", but Styles countered it into a "Styles Clash". After a second "Phenomenal Forearm", Styles pinned Cena to win the match. After the match, Cena removed his armband and put it in the center of the ring before departing backstage to a standing ovation from the crowd.

After that, Jon Stewart, acting as a replacement for the injured Big E, introduced the WWE Tag Team Champions, The New Day (Kofi Kingston and Xavier Woods) for their title defense against Luke Gallows and Karl Anderson. Gallows and Anderson executed the "Magic Killer" on Kingston, but Stewart entered the ring and distracted them. Gallows and Anderson then tried to injure Stewart's groin using the ring post when Big E ran in, making his return, and attacked Gallows and Anderson, thus causing a disqualification. Gallows and Anderson won the match, but The New Day retained the tag team championships.

In the sixth match, Dean Ambrose defended the WWE World Championship against Dolph Ziggler. In the end, Ambrose executed "Dirty Deeds" on Ziggler to retain the title.

After that, Becky Lynch, Naomi, and Carmella were scheduled to face Natalya, Alexa Bliss, and Eva Marie in a six-woman tag team match. After Eva Marie was declared absent, Nikki Bella was introduced as her replacement. The match ended when Nikki performed a Forearm Smash on Carmella, who had been distracted by Natalya and Bliss, and executed a Fireman's Carry Cutter to win the match for her team.

Stephanie McMahon and Mick Foley then unveiled the new WWE Universal Championship belt in the ring. The inaugural champion was then determined in a match between "The Demon King" Finn Bálor and Seth Rollins, in a match that could only end in pinfall or submission. Early in the match, Rollins powerbombed Bálor into the barricade, causing Bálor to legitimately dislocate his shoulder. Later, Bálor attempted a Coup de Grâce, but Rollins moved out of the way and performed a Pedigree for a nearfall. Bálor then avoided a Phoenix Splash attempt and dropkicked Rollins into the corner turnbuckles. Bálor attempted a Coup de Grâce, but Rollins countered into a Superplex and attempted a Pedigree, only for Bálor to counter into a double stomp. Afterwards, Bálor dropkicked Rollins into the turnbuckles twice and followed up with the Coup de Grâce on Rollins to become the inaugural WWE Universal Champion.

Next, Rusev was scheduled to defend the United States Championship against Roman Reigns. However, before the match officially started, Rusev attacked Reigns, resulting in a brawl. While the referees tried to separate the two, Reigns hit Rusev with a chair. Finally, Rusev was declared unable to compete. After the announcement was made, Reigns attacked Rusev with a spear.

=== Main event ===
In the main event, Brock Lesnar fought Randy Orton. During the match, Lesnar threw Orton off the barricade through a broadcast table. Orton executed an RKO on the top of another broadcast table. Orton carried Lesnar back to the ring and performed an off-the-rope DDT. Orton then executed a second RKO for a near-fall. As Orton attempted a punt kick, Lesnar countered with an F-5 for a near-fall. Lesnar removed his gloves and attacked Orton bare-knuckled, legitimately hitting him with numerous elbow strikes which caused Orton to bleed profusely. This led to Lesnar winning via technical knockout and Randy Orton tended to by WWE medical personnel. Afterwards, Shane McMahon came to the ring to check on Orton and was immediately given an F-5 by Lesnar when confronted.

== Aftermath ==
Following the event, Randy Orton received ten staples to close a laceration on his forehead. Reportedly, there was also a backstage confrontation between Brock Lesnar and Chris Jericho. According to Dave Meltzer of Wrestling Observer Newsletter, Jericho questioned WWE producer Michael Hayes about whether the finish was planned or not. After getting no response from Hayes, Jericho became angrier. Lesnar confronted Jericho and the two exchanged words and tangled up against a wall before Triple H and Vince McMahon broke up the situation, with McMahon stating that the ending was planned.

=== Raw ===
The following night on Raw, Finn Bálor vacated the Universal Championship due to a shoulder injury incurred at SummerSlam. On the same night, General Manager Mick Foley scheduled a fatal four-way elimination match for the next week's Raw to crown a new champion. Seth Rollins, Kevin Owens, Big Cass, and Roman Reigns each qualified for the match by defeating Sami Zayn, Neville, Rusev, and Chris Jericho, respectively. Owens subsequently won the WWE Universal Championship.

Also on the post-SummerSlam Raw, Sasha Banks was declared to be out of action due to an injury, reportedly up to two months. However, WWE Women's Champion Charlotte's victory celebration was interrupted by Bayley, who was announced by Mick Foley as the Raw women's division's newest member. Bayley subsequently defeated Brooke and then Charlotte in a non-title match on the September 5 episode. The following week, a triple threat match between Banks, Bayley, and Brooke ended in a double pin for Bayley and Banks, turning Charlotte's title defense at Clash of Champions into a triple threat match.

Also, The Dudley Boyz (Bubba Ray Dudley and D-Von Dudley) announced their retirement, but were first confronted by The Shining Stars (Primo and Epico) and then attacked by Luke Gallows and Karl Anderson, who put D-Von through a table.

After SmackDown unveiled their new titles on the post-SummerSlam SmackDown, the WWE Women's Championship and WWE Tag Team Championship were subsequently renamed to Raw Women's Championship and Raw Tag Team Championship, respectively. Also, the finals of the Cruiserweight Classic occurred on September 14, 2016, and T. J. Perkins became the inaugural WWE Cruiserweight Champion for the Raw brand.

Following SummerSlam, Sheamus and Cesaro would continue trading victories in their Best of Seven series, with Sheamus winning the next two matches and Cesaro winning the following three. The seventh match was then scheduled for Clash of Champions.

Roman Reigns and Rusev continued their rivalry over the latter's United States Championship. On the September 12 episode of Raw, Reigns lost his match thanks to a distraction from Rusev. The following week, Rusev was scheduled to defend the title against Reigns at Clash of Champions.

=== SmackDown ===
On the August 23 episode of SmackDown, AJ Styles was declared the No. 1 contender for the WWE World Championship at Backlash. Styles also defeated Dolph Ziggler to prevent him from being inserted into the title match as well.

When Randy Orton spoke about his match against Brock Lesnar and his future, he was interrupted by Bray Wyatt, and the two were scheduled for a match at Backlash. On August 29, 2016, WWE scheduled a rematch between Lesnar and Orton for a WWE house show on September 24 in Chicago, Illinois, where Lesnar defeated Orton.

Also on the following SmackDown, the WWE SmackDown Women's Championship and WWE SmackDown Tag Team Championship were unveiled for the brand. SmackDown's six active women were scheduled to compete in a six-pack elimination challenge for the title at Backlash, while a tag team tournament occurred over the next few weeks, culminating in a final match for the tag team titles at Backlash.

== Results ==
| No. | Results | Stipulations | Times |
|---|---|---|---|
| 1^{P} | The Usos (Jey Uso and Jimmy Uso), American Alpha (Chad Gable and Jason Jordan), and The Hype Bros (Mojo Rawley and Zack Ryder) defeated Breezango (Fandango and Tyler Breeze), The Ascension (Konnor and Viktor), and The Vaudevillains (Aiden English and Simon Gotch) by pinfall | 12-man tag team match | 14:32 |
| 2^{P} | Sami Zayn and Neville defeated The Dudley Boyz (Bubba Ray Dudley and D-Von Dudley) by pinfall | Tag team match | 7:55 |
| 3^{P} | Sheamus defeated Cesaro by pinfall | Singles match First in the best of seven series | 14:10 |
| 4 | Chris Jericho and Kevin Owens defeated Enzo Amore and Big Cass by pinfall | Tag team match | 12:09 |
| 5 | Charlotte defeated Sasha Banks (c) by pinfall | Singles match for the WWE Women's Championship | 13:53 |
| 6 | The Miz (c) (with Maryse) defeated Apollo Crews by pinfall | Singles match for the WWE Intercontinental Championship | 5:38 |
| 7 | AJ Styles defeated John Cena by pinfall | Singles match | 23:14 |
| 8 | Luke Gallows and Karl Anderson defeated The New Day (Kofi Kingston and Xavier Woods) (c) (with Jon Stewart) by disqualification | Tag team match for the WWE Tag Team Championship | 9:11 |
| 9 | Dean Ambrose (c) defeated Dolph Ziggler by pinfall | Singles match for the WWE World Championship | 15:17 |
| 10 | Nikki Bella, Natalya, and Alexa Bliss (Note: Nikki, returning from injury, was a surprise last-minute replacement for Eva Marie, who was suspended just days before SummerSlam for violating WWE's Wellness Policy.) defeated Becky Lynch, Naomi, and Carmella by pinfall | Six-woman tag team match | 11:04 |
| 11 | Finn Bálor defeated Seth Rollins by pinfall | Singles match for the inaugural WWE Universal Championship | 19:24 |
| 12 | Brock Lesnar (with Paul Heyman) defeated Randy Orton by technical knockout | Singles match | 11:51 |
(c) / – the champion(s) heading into the match; P / – the match was broadcast on the pre-show
