= NXT TakeOver: Brooklyn =

2015 WWE Network event

- Promotional poster featuring various NXT wrestlers
- Promotion: WWE
- Brand: NXT
- Date: August 22, 2015
- City: Brooklyn, New York
- Venue: Barclays Center
- Attendance: 15,589
- Tagline: The Battle For Brooklyn

WWE event chronology
← Previous; Battleground	Next → SummerSlam

NXT TakeOver chronology
← Previous; Unstoppable	Next → Respect

NXT TakeOver: Brooklyn chronology
← Previous; First	Next → II

NXT TakeOver: Brooklyn was a 2015 professional wrestling livestreaming event produced by WWE, held exclusively for wrestlers from the promotion's developmental territory, NXT. It was the sixth NXT TakeOver event and the inaugural TakeOver: Brooklyn. It took place on Saturday, August 22, 2015, at the Barclays Center in Brooklyn, New York and aired exclusively on the WWE Network. This was the first of four consecutive TakeOver: Brooklyn events to take place at the arena.

This was the first night of what was billed as a WWE "triple-header" at the arena, with the main roster's SummerSlam taking place the following evening and Raw the night after that. This was the first TakeOver to be held outside of NXT's home venue at the time, Full Sail University in Winter Park, Florida; WWE promoted it as NXT being "on the biggest stage yet". It was also the first TakeOver to have its own subseries of TakeOvers, as well as the first TakeOver held as a support show for one of WWE's main roster pay-per-view and livestreaming events.

There were two main events for the show: a ladder match for the NXT Championship with reigning champion Finn Bálor defending the title against former champion Kevin Owens, and a singles match for the NXT Women's Championship, where Sasha Banks defended her title against Bayley. A match for the NXT Tag Team Championship was also part of the show with The Vaudevillains (Aiden English and Simon Gotch) capturing the championship. TakeOver: Brooklyn was the first WWE-promoted event appearance of Japanese wrestler Jushin Thunder Liger, who made a one-off appearance for the company in a match against Tyler Breeze. The show also marked the TakeOver debut of Apollo Crews, who defeated Tye Dillinger.

The event is best remembered for the NXT Women's Championship match between Sasha Banks and Bayley which was widely acclaimed. The match has been cited by many as the start of the Women's Revolution in North America. Its impact reshaped industry standards, setting a new benchmark that has significantly influenced subsequent generations of female wrestlers.

== Production ==
=== Background ===
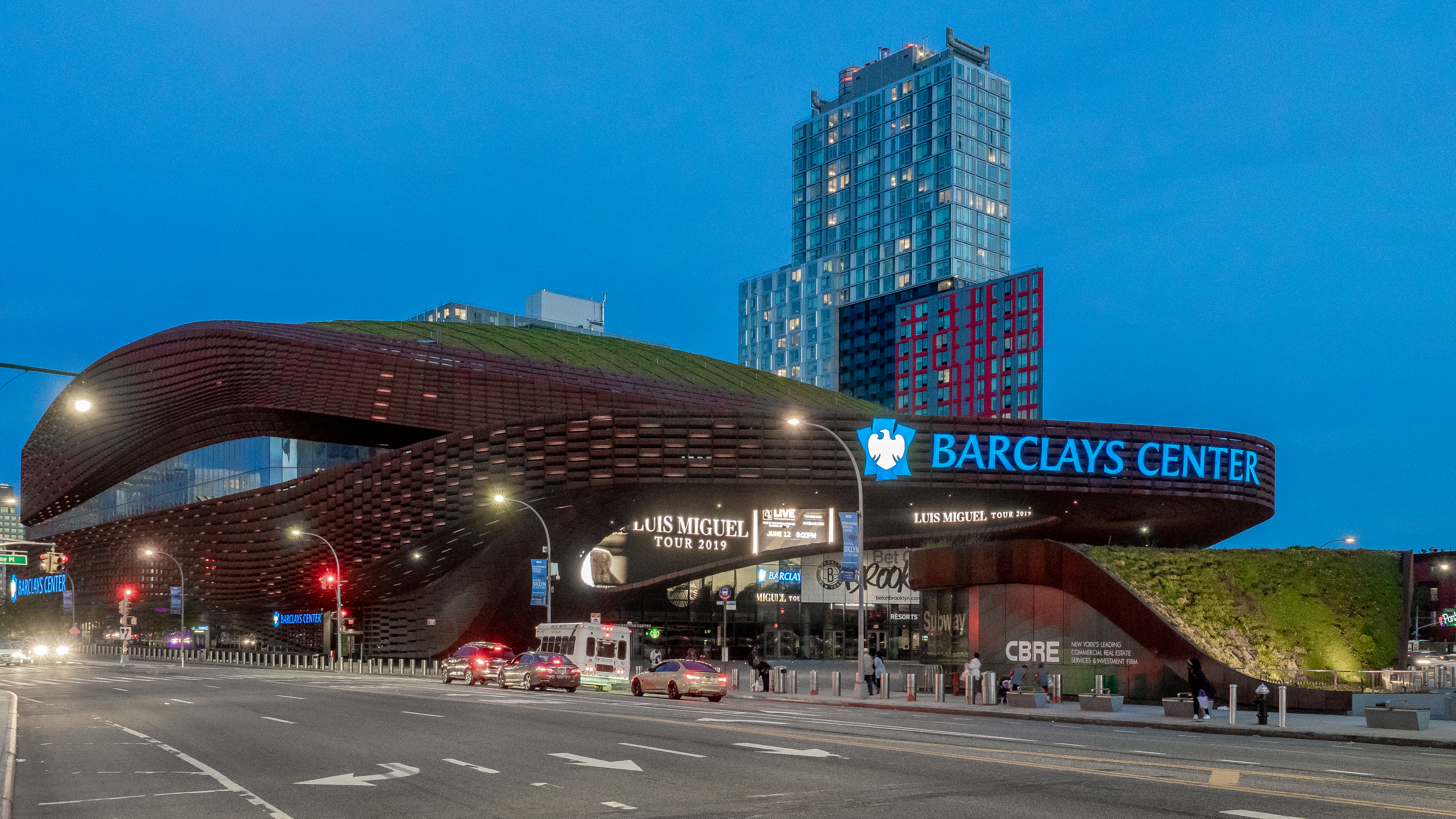
This sixth NXT TakeOver event was the first of four consecutive years for the annual TakeOver: Brooklyn to be held at the Barclays Center in Brooklyn, New York.

TakeOver was a series of professional wrestling events that began in May 2014, as WWE's developmental territory, NXT, held its second WWE Network-exclusive livestreaming event, billed as TakeOver. The "TakeOver" moniker subsequently became the branding for all of NXT's major events held periodically throughout the year.

On July 2, 2015, WWE announced that the sixth TakeOver event would take place on Saturday, August 22, 2015, the day before the SummerSlam event for the main roster. It was also revealed that it would be held in the same venue as SummerSlam, the Barclays Center in Brooklyn, New York, thus titled TakeOver: Brooklyn, becoming the first TakeOver to be named after its host city. This would also mark the first TakeOver held outside of NXT's home venue at the time, Full Sail University in Winter Park, Florida, as well as the first TakeOver to be held as a support show for one of WWE's main roster events. WWE promoted the show as "featuring the next generation of WWE... on the biggest stage yet", referring to the 13,000+ capacity of the Barclays Center, compared to the 400-seat arena at Full Sail University and the various other smaller arenas that NXT had held shows at in the United States.

=== Storylines ===
The event included matches that resulted from scripted storylines. Results were predetermined by WWE's writers on the NXT brand, while storylines were produced on WWE's weekly television program, NXT.

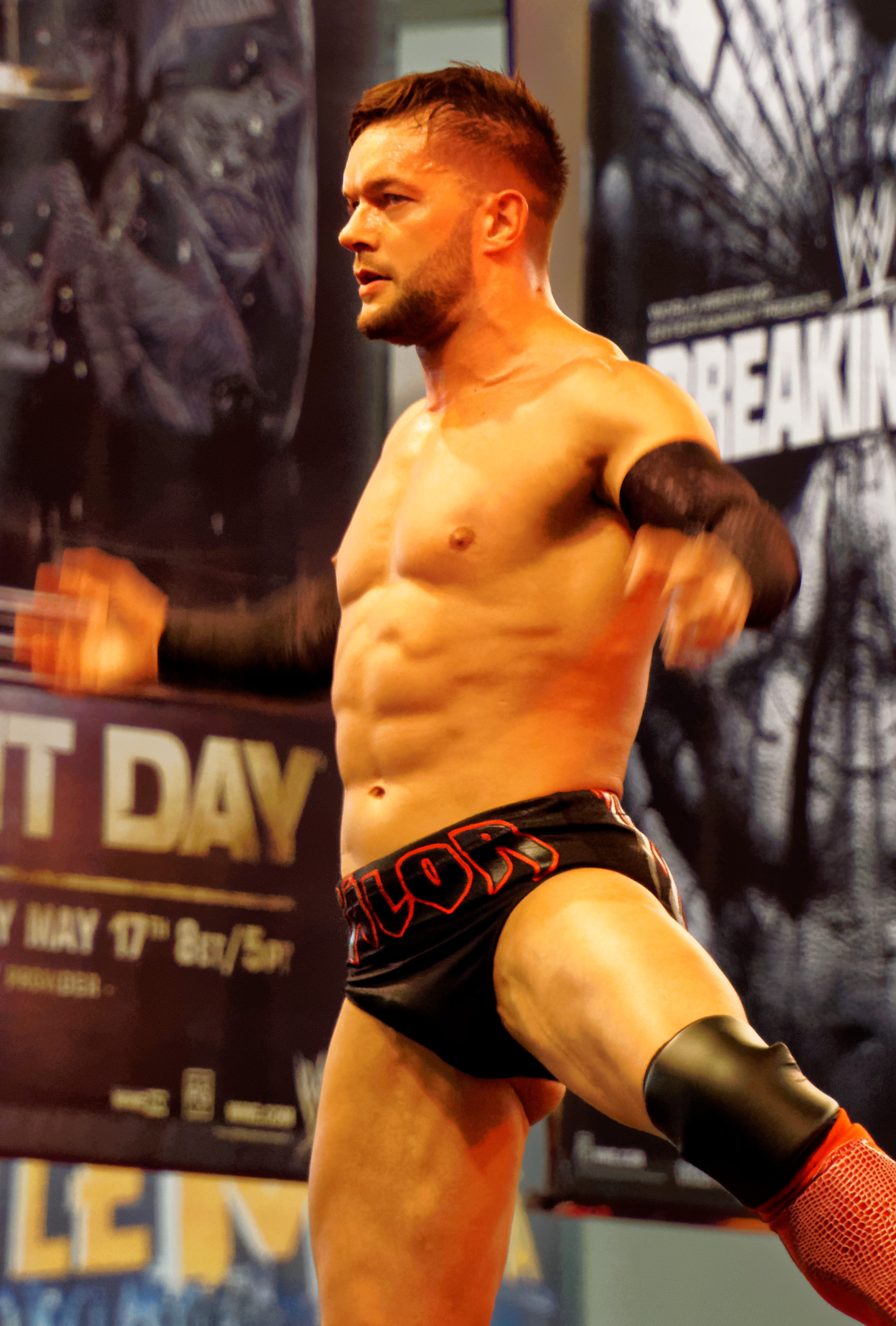
Finn Bálor defended his NXT Championship

The main event of the show saw Finn Bálor defending his NXT Championship against Kevin Owens in a ladder match. The storyline between the duo started in February 2015 at TakeOver: Rival, when Owens captured the NXT Championship while Bálor won a tournament to become the number one contender to the championship. Bálor got his title shot on the March 25 episode of NXT; despite claiming that he did not need "The Demon" to beat Owens, the champion prevailed over his unpainted challenger by taking advantage of a storyline leg injury. However, Bálor once again became number one contender at TakeOver: Unstoppable in May when he beat Tyler Breeze. This earned Bálor another title match against Owens, set for July 4 at The Beast in the East. After using body paint to transform into The Demon, Bálor defeated Owens to become the new NXT Champion in his "second home" of Japan. At the 2015 San Diego Comic-Con on July 9, a title rematch was announced as the main event for TakeOver: Brooklyn. On the August 5 episode of NXT, Owens requested for the stipulation of a ladder match, claiming he did not want to suffer NXT General Manager William Regal costing him the title in a situation alike the Montreal Screwjob; this was accepted by Bálor, and made official the next week.

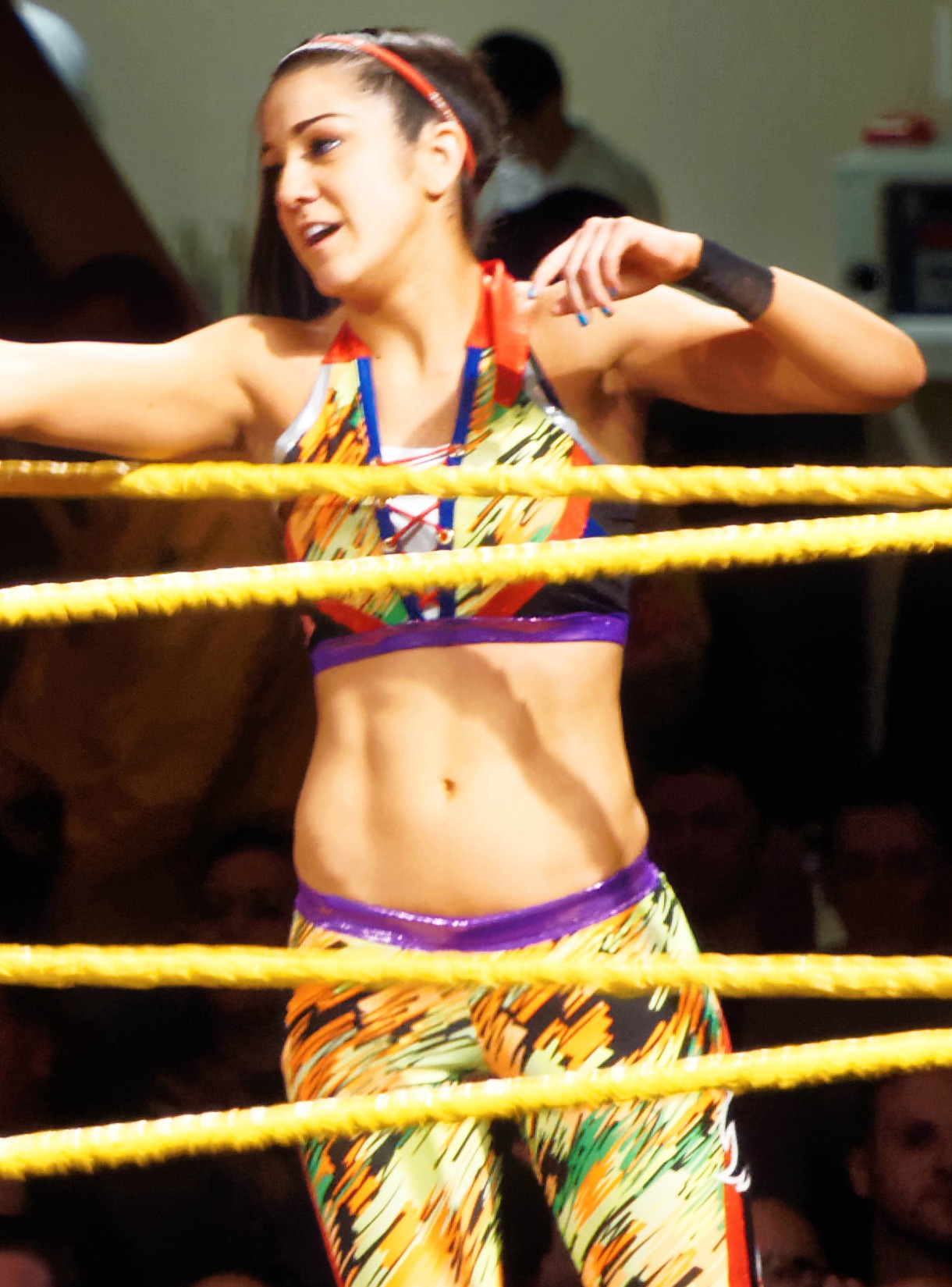
Bayley challenged for the NXT Women's Championship at the event

The co-main event was for the NXT Women's Championship, contested between champion Sasha Banks and challenger Bayley. It was described as the "arrogant and ultra-talented champ" taking on the "lovable ... ultimate underdog" by The Baltimore Sun. This was the culmination of a rivalry between the duo and a long storyline for Bayley which began over two years prior. In June 2013, both Bayley (debuting an innocent character) and Banks participated in the tournament to crown the first NXT Women's Champion, but both were eliminated in the first round. Banks aligned herself with Summer Rae that September to form "The BFFs". She then changed her gimmick to "The Boss", while Bayley aligned herself with Charlotte. Despite Rae and Banks attempting to persuade Bayley to join their alliance, it was Charlotte who turned on Bayley in November to join The BFFs. In early 2014, Bayley, now backed up by Natalya, scored multiple wins over Banks while feuding with The BFFs, but Banks defeated Bayley in May during the first round of a tournament for the vacant NXT Women's Championship. In July, The BFFs disbanded, and Bayley failed to defeat Rae for a title shot. Bayley finally became the number one contender for the title by beating Banks in August, only to lose to champion Charlotte at TakeOver: Fatal 4-Way in September, and again in a title rematch the next month. After the first match, Charlotte saved Bayley from an attack by Banks; after the second, the duo shook hands. In October 2014, Bayley's friend Becky Lynch turned on her to join Sasha Banks, so Bayley again allied with Charlotte to feud against Banks and Lynch. An attack by Banks and Lynch caused a storyline knee injury for Bayley in November, while Charlotte beat Banks at TakeOver: R Evolution to retain her title in December 2014. Bayley returned in January 2015, saving Charlotte from Banks and Lynch. Charlotte then snatched her title belt from Bayley, resulting in Bayley attacking her. This caused a fatal-four-way match to be set up between the four women at TakeOver: Rival. Banks won the match and the NXT Women's Championship. When Bayley refused to turn her back on her supporters despite her failings, Emma slapped her to start a feud in March 2015. In April, Becky Lynch defeated Bayley and Charlotte in a triple threat match for a title shot. Bayley's woes continued when she lost to Emma in May, as well as being ruled out of action with a hand injury, for which she blamed Emma for. Meanwhile, Sasha Banks racked up successful title defenses in singles action with two against Charlotte, one against Alexa Bliss, and at TakeOver: Unstoppable, one against Becky Lynch. Bayley returned on the July 22 episode of NXT, where she defeated Emma and announced her championship aspirations, but first challenged Charlotte to prove her credentials. After Bayley defeated Charlotte on the August 5 episode of NXT, she earned a title shot by beating Becky Lynch the following week, earning a title match for Banks' NXT Women's Championship at TakeOver: Brooklyn.

On the undercard, the NXT Tag Team Championship was defended by Blake and Murphy against The Vaudevillains (Aiden English and Simon Gotch. On the January 28 episode of NXT, Blake and Murphy defeated The Lucha Dragons (Sin Cara and Kalisto) to win the NXT Tag Team Championship for the first time. Over the summer, The Vaudevillains started to push for the team to get a match against Blake and Murphy for the championship, strengthening their argument when they defeated Enzo Amore and Colin Cassady to be named number one contenders. They would later lose the match to Blake and Murphy before a rematch was scheduled for TakeOver: Brooklyn.

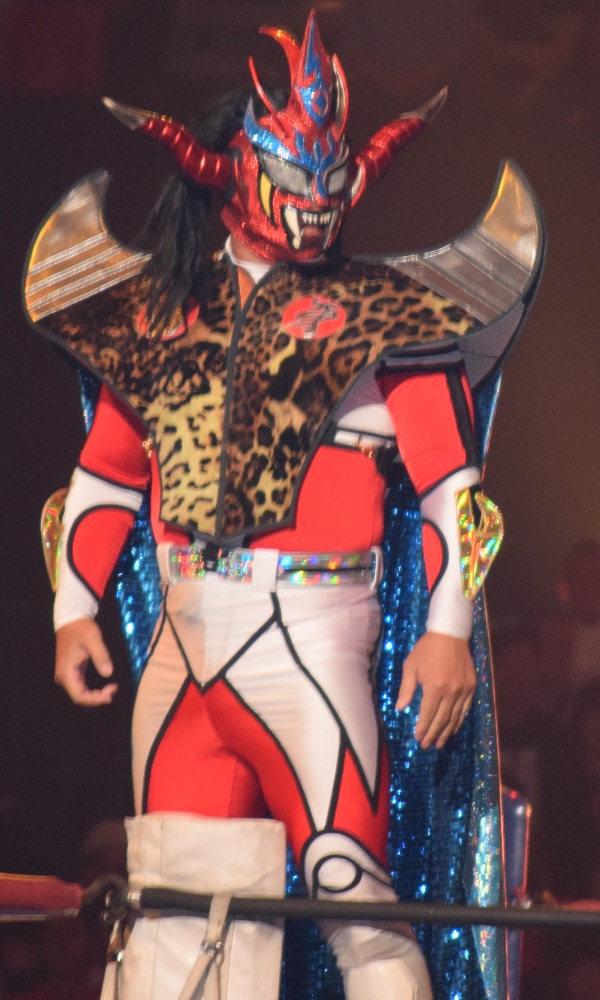
Jushin Thunder Liger from New Japan Pro-Wrestling made his NXT debut at the event

In the weeks following the announcement of TakeOver: Brooklyn, Tyler Breeze would often complain to on-screen NXT General Manager William Regal that he "wanted competition", which Regal later announced in the form of New Japan Pro-Wrestling (NJPW) wrestler Jushin Thunder Liger. The unusual deal between the two promotions had come about when WWE approached NJPW about bringing Liger in for the event as a special guest, which was accepted by NJPW.

In early 2015, Uhaa Nation signed a WWE contract and reported to the WWE Performance Center on April 6. Nation made his first televised appearance on the May 6 episode of NXT, where he officially signed his contract. This was followed by a vignette promoting his upcoming debut. Nation started working NXT house shows the following month. On August 5, it was announced that Nation would be known under the ring name "Apollo Crews", and that he would be making his televised debut on August 22 at TakeOver: Brooklyn. His opponent was later identified as Tye Dillinger and the match was announced as the sixth match of the actual TakeOver broadcast. Crews, however, made his actual television debut at the August 13 tapings, defeating Martin Stone. The match against Stone was not aired, and WWE showed the first four matches taped in Brooklyn prior to the live broadcast instead.

== Event ==
=== Preliminary matches ===
The first match saw Jushin Thunder Liger face Tyler Breeze. Liger executed a "Liger Bomb" on Breeze to win the match.

Next, Blake and Murphy defended the NXT Tag Team Championship against The Vaudevillians (Aiden English and Simon Gotch). Before the match, Blue Pants appeared to support The Vaudevillains. Gotch and English executed the "Whirling Dervish" on Murphy to win the titles.

After that, Apollo Crews faced Tye Dillinger. Crews executed a gorilla press drop followed by a standing moonsault on Dillinger to win the match.

In the fourth match, Baron Corbin faced Samoa Joe. The match ended when Joe applied the "Coquina Clutch" on Corbin. Corbin passed out and Joe won by technical submission.

In the penultimate match, Sasha Banks defended the NXT Women's Championship against Bayley. During the match, Banks applied the "Bank Statement" on Bayley, but Bayley countered the hold to apply the Bank Statement on Banks, with Banks reaching the ropes to force Bayley to break the hold. Bayley executed a "Bayley-to-Belly Suplex" on Banks for a near-fall. In the end, Bayley executed an inverted frankensteiner off the top rope on Banks and a second Bayley-to-Belly Suplex on Banks for a pinfall to win the title. After the match, Becky Lynch and Charlotte celebrated with Bayley. Banks hugged Bayley and Bayley, Lynch, Charlotte, and Banks posed for the audience.

=== Main event ===
In the main event, Finn Bálor defended the NXT Championship against Kevin Owens in a ladder match. During the match, Bálor and Owens fought in the crowd, where Bálor performed a back body drop over the barricade on Owens. Bálor ran across the broadcast table to perform a running front dropkick into a ladder on Owens. Bálor executed a "Coup de Grâce" on Owens and attempted to retrieve the title belt, but Owens pulled Bálor off the ladder, executing a powerbomb on Bálor. Bálor dove off the ring apron on Owens but Owens avoided and executed a powerbomb onto the ring apron on Bálor. In the climax, Bálor smashed Owens's face into the ladder, who fell onto another ladder, as Balor executed a Coup de Grâce off a ladder on Owens and retrieved the title for the win.

== Reception ==
NXT TakeOver: Brooklyn received widespread critical acclaim. Nick Tylwalk of Canoe.ca rated the event 8 out of 10, stating that "while it might not have been the best NXT card to date, it didn't disappoint, as it was headlined by two title matches that matched great in-ring action with solid build-ups." Tylwalk's best-rated match was the NXT Championship ladder match at 9.5 out of 10, and the worst rated match was Corbin-Joe at 4 out of 10. He also highlighted the progress of NXT, writing that it "would have been unthinkable even a few years ago" that "as many people in the same venue that will take in SummerSlam" would pay to "watch the developmental arm of the WWE". Overall, Tylwalk felt that with NXT, it "sure looked" like "WWE has finally manufactured for itself what it's lacked since the heyday of WCW: real competition".

Benjamin Tucker of the Pro Wrestling Torch Newsletter attended in person both NXT TakeOver: Brooklyn and WWE SummerSlam (a day later in the same venue). He gave Brooklyn a 9.0 score, noting that it was "met with near-universal praise", higher than SummerSlam, which rated 6.5 and "was met with ridicule and scorn by the night's end". Apart from approving of its "excellent wrestling", Tucker praised and contrasted the superior writing of Brooklyn with SummerSlam: "NXT provided simple stories, but they were easy to follow and made the viewer root for the good guys to prevail", in addition to "no chicanery". Yet SummerSlam had convoluted stories, "confusingly-presented characters" and "terrible" swerves. The NXT Women's Championship match, a "grueling 20-minute match that put over both competitors and the title they were fighting for", was said to be a "serious Match of the Year contender" and a cut above all the SummerSlam matches a day later.

Darren Gutteridge from Pro Wrestling Dot Net described the event as "fantastic", while declaring that the "brand didn't look out of place on the bigger stage of the Barclays Center, and that is truly remarkable given how young NXT is." He felt that the Women's Championship match was the match of the show and a "perfect crescendo of build, character, and in-ring work", the NXT Championship match was a "very admirable effort" with high "storytelling value" for a ladder match. Gutteridge praised the tag title match as "both teams put forward some of their best work to date". For the remaining singles matches, he felt that the quality of Joe-Corbin was a pleasant surprise, declared that Crews "looked liked he belonged from the second he walked out", but wrote that the Breeze-Liger opener "felt a little ordinary".

Dave Meltzer's Wrestling Observer Newsletter rated the Women's Championship match as the best of the show at 4.5 out of 5 stars, and the NXT Championship match 4.25 stars. The worst rated match was Crews-Dillinger at 1.5 stars, with the three other matches on the live special episode rated between 2 and 3 stars.

NXT TakeOver: Brooklyn won the 2015 Show of the Year Award and Sasha Banks vs Bayley won Match of the Year at the inaugural NXT Year-End Awards on January 13, 2016. In 2019, Troy L. Smith of cleveland.com released a list of the "50 greatest wrestling pay-per-views of all time" from every professional wrestling promotion in the world, with NXT TakeOver: Brooklyn ranked at number 32.

== Aftermath ==
NXT Women's Champion Bayley made her first appearance since TakeOver: Brooklyn on the September 16 episode of NXT. After she won her match, Sasha Banks interrupted and vowed to defeat Bayley over and over again. NXT general manager William Regal then announced that Bayley would defend the NXT Women's Championship against Banks in the first-ever Iron Woman match in the main event of TakeOver: Respect.

Following the 2015 TakeOver: Brooklyn, many other TakeOvers adopted this naming convention of having the event titled after its host city. This Brooklyn event would also be the first of four annual shows in a subseries of TakeOvers titled TakeOver: Brooklyn. All four of the Brooklyn shows were held at the Barclays Center as support shows for WWE's annual SummerSlam. This in turn also made it the first TakeOver to have its own subseries of TakeOver events. While TakeOver: New York in 2019 was also held at the Barclays Center, it did not continue the Brooklyn subseries, and was instead held in April as a support show for WrestleMania 35 and was also instead named after the U.S. state instead of the city. In turn, the final TakeOver: Brooklyn event was the 2018 event, with 2019 TakeOver: Toronto instead being held as that year's support show for SummerSlam.

== Results ==
No.	Results	Stipulations	Times
1^{N}	The Hype Bros (Zack Ryder and Mojo Rawley), Enzo Amore, and Colin Cassady defeated Dash Wilder, Scott Dawson, Chad Gable, and Jason Jordan by pinfall	Eight-man tag team match	12:50
2^{N}	Eva Marie defeated Carmella by pinfall	Singles match	7:17
3^{N}	Bull Dempsey defeated Elias Samson by pinfall	Singles match	4:51
4^{N}	Emma defeated Becky Lynch, Charlotte, and Dana Brooke by pinfall	Fatal four-way match	10:50
5	Jushin Thunder Liger defeated Tyler Breeze by pinfall	Singles match	8:42
6	The Vaudevillains (Aiden English and Simon Gotch) (with Blue Pants) defeated Blake and Murphy (c) (with Alexa Bliss) by pinfall	Tag team match for the NXT Tag Team Championship	10:16
7	Apollo Crews defeated Tye Dillinger by pinfall	Singles match	4:43
8	Samoa Joe defeated Baron Corbin by technical submission	Singles match	10:21
9	Bayley defeated Sasha Banks (c) by pinfall	Singles match for the NXT Women's Championship	18:22
10	Finn Bálor (c) defeated Kevin Owens	Ladder match for the NXT Championship	21:45
(c) / – the champion(s) heading into the match; N / – the match was taped for a future broadcast of NXT
