= Wesley Blake =

American professional wrestler (born 1987)

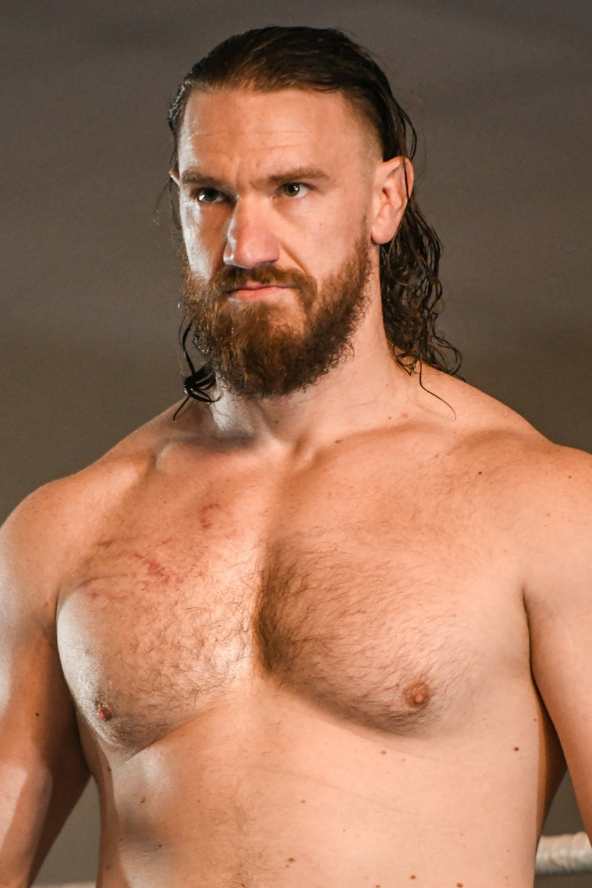
- Blake in 2022

Personal information
- Born: Cory James Weston; September 4, 1987 (age 39) San Marcos, Texas, U.S.
- Education: Texas State University
- Spouse: Sara Lee (m. 2017; died 2022)
- Children: 3

Professional wrestling career
- Ring name(s): Blake; Cory Weston; Wesley Blake; Westin Blake
- Billed height: 6 ft 1 in (1.85 m)
- Billed weight: 240 lb (109 kg)
- Billed from: San Antonio, Texas
- Trained by: Dory Funk Jr.
- Debut: 2011

Cory James Weston (born September 4, 1987) is an American professional wrestler. He is signed to WWE, where he works as a producer on the NXT brand and coach at the WWE Performance Center, having previously been an active competitor with the company, where he performed under the ring name Wesley Blake.

Weston debuted in 2011 under his real name on the Florida independent circuit, most notably for Dory Funk Jr.'s Funking Conservatory. He signed with WWE in 2013, portraying a cowboy gimmick in NXT during his first year. He later formed a tag team with Buddy Murphy, and the two, managed by Alexa Bliss, won the NXT Tag Team Championship once. After several years, he formed a stable with Jaxson Ryker and Steve Cutler called The Forgotten Sons. In 2020, the stable began working on SmackDown. He was released from WWE on April 15, 2021. Soon after, he announced on his social media that his new ring name would be Westin Blake. In 2024, Blake returned to WWE as a producer for the NXT brand and coach at the WWE Performance Center.

== Early life ==
Cory James Weston was born on September 4, 1987, in San Marcos, Texas. He was brought up by his single mother. Weston played football at the all-state high school level, including for the Medina Valley Panthers in 2005, where he played as the middle linebacker. He graduated from Texas State University, where he was a strength instructor and also played college football.

== Professional wrestling career ==
=== Funking Conservatory (2011–2013) ===
Weston wanted to be a professional wrestler since the age of 3. He eventually became a student of Dory Funk Jr.'s professional wrestling school, the Funking Conservatory, appearing on the school's !Bang! TV show under his real name. Immediately after graduating from university, Weston moved to Ocala, Florida in 2011, where the Funking Conservatory was located. Documented to have been wrestling there since May 2011, Weston managed to become the FC Heavyweight Champion, as well as the European Champion and the Florida Champion. Weston wrestled against Jerry Lawler in an eight-person tag team match in May 2013, which was Lawler's first match since suffering a heart attack in September 2012.

=== WWE ===
==== Blake and Murphy (2013–2016) ====
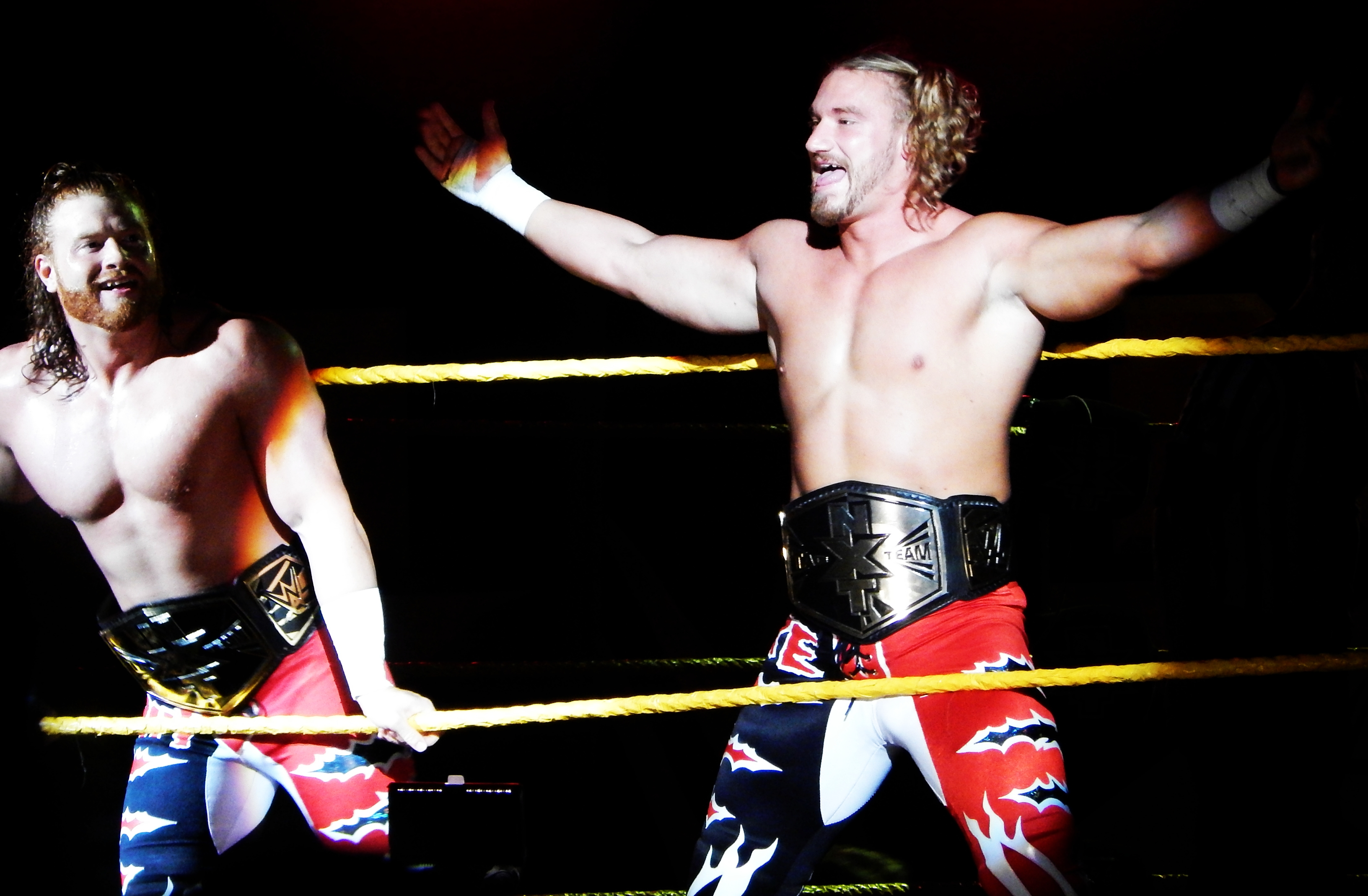
Blake (right) and Murphy as NXT Tag Team Champions in May 2015

Weston signed with WWE in June 2013 and reported to NXT in July 2013 when the WWE Performance Center opened; at the same time as his future NXT tag team partner Buddy Murphy. Weston made his television debut as Wesley Blake on the January 22, 2014 episode of NXT with the character of a cowboy and lost his debut match to Adrian Neville. Blake continued in his jobber role with losses in singles matches to the likes of Adam Rose, Mason Ryan and Sin Cara, as well as a loss in a tag-team match against the Ascension with Cal Bishop as his partner.

In August 2014, Blake abandoned the cowboy character and formed a tag team with Buddy Murphy. On the August 14 episode of NXT, Blake and Murphy were defeated in the first round of a number one contender's tag team tournament by Kalisto and Sin Cara, later known as The Lucha Dragons. For the rest of 2014, Blake and Murphy lost multiple matches to teams such as The Lucha Dragons and The Vaudevillains (Aiden English and Simon Gotch). Also in October 2014, Blake and Murphy were involved in a tag-team battle royal to determine the number one contenders to the NXT Tag Team Championship; they were eliminated from the match by The Ascension.

Blake and Murphy defeated The Vaudevillains on the January 21, 2015 episode of NXT and a week later, defeated The Lucha Dragons to win the NXT Tag Team Championship. At NXT TakeOver: Rival, Blake and Murphy, now billed simply by their last names, defeated The Lucha Dragons in a rematch for the titles. Following that, Blake and Murphy started a feud with Enzo Amore and Colin Cassady, who were intent on capturing the tag titles. At NXT TakeOver: Unstoppable, they retained their NXT Tag Team Championship against Amore and Cassady after interference from Alexa Bliss, who then aligned herself with them. After several successful title defenses, Blake and Murphy lost the championships to The Vaudevillians at NXT TakeOver: Brooklyn, ending their reign at 219 days.

On the May 18, 2016 episode of NXT, after losing to Shinsuke Nakamura and Austin Aries, Bliss and Blake walked away from Murphy, teasing a split for the team. Following Bliss's main roster call-up in the 2016 WWE draft, Blake was used sporadically on NXT television as an enhancement talent, with his final televised appearance being a match against Murphy on the October 12 episode of NXT, which quickly ended in a no-contest as both men were attacked by an interfering Samoa Joe.

==== The Forgotten Sons and departure (2017–2021) ====
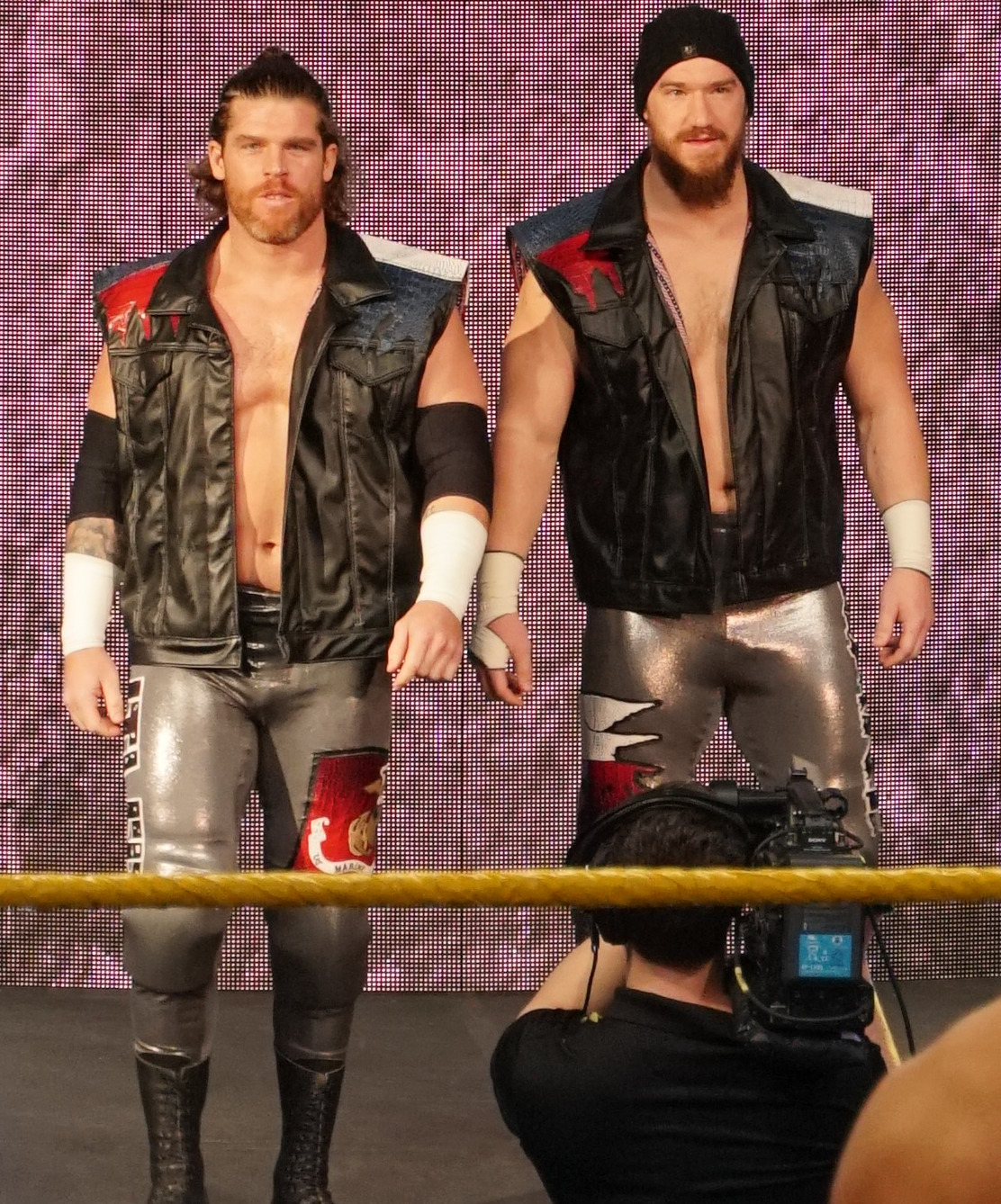
Blake (right) with Steve Cutler in April 2018

After a long absence from television, Blake returned on the May 10, 2017 episode of NXT, confronting Drew McIntyre in a backstage segment. On the May 24, 2017 episode of NXT, returning to his previous cowboy gimmick, Blake lost in a match against McIntyre. He was then absent from television for the remainder of 2017, forming a tag team with Steve Cutler at NXT live events as "The Forgotten Sons".

The team (now featuring Jaxson Ryker) debuted on the August 29, 2018 episode of NXT in a segment with general manager William Regal. Their in-ring debuts took place the following week when Blake and Cutler defeated The Street Profits after a distraction from Shane Thorne. On the October 3 episode of NXT, the group defeated the team of Vinny Mixon, Cesar Rise & Torrey Kirsh. Blake and Cutler represented the group in the 2019 Dusty Rhodes Tag Team Classic. They defeated Danny Burch and Oney Lorcan in the first-round and Moustache Mountain in the second-round before losing to Aleister Black and Ricochet in the finals. Blake and Cutler competed in a fatal four-way ladder match for the vacant NXT Tag Team Championship at NXT TakeOver: XXV. Despite interference from Ryker, the two were unsuccessful in winning. The group entered the 2020 Dusty Rhodes Tag Team Classic, but were eliminated in the first round by Imperium.

The trio debuted on SmackDown on the April 10, 2020 episode, defeating Lucha House Party. They appeared on the April 24 episode of SmackDown when they attacked Lucha House Party and SmackDown Tag Team Champions The New Day. The group made their main roster in-ring debut on the May 1 episode, defeating The New Day in a non-title match. They then began portraying themselves as American patriots with Cutler and Ryker highlighting their services in the marines. However, the gimmick was dropped due to a tweet by Jaxson Ryker supporting President Donald Trump which led to serious backstage heat and backlash from many on social media and within the fan base. This resulted in The Forgotten Sons being taken off television. On the December 4 episode of SmackDown, Blake and Cutler, now known as The Knights of the Lone Wolf, made their return accompanying King Corbin to the ring as they helped him defeat Murphy. However, the storyline was aborted since, on February 4, 2021, Cutler was released. On April 15, 2021, Blake was also released from his WWE contract.

=== Control Your Narrative (2021–2022) ===
Westin debuted at the Ring of Honor pay-per-view Final Battle, where he, EC3, and Adam Scherr formed the new Control Your Narrative stable and attacked Eli Isom, Dak Draper and Brian Johnson.

In February 2022, it was announced Blake was joining the Control Your Narrative wrestling promotion created by EC3 and Adam Scherr. The promotion held its last event on July 31.

=== All Elite Wrestling (2022) ===
Blake made his All Elite Wrestling debut on the August 23 episode of Dark, losing to Daniel Garcia.

=== Return to WWE (2024–present) ===
In April 2024, it was reported that Blake had returned to WWE as a producer for the NXT brand and coach at the WWE Performance Center.

== Other media ==
=== Video games ===
Year	Title	Notes	Ref.
2015	WWE 2K16	Video game debut; DLC	
2016	WWE 2K17		

== Personal life ==
On December 30, 2017, Weston who was thirty years old when he married Sara Lee who was twenty five years old. They had a daughter named Piper Weston and two sons named Brady Weston and Case Oliver Weston . Weston's wife Sara Lee committed suicide at the age of thirty on October 5, 2022. Weston became a widower at the age of thirty five.

== Championships and accomplishments ==
- Funking Conservatory
  - FC European Championship (1 time)
  - FC Florida Championship (1 time)
  - FC Heavyweight Championship (1 time)
- Pro Wrestling Illustrated
  - Ranked No. 121 of the top 500 singles wrestlers in the PWI 500 in 2015
- The Wrestling Revolver
  - Revolver World Tag Team Championship (1 time) – with Steve Maclin
- WWE
  - NXT Tag Team Championship (1 time) – with Buddy Murphy
