= The Beast in the East =

2015 WWE Network event

The Beast in the East ビースト・イン・ジ・イースト (Japanese)
- Promotional poster featuring Brock Lesnar
- Promotion: WWE
- Date: July 4, 2015
- City: Sumida, Tokyo, Japan
- Venue: Ryōgoku Kokugikan
- Attendance: 8,646

WWE event chronology
← Previous; Money in the Bank	Next → Battleground

WWE Network specials chronology
← Previous; First	Next → Live from Madison Square Garden

The Beast in the East (ビースト・イン・ジ・イースト (Bīsuto In Ji Īsuto)) was a 2015 professional wrestling livestreaming event produced by the American promotion WWE. It took place on July 4, 2015, at the Ryōgoku Kokugikan in Sumida, Tokyo, Japan. In addition to its live broadcast on the WWE Network streaming service, J Sports also carried the event live in Japan. The event was the first of seven originally scheduled house shows to broadcast as a WWE Network special.

Seven matches were contested at the event, with two of the matches shown exclusively on J Sports. The main event saw John Cena and Dolph Ziggler defeat Kane and King Barrett. In other matches, Chris Jericho wrestled his first televised match since Night of Champions in September 2014, defeating Neville, Finn Bálor (in his "Demon" persona) defeated Kevin Owens to win the NXT Championship, and Brock Lesnar, for whom the event was named after, defeated Kofi Kingston.

== Production ==
=== Background ===
In early 2015, the American company WWE scheduled a house show, a non-televised professional wrestling event, to be held on July 4, 2015, at the Ryōgoku Kokugikan in Sumida, Tokyo, Japan. On May 28, it was revealed that Brock Lesnar was scheduled to appear at the event. This would mark Lesnar's first non-pay-per-view match for WWE since 2004. Lesnar reportedly requested a spot on the show so he and Brad Rheingans could go to Tokyo to visit Masa Saito, who was in bad health. WWE then released a promotional video announcing that the event would no longer be a house show and would instead be broadcast live as a WWE Network special titled The Beast in the East. The name was a reference to Lesnar, whose nickname was "The Beast", and due to the event taking place in the eastern country of Japan.

In addition to livestreaming on the WWE Network, the event also aired live on J Sports in Japan. Replays of the event aired on J Sports 4 in Japan with on demand viewing available on both the WWE Network and J Sports. To date, the show is the only time in WWE history that an event was broadcast live from Japan. This was also the first originally scheduled house show to be broadcast as a WWE Network special.

=== Storylines ===
The card consisted of five matches, that resulted from scripted storylines. Results were predetermined by WWE's writers, with storylines played out on WWE's primary television programs, Raw, SmackDown, and NXT.

After the announcement that the event would air live on the WWE Network, WWE revealed the entire match card for the show. One of the matches scheduled for the event, The New Day vs. Tyson Kidd and Cesaro, could no longer take place due to Tyson Kidd suffering an injury, which was expected to take him out for over a year. Kidd and Cesaro were replaced by The Lucha Dragons. Hideo Itami and Tatsumi Fujinami were also advertised to appear.

Kevin Owens was scheduled to defend his NXT Championship against Finn Bálor at the event. At NXT TakeOver: Rival in February 2015, Owens had captured the NXT Championship while Bálor won a tournament to become number one contender. On the March 25 episode of NXT, Owens prevailed over Bálor, who had dispensed with his 'Demon' facepaint, saying that he did not need the 'Demon' to beat the champion; in the match Owens took advantage of a (kayfabe) leg injury. However, Bálor earned another title shot at NXT TakeOver: Unstoppable in May when he beat Tyler Breeze. Bálor vowed that at Beast in the East, Owens would 'meet the Demon'.

== Event ==
Other on-screen personnel
Role	Name
Commentators	Michael Cole
Commentators	Byron Saxton
Ring announcer	Eden Stiles

=== Preliminary matches ===
Dark matches were held, where Cesaro defeated Diego by submission and The Lucha Dragons (Kalisto and Sin Cara) defeated The New Day (Big E and Xavier Woods).

The first match was Chris Jericho facing Neville. Neville kicked out of a mid-air Codebreaker. However, after Jericho countered a Red Arrow attempt, Jericho forced Neville to submit to the Liontamer for the victory.

Next, Nikki Bella defended the Divas Championship against Tamina and Paige. In the middle of the match, Paige executed the Rampaige on Nikki, only to get a near-fall. Tamina superkicked Paige, which was the last of Paige for the match. Nikki pinned Tamina after a forearm smash for the victory to retain the title.

After that, Brock Lesnar faced Kofi Kingston. Lesnar dominated though being dropkicked to the turnbuckles twice, but it didn't stop him from executing three German suplexes. In the end, Lesnar pinned Kingston after a F-5 for the victory. After the match, Lesnar would deliver more German suplexes and another F-5 on Kingston. Big E and Xavier Woods appeared, but Lesnar ultimately executed F5s on both Big E and Woods.

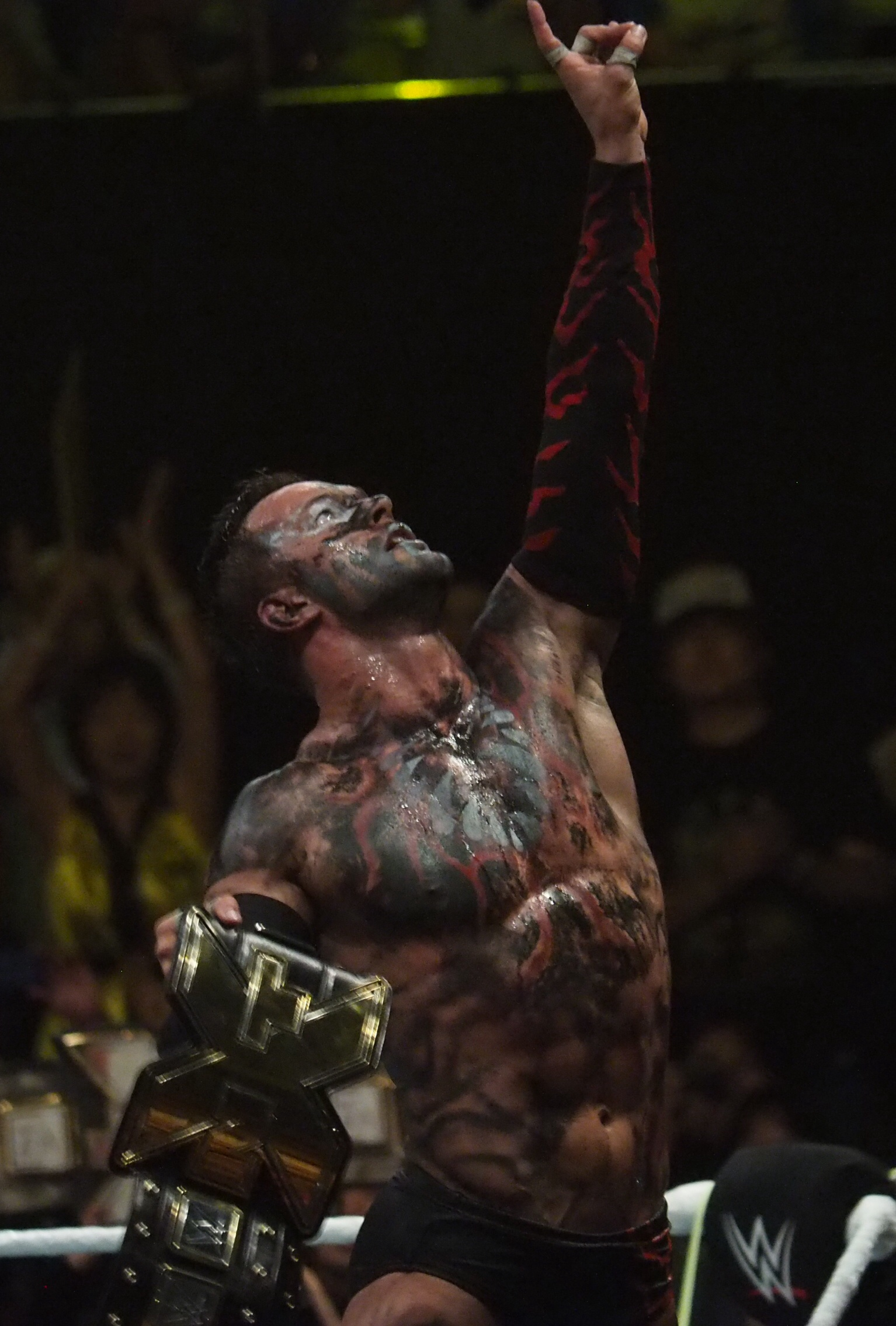
Finn Bálor celebrating his victory after defeating Kevin Owens to win the NXT Championship.

In the fourth match, Kevin Owens defended the NXT Championship against Finn Bálor. Owens mocked John Cena, with whom he had a running feud, with Cena's trademark shoulder tackles, spin-out powerbomb, and Five Knuckle Shuffle. However, Owens became one of the very few people to kick out of the Coup de Grâce. Balor pinned Owens after a second Coup de Grâce for the victory to win the title.

=== Main event ===
The main event was WWE United States Champion John Cena and Dolph Ziggler facing Kane and King Barrett. Barrett and Kane pretty much dominated throughout the match. In the end, Ziggler performed a superkick on Barrett and Cena performed an Attitude Adjustment on Kane for the pin.

== Reception ==
The Beast in the East received generally positive reviews from critics. The Owens-Bálor match was highly praised. PWInsider.com's Mike Johnson called it "a great main event level" match. PWTorch.com's James Caldwell gave the match a four-and-a-half-star rating, the highest rating of the night. 411Mania.com's Larry Csonka praised the look of the show, saying it was far away from "the usual and sanitized WWE TV event".

== Aftermath ==
At the 2015 San Diego Comic-Con on July 9, a Bálor-Owens rematch for the NXT Championship was scheduled for the next NXT TakeOver show in August 2015. Owens later requested for the stipulation of a ladder match, saying that he did not want to suffer NXT General Manager William Regal costing him the title in a situation alike the Montreal Screwjob. Though Bálor never had competed in a ladder match before, he accepted the stipulation and defeated Owens.

== Results ==
No.	Results	Stipulations	Times
1^{D}	Cesaro defeated Diego by submission	Singles match (Note: This match was only broadcast in Japan as part of the J Sports broadcast.)	8:13
2^{D}	The Lucha Dragons (Kalisto and Sin Cara) defeated The New Day (Big E and Xavier Woods)	Tag team match	6:31
3	Chris Jericho defeated Neville by submission	Singles match	16:20
4	Nikki Bella (c) defeated Tamina and Paige	Triple threat match for the WWE Divas Championship	7:03
5	Brock Lesnar defeated Kofi Kingston	Singles match	2:35
6	Finn Bálor defeated Kevin Owens (c)	Singles match for the NXT Championship	19:25
7	Dolph Ziggler and John Cena defeated Kane and King Barrett	Tag team match	23:50
(c) / – the champion(s) heading into the match; D / – this was a dark match
