= Blake and Murphy =

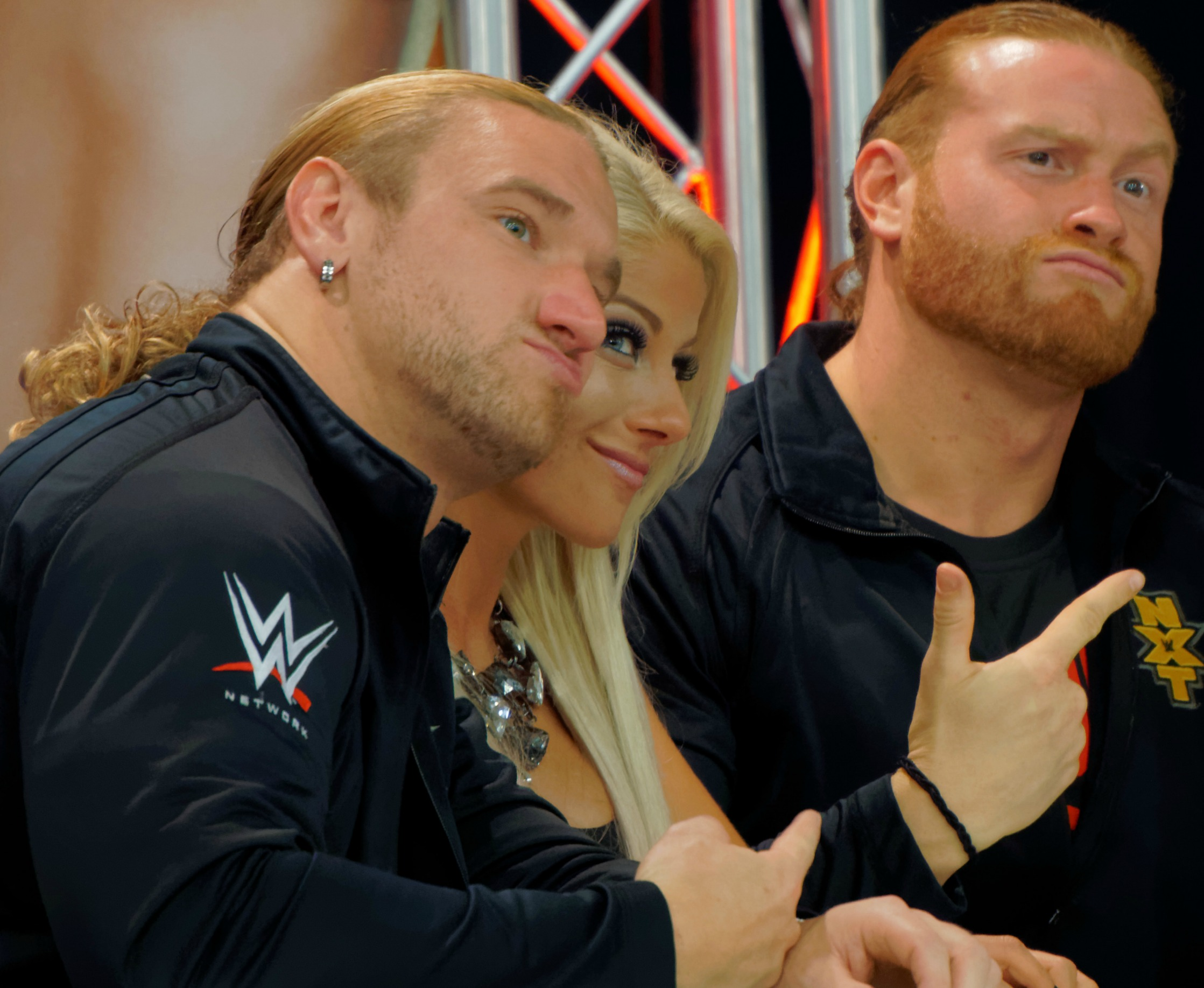
- The three members of the team from left to right: Blake, Bliss and Murphy in April 2016

Tag team
- Members: (Wesley) Blake (Buddy) Murphy; Alexa Bliss
- Name(s): Wesley Blake and Buddy Murphy; Team Thick; Blake and Murphy; The Blake-Alexa-Murphy Factor (BAMF)
- Billed heights: Blake: 6 ft 1 in (1.85 m); Murphy: 5 ft 11 in (1.80 m); Alexa: 5 ft 1 in (1.55 m)
- Combined billed weight: 465 lb (211 kg) (Blake: 240 lbs, Murphy: 225 lbs)
- Debut: August 14, 2014
- Years active: 2014–2016

Blake and Murphy was a villainous professional wrestling tag team in WWE on their developmental territory NXT consisting of Wesley Blake, Buddy Murphy and their valet Alexa Bliss, where they are one-time NXT Tag Team Champions.

== History ==
In August 2014, Wesley Blake abandoned his previous cowboy character and formed a tag team with Buddy Murphy. On the August 14 episode of NXT, Blake and Murphy were defeated in the first round of a number one contender tag team tournament by Kalisto and Sin Cara, later known as The Lucha Dragons. For the rest of 2014, Blake and Murphy lost multiple matches to teams such as the Lucha Dragons and The Vaudevillains (Aiden English and Simon Gotch). Blake and Murphy were once referred to as "Team Thick" in October, but that name was dropped in later episodes. Also in October 2014, Blake and Murphy were involved in a tag-team battle royal to determine the number one contenders to the NXT Tag Team Championship; they were eliminated from the match by The Ascension.

On the January 21, 2015 episode of NXT, Blake and Murphy scored their first-ever televised victory by defeating The Vaudevillains. This led to a title match on the January 28, 2015 episode of NXT (taped on January 15) where Blake and Murphy defeated The Lucha Dragons to win the NXT Tag Team Championship.

At a January 31 NXT house show, Blake and Murphy were billed without their first names. This name change translated to television at NXT TakeOver: Rival, where Blake and Murphy defeated The Lucha Dragons in a rematch for the titles. In March, Blake and Murphy began a rivalry with Enzo Amore and Colin Cassady, while attempting to woo their valet Carmella on several occasions. On the May 13 episode of NXT, Blake and Murphy distracted Carmella during her match with Alexa Bliss, causing her to lose. At NXT TakeOver: Unstoppable, Blake and Murphy defeated Amore and Cassady to retain the NXT Tag Team Championship after interference from Bliss. Blake and Murphy lost the NXT Tag Team Championship to The Vaudevillains at NXT TakeOver: Brooklyn.

Following their championship loss, Blake and Murphy would go on a multi-month losing streak, losing their rematch with The Vaudevillians, while also suffering losses to American Alpha, The Hype Bros, Enzo Amore and Colin Cassady, and The Ascension. On the May 18 episode of NXT, after losing to Shinsuke Nakamura and Austin Aries, Alexa walked away from Blake and Murphy, leaving the duo and later being called up to WWE's main roster as part of the 2016 WWE Draft. On the June 1 episode of NXT, Murphy would revert to his "Buddy Murphy" ring name in a loss against Tye Dillinger. On the June 15 episode of NXT, Blake and Murphy reunited, but after a miscommunication between the two, they were defeated by TM-61. Again, the two attempted to battle The Hype Bros on the July 6, 2016 episode of NXT, but were interrupted by the returning Rhyno, leading to Murphy walking out on Blake. A scheduled match between Blake and Murphy on the October 12 episode of NXT did not take place as both men were defeated by Samoa Joe. The duo then both ceased to appear regularly on television, Furtherly throughout the beginning of 2018, Murphy made his main roster debut by signing with 205 Live, thus having no chance for the reformation of the team or duo. Blake was eventually released from WWE on April 15, 2021, while Murphy was released on June 2, 2021.

== Championships and accomplishments ==
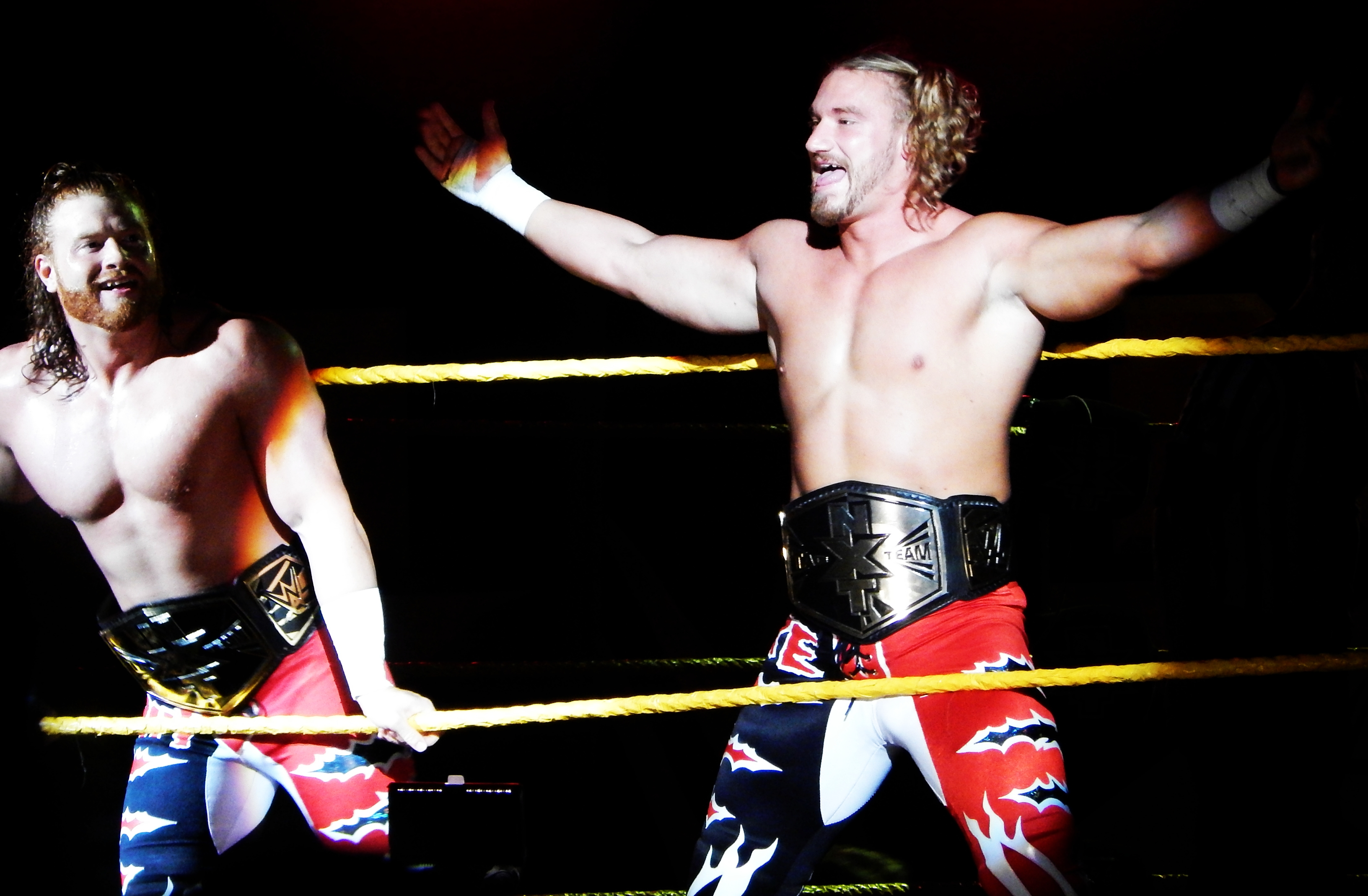
Blake (right) and Murphy (left) as NXT Tag Team Champions in May 2015

- Pro Wrestling Illustrated
  - PWI ranked Murphy #116 of the top 500 singles wrestlers in the PWI 500 in 2015
  - PWI ranked Blake #121 of the top 500 singles wrestlers in the PWI 500 in 2015
- WWE
  - NXT Tag Team Championship (1 time)
