= NXT TakeOver: R Evolution =

2014 WWE Network event

- Official poster featuring various NXT wrestlers
- Promotion: WWE
- Brand: NXT
- Date: December 11, 2014
- City: Winter Park, Florida
- Venue: Full Sail University
- Attendance: 400+

WWE event chronology
← Previous; Survivor Series	Next → TLC: Tables, Ladders, Chairs

NXT TakeOver chronology
← Previous; Fatal 4-Way	Next → Rival

NXT TakeOver: R Evolution was a 2014 professional wrestling livestreaming event produced by WWE, held exclusively for wrestlers from the promotion's developmental territory, NXT. It was the third NXT TakeOver event and took place on Thursday, December 11, 2014, at NXT's home venue at the time, Full Sail University in Winter Park, Florida. The event aired exclusively on the WWE Network.

The show marked the WWE in-ring debut of Kevin Owens, who had signed with the company in the months prior to the event. The main event was for the NXT Championship as Adrian Neville defended against Sami Zayn, with the added stipulation for the match being that Zayn would have to leave NXT if he did not win the championship. The show featured five additional matches, including matches for the NXT Women's Championship and the NXT Tag Team Championship.

== Production ==
=== Background ===
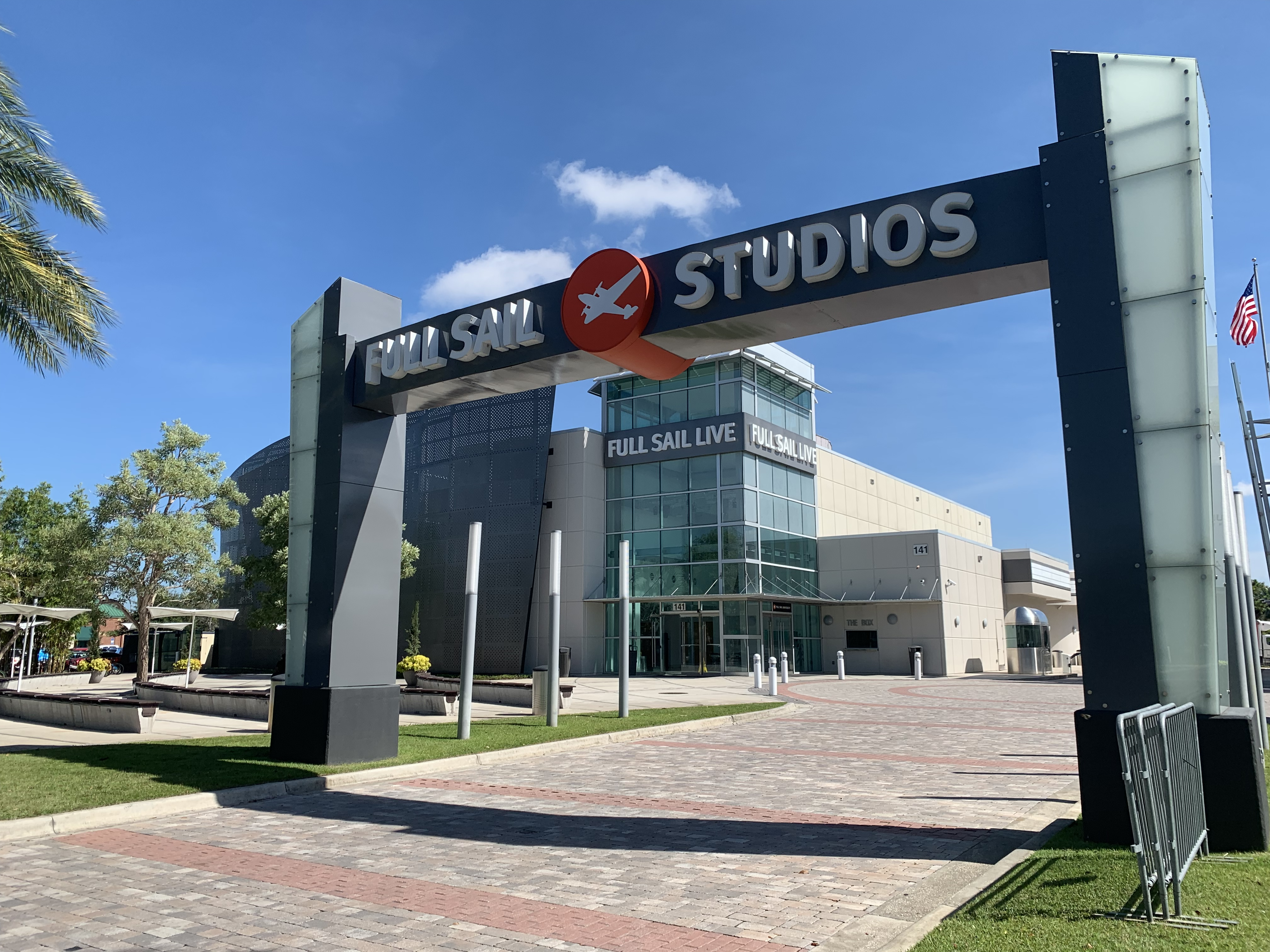
The third NXT TakeOver event was held at NXT's home venue at the time, Full Sail University in Winter Park, Florida.

TakeOver was a series of professional wrestling events that began in May 2014, as WWE's developmental territory, NXT, held its second WWE Network-exclusive livestreaming event, billed as TakeOver. The "TakeOver" moniker subsequently became the branding for all of NXT's major events held periodically throughout the year. R Evolution was scheduled as the third TakeOver event and took place on Saturday, December 11, 2014, at NXT's home venue at the time, Full Sail University in Winter Park, Florida.

=== Storylines ===
The card included matches that resulted from scripted storylines. Results were predetermined by WWE's writers on the NXT brand, while storylines were produced on WWE's weekly television program, NXT.

On November 27, 2013, Adrian Neville became the number one contender for the NXT Championship as he defeated Sami Zayn in a tie-breaker match between the two. After several unsuccessful challenges, Neville was finally able to defeat Bo Dallas for the Championship in main event of NXT Arrival. On the May 8 episode of NXT, Sami Zayn, Tyson Kidd, and Tyler Breeze all participated in a 20-man battle royal where the winner would get a match for the NXT Championship. The match ended in a three way tie between Zayn, Kidd, and Breeze. As a result, the three faced off a week later in a triple-threat match, where Kidd won to become #1 contender. At the first TakeOver, Adrian Neville successfully defended the championship against Tyson Kidd, while Tyler Breeze cheated his way to victory over Sami Zayn to become the number one contender. Following the event, Neville, Zayn, Breeze, and Tyson Kidd became involved in a four way feud, that led to a four way championship match in the main event of TakeOver: Fatal 4-Way. During the match, Neville prevented Zayn from winning the match as he pulled the referee out of the ring to stop the count. Moments later, Neville capitalized on the distraction to win the match and retain the championship. The way Neville regained the championship led to tension between Neville and Zayn, putting a strain on their friendship. With the loss, Zayn felt the need to redeem himself, as he took on and defeated Tyson Kidd, Titus O'Neil, and Tyler Breeze to earn another match for the NXT Championship. During the championship match, Neville appeared to be injured during the match, only to reveal that it was a ruse to trick Zayn to lowering his defenses. A surprised Zayn was quickly rolled up for the pinfall loss. Zayn later responded to comments that he was "too nice" to win the big one by laying out one final challenge to Neville for a match at TakeOver: R Evolution. Zayn also promised that he would quit NXT if he did not win the championship.

In early May 2014, Charlotte entered in the tournament for the vacant NXT Women's Championship, defeating Emma in the first round, Alexa Bliss in the semi-finals, and Natalya in the finals at the first TakeOver, to win the NXT Women's Championship. After a four-month absence from the show, Summer Rae returned on the June 5 episode of NXT, distracting Bayley and allowing Charlotte to get the victory. After the match, The BFFs ("Beautiful Fierce Females" - Charlotte, Summer Rae, and Sasha Banks) attempted to attack Bayley, only to be chased away by Emma and Paige. This led to a six-woman tag team match on the June 12 episode of NXT, which The BFFs lost after Bayley pinned Charlotte. On the July 3 episode of NXT, Charlotte got retribution over Bayley in a tag team match, where she and Banks defeated Bayley and Becky Lynch. After the match, Charlotte let Banks get attacked by Bayley, with Banks officially disbanding the BFFs in a backstage segment later that night. At TakeOver: Fatal 4-Way, Charlotte retained the NXT Women's Championship against Bayley, and after the match, Charlotte saved Bayley from an attack by Sasha Banks. After another successful title defense against Bayley on the October 2 episode of NXT, Charlotte joined forces with Bayley. Afterwards, Banks went on to defeat Lynch and Bayley. After the latter match, Lynch attacked Bayley and joined forces with Banks. Banks and Lynch then defeated Bayley and Charlotte on the November 6 episode of NXT. After winning her match the following week, Banks set her sights on the NXT Women's Championship. It was then announced that Charlotte would defend the title against Banks at TakeOver: R Evolution.

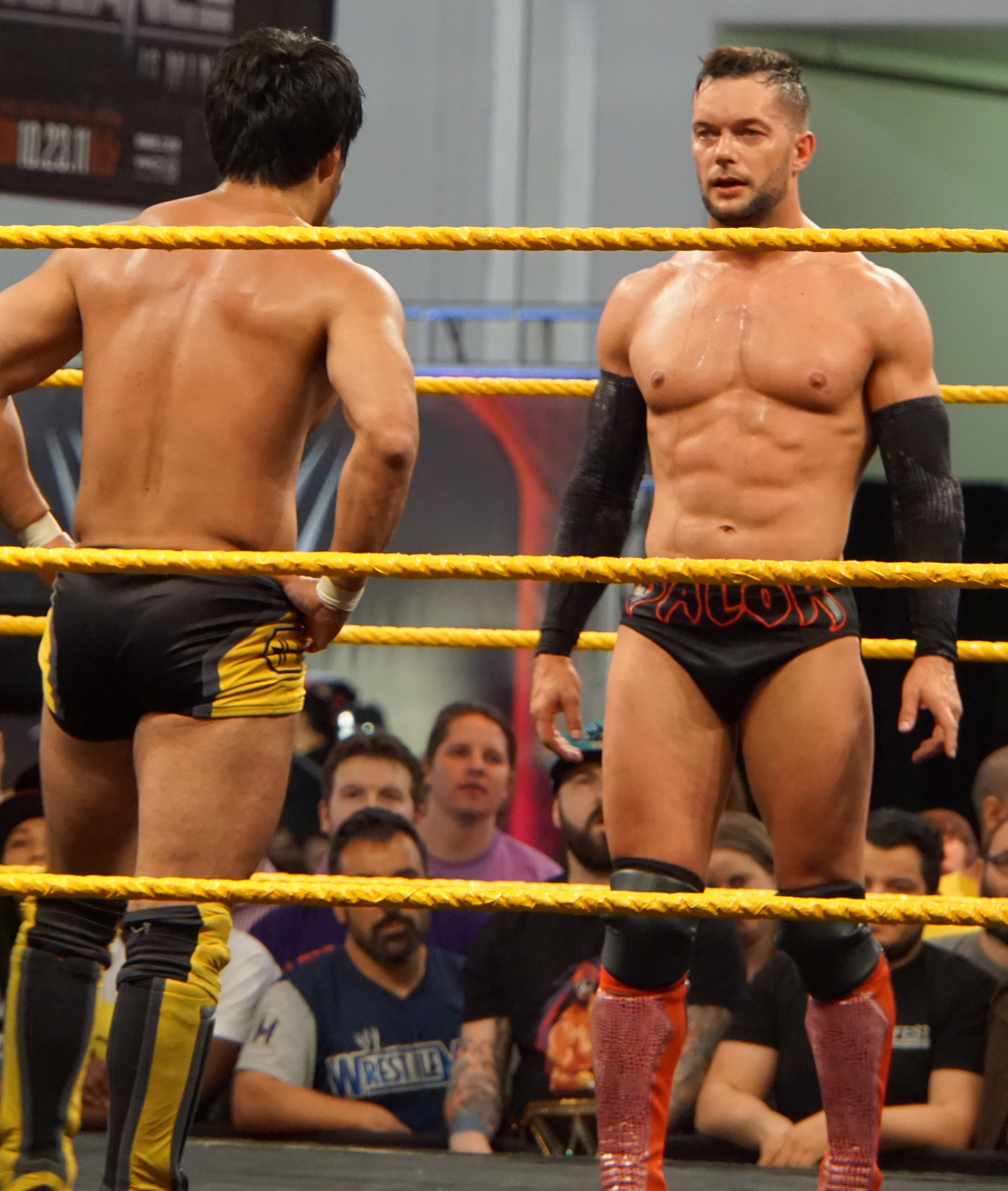
Hideo Itami and Finn Bálor made their first TakeOver appearance at TakeOver: R Evolution

In the summer of 2014, Kenta Kobayashi, better known simply as "Kenta", signed a full-time contract with WWE to go to NXT in preparation for a main roster position at a later date. Kenta made his first NXT appearance on September 11 at TakeOver: Fatal 4-Way, where he was introduced by NXT General manager William Regal. During his introduction, Kenta announced that he would be known as "Hideo Itami" from that point on. Moments later, he was attacked by The Ascension (Konnor and Viktor) who were still angry over losing the NXT Tag Team Championship earlier in the night. Itami made his wrestling debut for NXT during the following day's tapings of NXT. After defeating Justin Gabriel, he was attacked by The Ascension once more, as Konnor and Viktor took advantage of outnumbering Itami. In subsequent weeks, Itami kept fighting against the Ascension, but ended up getting beaten up each week as he was always outnumbered. the storyline was that as a newcomer in NXT, Itami had no friends around to help him. In November 2014, Itami finally introduced his friend, Prince Devitt, who was rechristened "Finn Bálor" as he made his debut to back Itami up. Following Bálor's debut, a match with Itami and Bálor facing the Ascension was announced for TakeOver: R Evolution.

At TakeOver: Fatal 4-Way, the Lucha Dragons (Kalisto and Sin Cara) defeated the Ascension to win the NXT Tag Team Championship, ending their reign as the top tag team after 364 days (recognized as 344 days). The Lucha Dragons successfully retained the championship in a rematch against the Ascension and then moved on to their next challengers, The Vaudevillains (Aiden English and Simon Gotch). The comedic heel duo used several silent movie clips to antagonize the Lucha Dragons as they claimed to be better than two "masked men", portraying themselves as the brave heroes, at least in their minds, as they made a challenge for the tag team championship, which was scheduled for TakeOver: R Evolution.

On August 12, 2014, WWE announced that Kevin Steen had signed with them and was due to report to their developmental system NXT on August 25. He was given the new ring name Kevin Owens, and NXT began airing promotional videos from November 20 to hype his upcoming debut; Owens detailed that he had wrestled for 14 years before making it to WWE, having faced (and formed a friendship with) several current WWE or NXT wrestlers on the independent circuit years ago, but WWE signed them first. Now that he was here, Owens declared that he would fight anyone and everyone, because fighting was the best way he could provide for his family. Soon after, it was announced that Kevin Owens would make his in-ring debut at the next TakeOver event.

== Event ==
The commentators were Rich Brennan, Alex Riley, and Corey Graves. The pre-show panel consisted of Jason Albert, Alex Riley, Renee Young, and additionally Corey Graves, who prior to joining the panel, announced his retirement from the ring due to concussions.

=== Preliminary matches ===
In the first match, Kevin Owens faced CJ Parker. Owens executed a pop-up powerbomb on Parker to win the match.

Next, The Lucha Dragons (Kalisto and Sin Cara) defended the NXT Tag Team Championship against The Vaudevillains (Aiden English and Simon Gotch). Kalisto executed a "Salida Del Sol" on Gotch to retain the titles.

After that, Baron Corbin faced Tye Dillinger. Corbin executed "End of Days" on Dillinger to win the match in 41 seconds.

In the fourth match, The Ascension (Konnor and Viktor) faced Finn Bálor and Hideo Itami. In the end, Bálor performed a "Coup De Grâce" on Viktor whilst Itami performed a diving double foot stomp on Konnor. Balor pinned Viktor to win the match.

In the penultimate match, Charlotte defended the NXT Women's Championship against Sasha Banks. Charlotte executed "Natural Selection" off the top rope on Banks to retain the title.

=== Main event ===
In the main event, Adrian Neville defended the NXT Championship against Sami Zayn. During the match, Zayn performed a "Blue Thunder Bomb" on Neville for a two count. Zayn applied a Koji clutch on Neville, but Neville placed his foot on the bottom rope, forcing Zayn to release the hold. Zayn performed a "Helluva Kick" on Neville, during which the referee was knocked down. In the end, Zayn performed an exploder suplex into the turnbuckles and a second "Helluva Kick" on Neville to win the title.

After the match, the NXT roster appeared to congratulate Zayn as confetti fell from the ceiling. Neville hugged Zayn and raised his hand in a show of respect. After the NXT roster left, Zayn celebrated with his close frenemy Kevin Owens. Suddenly, Owens pushed Zayn down onto the entrance ramp and performed a powerbomb on Zayn onto the ring apron. NXT General Manager William Regal checked on Zayn as the event ended.

== Reception ==
NXT TakeOver: R Evolution received critical acclaim. Larry Csonka of 411Mania felt as though the NXT Tag Team Championship match was disappointing, giving it ** (out of *****), saying "It was fine, but it just lacked something. The NXT tag team division, as a whole, continues to lack overall." Reviewing the match between Finn Balor and Hideo Itami and The Ascension, he claimed that Finn Balor was the standout star of the match, saying "If you know anything about Balor, you know that he can go big time and work with anyone, WWE has something there if they want it." He gave the match ***1/2. Speaking of the NXT Women's Championship match, he said "They worked hard, they put together a good match and they were able to keep the crowd emotionally invested because they are given the proper formula to do so," giving the match ****. Giving high praise to the main event, Csonka stated "This was just an awesome match, from the story going in to the story they told, the pacing and the overall in ring work and yes the ref bumps, this all worked to get the goal, which was Zayn with the title. They told the story; they completed the journey and delivered excellent wrestling. This is a true MOTY (Match of the Year) candidate." He gave the main event ****3/4. He gave the entire event a score of 8.5 out of 10.

== Aftermath ==
On the following episode of NXT, Adrian Neville talked about his match with new NXT Champion Sami Zayn when Kevin Owens interrupted. Owens stated that he only came to get to the top and didn't care about who stood in his way. Later that night, a match between Owens and Neville ended in a double countout. Afterwards, Owens performed an apron powerbomb on Neville. A title rematch between Zayn and Neville was then scheduled for the January 14, 2015, episode, where Zayn retained. After the match, Owens attacked Zayn, signaling his intentions for the title. This eventually led to a title match between Zayn and Owens for TakeOver: Rival.

Also on NXT, Charlotte was scheduled to defend the NXT Women's Championship against Sasha Banks in a rematch on the December 25 episode, where Charlotte again retained. On the January 14, 2015, episode, Banks's team defeated Charlotte's team in a tag team match. The following week, another title match between Charlotte and Banks ended in a disqualification win for Charlotte after she was attacked by Becky Lynch. Bayley then appeared and performed a Bayley-to-Belly suplex on Charlotte. As a result, Charlotte was scheduled to defend the title against Lynch, Bayley, and Banks in a fatal four-way match at TakeOver: Rival.

== Results ==
No.	Results	Stipulations	Times
1	Kevin Owens defeated CJ Parker by pinfall	Singles match	03:14
2	The Lucha Dragons (Kalisto and Sin Cara) (c) defeated The Vaudevillains (Aiden English and Simon Gotch) by pinfall	Tag team match for the NXT Tag Team Championship	06:40
3	Baron Corbin defeated Tye Dillinger by pinfall	Singles match	00:41
4	Finn Bálor and Hideo Itami defeated The Ascension (Konnor and Viktor) by pinfall	Tag team match	11:38
5	Charlotte (c) defeated Sasha Banks by pinfall	Singles match for the NXT Women's Championship	12:12
6	Sami Zayn defeated Adrian Neville (c) by pinfall	Title vs. Career match for the NXT Championship; Had Zayn lost, he would have voluntarily left NXT.	23:18
(c) / – the champion(s) heading into the match
