= NXT TakeOver: Rival =

2015 WWE Network event

- Promotion: WWE
- Brand: NXT
- Date: February 11, 2015
- City: Winter Park, Florida
- Venue: Full Sail University
- Attendance: 400+ (Sold out)

WWE event chronology
← Previous; Royal Rumble	Next → Fastlane

NXT TakeOver chronology
← Previous; R Evolution	Next → Unstoppable

NXT TakeOver: Rival was a 2015 professional wrestling livestreaming event produced by WWE, held exclusively for wrestlers from the promotion's developmental territory, NXT. It was the fourth NXT TakeOver event and took place on Wednesday, February 11, 2015, at NXT's home venue at the time, Full Sail University in Winter Park, Florida. The event aired exclusively on the WWE Network.

The main event of the show saw Kevin Owens defeat Sami Zayn via referee stoppage to win the NXT Championship in a match that played off their shared history prior to signing with WWE. Also on the show, Sasha Banks defeated Becky Lynch, Bayley, and defending champion Charlotte in a fatal four-way match to win the NXT Women's Championship, and Blake and Murphy retained the NXT Tag Team Championship against former champions The Lucha Dragons (Kalisto and Sin Cara) in their rematch. The show also featured the finals of a tournament to determine the number one contender to the NXT Championship, as well as two other matches.

== Production ==
=== Background ===
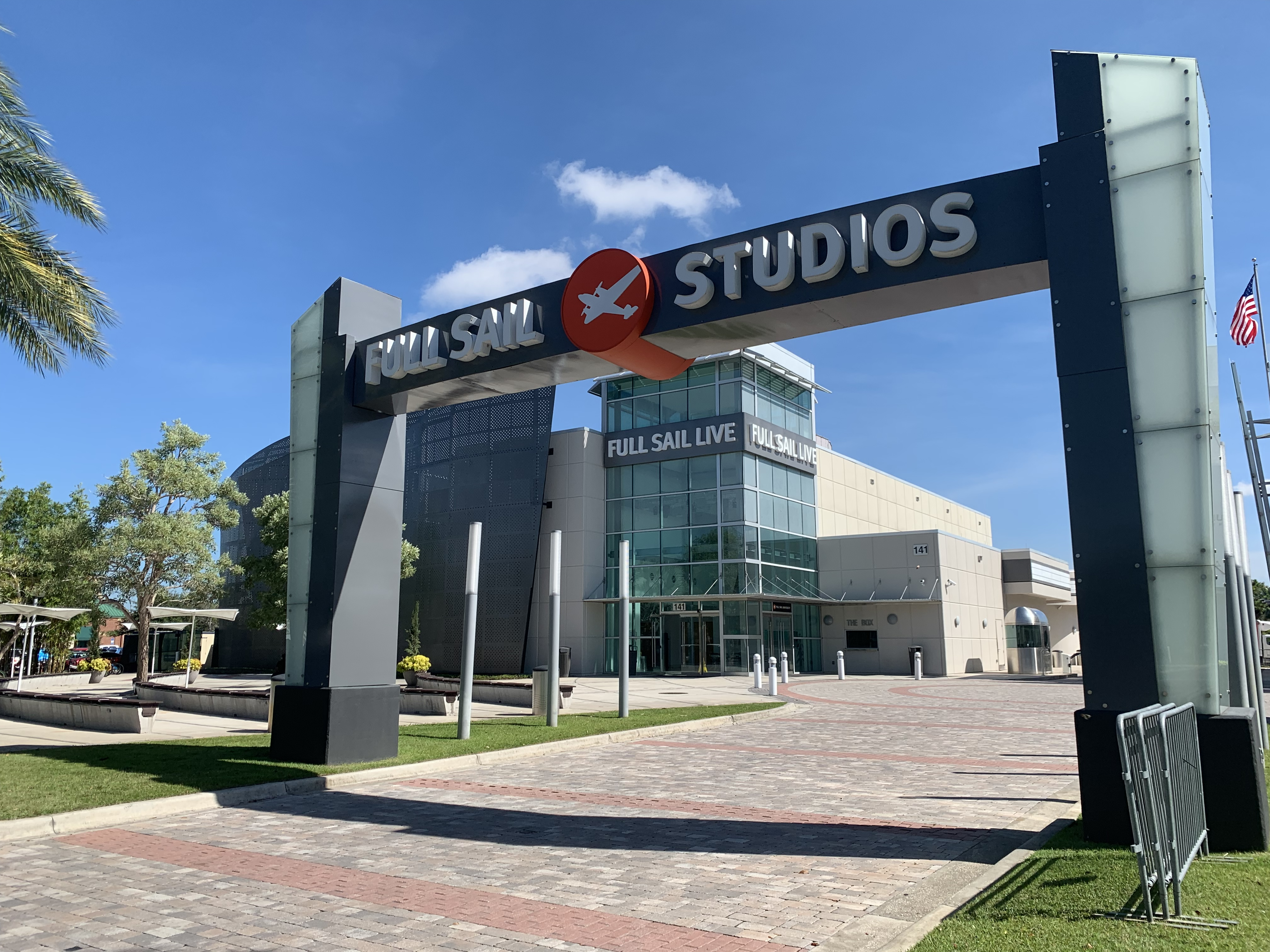
The fourth NXT TakeOver event was held at NXT's home venue at the time, Full Sail University in Winter Park, Florida.

TakeOver was a series of professional wrestling events that began in May 2014, as WWE's developmental territory, NXT, held its second WWE Network-exclusive livestreaming event, billed as TakeOver. The "TakeOver" moniker subsequently became the branding for all of NXT's major events held periodically throughout the year. Rival was scheduled as the fourth TakeOver event and took place on Saturday, February 11, 2015, at NXT's home venue at the time, Full Sail University in Winter Park, Florida.

=== Storylines ===
The card comprised six matches that resulted from scripted storylines. Results were predetermined by WWE's writers on the NXT brand, while storylines were produced on WWE's weekly television program, NXT.

The main event of TakeOver: Rival was a storyline between long time real life friends and often in-ring opponents Sami Zayn and Kevin Owens. The storyline played on the decade long friendship between the two, predating both of them working for WWE, back when they were known as Kevin Steen (Owens) and El Generico (Zayn). The two became friends when they worked for the Canadian promotion, International Wrestling Syndicate (IWS), and later on won several tag team championships as Kevin Steen and El Generico, including the PWG World Tag Team Championship twice and the ROH World Tag Team Championship. While they were close friends, the two also had a very intense storyline feud in Ring of Honor (ROH) that lasted from late 2009 until late 2012 when Zayn signed with WWE. Steen, given the ring name Kevin Owens, signed with WWE during the summer of 2014, joining Zayn in NXT. During the build to Owens's debut at TakeOver: R Evolution they acknowledged the past history of Zayn and Owens, citing their friendship. At R Evolution, Owens won his debut match against CJ Parker and then later on in the night, Zayn defeated Adrian Neville to win the NXT Championship. After the victory, Owens came to the ring to congratulate Zayn on the victory, but then turned on him and attacked Zayn, performing a Powerbomb on Zayn onto the ring apron. On January 14, 2015, Zayn successfully defended the championship against Neville, only to be attacked by Owens after the match once more. At the following NXT show, Zayn demanded a match against Owens, with Owens pushing back saying he was a "prize fighter" and would only fight Zayn if the NXT Championship was on the line, a stipulation Zayn agreed to, and the match was scheduled for TakeOver: Rival.

In the weeks prior to the TakeOver: Rival show, NXT held a tournament to determine the next challenger to the NXT Championship, announcing the tournament before Owens goaded Zayn into giving him a match for the championship. The eight-man tournament included Finn Bálor, Curtis Axel, Hideo Itami, Tyler Breeze, Tyson Kidd, Adrian Neville, Baron Corbin, and Bull Dempsey. The first round of the tournament was broadcast on January 21 and 28 with Bálor, Itami, Neville, and Corbin all advancing to the semi-finals. The semi-finals of the tournament was shown on the WWE Network on February 4 and saw Bálor and Neville qualify for the finals that would take place at TakeOver: Rival.

On January 15, 2015 (shown on January 28), the team of Blake and Murphy upset the reigning NXT Tag Team Champions The Lucha Dragons (Kalisto and Sin Cara) to win the championship. Prior to the victory, the team had only won a few matches since they became a regular tag team six months prior, so the title victory was seen as a surprise. Following the title change, NXT quickly announced a rematch between the two teams for TakeOver: Rival.

== Event ==
=== Preliminary matches ===
The event opened with Hideo Itami facing Tyler Breeze. Itami executed a "Shotgun Kick" on Breeze for the win.

Next, Baron Corbin and Bull Dempsey in a No Disqualification match. Corbin executed the "End of Days" to win the match.

After that, Blake and Murphy defended the NXT Tag Team Championship against The Lucha Dragons (Kalisto and Sin Cara). After Murphy executed a brainbuster on Cara, Blake followed with a "Six Star Frog Splash" for the pinfall to retain the titles.

The next match between Adrian Neville and Finn Bálor was to determine the #1 contender for the NXT Championship. During the match, Bálor performed a running front dropkick on Neville, who was leaning against the guardrail. Balor performed a diving double foot stomp to the back of Neville's head for a near-fall. Neville executed a Phoenix splash off the middle rope for a near-fall. In the end, Bálor performed a running front dropkick on Neville, knocking him into the turnbuckles, followed by a "Coup De Grace" to win the match.

In the penultimate match, Charlotte defended the NXT Women's Championship against Sasha Banks, Bayley and Becky Lynch in a fatal four way match. During the match, Lynch performed an exploder suplex on Charlotte for a near-fall. Bayley performed a "Bayley-to-Belly Suplex" off the top rope on Charlotte, but Banks broke up the pinfall attempt. Banks performed a Banks Statement on Charlotte before altering it into a crucifix and pinned her to win the title.

=== Main event ===
In the main event, Sami Zayn defended the NXT Championship against Kevin Owens. During the match, Zayn performed a "Blue Thunder Bomb" on Owens for a near-fall. After Owens executed a pop-up powerbomb for a near-fall, Zayn appeared to be injured. Medical personnel repeatedly checked on him. After Owens performed another four powerbombs, Owens was declared the winner by technical knockout. As a result, Owens won the NXT Championship.

== Aftermath ==
On the following episode of NXT, Kevin Owens defeated Adrian Neville in a non-title match. Finn Bálor received his title match against Owens on the March 25 episode, but failed to win the title. Owens defended the NXT Championship against Sami Zayn at the following TakeOver, TakeOver: Unstoppable, again the match ended without a pinfall as Owens injured Zayn, attacking him until Samoa Joe made his shocking surprise debut for NXT and stopped Owens from attacking further. Owens would eventually lose the title to Bálor at The Beast in the East.

Also on NXT, Bayley stated in a backstage interview that she was happy that Banks won the NXT Women's Championship and claimed it was her fault Becky Lynch failed to win. Lynch then defeated Bayley the following week. On the March 4 episode, Banks retained the title against Charlotte. On the April 22 episode, Lynch defeated Bayley and Charlotte in a triple threat match to earn a title match against Banks at TakeOver: Unstoppable, where Banks retained. Banks retained the NXT Women's Championship against Charlotte on the July 15 episode of NXT before dropping it to Bayley at TakeOver: Brooklyn.

== Results ==
No.	Results	Stipulations	Times
1	Hideo Itami defeated Tyler Breeze by pinfall	Singles match	8:13
2	Baron Corbin defeated Bull Dempsey by pinfall	No Disqualification match	4:15
3	Blake and Murphy (c) defeated The Lucha Dragons (Kalisto and Sin Cara) by pinfall	Tag team match for the NXT Tag Team Championship	8:10
4	Finn Bálor defeated Adrian Neville by pinfall	Singles match to determine the #1 contender for the NXT Championship	13:25
5	Sasha Banks defeated Charlotte (c), Bayley, and Becky Lynch by pinfall	Fatal four-way match for the NXT Women's Championship	12:28
6	Kevin Owens defeated Sami Zayn (c) by technical knockout	Singles match for the NXT Championship	23:27
(c) / – the champion(s) heading into the match

=== NXT Championship #1 Contender's Tournament bracket ===
1st Round; NXT; January 15, 2015 (Aired: January 21–28)
Finn Bálor	Pinfall
Curtis Axel	4:00
Hideo Itami	Pinfall
Tyler Breeze	11:03
Tyson Kidd	12:50
Adrian Neville	Pinfall
Baron Corbin	Pinfall
Bull Dempsey	1:40

Semifinals; NXT; January 15, 2015 (Aired: February 4)
Finn Bálor	Pinfall
Hideo Itami	12:03
Adrian Neville	Pinfall
Baron Corbin	05:30

Final; NXT TakeOver: Rival; February 11, 2015
Finn Bálor	Pinfall
Adrian Neville	13:25
