= NXT TakeOver: Unstoppable =

2015 WWE Network event

- Promotional poster featuring "The Demon" Finn Bálor
- Promotion: WWE
- Brand: NXT
- Date: May 20, 2015
- City: Winter Park, Florida
- Venue: Full Sail University
- Attendance: 400+ (Sold out)

WWE event chronology
← Previous; Payback	Next → Elimination Chamber

NXT TakeOver chronology
← Previous; Rival	Next → Brooklyn

NXT TakeOver: Unstoppable was a 2015 professional wrestling livestreaming event produced by WWE, held exclusively for wrestlers from the promotion's developmental territory, NXT. It was the fifth NXT TakeOver event and took place on Wednesday, May 20, 2015, at NXT's home venue at the time, Full Sail University in Winter Park, Florida. The event aired exclusively on the WWE Network.

The event featured six matches as part of the televised broadcast and one that was a dark match that occurred prior to the televised portion of the show. The main event saw Kevin Owens defending the NXT Championship against Sami Zayn. The event is notable for the surprise WWE debut of Samoa Joe. The event included five additional matches, including matches for the NXT Women's Championship and the NXT Tag Team Championship.

== Production ==
=== Background ===
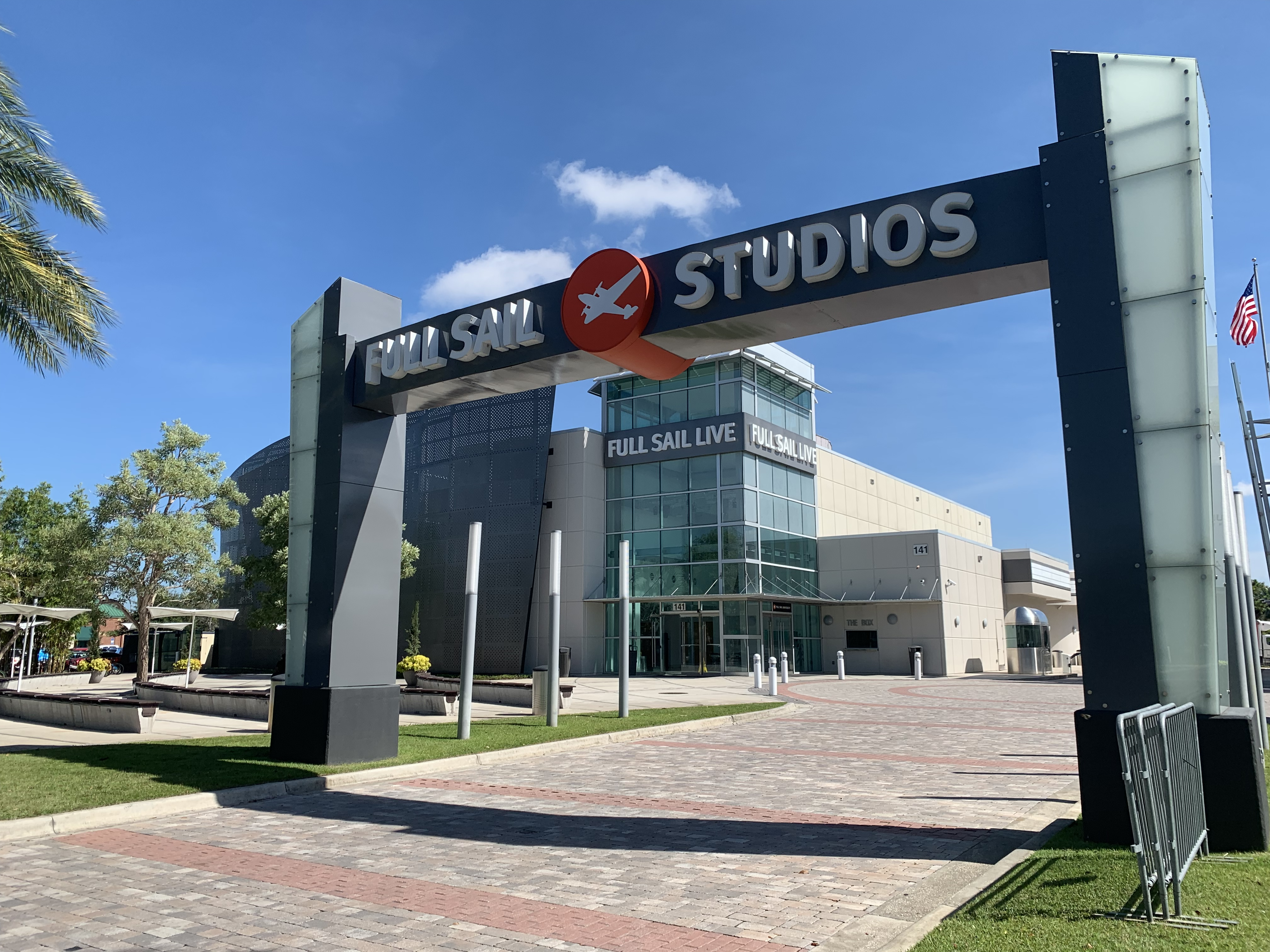
The fifth NXT TakeOver event was held at NXT's home venue at the time, Full Sail University in Winter Park, Florida.

TakeOver was a series of professional wrestling events that began in May 2014, as WWE's developmental territory, NXT, held its second WWE Network-exclusive livestreaming event, billed as TakeOver. The "TakeOver" moniker subsequently became the branding for all of NXT's major events held periodically throughout the year. Unstoppable was scheduled as the fifth TakeOver event and took place on Saturday, May 20, 2015, at NXT's home venue at the time, Full Sail University in Winter Park, Florida.

=== Storylines ===
The card comprised six matches, as well as one dark match before the broadcast, that resulted from scripted storylines. Results were predetermined by WWE's writers on the NXT brand, while storylines were produced on WWE's weekly television program, NXT.

At TakeOver: Rival, Kevin Owens defeated Sami Zayn via referee stoppage to win the NXT Championship. On the April 29 episode of NXT, a title rematch was scheduled for TakeOver: Unstoppable.

At TakeOver: Rival, Sasha Banks defeated Bayley, Becky Lynch, and champion Charlotte in a fatal four-way match to win the NXT Women's Championship. On the April 22 episode of NXT, Lynch defeated Bayley and Charlotte in a triple threat match to become the number one contender for the title, which was subsequently scheduled for TakeOver: Unstoppable.

== Event ==
=== Preliminary matches ===
The event opened with Finn Bálor facing Tyler Breeze to determine who would be the number one contender for the NXT Championship. The match originally also included Hideo Itami, but Itami suffered a shoulder injury and was not able to compete. To explain Itami's absence, WWE aired footage of a (kayfabe) attack on Itami in the parking lot. While never explicitly stated, the footage revealed that Kevin Owens was near by during the attack. During the match, Breeze performed a "Supermodel Kick" on Bálor for a near-fall. After Bálor collided with an exposed turnbuckle, Breeze executed a "Beauty Shot" for a near-fall. In the end, Bálor executed a running front dropkick on Breeze, knocking him into the turnbuckles, and a "Coup de Grâce" to win the match.

Next, Emma and Dana Brooke faced Bayley and Charlotte. In the end, Bayley performed a "Bayley-to-Belly Suplex" on Brooke. Charlotte executed "Natural Selection" on Emma to win the match.

After that, Baron Corbin faced Rhyno. Corbin executed "End of Days" on Rhyno to win the match.

In the fourth match, Blake and Murphy defended their NXT Tag Team Championship against Enzo Amore and Colin Cassady (accompanied by their valet, Carmella). In the end, Alexa Bliss attacked Carmella. As Cass checked on his valet, Murphy attacked him with a superkick. Bliss shook the ring ropes, knocking Amore off the top rope. Blake pinned Enzo to retain the titles.

In the penultimate match, Sasha Banks defended the NXT Women's Championship against Becky Lynch. During the match, Lynch applied the "Dis-arm-her" on Banks but Banks touched the rope, forcing Lynch to release the hold. In the end, Banks forced Lynch to submit to the "Bank Statement" to retain the title.

=== Main event ===
In the main event, Kevin Owens defended the NXT Championship against Sami Zayn. Zayn performed a "Blue Thunder Bomb" on Owens for a near-fall. Zayn executed an exploder suplex into the turnbuckles on Owens and attempted a "Helluva Kick", but Owens rolled out of the ring. Zayn performed an exploder suplex on the floor on Owens. Owens performed a pop-up powerbomb onto the ring apron on Zayn. As Zayn appeared to have injured his shoulder and was unable to compete, the match came to a halt but Owens continued to attack his injured opponent, drawing out NXT General Manager William Regal. Regal raked Owens's face but Owens retaliated with a headbutt. Samoa Joe appeared, making his surprise debut, to stop Owens's attack. After staring at Joe, Owens grabbed the title belt and then walked away as medics tended to Zayn at ringside.

== Aftermath ==
The main event match was the last match for Sami Zayn before having to undergo shoulder surgery to deal with an injury he suffered in the weeks prior to TakeOver. He would not return until December. With his victory Finn Bálor earned a match against champion Kevin Owens in one of the main matches of The Beast in the East, a WWE Network special on July 4, 2015. Bálor defeated Owens to become the seventh NXT Champion. He later successfully defended the championship against Owens at NXT TakeOver: Brooklyn and went on to hold the title for 292 days, becoming the second longest-reigning NXT champion.

After her successful defense of the NXT Women's Championship, Sasha Banks made her Raw debut on July 13, while still the NXT Women's Champion. In NXT, Bayley returned from a hand injury and stated that she wanted a title match against Sasha Banks. Bayley then challenged and defeated Charlotte on the August 5 episode of NXT. On the August 12 episode of NXT, Bayley defeated Becky Lynch to earn the title match at NXT TakeOver: Brooklyn. On August 22, Bayley defeated Banks to win the NXT Women's Championship.

== Results ==
No.	Results	Stipulations	Times
1^{D}	The Mechanics (Dash Wilder and Scott Dawson) defeated The Vaudevillains (Aiden English and Simon Gotch) by pinfall	Tag team match	—
2	Finn Bálor defeated Tyler Breeze by pinfall	Singles match to determine the #1 contender for the NXT Championship (Note: The scheduled third participant in this match, Hideo Itami, was ruled out due to injury.)	11:30
3	Bayley and Charlotte defeated Dana Brooke and Emma by pinfall	Tag team match	6:51
4	Baron Corbin defeated Rhyno by pinfall	Singles match	7:15
5	Blake and Murphy (c) defeated Colin Cassady and Enzo Amore (with Carmella) by pinfall	Tag team match for the NXT Tag Team Championship	8:50
6	Sasha Banks (c) defeated Becky Lynch by submission	Singles match for the NXT Women's Championship	15:33
7	Kevin Owens (c) vs. Sami Zayn ended in a no contest	Singles match for the NXT Championship	13:00
(c) / – the champion(s) heading into the match; D / – this was a dark match
