= Enzo and Cass =

Professional wrestling tag team

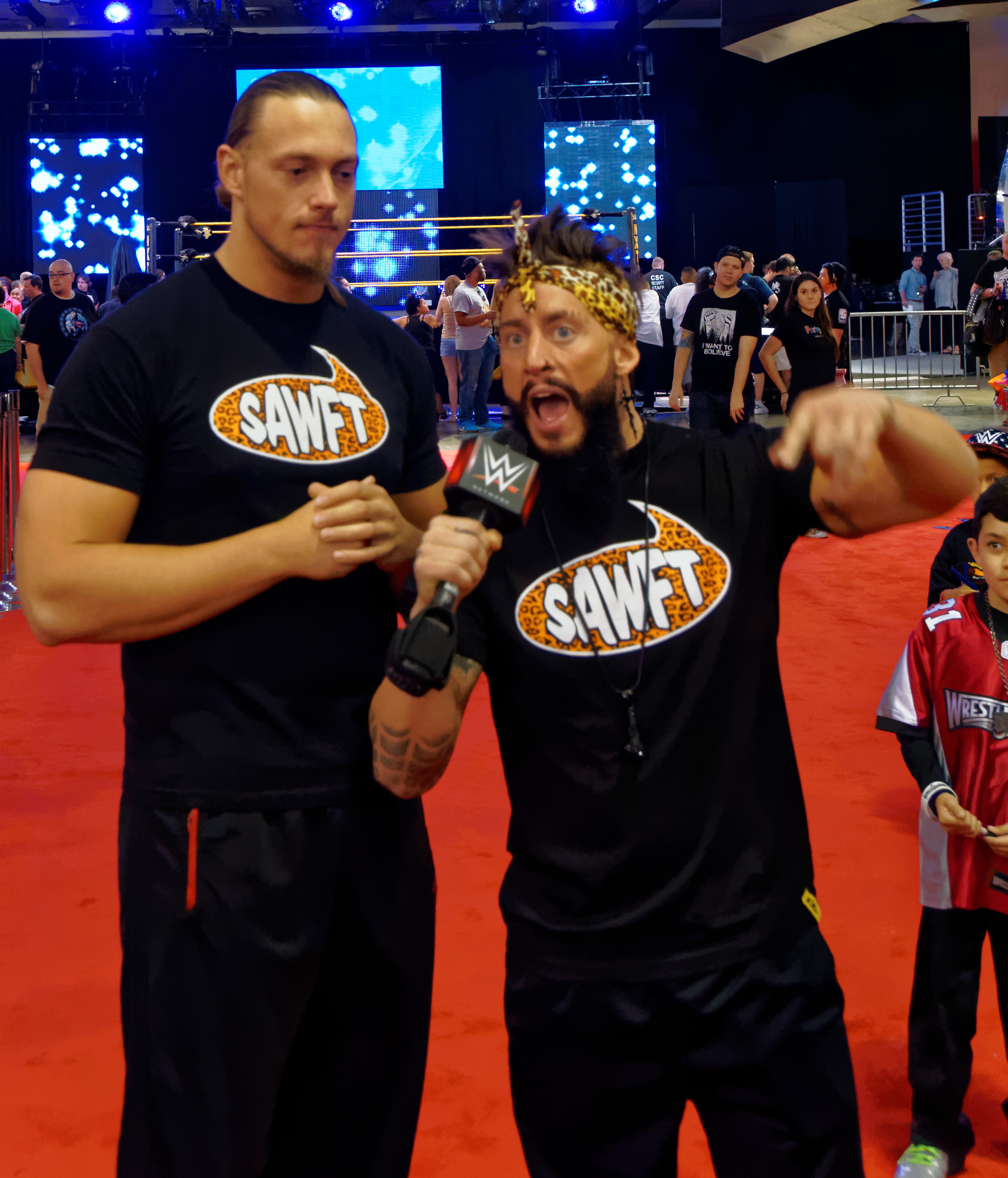
- Enzo (right) and Cass (left) in 2015

Tag team
- Members: Enzo Amore / nZo; Colin Cassady / Big Cass / CaZXL; Carmella (manager)
- Name(s): Enzo and Cass; Enzo Amore and Big Cass; Enzo Amore and Colin Cassady; FreeAgentZ
- Billed heights: Enzo: 5 ft 11 in (1.80 m); Cass: 7 ft 0 in (2.13 m)
- Combined billed weight: 476 lb (216 kg)
- Debut: June 6, 2013
- Disbanded: February 3, 2025
- Years active: 2013–2017; 2019–2025

Enzo and Cass were a professional wrestling tag team consisting of Enzo Amore and Big Cass. They are best known for their tenure in WWE from 2013 to 2017. After their separate departures from the WWE, they briefly reunited on the independent circuit.

== History ==
=== Early years ===
Eric Arndt (Enzo) and William Morrissey (Cass) first met each other whilst in their mid-teens during a game of basketball at The Cage in Manhattan, New York, nearly ten years before reuniting in WWE's developmental territory NXT, in July 2013.

=== WWE ===
==== NXT (2013–2016) ====
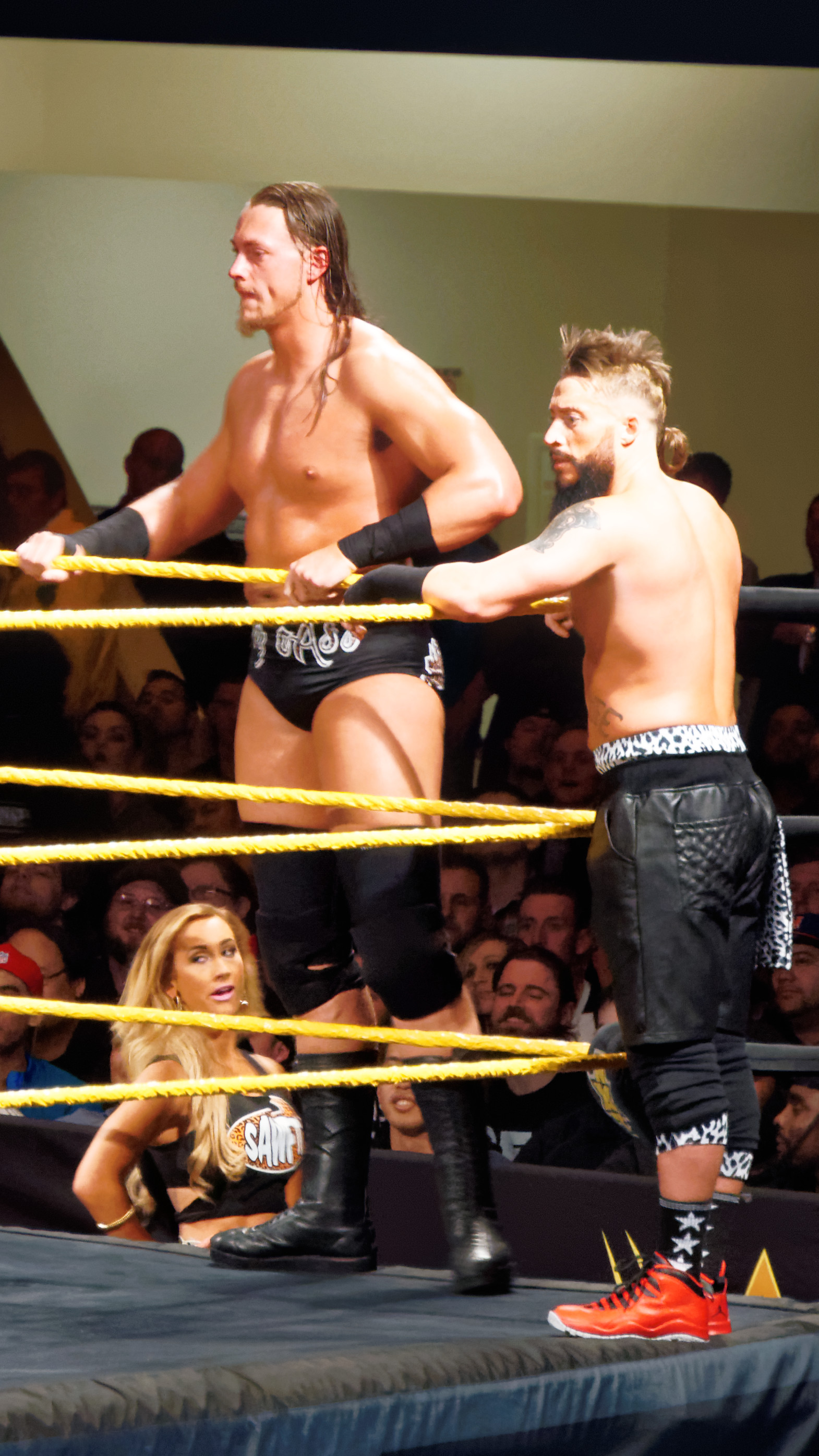
Amore and Cassady being managed by Carmella in March 2015

On May 22, 2013, Enzo Amore debuted on NXT television, where he was quickly defeated by Mason Ryan. Colin Cassady debuted on NXT television on June 5, with a loss to Mason Ryan. On the July 3 episode of NXT, Amore and Cassady went on to form an alliance, and they labelled themselves "the realest guys in the room". Despite Amore and Cassady's alliance, Ryan easily defeated them in consecutive singles matches in July, but lost to them in a handicap match. After the feud with Ryan, Amore and Cassady went on to feud with Alexander Rusev, Scott Dawson and their manager Sylvester Lefort, turning face in the process. On the September 25 episode of NXT, Amore and Cassady participated in a gauntlet match for a future shot at the NXT Tag Team Championship; they started the match, first defeating CJ Parker and Tyler Breeze, then beating Rusev and Dawson, but fell to their final opponents, The Ascension (Konnor and Viktor). In November 2013, Amore suffered a broken leg while training, which led Cassady to try his hand at singles competition.

Amore returned on June 26, 2014 episode of NXT, saving Cassady from an attack from Sylvester Lefort and Marcus Louis. In early August, Amore and Cassady participated in the NXT Tag Team Championship tournament. They defeated Jason Jordan and Tye Dillinger in the first round but were eliminated by The Vaudevillains (Aiden English and Simon Gotch) in the second round. Lefort and Louis then renewed their rivalry with Amore and Cassady by attacking them and shaving Amore's beard. As a result, Amore challenged Lefort to a match with the loser's hair as forfeit at NXT TakeOver: Fatal 4-Way. Amore proceeded to win the match but Lefort ran away, leaving his partner, Louis, to lose his hair and eyebrows at the hands of Amore and Cassady. Amore and Cassady then formed an alliance with the debuting Carmella. The duo had accidentally cost Carmella her hairdressing job as per the storyline, causing her to demand to get a job as a professional wrestler. Carmella had her televised in-ring debut on the October 16, 2014 episode of NXT. On the March 11, 2015 episode of NXT, Amore and Cassady defeated The Lucha Dragons to become the number one contenders for the NXT Tag Team Championship. At NXT TakeOver: Unstoppable, Amore and Cassady faced Blake and Murphy for the title in a losing effort after interference from Alexa Bliss. In December, Amore and Cassady began a feud with Dash and Dawson, where they challenged them for the NXT Tag Team Championship at both NXT TakeOver: London and Roadblock unsuccessfully. On the April 20 episode of NXT, the two took on the newly crowned NXT Tag Team Champions American Alpha, in a friendly non-title bout where they failed to defeat them, this was Amore and Cassady's last appearance in NXT.

==== Main roster (2016–2017) ====
On the Raw after WrestleMania 32, Amore and Cassady debuted on the main roster and confronted The Dudley Boyz. A week later on SmackDown, Amore and Cassady defeated The Ascension in their main roster debut, in a tournament to determine the number one contenders for the WWE Tag Team Championship. The team went on to defeat The Dudley Boyz on the following week's Raw in the semi-final of the tag team tournament, advancing them to the finals. In the finals, they faced The Vaudevillains at Payback, with the match ending in a no contest after Amore suffered a legitimate concussion during the match. Around this time, Cassady's ring name changed to his former nickname, Big Cass. At the Money in the Bank pay-per-view, Enzo and Cass faced The New Day, The Vaudevillains and Luke Gallows and Karl Anderson, in a fatal-four way tag team match for the WWE Tag Team Championship, but The New Day retained their titles. On the July 4 edition of Raw, Enzo and Cass helped John Cena, who was getting attacked by The Club, involving themselves in the feud between Cena and The Club. As a result, Enzo and Cass teamed with Cena to face The Club in a six-man tag team match at Battleground, which they won.

On July 19 at the 2016 WWE draft, Enzo and Cass were drafted to Raw brand. Following Battleground, Enzo and Cass proceeded to feud with Chris Jericho and Kevin Owens. The feud culminated at SummerSlam in a tag team match, which would ultimately be won by Jericho and Owens. On the August 22 episode of Raw, Cass, managed by Amore, defeated Rusev by count-out to qualify for a fatal-four way elimination match for the vacant Universal Championship. The next week on Raw, Cass faced Seth Rollins, Roman Reigns and Kevin Owens for the title, where he was the first man eliminated. On the November 7 episode of Raw, Enzo and Cass were announced as part of Team Raw for the 10–on–10 Survivor Series Tag Team Elimination match at Survivor Series, in which their team won. On the November 21 episode of Raw, after Amore was locked out of the locker room naked by Cass as a practical joke and ran into Lana in the hallway, her husband Rusev challenged Amore to a match later that night, in which Amore was quickly defeated. On the December 5 episode of Raw, after Amore stood up for Lana after seeing her and Rusev argue backstage, Lana invited Amore to her hotel room. Later that night, this was revealed to be a trap when Rusev attacked Amore in the hotel room. Over the following weeks, Enzo and Cass feuded with Rusev and Jinder Mahal. Cass lost a handicap match against Rusev and Jinder Mahal before teaming up with Amore to defeat the duo twice, ending the feud.

On the February 20, 2017 episode of Raw, they would become the number one contenders for the Raw Tag Team Championship by defeating Cesaro and Sheamus. At Fastlane, they failed to capture the titles from Luke Gallows and Karl Anderson. On April 2 at WrestleMania 33, Enzo and Cass participated in a fatal-four way ladder match for the Raw Tag Team Championship against defending champions Luke Gallows and Karl Anderson, Cesaro and Sheamus, and the returning Hardy Boyz, where The Hardy Boyz emerged victorious. The following night on Raw, Amore and Cass were defeated by Cesaro and Sheamus in a tag team match to determinate the number one contenders for the Raw Tag Team Championship.

==== Split and feud (2017) ====
On the May 22 episode of Raw, when Amore was attacked, Cass would tell the General Manager Kurt Angle to find the attacker before he does. The next week, Cass would accuse Corey Graves, then The Revival as Amore's attackers. On the June 5 episode of Raw, Cass was mysteriously attacked in the same manner as Amore and blamed his attack on Big Show, but Show denied this allegation. On the June 19 episode of Raw, it was revealed by Corey Graves that Cass was behind the attacks on Amore and that he faked his own attack in order to lure away suspicion that he was the attacker. Cass stated his frustration during his time teaming with Amore by accusing him of holding him down, calling him "dead weight". Cass then delivered a big boot to Amore, thus turning heel and disbanding the team. The following week on Raw, Amore called out Cass in order to make up and leave the attacks in the past. Cass would supposedly accept Amore's speech, but then attack him when they went up the entrance ramp. On July 9, Cass defeated Amore at Great Balls of Fire event.

They continued to feud for the duration of the summer, with Amore eventually befriending Big Show. Show and Cass' ensuing series of altercations culminated in a match at SummerSlam with Amore locked inside a shark cage which hung over the ring. Although Amore escaped the cage, he was easily taken out by Cass, who would go on to defeat Big Show. On the August 21 episode of Raw, Cass faced Amore in a Street Fight, which Amore won by referee stoppage after Cass suffered a legitimate knee injury.

In 2018, Arndt and Morrissey were released at separate times from WWE. Arndt was fired by WWE on January 23 while Morrissey was released on June 19. Arndt pursued a rap music career under the moniker "Real1" and later "nZo", whilst Morrissey worked limited independent wrestling bookings.

=== Sporadic reunions (2019–2025) ===
Arndt and Morrissey reunited on April 6, 2019, at the G1 Supercard show. Following a tag team match involving Ring of Honor (ROH) and New Japan Pro-Wrestling (NJPW) talent, the two jumped the barricade and attacked several wrestlers. The broadcast cameras cut away from the incident to indicate a legit outside attack, but it was later reported the angle was a worked shoot. Soon thereafter, the pair gave an interview with Sports Illustrated announcing that they had reformed as a tag team - now known as FreeAgentZ (nZo and CaZXL). However, CaZXL took a hiatus from wrestling from September 2019 until February 2021, when he returned at a Lariato Pro Wrestling event and reunited with nZo. On March 27, 2022, at the NEW The Return Of The Hardys event, FreeAgentZ lost to The Hardys.

On February 3, 2025, Arndt and Morrissey, now respectively billed as Real1 and Big Bill, reunited at Chris Jericho's Rock N Wrestling Rager at Sea event, teaming with Jericho and Bryan Keith to defeat Grizzled Young Veterans (James Drake and Zack Gibson) and MxM Collection (Mason Madden and Mansoor).

== Other media ==
They are playable characters in the video games WWE 2K16, WWE 2K17, and WWE 2K18.

== Championships and accomplishments ==
- Pro Wrestling Illustrated
  - Ranked Big Cass No. 120 of the top 500 singles wrestlers in the PWI 500 in 2016
  - Ranked Enzo Amore No. 122 of the top 500 singles wrestlers in the PWI 500 in 2016
- Rolling Stone
  - Ranked No. 10 of the 10 best WWE wrestlers of 2016
- WWE
  - NXT Year-End Award (1 time)
    - Tag Team of the Year (2015)
