= Lucha Dragons =

Professional wrestling tag team

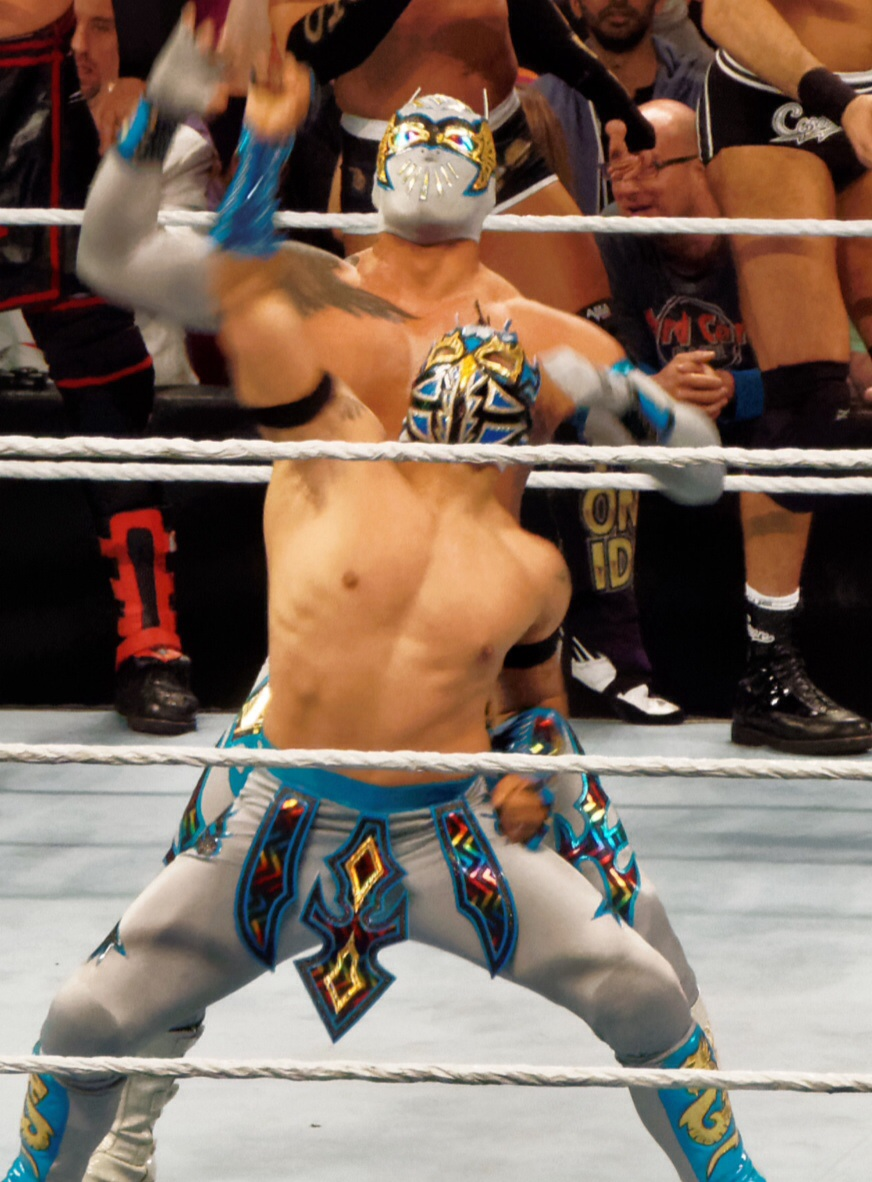
- Kalisto (front) and Sin Cara (back) in March 2015

Tag team
- Members: Kalisto; Sin Cara
- Name: Lucha Dragons
- Billed heights: Kalisto: 5 ft 6 in (1.68 m); Sin Cara: 5 ft 10 in (1.78 m)
- Combined billed weight: 368 lb (167 kg)
- Billed from: Mexico City
- Debut: July 24, 2014
- Disbanded: July 19, 2016
- Years active: 2014–2016

The Lucha Dragons were a professional wrestling tag team composed of Kalisto and Sin Cara. They previously wrestled in WWE's developmental territory NXT, where they were one-time NXT Tag Team Champions. Their name is a reference to their lucha libre style of wrestling. They won the NXT Tag Team Championship after defeating then champions The Ascension on September 11, 2014, at NXT TakeOver: Fatal 4-Way.

== History ==
=== NXT Tag Team Champions (2014–2016) ===
Jorge Arias reprised his Sin Cara character towards the end of 2013. After a brief winning streak, as 2014 progressed, Sin Cara was unsuccessful in winning four battle royals: the André the Giant Memorial Battle Royal at WrestleMania XXX, a battle royal for the United States Championship in May, a Money in the Bank qualifying battle royal in June, and a battle royal for the Intercontinental Championship at Battleground.

Meanwhile, on the July 24 episode of NXT, after failing to win the NXT Tag Team Championship from The Ascension (Konnor and Viktor) with his former partner El Local at NXT TakeOver on May 29, Kalisto announced he and El Local had parted ways and revealed Sin Cara as his new partner.

Over the next weeks, Kalisto and Sin Cara won a tournament to become the number one contenders to the NXT Tag Team Championship. On September 11 at NXT TakeOver: Fatal 4-Way, Kalisto and Sin Cara, now billed together as "The Lucha Dragons", defeated The Ascension to become the new NXT Tag Team Champions, their first WWE professional wrestling championship. They successfully defended their titles in a rematch against The Ascension two weeks later on the September 25 episode of NXT.

They then began a rivalry with The Vaudevillains (Aiden English and Simon Gotch), which culminated in a title match at NXT TakeOver: R Evolution in which The Lucha Dragons retained. The Lucha Dragons lost the championship to Buddy Murphy and Wesley Blake on the January 15, 2015 episode of NXT. They then lost a rematch to Blake and Murphy at NXT TakeOver: Rival. The duo then began to appear less frequently on NXT, losing a number one contenders tag-team match to Enzo Amore and Colin Cassady on the March 11 episode. During this period, they also began to appear off-and-on on WWE's main roster show Main Event, winning matches against the likes of Curtis Axel and Heath Slater. The Lucha Dragons made their return to NXT for the Dusty Rhodes Tag Team Classic, but lost to Finn Bálor and Samoa Joe in the first round.

=== WWE Tag Team Championship pursuits (2015–2016) ===
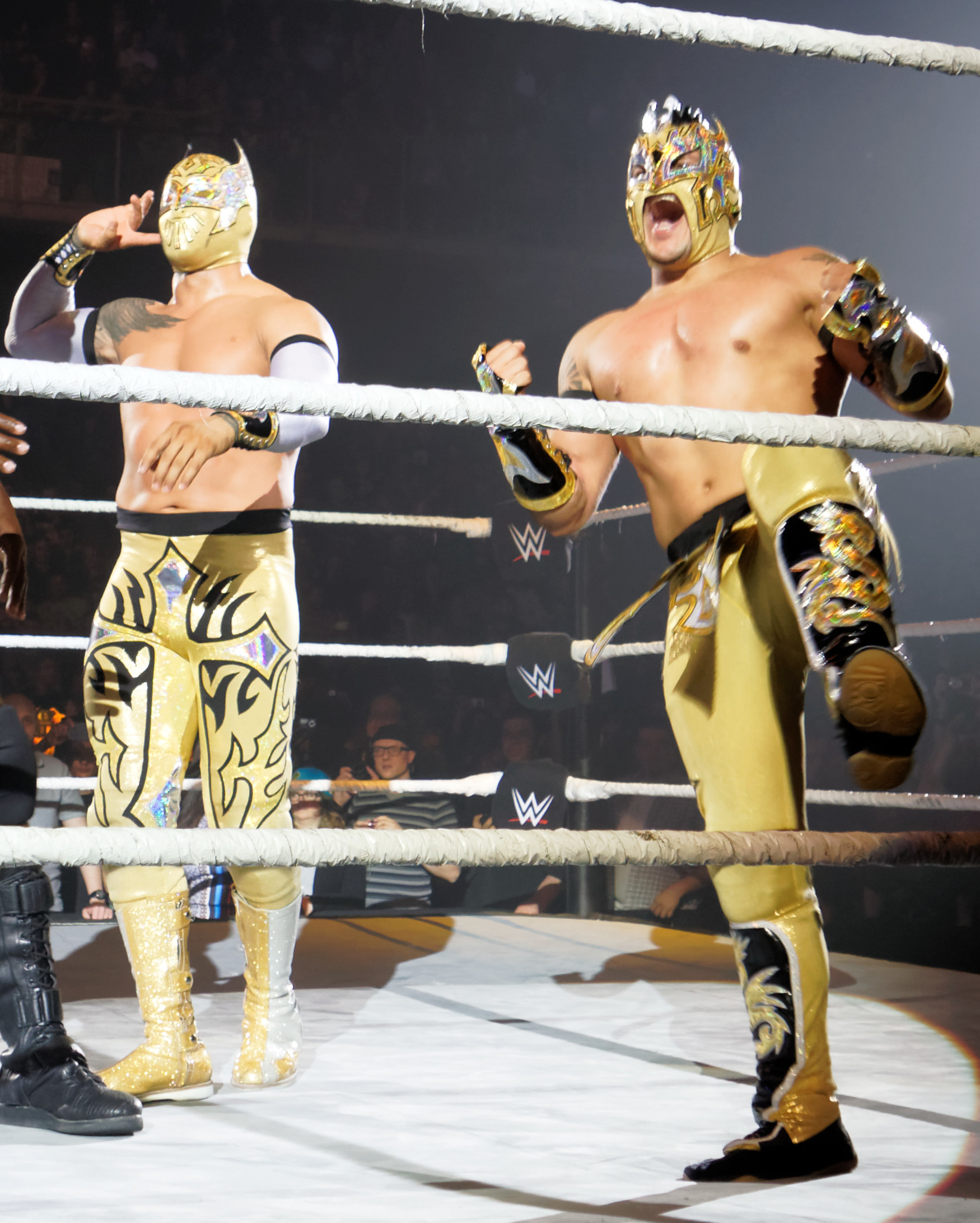

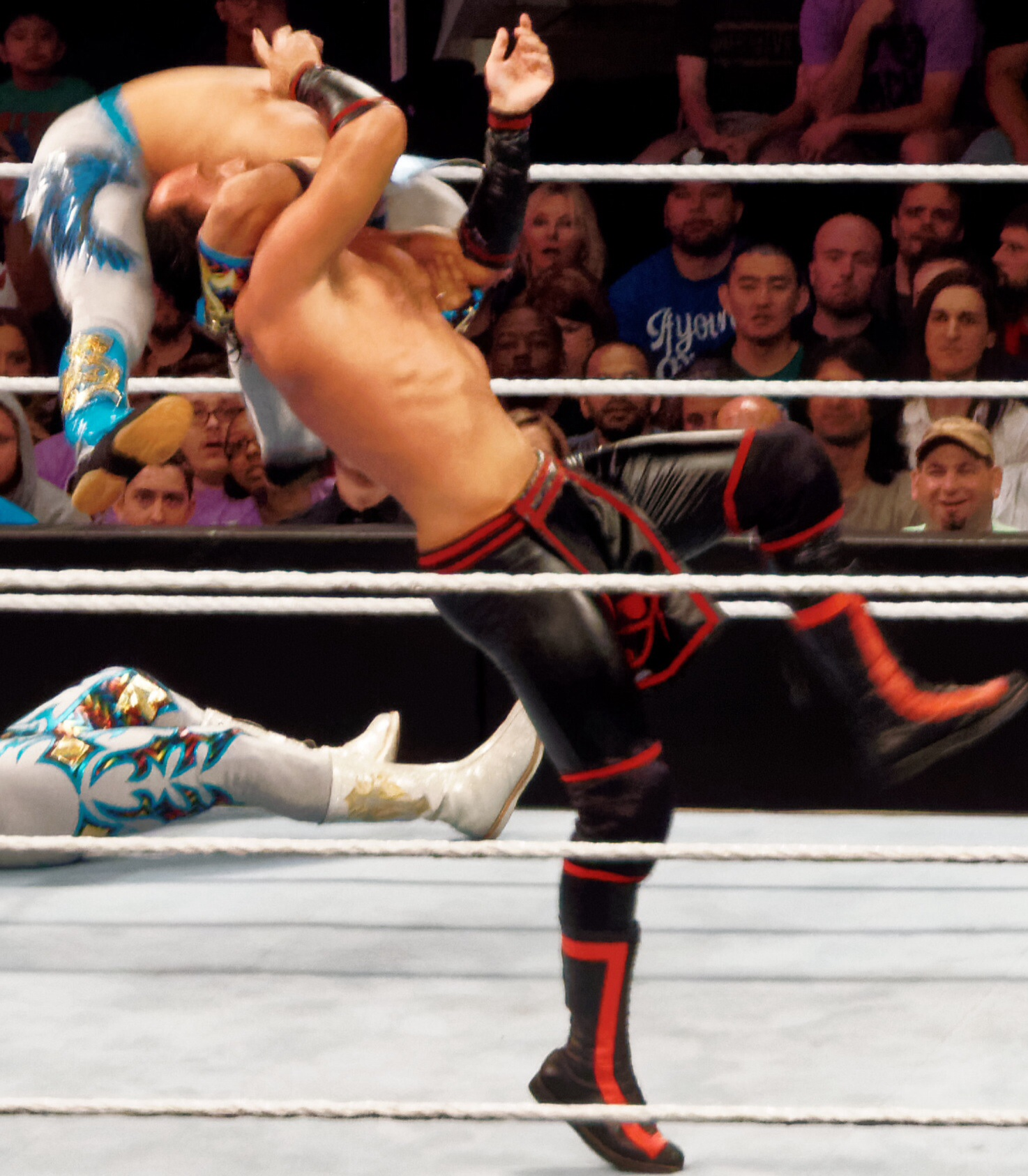
Kalisto performing the Salida del Sol on Viktor

The Lucha Dragons made their official main roster debut on the March 30, 2015 episode of Raw, the night after WrestleMania 31, in which they teamed with The New Day to defeat the team of The Ascension, Cesaro and Tyson Kidd in an eight-man tag team match, with Kalisto scoring the pinfall. On May 31, at Elimination Chamber, The Lucha Dragons competed in the first-ever tag team Elimination Chamber match for the WWE Tag Team Championship, but failed to win. The Lucha Dragons received another title shot on August 23 at SummerSlam in a fatal four-way tag team match, but were once again unsuccessful.

In November, after Seth Rollins vacated the WWE World Heavyweight Championship due to a legitimate injury, WWE held a tournament to determine a new champion and Kalisto started to wrestle in the singles competition as well. After defeating Ryback in his first round match on the November 12 episode of SmackDown, Kalisto was eliminated in the quarterfinals on the November 16 episode of Raw by Alberto Del Rio. At Survivor Series on November 22, The Lucha Dragons teamed up with The Usos (Jimmy and Jey Uso) and Ryback in a five-on-five elimination tag team match against The New Day (Big E, Kofi Kingston and Xavier Woods) and Sheamus and King Barrett in a winning effort. On December 13, at TLC: Tables, Ladders and Chairs, The Lucha Dragons received another shot at the WWE Tag Team Championship, but were defeated by The New Day in a triple threat ladder match, which also included The Usos. The Lucha Dragons once again failed to win the WWE Tag Team Championship on the December 22 episode of Super SmackDown Live!, where they were defeated by The New Day.

After Sin Cara had been sidelined with a shoulder injury in late December 2015, Kalisto defeated United States Champion Alberto Del Rio in a non-title match with John Cena in his corner on the January 7, 2016 episode of SmackDown. On the January 11 episode of Raw, Kalisto defeated Del Rio to win the United States Championship, his first championship on the main roster and his first singles title in WWE. He dropped the title back to Del Rio on the January 14 episode of SmackDown, but won it back at Royal Rumble. On the Fastlane pre-show, Kalisto defeated Del Rio in a two-out-of-three falls match to retain the title. Kalisto defeated Ryback to defend his United States Championship at the WrestleMania 32 pre-show, whereas Sin Cara competed in a seven-man ladder match for the Intercontinental Championship at the time held by Kevin Owens. On the April 11 episode of Raw, The Lucha Dragons entered a tournament to determine the #1 contenders to the WWE Tag Team Championship, but were eliminated in the first round by The Dudley Boyz. Kalisto then rekindled his rivalry with Ryback, and eventually defeated him once again on May 1 at the Payback pre-show to retain the title. On May 22 at Extreme Rules, Kalisto lost the title to Rusev and failed to regain the title in a rematch against Rusev on the May 26 episode of SmackDown. On the Money in the Bank pre-show, The Lucha Dragons defeated The Dudley Boyz. On July 19, Kalisto and Sin Cara announced that they mutually disbanded as a tag team and would enter the 2016 WWE draft as singles competitors.

== Championships and accomplishments ==
- Pro Wrestling Illustrated
  - PWI ranked Cara #100 of the 500 best singles wrestlers in the PWI 500 in 2015
  - PWI ranked Kalisto #120 of the 500 best singles wrestlers in the PWI 500 in 2015
- WWE
  - NXT Tag Team Championship (1 time)
  - WWE United States Championship (2 times) – Kalisto
  - Slammy Award for the "OMG!" Shocking Moment of the Year (2015) – Kalisto
  - NXT Tag Team Championship #1 Contender's Tournament (2014)

== See also ==
- Lucha House Party
