= XWA =

XWA may refer to:

- XWA / 9AM, call letters previously assigned to a Montreal radio facility later renamed CINW
- XWA, IATA code of Williston Basin International Airport
- XWA (professional wrestling), British professional wrestling promotion
  - XWA Frontier Sports Championship, a professional wrestling championship contested for in the XWA
- X-Wing Alliance, a computer or video game
