= Payback (2016) =

WWE pay-per-view and livestreaming event

- Promotional poster featuring The Wyatt Family (Bray Wyatt, Erick Rowan, Luke Harper, and Braun Strowman)
- Promotion: WWE
- Date: May 1, 2016
- City: Rosemont, Illinois
- Venue: Allstate Arena
- Attendance: 13,250
- Tagline: "The first pay-per-view of a New Era"

WWE event chronology
| ← Previous; WrestleMania 32 | Next → Extreme Rules |

Payback chronology
| ← Previous; 2015 | Next → 2017 |

The 2016 Payback was a professional wrestling pay-per-view (PPV) and livestreaming event produced by WWE. It was the fourth annual Payback and took place on May 1, 2016, at the Allstate Arena in the Chicago suburb of Rosemont, Illinois. The event is considered by WWE to be the first PPV and livestreaming event of The New Era. The concept of the event was based around wrestlers seeking payback against their opponents.

Eight matches were contested at the event, including two on the Kickoff pre-show. In the main event, Roman Reigns defeated AJ Styles to retain the WWE World Heavyweight Championship. In other prominent matches, Dean Ambrose defeated Chris Jericho, The Miz defeated Cesaro to retain the Intercontinental Championship, and in the opening bout, the tournament final to determine the number one contenders for the WWE Tag Team Championship, which was contested between Enzo Amore and Colin Cassidy and The Vaudevillains (Aiden English and Simon Gotch), ended in a no contest.

The event was originally scheduled to be held on May 22, 2016, at the Prudential Center in Newark, New Jersey, but WWE switched its date and venue with that year's Extreme Rules, in turn marking the third Payback held at the Allstate Arena, after the first two events in 2013 and 2014. This was the last Payback to take place before the reintroduction of the brand extension in July.

Critics gave mixed reactions to the event, criticizing WWE for promoting the event as the start of a "new era" while employing several storylines they had been using since the Attitude Era. Special criticism was reserved for a re-enactment of the Montreal Screwjob at the end of the WWE Women's Championship match. This event also featured Ryback's final appearance in the company as he was released in August 2016.

== Production ==
=== Background ===
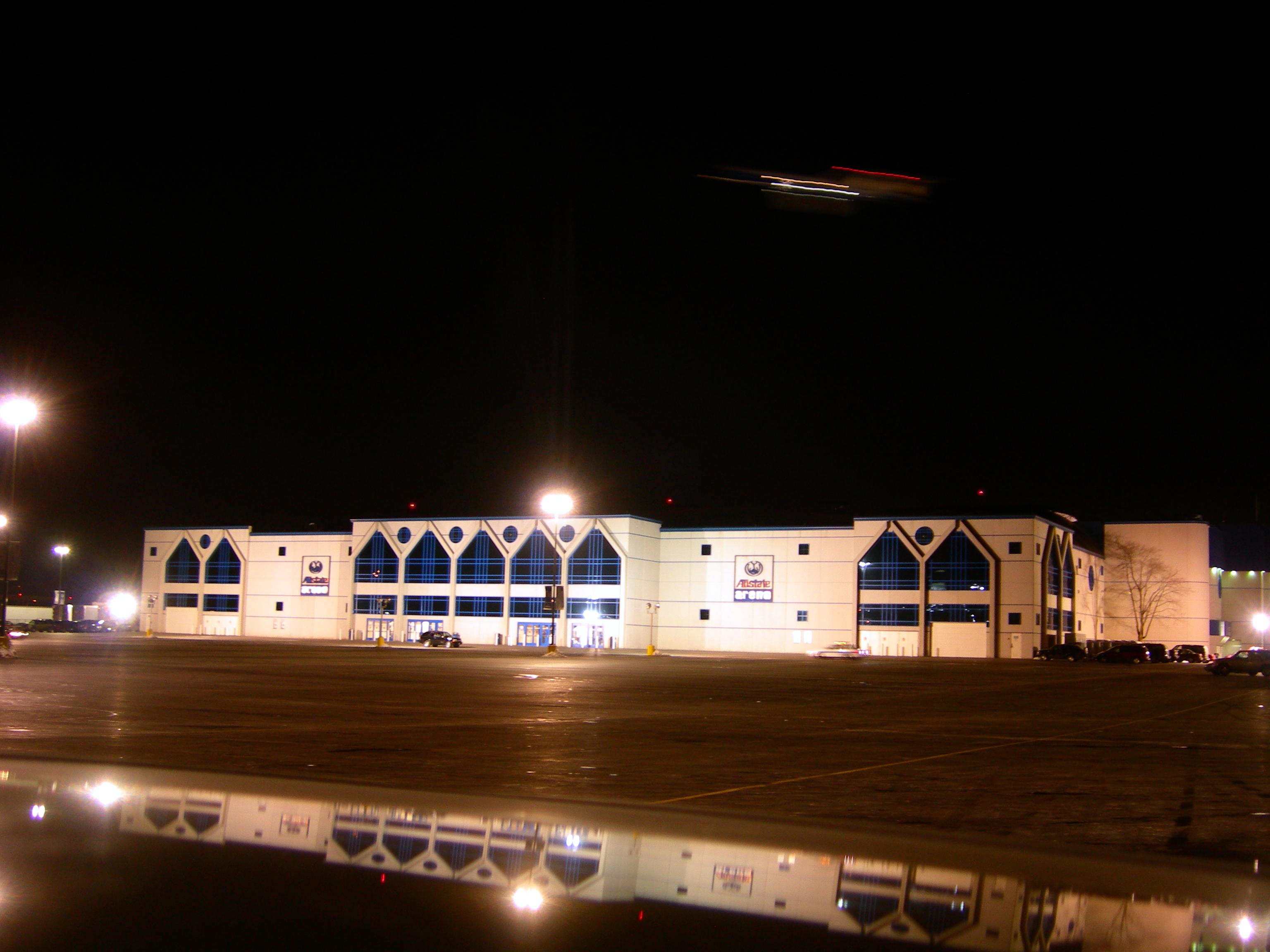
The fourth annual Payback was the third time for the event to be held at the Allstate Arena in the Chicago suburb of Rosemont, Illinois, after 2013 and 2014.

Payback was an annual professional wrestling event that was established by WWE in 2013. It was originally broadcast exclusively via pay-per-view (PPV) before it began simultaneously livestreaming on the WWE Network in 2014. The concept of the event was based around wrestlers seeking payback against their opponents. The fourth event was originally scheduled to be held on May 22, 2016, at the Prudential Center in Newark, New Jersey; however, on February 23, WWE announced that it switched its date and venue with that year's Extreme Rules. As such, Payback was instead held on May 1, 2016, returning the event to the Allstate Arena in the Chicago suburb of Rosemont, Illinois, the same venue as the first two events in 2013 and 2014. This edition was promoted as the first PPV and livestreaming event of The New Era for WWE.

=== Storylines ===
The event comprised eight matches, including two on the Kickoff pre-show, that resulted from scripted storylines. Results were predetermined by WWE's writers, while storylines were produced on WWE's weekly television shows, Raw and SmackDown.

At WrestleMania 32, Roman Reigns defeated Triple H to win the WWE World Heavyweight Championship for the third time. The following night on Raw, Reigns issued an open challenge for the championship, which was answered by Chris Jericho, AJ Styles, Kevin Owens, and Sami Zayn. This set up a fatal four-way match to determine the number one contender for the title later in the show, but Owens attacked Zayn, rendering him unable to compete in the match; he was replaced by a returning Cesaro. Styles won the match, earning a title match against Reigns at Payback. The following week, Zayn, after being unable to compete the previous week, faced Styles in a match set up by Shane McMahon where he would gain entry into the title match if he won, but Styles was victorious. On the April 25 episode of Raw, Styles saved Reigns from an attack by Luke Gallows and Karl Anderson, then Reigns recovered and attacked Styles. Reigns was laid out when Styles retaliated.

At WrestleMania 32, Zack Ryder won his first Intercontinental Championship in a 7-man ladder match. The following night on Raw, Ryder lost the title to The Miz after Maryse, Miz's wife, distracted him. After Miz retained the title against Ryder on that week's SmackDown, Cesaro defeated Kevin Owens on the following episode of Raw to become the #1 contender for the championship and earn a title match against Miz at Payback.

On the April 11 episode of Raw, Shane McMahon started a tournament where the winners would face The New Day for the WWE Tag Team Championship. On the April 18 episode of Raw, the finals of the tournament were scheduled for Payback.

Sami Zayn and Kevin Owens have been feuding with each other since Owens made his debut at NXT TakeOver: R Evolution in 2014. At NXT TakeOver: Unstoppable, Owens injured Zayn in their NXT Championship match. Zayn returned at the Royal Rumble, eliminating Owens from the Royal Rumble match. On the March 7, 2016, episode of Raw, Zayn made his main roster debut and brawled with Owens. At WrestleMania 32, Zayn cost Owens the Intercontinental Championship in a ladder match, which Zack Ryder won. The following night on Raw, Owens attacked Zayn, preventing him to compete in the fatal four-way #1 contender match for the WWE World Heavyweight Championship. A match between the two was subsequently made for Payback.

On the April 11 episode of Raw, during a segment of The Highlight Reel where Chris Jericho was interviewing himself, Dean Ambrose interrupted and gave him a letter from Shane McMahon stating that The Highlight Reel has been cancelled and would be replaced by Ambrose's new talk show, The Ambrose Asylum. On the April 14 episode of SmackDown, after Jericho's match with Sami Zayn ended in disqualification, Ambrose, who was doing commentary with Kevin Owens during the match, helped Zayn fend off Jericho and Owens. On the April 18 episode of Raw, after Ambrose defeated Owens, Jericho attacked Ambrose with a Codebreaker, setting up a match between the two for Payback.

At WrestleMania 32, Charlotte defeated Sasha Banks and Becky Lynch with interference from her father Ric Flair to become the inaugural WWE Women's Champion. The following night on Raw, Charlotte held a ceremony to celebrate the new title and the women's division, but her arrogance led the other women in the ring to leave except for Natalya, who told Charlotte to learn a lesson in humility. After Charlotte stated that her family would always be better than the Hart family, Natalya locked her in the Sharpshooter submission hold. The following week on Raw, Natalya defeated Charlotte in a Women's Championship match, but by disqualification, therefore not winning the title. A rematch was subsequently scheduled for Payback, with Natalya announcing that her uncle Bret Hart would be in her corner.

On the WrestleMania 32 Kickoff pre-show, Kalisto defeated Ryback to retain the United States Championship. On the April 21 episode of SmackDown, Ryback defeated Kalisto in a non-title match, earning a title rematch against Kalisto at Payback.

Despite losing to The Undertaker at WrestleMania 32 in a Hell in a Cell match where he would gain control of Raw if he won, Shane McMahon was given temporary control of Raw from The Authority the next night by his father, WWE Chairman Vince McMahon. After Shane ran Raw for four consecutive weeks, Shane's sister Stephanie McMahon returned to announce that Vince McMahon would decide at Payback whether Stephanie or Shane is given control of Raw for good.

At WrestleMania 32, Baron Corbin won the André the Giant Memorial Battle Royal. Corbin made his main roster debut the next night on Raw, fighting Dolph Ziggler to a double-countout. They would proceed to attack each other, thus setting a match between the two at Payback.

== Event ==
Other on-screen personnel
| Role: | Name: |
|---|---|
| English commentators | Michael Cole (Main show) |
| English commentators | John "Bradshaw" Layfield (Main show) |
| English commentators | Byron Saxton (All matches) |
| English commentators | Mauro Ranallo (Pre-show) |
| English commentators | Kevin Owens (The Miz vs Cesaro) |
| Spanish commentators | Carlos Cabrera |
| Spanish commentators | Marcelo Rodríguez |
| German commentators | Carsten Schaefer |
| German commentators | Sebastian Hackl |
| Ring announcers | Eden Stiles |
| Ring announcers | JoJo |
| Referees | Charles Robinson |
| Referees | John Cone |
| Referees | Dan Engler |
| Referees | Jason Ayers |
| Referees | Rod Zapata |
| Referees | Darrick Moore |
| Referees | Chad Patton |
| Backstage interviewer | Byron Saxton |
| Pre-show panel | Renee Young |
| Pre-show panel | Corey Graves |
| Pre-show panel | Booker T |
| Pre-show panel | Jerry Lawler |

=== Pre-show ===
During the Payback Kickoff pre-show, Dolph Ziggler faced Baron Corbin. Ziggler pinned Corbin with a roll up to win the match.

After that, Kalisto defended the United States Championship against Ryback. Kalisto executed a Salida Del Sol on Ryback to retain the title. This was Ryback's last WWE match.

=== Preliminary matches ===
The actual pay-per-view opened with the final of the tournament to determine the #1 contenders to the WWE Tag Team Championship between Enzo Amore and Colin Cassady and The Vaudevillains (Aiden English and Simon Gotch). English was in the corner and Amore charged, resulting in Amore falling hard to the ring mat after being either kneed or kicked by English. Gotch then threw Amore into the ropes, with Amore's head hitting the ring mat hard after bouncing off the middle rope, followed by Amore falling onto the floor at ringside, apparently knocked out. Gotch tried to pick Amore up, although the referee intervened, ending the match as a no-contest for Amore to receive medical attention. According to Canoe.ca, Enzo's head got "whiplashed hard onto the mat", knocking him unconscious, which possibly made matters "worse when he then hit the floor since he couldn't protect himself." The audience in the building was not updated on Enzo's injury.

Next, Kevin Owens faced Sami Zayn. The match ended when Zayn attempted a Helluva Kick on Owens but Owens countered with a Superkick and executed a Pop Up Powerbomb to win the match. Owens remained at ringside as a guest commentator for the next match.

After that, The Miz (accompanied by Maryse) defended his Intercontinental Championship against Cesaro. In the end, Sami Zayn appeared to attack Kevin Owens who was on commentary for the match. The two fought on the ring apron until Cesaro knocked Zayn and Owens off the ring apron. Whilst Cesaro was distracted, The Miz pinned him with a roll-up to retain the title.

In the fourth match, Dean Ambrose faced Chris Jericho. In the end, as Jericho attempted a Lionsault, Ambrose countered by raising his knees and executed Dirty Deeds to win the match.

In the fifth match, Natalya, accompanied by her uncle Bret Hart, challenged Charlotte, accompanied by her father Ric Flair, for the WWE Women's Championship. The end came when referee Charles Robinson called for the bell as Charlotte applied the sharpshooter, despite Natalya not having submitted, meaning Charlotte retained the title. This was a repeat of the infamous Montreal Screwjob suffered by Bret Hart, and also advanced a second vintage storyline, that of Robinson as the "personal referee" of Flair, which dates back to her father Ric Flair's time in World Championship Wrestling and Robinson's "Little Naitch" gimmick. After the match, Bret Hart and Natalya applied sharpshooters in stereo on Flair and Charlotte, respectively.

=== Main event ===
Next, WWE Chairman Vince McMahon appeared to announce whether Stephanie or Shane McMahon should run Raw. After both Shane and Stephanie explained why they should run Raw, Vince decided that both Stephanie and Shane would run Raw jointly.

In the main event, Roman Reigns defended the WWE World Heavyweight Championship against AJ Styles. Early in the match, Styles took the advantage and applied the Calf Crusher, only for Reigns to reach the ropes, breaking the hold. Outside the ring, Styles performed a Phenomenal Forearm on Reigns, sending both men through a broadcast table. Reigns was counted out.

Shane McMahon restarted the title match with a no-count-out stipulation. When Styles tried an aerial attack, Reigns accidentally low blowed him and was disqualified, again losing the match but retaining his championship. This time, Stephanie McMahon restarted the title match under no-disqualification rules. Reigns countered a Phenomenal Forearm with a Superman Punch for a nearfall. Reigns followed with another Superman Punch and prepared to execute a Spear, however, Karl Anderson and Luke Gallows appeared and pulled Styles from the ring.

Anderson and Gallows executed a double-team Boot of Doom on Reigns, which was followed by a second Phenomenal Forearm by Styles, however Reigns placed his foot on the rope, thus voiding the count. The Usos appeared to even the odds against Anderson and Gallows. Reigns threw Styles onto the Usos and Gallows and Anderson and then proceeded to dive onto them. This resulted in Styles executing another Phenomenal Forearm from the barricade on Reigns. Back in the ring, Styles executed a springboard 450 splash for a nearfall. Ultimately, Reigns avoided another Phenomenal Forearm and pinned Styles after a spear to retain the title.

Backstage, Vince, Shane, and Stephanie McMahon agreed on a title rematch with an Extreme Rules stipulation between Reigns and Styles at Extreme Rules.

== Reception ==
As soon as the broadcasting of the event had stopped after the main event, WWE Champion Roman Reigns reportedly turned on the fans in the Allstate Arena, yelling angrily at them. Reigns had faced a hostile reaction from fans during the main event. For a photo on WWE.com showing the Payback main event, a fan's sign saying "When it Reigns, it bores" was edited by WWE to merely show "When it Reigns".

Critics gave mixed reactions to the event. In particular, they criticized WWE's promoting of the event as the start of a "new era" for WWE, with Vince McMahon decreeing that both Shane McMahon and Stephanie McMahon would run Raw together earning the commentary that "more McMahons isn't new but the same thing they've been doing for two decades", while the women's title match having a "lame finish calling back to 1997 out of context" in a repeat of the Montreal Screwjob during the 1997 Survivor Series. It was concluded that the "new era" was "only branding", as WWE are "still doing the exact same things", "with the same tired playbook", with "way too much of the counter-productive storytelling WWE has used for years".

Bob Kapur and Matthew Asher of Canoe.ca rated the overall show 3 out of 5. Kapur described WWE "straddling the line between the old and the new" at Payback. While "the new stuff worked well for the most part", "the old stuff" did not really work. Both reviewers felt that "the return to the already-tapped-dry well of McMahon Family drama" was overlong, with Kapur saying that it was also unnecessary if WWE had abided to the stipulation they set for Shane's match at WrestleMania 32. Kapur felt that the main event was merely "a showcase for [the McMahons'] storyline, and took away any significance of the title", while both reviewers panned the "two match restarts". Decrying how Shane and Stephanie ("non-wrestlers") overshadowed the main event, Kapur lamented: "Meet the new era, same as the old era. We all get fooled again." The main event was one of three matches rated 3 out of 5, the lowest rating issued (but some matches were not rated), while Owens-Zayn was the highest rated at 4 out of 5.

Dave Scherer of Pro Wrestling Insider gave his thoughts on the event. In the tag match, Enzo Amore's legit injury looked "ugly as hell". For the main event match, Scherer endorsed it as "a really well worked, good match, even if the fans still hated Reigns after he won." Special praise was reserved for Kevin Owens, with Scherer declaring that he "came off awesome tonight." For the Intercontinental title match, Scherer "didn't like the finish" and thought Cesaro should have won. The women's match was "solid" but its "finish was ridiculous and it was like a fart in church." Regarding Corbin's loss to Ziggler on the pre-show, Scherer said, "If you were hoping that WWE would learn from having new guys lose to older guys, well you can give that up ... Ugh." Vince McMahon's decision was described as nonsensical, given that as a businessman, he had just taken his "best asset and put it in a tenuous state". Lastly, after Vince said that he only listened to himself, not to the fans or the media, Scherer endorsed that "Truer words were never spoken."

James Caldwell of Pro Wrestling Torch rated as Owens-Zayn as the best match of the event with 3.75 stars out of 5, writing that "You could feel their passion wrestling each other and the crowd matched their intensity". The second best match was Ambrose-Jericho at 3.25 stars, which was "building to a really good finish, then blew a tire right before they reached the destination." The next-best match was the United States title match on the pre-show at 3.0 stars, which Caldwell wrote was "one of Ryback’s best matches in a long time and they engaged the crowd with a hot finishing sequence." The main event, rated 2.75 stars, was hurt by "the Shane-Stephanie business" and "the anticipated outcome of Reigns winning Super Cena style kicking out of multiple finishers", which "added fuel to the anti-Reigns fire." However, "Styles looked like he belonged in this spot three months into his WWE run". Lastly, the women's match and Vince's announcement were described as having "laughably bad endings ... back-to-back in the middle of the show".

== Aftermath ==
After the event, Enzo Amore was discharged from the hospital after being diagnosed with suffering a concussion. Amore was backstage on Raw the next evening but did not appear on the show. The Vaudevillains (Aiden English and Simon Gotch) were awarded a WWE Tag Team Championship match at Extreme Rules.

Following Payback, Ryan Reeves (Ryback) said that he had been sent home after requesting to be taken off WWE television. Reeves and WWE could not agree to a new contract due to Reeves' belief that all wrestlers in WWE should be paid equally regardless of their position on the card. On August 8, 2016, WWE officially parted ways with Reeves, thus making Payback his last WWE appearance.

On the following Raw, a championship rematch between WWE Women's Champion Charlotte and Natalya was scheduled for Extreme Rules as a submission match, with the added stipulation that any appearance by Ric Flair would result in Charlotte losing the title.

Also on Raw, another number one contender's match between Kevin Owens and Cesaro occurred, but the match ended in a no contest after Intercontinental Champion The Miz, who was on commentary, attacked Cesaro. Sami Zayn then ran down to the ring and the fight ended with Zayn standing tall and holding the title. On that week's SmackDown, Miz interrupted Zayn on "The Highlight Reel" and a match was later booked between the two, which Zayn won after Owens interfered. Cesaro then ran down to the ring and a brawl ensued, which ended with Cesaro holding the championship. On the May 9 episode of Raw, Shane and Stephanie McMahon scheduled a triple threat match between Owens, Miz, and Cesaro for the title at Extreme Rules. Zayn demanded to be inserted in the match as well, and defeated Miz in a non-title match to be added to the match, making it a fatal four-way match.

During a segment of "The Ambrose Asylum" with Stephanie McMahon, Stephanie canceled "Ambrose Asylum" and reinstated Chris Jericho's talk show, "The Highlight Reel". Jericho came out and attacked Ambrose, destroying Mitch the Potted Plant in the process. The following week, Ambrose attacked Jericho and destroyed Jericho's jacket. On the May 12 episode of SmackDown, Jericho attacked Ambrose and put the straitjacket on Ambrose. On the May 16 episode of Raw, Ambrose challenged Jericho to a match at Extreme Rules, and Jericho accepted. Ambrose then revealed that their match would be an asylum match.

A rematch between Baron Corbin and Dolph Ziggler took place on the May 9 episode of Raw, with Corbin winning this time. The following week, a no disqualification match between the two was scheduled for the Extreme Rules Kickoff pre-show.

The 2016 Payback was the final Payback held before WWE reintroduced the brand extension in July, which divided the main roster between the Raw and SmackDown brands where wrestlers were exclusively assigned to perform. The 2017 event was in turn held exclusively for Raw.

== Results ==
| No. | Results | Stipulations | Times |
|---|---|---|---|
| 1^{P} | Dolph Ziggler defeated Baron Corbin by pinfall | Singles match | 7:43 |
| 2^{P} | Kalisto (c) defeated Ryback by pinfall | Singles match for the WWE United States Championship | 8:45 |
| 3 | The Vaudevillains (Aiden English and Simon Gotch) defeated Enzo and Cass by technical knockout (Note: The match was stopped when Enzo Amore suffered a legit injury requiring immediate medical attention. WWE later reported that Amore had a concussion. No result was announced during the event but WWE later awarded the match to the Vaudevillains, naming them #1 contenders.) | Tag team match to determine #1 contenders for the WWE Tag Team Championship | 3:58 |
| 4 | Kevin Owens defeated Sami Zayn by pinfall | Singles match | 14:30 |
| 5 | The Miz (c) (with Maryse) defeated Cesaro by pinfall | Singles match for the WWE Intercontinental Championship | 11:20 |
| 6 | Dean Ambrose defeated Chris Jericho by pinfall | Singles match | 18:28 |
| 7 | Charlotte (c) (with Ric Flair) defeated Natalya (with Bret Hart) by submission (Note: Referee Charles Robinson called for the bell when Charlotte had locked Natalya into the Sharpshooter, in reference to the Montreal Screwjob.) | Singles match for the WWE Women's Championship | 13:04 |
| 8 | Roman Reigns (c) defeated AJ Styles by pinfall | No Disqualification match for the WWE World Heavyweight Championship (Note: This match first ended in a countout win for Styles, but was restarted by Shane McMahon as a no countout match. The match then ended in a disqualification win for Styles when Reigns hit a low blow, but was restarted by Stephanie McMahon under no disqualification rules.) | 26:03 |
(c) / – the champion(s) heading into the match; P / – the match was broadcast on the pre-show

=== WWE Tag Team Championship #1 Contender's Tournament ===
1st Round; Raw; April 11, 2016; SmackDown; April 12, 2016 (Aired: April 14)
The Usos (Jey Uso and Jimmy Uso) | Pinfall
The Social Outcasts (Curtis Axel and Heath Slater) | 4:16
Goldust and Fandango | 2:01
The Vaudevillains (Aiden English and Simon Gotch) | Pinfall
Enzo and Cass (Enzo Amore and Colin Cassidy) | Pinfall
The Ascension (Konnor and Viktor) | 4:20
The Lucha Dragons (Kalisto and Sin Cara) | 3:09
The Dudley Boyz (Bubba Ray Dudley and D-Von Dudley) | Pinfall

Semifinals; Raw; April 18, 2016
The Usos | 3:26
The Vaudevillains | Pinfall
Enzo and Cass | Pinfall
The Dudley Boyz | 08:33

Final; Payback; May 1, 2016
The Vaudevillains | No Contest (3:58)
Enzo and Cass | No Contest (3:58)
