= Simon Gotch =

American professional wrestler

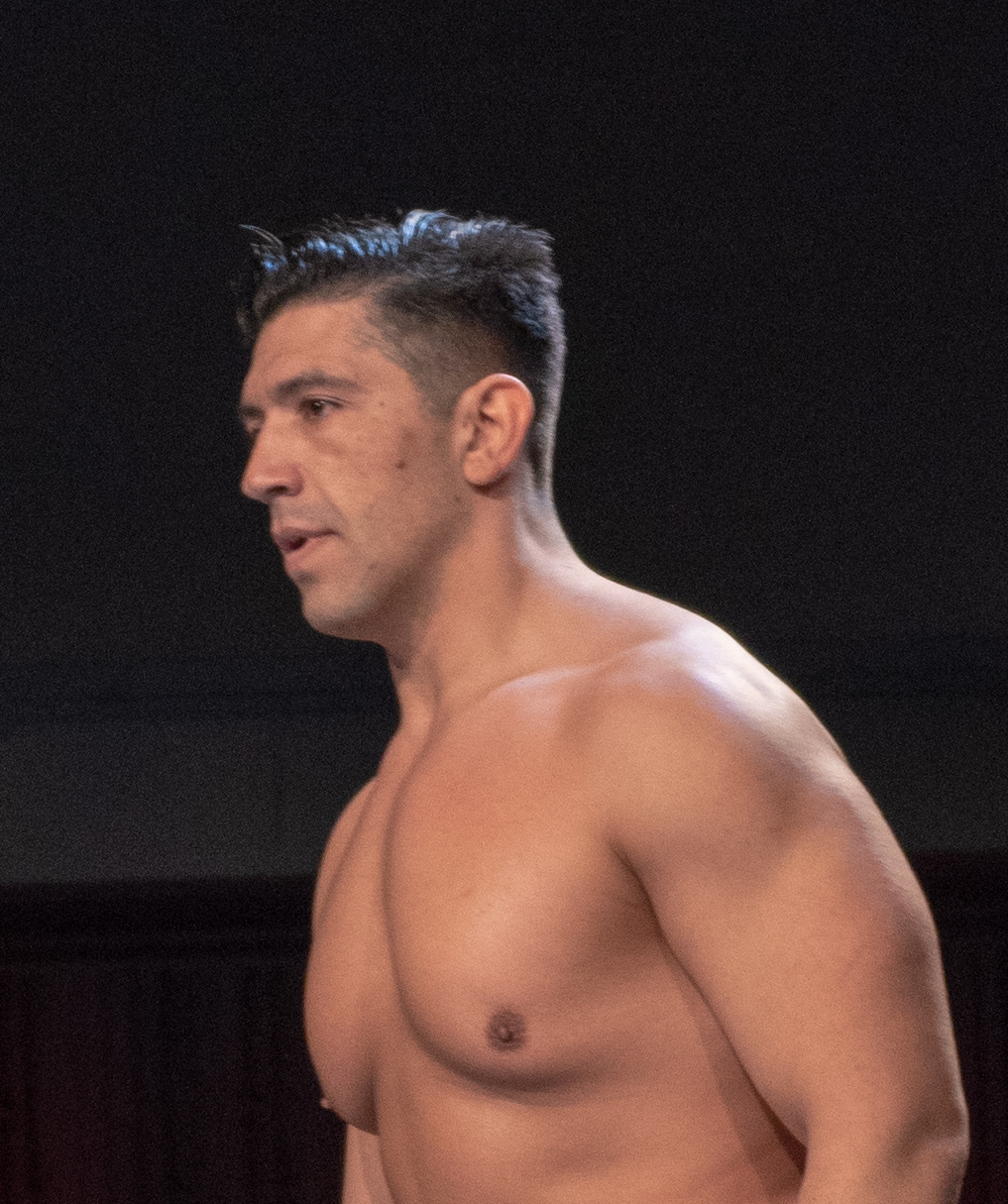
- Gotch in April 2019

Personal information
- Born: Seth Lesser; October 18, 1982 (age 44) Santa Rosa, California, U.S.

Professional wrestling career
- Ring name(s): Ryan Drago; Seth Lesser; Simon Grimm; Simon Gotch; Super Otaku; Psycho Seth
- Billed height: 6 ft 1 in (185 cm)
- Billed weight: 220 lb (100 kg)
- Billed from: Hoboken, New Jersey
- Trained by: Donovan Morgan; Michael Modest; Ric Thompson; Daniel Bryan; Harley Race; WWE Performance Center
- Debut: 2002

Seth Lesser (born October 18, 1982), better known by the ring name Simon Gotch, is an American professional wrestler. He currently performs on the independent circuit. He is best known for his time in WWE, where he held the NXT Tag Team Championship as one-half of The Vaudevillains along with Aiden English and also worked for the main roster on its SmackDown brand. He also competed for Major League Wrestling (MLW).

From 2002 until 2013, he worked under the ring name Ryan Drago, invoking the image of early 20th century professional wrestlers or strongmen. In 2013 he joined WWE, retaining the "classic wrestler" image, but being renamed "Simon Gotch" (after Frank Gotch and Karl Gotch), together with Aiden English they often appeared in silent movie segments. After leaving WWE he began to use the name Simon Grimm, but was legally able to use the name Simon Gotch in April 2018.

== Early life ==
Lesser was born on October 18, 1982, in Santa Rosa, California. He is Jewish.

== Professional wrestling career ==
=== Early career (2002–2012) ===
Lesser competed on the independent circuit, appearing for promotions such as All Pro Wrestling, Pro Wrestling Guerrilla, Chikara and Full Impact Pro. He most notably competed as Ryan Drago, a character reminiscent of early 20th-century grapplers such as George Hackenschmidt. He won his first title, World League Wrestling's WLW Tag Team Championship, on November 10, 2012, with Elvis Aliaga.

=== WWE (2013–2017) ===
==== NXT (2013–2016) ====
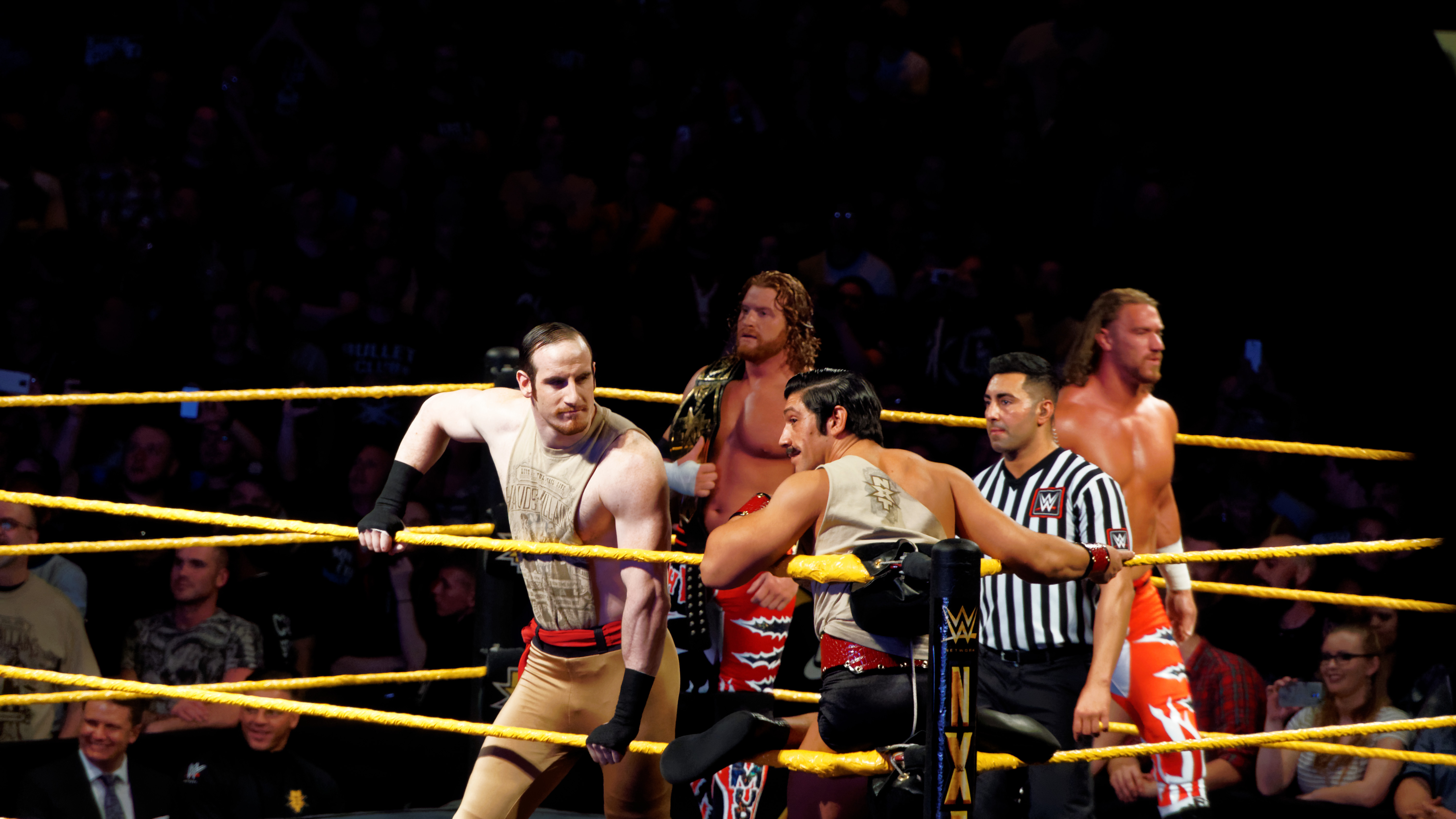
The Vaudevillains in NXT in 2015

In June 2013, Lesser signed a developmental contract with WWE and was assigned to its developmental territory NXT, where he adopted the ring name Simon Gotch. In June 2014, Gotch formed a tag team with Aiden English known as The Vaudevillains, with the gimmick of a pair of vaudevillians. The Vaudevillains made their in-ring debut as a team on the June 19 episode of NXT, defeating Angelo Dawkins and Travis Tyler. In August, The Vaudevillains participated in a tournament to determine the number one contenders to the NXT Tag Team Championship, before losing to The Lucha Dragons (Sin Cara and Kalisto) in the finals. On the October 30 episode of NXT, The Vaudevillains won a tag team battle royal to become the number one contenders to the NXT Tag Team Championship. They received their title match at NXT TakeOver: R Evolution against The Lucha Dragons, but were unsuccessful.

After some hiatus, The Vaudevillains returned on the June 3, 2015, episode of NXT, defeating Jason Jordan and Marcus Louis. On the July 8 episode of NXT, the Vaudevillains defeated Enzo Amore and Colin Cassady to become the number one contenders to the NXT Tag Team Championship. The Vaudevillians received their title match on the July 29 episode of NXT against Blake and Murphy, in which they were unsuccessful after Alexa Bliss caused a distraction. The Vaudevillains, with Blue Pants in their corner, defeated Blake and Murphy in a rematch at NXT TakeOver: Brooklyn to win the NXT Tag Team Championship. On November 11 episode of NXT, they lost the titles to Scott Dawson and Dash Wilder, ending their reign at 61 days. On the November 25 episode of NXT, the Vaudevillains challenged Dash and Dawson to a rematch for the titles in a losing effort. On the December 23 episode of NXT, the Vaudevillains competed in a four-way tag team match against Blake and Murphy, The Hype Bros and Chad Gable and Jason Jordan, which was won by Gable and Jordan. On the March 16, 2016, episode of NXT, the Vaudevillains were defeated by Gable and Jordan, now known as American Alpha, in a number one contender's match for the NXT Tag Team Championship.

==== Main roster (2016–2017) ====
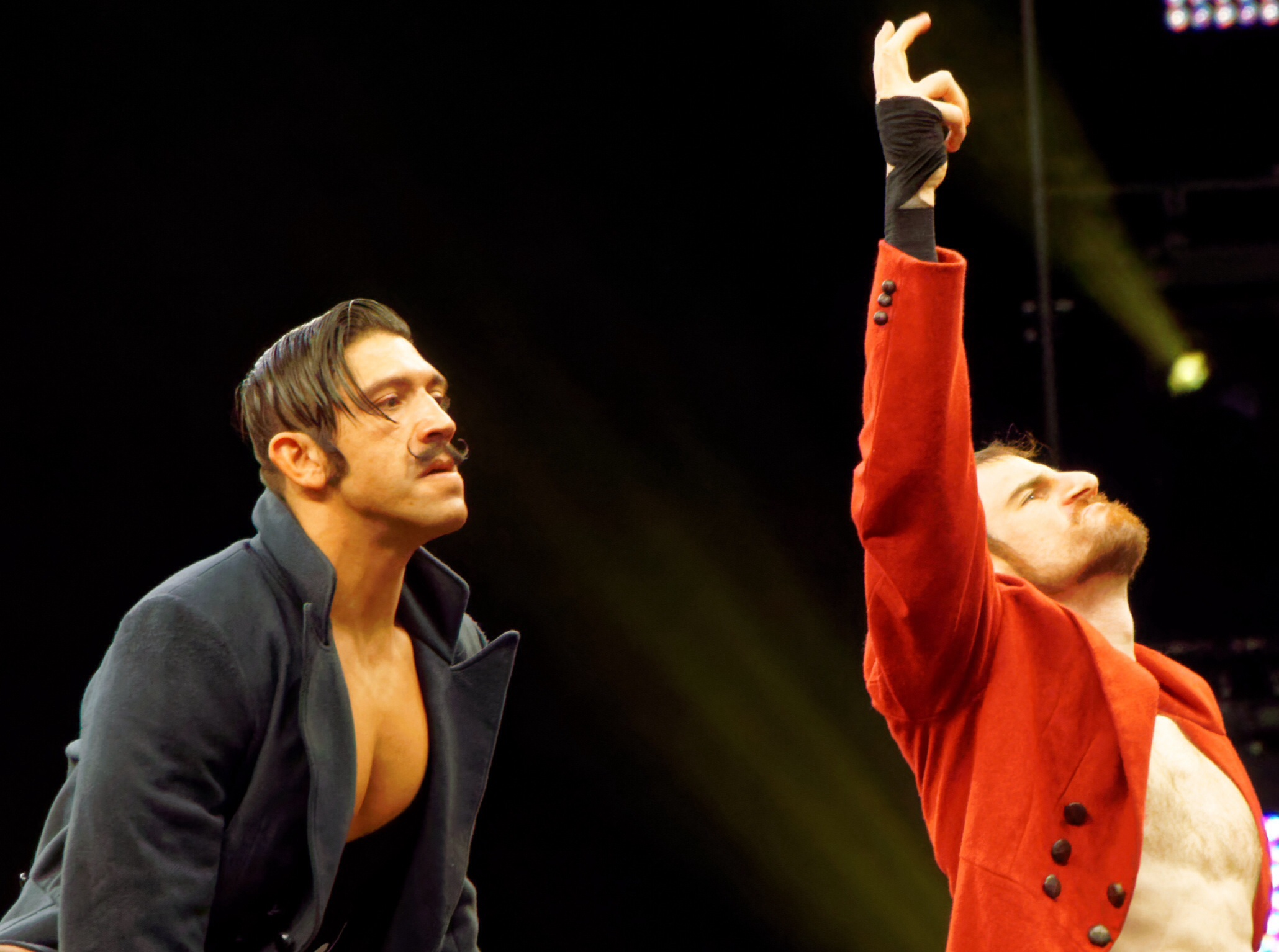
The VaudeVillians at WrestleMania 32 in 2016

On the April 7, 2016, episode of SmackDown, the Vaudevillains made their main roster debut as heels, defeating The Lucha Dragons. On the April 11 episode of Raw, the Vaudevillains were announced as one of the teams to participate in the number one contenders tournament for the WWE Tag Team Championship, where they defeated Goldust and Fandango in the first round later that week on SmackDown and The Usos on the April 18 episode of Raw in the semi-finals. At Payback, the Vaudevillains faced Enzo Amore and Colin Cassady in the finals of the tournament. The match resulted in a no-contest due to a legit concussion suffered by Amore, and the Vaudevillains were declared number one contenders. While the Vaudevillains lost to The New Day at Extreme Rules, they competed in a fatal 4-way tag team match, also involving Enzo Amore and Big Cass and Gallows and Anderson, for the titles at Money in the Bank in a losing effort.

On July 19 at the 2016 WWE draft, the Vaudevillains were drafted to SmackDown in the tenth round of picks. In August, a tag team tournament for the newly created WWE SmackDown Tag Team Championship was set up by SmackDown general manager Daniel Bryan and SmackDown commissioner Shane McMahon, where the winner of the tournament would be crowned the inaugural champions. On the August 30 episode of SmackDown, the Vaudevillains competed in the first round match of the tournament, where they were defeated by The Hype Bros. On the November 8 episode of SmackDown, the Vaudevillains were defeated by Breezango (Tyler Breeze and Fandango) in a qualifying match for a spot in Team SmackDown at Survivor Series.

On the January 31, 2017, episode of SmackDown, the Vaudevillains, along with five other teams, answered an open challenge set by American Alpha, where a brawl between all six teams ensued before being broken up by referees and officials. At Elimination Chamber, the Vaudevillains competed in a tag team turmoil match for the WWE SmackDown Tag Team Championship, where they were eliminated by Heath Slater and Rhyno. On the WrestleMania 33 kickoff show, Gotch wrestled his last televised WWE match when he competed in the André the Giant Memorial Battle Royal, which was won by Mojo Rawley. The Vaudevillians lost to American Alpha during a dark match before Smackdown on April 4. Then on April 5, 2017, it was announced that Simon Gotch had been officially released from his WWE contract.

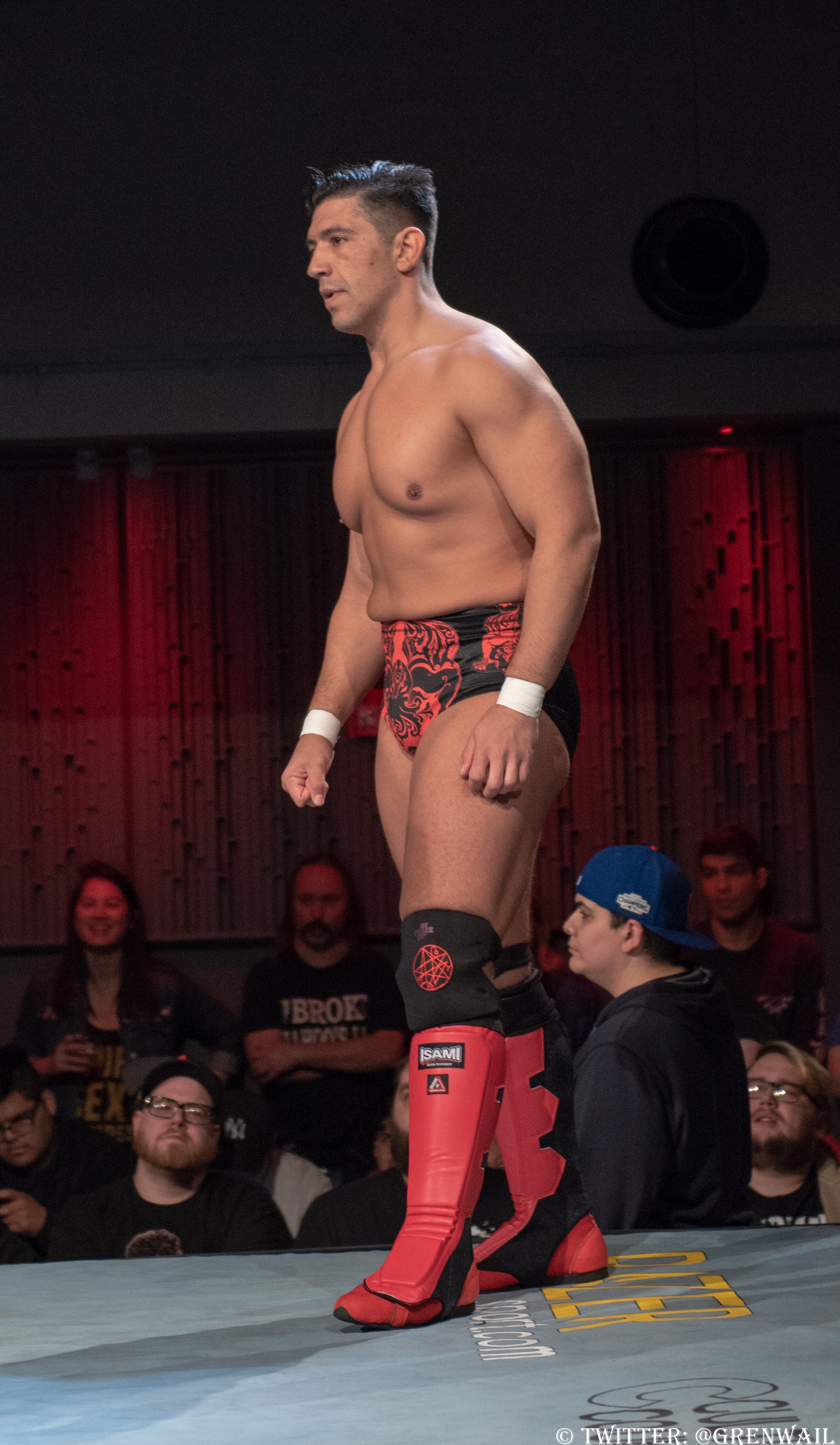
Grimm in 2019

=== Independent circuit (2017–present) ===
After his release from WWE, Lesser returned to the independent circuit, adopting the ring name "Simon Grimm". On July 23, 2017, Grimm won his first singles title when he defeated both Daisuke Sekimoto and Doug Williams for the vacant XWA Frontier Sports Championship in Colchester, England. Less than a week later, Lesser wrestled for Pro Wrestling Pride defeating Doug Williams and Ultimo Tiger. In September, Grimm teamed with Dasher Hatfield and Mark Angelosetti in Chikara's 2017 King of Trios tournament, where they made it to the quarterfinals, before losing to Pete Dunne, Trent Seven and Tyler Bate.

Grimm made his Ring of Honor debut on December 24, 2017, ROH taping where he teamed up with Flip Gordon, where they faced The Dawgs (Rhett Titus and Will Ferrara) in a losing effort. In an interview on April 24, 2018, Grimm revealed that WWE had dropped the trademark to the Simon Gotch name, and he started using the name in independent promotions shortly after.

=== Major League Wrestling (2018–2021) ===
==== Team Filthy (2018–2019) ====
In early 2018, Gotch began wrestling for Major League Wrestling (MLW). Shortly after he joined Tom Lawlor's faction Team Filthy, which included Lawlor and Fred Yehi. In his debut match, he teamed with Team Filthy's Seth Petruzelli to defeat Team TBD (Jason Cade and Jimmy Yuta). Gotch then started holding the "Simon Gotch Prize Fight Challenge" daring anyone to last five minutes in an exhibition match with him, without being pinned or submitting, with the prize being a purported large, but really a small amount of money. The first challenge took place on May 3, 2018. This went on for a few months with him defeating mostly local talent, with legends like Gangrel mixed in. During Lawlor's storyline with Low Ki over the MLW World Heavyweight Championship, Gotch walked Lawlor into an ambush by Ki's faction Promociones Dorado. The feud reached its boiling point on a December episode of MLW Fusion where Gotch faced Lawlor in a "no ropes, no disqualification" match, which was won by Lawlor.

==== Contra Unit (2019–2021) ====
Following his betrayal of Lawlor, he was defeated by Ace Romero in his first loss during a Simon Gotch Prize Fight Challenge on January 2, 2019. Gotch returned to MLW Fusion on March 2, 2019, forming the heel faction Contra Unit with the debuting Jacob Fatu and Josef Samael. In their debut appearance they attacked the new MLW World Heavyweight Champion Tom Lawlor following his cage match against Low Ki at Intimidation Games. The following week, Contra Unit attacked Ace Romero during his match with Gotch.

=== Pro Wrestling NOAH (2022) ===
On March 27, 2022, Pro Wrestling NOAH announced that Gotch would be one of a handful of foreign talent that would be coming to Japan to compete for them. On April 30 at the Majestic 2022 at Ryogoku Kokugikan, Gotch would have his first match for NOAH facing off against Masakatsu Funaki for the GHC National Title. Funaki was able to defeat Gotch and retain his title. A few days later Gotch would pick up his first win under the Pro Wrestling NOAH banner when he defeated Kinya Okada on May 5, 2022, at Korakuen Hall as part of the "Dream on 2022" event.

=== Total Nonstop Action Wrestling (2024) ===
Gotch made his TNA Wrestling debut on the February 8, 2024 episode of TNA Wrestling, attacking Josh Alexander after his match with Alan Angels. On February 23 at No Surrender, Gotch was defeated by Alexander.

== Other media ==
Gotch appears as a playable character in the video games WWE 2K16 and WWE 2K17.

== Championships and accomplishments ==
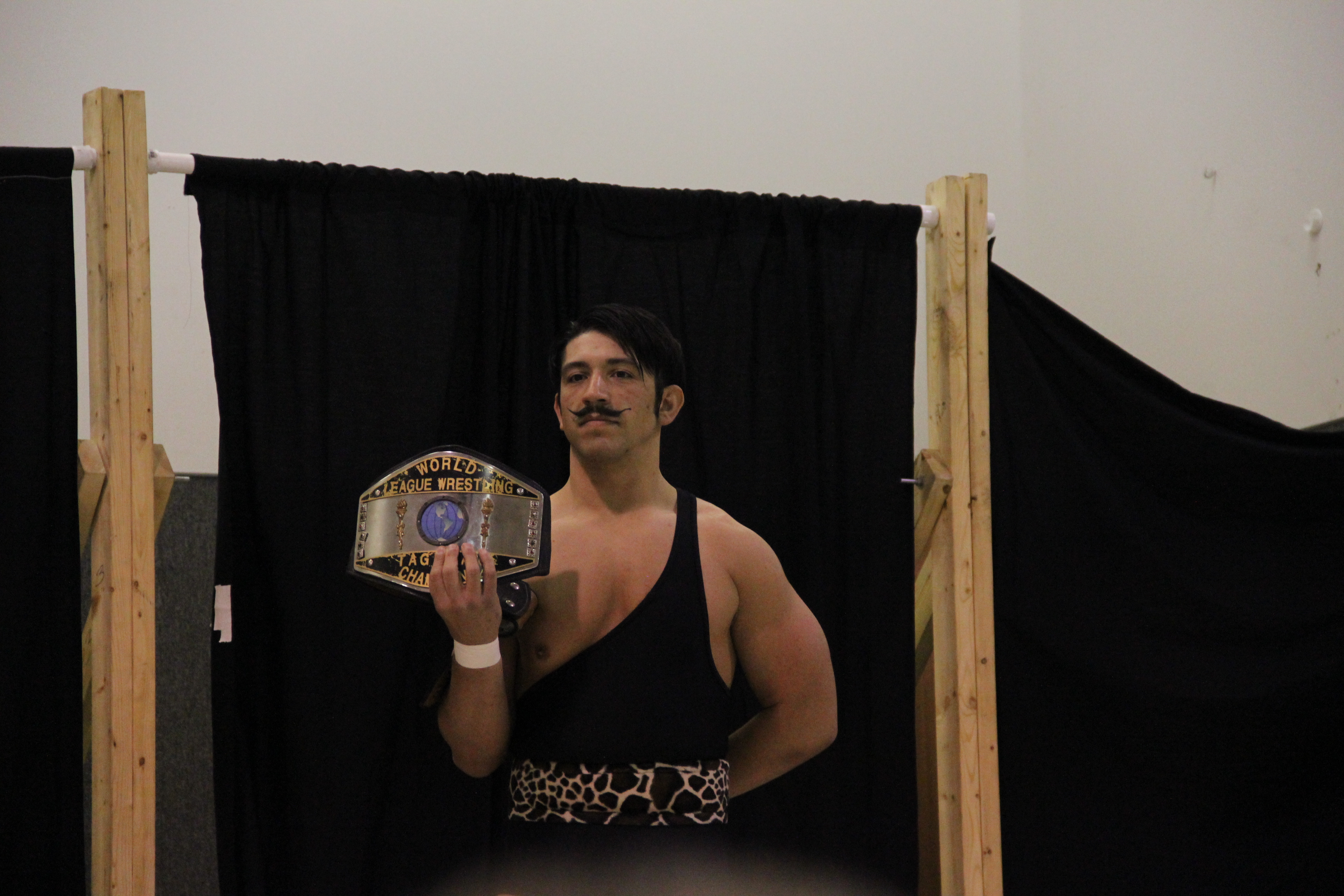
Ryan Drago as the WLW Tag Team Champion

- Pro Wrestling Illustrated
  - Ranked No. 175 of the top 500 singles wrestlers in the PWI 500 in 2016
- Tri States Wrestling
  - TSW US Highway Championship (1 time)
- World League Wrestling
  - WLW Tag Team Championship (1 time) – with Elvis Aliaga
- WWE
  - NXT Tag Team Championship (1 time) – with Aiden English
  - WWE Tag Team Championship #1 Contender Tournament (2016) – with Aiden English
- Xtreme Intense Championship Wrestling
  - XICW Xtreme Intense Championship (1 time)
- Xtreme Wrestling Alliance
  - XWA Frontier Sports Championship (1 time)

== See also ==
- List of Jewish professional wrestlers
