= Matthew Rehwoldt =

American professional wrestler

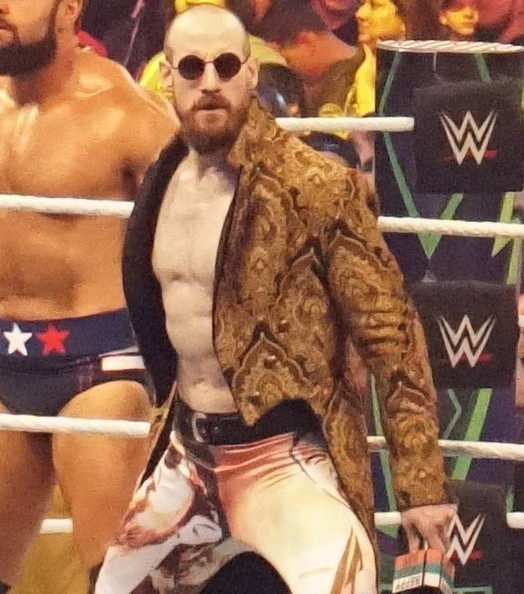
- Rehwoldt as Aiden English in 2018

Personal information
- Born: Matthew Thomas Rehwoldt; October 7, 1987 (age 39) Chicago, Illinois, U.S.
- Education: Columbia College Chicago
- Spouse: Shaul Guerrero (m. 2016)
- Family: Guerrero (by marriage)

Professional wrestling career
- Ring name(s): Aiden English; Matt Marquee; Matt Morris; Matt Rehwoldt; Matthew Rehwoldt
- Billed height: 6 ft 3 in (191 cm)
- Billed weight: 215 lb (98 kg)
- Billed from: Chicago, Illinois
- Trained by: Florida Championship Wrestling; Steve Keirn
- Debut: July 24, 2009

Matthew Thomas Rehwoldt (born October 7, 1987) is an American color commentator and professional wrestler. He is signed to Total Nonstop Action Wrestling (TNA) as a color commentator. He is also known for his time in WWE from 2012 to 2020, where he performed under the ring name Aiden English.

Rehwoldt debuted on the independent circuit in 2009. In 2012, he signed a development contract with WWE and was assigned to the farm territory Florida Championship Wrestling and later to NXT. In NXT, he formed a tag team called The Vaudevillains with Simon Gotch, winning the NXT Tag Team Championship. They were called to WWE's main roster in 2016, but the team ended in 2017 when Gotch was released. English was then paired with Rusev, formed a tag team named Rusev Day. In 2019, he became a color commentator on 205 Live and NXT UK. After being released from WWE in 2020, Rehwoldt began wrestling for Impact Wrestling and on the independent circuit under both his real name and the ring name Matt Morris.

Outside of wrestling, Rehwoldt started the "Rough Cuts" social media campaign for unfinished art and the "Wrestling With Whiskey" project on YouTube.

== Early life ==
Matthew Thomas Rehwoldt was born on October 7, 1987 in Chicago, Illinois, where he developed an interest in acting at an early age. By the age of 20, he had appeared in over 20 stage productions. After graduating from Lyons Township High School, he studied acting (with a focus on stage combat) at Columbia College Chicago, graduating in 2010 with a Bachelor of Arts.

== Professional wrestling career ==
=== Independent circuit (2009–2012) ===
While attending college, Rehwoldt trained as a professional wrestler. He made his professional wrestling debut on July 24, 2009 at an IWA Mid-South event under the ring name Matt Morris, defeating TJ Panic. He wrestled for promotions such as Chicago Style Wrestling, where he formed a tag team named "The Ryte Stuff" with Barry Ryte.

=== WWE (2012–2020) ===
==== Developmental territories (2012–2014) ====
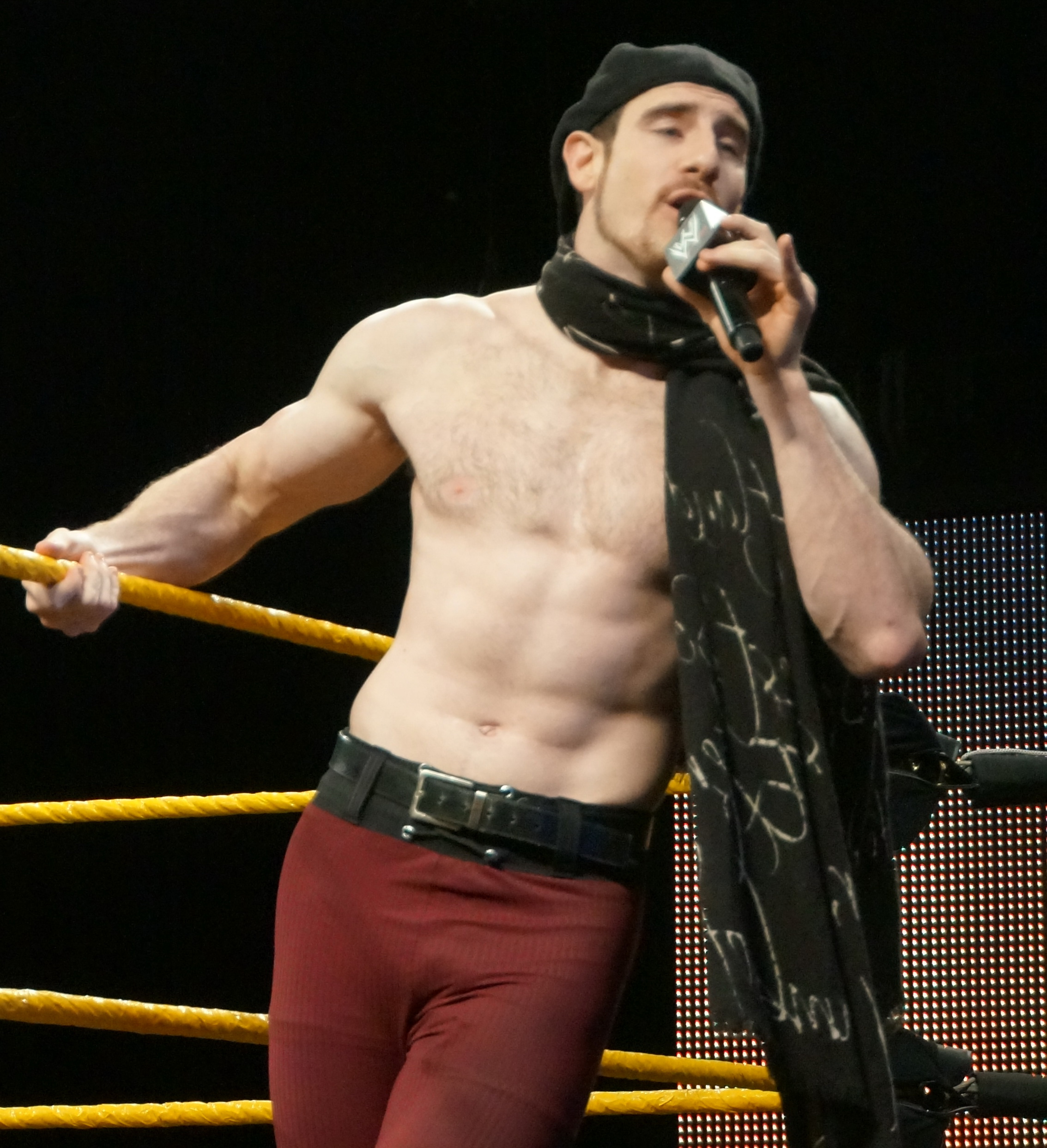
English in March 2014

Rehwoldt signed a contract with WWE in early 2012, and was assigned to its developmental territory, Florida Championship Wrestling (FCW), where he began using the ring name "Aiden English," debuting on March 1, 2012 as part of an 8-man tag team match. He made his televised debut on the March 15, 2012 taping of FCW television, airing on April 15, 2012, teaming with Audrey Marie in an intergender tag team match against Rick Victor and Paige.

After WWE rebranded FCW as NXT in 2012, English's television debut took place on the June 27 episode of the rebooted NXT taped at Full Sail University, losing to Leo Kruger. English was used primarily as a jobber throughout the rest of the year, losing to wrestlers including Bray Wyatt, Ryback, and Big E Langston. He scored his first televised win on the September 18, 2013 episode of NXT, defeating Michael Q. Laurie.

A week later, on the September 25 episode of NXT, English sang a parody version of the "Major-General's Song" from the musical The Pirates of Penzance while approaching the ring. He subsequently began singing before, during and after his matches, while also establishing himself as a heel. Throughout the year, English scored wins over Jason Jordan and Camacho. In the beginning of 2014, English began a feud with Colin Cassady, losing to him on the January 1 episode of NXT in a sing-off but defeating him in several matches.

==== The Vaudevillains (2014–2017) ====
In June 2014, English formed a tag team with Simon Gotch, known as the Vaudevillains. The duo turned face when they feuded with Blake and Murphy. The feud escalated to NXT TakeOver: Brooklyn, where the Vaudevillains defeated Blake and Murphy to win the NXT Tag Team Championship. On the November 11 episode of NXT, the Vaudevillains lost the title to Dash and Dawson, ending their reign at 61 days. On the November 25 episode of NXT, the Vaudevillains faced Dash and Dawson in a rematch for the title in a losing effort. On the December 23 episode of NXT, the Vaudevillains competed in a four-way tag team match against Blake and Murphy, The Hype Bros, and Chad Gable and Jason Jordan, won by Gable and Jordan. On the March 16, 2016 episode of NXT, the Vaudevillains were defeated by Gable and Jordan, later known as American Alpha, in a #1 contenders match for the NXT Tag Team Championship.

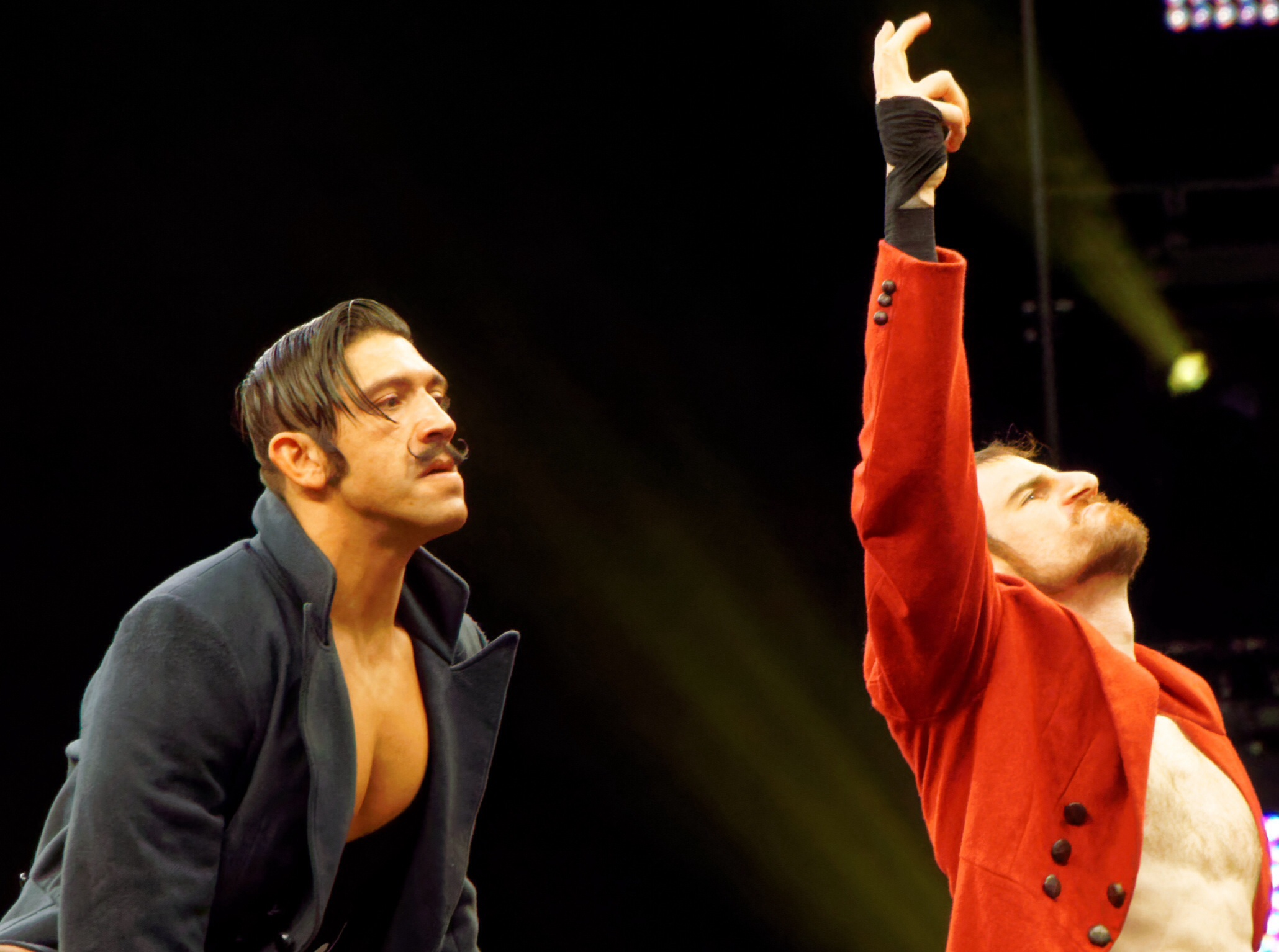
English (right) with Simon Gotch in April 2016

On the April 7, 2016 episode of SmackDown, the Vaudevillains made their main roster debut as heels, defeating the Lucha Dragons. On the April 11 episode of Raw, the Vaudevillains were announced as one of the teams to participate in the #1 contenders tournament for the WWE Tag Team Championship, where they defeated Goldust and Fandango in the first round later that week on SmackDown and The Usos on the April 18 episode of Raw in the semi-finals. At Payback, the Vaudevillains faced Enzo Amore and Colin Cassady in the finals of the tournament. The match resulted in a no-contest due to a legit concussion by Amore, and the Vaudevillains were declared number one contenders. At Extreme Rules, the Vaudevillains received their shot at the titles against The New Day in a losing effort. At Money in the Bank, The Vaudevillains competed in a Fatal 4-way tag team match also involving Enzo and Cass and Luke Gallows and Karl Anderson for the titles in a losing effort.

On July 19 at the 2016 WWE draft, the Vaudevillains were drafted to SmackDown in the tenth round of picks. In August, a tag team tournament for the newly created WWE SmackDown Tag Team Championship was set up by SmackDown general manager Daniel Bryan and SmackDown commissioner Shane McMahon, where the winners of the tournament would be crowned the inaugural champions. On the August 30 episode of SmackDown, the Vaudevillains would compete in the first round match of the tournament, where they were defeated by The Hype Bros. On the November 8 episode of SmackDown, the Vaudevillains were defeated by Breezango (Tyler Breeze and Fandango) in a qualifying match for a spot in Team SmackDown at Survivor Series. On the January 31, 2017 episode of SmackDown, the Vaudevillains, along with five other teams, answered an open challenge set by American Alpha, where a brawl between all six teams ensued before being broken up by referees and officials. At Elimination Chamber, the Vaudevillains competed in a tag team turmoil match for the WWE SmackDown Tag Team Championship, where they were eliminated by Heath Slater and Rhyno. At WrestleMania 33, English competed in the André the Giant Memorial Battle Royal, which was won by Mojo Rawley. On April 5, 2017, English's partner Simon Gotch was released from WWE.

==== Rusev Day (2017–2018) ====
Following the team's disbandment, English returned to singing prior to his matches. In May 2017, he entered into a feud with Tye Dillinger, losing to him at Backlash. At Battleground on July 23, English once again faced Dillinger, this time in a winning effort.

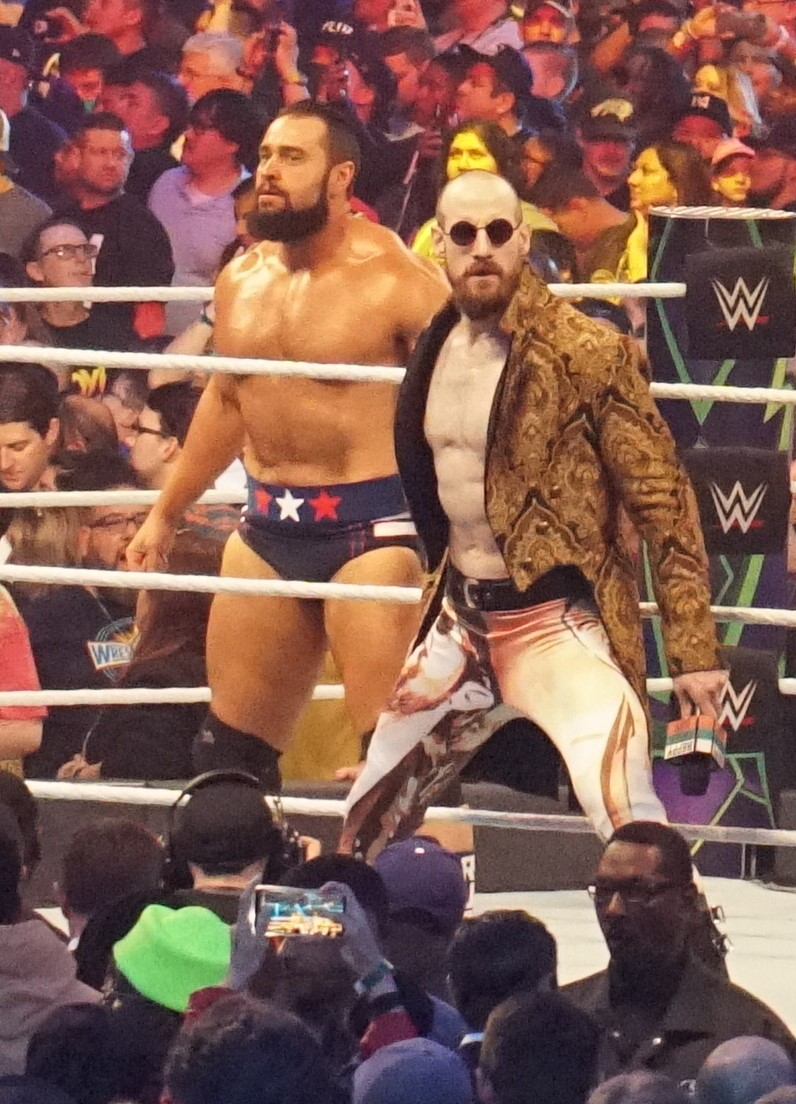
English (right) with Rusev at WrestleMania 34

In September, English allied with Rusev during a rivalry Rusev had been having with Randy Orton. After losing to Orton at SummerSlam, Rusev issued a rematch to Orton following a match with English, which Orton had won. English distracted Orton and allowed Rusev to pick up the victory in nine seconds, the same time that Orton had defeated Rusev in at SummerSlam. The following week, Rusev held "The Pride of Bulgaria Celebration," and was praised by the mayor of his hometown. English sang a song to commemorate the occasion. During the song, Orton appeared and delivered RKOs to both English and Rusev. From there on out, crowds began chanting "Rusev Day" during Rusev's matches, and he and English would become one of the company's most popular acts, despite their placement as villains.

Throughout the rest of the year, Rusev and English wrestled as a tag team, participating in a fatal four-way tag team match for the SmackDown Tag Team Championship at Clash of Champions also involving The New Day, Chad Gable and Shelton Benjamin, as well as the champions The Usos. They were unsuccessful in winning. On January 28, 2018, English entered the 2018 Royal Rumble match, but was eliminated by Finn Bálor. At WrestleMania 34, English entered the André the Giant Memorial Battle Royal, but was the first person eliminated; Matt Hardy would eventually win the match. English would re-appear later in the night with a freshly shaved head to manage Rusev in his fatal four-way match against Randy Orton, Jinder Mahal and Bobby Roode, but Rusev was unsuccessful as he was pinned by Mahal. Later, throughout the summer, English and Rusev established themselves as fan favorites.

In July 2018, English started a feud with Rusev when, on the July 24 episode of SmackDown Live, English accidentally knocked Lana out. The following weeks, English interfered in the matches between Andrade Cien Almas and Zelina Vega and Rusev and Lana, turning back to a heel in the process. The feud escalated when, on the September 18 episode of SmackDown Live, English attacked Rusev with a microphone and alluded to Lana and he having an affair. The storyline concluded on October 9, when it was revealed in a video that English made romantic advances towards Lana, to which she deflected. On the October 23 episode of SmackDown Live, Rusev defeated English, ending their feud.

==== Color commentator (2019–2020) ====
In January 2019, it was announced that English would join the commentary team of 205 Live beginning on January 22, 2019, replacing Percy Watson, while still also participating on SmackDown. On April 4, English lost to Kassius Ohno at WrestleMania Axxess, in a match that aired on WWE Worlds Collide on April 14. This would become his final match in the company. On November 1, 2019, English appeared as a guest commentator on SmackDown, as part of a commentary team filling in for Michael Cole and Corey Graves. On April 15, 2020, English was released from his WWE contract due to the budget cuts stemming from the COVID-19 pandemic.

=== Independent circuit (2020–present) ===
After his WWE release, he began to work on the independent circuit under his real name. On September 17, 2020, Rehwoldt had his first match on the independent circuit for Zelo Wrestling where he defeated Nick Brubaker.

=== Impact Wrestling/Total Nonstop Action Wrestling (2021–present) ===
At Slammiversary, on July 17, 2021, a vignette aired promoting Rehwoldt's arrival to Impact Wrestling. At Homecoming, Rehwoldt made his debut as part of the Homecoming tournament, teaming with Deonna Purrazzo to defeat Hernandez and Alisha Edwards in the first round, Matt Cardona and Chelsea Green in the semi-finals, and Decay (Crazzy Steve and Rosemary) in the finals to become the Homecoming King and Queen.

In early 2022, Rehwoldt would join the commentary team regularly, replacing D'Lo Brown.

On October 11, 2026 at Bound for Glory, Rehwoldt would enter the Call Your Shot Gauntlet match, entering at number 8, but would be quickly eliminated by Heather by Elegance.

=== New Japan Pro-Wrestling (2021–2022) ===
At NJPW Resurgence, Rehwoldt made his New Japan Pro-Wrestling (NJPW) debut as part of the English commentary team. Rehwoldt made his debut for the August 20, 2021 airing of NJPW Strong in a match against Alex Coughlin under the ring name "Matt Morris".

== Other media ==
Rehwoldt, as Aiden English, appears in five video games, WWE SuperCard, WWE 2K16, WWE 2K17, WWE 2K18, and WWE 2K19.

He frequently appeared on Xavier Woods' UpUpDownDown YouTube channel, where he played video games together with several other wrestlers.

Aside from his professional wrestling career, English started the campaign "Rough Cuts" on social media, where people share their unfinished art on Twitter or Instagram. Also, in 2018, he started the project "Wrestling With Whiskey," where, under his real name, he uploads videos of Whiskey tastings, Q & A's etc. on the project's YouTube channel. He does stream via Twitch using the username DramaKingMatt.

== Personal life ==
In December 2014, Rehwoldt became engaged to fellow professional wrestler Shaul Guerrero, the daughter of Eddie Guerrero and Vickie Guerrero. They were married in Florida on January 3, 2016.

Rehwoldt is a fan of The Best Show with Tom Scharpling, calling the show in April and May 2011 when it was still broadcast on WFMU.

== Championships and accomplishments ==
- Impact Wrestling
  - 2021 Homecoming King and Queen Tournament – with Deonna Purrazzo
- Pro Wrestling Illustrated
  - Ranked No. 171 of the top 500 singles wrestlers in the PWI 500 in 2016
- WWE
  - NXT Tag Team Championship (1 time) – with Simon Gotch
  - WWE Tag Team Championship #1 Contender Tournament (2016) – with Simon Gotch
