= XWA Frontier Sports Championship =

British professional wrestling championship

Details
- Promotion: XWA
- Date established: 6 December 2015
- Date retired: 20 September 2018
Statistics
- First champion(s): Danny Blaze
- Final champion(s): Simon Grimm
- Longest reign: Simon Grimm (424 days)
- Shortest reign: Jody Fleisch (134 days)
- Oldest champion: Doug Williams (42 Years, 347 Days)
- Youngest champion: Danny Blaze (31 Years, 57 Days)

The XWA Frontier Sports Championship was a professional wrestling championship contested for in the XWA professional wrestling. Championship reigns are determined by professional wrestling matches, in which competitors are involved in scripted rivalries. These narratives create feuds between the various competitors, which cast them as villains and the heroes.

== Tournament ==
The tournament to crown the inaugural champion was held on 6 December 2015. There was six semi final matches, in which the winners would be moved to the elimination final.

Semi-Finals:

- Doug Williams defeated Lord Gideon Grey.
- Pastor William Eaver defeated Voodoo.
- Jody Fleisch defeated James Castle.
- Jonny Storm defeated Paul Tyrrell.
- Danny Blaze defeated Richard Parliament.
- Rhia O'Reilly vs Pollyanna was declared a no contest after The Congregation (Pastor William Eaver, James Castle and Isaac Zercher) attacked both competitors

Final:

- Danny Blaze defeated Doug Williams, Pastor William Eaver, Jody Fleisch and Jonny Storm.

== Reigns ==
No.	Champion	Reign	Date	Days held	Location	Event	Notes	Ref.
1	Danny Blaze	1	6 December 2015	252	Colchester, Essex	XWA 38: Brawl at the Charter Hall	Defeated Doug Williams, 'Pastor' William Eaver, Jody Fleisch and Jonny Storm in an elimination match.	
2	Doug Williams	1	14 August 2016	209	Colchester, Essex	XWA 42: The Summer Supershow		
3	Jody Fleisch	1	11 March 2017	134	Colchester, Essex	XWA 45: Goldrush		
4	Simon Grimm	1	23 July 2017	424	Colchester, Essex	XWA 48	This was a three-way match for the vacant title.	
–	Retired		20 September 2018					

== See also ==
- Professional wrestling in the United Kingdom
