= The Usos =

Samoan-American professional wrestling tag team brothers

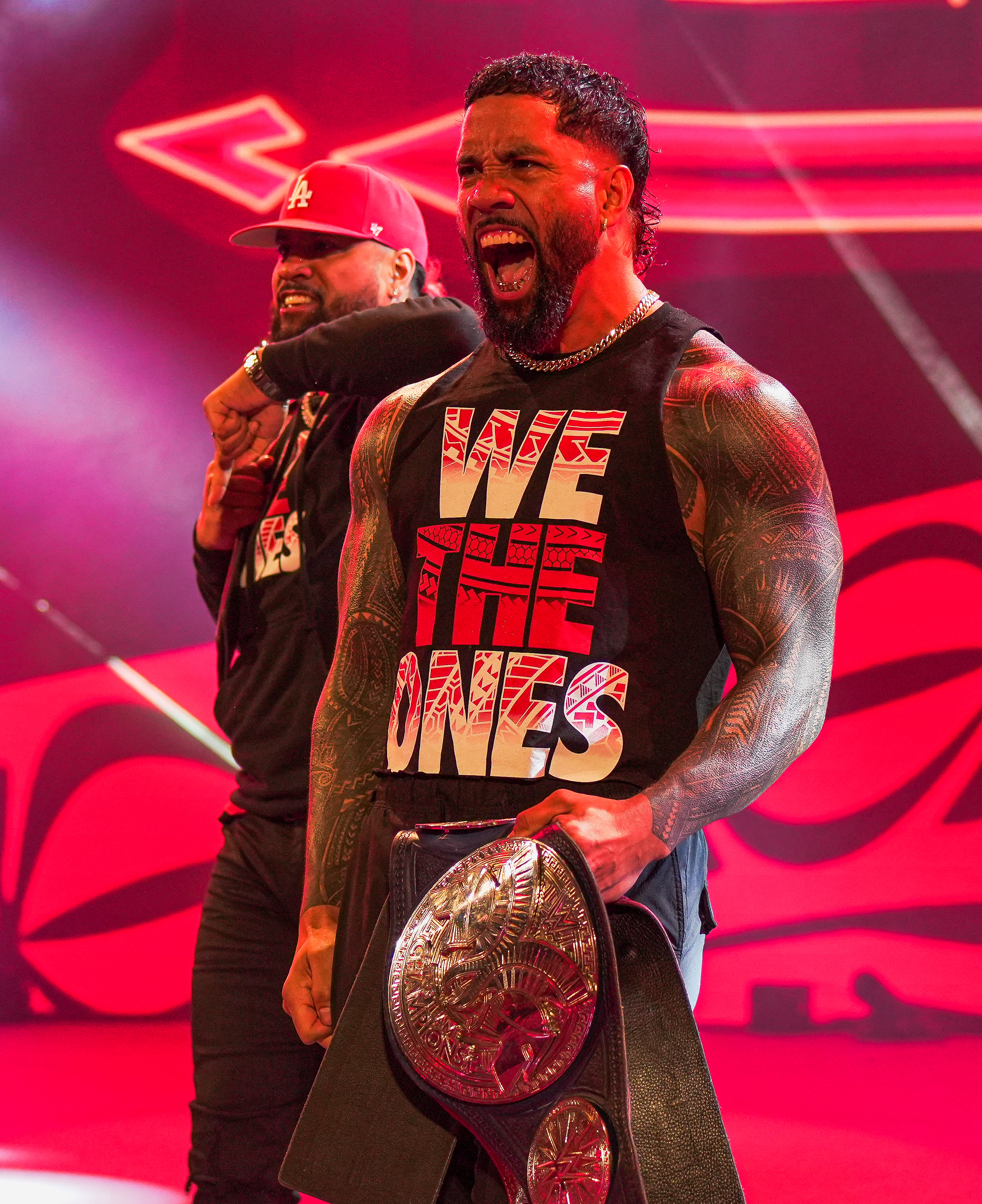
- The Usos (Jimmy Uso on left, Jey Uso on right) as Undisputed WWE Tag Team Champions in 2023.

Tag team
- Name(s): The Usos Brothers; The Samoan Soldiers; The Usos; The Uso Brothers
- Members: Jey Uso; Jimmy Uso
- Billed heights: Jey Uso: 6 ft 2 in (1.88 m); Jimmy Uso: 6 ft 3 in (1.91 m)
- Combined billed weight: 493 lb (224 kg)
- Billed from: San Francisco, California
- Debut: June 8, 2007
- Years active: 2007–2023; 2025–present
- Trained by: Rikishi; Booker T

The Usos are an American professional wrestling tag team which consists of twin brothers Jey Uso and Jimmy Uso. They are signed to WWE, where they perform on the Raw brand as a sub-unit of The Bloodline stable. They are the former four-time World Tag Team Champions and former five-time SmackDown Tag Team Champions, making their team overall nine-time champions and holding the record for the longest male tag team championship reign in WWE history at 622 days.

Trained since childhood by their father, WWE Hall of Famer Rikishi, the twin brothers Joshua and Jonathan debuted in WWE's then-developmental territory Florida Championship Wrestling (FCW) in 2009, where they became FCW Florida Tag Team Champions, and wrestled as Jules Uso and Jimmy Uso (The Uso Brothers). They were moved to the main roster the following year. While on the main roster, they have been managed by their cousin Tamina Snuka and Jimmy's wife, Naomi. From July 2021 to June 2023, they were part of The Bloodline stable with their real-life first cousin once removed and group leader Roman Reigns and younger brother Solo Sikoa. Jimmy left the group in June 2023, with Jey following suit two weeks later; only for Jimmy to rejoin the group in September of that year until he was excommunicated in April 2024, and was subsequently replaced by Tama Tonga; they would reunite with Reigns in April 2026.

Peers and critics have described the Usos as one of WWE's greatest professional wrestling tag teams of all time. They hold the record for the longest male tag team championship reign in WWE history at 622 days, which was accomplished in their fifth reign with the WWE SmackDown Tag Team Championship. They are overall nine-time tag team champions in WWE, capturing the WWE Raw Tag Team Championship three times and winning the Slammy Award for Tag Team of the Year in both 2014 and 2015. In 2017, they won the SmackDown Tag Team Championship on three occasions, followed by a fourth reign in 2019 and a fifth reign in 2021, and a World Tag Team Championship reign in 2025. They are the first team to win both the Raw and SmackDown Tag Team Championships and the first team to hold them simultaneously as the Undisputed WWE Tag Team Championship. In addition, The Usos have competed in the main event of several pay-per-views, including WrestleMania 39 - Night 1, which was the first time a tag team championship was defended in the main event of a WrestleMania, and the second time that a tag team match was the main event of WrestleMania.

== Early lives ==
Joshua Samuel Fatu (Jey) and Jonathan Solofa Fatu(Jimmy) were born in San Francisco, California on August 22, 1985 (Jimmy is the older twin by nine minutes), the sons of Talisua Fuavai and professional wrestler Rikishi. They have six brothers and a sister, including Solo Sikoa. The Fatu brothers are of Samoan descent. As the sons of WWE Hall of Famer Rikishi, they are also part of the Anoaʻi family; they are first cousins once-removed from former WWE performer Afa Anoaʻi Jr. The brothers attended Escambia High School in Pensacola, Florida, where they played competitive football. They continued their football careers at University of West Alabama, where they both played linebacker. Jonathan played one season (2003), while Joshua played from 2003 to 2005. On the January 26, 2007 episode of WWE SmackDown, Jon wrestled under the name "Jon Robinson" teaming with Adam Evans in a losing effort to Deuce 'n Domino.

== Professional wrestling career ==
=== Early career (2008–2009) ===
On December 12, 2008, the brothers made their professional wrestling debut as the Samoan Soldiers, at the NWA Prime Time event, defeating Killer Instinct (Jake Slater and Mike Stratus). In 2009, they worked in Texas.

=== World Wrestling Entertainment/WWE ===
==== Florida Championship Wrestling (2010) ====
The Uso Brothers debuted in Florida Championship wrestling in January 2010, by defeating The Rotundo Brothers (Duke and Bo) on January 14. In a clash of the generational wrestlers on February 18, The Rotundo Brothers teamed up with Wes Brisco to defeat The Usos and Donny Marlow. They continued their association with Marlow at the television tapings on February 25, when he accompanied them to ringside for a victory against Titus O'Neil and Big E Langston. In March, they were joined by Sarona Snuka, who began acting as their manager and on March 13, The Usos defeated The Fortunate Sons (Joe Hennig and Brett DiBiase) to win the FCW Florida Tag Team Championship. They made their first title defense at the March 18 television tapings by defeating The Dudebusters (Trent Baretta and Caylen Croft) to retain. They went on to successfully defend the championship against Percy Watson and Darren Young, Hunico and Tito Nieves, Skip Sheffield and Darren Young, and The Dudebusters, who they defeated by disqualification when Tamina pulled the referee out of the ring to stop him from counting the pinfall. On June 3, The Usos lost the Florida Tag Team Championship to "Los Aviadores" (Hunico and Dos Equis).

==== Main roster debut and first feuds (2010–2013) ====
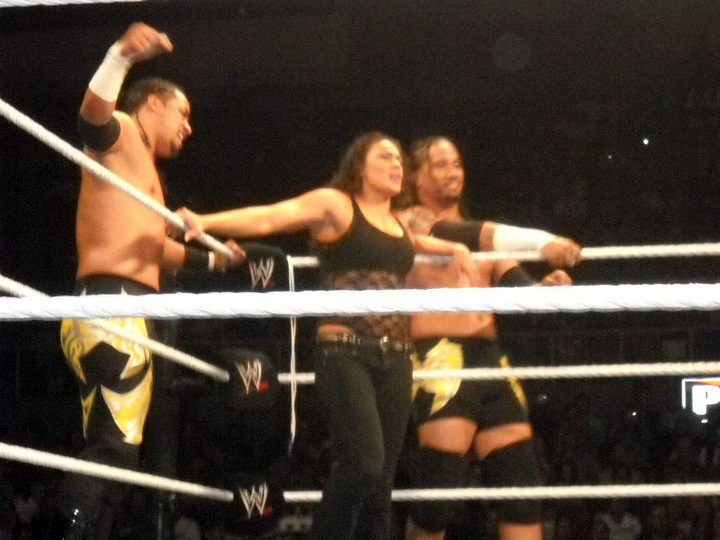
The Usos with Tamina in September 2010

On the May 24, 2010, episode of Raw, The Usos (with Jules now wrestling as Jey Uso) and Tamina made their debut as heels by attacking the Unified WWE Tag Team Champions, The Hart Dynasty (Tyson Kidd, David Hart Smith, and Natalya). They feuded with the champions, wrestling for the titles at the Money in the Bank and Night of Champions, but didn't win the titles. On the December 6 episode of Raw, The Usos were in a fatal four-way tag match and were eliminated, but Tamina stayed in the corner of Marella and Kozlov upon their winning of the WWE Tag Team Championship; as a result, she turned face and left The Usos.

On April 26, 2011, both Usos were drafted to the SmackDown brand as part of the 2011 Supplemental Draft. On the June 2 episode of Superstars, The Usos turned face when they competed against The Corre (Justin Gabriel and Heath Slater) in a losing effort. Throughout June 2011, The Usos continuous to complete victories with Gabriel and Slater in tag team matches, while managing to defeat them in two six-man tag matches while partnering once with Ezekiel Jackson and once with Trent Barreta. The Usos began performing the Siva Tau, a traditional Samoan war dance, as part of their ring entrance, using the dance to display their strength and energize themselves. They performed this entrance until they turned heel on September 6, 2016 on Friday Night Smackdown. On the July 29 episode of SmackDown, The Usos challenged David Otunga and Michael McGillicutty for the WWE Tag Team Titles, but were defeated.

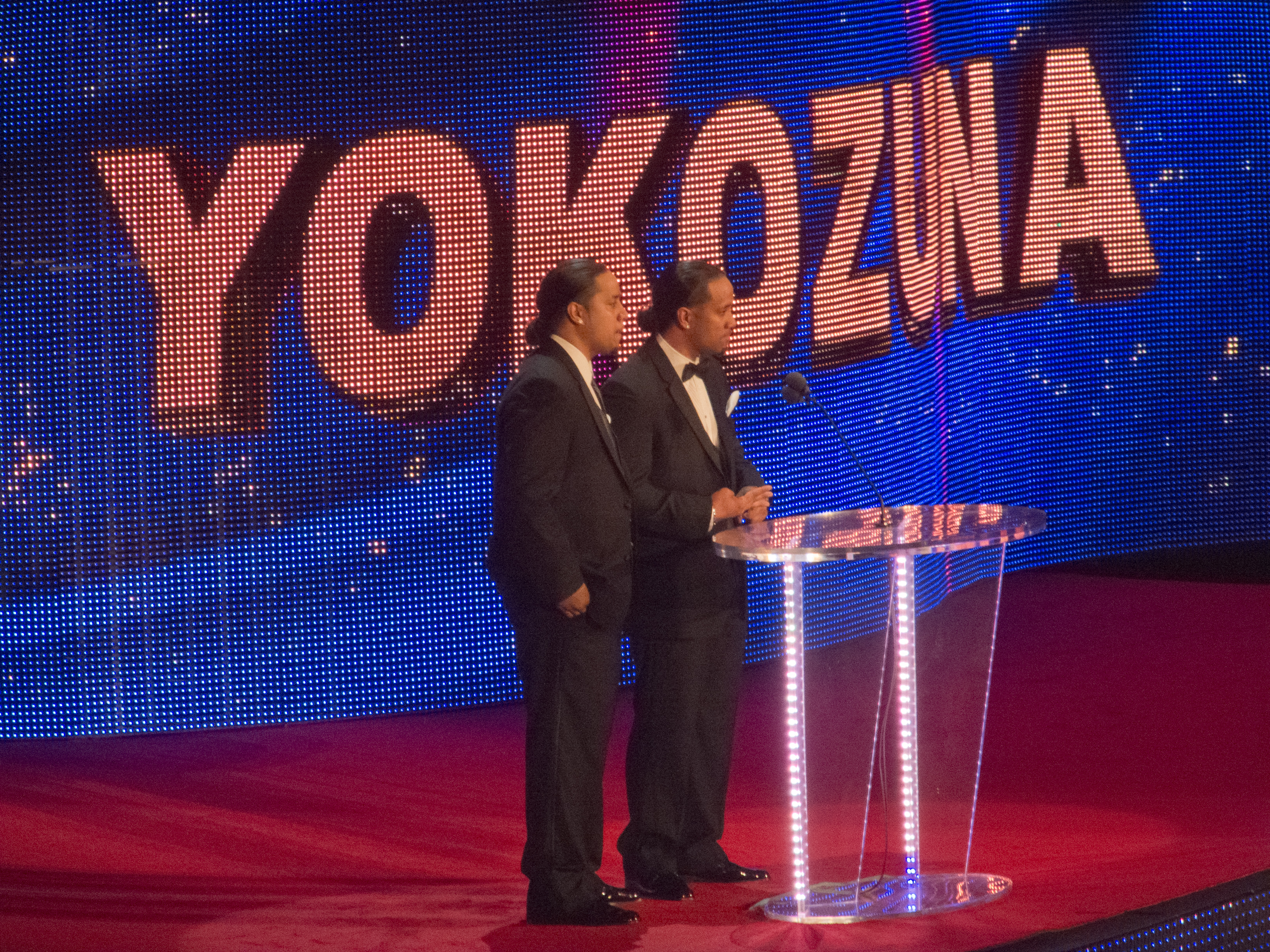
The Usos at the 2012 WWE Hall of Fame ceremony inducting their cousin Yokozuna

The Usos then began appearing on the fifth season of NXT in September 2011, by delivering post-match attacks on the team of Darren Young and JTG. The Usos then went on to defeat Young and JTG on the September 27 episode of NXT Redemption. However, just like how The Usos debuted on NXT, they were attacked after their win by another debuting tag team, Curt Hawkins and Tyler Reks, and The Usos were defeated by Hawkins and Reks the next week. In the following months and into 2012, The Usos exchanged wins with Hawkins and Reks on NXT, while continually losing to Primo and Epico on SmackDown. They also feuded with JTG, who had become Tamina's boyfriend. In March 2012, The Usos began a feud with Darren Young and Titus O'Neil, after they mocked The Usos' pre-match Siva Tau. Although The Usos beat Young and O'Neil in tag team matches, they were continually defeated in singles matches. On the final episode of the fifth season of NXT on June 13, The Usos defeated Johnny Curtis and Michael McGillicutty.

The Usos then started a feud with The Ascension (Conor O'Brian and Kenneth Cameron) on the August 15 episode of NXT, with a match between the two tag teams ending in the Ascension being disqualified; the Ascension then conducted a post-match attack on The Usos. On the August 29 episode of NXT, The Usos called out the Ascension, but the Ascension ambushed The Usos and again delivered a beatdown. On the September 5 episode of NXT, the Ascension defeated The Usos. The Usos then teamed with Richie Steamboat to lose to The Ascension and Kassius Ohno on the October 17 episode of NXT. The Usos' feud with the Ascension was cut short when Cameron was released from WWE.

At WrestleMania XXVIII, The Usos unsuccessfully challenged for the WWE Tag Team Championship in a triple threat dark match against champions Primo and Epico and Tyson Kidd and Justin Gabriel when the defending champions retained their titles. At No Way Out, The Usos competed with Primo and Epico, Justin Gabriel and Tyson Kidd, and The Prime Time Players in a Fatal-4-Way Tag Team match to determine the Number 1 contenders for the WWE Tag Team Champions and were unsuccessful. On the July 16 episode of Raw, The Usos made an appearance dancing with their father, Rikishi, after Rikishi made a "Blast from the Past" return defeating Heath Slater. On the September 7 episode of SmackDown, The Usos were unsuccessful in winning a Triple Threat Tag Team match for No# 1 contendership for the WWE Tag Team titles against The Prime Time Players, and Primo and Epico.

==== WWE Tag Team Champions (2013–2015) ====
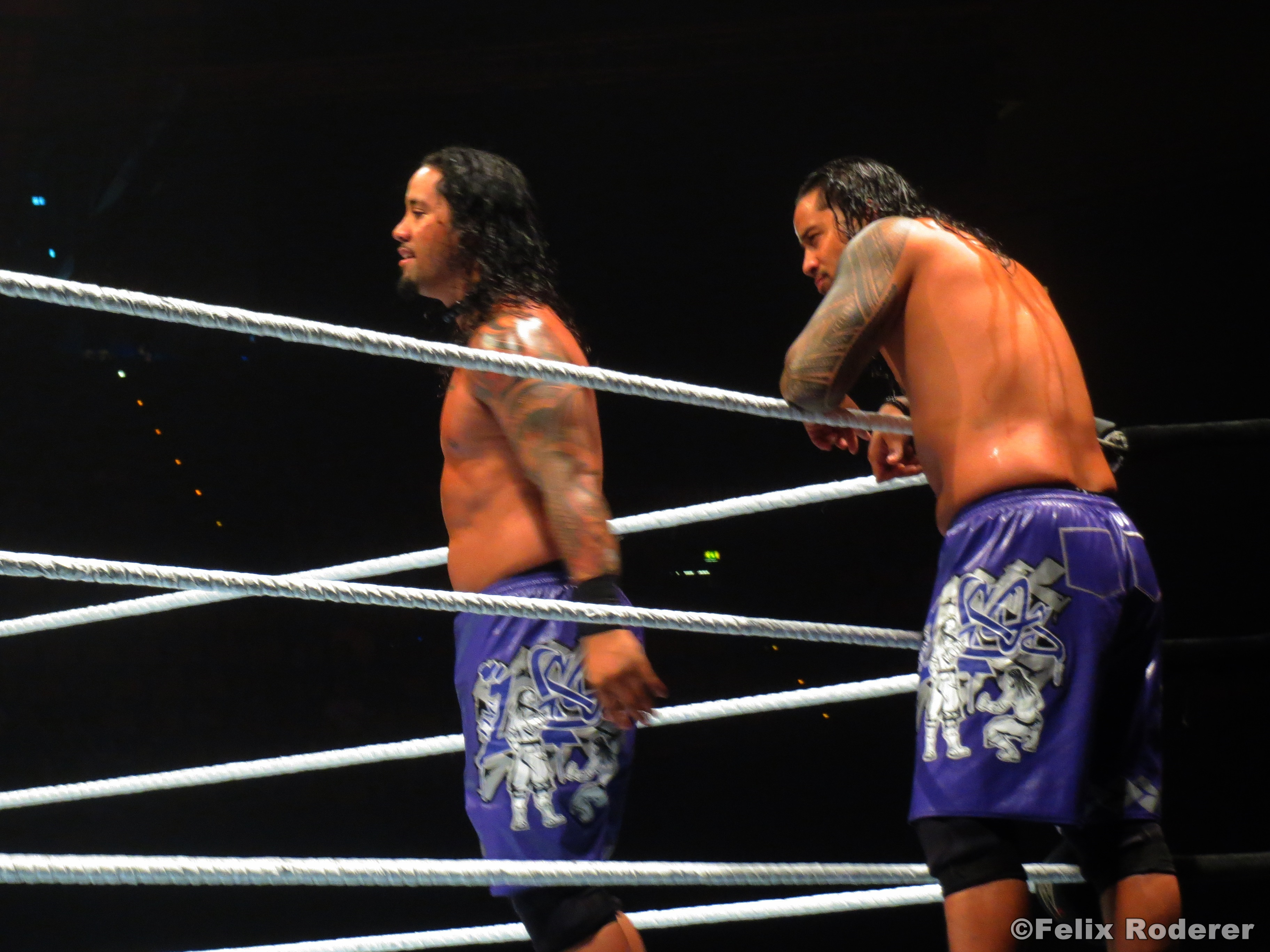
The Usos in November 2013

On the June 3 episode of Raw, The Usos began to use face paint similar to their deceased uncle Eddie Fatu, also known as Umaga, as a means of further highlighting their Samoan culture. During the following months, they competed for The Shield's WWE Tag Team Championship. At Money in the Bank The Usos challenged Rollins and Reigns for the titles, but were unsuccessful and participated in a triple-threat tag team match against the team of Cody Rhodes and Goldust and The Shield at the Hell in a Cell pay per view, which they failed to win.

The Usos were involved in the traditional Survivor Series elimination match at Survivor Series, teaming with Rey Mysterio, Cody Rhodes and Goldust in a losing effort against The Real Americans and The Shield. After a brief feud against The Wyatt Family, at the beginning of 2014, The Usos would go on a winning streak and began to demand a Tag Team Championship match from The New Age Outlaws. They received a tag title shot at the Elimination Chamber PPV against the Outlaws but were once again unsuccessful, but they won the titles on the March 3 episode of Raw. On the WrestleMania XXX pre-show, The Usos successfully defended their titles in a Fatal Four Way Elimination match against Ryback and Curtis Axel, The Real Americans, and Los Matadores. The Usos then resumed a rivalry with The Wyatt Family, successfully retaining the championships against Harper and Rowan at Money in the Bank and Battleground. The Usos then dropped the titles to Goldust and Stardust at Night of Champions, ending their reign at 202 days.

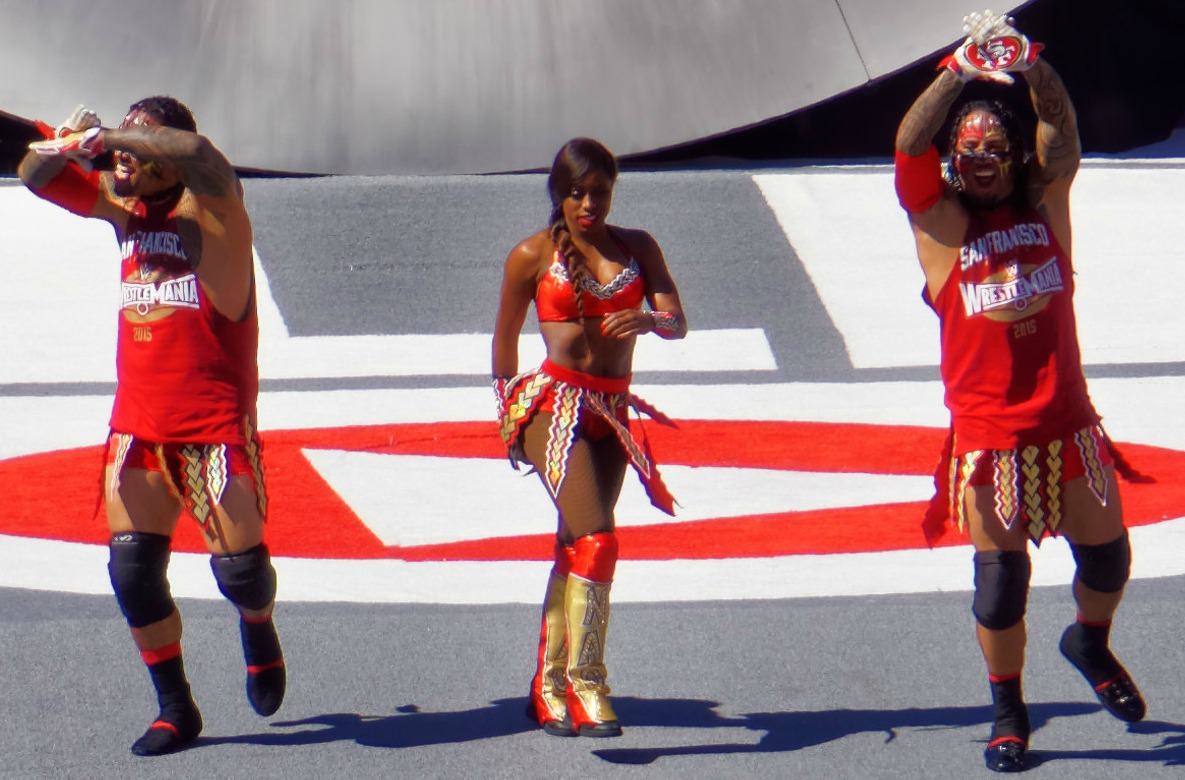
The Usos with Naomi making their entrance to the ring at the WrestleMania 31 pre-show in March 2015

On the December 29 edition of Raw, The Usos recaptured the titles from The Miz and Damien Mizdow after feuding with them over Naomi's entertainment opportunities. However, they lost the titles at Fastlane against Tyson Kidd and Cesaro. Despite getting a rematch the next night on Raw, The Usos did not regain the titles due to Natalya interfering for a DQ win. At the March 9 SmackDown tapings, Jey Uso suffered a legitimate shoulder injury. On the WrestleMania 31 pre-show, they competed in the fatal-four-way tag team match in which they lost and Jey further injuring his shoulder.

After Jey Uso suffered an anterior shoulder dislocation on the left arm, he remained off WWE television for about six months. On the April 18 episode of Main Event, Jimmy Uso defeated Xavier Woods. Jimmy performed commentary while Jey was out with the injury. On the May 12 episode of Main Event, Jimmy Uso teamed with Zack Ryder to face Luke Harper and Erick Rowan in a losing effort. Jimmy Uso returned to action on the September 10 episode of SmackDown, teaming with Roman Reigns and Dean Ambrose in a six-man tag team against The New Day (Big E, Kofi Kingston and Xavier Woods). They won via disqualification after Jimmy was attacked by The Wyatt Family (Bray Wyatt, Braun Strowman and Luke Harper).

Jey Uso returned on the November 2 episode of Raw alongside his brother Jimmy as a surprise return to team up with their cousin Roman Reigns, Dean Ambrose and Ryback against Seth Rollins, Kevin Owens and The New Day in a Survivor Series elimination tag team match, The Usos along with Reigns, Ambrose and Ryback were victorious in the match. On the November 30 episode of Raw, The Usos competed in a tag team #1 contenders match against Lucha Dragons, which ended in a double disqualification when The New Day attacked both teams. Later that night, Stephanie McMahon told The Usos that they would be inserted to the tag team championship match at the TLC pay-per-view if Roman Reigns defeated Sheamus during the main event of the show in 5 minutes and 15 seconds, which he won by disqualification. At TLC, The Usos competed in a losing effort. The Usos won a Slammy Award on the December 21 episode of Raw for "Tag Team of the year".

==== SmackDown Tag Team Champions (2016–2019) ====
At the Royal Rumble, The Usos unsuccessfully challenged The New Day for the WWE Tag Team Championship. In February, The Usos entered a feud with the Dudley Boyz after they put The Usos through tables after defeating The New Day and Mark Henry in an 8-man Tag team Tables match. On the WrestleMania 32 kickoff show, The Usos defeated The Dudley Boyz, but the next night on Raw, they were defeated by the Dudleys in tables match. On the April 11 episode of Raw, The Usos defeated The Social Outcasts in the first round of a tag team tournament. Following the match, they were attacked by Luke Gallows and Karl Anderson. The following week on Raw, The Usos lost to The Vaudevillains in the semi-final round. On the May 2 episode of Raw, The Usos and Roman Reigns were defeated by AJ Styles, Gallows and Anderson in a six-man tag team match when Styles pinned Jey Uso. At Extreme Rules, The Usos were defeated by Gallows and Anderson in a Texas Tornado match. Later that night, they helped Roman Reigns retain his title in the main event.

On July 19, at the 2016 WWE draft, The Usos were drafted to SmackDown working on both the Battleground and SummerSlam pre-shows. Then, they entered an 8 tag team tournament to determine the inaugural holders of the WWE SmackDown Tag Team Championship. On the September 6 episode of SmackDown, The Usos turned heel for the first time since 2011 when they attacked American Alpha after losing to them in 28 seconds in the semi-finals. At Backlash, The Usos defeated the Hype Bros before facing Heath Slater and Rhyno in the tournament finals, but were defeated. The Usos faced the new champions at No Mercy, where they were defeated again. As part of their heel turn, they began a street-like, thuggish gimmick. The Usos participated in a 5–on–5 Survivor Series Tag Team Elimination match at Survivor Series, where they lost to Cesaro and Sheamus of Team Raw. The Usos would reignite their feud with American Alpha following the Elimination Chamber after they attacked American Alpha.

On the March 21, 2017, episode of SmackDown, The Usos defeated American Alpha to win the SmackDown Tag Team Championship, becoming the first team to have won both the Raw (formerly WWE Tag Team Championship) and SmackDown Tag Team Championship. On the April 11 episode of SmackDown Live, The Usos were successful in their first title defense by defeating American Alpha in a rematch, ending the feud. They retained the titles at Backlash against Breezango (Tyler Breeze and Fandango) and Money in the Bank against The New Day, but lost them at Battleground, ending their 124-day reign. On August 20 at the SummerSlam pre-show, The Usos defeated The New Day to recapture the titles. Their reign ended on the September 12 episode of SmackDown Live after they lost to The New Day in a Sin City Street Fight, but regained at Hell in a Cell. On the October 10 episode of SmackDown Live, The Usos claimed that they had respect for The New Day, turning into fan favorites again.

At Survivor Series, they defeated Raw Tag Team Champions Cesaro and Sheamus in an interbrand Champion vs Champion match. At Clash of Champions, The Usos retained the title in a fatal four-way tag team match against Chad Gable and Shelton Benjamin, The New Day (Big E and Kofi Kingston) and Rusev and Aiden English. At Royal Rumble, The Usos retained the titles against Gable and Benjamin in a two out of three falls match, winning 2–0. They would renew their rivalry with the New Day, culminating in a title match at Fastlane, which would end in a no-contest due to interference from The Bludgeon Brothers. At WrestleMania 34, The Usos wrestled on the main card of WrestleMania for the first time, where they defended the titles against The New Day and The Bludgeon Brothers in a triple threat tag team match, but The Usos dropped the belts to The Bludgeon Brothers after Harper pinned Kofi Kingston. This ended their reign at 182 days, setting a record for the longest SmackDown Tag Team Championship reign. On the SmackDown after WrestleMania, The Usos would defeat the New Day to earn a rematch against the Bludgeon Brothers for the WWE SmackDown Tag Team Championship at the Greatest Royal Rumble. At the event on April 27, The Usos were defeated when Rowan pinned Jey Uso.

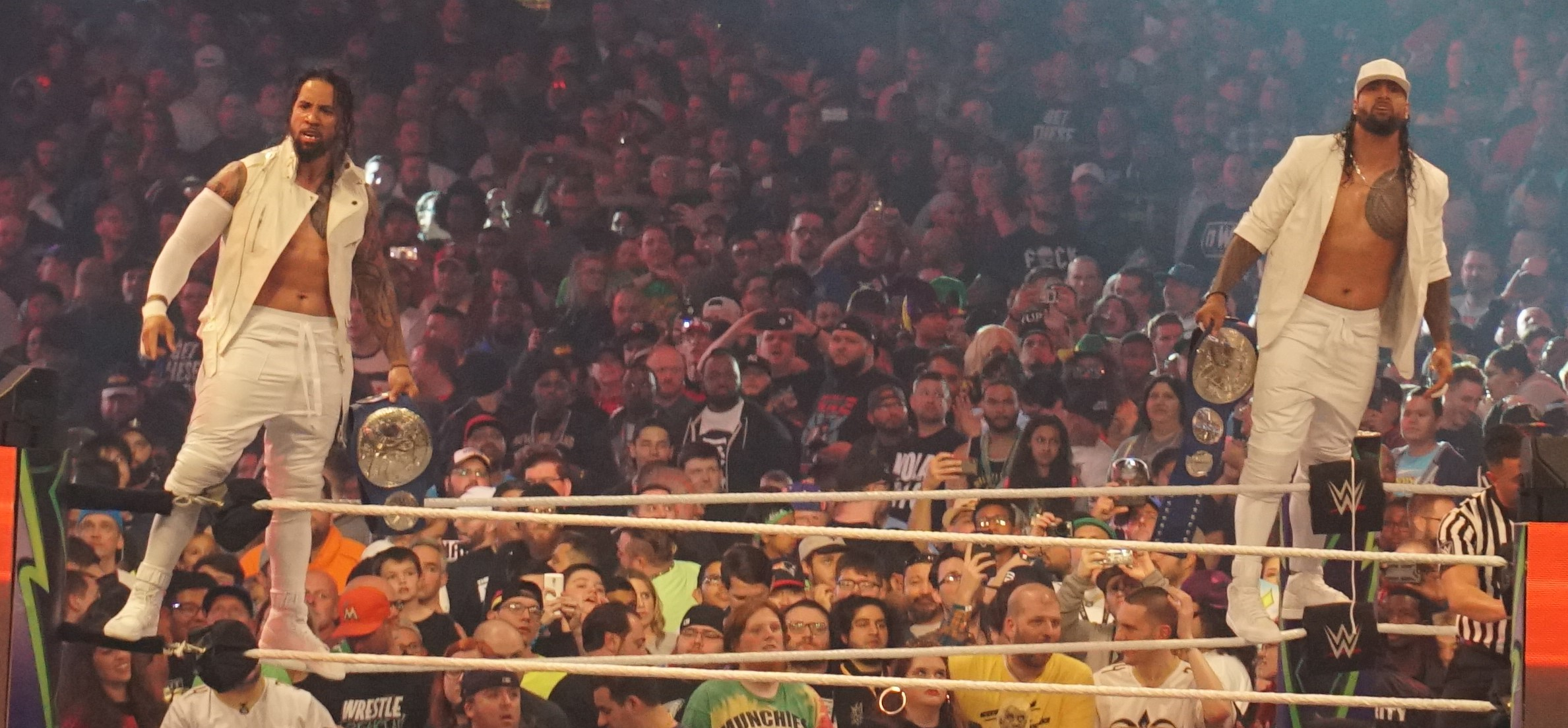
The Usos as SmackDown Tag Team Champions at WrestleMania 34

On the May 22 episode of SmackDown, The Usos attempted to earn another title match at Money in the Bank, but were defeated by Luke Gallows and Karl Anderson. Following the loss, The Usos began failing to earn numerous title opportunities, including a tag team match against a returning Team Hell No (Daniel Bryan and Kane) on the July 3 episode of SmackDown and losing in the first round of a number one contender's tournament to The Bar (Cesaro and Sheamus) on the July 31 episode of SmackDown. After months of treading in the division, The Usos began to build momentum, starting with Survivor Series, where they, as Team SmackDown's captains, emerged from the 10-on-10 Survivor Series match as the sole survivors, giving SmackDown their only win over Raw. They would go on to challenge The Bar for the SmackDown Tag Team Championship in a triple threat match, which also included the New Day at TLC, but failed to capture the titles.

On the January 29, 2019, episode of SmackDown, they defeated The Bar, The New Day and new SmackDown tag team Heavy Machinery (Otis and Tucker) to get a SmackDown Tag Team Championship match at Elimination Chamber, where they defeated Shane McMahon and The Miz, winning the titles for a record fourth time. On the March 26 episode of SmackDown, The Usos were a part of a tag team gauntlet match in which they forfeited to former longtime rivals the New Day as a show of respect and to help Kofi Kingston earn a WWE Championship match at WrestleMania. As a storyline punishment for their deed, they were scheduled to defend the titles against The Bar, Aleister Black and Ricochet, and Shinsuke Nakamura and Rusev in a Fatal 4-Way at WrestleMania 35, where they would retain. Two days later, on the April 9 episode of SmackDown, The Usos lost the titles to Hardy Boyz.

As part of the 2019 WWE Superstar Shake-up, The Usos were drafted to the Raw brand. They entered a feud with The Revival (Dash Wilder and Scott Dawson) on Raw, while also entering a feud with Daniel Bryan and Rowan on SmackDown, thanks to WWE's new Wild Card Rule. On the May 7 episode of SmackDown Live, they failed to regain the SmackDown Tag Team Championship from Bryan and Rowan. At Money in the Bank, they defeated Bryan and Rowan in a non-title match. They proceed their feud with The Revival, where the two team would be trading wins with one another. On the June 10 episode of Raw, both The Usos and The Revival competed in a triple threat match for the Raw Tag Team Championship against champions Curt Hawkins and Zack Ryder, which The Revival won. At Extreme Rules, The Usos challenged The Revival for the titles, where they were unsuccessful. Following Jimmy's arrest for DUI, the duo would be off television for the remainder of the calendar year.

==== The Bloodline (2020–2023) ====
On the January 3, 2020 episode of SmackDown, The Usos made a surprise return once again as part of the SmackDown brand, aiding Roman Reigns from an attack by King Corbin and Dolph Ziggler. The Usos then challenged for the SmackDown Tag Team Championship at Elimination Chamber and WrestleMania 36, where they were unsuccessful again. During the match at WrestleMania, Jimmy suffered a legitimate knee injury, putting him out of in-ring action indefinitely.

On the September 4 episode of SmackDown, after Big E was attacked and injured in a storyline, Jey took Big E's place in a fatal 4-way match against Matt Riddle, King Corbin, and Sheamus where the winner would earn a Universal Championship match at Clash of Champions against Roman Reigns, who turned heel recently. Jey won by pinning Riddle to earn the first singles championship opportunity of his career. He was defeated at Clash of Champions when Jimmy appeared and threw in a towel on Jey's behalf. Jey then received a rematch at Hell in a Cell in an "I Quit" Hell in a Cell match but lost again. After Hell in a Cell, Jey aligned with Roman Reigns, thus turning heel in the process. On the April 9, 2021, special WrestleMania edition of SmackDown, Jey won the Andre the Giant Memorial Battle Royal. This marked Jey's first major singles accolade in WWE.

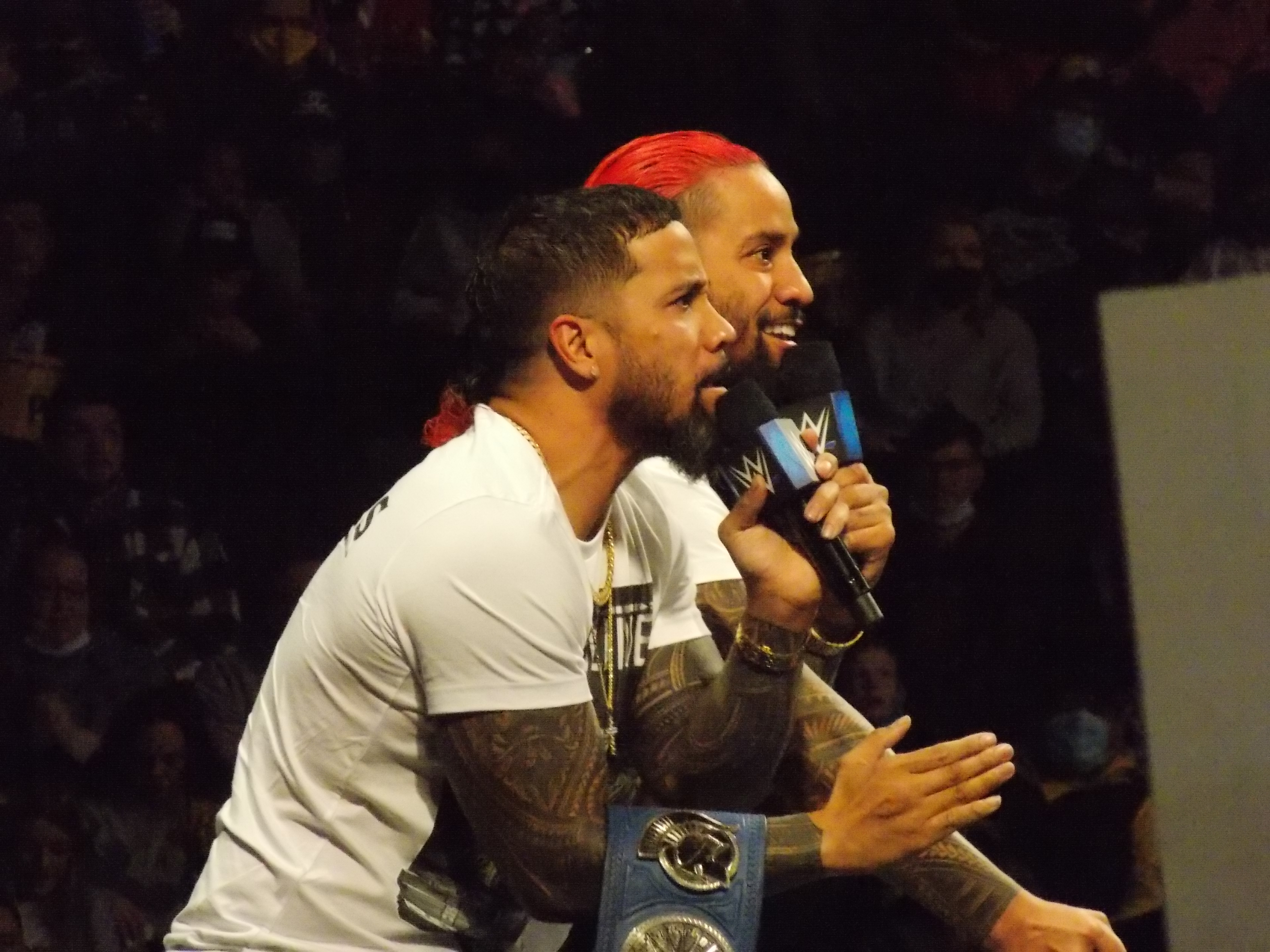
The Usos in 2022

After Jimmy returned from injury on the May 7 episode of SmackDown, there was an initial strife between The Usos and Reigns before they all reconciled and formed a faction, with Jimmy turning heel in the process. During the Money in the Bank Kickoff pre-show on July 18, The Usos were successful in capturing their fifth SmackDown Tag Team Championship from The Mysterios (composed of Rey and Dominik Mysterio). At SummerSlam, The Usos would defeat The Mysterios in a rematch to retain the titles.

On January 16, 2022, they broke their previous record of 182 days as longest reigning SmackDown Tag Team Champions. At WrestleMania 38, The Usos defeated Shinsuke Nakamura and Rick Boogs to retain their championship. At WrestleMania Backlash, The Usos and Reigns defeated RK-Bro (Randy Orton and Riddle) and Drew McIntyre in a six-man tag team match. On the May 20 episode of SmackDown, they, with outside interference from Reigns, defeated RK-Bro to win the Raw Tag Team Championship, becoming the Undisputed WWE Tag Team Champions. This gave The Usos their third reign as Raw Tag Team Champions (and first reign with the title since 2014) and made them the first team to hold the Raw and SmackDown titles simultaneously. At Money in the Bank, The Usos retained their undisputed titles against The Street Profits in controversial fashion, with The Usos winning by pinfall despite Montez Ford's shoulder being off the mat. A rematch between the teams was scheduled for SummerSlam with a special guest referee, later revealed to be Jeff Jarrett.

On July 18, The Usos surpassed the 365-day mark as SmackDown Tag Team Champions, becoming the first team to hold the titles for a continuous reign of one full year. At SummerSlam, The Usos successfully retained against The Street Profits. At Crown Jewel on November 5, The Usos successfully retained the titles against The Brawling Brutes (Butch and Ridge Holland). On the November 11 episode of SmackDown, they retained their championships against The New Day (Kofi Kingston and Xavier Woods), thus ensuring that they would become the longest reigning male tag team champions on WWE's main roster, a record previously set by The New Day at 483 days. On November 14, 2022, The Usos officially broke The New Day's record for main roster tag team championships, and then on November 28, they broke Gallus' record of 497 days with the NXT UK Tag Team Championship to become the longest reigning male tag team champions in WWE history, regardless of championship or roster status. At Survivor Series WarGames on November 26, The Bloodline (The Usos, Roman Reigns, Solo Sikoa and Sami Zayn) defeated The Brawling Brutes, Drew McIntyre and Kevin Owens in a WarGames match.

==== Breakup and feud (2023–2024) ====
Tensions between The Usos and Zayn resurfaced in subsequent weeks. After Reigns retained the Undisputed WWE Universal Championship at the Royal Rumble against Kevin Owens, The Usos proceeded to beat down Owens and handcuff him to the ring ropes. After refusing to hit Owens, Zayn then hit Owens with a steel chair, turning heel. Jimmy, Sikoa and Reigns, Zayn when Jey looked on and eventually left the ring in disgust. After the event, Jey declared on Instagram that "he's out" and did not appear on the following episode of SmackDown. Jey would show up on the February 10 episode of SmackDown to retain the SmackDown Tag Team Championship with Jimmy against Braun Strowman and Ricochet. Before the episode ended, Reigns, through Heyman, informed The Usos to stay at home for the following week's episode of SmackDown and Elimination Chamber in Canada. This was meant to write off The Usos as they may not be able to enter Canada due to their DUI history, where DUI charges are taken more seriously there. However, Jimmy would be present for the event to assist Reigns in retaining his championship, and Jey would show up to prevent Reigns from hitting Zayn with a chair, which failed.

On the March 6 episode of Raw, Jey showed up in the crowd during Jimmy's match against Zayn which Jimmy lost. Following the match, Jey hugged Zayn the latter, affirming Jey's allegiance to The Bloodline. The Usos and Sikoa then attacked Zayn before Cody Rhodes ran out to save Zayn. On the March 20 episode of Raw, a reunited Owens and Zayn challenged The Usos for the Undisputed WWE Tag Team Championship at WrestleMania 39, which The Usos accepted. On night one of the event on April 1, The Usos main evented WrestleMania for the first time in their careers, where they lost the titles to Owens and Zayn, thus ending their Raw reign at 316 days and their record SmackDown reign at 622 days. This match also marked the first time a tag team match main evented WrestleMania since its inaugural show. Following their loss, Reigns started ignoring them and depending on Sikoa instead, with Reigns inserting himself and Sikoa into a title match at Night of Champions. They failed to capture the Undisputed WWE Tag Team Championships in their rematch against Owens and Zayn on the April 28 episode of SmackDown.

At Night of Champions, Jimmy turned face after he and Jey cost Reigns and Sikoa the match for the Undisputed WWE Tag Team Championships, with Jimmy superkicking Reigns for mistreating them. Jimmy was officially excommunicated from The Bloodline for his actions at Night of Champions on the June 2 episode of SmackDown during Reigns' 1,000 days Universal Champion celebration. On the June 9 episode of SmackDown, Jey was given a United States Championship opportunity against Austin Theory by Heyman to entice him to leave Jimmy, but lost the match after Jimmy while saving Jey from Pretty Deadly, mistakenly attacked Jey while aiming for Sikoa who tried to attack Jimmy. On the following week's episode of SmackDown, Jey decided to side with Jimmy and left The Bloodline by kicking Reigns, turning face in the process. The Usos then superkicked both Sikoa and Reigns. At Money in the Bank, The Usos defeated Reigns and Sikoa in a "Bloodline Civil War" tag team match with Jey pinning Reigns. This is Reigns' first direct pinfall loss since December 2019 at TLC: Tables, Ladders & Chairs. At SummerSlam, Jimmy appeared to have turned on Jey by pulling him out of the ring while he was trying to pin Reigns and superkicked him, allowing Reigns to defeat Jey. However, on the August 11 episode of SmackDown, he explained that the reason for his actions was out of fear that if Jey had become the new Tribal Chief, the power would have corrupted him. Jey responded by superkicking Reigns, Sikoa, and finally Jimmy. Afterwards, he declared that he was quitting WWE. A few weeks later, Jimmy returned on the September 1 episode of SmackDown with a new theme song, while Jey moved to Raw the next night at Payback with the remixed version of its former entrance theme, thus disbanding The Usos.

After disbanding, the brothers began a long, intense feud. After Jey won the Undisputed Tag Team Championships with Cody Rhodes at Fastlane, they went on to retain their titles against Kevin Owens and Sami Zayn and Austin Theory and Grayson Waller on the following week's episodes of Raw and SmackDown, with the latter being known as Jey and Rhodes confronted Jimmy and Sikoa after Roman Reigns' entrance music plays in a faceoff. However, they lost the titles back to Bálor and Priest in a rematch on the October 16 episode of Raw thanks to interference from Jimmy and Drew McIntyre, ending their reign at 9 days. This, however, gave Jey the distinction of holding the SmackDown Tag Team Championship for the most cumulative days across his six reigns at 1,011 days (1,010 days as recognized by WWE). After Jimmy attempted to attack John Cena with Solo Sikoa on the October 20 episode of SmackDown, the hooded figure, a similar tactic that happened in SummerSlam, who pulled Jimmy, was revealed to be Jey. They brawled each other before Jey was given a fine by SmackDown General Manager Nick Aldis and was ejected from the arena along with Raw General Manager Adam Pearce. At Royal Rumble, on January 27, 2024, The Usos faced each other for the first time in the Royal Rumble match, with Jey and Jimmy being the first and second entrants respectively.

On the February 19 episode of Raw, Jimmy cause Jey a match for the Intercontinental Championship and attacked him after the match. Fed up with his brother's actions, Jey challenged Jimmy to a match at WrestleMania XL on the March 11 episode of Raw, which Jimmy accepted on that week's SmackDown. At Night 1 of Wrestlemania XL, Jey defeated Jimmy after Jimmy had pretended to apologize to Jey for his actions, in which Jey initially accepted which led to the brothers hugging in the ring during the match before Jimmy superkicked Jey, deceiving him in the process and trying to win the match for himself, but being unsuccessful in doing so. On the following episode of SmackDown, Jimmy was exiled from The Bloodline once more after he was attacked by the debuting Tama Tonga, which would allow Jimmy to recover from his injury.

==== Sporadic reunions (2024–2025) ====
On the October 14 episode of Raw, Jimmy attempted to make amends with Jey, but was pushed away. On the October 25 episode of SmackDown, Jey assisted Jimmy and Reigns in taking out The Bloodline - now led by Sikoa who consisted of Jacob Fatu, Tama Tonga and Tonga Loa, the brothers then embraced in the ring, reuniting The Usos. On the November 1 episode of SmackDown, Jey agreed to team with Reigns and Jimmy against The Bloodline at Crown Jewel. At Crown Jewel on November 2, The Usos and Reigns lost to Sikoa, Tonga and Fatu in a Six-Man Tag Team match with Reigns being pinned by Sikoa. Despite the reunion, the twins maintained their separate identities and entrance themes. At Survivor Series: WarGames on November 30, Jey, Jimmy, Reigns, Sami Zayn and CM Punk defeated The Bloodline and Bronson Reed in a WarGames match. On the January 3 episode of SmackDown, Jey and Jimmy teamed with Sami Zayn in a losing bout against The Bloodline. On the March 24 episode of Raw, in Glasgow, Scotland, Jimmy and Jey briefly reunited for the first time since Money in the Bank in July 2023 in a match against A-Town Down Under, which they won.

On the September 1 edition of Raw after Clash in Paris, Jimmy saved his brother Jey from the beatdown at the hands of Bron Breakker and Bronson Reed, part of The Vision stable after their win over Jey and LA Knight. The following week, The Usos formally reunited setting up a tag team match against Reed and Breakker at Wrestlepalooza, marking their first match as a tag team since the March 24, 2025 episode of Raw, and their first match on pay-per-view as a team since the 2023 Money in the Bank. At the event on September 20, The Usos lost to Breakker and Reed with LA Knight as the special guest referee. At Survivor Series: WarGames on November 29, The Usos teamed with Reigns, CM Punk and Cody Rhodes in a WarGames match against Brock Lesnar, Drew McIntyre, Logan Paul and The Vision (Breakker and Reed) in a losing effort after interference from a mysterious hooded figure which was later revealed to be Austin Theory.

==== Re-joining The Bloodline (2026–present) ====
On the December 8 episode of Raw, The Usos announced that they have reunited and will be returning to tag team competition. On the December 15 episode of Raw, The Usos defeated The New Day to become the number one contenders for the World Tag Team Championship. On the December 29 episode of Raw, The Usos defeated AJ Styles and Dragon Lee to win the World Tag Team Championship, the ninth tag title reign for The Usos. On the March 30, 2026 episode of Raw, The Usos lost their titles to The Vision (Logan Paul and Austin Theory) in a Street Fight, after interference from IShowSpeed ending their reign at 91 days. At WrestleMania 42 Night 1 on April 18, The Usos and LA Knight defeated The Vision and IShowSpeed in a Six-Man Tag Team match ending their feud. After WrestleMania 42, The Usos reunited with Reigns along with Jacob Fatu to officially reform The Bloodline. At Night 1 of SummerSlam on August 1, The Usos and Fatu lost to Knight, Sikoa and Royce Keys in a Six-Man Tag Team Match.

== Other media ==
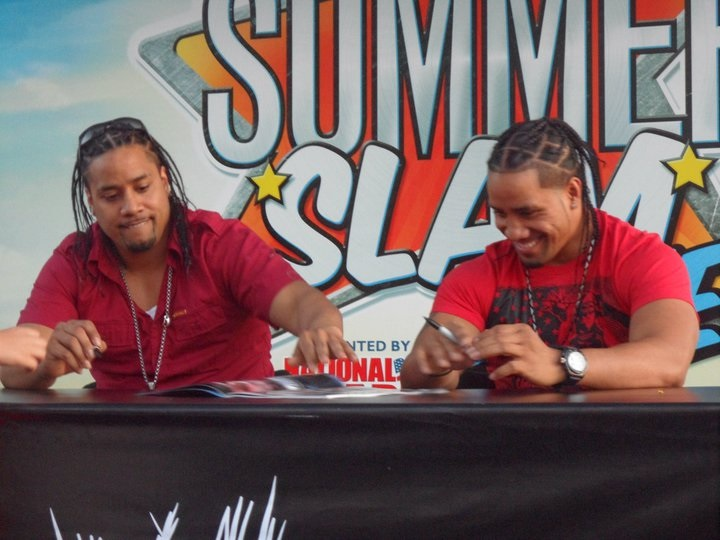
The Usos at an autograph signing at Summerslam 2011.

The pair starred in the first episode of Outside the Ring, where they cooked a traditional Samoan barbecue.

Together, The Usos made their video game debut in WWE '13 as a DLC. The Usos were not in WWE 2K14 but returned in WWE 2K15, and have continued to appear in WWE 2K16, WWE 2K17, WWE 2K18, WWE 2K19, WWE 2K20, WWE 2K22,WWE 2K23, WWE 2K24, WWE 2K25 and WWE 2K26. They also appeared uncredited in Countdown with Dolph Ziggler, Roman Reigns, and Big Show, as well as the animated film The Jetsons & WWE: Robo-WrestleMania!, which they play a role as Usobots, remaining in the same role.

Jimmy was regularly featured in the reality television series Total Divas due to his marriage with Total Divas star Naomi. Jey has also made brief appearances. Jimmy has also appeared in his wife's music video for her song "Dance All Night", which was put on WWE's YouTube channel.

The brothers are regularly featured on Xavier Woods' YouTube channel UpUpDownDown, where Jimmy goes by the nickname 'Uce' and Jey goes by the nickname 'Jucey'. In May 2019, Jimmy unsuccessfully challenged Kofi Kingston in a game of ClayFighter for Kingston's UpUpDownDown Championship. A month later, Jey challenged Kingston for the title in a game of Tetris, where Jey defeated Kingston to win the championship. Jimmy would then defeat Jey in a two-out-of-three game of The King of Fighters XIV to win the championship. He lost the title to Samoa Joe in a game of World Heroes.

After being named the number one contender for the WWE Universal Championship in September 2020, Jey Uso was featured on an episode of the WWE Network mini documentary series WWE Chronicle.

== Championships and accomplishments ==
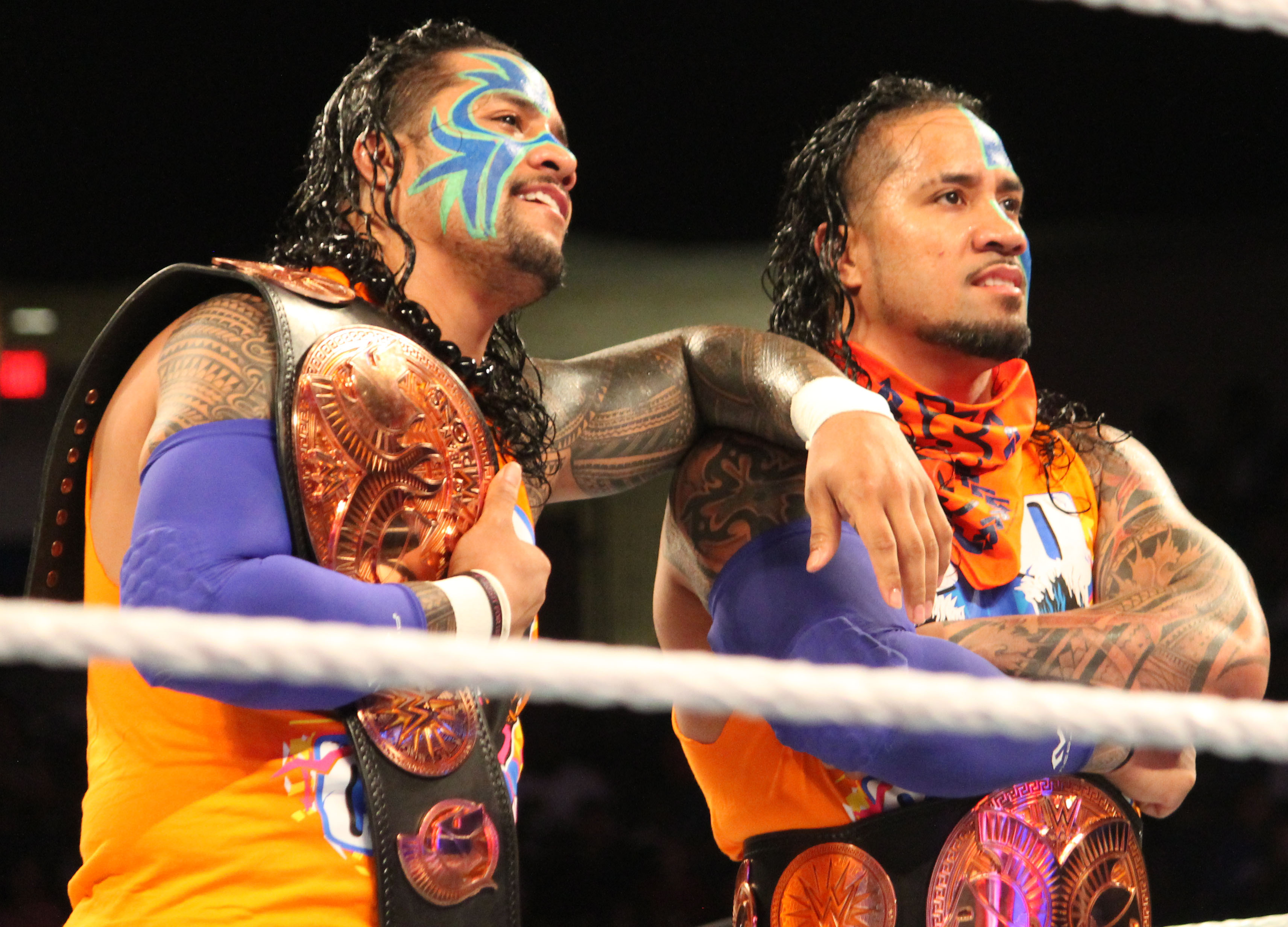
The Usos are 4-time World Tag Team Champions and 5-time WWE SmackDown Tag Team Champions.

- CBS Sports
  - Feud of the Year (2020) Jey Uso vs. Roman Reigns
  - Tag Team of the Year (2018)
- ESPN
  - Best Storyline of the Year (2022) – part of The Bloodline and Sami Zayn
  - Best Storyline of the Year (2023) – part of The Bloodline 2.0
  - Tag Team of the Year (2022)
- Florida Championship Wrestling
  - FCW Florida Tag Team Championship (1 time)
- New York Post
  - Storyline of the Year (2022) – part of The Bloodline and Sami Zayn
  - Storyline of the year (2023)
- Pro Wrestling Illustrated
  - Faction of the Year (2022) – with The Bloodline
  - Tag Team of the Year (2014)
  - Ranked Jimmy No. 25 of the top 500 singles wrestlers in the PWI 500 in 2014
  - Ranked Jey No. 26 of the top 500 singles wrestlers in the PWI 500 in 2014
  - Ranked No. 1 of the top 50 Tag Teams in the PWI Tag Team 50 in 2022
- Rolling Stone
  - Tag Team of the Year (2017)
- Wrestling Observer Newsletter
  - Feud of the Year (2023) as part of The Bloodline vs. Kevin Owens and Sami Zayn
- WWE
  - World Tag Team Championship (Note: The title was named the WWE Tag Team Championship during their first and second reigns and WWE Raw Tag Team Championship during their third reign.) (4 times)
  - WWE SmackDown Tag Team Championship (5 times)
  - André the Giant Memorial Battle Royal (2021) – Jey Uso
  - Slammy Award (3 times)
    - Tag Team of the Year (2014, 2015)
