= Tim White (referee) =

American professional wrestling referee (1954–2022)

- Born: Timothy Rhys White; March 25, 1954; Cumberland, Rhode Island, U.S.
- Died: June 19, 2022 (aged 68); Orlando, Florida, U.S.
- Occupation: Professional wrestling referee
- Years active: 1985–2009

Timothy Rhys White (March 25, 1954 – June 19, 2022) was an American professional wrestling referee. He worked with World Wrestling Entertainment as a producer on the SmackDown! brand. During the 1980s and 1990s, White worked as André the Giant's assistant in addition to his referee duties.

== Professional wrestling career ==
=== Referee ===
White started as a part-time referee in 1985 while working as André the Giant's agent. By the summer 1988, White became a full time referee appearing more frequently on pay-per-views and WWF television tapings, shortly after SummerSlam, White stepped down as a referee to resume his work as Andre The Giant's assistant. By spring 1991, White resumed refereeing duties but only on TV tapings. In February 1993 shortly after the death of Andre, White became a full time referee once again. Bret Hart has reported that by 1995, White was providing similar services for Shawn Michaels as he had for André.

On June 28, 1998, White was the referee for the legendary Hell in a Cell match between Mankind and The Undertaker at King of the Ring. After Mankind fell through the top of the cell and landed hard in the ring, White, fearful that Mick Foley was seriously injured and needed immediate medical attention, came close to declaring the match over at that point, but Foley begged him not to. The match continued and is now remembered as one of the most legendary matches in wrestling history.

In 2002, White suffered a shoulder injury during a Hell in a Cell match between Triple H and Chris Jericho at Judgment Day. At WrestleMania XX in 2004, White returned to referee the match between Chris Jericho and Christian; he re-injured his shoulder during the final three count of the match, forcing him to end his referee career.

=== Lunchtime Suicide ===
On December 18, 2005, White made a controversial on-screen appearance at the Armageddon pay-per-view. In a segment, a "despondent" White was interviewed by SmackDown! reporter Josh Mathews inside the bar he owned, the Friendly Tap in Cumberland, Rhode Island. He was depicted drinking large amounts of alcohol, claiming that the aforementioned Hell in a Cell match "ruined his life." He then proceeded to take a shotgun out from under the bar and, off-screen, fired the gun, apparently intending to kill himself. This sketch was considered distasteful, in part due to the death of Eddie Guerrero a month earlier.

On January 6, 2006, it was revealed that White had shot his foot accidentally during the "ordeal". But when asked by Mathews about his new year's resolutions, he proceeded to scarf down a box full of rat poison, and subsequently fell over in his chair. This segment was leaked onto the internet several days earlier and included was the uncut footage of the post-segment which included the producers as well as White goofing around using some mildly foul language. On January 15, 2006, White was interviewed by Mathews again, but this time he tried to hang himself; the rope broke. For weeks afterward, WWE's official website uploaded a new video showing Mathews trying to interview White who is about to die by suicide each week in a different way. This became a regular segment on WWE's website and was given the name of Lunchtime Suicide, uploaded every Thursday at lunchtime. Over a dozen sketches were aired, and the segments were widely derided as insensitive and of poor taste.

On April 6, 2006, WWE.com uploaded a video where White did not attempt to die by suicide. Instead, he lures Mathews to a party at the Friendly Tap which results in White shooting Mathews in the chest using the shotgun from the first video in the series.

=== Post-WWE ===
White was released from WWE on January 9, 2009, ending his 24-year tenure with the company. White provided security for WWE superstars during appearances and autograph signings. On April 10, 2018, White appeared in numerous interviews in the HBO documentary André the Giant. He also appeared on WWE's Most Wanted Treasures in June 2021. On March 29, 2023, it was announced that White would be the 2023 recipient of the Warrior Award and, as such, was the first referee inducted into the WWE Hall of Fame.

== Death ==
On June 19, 2022, White died from health issues at the age of 68.

== Awards and accomplishments ==
- New England Pro Wrestling Hall of Fame
  - "New England Icon" Award (2010)
- WWE
  - WWE Hall of Fame (Class of 2023 - Warrior Award)
