= Mankind vs. The Undertaker =

Professional wrestling match

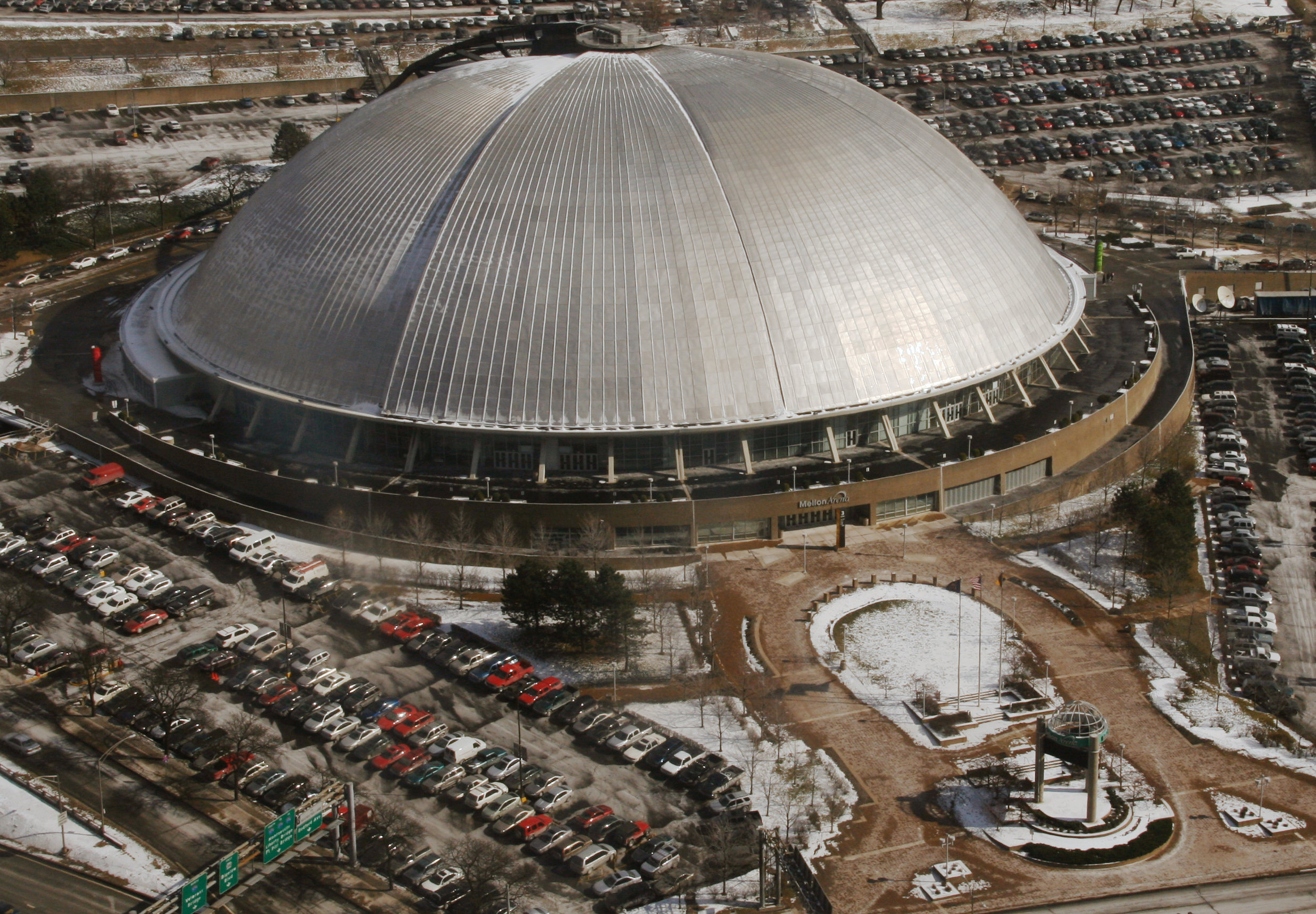
- The Civic Arena in Pittsburgh, the site of the match
- Date: June 28, 1998
- Venue: Civic Arena; Pittsburgh, Pennsylvania, United States
- Event: King of the Ring

Kayfabe
Wrestler		Mankind	The Undertaker
Billed from		"The Boiler Room"	"Death Valley"
Height		6 feet 2 inches (1.88 m)	6 feet 10 inches (2.08 m)
Weight		287 pounds (130 kg)	328 pounds (149 kg)

Working
Performer		Mick Foley	Mark Calaway
Entrance music		"Schizophrenic" by Jim Johnston	"Graveyard Symphony" by Jim Johnston
- Booker(s): Vince McMahon
- Promotion(s): World Wrestling Federation (WWF)
- Position: eighth on the card, semi-main event
- Stipulation(s): Hell in a Cell
- Referee: Tim White
- Incident(s): Mankind was thrown from the top of the cell through an announce table on the arena floor; Mankind was chokeslammed through the top of the cage and onto the ring mat

Result
- The Undertaker defeated Mankind (pinfall, 17:38)

Mankind vs. The Undertaker was a professional wrestling match between Mankind (Mick Foley) and The Undertaker (Mark Calaway) of the World Wrestling Federation (WWF, now WWE), and took place inside a Hell in a Cell, a 16-foot-high (4.9 m) steel cage structure with a roof. It was the third Hell in a Cell match, and it took place at the King of the Ring pay-per-view on June 28, 1998, at the Civic Arena in Pittsburgh, Pennsylvania, United States. Though the match had received little build in the way of storytelling before the event due to the unpredictability of the WWF's Attitude Era, the two characters had an extensive backstory that motivated both performers heading into the match.

The match would immediately set the standard for future Hell in a Cell matches, due to Foley taking two dangerous and highly influential bumps from the top of the cell in an attempt to surpass the previous Hell in a Cell in 1997; planned with veteran wrestler Terry Funk, the first came when The Undertaker threw Mankind through an announcer table positioned on the arena floor, but the second occurred unintentionally when The Undertaker performed a chokeslam on Mankind through the roof of the cell. The match was nearly stopped as a result of both incidents, but continued at the urging of Foley.

Foley received numerous legitimate injuries performing the stunts, and though the match had little impact on his career in the short term, it took a severe physical toll on him in the long term, and eventually became the match he is most remembered for following his retirement in 2000. The match received instant critical acclaim from the wrestling media and is widely regarded as a classic match in the careers of both wrestlers, as well as one of the greatest and most important Hell in a Cell matches and wrestling matches in general. The commentary duo of Jim Ross and Jerry Lawler also received praise, Ross in particular making some of his most famous calls during the match which have overlapped into popular culture.

== Background ==
External videos
- The Story of Mankind vs The Undertaker, YouTube video
- The Undertaker vs. Mankind: WWE Survivor Series 1996, YouTube video
- The Undertaker vs. Mankind – Buried Alive Match: WWE In Your House: Buried Alive, YouTube video
- Kane makes his stunning debut during Undertaker’s Hell in a Cell Match: Badd Blood: In Your House, YouTube video

Upon debuting with the World Wrestling Federation (WWF) in April 1996, Foley's character Mankind immediately began feuding with Calaway's character The Undertaker, and the pair would go on to wrestle a series of matches, beginning with their first PPV match at the King of the Ring PPV event in June, followed by the first ever Boiler Room Brawl at August's PPV event SummerSlam. During the match Paul Bearer (William Moody), The Undertaker's longtime manager, turned on him by hitting him with an urn, allowing Mankind to apply the Mandible Claw for the win. This twist allowed the rivalry to continue into October's In Your House 11: Buried Alive PPV event, where the two competed in the titular Buried Alive match in the main event; The Undertaker won the match after a chokeslam into the open grave.

At the following month's Survivor Series PPV event, The Undertaker returned to face Mankind, this time with Bearer hanging 20 feet (6.1 m) above the ring in a steel cage, with a stipulation that if The Undertaker won the match, he would be able to exact revenge on Bearer. The Undertaker won the match, but interference from The Executioner (Terry Gordy) enabled Bearer to escape. With no manager, The Undertaker was developed into a more human character, with a gothic and rebellious attitude, proclaiming himself to be "The Lord of Darkness". He would win the WWF Championship at WrestleMania 13 in March 1997, and the rivalry with Mankind would be briefly renewed when they competed for the championship at the In Your House 14: Revenge of the 'Taker PPV event in April, with The Undertaker ultimately retaining.

Commentator Jim Ross cites the feud, and Calaway's eagerness to work with Foley, as helping persuade Vince McMahon of the merits of Foley and the Mankind character; McMahon initially had no desire on bringing Foley into the WWF, describing his style as "degrading" and thought Foley himself lacked any talent, but eventually relented to pressure from Ross, who had personally known Foley from their time at rival promotion World Championship Wrestling (WCW). Foley had become famous for wrestling a violent and "hardcore" style, and in 1995 had been crowned "King of the Deathmatch" by Japanese promotion International Wrestling Association (IWA) at their Kawasaki Dream event, defeating Terry Funk in a tournament final, a match Foley has said he is the most proud of.

In regards to Foley's risk taking, former WCW executive producer Eric Bischoff stated that, when Foley had worked for him in the early 1990s, he "wanted to become more physical and more violent, bloodier, and more over the top" and that he had a "bizarre dark side that he needed to explore and feed". Speaking in 2021, Ross said of Foley: "I know Mick appreciated the concern that we all had for him, especially me, because I put my reputation on the line to get him hired. But, you couldn't convince him, he only had one style. He would listen, he would thank me for the concern or anybody else that was speaking to him but it wasn't going to matter. He was a wild horse, he’s going to run".

=== First Hell in a Cell match ===
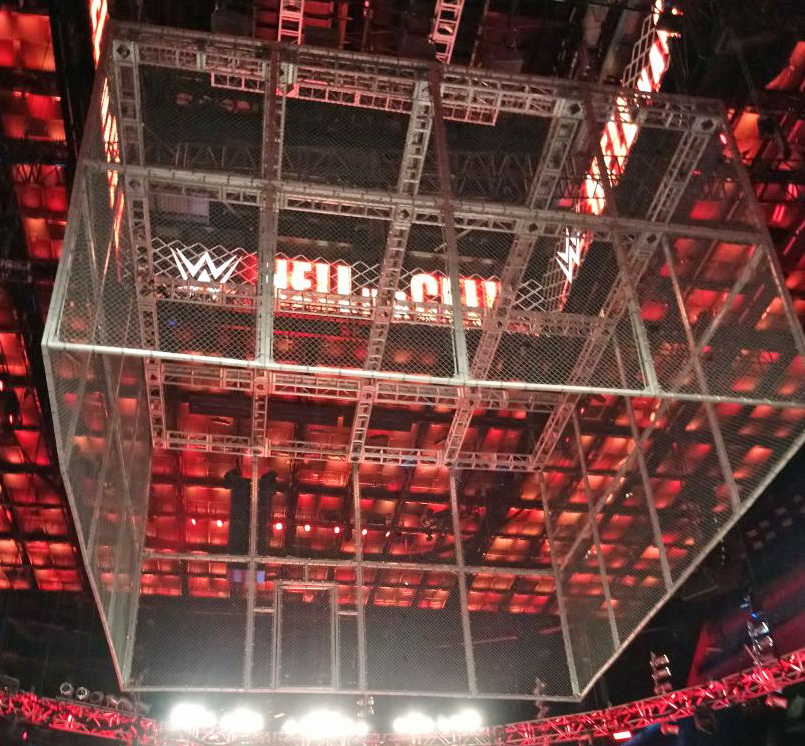
The Hell in a Cell structure

The first Hell in a Cell match took place at the WWF's Badd Blood: In Your House PPV event in October 1997, and was between Shawn Michaels (Michael Hickenbottom) and The Undertaker. The Hell in a Cell match concept was the brainchild of Jim Cornette, and according to Hickenbottom was inspired by a 1983 match in Georgia Championship Wrestling between heated rivals Tommy Rich and Buzz Sawyer, known as the Last Battle of Atlanta. The match was designed to prevent interference from other wrestlers, as well as to allow for the match and the rivalry to reach a definitive conclusion, with the "cowardly" Shawn Michaels character spending portions of the match trying to elude The Undertaker. The conclusion arrived when Kane (Glenn Jacobs), the storyline brother of The Undertaker, débuted by tearing down the cell door and costing The Undertaker the match. During the match, Hickenbottom performed a stunt where he dangled off the roof of the cell and crashed through the announce table, setting a "dangerous precedent". The match received widespread acclaim, including receiving a rating of five stars out of a possible five by professional wrestling journalist Dave Meltzer for his Wrestling Observer Newsletter.

== Prelude to the pay-per-view ==
On the June 1, 1998, edition of Raw is War, having spent months alternating between the characters of Dude Love and Cactus Jack, Foley would revert to the Mankind character, and formed an alliance with Kane. That night, the Undertaker and Kane had a match to determine who would be the number-one contender for Stone Cold Steve Austin's WWF championship. During the match, Mankind interfered by choking Undertaker, allowing Kane to win the match. Mankind and Kane would challenge Undertaker and Stone Cold to the second Hell in a Cell match on the June 15 episode of Raw is War, with the match ending in a no contest. This set up the double main-event for the June PPV King of the Ring; Austin and Kane in a First Blood match for the championship, while The Undertaker and Mankind would be booked for a Hell in a Cell match. The event was scheduled to take place at the Civic Arena in Pittsburgh, 25 miles (40 km) from Freedom, Pennsylvania, where Foley had trained to become a professional wrestler at Dominic DeNucci's wrestling school, bringing his career full circle.

According to WWE producer Bruce Prichard, the original plan for the PPV was for Mankind to challenge Austin for his championship, before Vince McMahon changed the direction in an attempt to be unpredictable. Subsequently, the match had little promotion or storyline building. Calaway went into the match with a fractured ankle, but was adamant he would go through with the match and stunts as planned, later saying that it was of such great importance that he "had to do it". Foley credits head-writer Vince Russo for believing in the Mankind character, giving him confidence heading into the PPV.

=== Planning the match ===
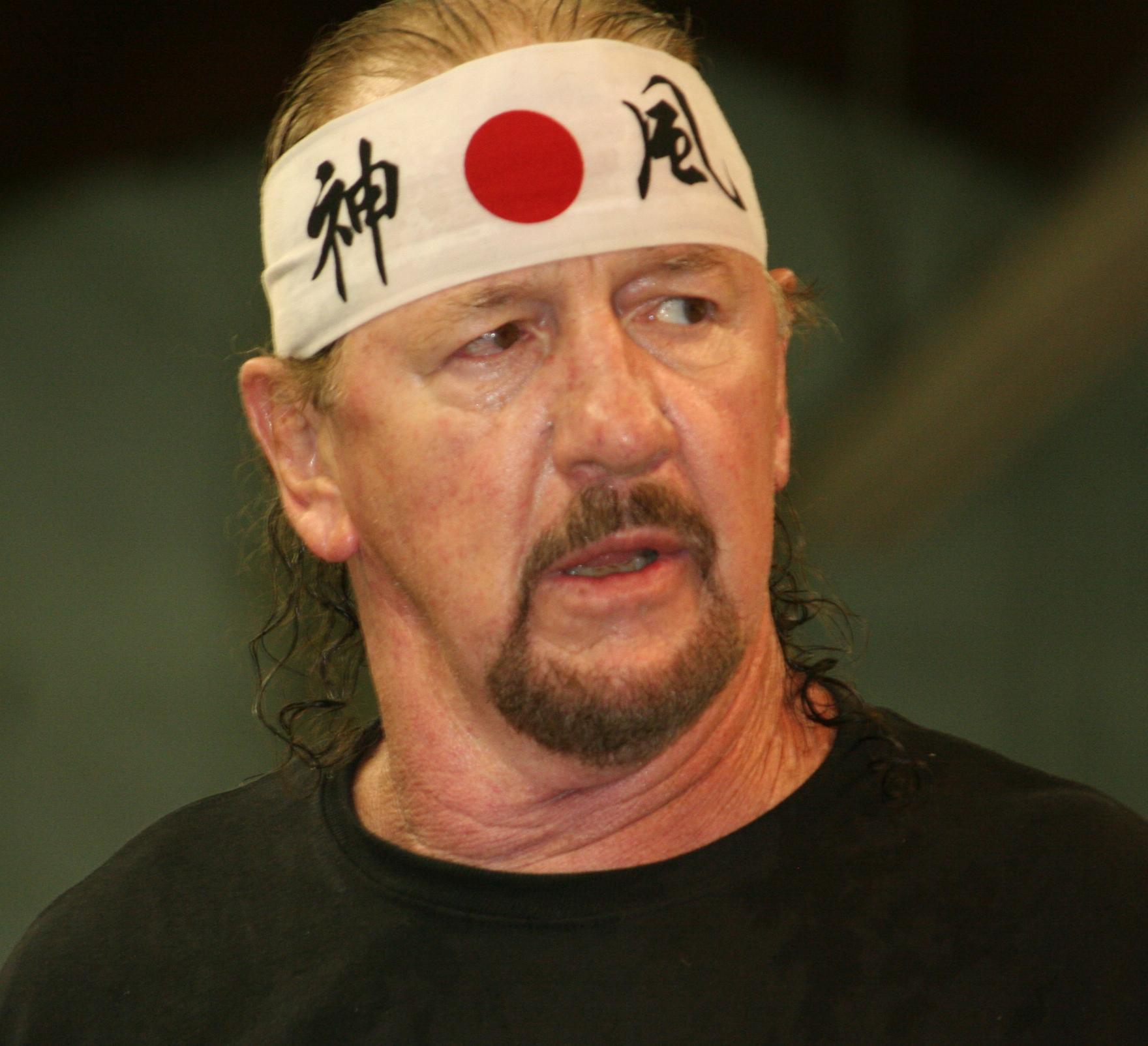
Legendary hardcore wrestler Terry Funk was pivotal in the planning of the match.

Before the match, Foley and fellow wrestler Terry Funk were in Stamford, Connecticut, to watch and discuss the previous year's Hell in a Cell, brainstorming ideas about how to try and top that match, with Funk saying "maybe you should let him throw you off the top of the cage".

"Yeah," I shot back, "then I could climb back up – and he could throw me off again". Man, that was a good one, and we were having a good time thinking completely ludicrous things to do inside, outside, and on top of the cage. After a while I got serious and said quietly to Terry, "I think I can do it."

When presented with the idea of throwing Foley off the top of the cage, Calaway was hesitant, going as far as to ask Foley, "Mick, do you want to die?" Writing in his autobiography Have a Nice Day: A Tale of Blood and Sweatsocks, Foley recalls being asked by Calaway about why he wanted to execute the plan, and his response being, "I'm afraid this match is gonna stink. You can't walk, and, let's face it, I don't have any heat. We've got a heck of a legacy to live up to, and I don't want this match to ruin it. If we can start it out hot enough, we can make people think we had a hell of a match, even if we didn't". Ultimately, Calaway reluctantly agreed to perform the spot. Foley sold him on the idea by saying they could not only begin a match in a way nobody had ever done, they could then have a unique match.

Foley later admitted that he had lied to McMahon, firstly regarding climbing the cell earlier in the day to acclimatize with the situation, as well as about his comfort in performing the stunt, reasoning that had he already been on top of the cell, he "would have realized that getting thrown off was a terrible idea". In a 2018 interview with former wrestling announcer Sean Mooney, match referee Tim White said that although he knew some of the planned moments, he recalled feeling like he was "having a heart attack through the whole match", while commentator Jim Ross remembers hearing rumors backstage of Foley's plans, but dismissed them as absurd and unrealistic.

== Match details ==
=== Mankind's two falls ===
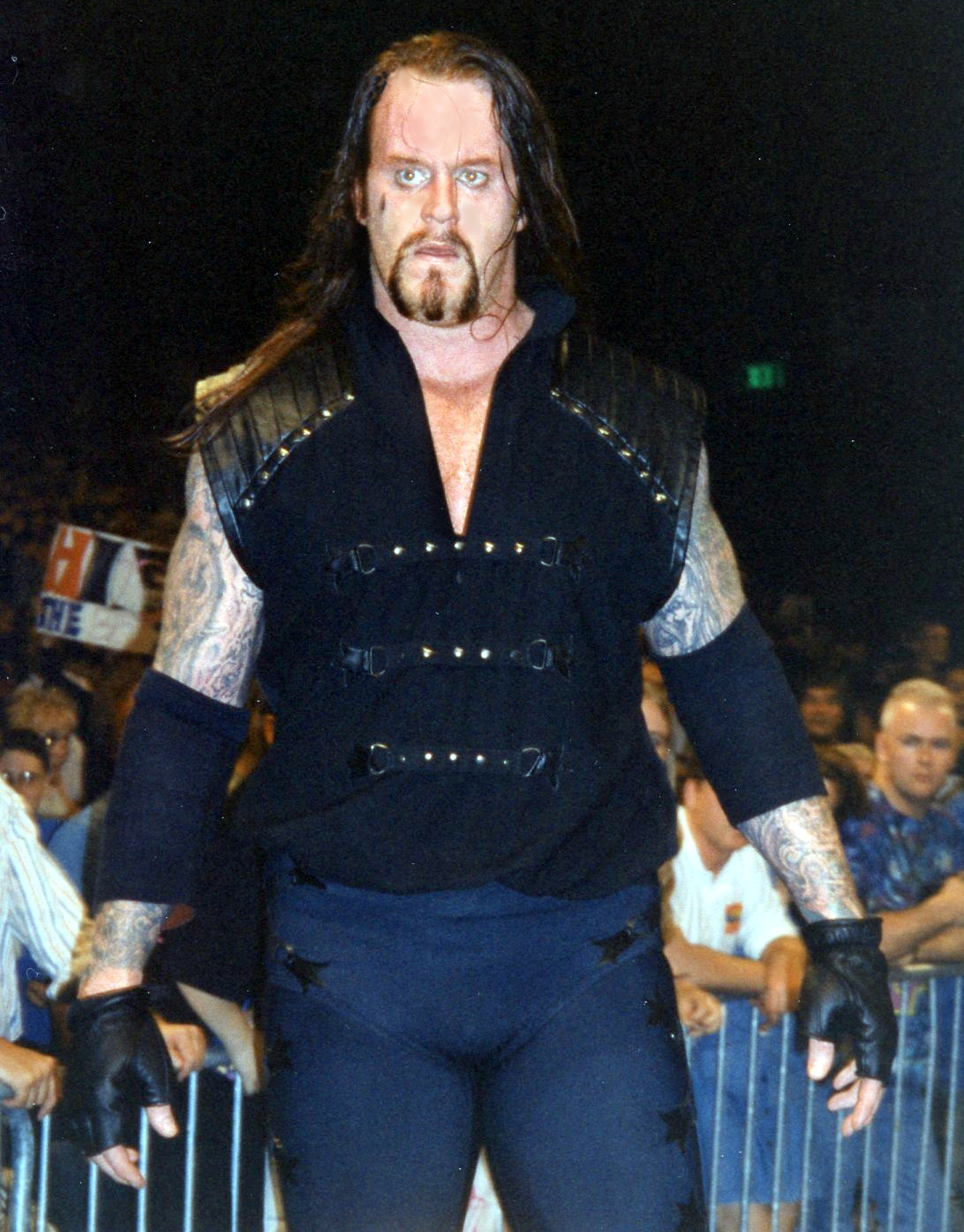
The Undertaker, the winner of the match

External videos
- The Undertaker throws Mankind off the top, YouTube video
- WWE Untold, YouTube video
- Mick Foley discussing the match, YouTube video
- Full Match, YouTube video

Mankind came out first and once he reached the cell, he threw a steel folding chair on top of the structure and began to climb to the top. The Undertaker then made his entrance, and followed Mankind by climbing to the top. Once on top of the cell, Foley considered aborting the planned stunt, but quickly changed his mind, later telling Ross he "wanted to create a moment" for the fans. The pair began exchanging punches and moved towards the edge of the cell. Then, in an "unbelievable moment", The Undertaker grabbed Mankind from behind and threw him from the top of the structure, propelling him 22 feet (6.7 m) through the air, sending him crashing through the Spanish commentators' table and landing on the concrete floor of the arena, which triggered Ross to famously shout, "Good God almighty! Good God almighty! They've killed him!" (Note: Sources vary between "They've killed him!" and "That killed him!") and "As God as my witness, he is broken in half!" Ross later said his reactions were real, and Calaway said he experienced an out-of-body experience in the moment, visualizing himself watching Mankind fly off the cage. It was seen as extra surprising as stunts involving announcers' tables are usually telegraphed by a performer removing bulky CRT monitors to protect the recipient. Hugo Savinovich, one of the Spanish commentators, had vacated his seat just as Foley hit the table in that spot, while fellow Spanish commentator Carlos Cabrera slumped towards Ross and Lawler after Foley's fall.

Mankind remained motionless underneath the broken table, while The Undertaker remained on top of the cell. Medical personnel came out to check on Foley, as did Funk and various others, including McMahon who broke kayfabe by looking legitimately worried about someone his Mr. McMahon character was supposed to dislike. Mankind was placed on a stretcher and began to be wheeled out of the arena. However, Mankind got up from the stretcher and fought off the officials, to climb again onto the top of the cell, with The Undertaker doing likewise. After a brief brawl, The Undertaker performed a chokeslam on Mankind which sent him through the panel of the chain-link cage. The steel chair would also fall through, hitting Mankind as it landed, knocking out several teeth and knocking him unconscious; it was the first time in his career that he had been legitimately knocked out during a match. On commentary, Ross said "Good God... good God! Will somebody stop the damn match? Enough's enough!", while color commentator Jerry Lawler added, "That's it. He's dead".

According to Foley, Calaway and Prichard, the second bump through the cell roof was completely unplanned, Calaway would later say that he thought Foley was legitimately dead following the second fall, and asked Funk to check if he was still alive, while Foley would describe Ross' commentary as "not part of a wrestling match, but a legitimate cry for my well-being". Foley later said that the only reason he survived the fall was because he did not take the chokeslam properly, as he had been too exhausted to lift his body weight in response to the chokehold. In his memoir Have a Nice Day: A Tale of Blood and Sweatsocks, Foley called it both the best and worst chokeslam he ever took, saying that despite its looks, he would have likely died if he had landed properly.

Foley would later explain that the roof of the cell was supposed to sag sufficiently so that The Undertaker could kick Mankind through, allowing him to dangle by his feet and eventually fall in a rotation to land on his front. This is supported by Prichard, who claimed that the original plan was for Calaway to chokeslam Foley at least three times, which would cause the roof of the cage to gradually collapse to a safe distance above the ring. Years later, Calaway would note that just before executing the chokeslam, he had been standing with his left foot on the same panel that Mankind fell through, but decided to place it on the support bar the panel was attached to have more stability for lifting Mankind. Writing in his autobiography More Than Just Hardcore, Funk wrote "watching from the back, I thought he was dead. I ran out here and looked down at him, still lying in the ring where he'd landed. His eyes weren't rolled back in his head, but they looked totally glazed over, like a dead fish's eyes". In 2021, McMahon told A&E that he was "freaked out" by the incidents.

=== Conclusion to the match ===
The Undertaker climbed down and chokeslammed Funk, a move which was not pre-planned, but which Calaway explained happened because he couldn't "just stand there and look around". After getting up and being attended to again by medical personnel, television cameras showed a lingering shot of Mankind smiling through his bleeding mouth and lips, with a loose tooth hanging beneath his nose, the tooth having been knocked out due to being struck by the chair. At the urging of Foley, the match continued for a while longer, eventually reaching a conclusion with Mankind being chokeslammed by The Undertaker onto a pile of thumbtacks, followed by The Undertaker executing his finishing move, the Tombstone Piledriver, and pinning Mankind to end the match.

== Aftermath ==
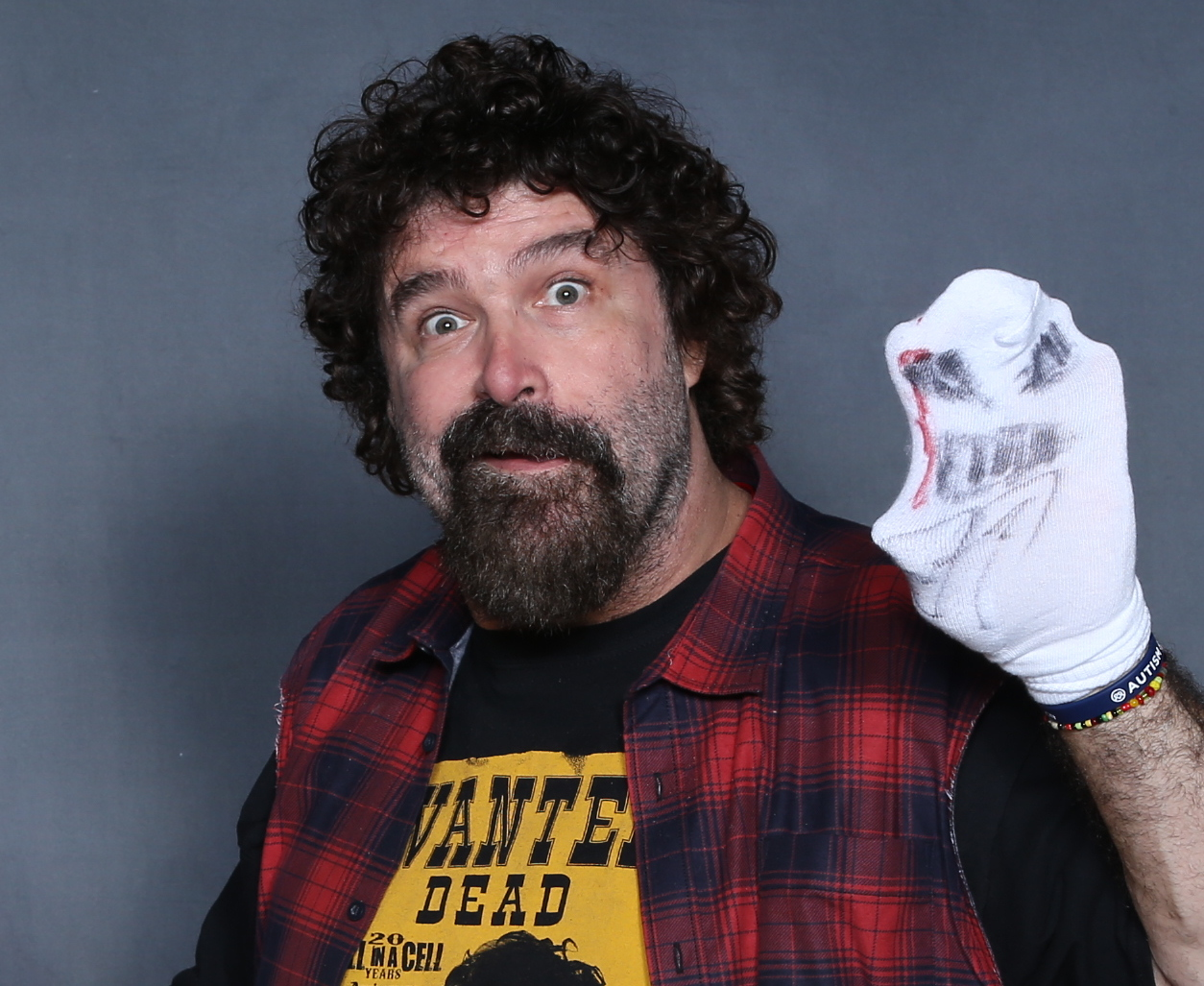
Mick Foley in 2018 wearing "Mr Socko"; he changed the Mankind character and his wrestling style following the match to huge acclaim and success.

External videos
- Mankind vs. Kane – Hell in a Cell Match: Raw, Aug. 24, 1998, YouTube video

Foley received a "rarely seen" standing ovation for the match. In the main event of the PPV between Steve Austin and Kane, the cage would be lowered again when both The Undertaker and Mankind interfered, as Kane won the WWF championship. The fourth Hell in a Cell match took place on Raw is War two months later, a singles match between tag team champions Mankind and Kane, concluding their alliance, with the match featuring another bump through an announce table, this time with Mankind halfway up the side of the cage.

In a 2020 interview with Wrestling Inc, Foley recalled that there was no mention of the match on the following night's Raw is War, as there was a belief that it was not a big moment due to the long history between the two wrestlers. Foley has said that although this match grew in legend, the reality was that his career remained "somewhat sluggish" for sometime afterwards until Foley further developed the Mankind character, and fans began to get behind him. Mankind would go on to become a three-time WWF Champion in the year following the match, and would be inducted into the WWE Hall of Fame on April 6, 2013, while The Undertaker would develop his undefeated WrestleMania streak and win five more world championships before eventually retiring in 2020 and being inducted two years later in 2022.

Foley suffered several injuries in the match: a concussion, a dislocated jaw and shoulder, bruised ribs, internal bleeding, puncture wounds, and several teeth knocked out. After considering retirement, believing wrestling had passed him by, the match made Foley change his approach to wrestling, concluding he could not continue taking such dangerous bumps, leading his Mankind character to become a more gentle one who would later form a tag-team with The Rock (The Rock N Sock Connection) and use an anthropomorphic sock named "Mr. Socko".

Backstage after the match, McMahon said to Foley, "You have no idea how much I appreciate what you have just done for this company, but I never want to see anything like that again." Foley recalled that, after the match and still feeling the effects of the concussion, he turned to Calaway and asked "Did I use the thumbtacks?". Calaway responded sternly "Look at your arm, Mick!", at which point Foley discovered a significant number of thumbtacks still lodged in his arm. Russo was also surprised at Foley's demeanour after the match, recalling him questioning Russo about the quality of the match and if it was just as good as the previous Hell in a Cell. Foley wrote in his first book that his wife Collette cried during a post-match phone conversation between the two, and this made Foley strongly consider retiring from wrestling, something that Foley did eventually do on a full-time basis in 2000. Fittingly, his last match as a full-time wrestler was also a Hell in a Cell match at No Way Out in February 2000; Foley decided to replicate his fall through the roof of the cell during the match and proper precautions were taken to ensure his safety performing the stunt.

=== Reception ===
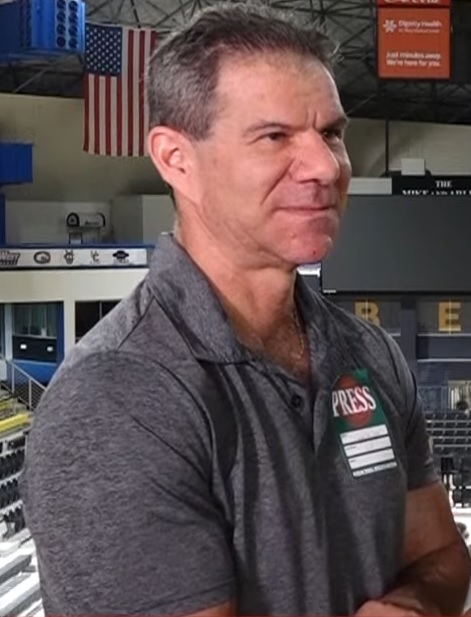
The match received universal critical acclaim, including from prominent wrestling journalist Dave Meltzer.

Writing in his Wrestling Observer Newsletter, wrestling journalist Dave Meltzer awarded the match four-and-a-half stars out of a possible five, saying he would never forget the performance of Foley. Meltzer said Foley had made himself an "all-time legend", and would forever be associated with Hell in a Cell in the same way Bret Hart would always be linked with the Montreal Screwjob, but questioned the future of wrestling if people tried to emulate or one-up the performance of Foley. Fellow wrestling journalist Wade Keller wrote in the Pro Wrestling Torch newsletter that Foley had taken the "two most incredible bumps" in wrestling history, and that it had been the decade's "most memorable match". He predicted that the match would become a "source of inspiration and jealousy" for other wrestlers, but that it had the potential to become an "infamous and regretful" match. John Powell of Slam Wrestling thought that Foley's stunt was reminiscent of one performed by Jimmy Snuka, an event Foley had witnessed live 15 years prior. He described Foley's performance in the match as "unparalleled, memorable", and the match as a whole as "classic". The match was voted Pro Wrestling Illustrated's Match of the Year for 1998.

Michael Landsberg called it "maybe the most famous match ever", while David Shoemaker heralded it as the pinnacle of Foley's career. A contemporary review on 411Mania awarded the match four-and-a-quarter stars out of a possible five, describing it as "the epitome of a spectacle". Writing for the same website in 2002, Scott Keith gave a scathing review, criticizing the lack of wrestling involved as well as the bumps themselves, and awarded the match one star, but also said it is a match worth viewing "to make your own judgment". In a review for the 20th anniversary of the match, John Pollock of Post Wrestling wrote that "it is hard to isolate one specific aspect" of the match, and said it turned Foley from a "cult favourite to a legend". Inside Pulse awarded the match four-stars out of a possible five, describing it as "one of the most memorable matches in the history of professional wrestling", while Writebase praised it as a match "without comparison on a grand stage".

== Legacy ==
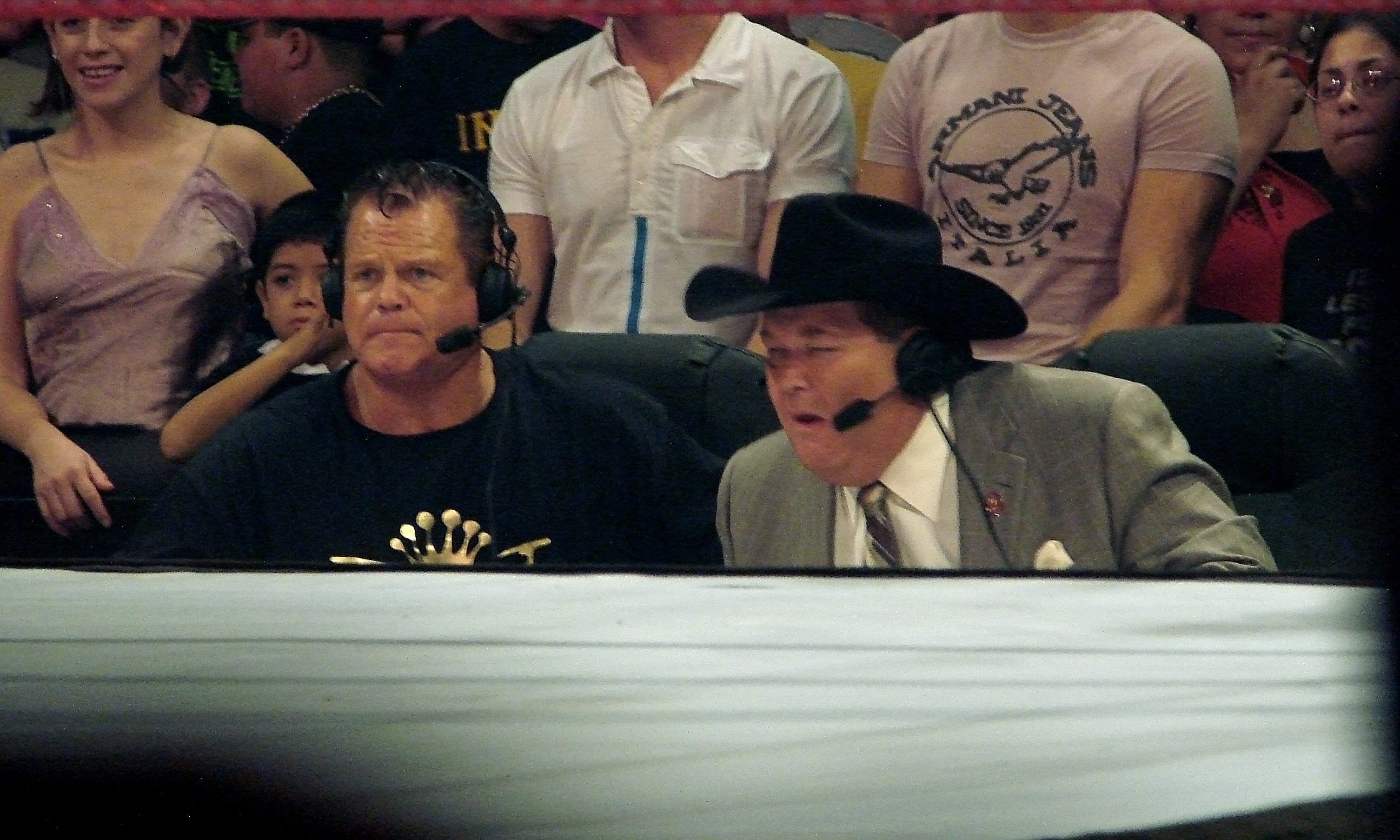
Jerry Lawler (left) and Jim Ross (right) were praised for their commentary.

External videos
- The Undertaker and Mick Foley watch iconic Hell in a Cell Match: WWE Playback, YouTube video

Both participants have said that the original Hell in a Cell match, between The Undertaker and Shawn Michaels at Badd Blood: In Your House on October 5, 1997, was the superior of the two matches; in 2003, Calaway named the Badd Blood contest as his favorite match, while both Foley and Moody have called it the greatest Hell in a Cell match ever. In 2011, Foley's match was named as the number one "OMG!" incident in WWE history, and has been ranked highly amongst the greatest matches and top moments in the history of Hell in a Cell matches. Jim Ross's reactions to Foley's falls have been described as his most famous lines of commentary, which Foley has categorized as being a part of popular culture, and was described by Paste magazine as commentary that "heightened your experience because he was articulating your surprise". The match has been included on several best-of WWE DVD releases, showcasing matches from the careers of both Foley and Calaway, as well as of the King of the Ring PPV and Hell in a Cell matches. Foley and Ross believe that, although there have been better wrestling matches within Hell in a Cell, it was "the most memorable" and almost impossible to exceed. To commemorate the 15th anniversary of the match, WWE conducted an oral history with Foley, Ross, and White, while Calaway was included for an updated 20th anniversary version. For the 25th, Calaway and Foley rewatched the match together.

Foley has been described as the MVP of Hell in a Cell matches, not only for his role in this match, but also for his last match as a full-time wrestler at No Way Out in February 2000; wrestling under his Cactus Jack persona, he competed for the WWF Championship against Triple H, with the match ending when Foley backdropped through the cage and breaking the ring in a planned stunt. In 2018, Foley toured a one-man show titled 20 Years Of Hell, discussing the match in length to an audience, and later filmed a special for the WWE Network exactly 20 years after the match, but said that for years he disliked being known primarily for this match, as there were many other aspects of his career of which he was proud. Speaking with Ross for his podcast The Ross Report in 2018, Foley said that he was "proud to say that this match is something that I no longer run from" because of how brutal and important the match was, and also due to the "many memories it holds for people", and also believes it is "cathartic" to discuss. Foley believes it is the thing most wrestling fans remember him for, while several mainstream media outlets have also ranked it as being among the greatest moments and matches in both Foley's and Calaway's careers, as well as in wrestling history.

"I've always wanted to be remembered as the blood-and-guts guy and the guy that gave the fans their money's worth when they bought a ticket. But I'd also like to be remembered as the guy that made people smile and took their minds off their problems for a couple hours every week.".

— Mick Foley discussing his legacy in a 1999 interview.

Many future matches attempted to replicate some of the spots from the match at King of the Ring, most notably during a Hell in a Cell match at WrestleMania 32 in April 2016 also featuring The Undertaker, where his opponent Shane McMahon paid homage to Foley's first fall by performing a diving elbow from the top of cage, breaking the announce table when The Undertaker moved at the last moment; Michael Cole on commentary yelled "for the love of Mankind" in tribute to Foley. Although many fans regard the match as a classic, it has generated controversy as well. Critics charge that the falls in the match were so extreme and they set the bar for further bumps too high, that the inevitable attempts to equal or surpass them would be very dangerous for any wrestlers involved. Writing for Cultaholic, wrestling author Justin Henry ranked the two bumps as being amongst the top three most brutal bumps in the history of Hell in a Cell, but recognised that attempts at similar bumps had petered out over the years. WWE continued to have Hell in a Cell matches on an annual pay-per-view of the same name, with the match stipulation losing its luster because of this.

In 2019, Meltzer wrote that "with 20 years of perspective", the match was "a terrible thing because of all the stunt bumps it encouraged and how guys got into the business thinking they could get over by doing that stuff rather than wrestling". Meltzer also wrote that a New Japan Pro-Wrestling (NJPW) match of Kota Ibushi versus Tetsuya Naito at Dominion 6.9 in Osaka-jo Hall was the modern successor, in terms of lacking safety for the wrestlers, but is "probably going to be copied and admired". Pollock argues that the match was a negative for both Foley and for professional wrestling as a whole. Foley acknowledged in 2014 while being interviewed about the Monday Night War that, had the match taken place today, WWE would have immediately stopped the match after the first fall off the top of the cage "and rightfully so". In his autobiography Have a Nice Day: A Tale of Blood and Sweatsocks, Foley wrote that he could not remember much of what happened, and he had to watch a tape of the match to write about it, and Foley said in 2020 he still suffers with injuries sustained in the match, particularly having to have false teeth replaced, and also suffers with chronic pain.
