= King of the Ring (1998) =

World Wrestling Federation pay-per-view event

- Promotional poster featuring Sable
- Promotion: World Wrestling Federation
- Date: June 28, 1998
- City: Pittsburgh, Pennsylvania
- Venue: Civic Arena
- Attendance: 17,087
- Buy rate: 385,000
- Tagline: Off With Their Heads

Pay-per-view chronology
← Previous; Over the Edge: In Your House	Next → Fully Loaded: In Your House

King of the Ring event chronology
← Previous; 1997	Next → 1999

King of the Ring tournament chronology
← Previous; 1997	Next → 1999

The 1998 King of the Ring was a professional wrestling pay-per-view (PPV) event produced by the World Wrestling Federation (WWF, renamed WWE in 2002). It was the sixth annual King of the Ring event and hosted the finals of the 12th King of the Ring tournament for men. It took place on June 28, 1998, at the Civic Arena in Pittsburgh, Pennsylvania.

Nine matches were scheduled on the event's card. The main event was a First Blood match that saw Kane defeat "Stone Cold" Steve Austin to win the WWF Championship where if Kane had lost, he would have set himself on fire. The other main match was a Hell in a Cell match in which The Undertaker defeated Mankind. Featured matches on the undercard included the 1998 King of the Ring tournament final that saw Ken Shamrock defeat The Rock to become the "King of the Ring". Another prominent match was a tag team match for the WWF Tag Team Championship (which was only added to the card earlier that morning) where The New Age Outlaws (Billy Gunn and "Road Dogg" Jesse James) defeated The Midnight Express (Bodacious Bart and Bombastic Bob) to retain.

This event produced the best-known Hell in a Cell bout in history, pitting The Undertaker vs. Mankind; Michael Landsberg of TSN's Off the Record in 2002 called it "maybe the most famous match ever". Less than two minutes into the contest, The Undertaker threw Mankind from the top of the 16-foot (5 m) high structure through the Spanish announcers' table. The footage of that fall has since become one of the most used and viewed videos in professional wrestling history. A few minutes later in the match in another memorable moment, The Undertaker chokeslammed Mankind through the top of the structure's roof, briefly knocking him legitimately unconscious.

== Production ==
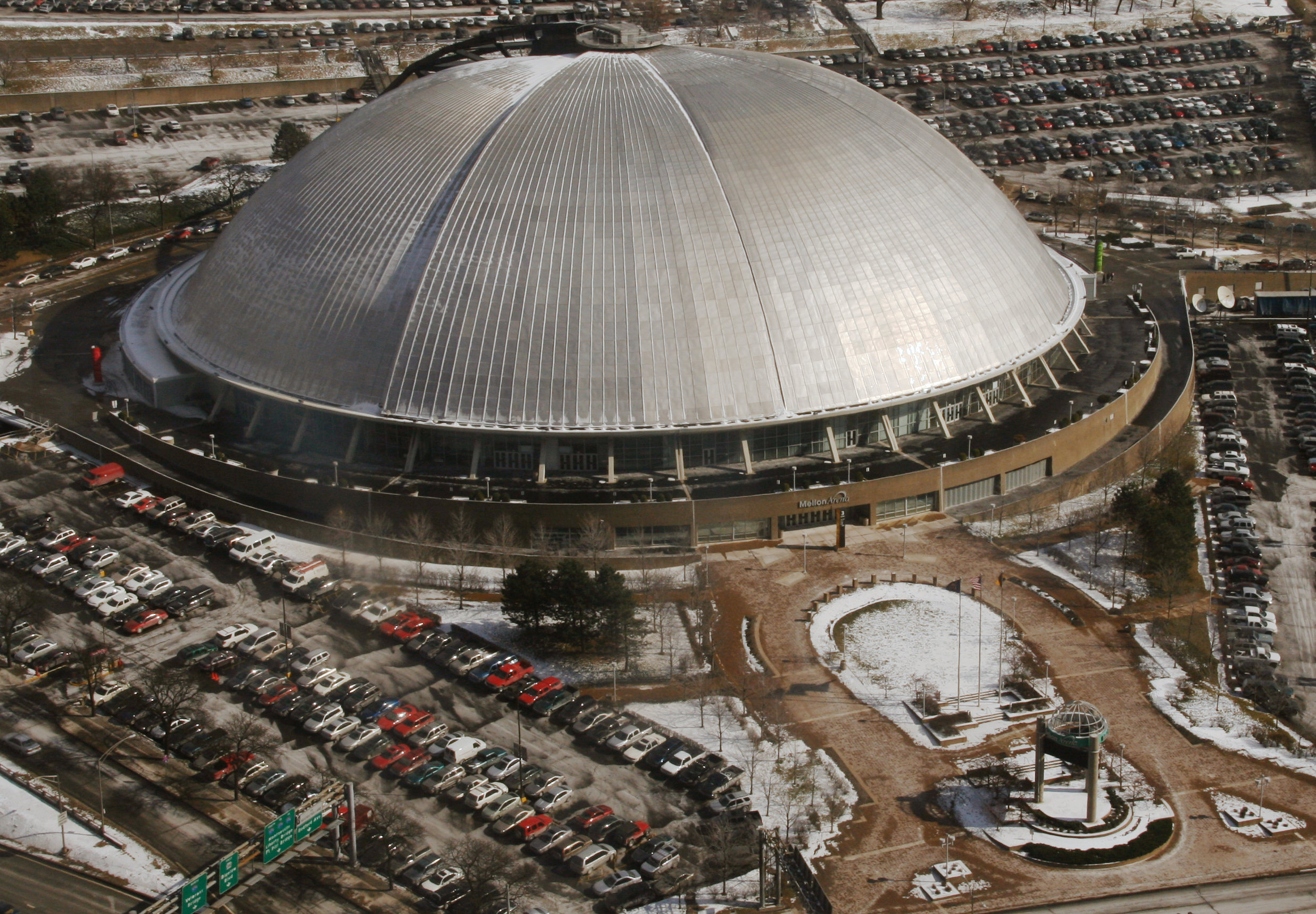
The sixth annual King of the Ring event was held at the Civic Arena in Pittsburgh, Pennsylvania.

=== Background ===
King of the Ring was a professional wrestling pay-per-view (PPV) event held annually in June by the World Wrestling Federation (WWF, renamed WWE in 2002) since 1993. The PPV was named after the King of the Ring tournament, a men's single-elimination tournament that was established in 1985 and held annually until 1991, except for 1990, with the winner crowned the "King of the Ring"; these early tournaments were held as special non-televised house shows. The King of the Ring event became considered as one of the WWF's "Big Five" PPVs, along with the Royal Rumble, WrestleMania, SummerSlam, and Survivor Series, the company's five biggest annual shows of the year. The sixth King of the Ring event was scheduled to be held on June 28, 1998, at the Civic Arena in Pittsburgh, Pennsylvania and it hosted the finals of the 12th tournament.

Unlike the non-televised events, the PPV did not feature all of the tournament's matches. Instead, several of the qualifying matches preceded the event with the final few matches then taking place at the PPV. Other matches took place at the event as it was a traditional three-hour PPV.

=== Storylines ===
The main feud heading into King of the Ring was between "Stone Cold" Steve Austin and Kane over the WWF Championship. On the June 1st episode of Raw Is War, Kane defeated The Undertaker to become the number one contender for the WWF Championship. The previous month at Over The Edge, Austin retained the WWF Championship against Dude Love despite the efforts of Vince McMahon as special referee and Gerald Brisco and Pat Patterson as time keeper and ring announcer respectively. On the June 22nd episode of Raw Is War, McMahon announced that the match between Austin and Kane would be a first blood match a match in which a wrestler who makes his opponent bleed from his face or mouth would be declared the winner. Kane through an electronic voice box declared that if he lost the match he would set himself on fire. Later that night, Austin came to the ring and accepted the match at King of the Ring. Kane came out and had fake blood drenched from the ceiling on Austin.

Another feud heading into King of the Ring was between Mankind and The Undertaker in a Hell in a Cell match. This would be the second Hell in a Cell match on PPV with the first being the one between Shawn Michaels and Undertaker at Badd Blood: In Your House the previous year. On the June 15 episode of Raw Is War, Mankind and Kane teamed up against "Stone Cold" Steve Austin and Undertaker in the first ever tag-team Hell in a Cell match. The bout ended in a no-contest with Undertaker attacking Paul Bearer (who was aligned with Mankind and Kane) inside the cell, while Austin attacked Kane at the top of the structure. This led to a Hell in a Cell match between Mankind and Undertaker at King of the Ring.

== King of the Ring bracket ==
First round (TV)
Vader	4:41
The Rock	Pin
Triple H	CO
X-Pac	5:11
Owen Hart	Sub
Scorpio	5:16
D'Lo Brown	3:08
Dan Severn	Sub
Ken Shamrock	Sub
Kama Mustafa	2:43
Mark Henry	Pin
Terry Funk	4:55
Jeff Jarrett	Pin
Faarooq	3:32
Marc Mero	Pin
Steve Blackman	2:57

Quarterfinals (TV)
The Rock	Pin
Triple H	8:08
Owen Hart	3:00
Dan Severn	Sub
Ken Shamrock	Pin
Mark Henry	4:37
Jeff Jarrett	Pin
Marc Mero	4:31

Semifinals (PPV)
The Rock	Pin
Dan Severn	4:25
Ken Shamrock	Sub
Jeff Jarrett	5:29

Final (PPV)
The Rock	14:09
Ken Shamrock	Sub

== Event ==
=== Preliminary matches ===
Other on-screen personnel
Role:	Name:
English commentators	Jim Ross
English commentators	Jerry Lawler
English commentators	Triple H (King Of The Ring tournament finals match only)
Spanish commentators	Carlos Cabrera
Spanish commentators	Hugo Savinovich
Spanish commentators	Chyna (King Of The Ring tournament finals match only)
Interviewer	Michael Cole
Ring announcer	Howard Finkel
Referees	Tim White
Referees	Earl Hebner
Referees	Jim Korderas
Referees	Jack Doan
Referees	Mike Chioda

The pay-per-view opened with a six-man tag team match between Kaientai (Funaki, Men's Teioh, and Dick Togo) and the team of Taka Michinoku and The Headbangers (Mosh and Thrasher). At the climax of the match, Michinoku executed a Michinoku Driver on Funaki for the win.

It was followed by the first semifinal of the King of the Ring tournament between Ken Shamrock and Jeff Jarrett. Jarrett's manager Tennessee Lee interfered in the match as he and Jarrett targeted Shamrock's ankle but Shamrock made a comeback by hitting a running kick and a powerslam on Jarrett and applied an ankle lock on Jarrett to make him submit.

The next semifinal featured Dan Severn against The Rock. Nation of Domination interfered in the match as Kama Mustafa and Mark Henry distracted the referee, allowing D-Lo Brown to attack Severn and nail a frog splash, helping Rock to win the match.

Next, Al Snow and Head took on Too Much (Brian Christopher and Scott Taylor), with Jerry Lawler serving as the special guest referee. Lawler cheated Snow out of the victory numerous times during the match, allowing Christopher to attach a bottle of Head & Shoulders shampoo to Head and pin it for the win.

In the next match, D-Generation X member X-Pac took on The Nation of Domination member Owen Hart. Mark Henry interfered in the match on Hart's behalf but then Vader showed up and collided with Henry. Hart had applied the Sharpshooter on X-Pac but the referee was distracted, allowing X-Pac's DX teammate Chyna to hit a DDT on Hart and X-Pac pinned him for the win.

Next, The New Age Outlaws (Billy Gunn and Road Dogg) defended the WWF Tag Team Championship against The Midnight Express (Bodacious Bart and Bombastic Bob). Jim Cornette tried to interfere on Express' behalf by using his racket but Gunn stopped him and Chyna nailed a low blow to Cornette and then Outlaws tossed Holly head-first on the ropes for the win to retain the titles.

Later, The Rock took on Ken Shamrock in the final round of the King of the Ring tournament. After a back and forth match, Shamrock applied an ankle lock on Rock to make him submit and win the 1998 King of the Ring tournament.

=== Hell in a Cell match ===
The penultimate match of the event was a Hell in a Cell match between The Undertaker and Mankind (Mick Foley) that has become one of the most watched and discussed in professional wrestling history due to the bumps Foley sustained at his own request and with his full participation.

Before this match, Foley and Terry Funk were discussing the previous year's Hell in a Cell at Badd Blood: In Your House that featured the Undertaker backdropping and slamming Shawn Michaels onto the chain-link ceiling of the cage. Foley and Funk were brainstorming ideas about how to top that match when Funk said, "laughing, 'maybe you should let him throw you off the top of the cage.'" Fittingly for Foley, the King of the Ring was scheduled to take place that year at the Civic Arena in Pittsburgh. Foley himself trained to become a professional wrestler at Dominic DeNucci's wrestling school in nearby Freedom, Pennsylvania, only 25 miles (40 km) from Pittsburgh, bringing his career full circle.

Early in the match, Undertaker tossed Mankind from the top of the cell onto the Spanish announce table. Midway through the match, Undertaker dropped Mankind again from the top of the cell by chokeslamming him through the roof. Near the end of the match, Mankind spread thumbtacks in the ring and applied a Mandible claw on Undertaker but Undertaker dropped him on the thumbtacks and executed a Chokeslam and a Tombstone on Mankind onto the thumbtacks for the win.

=== Main event match ===
The main event was a First Blood match, in which "Stone Cold" Steve Austin defended the WWF Championship against Kane. The Hell in a Cell was lowered, then raised 8 feet, then lowered again when Mankind interfered in the match on Kane's behalf until The Undertaker made the save and attempted to hit Mankind with a chair but Mankind ducked and Austin was accidentally hit with the chair instead, which busted Austin's face. Austin would then attack Kane with a chair to make him bleed but the referee saw Austin bleeding, therefore the referee awarded Kane the win and the title.

== Reception ==
In 2002, Scott Keith of InsidePulse gave the event a rating of Recommended, stating, "The Bottom Line: Wildly divergent opinions on you-know-what aside, there was some really solid wrestling in the form of Rock-Shamrock and NAO-NME. Owen-XPac narrowly misses match of the night honors. And Foley-UT is really worth a look, if only to make your own judgment on it."

In 2003, Dan of Cult of Whatever gave the event a rating of 8/10, stating, "You won’t need much persuasion However if you are looking at it as a PPV overall, it is not bad, ok it is not a great PPV but it has its good points, The Austin/Kane match is good, and the other mid card matches are enjoyable. As you would expect my favourite match was Undertaker/Mankind, it was just amazing. If you buy this you will almost certainly enjoy it as much as I did."

In 2017, Kevin Pantoja of 411Mania gave the event a rating of 5.0 [Not So Good], stating, "Judging by the first few matches, this was on pace to be a horrendous Pay-Per-View. Once we got past the Semi-Finals and dumb Too Cool match, everything else was pretty solid. The King of the Ring Finals were pretty good and the main event was an enjoyable Attitude Era brawl. Obviously, the key to the show was the memorable Hell in a Cell match, which is a must see for any wrestling fan, even if it is just for historical purposes."

== Aftermath ==
The following night on Raw Is War, "Stone Cold" Steve Austin defeated Kane to regain the WWF Championship and began a feud with both Kane and The Undertaker, which lasted through September. At Fully Loaded: In Your House in July, Austin and The Undertaker defeated Kane and Mankind for the WWF Tag Team Championship, but dropped the titles back to them in a fatal four-way match on the August 10 episode of Raw Is War.

Kane and The Undertaker were gradually revealed to be in cahoots with each other over the WWF Championship. As part of the storyline, Kane turned on Mankind at SummerSlam, losing the tag team titles to the New Age Outlaws, and The Undertaker ordered his brother not to interfere in his title match with Austin in the main event. The feud culminated in a match at Breakdown: In Your House in September, where Kane and The Undertaker simultaneously pinned Austin. This led to a match between Kane and The Undertaker at Judgment Day: In Your House in October, where Austin, who was the special referee, attacked both men and refused to count a fall. After the match, The Undertaker turned on Kane and reunited with Paul Bearer, reigniting their feud.

== Results ==
No.	Results	Stipulations	Times
1	The Headbangers (Mosh and Thrasher) and Taka Michinoku defeated Kaientai (Funaki, Men's Teioh, and Dick Togo)	Six-man tag team match	6:44
2	Ken Shamrock defeated Jeff Jarrett (with Tennessee Lee) by submission	King of the Ring semi-final	5:29
3	The Rock defeated Dan Severn	King of the Ring semi-final	4:25
4	Too Much (Brian Christopher and Scott Taylor) defeated Al Snow and Head	Tag team match with Jerry Lawler as special guest referee	8:26
5	X-Pac (with Chyna) defeated Owen Hart	Singles match	8:30
6	The New Age Outlaws (Billy Gunn and "Road Dogg" Jesse James) (c) (with Chyna) defeated The Midnight Express (Bodacious Bart and Bombastic Bob) (with Jim Cornette)	Tag team match for the WWF Tag Team Championship	9:34
7	Ken Shamrock defeated The Rock by submission	King of the Ring final	14:09
8	The Undertaker defeated Mankind	Hell in a Cell match	17:38
9	Kane (with Paul Bearer) defeated "Stone Cold" Steve Austin (c) by making Austin bleed first	First Blood match for the WWF Championship; Had Kane lost, he would have had to set himself on fire.	15:58
(c) / – the champion(s) heading into the match
