= Cinta de Oro =

American professional wrestler (born 1977)

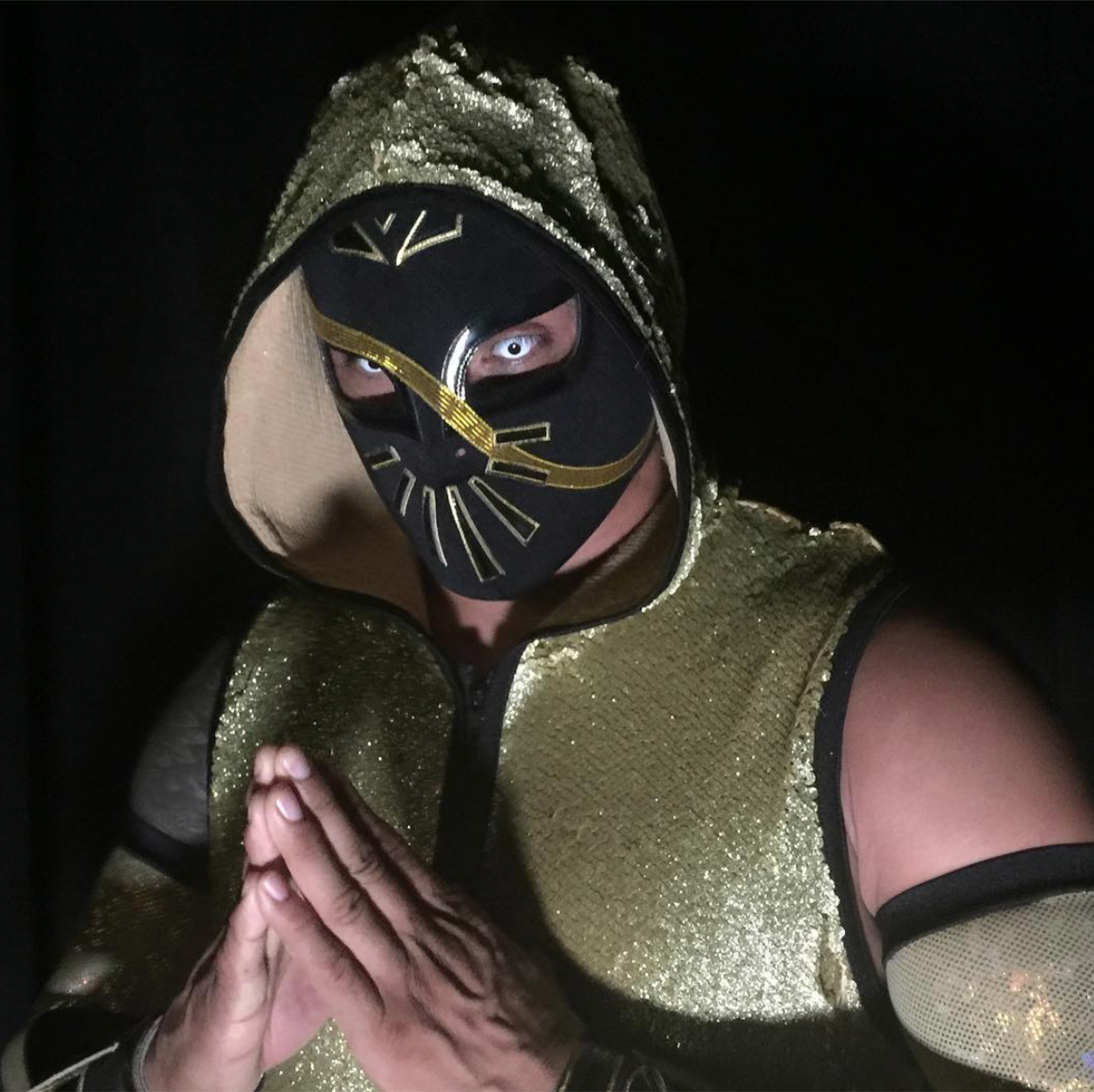
- Arriaga in 2017

Personal information
- Born: José Jorge Arriaga Rodríguez; September 5, 1977 (age 49) El Paso, Texas, U.S.
- Children: 2

Professional wrestling career
- Ring name(s): Cinta de Oro (II); Hunico; Incognito; Jorge Arias; Místico; Místico de Juarez; Mystico; Mystico de Juarez; Sin Cara (II); Sin Cara Negro
- Billed height: 5 ft 7 in (170 cm)
- Billed weight: 198 lb (90 kg)
- Billed from: El Paso, Texas; Juárez, Mexico; Mexico City
- Trained by: Cinta de Oro (I)
- Debut: November 21, 1999

José Jorge Arriaga Rodríguez (born September 5, 1977) is an American professional wrestler. He is the founder of Cinta De Oro Promotions and works on the Mexican independent circuit, under the ring name Cinta de Oro (Spanish for 'Golden Ribbon'). He is best known for his tenure in WWE, under the ring name Sin Cara (Spanish for 'Faceless'), where he was the second and longest-tenured wrestler to use the persona.

Prior to his signing with WWE, he wrestled under the ring name Místico or Mystico (Spanish for 'Mystic') under which he worked for Mexican professional wrestling promotion AAA and various independent promotions in the United States and Mexico. During this time, CMLL wrestler Místico (Luis Urive) grew in popularity, and since CMLL originally owned the legal rights to the character, Arriaga had to change his ring name to Místico de Juarez and later to Incognito, under which he wrestled in promotions like Chikara, Total Nonstop Action Wrestling, and the National Wrestling Alliance.

Arriaga signed with WWE in 2009 and debuted on the main roster in 2011 as Sin Cara, temporarily replacing the original performer of the character, who coincidentally was also Luis Urive. Following the return of Urive, the two began a storyline, with Arriaga donning a black mask, and was referred to on commentary as Sin Cara Negro. Arriaga subsequently lost a Mask vs. Mask match against Urive and began wrestling unmasked under the ring name Hunico. In 2013, after the release of Urive, Arriaga reprised his role as Sin Cara. In September 2014, Arriaga won the NXT Tag Team Championship alongside Kalisto as a part of the Lucha Dragons. He departed the company in December 2019.

== Early life ==
Jose Jorge Arriaga Rodriguez was born on September 5, 1977, in El Paso, Texas, to Mexican immigrant parents. Arriaga grew up in El Segundo Barrio in El Paso. While working towards his goal of becoming a professional wrestler, Arriaga worked in his grandfather's funeral home in Juarez, Mexico. He also gained a degree in embalming and funeral director services in Mexico. Arriaga attended El Paso Burges High School and in 1996 was an undefeated state wrestling champion who was voted the MVP of the state tournament.

== Professional wrestling career ==
=== Early career (1999–2004) ===
Arriaga began wrestling at Burges High School from 1992 to 1996, where in 1995 he placed 3rd in State of Texas and in 1996 he became an undefeated State Champion. He then embarked on a professional career, as he managed to continue working for his family's funeral home in Ciudad Juárez, Chihuahua, Mexico, during the early 2000s under the ring name "Mistico". This masked ring persona may or may not have preceded the in-ring debut of Místico (Luis Urive) in Consejo Mundial de Lucha Libre (CMLL), but Paco Alonso owned the legal rights to the name "Místico" since 1999 anyway, forcing Arriaga to change his name to "Mystico" or "Mistico de Juarez" to differentiate from the original. On February 2, 2004, he defeated Nicho El Millonario to win the WWA Middleweight Championship but was stripped of the title in March when he had to stop wrestling in the Tijuana, Baja California area where the World Wrestling Association was based.

=== Lucha Libre AAA Worldwide (2004–2005) ===
In early 2004, he began working regularly for Lucha Libre AAA Worldwide (AAA), CMLL's main Mexican rival and had to change his name in order to avoid any type of legal problems. With minor adjustments to his mask and tights, he became known as "Incognito" instead. While he was signed to AAA for over a year, Incognito made few wrestling appearances, spending most of his time training in AAA's school to improve his wrestling skills. In 2005, he had left AAA and began working for various independent wrestling promotions on both sides of the US/Mexico border, exploiting the fact that he was a US citizen and spoke English well to get more bookings in the US than most luchadors typically can.

=== Total Nonstop Action Wrestling (2006) ===
Incognito first made a name for himself in the United States when he participated in Total Nonstop Action Wrestling's (TNA) 2006 World X-Cup Tournament. As part of Team Mexico, Incognito's only match in the World Cup tournament was a 16-man gauntlet match that included all four World Cup teams. Incognito was eliminated by Sonjay Dutt. Team Mexico finished in third place out of four teams.

=== National Wrestling Alliance (2007) ===
Following his appearance for TNA, Incognito began working regularly for the National Wrestling Alliance (NWA), often teaming with fellow Luchador Sicodelico Jr. The two participated in a tournament to crown new NWA World Tag Team Champions, but lost to Joey Ryan and Karl Anderson in the final match, a match that also included Billy Kidman and Sean Waltman.

=== Chikara (2007–2008) ===
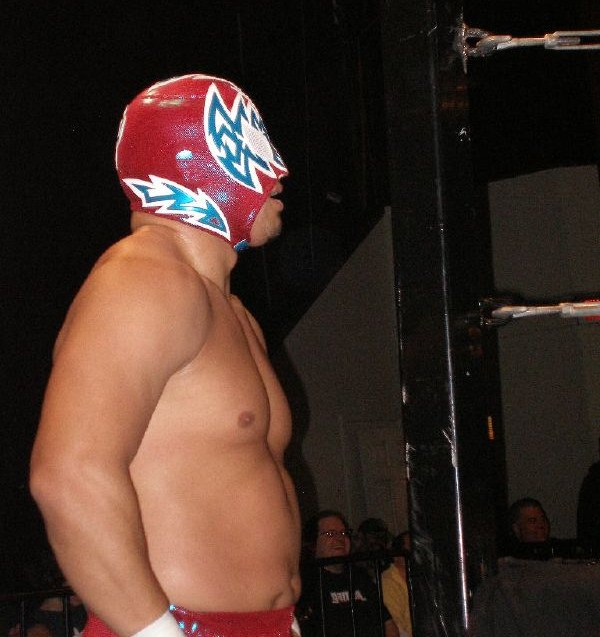
Arriaga as Incognito at Chikara's 2008 King of Trios tournament

On September 22, 2007, Incognito made his first appearance for the Lucha Libre inspired Chikara promotion when he participated in their annual 16-man torneo cibernetico tournament. Incognito was part of an eight-man team consisting only of masked wrestlers (Equinox, Las Chivas Rayadas, Lince Dorado, Los Ice Creams and Magno). The team lost to the Kings of Wrestling. Incognito returned to Chikara in 2008 for a series of appearances. He teamed with El Pantera and Lince Dorado to form the team Los Luchadores de Mexico (Spanish for 'the Wrestlers from Mexico') winning Chikara's 28-team King of Trios 2008 tournament when they defeated BLKOUT (Eddie Kingston, Joker and Ruckus) in the finals. Incognito went on to win the 2008 Rey de Voladores ("King of the Fliers") tournament when he defeated Helios in the finals on May 18, 2008. In April 2009 Incognito made two appearances for Ring of Honor, working on the same shows where his friend Blue Demon Jr. worked. On April 3 he teamed with Chris Hero and Eddie Edwards to defeat Jay Briscoe, Kevin Steen and Magno and on April 4 he teamed with Hero, Edwards and Davey Richards in a loss to El Generico, Steen, Briscoe and Magno.

=== World Wrestling Entertainment/WWE (2009-2019) ===
==== Developmental territories (2009–2011) ====
On December 14, 2009, Arriaga worked a "try out" match for World Wrestling Entertainment (WWE) working without a mask, under the name Jorge Arias, losing a tag team match against The Dudebusters. Shortly after Arriaga signed a developmental deal with WWE following his try out match and started in WWE's farm league Florida Championship Wrestling. He later changed his ring name to Hunico although his mask and outfit remained unchanged. In April Hunico began teaming with Tito Colon, wrestling Florida Tag Team Champions The Uso Brothers (Jimmy Uso and Jey Uso) but were unsuccessful. Later on Tito Colon was given a new ring persona, an enmascarado (masked) character called "Dos Equis" (after the Dos Equis beer), which was later changed to "Epico", and the team was named Los Aviadores (Spanish for 'The Aviators'). On June 3, 2010 Los Aviadores defeated The Uso Brothers to win the Florida Tag Team Championship. On July 15 Los Aviadores lost the tag team titles to Kaval and Michael McGillicutty, but regained the titles the following day in a rematch. On August 12 Hunico and Epico lost the FCW Florida Tag Team Championship to Johnny Curtis and Derrick Bateman in a three-way match, which also involved the team of Donny Marlow and Brodus Clay. On July 26, 2011, Hunico wrestled in a dark match at the NXT tapings, losing to Justin Gabriel.

==== Main roster debut and unmasking (2011–2013) ====
On the August 12 episode of SmackDown, Arriaga made his WWE debut, taking over the role of Sin Cara from Luis Urive, the former CMLL Místico, who was serving a 30-day suspension for violating WWE's wellness program, and defeated Tyson Kidd. Arriaga reprised his role of Sin Cara the following week, taking part in a battle royal to determine the #1 contender to the World Heavyweight Championship, from which he was the last man eliminated by the winner, Mark Henry. On August 20, Urive took back the role of Sin Cara for a live event. At the following tapings of SmackDown, Arriaga once again appeared under the mask. On the August 30 episode of SmackDown, Sin Cara defeated Daniel Bryan and attacked Bryan after the match, turning heel for the first time.

At the tapings of the September 16 episode of SmackDown, the original Sin Cara made his return, confronting Arriaga's impostor version of the character. On the September 19 episode of Raw, the impostor Sin Cara attacked the original character prior to his match with Cody Rhodes, but was forced to flee after a brief brawl. On the September 23 episode of SmackDown, the impostor Sin Cara attacked the original version during his match with Daniel Bryan, took his place in the match and pinned Bryan for the win. The following week, he revealed a new black attire to distinguish himself from the original version, while also explaining that he was going to steal the Sin Cara identity from Urive, just as Urive had stolen the Místico identity from him six years prior. At Hell in a Cell, the impostor Sin Cara, now being referred to as "Sin Cara Negro", was defeated by the original Sin Cara, now referred to as "Sin Cara Azul". The feud continued on the following SmackDown with Negro attacking Azul. The rivalry culminated at the October 16 taping of SmackDown in Mexico City in a Mask vs. Mask match, where Sin Cara Azul was victorious, unmasking Arriaga after the match.

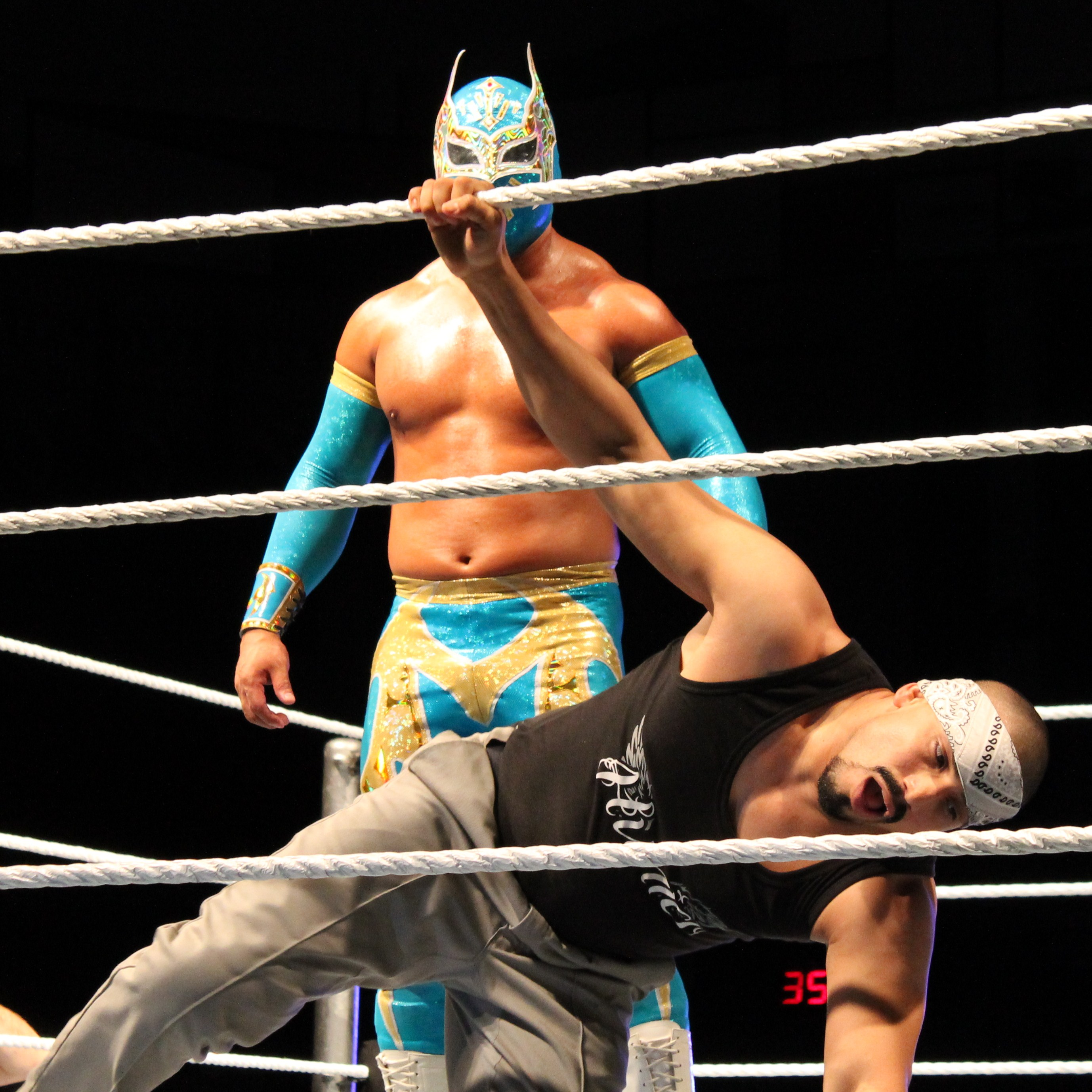
Arriaga, as Hunico, wrestling in a match during his feud with the original Sin Cara (Luis Urive)

On the October 28 SmackDown, Negro was interviewed by Matt Striker, where he wanted payback for losing to Azul while revealing his name to be Hunico, a name he used in FCW. He also adopted a new gimmick, portraying a stereotypical Mexican hoodlum, wrestling in street attire and addressing the audience in both Spanish and English. On the November 4 SmackDown, Hunico continued his rivalry with Sin Cara by attacking him together with his debuting FCW tag team partner Epico. Despite Epico's cousin Primo soon joining them, this was short lived as Primo & Epico went on to align with Rosa Mendes. Hunico's feud with Sin Cara was cut short when Sin Cara suffered a legit injury at Survivor Series, which required surgery. On the December 15 Superstars, Hunico introduced FCW's Donny Marlow (son of Haku) as his new bodyguard as they rode to the ring in a lowrider bicycle (which would become Hunico's signature entrance). The following week, Marlow's new name was revealed as Camacho. It was revealed that Hunico and Camacho's friendship arose from Hunico once saving Camacho from several attackers, resulting in Hunico being stabbed but biting a man's eyeball out in the process.

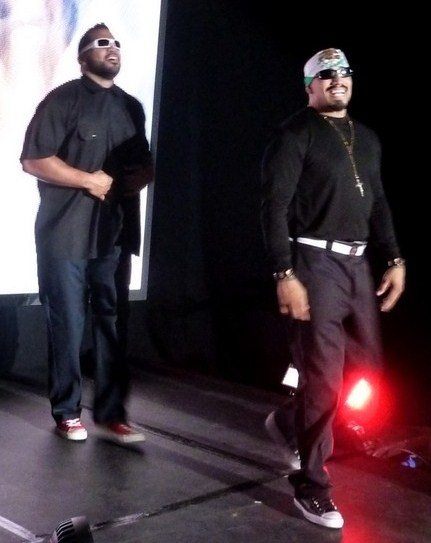
Hunico (right) with Camacho in 2013

In January 2012, Hunico started a feud with Ted DiBiase after Hunico was offended that he was not invited to one of DiBiase's Posse parties. After both wrestlers scored two wins apiece, Hunico defeated DiBiase on the February 17 SmackDown to end the feud. After his feud with DiBiase, Hunico wrestled extensively on Superstars, going on an unbeaten streak in Superstars singles matches by defeating the likes of Ezekiel Jackson, Yoshi Tatsu, and Justin Gabriel. In April, Camacho began regularly teaming with Hunico. In June, Hunico lost to the returning Sin Cara, on the June 4 Raw and at No Way Out. In the pre-show of Money in the Bank, Hunico and Camacho lost to the WWE Tag Team Champions Kofi Kingston and R-Truth in a non-title match. At Raw 1000 in July 2012, Hunico, along with Camacho and four other wrestlers attempted to ambush Kane to make a statement, but The Undertaker returned to save Kane, disposing of Hunico with a chokeslam and a tombstone piledriver. Hunico then underwent surgery for a torn anterior cruciate ligament in the knee.

Hunico returned to in-ring action (but not television) at the WrestleMania Axxess live event on April 4, 2013, once again teaming with Camacho. Hunico and Camacho returned to television on the November 6 Main Event and lost to The Usos. Hunico and Camacho's first title shot was for the NXT Tag Team Championship on the December 11 NXT, where they lost to the defending champions The Ascension.

==== Re-masking and The Lucha Dragons (2013–2016) ====
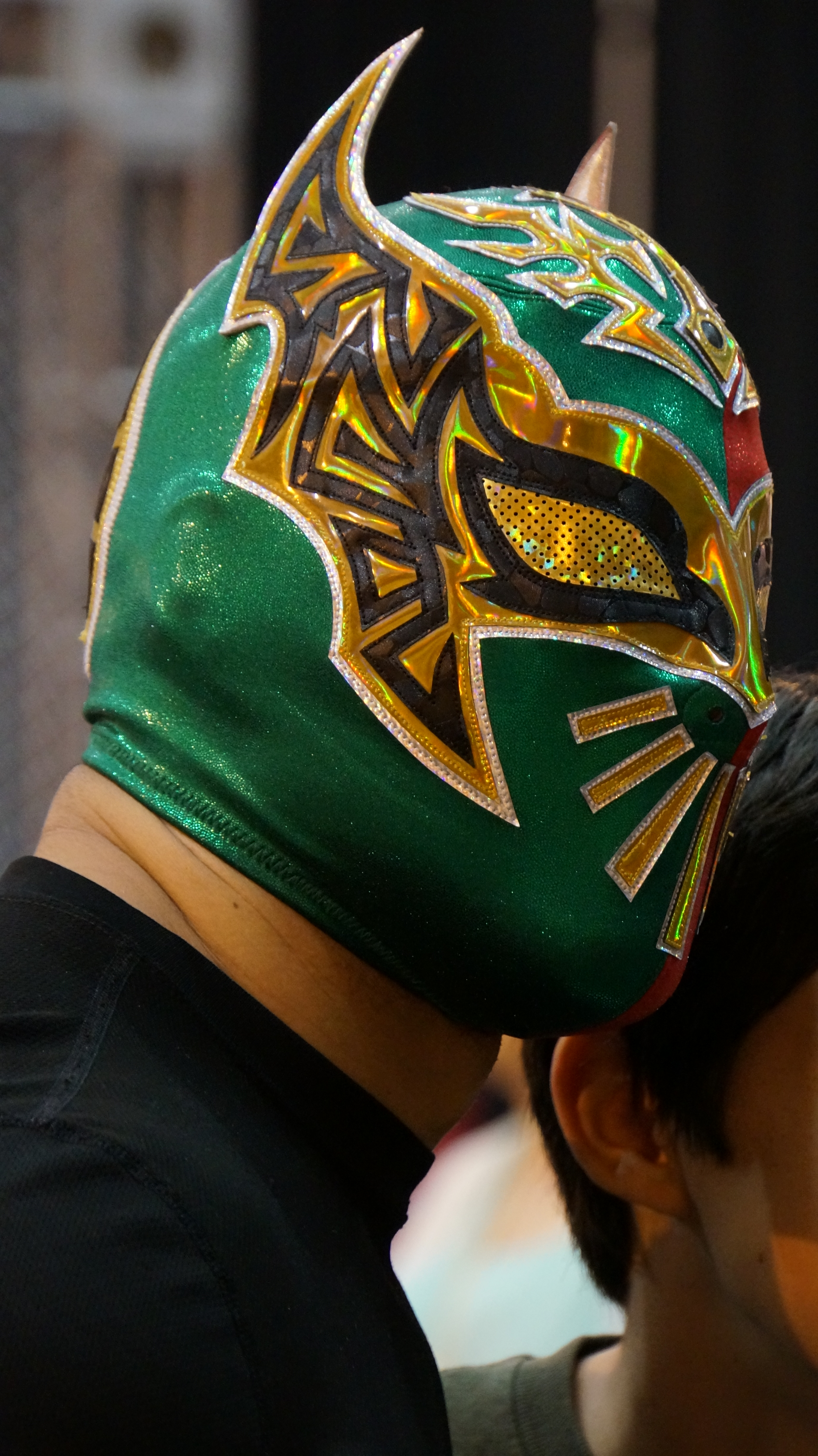
Sin Cara in April 2014

On the December 2, 2013, the Sin Cara character returned to Raw, with Arriaga reprising the character and defeated Alberto Del Rio, and the character experienced a resurgence as he embarked on a winning streak throughout the month. Sin Cara's streak was ended by Del Rio on the January 6, 2014, episode of Raw. As 2014 progressed, Sin Cara was unsuccessful in winning four battles royal: the André the Giant Memorial Battle Royal at WrestleMania XXX, a battle royal for the WWE United States Championship in May, a Money in the Bank qualifying battle royal in June and a battle royal for the WWE Intercontinental Championship at Battleground.

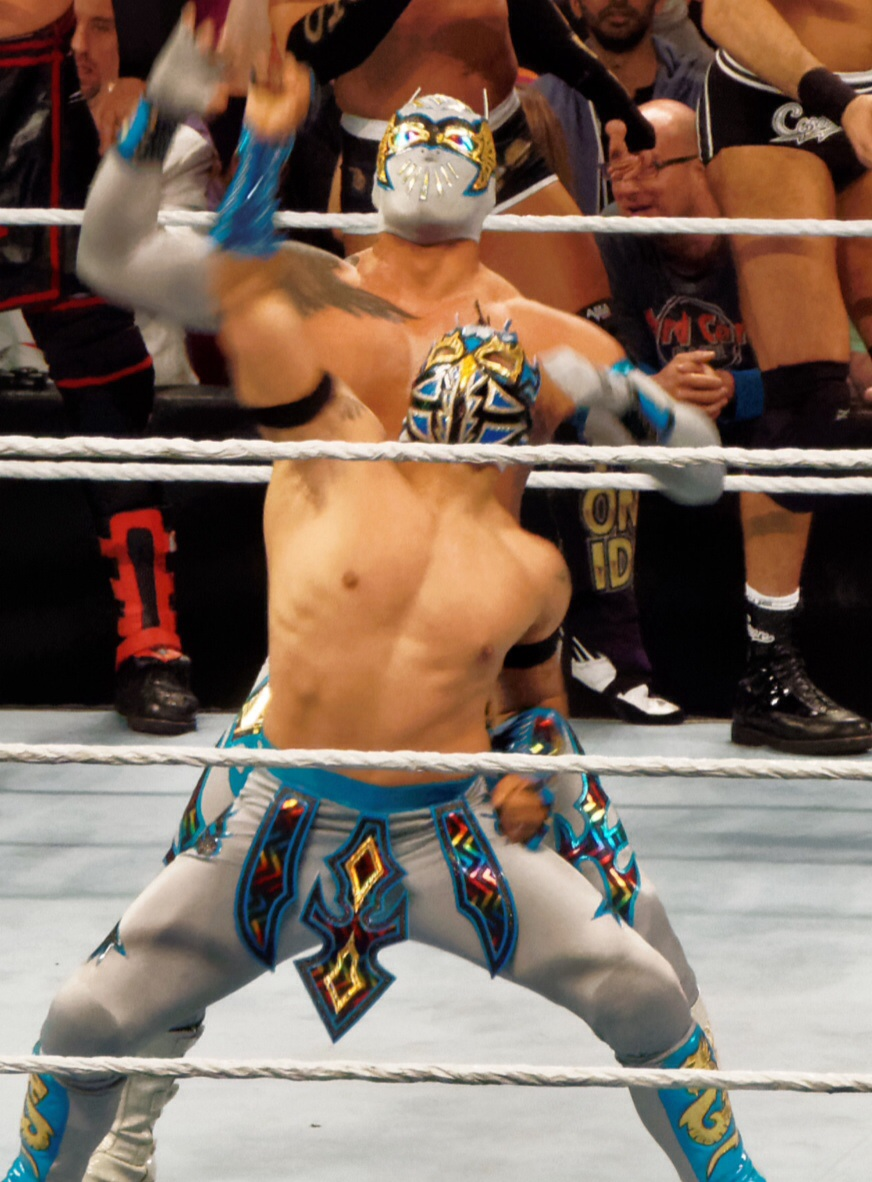
The Lucha Dragons in March 2015

Soon after, Sin Cara was sent to NXT, where he formed a tag team with Kalisto known as "The Lucha Dragons". At NXT TakeOver: Fatal 4-Way, Sin Cara and Kalisto defeated The Ascension (Konnor and Viktor) to win the NXT Tag Team Championship, and Arriaga' first title in WWE. After defeating Intercontinental Champion Bad News Barrett in a non-title match on the January 9, 2015, episode of SmackDown, Sin Cara was awarded a title shot against Barrett on the taped episode of Smackdown which aired on January 15, but lost the match. On the January 28 episode of NXT, The Lucha Dragons lost the NXT Tag Team Championship to Wesley Blake and Buddy Murphy. Sin Cara competed in the André the Giant Memorial Battle Royal at WrestleMania 31, but failed to win the match. The following night on Raw, The Lucha Dragons made their main roster debut as a team in an 8-man tag team match, teaming with The New Day (Big E and Kofi Kingston) to defeat Tyson Kidd and Cesaro and The Ascension. At Elimination Chamber, The Lucha Dragons competed in the first ever tag team Elimination Chamber match for the WWE Tag Team Championship, however they failed to capture the titles. In late June, The Lucha Dragons took a small part in the ongoing feud between The New Day and The Prime Time Players on the June 25 episode of SmackDown, when they teamed with The Prime Time Players in a winning effort against The New Day and Bo Dallas. At SummerSlam, The Lucha Dragons competed in a Fatal 4-Way tag team match for the WWE Tag Team Championship which was won by The New Day.

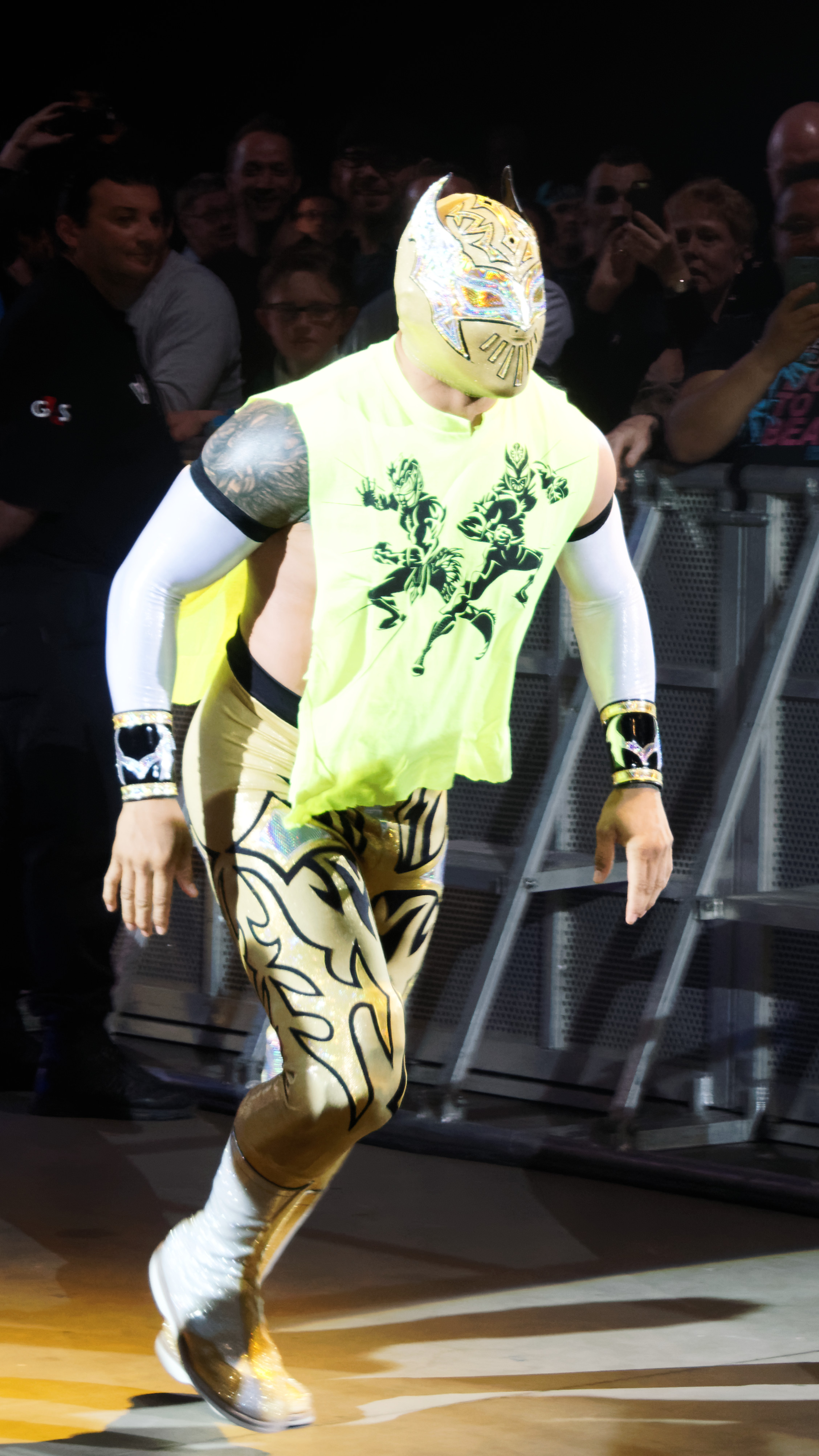
Sin Cara during a WWE event in 2015

At Night of Champions, The Lucha Dragons and Neville were defeated by The Cosmic Wasteland (Stardust, Konnor and Viktor). At TLC: Tables, Ladders and Chairs, The Lucha Dragons, The Usos and The New Day competed in a triple threat tag team ladder match for the WWE Tag Team Championship, which was won by The New Day, who retained their titles. The following week, on a live episode of SmackDown, The Lucha Dragons received another tag team title shot, but they were once again defeated by The New Day. On the December 28 episode of Raw, Sin Cara dislocated his shoulder in a match with Big E, leaving him out of action. On February 6, Sin Cara returned from injury, teaming with Kalisto in a winning effort. On the March 21 episode of Raw, Sin Cara faced Stardust and Zack Ryder in a triple threat match to determine the #1 contender for the Intercontinental Championship, which ended in no contest, after Intercontinental Champion Kevin Owens interfered in the match. Afterwards, it was announced that Sin Cara would compete in a 7-man ladder match for the title at WrestleMania 32 against Owens, Stardust, Ryder, Dolph Ziggler, Sami Zayn and The Miz, which he lost.

==== Brand switches and departure (2016–2019) ====
On July 18, Sin Cara and Kalisto announced they were disbanding and entering the 2016 draft as singles competitors. As a result of the draft, Sin Cara was drafted to the Raw brand. On the September 5 episode of Raw, Sin Cara confronted Braun Strowman, who had removed a luchador's mask the previous week. Sin Cara berated Strowman for disrespecting luchador tradition, igniting a feud between the two. On the following weeks on Raw, Strowman would defeat Sin Cara in two matches by countout and pinfall. On the October 10 episode of Raw, Sin Cara teamed with Lince Dorado to defeat Tony Nese and Drew Gulak. During the match, it was confirmed that Sin Cara would be competing in the cruiserweight division. At the Hell in a Cell pay-per-view on October 30, Sin Cara participated in a six-man tag team match, teaming with Lince Dorado and Cedric Alexander to defeat Tony Nese, Drew Gulak and Ariya Daivari.

On April 11, 2017, Sin Cara was moved to the SmackDown brand as part of the Superstar Shake-up. On the October 17 episode of SmackDown Live, Sin Cara started a feud with the United States Champion Baron Corbin, but on November 6, Sin Cara revealed on Twitter that he suffered a legitimate leg injury during the European tour against Baron Corbin. However, the injury was not severe and he was cleared to compete shortly afterwards. On the November 14 episode of SmackDown Live, Sin Cara failed to win the United States Championship, after being defeated by Corbin. At WrestleMania 34 on April 8, 2018, Sin Cara competed in the André the Giant Memorial Battle Royal, but failed to win. On the May 29 episode of SmackDown Live, Sin Cara tried to reconnect with Andrade "Cien" Almas only to be blown off. At Extreme Rules on July 15, Sin Cara lost to Almas. On August 15, it was reported that Sin Cara underwent knee surgery. In March 2019, he was cleared to return to in-ring action. At Super ShowDown on June 7, 2019, Sin Cara competed in the 51-man battle royal, but failed to win.

As part of the 2019 draft, Sin Cara was drafted to Raw and restarted his feud with Andrade, where he lost against him on the October 21 and 28 episodes of Raw. Sin Cara also allied with NXT wrestler Carolina to face Andrade and Andrade's manager Zelina Vega, but they were defeated by Andrade and Vega on the November 4 episode of Raw. After the match, Arriaga asked WWE for future plans and, while several WWE producers didn't answer him, Raw's Executive Director Paul Heyman told him the character of Sin Cara was "dead", which was one of the reasons to leave the company. On the November 11 episode of Raw, Sin Cara was defeated by Drew McIntyre, in what would be his final televised match in WWE. On the same night the show was aired, Arriaga requested his release from WWE, citing that while grateful about the opportunities that WWE gave him, he felt unappreciated and wanted to expand his career elsewhere. On December 8, WWE officially granted his release and Arriaga departed from the company.

=== Return to Mexico (2019–present) ===
On December 14, 2019, at Lucha Libre AAA Worldwide's annual Guerra de Titanes show, Arriaga made a surprise appearance after one of the matches. Arriaga, wearing the Sin Cara mask and using his WWE ring name, saved Pagano from an attack and then announced that he would return in 2020. On December 17, Arriaga announced that he would be changing his ring name to "Cinta de Oro" ("Golden Ribbon"), to continue the legacy of the original performer of the character who died in 2016. The sons of the original performer gave Arriaga permission to do so, and handed him the last mask worn by their father. On April 19, 2020, Arriaga competed in his first match under the Cinta de Oro gimmick, teaming with Pagano to defeat Aéreo and El Hijo Del Impostor at a De Juarez Para El Mundo event.

=== Cinta De Oro Promotions (2023–present) ===
In 2023, Arriaga founded his own wrestling promotion called "Cinta De Oro Promotions". The promotion held its first event on November 27, 2023, called Cuentas Pendientes, where Arriaga lost his IOCW Championship to Andrade El Idolo in the main event.

== Personal life ==
Arriaga has a son and a daughter.

In November 2016, it was reported that WWE had ordered Arriaga to take anger management classes, following separate altercations with Simon Gotch and Chris Jericho.

Arriaga is friends with Raúl Jiménez, who plays for Wolverhampton Wanderers. Jiménez celebrated scoring a goal in April 2019 by briefly donning a mask in the style of Sin Cara's. Arriaga visited Wolverhampton Wanderers in May 2019.

== Other media ==
Arriaga made his video game debut in WWE '13 as Hunico, and later appeared in WWE 2K16, WWE 2K17, WWE 2K18, WWE 2K19, and WWE 2K20 as Sin Cara.

== Masks ==
Sin Cara wore multiple masks every year, with a mesh tray paper on each eye opening at the masks. Unlike Rey Mysterio and Kalisto, he did not have a mouth opening and instead placed mesh tray papers on several mouth opening stripes. These masks covered his full face.

== Filmography ==
Year	Title	Role	Notes
2014	Scooby-Doo! WrestleMania Mystery	Himself	Unvoiced
2016	Countdown	Himself	Uncredited cameo

== Championships and accomplishments ==
- Chikara
  - King of Trios (2008) – with El Pantera and Lince Dorado
  - Rey de Voladores (2008)
- The Crash Lucha Libre
  - The Crash Heavyweight Championship (1 time)
- Florida Championship Wrestling
  - FCW Florida Tag Team Championship (2 times) – with Epico
- International Open Challenge World Championship
  - IOCW Championship (3 times, current)
- Pro Wrestling Illustrated
  - Ranked No. 93 of the top 500 singles wrestlers in the PWI 500 in 2012
- Pro Wrestling Legacy
  - PWL Tag Team Championship (1 time, current) – with Magno
- World Wrestling Association
  - WWA Middleweight Championship (2 times)
- Northern Wrestling Federation
  - NWF Heavyweight Championship (1 time)
- WWE
  - NXT Tag Team Championship (1 time) – with Kalisto
  - NXT Tag Team Championship #1 Contender's Tournament (2014) – with Kalisto
  - Slammy Award (1 time)
    - Double Vision Moment of the Year (2011) – with Sin Cara Azul
- Other Accomplishments
  - La Copa "Loco Zandokan" (2009)

== Luchas de Apuestas record ==
Winner (wager)	Loser (wager)	Location	Event	Date	Notes
Sin Cara Azul (mask)	Sin Cara Negro (mask)	Mexico City	SmackDown	October 16, 2011	Aired October 21, 2011.
