= Hell in a Cell (2011) =

WWE pay-per-view event

- Promotional poster featuring John Cena
- Promotion: WWE
- Date: October 2, 2011
- City: New Orleans, Louisiana
- Venue: New Orleans Arena
- Attendance: 9,400
- Buy rate: 182,000

Pay-per-view chronology
| ← Previous; Night of Champions | Next → Vengeance |

Hell in a Cell chronology
| ← Previous; 2010 | Next → 2012 |

The 2011 Hell in a Cell was a professional wrestling pay-per-view (PPV) event produced by WWE. It was the third annual Hell in a Cell event and took place on October 2, 2011, at the New Orleans Arena in New Orleans, Louisiana. The event centered on the men's Hell in a Cell match, a 20-foot-high roofed steel cage that surrounds the ring and ringside area with no countouts or disqualifications and the only way to win is by pinfall or submission in the ring.

Eight matches took place at the event, including one match on the pre-show and two Hell in a Cell matches on the main card. In the main event, Alberto Del Rio defeated CM Punk and defending champion John Cena to win the WWE Championship in the first-ever Triple Threat Hell in a Cell match. In the other Hell in a Cell match, Mark Henry defeated Randy Orton to retain the World Heavyweight Championship.

The event received 182,000 pay-per-view buys, down from 210,000 buys the previous year. This was the first Hell in a Cell event held following the end of the first brand split in August. This was also the first Hell in a Cell event held to be promoted under the company's shortened trade name of WWE, as following WrestleMania XXVII in April, the company ceased using its full name of World Wrestling Entertainment, although that remains the legal name of the company.

== Production ==
=== Background ===
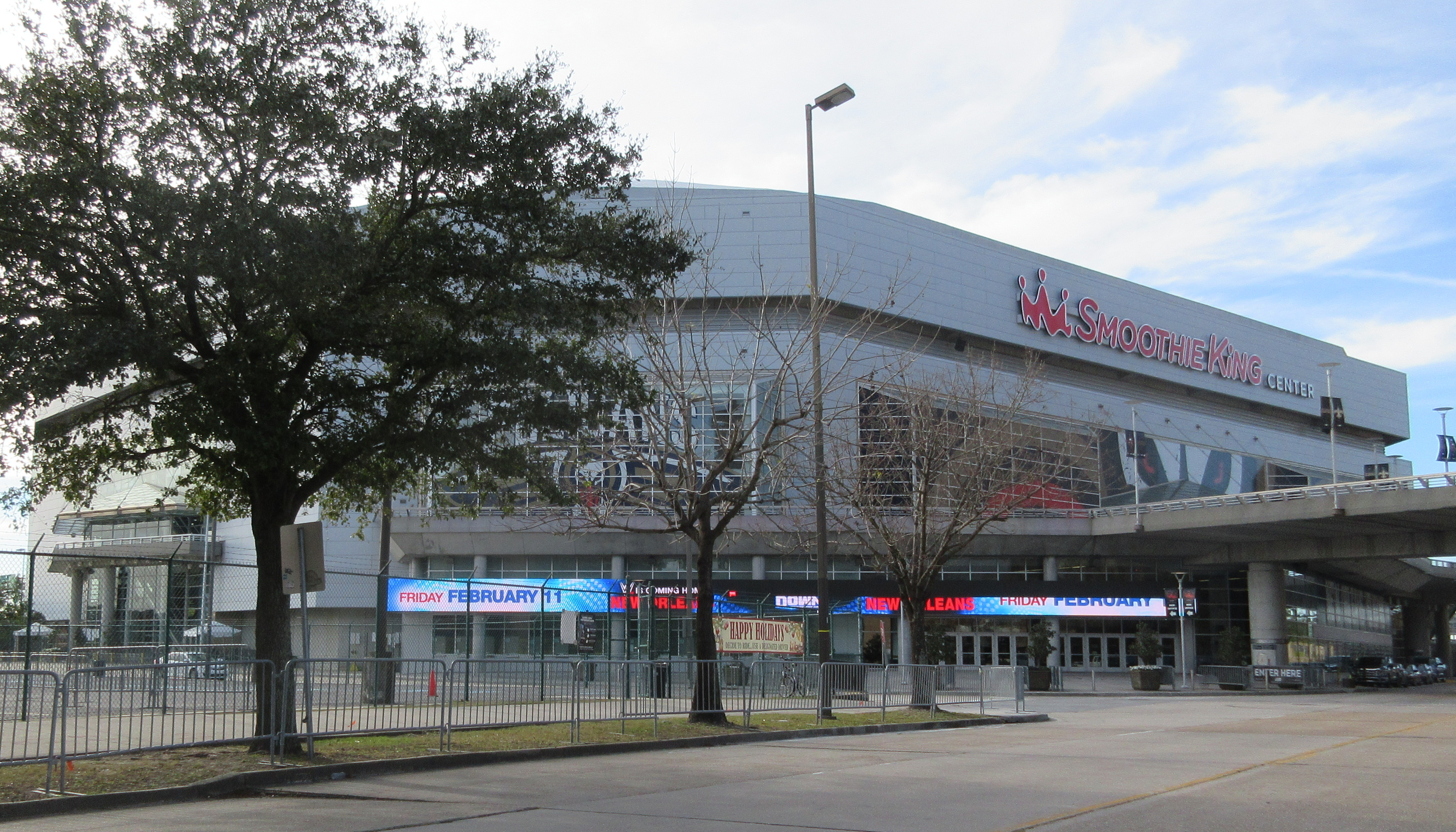
The third annual Hell in a Cell event was held at the New Orleans Arena in New Orleans, Louisiana.

Hell in a Cell was an annual professional wrestling pay-per-view (PPV) event produced every October by WWE since 2009. The concept of the event came from WWE's established Hell in a Cell match, in which competitors fought inside a 20-foot-high roofed cell structure surrounding the ring and ringside area. The main event match of the card was contested under the Hell in a Cell stipulation. The third Hell in a Cell event was held on October 2, 2011, at the New Orleans Arena in New Orleans, Louisiana.

This was the first Hell in a Cell event held since the end of the first brand split in August. It was also the first Hell in a Cell event held to be promoted under the company's shortened trade name of WWE, as following WrestleMania XXVII in April, the company ceased using its full name of World Wrestling Entertainment, although that remains the legal name of the company.

=== Storylines ===
The event comprised eight matches, including one on the pre-show, that resulted from scripted storylines. Results were predetermined by WWE's writers, while storylines were produced on WWE's weekly television shows, Raw and SmackDown.

The main rivalry heading into Hell in a Cell involved the WWE Championship. At Night of Champions, John Cena defeated Alberto Del Rio to become the ten-time WWE Champion. On the following night's episode of Raw SuperShow, WWE COO Triple H announced the first-ever Triple Threat Hell in a Cell match, in which Cena would defend his title against Alberto Del Rio and CM Punk, giving Punk the rematch clause he never received.

Another rivalry involved the World Heavyweight Championship. At Night of Champions, Mark Henry defeated Randy Orton to win the World Heavyweight Championship. On the following night's episode of Raw SuperShow, SmackDown General Manager Theodore Long announced that Orton would invoke his rematch clause at Hell in a Cell, and that the rematch would take place inside that structure.

== Event ==
Other on-screen personnel
| Role: | Name: |
|---|---|
| English Commentators | Michael Cole |
| English Commentators | Jim Ross |
| English Commentators | Booker T |
| Spanish Commentators | Carlos Cabrera |
| Spanish Commentators | Marcelo Rodríguez |
| Backstage interviewer | Josh Mathews |
| Ring announcers | Justin Roberts |
| Ring announcers | Tony Chimel |
| Referees | Drake Wuertz |
| Referees | Mike Chioda |
| Referees | Scott Armstrong |
| Referees | Justin King |

=== Preliminary matches ===
The actual pay-per-view opened with Christian facing Sheamus. In the end, Christian attempted a Spear on Sheamus, but Sheamus avoided it and Christian collided with the ring post. Sheamus performed a Brogue Kick on Christian to win the match.

Next, Sin Cara Azul faced Sin Cara Negro. Sin Cara Azul performed a Sunset Flip Powerbomb on Sin Cara Negro to win the match.

After that, Air Boom (Evan Bourne and Kofi Kingston) defended the WWE Tag Team Championship against Jack Swagger and United States Champion Dolph Ziggler. The match ended when Swagger attempted a Superbomb on Bourne, who countered into a Super Hurricanrana and pinned Swagger with a roll up to retain the titles.

In the fourth match, Mark Henry defended the World Heavyweight Championship against Randy Orton in a Hell in a Cell match. In the end, Orton performed an RKO on Henry for a near-fall. Orton attempted a Punt Kick on Henry, who countered the move into a World's Strongest Slam on Orton to retain the title. After the match, Henry performed a second World's Strongest Slam on Orton and retrieved a chair, placing Orton's leg in the chair. Henry attempted a Corner Slingshot Splash onto the chair, but Orton avoided the attempt and hit Henry with the chair, leading to Henry retreating.

WWE Intercontinental Champion Cody Rhodes cut a promo, introducing a new design for the Intercontinental Championship belt. John Laurinaitis interrupted Rhodes, announcing he would defend the WWE Intercontinental Championship against John Morrison. The impromptu match ended when Morrison attempted a Springboard Roundhouse Kick on Rhodes, who avoided the move and pinned Morrison with an Oklahoma Roll to retain the title.

In the sixth match, Kelly Kelly defended the Divas Championship against Beth Phoenix. Phoenix would target Kelly's lower back throughout the match by applying various submission holds and stretches. In the end of the match, Natalya hit Kelly with the microphone without the referee seeing it, giving Phoenix the opportunity to perform the Glam Slam on Kelly to win the title.

=== Main event ===
In the main event, John Cena defended the WWE Championship against Alberto Del Rio and CM Punk in a Triple Threat Hell in a Cell match. During the match, Del Rio performed a Belly to Back Suplex on Cena through a chair. Cena performed an Attitude Adjustment on Punk but Del Rio voided the pinfall. Del Rio applied the Cross Armbreaker on Cena but Punk broke up the hold. Punk performed a GTS on Cena but Del Rio pulled Punk out of the ring, voiding the pinfall. Del Rio pushed Punk, causing Punk to fall off the top rope through a table. Cena applied the STF on Del Rio but Ricardo Rodriguez opened the cell door and threw a lead pipe into the ring. Cena performed an Attitude Adjustment on Rodriguez outside the cell but Del Rio hit Cena with the lead pipe and locked the cell door. Punk attempted a GTS on Del Rio but Del Rio hit Punk with the lead pipe and pinned Punk to win the title.

After the match, Cena attacked Del Rio whilst the cell was being lowered. The Miz and R-Truth emerged from under the ring, attacking Punk, Cena, Del Rio, two referees and two cameramen. All the wrestlers, security officers, and COO Triple H attempted to enter the cell but the cell was locked. After the New Orleans Police Department appeared and attempted to enter the cell, a man with bolt cutters broke the lock. After Miz and R-Truth were arrested, Triple H attacked them.

== Aftermath ==
After Hell in a Cell, the feud between Christian and Sheamus continued over the next couple of weeks, they fought each other and a match was made between the two again at Vengeance, which Sheamus won.

The feud between the two Sin Caras ended on the following episode of SmackDown in a Mask vs. Mask Match, which Sin Cara Negro lost.

The feud over the WWE Tag Team Championships ended at Vengeance, which Evan Bourne and Kofi Kingston won.

The feud between Mark Henry and Randy Orton ended and Henry continued his feud with Big Show. At Capitol Punishment, during Big Show's match with Alberto Del Rio, Henry attacked Show before the match and put him through the announce table. A match between Big Show and Mark Henry was made at Money in the Bank. At Money in the Bank, Henry defeated Big Show. After the match, Henry attacked Big Show and injured Big Show's ankle, which put Big Show out of action for 3 months. On the SmackDown following Hell in the Cell, Big Show returned and attacked Henry. A match was set up between the two at Vengeance and it was for the World Heavyweight championship. At Vengeance during the match, Mark Henry superplexed Big Show and the ring collapsed, so it ended in a no contest. A match was set up at Survivor Series, Big Show won by disqualification. SmackDown general manager Teddy Long then made a match between Big Show and Henry at TLC and announced that it would be a Chairs Match. At TLC, Big Show won the World Heavyweight championship, but after the match Big Show was attacked by Henry which allowed Daniel Bryan to cash in his Money in the Bank contract and win the World Heavyweight championship. At the Royal Rumble, both Big Show and Mark Henry challenged Daniel Bryan for the World Heavyweight championship, which Bryan retained.

After Hell in a Cell, Cody Rhodes started a feud with former Legacy member, Randy Orton, which led to the match between the two at Vengeance, which Orton won after a RKO.

Kelly Kelly and Eve Torres faced Beth Phoenix and Natalya in a Tag Team match, Beth and Natalya won by disqualification after Eve and Kelly attacked them by throwing Natalya into the barricade and Beth being thrown into and hit on the announce table causing a disqualification.

At the conclusion of Hell in a Cell, The Miz and R-Truth came from under the ring and attacked Punk, Cena, and Del Rio to get revenge for being fired. All the wrestlers (faces and heels), security officers, and COO Triple H went to the Cell to get in, but it was locked. R-Truth knocked out both of the cameramen who were in the cell. A few minutes into the attack, the New Orleans Police Department showed up trying all they can to get in. A man with bolt cutters showed up, and they finally broke the lock. After Miz and Truth were arrested, WWE COO Triple H attacked Truth and Miz. The incident caused every wrestler, broadcaster, ring announcer, referee, and cameraman to all walk out on Triple H. The next week on Raw, Triple H cut a promo about the walkout. The only wrestlers that did not walk out were Sheamus, CM Punk, and John Cena. They all expressed the opinions. A match was set up between Sheamus and Cena with Triple H as referee, and CM Punk as the commentator, and the bell ringer. During the match, WWE Chairman Mr. McMahon interrupted it to tell Triple H that the WWE Board of Directors said that Triple H couldn't control Raw and named John Laurinaitis the new general manager. All the people that walked out, came back in the arena and congratulated the general manager. Laurinaitis then rehired The Miz and R-Truth and they attacked Triple H and CM Punk. A match was made at Vengeance, which put Triple H and CM Punk against The Miz and R-Truth, which Truth and Miz won thanks to the interference from Kevin Nash. Nash attacked Triple H with his sledgehammer. Triple H returned and attacked Nash, which led to their match at TLC in a ladder match. At TLC, Triple H defeated Nash.

== Results ==
| No. | Results | Stipulations | Times |
|---|---|---|---|
| 1^{D} | Daniel Bryan defeated JTG by pinfall | Singles match | 7:47 |
| 2 | Sheamus defeated Christian by pinfall | Singles match | 13:41 |
| 3 | Sin Cara Azul defeated Sin Cara Negro by pinfall | Singles match | 09:46 |
| 4 | Air Boom (Evan Bourne and Kofi Kingston) (c) defeated Dolph Ziggler and Jack Swagger (with Vickie Guerrero) by pinfall | Tag team match for the WWE Tag Team Championship | 11:20 |
| 5 | Mark Henry (c) defeated Randy Orton by pinfall | Hell in a Cell match for the World Heavyweight Championship | 15:59 |
| 6 | Cody Rhodes (c) defeated John Morrison by pinfall | Singles match for the WWE Intercontinental Championship | 07:20 |
| 7 | Beth Phoenix (with Natalya) defeated Kelly Kelly (c) (with Eve Torres) by pinfall | Singles match for the WWE Divas Championship | 08:32 |
| 8 | Alberto Del Rio (with Ricardo Rodriguez) defeated John Cena (c) and CM Punk by pinfall | Triple Threat Hell in a Cell match for the WWE Championship | 24:20 |
(c) / – the champion(s) heading into the match; D / – this was a dark match
