= Hell in a Cell =

Professional wrestling match type

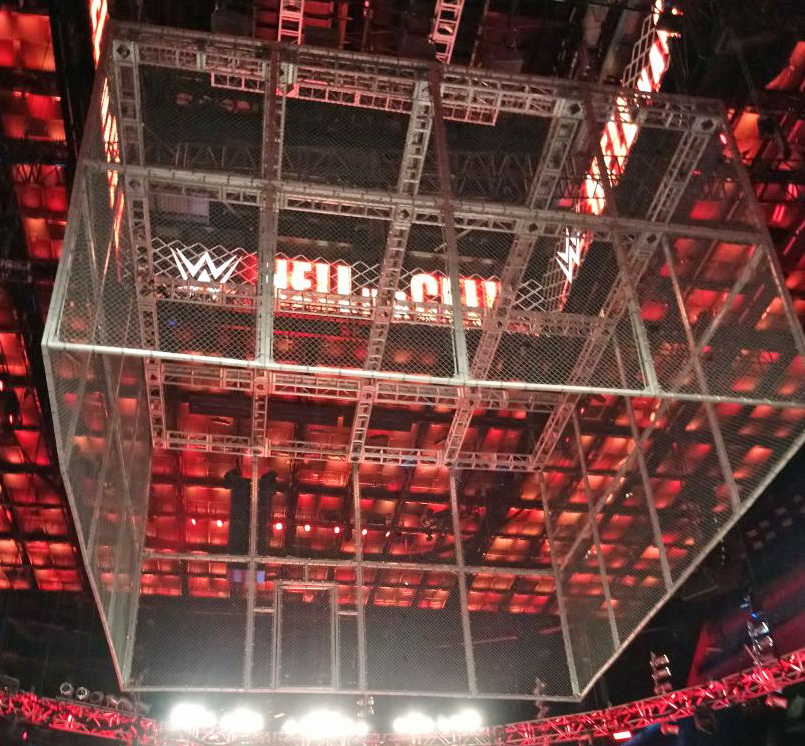
The Hell in a Cell structure at the Hell in a Cell event in October 2017

Hell in a Cell is a professional wrestling steel cage-based match which originated in 1997 in the World Wrestling Federation (WWF, now WWE). It features a large cell structure, a four-sided cuboid made from open-weave steel mesh chain-link fencing which encloses the ring and ringside area. Unlike the steel cage match, the only way to get out of the Hell in a Cell without damaging the Cell's structure is through its door—but this door is locked by thick chains and a padlock. Only an in-ring pinfall or submission will ordinarily result in a win (although Triple H pinned Chris Jericho atop the cell to win the Hell in a Cell match at Judgment Day in May 2002) and there are no disqualifications. The gimmick was strongly associated with The Undertaker during his career with WWF/WWE, including the inaugural match with Shawn Michaels and a brutal encounter with Mick Foley in his Mankind persona. Both matches featured spectacular falls from the top of the cage which has since become a signature of the match. A Hell in a Cell match is often the most prestigious type of match in the WWE, often saved for the end of a feud that is usually the most popular feud over a months-long period.

The original Cell was 16 ft (4.9 m) high and weighed over two tons, but has since been replaced by a more robust version of 20 ft (6.1 m) and five tons. The first match took place at Bad Blood In Your House in October 1997 and a total of 53 Hell in a Cell matches have since occurred. The match type spawned its own pay-per-view event in 2009, WWE Hell in a Cell, after which the event was held annually in October, although once in September and twice in June. This event generally featured one to three Hell in a Cell matches on the same card, with the main event always contested as a Hell in a Cell match. Following Triple H's appointment as WWE Chief Content Officer in August 2022, the Hell in a Cell annual event was discontinued alongside other gimmick PPVs except for WWE Money in the Bank, Royal Rumble, Survivor Series, and WWE Elimination Chamber.

== History ==
The Hell in a Cell match was first introduced at Badd Blood on Sunday October 5, 1997, at the Kiel Center, now known as Enterprise Center, in St. Louis, Missouri. The background to the inaugural match was built on The Undertaker's loss to Bret Hart two months prior at SummerSlam in a WWF Championship match which Shawn Michaels was assigned to referee. Michaels had deliberately interjected himself in the match and cost The Undertaker a win which resulted in a match between the two at In Your House: Ground Zero. That match was ruled a no-contest due to the two bypassing and attacking the officials. As a climactic end to the feud, their following bout was originally scheduled to be held as a steel cage match. However, a larger roofed structure was constructed instead of a normal cage enclosing only the ring, enclosing not only the ring but also the surrounding ringside area. The wider space between the ring apron and the cell walls allowed for entering and exiting the ring and for cameras to be situated at ringside. At Badd Blood, Michaels defeated The Undertaker (with interference from The Undertaker's debuting half-brother Kane), becoming the number-one contender to the WWF Championship at the 1997 Survivor Series. The original concept for the Hell in a Cell structure is rumored to have been created by Jim Cornette. He described his concept as a combination of a cage surrounding the majority of the ringside area (the design, he stated, was popular in Memphis wrestling promotions) and the cage used in both the National Wrestling Alliance and World Championship Wrestling for their WarGames matches (which had a top on the cage). However, The Undertaker and Shawn Michaels have also taken credit for the original concept. On an October 2015 video podcast, Vince Russo said Cornette probably did come up with the concept, but the name Hell in a Cell came from him. WWE credits the match as being based on the Last Battle of Atlanta.

The 1998 Hell in a Cell match between The Undertaker and Mankind at the WWF King of the Ring remains one of the most iconic matches of all time, with its level of extreme violence and dangerous spots, which led to Mankind getting legitimately knocked unconscious at the end of the match and suffering multiple injuries towards the end of the match. Despite the match's popularity, it remains controversial due to the wrestler's lack of safety. In 2011, this incident was named the number one "OMG!" incident in WWE history. Journalist Michael Landsberg called it "maybe the most famous match ever." The first title defense in Hell in a Cell was at No Way Out in February 2000 with Triple H defending the WWF Championship against Cactus Jack. The first title change inside Hell in a Cell was in October 2009, when The Undertaker won the World Heavyweight Championship from CM Punk. The longest Hell in a Cell match was held at Bad Blood in June 2004 between Triple H and Shawn Michaels at over 47 minutes. The Undertaker has been involved in the most Hell in a Cell matches, having competed in fourteen and having the most victories at eight. All Hell in a Cell matches have been broadcast live on pay-per-view except for five matches, three of which were televised on Raw Is War, later Monday Night Raw, with two in 1998 and one in 2021 and one on Friday Night SmackDown also in 2021. The Hell in a Cell match on the June 15 episode of Raw Is War showcasing Stone Cold Steve Austin and The Undertaker against Kane and Mankind, ended with Austin and Undertaker winning after Raw Is War went off the air. On the August 24 episode of Raw Is War, Mankind fought Kane (his tag team partner at the time) in a Hell in a Cell match. This match went to a no-contest after Austin interfered and assaulted Kane. On the June 18, 2021, episode of Friday Night SmackDown, the first non-PPV title match contested inside the structure took place between Roman Reigns and Rey Mysterio for the WWE Universal Championship which saw Reigns retain the title via submission. Three days later on the June 21, 2021, episode of Monday Night Raw, WWE Champion Bobby Lashley faced Xavier Woods in a non-title Hell in a Cell match which saw Lashley win via submission. These matches, along with the two matches at the Hell in a Cell event, were held in a span of 4 days, with Lashley being the only wrestler to have competed in Hell in a Cell matches on back-to-back days. Only one Hell in a Cell match was not televised, the match took place on the September 26 episode of Raw in 2011 as a dark match where John Cena retained the WWE Championship in a five-way match against Alberto Del Rio, Jack Swagger, Dolph Ziggler, and CM Punk in a match that lasted only 5 minutes, making it the shortest Hell in a Cell match. Hell in a Cell matches have appeared at WWF/WWE's flagship event WrestleMania four times (XV, XXVIII, 32, and 39). In 2009, WWE debuted its first pay-per-view event to be named Hell in a Cell.

In 2016, Charlotte Flair and Sasha Banks became the first women to step inside the Hell in a Cell match at Hell in a Cell in October 2016 when Banks defended the Raw Women's Championship against Flair, who won the match.

Ahead of Hell in a Cell in September 2018, the structure went through a significant overhaul. The fully crimson-red structure is smaller, with the wires being less pliable, making the structure stronger, yet lighter. Randy Orton and Jeff Hardy faced off against each other in the first crimson cell, a match which Orton won. The crimson cell would be swapped out for the standard gray one come WrestleMania 39 in 2023.

=== Kennel from Hell match/Other appearances and variations ===
The structure itself has made four additional appearances, although WWE does not consider them to be Hell in a Cell matches. During the first-ever First Blood match which was between Kane and Stone Cold Steve Austin at King of the Ring in June 1998, the cell used earlier in the night was lowered. The second featured Big Boss Man challenging Al Snow for the WWF Hardcore Championship in a Kennel from Hell match at Unforgiven in September 1999. The match consisted of a standard steel cage with the cell placed atop it and the object was to escape from both the cage and cell while trying to avoid guard dogs that were placed between the ring and cell door. Snow, the first competitor to escape the steel cage and the cell, was declared the winner. The third time was on September 28, 2009, episode of Raw during a gauntlet match with John Cena against Chris Jericho, Big Show and Randy Orton. The cell was lowered after Cena defeated Jericho and Big Show by disqualification when Orton's turn came. Cena ordered the cell to be lowered and then brawled Orton on top of the structure. The match was declared a no-contest. The fourth time was on October 20, 2014, episode of Raw when the Hell in a Cell structure was lowered on orders from Kane during a handicap street fight involving Kane, Orton, and Seth Rollins against Cena and Dean Ambrose which Kane, Orton, and Rollins won. At Hell in a Cell in October 2017, Shane McMahon and Kevin Owens competed in a Hell in a Cell match billed as the first under Falls Count Anywhere rules (despite the Hell in a Cell previously having this stipulation in its rules by default). In October 2020, Roman Reigns and Jey Uso competed in the first-ever Hell in a Cell match contested under an "I quit" stupulation.

== Reception ==
The first Hell in a Cell match in 1997 between The Undertaker and Shawn Michaels was highly acclaimed, with Dave Meltzer giving it 5 stars. As the match became more common, critics claimed that the concept was being overused, particularly during the 2010s. Former WWE producer Arn Anderson said in 2020 that too many feuds had culminated in a Hell in a Cell match despite not justifying a match of that caliber. In 2024, prior to a Hell in a Cell match against Drew McIntyre, CM Punk stated that he hoped to revitalize the match's brutality and quality, saying, "I don't want to have a cell that needs a match. I want to have a match that needs the cell."

Heavy criticism was directed at the finish of the 2019 match between Seth Rollins and "The Fiend" Bray Wyatt after it became the first Hell in a Cell match to end via referee stoppage.

Hell in a Cell matches have been less frequent in the 2020s, particularly since the discontinuation of the Hell in a Cell event. The event was last held in 2022, where Rollins and Cody Rhodes competed in the second Hell in a Cell match to be rated 5 stars by Meltzer. This feat was also achieved by the Punk–McIntyre match at Bad Blood 2024.

== List of Hell in a Cell matches ==
Number	Match	Stipulations	Event	Date	Venue	Location	Length
1	Shawn Michaels defeated The Undertaker	Singles match to determine the number one contender for the WWF Championship at Survivor Series	Badd Blood: In Your House	October 5, 1997	Kiel Center	St. Louis, Missouri	30:00
2	The Undertaker and Stone Cold Steve Austin defeated Mankind and Kane	Tornado tag team match	Raw Is War	June 15, 1998	Freeman Coliseum	San Antonio, Texas	10:38
3	The Undertaker defeated Mankind	Singles match	King of the Ring	June 28, 1998	Pittsburgh Civic Arena	Pittsburgh, Pennsylvania	17:10
4	Mankind vs. Kane ended in a no contest	Singles match	Raw Is War	August 24, 1998	CoreStates Center	Philadelphia, Pennsylvania	7:41
5	The Undertaker defeated Big Boss Man	Singles match	WrestleMania XV	March 28, 1999	First Union Center	Philadelphia, Pennsylvania	9:48
6	Triple H (c) defeated Cactus Jack	Singles match for the WWF Championship; Since Cactus Jack lost, he had to retire as an active wrestler in the WWF	No Way Out	February 27, 2000	Hartford Civic Center	Hartford, Connecticut	23:57
7	Kurt Angle (c) defeated The Undertaker, Triple H, Stone Cold Steve Austin, Rikishi, and The Rock	Six-man match for the WWF Championship	Armageddon	December 10, 2000	Birmingham-Jefferson Convention Complex Arena	Birmingham, Alabama	32:12
8	Triple H defeated Chris Jericho	Singles match	Judgment Day	May 19, 2002	Gaylord Entertainment Center	Nashville, Tennessee	24:06
9	Brock Lesnar (c) defeated The Undertaker	Singles match for the WWE Championship	No Mercy	October 20, 2002	Alltel Arena	North Little Rock, Arkansas	27:18
10	Triple H (c) defeated Kevin Nash	Singles match for the World Heavyweight Championship with Mick Foley as the special guest referee	Bad Blood	June 15, 2003	Compaq Center	Houston, Texas	21:01
11	Triple H defeated Shawn Michaels	Singles match	Bad Blood	June 13, 2004	Nationwide Arena	Columbus, Ohio	47:26
12	Batista (c) defeated Triple H	Singles match for the World Heavyweight Championship	Vengeance	June 26, 2005	Thomas & Mack Center	Paradise, Nevada	26:54
13	The Undertaker defeated Randy Orton	Singles match	Armageddon	December 18, 2005	Dunkin' Donuts Center	Providence, Rhode Island	31:31
14	D-Generation X (Triple H and Shawn Michaels) defeated Mr. McMahon, Shane McMahon and Big Show	Two-on-three handicap match This also marked the debut of the amplified version of the cell	Unforgiven	September 17, 2006	Air Canada Centre	Toronto, Canada	25:04
15	Batista (c) defeated The Undertaker	Singles match for the World Heavyweight Championship	Survivor Series	November 18, 2007	American Airlines Arena	Miami, Florida	21:24
16	The Undertaker defeated Edge	Singles match	SummerSlam	August 17, 2008	Conseco Fieldhouse	Indianapolis, Indiana	26:43
17	The Undertaker defeated CM Punk (c)	Singles match for the World Heavyweight Championship	Hell in a Cell	October 4, 2009	Prudential Center	Newark, New Jersey	10:24
18	Randy Orton defeated John Cena (c)	Singles match for the WWE Championship	Hell in a Cell	October 4, 2009	Prudential Center	Newark, New Jersey	21:24
19	D-Generation X (Triple H and Shawn Michaels) defeated The Legacy (Cody Rhodes and Ted DiBiase)	Tornado tag team match	Hell in a Cell	October 4, 2009	Prudential Center	Newark, New Jersey	17:48
20	Randy Orton (c) defeated Sheamus	Singles match for the WWE Championship	Hell in a Cell	October 3, 2010	American Airlines Center	Dallas, Texas	22:51
21	Kane (c) defeated The Undertaker	Singles match for the World Heavyweight Championship	Hell in a Cell	October 3, 2010	American Airlines Center	Dallas, Texas	21:38
22	John Cena (c) defeated Alberto Del Rio, CM Punk, Dolph Ziggler, and Jack Swagger	Five-man match for the WWE Championship	Raw (dark match)	September 26, 2011	Sprint Center	Kansas City, Missouri	5:01
23	Mark Henry (c) defeated Randy Orton	Singles match for the World Heavyweight Championship	Hell in a Cell	October 2, 2011	New Orleans Arena	New Orleans, Louisiana	15:54
24	Alberto Del Rio defeated John Cena (c) and CM Punk	Triple threat match for the WWE Championship	Hell in a Cell	October 2, 2011	New Orleans Arena	New Orleans, Louisiana	24:07
25	The Undertaker defeated Triple H	Singles match with Shawn Michaels as the special guest referee	WrestleMania XXVIII	April 1, 2012	Sun Life Stadium	Miami Gardens, Florida	30:52
26	CM Punk (c) defeated Ryback	Singles match for the WWE Championship	Hell in a Cell	October 28, 2012	Philips Arena	Atlanta, Georgia	11:22
27	CM Punk defeated Ryback and Paul Heyman	Two-on-one handicap match	Hell in a Cell	October 27, 2013	American Airlines Arena	Miami, Florida	13:48
28	Randy Orton defeated Daniel Bryan	Singles match for the vacant WWE Championship with Shawn Michaels as the special guest referee	Hell in a Cell	October 27, 2013	American Airlines Arena	Miami, Florida	22:07
29	John Cena defeated Randy Orton	Singles match to determine the number one contender for the WWE World Heavyweight Championship	Hell in a Cell	October 26, 2014	American Airlines Center	Dallas, Texas	25:52
30	Seth Rollins defeated Dean Ambrose	Singles match	Hell in a Cell	October 26, 2014	American Airlines Center	Dallas, Texas	14:00
31	Roman Reigns defeated Bray Wyatt	Singles match	Hell in a Cell	October 25, 2015	Staples Center	Los Angeles, California	23:08
32	Brock Lesnar defeated The Undertaker	Singles match	Hell in a Cell	October 25, 2015	Staples Center	Los Angeles, California	18:10
33	The Undertaker defeated Shane McMahon	Singles match Had Shane McMahon won, he would have gained control of Raw and Undertaker would have been barred from competing at WrestleMania again	WrestleMania 32	April 3, 2016	AT&T Stadium	Arlington, Texas	30:08
34	Roman Reigns (c) defeated Rusev	Singles match for the WWE United States Championship	Hell in a Cell	October 30, 2016	TD Garden	Boston, Massachusetts	24:35
35	Kevin Owens (c) defeated Seth Rollins	Singles match for the WWE Universal Championship	Hell in a Cell	October 30, 2016	TD Garden	Boston, Massachusetts	23:15
36	Charlotte Flair defeated Sasha Banks (c)	Singles match for the WWE Raw Women's Championship	Hell in a Cell	October 30, 2016	TD Garden	Boston, Massachusetts	22:25
37	The Usos (Jimmy Uso and Jey Uso) defeated The New Day (Big E and Xavier Woods) (c)	Tornado tag team match for the WWE SmackDown Tag Team Championship	Hell in a Cell	October 8, 2017	Little Caesars Arena	Detroit, Michigan	22:00
38	Kevin Owens defeated Shane McMahon	Falls Count Anywhere match	Hell in a Cell	October 8, 2017	Little Caesars Arena	Detroit, Michigan	39:00
39	Randy Orton defeated Jeff Hardy	Singles match	Hell in a Cell	September 16, 2018	AT&T Center	San Antonio, Texas	24:50
40	Roman Reigns (c) vs. Braun Strowman ended in a no contest	Singles match for the WWE Universal Championship with Mick Foley as the special guest referee This was also Strowman's Money in the Bank cash-in match which was scheduled in advance	Hell in a Cell	September 16, 2018	AT&T Center	San Antonio, Texas	24:10
41	Becky Lynch (c) defeated Sasha Banks	Singles match for the WWE Raw Women's Championship	Hell in a Cell	October 6, 2019	Golden 1 Center	Sacramento, California	21:50
42	Seth Rollins (c) vs. "The Fiend" Bray Wyatt ended in a match stoppage	Singles match for the WWE Universal Championship	Hell in a Cell	October 6, 2019	Golden 1 Center	Sacramento, California	17:30
43	Roman Reigns (c) defeated Jey Uso	"I Quit" match for the WWE Universal Championship	Hell in a Cell	October 25, 2020	Amway Center	Orlando, Florida	29:20
44	Sasha Banks defeated Bayley (c)	Singles match for the WWE SmackDown Women's Championship	Hell in a Cell	October 25, 2020	Amway Center	Orlando, Florida	26:35
45	Randy Orton defeated Drew McIntyre (c)	Singles match for the WWE Championship	Hell in a Cell	October 25, 2020	Amway Center	Orlando, Florida	30:35
46	Roman Reigns (c) defeated Rey Mysterio	Singles match for the WWE Universal Championship	Friday Night SmackDown	June 18, 2021	Yuengling Center	Tampa, Florida	16:00
47	Bianca Belair (c) defeated Bayley	Singles match for the WWE SmackDown Women's Championship	Hell in a Cell	June 20, 2021	Yuengling Center	Tampa, Florida	19:45
48	Bobby Lashley (c) defeated Drew McIntyre	Last Chance match for the WWE Championship	Hell in a Cell	June 20, 2021	Yuengling Center	Tampa, Florida	25:45
49	Bobby Lashley defeated Xavier Woods	Singles match	Monday Night Raw	June 21, 2021	Yuengling Center	Tampa, Florida	13:40
50	Edge defeated Seth Rollins	Singles match	Crown Jewel	October 21, 2021	Mohammed Abdu Arena	Riyadh, Saudi Arabia	27:40
51	Cody Rhodes defeated Seth "Freakin" Rollins	Singles match	Hell in a Cell	June 5, 2022	Allstate Arena	Rosemont, Illinois	24:20
52	Edge defeated "The Demon" Finn Bálor	Singles match	WrestleMania 39	April 2, 2023	SoFi Stadium	Inglewood, California	18:10
53	CM Punk defeated Drew McIntyre	Singles match	Bad Blood	October 5, 2024	State Farm Arena	Atlanta, Georgia	31:25
54	Oba Femi defeated Brock Lesnar	Singles match	SummerSlam	August 1, 2026	U.S. Bank Stadium	Minneapolis, Minnesota	11:40

=== Participant list ===
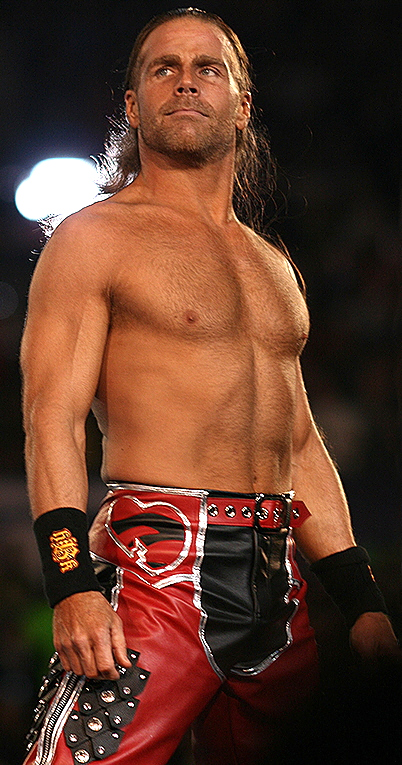
Shawn Michaels was the inaugural winner in October 1997 and would later appear in 3 more Hell in a Cell matches, winning two of them.

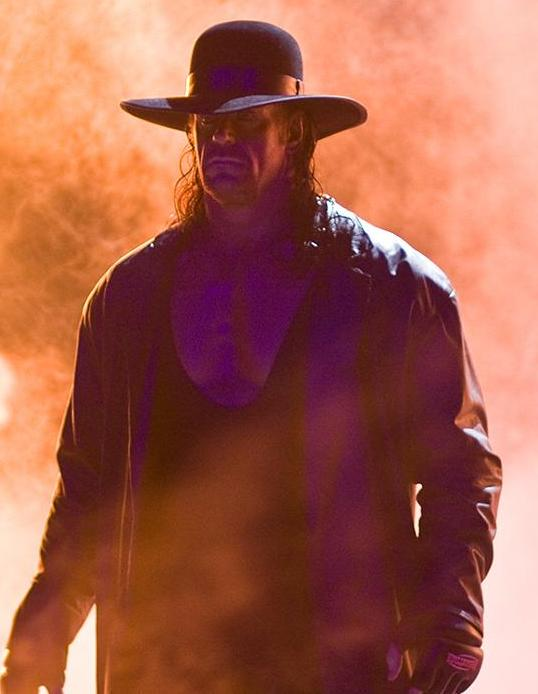
The Undertaker holds the record for both the most wins at 8 and the most Hell in a Cell matches with 14, with his final appearance being a win against Shane McMahon at WrestleMania 32 in April 2016

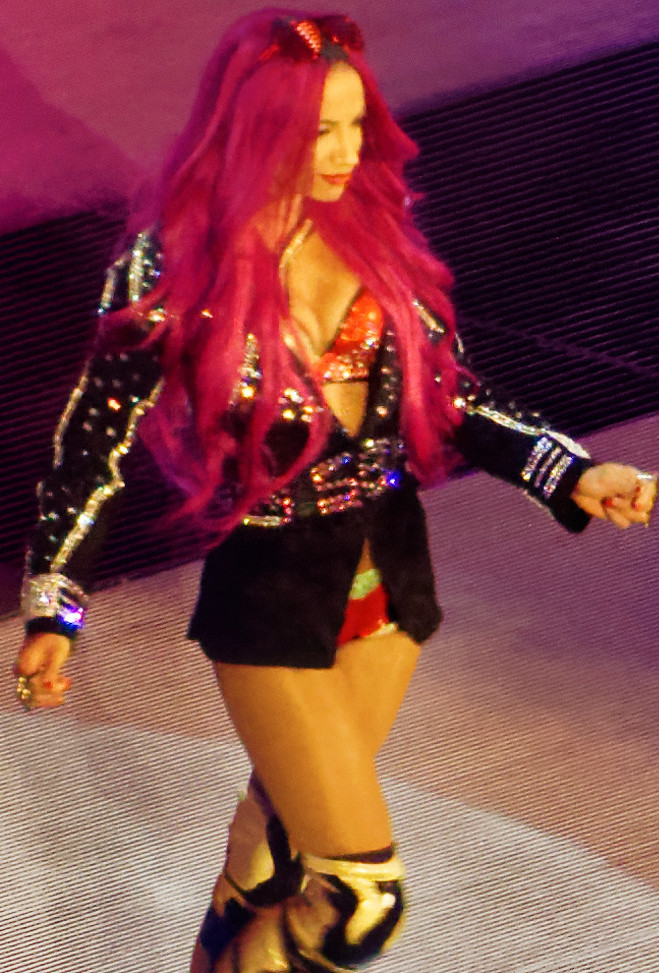
Sasha Banks holds the record for most women's Hell in a Cell match appearances with 3, she has only won one Hell in a Cell match

==== Men's Division ====
Wrestler	Victories	Appearances
The Undertaker	8	14
Triple H	6	9
Randy Orton	5	8
Roman Reigns	4	5
Shawn Michaels	3	4
CM Punk	3	6
Batista	2	2
Kevin Owens	2	2
Bobby Lashley	2	2
Edge	2	3
Brock Lesnar	2	3
John Cena	2	4
Kurt Angle	1	1
Mark Henry	1	1
Jimmy Uso	1	1
Oba Femi	1	1
Stone Cold Steve Austin	1	2
Alberto Del Rio	1	2
Jey Uso	1	2
Cody Rhodes	1	2
Kane	1	3
Seth Rollins	1	5
Big Boss Man	0	1
Rikishi	0	1
The Rock	0	1
Chris Jericho	0	1
Kevin Nash	0	1
Mr. McMahon	0	1
Big Show	0	1
Ted DiBiase	0	1
Sheamus	0	1
Dolph Ziggler	0	1
Jack Swagger	0	1
Paul Heyman	0	1
Daniel Bryan	0	1
Dean Ambrose	0	1
Rusev	0	1
Big E	0	1
Jeff Hardy	0	1
Braun Strowman	0	1
Rey Mysterio	0	1
Finn Bálor	0	1
Ryback	0	2
Bray Wyatt/"The Fiend"	0	2
Xavier Woods	0	2
Shane McMahon	0	3
Drew McIntyre	0	3
Mankind/Cactus Jack	0	4

==== Women's Division ====
Wrestler	Victories	Appearances
Charlotte Flair	1	1
Becky Lynch	1	1
Bianca Belair	1	1
Sasha Banks	1	3
Bayley	0	2

== See also ==
- Elimination Chamber
