= Last Battle of Atlanta =

Professional wrestling match

The Last Battle of Atlanta
- Date: October 23, 1983
- Venue: Omni Coliseum

Kayfabe
Wrestler		Tommy Rich	Buzz Sawyer
Nickname		Wildfire	Mad Dog

Working
Performer		Thomas Richardson	Bruce Alan Woyan
- Promotion(s): Georgia Championship Wrestling
- Position: 7th on the card
- Stipulation(s): Steel Cage

Result
- Time: 12:06
- Tommy Rich defeats Buzz Sawyer

The Last Battle of Atlanta was a professional wrestling match between Tommy Rich and Buzz Sawyer, of Georgia Championship Wrestling (GCW). The un-televised match took place at the Omni Coliseum in Atlanta, Georgia on October 23, 1983. WWE credits the match as the basis for the Hell in a Cell match.

The match took place in a steel cage, however unlike traditional steel cage matches, this match had a roof on it. Due to the roof on the cage, escaping the cage was not an option, the match could have only been won by pinfall or when competitor could not answer the 10 count. Sawyer's manager Paul Ellering would be locked inside of his own separate cage. The stipulation of the match stated that Ole Anderson would immediately face Ellering if Rich were to win. Rich pinned Sawyer at the 12:06 mark. After the match, Ellering came into the ring in order to check on Sawyer, however Anderson immediately came out for their match.

For many years the footage of this match was considered to be the "holy grail" and was believed to not exist. In 2012 the WWE stated that only a few pictures exist from the event. Although it was believed to have not been filmed, the video wound up in the World Championship Wrestling (WCW) library, however it remained on its original reel and was kept unlabeled. WCW's assets were purchased by the World Wrestling Federation in 2001, and footage entered the WWE library unmarked. In September 2016 however, the match was uploaded to the WWE Network, with the remainder of the event added in October 2018.
