= Hell in a Cell (2018) =

WWE pay-per-view and livestreaming event

- Promotional poster featuring Braun Strowman, Roman Reigns and the Hell in a Cell structure.
- Promotion: WWE
- Brand(s): Raw; SmackDown
- Date: September 16, 2018
- City: San Antonio, Texas
- Venue: AT&T Center
- Attendance: 15,216

WWE event chronology
← Previous; SummerSlam	Next → Super Show-Down

Hell in a Cell chronology
← Previous; 2017	Next → 2019

The 2018 Hell in a Cell was a professional wrestling pay-per-view (PPV) and livestreaming event produced by WWE, held for wrestlers from the promotion's main roster brands, Raw and SmackDown. It was the 10th annual Hell in a Cell event and took place on September 16, 2018, at the AT&T Center in San Antonio, Texas. The event centered on the Hell in a Cell match, a 20-foot-high roofed steel cage that surrounds the ring and ringside area with no countouts or disqualifications and the only way to win is by pinfall or submission in the ring.

Eight matches were contested at the event, including one on the Kickoff pre-show. There were two Hell in a Cell matches, including the main event which saw Roman Reigns defend Raw's Universal Championship against Braun Strowman with Mick Foley as the special guest referee, but the match ended in a no-contest after Brock Lesnar returned and attacked both men, rendering them unable to continue. This was also Strowman's Money in the Bank cash-in match that was scheduled in advance, which subsequently made it the first cash in to fail by a no-contest ruling. In the other Hell in a Cell match, which was the opening bout and a featured match from SmackDown, Randy Orton defeated Jeff Hardy. In other prominent matches, AJ Styles controversially retained SmackDown's WWE Championship against Samoa Joe, Becky Lynch defeated Charlotte Flair to win the SmackDown Women's Championship, and Ronda Rousey defeated Alexa Bliss to retain the Raw Women's Championship.

This was the third Hell in a Cell event to be held in the U.S. state of Texas, as the 2010 and 2014 events were both held in Dallas. This was also the first and only Hell in a Cell event held in September as all other editions were held in October until 2021 when it was moved up to June. The 2018 event was originally planned to be held exclusively for SmackDown, like the previous year, and it was originally scheduled to be held on September 30 at the Bridgestone Arena in Nashville, Tennessee, but following the discontinuation of brand-exclusive PPV and livestreaming events for the main roster under the second brand split after WrestleMania 34 in April, the schedule was shifted with Hell in a Cell taking the originally planned date and location of Extreme Rules, which got moved up to July. This also made it the first Hell in a Cell since 2010 to feature multiple brands during a brand split. The event also saw a redesign to the Hell in a Cell structure, which became slightly smaller and entirely painted red.

== Production ==
=== Background ===
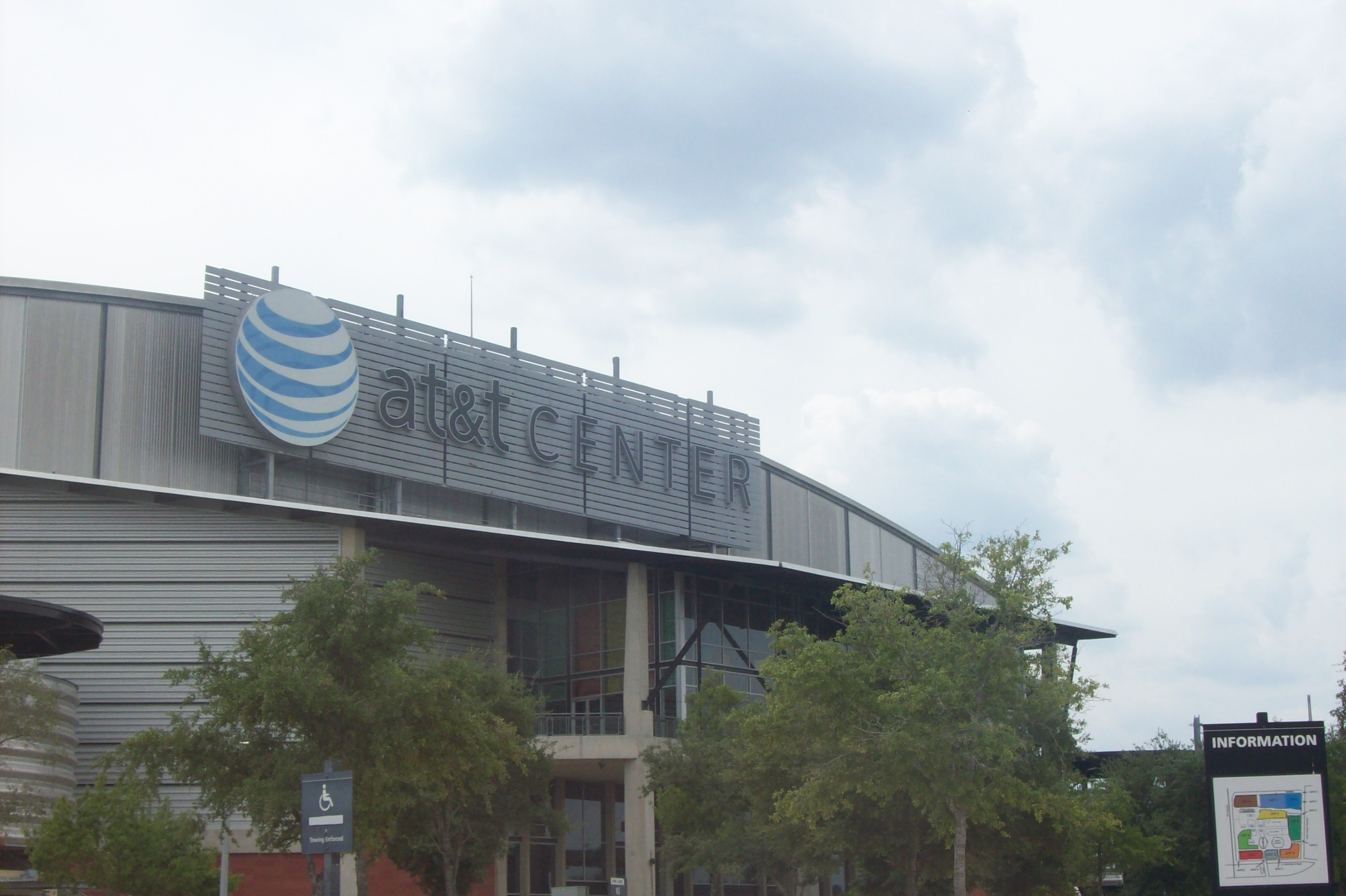
The 10th annual Hell in a Cell event was held at the AT&T Center in San Antonio, Texas.

Hell in a Cell was an annual professional wrestling event originally produced every October by WWE since 2009. It was originally broadcast exclusively via pay-per-view (PPV) before it began simultaneously livestreaming on the WWE Network in 2014. The concept of the event came from WWE's established Hell in a Cell match, in which competitors fought inside a 20-foot-high roofed cell structure surrounding the ring and ringside area. The main event match of the card was contested under the Hell in a Cell stipulation. For 2018, the structure was redesigned, as it was entirely painted crimson-red and became smaller, with the wires being less pliable, making the structure stronger, yet lighter.

On November 22, 2017, the 10th Hell in a Cell event was originally announced to be held on September 30, 2018, at the Bridgestone Arena in Nashville, Tennessee, marking the first Hell in a Cell held in September, and it was to be held exclusively for wrestlers from SmackDown, like the 2017 event. However, following the discontinuation of brand-exclusive PPV and livestreaming events for the main roster after WrestleMania 34 in April, the event was subsequently moved up by two weeks to September 16 with a new location of the AT&T Center in San Antonio, Texas and featured wrestlers from both Raw and SmackDown. The event's new date and location was originally planned for Extreme Rules, which got moved up to July after the schedule was shifted as a result of the discontinuation of brand-exclusive PPV and livestreaming events for the main roster. This was also the first Hell in a Cell since 2010 to feature multiple brands during a brand split. Tickets went on sale on June 29 through Ticketmaster.

=== Storylines ===
The event comprised eight matches, including one on the Kickoff pre-show, that resulted from scripted storylines. Results were predetermined by WWE's writers on the Raw and SmackDown brands, while storylines were produced on WWE's weekly television shows, Monday Night Raw and SmackDown Live.

At SummerSlam, Roman Reigns defeated Brock Lesnar to win the Universal Championship. Before the match began, Money in the Bank contract winner Braun Strowman came out and declared that he would be cashing-in on the winner of the match and stayed at ringside. Strowman, however, was incapacitated by Lesnar during the match, preventing him from cashing in; this distraction allowed Reigns to defeat Lesnar to win the championship. The next night on Raw, Strowman once again attempted to cash-in after Reigns's successful title defense, but was stopped by Dean Ambrose and Seth Rollins coming to the aid of Reigns, reforming The Shield. The following week, Strowman confronted Reigns and announced that he would be cashing-in at Hell in a Cell inside the namesake structure so that Ambrose and Rollins could not interfere. On the September 10 episode, Mick Foley was named as the special guest referee for the match.

At SummerSlam, during the WWE Championship match between Samoa Joe and defending champion AJ Styles, Joe taunted Styles by disrespecting his wife and daughter, who were seated in the front row. An irate Styles attacked Joe with a steel chair, resulting in Joe winning by disqualification, but Styles retaining the title. On the following SmackDown, Joe attacked Styles from behind during an interview, and continued to disrespect Styles' family. On August 24, a title rematch was scheduled for Hell in a Cell.

At SummerSlam, after the referee was incapacitated, The Miz attacked Daniel Bryan with a pair of brass knuckles handed by his wife, Maryse, who was seated in the front row. After the referee came back to his senses, Miz pinned Bryan to win the match. On the following SmackDown, Miz and Maryse mocked Bryan's retirement speech from two years earlier. Bryan and his wife Brie Bella came out and confronted them. Bryan called Miz a coward for having to cheat to win and said that SmackDown General Manager Paige approved of a mixed tag team match pitting Bryan and Brie against Miz and Maryse at Hell in a Cell.

On August 26, Paige scheduled two triple threat tag team matches, with the winners facing each other to determine who would face The New Day (Kofi Kingston, Big E, and Xavier Woods) for the SmackDown Tag Team Championship at Hell in a Cell. Cesaro and Sheamus won the first triple threat match by defeating Luke Gallows and Karl Anderson and The Colóns (Primo and Epico) on the August 28 episode. Rusev and Aiden English won the second triple threat match by defeating The Usos (Jey Uso and Jimmy Uso) and Sanity's Eric Young and Killian Dain on the September 4 episode, thus setting up Cesaro and Sheamus vs. Rusev and English for the September 11 episode, which was won by Rusev and English. The match was then scheduled for the Kickoff pre-show.

At SummerSlam, Ronda Rousey defeated Alexa Bliss to win the Raw Women's Championship. On the August 27 episode of Raw, Bliss announced that she would be invoking her championship rematch clause at Hell in a Cell.

At Backlash, Jeff Hardy defeated Randy Orton to retain the United States Championship. At Extreme Rules, after Hardy lost the United States Championship to Shinsuke Nakamura, Orton attacked Hardy. Two days later on the July 17 episode of SmackDown, Hardy had a rematch with Nakamura, but it ended in a draw after Orton attacked Hardy. The following week, Orton explained his attacks on Hardy by stating that he felt disrespected by the fans and hated how they were supportive of wrestlers like Hardy. The next week, Orton launched a third attack on Hardy with assistance from Nakamura. Hardy invoked his rematch clause at SummerSlam, and would once again fail to regain the title. After the match, Orton came out while Hardy was incapacitated in the ring, only to turn back and walk away. On the following episode of SmackDown, Orton and Hardy had a match that ended in disqualification after Hardy low-blowed Orton. Hardy then proceeded to attack Orton all around the arena and eventually spread in the crowd area. Hardy then executed a "Swanton Bomb" on Orton off the balcony through a table. The following week, Hardy challenged Orton to a Hell in a Cell match at the namesake event, which Orton accepted.

At SummerSlam, Charlotte Flair defeated Becky Lynch and defending champion Carmella in a triple threat match to capture the SmackDown Women's Championship. After the match, Lynch turned heel and attacked Flair. Over the following weeks, Lynch and Flair confronted and attacked each other. On the September 4 episode of SmackDown, a match between Lynch and Flair for the title was scheduled for Hell in a Cell.

On the August 27 episode of Raw, Dolph Ziggler and Drew McIntyre lost to Roman Reigns and Braun Strowman via disqualification when they beat down Reigns, who was not legal. Strowman then sided with Ziggler and McIntyre, and also overpowered Reigns's Shield members, Seth Rollins and Dean Ambrose. The following week, Ziggler and McIntyre won the Raw Tag Team Championship. After a successful title defense on the September 10 episode, Ziggler and McIntyre were scheduled to defend the titles against Ambrose and Rollins at Hell in a Cell.

== Event ==
Other on-screen personnel
Role:	Name:
English commentators	Michael Cole (Raw)
English commentators	Corey Graves (Raw/Smackdown)
English commentators	Renee Young (Raw)
English commentators	Tom Phillips (SmackDown)
English commentators	Byron Saxton (SmackDown)
Spanish commentators	Carlos Cabrera
Spanish commentators	Marcelo Rodríguez
German commentators	Carsten Schaefer
German commentators	Calvin Knie
Ring announcers	Greg Hamilton (SmackDown)
Ring announcers	JoJo (Raw)
Referees	Danilo Anfibio
Referees	Jason Ayers
Referees	Shawn Bennett
Referees	Dan Engler
Referees	Mick Foley
Referees	Ryan Tran
Referees	Rod Zapata
Interviewers	Charly Caruso
Interviewers	Kayla Braxton
Pre-show panel	Jonathan Coachman
Pre-show panel	Paige
Pre-show panel	Booker T
Pre-show panel	Peter Rosenberg
Pre-show panel	David Otunga

=== Pre-show ===
During the Hell in a Cell Kickoff pre-show, The New Day (Big E and Kofi Kingston) (accompanied by Xavier Woods) defended the SmackDown Tag Team Championship against Rusev Day (Rusev and Aiden English) (accompanied by Lana). In the climax, Kingston performed "Trouble in Paradise" on English to retain the titles.

=== Preliminary matches ===
The actual pay-per-view opened with Jeff Hardy facing Randy Orton in a Hell in a Cell match. During the match, Orton threaded a screwdriver through Hardy's earlobe. Hardy would then counter with a low blow. Hardy performed a "Twist of Fate" on Orton, then placed a chair on him and performed a "Swanton Bomb" on Orton for a near-fall. In the climax, Hardy climbed a ladder and grabbed onto the top of the cell. Dangling from the cell, Hardy attempted a splash on Orton through a table, only for Orton to move, causing Hardy to crash through the table. Orton pinned Hardy to win the match.

Next, Charlotte Flair defended the SmackDown Women's Championship against Becky Lynch. In the climax, as Flair attempted a spear, Lynch countered and pinned Flair to win the title for a record tying second time. After the match, Flair offered a handshake, only for Lynch to refuse.

After that, Dolph Ziggler and Drew McIntyre defended the Raw Tag Team Championship against Seth Rollins and Dean Ambrose. In the end, as Rollins had Ziggler up for the "Falcon Arrow", McIntyre performed a "Claymore Kick" on Rollins, and Ziggler fell on top of Rollins to pin him and retain the titles.

In the fourth match, AJ Styles defended SmackDown's WWE Championship against Samoa Joe. The closing moments saw Styles attempt a springboard only for Joe to counter into the "Coquina Clutch". Styles countered this into a pin, but during the pin, Styles submitted. The referee did not see Styles submit and counted the pinfall for Styles to controversially retain. After the match, an irate Joe attacked Styles as he felt he had won the match.

Next, Daniel Bryan and his wife Brie Bella faced The Miz and his wife Maryse in a mixed tag team match. In the end, Maryse pinned Bella with a roll up whilst holding Bella's tights to win.

In the penultimate match, Ronda Rousey (accompanied by Natalya) defended the Raw Women's Championship against Alexa Bliss (accompanied by Mickie James and Alicia Fox). Throughout the match, Bliss focused on Rousey's injured ribs, but Rousey stayed in the fight. In the climax, when Bliss taunted Rousey, Rousey performed a gutwrench powerbomb and followed up with strikes in the corner. As Bliss went for a right hand, Rousey blocked and followed up with "Piper's Pit". Rousey forced Bliss to submit to an armbar to retain the title.

Before the main event, SmackDown general manager Paige informed an enraged Samoa Joe backstage that he would get his rematch against AJ Styles for the WWE Championship in a No Disqualification, No Countout match at Super Show-Down.

=== Main event ===
In the main event, Roman Reigns defended Raw's Universal Championship against Braun Strowman in a Hell in a Cell match with Mick Foley as the special guest referee, which was also Strowman's Money in the Bank cash-in match. During the match, Reigns performed two superman punches, but as he went for a third, Strowman intercepted him with a chokeslam for a nearfall. Reigns then performed a pop-up superman punch on Strowman for a nearfall. Reigns set up a table and ran around the ring, but Strowman knocked him out with the steel steps. Back inside the ring, Strowman bashed the steps in Reigns' midsection and performed a running powerslam on Reigns for a nearfall. As Strowman attempted a running powerslam on Reigns through the table, which was positioned in the corner, Reigns slipped out and followed up with two superman punches and a Spear on Strowman through the table for a nearfall. Afterwards, Dolph Ziggler and Drew McIntyre attempted to interfere, only for Seth Rollins and Dean Ambrose to intercept McIntyre and Ziggler. Atop the cell, Ziggler performed a superkick on Rollins. Ambrose struck McIntyre and Ziggler with a kendo stick. Rollins and Ziggler fell off the cell through the announce tables. In the climax, Brock Lesnar (with Paul Heyman) made a surprise return. Lesnar kicked in the cell door while Heyman incapacitated Foley with pepper spray. Lesnar then attacked both Strowman and Reigns with broken pieces of a table and performed F-5s on each man before departing. A second referee came out and declared that Strowman and Reigns could not continue, resulting in a no-contest, thus Reigns retained the title. Strowman became the fourth person to fail in gaining a championship in their cash-in match, and the first to fail by a no-contest ruling.

== Aftermath ==
The 2018 event would be the only Hell in a Cell to take place in the month of September, as the following year's event returned Hell in a Cell to its regular October slot. In 2021, however, the series was moved up to June until the event's discontinuation in 2023.

=== Raw ===
The following night on Raw, Universal Champion Roman Reigns stated that Brock Lesnar was owed a rematch, but didn't think he'd do what he did at Hell in a Cell. Reigns called out Lesnar, but got Strowman instead. Strowman then stated that Lesnar was the reason that Reigns was still the champion. Afterwards, acting general manager Baron Corbin interrupted, and informed Reigns that he would be defending the title against Lesnar and Strowman in a triple threat match at Crown Jewel. However, Corbin noted how banged up Reigns was from Hell in a Cell, and earned himself a title match against Reigns, which was scheduled for that episode's main event. The match initially ended in a disqualification win for Reigns after Corbin struck him with a chair, only for Corbin to restart the match under no disqualification rules. Strowman and Raw Tag Team Champions Drew McIntyre and Dolph Ziggler tried to interfere, only for Seth Rollins and Dean Ambrose to intercept them and allow Reigns to pin Corbin to retain. The animosity between the two teams continued to heat up, and at Super Show-Down, The Shield (Reigns, Ambrose, and Rollins) defeated Strowman, McIntyre, and Ziggler. On the October 22 episode, however, Reigns announced that his leukemia, which had been in remission since late 2008, had legitimately relapsed. This turned the scheduled triple threat match into a singles match between Lesnar and Strowman for the vacant title. Later that night, Rollins and Ambrose faced McIntyre and Ziggler in a rematch for the Raw Tag Team Championship, where Rollins and Ambrose were victorious. Afterwards, Ambrose turned on Rollins.

Also on Raw, after Drew McIntyre defeated Dean Ambrose, Baron Corbin asked Dolph Ziggler if he would be invoking his championship rematch clause against Intercontinental Champion Seth Rollins. If Rollins was unable to compete, he would have been stripped of the title, which would have been awarded to Ziggler. Rollins did show up, and retained against Ziggler.

=== SmackDown ===
On SmackDown, new SmackDown Women's Champion Becky Lynch talked about her win over Charlotte Flair. Flair interrupted to pay her respect to Lynch, but told her that she paid a big price by throwing away their friendship, and hyped their rematch at Super Show-Down. After they talked trash, they engaged in a brawl, with Lynch standing tall in the end.

Also on SmackDown, The Miz revealed that he would be facing Daniel Bryan in a rematch from SummerSlam at Super Show-Down, where the winner would be the new number one contender for the WWE Championship. The two then brawled, with Bryan accidentally sending The Miz into his wife, Maryse, before calling him a "coward".

Rusev told Aiden English backstage that he didn't need him for the United States Championship match. Later that night, during the match, English distracted Rusev, costing him the match. Afterwards, English turned on Rusev.

Following WWE Champion AJ Styles' win over Andrade "Cien" Almas, Samoa Joe attacked Styles, resulting in a brawl which ended with Joe poking Styles in the eye, furthering the heat between Styles and Joe heading into their rematch at Super Show-Down.

== Results ==
No.	Results	Stipulations	Times
1^{P}	The New Day (Big E and Kofi Kingston) (c) (with Xavier Woods) defeated Rusev Day (Aiden English and Rusev) (with Lana) by pinfall	Tag team match for the WWE SmackDown Tag Team Championship	8:55
2	Randy Orton defeated Jeff Hardy by pinfall	Hell in a Cell match	24:50
3	Becky Lynch defeated Charlotte Flair (c) by pinfall	Singles match for the WWE SmackDown Women's Championship	13:50
4	Dolph Ziggler and Drew McIntyre (c) defeated Dean Ambrose and Seth Rollins by pinfall	Tag team match for the WWE Raw Tag Team Championship	24:52
5	AJ Styles (c) defeated Samoa Joe by pinfall	Singles match for the WWE Championship	19:00
6	The Miz and Maryse defeated Daniel Bryan and Brie Bella by pinfall	Mixed tag team match	13:00
7	Ronda Rousey (c) (with Natalya) defeated Alexa Bliss (with Alicia Fox and Mickie James) by submission	Singles match for the WWE Raw Women's Championship	12:02
8	Roman Reigns (c) vs. Braun Strowman ended in a no contest	Hell in a Cell match for the WWE Universal Championship with Mick Foley as special guest referee This was Strowman's Money in the Bank cash-in match.	24:10
(c) / – the champion(s) heading into the match; P / – the match was broadcast on the pre-show
