= SummerSlam (2018) =

WWE pay-per-view and livestreaming event

- Promotional poster featuring Brock Lesnar, Alexa Bliss, Ronda Rousey, and Roman Reigns
- Promotion: WWE
- Brand(s): Raw; SmackDown; 205 Live
- Date: August 19, 2018
- City: Brooklyn, New York
- Venue: Barclays Center
- Attendance: 16,169

WWE event chronology
← Previous; NXT TakeOver: Brooklyn 4	Next → Hell in a Cell

SummerSlam chronology
← Previous; 2017	Next → 2019

The 2018 SummerSlam was a professional wrestling pay-per-view (PPV) and livestreaming event produced by WWE, held for wrestlers from the promotion's main roster brands, Raw, SmackDown, and 205 Live. It was the 31st annual SummerSlam and took place on August 19, 2018, at the Barclays Center in the New York City borough of Brooklyn, New York. This was the fourth and final consecutive SummerSlam event to take place at the arena. It was also the first SummerSlam since 2009 to feature three brands.

Thirteen matches were contested at the event, including three on the Kickoff pre-show. Nine matches, including two on the Kickoff pre-show, were championship matches. In the main event, Roman Reigns defeated Brock Lesnar to win Raw's Universal Championship, ending Lesnar's 504-day reign (although WWE officially recognizes it as 503 days). In the penultimate match, Ronda Rousey defeated Alexa Bliss to win the Raw Women's Championship, becoming the first woman to win a women's championship in both the Ultimate Fighting Championship and WWE. In other prominent matches, The Miz defeated Daniel Bryan, Samoa Joe defeated SmackDown's WWE Champion AJ Styles by disqualification but did not win the championship as titles do not change hands by disqualification unless stipulated, and in the opening bout, Seth Rollins defeated Dolph Ziggler to regain Raw's Intercontinental Championship. This was also the first SummerSlam to not feature John Cena since 2003.

== Production ==
=== Background ===
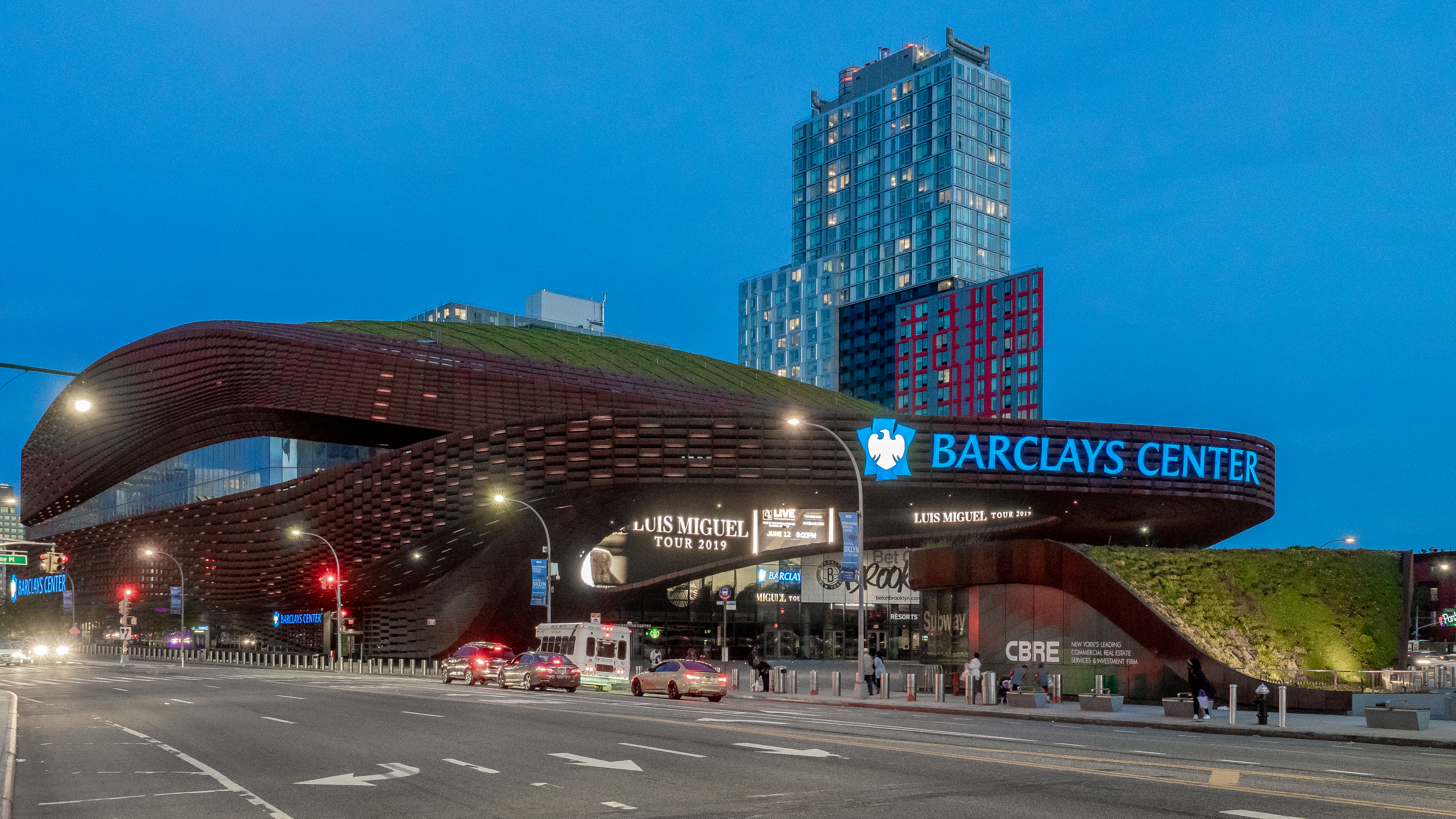
The 31st annual SummerSlam was the fourth and final consecutive time for the event to be held at the Barclays Center in Brooklyn, New York.

SummerSlam is an annual professional wrestling event produced every August by WWE since 1988. It was originally broadcast exclusively via pay-per-view (PPV) before it began simultaneously livestreaming on the WWE Network in 2014. Dubbed "The Biggest Party of the Summer", it is one of the promotion's original four PPVs, along with WrestleMania, Royal Rumble, and Survivor Series, referred to as the "Big Four". It has since become considered WWE's second biggest event of the year behind WrestleMania. Announced on August 14, 2017, the 31st SummerSlam was scheduled to be held on August 19, 2018, at the Barclays Center in the New York City borough of Brooklyn, New York for the fourth consecutive year. It featured wrestlers from the Raw, SmackDown, and 205 Live brand divisions, which was the first SummerSlam since 2009 to feature three brands. Tickets went on sale on February 2 through Ticketmaster.

=== Storylines ===
The event comprised 13 matches, including three on the Kickoff pre-show, that resulted from scripted storylines. Results were predetermined by WWE's writers on the Raw, SmackDown, and 205 Live brands, with storylines produced on WWE's weekly television shows, Monday Night Raw, SmackDown Live, and the cruiserweight-exclusive 205 Live.

==== Raw ====
As Universal Champion Brock Lesnar refused to defend the title at Extreme Rules, Raw General Manager Kurt Angle gave him an ultimatum: defend the title or be stripped of it. On the Raw after Extreme Rules, Lesnar's advocate Paul Heyman agreed that Lesnar would defend the title at SummerSlam. Bobby Lashley, Drew McIntyre, Seth Rollins, Elias, Finn Bálor, and Roman Reigns all wanted an opportunity. In response, Angle scheduled two triple threat matches that night, with the winners facing each other the following week to determine Lesnar's challenger. Reigns won the first triple threat match over Bálor and McIntyre, while Lashley won the second over Elias and Rollins. The following week, Reigns defeated Lashley. Lesnar and Heyman then faked a break up before ambushing Reigns on the final Raw before SummerSlam.

After retaining her title against Nia Jax at Extreme Rules in an Extreme Rules match, Raw Women's Champion Alexa Bliss gloated that she had beaten every woman on the Raw roster. Ronda Rousey, whom she had cost a championship match at Money in the Bank and who had been suspended, came out from the crowd and attacked Bliss and Mickie James. Raw General Manager Kurt Angle extended Rousey's suspension for another week, and also awarded her a title match at SummerSlam, provided that she would not break her suspension again.

At Extreme Rules, Kevin Owens defeated Braun Strowman in a Steel Cage match after Strowman threw Owens from the top of the cage onto the broadcast table. On the July 23 episode of Raw, Owens vowed to take everything away from Strowman. A rematch was scheduled for SummerSlam with a stipulation that if Owens won, even by disqualification or countout, he would win Strowman's Money in the Bank contract.

At Extreme Rules, Dolph Ziggler defeated Seth Rollins 5–4 in sudden death overtime of a 30-minute Iron Man match to retain the Intercontinental Championship, thanks to interference from Ziggler's tag team partner, Drew McIntyre. On the July 23 episode of Raw, a rematch between Ziggler and Rollins for the title was scheduled for SummerSlam with McIntyre in Ziggler's corner. During the contract signing on the August 13 episode, Dean Ambrose returned from injury, confirming he would be in Rollins' corner.

At Extreme Rules, Finn Bálor defeated Baron Corbin. A few weeks later, a rematch between the two was scheduled, with Corbin defeating Bálor. The following week, another match between the two was scheduled for SummerSlam.

On the August 13 episode of Raw, The B-Team (Bo Dallas and Curtis Axel) retained the Raw Tag Team Championship in a triple threat tag team match against Matt Hardy and Bray Wyatt and The Revival (Dash Wilder and Scott Dawson) when they pinned Wyatt. Afterwards, The B-Team was scheduled to defend the championship against The Revival on the SummerSlam Kickoff pre-show.

==== SmackDown ====
On the July 24 episode of SmackDown, SmackDown General Manager Paige was about to reveal AJ Styles's opponent for the WWE Championship at SummerSlam when James Ellsworth tried to claim the contendership. Paige fired him and saw him being kicked out of the building, when Samoa Joe attacked Styles with the "Coquina Clutch" and then signed the contract.

On July 21, Paige scheduled a tag team title tournament with the winning team earning the right to challenge The Bludgeon Brothers (Harper and Rowan) for the SmackDown Tag Team Championship at SummerSlam. The tournament began on the July 24 episode of SmackDown with The New Day (represented by Big E and Xavier Woods) and Cesaro and Sheamus advancing to the finals by defeating SAnitY (Alexander Wolfe and Killian Dain) and The Usos (Jey Uso and Jimmy Uso), respectively. The New Day (represented by Big E and Kingston) then defeated Cesaro and Sheamus in the finals to face The Bludgeon Brothers for the titles at SummerSlam.

On the July 24 episode of SmackDown, Becky Lynch defeated SmackDown Women's Champion Carmella in a non-title match to earn the right to challenge for the title at SummerSlam. The following week, Charlotte Flair returned and saved Lynch from an attack by Carmella. The same night, Flair defeated Carmella and was subsequently added to the title match, making it a triple threat match.

At Extreme Rules, Shinsuke Nakamura defeated Jeff Hardy to capture the United States Championship after a pre-match low blow. A rematch between the two for the title was scheduled for the following SmackDown which Hardy won by disqualification after he was attacked by Randy Orton. On August 3, another match between the two for the title was scheduled for SummerSlam.

In the first season of NXT in 2010, The Miz served as the "WWE Pro" of "NXT Rookie" Daniel Bryan. Throughout the season, Miz constantly berated Bryan, claiming he was not WWE material and expressing his displeasure at Bryan being his Rookie. The feeling was mutual as Bryan regularly alluded to the fact that he had been wrestling longer than Miz, stating that he should be the Pro and Miz should be the Rookie. On the May 11 episode of NXT, Bryan was eliminated from the show. The following week after his elimination, Bryan attacked The Miz and Michael Cole on NXT. The two would then feud over the United States Championship, which Bryan won from Miz at Night of Champions. Six years later, on the August 23, 2016, episode of Talking Smack, Bryan (then General Manager of SmackDown) got into a verbal altercation with The Miz, which consisted of Bryan criticizing Miz's wrestling ability and "safe style" of wrestling. The Miz responded by going on a rant about Bryan being unable to return to in-ring competition due to the various injuries he had sustained throughout his WWE career. From this point forward, Bryan and Miz had sporadic interactions for over a year. On March 20, 2018, Bryan was medically cleared to return to in-ring competition by doctors, after which he resumed his feud with The Miz. On the July 31 episode of SmackDown, Bryan challenged Miz to a match at SummerSlam. Miz initially declined the match, stating that he has always been above Bryan going back to NXT season one, and recommended that Bryan return to the independent circuit once his WWE contract expired. However, the following week, The Miz accepted Bryan's SummerSlam challenge.

On the July 24 episode of SmackDown, Andrade "Cien" Almas defeated Rusev. The following week, Zelina Vega defeated Lana. A rematch between Vega and Lana was scheduled the following week, with Vega winning again. On August 11, a mixed tag team match between Rusev and Lana and Almas and Vega was scheduled for SummerSlam Kickoff pre-show.

==== 205 Live ====
On the July 24 episode of 205 Live, Drew Gulak earned the right to challenge Cedric Alexander for the WWE Cruiserweight Championship by winning a fatal four-way match. On July 30, the match between Alexander and Gulak for the title was scheduled for SummerSlam. Brian Kendrick and Gentleman Jack Gallagher were banned from ringside for the match.

== Event ==
Other on-screen personnel
Role:	Name:
English commentators	Michael Cole (Raw matches)
English commentators	Corey Graves (Raw/SmackDown matches)
English commentators	Jonathan Coachman (Raw matches)
English commentators	Tom Phillips (SmackDown matches)
English commentators	Byron Saxton (SmackDown matches)
English commentators	Vic Joseph (205 Live match)
English commentators	Nigel McGuinness (205 Live match)
English commentators	Percy Watson (205 Live match)
Spanish commentators	Carlos Cabrera
Spanish commentators	Marcelo Rodríguez
Spanish commentators	Jerry Soto
German commentators	Carsten Schaefer
German commentators	Calvin Knie
Ring announcers	Greg Hamilton (205 Live/SmackDown matches)
Ring announcers	JoJo (Raw matches)
Referees	Danilo Anfibio
Referees	Jason Ayers
Referees	Mike Chioda
Referees	John Cone
Referees	Dan Engler
Referees	Darrick Moore
Referees	Chad Patton
Referees	Charles Robinson
Referees	Rod Zapata
Interviewers	Renee Young
Interviewers	Charly Caruso
Pre-show panel	Renee Young
Pre-show panel	Booker T
Pre-show panel	Sam Roberts
Pre-show panel	David Otunga
Pre-show panel	Jerry Lawler
Pre-show correspondents	Peter Rosenberg
Pre-show correspondents	John "Bradshaw" Layfield

=== Pre-show ===
Three matches occurred on the SummerSlam Kickoff pre-show. In the first match, Andrade "Cien" Almas and Zelina Vega faced Rusev and Lana. In the climax, Vega pinned Lana with a roll-up using the ring ropes as leverage to win the match.

Next, Cedric Alexander defended the WWE Cruiserweight Championship against Drew Gulak. In the end, Alexander pinned Gulak with a roll-up to retain the title.

After that, The B-Team (Bo Dallas and Curtis Axel) defended the Raw Tag Team Championship against The Revival (Scott Dawson and Dash Wilder). In the end, as Dawson attempted to pin Axel with a small package, Dallas fell onto Axel, reversing the small package and pinning Dawson to retain the titles.

=== Preliminary matches ===
The actual pay-per-view opened with Dolph Ziggler (accompanied by Drew McIntyre) defending Raw's Intercontinental Championship against Seth Rollins, accompanied by Dean Ambrose. McIntyre sent Ambrose into the steel steps at ringside, distracting Rollins and allowing Ziggler to perform a "Zig Zag" on Rollins for a nearfall. In the end, as McIntyre attempted to interfere, Ambrose performed "Dirty Deeds" on McIntyre. Rollins performed a superkick and "The Stomp" on Ziggler to regain the title for a second time.

Next, The Bludgeon Brothers (Harper and Rowan) defended the SmackDown Tag Team Championship against The New Day's Big E and Xavier Woods, accompanied by Kofi Kingston. The match ended when Rowan struck Woods and Big E with a mallet, thus The New Day won by disqualification, however, The Bludgeon Brothers retained the titles.

After that, Braun Strowman defended his Money in the Bank contract against Kevin Owens, with the stipulation that Strowman could lose the contract by any means. In the end, Strowman chokeslammed Owens onto the steel stage ramp. Strowman then rolled Owens back into the ring and performed a running powerslam on Owens to retain the contract and end the feud.

In the fourth match, Carmella defended the SmackDown Women's Championship against Charlotte Flair and Becky Lynch. The ending saw Lynch apply the "Dis-Arm-Her" on Carmella, only for Flair to sneak behind & attack Lynch from behind with the "Natural Selection" for the pinfall to win the title to tie Trish Stratus' record, winning her seventh women's championship. After the match, Lynch attacked Flair, turning heel.

Next, AJ Styles defended SmackDown's WWE Championship against Samoa Joe. In the climax, as Joe continued to taunt Styles' wife and child, who were in attendance at ringside, an irate Styles tackled Joe through the barricade. Styles then attacked security personnel and struck Joe with a chair, causing a disqualification, thus Joe won the match, however, Styles retained the title.

Next, Elias promised a concert. As he was about to start, the guitar broke. He then discarded the guitar pieces and then departed backstage.

Next, Daniel Bryan faced The Miz. In the end, Miz's wife Maryse, who was seated in the front row, handed Miz a pair of brass knuckles that the referee did not see. As Bryan attempted a suicide dive, Miz struck Bryan with the object and tossed the object back to Maryse. Afterwards, Miz rolled Bryan back in the ring and pinned him to win the match.

After that, "The Demon" Finn Bálor faced Baron Corbin. Bálor performed a clothesline on Corbin sending him over the top rope. Bálor performed a Sling Blade followed by a dropkick on Corbin. In the climax, Bálor performed a "Coup de Grâce" on Corbin to win the match.

Later, Shinsuke Nakamura defended SmackDown's United States Championship against Jeff Hardy. In the end, Hardy attempted a "Swanton Bomb" on the ring apron onto Nakamura, but Nakamura moved, causing Hardy to land on the edge of the ring canvas. Nakamura then got Hardy back in the ring and performed a "Kinshasa" to retain the title. After the match, Randy Orton appeared, teasing an attack on Hardy, but left immediately afterwards.

In the penultimate match, Alexa Bliss defended the Raw Women's Championship against "Rowdy" Ronda Rousey. Natalya made her entrance first to be in Rousey's corner, and she wore her father Jim Neidhart's jacket to the ring, who had died a few days prior. Rousey dominated the entire match while Bliss mounted almost no offense at all. At the start, Bliss backed into the ropes twice and the referee forced Rousey to step back to the middle of the ring. Bliss left the ring twice but avoided a countout at a 5-count both times. After returning to the ring, Bliss applied a sleeper hold, but Rousey escaped and performed Piper's Pit to Bliss. Bliss then rolled out of the ring, leaving it for a third time, until Rousey chased her back in, avoiding another countout at a 6-count. Afterwards, Rousey blocked a right hand before performing another Piper's Pit. Finally, Rousey forced Bliss to submit to an armbar to win the title, becoming the first woman to win a championship in both the Ultimate Fighting Championship (UFC) and WWE, as well as the second person overall after Brock Lesnar. After the match, Rousey celebrated with Natalya and The Bella Twins (Nikki Bella and Brie Bella).

=== Main event ===
In the main event, Brock Lesnar (with Paul Heyman) defended Raw's WWE Universal Championship against Roman Reigns. Before the match began, Braun Strowman showed up, stating his intention to cash in his Money in the Bank contract on the winner and remaining at ringside. As soon as the match began, Reigns surprised Lesnar with three Superman Punches and three Spears. Lesnar performed a Guillotine Choke twice, but Reigns reversed it into a Spinebuster twice. Lesnar avoided a fourth Superman Punch and performed three German Suplexes on Reigns. As Lesnar attempted an F-5, Reigns reversed it into a fourth Spear attempt, but Lesnar avoided it and Reigns performed a Suicide Dive on Strowman at ringside by accident. There, Lesnar performed an F-5 on Strowman. Lesnar attacked Strowman with the Money in the Bank briefcase, throwing it to the entrance stage. In the climax, Lesnar attacked Strowman with a chair, preventing the cashing in after the match, but Reigns took advantage of the distraction and performed a fourth Spear for a pinfall (because while Lesnar returned to the ring with the chair to attack Reigns and get a DQ, Lesnar was still looking at Strowman), winning his first WWE Universal Championship and ending Lesnar's reign at 504 days.

== Aftermath ==
=== Raw ===
On the following episode of Raw, new Universal Champion Roman Reigns made an open challenge, but announced that he specifically wanted to face Finn Bálor, as he was the inaugural champion who had to relinquish the title due to injury, but never received a rematch. Bálor accepted and Reigns retained the title. After the match, Braun Strowman attacked Reigns and attempted to cash in his Money in the Bank contract, but was intercepted by Reigns' colleagues from The Shield (Seth Rollins and Dean Ambrose). The Shield performed their signature triple powerbomb on Strowman through an announce table. Also that episode, Paul Heyman confronted General Manager Kurt Angle about Brock Lesnar's contractual rematch, wanting it to occur at Hell in a Cell. Angle said that it was himself who decided about the time of the rematch and that Lesnar would not receive his rematch for a long time. According to Ambrose, the original plan was to reunite the Shield at SummerSlam, attacking Lesnar and helping Reigns to win the title, but Lesnar asked Vince McMahon to change the storyline. The following week, Strowman confronted Reigns and announced that he would be cashing-in at Hell in a Cell inside the namesake structure so that Ambrose and Rollins could not interfere. WWE Hall of Famer Mick Foley would later be named the special guest referee for the match. Also on the August 27 episode, Reigns teamed with Strowman to take on Ziggler and McIntyre. After Strowman tagged in, McIntyre and Ziggler attacked Reigns, and Strowman joined the beatdown. Rollins and Ambrose tried to help Reigns, but were overpowered, as well. This would also lead to a six-man tag team match pitting The Shield against Strowman, McIntyre, and Ziggler at Super Show-Down. At Hell in a Cell, Reigns and Strowman's match ended in a no-contest after interference from Lesnar. This would set up a triple threat match between Reigns, Lesnar, and Strowman for the Universal Championship at Crown Jewel.

Dean Ambrose with new Intercontinental Champion Seth Rollins also had a match against Dolph Ziggler. Rollins took out McIntyre, allowing Ambrose to defeat Ziggler.

A championship celebration with all of the women of Raw and Raw Commissioner Stephanie McMahon occurred for new Raw Women's Champion Ronda Rousey. Stephanie tried to take credit for Rousey being in WWE and subsequently becoming champion, but Rousey said her win was for all women, not for herself or for Stephanie. Rousey then applied the armbar to Stephanie. The following week, Alexa Bliss invoked her championship rematch clause for Hell in a Cell.

Raw Tag Team Champions The B-Team (Curtis Axel and Bo Dallas) took on The Revival (Scott Dawson and Dash Wilder) in back-to-back singles matches, where Dawson defeated Dallas and Wilder defeated Axel. The following week, The Revival defeated The B-Team. A title match between the two teams was scheduled for the September 3 episode, but The B-Team were attacked backstage by Dolph Ziggler and Drew McIntyre, who went on to become the new champions.

=== SmackDown ===
WWE Champion AJ Styles was interviewed about his match against Samoa Joe. He explained that he did not regret what he did to Joe, but was upset that he lost the match due to his actions. He warned Joe to never talk about his family again. Joe then attacked Styles from behind. On August 24, a rematch between the two was scheduled for Hell in a Cell.

The New Day received a SmackDown Tag Team Championship rematch against The Bludgeon Brothers in a No Disqualification match. Xavier Woods and Kofi Kingston represented The New Day and defeated The Bludgeon Brothers to become three-time SmackDown Tag Team Champions.

The Miz faked a retirement speech by saying that he was retired from facing Daniel Bryan ever again. Bryan came out and called Miz a coward for having to cheat to win. He then said that General Manager Paige approved a mixed tag team match pitting himself and his wife Brie Bella against The Miz and his wife Maryse at Hell in a Cell. It was also announced that The Miz and Bryan would have a rematch at Super Show-Down, with the winner earning a future WWE Championship match.

Becky Lynch explained her reasoning for attacking new SmackDown Women's Champion Charlotte Flair after the triple threat match. She claimed that she realized Charlotte had been holding her back the whole time and was not really her friend. Charlotte came out and the two brawled. Former champion Carmella was granted her rematch for the following week, where Flair retained. After the match, Lynch attacked Flair again. On the September 4 episode, a title match between Flair and Lynch was made official for Hell in a Cell.

Becky Lynch's heel turn at SummerSlam would change her career. The storyline would go all the way to the main event of WrestleMania 35 on April 8, 2019, where Lynch defeated Charlotte Flair and Ronda Rousey in a winner takes all triple threat match to win the Raw and SmackDown women's championships.

Jeff Hardy faced Randy Orton in a singles match, which ended in Orton winning by disqualification. After the match, they brawled into the crowd, where Hardy attacked Orton with steel chairs and a camera, then performed a "Swanton Bomb" on Orton through a table. The following week, Hardy challenged Orton to a Hell in a Cell match at Hell in a Cell, and Orton accepted.

Rusev and Lana received a rematch against Andrade Cien Almas and Zelina Vega, where they won after Aiden English prevented Almas from using a steel chair.

=== 205 Live ===
Drew Gulak claimed that Cedric Alexander got lucky in retaining the WWE Cruiserweight Championship and demanded a rematch, but was denied by 205 Live General Manager Drake Maverick.

== Results ==
No.	Results	Stipulations	Times
1^{P}	Andrade "Cien" Almas and Zelina Vega defeated Lana and Rusev by pinfall	Mixed tag team match	7:00
2^{P}	Cedric Alexander (c) defeated Drew Gulak by pinfall	Singles match for the WWE Cruiserweight Championship	10:15
3^{P}	The B-Team (Bo Dallas and Curtis Axel) (c) defeated The Revival (Dash Wilder and Scott Dawson) by pinfall	Tag team match for the WWE Raw Tag Team Championship	6:15
4	Seth Rollins (with Dean Ambrose) defeated Dolph Ziggler (c) (with Drew McIntyre) by pinfall	Singles match for the WWE Intercontinental Championship	22:00
5	The New Day (Big E and Xavier Woods) (with Kofi Kingston) defeated The Bludgeon Brothers (Harper and Rowan) (c) by disqualification	Tag team match for the WWE SmackDown Tag Team Championship	9:45
6	Braun Strowman defeated Kevin Owens by pinfall	Singles match for Strowman's Money in the Bank contract	1:50
7	Charlotte Flair defeated Carmella (c) and Becky Lynch by pinfall	Triple threat match for the WWE SmackDown Women's Championship	15:15
8	Samoa Joe defeated AJ Styles (c) by disqualification	Singles match for the WWE Championship	22:45
9	The Miz defeated Daniel Bryan by pinfall	Singles match	23:30
10	"The Demon" Finn Bálor defeated Baron Corbin by pinfall	Singles match	1:35
11	Shinsuke Nakamura (c) defeated Jeff Hardy by pinfall	Singles match for the WWE United States Championship	11:00
12	Ronda Rousey defeated Alexa Bliss (c) by submission	Singles match for the WWE Raw Women's Championship	4:00
13	Roman Reigns defeated Brock Lesnar (c) (with Paul Heyman) by pinfall	Singles match for the WWE Universal Championship	6:10
(c) / – the champion(s) heading into the match; P / – the match was broadcast on the pre-show

=== SmackDown Tag Team Championship #1 Contender's Tournament ===
1st Round; SmackDown; July 24–31, 2018
The New Day (Big E and Xavier Woods)	Pinfall
SAnitY (Alexander Wolfe and Killian Dain)	7:55
The Usos (Jey Uso and Jimmy Uso)	13:55
The Bar (Cesaro and Sheamus)	Pinfall

Final; SmackDown; August 7, 2018
The New Day (Big E and Kofi Kingston)	Pinfall
The Bar	21:32
