= Extreme Rules (2018) =

WWE pay-per-view and livestreaming event

- Promotional poster featuring Team Hell No (Daniel Bryan and Kane)
- Promotion: WWE
- Brand(s): Raw; SmackDown
- Date: July 15, 2018
- City: Pittsburgh, Pennsylvania
- Venue: PPG Paints Arena
- Attendance: 14,739

WWE event chronology
← Previous; United Kingdom Championship Tournament	Next → NXT TakeOver: Brooklyn 4

Extreme Rules chronology
← Previous; 2017	Next → 2019

The 2018 Extreme Rules was a professional wrestling pay-per-view (PPV) and livestreaming event produced by WWE, held for wrestlers from the promotion's main roster brands, Raw and SmackDown. It was the 10th annual Extreme Rules event and took place on July 15, 2018, at the PPG Paints Arena in Pittsburgh, Pennsylvania. The theme of the event was that it featured various hardcore-based matches.

The card consisted of 12 matches, including two on the Kickoff pre-show. Only three matches, including one pre-show match, were contested under a hardcore stipulation. In the main event, Dolph Ziggler retained Raw's Intercontinental Championship by defeating Seth Rollins by 5–4 in a 30-minute Iron Man match that went into sudden death overtime. This was the first time that an Intercontinental Championship match was the main event of a WWE pay-per-view since Backlash in April 2001. In the penultimate match, AJ Styles retained SmackDown's WWE Championship against Rusev. In other prominent matches, Alexa Bliss retained the Raw Women's Championship against Nia Jax in an Extreme Rules match, Bobby Lashley defeated Roman Reigns, and Shinsuke Nakamura defeated Jeff Hardy to win SmackDown's United States Championship.

The event was originally planned to be held exclusively for the Raw brand, like the previous year, and it was also originally planned to be held on September 16 at the AT&T Center in San Antonio, Texas, but after April's WrestleMania 34, brand-exclusive PPV and livestreaming events for the main roster under the second brand split were discontinued. As a result, Extreme Rules was moved up to replace Battleground that was originally planned for this date and location, with Extreme Rules's original date and location given to Hell in a Cell. This also made it the first Extreme Rules since 2011 to feature multiple brands during a brand split.

== Production ==
=== Background ===
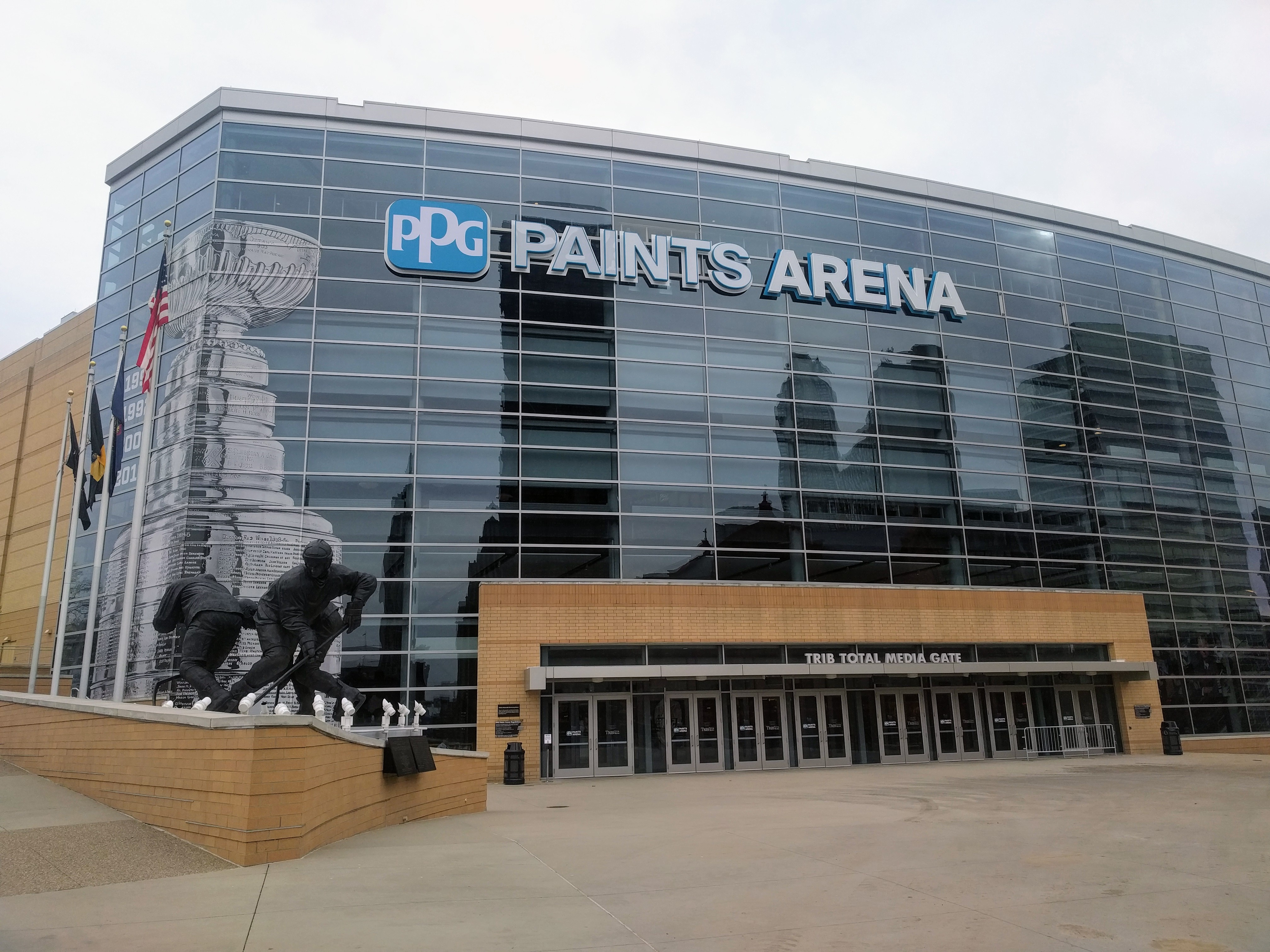
The 10th annual Extreme Rules event was held at the PPG Paints Arena in Pittsburgh, Pennsylvania.

Extreme Rules was an annual professional wrestling event produced by WWE since 2009. It was originally broadcast exclusively via pay-per-view (PPV) before it began simultaneously livestreaming on the WWE Network in 2014. The concept of the event was that it featured various matches that were contested under hardcore rules and generally featured one Extreme Rules match. The defunct Extreme Championship Wrestling promotion, which WWE acquired in 2003, originally used the "extreme rules" term to describe the regulations for all of its matches; WWE adopted the term, using it in place of "hardcore match" or "hardcore rules".

On November 22, 2017, the 10th Extreme Rules event was originally announced to be held on September 16, 2018, at the AT&T Center in San Antonio, Texas, and was to be held exclusively for wrestlers from Raw, like the 2017 event. However, following the discontinuation of brand-exclusive PPV and livestreaming events for the main roster after WrestleMania 34 in April, the event was subsequently moved up to July 15 with a new location of the PPG Paints Arena in Pittsburgh, Pennsylvania and featured wrestlers from both Raw and SmackDown. This made it the first Extreme Rules event since 2011 to feature multiple brands during a brand split, and the event's new date and location replaced an originally planned Battleground that was canceled as a result of the discontinuation of brand-exclusive PPV and livestreaming events for the main roster, with Extreme Rules's original date and location given to Hell in a Cell. Tickets went on sale on April 13 through Ticketmaster.

=== Storylines ===
The event comprised 12 matches, including two on the Kickoff pre-show, that resulted from scripted storylines. Results were predetermined by WWE's writers on the Raw and SmackDown brands, while storylines were produced on WWE's weekly television shows, Monday Night Raw and SmackDown Live.

==== Raw ====
On the June 18 episode of Raw, Dolph Ziggler defeated Seth Rollins to win his sixth Intercontinental Championship after Drew McIntyre, Ziggler's tag team partner, distracted Rollins. The following week, Rollins won a rematch for the title by disqualification after McIntyre interfered on Ziggler's behalf. On July 2, a 30-minute Iron Man match between the two was scheduled for Extreme Rules. On the July 9 episode, McIntyre defeated Rollins, ensuring that McIntyre would be in Ziggler's corner during the match.

At Money in the Bank, Alexa Bliss won the women's Money in the Bank ladder match. Later in the night, she interrupted the Raw Women's Championship match between Ronda Rousey and champion Nia Jax, causing a disqualification, and cashed in her Money in the Bank contract to win the championship. The following night on Raw, Jax invoked her championship rematch clause for Extreme Rules. Rousey was also suspended for 30 days as she attacked Raw General Manager Kurt Angle, who was trying to break up the fight between Rousey and Bliss. On the July 2 episode of Raw, the match at Extreme Rules was made an Extreme Rules match, and Rousey stated her intentions to be in the front row for the match.

On the June 4 episode of Raw, The B-Team (Bo Dallas and Curtis Axel) won a tag team battle royal to earn the right to face "Woken" Matt Hardy and Bray Wyatt for the Raw Tag Team Championship. On the June 25 episode of Raw, Axel defeated Hardy and the tag team title match was scheduled for Extreme Rules.

On the June 18 episode of Raw, Raw General Manager Kurt Angle scheduled a multi-man match for Extreme Rules, with the winner facing Brock Lesnar for the Universal Championship. Roman Reigns, claiming to be the "uncrowned champion" due to the controversial finish of his championship match at Greatest Royal Rumble, and Bobby Lashley, claiming to be the only person who could legitimately match Lesnar, were the first two participants confirmed for the match. The following week, however, the match was canceled over contract disputes with Lesnar. Reigns and Lashley wanted to face each other, but Angle instead had them team up against The Revival (Scott Dawson and Dash Wilder). The Revival won and in a rematch the following week, Reigns refused to tag in Lashley and Lashley abandoned Reigns to a post-match beat down by The Revival. A match between Lashley and Reigns was subsequently scheduled for Extreme Rules.

At Money in the Bank, Braun Strowman won the men's Money in the Bank ladder match. During the match, Strowman threw fellow competitor Kevin Owens off a ladder through two tables. The next night on Raw, Owens attempted to befriend Strowman by saying he would protect him now that he had the contract. Strowman attempted a powerslam on Owens but Owens escaped. Over the next few weeks, Strowman continuously embarrassed Owens including flipping his car over in the parking lot, and locking him inside a portable toilet. On the July 9 episode, a Steel Cage match between the two was scheduled for Extreme Rules.

==== SmackDown ====
On the June 19 episode of SmackDown, Rusev won a gauntlet match to become the number one contender for AJ Styles' WWE Championship at Extreme Rules.

Prior to the gauntlet match, Daniel Bryan had a stare down with SmackDown Tag Team Champions The Bludgeon Brothers (Harper and Rowan). During the gauntlet match, The Bludgeon Brothers attacked Bryan, thus ensuring Bryan's elimination. On the June 26 episode of SmackDown, Kane returned to save Bryan from a post-match assault from The Bludgeon Brothers, reuniting Team Hell No. SmackDown General Manager Paige then scheduled Team Hell No to face The Bludgeon Brothers for the tag titles at Extreme Rules.

At Money in the Bank, Carmella defeated Asuka to retain the SmackDown Women's Championship with the help of the returning James Ellsworth. On the following episode of SmackDown, Carmella attacked Asuka after a distraction by Ellsworth. On the June 26 episode of SmackDown, General Manager Paige scheduled a rematch for the title at Extreme Rules. On the July 10 episode, after Asuka defeated Ellsworth in a lumberjack match, Carmella laid out Asuka with a superkick. Later, it was announced that Ellsworth would be suspended above the ring in a shark cage during the championship match.

On the July 3 episode of SmackDown, The New Day's (Kofi Kingston, Big E, and Xavier Woods) were having a pancake-eating competition when they were interrupted by Sanity (Eric Young, Alexander Wolfe, and Killian Dain), who laid out The New Day, including putting Woods through a table. A tables match between the two teams was then scheduled for the Extreme Rules Kickoff pre-show.

== Event ==
Other on-screen personnel
Role:	Name:
English commentators	Michael Cole (Raw)
English commentators	Corey Graves (Raw/Smackdown
English commentators	Jonathan Coachman (Raw)
English commentators	Tom Phillips (SmackDown)
English commentators	Byron Saxton (SmackDown)
Spanish commentators	Carlos Cabrera
Spanish commentators	Marcelo Rodríguez
German commentators	Carsten Schaefer
German commentators	Tim Haber
German commentators	Calvin Knie
Ring announcers	Greg Hamilton (SmackDown)
Ring announcers	JoJo (Raw)
Referees	Danilo Anfibio
Referees	Shawn Bennett
Referees	Mike Chioda
Referees	John Cone
Referees	Dan Engler
Referees	Darrick Moore
Referees	Ryan Tran
Interviewers	Renee Young
Interviewers	Charly Caruso
Pre-show panel	Renee Young
Pre-show panel	Booker T
Pre-show panel	Sam Roberts
Pre-show panel	David Otunga
Post-show panel	Renee Young
Post-show panel	Sam Roberts

=== Pre-show ===
Two matches occurred during the Extreme Rules Kickoff pre-show. In the first, Andrade "Cien" Almas, accompanied by Zelina Vega, faced Sin Cara. The ending saw Vega distract Cara, allowing Almas to perform a running double knee smash on Cara, who was seated in the corner. Almas performed a hammerlock DDT on Cara to win the match.

Next, The New Day (Big E, Kofi Kingston, and Xavier Woods) faced Sanity (Eric Young, Alexander Wolfe, and Killian Dain) in a tables match. In the end, Wolfe restrained Kingston to allow Young to execute a diving elbow drop on Kingston through a table to win the match.

=== Preliminary matches ===
The actual pay-per-view opened with Matt Hardy and Bray Wyatt defending the Raw Tag Team Championship against The B-Team (Bo Dallas and Curtis Axel). In the climax, Dallas performed an elevated whiplash on Hardy to win the titles.

Next, Finn Bálor faced "Constable" Baron Corbin. In the end, Balor pinned Corbin with a small package to win the match.

After that, Carmella defended the SmackDown Women's Championship against Asuka, with James Ellsworth suspended above the ring in a shark cage. As Ellsworth unlocked the cage door by picking the lock, Ellsworth's foot was caught in the cage. Asuka then attacked Ellsworth. Production staff attempted to liberate Ellsworth from the cage only for Asuka to attack them, and continue to attack Ellsworth. Whilst the referee was distracted by Ellsworth, Carmella shoved Asuka into the cage and pinned her to retain the title. After the match, Asuka applied the "Asuka Lock" on Ellsworth.

Later, Jeff Hardy defended SmackDown's United States Championship against Shinsuke Nakamura. Before the match, Nakamura attacked Hardy with a low blow. Once Hardy was ruled able to compete, Nakamura performed a "Kinshasa" on Hardy to win the title in six seconds. After the match, Randy Orton appeared, making his return, and stared down with Nakamura, who was standing on top of the announce table. Orton attacked Hardy with a low blow before leaving, thus turning heel for the first time since November 2016.

In the fifth match, Braun Strowman faced Kevin Owens in a steel cage match. Owens used handcuffs to bound Strowman to the ring rope and attacked Strowman. As Owens attempted to escape, Strowman broke the handcuffs and performed a chokeslam on Owens off the top of the cage through an announce table. As Owens touched the floor first, he was ruled the winner. After the match, medical personnel carted Owens out on a stretcher.

Next, The Bludgeon Brothers (Harper and Rowan) defended the SmackDown Tag Team Championship against Team Hell No (Daniel Bryan and Kane). Due to an attack by Harper and Rowan earlier in the event that injured Kane's ankle, Bryan initially competed alone. Midway through the match, Kane appeared to participate and performed chokeslams on Harper and Rowan. In the end, Rowan and Harper performed a powerbomb/diving clothesline combination on Bryan to retain the titles.

After that, Roman Reigns faced Bobby Lashley. Lashley performed a spinebuster and a delayed vertical suplex on Reigns for a near-fall. Reigns performed a superman punch on Lashley for a near-fall. Lashley performed an overhead belly to belly suplex on Reigns over an announce table. Reigns performed a superman punch on Lashley, who was poised on the top rope. In the end, as Reigns went for a spear on Lashley, Lashley performed his own spear on Reigns to win the match.

Later, Alexa Bliss (accompanied by Mickie James) defended the Raw Women's Championship against Nia Jax (accompanied by Natalya) in an Extreme Rules match. During the match, Natalya attacked James only for Bliss and James to throw Natalya into the barricade. Ronda Rousey, who had been in attendance in the front row, jumped the barricade, attacked James and performed a twisting Samoan drop on James. Rousey threw James over an announce table and chased Bliss, only for James to strike Rousey with a kendo stick. As Jax attempted a Samoan drop on Bliss, James and Bliss struck Jax with chairs. In the climax, Bliss performed a "Bliss DDT" on Jax on the chair to retain the title.

In the penultimate match, AJ Styles defended SmackDown's WWE Championship against Rusev, accompanied by Aiden English. Styles applied the "Calf Crusher", but English pushed the ring rope, which Rusev grabbed to void the hold. Styles chased English, allowing Rusev to perform an overhead belly to belly suplex on the floor on Styles. Rusev performed a "Machka Kick" on Styles for a near-fall. Rusev applied "The Accolade", only for Styles to touch the ring rope to void the submission. After Rusev collided with an exposed turnbuckle, Styles performed a springboard 450° splash on Rusev for a near-fall. In the climax, Styles performed a baseball slide on English and a "Phenomenal Forearm" on Rusev to retain the title.

=== Main event ===
In the main event, Dolph Ziggler (accompanied by Drew McIntyre) defended Raw's Intercontinental Championship against Seth Rollins in a 30-minute Iron Man match. Rollins performed a turnbuckle powerbomb on Ziggler and pinned Ziggler with a la magistral to make the score 0–1. Rollins performed "The Stomp" on Ziggler to make the score 0–2. McIntyre attacked Rollins, thus Rollins won a fall by disqualification to make the score 0–3. The referee ejected McIntyre, who performed a "Claymore Kick" on Rollins before leaving. Ziggler pinned Rollins to make the score 1–3. Ziggler executed a superkick on Rollins to make the score 2–3. Ziggler threw Rollins into the ring post and performed a "Zig-Zag" on Rollins to tie the score 3–3. Ziggler pinned Rollins while using the ropes for leverage to make the score 4–3. Rollins executed a catapult into the corner on Ziggler and pinned him with a roll-up to tie the score 4–4. Rollins tried to make Ziggler submit to the Sharpshooter and the Crossface, but Ziggler escaped. After Ziggler was brought back in the ring, he performed a "Fameasser" on Rollins for a near-fall. In the closing moments, Ziggler attempted a superkick, but Rollins countered and performed a superkick and "The Stomp" on Ziggler, however, the time limit expired, thus the match ended in a draw at 4–4 and Ziggler seemingly retained the title. However, Raw General Manager Kurt Angle ordered the match to restart under sudden death overtime. As the match restarted, McIntyre appeared and distracted Rollins, allowing Ziggler to perform a "Zig Zag" on Rollins to win the match 5–4 and retain the title.

== Aftermath ==
=== Raw ===
At Extreme Rules, General Manager Kurt Angle offered Brock Lesnar an ultimatum: show up on Raw the next night or agree to the terms of his next title defense, otherwise he would be stripped of the Universal Championship. On Raw, Brock Lesnar was absent and as Angle was about to strip him of the title, he was interrupted by Lesnar's advocate Paul Heyman, who, on Lesnar's behalf, agreed that Lesnar would defend the championship at SummerSlam. Bobby Lashley and Roman Reigns won their respective triple threat matches to face each other the following week to determine Lesnar's challenger at SummerSlam, where Reigns won.

Also on Raw, Rousey, who just had two days left on her 30-day suspension, appeared and attacked Raw Women's Champion Alexa Bliss and Mickie James. After they were separated, Kurt Angle extended Rousey's suspension by one week and stated that as long as she does not violate her suspension, she would receive a Raw Women's Championship match against Bliss at SummerSlam.

On the July 23 episode of Raw, a rematch between Dolph Ziggler and Seth Rollins for the Intercontinental Championship was scheduled for SummerSlam, with Drew McIntyre in Ziggler's corner. On the August 13 episode, a returning Dean Ambrose confirmed that he would be in Rollins' corner during the match.

Baron Corbin and Finn Bálor had another match on the July 30 episode of Raw, where Corbin won. Another match between the two was later scheduled for SummerSlam.

On the July 23 episode of Raw, Kevin Owens vowed to take everything away from Braun Strowman, and a rematch between the two was scheduled for SummerSlam with a stipulation that if Owens won, even by disqualification or countout, he would win Strowman's Money in the Bank contract.

=== SmackDown ===
Jeff Hardy and Shinsuke Nakamura had a rematch for the United States Championship on the following episode of SmackDown, where Hardy won via disqualification after interference from Randy Orton. A rematch between Hardy and Nakamura for the title was later scheduled for SummerSlam.

Team Hell No were assaulted by The Bludgeon Brothers backstage before their match, and (kayfabe) injured Kane's ankle. WWE later acknowledged the injury as a broken ankle, however, the real injury to Kane's foot was he suffered tendinitis in his left heel. Thus once again caused Team Hell No to disband which resulted in Daniel Bryan then continuing his feud with The Miz on SmackDown, which led to a match between the two being made official for SummerSlam.

== Results ==
No.	Results	Stipulations	Times
1^{P}	Andrade "Cien" Almas (with Zelina Vega) defeated Sin Cara by pinfall	Singles match	7:00
2^{P}	Sanity (Eric Young, Alexander Wolfe, and Killian Dain) defeated The New Day (Big E, Kofi Kingston, and Xavier Woods)	Tables match	8:00
3	The B-Team (Bo Dallas and Curtis Axel) defeated Bray Wyatt and Matt Hardy (c) by pinfall	Tag team match for the WWE Raw Tag Team Championship	8:00
4	Finn Bálor defeated Baron Corbin by pinfall	Singles match	8:20
5	Carmella (c) defeated Asuka by pinfall	Singles match for the WWE SmackDown Women's Championship; James Ellsworth was suspended above the ring in a shark cage.	5:25
6	Shinsuke Nakamura defeated Jeff Hardy (c) by pinfall	Singles match for the WWE United States Championship	0:06
7	Kevin Owens defeated Braun Strowman by escaping the cage	Steel Cage match	8:05
8	The Bludgeon Brothers (Harper and Rowan) (c) defeated Team Hell No (Daniel Bryan and Kane) by pinfall	Tag team match for the WWE SmackDown Tag Team Championship	8:20
9	Bobby Lashley defeated Roman Reigns by pinfall	Singles match	14:50
10	Alexa Bliss (c) (with Mickie James) defeated Nia Jax (with Natalya) by pinfall	Extreme Rules match for the WWE Raw Women's Championship	7:30
11	AJ Styles (c) defeated Rusev (with Aiden English) by pinfall	Singles match for the WWE Championship	15:35
12	Dolph Ziggler (c) (with Drew McIntyre) defeated Seth Rollins by 5–4 in sudden death overtime	30-minute Iron Man match for the WWE Intercontinental Championship	30:10
(c) / – the champion(s) heading into the match; P / – the match was broadcast on the pre-show

=== Iron Man match ===
Score		Point winner	Decision	Notes	Time
Ziggler	Rollins	Point winner	Decision	Notes	Time
0	1	Seth Rollins	Pinfall	Rollins pinned Ziggler with a magistral cradle	4:35
0	2	Seth Rollins	Pinfall	Rollins pinned Ziggler after The Stomp	8:00
0	3	Seth Rollins	Disqualification	Ziggler was disqualified after Drew McIntyre attacked Rollins	9:00
1	3	Dolph Ziggler	Pinfall	Ziggler pinned Rollins after a Claymore Kick by McIntyre	10:25
2	3	Dolph Ziggler	Pinfall	Ziggler pinned Rollins after a superkick	12:10
3	3	Dolph Ziggler	Pinfall	Ziggler pinned Rollins after the Zig Zag	13:20
4	3	Dolph Ziggler	Pinfall	Ziggler pinned Rollins with a schoolboy while using the ropes for leverage	14:07
4	4	Seth Rollins	Pinfall	Rollins pinned Ziggler with a sunset flip	26:55
5	4	Dolph Ziggler	Pinfall	Ziggler pinned Rollins after the Zig Zag while Rollins was distracted by McIntyre	30:10
