= Extreme Rules (2017) =

WWE pay-per-view and livestreaming event

- Promotional poster featuring The Hardy Boyz (Jeff Hardy and Matt Hardy)
- Promotion: WWE
- Brand: Raw
- Date: June 4, 2017
- City: Baltimore, Maryland
- Venue: Royal Farms Arena
- Attendance: 11,769

WWE event chronology
| ← Previous; Backlash | Next → Money in the Bank |

Extreme Rules chronology
| ← Previous; 2016 | Next → 2018 |

The 2017 Extreme Rules was a professional wrestling pay-per-view (PPV) and livestreaming event produced by WWE, held exclusively for wrestlers from the promotion's main roster brand, Raw. It was the ninth annual Extreme Rules event and took place on June 4, 2017, at the Royal Farms Arena in Baltimore, Maryland. This was the second Extreme Rules held at this venue, after the 2010 event when it was known as 1st Mariner Arena. The theme of the event was that it featured various hardcore-based matches.

Seven matches were contested at the event, including one on the Kickoff pre-show. Only three of the main card's matches were contested under a hardcore stipulation. In the main event, Samoa Joe defeated Roman Reigns, Seth Rollins, Finn Bálor, and Bray Wyatt in an Extreme Rules fatal five-way match to earn a Universal Championship match at Great Balls of Fire. In other prominent matches, Cesaro and Sheamus defeated The Hardy Boyz (Jeff Hardy and Matt Hardy) in a Steel Cage match to win their second Raw Tag Team Championship as a team, and in the opening bout, The Miz defeated Dean Ambrose to win his seventh Intercontinental Championship.

This was the first Extreme Rules event held since the reintroduction of the brand extension in July 2016. This was also the only to be brand-exclusive for either brand split period. The first three events in 2009, 2010, and 2011 had featured wrestlers from both Raw and SmackDown as brand-exclusive PPV events during the first brand split were discontinued in April 2007, and then the first brand split ended in August 2011. The 2018 event was again planned to be Raw-exclusive, but brand-exclusive PPV and livestreaming events for the main roster under the second brand split were discontinued following WrestleMania 34 in April that year.

== Production ==
=== Background ===
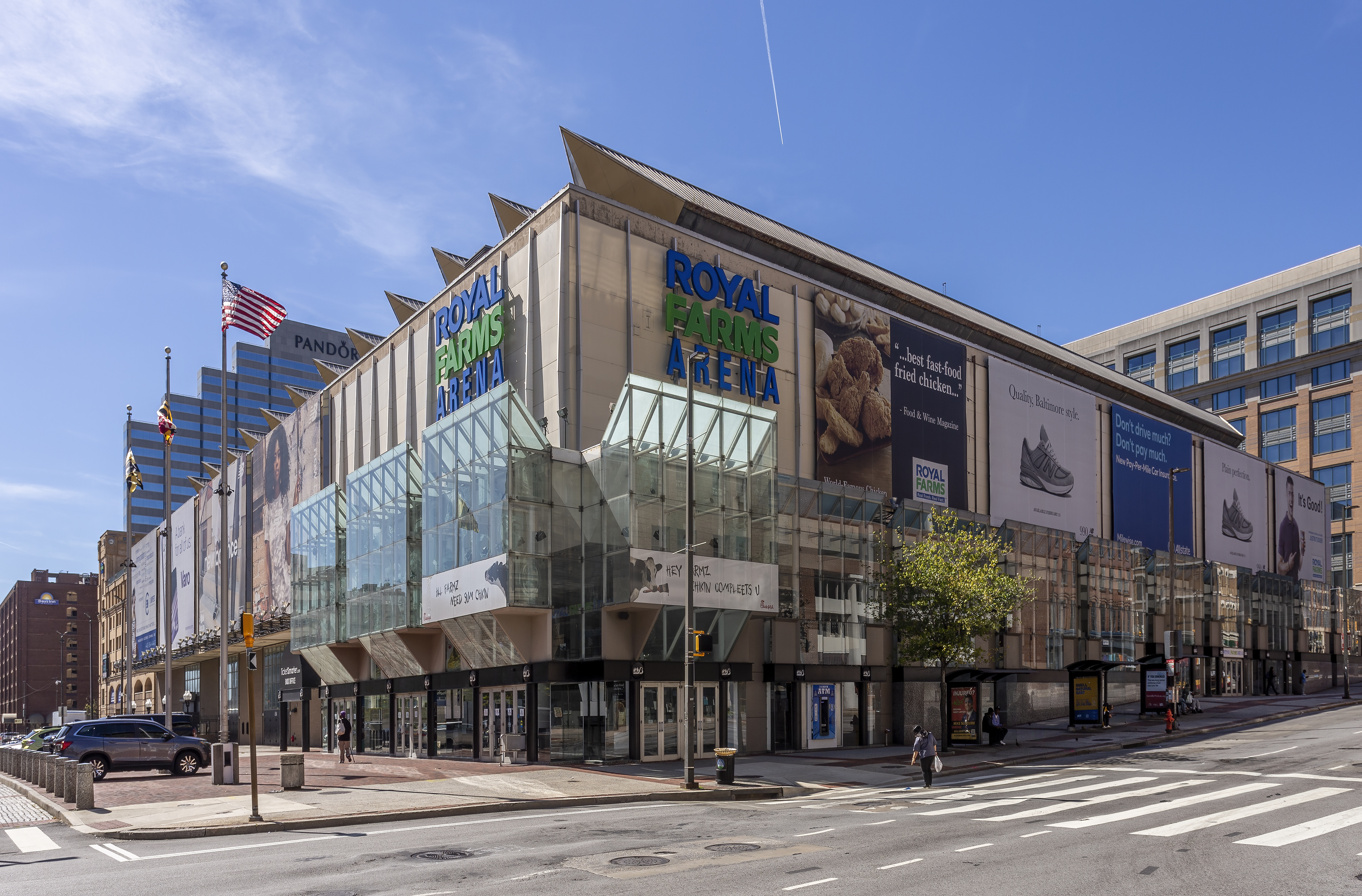
The ninth annual Extreme Rules was the second time for the event to be held at the Royal Farms Arena in Baltimore, Maryland, after 2010 when it was known as 1st Mariner Arena (renamed in 2014).

Extreme Rules was an annual professional wrestling event produced by WWE since 2009. It was originally broadcast exclusively via pay-per-view (PPV) before it began simultaneously livestreaming on the WWE Network in 2014. The concept of the event was that it featured various matches that were contested under hardcore rules and generally featured one Extreme Rules match. The defunct Extreme Championship Wrestling promotion, which WWE acquired in 2003, originally used the "extreme rules" term to describe the regulations for all of its matches; WWE adopted the term, using it in place of "hardcore match" or "hardcore rules".

Announced on February 27, 2017, the ninth Extreme Rules event was scheduled to take place on June 4, 2017, at the Royal Farms Arena in Baltimore, Maryland. This was the second Extreme Rules held at this venue, after the 2010 event when it was known as 1st Mariner Arena (renamed in 2014). Tickets went on sale on March 4 through Ticketmaster. Following the reintroduction of the brand extension in July, where WWE again split its main roster into two brands, Raw and SmackDown, where wrestlers were exclusively assigned to perform, brand-exclusive PPV events were also reinstated, which had been discontinued during the first brand split after WrestleMania 23 in April 2007. As a result, the 2017 Extreme Rules event was held exclusively for Raw, which made it the first brand-exclusive Extreme Rules event, as the first three events in 2009, 2010, and 2011 featured wrestlers from both brands before the original brand extension ended in August 2011.

=== Storylines ===
The event comprised seven matches, including one on the Kickoff pre-show, that resulted from scripted storylines. Results were predetermined by WWE's writers on the Raw brand, while storylines were produced on WWE's weekly television shows, Monday Night Raw and the cruiserweight-exclusive 205 Live.

At Payback, Seth Rollins defeated Samoa Joe, giving Joe his first loss since debuting on the main roster. The following night on Raw, Rollins stated that his business with Joe was done. He then turned his attention to Universal Champion Brock Lesnar, however, Finn Bálor came out and stated that he should be the next person to face Lesnar as Bálor was the inaugural champion and never lost the title. The two then participated in an Intercontinental Championship number one contender's triple threat match, also including The Miz, who won following interference from Samoa Joe, who attacked Rollins, and Bray Wyatt, who performed Sister Abigail on Bálor. Also at Payback, Braun Strowman defeated Roman Reigns in the main event. After the match, Strowman continued to attack Reigns, but Reigns retaliated by slamming an ambulance door on Strowman's arm multiple times. On the May 8 episode of Raw, Strowman indicated his desire to face Lesnar for the Universal Title after he was finished with Reigns. Later that night, Reigns attacked Strowman during his match against Kalisto, targeting his arm with a steel chair. It was then revealed that Strowman required surgery on his injured arm, and would be inactive for up to six months. Due to Strowman's situation and the need for a number one contender, General Manager Kurt Angle scheduled a #1 contender's Extreme Rules fatal five-way match for Extreme Rules between Reigns, Rollins, Joe, Bálor, and Wyatt.

On the May 1 episode of Raw, Dean Ambrose interrupted an argument between Seth Rollins and Finn Bálor over who should face Brock Lesnar for the Universal Championship. Ambrose criticized Lesnar for not appearing and wrestling often and claimed his Intercontinental Championship to be the top title of the Raw brand. The Miz then came out and said that he should be the one to face Ambrose for the title. A #1 contender's match for Ambrose's title was scheduled between Rollins, Bálor, and Miz, who won the match after Samoa Joe attacked Rollins and Bray Wyatt attacked Bálor with Sister Abigail. On the May 15 episode of Raw, Miz received his Intercontinental Championship match against Ambrose, which Miz won by disqualification after Ambrose low blowed Miz, who had attempted a low blow on Ambrose. Later, Ambrose was scheduled to defend his Intercontinental Championship against The Miz at Extreme Rules with the stipulation being that if Ambrose were disqualified, he would lose the title.

At Payback, The Hardy Boyz (Jeff Hardy and Matt Hardy) retained the Raw Tag Team Championship against Cesaro and Sheamus. After the match, Cesaro and Sheamus attacked The Hardys, turning heel. The next night on Raw, Cesaro and Sheamus explained their reasoning for attacking The Hardy Boyz by calling them a novelty act and criticized the fans for living in the past instead of appreciating the present and claimed that The Hardys stole their moment at WrestleMania 33. The Hardys then appeared and ran Cesaro and Sheamus out of the ring. The following week, Cesaro and Sheamus won a number one contender's tag team turmoil match against Enzo Amore and Big Cass, Heath Slater and Rhyno, Luke Gallows and Karl Anderson, and The Golden Truth (Goldust and R-Truth), for another title opportunity. After the final match of the tag team turmoil, Cesaro and Sheamus continued to attack The Golden Truth, but The Hardy Boyz came out for the save and Cesaro and Sheamus retreated. The following week, the tag team title match was scheduled for Extreme Rules and Jeff defeated Sheamus. On the May 22 episode of Raw, Matt faced Sheamus in a match where the winner chose the stipulation for their Extreme Rules tag team championship bout. Matt won and decided on a Steel Cage match.

At Payback, Alexa Bliss defeated Bayley to win her first Raw Women's Championship, as well as becoming the first woman to win both the Raw Women's Championship and SmackDown Women's Championship. The following night on Raw, Bliss had a coronation for both accomplishments. The other seven female wrestlers on the Raw roster were also in the ring. She insulted Mickie James, Sasha Banks, and Bayley before a brawl broke out that resulted in an eight-woman tag team match where the team of Bliss, Nia Jax, Emma, and Alicia Fox defeated the team of Bayley, Banks, James, and Dana Brooke. The following week, Bliss aligned with Jax and defeated James. After the match, Bliss continued to attack James. Bayley came out for the save and chased Bliss backstage. Jax then attacked James. On the May 15 episode of Raw, Bayley confronted Bliss and invoked her championship rematch for Extreme Rules. A brawl ensued and Bliss found a kendo stick under the ring and attacked Bayley with it. Later, their Raw Women's Championship match at Extreme Rules was made a Kendo Stick-on-a-Pole match.

At Payback, Austin Aries defeated WWE Cruiserweight Champion Neville by disqualification, but Neville kept the title. The following night on Raw, T. J. Perkins, now going by TJP, was defeated by Aries, but after the match, TJP attacked Aries and injured his leg. The following week, TJP defeated Gentleman Jack Gallagher. After the match, TJP continued to attack Gallagher, who was saved by Aries. The following night on 205 Live, Neville said that TJP was deserving of a title shot for his attack on Aries, but TJP did not defeat Aries. The next week on Raw, it was announced that Aries would have another title opportunity against Neville at Extreme Rules. Neville and TJP then defeated Aries and Gallagher in a tag team match. On the following 205 Live, Aries defeated TJP by submission. It was then revealed that Aries and Neville's WWE Cruiserweight Championship bout at Extreme Rules would be a submission match. On the May 29 episode of Raw, Aries and Gallagher defeated Neville and TJP in a tag team rematch when Aries made Neville submit, the first time Neville ever submitted. The following night on 205 Live, Aries stated that he would make Neville submit again at Extreme Rules. He was then attacked from behind by TJP and Neville applied the Rings of Saturn on Aries while TJP continued to attack Aries' leg and Aries passed out.

Also in the cruiserweight division, Noam Dar had been dating Alicia Fox. Fox then began receiving gifts from an anonymous sender on 205 Live. Rich Swann revealed that he was the one sending the gifts, but Dar tried to claim credit, including the final gift, which ended up exploding powder in Fox's face. Fox then split from Dar, which was Swann's intention as Fox had previously dated Swann's friend Cedric Alexander and split from him. However, Dar and Fox reunited after Dar defeated Swann on the May 2 episode of 205 Live. On the May 8 episode of Raw, Sasha Banks began a feud with Fox, where the two traded wins over the next couple of weeks. After Banks defeated Fox on the May 22 episode of Raw, Dar confronted Banks, who attacked him, but Fox attacked Banks with a scissors kick. A mixed tag team match featuring Swann and Banks against Dar and Fox was scheduled for Extreme Rules. Banks then appeared for the first time on 205 Live on May 30, where she accompanied Swann for his match against Dar, which Dar won.

After being moved to Raw during the Superstar Shake-up, Apollo Crews caught the attention of Titus O'Neil, who offered to become his manager as part of "The Titus Brand". Crews accepted and started displaying attitude and cockiness, which caused his friend Kalisto, who also moved to Raw during the shake-up, to confront him. The two had a match, where Kalisto defeated Crews. On June 4, a rematch between the two was scheduled for the Extreme Rules Kickoff pre-show.

== Event ==
Other on-screen personnel
| Role: | Name: |
|---|---|
| English commentators | Michael Cole |
| English commentators | Corey Graves |
| English commentators | Booker T |
| Spanish commentators | Carlos Cabrera |
| Spanish commentators | Marcelo Rodríguez |
| German commentators | Carsten Schaefer |
| German commentators | Tim Haber |
| German commentators | Calvin Knie |
| Ring announcer | JoJo |
| Referees | Shawn Bennett |
| Referees | John Cone |
| Referees | Dan Engler |
| Referees | Darrick Moore |
| Referees | Rod Zapata |
| Backstage interviewer | Charly Caruso |
| Pre-show panel | Renee Young |
| Pre-show panel | Sam Roberts |
| Pre-show panel | David Otunga |
| Raw Talk panel | Renee Young |
| Raw Talk panel | Corey Graves |

=== Pre-show ===
During the Extreme Rules Kickoff pre-show, Kalisto faced Apollo Crews, who was accompanied by Titus O'Neil. In the climax, as Crews argued with O'Neil, Kalisto performed "Salida Del Sol" on Crews to win the match.

=== Preliminary matches ===
The actual pay-per-view opened with Dean Ambrose defending the Intercontinental Championship against The Miz, with the stipulation that if Ambrose was disqualified, he would lose the title. During the match, Maryse slapped Miz in front of the referee in an attempt to get Ambrose disqualified, however, the referee knew Maryse's actions and opted not to disqualify Ambrose and in the process, Maryse was evicted from ringside. In the end, Miz shoved Ambrose into the referee, who considered disqualifying Ambrose. Whilst Ambrose was distracted, Miz performed a "Skull Crushing Finale" on Ambrose to win the title for the seventh time.

Next, Rich Swann and Sasha Banks faced Noam Dar and Alicia Fox in a mixed tag team match. The match ended when Swann performed a "Phoenix Splash" on Dar for the win.

After that, Alexa Bliss defended the Raw Women's Championship against Bayley in a Kendo Stick-on-a-Pole match. Bayley was able to grab the kendo stick, but Bliss ducked the shot and knocked Bayley down. Bliss then struck Bayley with the kendo stick multiple times. Bayley was able to perform a Bayley-to-Belly suplex on Bliss, but couldn't capitalize. Bliss took advantage with more kendo stick shots and performed a Snap DDT on Bayley to retain the title.

In the next match, The Hardy Boyz defended the Raw Tag Team Championship against Cesaro and Sheamus in a Steel Cage match, which could only be won if both members of a team escaped the cage. In the end, Jeff performed "Whisper in the Wind" off the cage on both Cesaro and Sheamus. As Matt attempted to pull Jeff through the cage door, Cesaro and Sheamus climbed and narrowly escaped the cage before The Hardys to regain the titles for a second time. This was also The Hardy Boyz first loss since their return at WrestleMania 33.

In the penultimate match, Neville defended the WWE Cruiserweight Championship against Austin Aries. In the end, Neville performed a "Red Arrow" to Aries' back and forced Aries to submit to the "Rings of Saturn" to retain the title.

=== Main event ===
In the main event, Roman Reigns, Seth Rollins, Bray Wyatt, Finn Bálor, and Samoa Joe competed in an Extreme Rules match to determine the number one contender against Brock Lesnar for the Universal Championship at Great Balls of Fire. After Wyatt and Joe attacked Reigns and Rollins with the steel steps, Wyatt performed a DDT on Rollins onto the steel steps. Joe applied the "Coquina Clutch" on Bálor, who escaped. Wyatt performed a side slam on Reigns onto an announce table. Joe applied the "Coquina Clutch" on Wyatt, but Bálor struck Joe with a chair. Reigns performed a spear through the barricade on Bálor and Joe. Rollins performed a frog splash on Wyatt through an announce table. Bálor performed a "Coup de Grâce" on Reigns, but as Bálor attempted a pin, Joe applied the "Coquina Clutch" on Bálor, who passed out, giving Joe the win by technical submission and becoming the number one contender for the Universal Championship.

== Aftermath ==
The following night on Raw, Samoa Joe confronted Brock Lesnar's advocate Paul Heyman. Joe said that unlike many others, he did not fear Lesnar and wanted to face him. Joe then applied the Coquina Clutch on Heyman to send a message to Lesnar, who returned the following week and brawled with Joe.

Also on the post-Extreme Rules Raw, the other four participants of the fatal five-way were scheduled to face each other in singles matches. Roman Reigns defeated Bray Wyatt and Seth Rollins was scheduled to face Finn Bálor, but General Manager Kurt Angle instead booked Rollins to face Joe due to Joe's attack on Heyman. In the climax, Wyatt's music played and distracted Rollins, giving Joe the win, and beginning a feud between Rollins and Wyatt.

Dean Ambrose attacked Elias Samson during his segment and demanded a rematch against The Miz, who appeared on the TitanTron and said that Ambrose would not be getting a rematch as Miz was having a celebration. Samson then attacked Ambrose. Later, The Miz had his celebration on becoming a seven-time Intercontinental Champion, which was crashed by Ambrose, who attacked Miz with Dirty Deeds.

After defeating Heath Slater and Rhyno, new Raw Tag Team Champions Cesaro and Sheamus taunted The Hardy Boyz for picking a stipulation that they thought would give them the advantage. The Hardy Boyz then invoked their championship rematch for the following week in a two-out-of-three falls match. After tying the match 1-1, it ended in a double countout, thus Cesaro and Sheamus retained the titles.

TJP confronted WWE Cruiserweight Champion Neville about their agreement, and Neville said that TJP deserved a title shot. Later, after TJP defeated Mustafa Ali, Neville attacked TJP and said he would get his title shot the next night on 205 Live, where Neville retained. This would be Austin Aries' final PPV match with WWE as he was released on July 7.

After retaining her Raw Women's Championship, General Manager Kurt Angle scheduled Alexa Bliss to defend her title against Nia Jax that night on Raw, as she had promised Jax a title shot after she defeated Bayley. The match ended in a disqualification win for Bliss after she intentionally got Mickie James and Dana Brooke, who were at ringside, to attack her. The following week, Bayley said in a sit-down interview that she had never been in a match like that before, but she would eventually recapture the Raw Women's Championship.

Titus O'Neil, accompanied by Apollo Crews, decided to face Kalisto himself, but was defeated. The following night on 205 Live, Titus tried to recruit Akira Tozawa, as per recommendation from Crews, to "The Titus Brand".

The 2017 Extreme Rules would be the only to be brand-exclusive, as although the 2018 event was originally planned to again be held for Raw, WWE discontinued brand-exclusive PPV and livestreaming events for the main roster following WrestleMania 34 in April that year. The 2018 event was also originally planned for September in San Antonio, Texas, but with the discontinuation of brand-exclusive PPV and livestreaming events, it was moved up to July to replace an originally planned Battleground for that year.

== Results ==
| No. | Results | Stipulations | Times |
|---|---|---|---|
| 1^{P} | Kalisto defeated Apollo Crews (with Titus O'Neil) by pinfall | Singles match | 9:40 |
| 2 | The Miz (with Maryse) defeated Dean Ambrose (c) by pinfall | Singles match for the WWE Intercontinental Championship; If Ambrose had been disqualified, he would have lost the title. | 20:00 |
| 3 | Rich Swann and Sasha Banks defeated Alicia Fox and Noam Dar by pinfall | Mixed tag team match | 6:20 |
| 4 | Alexa Bliss (c) defeated Bayley by pinfall | Kendo stick-on-a-Pole match for the WWE Raw Women's Championship | 5:10 |
| 5 | Cesaro and Sheamus defeated The Hardy Boyz (Jeff Hardy and Matt Hardy) (c) by escaping the cage | Steel Cage match for the WWE Raw Tag Team Championship | 15:00 |
| 6 | Neville (c) defeated Austin Aries | Submission match for the WWE Cruiserweight Championship | 17:35 |
| 7 | Samoa Joe defeated Finn Bálor, Roman Reigns, Seth Rollins, and Bray Wyatt by technical submission | Fatal 5-Way Extreme Rules match for a WWE Universal Championship match at Great Balls of Fire | 29:15 |
(c) / – the champion(s) heading into the match; P / – the match was broadcast on the pre-show
