= Team Hell No =

Professional wrestling tag team

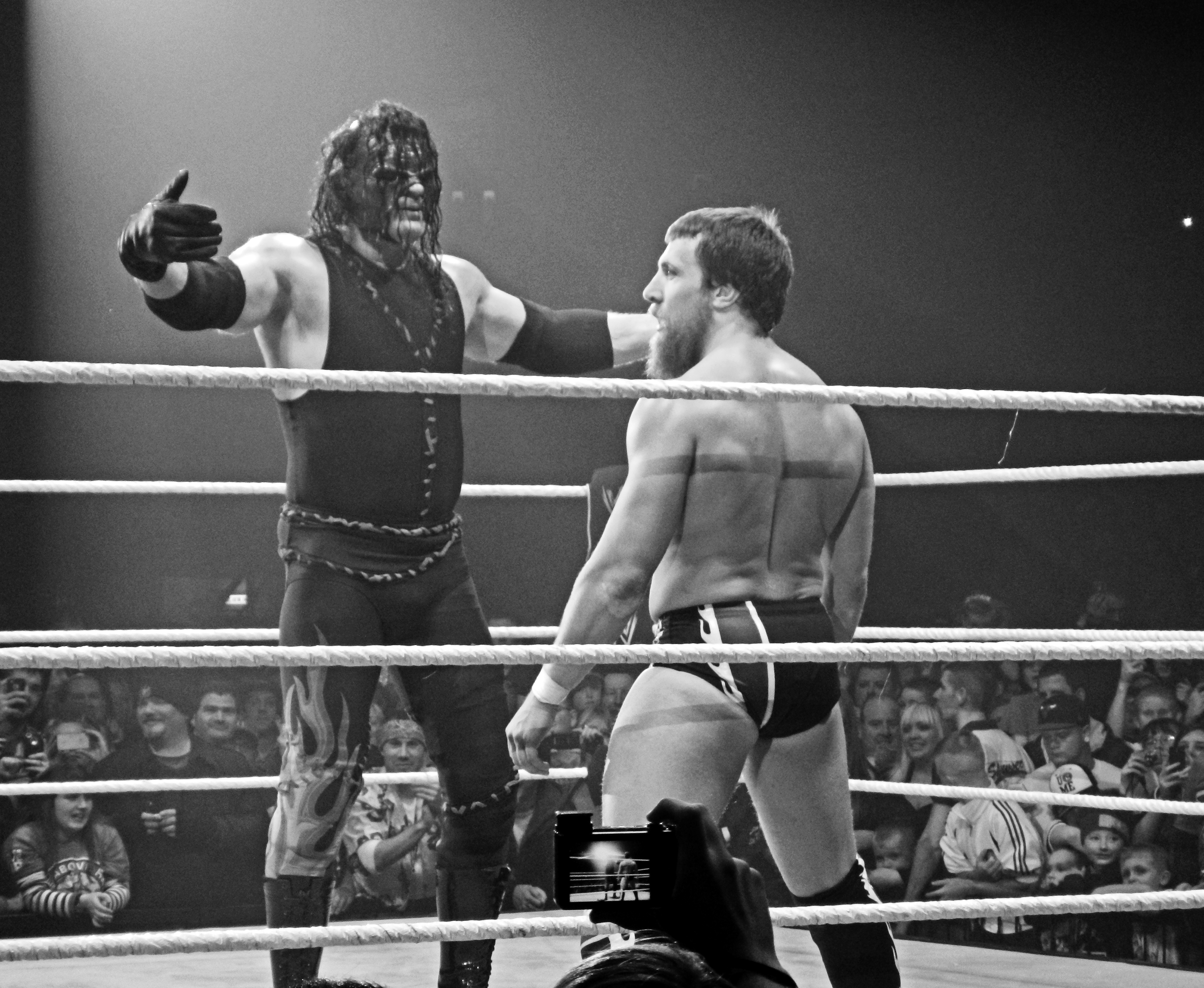
- Kane and Daniel Bryan in 2012

Tag team
- Members: Kane; Daniel Bryan
- Name(s): Team Hell No; Kane and Daniel Bryan
- Billed heights: Kane: 7 ft 0 in (2.13 m); Daniel Bryan: 5 ft 10 in (1.78 m)
- Combined billed weight: 533 lb (242 kg)
- Debut: September 10, 2012
- Disbanded: July 15, 2018
- Years active: 2012–2013; 2018

Team Hell No was a professional wrestling tag team in WWE consisting of Kane and Daniel Bryan. The team's name is a reference to the two wrestlers' personas: Kane is portrayed as a violent pyromaniac and described as "The Devil's Favorite Demon" while Bryan's character at the time of their original formation was that of a spiteful pessimist whose catchphrase was to loudly exclaim "No!" (a reversal of his "Yes!" catchphrase). Originally portrayed as bitter enemies, the two were forced to work as a team during an angle in which they were made to attend anger management classes by then Raw General Manager AJ Lee and—though billed as a dysfunctional team—they were subsequently able to win the WWE Tag Team Championship.

== History ==
=== Original run (2012–2013) ===
In May 2012, Kane became involved in the ongoing feud between Daniel Bryan and CM Punk, leading to a triple threat match at No Way Out in June, where Punk retained the WWE Championship. During this period, AJ, Bryan’s on-screen ex-girlfriend, was depicted as being romantically involved with both Punk and Kane. After briefly reconciling with Bryan, AJ rejected him during their wedding segment on the 1000th episode of Raw in July and instead accepted the role of Raw General Manager. She later scheduled a match between Bryan and Kane at SummerSlam in August, which Bryan won.

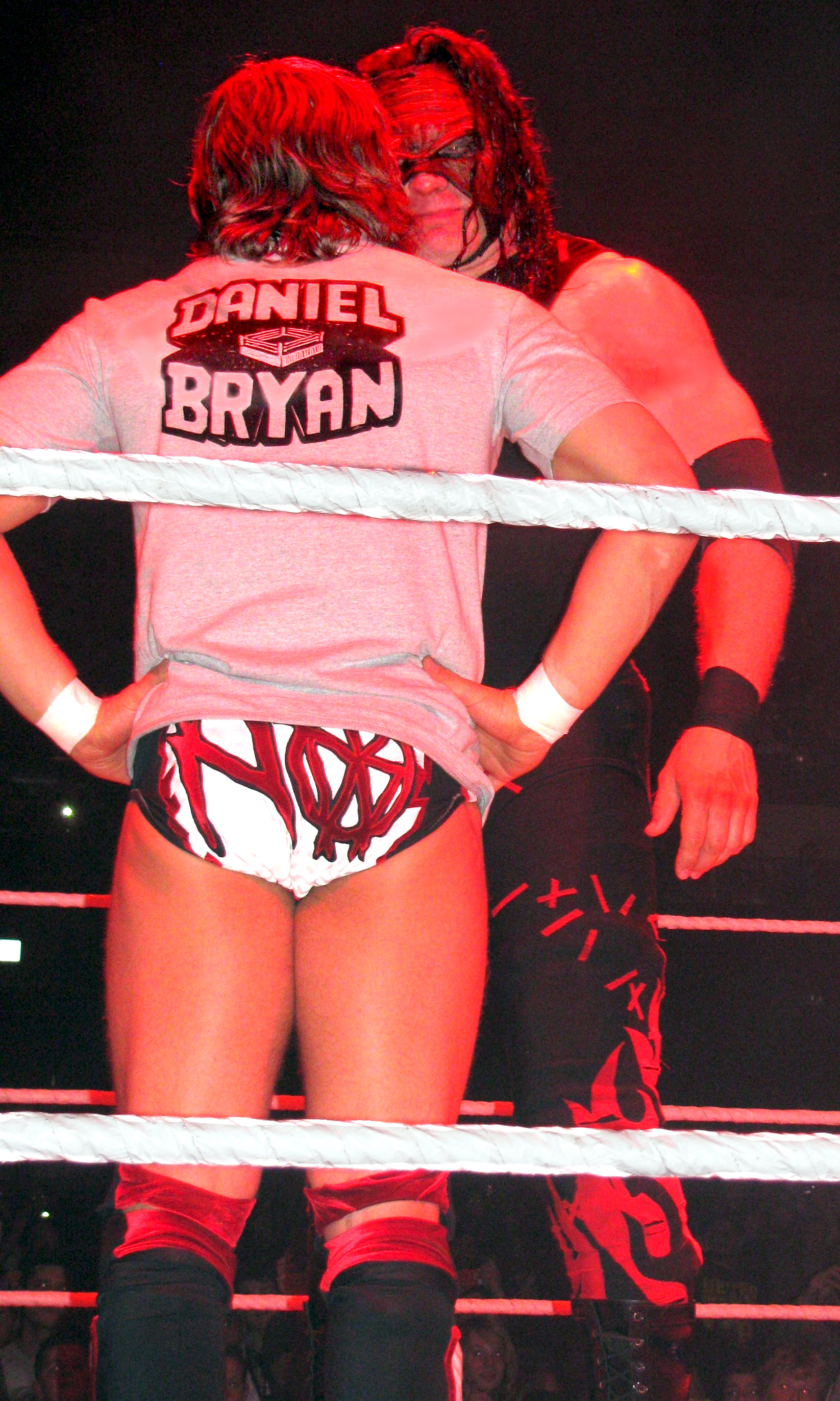
Team Hell No did not always see eye to eye, especially during their formative phase

Following their SummerSlam match, Kane became increasingly violent in his demands for a rematch while Bryan, upset with fans for continuing to chant his catchphrase of "Yes!" after he had told them not to, continued to lose his temper and have bursts of anger during matches and interview segments. As a result of Bryan and Kane's issues, AJ enrolled them in anger management classes hosted by Dr. Shelby and later forced them to compete in a "hug it out" match. At the arrangement of Dr. Shelby and AJ, the two adversaries formed a team whose constant bickering and infighting even during matches inadvertently resulted in them defeating the Prime Time Players (Titus O'Neil and Darren Young) to become the number one contenders to the WWE Tag Team Championship on the September 10 episode of Raw and then defeating defending champions Kofi Kingston and R-Truth to win the WWE Tag Team Championship at Night of Champions. Bryan and Kane made their first successful title defense the following night on Raw, defeating the former champions in a rematch. The following week on Raw, "Team Hell No" was chosen as the official team name via a Twitter poll and the Rhodes Scholars (Cody Rhodes and Damien Sandow) immediately began a feud with them. During this period, both Kane and Bryan made the transition from villains to fan favorites, aided by the audience's enjoyment of their bickering over which one was (by himself) the WWE Tag Team Champions.

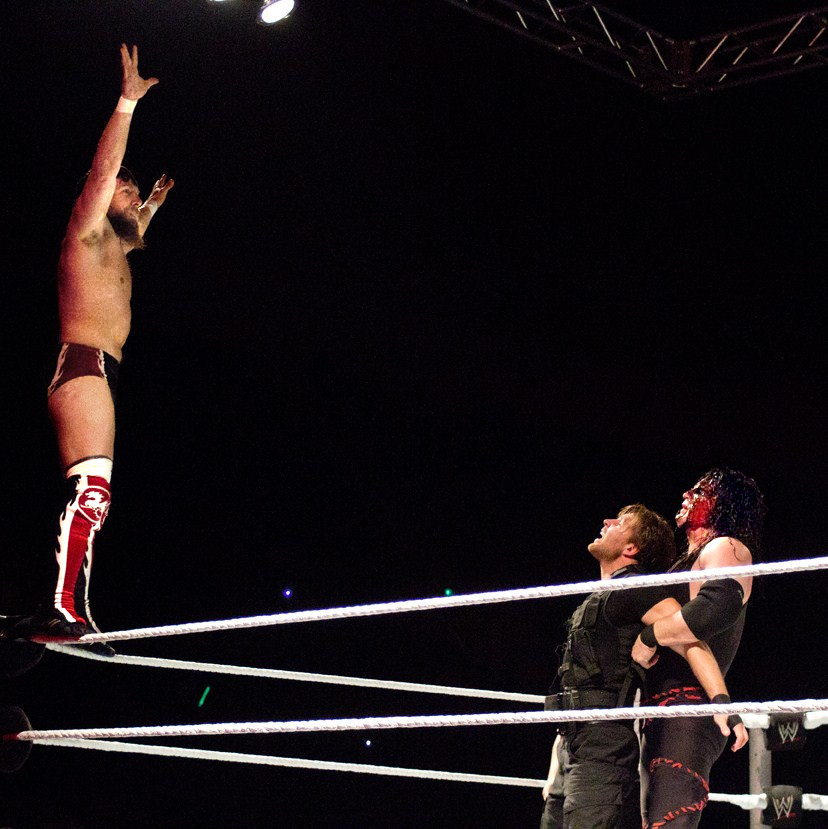
Kane and Bryan became a cohesive unit when they focused on battling the members of The Shield, such as Dean Ambrose

On October 28 at Hell in a Cell, Team Hell No lost to the Rhodes Scholars via disqualification, but retained their titles as a result. This was followed by a rematch on the November 14 episode of Main Event, where Team Hell No defeated the Rhodes Scholars to retain the WWE Tag Team Championship. On the November 26 episode of Raw, after Kane lost to WWE Champion CM Punk in a non-title match, he was assaulted by The Shield (Dean Ambrose, Seth Rollins and Roman Reigns); Bryan and Ryback, who both attempted to save Kane, suffered a similar fate. This attack had the effect of uniting Bryan and Kane, and after The Shield and Team Hell No, along with Ryback, attacked each other on the December 3 episode of Raw, all six men were decreed to face each other in a Tables, Ladders, and Chairs match at TLC: Tables, Ladders and Chairs, where The Shield was victorious after pinning Bryan. On the following episode of Main Event, Team Hell No defeated Team Rhodes Scholars to retain the WWE Tag Team Championship. On the December 31 episode of Raw, Team Hell No successfully defended their titles against 3MB (Drew McIntyre and Heath Slater). On January 27, 2013, at the Royal Rumble, Team Hell No once again retained the WWE Tag Team Championship against Team Rhodes Scholars. During the Royal Rumble Match, Bryan eliminated Kane and was in turn thrown out of the ring by Antonio Cesaro; Kane caught Bryan before he touched the floor and despite Bryan's begging, dropped him to complete Bryan's elimination. In February, both Bryan and Kane qualified for the number one contender Elimination Chamber match for the World Heavyweight Championship, but were both eliminated by Mark Henry at the Elimination Chamber pay-per-view.

Team Hell No then began a feud with Dolph Ziggler when he defeated both Bryan and Kane in singles competition due to interference from his enforcer Big E Langston. On April 7 at WrestleMania 29, Team Hell No defeated Ziggler and Langston for another successful title defense. The following night on Raw, Team Hell No rekindled their rivalry with The Shield after they saved The Undertaker from an attack. On the April 22 episode of Raw, Team Hell No and The Undertaker were defeated by The Shield in a six-man tag team match. The Shield went on to take out Undertaker and continuously rack up wins over Bryan and Kane in both singles and tag matches that also included WWE Champion John Cena. On May 19 at Extreme Rules, Bryan and Kane lost the WWE Tag Team Championship to Shield members Seth Rollins and Roman Reigns, ending their reign at 245 days.

As Bryan being pinned led to the loss of the tag titles, Bryan became obsessed with proving that he was not the weak link of Team Hell No. As a result, Bryan became even more aggressive, but his overzealous behavior led to Team Hell No losing their rematch against Reigns and Rollins on the May 27 episode of Raw. When Kane tried to reassure Bryan, Bryan replied with harsh rebukes that alienated Kane from him. As a result, Bryan was paired with Randy Orton despite their poor relationship to face a common enemy in the Shield, while Kane began to go on his own. On the June 14 episode of SmackDown, Bryan, Kane, and Orton teamed up to end the Shield's undefeated streak in televised six-man tag matches when Bryan forced Rollins to submit to the Yes! Lock. Bryan and Kane then went their separate ways on the June 17 episode of Raw, as both announced their intention to become WWE Champion.

=== Late feud (2013–2017) ===
On the July 29 episode of Raw, Bryan and Kane faced each other in a match, which was won by Bryan. After the match Kane attacked Bryan, but was interrupted and attacked by The Wyatt Family. Meanwhile, Bryan's determination to prove himself led to a winning streak, culminating in him winning the WWE Championship at SummerSlam. When Kane returned on October 28 of Raw, he became "Director of Operations". Kane chokeslamed Bryan at the February 3 edition of Raw. The following week, Bryan attacked Kane and on February 17 edition of Raw they faced each other one more time, with Bryan winning by disqualification. On the April 21 episode of Raw, after Bryan married Brie Bella, Stephanie McMahon announced that Bryan would face Kane at Extreme Rules for the WWE World Heavyweight Championship. Kane (now masked) ended up attacking Bryan afterwards, executing three Tombstone Piledrivers to Bryan on the concrete, steel steps, and on the announce table, resulting in Bryan being carried out on a stretcher. The following week, Bryan had suffered a neck and arm injury, and had surgery the next week. Kane and Bryan's feud ended with Bryan winning his title match against Kane at Extreme Rules in an Extreme Rules match in the main event. Bryan and Kane were booked to face each other in a rematch at Money in the Bank in a stretcher match, but because of his injury Bryan was later stripped of the WWE World Heavyweight Championship by Stephanie McMahon, thus prematurely ended their feud.

Kane and Bryan's feud reignited on the January 12, 2015 episode of Raw, which saw the first action Bryan was a part of in almost a year. A match between the two was scheduled for the return to Thursday episode of SmackDown, which Bryan won by disqualification. On the next week's SmackDown, despite more interference by The Authority, Bryan defeated Kane in a no disqualification main event to keep his Royal Rumble match spot. The feud between Bryan and Kane finally ended on the January 29 episode of SmackDown, where Bryan defeated Kane in a casket match.

On the October 30, 2017 episode of Raw, the lights went out backstage as Bryan had a phone call during discussing Survivor Series with Kurt Angle. Kane then performed a chokeslam on Bryan, causing him to being hospitalized.

=== Reunion (2018) ===
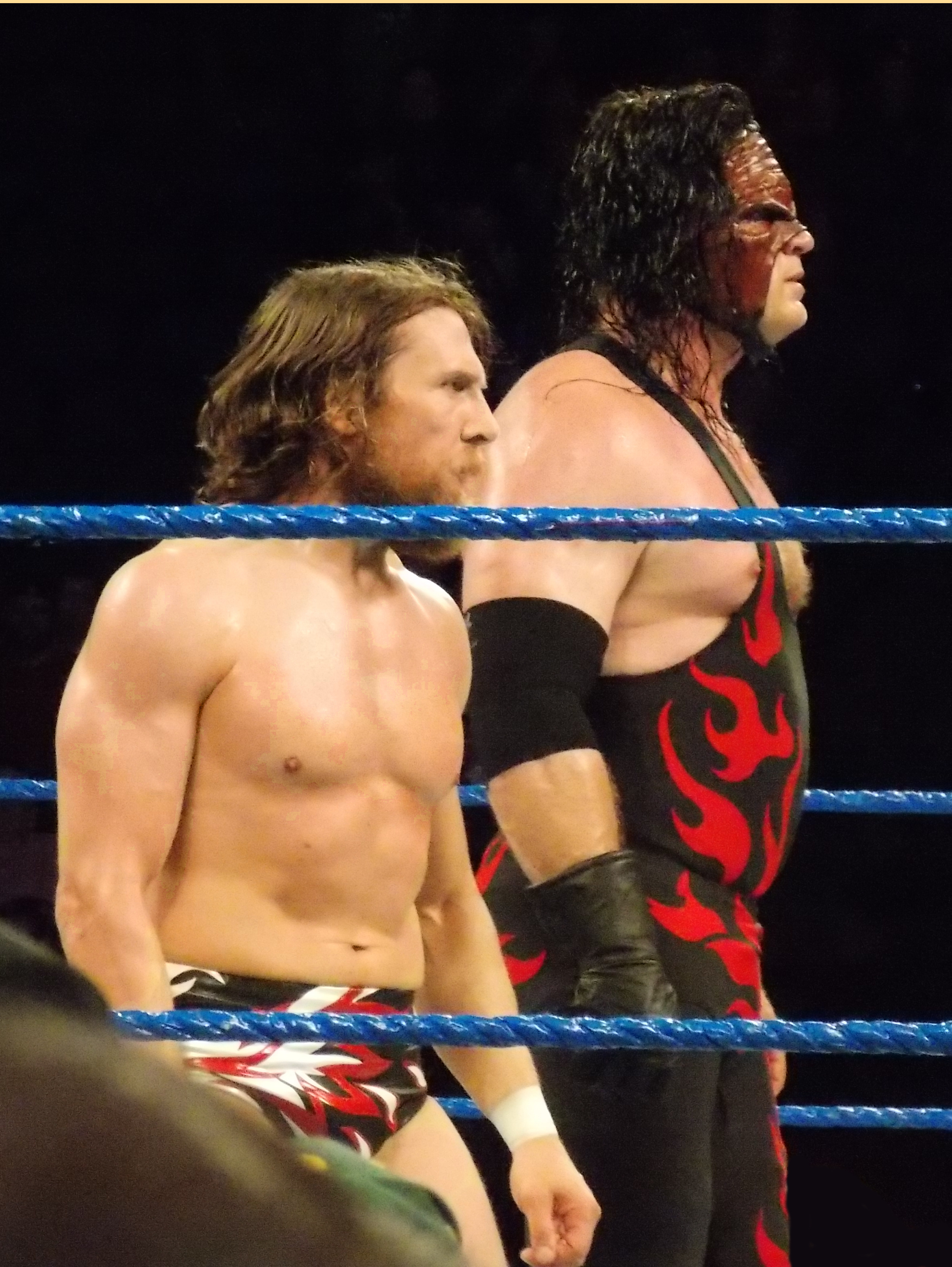
Team Hell No during their reunion in 2018

On the June 26, 2018 episode of SmackDown Live, Kane turned face and saved Bryan from a post-match assault from The Bludgeon Brothers (Harper and Rowan) and afterwards, they shared a hug, officially reuniting Team Hell No as SmackDown General Manager Paige booked them to face The Bludgeon Brothers for the SmackDown Tag Team Championship at Extreme Rules. Their first match in over five years was against The Usos on the July 3 episode of SmackDown Live, in which Kane and Bryan emerged victorious. The following week on SmackDown Live, Bryan and Kane teamed with The New Day in a 10-man tag team Match. At Extreme Rules, Team Hell No were assaulted by The Bludgeon Brothers backstage before their match, resulting in Kane's ankle being (kayfabe) injured. Later in the night, Bryan initially faced Harper and Rowan in a two-on-one handicap match until Kane (wearing a cast) made his way to the ring to join the match, but Team Hell No was still defeated. WWE later acknowledged the injury as a broken ankle, however, the real injury to Kane’s foot was the suffered tendinitis in his left heel. This once again caused the team to disband, which resulted in Daniel Bryan then continuing his feud with The Miz.

=== Sporadic encounters (2020–2021) ===
On the January 17, 2020 episode of SmackDown, Kane returned to do a promo regarding his dominance in the Royal Rumble match, but was interrupted by Bray Wyatt. The Fiend would emerge from inside the ring but Bryan would attack the Fiend with a running knee. The two would subsequently have a brief reunion afterwards.

At the 2021 Royal Rumble event, Kane and Daniel Bryan were both entrants in the Royal Rumble Match. Both of them teased a brief Team Hell No reunion by hugging it out in the middle of the ring, until Kane turned on Bryan by chokeslamming his former partner in the middle of the ring. A few months later, Bryan departed from the WWE and signed with All Elite Wrestling later that year under his real name, Bryan Danielson.

== Championships and accomplishments ==
- Pro Wrestling Illustrated
  - Ranked Daniel Bryan No. 4 of the top 500 singles wrestlers in the PWI 500 in 2012
  - Ranked Kane No. 22 of the top 500 singles wrestlers in the PWI 500 in 2012
- WWE
  - WWE Tag Team Championship (1 time)
