= Luke Harper and Erick Rowan =

American professional wrestling tag team

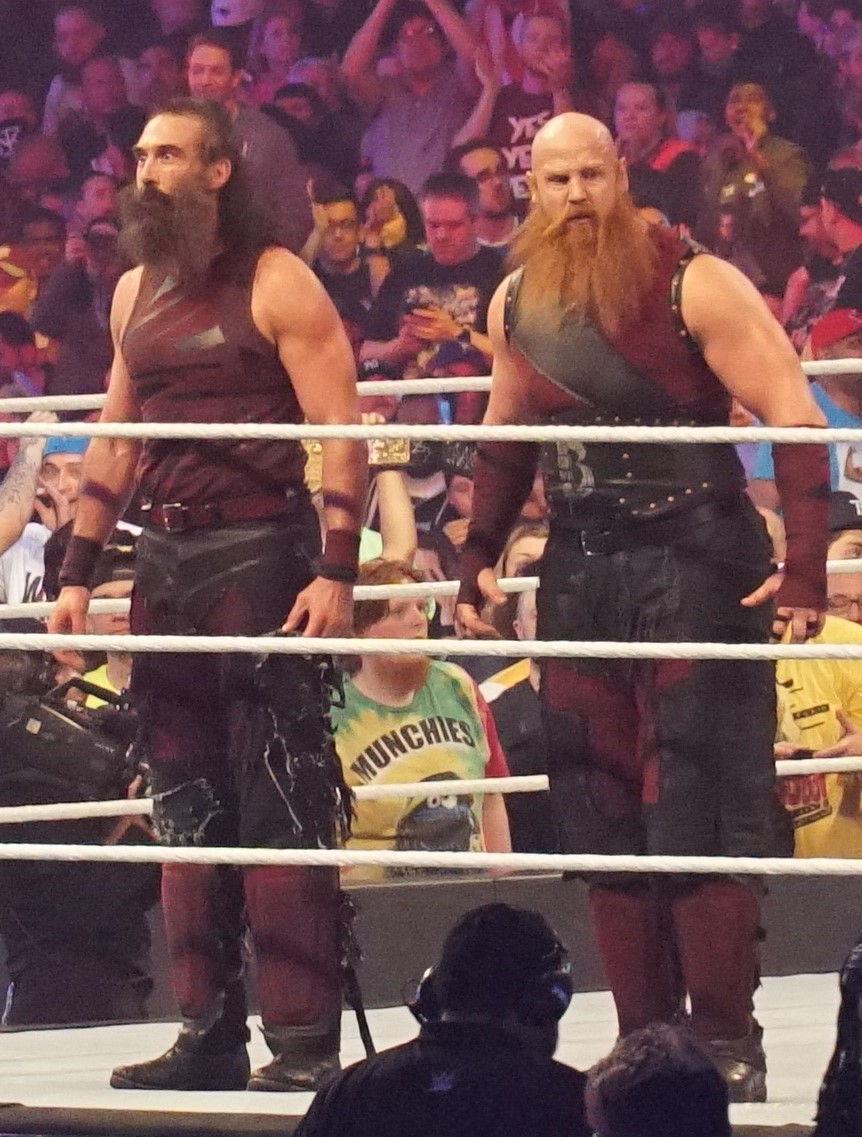
- Harper (left) and Rowan (right) under their Bludgeon Brothers gimmick at WrestleMania 34 in April 2018

Tag team
- Members: Harper/Luke Harper; Rowan/Erick Rowan
- Name(s): Bludgeon Brothers; Luke Harper and Erick Rowan; The Wyatt Family
- Billed heights: Harper: 6 ft 5 in (1.96 m); Rowan: 6 ft 8 in (2.03 m)
- Combined billed weight: 590 lb (270 kg); Harper: 275 lb (125 kg); Rowan: 315 lb (143 kg)
- Debut: June 22, 2012
- Disbanded: October 14, 2019
- Years active: 2012–2014; 2015–2016; 2017–2019

Luke Harper and Erick Rowan, also known as The Bludgeon Brothers, were an American professional wrestling tag team in WWE consisting of Luke Harper and Erick Rowan. They were also known as being members of the cult faction The Wyatt Family, led by Bray Wyatt.

After work at house shows from June 2012 to November 2012, Luke Harper and Erick Rowan made their televised debut as a tag team in January 2013, under the leadership of Bray Wyatt as a part of The Wyatt Family stable. Together, they won the NXT Tag Team Championship in May 2013. They moved to the main roster later that year, eventually starting a feud against each other following the split of The Wyatt Family in late 2014. The duo would reunite in May 2015 and subsequently reconcile with Wyatt, reforming The Wyatt Family. Harper and Rowan suffered injuries during the group's revival, causing the duo to go inactive in 2016.

The duo reunited as a team in October 2017 under the new moniker The Bludgeon Brothers, with their ring names shortened to simply Harper and Rowan. They would go on to capture the SmackDown Tag Team Championship in April 2018 at WrestleMania 34. After losing the titles that August, they spent time apart due to injuries, ultimately reuniting in September 2019, dropping their Bludgeon Brothers gimmick and re-using their original ring names. However, this would be their last time teaming together, as during the 2019 WWE draft, Rowan was drafted to Raw while Harper remained on SmackDown. Harper was then granted his release from the promotion in December due to creative differences, while Rowan was subsequently released in April 2020 due to budget cuts as a result of the COVID-19 pandemic.

Following their respective releases from WWE, Harper signed with All Elite Wrestling (AEW) under the ring name Brodie Lee, while Rowan began working on the independent circuit under the ring name Erick Redbeard. On December 26, 2020, Harper unexpectedly died; during an AEW tribute show on December 30, Rowan appeared for the first time in the promotion and paid tribute to his former tag team partner by holding up a sign in the ring that read: "Goodbye for now, my brother. See you down the road."

== History ==
=== The Wyatt Family (2012–2014) ===
Rowan signed a WWE contract in February 2011 and Harper in March 2012, with both wrestlers performing in NXT's predecessor Florida Championship Wrestling (FCW). After FCW was rebranded to NXT Wrestling, Harper and Rowan debuted on NXT under the leadership of Bray Wyatt to form a faction known as The Wyatt Family in November, with the duo being referred to as Wyatt's "sons". On the January 23, 2013, episode of NXT, Harper and Rowan entered the NXT Tag Team Championship tournament to crown the inaugural champions, defeating the team of Percy Watson and Yoshi Tatsu in the first round. Following a win over Bo Dallas and Michael McGillicutty in the semi-finals with Wyatt's interference, Harper and Rowan went on to the finals of the tournament, but were defeated by Adrian Neville and Oliver Grey.

The Wyatt Family later assaulted Brock lesnar (who had suffered a legitimate injury) while Wyatt prevented Bo Dallas from winning a NXT Championship number one contender match due to Dallas refusal to join The Wyatt Family. On the May 2 episode of NXT, Harper and Rowan won a triple threat elimination tag team match by lastly pinning Neville to earn a shot at the NXT Tag Team Championship. On the May 8 episode of NXT, Harper and Rowan defeated Neville and Dallas, the latter filling in for the injured Grey, to win the NXT Tag Team Championship. After Harper and Rowan won the titles, The Wyatt Family went on to feud with Corey Graves and Kassius Ohno. On the June 19 episode of NXT, The Wyatt Family defeated the team of Graves, Neville and Ohno. On the July 17 episode of NXT, Harper and Rowan lost the NXT Tag Team Championship to Neville and Graves.

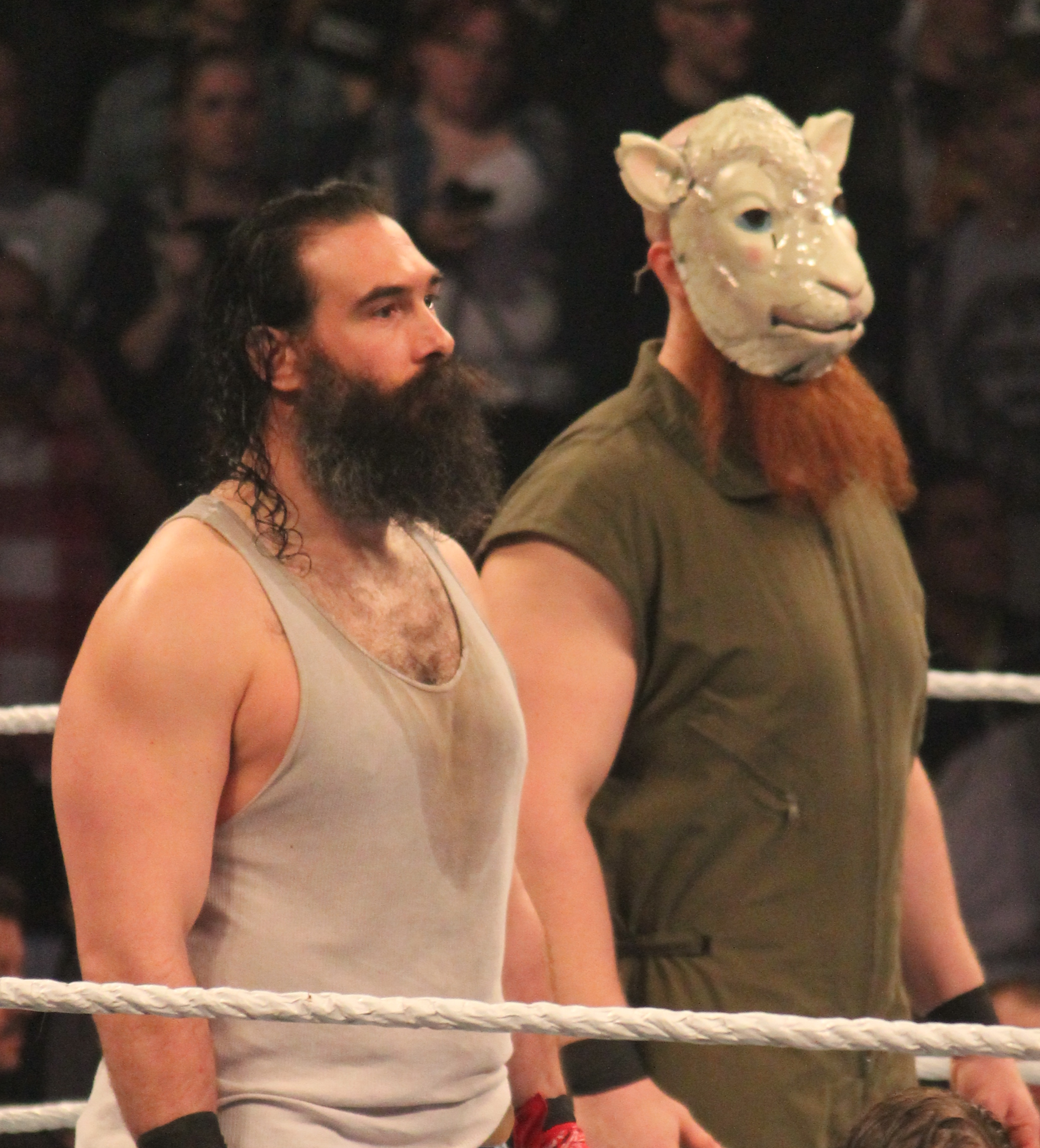
Harper (left) and Rowan (right) in April 2014

From the May 27 episode of Raw, WWE aired vignettes promoting the upcoming main roster debut of The Wyatt Family. The vignettes showed the Wyatt Family's backwoods origins and Rowan wearing a sheep mask. On the July 8 episode of Raw, The Wyatt Family made their debut by assaulting Kane. Harper and Rowan made their main roster in-ring debut on the July 26 episode of SmackDown, where they defeated Tons of Funk (Brodus Clay and Tensai) in a tag team match. Over the next few months, Harper and Rowan competed as a tag team and went on a winning streak over many teams, until Cody Rhodes and Goldust handed them their first loss on the October 11 episode of SmackDown. In early 2014, Harper and Rowan feuded with The Shield, while also supporting Bray Wyatt in his feud with John Cena. While Wyatt and Cena's feud continued, Harper and Rowan also started a feud with The Usos, unsuccessfully challenging for the WWE Tag Team Championship at Money in the Bank and Battleground.

=== Split and feud (2014–2015) ===
On September 29, 2014, vignettes began to air of Bray Wyatt announcing he was setting Luke Harper and Erick Rowan "free". Rowan returned on the October 31 episode of SmackDown, while Harper returned on the November 10 episode of Raw, aligning himself with The Authority. On the November 17 episode of Raw, Rowan joined Team Cena for Survivor Series, opposing Luke Harper and turning into a heroic character. At the event, Rowan's team was victorious. During the match, Harper and Rowan attacked each other, with Rowan ultimately being eliminated from the match by his former partner (with assistance from Seth Rollins).

On the December 8 episode of Raw, Harper and Rowan faced each other in singles competition, with Harper ultimately getting himself disqualified. On the January 5, 2015 episode of Raw, The Authority punished Rowan by putting him in a singles match against Harper, with Harper picking up the win after a discus clothesline and the help of J&J Security (Jamie Noble and Joey Mercury), who were the special guest referees for the match. On the January 22 episode of SmackDown, Harper and Rowan once again competed against each other, this time in a 2015 Royal Rumble qualifying match, with Harper winning and thus not allowing Rowan to participate in the Royal Rumble match. Despite this, Rowan appeared during the Royal Rumble match on January 25, ambushing the number six entrant Curtis Axel, to attack Harper and subsequently sparking a brief Wyatt Family reunion, along with Bray Wyatt, before all three men began to brawl.

=== Reformation and The Wyatt Family reunion (2015–2017) ===
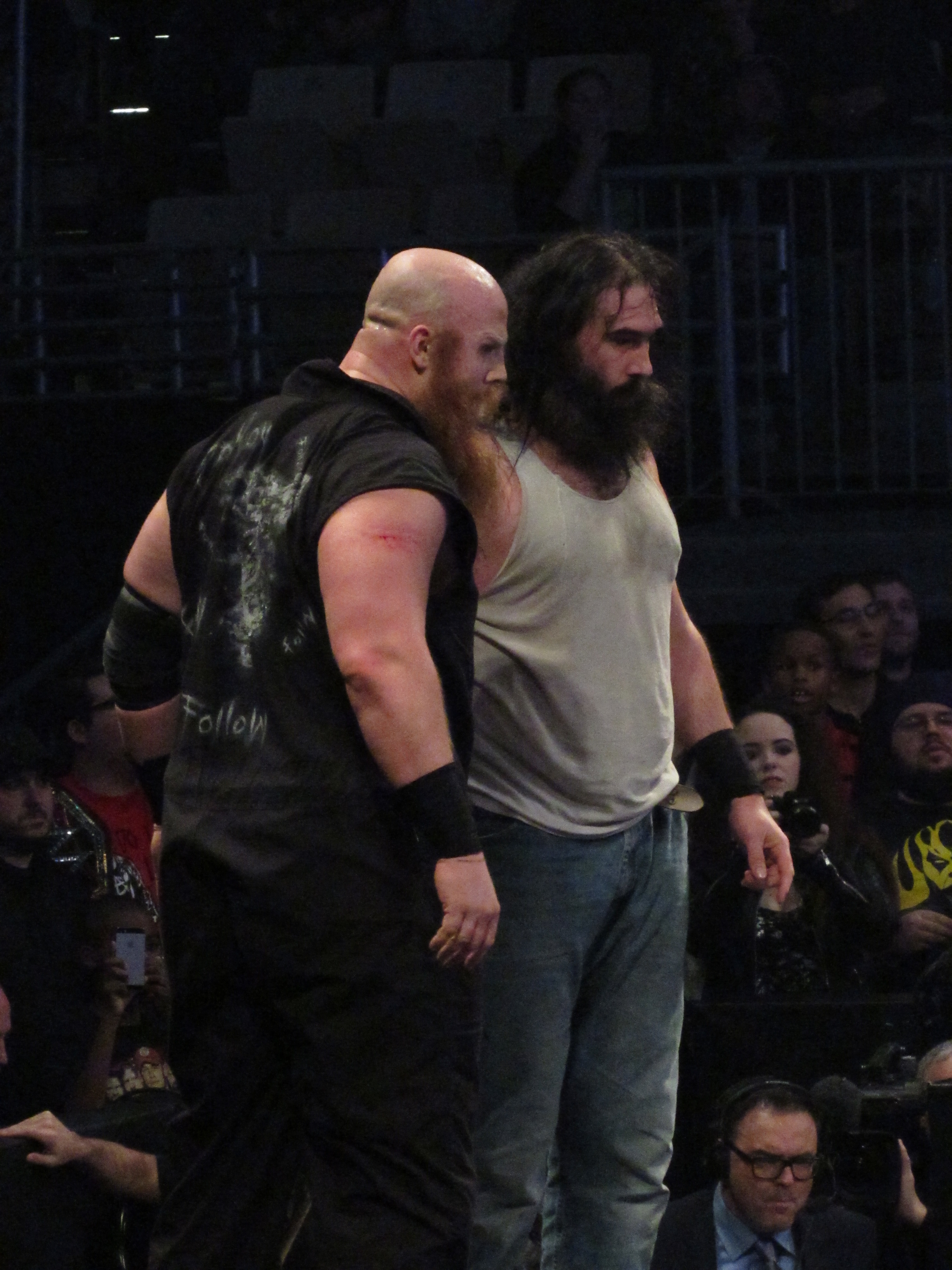
Rowan (left) and Harper (right) in January 2016

On the May 7 episode of SmackDown, Rowan would come out after Harper defeated Fandango, seemingly to confront Harper, but would instead attack Fandango and thus turning into a villain in the process. On the May 11 episode of Raw, Harper and Rowan would officially reunite when Harper accompanied Rowan to his match against Fandango which Rowan won after 30 seconds and the two proceeded to double team Fandango after the match. On the May 18 episode of Raw, Harper and Rowan teamed up to take on Fandango and Zack Ryder, which Rowan and Harper won after a superkick and full nelson slam combination. On the June 4 episode of SmackDown, Harper and Rowan cut a promo about being ostracized and stated they were a family. On the June 5 episode of Superstars, Harper and Rowan defeated Los Matadores in a tag team match, and once again in a rematch the following week on Raw.

In late June, during a match at a live event, Rowan suffered a torn bicep, with reports saying he would be out of action for 4–6 months. On the June 23 episode of Main Event, Harper returned to singles competition when he defeated Cesaro, but not before cutting a promo where he said losing his tag team partner has only made him more dangerous. Harper eventually reunited with Bray Wyatt on July 19 at Battleground by helping him defeat Roman Reigns. After four months of inactivity, Rowan returned from injury on the October 19 episode of Raw, when he filled in for Harper (who was unable to show for personal reasons) to team with Wyatt and Wyatt Family newcomer Braun Strowman, against Roman Reigns, Dean Ambrose and Seth Rollins, which his team won by disqualification after Ambrose attacked Strowman with a kendo stick. During this time, The Wyatt Family feuded with several teams including The Brothers of Destruction (The Undertaker and Kane) and Team ECW (The Dudley Boyz, Tommy Dreamer and Rhyno).

In March 2016, Harper suffered a knee injury during a Raw dark match and it was reported that the injury would sideline him for five to six months. On July 19, at the 2016 WWE draft, Wyatt and Rowan were drafted to SmackDown while Strowman was drafted to Raw, separating him from the group. After the draft, Wyatt and Rowan continued their alliance, and Harper returned at the close of the SmackDown brand's event No Mercy on October 9 in a match between Wyatt and Randy Orton, whom Harper distracted to help Wyatt win the match, thus realigning himself with the group. Prior to Harper's return, Rowan underwent surgery to repair a torn rotator cuff.

During Rowan's absence, Harper betrayed the group, attacking Wyatt and his new ally Randy Orton during the 2017 Royal Rumble. On the April 4 episode of SmackDown, Rowan returned from injury after nearly eight months of inactivity, sporting a new steampunk-style sheep mask, assisting Wyatt in attacking Orton (who had also betrayed Wyatt); Wyatt and Rowan later that went on to lose a tag team match against Orton and Harper. The Wyatt Family seemingly disbanded again when Wyatt was moved to the Raw brand during the 2017 WWE Superstar Shake-up, but despite this Wyatt and Rowan continued their alliance, with Wyatt distracting Orton during his match with Rowan on the April 11 episode of SmackDown. Harper and Rowan continued to rival each other until the feud seemingly ended at Backlash on May 21, where Harper defeated Rowan.

=== The Bludgeon Brothers (2017–2018) ===
After months without appearing on WWE programming, on the October 10 episode of SmackDown, Harper and Rowan returned in a repackage vignette, with the duo wielding mallets and calling themselves "bludgeon brothers". During this time, both Luke Harper and Erick Rowan shortened their ring names, officially being billed as "Harper" and "Rowan". After a month of promotion, Harper and Rowan wrestled their return match as The Bludgeon Brothers on the November 21 episode of SmackDown, defeating The Hype Bros.

After multiple weeks of defeating enhancement talent in squash matches, the Bludgeon Brothers made an appearance at Fastlane on March 11, 2018, interfering during the SmackDown Tag Team Championship bout between defending champions The Usos and The New Day. This would lead to a triple threat tag team match between the three teams for the title at WrestleMania 34, where the Bludgeon Brothers won, earning their first title as a team on the main roster; this was also Rowan's first title on the main roster, and the first win at WrestleMania for both. They would go on to successfully defend the titles against The Usos at the Greatest Royal Rumble, against Luke Gallows and Karl Anderson at Money in the Bank, and against Team Hell No at Extreme Rules.

At SummerSlam, Harper and Rowan defended their titles against The New Day; they lost by disqualication after Rowan attacked Xavier Woods with a mallet, marking their first loss as The Bludgeon Brothers. Two days later on SmackDown, Rowan and Harper lost the titles to The New Day in a no-disqualification match, ending their reign at 135 days. The following day, it was announced that Rowan had suffered a torn right bicep, sidelining him indefinitely. During this time, Harper also underwent surgery due to a wrist injury.

=== Brief reunion and disbandment (2019) ===
Rowan returned alone on January 27, 2019, at the Royal Rumble pay-per-view, where he aided WWE Champion Daniel Bryan in retaining his title against AJ Styles. On March 9, 2019, Harper returned to in-ring action, defeating Mojo Rawley at a live event. Harper then wrestled at WrestleMania 35 and Worlds Collide before taking an extended hiatus from weekly television, and on April 16, requesting his release from WWE. However, at Clash of Champions on September 15, Harper returned, helping Rowan defeat Roman Reigns and reforming their alliance. The two were then defeated by Roman Reigns and Daniel Bryan at Hell in a Cell in a Tornado Tag Team Match. However, this would be their final time teaming together as during the 2019 WWE draft, Rowan was drafted to Raw while Harper remained on SmackDown.

On December 8, 2019, Luke Harper was released from his WWE contract, thus ending the possibility of Harper and Rowan teaming again in WWE. On April 15, 2020, Erick Rowan would also be released from his WWE contract as part of budget cuts stemming from the COVID-19 pandemic. Following their respective releases and after their 90-day non-compete clause had expired, Harper signed with All Elite Wrestling (AEW) under the ring name Brodie Lee, while Rowan began working on the independent circuit under the ring name Erick Redbeard.

On December 26, 2020, Jon Huber (Luke Harper/Brodie Lee) died from lung disease at the age of 41. At AEW's Brodie Lee Celebration of Life on December 30, 2020, an event memorializing Huber, Rowan appeared for the first time in AEW to pay his respects to Huber; Rowan performed a run-in to save Huber's former Dark Order teammates John Silver and Alex Reynolds and their partner Adam Page from interference by Wardlow, helping them defeat The Inner Circle's team of Maxwell Jacob Friedman, Santana and Ortiz. At the end of the match he held up a sign dedicated to his tag team partner and friend: "Goodbye for now, my brother. See you down the road."

== Championships and accomplishments ==
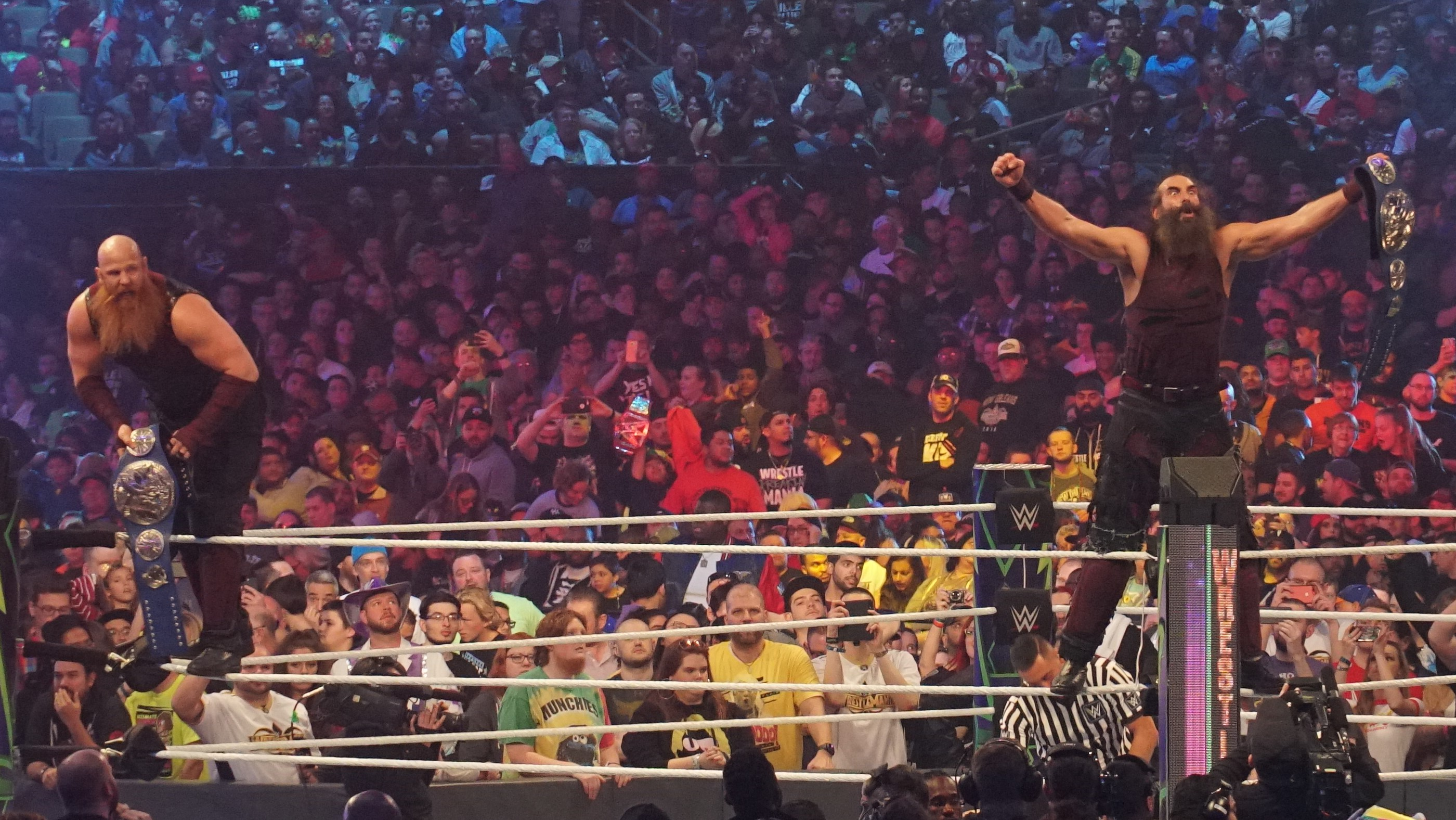
The Bludgeon Brothers after winning the SmackDown Tag Team Championship at WrestleMania 34

- Pro Wrestling Illustrated
  - Ranked Harper No. 34 of the top 500 singles wrestlers in the PWI 500 in 2014
  - Ranked Rowan No. 57 of the top 500 singles wrestlers in the PWI 500 in 2014
- Wrestling Observer Newsletter
  - Best Gimmick (2013) – as a part of The Wyatt Family
- WWE
  - NXT Tag Team Championship (1 time)
  - WWE SmackDown Tag Team Championship (1 time)
