= Carsten Schaefer =

German television presenter

Carsten Schaefer (born 8 May 1960) is a German TV and radio host, professional wrestling commentator and ring announcer best known for his time in WWE. He has hosted WWF/E shows for over 30 years. Nobody worldwide commented WWF/E shows that long in a row.

== Early life ==
Schaefer was born 8 May 1960 in Mönchengladbach. In his youth, Schaefer lived in England until the early 1980s and developed an interest in wrestling.

== Career ==
In 1987, he appeared on a TV show about the Guinness World Records and worked for the TV Chanal Tele5 as an editor, translator and voice actor. In March 1989, he joined the WWF show "Ring frei". Until April 2017, he was featured regularly on nearly every WWF/E show on EuroSport, Tele 5, RTL II, tm3, DSF, DSFaction, Premiere, Sky Sport and ProSieben Maxx. He translated the WWE magazine into German for Egmont Ehapa Media and is heard on many VHS and DVD releases from the WWE as a translator or commentator. He was part of the German announce team for WWE Pay-per-view and WWE Network events. in December 2020, Schaefer was released by WWE after 32 years.

In 2008, he got a cameo in the movie 1½ Knights: In Search of the Ravishing Princess Herzelinde. The day before Money in the Bank 2018, he suffered a heart attack. He is a radio host on RauteMusik.FM and a certified interpreter and translator.
