= Hell in a Cell (2014) =

WWE pay-per-view and livestreaming event

- DVD cover featuring Dean Ambrose inside the Hell in a Cell structure
- Promotion: WWE
- Date: October 26, 2014
- City: Dallas, Texas
- Venue: American Airlines Center
- Attendance: 15,303
- Buy rate: 83,000 (excluding WWE Network views)

WWE event chronology
← Previous; Night of Champions	Next → Survivor Series

Hell in a Cell chronology
← Previous; 2013	Next → 2015

The 2014 Hell in a Cell was a professional wrestling pay-per-view (PPV) and livestreaming event produced by WWE. It was the sixth annual Hell in a Cell event and took place on October 26, 2014, at the American Airlines Center in Dallas, Texas. The event centered on the men's Hell in a Cell match, a 20-foot-high roofed steel cage that surrounds the ring and ringside area with no countouts or disqualifications and the only way to win is by pinfall or submission in the ring.

Eight matches were contested on the main card while one match took place on the Kickoff pre-show. The card featured two Hell in a Cell matches, where in the main event, Seth Rollins defeated Dean Ambrose, and on the undercard, John Cena defeated Randy Orton to secure a future WWE World Heavyweight Championship match.

This was the first Hell in a Cell event to livestream on the WWE Network, which launched in February. The event had 83,000 pay-per-view buys (excluding WWE Network views), down from the previous year's 228,000 buys. It was also the second Hell in a Cell event to be held at the American Airlines Center, after the 2010 event.

== Production ==
=== Background ===
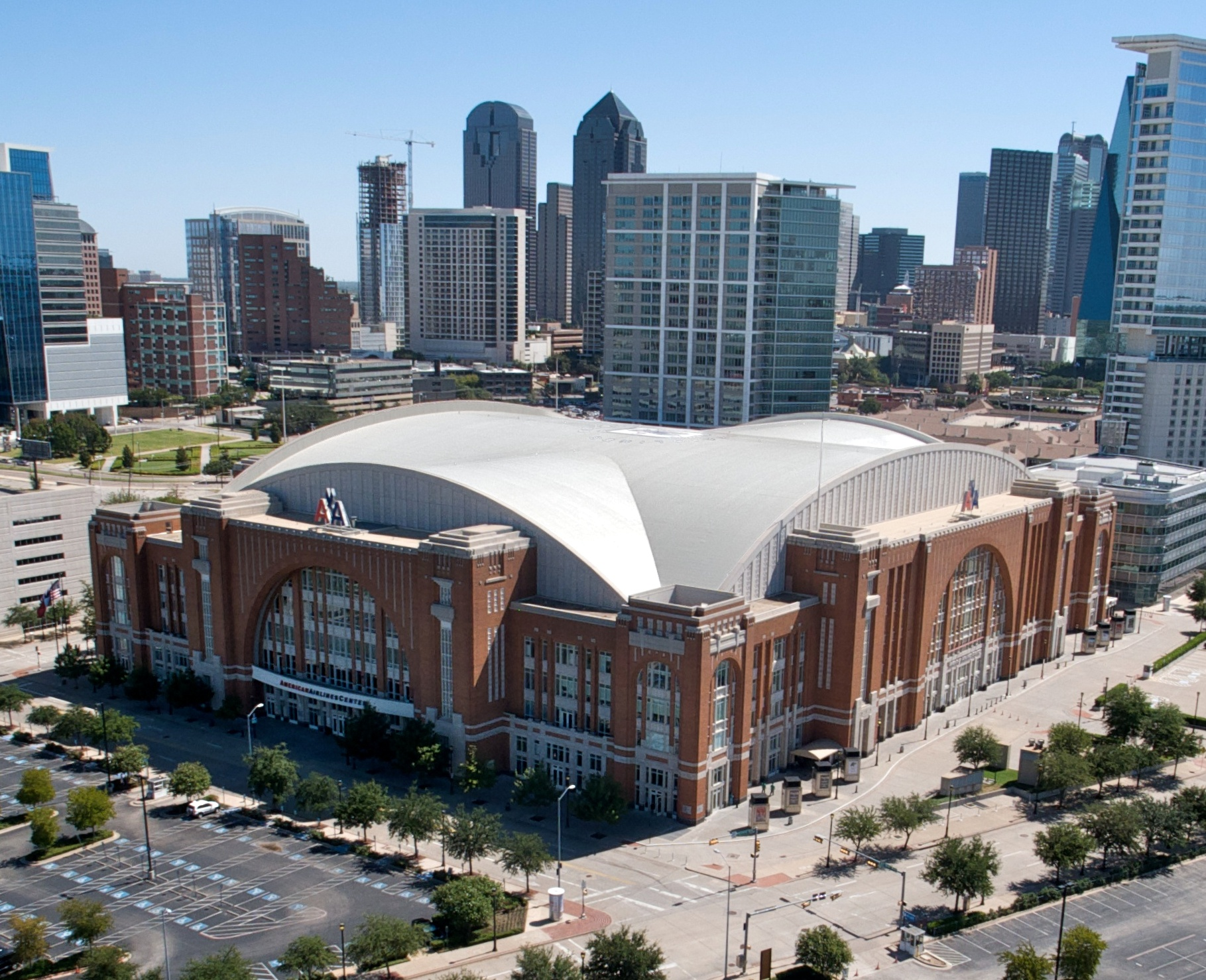
The sixth annual Hell in a Cell was the second time for the event to be held at the American Airlines Center in Dallas, Texas, after 2010.

Hell in a Cell was an annual professional wrestling pay-per-view (PPV) event produced every October by WWE since 2009. The concept of the event came from WWE's established Hell in a Cell match, in which competitors fought inside a 20-foot-high roofed cell structure surrounding the ring and ringside area. The main event match of the card was contested under the Hell in a Cell stipulation. The sixth Hell in a Cell event was held on October 26, 2014, at the American Airlines Center in Dallas, Texas, marking the second Hell in a Cell held at the venue, after the 2010 event. In addition to airing on traditional pay-per-view worldwide, it was the first Hell in a Cell event to livestream on the WWE Network, which launched in February.

=== Storylines ===
The event comprised nine matches, including one on the Kickoff pre-show, that resulted from scripted storylines. Results were predetermined by WWE's writers, while storylines were produced on WWE's weekly television shows, Raw and SmackDown.

At Night of Champions, Dean Ambrose returned to WWE after a one-month hiatus, attacking Seth Rollins. Later that night, John Cena defeated Brock Lesnar by disqualification for the WWE World Heavyweight Championship when Rollins attacked Cena. Rollins then attempted to cash in his Money in the Bank contract on Lesnar, but was stopped by Cena. On the September 29 episode of Raw, Cena and Ambrose defeated Kane and Randy Orton by disqualification after Rollins attacked Ambrose. On the October 6 episode of Raw, Cena defeated Rollins, Orton, and Kane by disqualification in a handicap match. Triple H then announced that Cena would face Ambrose at the pay-per-view, with the winner facing Rollins later in the night in a Hell in a Cell match. On the October 10 episode of SmackDown, during the Miz TV segment, it was announced by The Miz that the match would be a No Holds Barred Contract on a Pole match. On the October 13 episode of Raw, Triple H announced that the Cena–Ambrose match would take place on Raw in the main event and the winner would face Rollins. Later in the show, Orton was granted by Triple H a match against the loser of the Contract on a Pole match, also taking place in a Hell in a Cell match at the event. Ambrose went on to win the match against Cena, thus setting up Ambrose vs. Rollins and Cena vs. Orton. On the October 20 episode of Raw, Triple H announced that the match between Cena and Orton would be a number one contender match for the WWE World Heavyweight Title.

At Night of Champions, AJ Lee defeated Paige to win the Divas Championship in a triple threat match that also included Nikki Bella. On the September 29 episode of Raw, Paige and Alicia Fox attacked AJ after Fox defeated AJ. The following week, Paige and Fox defeated AJ and Emma. On the October 10 episode of SmackDown, AJ defeated Fox, after which AJ and Paige attacked each other. On the October 13 episode of Raw, AJ and Layla defeated Paige and Fox. On the October 17 episode of SmackDown, AJ defeated Layla, after which Paige attacked AJ On October 20, it was announced on WWE.com that AJ would defend the title against Paige at Hell in a Cell.

At SummerSlam, Nikki Bella turned heel and attacked Brie Bella during her match against Stephanie McMahon, costing Brie the match in the process. On the October 13 episode of Raw, during a WWE.com exclusive, Nikki interrupted Brie's interview with the news that they will face off at the event, concluding that the loser of the match would become the winner's personal assistant for one month. However, if the loser fails to perform those duties, she would be terminated from WWE.

Since losing the Intercontinental Championship back to Dolph Ziggler, The Miz began feuding with United States Champion Sheamus after several tag matches with his "stunt double" "Damien Mizdow" against Sheamus and Ziggler. On the October 6 episode of Raw, The Miz defeated Sheamus due to interference by Damien Mizdow. On the October 13 episode, The Miz defeated Sheamus via count–out. On October 14, WWE.com announced that Sheamus would defend the title against Miz at the event.

On the September 26 episode of SmackDown, Big Show defeated Rusev by disqualification after Rusev hit Big Show with a Russian flag. On the September 29 episode of Raw, Big Show attacked Rusev and tore down a Russian flag. On the October 3 episode of Smackdown, Rusev attacked Big Show. On the October 13 episode of Raw, Rusev defeated Big Show by disqualification after Mark Henry attacked Rusev. On October 14, WWE.com announced that Big Show would face Rusev at Hell in a Cell.

At Night of Champions, Gold and Stardust defeated The Usos (Jey Uso and Jimmy Uso) to win the WWE Tag Team Championship. The two teams had a title rematch on the September 26 episode where The Usos won via disqualification, but not the titles. In the following weeks, the two teams clashed in six-man tag team matches, which The Usos won. On October 20, it was announced on WWE.com that another title rematch was scheduled for Hell in a Cell.

On the September 22 episode of Raw, Dolph Ziggler defeated The Miz to win the Intercontinental Championship. On the September 26 episode of SmackDown, Cesaro won a battle royal to face Ziggler for the title later in the night. Later in the night, Ziggler defeated Cesaro, but Cesaro was holding the bottom rope and the referee didn't see it. On the September 29 episode of Raw, Ziggler successfully defended the title in a triple threat match against The Miz and Cesaro. On the October 20 episode of Raw, Cesaro defeated Ziggler in a non-title match. On the October 24 episode of Smackdown, Ziggler successfully defended the title against Cesaro. Later in the night, it was announced that Ziggler would defend the title against Cesaro in a two out of three falls match at the event.

The Kickoff pre-show featured a special broadcast of "Mizdow TV" with The Miz as the special guest.

== Event ==
Other on-screen personnel
Role:	Name:
English commentators	Michael Cole
English commentators	Jerry Lawler
English commentators	John "Bradshaw" Layfield
Spanish commentators	Carlos Cabrera
Spanish commentators	Marcelo Rodriguez
Interviewer	Byron Saxton
Ring announcers	Lilian Garcia
Ring announcers	Eden Stiles
Referees	Mike Chioda
Referees	John Cone
Referees	Chad Patton
Referees	Matt Bennett
Referees	Darrick Moore
Referees	Rod Zapata
Pre-show panel	Renee Young
Pre-show panel	Alex Riley
Pre-show panel	Booker T
Pre-show panel	Paul Heyman

=== Pre-show ===
The analysis team was hosted by Renee Young and consisted of Alex Riley, Booker T, and special guest Paul Heyman.

The Hell in a Cell Kickoff pre-show featured a segment of "Mizdow TV", hosted by Damien Mizdow with The Miz as the special guest. Mizdow asked Miz what are his chances of winning the WWE United States Championship later in the night. Sheamus appeared on the TitanTron and said that Miz would suffer a Brogue Kick instead.

Later, Mark Henry faced Bo Dallas. Henry executed a World's Strongest Slam on Dallas to win the match.

=== Preliminary matches ===
The actual pay-per-view opened with Dolph Ziggler defending the Intercontinental Championship against Cesaro in a two out of three falls match. Ziggler won the first fall by pinning Cesaro with a roll-up. Cesaro executed a Pop Up European Uppercut on Ziggler for a nearfall, while Ziggler executed a Famouser for another nearfall. Ziggler won the match after executing a Zig-Zag on Cesaro, winning the match 2 falls to 0 and retaining the title.

Next, Nikki Bella faced Brie Bella. Nikki executed a Rack Attack on Brie for a near-fall. Brie applied the Yes! Lock on Nikki, who reached the ropes. Nikki executed a second Rack Attack to win the match, making Brie her personal assistant for 1 month.

After that, Goldust and Stardust defended the Tag Team Championship against The Usos (Jey Uso and Jimmy Uso). Goldust executed a Final Cut on Jey to win the match for his team.

In the fourth match, John Cena faced Randy Orton for a future shot at the WWE World Heavyweight Championship in a Hell in a Cell match, the second time the two had faced off inside the structure at the event after the 2009 event. During the match, Orton executed an RKO on Cena for a near-fall. As Orton and Cena traded counters, Orton attacked Cena with a low-blow for a near-fall. Cena applied the STF but Orton escaped. Cena finally executed an Attitude Adjustment for a near-fall. Cena attempted another Attitude Adjustment but Orton countered into another RKO for a near-fall. Cena executed another Attitude Adjustment for a near-fall. Cena won the match after he executed a Super Attitude Adjustment through a table.

Next, Sheamus defended the United States Championship against The Miz. Damien Mizdow mimicked attacks and defenses throughout the match. The Miz executed a Skull Crushing Finale for a near-fall. Sheamus won the match after executing a Brogue Kick.

After that, Big Show faced Rusev (accompanied by Lana). Rusev forced Big Show to submit to The Accolade to win the match.

In the penultimate match, AJ Lee defended the Divas Championship against Paige (accompanied by Alicia Fox). AJ forced Paige to submit to the Black Widow to win the match.

=== Main event ===
In the main event, Dean Ambrose faced Seth Rollins in a Hell in a Cell match. Ambrose climbed the cell before the match began, and Jamie Noble and Joey Mercury emerged and tried to coax him down. Mercury and Noble climbed the cell but Ambrose attacked them with a kendo stick, allowing Rollins to climb the cell and attack Ambrose. Both attacked each other until they fell off the side of the cage and through the announce tables (similar to Mick Foley's famous 1998 incident). Both were placed onto stretchers until Ambrose recovered and attacked Rollins. The match officially started when both participants entered the cell. Ambrose sat on a chair while taunting Rollins and berating him for his betrayal. Ambrose performed a Diving Elbow Drop through a table on Rollins. Ambrose attempted to put Rollins through cinder blocks but Rollins avoided it. Kane sprayed a fire extinguisher at Ambrose through the cell, allowing Rollins to perform a Powerbomb through a table on Ambrose. Rollins executed a Curb Stomp on Ambrose for a near-fall. As Ambrose attempted a Curb Stomp on Rollins, the arena lights cut out and Bray Wyatt's lantern appeared in the middle of the ring, spraying out smoke and projecting an image of a ghostly specter while Wyatt was heard reciting an incantation. Wyatt emerged from the smoke and executed a Uranage Slam on Ambrose, who was then pinned by Rollins for the victory. After the match, Wyatt executed a Sister Abigail on Ambrose and laughed maniacally until the event ended.

== Reception ==
The event received generally positive reviews. James Caldwell of Pro Wrestling Torch rated the Bella match and the Divas championship match between AJ Lee and Paige with 2 stars each, saying that Brie Bella's loss "[made] the babyface seem weak", while calling the Divas championship match a "solid match", but at the same time asking "Now, where do they go with A.J. and Paige after putting an end to their game of hot potato with the title?", referring to the title changes that the two exchanged at SummerSlam and Night of Champions. Caldwell didn't rate the Rollins vs. Ambrose match, stating that it was a "chaotic match fitting the feud", but with "a questionable TV-style finish to a main event.

== Aftermath ==
The next night on Raw, Big Show and Mark Henry faced Gold and Stardust for the WWE Tag Team Championships. Henry turned heel when an argument ensued between him and Show when he executed the World's Strongest Slam on Show, thus costing themselves the match. After the match, Henry executed three World's Strongest Slams on Show. On the November 3 episode, Henry and Show faced each other which Show won by disqualification after getting hit with a chair. The two continued the feud as both of them were on opposing teams of Team Cena/Team Authority at Survivor Series (Show on Team Cena, Henry on Team Authority).

Randy Orton, who was Curb Stomped by Seth Rollins on the Raw prior to Hell in a Cell, managed to get his retribution the next week. Orton turned face after he attacked Rollins with an RKO. In the process, he was no longer associated with the villainous stable The Authority. On the November 3 episode of Raw, Orton lost to Rollins in the main event. Orton was eventually attacked by fellow Authority member Kane, injuring him (in kayfabe) and leaving him to bleed. This was done so Orton could take leave to begin production on The Condemned 2: Desert Prey.

Meanwhile, with The Authority unhappy following John Cena's win to earn another shot at the WWE World Heavyweight Championship, Triple H challenged a team captained by Cena (including himself) to a traditional Survivor Series elimination match at the eponymous pay-per-view. Later that night, Cena faced Rollins in the main event. Cena won by disqualification after Kane got involved. This triggered a massive brawl involving the entire locker room, although Cena still stood tall in the end.

Eleven years later, Randy Orton and John Cena had one last match at Backlash, for the Undisputed WWE Championship, albeit Orton as fan favourite and Cena as a heel. Cena would win the match to end the historic rivalry.

== Results ==
No.	Results	Stipulations	Times
1^{P}	Mark Henry defeated Bo Dallas by pinfall	Singles match	0:35
2	Dolph Ziggler (c) defeated Cesaro by 2–0	Two out of three falls match for the WWE Intercontinental Championship	12:18
3	Nikki Bella defeated Brie Bella by pinfall	Singles match The loser had to become the winner's personal assistant for one month, and if she had refused, she would have been fired.	6:22
4	Goldust and Stardust (c) defeated The Usos (Jey Uso and Jimmy Uso) by pinfall	Tag team match for the WWE Tag Team Championship	10:21
5	John Cena defeated Randy Orton by pinfall	Hell in a Cell match to determine the #1 contender for the WWE World Heavyweight Championship	25:52
6	Sheamus (c) defeated The Miz (with Damien Mizdow) by pinfall	Singles match for the WWE United States Championship	8:20
7	Rusev (with Lana) defeated Big Show by submission	Singles match	7:55
8	AJ Lee (c) defeated Paige (with Alicia Fox) by submission	Singles match for the WWE Divas Championship	6:50
9	Seth Rollins (with Jamie Noble and Joey Mercury) defeated Dean Ambrose by pinfall	Hell in a Cell match	14:03
(c) / – the champion(s) heading into the match; P / – the match was broadcast on the pre-show
