= WWE Hell in a Cell =

WWE pay-per-view and livestreaming event series

- WWE Hell in a Cell logo
- Promotions: WWE
- Brands: Raw (2009–2010, 2016, 2018–2022); SmackDown (2009–2010, 2017–2022); ECW (2009)
- First event: 2009
- Last event: 2022
- Signature matches: Hell in a Cell match

WWE Hell in a Cell was a professional wrestling event produced annually by WWE, a Connecticut-based professional wrestling promotion. It was broadcast live and available only through pay-per-view (PPV) and the livestreaming services Peacock and the WWE Network. First held in 2009, the concept of the show came from WWE's established Hell in a Cell match, in which competitors fought inside a 20-foot-high roofed cell structure surrounding the ring and ringside area. Each main event match of the card was contested under the Hell in a Cell stipulation, while one or two other Hell in a Cell matches typically also occurred on the undercard.

Hell in a Cell replaced No Mercy in the October slot of WWE's pay-per-view calendar. In 2018, it was moved up to the September slot, but returned to October the following year before moving up to June in 2021. Hell in a Cell was introduced during WWE's first brand extension period, and the inaugural event featured the Raw, SmackDown, and ECW brands. ECW was disbanded in 2010 and the first brand split ended in 2011. The brand split returned in 2016, and that year's event was held exclusively for Raw, while the 2017 event was SmackDown-exclusive. Brand-exclusive PPVs were then discontinued following WrestleMania 34 in 2018. During the COVID-19 pandemic (2020–2021), Hell in a Cell was the only PPV event to be held twice in WWE's bio-secure bubble called the ThunderDome; the 2021 event was also the final PPV to be held in the ThunderDome before WWE resumed live touring in July that year. Hell in a Cell was then discontinued after the 2022 event and its slot was replaced by the resurrected Night of Champions event.

== History ==
In early 2009, World Wrestling Entertainment (WWE) ran a poll on their website allowing fans to pick the name for that year's October pay-per-view (PPV), which would feature the promotion's established Hell in a Cell match. Hell in a Cell was chosen over No Escape, Locked Up, and Rage in a Cage. The inaugural Hell in a Cell PPV then took place on October 4, 2009, replacing WWE's previously annual October PPV, No Mercy. While originally only available on PPV, it also became available on WWE's online streaming service, the WWE Network, beginning with the 2014 event, and then also Peacock in 2021 after the American version of the WWE Network merged under Peacock in March that year.

The event was introduced during WWE's first brand extension period, where the promotion divided its roster into brands where wrestlers were exclusively assigned to perform. The inaugural event in turn featured wrestlers from the Raw, SmackDown, and ECW brands, but it would be the only to feature ECW as the brand was disbanded in February 2010. In April 2011, the promotion ceased using its full name, with "WWE" becoming an orphaned initialism. That August, the first brand extension ended. The 2011 event was the first held following the end of the brand split and was notable for featuring the first triple threat match contested inside Hell in a Cell.

After five years, the brand extension was reinstated in 2016, with that year's event held as a Raw-exclusive PPV. This event was notable for having the first women's Hell in a Cell match, which was also the first women's match to main event a WWE PPV. The 2017 edition was then held as a SmackDown-exclusive show. It was notable for having the first Hell in a Cell match with an added stipulation of falls count anywhere, as well as the first in which a tag team championship was defended in a Hell in a Cell match. Following WrestleMania 34 in April 2018, brand-exclusive PPVs were discontinued. The 2018 event was then moved up to September, but the event moved back to October in 2019.

The 2020 event was notable for having the first "I Quit" match contested inside of the Hell in a Cell structure. Due to the COVID-19 pandemic, the event was held in WWE's bio-secure bubble called the WWE ThunderDome, which was hosted at the Amway Center in Orlando, Florida. In 2021, the event was moved up to June and was WWE's final PPV to be produced from the WWE ThunderDome—which had been relocated to the Yuengling Center in Tampa, Florida—due to the company's resumption of live touring in mid-July. As a result, Hell in a Cell was the only PPV to be held twice in the ThunderDome. The 2022 event was also held in June and at the Allstate Arena in Rosemont, Illinois.

The 2022 event would be the final Hell in a Cell event produced, as in 2023, WWE officially discontinued the event. Its slot was initially replaced by what was to be a revival of King of the Ring, rebranded as "King and Queen of the Ring", but that was changed to Night of Champions, in turn reviving Night of Champions. This came after reports that WWE Chief Content Officer Triple H wanted to discontinue some of the gimmick events like Hell in a Cell so that the match itself could return to being the culmination of big feuds instead of something that has to be done each year because of the event.

== Concept ==
The concept of the show came from WWE's established Hell in a Cell match, in which competitors fought inside a 20-foot-high roofed cell structure surrounding the ring and ringside area. Each main event match of the card was contested under the Hell in a Cell stipulation, while one or two other Hell in a Cell matches typically also occurred on the undercard. Variants of the Hell in a Cell stipulation were featured, some of which were "firsts," for example, the 2011 event had the first triple threat match contested inside the Hell in a Cell structure. The 2018 event also saw a redesign of the Hell in a Cell structure, which was entirely painted crimson-red and became smaller, with the wires being less pliable, making the structure stronger, yet lighter.

== Events ==
Raw-branded event	SmackDown-branded event

#	Event	Date	City	Venue	Main event	Ref.
1	Hell in a Cell (2009)	October 4, 2009	Newark, New Jersey	Prudential Center	D-Generation X (Shawn Michaels and Triple H) vs. The Legacy (Cody Rhodes and Ted DiBiase) in a Tornado tag team Hell in a Cell match	
2	Hell in a Cell (2010)	October 3, 2010	Dallas, Texas	American Airlines Center	Kane (c) vs. The Undertaker in a Hell in a Cell match for the World Heavyweight Championship	
3	Hell in a Cell (2011)	October 2, 2011	New Orleans, Louisiana	New Orleans Arena	John Cena (c) vs. Alberto Del Rio vs. CM Punk in a Triple threat Hell in a Cell match for the WWE Championship	
4	Hell in a Cell (2012)	October 28, 2012	Atlanta, Georgia	Philips Arena	CM Punk (c) vs. Ryback in a Hell in a Cell match for the WWE Championship	
5	Hell in a Cell (2013)	October 27, 2013	Miami, Florida	American Airlines Arena	Daniel Bryan vs. Randy Orton in a Hell in a Cell match for the vacant WWE Championship with Shawn Michaels as the special guest referee	
6	Hell in a Cell (2014)	October 26, 2014	Dallas, Texas	American Airlines Center	Dean Ambrose vs. Seth Rollins in a Hell in a Cell match	
7	Hell in a Cell (2015)	October 25, 2015	Los Angeles, California	Staples Center	Brock Lesnar vs. The Undertaker in a Hell in a Cell match	
8	Hell in a Cell (2016)	October 30, 2016	Boston, Massachusetts	TD Garden	Sasha Banks (c) vs. Charlotte Flair in a Hell in a Cell match for the WWE Raw Women's Championship	
9	Hell in a Cell (2017)	October 8, 2017	Detroit, Michigan	Little Caesars Arena	Kevin Owens vs. Shane McMahon in a Falls Count Anywhere Hell in a Cell match	
10	Hell in a Cell (2018)	September 16, 2018	San Antonio, Texas	AT&T Center	Roman Reigns (c) vs. Braun Strowman in a Hell in a Cell match for the WWE Universal Championship with Mick Foley as the special guest referee. This was also Braun Strowman's Money in the Bank cash-in match, which was announced prior to the event.	
11	Hell in a Cell (2019)	October 6, 2019	Sacramento, California	Golden 1 Center	Seth Rollins (c) vs. "The Fiend" Bray Wyatt in a Hell in a Cell match for the WWE Universal Championship	
12	Hell in a Cell (2020)	October 25, 2020	Orlando, Florida	WWE ThunderDome at Amway Center	Drew McIntyre (c) vs. Randy Orton in a Hell in a Cell match for the WWE Championship	
13	Hell in a Cell (2021)	June 20, 2021	Tampa, Florida	WWE ThunderDome at Yuengling Center	Bobby Lashley (c) vs. Drew McIntyre in a Last Chance Hell in a Cell match for the WWE Championship	
14	Hell in a Cell (2022)	June 5, 2022	Rosemont, Illinois	Allstate Arena	Cody Rhodes vs. Seth "Freakin" Rollins in a Hell in a Cell match	
(c) – refers to the champion(s) heading into the match

== See also ==
- WWE Bad Blood
