= Hell in a Cell (2021) =

WWE pay-per-view and livestreaming event

- Promotional poster featuring Bobby Lashley and the Hell in a Cell structure in the background.
- Promotion: WWE
- Brand(s): Raw; SmackDown
- Date: June 20, 2021
- City: Tampa, Florida
- Venue: WWE ThunderDome at Yuengling Center
- Attendance: 0 (behind closed doors) (Note: The event was held without a paying audience due to the COVID-19 pandemic in the United States, though it did feature a live crowd of virtual fans via WWE's ThunderDome viewing experience.)

WWE event chronology
← Previous; NXT TakeOver: In Your House	Next → Money in the Bank

Hell in a Cell chronology
← Previous; 2020	Next → 2022

The 2021 Hell in a Cell was a professional wrestling pay-per-view (PPV) and livestreaming event produced by WWE, held for wrestlers from the promotion's main roster brands, Raw and SmackDown. It was the 13th annual Hell in a Cell event and due to the COVID-19 pandemic, it took place on June 20, 2021, from the WWE ThunderDome, a bio-secure bubble that at the time was hosted at the Yuengling Center in Tampa, Florida. The event centered on the Hell in a Cell match, a 20-foot-high roofed steel cage that surrounds the ring and ringside area with no countouts or disqualifications and the only way to win is by pinfall or submission in the ring.

Seven matches were contested at the event, including one on the Kickoff pre-show. Two Hell in a Cell matches were contested with one for each brand. In the main event, which was Raw's Hell in a Cell match, Bobby Lashley defeated Drew McIntyre to retain the WWE Championship with an added stipulation that it was a Last Chance match. In the other Hell in a Cell match, which was the opening bout, Bianca Belair defeated Bayley to retain the SmackDown Women's Championship. In other prominent matches, Charlotte Flair defeated Raw Women's Champion Rhea Ripley by disqualification, thus Ripley retained the title as titles do not change hands by disqualification unless stipulated, and Seth Rollins defeated Cesaro.

This was WWE's final PPV and livestreaming event to be broadcast from the ThunderDome, and subsequently the final such event in WWE's residency at the Yuengling Center, due to the company's resumption of live touring with fans in mid-July. This also made Hell in a Cell the only PPV and livestreaming event to be produced from the ThunderDome twice, with the prior year's event broadcast from the bio-secure bubble's original location of the Amway Center in Orlando, Florida. It was also the first Hell in a Cell event to be held in June, as the event was generally held in October, and only the second time the event was not held in October, the first of which was the September 2018 edition. This was also the first Hell in a Cell event to livestream on SonyLIV in India and Peacock in the United States following the shutdown of the Indian version of the WWE Network in February and the American version in April.

== Production ==
=== Background ===
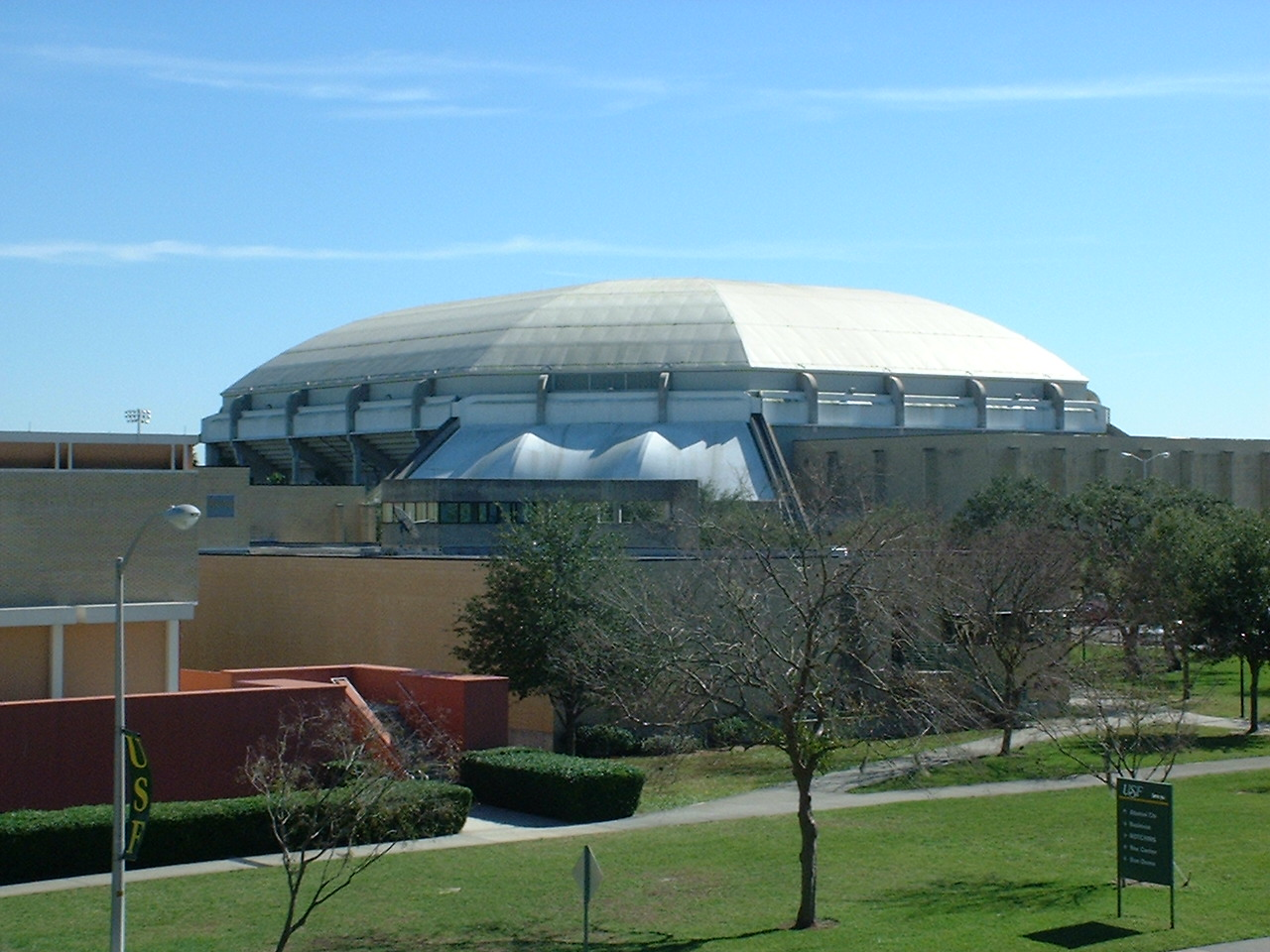
Due to the COVID-19 pandemic, the 13th annual Hell in a Cell event was produced by way of a bio-secure bubble called the WWE ThunderDome, which at the time was hosted held at the Yuengling Center in Tampa, Florida. This was WWE's final pay-per-view and livestreaming event to be broadcast from the ThunderDome due to the company's resumption of live touring with fans in mid-July.

Hell in a Cell was an annual professional wrestling event produced by WWE since 2009, generally held in October. It was originally broadcast exclusively via pay-per-view (PPV) before it began simultaneously livestreaming on the WWE Network in 2014. The concept of the event came from WWE's established Hell in a Cell match, in which competitors fought inside a 20-foot-high roofed cell structure surrounding the ring and ringside area. The main event match of the card was contested under the Hell in a Cell stipulation.

During WrestleMania Backlash on May 16, 2021, it was announced that the 13th Hell in a Cell event would be held on June 20, 2021, and feature wrestlers from the Raw and SmackDown brand divisions. This marked the first time for the event to be held in June and only the second time for it to not be held in October, after the 2018 event, which was held in September. The event's date was planned for Money in the Bank after it had switched dates with WrestleMania Backlash, with Money in the Bank subsequently moved to July 18.

==== Impact of the COVID-19 pandemic ====
As a result of the COVID-19 pandemic that began affecting the industry in mid-March 2020, WWE had to present the majority of its programming from a behind closed doors set. Initially, Raw and SmackDown's shows were done at the WWE Performance Center in Orlando, Florida. A limited number of Performance Center trainees and friends and family members of the wrestlers were later utilized to serve as the live audience. In late August, these programs were moved to a bio-secure bubble called the WWE ThunderDome. The select live audience was no longer utilized as the bubble allowed fans to attend the events virtually for free and be seen on the nearly 1,000 LED boards within the arena. Additionally, the ThunderDome utilized various special effects to further enhance wrestlers' entrances, and arena audio was mixed with that of the chants from the virtual fans. After being hosted at Orlando's Amway Center and Tropicana Field in St. Petersburg, Florida, the ThunderDome was relocated to the Yuengling Center in Tampa, Florida in April 2021.

On May 21, WWE announced that they would be leaving the ThunderDome and returning to live touring in mid-July, thus Hell in a Cell was WWE's final PPV and livestreaming event to be presented from the ThunderDome, and subsequently the final such event in WWE's residency at the Yuengling Center. Additionally, the 2021 event made Hell in a Cell the only PPV and livestreaming event to be held twice in the ThunderDome, after the 2020 event was produced from its original location of Orlando's Amway Center.

=== Broadcast outlets ===
The event was broadcast on traditional PPV worldwide. It was also available to livestream on Peacock in the United States, SonyLIV in India, and the WWE Network everywhere else. This was the first Hell in a Cell event to livestream on SonyLIV and Peacock, following the shutdown of the Indian version of the WWE Network in February and the American version in April.

=== Storylines ===
The event comprised seven matches, including one on the Kickoff pre-show, that resulted from scripted storylines. Results were predetermined by WWE's writers on the Raw and SmackDown brands, while storylines were produced on WWE's weekly television shows, Monday Night Raw and Friday Night SmackDown.

At WrestleMania Backlash, Bobby Lashley defeated Drew McIntyre and Braun Strowman to retain the WWE Championship. The following night on Raw, MVP and Lashley issued an open challenge to anyone on the Raw roster except McIntyre and Strowman. Later in the main event, it was revealed that the open challenge was just to face Lashley rather than a title match. The New Day's Kofi Kingston answered the challenge and defeated Lashley thanks to McIntyre's distraction. The following week, WWE official Adam Pearce scheduled a match between McIntyre and Kingston where the winner would face Lashley for the WWE Championship at Hell in a Cell, only for it to end in a no-contest after interference from Lashley and MVP. A rematch was scheduled for the following week where if Lashley and/or MVP were at ringside or interfered in the match, Lashley would be suspended for 90 days without pay; McIntyre defeated Kingston to earn another title match against Lashley at Hell in a Cell. During the contract signing on the June 7 episode, the match was made a Hell in a Cell match with a further stipulation that this would be McIntyre's last chance at the WWE Championship for as long as Lashley was champion.

At WrestleMania Backlash, Rhea Ripley defeated Charlotte Flair and Asuka to retain the Raw Women's Championship. The following night on Raw, Flair confronted WWE officials Adam Pearce and Sonya Deville, demanding another opportunity at Ripley for the championship as Flair did not take the pin in the triple threat match. Pearce and Deville stated that if Flair won her match against Asuka, they would consider it. However, Flair lost the match thanks to a distraction from Ripley. The following week, however, Flair defeated Asuka. A match between Ripley and Flair for the title was then scheduled for Hell in a Cell.

At WrestleMania Backlash, Bianca Belair defeated Bayley to retain the SmackDown Women's Championship. On the following SmackDown, WWE official Sonya Deville hosted a parade of champions to celebrate SmackDown's champions. Bayley interrupted, taking issue that she was not acknowledged as the longest-reigning SmackDown Women's Champion and claimed that Belair had cheated at Backlash by using her hair as a weapon. On the June 4 episode, Belair challenged Bayley to a rematch at Hell in a Cell with the title on the line, and Bayley accepted. Two weeks later, Belair changed the stipulation of their match to a Hell in a Cell match.

During Night 1 of WrestleMania 37, Cesaro defeated Seth Rollins. On the following SmackDown, Rollins interfered and attacked Cesaro during the latter's match, with Rollins proclaiming that their rivalry was not over. Cesaro defeated Rollins in a rematch on the May 7 episode, which also earned himself a Universal Championship match against Roman Reigns at WrestleMania Backlash, which Cesaro lost. Following the title match, Rollins came out and brutally attacked Cesaro, smashing his arm in a steel chair. On the following SmackDown, Cesaro attempted to challenge Reigns to a rematch for the title only for Rollins to attack Cesaro once again, this time resulting in Cesaro being taken out on a stretcher. On the June 18 episode, following more weeks of feuding, another match between Cesaro and Rollins was scheduled for Hell in a Cell.

During Night 2 of WrestleMania 37, Kevin Owens defeated Sami Zayn, who was accompanied by YouTube personality Logan Paul. On the following SmackDown, Zayn claimed that he lost to Owens because he was distracted wondering if Paul was okay. Zayn then called out Owens for a rematch. Owens defeated Zayn by count-out after Zayn retreated from the ring, after which, Owens brought Zayn back to the ring and performed a Stunner on him. Zayn would continue to be a hindrance to Owens over the next several weeks, and another match between the two was scheduled for Hell in a Cell.

On the May 17 episode of Raw, Nia Jax and Shayna Baszler lost their WWE Women's Tag Team Championship match after Alexa Bliss set off flames that blinded Reginald. After Jax and Baszler again lost the following week due to the flames, it was announced that Baszler would take on Reginald in an intergender match on the May 31 episode, which Reginald won when flames shot from the ring post. On the June 7 episode, Baszler was a guest on "Alexa's Playground". She stomped on Bliss's doll, Lilly, but when flames shot up from the ring posts, Baszler retreated and locked herself in a room, only to see Lilly's reflection in a mirror before the lights turned off as the show ended. The following week, Jax said Bliss would face Baszler at Hell in a Cell.

==== Canceled and rescheduled match ====
On the June 4 episode of SmackDown, The Usos (Jey Uso and Jimmy Uso) challenged Rey Mysterio and Dominik Mysterio for the SmackDown Tag Team Championship, however, the match ended in a controversial finish in which the referee did not notice that Jimmy had his shoulder up during the pin. The Usos were granted a rematch later that same night, but during the rematch, The Usos's cousin and Universal Champion, Roman Reigns, interfered by attacking the Mysterios, not wanting The Usos to embarrass themselves again. Following the match, Reigns brutally attacked Rey's son Dominik, which Jimmy felt Reigns took too far, also furthering tensions between Reigns and Jimmy. The following week, Rey confronted Reigns and challenged him to a Hell in a Cell match, wanting to take revenge on Reigns for what he did to Dominik, and a brawl ensued. The next day on Talking Smack, Reigns's special counsel Paul Heyman accepted Rey's challenge on Reigns's behalf with the Universal Championship on the line. On June 17, however, Rey posted to Twitter, stating that he did not want to wait until Sunday, and it was announced that the match would instead take place on the June 18 episode of SmackDown, marking the first Hell in a Cell match to take place on an episode of SmackDown; Reigns defeated Rey in 16 minutes to retain the title.

== Event ==
Other on-screen personnel
Role:	Name:
English commentators	Michael Cole (SmackDown)
English commentators	Pat McAfee (SmackDown)
English commentators	Jimmy Smith (Raw)
English commentators	Corey Graves (Raw)
English commentators	Byron Saxton (Raw)
Spanish commentators	Carlos Cabrera
Spanish commentators	Marcelo Rodriguez
Ring announcers	Greg Hamilton (SmackDown)
Ring announcers	Mike Rome (Raw)
Referees	Danilo Anfibio
Referees	Jason Ayers
Referees	Shawn Bennett
Referees	Jessika Carr
Referees	Darrick Moore
Referees	Eddie Orengo
Referees	Chad Patton
Interviewers	Sarah Schreiber
Interviewers	Megan Morant
Pre-show panel	Kayla Braxton
Pre-show panel	John "Bradshaw" Layfield
Pre-show panel	Peter Rosenberg
Pre-show panel	Jerry Lawler
Pre-show panel	Sonya Deville

=== Pre-show ===
During the Hell in a Cell Kickoff pre-show, one-half of the WWE Women's Tag Team Champions, Natalya (accompanied by her tag team partner, Tamina), faced Mandy Rose (accompanied by Dana Brooke). In the end, Natalya forced Rose to submit to the Sharpshooter to win the match.

=== Preliminary matches ===
The actual event opened with Bianca Belair defending the SmackDown Women's Championship against Bayley in a Hell in a Cell match. During the early half of the match, as Belair attacked Bayley with her ponytail, Bayley blocked the attacks with a chair. Later, Bayley tied Belair's ponytail on the bottom ring rope and as Bayley attempted to attack Belair, Bayley tripped and fell onto the steel steps. Bayley would also bite the arm of Belair. In the end, Belair performed the Kiss of Death on Bayley on a ladder to retain the title.

Next, Seth Rollins faced Cesaro. During Cesaro's entrance, Rollins attacked Cesaro from behind and a brawl ensued in the ring where the match officially began. In the end, as Cesaro attempted a Cesaro Swing on Rollins, Rollins performed a roll-up on Cesaro to win the match.

After that, Alexa Bliss faced Shayna Baszler (accompanied by Nia Jax and Reginald). In the closing moments, Bliss hypnotized Jax into slapping Reginald, which distracted Baszler. Bliss took advantage and performed Twisted Bliss on Baszler to win the match.

In the next match, Sami Zayn faced Kevin Owens. Throughout the match, Zayn began to target Owens' left arm. In the end, Zayn performed a running knee to the back of Owens' head and a Helluva Kick on Owens to win the match.

In the penultimate match, Rhea Ripley defended the Raw Women's Championship against Charlotte Flair. Before the match began, while the referee was raising the title to hype the match, Flair snatched the title from the referee, taunted Ripley by throwing the title at her and attacked Ripley. The climax brought the match outside the ring where Flair tried to attack Ripley by the announce table, however, Ripley grabbed the top cover of the announce table, pulled it off, and slammed it into Flair's head. Ripley was disqualified, thus Flair won the match but did not win the title as titles do not change hands on a disqualification unless stipulated.

=== Main event ===
In the main event, Bobby Lashley (accompanied by MVP) defended the WWE Championship against Drew McIntyre in a Last Chance Hell in a Cell match. Midway through the match, the referee was knocked out. McIntyre called for the referee guarding the cell door on the outside of the cage to take over and officiate the match. MVP used the opportunity to get inside the cage when the referee opened the cell door. After more fighting, McIntyre set up for the Claymore Kick, but MVP held his leg to prevent him from attacking Lashley. As McIntyre tried freeing himself from MVP's grip, Lashley rolled up McIntyre with a roll-up to win and retain the title. As per the stipulation, McIntyre could no longer challenge for the WWE Championship for the rest of Lashley's tenure as champion.

== Reception ==
Hell in a Cell 2021 received mixed reviews from fans and critics, with criticism for the Alexa Bliss vs. Shayna Bazler match in particular. Christopher Jeter of Fansided wrote, "This attempt to make the audience believe that Bliss is so frightening that even Shayna Baszler is flustered by her was bad enough when fans had to sit through that Alexa's Playground segment a couple of weeks ago on Raw. Now, they had to endure Bliss literally laughing off Baszler's offense — including the arm stomp that used to write wrestlers off of TV in NXT — and, sigh, Alexa hypnotizing Baszler and Nia Jax. If nothing else, Bliss pinning Baszler clean should signal the end of this nonsense, or at least Baszler's involvement in it".

Anthony Mango of Bleacher Report wrote, "One of the most laughably bad things on WWE television recently was the setup for the feud between Alexa Bliss and Shayna Baszler. Considering how awful most things have been lately, it says a lot that this stuff with Lilly the puppet was a standout bad storyline. At least this would be WWE's last chance to play around with the ThunderDome special effects and go out with a bang, right? Unfortunately, that wasn't the case. Nothing that happened here couldn't have happened in any other environment. The only interesting moment was Bliss hypnotizing Nia Jax and forcing her to slap Reginald, but that wasn't good enough to save this segment. This could have had some interesting special effects, gone in an interesting direction or even seen the return of Bray Wyatt. However, if you were to describe this to someone, you'd be left wondering what to say other than "Bliss pinned Baszler."".

The DQ ending to the Raw Women's Championship match was also not liked. Mango praised the match, but said that 'the ending wasn't quite as fantastic'. He added, "Disqualifications shouldn't happen on pay-per-views. There are far too many on television as it is, and the special events should be an exception to that booking where there is more finality to everything".

Dave Meltzer of the Wrestling Observer Newsletter rated the main event 4 stars, the highest-rated match on the show. Charlotte Flair vs. Rhea Ripley was rated 3.25 stars, Bayley vs. Belair was rated 3.5 stars (same as for Cesaro vs. Rollins), Zayn vs. Owens was rated 3.75 stars, Natalya vs. Mandy Rose on the kickoff show was rated 3 stars and Bliss vs. Baszler received a poor rating of 1 star, the lowest on the show. Additionally, Elton Jones of Heavy Sports of named the Lashley vs. McIntyre Hell in a Cell match the match of the night with a rating of 4 stars out of 5 and gave the whole show a good rating of 7.5 out of 10.

== Aftermath ==
=== Raw ===
On the following episode of Raw, Bobby Lashley gloated about not having to defend the WWE Championship against Drew McIntyre ever again. The New Day's Kofi Kingston, who had defeated Lashley in a non-title match on the May 17 episode of Raw and also stated that he never received a rematch after losing the WWE Championship in October 2019 at SmackDown's 20th Anniversary, came out and challenged Lashley for the title at Money in the Bank. Lashley accepted, but said he wanted to face Kingston's New Day partner, Xavier Woods, later that night. This led to Lashley competing in a Hell in a Cell match for the second straight night, where he defeated Woods. Afterwards, Lashley continued his attack on Woods while Kingston was forced to watch from outside the cell.

Also on the following episode of Raw, Charlotte Flair confronted Raw Women's Champion Rhea Ripley and claimed she was "proud" of Ripley and told her that she had never seen Ripley as a "strategic champion". WWE official Sonya Deville then scheduled a rematch between the two at Money in the Bank.

Qualifying matches for the men's and women's Money in the Bank ladder matches also began on the following episode of Raw. Alexa Bliss, Shayna Baszler, and Nia Jax competed in a tag team match where the two members of the winning team would be entered into the women's ladder match. Nikki Cross, who was incorporating a new superhero gimmick and a nickname of Nikki A.S.H. (short for Almost a Super Hero), teamed with Bliss and they defeated Baszler and Jax to qualify. For the men's match, Ricochet, Riddle, and John Morrison qualified while Drew McIntyre lost his qualifying match to Riddle. However, he won a last chance triple threat match the following week to earn Raw's final spot in the men's ladder match.

=== SmackDown ===
SmackDown Women's Champion Bianca Belair and Cesaro continued to feud with Bayley and Seth Rollins, respectively. On the following episode of SmackDown, Bayley and Rollins defeated Belair and Cesaro in a mixed tag team match in which Bayley pinned Belair. This led to a rematch between Belair and Bayley being scheduled for Money in the Bank as an "I Quit" match. However, on July 9, WWE announced that Bayley suffered a legitimate injury while training that would sideline her for up to nine months; this was followed by an announcement that a replacement would be named for Bayley and the title match would be a regular singles match held on the July 16 episode. Carmella was revealed as Bayley's replacement.

Seth Rollins and Cesaro were also scheduled for a rematch on the July 9 episode, which was also a qualifier match for the men's Money in the Bank ladder match. Rollins again defeated Cesaro, thus qualified for the match.

Another match between Kevin Owens and Sami Zayn was scheduled for the July 2 episode of SmackDown, this time as a Last Man Standing match, which Owens won. This was also a qualifying match for the men's Money in the Bank ladder match.

== Results ==
No.	Results	Stipulations	Times
1^{P}	Natalya (with Tamina) defeated Mandy Rose (with Dana Brooke) by submission	Singles match	9:45
2	Bianca Belair (c) defeated Bayley by pinfall	Hell in a Cell match for the WWE SmackDown Women's Championship	19:45
3	Seth Rollins defeated Cesaro by pinfall	Singles match	16:15
4	Alexa Bliss defeated Shayna Baszler (with Nia Jax and Reginald) by pinfall	Singles match	7:00
5	Sami Zayn defeated Kevin Owens by pinfall	Singles match	12:40
6	Charlotte Flair defeated Rhea Ripley (c) by disqualification	Singles match for the WWE Raw Women's Championship	14:10
7	Bobby Lashley (c) (with MVP) defeated Drew McIntyre by pinfall	Last Chance Hell in a Cell match for the WWE Championship	25:45
(c) / – the champion(s) heading into the match; P / – the match was broadcast on the pre-show
