= Hell in a Cell (2022) =

WWE premium live event

- Promotional poster featuring Cody Rhodes and the Hell in a Cell structure.
- Promotion: WWE
- Brand(s): Raw; SmackDown
- Date: June 5, 2022
- City: Rosemont, Illinois
- Venue: Allstate Arena
- Attendance: 12,834

WWE event chronology
← Previous; NXT In Your House	Next → Money in the Bank

Hell in a Cell chronology
← Previous; 2021	Next → Final

The 2022 Hell in a Cell was a professional wrestling premium live event (PLE) produced by WWE, held for wrestlers from the promotion's main roster brands, Raw and SmackDown. It was the 14th annual and final Hell in a Cell event and took place on Sunday, June 5, 2022, at the Allstate Arena in the Chicago suburb of Rosemont, Illinois. The event centered on the Hell in a Cell match, a 20-foot-high roofed steel cage that surrounds the ring and ringside area with no countouts or disqualifications and the only way to win is by pinfall or submission in the ring.

Seven matches were contested at the event. There was only one Hell in a Cell match which was the main event and was Raw's main match that saw Cody Rhodes defeat Seth "Freakin" Rollins. In other prominent matches, The Judgment Day (Edge, Damian Priest, and Rhea Ripley) defeated AJ Styles, Finn Bálor, and Liv Morgan in a six-person mixed tag team match, Bobby Lashley defeated Omos and MVP in a 2-on-1 handicap match, and in the opening bout, Bianca Belair defeated Asuka and Becky Lynch in a triple threat match to retain the Raw Women's Championship.

Hell in a Cell was discontinued in an effort to reduce some of the gimmick events so that the namesake matches could return to being the culmination of big feuds instead of something that has to be done each year because of the event. Its 2023 slot was replaced by Night of Champions. This was also WWE's last non-WrestleMania main roster PLE to solely take place on a Sunday until the all-women's event Evolution in July 2025. This was subsequently the only Hell in a Cell event to livestream on Disney+ Hotstar in Indonesia following the shutdown of its version of the WWE Network in late January, as well as the only Hell in a Cell event to be branded as a "premium live event", a term the company introduced at the start of the year to refer to its events airing on traditional pay-per-view and via WWE's livestreaming platforms.

== Production ==
=== Background ===
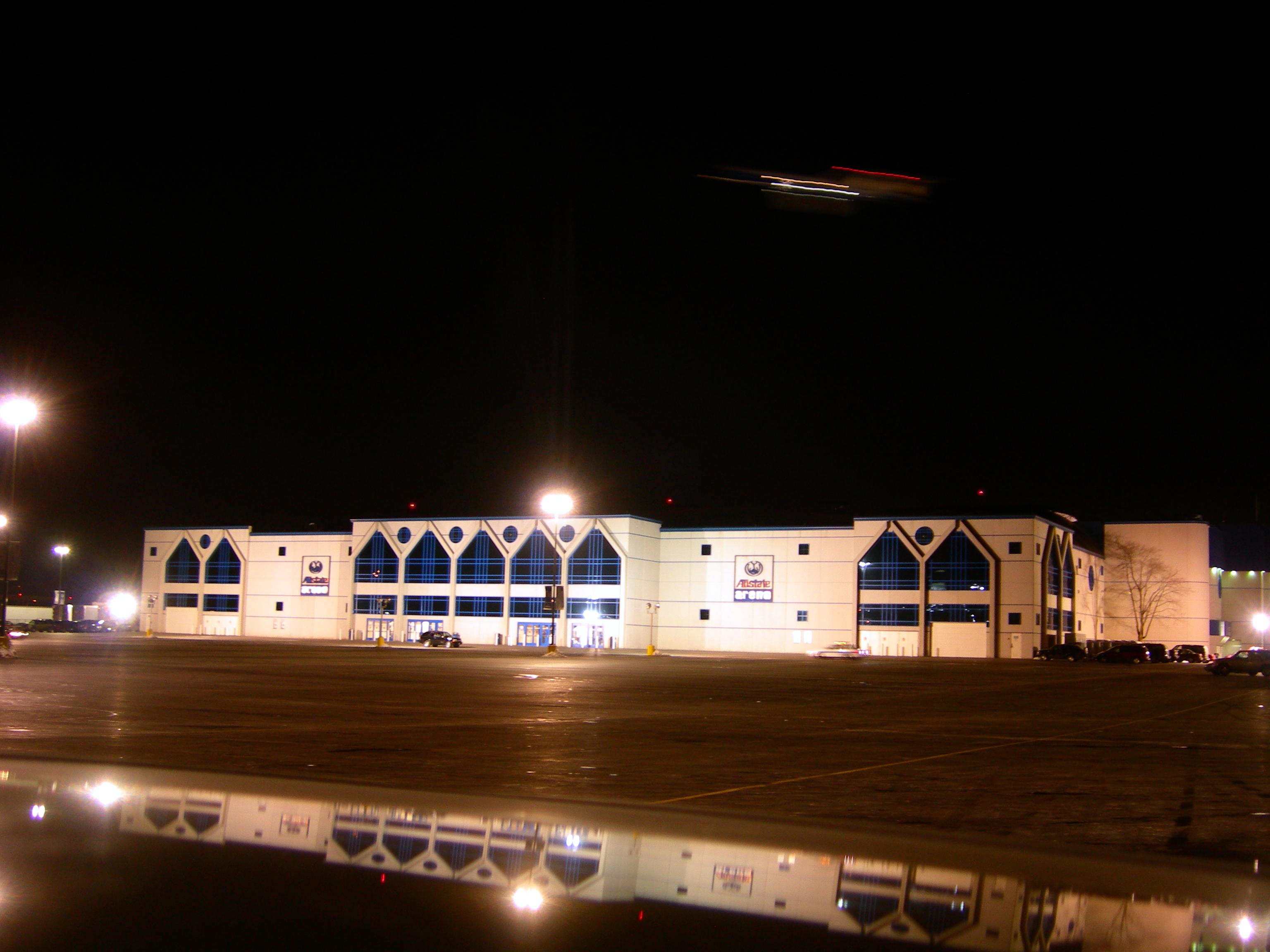
The 14th annual and final Hell in a Cell event was held at the Allstate Arena in the Chicago suburb of Rosemont, Illinois.

Hell in a Cell was an annual professional wrestling premium live event (PLE) produced by WWE since 2009, generally held in October. It was originally broadcast exclusively via pay-per-view (PPV) before it began simulcasting on WWE's livestreaming platforms in 2014. The concept of the event came from WWE's established Hell in a Cell match, in which competitors fought inside a 20-foot-high roofed cell structure surrounding the ring and ringside area. The main event match of the card was contested under the Hell in a Cell stipulation.

On October 25, 2021, WWE revealed its 2022 PLE calendar for the Raw and SmackDown brand divisions with an event slotted for Sunday, June 5, 2022, at the Allstate Arena in the Chicago suburb of Rosemont, Illinois. On March 4, 2022, that event was revealed to be the 14th Hell in a Cell event, marking the third Hell in a Cell to not be held in October, after the 2018 event in September and the 2021 event, which was the first to be held in June. This was also the first Hell in a Cell event to be branded as a "premium live event", a term the company introduced on January 1 to refer to its events that are available on PPV and via livestreaming.

=== Broadcast outlets ===
The PLE was broadcast on traditional PPV outlets worldwide. It was also available to livestream on Peacock in the United States, SonyLIV in India, Disney+ Hotstar in Indonesia, and the WWE Network everywhere else. This was the first Hell in a Cell to livestream on Disney+ Hotstar in Indonesia, following the shutdown of its version of the WWE Network in late January.

=== Storylines ===
The card included matches that resulted from scripted storylines. Results were predetermined by WWE's writers on the Raw and SmackDown brands, while storylines were produced on WWE's weekly television shows, Monday Night Raw and Friday Night SmackDown.

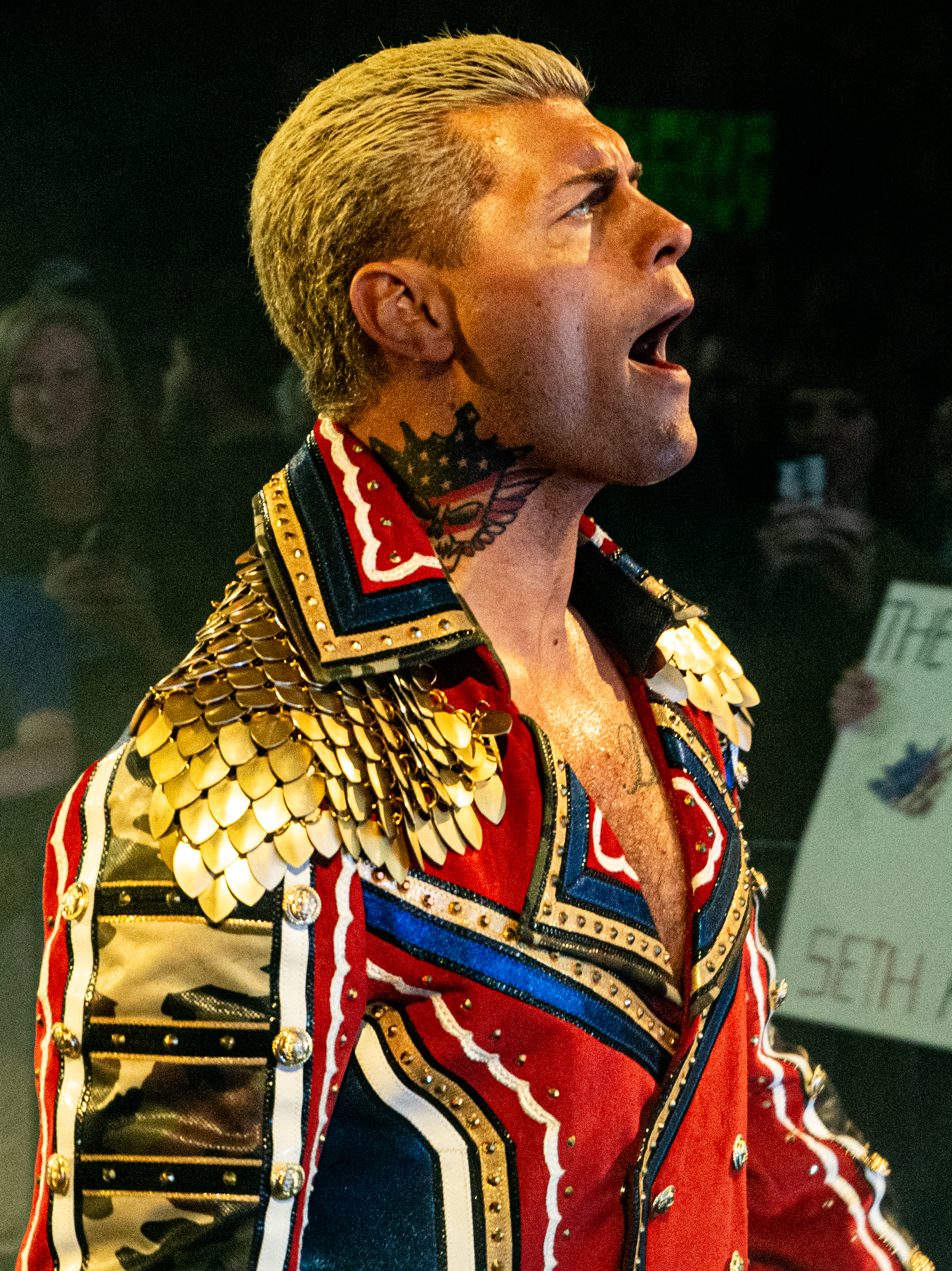
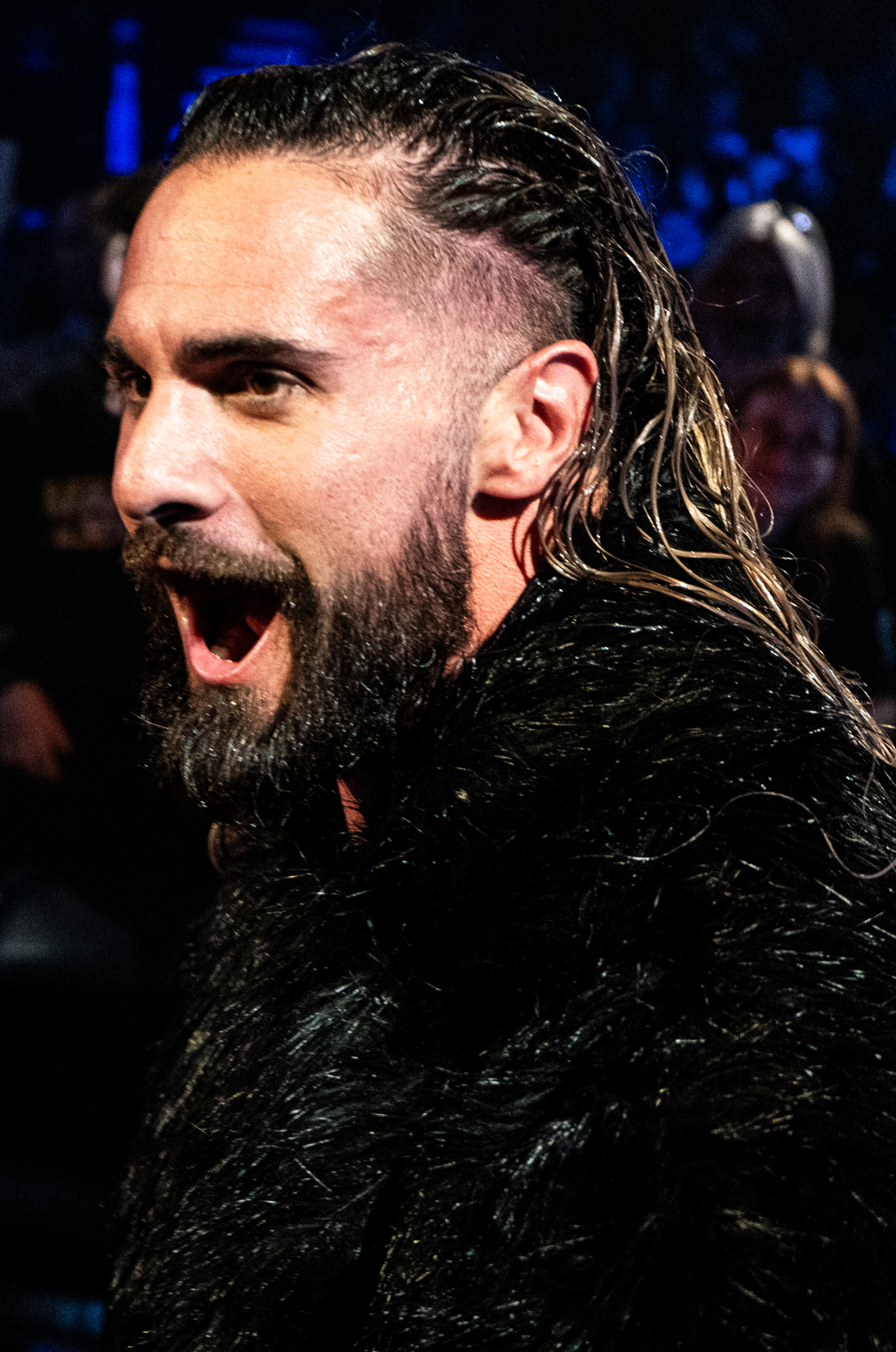
In the main event, Cody Rhodes faced Seth "Freakin" Rollins inside Hell in a Cell

After defeating Seth "Freakin" Rollins at both WrestleMania 38 and WrestleMania Backlash, Cody Rhodes was granted a United States Championship match against Theory on the May 9 episode of Raw. However, during the match, Rollins attacked Rhodes, costing Rhodes the title. The following week, Rhodes challenged Rollins to another match, this time inside Hell in a Cell, which Rollins accepted.

At Night 1 of WrestleMania 38, Bianca Belair defeated Becky Lynch to win the Raw Women's Championship. On the April 25 episode of Raw, Lynch wanted a rematch, but Asuka interrupted, making a surprise return after nine months of inactivity due to injury. WWE official Adam Pearce gave Asuka a chance to face Belair in a championship contender's match on the May 9 episode; however, the match ended in a no contest after Lynch attacked both competitors. The following week, Asuka defeated Lynch to earn the right to face Belair for the Raw Women's Championship at Hell in a Cell. (This was originally supposed to be a six-pack challenge also involving Doudrop, Nikki A.S.H., and WWE Women's Tag Team Champions Sasha Banks and Naomi, but got changed when Banks and Naomi legitimately walked out of WWE before Raw due to legitimate creative frustrations.) On the May 23 episode, Lynch was given another chance to face Asuka with the added stipulation that if Lynch won, she would be added to the championship match at Hell in a Cell. Lynch defeated Asuka, turning the bout into a triple threat match.

At Night 2 of WrestleMania 38, Bobby Lashley defeated Omos. The following night on Raw, Lashley's manager, MVP, turned on Lashley and aligned with Omos, who then defeated Lashley at WrestleMania Backlash with the help of MVP. On the May 16 episode of Raw, Lashley defeated Omos again, this time in a Steel Cage match when Omos threw Lashley through the cage, allowing him to win by walking out of the cage. The following week, with Lashley wanting to put an end to their rivalry, he challenged MVP to a match where the winner would choose the stipulation of his match against Omos at Hell in a Cell. With the help of Omos, MVP defeated Lashley by countout. Omos and MVP decided that the stipulation at Hell in a Cell would be a 2-on-1 handicap match with Omos and MVP facing Lashley.

At Night 2 of WrestleMania 38, Edge defeated AJ Styles after interference from Damian Priest. Edge and Priest would later form a faction named The Judgment Day. At WrestleMania Backlash, despite Priest being banned from ringside, Edge again defeated Styles after interference from Rhea Ripley. On the following Raw, Ripley said that she joined Judgment Day to become better, and defeated Liv Morgan. Later that night, Finn Bálor defeated Priest via disqualification after interference from Edge. Styles then attacked Edge, but Judgment Day gained the upper hand. On the May 16 episode, Morgan joined Bálor and Styles's alliance. The following week, Ripley and Priest defeated Styles and Morgan after interference from Edge. Afterwards, a brawl between the two teams broke out, with Judgment Day standing tall again. On the May 30 episode, a six-person mixed tag team match pitting Morgan, Styles, and Bálor against The Judgment Day was made official for Hell in a Cell.

On the May 30 episode of Raw, in the middle of Mustafa Ali's match, United States Champion Theory attacked Ali, causing Ali to win via disqualification and earn himself a United States Title match, where Theory easily retained. Later that night, Theory's protégé, Vince McMahon, wanted Theory to defend the title against Ali in a "fair match" at Hell in a Cell.

At Night 1 of WrestleMania 38, Madcap Moss distracted Happy Corbin, causing him to lose his match. On the following SmackDown, Corbin attacked Moss, beginning a rivalry between the two which led to a match between the two being scheduled for WrestleMania Backlash, which Moss won. On the following SmackDown, while Moss was talking about his win over Corbin at Backlash, Corbin attacked Moss, ending the attack by placing a chair on Moss's throat and slamming Moss's André the Giant Memorial Trophy on the chair. The next day on Talking Smack, it was reported that Moss suffered a (kayfabe) cervical contusion. Moss returned on the June 3 episode of SmackDown, where he lost to Corbin via disqualification after using a steel chair. Later that night, a No Holds Barred match between the two was made official for Hell in a Cell.

On the April 4 episode of Raw, while Kevin Owens was talking about his loss at Night 1 of WrestleMania 38 two days earlier, he was interrupted by Ezekiel. Over the coming weeks, Owens claimed that Ezekiel was not Elias's younger brother, but Elias himself. On the May 23 episode, after Ezekiel's match, Owens challenged Ezekiel to a match at Hell in a Cell, which was made official.

== Event ==
Other on-screen personnel
Role:	Name:
English commentators	Michael Cole (SmackDown)
English commentators	Jimmy Smith (Raw)
English commentators	Corey Graves (all matches)
English commentators	Byron Saxton (Raw)
Spanish commentators	Marcelo Rodriguez
Spanish commentators	Jerry Soto
Ring announcers	Mike Rome (Raw)
Ring announcers	Samantha Irvin (SmackDown)
Referees	Danilo Anfibio
Referees	Jason Ayers
Referees	Jessika Carr
Referees	Daphanie LaShaunn
Referees	Eddie Orengo
Referees	Ryan Tran
Referees	Rod Zapata
Pre-show panel	Kayla Braxton
Pre-show panel	Kevin Patrick
Pre-show panel	Peter Rosenberg
Pre-show panel	Booker T
Pre-show panel	Jerry Lawler

=== Preliminary matches ===
The event opened with Bianca Belair defending the Raw Women's Championship against Asuka and Becky Lynch in a triple threat match. Asuka caught Belair in an Armbar, but Belair countered and slammed her onto the top turnbuckle. Lynch performed a Natural Selection on Belair. Lynch performed a Top Rope Leg Drop on Belair, but Asuka broke up the pin. Belair slammed Asuka onto Lynch and performed a handspring into a Standing Moonsault onto both for a nearfall. Asuka performed a Codebreaker on Belair and then caught Lynch off the ropes into another Codebreaker for a nearfall on both. Asuka placed both in a Double Ankle Lock, but both made it to the ropes. Lynch performed a Manhandle Slam on Belair, but Asuka broke up the pin. In the end, Lynch threw Belair out of the ring and performed a second Manhandle Slam on Asuka. Belair returned to throw Lynch out of the ring and pinned Asuka to retain the title.

Next, Bobby Lashley took on Omos and MVP in a 2-on-1 handicap match. In the climax, MVP drove Lashley out of the ring with the Player's Boot. Omos tackled Lashley through the barricade, but Lashley made it back into the ring at nine. Cedric Alexander came out and entered the ring, but was thrown out by Omos. That distraction from Alexander allowed Lashley to perform a Spear on Omos and force MVP to submit to the Hurt Lock to win the match.

Then, Ezekiel took on Kevin Owens. Owens performed a Tornado DDT for a nearfall. Owens went for a Swanton, but Ezekiel got his knees up. Owens performed a Pop-Up Powerbomb for a nearfall. Ezekiel went up top, but Owens crotched him on the ropes. Owens knocked Ezekiel off the ropes and then performed a Cannonball in the corner. Owens performed a Stunner on Ezekiel to win the match.

In the fourth match, AJ Styles, Finn Bálor, and Liv Morgan took on The Judgment Day (Edge, Damian Priest, and Rhea Ripley) in a six-person mixed tag team match. The two teams brawled in the ring to start. Judgment Day spent most of the match neutralizing Bálor from his teammates. Styles eventually tagged in and performed a Phenomenal Forearm on Edge, but Priest pulled Styles out of the ring on the pin. Ripley attempted the Riptide, but Morgan reversed and performed a DDT. Bálor attempted the Coup de Grâce on Priest, but Ripley crotched Bálor on the top rope. Priest performed a South of Heaven Chokeslam on Bálor, but was caught with a Phenomenal Forearm from Styles. Edge threw Styles into the ring post as Bálor again attempted the Coup de Grâce, but Ripley stepped in to stop it. After Morgan took out Ripley, Bálor missed the Coup de Grâce as Edge moved and then performed a Spear on Bálor to win the match for The Judgment Day.

Next, Madcap Moss took on Happy Corbin in a No Holds Barred match. This was the only match from SmackDown that was contested at the event. Corbin beat Moss down with a steel chair, but Moss took control and returned the favor. Moss performed a DDT to Corbin for a nearfall. On the outside, Corbin ran and performed a Chop Block on Moss. Corbin placed the chair around Moss' neck and slammed him into the announce table. Moss performed a Fallaway Slam on Corbin into steel steps that was set up in the corner and then performed the Punchline. Moss placed Corbin's neck in a steel chair and slammed the steps onto the chair and pinned Corbin to win the match.

In the penultimate match, Theory defended the United States Championship against Mustafa Ali. Ali went for a 450 splash, but Theory rolled out of the way and Ali hurt his knee. Theory chop blocked the bad knee and performed A-Town Down on Ali to retain the title.

=== Main event ===
The main event saw Cody Rhodes take on Seth "Freakin" Rollins in a Hell in a Cell match. Rollins came out in polka dot themed attire to mock Rhodes' father, Dusty, while Rhodes competed in the match with a completely torn pectoral muscle. Rhodes performed a Disaster Kick and the Cody Cutter on Rollins early. Rhodes applied the Figure-Four Leglock on Rollins, but let go after Rollins struck him in the pec with a kendo stick. Rollins threw Rhodes into the cell wall multiple times with the injured shoulder. Rollins attacked the injured shoulder using the steel steps. Rollins pulled out a polka dot weight belt to lash Rhodes in the injured shoulder. Rollins attempted a Frog Splash, but Rhodes moved and Rollins crashed through a table. Rhodes pulled a bull rope out from under the ring and both he and Seth attached themselves to it. Rhodes struck Rollins in the head with a cowbell for a nearfall. Rollins used the rope to slam Rhodes' shoulder first into the ring post. Rhodes executed a Cross Rhodes on Rollins for a nearfall. Rollins performed a Buckle Bomb to Rhodes through a table for a nearfall. Rollins pulled a sledgehammer out from beneath the ring, but Rhodes was able to avoid being hit. Rhodes landed a Pedigree on Rollins for a nearfall. Rollins performed his own Cross Rhodes on Rhodes, but Rhodes was able to perform his own. Rollins then performed The Stomp for a nearfall. Rhodes performed the Cross Rhodes twice on Rollins before hitting the latter with the sledgehammer to win the match.

== Reception ==
The event was met with positive reviews from critics while the main event received universal acclaim. Rhodes and Rollins were praised for their performances, particularly Rhodes for competing inside despite a legitimately torn pectoral muscle. The main event would then be crowned WWE's and Pro Wrestling Illustrated's Match of the Year for 2022.

It was reported by WWE on Twitter that the event was the most-watched Hell in a Cell in WWE history. Dave Meltzer of the Wrestling Observer Newsletter rated the main event five stars. It was also the first time a Hell in a Cell match received a five star rating since the inaugural Hell in a Cell match.

== Aftermath ==
The 2022 Hell in a Cell would be the final Hell in a Cell event produced, as in 2023, WWE officially discontinued the event. This was due to WWE Chief Content Officer Paul "Triple H" Levesque wanting to discontinue some of the gimmick events like Hell in a Cell so that the match itself could return to being the culmination of big feuds instead of something that has to be done each year because of the event. Its 2023 slot was initially replaced by what was to be a revival of King of the Ring, rebranded as "King and Queen of the Ring", but that was changed to Night of Champions, in turn reviving Night of Champions (King and Queen of the Ring would instead happen in 2024).

=== Raw ===
Cody Rhodes opened the following night's episode of Raw and said that he was finally done with Seth "Freakin" Rollins. Despite having an appointment to have surgery for his torn pectoral muscle that Thursday, he hinted at winning the Money in the Bank ladder match at the upcoming Money in the Bank event. Rollins then interrupted and said that he still did not like Rhodes, but Rhodes earned his respect. Rollins left the ring, but while Rhodes was making his exit, Rollins attacked Rhodes from behind with a sledgehammer and continued to attack Rhodes until separated by referees and WWE officials. Rhodes then returned at the Royal Rumble on January 28, 2023, where he won the men's Royal Rumble match to earn an Undisputed WWE Universal Championship match at WrestleMania 39 against Roman Reigns.

Also on Raw, The Judgment Day (Edge, Damian Priest, and Rhea Ripley) boasted about their victory over AJ Styles, Finn Bálor, and Liv Morgan. Ripley said they were destined for victory and that she would win the fatal four-way match that night, also involving Morgan, and go on to Money in the Bank to win the Raw Women's Championship. Edge said they would be adding a new member to the group, who was revealed as Bálor. Bálor said he was tired of being someone he did not want to be and saw The Judgment Day as a way to advance his own career. Bálor, along with Priest and Ripley, then turned on Edge and attacked him, leaving him laying with a con-chair-to. Later that night, Ripley won the fatal four-way match by pinning Doudrop to face Bianca Belair for the Raw Women's Championship at Money in the Bank.

Ezekiel admitted that he came up short in his match against Kevin Owens. He then challenged Owens to a rematch the following week. Owens agreed only if Ezekiel admitted that he was actually Elias. Ezekiel did and, after Owens agreed to the match, then revealed he was lying before attacking Owens. The following week, Owens lost via countout after he proclaimed on the announcer's table that Ezekiel was Elias. Afterwards, Ezekiel stated that on the June 20 episode, his older brother, Elias, would be coming to Raw for a special concert. On that episode, Elias and Ezekiel "reunited" in a doctored backstage segment. Later that night, Elias had his concert, which was interrupted by Owens. He challenged either one of the two to a match. On the August 8 episode, Owens stretchered Ezekiel out of the arena after performing an Apron Powerbomb on him, thus ending their feud. This would be the final appearance of the Ezekiel character in WWE, as he would go back to performing under the Elias gimmick afterwards.

Asuka and Becky Lynch would continue their feud over the next few weeks. On the following Raw, Asuka caused Lynch to lose her 24/7 Championship match. Asuka attacked Lynch again the following week. On the June 20 episode, Asuka defeated Lynch to qualify for the women's Money in the Bank ladder match, while Lynch won a last chance elimination match the following week to qualify for the match. However, they failed to win the match. Their rivalry ended on the July 4 episode of Raw with Lynch defeating Asuka in a No Holds Barred match. Lynch was then scheduled to face Bianca Belair for the Raw Women's Championship at SummerSlam.

=== SmackDown ===
Another match between Happy Corbin and Madcap Moss was announced for the June 17 episode of SmackDown, this time as a "Last Laugh" match, which was won by Moss, thus ending their feud.

== Results ==
No.	Results	Stipulations	Times
1	Bianca Belair (c) defeated Asuka and Becky Lynch by pinfall	Triple threat match for the WWE Raw Women's Championship	18:55
2	Bobby Lashley defeated Omos and MVP by submission	2-on-1 Handicap match	8:25
3	Kevin Owens defeated Ezekiel by pinfall	Singles match	9:20
4	The Judgment Day (Edge, Damian Priest, and Rhea Ripley) defeated AJ Styles, Finn Bálor, and Liv Morgan by pinfall	Six-person mixed tag team match	16:00
5	Madcap Moss defeated Happy Corbin by pinfall	No Holds Barred match	12:05
6	Theory (c) defeated Mustafa Ali by pinfall	Singles match for the WWE United States Championship	10:25
7	Cody Rhodes defeated Seth "Freakin" Rollins by pinfall	Hell in a Cell match	24:20
(c) / – the champion(s) heading into the match
