= Hell in a Cell (2017) =

WWE pay-per-view and livestreaming event

- Promotional poster featuring Shane McMahon, Kevin Owens, and the Hell in a Cell structure.
- Promotion: WWE
- Brand: SmackDown
- Date: October 8, 2017
- City: Detroit, Michigan
- Venue: Little Caesars Arena
- Attendance: 16,206

WWE event chronology
← Previous; No Mercy	Next → TLC: Tables, Ladders & Chairs

Hell in a Cell chronology
← Previous; 2016	Next → 2018

The 2017 Hell in a Cell was a professional wrestling pay-per-view (PPV) and livestreaming event produced by WWE, held exclusively for wrestlers from the promotion's main roster brand, SmackDown. It was the ninth annual Hell in a Cell event and took place on October 8, 2017, at Little Caesars Arena in Detroit, Michigan. The event centered on the Hell in a Cell match, a 20-foot-high roofed steel cage that surrounds the ring and ringside area with no countouts or disqualifications and the only way to win is by pinfall or submission in the ring.

Eight matches were contested at the event, including one on the Kickoff pre-show. There were two Hell in a Cell matches, including the main event in which Kevin Owens defeated Shane McMahon with an added stipulation of falls count anywhere. In the other Hell in a Cell match, which was the opening bout, The Usos (Jey Uso and Jimmy Uso) defeated The New Day (Big E and Xavier Woods) to become record three-time SmackDown Tag Team Champions, which was the first time that a WWE tag team championship was defended in the titular structure. Other prominent matches included Jinder Mahal retaining the WWE Championship against Shinsuke Nakamura, and in an impromptu triple threat match, Baron Corbin defeated defending champion AJ Styles and Tye Dillinger to win the United States Championship. The event was also notable for Bobby Roode's main roster PPV and livestreaming event debut where he defeated Dolph Ziggler.

This was the first WWE event held at Little Caesars Arena, which opened the previous month; WWE's prior events in Detroit were primarily held at Joe Louis Arena before its closure just three months before the event in July. This was also the final brand-exclusive Hell in a Cell event, as although the 2018 event was originally planned to again be held for SmackDown, brand-exclusive PPV and livestreaming events for the main roster were discontinued following WrestleMania 34 in April that year.

== Production ==
=== Background ===
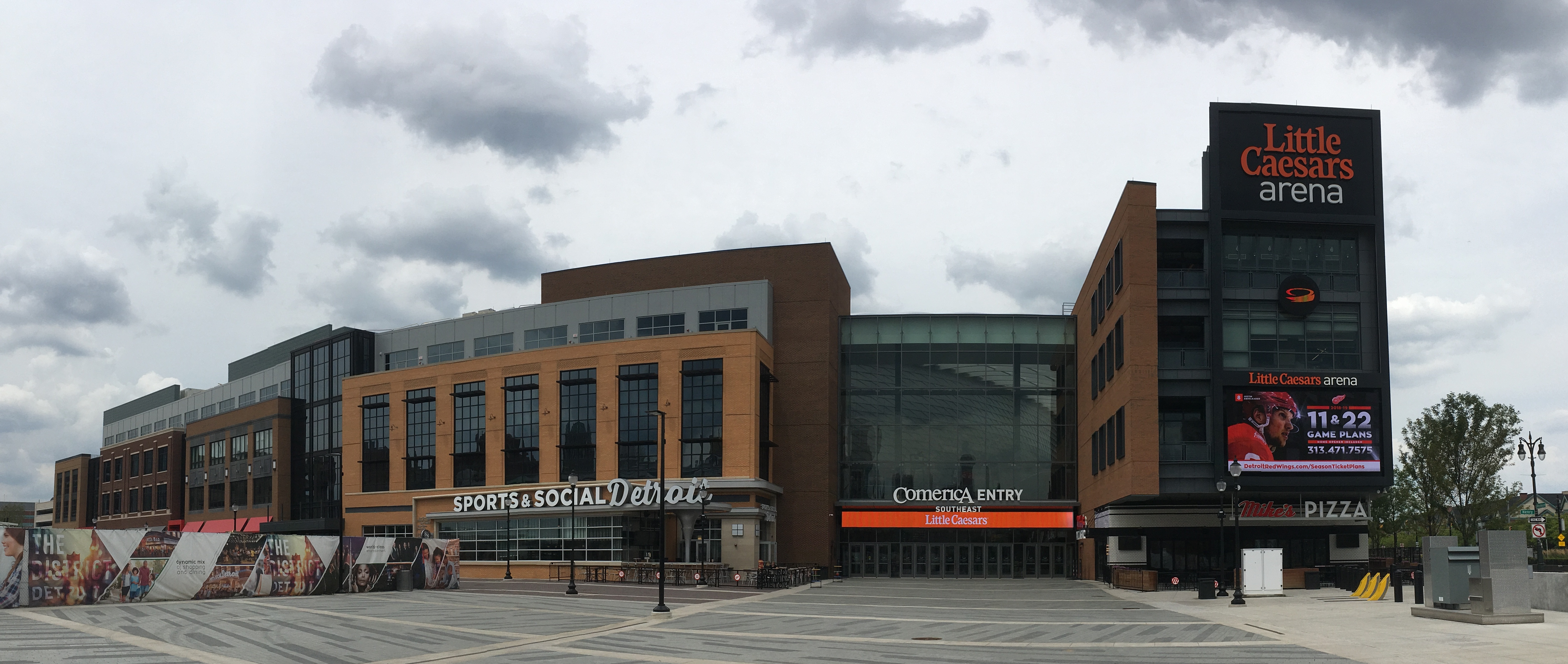
The ninth annual Hell in a Cell event was held at Little Caesars Arena in Detroit, Michigan, which was WWE's first event held at the venue.

Hell in a Cell was an annual professional wrestling event produced every October by WWE since 2009. It was originally broadcast exclusively via pay-per-view (PPV) before it began simultaneously livestreaming on the WWE Network in 2014. The concept of the event came from WWE's established Hell in a Cell match, in which competitors fought inside a 20-foot-high roofed cell structure surrounding the ring and ringside area. The main event match of the card was contested under the Hell in a Cell stipulation. Announced on July 29, 2017, the ninth Hell in a Cell event was scheduled to be held on October 8, 2017, at Little Caesars Arena in Detroit, Michigan, which was WWE's first event at the venue that opened the prior month; WWE's prior events in Detroit were primarily held at Joe Louis Arena before its closure in July that year. While the 2016 event exclusively featured wrestlers from the Raw brand, the 2017 event was SmackDown-exclusive. Tickets went on sale on August 4 through Ticketmaster.

=== Storylines ===
The event comprised eight matches, including one on the Kickoff pre-show, that resulted from scripted storylines. Results were predetermined by WWE's writers on the SmackDown brand, while storylines were produced on WWE's weekly television show, SmackDown Live.

At SummerSlam, Commissioner Shane McMahon was the special guest referee for the United States Championship match between Kevin Owens and AJ Styles. During the match, Owens attempted a pin, but Shane saw that Styles' foot was on the bottom rope and ordered the match to continue. A frustrated Owens shoved Shane, who shoved back, allowing Styles to defeat Owens to retain the title. On the following SmackDown, Shane gave Owens one final shot at the title as long as Styles was the champion and also allowed him to pick the referee for the match; Owens chose Baron Corbin. During the match, Shane took over referee duties after Corbin walked out on the match. Styles took advantage and defeated Owens to retain the championship again. Two weeks later, Shane attacked Owens after warning him not to talk about his children. Subsequently, Shane was suspended indefinitely on orders of his father, WWE Chairman Vince McMahon. The following week, Vince called out Owens, reinstated Shane, and scheduled a Hell in a Cell match between the two at Hell in a Cell. Owens agreed on the condition that Vince would allow him to beat a McMahon senseless if provoked. After agreeing and shaking hands, Owens attacked Vince with a headbutt, a superkick, and a frog splash. Vince refused to be carried out on a stretcher and walked out of the ring, helped by his daughter Stephanie McMahon (her first cable television appearance since WrestleMania 33). The following week, Shane threatened that he would give Owens a beating at Hell in a Cell and warned him of his actions. The same night, Owens, via satellite, apologized for attacking Vince, but blamed Shane for his actions. On the September 26 episode, Owens called out Shane, but was confronted by Sami Zayn, who said that Owens went too far. As the two were about to fight, they were stopped by General Manager Daniel Bryan, who scheduled a match between the two. Owens defeated Zayn by referee stoppage after performing a powerbomb onto the ring apron. After the match, Owens attacked Zayn, but Shane appeared. As he attempted to go after Owens, Owens threw Zayn into Shane and fled through the crowd. The following week, Shane changed their match to a falls count anywhere Hell in a Cell match. He called out Owens to no avail, but midway through his promo, Owens appeared in the crowd. Owens began to leave and Shane chased after him through the crowd, where they fought in the concession area and Owens attacked Shane with a powerbomb through a table. Owens returned to the ring to cut a promo, but Shane returned and fought with Owens, which ended with Owens attacking Shane with a super kick and a pop up powerbomb.

At SummerSlam, Jinder Mahal defeated Shinsuke Nakamura to retain the WWE Championship due to a distraction from The Singh Brothers (Samir Singh and Sunil Singh). On the following episode of SmackDown, as retribution for The Singh Brothers costing Nakamura his WWE Championship match, General Manager Daniel Bryan scheduled Nakamura to face The Singh Brothers in a handicap match that Nakamura won. Afterwards, Mahal attacked Nakamura, but Nakamura countered with the Kinshasa. On the August 29 episode, Nakamura and Randy Orton defeated Mahal and Rusev. After the match, Orton attacked Nakamura with an RKO. A number one contendership match between Nakamura and Orton was scheduled for the following week, in which Nakamura defeated Orton to face Mahal for the WWE Championship at Hell in a Cell. The next two weeks, Mahal and The Singh Brothers made fun of Nakamura and mocked his facial expressions and signature poses. Nakamura responded that there would be no jokes when he wins the WWE Championship at Hell in a Cell. The following week, Mahal apologized to Nakamura, but continued to make fun of him, prompting Nakamura to confront Mahal. Nakamura attacked the Singh Brothers, but Mahal then attacked Nakamura. Nakamura attacked the three and performed the Kinshasa on Mahal. On the final SmackDown before Hell in a Cell, Nakamura's in-ring interview with Renee Young was interrupted by The Singh Brothers. During the distraction, Mahal attacked Nakamura from behind. Nakamura attempted to fight off the three, but was overwhelmed.

On the August 29 episode of SmackDown, after finishing his feud with Kevin Owens, United States Champion AJ Styles officially reinstated the U.S. Championship Open Challenge, that was answered by Tye Dillinger. Baron Corbin also came out as he also wanted to answer the challenge, but was too late. Styles defeated Dillinger to retain the title and Corbin attacked Dillinger, who was saved by Styles. The following week, Dillinger faced Corbin with Styles on commentary. Corbin won the match with heel tactics. Afterwards backstage, Styles offered Dillinger a title match the following week and Dillinger accepted. During the match, Corbin attempted to interfere, but Styles attacked him with the Phenomenal Forearm, and then defeated Dillinger. After the match, Styles shook Dillinger's hand as a show of respect, but Corbin attacked them both and said that he would be the next challenger for the title. That match, however, did not occur as Corbin attacked Styles before the match and Dillinger attacked Corbin. The following week, Corbin had a rematch with Dillinger with Styles again on commentary. Corbin won the match by countout and declared that he would take the United States Championship. A title match between Styles and Corbin was scheduled for Hell in a Cell. On the final SmackDown before Hell in a Cell, Corbin again faced Dillinger where Dillinger defeated Corbin with a rollup pin. After the match, Styles appeared on the TitanTron. He said that Corbin does not focus enough and gets mad too easily and that was why John Cena defeated him at SummerSlam and why he lost his Money in the Bank cash-in.

At SummerSlam, The Usos (Jey Uso and Jimmy Uso) defeated The New Day (Big E and Xavier Woods with Kofi Kingston) to regain the SmackDown Tag Team Championship. Two weeks later on SmackDown, The Usos earned the right to choose the stipulation for The New Day's championship rematch by defeating New Day in a non-title match. The Usos chose a Street Fight, which occurred on the Sin City SmackDown on September 12, where The New Day defeated The Usos to regain the SmackDown Tag Team Championship. The following week, The Usos invoked their championship rematch for Hell in a Cell. On the September 26 episode, after The Usos defeated The Hype Bros (Mojo Rawley and Zack Ryder), The New Day, who were seated in the front row, said that they wanted to defend the SmackDown Tag Team Championship in a Hell in a Cell match, to which The Usos accepted.

At SummerSlam, Natalya defeated Naomi to win the SmackDown Women's Championship and retained the title in a rematch on the Sin City SmackDown on September 12. The following week, Natalya interrupted Charlotte Flair, who was commenting on her father Ric Flair's recovery from real-life medical issues. Charlotte subsequently challenged Natalya to a title match, but was interrupted by Becky Lynch, Naomi, and Tamina. General Manager Daniel Bryan then scheduled a fatal four-way match between the four to determine Natalya's challenger at Hell in a Cell, which was won by Charlotte.

For several weeks, Dolph Ziggler would come out impersonating other wrestlers' entrances, claiming that was all that the fans cared about, and that they did not care about the actual in-ring performance. He also claimed that he was the best in-ring performer in WWE. After impersonating The Undertaker's entrance on the September 26 episode, Ziggler was confronted by Bobby Roode, who had been promoted to the main roster from NXT on the August 22 episode. He complimented Ziggler's in-ring work, but asked Ziggler to prove that he was the best in a match at Hell in a Cell, to which Ziggler accepted.

At SummerSlam, Randy Orton defeated Rusev in 10 seconds. The two had a rematch on the September 19 episode where Rusev defeated Orton, also in about 10 seconds, but after Orton had already had a match with Aiden English. The following week, in celebration for Rusev defeating Orton, he was presented with the key to his hometown in Bulgaria by the town's mayor. English was on hand to sing a song for the celebration and the mayor proclaimed September 26 as "Rusev Day". Orton then appeared and gave an RKO to English, followed by one to Rusev. Another match between the two was scheduled for Hell in a Cell.

After Jason Jordan was moved to the Raw brand for being the (kayfabe) illegitimate son of Raw General Manager Kurt Angle, American Alpha, which consisted of Jordan and Chad Gable, was subsequently disbanded. On the August 22 episode of SmackDown, SmackDown General Manager Daniel Bryan apologized to Gable over the incident and introduced the returning Shelton Benjamin as Gable's new tag team partner; Benjamin last performed in WWE in 2010. The following week, the two teamed up for the first time and defeated The Ascension (Konnor and Viktor). Gable and Benjamin were then victorious over The Hype Bros (Mojo Rawley and Zack Ryder) on the September 12 episode. After the match, Rawley shook hands with Gable and Benjamin out of respect, but Ryder refused. On the October 3 episode, it was announced that Gable and Benjamin would have a rematch with The Hype Bros on the Hell in a Cell Kickoff pre-show.

== Event ==
Other on-screen personnel
Role:	Name:
English commentators	Tom Phillips
English commentators	Corey Graves
English commentators	Byron Saxton
Spanish commentators	Carlos Cabrera
Spanish commentators	Marcelo Rodríguez
German commentators	Tim Haber
German commentators	Calvin Knie
Ring announcer	Greg Hamilton
Referees	Jason Ayers
Referees	Mike Chioda
Referees	Dan Engler
Referees	Charles Robinson
Referees	Ryan Tran
Interviewers	Dasha Fuentes
Interviewers	Kayla Braxton
Pre-show panel	Renee Young
Pre-show panel	Peter Rosenberg
Pre-show panel	David Otunga
Talking Smack panel	Renee Young
Talking Smack panel	Peter Rosenberg

=== Pre-show ===
During the Hell in a Cell Kickoff pre-show, General Manager Daniel Bryan added Tye Dillinger to the United States Championship match on the main card, making it a triple threat match against champion AJ Styles and Baron Corbin.

Also during the pre-show, Chad Gable and Shelton Benjamin faced The Hype Bros (Mojo Rawley and Zack Ryder). In the end, the Hype Bros attempted the "Hype Ryder" on Benjamin, who fought out, and Ryder argued with Rawley. Gable and Benjamin took advantage and performed a blockbuster/sitout powerbomb combination on Ryder, with Gable pinning Ryder for the win.

=== Preliminary matches ===
The actual pay-per-view opened with The New Day's Big E and Xavier Woods defending the SmackDown Tag Team Championship against The Usos in a Hell in a Cell match, the first one to have the tag titles defended. In the end, The Usos performed a double Samoan Splash onto a chair on Woods to regain the titles for a record third time.

In the next match, Randy Orton faced Rusev. In the end, as Orton attempted an "RKO", Rusev countered and attempted "The Accolade", which Orton countered and executed an "RKO" on Rusev for the win.

After that, AJ Styles defended the United States Championship in a triple threat match against Baron Corbin and Tye Dillinger. After Styles performed a "Phenomenal Forearm" on Dillinger, Corbin kicked Styles out of the ring and pinned Dillinger to win the title.

Next, Natalya defended the SmackDown Women's Championship against Charlotte Flair. In the end, Natalya attacked Charlotte with a steel chair, thus Charlotte won by disqualification, however, Natalya retained the title.

Later, Jinder Mahal defended the WWE Championship against Shinsuke Nakamura. During the match, The Singh Brothers attempted to interfere, which eventually caused the referee to eject them from ringside. Nakamura performed a "Kinshasa" on Mahal, only for Mahal to grab the bottom rope to void the pinfall. As Mahal attempted to escape through the crowd, Nakamura stopped him. Mahal performed the "Khallas" on Nakamura to retain the title.

In the sixth match, Bobby Roode faced Dolph Ziggler. Ziggler had promised to have a big, elaborate entrance, however, Ziggler's music played, but was then cut off with no lights or video on the TitanTron and Ziggler entered with no music. The match ended after a series of back and forth roll-ups, with Roode scoring the win while holding Ziggler's tights. Immediately after the match, Ziggler attacked Roode with a "Zig Zag".

=== Main event ===
In the main event, Kevin Owens faced Shane McMahon in a Falls Count Anywhere Hell in a Cell match. Before Owens entered the cell, Shane attacked him. Both then entered the cage, which was locked, and Owens and Shane fought. As Owens attempted a Pop Up Powerbomb, Shane countered into a Triangle Choke, with Owens rolling out of the ring to escape. Owens performed a Powerbomb on Shane onto the steel steps for a near-fall. Owens attempted a Cannonball through a table, which was positioned against the cell, but Shane avoided, causing Owens to fall through the table. Shane performed a Coast-to-Coast on Owens, who placed his foot on the bottom rope to void the pinfall at a two count. Shane used bolt cutters to open the cell door and cleared an announce table. Owens and Shane then proceeded to climb the cell. Atop the cell, Owens performed a Pop Up Powerbomb on Shane. Owens attempted to flee by climbing down the cell, but Shane followed and fought with Owens on the side of the cell with Shane knocking Owens off, who fell through the announce table. Shane placed Owens on another announce table and attempted a "Leap of Faith" from the top of the cell, but Sami Zayn appeared and quickly pulled Owens to safety thus Shane fell through the announce table himself. Zayn then placed Owens on top of Shane for the pin, giving Owens the win and turning Zayn heel in the process.

== Reception ==
John Canton of TJR Wrestling gave the event a 7 out of 10, praising both Hell in a Cell matches for carrying the show, felt the WWE Championship and Roode/Ziggler bouts were disappointing and should have been better, and was critical of the show's 3.5 hour runtime. He concluded that: "If the non-HIAC matches were better this could have been a 9 out of 10 type show, but it's still good enough to earn a 7 out of 10 from me. That's solid. I enjoyed most of it." Ryan Dilbert of Bleacher Report also gave praise to both Hell in a Cell bouts, saying the SmackDown Tag Title opener had "an ideal blend of comedy and brutality", and felt the main event was "a livewire work of theater complete with vivid images and car-crash stunts." He added that the triple threat United States title match "flowed well and everyone got their chance to shine", the SmackDown Women's title match told a "solid story" despite the anticlimactic finish, and critiqued that the WWE Championship bout came across as "midcard filler", saying that a "few spots of excitement weren't enough to keep this from being a major disappointment." 411Mania's Larry Csonka gave the event a 6.5 out of 10, calling the New Day/Usos opener "the best overall use of the HIAC in a long time, and one of WWE's best matches of the year", felt the triple threat United States title bout was "an overall good match" despite the "overly long Corbin heatless segment" and being "slavish to the cliché triple threat formula", and critiqued that the main event had a long runtime but told a decent story with Shane's resilience and the closing angle involving Sami Zayn. Kevin Pantoja, also writing for 411Mania, praised the opening Tag Title bout as "one of the more creative Cell matches" and "the best main roster match of 2017", critiqued that the United States title match used "typical Triple Threat match tropes" and a poor finish but found it "entertaining and one of the better triple threats this year", and was positive towards the main event for having "tense moments" and an "incredibly memorable" finish. Pantoja gave the event a 7.0 out of 10, saying: "This was one of the better solo brand PPVs in a while. I'd say it was the best Smackdown one this year."

== Aftermath ==
On the following episode of SmackDown, Kevin Owens thanked Sami Zayn for helping him. Zayn explained that he was glad that he was brought to SmackDown, which had been called the "land of opportunity", but he never got an opportunity. He understood that Commissioner Shane McMahon was a busy person, and that maybe his time would come, but after Shane ignored his warning about facing Owens, he realized that Shane did not actually care about him and Shane only cared about himself and that was why he saved Owens. He said that despite their rough history, going from being best friends to bitter rivals, Owens was still his brother and he realized that Owens was right all along in his actions and thanked Owens. Shane appeared the following week and was confronted by Zayn, who said that he would take him out "in one second" if Shane wanted to compete again. Shane said they would eventually settle their score, but the focus now was Survivor Series.

New SmackDown Tag Team Champions The Usos said that they earned The New Day's respect and that they were the best two tag teams on the SmackDown roster. They were then interrupted by The Hype Bros, Chad Gable and Shelton Benjamin, Breezango (Fandango and Tyler Breeze), and The Ascension. A number one contender's fatal four-way was scheduled between the four teams to determine the next number one contenders for the tag titles, which was won by Gable and Benjamin. They challenged for the titles on the November 7 episode, but The Usos retained after getting counted out.

Backstage on the following SmackDown, SmackDown Women's Champion Natalya was confronted by Tamina, Lana, and Carmella. Charlotte Flair then appeared and attacked Natalya. Becky Lynch and Naomi joined to help Charlotte, and the brawl was broken up by referees. On the November 14 episode, after a few more weeks of feuding, Flair defeated Natalya in a rematch to win her first SmackDown Women's Championship.

Also on the following SmackDown, Shinsuke Nakamura and Randy Orton teamed up and defeated Rusev and Aiden English. WWE Champion Jinder Mahal, who claimed that he had defeated every worthy opponent on SmackDown, made an interpromotional challenge to Raw's Universal Champion Brock Lesnar for Survivor Series.

AJ Styles invoked his United States Championship rematch clause against Baron Corbin, but was unsuccessful in gaining the title back. Dolph Ziggler claimed Bobby Roode to be a fraud, as Roode pinned Ziggler by holding his tights. Roode retorted that he was the smarter one in the match. Ziggler said that he was the better wrestler and that he wanted a rematch, which occurred the following week where Ziggler defeated Roode the same way that Roode had defeated him. Roode then challenged Ziggler to a two out of three falls match for the following week, which Roode won and qualified for Team SmackDown at Survivor Series.

The 2017 Hell in a Cell event would be the final to be brand-exclusive, as although the 2018 event was originally planned to again be held for SmackDown, WWE discontinued brand-exclusive PPV and livestreaming events following WrestleMania 34 in April that year. The following year's event also moved Hell in a Cell up to September for the first and only time, as it returned to October in 2019.

== Results ==
No.	Results	Stipulations	Times
1^{P}	Chad Gable and Shelton Benjamin defeated The Hype Bros (Mojo Rawley and Zack Ryder) by pinfall	Tag team match	11:20
2	The Usos (Jey Uso and Jimmy Uso) defeated The New Day (Big E and Xavier Woods) (c) (with Kofi Kingston) by pinfall	Hell in a Cell match for the WWE SmackDown Tag Team Championship	22:00
3	Randy Orton defeated Rusev by pinfall	Singles match	11:40
4	Baron Corbin defeated AJ Styles (c) and Tye Dillinger by pinfall	Triple threat match for the WWE United States Championship	19:20
5	Charlotte Flair defeated Natalya (c) by disqualification	Singles match for the WWE SmackDown Women's Championship	12:15
6	Jinder Mahal (c) (with The Singh Brothers) defeated Shinsuke Nakamura by pinfall	Singles match for the WWE Championship	12:10
7	Bobby Roode defeated Dolph Ziggler by pinfall	Singles match	11:35
8	Kevin Owens defeated Shane McMahon by pinfall	Falls Count Anywhere Hell in a Cell match	39:00
(c) / – the champion(s) heading into the match; P / – the match was broadcast on the pre-show
