= Hell in a Cell (2010) =

World Wrestling Entertainment pay-per-view event

- Promotional poster featuring The Undertaker and the Hell in a Cell structure
- Promotion: World Wrestling Entertainment
- Brand(s): Raw; SmackDown
- Date: October 3, 2010
- City: Dallas, Texas
- Venue: American Airlines Center
- Attendance: 7,500
- Buy rate: 210,000

Pay-per-view chronology
← Previous; Night of Champions	Next → Bragging Rights

Hell in a Cell chronology
← Previous; 2009	Next → 2011

The 2010 Hell in a Cell was a professional wrestling pay-per-view (PPV) event produced by World Wrestling Entertainment (WWE). It was the second annual Hell in a Cell event and took place on October 3, 2010, at the American Airlines Center in Dallas, Texas, held for wrestlers from the promotion's Raw and SmackDown brand divisions. The event centered on the men's Hell in a Cell match, a 20-foot-high roofed steel cage that surrounds the ring and ringside area with no countouts or disqualifications and the only way to win is by pinfall or submission in the ring.

Six matches were contested at the event, including two Hell in a Cell matches. In the main event, Kane retained SmackDown's World Heavyweight Championship against The Undertaker in a Hell in a Cell match. In the other Hell in a Cell match, Randy Orton retained Raw's WWE Championship against Sheamus. Also on the card, Daniel Bryan retained Raw's United States Championship against The Miz and John Morrison in a Triple Threat Submissions Count Anywhere match, Wade Barrett defeated John Cena, and Edge defeated Jack Swagger.

This was the final Hell in a Cell event held during the first brand split, which ended in August 2011, but was reinstated in July 2016. This was also WWE's last PPV event in which the World Heavyweight Championship was in the main event until TLC: Tables, Ladders & Chairs in December 2013.

== Production ==
=== Background ===
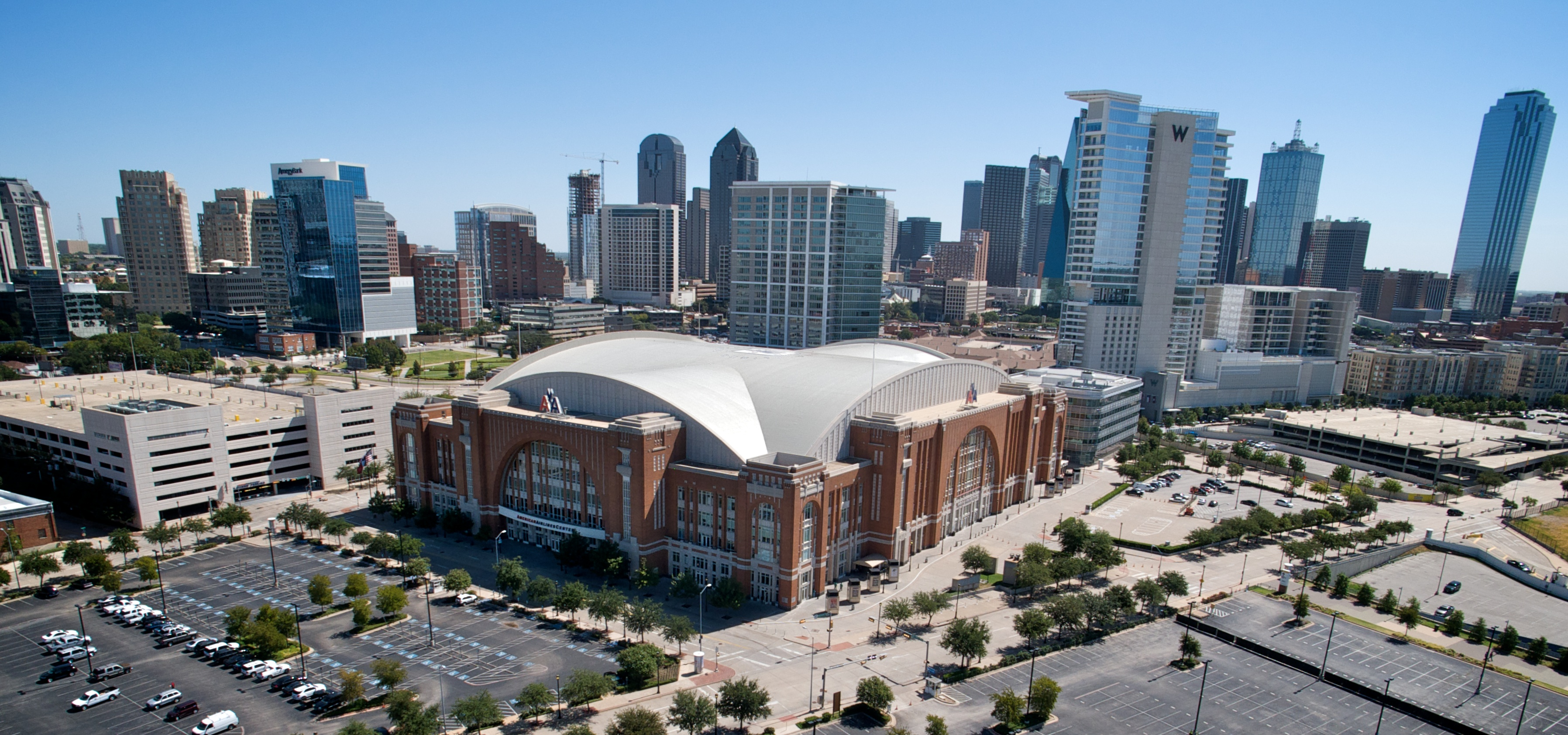
The second annual Hell in a Cell event was held at the American Airlines Center in Dallas, Texas.

In 2009, World Wrestling Entertainment (WWE) held a professional wrestling pay-per-view (PPV) event titled Hell in a Cell, which replaced the previously annual October PPV, No Mercy. The concept came from WWE's established Hell in a Cell match, in which competitors fight inside a 20-foot-high roofed cell structure surrounding the ring and ringside area. The main event match of the card was contested under the Hell in a Cell stipulation. A second Hell in a Cell event was scheduled for October 3, 2010, at the American Airlines Center in Dallas, Texas and featured wrestlers from the Raw and SmackDown brand divisions. This established Hell in a Cell as the company's new annual October PPV.

=== Storylines ===
The professional wrestling matches at Hell in a Cell featured professional wrestlers performing as characters in scripted events pre-determined by the hosting promotion, WWE. Storylines between the characters were produced on WWE's weekly television shows Raw and SmackDown with the Raw and SmackDown brands—storyline divisions in which WWE assigned its employees to different programs.

The main rivalry from the Raw brand featured the new champion Randy Orton against former champion Sheamus in a Hell in a Cell match for the WWE Championship. At Night of Champions, Orton won the championship in a six-pack challenge against Chris Jericho, Edge, John Cena, Wade Barrett and Sheamus to win the championship, following a winning streak leading up to the pay-per-view. The following night on Raw, Sheamus invoked his rematch clause for the championship. The Anonymous Raw General Manager agreed to the match, allowing it to be contested as a Hell in a Cell match.

The main rivalry from the SmackDown brand featured champion Kane against The Undertaker in a Hell in a Cell match for the World Heavyweight Championship. The storyline saw Kane attack The Undertaker to put him in a vegetative state and steal his powers, which led to Kane dominating The Undertaker upon The Undertaker's return. At Night of Champions, Kane faced The Undertaker in a No Holds Barred match for the championship, which he won. In an attempt to get rid of The Undertaker for good, Kane challenged him to a Hell in a Cell match, a match originally conceived by The Undertaker, and the match in which Kane made his debut by attacking Undertaker nearly 13 years before at Badd Blood: In Your House. A returning Paul Bearer reunited with The Undertaker on the September 24 episode of SmackDown, however, restoring his powers.

Another rivalry from Raw involved John Cena and Wade Barrett, the leader of a group of former NXT rookies known as The Nexus. Since their creation, The Nexus had assaulted several wrestlers on Raw, but focused mainly on Cena causing him to lose several championship matches. At Night of Champions, The Nexus attacked Cena which allowed Barrett to eliminate him from the six-pack challenge. The next day on Raw, both Cena and Barrett agreed to a match with the stipulation that if Barrett was to win, then Cena would be forced join The Nexus. If Cena won, however, The Nexus would be forced to disband. The Anonymous Raw General Manager added another stipulation if The Nexus interfered in the match then Barrett would lose the match.

== Event ==
Other on-screen personnel
Role:	Name:
English commentators	Michael Cole
English commentators	Jerry Lawler
English commentators	Matt Striker
Spanish commentators	Carlos Cabrera
Spanish commentators	Hugo Savinovich
Interviewer	Josh Matthews
Ring announcers	Justin Roberts
Ring announcers	Tony Chimel
Ring announcers	Ricardo Rodriguez
Referees	Mike Chioda
Referees	Charles Robinson
Referees	John Cone
Referees	Jack Doan
Referees	Darrick Moore
Referees	Chad Patton

=== Preliminary matches ===
The actual pay-per-view opened with Daniel Bryan defending the United States Championship against John Morrison and The Miz in a Submissions Count Anywhere match. In the end, atop the entrance ramp, Bryan forced Miz to submit to the Lebell Lock to retain the title.

Next, Randy Orton defended the WWE Championship against Sheamus in a Hell in a Cell match. During the match, Orton struck Sheamus with the steel steps for a near-fall. Orton performed a Snap Scoop Powerslam onto the steel steps on Sheamus for a near-fall. Sheamus performed an Irish Curse Backbreaker on top of the steel steps and a Brogue Kick on Orton for a near-fall. In the end, Orton attempted a Punt Kick outside the ring on Sheamus but Sheamus avoided, executed a second Brogue Kick on Orton and scored a near-fall. Orton performed an RKO onto the steel steps on Sheamus to retain the title.

Alberto Del Rio cut a promo on how he helped the audience by injuring Rey Mysterio and Christian. Edge interrupted Del Rio, cutting a promo on how he had been on a campaign against stupidity, with Del Rio not being part of the solution. Jack Swagger interrupted Edge, demanding retribution for Edge attacking The Swagger Soaring Eagle, Swagger's mascot. Del Rio hit Edge with a microphone and Swagger attacked Edge. The Anonymous Raw General Manager booked an impromptu match between Edge and Swagger.

Edge faced Jack Swagger in an impromptu match. During the match, Edge attempted a Spear on Swagger, who countered and performed a Gutwrench Powerbomb on Edge for a near-fall. In the end, Swagger applied the Ankle Lock on Edge but Edge touched the ropes, forcing Swagger to break the hold. Edge performed a Spear on Swagger to win the match.

Later, John Cena faced Wade Barrett. The stipulations were if Barrett won, Cena would have been forced to join The Nexus. If Cena won, The Nexus would have been forced to disband. If The Nexus interfered in the match then Barrett would have lost the match. During the match, various WWE superstars attacked The Nexus, but the referees made them disperse. As Cena attempted an Attitude Adjustment on Barrett, Barrett countered into a Wasteland on Cena for a near-fall. Cena executed an Attitude Adjustment on Barrett for a near-fall. In the climax, Cena applied the STF on Barrett but the debuting Michael McGillicutty and Husky Harris interfered; as McGillicutty distracted the referee, Harris attacked Cena with a metal object and ran away. Barrett pinned Cena to win the match, forcing Cena to join The Nexus.

In the fifth match, Michelle McCool defended the WWE Divas Championship against Natalya. In the end, Natalya applied the Sharpshooter on McCool but Layla threw her shoe into the ring, resulting in Natalya winning by disqualification.

=== Main event ===
In the main event, Kane defended the World Heavyweight Championship against The Undertaker in a Hell in a Cell match. During the match, Undertaker applied Hell's Gate on Kane but Kane rolled outside the ring to escape the hold. Undertaker performed a Chokeslam for a near-fall. Undertaker attempted a Last Ride on Kane, who countered and performed a Chokeslam on Undertaker for a near-fall. Undertaker performed a Last Ride on Kane for a near-fall. Undertaker attempted a Tombstone Piledriver on Kane, who countered and performed a Tombstone Piledriver on Undertaker for a near-fall and Kane then attacked the referee. While the medical staff were tending to the referee, Paul Bearer entered the cell, leading to Kane confronting Bearer but Undertaker performed a second Chokeslam on Kane. Undertaker attempted to perform a Tombstone Piledriver on Kane but Bearer used the urn to blind Undertaker and passed Kane the urn. Kane hit Undertaker with the urn and performed a second Chokeslam on Undertaker to retain the title.

== Reception ==
Hell in a Cell was attended by an audience of 7,500 in the American Airlines Center in Dallas, Texas. The pay-per-view drew 210,000 buys, a decrease on the 2009 event buyrate of 283,000.

== Aftermath ==
Paul Bearer issued a challenge to The Undertaker to fight Kane in a Buried Alive Match shortly after the events of Hell in a Cell. The Undertaker accepted and would taunt Kane with his pyrotechnics, as well as drag him under the ring later. At Bragging Rights, Kane defeated The Undertaker with help from The Nexus in order to close the feud.

As the newest member of The Nexus, John Cena attempted to destroy the group from the inside, until the Anonymous Raw General Manager told Cena to follow Wade Barrett's orders or lose his job. In a battle royal to determine the number one contender to the WWE Championship, Barrett and Cena made it to the final two. Barrett then forced Cena to eliminate himself, making Barrett the new number one contender. To further guarantee his success, Barrett made Cena stand in his corner at Bragging Rights in his match against Randy Orton, as well as firing Cena if Barrett lost. At Bragging Rights, Barrett defeated Orton by disqualification after Cena attacked Barrett, thus letting Cena keep his job and not letting Barrett win the WWE Championship. Also at Bragging Rights, Cena won the WWE Tag Team Championship with David Otunga.

The 2010 Hell in a Cell was the last Hell in a Cell event held under the first brand split, which ended in August 2011. However, the brand split was reinstated in July 2016, which reintroduced brand-exclusive PPVs, with that year's Hell in a Cell held exclusively for Raw. Additionally, in April 2011, the promotion ceased using its full name with the "WWE" abbreviation becoming an orphaned initialism.

== Results ==
No.	Results	Stipulations	Times
1^{D}	Goldust, Kofi Kingston, and R-Truth defeated Cody Rhodes, Drew McIntyre, and Dolph Ziggler by pinfall	Six-man tag team match	14:26
2	Daniel Bryan (c) defeated The Miz and John Morrison	Submissions Count Anywhere match for the WWE United States Championship	14:32
3	Randy Orton (c) defeated Sheamus by pinfall	Hell in a Cell match for the WWE Championship	22:51
4	Edge defeated Jack Swagger by pinfall	Singles match	11:31
5	Wade Barrett defeated John Cena by pinfall	Singles match Since Barrett won, Cena was forced to join The Nexus. Had Cena won, The Nexus would have been forced to disband. Had The Nexus interfered in the match, Barrett would lose the match.	17:47
6	Natalya defeated Michelle McCool (c) (with Layla) by disqualification	Singles match for the WWE Divas Championship	05:00
7	Kane (c) defeated The Undertaker (with Paul Bearer) by pinfall	Hell in a Cell match for the World Heavyweight Championship	21:38
(c) / – the champion(s) heading into the match; D / – this was a dark match
