= Hell in a Cell (2016) =

WWE pay-per-view and livestreaming event

- Promotional poster featuring Sasha Banks and Charlotte inside the Hell in a Cell structure
- Promotion: WWE
- Brand: Raw
- Date: October 30, 2016
- City: Boston, Massachusetts
- Venue: TD Garden
- Attendance: 16,119

WWE event chronology
← Previous; No Mercy	Next → NXT TakeOver: Toronto

Hell in a Cell chronology
← Previous; 2015	Next → 2017

The 2016 Hell in a Cell was a professional wrestling pay-per-view (PPV) and livestreaming event produced by WWE, held exclusively for wrestlers from the promotion's main roster brand, Raw. It was the eighth annual Hell in a Cell event and took place on October 30, 2016, at the TD Garden in Boston, Massachusetts. The event centered on the Hell in a Cell match, a 20-foot-high roofed steel cage that surrounds the ring and ringside area with no countouts or disqualifications and the only way to win is by pinfall or submission in the ring.

Eight matches were contested at the event, including one on the Kickoff pre-show. There were three Hell in a Cell matches on the card. For the first time ever for a WWE PPV and livestreaming event, a women's match was the main event, which was also the first-ever women's Hell in a Cell match that saw Charlotte defeat Sasha Banks to capture her third Raw Women's Championship; this was subsequently the first time a women's championship match was the main event. WWE promoted two other matches as main event matches, which were also Hell in a Cell matches: Kevin Owens defeated Seth Rollins to retain the WWE Universal Championship, and in the opening bout, Roman Reigns defeated Rusev to retain the United States Championship.

This was the first Hell in a Cell event held since the reintroduction of the brand extension in July. This was also the first to be brand-exclusive for either brand split period. The first two events in 2009 and 2010 had featured wrestlers from both Raw and SmackDown as brand-exclusive PPV events during the first brand split were discontinued in April 2007, and then the first brand split ended in August 2011.

== Production ==
=== Background ===
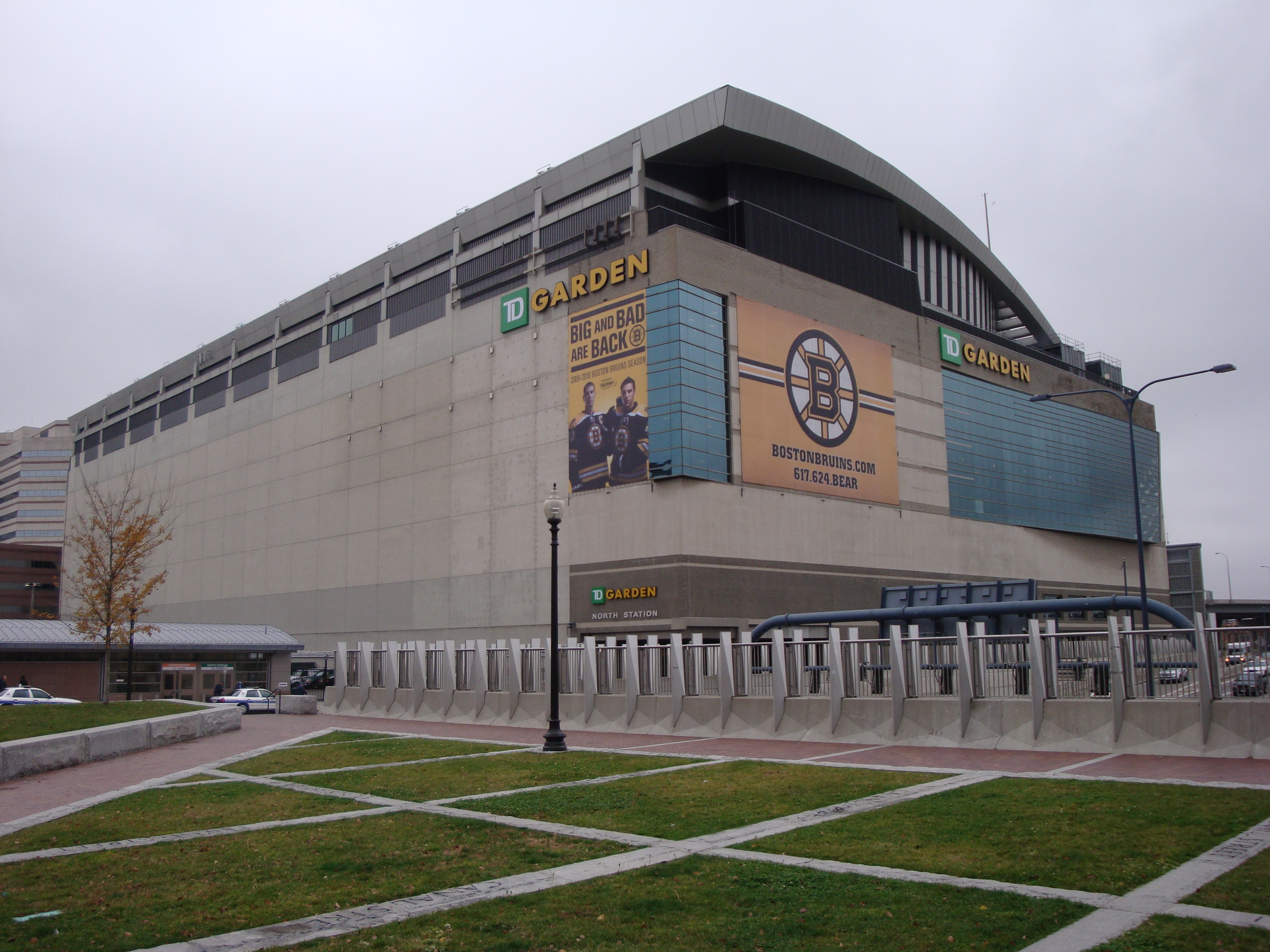
The eighth annual Hell in a Cell event was held at the TD Garden in Boston, Massachusetts.

Hell in a Cell was an annual professional wrestling event produced every October by WWE since 2009. It was originally broadcast exclusively via pay-per-view (PPV) before it began simultaneously livestreaming on the WWE Network in 2014. The concept of the event came from WWE's established Hell in a Cell match, in which competitors fought inside a 20-foot-high roofed cell structure surrounding the ring and ringside area. The main event match of the card was contested under the Hell in a Cell stipulation.

Announced on August 22, 2016, the eighth Hell in a Cell event was scheduled to be held on October 30, 2016, at the TD Garden in Boston, Massachusetts. Tickets went on sale on August 26 through Ticketmaster. Following the reintroduction of the brand extension in July, where WWE again split its main roster into two brands, Raw and SmackDown, where wrestlers were exclusively assigned to perform, brand-exclusive PPV events were also reinstated, which had been discontinued during the first brand split after WrestleMania 23 in April 2007. As a result, the 2016 Hell in a Cell was held exclusively for Raw, which made it the first brand-exclusive Hell in a Cell event, as the first two events in 2009 and 2010 featured wrestlers from both brands before the original brand extension ended in August 2011.

=== Storylines ===
The event comprised eight matches, including one on the Kickoff pre-show, that resulted from scripted storylines. Results were predetermined by WWE's writers on the Raw brand, while storylines were produced on WWE's weekly television show, Monday Night Raw.

At Clash of Champions, Charlotte defeated Sasha Banks and Bayley to retain the Raw Women's Championship. On the October 3 episode of Raw, after Bayley took out Charlotte's protégé, Dana Brooke, backstage, Banks defeated Charlotte by submission to become a two-time champion. A rematch was scheduled for Hell in a Cell, and on the October 10 episode, Banks challenged Charlotte to a Hell in a Cell match, which Charlotte accepted. This was later confirmed by Raw General Manager Mick Foley, making this the first women's Hell in a Cell match.

At Clash of Champions, Roman Reigns defeated Rusev to win the United States Championship. The following night on Raw, the rematch between the two ended in a double countout. On the October 3 episode, Rusev's wife, Lana, demanded a rematch, after which, Rusev attacked Reigns and tried to leave with the title belt, but Reigns attacked him with a Superman Punch and declared he would fight Rusev in a Hell in a Cell match, a request that was later approved by management.

At Clash of Champions, Kevin Owens defeated Seth Rollins to retain the WWE Universal Championship, largely due to interference from Chris Jericho. In the following weeks, Rollins and Owens continued to taunt each other and a rematch was scheduled for Hell in a Cell. On the October 10 episode of Raw, General Manager Mick Foley and Commissioner Stephanie McMahon made the match a Hell in a Cell match to prevent further interference. That same night, Rollins defeated Jericho to keep the match one-on-one; had Jericho won, the match would have become a triple threat match.

Dana Brooke defeated Bayley on the October 17 episode of Raw and attacked her the following week during an arm wrestling contest. On October 26, a match between the two was scheduled for Hell in a Cell.

At Clash of Champions, T. J. Perkins defeated The Brian Kendrick to retain the WWE Cruiserweight Championship. Kendrick subsequently attacked Perkins after the match. The following night on Raw, Kendrick challenged Perkins to another match. The following week, Kendrick defeated Perkins by submission. On the October 10 episode, a match between the two was scheduled for Hell in a Cell.

At Clash of Champions, the final match of the Best of Seven Series for a title opportunity between Cesaro and Sheamus ended in a no contest. The following night on Raw, General Manager Mick Foley would not allow further matches between the two and decided to put Cesaro and Sheamus together as a team against Raw Tag Team Champions The New Day (Big E, Kofi Kingston, and Xavier Woods). Cesaro and Sheamus continued to argue with each other over the following weeks, but on the October 10 episode, they were given a title match against New Day at Hell in a Cell.

On the October 10 episode of Raw, Luke Gallows and Karl Anderson attacked Enzo Amore and Big Cass. The following week, Big Cass defeated Anderson. On October 24, a match between the two teams was scheduled for Hell in a Cell.

On October 26, a cruiserweight division match pitting Cedric Alexander, Lince Dorado, and Sin Cara against Tony Nese, Drew Gulak, and Ariya Daivari was scheduled for the Hell in a Cell Kickoff pre-show.

== Event ==
Other on-screen personnel
Role:	Name:
English commentators	Michael Cole (PPV)
English commentators	Corey Graves (PPV + pre-show)
English commentators	Byron Saxton (PPV)
English commentators	Mauro Ranallo (pre-show)
Spanish commentators	Carlos Cabrera
Spanish commentators	Marcelo Rodríguez
German commentators	Sebastian Hackl
German commentators	Carsten Schaefer
Ring announcer	JoJo
Referees	Chad Patton
Referees	Darrick Moore
Referees	John Cone
Referees	Rod Zapata
Referees	Shawn Bennett
Interviewer	Tom Phillips
Pre-show and Raw Talk panel	Renee Young
Pre-show and Raw Talk panel	Booker T
Pre-show and Raw Talk panel	Jerry Lawler
Pre-show and Raw Talk panel	Lita

=== Pre-show ===
During the Hell in a Cell Kickoff pre-show, cruiserweights Cedric Alexander, Lince Dorado, and Sin Cara faced Tony Nese, Drew Gulak, and Ariya Daivari. Alexander won the match for his team by pinning Gulak after executing the Lumbar Check.

=== Preliminary matches ===
The actual pay-per-view opened with Roman Reigns defending the United States Championship against Rusev (accompanied by Lana) in a Hell in a Cell match. During the match, Reigns executed a Superman Punch for a near-fall. Reigns attempted a Spear, but Rusev countered with a Jumping Sidekick and pushed Reigns into the steel steps, which were positioned on the top rope, for a near-fall. Rusev applied The Accolade on Reigns, but Reigns escaped. Rusev re-applied The Accolade on Reigns, who was draped over the steel steps, using a steel chain, but Reigns countered with a Samoan Drop onto the steel steps. Reigns executed a Spear off the steel steps on Rusev to retain the title.

Next, Bayley fought Dana Brooke. In the end, Bayley performed a Bayley-to-Belly Suplex on Brooke to win the match.

After that, Enzo Amore and Big Cass wrestled Luke Gallows and Karl Anderson. Gallows and Anderson executed the Magic Killer on Enzo to win the match.

In the fourth match, Kevin Owens defended the WWE Universal Championship against Seth Rollins in a Hell in a Cell match. During the match, Owens accidentally sprayed the referee with a fire extinguisher, resulting in a second referee entering the cell to check on the downed referee. Chris Jericho ran into the cell and locked the cell door. Rollins attempted a Pedigree on Owens, but Jericho prevented the attempt, leading to Rollins performing a Pedigree on Jericho. Rollins performed a powerbomb on Owens through two tables stacked outside the ring, which was followed by a frog splash, but Jericho pulled the referee out of the ring to void the pinfall at a two count. Rollins attacked Jericho with a powerbomb into the cell wall. Owens performed a superkick and a pop-up powerbomb on Rollins for a near-fall. Rollins attacked both Owens and Jericho with a chair, but Owens executed a DDT on Rollins onto a chair. Owens performed a powerbomb through two chairs on Rollins to retain the title. After the match, Jericho attacked Rollins with a Codebreaker.

Next, T. J. Perkins defended the WWE Cruiserweight Championship against The Brian Kendrick. The match ended when Kendrick feigned a knee injury. A concerned Perkins checked on Kendrick, who attacked Perkins with a headbutt and applied the Captain's Hook. Perkins submitted, thus Kendrick won the title.

After that, The New Day (Big E and Xavier Woods, accompanied by Kofi Kingston) defended the Raw Tag Team Championship against Cesaro and Sheamus. In the end, Cesaro applied the Sharpshooter on Woods. Meanwhile, Sheamus attacked Big E with The New Day's trombone, followed by Kingston executing Trouble in Paradise on Sheamus. As Kingston was not a contestant in the match, the referee disqualified The New Day for outside interference. At the same time, Woods submitted to Cesaro's Sharpshooter. However, as the referee had already issued a disqualification, Cesaro and Sheamus won the match, but The New Day retained the titles.

=== Main event ===
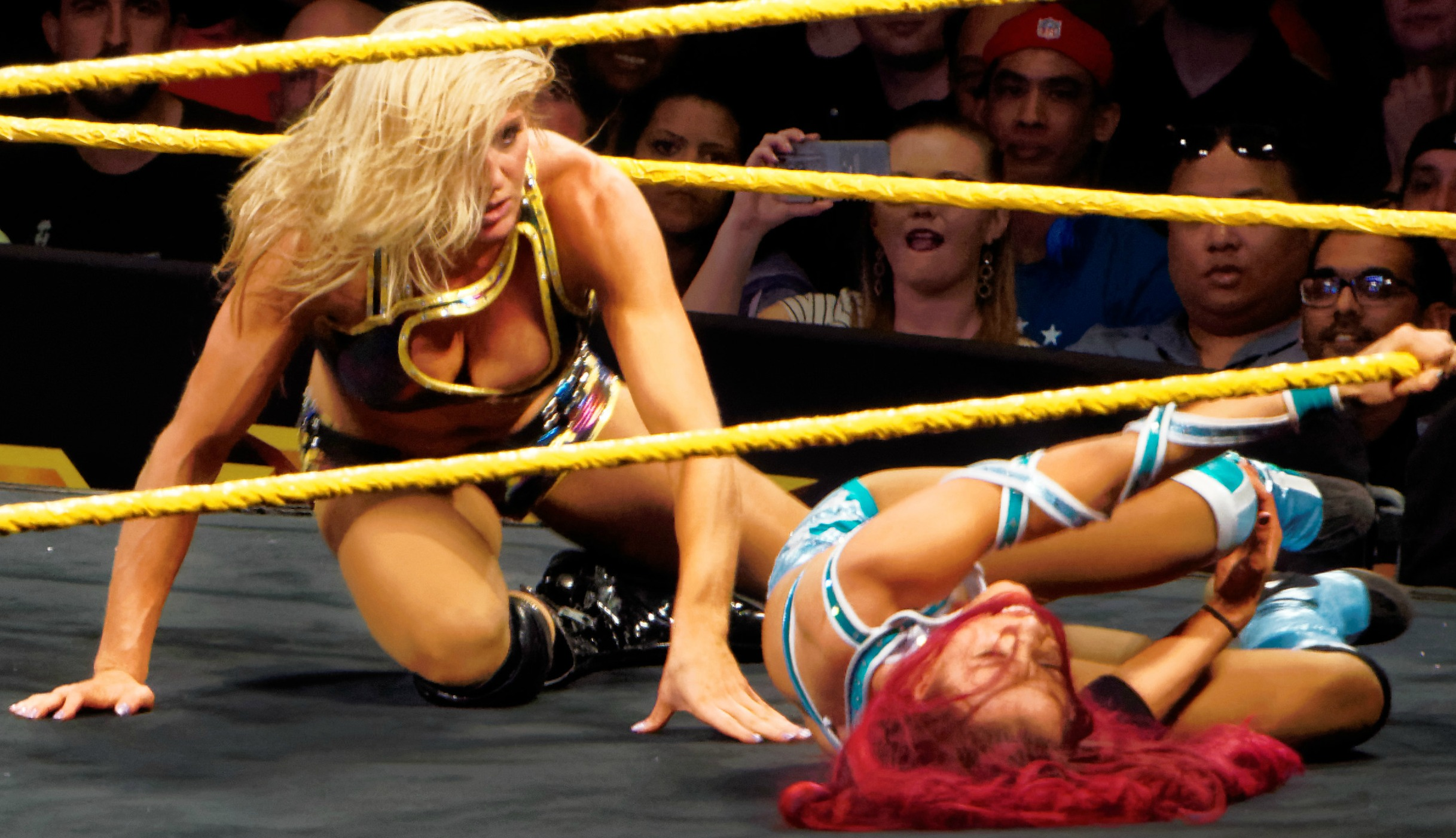
Charlotte and Sasha Banks made history as the first two women to compete inside Hell in a Cell as well as the first two women to wrestle in the main event of a WWE pay-per-view. Charlotte defeated Banks to regain the Raw Women's Championship for a third time.

In the main event, Sasha Banks defended the Raw Women's Championship against Charlotte in the first-ever women's Hell in a Cell match, which was also the first-ever women's match to main event a WWE PPV. Before the cell lowered, Charlotte attacked Banks, leading to the two fighting outside the cell and into the crowd. Charlotte climbed the cell wall, but was knocked down by Banks. As Banks attempted to climb down, Charlotte caught Banks and powerbombed her through an announce table. Banks was about to be taken away on a stretcher and Charlotte to be declared the winner by forfeit, but Banks got off the stretcher and entered the cell, thus the match officially started. Banks dominated Charlotte early on, but the momentum shifted when Charlotte catapulted Banks into the cell wall for a nearfall. Banks applied the Bank Statement on Charlotte, but Charlotte got to her feet and tossed Banks over the top rope and out of the ring. Charlotte introduced a steel chair, but Banks performed a suicide dive on Charlotte. Later, Charlotte slammed Banks back first onto the chair for a nearfall. Outside the ring, Banks performed a Meteora on Charlotte from the cell wall. Banks then paid tribute to Eddie Guerrero by executing the Three Amigos and a Frog Splash on Charlotte for a nearfall. Banks re-applied the Bank Statement on Charlotte, but Charlotte escaped by rolling out of the ring. Banks performed her double knees on Charlotte through the chair for another nearfall. Charlotte then slammed Banks head first on the steel ring steps. Afterwards, Charlotte retrieved a table and attempted a Superplex on Banks through it, but Banks countered, knocking Charlotte onto the table. Banks retrieved another table, but Charlotte used it to ram Banks into the cell wall. Charlotte applied the Figure Four Leglock, but as she bridged into the Figure Eight, Banks attacked Charlotte with a chair to break the submission. After the two traded blows, Charlotte countered another Bank Statement attempt and performed three backbreakers on Banks for a nearfall. In the closing moments, Charlotte attempted a Moonsault on Banks through the table, but Banks cut her off. Banks then positioned the table on the opposite side of the ring and attempted a Powerbomb on Charlotte through it, but her back gave out. Charlotte took advantage by throwing Banks onto the table two times, and then executed Natural Selection to win the title for a third time.

== Reception ==
The Universal and Raw Women's championship matches were praised, while the other matches received mixed reviews.

Ryan Dilbert of Bleacher Report praised the Raw Women's Championship match, giving it a grade of A++, the highest rated match of the event, stating that Sasha Banks and Charlotte's showdown "was everything it needed to be and more", they "proved that they and their peers belong in that sadistic contest", and "made it clear that WWE made the right move in making them the pay-per-view's main event". He also said that the match was "savage, dramatic and breathtaking", Banks and Charlotte "exceeded" the "impossibly high" expectations for the match, the bout was bolstered by "world-class heel work from Charlotte" and "the amount of pathos Banks generated by fighting from underneath, refusing to quit, even when her back threatened to", and concluded by saying that "Banks and Charlotte made it clear that women are more than welcome inside Hell in a Cell and that the women's revolution isn't just a tagline. It's the reality unfolding before our eyes". Dilbert gave the Universal Championship match a grade of A, stating that superstars can still "produce great Hell in a Cell matches in the PG era", the match "was a wild ride with an intriguing story", while saying that "chairs, tables and the cage door all played vital roles". He also mentioned that "Rollins and Owens helped erase memories of an uneven, underwhelming feud here", and concluded by stating that "WWE Creative has to keep up the momentum, figuring out better ways to tell each man's story going forward". Dilbert gave the United States Championship and the Luke Gallows and Karl Anderson vs. Enzo Amore and Big Cass matches C+ grades, the Bayley vs. Dana Brooke match a C− grade (the lowest rated match of the event), the Kickoff pre-show match a B− grade, the Cruiserweight Championship match a B grade, and the Raw Tag Team Championship match a B+ grade.

Wade Keller of Pro Wrestling Torch gave the United States Championship match 3.25 stars, stating that it was "methodical, but brutal, and well paced for its place on the card", and that Roman Reigns' "over reliance on punches and clotheslines continues to be a drawback in any of his matches". Keller gave the Universal Championship match 4.25 stars, the highest rated match of the event. He called the match "impressive" and that he "liked the pace and the chances taken and the big moves executed", while stating that Seth Rollins and Kevin Owens "sold big moves and didn't just get up as if nothing happened to do another big spot". He also stated that once Chris Jericho joined the fray, "it seemed to mean Owens would win, but there had to be some viewers thinking Jericho might turn on Owens or there'd be a misunderstanding or miscue between them leading to Seth getting a win". Keller gave the main event match 3.75 stars, stating that "the crowd reacted to the finish like they weren't expecting that to be it", but he congratulated Sasha Banks and Charlotte "for putting on a very good Hell in a Cell match without going as overboard as I expected with bit spots from high places on the Cell". He said that "the teaser at the beginning was well done and probably had some skeptics believing that Sasha was too hurt to continue", and concluded by stating that "Charlotte winning with her finisher helps get her finisher over which was worth it compared to doing some sort of big spot, even though I think the fans expected some sort of bigger spot". Keller gave the Bayley vs. Dana Brooke match 1 star, the lowest rated match of the event, the Luke Gallows and Karl Anderson vs. Enzo Amore and Big Cass match 1.75 stars, the Cruiserweight Championship match 2.5 stars, and the Raw Tag Team Championship match 2 stars.

Dave Meltzer of the Wrestling Observer Newsletter gave the United States, Universal, and Raw Women's championship matches 3.25 stars, 4 stars (the highest rated match of the event), and 2.75 stars, respectively. The Kickoff pre-show match received 3.5 stars, the Bayley vs. Dana Brooke match received 1.5 stars (the lowest rated match of the event), the Luke Gallows and Karl Anderson vs. Enzo Amore and Big Cass match received 2 stars, the Cruiserweight Championship match received 1.75 stars, and the Raw Tag Team Championship match received 2.75 stars.

== Aftermath ==
While the 2016 Hell in a Cell event was held exclusively for Raw, the 2017 event was in turn held exclusively for SmackDown.

=== Heading into Survivor Series ===
Earlier in October before Hell in a Cell, SmackDown commissioner Shane McMahon and general manager Daniel Bryan challenged Raw to three traditional Survivor Series elimination matches – involving each brand's best five male wrestlers, best five female wrestlers, and best five tag teams, respectively, to which Stephanie McMahon accepted. After Hell in a Cell, focus then shifted on determining which wrestlers would represent Team Raw for the three teams at Survivor Series the following month.

SmackDown's Intercontinental Champion Dolph Ziggler made an open challenge to any wrestler on Raw to face him for the title at Survivor Series. On the November 7 episode of Raw, Sami Zayn revealed that Mick Foley wanted him to face Ziggler for the Intercontinental title, and then defeated Rusev, solidifying his spot in the title match at Survivor Series. Also, Raw and SmackDown's General Managers came to a negotiation where Foley agreed that since SmackDown was defending the Intercontinental title against a Raw wrestler, he would allow a SmackDown wrestler to challenge new Cruiserweight Champion Brian Kendrick for that title, and if the SmackDown wrestler were to win, the entire cruiserweight division would move to SmackDown.

=== Continuing rivalries ===
After Survivor Series, Kevin Owens and Seth Rollins would continue their rivalry over the WWE Universal Championship. On the November 21 episode of Raw, they battled for the title in a No Disqualification match, with Roman Reigns and Chris Jericho banned from ringside. Owens retained after Jericho, who was disguised as a masked fan, interfered and attacked Rollins. A match between Rollins and Jericho would later be scheduled for Roadblock: End of the Line, while Owens was also scheduled to defend his title against Reigns at the event.

Cesaro and Sheamus would earn another match against The New Day (Big E, Kofi Kingston, and Xavier Woods) for the Raw Tag Team Championship by being the sole survivors for Team Raw in the tag team elimination match at Survivor Series. On the following Raw, however, The New Day (Kingston and Big E) retained. On the December 5 episode, Cesaro and Sheamus took on Luke Gallows and Karl Anderson to determine the number one contenders, but the match ended in a no-contest after interference from The New Day. This turned the title match on the December 12 episode into a triple threat tag team match, where The New Day again retained. At WWE Tribute to the Troops, Cesaro and Sheamus earned another title match at Roadblock: End of the Line by winning a fatal four-way tag team match.

Sasha Banks and Charlotte Flair would continue their rivalry over the Raw Women's Championship as well. On the November 28 episode of Raw, after invoking her rematch clause a week prior, Banks defeated Charlotte in a Falls Count Anywhere match in the latter's hometown of Charlotte, North Carolina to win the title for a third time, and was endorsed by Charlotte's father, Ric Flair, after the match. The following week, Banks challenged Charlotte to an Iron Woman match for the title at Roadblock: End of the Line, and Charlotte accepted.

== Results ==
No.	Results	Stipulations	Times
1^{P}	Cedric Alexander, Lince Dorado, and Sin Cara defeated Tony Nese, Drew Gulak, and Ariya Daivari by pinfall	Six-man tag team match	9:45
2	Roman Reigns (c) defeated Rusev (with Lana) by pinfall	Hell in a Cell match for the WWE United States Championship	24:35
3	Bayley defeated Dana Brooke by pinfall	Singles match	6:30
4	Luke Gallows and Karl Anderson defeated Enzo Amore and Big Cass by pinfall	Tag team match	6:45
5	Kevin Owens (c) (with Chris Jericho) defeated Seth Rollins by pinfall	Hell in a Cell match for the WWE Universal Championship	23:15
6	The Brian Kendrick defeated T. J. Perkins (c) by submission	Singles match for the WWE Cruiserweight Championship	10:35
7	Cesaro and Sheamus defeated The New Day (Big E and Xavier Woods) (c) (with Kofi Kingston) by disqualification	Tag team match for the WWE Raw Tag Team Championship	11:15
8	Charlotte defeated Sasha Banks (c) by pinfall	Hell in a Cell match for the WWE Raw Women's Championship	22:25
(c) / – the champion(s) heading into the match; P / – the match was broadcast on the pre-show
