= Extreme Rules (2021) =

WWE pay-per-view and livestreaming event

- Promotional poster featuring Becky Lynch
- Promotion: WWE
- Brand(s): Raw; SmackDown
- Date: September 26, 2021
- City: Columbus, Ohio
- Venue: Nationwide Arena
- Attendance: 9,455

WWE event chronology
← Previous; NXT TakeOver 36	Next → Crown Jewel

Extreme Rules chronology
← Previous; The Horror Show	Next → 2022

The 2021 Extreme Rules was a professional wrestling pay-per-view (PPV) and livestreaming event produced by WWE, held for wrestlers from the promotion's main roster brands, Raw and SmackDown. It was the 13th annual Extreme Rules event and took place on September 26, 2021, at the Nationwide Arena in Columbus, Ohio. While the theme of the annual event had been that it featured various hardcore-based matches, the 2021 event only had one such match.

The event was originally scheduled to take place on July 18 at the SAP Center in San Jose, California, but it was relocated, initially due to issues stemming from the COVID-19 pandemic with the event instead slated to be produced from the WWE ThunderDome, a bio-secure bubble that at the time was hosted at the Yuengling Center in Tampa, Florida; this came after a 2020 postponement as that year's event had also originally been scheduled for the SAP Center but instead had to be held behind closed doors at the WWE Performance Center in Orlando, Florida. After WWE announced that it would return to live touring with full capacity crowds in mid-July, Money in the Bank was instead scheduled for July 18 in Fort Worth, Texas, with Extreme Rules rescheduled and replacing an originally planned Clash of Champions, which subsequently marked the first and only Extreme Rules event to be held in September. This 2021 event also saw a return to its original name, after the previous year's event was titled as The Horror Show at Extreme Rules, and it was the first Extreme Rules event to livestream on SonyLIV in India and Peacock in the United States following the shutdown of the Indian version of the WWE Network in February and the American version in April.

Seven matches were contested at the event, including one on the Kickoff pre-show. In the main event, which was the only hardcore-based match on the card, Roman Reigns defeated "The Demon" Finn Bálor in an Extreme Rules match to retain SmackDown's Universal Championship. In other prominent matches, The Usos (Jey Uso and Jimmy Uso) defeated The Street Profits (Angelo Dawkins and Montez Ford) to retain the SmackDown Tag Team Championship, Damian Priest defeated Jeff Hardy and Sheamus in a triple threat match to retain Raw's United States Championship, and the SmackDown Women's Championship match between defending champion Becky Lynch and Bianca Belair ended in a no contest after Sasha Banks made her return and subsequently ambushed both competitors. Notably, this was the only Extreme Rules event where no titles changed hands—five championships were defended and retained

The event received mixed reviews from critics and fans. While the tag team matches, main event, and SmackDown Women's Championship matches were mostly praised, many criticized the endings of the latter two, while also reserving criticism for the lack of hardcore-based matches.

== Production ==
=== Background ===
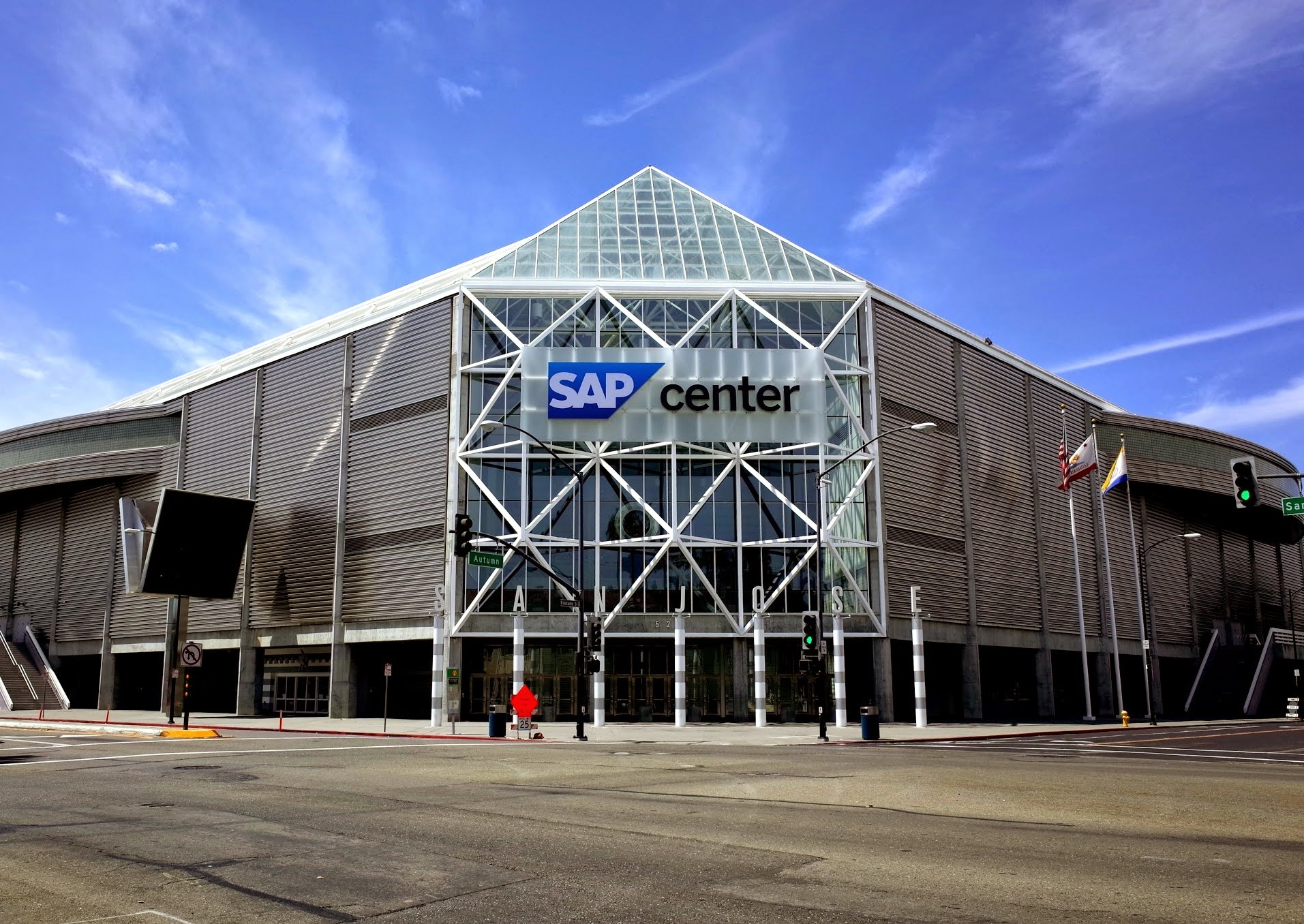
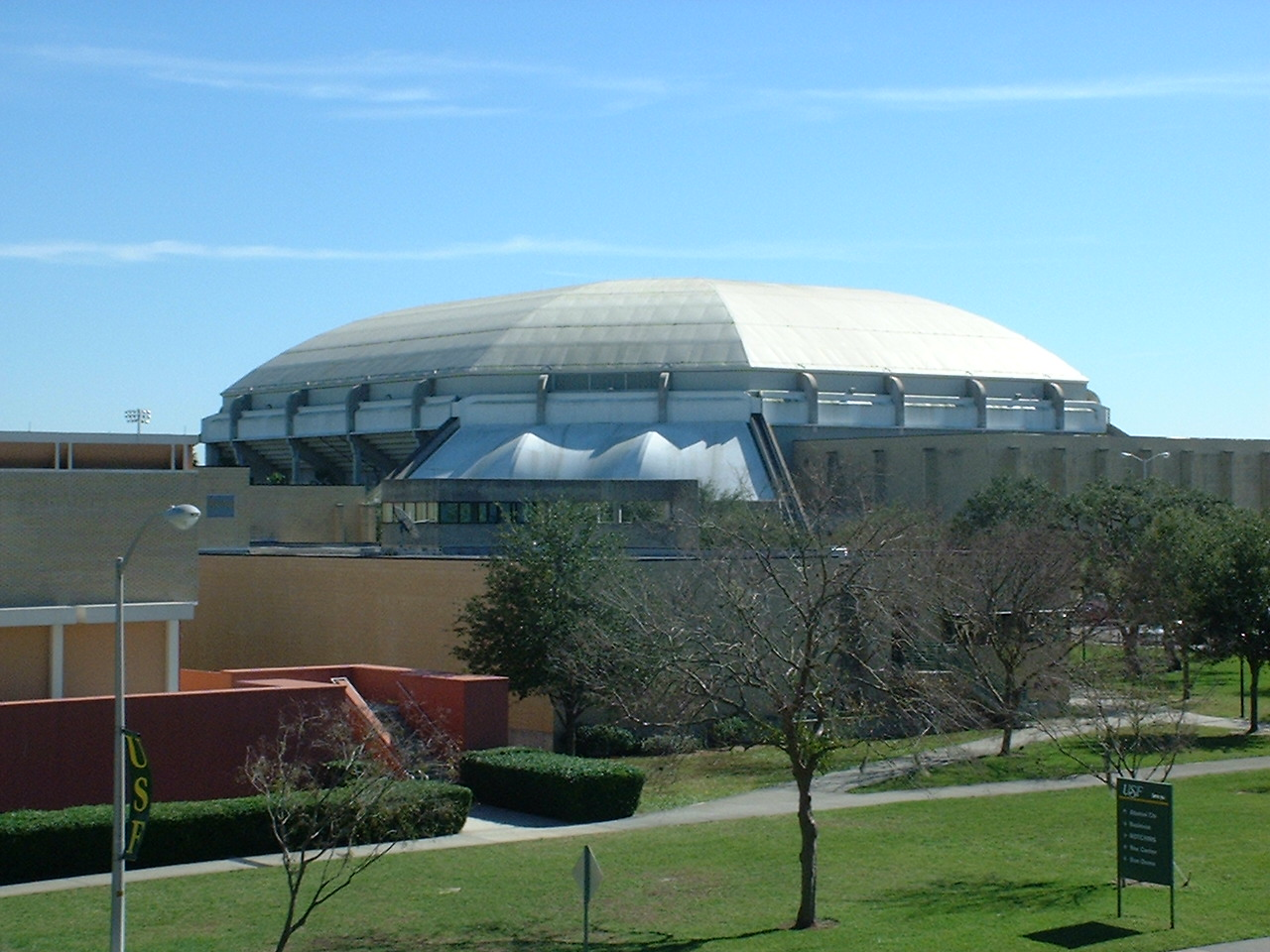
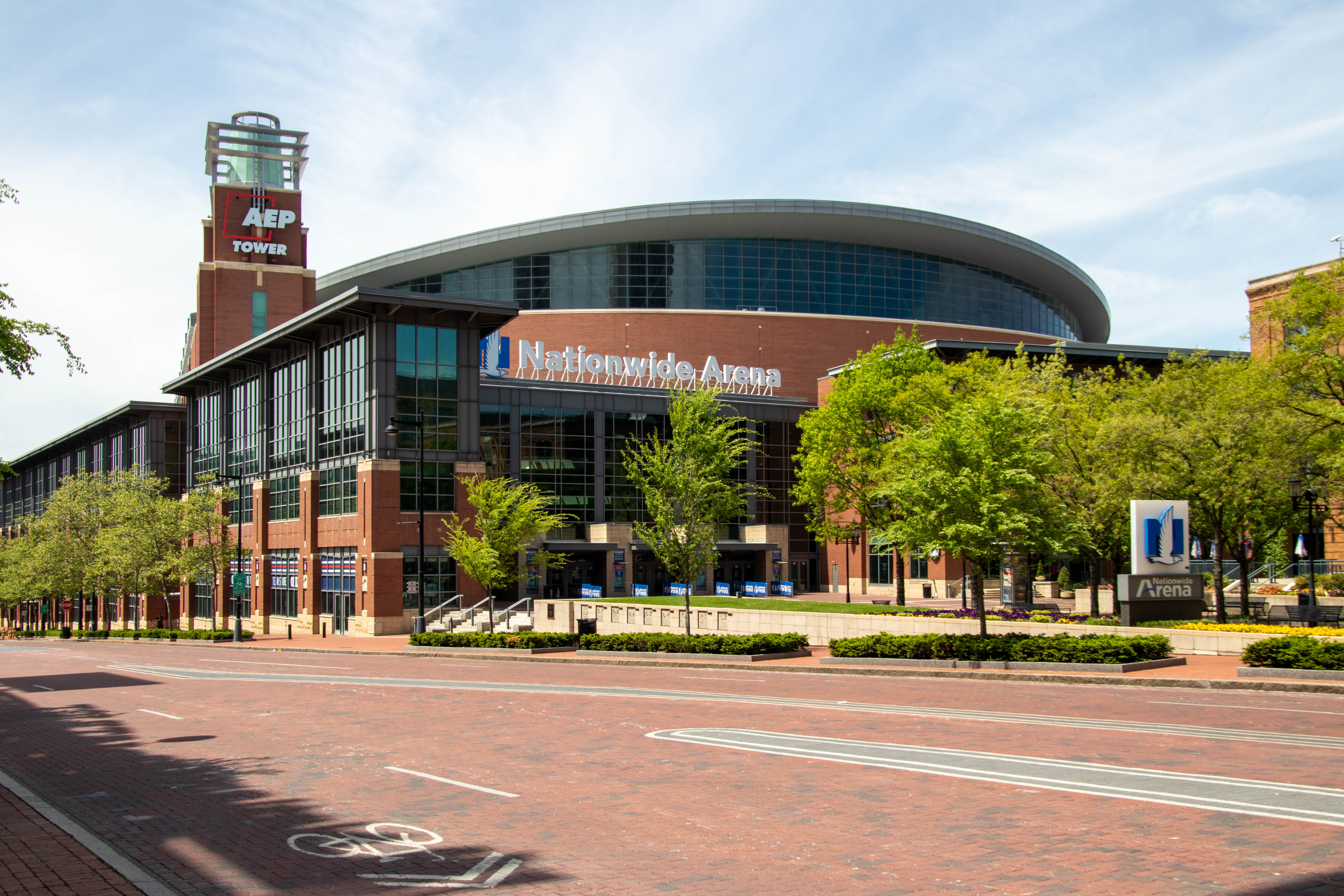
The 13th annual Extreme Rules event was originally planned to be held at the SAP Center in San Jose, California in July following the 2020 event's postponement, but due to issues initially stemming from the COVID-19 pandemic, it was going to be produced from the WWE ThunderDome, a bio-secure bubble that at the time was hosted at the Yuengling Center in Tampa, Florida. However, after WWE resumed touring with live fans in mid-July, Extreme Rules was rescheduled for September at the Nationwide Arena in Columbus, Ohio.

Extreme Rules was an annual professional wrestling event produced by WWE since 2009. It was originally broadcast exclusively via pay-per-view (PPV) before it began simultaneously livestreaming on the WWE Network in 2014. The concept of the event was that it featured various matches that were contested under hardcore rules and generally featured one Extreme Rules match. The defunct Extreme Championship Wrestling promotion, which WWE acquired in 2003, originally used the "extreme rules" term to describe the regulations for all of its matches; WWE adopted the term, using it in place of "hardcore match" or "hardcore rules".

The 2020 Extreme Rules event was originally planned to take place at the SAP Center in San Jose, California, but had to be relocated to the WWE Performance Center in Orlando, Florida and held behind closed doors due to the COVID-19 pandemic. The SAP Center put out an official statement that they would instead host the 2021 event. The venue also announced that there would be no refunds (unless a new date was not determined within 60 days), but tickets purchased would be honored for the following year's event. However, in May 2021, it was reported that due to the ongoing pandemic, the 2021 event would be held on July 18 from the WWE ThunderDome, a bio-secure bubble that at the time was hosted at the Yuengling Center in Tampa, Florida, but later that month after WWE announced that they would be resuming live touring in mid-July, that date was instead given to Money in the Bank in Fort Worth, Texas.

On July 9, 2021, WWE announced that the 13th Extreme Rules event would instead be held on September 26 at the Nationwide Arena in Columbus, Ohio, which was reportedly the planned date and venue for Clash of Champions, which was in turn canceled and discontinued. Tickets went on sale on July 16 through Ticketmaster. The 2021 event also returned the event to its original title of "Extreme Rules" after the 2020 event was titled as The Horror Show at Extreme Rules due to having horror-themed matches on its card. It featured wrestlers from the Raw and SmackDown brand divisions.

=== Broadcast outlets ===
The event was broadcast on traditional PPV worldwide. It was also available to livestream on Peacock in the United States, SonyLIV in India, and the WWE Network everywhere else. This was the first Extreme Rules to livestream on SonyLIV and Peacock, following the shutdown of the Indian version of the WWE Network in February and the American version in April.

=== Storylines ===
The event comprised seven matches, including one on the Kickoff pre-show, that resulted from scripted storylines. Results were predetermined by WWE's writers on the Raw and SmackDown brands, while storylines were produced on WWE's weekly television shows, Monday Night Raw and Friday Night SmackDown.

On the July 23 episode of SmackDown, after Roman Reigns declined John Cena's challenge to a match for the Universal Championship at SummerSlam, Finn Bálor challenged Reigns for the title at the event, which Reigns accepted. During the contract signing, however, an altercation occurred, resulting in Cena signing the contract and becoming Reigns's opponent at SummerSlam where Reigns retained. Bálor then got his opportunity at the title on the September 3 episode of SmackDown, but he was unsuccessful. A rematch between the two for the Universal Championship was scheduled for Extreme Rules. On the September 10 episode, it was revealed that Reigns would be facing Bálor's alter ego, "The Demon", and it was later stipulated to be an Extreme Rules match.

At SummerSlam, Bianca Belair was originally set to defend the SmackDown Women's Championship against Sasha Banks. However, Banks was unable to appear for unknown reasons. Carmella was then announced as Banks's replacement. Before the match could begin, however, Becky Lynch, in her first appearance since the Raw after Money in the Bank in May 2020, made a surprise return, attacked Carmella, challenged Belair, and subsequently defeated her in 26 seconds to win the title. On the following SmackDown, Belair challenged Lynch to a rematch, however, Lynch refused. Belair then won a fatal four-way elimination match to become the number one contender. The following week, Belair challenged Lynch to a match for that night, but Lynch again refused, stating she would defend the title when she was ready. Later backstage, WWE officials Adam Pearce and Sonya Deville told Lynch that she would defend the title against Belair at Extreme Rules.

At SummerSlam, Damian Priest defeated Sheamus to win the United States Championship. On the August 30 episode of Raw, Priest retained the title against Sheamus and Drew McIntyre in a triple threat match. On the following episode, Sheamus defeated McIntyre to earn a United States Championship match against Priest at Extreme Rules. On the September 20 episode, Jeff Hardy defeated Sheamus to earn a spot in the title match at Extreme Rules, thus making it a triple threat match.

On the September 17 episode of SmackDown, during a tag team match, Liv Morgan sent Carmella into a turnbuckle. The impact caused Carmella to break her nose, and for Morgan's team to win via countout. Afterwards, Morgan challenged Carmella to a match at Extreme Rules, and Carmella later accepted. The match was later scheduled for the Kickoff pre-show.

On the August 23 episode of Raw, while Charlotte Flair was talking about her Raw Women's Championship win at SummerSlam two days prior, she was confronted by Alexa Bliss, who held a doll named "Lilly". Bliss said that she only wanted to say "Hi". Two weeks later, after Flair's successful title defense, Bliss appeared on the TitanTron and asked Flair to come to "the playground", only for Flair to refuse. Flair then offered Bliss a title match at Extreme Rules.

On the August 27 episode of SmackDown, after Finn Bálor challenged Roman Reigns for the Universal Championship for the following week, SmackDown Tag Team Champions The Usos (Jey Uso and Jimmy Uso) attacked Bálor, only for The Street Profits (Angelo Dawkins and Montez Ford) to lay out The Usos, with Reigns looking on from outside the ring. The following week, The Street Profits defeated The Usos via disqualification when The Usos ignored the referee's five count, after which, The Street Profits stood tall. A title match between the two teams took place on the September 10 episode, where The Street Profits again won via disqualification, this time after interference from Reigns. On September 16, another title match between the two teams was scheduled for Extreme Rules.

==== Canceled and rescheduled match ====
On the August 30 episode of Raw, RK-Bro (Randy Orton and Riddle) defeated Bobby Lashley and MVP to retain the Raw Tag Team Championship. After the match, Lashley performed a Spear on Riddle, only to be laid out by an RKO from Orton. The following week, MVP and Lashley interrupted RK-Bro's promo and entered themselves into the Tag Team Turmoil match to determine the number one contenders for the Raw Tag Team Championship, which they subsequently won. Afterwards, Orton performed an RKO on Lashley again. It was also announced that Lashley would defend the WWE Championship against Orton at Extreme Rules. However, the tag team title match scheduled for the September 13 episode was canceled and the WWE Championship match was rescheduled for that subsequent episode, where Lashley retained, but lost the title to Big E, who cashed in his Money in the Bank contract.

== Event ==
Other on-screen personnel
Role:	Name:
English commentators	Michael Cole (SmackDown)
English commentators	Pat McAfee (SmackDown)
English commentators	Jimmy Smith (Raw)
English commentators	Corey Graves (Raw)
English commentators	Byron Saxton (Raw)
Spanish commentators	Carlos Cabrera
Spanish commentators	Marcelo Rodriguez
Ring announcers	Greg Hamilton (SmackDown)
Ring announcers	Mike Rome (Raw)
Referees	Jason Ayers
Referees	Jessika Carr
Referees	Dan Engler
Referees	Darrick Moore
Referees	Chad Patton
Referees	Rod Zapata
Interviewers	Sarah Schreiber
Pre-show panel	Kayla Braxton
Pre-show panel	Kevin Patrick
Pre-show panel	John Bradshaw Layfield
Pre-show panel	Peter Rosenberg
Pre-show panel	Booker T
Pre-show panel	Sonya Deville

=== Pre-show ===
During the Extreme Rules Kickoff pre-show, while The New Day (WWE Champion Big E, Kofi Kingston, and Xavier Woods) were interviewed backstage after arriving at the arena, they were confronted by AJ Styles and Omos. Bobby Lashley then attacked Big E from behind and all six men brawled. Shortly thereafter, backstage personnel separated them. A six-man tag team match was announced for the main card.

Also during the pre-show, Liv Morgan faced Carmella. Before the match, Carmella insulted Morgan by stating that Morgan was not beautiful. Morgan then attacked Carmella from behind and the match began. In the end, Morgan threw Carmella into the announce table. Back in the ring, Morgan performed a Springboard Flatliner on Carmella to win the match.

=== Preliminary matches ===
The actual event opened with The New Day (WWE Champion Big E, Kofi Kingston, and Xavier Woods) facing Bobby Lashley, AJ Styles, and Omos in a six-man tag team match. During the match, Kingston tried to make the tag to Big E, but Lashley pulled Big E off the apron and attacked him. Woods tagged in and performed a Tornado DDT on Lashley for a nearfall. Lashley then performed a Running Powerslam on Woods for a nearfall. Big E tagged in and hit three Belly-to-Belly Suplexes and a Warrior Splash on Styles. Big E and Kingston performed a Double Stomp/Powerbomb combination on Styles, but Lashley broke up the pin. Lashley went for a Spear, but Kingston sent him outside the ring. Kingston went for a Suicide Dive on Lashley, but Omos caught Kingston in mid-air with a Chop. As Lashley went for the Spear on Big E, Styles tagged himself in and missed a Phenomenal Forearm on Big E while Lashley tagged himself in and Lashley accidentally executed a Spear on Styles. Big E executed a Big Ending on Lashley to win the match.

Next, The Usos (Jey Uso and Jimmy Uso) defended the SmackDown Tag Team Championship against The Street Profits (Angelo Dawkins and Montez Ford). The Usos attacked the injured ribs on Ford throughout the match. Towards the end, The Street Profits performed a Blockbuster on Jimmy, and Ford got a nearfall. The Usos threw Dawkins into the barricade and Ford hit a Running Flip Dive on both Jey and Jimmy. Back in the ring, Ford executed a Frog Splash on Jey for a nearfall. The Usos executed a Double Superkick on Dawkins and one to Ford. The Usos followed up with a Double Superfly Splash on Ford to retain the title.

After that, Charlotte Flair defended the Raw Women's Championship against Alexa Bliss. During the match, Flair attempted a Top Rope Moonsault, but Bliss moved, however, Flair landed on her feet and performed a Moonsault for a nearfall. Flair missed Natural Selection and Bliss performed a Sunset Flip Powerbomb for a nearfall. Bliss went for Twisted Bliss, but Flair moved. Flair went for the Figure-Eight, Bliss countered into an Inside Cradle for a nearfall. Bliss executed a DDT, but Flair got her foot on the bottom rope. Flair grabbed Lilly and threw it at Bliss, causing a distraction for Flair to execute the Queen's Boot and Natural Selection to retain the title. Afterwards, Flair attacked Bliss and ripped Lilly apart. A distraught Bliss sat in the ring and cried while holding Lily's remnants.

In the fourth match, Damian Priest defended Raw's United States Championship against Jeff Hardy and Sheamus in a triple threat match. As the match started, Sheamus performed a Brogue Kick on Hardy. During the match, Priest performed a Falcon Arrow on Hardy, but Sheamus broke up the pin. On the outside, Sheamus threw Priest into the ring post. Hardy performed Double Whisper in the Wind and got a nearfall on Sheamus. Sheamus applied the Cloverleaf on Hardy, but Priest broke it up. Sheamus performed the White Noise on Priest, but Hardy broke up the pin. Hardy hit the Twist of Fate on both Priest and Sheamus. In the end, Hardy performed the Swanton Bomb onto both Priest and Sheamus. Sheamus performed a Brogue Kick on Hardy, and Priest rolled up Sheamus to retain the title.

In the penultimate match, Becky Lynch defended the SmackDown Women's Championship against Bianca Belair. Belair went for the Kiss of Death, but Lynch got out of the ring. Lynch then went for the Manhandle Slam and the Dis-Arm-Her, but Belair countered both times. Towards the end on the outside, Lynch performed a Hurricanrana to Belair into the steel steps. Back in the ring, Lynch attempted an Armbar, but Belair countered into a Powerbomb for a nearfall. Lynch locked in the Dis-Arm-Her, but Belair countered and went for the Kiss of Death, but Sasha Banks returned and attacked Belair, causing a no contest with Lynch retaining the title. Afterwards, Banks laid out both Belair and Lynch with a Backstabber.

=== Main event ===
In the main event, Roman Reigns defended SmackDown's Universal Championship against "The Demon" Finn Bálor in an Extreme Rules match. During the match, Bálor attacked Reigns with a bundle of kendo sticks taped together. Bálor pulled out a table, but Reigns performed the Running Driveby Dropkick to put Bálor head first into the ring post. The two brawled into the crowd where Bálor executed a Crossbody, putting Reigns through a table. Back in the ring, Reigns put Bálor through a table with a Uranage for a nearfall. Reigns executed a Superman Punch on Bálor for a nearfall. Reigns executed a Spear on Bálor and kicked out while also delivering a low blow to Reigns. Bálor executed the Coup de Grâce on Reigns, but The Usos (Jey Uso and Jimmy Uso) came out and pulled Bálor out of the ring. Bálor put Jey through the announce table with a Powerbomb. Reigns speared Bálor through the barricade. With everyone down, red lights flashed and a heartbeat sound was heard as The Demon rose to his feet and attacked Reigns with a steel chair and put him through a table. As Bálor went for the Coup de Grâce, the top rope snapped and Bálor fell and hurt his knee. Reigns performed a Spear on Bálor to retain the title.

== Reception ==
Dave Meltzer rated the main event 4 stars, the highest of the night. The lowest rated match of the night was kick-off show match at 2.25 stars. Elsewhere, the six-man tag received 3.5 stars, the Smackdown Tag Team Championship match received 3.25 stars, the United States Championship match received 3.75 stars, the Raw Women's Championship match received 2.5 stars, and the SmackDown Women's Championship match 3 stars.

== Aftermath ==
The 2021 Extreme Rules would be the only Extreme Rules to be held in September, as the following year's event was held in October, which was the first time and only time for the event to be held in October as it would be the final Extreme Rules event.

=== Raw ===
The next night's episode of Raw opened with Big E defending the WWE Championship against former champion Bobby Lashley, which ended via disqualification due to New Day's Kofi Kingston and Xavier Woods interfering with Cedric Alexander and Shelton Benjamin, hinting a reunion of The Hurt Business. A rematch took place later in the main event which was stipulated as a Steel Cage match to prevent interference where Big E defeated Lashley to retain the championship.

United States Champion Damian Priest defended the title against Sheamus in a no disqualification match, where Priest retained once again.

Raw Women's Champion Charlotte Flair issued an open challenge for the championship after claiming that she had beaten every woman on the roster. The challenge was answered by Doudrop, who lost the match due to interference from Eva Marie.

On the January 3, 2022, episode of Raw, it was announced that Alexa Bliss would begin therapy sessions for her broken Lilly doll. The therapy sessions continued until the February 14 episode, where Bliss named herself as the final entrant in the women's Elimination Chamber match at Elimination Chamber.

=== SmackDown ===
On October 1, it was announced that Becky Lynch would defend the SmackDown Women's Championship against Bianca Belair and Sasha Banks in a triple threat match at Crown Jewel. Also on that night's episode of SmackDown, Banks and Belair had their match, which Banks won after interference from Lynch. The three signed the contract for their match the following week, and a brawl ensued, with Belair standing tall after sending Lynch onto Banks and through a table. Banks then faced Lynch on the October 15 episode, which Banks won after interference from Belair.

Liv Morgan and Carmella were scheduled to have a rematch on the following SmackDown, but the match never officially started as Carmella was provided with a "bedazzled carbon-fiber mask" and laid out Morgan. The two then had a rematch the following week, which was also a quarterfinal match for the inaugural Queen's Crown tournament, the female version of the King of the Ring tournament. Carmella won to advance in the tournament. On the October 15 episode, Morgan grabbed Carmella's mask, causing her to lose in the semifinals. Their feud would continue on Raw after both were drafted to that brand during the 2021 WWE Draft, where Carmella defeated Morgan on the October 25 episode, but two weeks later, Morgan won a fatal five-way match by pinning Carmella to become the number one contender for the Raw Women's Championship.

On the October 15 episode of SmackDown, The Usos (Jey Uso and Jimmy Uso) again retained the SmackDown Tag Team Championship against The Street Profits (Angelo Dawkins and Montez Ford), this time in a Street Fight.

Also on the following episode of SmackDown, the 2021 WWE Draft began and concluded with the October 4 episode of Raw. The results of the draft went into effect beginning with the October 22 episode of SmackDown, the night after Crown Jewel.

== Results ==
No.	Results	Stipulations	Times
1^{P}	Liv Morgan defeated Carmella by pinfall	Singles match	7:52
2	The New Day (Big E, Kofi Kingston, and Xavier Woods) defeated Bobby Lashley, AJ Styles, and Omos by pinfall	Six-man tag team match	18:15
3	The Usos (Jey Uso and Jimmy Uso) (c) defeated The Street Profits (Angelo Dawkins and Montez Ford) by pinfall	Tag team match for the WWE SmackDown Tag Team Championship	13:45
4	Charlotte Flair (c) defeated Alexa Bliss by pinfall	Singles match for the WWE Raw Women's Championship	11:25
5	Damian Priest (c) defeated Jeff Hardy and Sheamus by pinfall	Triple threat match for the WWE United States Championship	13:25
6	Becky Lynch (c) vs. Bianca Belair ended in a no contest	Singles match for the WWE SmackDown Women's Championship	17:25
7	Roman Reigns (c) (with Paul Heyman) defeated "The Demon" Finn Bálor by pinfall	Extreme Rules match for the WWE Universal Championship	19:45
(c) / – the champion(s) heading into the match; P / – the match was broadcast on the pre-show
