= Extreme Rules (2015) =

WWE pay-per-view and livestreaming event

- Promotional poster featuring John Cena
- Promotion: WWE
- Date: April 26, 2015
- City: Rosemont, Illinois
- Venue: Allstate Arena
- Attendance: 14,197
- Buy rate: 56,000 (excluding WWE Network views)

WWE event chronology
← Previous; WrestleMania 31	Next → King of the Ring

Extreme Rules chronology
← Previous; 2014	Next → 2016

The 2015 Extreme Rules was a professional wrestling pay-per-view (PPV) and livestreaming event produced by WWE. It was the seventh annual Extreme Rules event and took place on April 26, 2015, at the Allstate Arena in the Chicago suburb of Rosemont, Illinois, marking the second Extreme Rules event to take place at this venue after the 2012 edition. The theme of the event was that it featured various hardcore-based matches.

Eight matches were contested at the event, including one on the Kickoff pre-show. Four of the main card's matches were contested under a hardcore stipulation. In the main event, Seth Rollins defeated Randy Orton in a Steel Cage match to retain the WWE World Heavyweight Championship. In other prominent matches, Dean Ambrose defeated Luke Harper in a Chicago Street Fight, The New Day (Big E and Kofi Kingston) defeated Cesaro and Tyson Kidd to win the WWE Tag Team Championship, John Cena defeated Rusev in a Russian Chain match to retain the WWE United States Championship, and Roman Reigns defeated Big Show in a Last Man Standing match.

This was the third Extreme Rules event to not feature the titular Extreme Rules match, after the 2009 and 2011 events. The event was available on the WWE Network in over 140 countries. On pay-per-view, it had 56,000 buys (excluding WWE Network views), down from the previous year's 108,000 buys.

== Production ==
=== Background ===
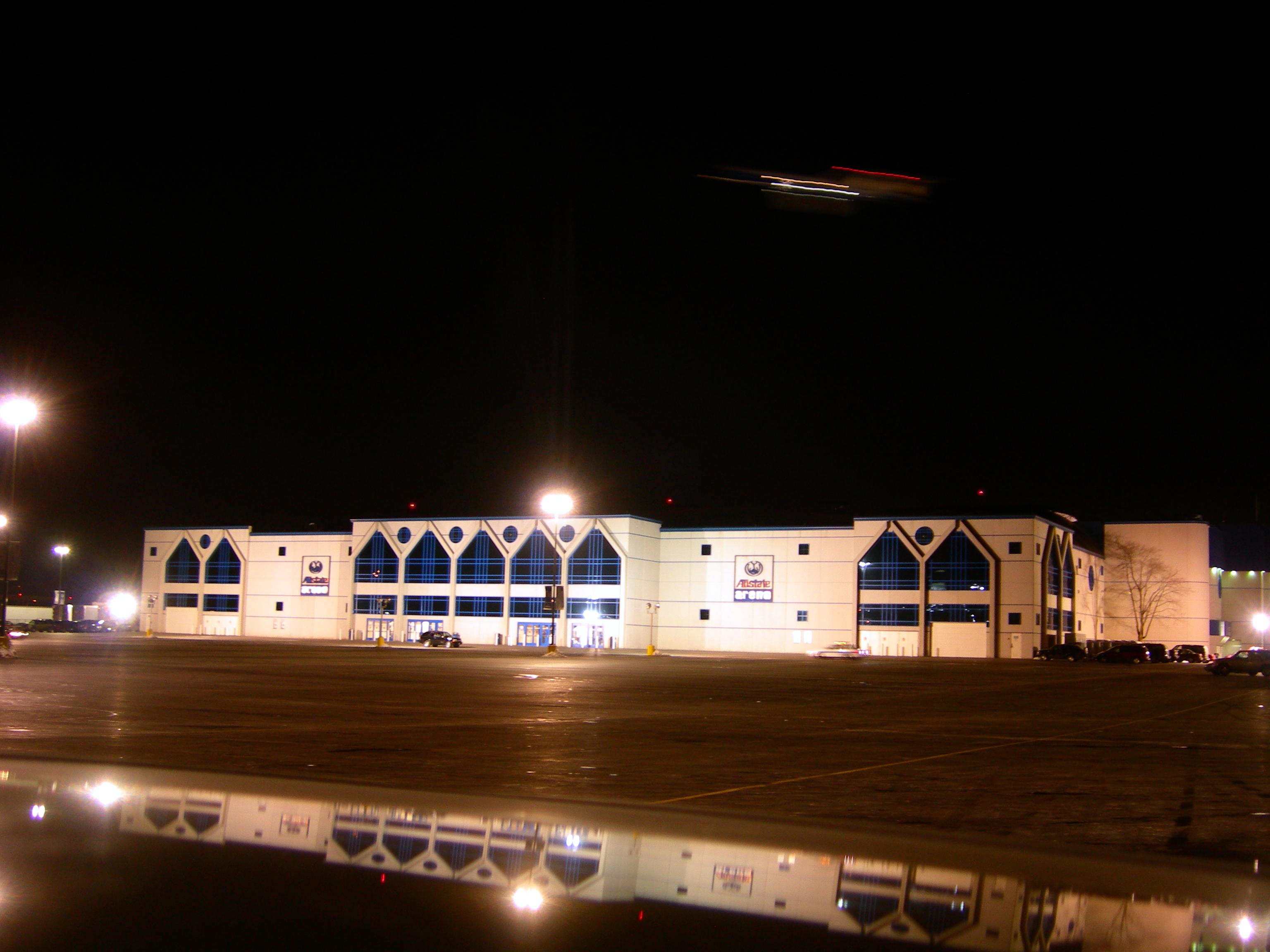
The seventh annual Extreme Rules was the second time for the event to be held at the Allstate Arena in the Chicago suburb of Rosemont, Illinois, after 2012.

Extreme Rules was an annual professional wrestling event produced by WWE since 2009. It was originally broadcast exclusively via pay-per-view (PPV) before it began simultaneously livestreaming on the WWE Network in 2014. The concept of the event was that it featured various matches that were contested under hardcore rules and generally featured one Extreme Rules match. The defunct Extreme Championship Wrestling promotion, which WWE acquired in 2003, originally used the "extreme rules" term to describe the regulations for all of its matches; WWE adopted the term, using it in place of "hardcore match" or "hardcore rules". The seventh Extreme Rules event took place on April 26, 2015, at the Allstate Arena in the Chicago suburb of Rosemont, Illinois, marking the second Extreme Rules event to take place at this venue, after the 2012 edition.

=== Storylines ===
The event comprised eight matches, including one on the Kickoff pre-show, that resulted from scripted storylines. Results were predetermined by WWE's writers, while storylines were produced on WWE's weekly television shows, Monday Night Raw and SmackDown.

At WrestleMania 31, John Cena defeated Rusev to win the United States Championship, marking Rusev's first defeat since appearing on WWE's main roster. On the April 2 episode of SmackDown, Rusev invoked his rematch clause to face Cena for the title at the event. On the April 13 episode of Raw, following Cena's title defense, Rusev attacked Cena with a chain and Lana revealed that the match between Cena and Rusev would be a Russian Chain match.

At WrestleMania 31, Bad News Barrett had lost his Intercontinental Championship in a seven-man ladder match. In the following week, Barrett repeatedly attacked the new champion, Daniel Bryan, during and after matches and invoked his rematch clause for Extreme Rules. However, when Bryan was declared unable to compete due to an injury, Barrett was instead given a match against Neville on the event's Kickoff pre-show.

At WrestleMania 31, Randy Orton defeated Seth Rollins. Later that night, Rollins cashed in his Money in the Bank contract during the scheduled WWE World Heavyweight Championship match between Brock Lesnar and Roman Reigns and pinned Reigns to win his first WWE World Heavyweight title. On the April 6 episode of Raw, Orton defeated Ryback and Reigns in a triple threat match to face Rollins for the title at the event. On the April 13 episode of Raw, Orton defeated Tyson Kidd and Cesaro in a handicap match to earn the right to choose a stipulation, while Rollins defeated Kane to also earn the right to choose a stipulation. Rollins chose to ban Orton's finisher, the RKO, while Orton made the match a Steel Cage match. On the April 20 episode of Raw, Triple H announced that Kane would be the gatekeeper to the cage for this match at the event.

After his return from injury, Sheamus repeatedly attacked Dolph Ziggler on Raw and on the April 16 episode of SmackDown, announced that he would face Ziggler in a Kiss Me Arse match at the event.

On the April 2 episode of SmackDown, Dean Ambrose fought Luke Harper to a no contest, after Harper powerbombed Ambrose through the announcers table. On the April 13 episode of Raw, Ambrose attacked Harper after Harper lost to Ryback by disqualification. On the April 20 episode, Ambrose and Harper once again fought to a no contest. Later that night, a Chicago Street Fight between Ambrose and Harper was scheduled for the event.

During several April episodes of Raw, Big Show made several attacks against Roman Reigns, including a chokeslam onto the roof of a taxicab, leading to a Last Man Standing match being set for Extreme Rules.

On the April 13 episode of Raw, Paige won a battle royal by last eliminating Naomi to earn a title shot against Divas Champion Nikki Bella at Extreme Rules. After the match, Naomi turned heel by attacking Paige, who suffered a storyline injury and was later deemed unable to compete at the event. Thus, Naomi replaced Paige as the title challenger for the pay-per-view event.

On the April 20 episode of Raw, The New Day (Kofi Kingston and Big E, with Xavier Woods) defeated The Lucha Dragons (Kalisto and Sin Cara) by countout to earn a WWE Tag Team Championship match against champions Tyson Kidd and Cesaro.

== Event ==
Other on-screen personnel
Role:	Name:
English commentators	Michael Cole
English commentators	Jerry Lawler
English commentators	John "Bradshaw" Layfield
Spanish commentators	Carlos Cabrera
Spanish commentators	Marcelo Rodriguez
Interviewer	Tom Phillips
Ring announcers	Eden Stiles
Ring announcers	JoJo
Referees	Mike Chioda
Referees	John Cone
Referees	Charles Robinson
Referees	Dan Engler
Referees	Jason Ayers
Referees	Drake Wuertz
Pre-show Panel	Renee Young
Pre-show Panel	Booker T
Pre-show Panel	Corey Graves
Pre-show Panel	Byron Saxton

=== Pre-show ===
With Daniel Bryan injured and unable to compete, Bad News Barrett faced Neville on the Extreme Rules Kickoff pre-show. Neville won the match after executing the Red Arrow on Barrett.

=== Preliminary matches ===
The first match was the Chicago Street Fight between Dean Ambrose and Luke Harper. After both of them brawled through the backstage area, Harper got into a car and was followed by Ambrose, and the two drove out of the arena. Due to the street fight stipulation meaning no count-outs, the match was deemed to be continuing as the event progressed.

Next was the Kiss Me Arse match between Dolph Ziggler and Sheamus. Ziggler won the match with a roll-up. After the match, Sheamus refused to kiss Ziggler's ass. Sheamus tried to escape through the audience, but was brought back by the referee. Sheamus then pretended to perform the deed, only to execute a low blow and a Brogue Kick on Ziggler. Sheamus then made Ziggler kiss his arse by rubbing his arse on Ziggler.

After that, Tyson Kidd and Cesaro defended the WWE Tag Team Championship against The New Day (Big E and Kofi Kingston). Kofi won the match for his team by pinning Cesaro with a roll-up, thus winning the WWE Tag Team Championship.

While The New Day were being interviewed following their win, both Ambrose and Harper pulled up in the car that they had left in earlier, continuing their street fight match as they made their way back to the ring. Ambrose would eventually win the match via pinfall after executing Dirty Deeds on Harper.

In the fourth match, John Cena defended his United States Championship against Rusev in a Russian Chain match. The ending of the match came when Cena performed an Attitude Adjustment on Rusev, while he touched the fourth corner after both men had touched all three corners.

Next, Naomi challenged Divas Champion Nikki Bella. The ending came when as the referee pulled Nikki away, Brie kicked Naomi. Nikki executed a Rack Attack on Naomi for the pinfall victory, thus retaining the title.

After that, Big Show took on Roman Reigns in a Last Man Standing match. During the match, Big Show executed a Chokeslam on Reigns through two tables on the outside, while Big Show also went through a table and was later speared through the barricade. After Reigns speared Big Show through the Barricade, Reigns speared Big Show through the Spanish announce table. The ending to the match came when Reigns overturned the English announce table, trapping Big Show underneath for the ten count.

Next, Bo Dallas came to the ring, mocking the Chicago crowd. He was interrupted by Ryback, who attacked him and then led the crowd in a "Feed me more!" chant to end the segment.

=== Main event ===
In the main event, Seth Rollins defended the WWE World Heavyweight Championship against Randy Orton in a Steel Cage match, with Orton's RKO finisher banned, while Kane was appointed as the gatekeeper in this match. Orton performed a pedigree on Rollins for a near-fall. Kane was responsible for opening the cage door. Midway through the match, Kane prevented Orton from leaving the cage, but was then accidentally hit by the cage door, which was kicked by Rollins. This caused Kane to enter the ring and chokeslam J&J Security (Jamie Noble and Joey Mercury), who tried to interfere, as well as both Orton and Rollins. Orton then attacked Kane with an RKO before Rollins executed an RKO on Orton as well. Rollins then escaped the cage to win the match and retain the title.

== Reception ==
Critical reception to the event was mixed. Nolan Howell of slam sports awarded the event 2 out of 5 stars, adding that it was "thoroughly average" and "a show worth missing".

Kenny Herzog of Rolling Stone praised the Last Man Standing match between Reigns and Big Show, calling it "thrilling" and "the match of the night". However he was critical of the show's production, the Cena-Rusev match and the steel cage main event, which he described as "inconclusive" and "lifeless".

== Aftermath ==
The following night on Raw, Randy Orton declared that he deserved another shot at the WWE World Heavyweight Championship due to the inconclusive manner in which his match with Rollins ended. Later, Roman Reigns said that he deserved a title shot since he defeated The Big Show. Kane, acting on behalf of The Authority, allowed viewers to vote on who Rollins would face at Payback; WWE's fans voted for Rollins to defend in a triple threat. On the May 4 episode of Raw, Dean Ambrose defeated Rollins to gain entry into the match, making it a fatal four-way.

On the April 30 episode of SmackDown, Cesaro and Tyson Kidd won their rematch for the Tag Team Championship, but by disqualification, hence The New Day retained the titles.

On the May 11 episode of Raw, Daniel Bryan announced that he had an MRI on his shoulder and was told by doctors that there was no timetable for when he would be able to return to the ring. Due to this, he decided to relinquish the Intercontinental Championship. On February 8, 2016, Bryan announced his retirement from in-ring competition for medical reasons.

This was the last Extreme Rules event to feature the WWE Divas Championship as it was retired and replaced by a new WWE Women's Championship during the WrestleMania 32 pre-show in April 2016.

== Results ==
No.	Results	Stipulations	Times
1^{P}	Neville defeated Bad News Barrett by pinfall	Singles match	10:36
2	Dean Ambrose defeated Luke Harper by pinfall	Chicago Street Fight (Note: Ambrose and Harper left the arena during the match, with the next two matches starting and ending before Ambrose and Harper returned to the ring to finish their match.)	56:10
3	Dolph Ziggler defeated Sheamus by pinfall	Kiss Me Arse match (Note: Sheamus refused to fulfill the stipulation, and instead made Ziggler kiss his arse.)	9:16
4	The New Day (Big E and Kofi Kingston) (with Xavier Woods) defeated Tyson Kidd and Cesaro (c) (with Natalya) by pinfall	Tag team match for the WWE Tag Team Championship	9:47
5	John Cena (c) defeated Rusev (with Lana)	Russian Chain match for the WWE United States Championship	13:35
6	Nikki Bella (c) (with Brie Bella) defeated Naomi by pinfall	Singles match for the WWE Divas Championship	8:10
7	Roman Reigns defeated Big Show	Last Man Standing match	19:56
8	Seth Rollins (c) defeated Randy Orton by escaping the cage	Steel Cage match for the WWE World Heavyweight Championship; Orton's finisher, the RKO, was banned, and Kane served as the gatekeeper.	21:02
(c) / – the champion(s) heading into the match; P / – the match was broadcast on the pre-show
