= Extreme Rules (2016) =

WWE pay-per-view and livestreaming event

- Promotional poster featuring Dean Ambrose
- Promotion: WWE
- Date: May 22, 2016
- City: Newark, New Jersey
- Venue: Prudential Center
- Attendance: 15,963
- Tagline: There Are No Rules. Extreme Rules.

WWE event chronology
← Previous; Payback	Next → NXT TakeOver: The End

Extreme Rules chronology
← Previous; 2015	Next → 2017

The 2016 Extreme Rules was a professional wrestling pay-per-view (PPV) and livestreaming event produced by WWE. It was the eighth annual Extreme Rules event and took place on May 22, 2016, at the Prudential Center in Newark, New Jersey. The theme of the event was that it featured various hardcore-based matches.

Eight matches were contested at the event, including one on the Kickoff pre-show. Only three matches, including the pre-show match, were contested under a hardcore stipulation. In the main event, Roman Reigns defeated AJ Styles in an Extreme Rules match to retain the WWE World Heavyweight Championship; after the match, Seth Rollins made his return from injury and attacked Reigns.

The event received mixed-to-positive reviews from critics, with praise directed at the fatal four-way match for the Intercontinental Championship and the main event match. The event was originally scheduled to be held on May 1, 2016, at the Allstate Arena in the Chicago suburb of Rosemont, Illinois, which would have been the third Extreme Rules at the venue, after 2012 and 2015, but WWE switched its date and venue with that year's Payback. This was the last Extreme Rules event to be held before the reintroduction of the brand extension in July.

== Production ==
=== Background ===
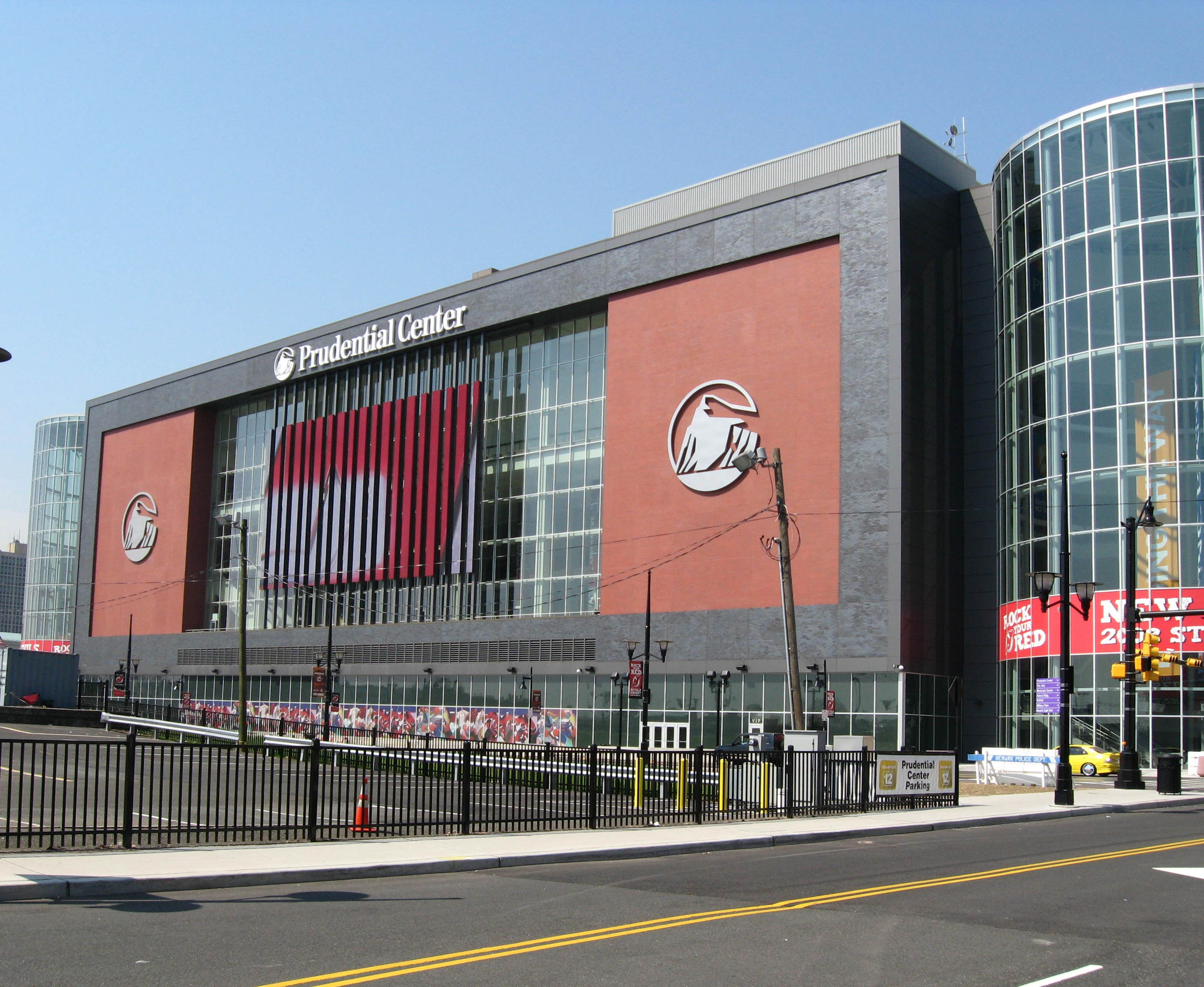
The eighth annual Extreme Rules event was held at the Prudential Center in Newark, New Jersey.

Extreme Rules was an annual professional wrestling event produced by WWE since 2009. It was originally broadcast exclusively via pay-per-view (PPV) before it began simultaneously livestreaming on the WWE Network in 2014. The concept of the event was that it featured various matches that were contested under hardcore rules and generally featured one Extreme Rules match. The defunct Extreme Championship Wrestling promotion, which WWE acquired in 2003, originally used the "extreme rules" term to describe the regulations for all of its matches; WWE adopted the term, using it in place of "hardcore match" or "hardcore rules".

The eighth Extreme Rules event was originally scheduled for May 1, 2016, at the Allstate Arena in the Chicago suburb of Rosemont, Illinois, which would have been the third Extreme Rules held there, after 2012 and 2015; however, on February 23, WWE announced that it switched its date and venue with that year's Payback. As a result, Extreme Rules instead took place on May 22, 2016, at the Prudential Center in Newark, New Jersey. Tickets went on sale on February 26 through Ticketmaster.

=== Storylines ===
The event comprised eight matches, including one on the Kickoff pre-show, which resulted from scripted storylines. Results were predetermined by WWE's writers, while storylines were produced on WWE's weekly television shows, Monday Night Raw and SmackDown.

On the first post-WrestleMania Raw on April 4, AJ Styles won a four-way match for a shot at the WWE World Heavyweight Championship held by Roman Reigns and retained his title opportunity by defeating Sami Zayn on the next Raw. On the April 25 episode of Raw, Styles saved Reigns from an attack by Karl Anderson and Luke Gallows, but Reigns then attacked Styles. At Payback, Styles faced Reigns for the world title. Reigns was first counted out and then disqualified, but the match was restarted twice (first by Shane McMahon and then Stephanie McMahon), turning into a no disqualification match. After interferences by both Anderson and Gallows and the Usos, Reigns eventually pinned Styles to retain the title. Subsequently, Vince, Shane, and Stephanie McMahon agreed that Styles should get a title rematch at Extreme Rules in an Extreme Rules match. After Styles, Anderson and Gallows beat Reigns and the Usos on the May 2 episode of Raw, Anderson and Gallows wanted Styles to hit Reigns with a chair but Styles refused. When the Usos attacked Styles from behind with a chair, Styles retaliated with the chair. Ultimately, Reigns powerbombed Styles through the broadcast table.

The tag team tournament to determine the #1 contender match for the WWE Tag Team Championship culminated at Payback, in a match pitting The Vaudevillains (Aiden English and Simon Gotch) against Enzo Amore and Colin Cassady, which ended in a no contest after Enzo Amore suffered a legit concussion. On the following night on Raw, The Vaudevillains were awarded a title match against WWE Tag Team Champions The New Day (Kofi Kingston, Big E, and Xavier Woods) at Extreme Rules.

At Payback, WWE Women's Champion Charlotte defeated Natalya in controversial fashion; when Charlotte had her opponent in the Sharpshooter, referee Charles Robinson awarded the match to Charlotte despite Natalya not having submitted, similar to the Montreal Screwjob at the 1997 Survivor Series. On the following night on Raw, a submission match between Charlotte and Natalya was scheduled for Extreme Rules; Ric Flair was banned from ringside, with the added stipulation any appearance by Flair would result in Charlotte losing the title.

On the May 2 episode of Raw, Rusev won a battle royal, last eliminating Zack Ryder, to earn a title match against United States Champion Kalisto at Extreme Rules.

At WrestleMania 32, Kevin Owens lost the Intercontinental Championship to Zack Ryder in a seven-man ladder match that also included Sami Zayn and The Miz. The next night on Raw, The Miz won the Intercontinental Championship after his wife Maryse distracted Ryder. On the April 11 episode of Raw, Owens interrupted Shane McMahon and demanded a title shot, but Shane instead booked him in a #1 contender match against Cesaro, which Cesaro won. At Payback, Owens defeated Zayn, and then stayed for commentary during the Intercontinental Championship match; Zayn attacked Owens and a fight broke between the two. While Owens and Zayn were fighting at the ropes, Cesaro tried to throw them, but Miz pinned him to retain the title. Then Owens, Miz, Cesaro and Zayn began a brawl with Owens standing tall at the end holding the championship. The next night on Raw, another #1 contender match between Owens and Cesaro occurred, but the match ended with no contest after Miz, who was on commentary, attacked Cesaro. Zayn then ran down to the ring and the fight ended with Zayn standing tall holding the championship. On the May 5 episode of SmackDown, Miz interrupted Zayn on The Highlight Reel and a match was booked later between the two, which Zayn won after Owens interfered. Cesaro ran down to the ring and a fight between the four ensued, which ended with Cesaro holding the championship. On the May 9 episode of Raw, Shane and Stephanie McMahon scheduled a triple threat title match at Extreme Rules between Owens, Miz and Cesaro. Zayn demanded to be inserted into the match as well, and defeated Miz later in the night to win contendership, thus turning the match into a fatal four way.

At Payback, Dean Ambrose defeated Chris Jericho. On the next night on Raw, during a segment of The Ambrose Asylum with Stephanie McMahon, Stephanie cancelled Ambrose Asylum and reinstated Jericho's talk show, The Highlight Reel. Jericho came out and attacked Ambrose, destroying Mitch the Potted Plant in the process. The following week on Raw, Ambrose attacked Jericho and destroyed Jericho's jacket. On the May 12 episode of SmackDown, Jericho attacked Ambrose and put the straitjacket on Ambrose. On the May 16 episode of Raw, Ambrose challenged Jericho to a match at Extreme Rules, which Jericho accepted. Ambrose then revealed that their match would be an Asylum match, a steel cage match with weapons hanging above the cage.

Baron Corbin's first WWE singles match on the first Raw after WrestleMania ended in a double countout against Dolph Ziggler. Ziggler then defeated Corbin on the Payback Kickoff pre-show. On the May 9 episode of Raw, Corbin defeated Ziggler. The following week, a No Disqualification match between the two was scheduled for the Extreme Rules Kickoff pre-show.

On the April 11 episode of Raw, Karl Anderson debuted in and Luke Gallows returned to WWE by attacking The Usos (Jey Uso and Jimmy Uso). On the April 25 episode of Raw, Anderson and Gallows defeated The Usos. The following weeks after Payback, the two teams faced each other in tag team matches with Reigns and Styles in the mix. On the May 19 episode of SmackDown, a tornado tag team match was scheduled for the two teams at Extreme Rules.

== Event ==
Other on-screen personnel
Role:	Name:
English commentators	Michael Cole (Main show)
English commentators	John "Bradshaw" Layfield (Main show)
English commentators	Byron Saxton (All matches)
English commentators	Mauro Ranallo (Pre-show)
Spanish commentators	Carlos Cabrera
Spanish commentators	Marcelo Rodríguez
German commentators	Carsten Schaefer
German commentators	Sebastian Hackl
Ring announcers	Lilian Garcia
Ring announcers	Eden Stiles
Referees	John Cone
Referees	Dan Engler
Referees	Mike Chioda
Referees	Rod Zapata
Referees	Darrick Moore
Referees	Ryan Tran
Backstage interviewer	JoJo
Pre-show panel	Renee Young
Pre-show panel	Corey Graves
Pre-show panel	Booker T
Pre-show panel	Jerry Lawler

=== Pre-show ===
During the Extreme Rules Kickoff pre-show, The Dudley Boyz (Bubba Ray Dudley and D-Von Dudley) cut a promo in the ring, but were interrupted by Colin Cassady. The Dudleyz tried to beat Cassady down when he confronted them, but he eventually overpowered the two. Later on, Baron Corbin faced Dolph Ziggler in a no disqualification match. In the end, Corbin performed a low blow on Ziggler and followed up with an End of Days to win the match.

=== Preliminary matches ===
The event opened with Luke Gallows and Karl Anderson facing The Usos (Jey Uso and Jimmy Uso) in a tornado tag team match. The match ended when Gallows and Anderson executed the Magic Killer on Jimmy Uso for the win.

Next, Kalisto defended the United States Championship against Rusev. Rusev forced Kalisto to submit to the Accolade to win the title.

After that, The New Day (Big E and Xavier Woods) defended the WWE Tag Team Championship against The Vaudevillains (Aiden English and Simon Gotch). The referee missed non-participant Kofi Kingston interfering by executing Trouble in Paradise on Gotch, which led to Woods executing a Shining Wizard on Gotch for the pinfall.

In the fourth match, The Miz defended the Intercontinental Championship in a Fatal Four-Way match against Cesaro, Kevin Owens, and Sami Zayn. The match started with Zayn immediately executing a Helluva Kick on Owens. In the middle of the match, Miz executed the Skull Crushing Finale on Cesaro for a near-fall. Cesaro applied the Sharpshooter on Miz, who submitted, but the referee did not see it as he was distracted by Maryse. Cesaro performed a Neutralizer on Owens, but Zayn broke up the pin. Owens performed a Pop-Up Powerbomb on Cesaro, but Miz broke up the pin and executed a Skull Crushing Finale on Owens outside the ring, and covered Cesaro which scored a near-fall. In the climax, Zayn executed a Helluva Kick on Cesaro, but Owens pulled Zayn out of the ring to break the pin. As Owens and Zayn brawled at ringside, Miz pinned Cesaro to retain the title.

Next, Dean Ambrose faced Chris Jericho in the first-ever Asylum match. After Ambrose kicked out of a Codebreaker, he countered a second Codebreaker by dropping Jericho onto the thumbtacks, then followed up with "Dirty Deeds" onto the thumbtacks for the win.

In the sixth match, Charlotte defended the WWE Women's Championship against Natalya in a submission match. The match stipulation was that Ric Flair was banned from ringside and that if he appeared at ringside, Charlotte would have lost the title. The end of the match saw Natalya applying the Sharpshooter, when Ric Flair's music played and a figure resembling Flair appeared in the aisle. The figure turned out to be Dana Brooke masquerading as Ric Flair. A distracted Natalya broke the hold and was attacked by Charlotte, who applied the Figure Eight Leglock to retain the title.

=== Main event ===
In the main event, Roman Reigns faced AJ Styles in an Extreme Rules Match for the WWE World Heavyweight Championship. In the first half of the match, Styles and Reigns brawled around the arena: Reigns suffered a Phenomenal Forearm from the pre-show table, while Styles suffered a back body drop through a broadcast table. Despite Styles attacking Reigns's knee mid-way in the match, he was able to powerbomb Styles through another broadcast table, counter Styles' Phenomenal Forearm with a "Superman Punch", and finally spear Styles at ringside. After that, Karl Anderson and Luke Gallows gave Reigns a Boot of Doom and helped Styles cover Reigns, but Reigns kicked out. The Usos then interfered, with Superkicks and a Samoan Splash on Styles, who kicked out of a pin attempt by Reigns.

In the last two minutes of the match, Reigns kicked out of a Styles Clash, then Styles gave Reigns a second Styles Clash onto a chair. Styles covered Reigns after fighting off one of the Usos, but Reigns kicked out again. Styles then grabbed the chair and attacked Reigns and the Usos with it multiple times. Styles attempted a Phenomenal Forearm, only for Reigns to spear him in mid-air to retain the title. After the match, Seth Rollins made a surprise return and attacked Reigns with a Pedigree. Rollins then hoisted the title over Reigns to end the broadcast.

== Reception ==
Critics gave a mixed-to-positive reception to the show, generally praising firstly the Intercontinental Championship four-way and secondly the main event WWE World Heavyweight Championship match and its post-match happenings, but the rest of the show was not as well received. The high amount of punishment AJ Styles received during the main event was also highlighted.

James Caldwell of Pro Wrestling Torch said that it was "unfortunate there were so many finisher kick-outs on this show, but that seems to be the trend these days". Caldwell rated the four-way match the best of the show at 4.5 stars out of 5, commenting that "strong build-up" resulted in a "strong title match", with further positives including that the "Owens-Zayn feud was enhanced, Cesaro's amazing in-ring skills were captured, and Miz's post-Mania resurgence continued". The next-best rated match was the main event at 3.75 stars: a "very physical, PPV main event-worthy battle continuing to build up Styles's strong first year in WWE. Reigns plays the part well of a PPV main-eventer when matched up with the right opponent, like Styles, but not someone like Sheamus." Also, Styles took a "crazy amount of punishment" during the match. The rest of the matches of the event were less well received, being rated either 2.25 or 2.5 stars. Corbin's pre-show performance showed he had "a lot of work to do to belong" on the main roster; the Tornado tag match was rushed and "disorganized"; Rusev winning the U.S. Championship was a positive; the tag title match was mostly a "basic TV-quality action" except for a "good nearfall for The Vaudevillains"; while the Asylum match had a "good" finish, but was dragged down by "an overly-gimmicky WWE cage match concept" and the "middle portion [being] a big struggle trying to follow the four-way".

Jack de Menezes of The Independent praised the Intercontinental title match, the main event and Seth Rollins' return, but "elsewhere there was little to shout about, with matches either ending too short or lacking the thrills that ended the night". The review deemed the four-way as "one of the matches of the year" that highlighted the Miz as a "crafty champion" with "all his underhand tactics" en route to retaining the title, as well as the "hatred that remains between Zayn and Owens". The main event was deemed "brilliant" and an "epic battle", leading to the show ending with Rollins' "long-awaited return" as the crowd erupted into cheers - this was contrasted with Reigns' "frosty reception". The Asylum "match slowed down too often whenever either man tried to get a new weapon", with de Menezes hoping Jericho and Ambrose's "drawn out rivalry" ended at Extreme Rules. For the tag title match, the Vaudevillains "put in their best performance to date since moving up to the main roster". Finally, Rusev, Anderson and Gallows dominated their respective matches, while Baron Corbin provided "a show of brute strength and craftiness".

Dave Meltzer of the Wrestling Observer wrote that the Intercontinental title match "tore down the house" as a "super match with tons of near falls and saves", and "Cesaro and Zayn in particular were great." The main event was "another super match", as "Styles had a death wish taking some crazy and I mean crazy bumps including a high backdrop through a table where he landed on his tailbone". Then, the "crowd went totally nuts for [Rollins] as a babyface" in the post-match segment. Kalisto-Rusev was "good", with WWE "pushing like Kalisto was injured at the end, and was coming into the match injured". The women's match was poorer than Payback's and meant to "elevate Dana Brooke", with Meltzer feeling that the long-term plan is "putting Charlotte and Dana Brooke into a duo to eventually set them up as rivals". The tag matches were both "short", the first match seeing the crowd support going to Anderson and Gallows instead of the Usos. The short matches led to a "weird match" that was "just too long" between Ambrose and Jericho. The Asylum match "didn't have much heat for a long time" and was "hurt following such a great" four-way. However, Ambrose and Jericho did "pick it up at the end", with Jericho "selling [the thumbtacks] tremendously" for the finish.

Kenny Herzog of Rolling Stone criticized Extreme Rules as most of its match "outcomes were far from shocking"; also, it had a "dated" title and for "its namesake stipulation" failed to "really lord its influence over the card". Herzog highlighted the Asylum match as a "prop-comedy disaster" that was "unsurprisingly, utterly inane", but it was "Jericho, tacks and all, who rescued this clunker from meaninglessness by giving it his unquestioned all". Meanwhile, Herzog could not understand "WWE's insistence on shading Ambrose as more goofy than gritty". Another disappointment was the women's match for having a "bizarre, forced finish", as Brooke's "arbitrary shift in allegiances rings pretty hollow". Herzog also hoped that Natalya would not fade into "irrelevance after helping carry the post-WrestleMania malaise". Meanwhile, the finish of the tag title match was "a bit cockamamie, and the opening tornado-rules contest was ho-hum". Herzog still found positives in the show: the four-way was "perfect" with a "multitude of near-falls and clever finish" while everyone gave their "best". Also, AJ Styles, "more than any other latter-career migrant to Vince McMahon's big top, has expeditiously qualified himself as a main-eventer", having displayed "world-class" skills in the ring and taken "some Hall of Fame bumps". Then, the "rousing return" at the end of the show resulted in "the torch of Heavyweight was cannily passed from super-sub A.J. to present- and future-stud Seth Rollins".

== Aftermath ==
Having returned from injury, Seth Rollins set his sights on regaining the WWE World Heavyweight Championship. After a small confrontation with Roman Reigns on Raw, Shane McMahon scheduled a title match between Reigns and Rollins for Money in the Bank.

A night after failing to win the WWE World Heavyweight Championship, AJ Styles on Raw split from Luke Gallows and Karl Anderson, which they did not take with appreciation, and later failed to qualify in the Money in the Bank ladder match by losing to Kevin Owens. A week later, on the May 30 episode of Raw, Styles welcomed back the returning John Cena when Gallows and Anderson appeared to challenge the two to a fight. Styles surprised Cena by joining Gallows and Anderson in their attack, turning Styles heel. This led to a match between Styles and Cena at Money in the Bank, with Gallows and Anderson banned from ringside.

The 2016 Extreme Rules was the last Extreme Rules held before the reintroduction of the brand extension in July, where WWE again split their roster between the Raw and SmackDown brands, where wrestlers were exclusively assigned to perform. The 2017 event was in turn held exclusively for the Raw brand.

== Results ==
No.	Results	Stipulations	Times
1^{P}	Baron Corbin defeated Dolph Ziggler by pinfall	No Disqualification match	7:07
2	Gallows and Anderson defeated The Usos (Jey Uso and Jimmy Uso)	Tornado tag team match	8:37
3	Rusev (with Lana) defeated Kalisto (c) by submission	Singles match for the WWE United States Championship	9:31
4	The New Day (Big E and Xavier Woods) (c) (with Kofi Kingston) defeated The Vaudevillains (Aiden English and Simon Gotch) by pinfall	Tag team match for the WWE Tag Team Championship	6:20
5	The Miz (c) (with Maryse) defeated Cesaro, Kevin Owens, and Sami Zayn by pinfall	Fatal four-way match for the WWE Intercontinental Championship	19:32
6	Dean Ambrose defeated Chris Jericho by pinfall	Asylum match	26:41
7	Charlotte (c) defeated Natalya	Submission match for the WWE Women's Championship; Ric Flair was banned from ringside and had he disregarded his ban, Charlotte would have lost her title.	9:30
8	Roman Reigns (c) defeated AJ Styles by pinfall	Extreme Rules match for the WWE World Heavyweight Championship	22:13
(c) / – the champion(s) heading into the match; P / – the match was broadcast on the pre-show
