= WWE Extreme Rules =

WWE pay-per-view and livestreaming event series

- WWE Extreme Rules logo
- Promotion: WWE
- Brands: Raw (2009–2011, 2017–2022); SmackDown (2009–2011, 2018–2022); 205 Live (2019); ECW (2009)
- Other name: The Horror Show at Extreme Rules (2020)
- First event: 2009
- Last event: 2022
- Event gimmick: Hardcore wrestling
- Signature match: Extreme Rules match

WWE Extreme Rules was an annual professional wrestling event produced by WWE, a Connecticut-based promotion. It was broadcast live and available only through pay-per-view (PPV) and WWE's livestreaming services. The name of the event stemmed from various matches on the card being contested under hardcore wrestling regulations with generally one match being an Extreme Rules match, which was introduced at the 2010 event. The defunct Extreme Championship Wrestling promotion, which WWE acquired in 2003, originally used the "extreme rules" term to describe the regulations for all of its matches.

The event name was established in 2009; however, its theme began with its predecessor, One Night Stand, which was promoted in 2005 and 2006 as an Extreme Championship Wrestling reunion show. In 2007, WWE promoted the show as one of its own regular PPV events but kept the concept of hardcore-based matches. In 2009, WWE renamed One Night Stand as Extreme Rules. The 2009 Extreme Rules event was noted by WWE to be a direct continuation of the One Night Stand chronology; however, the 2010 event was later promoted as only the second event under a new chronology, one that was no longer a direct continuation of the One Night Stand events.

Starting in 2010, Extreme Rules was moved from June to late April/early May to replace Backlash as the post-WrestleMania PPV event. For 2013, the event replaced Over the Limit as that year's May PPV. After the reinstated brand extension took effect in mid-2016, the event returned to the June slot of WWE's PPV calendar in 2017 and was held as a Raw-exclusive event. Following WrestleMania 34 in 2018, however, WWE discontinued brand-exclusive PPVs, and Extreme Rules moved to the July slot. For the 2020 edition only, the event was titled The Horror Show at Extreme Rules. The 2021 event was then moved to September, replacing Clash of Champions. The 2022 event was then moved to October, which was the only time the event was held on a Saturday. It would also be the final Extreme Rules as it was replaced by the reinstated Fastlane in 2023 due to the reduction of gimmick events (outside of Royal Rumble, Elimination Chamber, Survivor Series, and Money in the Bank.)

== Concept and History ==
From 2005 to 2008, World Wrestling Entertainment (WWE) ran a pay-per-view (PPV) event entitled One Night Stand. While originally a reunion show for the defunct Extreme Championship Wrestling promotion, the assets of which WWE acquired in 2003, the concept of One Night Stand was that the event featured various matches that were contested under hardcore rules. In 2009, Extreme Rules was established to replace One Night Stand and was initially noted by WWE to be a direct continuation of the One Night Stand chronology, with Extreme Rules continuing the concept of featuring hardcore-based matches. However, the 2010 event was later promoted as only the second event under a new chronology, one that was no longer a direct continuation of the One Night Stand events. The term "extreme rules" was originally used by Extreme Championship Wrestling to describe the regulations for all of its matches; WWE adopted the term, using it in place of "hardcore match" or "hardcore rules". In the mid-to-late 2010s, the number of hardcore-based matches began decreasing, with only one included at the 2021 event, however, the 2022 event returned to form with all six of its matches contested under hardcore stipulations.

The 2009 Extreme Rules pay-per-view was the inaugural event of what became an annual gimmick event for WWE. It was held on June 7, 2009, at the New Orleans Arena in New Orleans, Louisiana. To coincide with the brand extension, in which the roster was divided into brands where wrestlers exclusively performed, the inaugural event featured wrestlers from the Raw, SmackDown, and ECW brands—it was the only to feature ECW as the brand disbanded in February 2010. The 2010 event then introduced the titular Extreme Rules match. This year's event also moved Extreme Rules up to the late April/early May slot to replace Backlash as the post-WrestleMania pay-per-view event.

In April 2011, WWE ceased using its full name with the "WWE" abbreviation becoming an orphaned initialism, and in August, the first brand extension was dissolved. The 2013 event then replaced Over the Limit for that year's May PPV. Beginning with the 2014 event, in addition to traditional PPV, Extreme Rules began broadcasting on WWE's online streaming service, the WWE Network, which launched earlier that year in February. After the 2016 event, WWE reintroduced the brand extension in July. Along with this second brand split came brand-exclusive PPVs, thus the 2017 event featured wrestlers exclusively from the Raw brand. It would in turn be the only Extreme Rules event during the second brand split to be a brand-exclusive show, as following WrestleMania 34 the following year, brand-exclusive pay-per-views were discontinued. The 2017 event also moved Extreme Rules back to the June slot, however, the 2018 event moved Extreme Rules to July. The 2019 event was held at the Wells Fargo Center in Philadelphia, Pennsylvania, the city that was the home of Extreme Championship Wrestling from 1993 to 2001.

Due to the COVID-19 pandemic, which began affecting the industry in mid-March 2020, WWE had to relocate its programming to a behind closed doors set. Raw and SmackDown's shows were moved to the WWE Performance Center in Orlando, Florida, with no fans in attendance, although in late May, the promotion began using Performance Center trainees to serve as the live audience, which was further expanded to friends and family members of the wrestlers in mid-June. With the change in location and format, WWE titled the 2020 event as The Horror Show at Extreme Rules. It featured horror-themed matches, including the main event, which was a cinematically produced match, a Wyatt Swamp Fight between Bray Wyatt and Braun Strowman, a hardcore match held at a swamp.

The SAP Center in San Jose, California was originally to host the 2020 event, but due to the event's relocation as a result of the COVID-19 pandemic, the SAP Center announced that they would instead host the 2021 event. However, due to the ongoing pandemic, the 2021 event was reported to be broadcast from WWE's bio-secure bubble, the WWE ThunderDome (introduced in August 2020), but that July date was instead given to Money in the Bank after WWE announced they would be returning to live touring in mid-July. It was then announced that the 2021 edition, which returned to the event's original name, would instead take place on September 26 at the Nationwide Arena in Columbus, Ohio, replacing Clash of Champions, which had originally been scheduled for that date and venue. The 2021 event was also the first Extreme Rules to air on Peacock's WWE Network channel, following the merger of the American version of the WWE Network under Peacock in March that year.

In June 2022, WWE announced that the 2022 Extreme Rules would be held on October 8 and return the event to the Wells Fargo Center in Philadelphia, Pennsylvania. This marked the first Extreme Rules to be held in October and on a Saturday. The 2022 event would be the final Extreme Rules event, as an event was not scheduled for 2023, with that year's October slot given to a reinstated Fastlane. This came after WWE Chief Content Officer Triple H stated that he wanted to discontinue some of the gimmick events.

== Extreme Rules matches ==
An "Extreme Rules match" is a type of hardcore match in which there are no disqualifications and no countouts and weapons are incentivized, but pinfalls and submissions must take place in the ring; since the acquisition of Extreme Championship Wrestling, WWE has used the "Extreme Rules" term in place of "hardcore". Although the Extreme Rules event was established in 2009, it was not until 2010 when the Extreme Rules match began to be held at the titular event. Only two other Extreme Rules events did not include the namesake match, which were the 2011 and 2015 events.

After being introduced at the 2010 event, the events that included an Extreme Rules match only had one such match on the card. The other matches were another type of hardcore match or just standard rules matches. Some of the other hardcore matches may have technically had the same or very similar rules as an Extreme Rules match, but were not stipulated as such (for example, a No Holds Barred match, which was held at the inaugural 2009 event). Some Extreme Rules matches had other stipulations applied on top of the Extreme Rules stipulation.

Other types of hardcore matches that took place at Extreme Rules include Steel Cage matches, variants of the Strap match, Ladder matches, Street Fights, Last Man Standing matches, tables matches, "I Quit" matches, No Disqualification matches, a Kendo stick-on-a-Pole match, an Eye for an Eye match (one opponent had to extract an eye from the other opponent), a Wyatt Swamp Fight (a hardcore match held at a swamp), a Good Old Fashioned Donnybrook match, and a Fight Pit match.

The following are the Extreme Rules matches that were held at the titular event.

#	Year	Extreme Rules match	Ref.
1	2010	Jack Swagger (c) vs. Randy Orton for the World Heavyweight Championship	
2	2012	John Cena vs. Brock Lesnar	
3	2013	Randy Orton vs. Big Show	
4	2014	Daniel Bryan (c) vs. Kane for the WWE World Heavyweight Championship	
5	2016	Roman Reigns (c) vs. AJ Styles for the WWE World Heavyweight Championship	
6	2017	Samoa Joe vs. Roman Reigns vs. Seth Rollins vs. Finn Bálor vs. Bray Wyatt for a WWE Universal Championship match at Great Balls of Fire	
7	2018	Alexa Bliss (c) vs. Nia Jax for the WWE Raw Women's Championship	
8	2019	Seth Rollins (c) and Becky Lynch (c) vs. Baron Corbin and Lacey Evans for the WWE Universal Championship and WWE Raw Women's Championship; In addition to the Extreme Rules stipulation, this was a Last Chance Winners Take All mixed tag team match.	
9	2020	Drew McIntyre (c) vs. Dolph Ziggler for the WWE Championship; The Extreme Rules stipulation only applied to Ziggler; McIntyre had to wrestle under regular singles match rules. Additionally, had McIntyre been counted out of disqualified, he would've lost the title.	
10	2021	Roman Reigns (c) vs. "The Demon" Finn Bálor for the WWE Universal Championship	
11	2022	Liv Morgan (c) vs. Ronda Rousey for the WWE SmackDown Women's Championship	

== Events ==
Raw-branded event

#	Event	Date	City	Venue	Main event	Ref.
1	Extreme Rules (2009)	June 7, 2009	New Orleans, Louisiana	New Orleans Arena	Edge (c) vs. Jeff Hardy in a Ladder match for the World Heavyweight Championship then Jeff Hardy (c) vs. CM Punk for the World Heavyweight Championship in Punk's Money in the Bank cash-in match	
2	Extreme Rules (2010)	April 25, 2010	Baltimore, Maryland	1st Mariner Arena	John Cena (c) vs. Batista in a Last Man Standing match for the WWE Championship	
3	Extreme Rules (2011)	May 1, 2011	Tampa, Florida	St. Pete Times Forum	The Miz (c) vs. John Cena vs. John Morrison in a Triple Threat Steel Cage match for the WWE Championship	
4	Extreme Rules (2012)	April 29, 2012	Rosemont, Illinois	Allstate Arena	Brock Lesnar vs. John Cena in an Extreme Rules match	
5	Extreme Rules (2013)	May 19, 2013	St. Louis, Missouri	Scottrade Center	Brock Lesnar vs. Triple H in a Steel Cage match	
6	Extreme Rules (2014)	May 4, 2014	East Rutherford, New Jersey	Izod Center	Daniel Bryan (c) vs. Kane in an Extreme Rules match for the WWE World Heavyweight Championship	
7	Extreme Rules (2015)	April 26, 2015	Rosemont, Illinois	Allstate Arena	Seth Rollins (c) vs. Randy Orton in a Steel Cage match for the WWE World Heavyweight Championship	
8	Extreme Rules (2016)	May 22, 2016	Newark, New Jersey	Prudential Center	Roman Reigns (c) vs. AJ Styles in an Extreme Rules match for the WWE World Heavyweight Championship	
9	Extreme Rules (2017)	June 4, 2017	Baltimore, Maryland	Royal Farms Arena	Bray Wyatt vs. Finn Bálor vs. Roman Reigns vs. Samoa Joe vs. Seth Rollins in a Fatal Five-way Extreme Rules match for a WWE Universal Championship match at Great Balls of Fire	
10	Extreme Rules (2018)	July 15, 2018	Pittsburgh, Pennsylvania	PPG Paints Arena	Dolph Ziggler (c) vs. Seth Rollins in a 30-minute Iron Man match for the WWE Intercontinental Championship	
11	Extreme Rules (2019)	July 14, 2019	Philadelphia, Pennsylvania	Wells Fargo Center	Seth Rollins (c) and Becky Lynch (c) vs. Baron Corbin and Lacey Evans in a Last Chance Winners Take All Extreme Rules mixed tag team match for the WWE Universal Championship and WWE Raw Women's Championship then Seth Rollins (c) vs. Brock Lesnar for the WWE Universal Championship in Lesnar's Money in the Bank cash-in match	
12	The Horror Show at Extreme Rules	July 19, 2020	Orlando, Florida	WWE Performance Center^{1}	Braun Strowman vs. Bray Wyatt in a Wyatt Swamp Fight	
13	Extreme Rules (2021)	September 26, 2021	Columbus, Ohio	Nationwide Arena	Roman Reigns (c) vs. "The Demon" Finn Bálor in an Extreme Rules match for the WWE Universal Championship	
14	Extreme Rules (2022)	October 8, 2022	Philadelphia, Pennsylvania	Wells Fargo Center	Matt Riddle vs. Seth "Freakin" Rollins in a Fight Pit match with Daniel Cormier as the special guest referee.	
(c) – refers to the champion(s) heading into the match

Notes

^{1}The main event match, which was the Wyatt Swamp Fight, was pre-recorded at an undisclosed location about two hours outside of Orlando on July 16–17.
