= Extreme Rules (2014) =

WWE pay-per-view and livestreaming event

- Promotional poster featuring Daniel Bryan
- Promotion: WWE
- Date: May 4, 2014
- City: East Rutherford, New Jersey
- Venue: Izod Center
- Attendance: 15,907
- Buy rate: 108,000 (excluding WWE Network views)

WWE event chronology
← Previous; WrestleMania XXX	Next → NXT TakeOver

Extreme Rules chronology
← Previous; 2013	Next → 2015

The 2014 Extreme Rules was a professional wrestling pay-per-view (PPV) and livestreaming event produced by WWE. It was the sixth annual Extreme Rules event and took place on May 4, 2014, at the Izod Center in East Rutherford, New Jersey. The theme of the event was that it featured hardcore-based matches.

Eight professional wrestling matches were contested at the event, including one on the Kickoff pre-show. Only three matches, including the pre-show match, were contested under a hardcore stipulation. In the main event, Daniel Bryan defeated Kane in an Extreme Rules match to retain the WWE World Heavyweight Championship. In another prominent match, The Shield (Dean Ambrose, Seth Rollins, and Roman Reigns) defeated the reunited Evolution (Triple H, Randy Orton, and Batista) in a six-man tag team match.

This was the first Extreme Rules event to livestream on the WWE Network, which launched in February. The event received 108,000 pay-per-view buys (excluding WWE Network views), down from the previous year's 231,000 buys.

== Production ==
=== Background ===
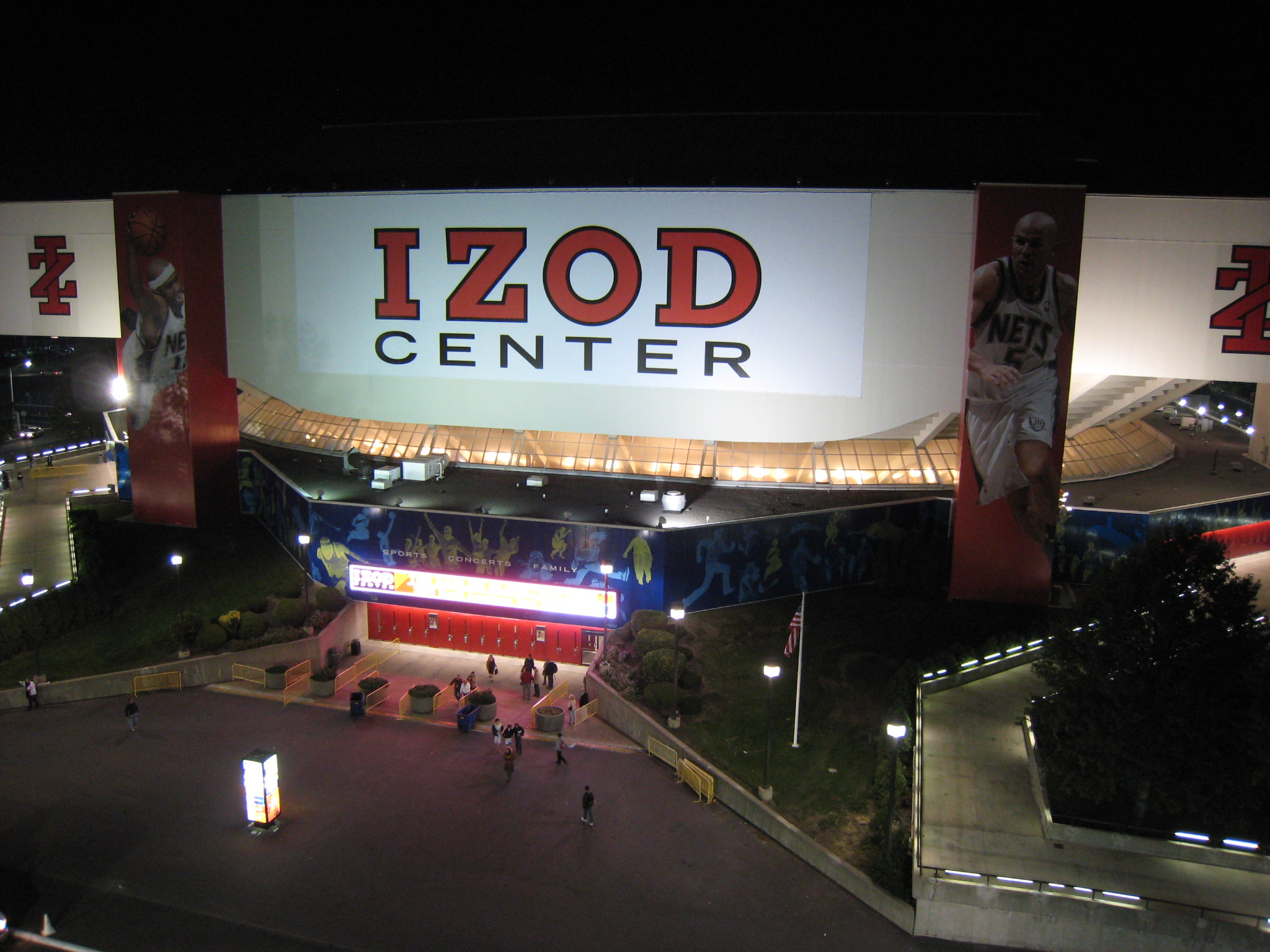
The sixth annual Extreme Rules event was held at the Izod Center in East Rutherford, New Jersey.

Extreme Rules was an annual professional wrestling pay-per-view (PPV) event produced by WWE since 2009. The concept of the event was that it featured various matches that were contested under hardcore rules and generally featured one Extreme Rules match. The defunct Extreme Championship Wrestling promotion, which WWE acquired in 2003, originally used the "extreme rules" term to describe the regulations for all of its matches; WWE adopted the term, using it in place of "hardcore match" or "hardcore rules". The sixth Extreme Rules event took place on May 4, 2014, at the Izod Center in East Rutherford, New Jersey. In addition to traditional PPV, it was the first Extreme Rules to air on WWE's livestreaming service, the WWE Network, which launched in February.

=== Storylines ===
The event comprised eight matches, including one on the Kickoff pre-show, that resulted from scripted storylines. Results were predetermined by WWE's writers, while storylines were produced on WWE's weekly television shows, Monday Night Raw and SmackDown.

Fresh off his win at WrestleMania XXX, John Cena continued to feud with Bray Wyatt of The Wyatt Family. Cena called Wyatt out for his inability to physically defend himself and his cryptic messages without Luke Harper and Erick Rowan by his side. To make Wyatt prove himself, Cena challenged him to a Steel Cage match, which Wyatt accepted. On the April 28 episode of Raw, Cena entered the steel cage to address Wyatt's evil message saying that it has begun to spread amongst the audience, only to be greeted by Wyatt and a children's choir singing "He's Got the Whole World in His Hands" with many Wyatt Family supporters singing along. As the children surrounded the ring, the lights went out before coming back on, with the children now wearing sheep masks as Wyatt laughed maniacally with a child on his lap.

On Raw the day after WrestleMania XXX, Triple H forced Daniel Bryan to defend his newly won WWE World Heavyweight Championship against him. However, Triple H's former bodyguards, The Shield (Roman Reigns, Seth Rollins, and Dean Ambrose), turned on him and attacked him, resulting in a no contest. As a result, Triple H reformed Evolution with Batista and Randy Orton and attacked The Shield the following week on Raw. On the April 18 episode of SmackDown, Triple H scheduled a six-man tag team match between Evolution and The Shield for Extreme Rules. On the Raw before Extreme Rules, Ric Flair, once part of Evolution, came out only to give his endorsement to the Shield, acknowledging them as the future of WWE.

On the April 7 episode of Raw, AJ Lee was bragging about having defended the WWE Divas Championship against 13 other divas at WrestleMania XXX when NXT Women's Champion Paige came out to congratulate AJ on her title defense. AJ then slapped Paige and challenged her to a match for AJ's Divas Championship. The match itself was dominated by AJ until Paige escaped AJ's submission move, the Black Widow, and hit one of her finishing moves, the Paige Turner, to win her first Divas Championship. On the April 15 episode of WWE Main Event, AJ's bodyguard, Tamina Snuka, won a battle royal to become number one contender to Paige's title, allowing her to wrestle Paige for the championship at Extreme Rules.

On the Raw after WrestleMania XXX, Cesaro replaced his manager Zeb Colter with Paul Heyman. This started a rivalry between Heyman and Colter, and by extension between Cesaro and his former tag team partner, Jack Swagger, who was still managed by Colter. Both wrestlers were entered into the tournament to determine Big E's challenger. Prior to Cesaro's semi-final match against Rob Van Dam, Van Dam badmouthed Heyman and advised Cesaro to stay away from him. Van Dam beat Cesaro via count-out after interference from Swagger and Colter. The following week on Raw, Colter approached Van Dam and suggested that he and Swagger team up to take on a common enemy in Heyman, but Van Dam declined. Van Dam later lost the tournament final to Bad News Barrett after interference from Cesaro; Swagger then appeared, attacked Cesaro and attempted to attack Van Dam before being fought off. This set up a triple threat match between Cesaro, Swagger, and Van Dam at Extreme Rules.

On the April 21 episode of Raw, Daniel Bryan and Brie Bella were getting ready to celebrate their marriage when Stephanie McMahon came out and scheduled Bryan to defend his WWE World Heavyweight Championship against Kane at Extreme Rules. Kane then came out from the audience and attacked Bryan, giving him three Tombstone Piledrivers – the first on the floor, the second on the steel steps, and the third on the broadcast table, resulting in Bryan being stretchered out of the arena. One week later, during Brie Bella's match with Paige, Kane came up through a hole from underneath the ring and attempted to pull Brie down with him but she got away.

Alexander Rusev made his main roster debut on April 7 and scored victories over various superstars, including R-Truth and Xavier Woods. He also attacked both competitors after their respective matches. This set up a 2-on-1 Handicap match with Rusev against R-Truth and Woods at the pay-per-view.

On the May 2 episode of SmackDown, El Torito and Hornswoggle signed the contract for a WeeLC match - a Tables, Ladders, and Chairs match featuring midget wrestlers, with reduced size tables, ladders, and chairs than a normal such match, for the Kickoff pre-show.

== Event ==
Other on-screen personnel
Role:	Name:
English commentators	Michael Cole
English commentators	Jerry Lawler
English commentators	John "Bradshaw" Layfield
Spanish commentators	Carlos Cabrera
Spanish commentators	Marcelo Rodriguez
Spanish commentators	Ricardo Rodriguez
Interviewers	Byron Saxton
Interviewers	Renee Young
Ring announcers	Lilian Garcia
Ring announcers	Justin Roberts
Referees	John Cone
Referees	Rod Zapata
Referees	Marc Harris
Referees	Jason Ayers
Pre-Show panel	Josh Mathews
Pre-Show panel	Alex Riley
Pre-Show panel	Booker T
Pre-Show panel	Sheamus

=== Broadcasters ===
The English commentators were Michael Cole, Jerry Lawler, and John "Bradshaw" Layfield while there were also Spanish and German commentators ringside. Lilian Garcia and Justin Roberts were ring announcers. The Kickoff pre-show was hosted by a panel of Booker T, Alex Riley, Josh Mathews, and Sheamus.

=== Pre-show ===
During the Extreme Rules Kickoff pre-show, El Torito faced Hornswoggle in a WeeLC match, a special Little Person version of a TLC match (as 'wee' is a synonym for 'small' widely used in Scotland). The referee, ring announcer, timekeeper, and commentators were LP versions of regular personnel. Torito picked up the victory after a Springboard Seated Senton through a table.

=== Preliminary matches ===
The actual pay-per-view opened with a Triple threat elimination match between Cesaro, Jack Swagger, and Rob Van Dam. Van Dam pinned Swagger after a Five Star Frog Splash to eliminate Swagger. In the climax, Van Dam performed a Van Daminator into a trash can on Cesaro and attempted a Five Star Frog Splash but Cesaro avoided, causing Van Dam to crash into the trash can. Cesaro performed a Neutralizer onto the trash can on Van Dam to win the match.

After that, Alexander Rusev took on R-Truth and Xavier Woods in a 2-on-1 Handicap match. Before the match, Rusev attacked Woods, thus taking Woods out of the match. Rusev forced R-Truth to submit to the Accolade to win the match.

In the next match, Big E defended his WWE Intercontinental Championship against Bad News Barrett. The match ended when Barrett performed a Bull Hammer on Big E to win the title.

In the fourth match, The Shield (Roman Reigns, Seth Rollins, and Dean Ambrose) faced Evolution (Batista, Triple H, and Randy Orton). During the match, Triple H performed a Pedigree on Reigns and Batista attempted to pin him for a near-fall. Orton performed an RKO on Reigns but Rollins broke up a pinfall by Batista at a two count. Ambrose ran across the announce tables and leapt onto Triple H and Orton. Triple H, Orton, Ambrose and Rollins fought into the arena stands, where Triple H and Orton caused Ambrose to fall down a set of stairs. Triple H and Orton attacked Ambrose until Rollins dove off a balcony onto Triple H and Orton. The ending saw Batista perform a Spinebuster on Reigns and attempt a Batista Bomb on Reigns but Reigns countered and performed a Superman Punch on Batista. Reigns performed a Spear on Batista for the win.

The fifth match was a Steel Cage match between John Cena and Bray Wyatt. During the match, Harper attacked Cena atop the cage, resulting in Harper falling into the cage. Cena performed a Super Attitude Adjustment on Wyatt but Harper broke up the pinfall. Rowan attacked Cena atop the cage but Cena pulled Rowan's beard, causing Rowan to collide with the cage. In the end, Cena performed a Diving Leg Drop Bulldog on Harper and attempted to escape through the door but the arena lights went off. When the arena lights turned on, a demonic child appeared, singing "He's Got the Whole World in His Hands". Wyatt performed Sister Abigail on Cena and escaped through the door to win the match.

In the penultimate match, Paige defended her WWE Divas Championship against Tamina Snuka. In the end, Tamina attempted a Superkick but Paige countered and forced Tamina to submit to the PTO, retaining the title.

=== Main event ===
In the main event, Daniel Bryan defended the WWE World Heavyweight Championship against Kane in an Extreme Rules match. During the match, Bryan and Kane fought backstage, where Bryan attacked Kane with a snow shovel. Bryan placed Kane on a forklift and drove the forklift into the arena, where Bryan performed a Diving Headbutt off the forklift on Kane for a near-fall. Kane performed a Chokeslam on Bryan for a near-fall. Kane attempted a Tombstone Piledriver onto a chair on Bryan but Bryan countered into a DDT on the chair for a near-fall. Bryan applied the Yes Lock using a kendo stick but Kane escaped the hold. Bryan attempted a Suicide Dive on Kane but Kane countered and performed a Chokeslam on Bryan through an announce table. Kane retrieved a table and set the table on fire using lighter fluid but Bryan pulled the ring ropes, causing Kane to fall through the table. Bryan performed a Running Knee on Kane to retain the title.

== Aftermath ==
At the start of Raw after Extreme Rules, Dean Ambrose was forced to defend his United States Championship in a 20-man battle royal. Ambrose made it to the end with Sheamus, Sheamus eliminated Ambrose to win his second United States Championship, ending Ambrose's reign at 351 days. The Shield then fought The Wyatt Family later in the night; just as things turned in The Shield's favor, Evolution came out and distracted The Shield, allowing The Wyatt Family to win the match. Evolution then assaulted The Shield, and humiliated them by performing The Shield's signature Triple Powerbomb to Roman Reigns. This led to The Shield challenging Evolution to a rematch at Payback, which they accepted. The match was made a No Holds Barred Elimination match.

Cena's feud with Wyatt continued with a Last Man Standing match being set up for Payback. At the pay-per-view, Cena defeated Wyatt to win the match and end their feud.

On the May 12 episode of Raw, Daniel Bryan announced that he would undergo neck surgery, and would be absent from WWE for an unspecified amount of time. That same night, Stephanie McMahon called Bryan to the ring, before Kane dragged him out into the entrance before being loaded onto a stretcher by medical personnel. On May 15, Bryan underwent successful neck surgery, with a cervical foraminotomy to decompress the nerve root having been performed. On the May 19 episode of Raw, Stephanie McMahon gave Bryan an ultimatum to surrender the WWE World Heavyweight Championship the following week on Raw. Bryan replied next week on Raw that he wouldn't surrender it. McMahon then retaliated saying that she would give until Payback to surrender the title. If he didn't surrender, his wife Brie Bella would be fired. At Payback, Brie would let Bryan keep the championship by quitting WWE, and finalized it by slapping McMahon across the face.

== Results ==
No.	Results	Stipulations	Times
1^{P}	El Torito (with Diego and Fernando) defeated Hornswoggle (with Drew McIntyre, Heath Slater, and Jinder Mahal)	WeeLC match	11:01
2	Cesaro (with Paul Heyman) defeated Rob Van Dam and Jack Swagger (with Zeb Colter) by pinfall	Triple threat elimination match	12:34
3	Alexander Rusev (with Lana) defeated R-Truth and Xavier Woods by submission	Handicap match	2:53
4	Bad News Barrett defeated Big E (c) by pinfall	Singles match for the WWE Intercontinental Championship	7:55
5	The Shield (Dean Ambrose, Seth Rollins, and Roman Reigns) defeated Evolution (Batista, Randy Orton, and Triple H) by pinfall	Six-man tag team match	19:52
6	Bray Wyatt (with Erick Rowan and Luke Harper) defeated John Cena by escaping the cage	Steel Cage match	21:12
7	Paige (c) defeated Tamina Snuka by submission	Singles match for the WWE Divas Championship	6:18
8	Daniel Bryan (c) defeated Kane by pinfall	Extreme Rules match for the WWE World Heavyweight Championship	22:27
(c) / – the champion(s) heading into the match; P / – the match was broadcast on the pre-show

=== Triple Threat Eliminations ===
Elimination	Wrestler	Eliminated by	Method	Time
1	Jack Swagger	Rob Van Dam	Pinfall	6:25
2	Rob Van Dam	Cesaro	Pinfall	12:34
3	Cesaro	Winner		

=== Intercontinental Championship No. 1 Contender's Tournament ===
1st Round; Raw; April 14, 2014
Mark Henry	3:18
Cesaro	Pinfall
Rob Van Dam	Pinfall
Alberto Del Rio	10:35
Sheamus	Pinfall
Jack Swagger	6:55
Dolph Ziggler	12:12
Bad News Barrett	Pinfall

Semifinals; Raw; April 21, 2014
Cesaro	13:13
Rob Van Dam	Countout
Sheamus	10:33
Bad News Barrett	Pinfall

Final; Raw; April 28, 2014
Rob Van Dam	11:24
Bad News Barrett	Pinfall
