= WWE One Night Stand =

World Wrestling Entertainment pay-per-view event series

- WWE One Night Stand logo
- Promotions: World Wrestling Entertainment
- Brands: Raw (2007–2008); SmackDown (2007–2008); ECW (2006–2008)
- Other names: ECW One Night Stand (2005–2006); WWE One Night Stand: Extreme Rules (2007–2008)
- First event: 2005
- Last event: 2008
- Event gimmick: Hardcore wrestling

WWE One Night Stand was a professional wrestling pay-per-view (PPV) event, produced every June by World Wrestling Entertainment (WWE), a professional wrestling promotion based in Connecticut. The event was created in 2005 and its name refers to its original format, that being a one-night reunion show for Extreme Championship Wrestling alumni. The first two shows were promoted under the ECW acronym; this, however, was changed for the 2007 and 2008 events. As WWE launched their own version of ECW in 2006 as a third brand alongside Raw and SmackDown, these two shows were promoted under the WWE acronym. The final event under the One Night Stand name was in 2008 before being renamed Extreme Rules in 2009. The 2009 Extreme Rules was noted by WWE to be a direct continuation of the One Night Stand chronology; however, the 2010 event was later promoted as only the second event under a new Extreme Rules chronology, one that is no longer a direct continuation of the One Night Stand event. Extreme Rules, however, continued the theme of featuring various hardcore-based matches.

== History ==
In 2001, the Extreme Championship Wrestling (ECW) promotion was closed down due to financial issues and World Wrestling Entertainment (WWE) acquired the former promotion's assets in 2003. With the success of The Rise and Fall of ECW (2004) documentary, WWE announced that they would be holding an ECW reunion show on June 12, 2005, at the Hammerstein Ballroom in the Manhattan borough of New York, New York, titled ECW One Night Stand. Although the build-up for the pay-per-view began in the middle of May, plans were in the works behind the scenes for several months in advance. Tommy Dreamer was in charge of organizing the hardcore-based event and getting ECW alumni to participate, which were referred to as ECW Originals in the build to the show. He contacted several people, including The Sandman, Sabu, Justin Credible, and ECW commentator Joey Styles. Reports later stated that Paul Heyman was working with Dreamer to help prepare the event. Other ECW related wrestlers were later added to the pay-per-view. The event was publicly confirmed by WWE through a Dish Network magazine in March 2005. In an interview with SLAM! Sports days before One Night Stand, ECW original Rob Van Dam announced he had asked Vince McMahon about the idea of holding an ECW reunion event. Although held as a reunion show for ECW alumni, wrestlers from WWE's Raw and SmackDown brands also took part in the event.

WWE adopted One Night Stand as an annual June pay-per-view event and continued the theme of featuring hardcore-based matches on the show. The event returned to the Hammerstein Ballroom for ECW One Night Stand 2006. Just prior to this 2006 event, WWE established a third brand dubbed ECW for former wrestlers of the original promotion, as well as newer talent, to compete on. One Night Stand would continue for another two years (dropping the "ECW" name in 2007 and just being promoted as WWE), until it was replaced by Extreme Rules in 2009. One Night Stand was originally just renamed Extreme Rules for 2009, but in 2010, WWE declared that Extreme Rules was its own chronology, one that was no longer part of the One Night Stand chronology. Extreme Rules, however, continued the hardcore-based theme.

== Events ==
#	Event	Date	City	Venue	Main event	Ref.
1	ECW One Night Stand (2005)	June 12, 2005	New York, New York	Hammerstein Ballroom	The Dudley Boyz (Bubba Ray Dudley and D-Von Dudley) vs. Tommy Dreamer and The Sandman	
2	ECW One Night Stand (2006)	June 11, 2006	New York, New York	Hammerstein Ballroom	John Cena (c) vs. Rob Van Dam in an Extreme Rules match for the WWE Championship; This was Rob Van Dam's Money in the Bank cash-in match.	
3	One Night Stand (2007)	June 3, 2007	Jacksonville, Florida	Jacksonville Veterans Memorial Arena	John Cena (c) vs. The Great Khali in a Falls Count Anywhere match for the WWE Championship	
4	One Night Stand (2008)	June 1, 2008	San Diego, California	San Diego Sports Arena	Edge vs. The Undertaker in a Tables, Ladders, and Chairs match for the vacant World Heavyweight Championship	
(c) – refers to the champion(s) heading into the match

== See also ==
- Extreme Championship Wrestling
- List of WWE pay-per-view events
- WWE Extreme Rules
- Hardcore Homecoming
- Hardcore Justice (2010)
