= Extreme Rules (2013) =

WWE pay-per-view event

- Promotional poster featuring Sheamus
- Promotion: WWE
- Date: May 19, 2013
- City: St. Louis, Missouri
- Venue: Scottrade Center
- Attendance: 17,529
- Buy rate: 231,000

Pay-per-view chronology
| ← Previous; WrestleMania 29 | Next → Payback |

Extreme Rules chronology
| ← Previous; 2012 | Next → 2014 |

The 2013 Extreme Rules was a professional wrestling pay-per-view (PPV) event produced by WWE. It was the fifth annual Extreme Rules event and took place on May 19, 2013, at the Scottrade Center in St. Louis, Missouri. The theme of the event was that it featured various hardcore-based matches.

Eight matches took place on the event's card and one Pre-Show match was livestreamed on YouTube. Five of the main card's matches were contested under a hardcore stipulation. In the main event, Brock Lesnar defeated Triple H in a Steel Cage match. In other prominent matches, WWE Champion John Cena and Ryback fought to a no contest in a Last Man Standing match, Dean Ambrose defeated Kofi Kingston to capture the WWE United States Championship, The Shield (Seth Rollins and Roman Reigns) defeated Team Hell No (Kane and Daniel Bryan) in a tornado tag team match to win their first WWE Tag Team Championship, and Randy Orton defeated Big Show in an Extreme Rules match.

The 2013 event's scheduling replaced Over the Limit as the year's May PPV. Extreme Rules 2013 received 231,000 pay-per-view buys, down from previous year's event of 263,000. This was the final Extreme Rules event to broadcast exclusively via traditional PPV outlets due to the launch of the WWE Network streaming service in February 2014. It was also the last to feature the previous version of the World Heavyweight Championship, which was unified with the WWE Championship in December.

== Production ==
=== Background ===
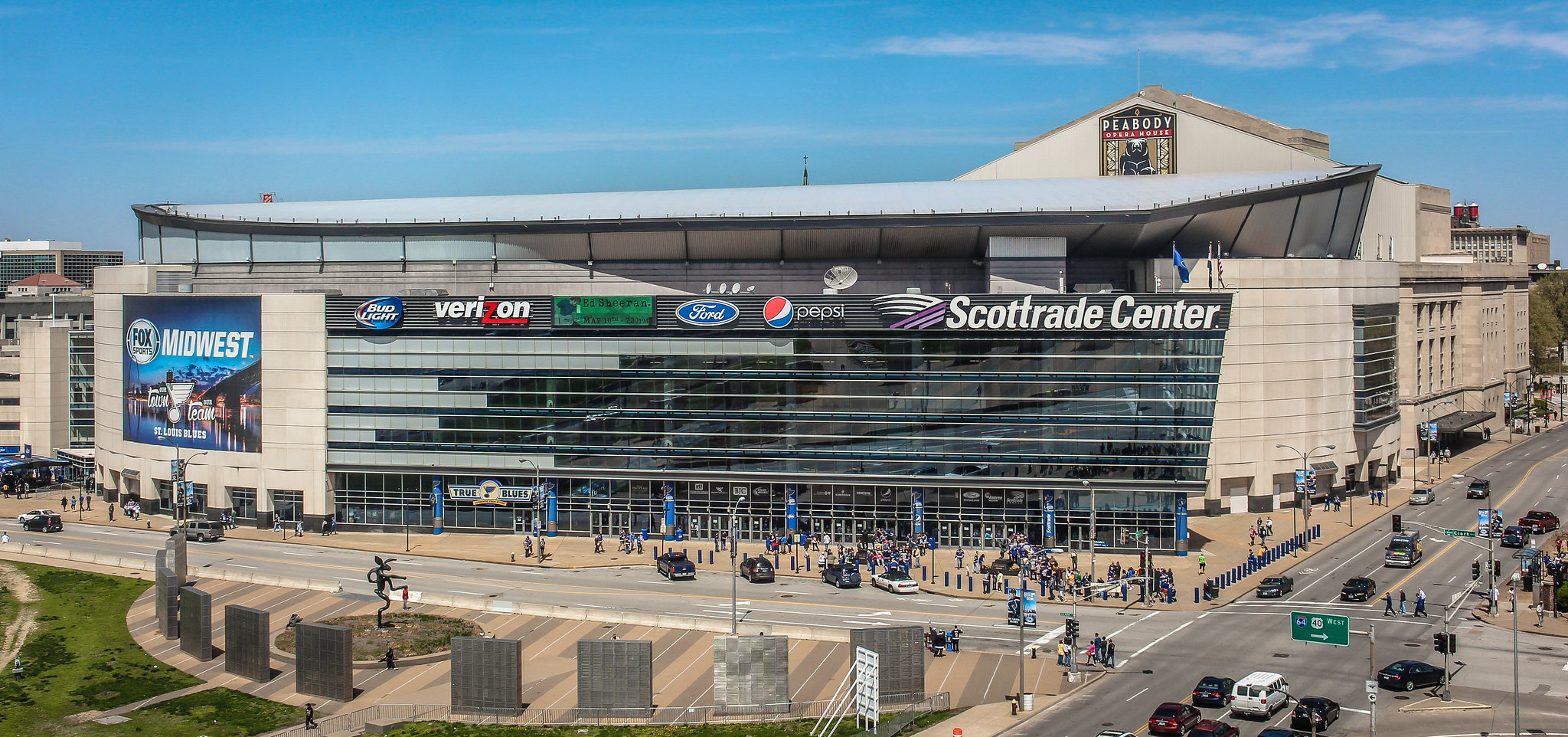
The fifth annual Extreme Rules event was held at the Scottrade Center in St. Louis, Missouri.

Extreme Rules was an annual professional wrestling pay-per-view (PPV) event produced by WWE since 2009. The concept of the event was that it featured various matches that were contested under hardcore rules and generally featured one Extreme Rules match. The defunct Extreme Championship Wrestling promotion, which WWE acquired in 2003, originally used the "extreme rules" term to describe the regulations for all of its matches; WWE adopted the term, using it in place of "hardcore match" or "hardcore rules". The fifth Extreme Rules event was scheduled for May 19, 2013, at the Scottrade Center in St. Louis, Missouri. It replaced Over the Limit for that year's May PPV.

=== Storylines ===
The professional wrestling matches at Extreme Rules featured professional wrestlers performing as characters in scripted events pre-determined by the hosting promotion, WWE. Storylines were produced on WWE's weekly television shows, Raw and SmackDown.

At WrestleMania 29, Triple H defeated Brock Lesnar in their rematch. Lesnar's manager, Paul Heyman, then issued one final match to settle things between Triple H and Lesnar: a Steel Cage match at Extreme Rules. On the April 22 episode of Raw in London, England, Triple H accepted the match by assaulting Heyman with a Pedigree. Two weeks later on Raw, Lesnar would respond by coming to WWE headquarters and trashing Triple H's office and attacking nearby employees. The week after on Raw, Triple H would come face to face with Lesnar, goading him in coming into the steel cage. Triple H would gain the upper hand and throw Lesnar into Heyman, resulting in both men retreating up to the ramp.

On the episode of Raw following WrestleMania 29, Alberto Del Rio lost the World Heavyweight Championship to Dolph Ziggler after Ziggler cashed in his Money in the Bank contract to take advantage of Del Rio being injured by Jack Swagger to become the new champion. Del Rio tried to invoke his rematch clause the following week, but was again impeded by Swagger. Senior Advisor Theodore Long then set up a match between Ziggler and Swagger, and Swagger won. SmackDown General Manager Booker T, irate at Long for going above him, rearranged the match into a triple threat match for the championship between Ziggler, Del Rio, and Swagger. On the April 29 episode of Raw, Del Rio's personal ring announcer Ricardo Rodriguez won a triple-threat match over Swagger's mentor Zeb Colter and Ziggler's bodyguard Big E Langston to pick the stipulation for the match, which would be a Ladder match selected by Del Rio. On the May 6 episode of Raw, Del Rio defeated Ziggler via disqualification when Swagger attacked both men with a ladder, resulting in Ziggler suffering a legitimate concussion. Ziggler was removed from the PPV as a result of his injury, and the next week on Raw, Long announced that Del Rio and Swagger would instead wrestle in an "I Quit" match, for the #1 contendership to the World Heavyweight Championship.

A day after WrestleMania 29 on Raw, John Cena, who defeated The Rock for the WWE Championship, would issue a challenge to anybody to face him for the title after news broke out that Rock would undergo surgery. Mark Henry would come forward and face him in a match for a shot at the title later in the night, but he would lose via count-out. Henry would assault Cena afterward until Ryback seemingly came to save Cena, but Ryback would attack Cena and hold the title up high. A week later, Ryback explained that he was living in Cena's shadow and Cena never helped him against The Shield. Ryback would watch The Shield attack Cena from the ramp. Prior to the April 22 episode of Raw, it was announced that Cena would defend the WWE Championship against Ryback. Later that night, Ryback would confront Mick Foley about his decision to attack Cena. Cena would come and save Foley, but The Shield would come out to attack the two men. Cena retreated up to the ramp to see Ryback get assaulted by The Shield, but he would assault all three members with a chair, forcing The Shield to retreat, and gave Ryback an Attitude Adjustment. On the May 6 episode of Raw, Ryback would make the title match a Last Man Standing Match. Later that night, both John Cena and Ryback would drive away The Shield only for Ryback to attack Cena with a chair in retaliation. A week after on Raw, Ryback would attack Cena and his injured Achilles tendon with a chair following Cena being attacked by The Shield after a six-man elimination match that ended in a disqualification win for Cena.

After Big Show speared all three members of The Shield (Roman Reigns, Seth Rollins, and Dean Ambrose) at WrestleMania 29, Randy Orton tagged himself and that gave The Shield the victory. Afterwards, Big Show knocked out both Orton and Sheamus. Both Orton and Sheamus would get their revenge on Big Show by defeating him twice in handicap matches on the April 12 episode of SmackDown and the April 15 episode of Raw, but Big Show would team up with Mark Henry to defeat Sheamus and Orton on the April 19 episode of SmackDown. On the May 3 episode of SmackDown, Orton defeated Damien Sandow in a singles match only afterwards for Big Show to interfere and Sandow attacked Orton post-match. After defeating Sandow in a second straight singles match three days later on Raw, Big Show knocked out Orton as Orton was about to head to the locker room. Prior to the May 10 episode of SmackDown, it was announced that Orton and Big Show would fight in an Extreme Rules match on the pay-per-view.

Mark Henry would attack Sheamus backstage twice on the April 12 episode of SmackDown and on the April 15 of Raw. Sheamus would then attack Henry backstage as a result before going on to embarrass Henry in a tug of war on the April 29 episode of Raw and an arm wrestling contest on the May 3 episode of SmackDown. A few days later on Raw, both men agreed to a match on the pay-per-view. After Sheamus defeated Wade Barrett in a singles match, Henry would immediately attack Sheamus with a belt, ultimately making their match a strap match. A week later on Raw, Sheamus would attack Henry with two leather straps.

The Shield (Roman Reigns, Seth Rollins, and Dean Ambrose) continued their reign of attacks on various superstars, particularly Team Hell No (Daniel Bryan and Kane) and United States Champion Kofi Kingston, who got pinned by Ambrose on the May 6 episode of Raw. As a result, Ambrose was to receive a title match against Kingston for the United States Championship, while Rollins and Reigns were to face Team Hell No for the WWE Tag Team Championship.

A minor rivalry continued between Chris Jericho and Fandango when Jericho made fun of Fandango's name backstage on the March 22 edition of Raw. Fandango would begin to interfere in Jericho's matches afterwards, setting a match (Fandango's debut match) between the two at WrestleMania 29, in which Fandango won. On the May 6 episode of Raw, Fandango would suffer his first loss via count-out to R-Truth when the judges (Jericho and Tons of Funk) gave Truth and Miz a much better rating as a dancer. A week later on Raw, Jericho and Fandango would face off in a dance off, but Fandango's dance partner Summer Rae feigned an injury, which distracted Jericho and led to Fandango attacking him.

== Event ==
Other on-screen personnel
| Role: | Name: |
|---|---|
| English Commentators | Michael Cole |
| English Commentators | Jerry Lawler |
| English Commentators | John "Bradshaw" Layfield |
| Spanish Commentators | Carlos Cabrera |
| Spanish Commentators | Marcelo Rodriguez |
| Backstage interviewer | Tony Dawson |
| Ring announcers | Lilian Garcia |
| Ring announcers | Justin Roberts |
| Referees | Mike Chioda |
| Referees | Charles Robinson |
| Referees | John Cone |
| Referees | Darrick Moore |
| Referees | Scott Armstrong |
| Referees | Ryan Tran |
| Referees | Rod Zapata |
| Pre-show panel | Renee Young |
| Pre-show panel | Wade Barrett |
| Pre-show panel | Mick Foley |
| Pre-show panel | Titus O'Neil |

=== Pre-show ===
The Extreme Rules Pre-Show match was between Cody Rhodes and The Miz. Miz won by forcing Rhodes to submit to the figure-four leglock.

=== Preliminary matches ===
The first match was between Chris Jericho and Fandango. During the match, Fandango managed to grab the ropes while Jericho had the Walls of Jericho locked in. Jericho eventually picked up the win using the Codebreaker in mid-air on Fandango.

The second match was a United States Championship match between Kofi Kingston and Dean Ambrose of The Shield. Ambrose made his entrance with the other Shield members, but they left before the match started, leaving Ambrose alone with Kingston. In the end, Kingston attempted Trouble in Paradise, but Ambrose avoided the move. Ambrose executed Dirty Deeds on Kingston for the win.

The third match was a strap match between Mark Henry and Sheamus. The match went back and forth with both competitors touching three turnbuckles in succession but failing to reach the fourth. The end came when Sheamus performed a Brogue Kick on Henry after reversing a World's Strongest Slam attempt. He then proceeded to touch his final turnbuckle for the win.

The fourth match was an "I Quit" match between Alberto Del Rio and Jack Swagger to determine the #1 contender to the World Heavyweight Championship. Swagger appeared to have won when Zeb Colter threw in Ricardo Rodriguez's towel for Del Rio and referee Mike Chioda mistook it as Rodriguez throwing it, but later reversed the decision upon viewing a video replay, allowing the match to continue. Del Rio would go on to win after applying the cross armbreaker, which forced Swagger to quit.

The fifth match was a tornado tag team match for the WWE Tag Team Championship between Team Hell No (Daniel Bryan and Kane) and Seth Rollins and Roman Reigns of The Shield. The Shield picked up the victory by executing an Argentine backbreaker rack and diving knee drop combination on Bryan.

=== Main event matches ===
The first match of the three main event matches was an Extreme Rules match between Big Show and Randy Orton. During the match, Big Show delivered a chokeslam, but Orton kicked out. Orton performed an RKO, but Show kicked out. He then performed an RKO onto a steel chair and punted Show in the head for the victory.

The seventh match was a Last Man Standing match for the WWE Championship between John Cena and Ryback. At the end of the match, Ryback tackled Cena through the electronic wall on the stage, severely injuring him and leaving both down for the 10-count, making the match a no-contest. Despite this, Cena remained the WWE Champion, as championships do not change hands by a no-contest.

The last match of the night was a Steel Cage match between Brock Lesnar and Triple H. Early, Lesnar hurt his leg as he slammed inadvertently himself on the steel cage, and Triple H, seizing the opportunity, attacked Lesnar's leg for the majority of the match. Near the end, Triple H revealed a sledgehammer that he had hidden on top of the cage, but Lesnar countered quickly by making Triple H slip from the turnbuckle. Lesnar grabbed the sledgehammer but Triple H ducked and applied the sharpshooter on Lesnar. As Paul Heyman ran in the cage to save Lesnar, Triple H broke the hold to perform a Pedigree on Heyman. Triple H executed a Pedigree on Lesnar for a near-fall. Triple H grabbed the sledgehammer and was ready to hit Lesnar until Heyman delivered a low blow from behind. Lesnar finished the match by hitting Triple H with the sledgehammer, executing an F-5 on Triple H and pinning Triple H to win the match and end their feud.

== Aftermath ==
The next night on Raw, Ryback drove into the arena on an ambulance and challenged John Cena for the WWE Championship at Payback in an ambulance match. On the May 27 episode, Cena challenged Ryback to a 3 Stages of Hell match (with the Ambulance match being the third stage), and Ryback accepted.

Paul Heyman revealed his newest client, Curtis Axel (the former Michael McGillicutty from NXT). Triple H challenged Axel to a match, in which he was not medically cleared to compete. He wrestled the match but suffered a concussion, leading to Curtis Axel picking up the victory via KO.

On the May 24 episode of SmackDown, Kingston would invoke his rematch clause for the U.S. Championship against Ambrose, but he won via disqualification with Rollins and Reigns interfering. Sheamus and Randy Orton would save Kingston, setting a six-man tag team match between The Shield and Orton, Sheamus, and Kingston, but The Shield would emerge victorious. Three days later on Raw, Kingston would receive another rematch for the title, but Ambrose would defeat Kingston to retain the title.

On the May 27 episode of Raw, Team Hell No invoked their rematch clause for the WWE Tag Team Championships, but Roman Reigns and Seth Rollins would defeat them to retain the titles.

Although Dolph Ziggler was absent due to recovering from his concussion suffered from Jack Swagger, Alberto Del Rio would be defeated by Ziggler's bodyguard Big E Langston the next night on Raw, but Del Rio would defeat him twice two days later on Main Event and five days later on Raw. Four days later on SmackDown, Langston would defeat Del Rio, but three days later on Raw, Del Rio defeated Langston. On the June 7 episode of SmackDown, Ziggler appeared via satellite announcing he would make his return on the June 10 episode of Raw and announced that he would defend the title against Del Rio at Payback.

This was the final Extreme Rules event to broadcast exclusively via traditional PPV outlets due to the launch of the WWE Network streaming service in February 2014. It was also the last to feature the previous version of the World Heavyweight Championship, which was unified with the WWE Championship in December at TLC: Tables, Ladders & Chairs; the World Heavyweight Championship was immediately retired while the WWE Championship became known as the WWE World Heavyweight Championship.

== Results ==
| No. | Results | Stipulations | Times |
|---|---|---|---|
| 1^{P} | The Miz defeated Cody Rhodes by submission | Singles match | 05:00 |
| 2 | Chris Jericho defeated Fandango (with Summer Rae) by pinfall | Singles match | 08:36 |
| 3 | Dean Ambrose defeated Kofi Kingston (c) by pinfall | Singles match for the WWE United States Championship | 06:48 |
| 4 | Sheamus defeated Mark Henry | Strap match | 07:58 |
| 5 | Alberto Del Rio (with Ricardo Rodriguez) defeated Jack Swagger (with Zeb Colter) | "I Quit" match to determine the #1 contender for the World Heavyweight Championship | 11:18 |
| 6 | The Shield (Roman Reigns and Seth Rollins) defeated Team Hell No (Daniel Bryan and Kane) (c) by pinfall | Tornado tag team match for the WWE Tag Team Championship | 07:23 |
| 7 | Randy Orton defeated Big Show by pinfall | Extreme Rules match | 13:01 |
| 8 | John Cena (c) vs. Ryback ended in a no contest | Last Man Standing match for the WWE Championship | 21:30 |
| 9 | Brock Lesnar (with Paul Heyman) defeated Triple H by pinfall | Steel Cage match | 20:08 |
(c) / – the champion(s) heading into the match; P / – the match was broadcast on the pre-show
