= Extreme Rules (2010) =

World Wrestling Entertainment pay-per-view event

- Promotional poster featuring Sheamus
- Promotion: World Wrestling Entertainment
- Brand(s): Raw; SmackDown
- Date: April 25, 2010
- City: Baltimore, Maryland
- Venue: 1st Mariner Arena
- Attendance: 12,278
- Buy rate: 182,000

Pay-per-view chronology
← Previous; WrestleMania XXVI	Next → Over the Limit

Extreme Rules chronology
← Previous; 2009	Next → 2011

The 2010 Extreme Rules was a professional wrestling pay-per-view (PPV) event produced by World Wrestling Entertainment (WWE). It was the second annual Extreme Rules and took place on April 25, 2010, at the 1st Mariner Arena in Baltimore, Maryland, held for wrestlers from the promotion's Raw and SmackDown brand divisions. The theme of the event was that it featured various hardcore-based matches.

Although this was the second Extreme Rules event, it was the first to feature the titular Extreme Rules match, which is just the name that WWE uses in place of hardcore match or hardcore rules and was adopted from the former Extreme Championship Wrestling, the assets of which WWE acquired in 2003. After the inaugural 2009 event was held in June, the 2010 event was moved up to the April/May slot of WWE's PPV calendar, replacing Backlash in the post-WrestleMania slot.

There were eight matches scheduled on the event's card, all of which were contested under a hardcore stipulation. There was also one dark match that occurred before the live broadcast. In the main event, John Cena defeated Batista in a Last Man Standing match to retain Raw's WWE Championship. In SmackDown's main match, which was an interpromotional match, Jack Swagger defeated Raw's Randy Orton in an Extreme Rules match to retain the World Heavyweight Championship.

The event received 182,000 pay-per-view buys, the same as the figure achieved by the 2009 Backlash event.

== Production ==
=== Background ===
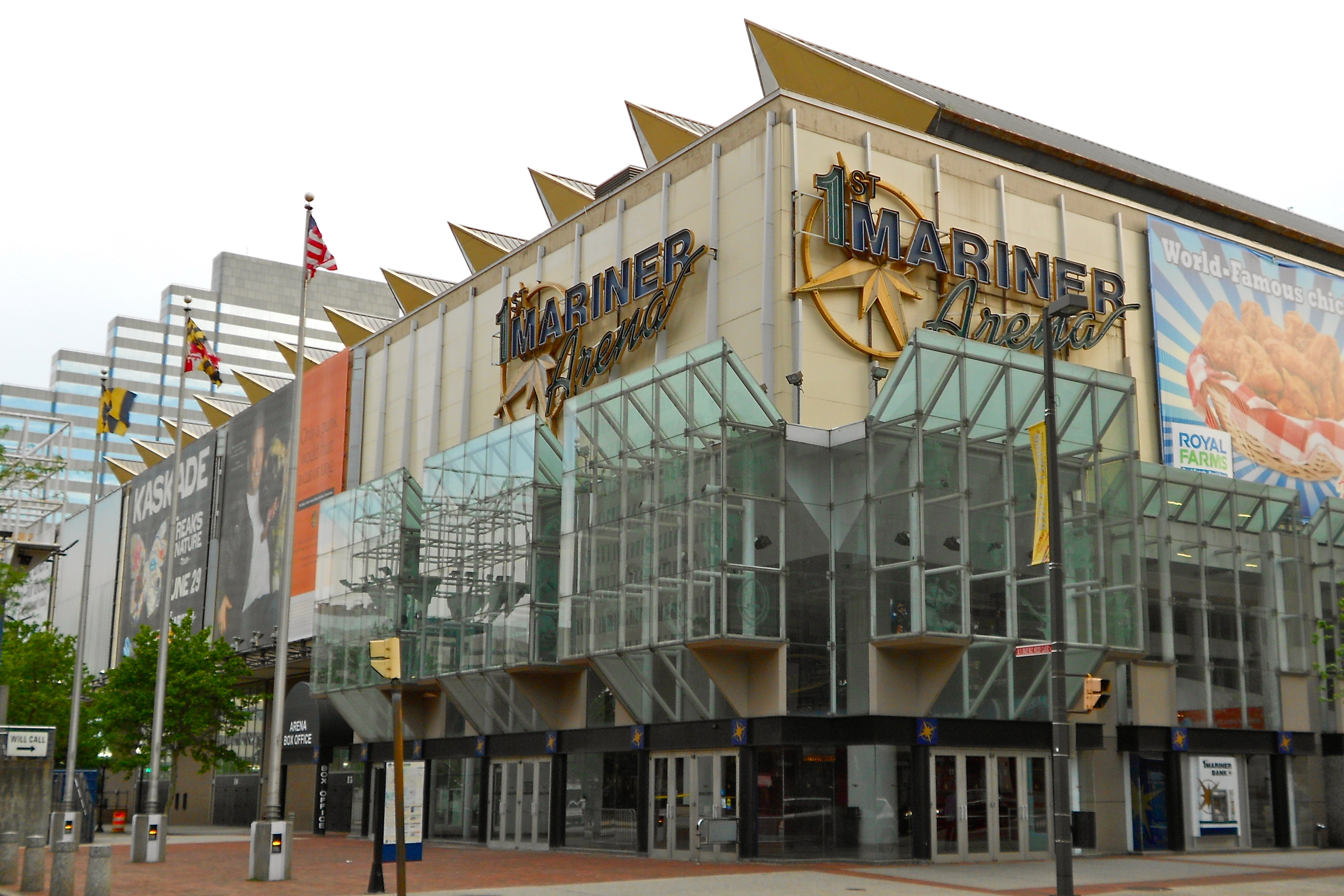
The second annual Extreme Rules was held at the 1st Mariner Arena in Baltimore, Maryland.

From 2005 to 2008, World Wrestling Entertainment (WWE) ran a professional wrestling pay-per-view (PPV) event entitled One Night Stand. While the first two events were originally a reunion show for the defunct Extreme Championship Wrestling (ECW) promotion, the assets of which WWE acquired in 2003, the concept of One Night Stand was that the event featured various matches that were contested under hardcore rules. In June 2009, WWE replaced One Night Stand with an event titled Extreme Rules, which continued the concept of featuring hardcore-based matches. ECW originally used the "extreme rules" term to describe the regulations for all of its matches; WWE adopted the term and has since used it in place of "hardcore match" or "hardcore rules".

A second Extreme Rules event was scheduled for April 25, 2010, at the 1st Mariner Arena in Baltimore, Maryland, featuring wrestlers from the Raw and SmackDown brands. While the inaugural 2009 event had originally been described as a continuation of the One Night Stand chronology, the 2010 Extreme Rules event was noted by WWE to be only the second event under a new chronology, thus establishing Extreme Rules as its own annual event. Although this was the second Extreme Rules event, it was the first to feature the titular Extreme Rules match, among other hardcore-based matches. With the 2010 event moved up to April, it also replaced Backlash as the post-WrestleMania event. The event took place on Tickets went on sale on March 6.

=== Storylines ===
The professional wrestling matches at Extreme Rules involved professional wrestlers performing as characters in scripted events pre-determined by the hosting promotion, WWE. Results were predetermined by WWE's writers on the Raw and SmackDown brands, while storylines were produced on WWE's weekly television shows, Monday Night Raw and SmackDown.

The main storyline from the Raw brand featured John Cena and Batista feuding over the WWE Championship. The feud had begun several months previously and been a feature of several pay-per-views, including WrestleMania XXVI, where Cena defeated Batista to win the championship. Following WrestleMania, on the April 5 episode of Raw, Batista attacked Cena after a match. It was announced that Batista would receive his rematch in a Last Man Standing match at Extreme Rules.

World Heavyweight Champion Jack Swagger from the SmackDown brand was scheduled to face Raw wrestler Randy Orton. Swagger won the Money in the Bank ladder match at WrestleMania, earning a contract for a guaranteed championship match at the time and place of his choosing. He used the contract on the April 2 episode of SmackDown, defeating Chris Jericho to win the World Heavyweight Championship after Jericho had been attacked by Edge. After a number one contender's match between Jericho and Edge ended in a double countout, Raw guest host David Hasselhoff announced that Swagger would face Orton, who had beaten Swagger on two occasions, in an Extreme Rules match.

Chris Jericho and Edge also had a scheduled match on the card. Edge returned from injury at the Royal Rumble, winning the Royal Rumble match, and earning a match for a championship of his choosing at WrestleMania. Edge elected to wrestle then-World Heavyweight Champion Jericho, but lost. On the following episode of SmackDown, after being refused a rematch, Edge attacked Jericho, allowing Jack Swagger to cash in his Money in the Bank contract and win the championship. After a number one contender's match between Jericho and Edge went to a double count-out, it was announced that they would face each other in a Steel Cage match.

The secondary rivalry from the Raw brand heading into Extreme Rules was between Triple H and Sheamus. Sheamus felt that Triple H was responsible for him losing the WWE Championship at the Elimination Chamber pay-per-view, and so challenged him to a match at WrestleMania, but lost. As a result, the following night on Raw, Sheamus attacked Triple H with a lead pipe, and it was announced that the two would meet in a Street Fight at Extreme Rules.

CM Punk and Rey Mysterio had been feuding for several months prior to Extreme Rules, which included Punk tormenting Mysterio in front of his wife and children. They wrestled at WrestleMania, with Mysterio winning, allowing him to avoid being forced to join Punk's stable, The Straight Edge Society. When inducting members into The Straight Edge Society, Punk shaved their hair while retaining long hair himself; as a result, Mysterio challenged him to a match at Extreme Rules with a stipulation that if Punk lost, he would have his head shaved.

Also announced for the card was a match for the Women's Championship between the champion, Michelle McCool, and Beth Phoenix. The feud began when Phoenix objected to SmackDown Consultant Vickie Guerrero aligning with Team Lay-Cool (McCool and Layla) and refusing to grant Phoenix a title match. After earning her championship match, Phoenix was attacked and humiliated on the April 23 episode of SmackDown by Team Lay-Cool, who hit her with an ironing board and drew on her while unconscious with lipstick to set up an Extreme Makeover match.

The final match on the card was between former tag team partners, Shad Gaspard and JTG. After Cryme Tyme lost a tag team match on the April 2 episode of SmackDown, Gaspard turned on JTG and attacked him, setting up a strap match between the two.

== Event ==
Other on-screen personnel
Role:	Name:
English commentators	Michael Cole
English commentators	Jerry Lawler
English commentators	Matt Striker
Spanish commentators	Carlos Cabrera
Spanish commentators	Hugo Savinovich
Backstage interviewer	Josh Mathews
Ring announcers	Justin Roberts
Ring announcers	Tony Chimel
Referees	Charles Robinson
Referees	Mike Chioda
Referees	Jack Doan

=== Dark match ===
Before the event went live on pay-per-view, Kofi Kingston defeated Dolph Ziggler in a dark match.

=== Preliminary matches ===
The actual pay-per-view opened with Sheamus attacking Triple H with a pipe.

Following the attack, Unified WWE Tag Team Champions ShoMiz (Big Show and United States Champion The Miz) came to the ring and complained about not having a match for the night, prompting SmackDown general manager Theodore Long to make a tag team gauntlet match for them against three other teams, with the winners earning a future tag team championship match. The first team was John Morrison and R-Truth, who lost when Morrison was disqualified for refusing to release a hold on Big Show by a five count. The next team was Montel Vontavious Porter and Mark Henry, who also lost after Miz pinned MVP following a KO Punch from Big Show. The final team was The Hart Dynasty, who won after Kidd pinned Miz following a Hart Attack.

Next, CM Punk faced Rey Mysterio, where if Punk lost he would have his head shaved bald. During the match, Luke Gallows and Serena attacked Mysterio on the outside and were banned from ringside. At the conclusion of the match, a masked man (Joey Mercury) attacked Mysterio with a Fallaway Powerbomb on the floor, which allowed Punk to perform a Go To Sleep on Mysterio and pin him.

After that, JTG wrestled Shad in a Strap match, where the objective was to touch all four turnbuckles while connected to the opponent. Shad used his size advantage to overpower JTG for most of the match. The conclusion of the match came when Shad had JTG on his back and began to tag corners, unaware that JTG was doing the same. After touching the third corner, JTG performed a Box Cutter on Shad and touched the final corner to win the match.

In the fourth match, Jack Swagger defended the World Heavyweight Championship against Randy Orton in an Extreme Rules match. At the conclusion of the match, Orton attempted an RKO on a chair but Swagger countered by throwing Orton through the chair. Swagger then performed a gutwrench powerbomb on Orton and pinned him to retain the World Heavyweight championship. After the match, Orton performed an RKO on Swagger on the floor.

When Orton was leaving the ring, Sheamus came out carrying a pipe for his street fight with Triple H. At the start of the match, Triple H attacked Sheamus and executed a spinebuster. Triple H attempted a Pedigree, but Sheamus countered and began to work over Triple H, executing a neckbreaker on the floor on Triple H. Back in the ring, Triple H performed a DDT on Sheamus, who executed an Irish Curse Backbreaker for a near-fall. On the entrance ramp, Triple H attacked Sheamus with a kendo stick and attempted a Pedigree, but Sheamus countered with a Back Body Drop onto the entrance ramp and executed a Brogue Kick. Back in the ring, Sheamus executed another Brogue Kick. As the referee checked on Triple H, he pushed him aside and in a final act of defiance performed the famous "crotch chop", taunting Sheamus. Sheamus executed two more Brogue Kicks before pinning Triple H to win the match. After this, he posed on top of the knocked out Triple H before leaving as the decisive winner. After, the officials tried to help Triple H backstage, but Sheamus came out again and executed a fifth Brogue Kick. Triple H was carried out on a stretcher and not seen again for almost 10 months.

Later, Michelle McCool defended the Women's Championship against Beth Phoenix in an Extreme Makeover match. At the conclusion of the match, Phoenix performed a Glam Slam on McCool and pinned her to win the title.

The next match was a Steel Cage match between Edge and Chris Jericho. When Jericho attempted to retrieve a chair, Edge stopped him but Jericho slammed the steel cage door on him. Jericho then attempted to strike Edge with the chair but Edge ducked and performed a spear on Jericho for a near-fall. Jericho then performed a Springboard Codebreaker on Edge for a near-fall. Edge performed another spear on Jericho to win the match.

=== Main event ===
In the main event, John Cena defended the WWE Championship against Batista in a Last Man Standing match. Cena performed an Attitude Adjustment onto a chair on Batista, who stood at an eight count. Batista performed two Spears on Cena, who stood at an eight count each time. Cena attempted the STF but Batista countered, knocking Cena through a table; Cena stood at a nine count. Batista threw Cena through the barricade but Cena stood at a nine count. Cena performed an Attitude Adjustment through the announce table on Batista, who stood at a nine count. Batista performed a Spinebuster through a table on Cena, who stood at a nine count. Batista performed a Batista Bomb on Cena, who stood at a nine count. Cena applied the STF on Batista, who stood at a nine count. Cena incapacitated Batista by tying Batista's feet to the ring post with duct tape. Batista was unable to answer the 10 count, allowing Cena to retain the title.

== Reception ==
In August 2010, WWE reported that the event had received 182,000 pay-per-view buys, down on what the previous year's event had.

== Aftermath ==
Because The Hart Dynasty defeated ShoMiz (Big Show and The Miz) at Extreme Rules, they received a tag team championship match the next night on Raw, which they won. After the match, Big Show turned face and punched The Miz right through his jaw. Big Show moved to the SmackDown brand and became the number one contender for the World Heavyweight Championship at Over the Limit.

The feud between CM Punk and Rey Mysterio continued after Extreme Rules. A match combining the stipulations of their matches from Extreme Rules and WrestleMania XXVI was announced for Over the Limit, in which if Mysterio lost, he would have to join the Straight Edge Society, and if Punk lost, he would have to shave his head. At Over The Limit, Mysterio defeated Punk and forced Punk to shave his head.

After Extreme Rules, Randy Orton started a feud with Edge. A match was set up between the two at Over The Limit, ending in a double countout.

Jack Swagger entered into a program with the Big Show, against whom Swagger defended the World Heavyweight Championship at Over The Limit. At Over the Limit, Swagger lost via disqualification, retaining the title.

Triple H was sidelined for the rest of the year and came back in February 2011 to confront The Undertaker. A week later when he returned, he attacked Sheamus to end the feud.

The feud between Batista and John Cena continued after Extreme Rules. Batista earned a rematch for the WWE Championship at Over the Limit by defeating Randy Orton and Sheamus in a number one contender's match, but Cena defeated Batista at the event in an "I Quit" Match. The next night, Raw general manager Bret Hart told Batista he had to qualify for the WWE Championship Fatal-4-Way at the eponymous pay-per-view, but he refused and lost to Randy Orton by forfeit. Batista then quit WWE.

After capturing the WWE Women's Championship, Beth Phoenix tore her ACL on the May 6 episode of Superstars during a singles match against Rosa Mendes, which Phoenix won with a roll-up. Phoenix eventually dropped the WWE Women's Championship to Layla in a 2-on-1 handicap match on the May 14 episode of SmackDown. After being out of action for six months, Phoenix returned at Survivor Series to save Natalya from an attack by LayCool. In December at TLC, Phoenix and Natalya defeated LayCool in a Divas Tag Team Tables match.

This was the final Extreme Rules event held before the original World Tag Team Championship was deactivated in August in favor of the WWE Tag Team Championship, which became available to both brands; since WrestleMania 25 in April 2009, both titles were held and defended together across all brands as the Unified WWE Tag Team Championship. It would also be the final Extreme Rules event held before the original WWE Women's Championship was deactivated in September in favor of the WWE Divas Championship, which also became available to both brands. In April 2011, the promotion ceased using its full name with the "WWE" abbreviation becoming an orphaned initialism.

== Results ==
No.	Results	Stipulations	Times
1^{D}	Kofi Kingston defeated Dolph Ziggler by pinfall	Singles match	—
2	The Hart Dynasty (Tyson Kidd and David Hart Smith) (with Natalya and Bret Hart) won by last eliminating ShoMiz (The Miz and Big Show)	Gauntlet match	5:18
3	CM Punk (with Luke Gallows and Serena) defeated Rey Mysterio by pinfall	Hair match Had CM Punk lost, he would have had his hair shaved.	15:57
4	JTG defeated Shad Gaspard	Strap match	4:41
5	Jack Swagger (c) defeated Randy Orton by pinfall	Extreme Rules match for the World Heavyweight Championship	13:59
6	Sheamus defeated Triple H by pinfall	Street Fight	15:46
7	Beth Phoenix defeated Michelle McCool (c) (with Vickie Guerrero and Layla) by pinfall	Extreme Makeover match for the WWE Women's Championship	6:32
8	Edge defeated Chris Jericho by pinfall	Steel Cage match	19:59
9	John Cena (c) defeated Batista	Last Man Standing match for the WWE Championship	24:34
(c) / – the champion(s) heading into the match; D / – this was a dark match

=== Gauntlet match ===
Draw	Wrestler	Order	Eliminated by
1	ShoMiz (The Miz and Big Show)	3	The Hart Dynasty
2	John Morrison and R-Truth	1	ShoMiz
3	The World's Strongest Tag Team (Montel Vontavious Porter and Mark Henry)	2	ShoMiz
4	The Hart Dynasty (Tyson Kidd and David Hart Smith)	Winners	N/A
