= Night of Champions (2013) =

WWE pay-per-view event

- Promotional poster featuring Kofi Kingston hoisting the WWE Intercontinental Championship.
- Promotion: WWE
- Date: September 15, 2013
- City: Detroit, Michigan
- Venue: Joe Louis Arena
- Attendance: 10,500
- Buy rate: 175,000

Pay-per-view chronology
← Previous; SummerSlam	Next → Battleground

Night of Champions chronology
← Previous; 2012	Next → 2014

The 2013 Night of Champions was a professional wrestling pay-per-view (PPV) event produced by WWE. It was the seventh annual Night of Champions and took place on September 15, 2013, at the Joe Louis Arena in Detroit, Michigan. The theme of the event was that all six of WWE's active main roster championships at the time were defended.

Nine matches were contested at the event, including one on the Kickoff pre-show. In the main event, Daniel Bryan defeated Randy Orton to win the WWE Championship. In other prominent matches, Rob Van Dam defeated World Heavyweight Champion Alberto Del Rio via disqualification thus Del Rio retained as titles do not change hands on disqualification unless stipulated, and Curtis Axel and Paul Heyman defeated CM Punk in a No Disqualification Handicap Elimination match.

The event received 175,000 pay-per-view buys, down from the last year's event of 189,000. This was WWE's last pay-per-view event to take place at the Joe Louis Arena before its closure in 2017 with future WWE events in Detroit held at the Little Caesars Arena. This was the final Night of Champions to broadcast exclusively via traditional PPV outlets due to the launch of the WWE Network streaming service in 2014. This was also the final Night of Champions to feature the previous version of the World Heavyweight Championship, which was unified with the WWE Championship in December.

== Production ==
=== Background ===
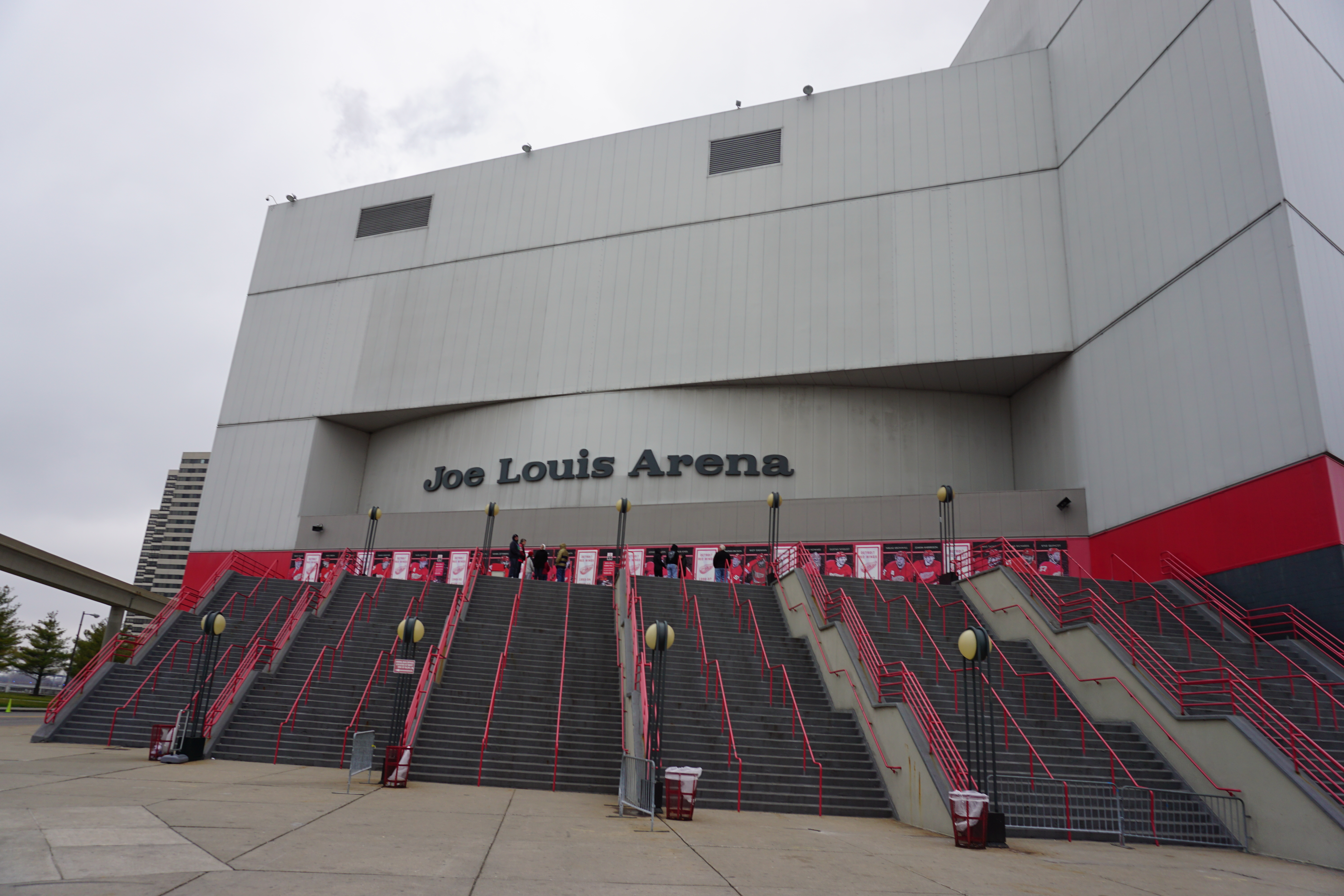
The seventh annual Night of Champions was held at the Joe Louis Arena in Detroit, Michigan.

Night of Champions is a professional wrestling pay-per-view (PPV) event produced by WWE since 2007, with the event based around championship matches. The seventh event was held on September 15, 2013, at the Joe Louis Arena in Detroit, Michigan. As per the theme of the event, every active championship promoted on WWE's main roster at the time was defended, which included the WWE Championship, the World Heavyweight Championship, the Intercontinental Championship, the United States Championship, the WWE Tag Team Championship, and the WWE Divas Championship.

=== Storylines ===
The card consisted of nine matches, including one on the Kickoff pre-show, that resulted from scripted storylines. Results were predetermined by WWE's writers, while storylines were produced on WWE's weekly television shows, Raw and SmackDown.

Following his win over John Cena at SummerSlam, Daniel Bryan lost the WWE Championship when special guest referee and chief operating officer Triple H attacked Bryan, allowing Randy Orton to cash in his Money in the Bank briefcase to win the championship. Triple H and the McMahons stated that it was "best for business" because Bryan did not "fit the mold" to be WWE Champion. Naming Orton the new "face of WWE", they also formed an alliance with The Shield. Leading up to Night of Champions, Bryan was forced to compete in several challenging matches, including a Steel Cage match against Wade Barrett, a gauntlet match against all three members of The Shield, and a match with Big Show. After defeating Dean Ambrose on the September 9 episode of Raw, Bryan was again assaulted by The Shield and Orton.

On the August 26 episode of Raw, AJ Lee interrupted the celebration over Brie Bella's victory in a SummerSlam rematch against Natalya, berating the cast of Total Divas, calling them "interchangeable" and "expendable" and stating that they were not good enough to be wrestlers, so they went into reality TV. On the September 2 episode of Raw, AJ Lee interfered in a triple threat match between Natalya, Naomi, and Brie Bella, which was to determine the number one contender for her Divas Championship. As a result, Stephanie McMahon scheduled AJ to defend her Divas Championship in a fatal four-way match against Natalya, Naomi, and Brie Bella at Night of Champions.

On the August 5 episode of Raw, Rob Van Dam defeated World Heavyweight Champion Alberto Del Rio in a non-title match after Ricardo Rodriguez's interference backfired. After the match, Del Rio attacked Rodriguez for his actions. Two weeks later, Rodriguez returned to inform Del Rio that he was now representing Van Dam. Van Dam continued to attack Del Rio, both on Raw and SmackDown, and on the August 26 episode of Raw, Van Dam won another non-title match over Del Rio due to a distraction by Rodriguez, earning Van Dam a World Heavyweight Championship match against Del Rio at Night of Champions. On the September 6 episode of SmackDown, Del Rio cost Van Dam a non-title match against Randy Orton, and attacked him after the match. The following week, Vickie Guerrero forced Rodriguez to face Del Rio. After winning the match, Del Rio put Rodriguez in the cross armbreaker until Van Dam made the save.

After being defeated by Brock Lesnar at SummerSlam, CM Punk continued his feud with Paul Heyman, thus starting another one with Intercontinental Champion Curtis Axel by attacking him the next night on Raw. Four days later on SmackDown, Axel challenged Punk to a match, which Punk accepted. On the August 26 episode of Raw, Punk defeated Axel and by vote of WWE's fans, Heyman was forced to face Punk in the ring, but Axel interfered and helped Heyman attack Punk. Brad Maddox granted Punk's wish of facing Heyman by giving him a No Disqualification Handicap Elimination match at Night of Champions against Axel and Heyman.

On the September 9 episode of Raw, a tag team turmoil match was scheduled for the Night of Champions Kickoff pre-show, with the winners challenging The Shield (Roman Reigns and Seth Rollins) for the WWE Tag Team Championship later in the night.

On the September 13 episode of SmackDown, Dolph Ziggler faced Dean Ambrose for an opportunity at the United States Championship at Night of Champions. Although Reigns and Rollins interfered when Ziggler was about to win, he was still given the championship match.

== Event ==
Other on-screen personnel
Role:	Name:
English Commentators	Michael Cole
English Commentators	Jerry Lawler
English Commentators	John "Bradshaw" Layfield
Spanish Commentators	Marcelo Rodriguez
Spanish Commentators	Carlos Cabrera
Interviewer	Tony Dawson
Ring announcers	Lilian Garcia
Ring announcers	Justin Roberts
Referees	Charles Robinson
Referees	Mike Chioda
Referees	John Cone
Referees	Marc Harris
Referees	Rod Zapata
Referees	Chad Patton
Referees	Scott Armstrong
Pre-show Panel	Josh Mathews
Pre-show Panel	Alex Riley
Pre-show Panel	Booker T
Pre-show Panel	Santino Marella

=== Pre-show ===
During the Night of Champions Kickoff pre-show, a tag team turmoil match was held, which The Prime Time Players (Darren Young and Titus O'Neil) won by last eliminating The Real Americans (Antonio Cesaro and Jack Swagger) to become the number one contenders for the WWE Tag Team Championship later at the event.

=== Preliminary matches ===
The pay-per-view started with Triple H promising that there would be no interference in the WWE Championship match. He was interrupted by Paul Heyman and the Intercontinental Champion, Curtis Axel, who requested that their handicap match against CM Punk be cancelled. Triple H not only refused and but also decided that the first person he sees backstage would receive an immediate title shot at Axel's Intercontinental Championship. Triple H headed to the back and ran into Kofi Kingston, who was sent to the ring to challenge Axel. Axel pinned Kingston after a Hangman's Facebuster to retain the title.

After this, AJ Lee defended her WWE Divas Championship against Natalya, Naomi, and Brie Bella in a fatal four-way match. AJ forced Natalya to submit to the Black Widow to retain the title.

In the third match, Alberto Del Rio defended the World Heavyweight Championship against Rob Van Dam, who was accompanied by Del Rio's former ring announcer, Ricardo Rodriguez. Van Dam won by disqualification after Del Rio refused to release the Cross Armbreaker by a 5 count. After the match, Del Rio tried to attack Van Dam with a chair but Rodriguez took the chair, allowing Van Dam to execute a DDT and a Van Daminator on Del Rio.

Next, The Miz wrestled Fandango. Miz forced Fandango to submit to the Figure Four Leglock to win the match.

In the fifth match, CM Punk faced Curtis Axel and Paul Heyman in a No Disqualification Handicap Elimination match. Midway through the match, Punk hit Axel with a kendo stick, executed a GTS and forced him to submit to the Anaconda Vise. Punk then chased Heyman, his remaining opponent, through the arena and taunted him. Heyman hugged Punk but was attacked with a kendo stick. Ryback interfered, tackling Punk through a table positioned in the corner before placing Heyman on top of Punk, allowing Heyman to score a pinfall and win the match.

After that, Dean Ambrose defended the WWE United States Championship against Dolph Ziggler. Ambrose pinned Ziggler after Dirty Deeds to retain the title.

In the penultimate match, the other two members of The Shield, Seth Rollins and Roman Reigns, defended the WWE Tag Team Championship against The Prime Time Players (Darren Young and Titus O'Neil). In the end, Reigns performed a Spear on O'Neil, allowing Rollins to score a pinfall to retain the titles.

=== Main event ===
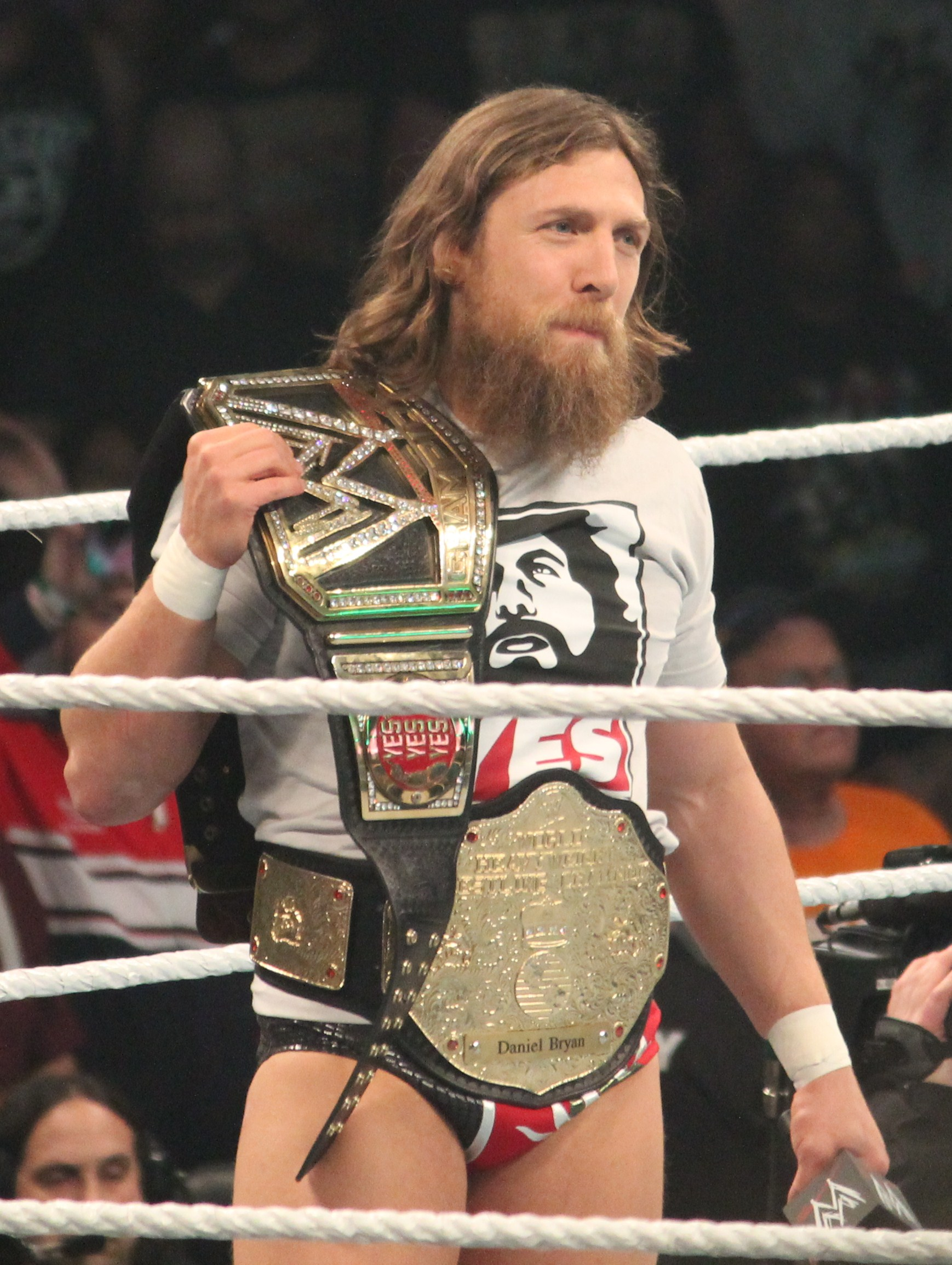
Daniel Bryan won the WWE Championship (over his shoulder) for the second time.

In the main event, Randy Orton defended the WWE Championship against Daniel Bryan. Orton attempted an RKO but Bryan countered and performed a Dropkick on Orton, knocking him into the referee. Bryan applied the Yes! Lock but Orton touched the ring ropes, forcing Bryan to release the hold. In the end, Orton attempted an RKO but Bryan countered into a Backslide, which Orton countered. Bryan pinned Orton after a Running Knee to win the title.

== Aftermath ==
The next night on Raw, Daniel Bryan was stripped of the WWE Championship by Triple H because of a fast count by referee Scott Armstrong; Triple H accused Bryan of having conspired with the referee and punished Bryan more by putting him in a match with Roman Reigns; though Bryan won, he was again assaulted by the rest of The Shield (Reigns, Seth Rollins, and Dean Ambrose) and Randy Orton. Orton put Bryan's head in between the folds of a chair, but before he could further injure Bryan, most face wrestlers ran to the ring and attacked Orton and The Shield, with Bryan finishing them off with a high knee to Rollins.

On the September 20 episode of SmackDown, Triple H gave Rob Van Dam a rematch with Alberto Del Rio at Battleground for the World Heavyweight Championship. Immediately afterwards, Del Rio viciously assaulted Van Dam backstage.

CM Punk continued to feud with Paul Heyman and his newest client Ryback. On the September 23 episode of Raw, a match between the two was scheduled for Battleground.

AJ Lee continued her feud with the members of the Total Divas cast. On the September 23 episode of Raw, Brie Bella pinned Lee during a 10-diva tag team match, leading to a title match at Battleground.

This was the final Night of Champions to broadcast exclusively via traditional PPV outlets due to the launch of the WWE Network streaming service in February 2014. It was also the last to feature the previous version of the World Heavyweight Championship, which was unified with the WWE Championship in December at TLC: Tables, Ladders & Chairs; the World Heavyweight Championship was immediately retired while the WWE Championship became known as the WWE World Heavyweight Championship. This was WWE's last pay-per-view event to take place at the Joe Louis Arena before its closure in 2017 with future WWE events in Detroit held at the Little Caesars Arena.

== Results ==
No.	Results	Stipulations	Times
1^{P}	The Prime Time Players (Darren Young and Titus O'Neil) won by last eliminating The Real Americans (Antonio Cesaro and Jack Swagger) (with Zeb Colter)	Tag team turmoil match to determine the number one contenders to the WWE Tag Team Championship	11:14
2	Curtis Axel (c) (with Paul Heyman) defeated Kofi Kingston by pinfall	Singles match for the WWE Intercontinental Championship	13:56
3	AJ Lee (c) defeated Brie Bella, Naomi, and Natalya by submission	Fatal four-way match for the WWE Divas Championship	5:40
4	Rob Van Dam (with Ricardo Rodriguez) defeated Alberto Del Rio (c) by disqualification	Singles match for the World Heavyweight Championship	13:07
5	The Miz defeated Fandango (with Summer Rae) by submission	Singles match	7:49
6	Curtis Axel and Paul Heyman defeated CM Punk by pinfall	No Disqualification Handicap Elimination match	15:22
7	Dean Ambrose (c) defeated Dolph Ziggler by pinfall	Singles match for the WWE United States Championship	9:37
8	The Shield (Roman Reigns and Seth Rollins) (c) defeated The Prime Time Players (Darren Young and Titus O'Neil) by pinfall	Tag team match for the WWE Tag Team Championship	7:30
9	Daniel Bryan defeated Randy Orton (c) by pinfall	Singles match for the WWE Championship	17:38
(c) / – the champion(s) heading into the match; P / – the match was broadcast on the pre-show

=== Tag Team Turmoil match ===
Order	Team	Elimination	Eliminated by	Times
1	3MB (Heath Slater and Drew McIntyre) (with Jinder Mahal)	1	Tons of Funk	1:31
2	Tons of Funk (Brodus Clay and Tensai)	2	The Real Americans	4:53
3	The Real Americans (Antonio Cesaro and Jack Swagger) (with Zeb Colter)	4	The Prime Time Players	9:11
4	The Usos (Jimmy Uso and Jey Uso)	3	The Real Americans	11:03
Winners	The Prime Time Players (Darren Young and Titus O'Neil)			11:03
