= Night of Champions (2014) =

WWE pay-per-view and livestreaming event

- Promotional poster featuring John Cena and Brock Lesnar with the WWE World Heavyweight Championship
- Promotion: WWE
- Date: September 21, 2014
- City: Nashville, Tennessee
- Venue: Bridgestone Arena
- Attendance: 11,000
- Buy rate: 48,000 (excluding WWE Network views)
- Tagline: Rematch. Resolve. Redemption.

WWE event chronology
← Previous; NXT TakeOver: Fatal 4-Way	Next → Hell in a Cell

Night of Champions chronology
← Previous; 2013	Next → 2015

The 2014 Night of Champions was a professional wrestling pay-per-view (PPV) and livestreaming event produced by WWE. It was the eighth annual Night of Champions and took place on September 21, 2014, at the Bridgestone Arena in Nashville, Tennessee. The theme of the event was that all five of WWE's active main roster championships at the time were defended.

Eight matches were contested at the event. Of the five championships contested, three changed hands. The main event saw John Cena defeat Brock Lesnar by disqualification, after Money in the Bank holder Seth Rollins interfered in the match by attacking Cena, thus Lesnar retained the WWE World Heavyweight Championship as titles do not change hands by disqualification unless stipulated. The event also saw AJ Lee defeat defending champion Paige and Nikki Bella to win her record-tying third WWE Divas Championship. This was also WWE's last PPV and livestreaming event to feature Justin Roberts as a ring announcer as he would be released the following month.

This was the first Night of Champions to livestream on the WWE Network, which launched in February. The event had 48,000 pay-per-view buys (excluding WWE Network views), down from the previous year's 175,000 buys.

== Production ==
=== Background ===
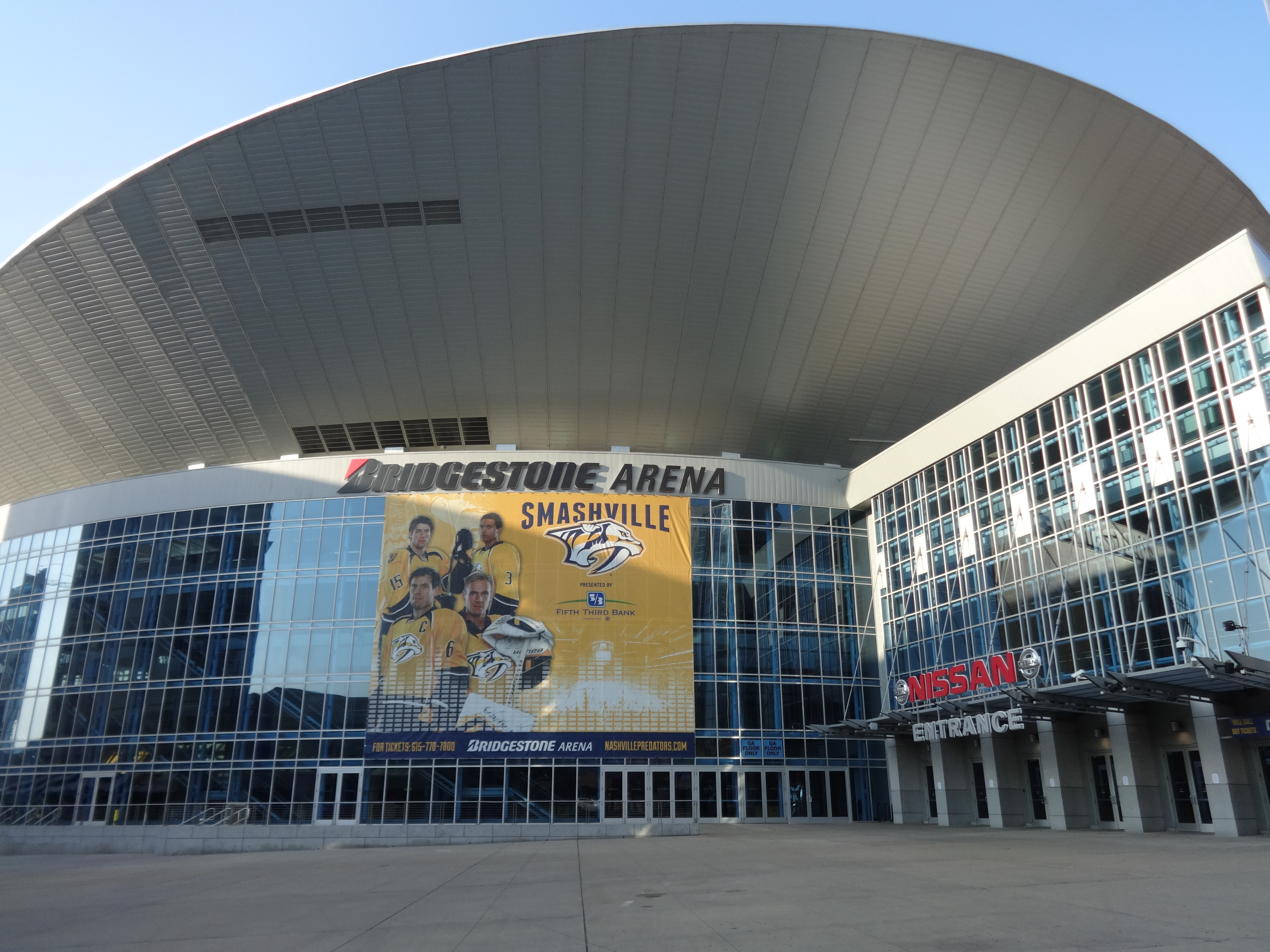
The eighth annual Night of Champions was held at the Bridgestone Arena in Nashville, Tennessee.

Night of Champions is a professional wrestling pay-per-view (PPV) event produced by WWE since 2007, with the event based around championship matches. Announced on April 16, 2014, the eighth event was scheduled to be held on September 21, 2014, at the Bridgestone Arena in Nashville, Tennessee. In addition to traditional PPV, it was the first Night of Champions to livestream on the WWE Network, which launched earlier that year in February. Tickets went on sale on June 28. As per the theme of the event, every active championship promoted on WWE's main roster at the time was defended, which included the WWE World Heavyweight Championship, the Intercontinental Championship, the United States Championship, the WWE Tag Team Championship, and the WWE Divas Championship.

=== Storylines ===
The card consisted of eight matches that resulted from scripted storylines. Results were predetermined by WWE's writers, while storylines were produced on WWE's weekly television shows, Raw and SmackDown.

At SummerSlam, Brock Lesnar defeated John Cena to win the WWE World Heavyweight Championship. On the August 19 episode of Main Event, a rematch was scheduled for Night of Champions.

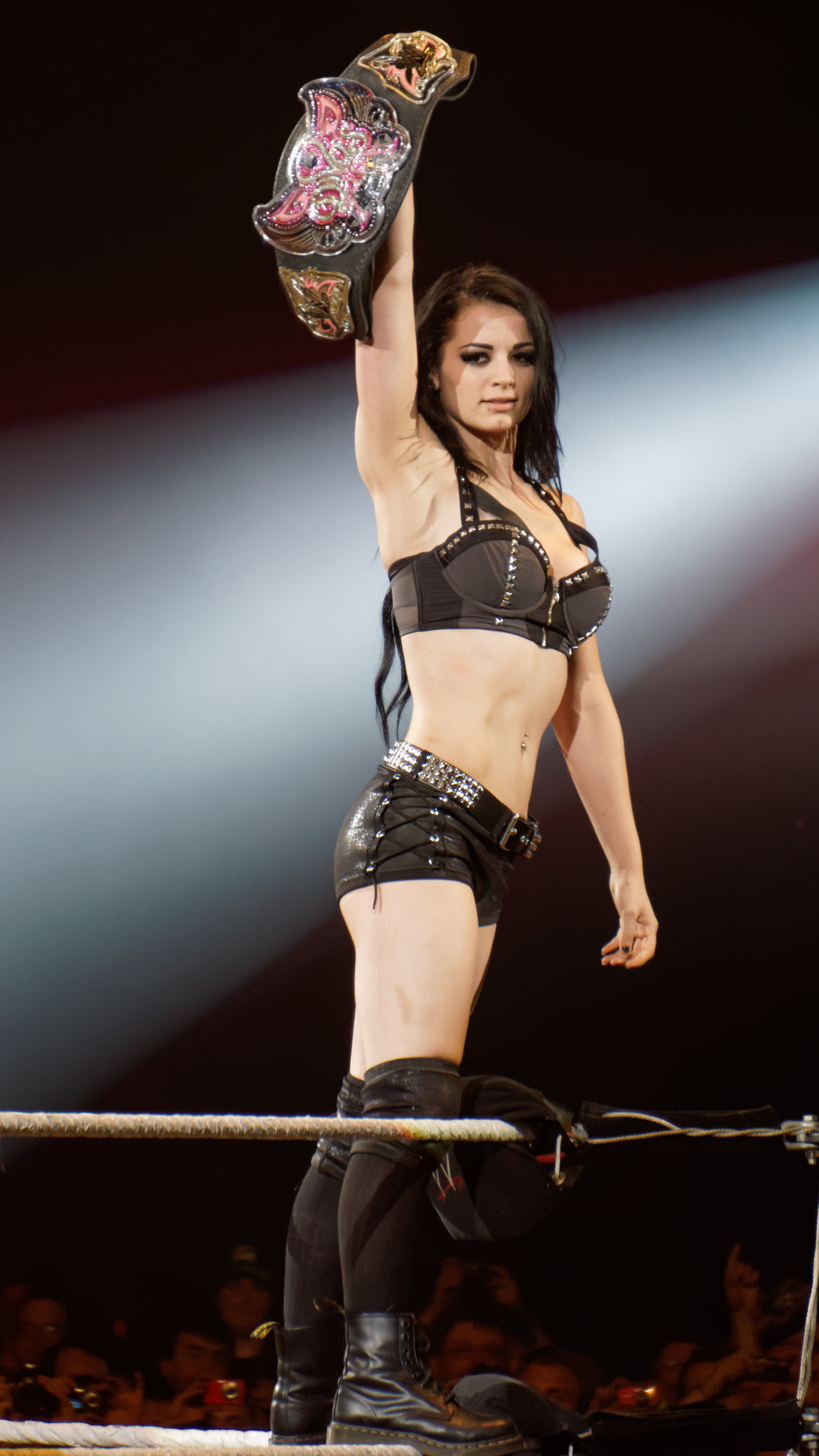
Paige as Divas Champion.

At SummerSlam, Paige defeated AJ Lee to win the WWE Divas Championship. On the September 1 episode of Raw, Stephanie McMahon granted Nikki Bella a title match at Night of Champions, but they were interrupted by AJ, who reminded Stephanie of her rematch. On September 5, Stephanie decided that Paige would defend the title against AJ and Nikki in a triple threat match.

On the same show, Dolph Ziggler, who at SummerSlam had defeated The Miz for the WWE Intercontinental Championship, lost a rematch by countout. On the September 2 episode of Main Event, another title defense against The Miz was scheduled for the event.

On the August 25 episode of Raw, Cesaro by defeated Rob Van Dam and thus became the number one contender for the WWE United States Championship, held by Sheamus.

On the August 18 episode of Raw, Mark Henry attacked Rusev, who retaliated on the September 1 episode, by attacking Henry during a match pitting Henry and Big Show against Erick Rowan and Luke Harper. On the September 5 episode of SmackDown, Henry challenged Rusev to a match at Night of Champions, with Lana accepting on Rusev's behalf.

On the August 18 episode of Raw, Gold and Stardust defeated WWE Tag Team Champions The Usos (Jey Uso and Jimmy Uso) in a non-title match. A week later, Goldust and Stardust won a title match by count-out and attacked The Usos after the match. Goldust and Stardust attacked The Usos again after their respective matches against Jey and Jimmy on the following episodes of SmackDown and Raw, resulting in Jey Uso injuring his leg. On September 8, the Usos were scheduled to defend the title against Gold and Stardust at the event.

On the September 1 episode of Raw, Chris Jericho insulted Randy Orton on his Highlight Reel show. A week later, Orton attacked Jericho who was being medically treated after losing to Bray Wyatt in a Steel Cage match. On September 9, a match between Jericho and Orton was scheduled for the event.

== Event ==
Other on-screen personnel
Role:	Name:
English Commentators	Michael Cole
English Commentators	Jerry Lawler
English Commentators	John "Bradshaw" Layfield
English Commentators	Tyler Hubbard (Miz vs. Ziggler)
English Commentators	Brian Kelley (Miz vs. Ziggler)
Spanish commentator	Carlos Cabrera
Interviewer	Byron Saxton
Ring announcer	Lilian Garcia
Ring announcer	Justin Roberts
Referee	Mike Chioda
Pre-show panel	Renee Young
Pre-show panel	Booker T
Pre-show panel	Big Show
Pre-show panel	Alex Riley

=== Pre-show ===
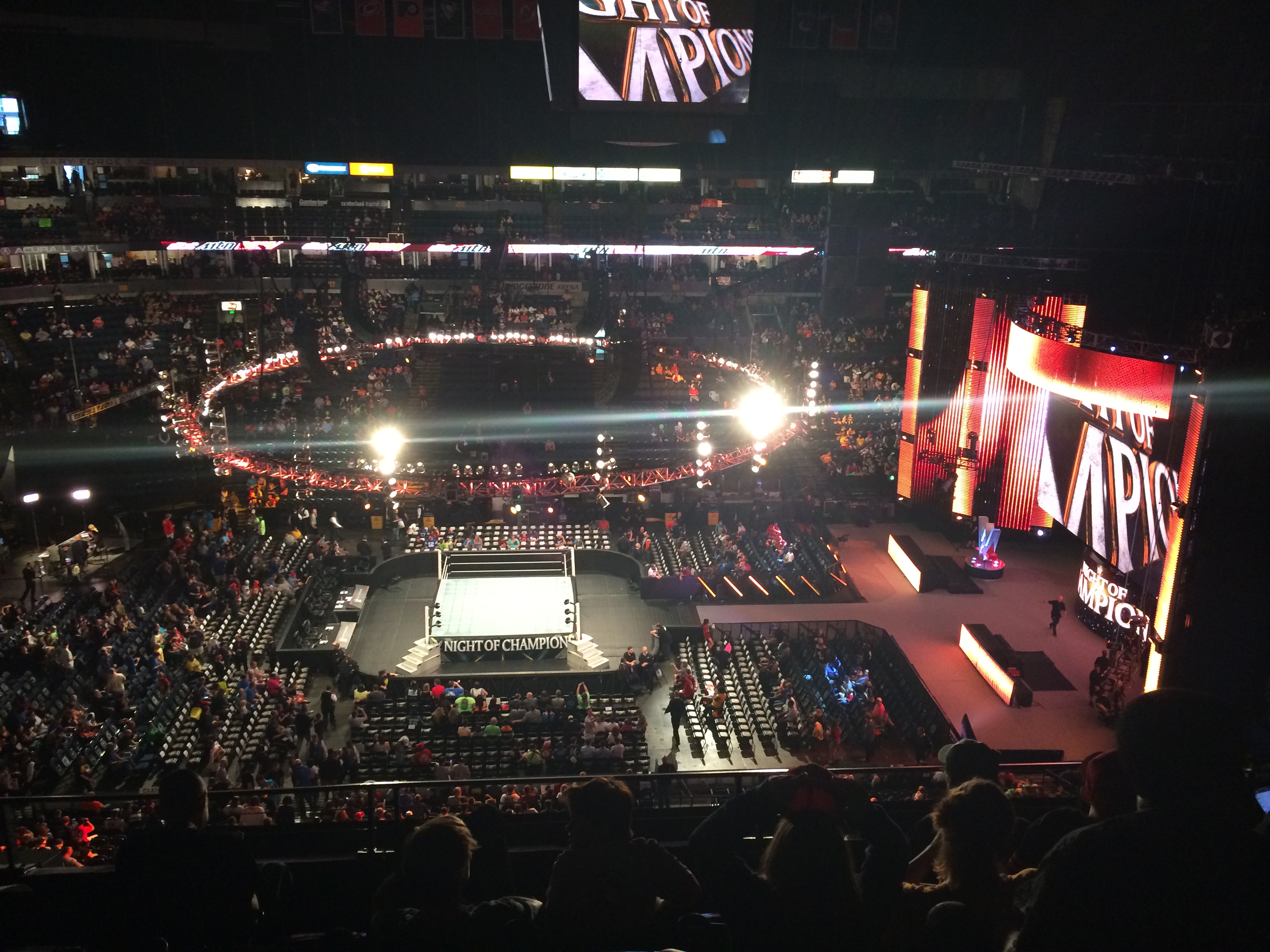
The Bridgestone Arena interior prior to the pay-per-view beginning.

On the pre-show, Christian returned to host the "Peep" Show, with Chris Jericho as the show's guest. Analysis was provided by a pre-show panel of Booker T, Alex Riley, Big Show, and Renee Young.

=== Preliminary matches ===
The actual pay-per-view opened with The Usos (Jey Uso and Jimmy Uso) defending the WWE Tag Team Championship against Goldust and Stardust. The Usos dominated throughout the match until Jey attempted a Samoan splash on Stardust but landed on Stardust's raised knee. Stardust immediately rolled up Jey for a pinfall to win the title.

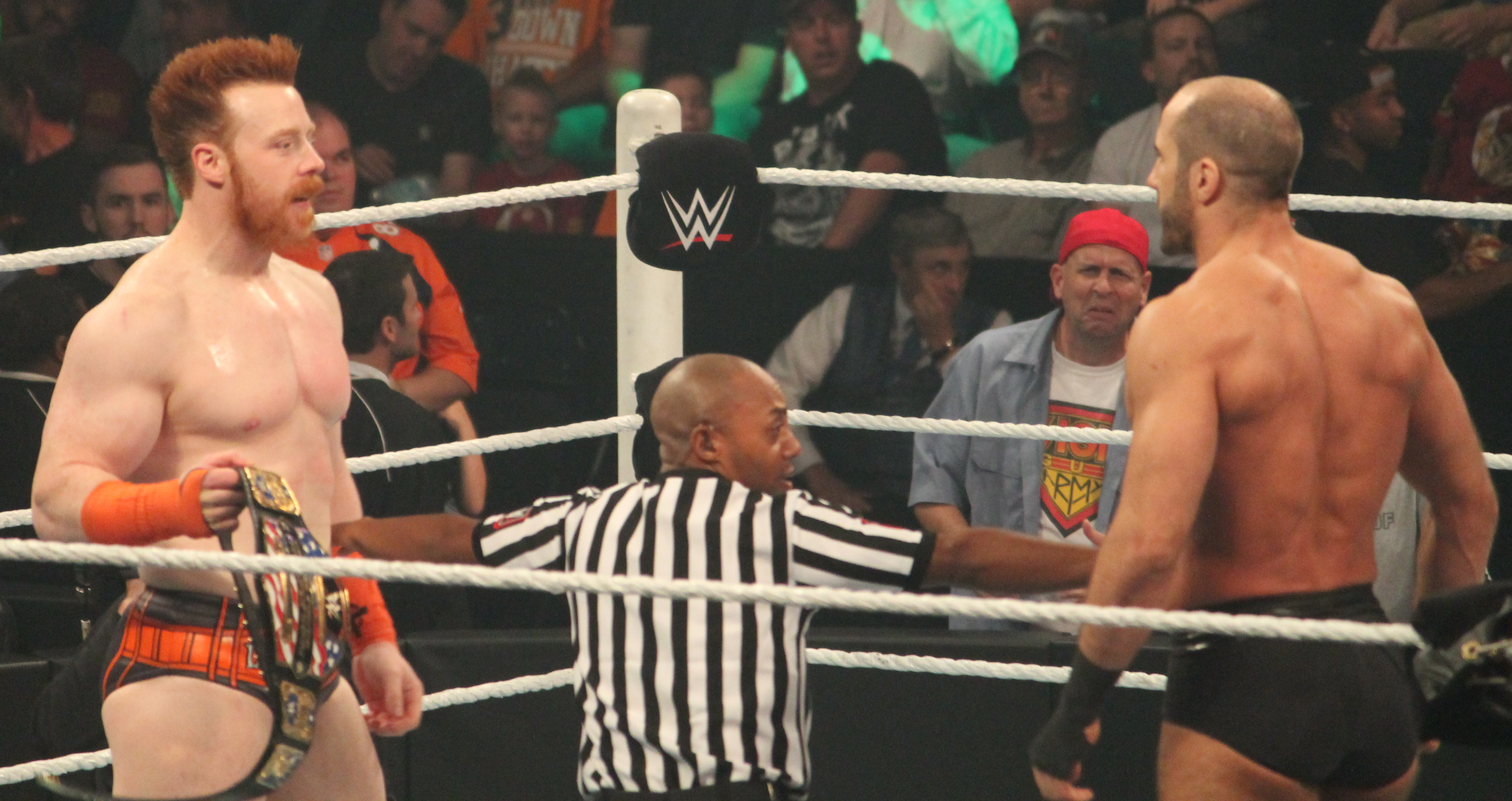
Sheamus defending his United States Championship against Cesaro

Next, Sheamus defended the United States Championship against Cesaro. In the end, after an evenly contested match, Sheamus executed a Brogue Kick on Cesaro to retain the title.

After that, Dolph Ziggler (accompanied by R-Ziggler) defended the Intercontinental Championship against The Miz (accompanied by Damien Mizdow). Miz rolled up Ziggler while holding his tights to win the match and his fourth Intercontinental Championship.

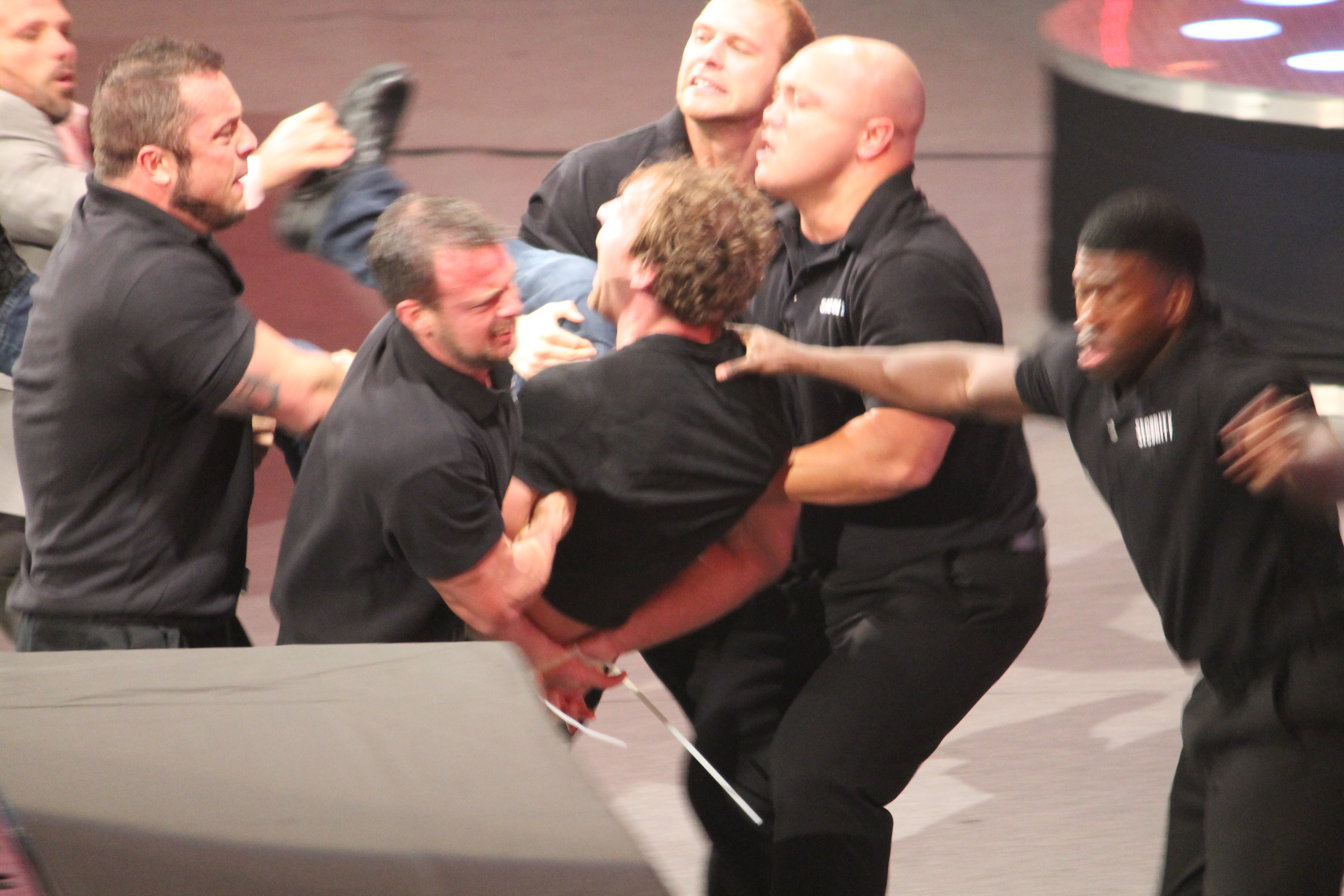
Dean Ambrose being carried out of the arena after attacking Seth Rollins.

The next match on the card was scheduled between Roman Reigns and Seth Rollins. The match was cancelled the day before the event, as Reigns was rushed to the hospital for surgery on an incarcerated hernia, and was deemed unable to compete. Rollins walked to the ring to claim a victory against via forfeit. While in the ring, Dean Ambrose attacked Rollins. The Authority emerged from backstage to separate the two and restore order. Security later tied Ambrose's hands behind his back and escorted him out of the arena.

In the fifth match, before the match Lillian Garcia sang the American Anthem. Rusev (accompanied by Lana) faced Mark Henry. During the match, Henry executed The World's Strongest Slam, but couldn't capitalize. In the end, Henry submitted to The Accolade.

In the next match, Randy Orton faced Chris Jericho. In the end, Jericho executed a Codebreaker on Orton for a nearfall. Jericho dove off the top rope but Orton countered into a mid-air RKO and pinned Jericho to win the match.

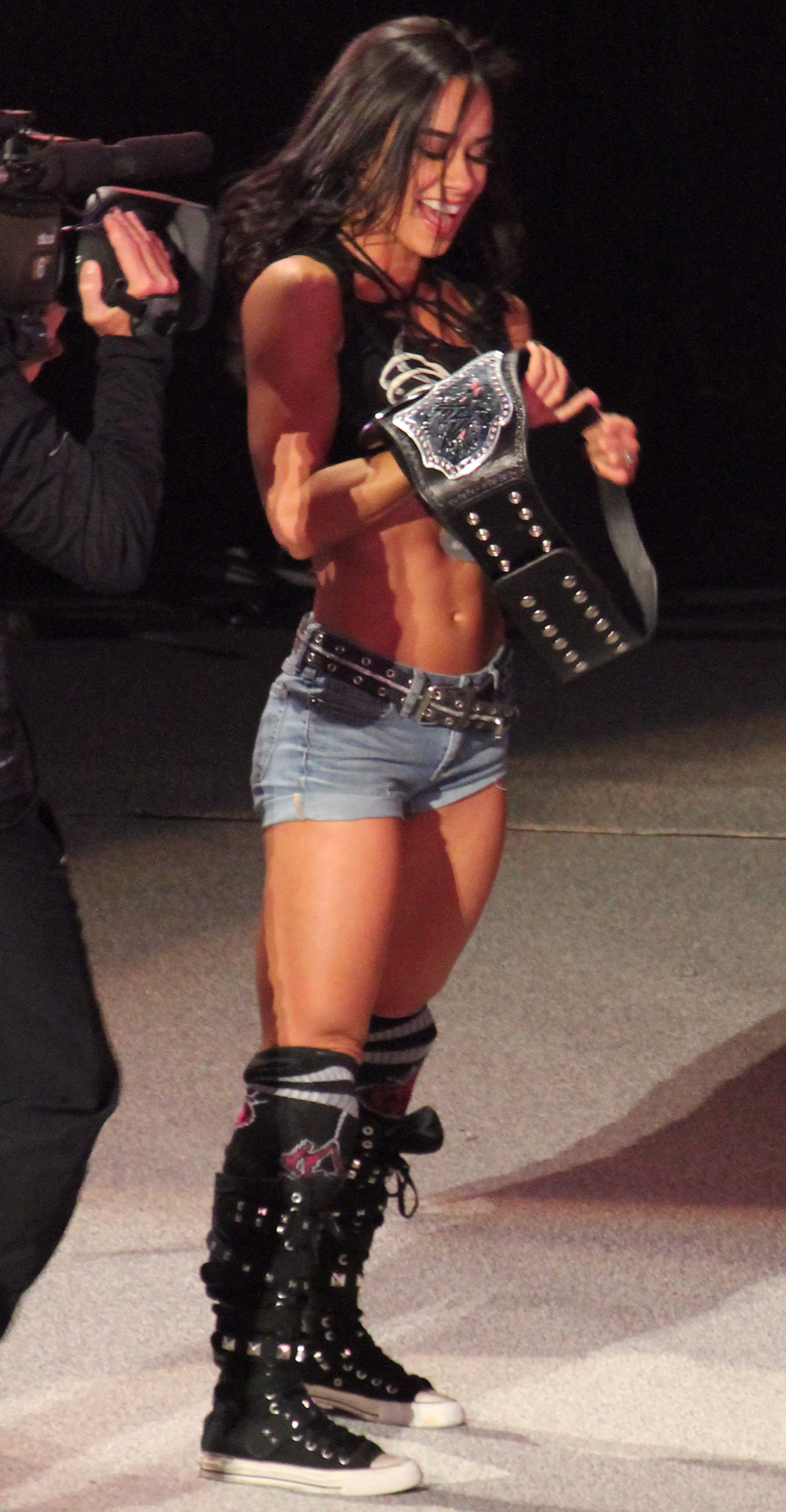
AJ Lee's victory in a triple threat match earned AJ her record third and final WWE Divas Championship reign.

In the penultimate match, Paige defended the Divas Championship in a triple threat match against Nikki Bella and AJ Lee. After leaving Bella unconscious out of the ring, Lee forced Paige to submit to the Black Widow to win the title. With this win, Lee tied the record for most reigns alongside Eve Torres with three.

=== Main event ===
In the main event, Brock Lesnar (accompanied by Paul Heyman) defended the WWE World Heavyweight Championship against John Cena. Cena executed an Attitude Adjustment on Lesnar, who kicked out at one. Lesnar then applied the Kimura Lock four times, but Cena reached the ropes to break the submission each time. Later in the match, Cena performed a second Attitude Adjustment on Lesnar for a nearfall. Cena later applied the STF, however, Lesnar countered. As Lesnar applied a fifth Kimura Lock on Cena, Cena escaped by repeatedly driving Lesnar into the corner. Cena then executed a third Attitude Adjustment on Lesnar and applied a second STF, only for Lesnar to reach the ropes. Cena applied a third STF, but Lesnar again reached the ropes. Cena then locked Lesnar in a fourth STF, but Cena let Lesnar out of the hold when he refused to submit. In the end, Cena executed a fourth Attitude Adjustment on Lesnar. As Cena went for the cover, Seth Rollins emerged to attack Cena with the Money in the Bank briefcase, causing a disqualification. Rollins attacked Lesnar with a Curb Stomp and then attempted to cash in his contract but Cena attacked and drove him away before the match could actually begin. Lesnar then executed an F-5 on Cena to close the show, still WWE World Heavyweight Champion.

== Reception ==
Night of Champions received mostly positive reviews. The Sheamus vs. Cesaro match was highly acclaimed. James Caldwell of Pro Wrestling Torch gave the main event 3.75 out of 5 stars, calling it a "solid title match". However, he complained about the Intercontinental and Divas title changes. Dave Meltzer of the Wrestling Observer Newsletter referred to the US Title match and the Orton vs. Jericho match as "excellent matches". About the US Title match, he said it looked "like a G-1 match with a lot of stiff blows and reversals back-and-forth".

== Aftermath ==
Dean Ambrose opened the following episode of Raw to talk about The Authority consistently threatening him, including Seth Rollins Curb Stomping him through cinder blocks the previous month. Ambrose promised to face Rollins again as John Cena interrupted, revealing that they had similar goals. Cena also vowed revenge on Rollins as Triple H arrived with the rest of The Authority (Stephanie McMahon, Kane, Randy Orton, and Rollins). Triple H announced that Cena and Ambrose would both have matches later that night. Afterwards, Cena and Ambrose engaged in a brawl with The Authority before Rollins escaped backstage. Eventually, Rollins stole a car from a man and escaped with it. Later, Ambrose was scheduled to take on Kane and Cena was scheduled to take on Orton. Ambrose won via disqualification after being attacked by Rollins. Ambrose gained the upper hand on Rollins before being overpowered by him and Kane. Ambrose recovered and held a steel chair, forcing Rollins to retreat. In the show's main event, Cena defeated Orton via disqualification after interference from Rollins. Afterwards, Rollins, Kane, and Orton beat down Cena until Ambrose made the save. They subsequently gained the upper hand on Kane and Orton as Rollins escaped again. After more weeks of feuding, Hell in a Cell matches pitting Cena against Orton and Ambrose against Rollins were scheduled for Hell in a Cell. The former match was also to determine the number one contender for Brock Lesnar's WWE World Heavyweight Championship.

Also on Raw, The Miz defended his Intercontinental title against Dolph Ziggler in a Night of Champions rematch. Ziggler regained the title after rolling up The Miz with a handful of tights. During his weekly interview with Michael Cole, Triple H scheduled a battle royal for the September 26 episode of SmackDown, with the winner receiving a title match against Ziggler later in the night.

Also on Raw, Mark Henry addressed his loss to Rusev, but was interrupted by Rusev and Lana. A rematch between Rusev and Henry took place afterwards, with Rusev again victorious.

The Usos (Jey Uso and Jimmy Uso) teamed with Sheamus to take on and defeat Cesaro, and the WWE Tag Team Champions (Goldust and Stardust) on the following Raw. On that week's SmackDown, The Usos defeated Goldust and Stardust via disqualification after Goldust struck Jimmy with a title belt, thus Goldust and Stardust retained the title.

Nikki Bella gave a promo regarding why she lost at Night of Champions while mentioning skipping her sister Brie Bella's interview last night. Brie interrupted, and Nikki called her an embarrassment to the Bella name. After more insults, Brie slapped Nikki and attempted the "Yes! Lock", but Nikki escaped. Afterwards, Divas Champion AJ Lee defeated Nikki in a non-title match with Paige watching on. Paige was eventually scheduled to face Lee for the title at Hell in a Cell.

== Results ==
No.	Results	Stipulations	Times
1	Goldust and Stardust defeated The Usos (Jimmy and Jey) (c) by pinfall	Tag team match for the WWE Tag Team Championship	12:47
2	Sheamus (c) defeated Cesaro by pinfall	Singles match for the WWE United States Championship	13:06
3	The Miz (with Damien Mizdow) defeated Dolph Ziggler (c) (with R-Truth) by pinfall	Singles match for the WWE Intercontinental Championship	9:23
4	Seth Rollins defeated Roman Reigns by forfeit	Singles match	00:30
5	Rusev (with Lana) defeated Mark Henry by submission	Singles match	08:57
6	Randy Orton defeated Chris Jericho by pinfall	Singles match	16:20
7	AJ Lee defeated Paige (c) and Nikki Bella by submission	Triple threat match for the WWE Divas Championship	08:45
8	John Cena defeated Brock Lesnar (c) (with Paul Heyman) by disqualification	Singles match for the WWE World Heavyweight Championship	14:10
(c) / – the champion(s) heading into the match
