= WWE Night of Champions =

Pay-per-view and livestreaming event series

- WWE Night of Champions 2023 logo
- Promotion(s): World Championship Wrestling (2001); WWE (2007–present)
- Brands: Raw (2007–2010, 2023, 2025–present); SmackDown (2007–2010, 2023, 2025–present); ECW (2007–2009)
- Other name(s): WCW Monday Nitro: The Night of Champions (2001); Vengeance: Night of Champions (2007)
- First event: WCW Monday Nitro: The Night of Champions
- Event gimmick: Championship matches (2007–2015)

WWE Night of Champions is a professional wrestling pay-per-view (PPV) and livestreaming event produced by WWE, a Connecticut-based professional wrestling promotion. Established in 2007, the original concept was that every championship promoted on WWE's main roster was contested. Night of Champions was discontinued after the 2015 event, but was revived in 2023; however, while the event is still characterized by championship matches, it no longer features all of WWE's main roster championships, but since 2025, the finals of the King of the Ring and Queen of the Ring tournaments are held at Night of Champions.

The event originated in World Championship Wrestling (WCW), with the name The Night of Champions being used for the final episode of WCW Monday Nitro. After the then-World Wrestling Federation (WWF, renamed WWE in 2002) acquired the assets of WCW in 2001, including the rights to the event's name, WWE's first Night of Champions was held in June 2007 and was a crossover with Vengeance titled Vengeance: Night of Champions. In 2008, Vengeance was dropped in favor of Night of Champions and it took over the June PPV slot. The event then moved to July in 2009 before becoming the annual September PPV beginning in 2010. In 2016, Night of Champions was replaced by the similarly themed Clash of Champions which was discontinued after its final use in 2020. After eight years, Night of Champions was revived to be held in May 2023. An event was not held in 2024, but returned again in 2025. Since its revival in 2023, Night of Champions has been held as one of WWE's events in Saudi Arabia in support of Saudi Vision 2030.

To coincide with the original WWE brand extension (2002–2011), the events from 2007 to 2010 featured wrestlers from the Raw and SmackDown brands. The events from 2007 to 2009 also featured the ECW brand before that brand was dissolved in early 2010. During the first brand extension, these three brands were considered WWE's main roster. The brand extension ended in August 2011, but was reinstated in July 2016 with Raw and SmackDown again representing the main roster.

Under the event's original concept (2007–2015), 10 different WWE championships were contested at Night of Champions. Only four of these 10 championships were contested at every event during this time. These were the WWE Championship (called the WWE World Heavyweight Championship at the 2014 and 2015 events), the WWE Intercontinental Championship, the WWE United States Championship, and the WWE Tag Team Championship, the latter of which was renamed as Raw Tag Team Championship in 2016 to coincide with the second brand extension that began that year before it was renamed again as World Tag Team Championship in 2024. Although the events since 2023 have not retained this original concept, five newer championships have been contested, bringing the total number of different championships contested at Night of Champions to 15.

== History ==
As the Monday Night War concluded, World Championship Wrestling (WCW), the chief competitor to the World Wrestling Federation (WWF, renamed to WWE in 2002) had acquired the selected assets of WCW from then parent AOL Time Warner after all WCW programming was cancelled. WCW then announced that the final episode of Nitro on TNT would be held as Night of Champions, in which all WCW titles were on the line.

Six years later, on June 24, 2007, WWE held its annual Vengeance pay-per-view (PPV) under the title Vengeance: Night of Champions. As per its subtitle, all of WWE's championships at the time were contested at the event. The following June, Vengeance was dropped in favor of Night of Champions, which subsequently became an annual PPV and continued the championship theme. The event was then moved to July in 2009 before becoming the annual September PPV beginning in 2010. To coincide with the WWE brand extension, the events from 2007 to 2009 featured wrestlers from the Raw, SmackDown, and ECW brands. ECW was disbanded in early 2010, thus the 2010 event just featured Raw and SmackDown before the first brand split was dissolved in August 2011.

In April 2011, the "WWE" acronym became an orphaned initialism. In February 2014, WWE launched its livestreaming service, the WWE Network, with Night of Champions becoming available on the service in addition to traditional PPV. In 2016, after the reintroduction of the brand split between Raw and SmackDown, Night of Champions was replaced on the PPV schedule by the similarly themed Clash of Champions.

In March 2023, WWE announced that they would be reviving the King of the Ring event, but rebranded as "King and Queen of the Ring", which would also replace the Hell in a Cell event. However, on April 13, it was revealed that WWE decided to scrap that revival and would instead hold Night of Champions, thus reviving the Night of Champions event. According to Mike Johnson of PWInsider, this was a creative choice to revive and bring Night of Champions to an international market. It was also reported that the change was to please business partners in Saudi Arabia and add intrigue to the show with the crowning of a new world champion. The event was scheduled for Saturday, May 27, 2023, in Jeddah, Saudi Arabia as the ninth event WWE held in Saudi Arabia in support of Saudi Vision 2030 under a partnership that began in 2018. This was also the first Night of Champions to livestream on Peacock in the United States due to the American version of the WWE Network merging under Peacock in March 2021. This was subsequently the first Night of Champions to be held in Saudi Arabia, the first held on a Saturday, and the first held in May.

An event was not held in 2024, as WWE instead produced the King and Queen of the Ring event that was originally planned for the prior year, but Night of Champions was scheduled to return to Saudi Arabia in 2025, this time in Riyadh on Saturday, June 28, 2025, at the Kingdom Arena, which was the 13th event that WWE held in Saudi Arabia. This was also the first Night of Champions to livestream on Netflix in most international markets due to the WWE Network's merger under the service in those areas in January 2025. The 2025 event would also host the finals of the King and Queen of the Ring tournaments.

Plans for the 2026 event were initially subject to speculation due to the 2026 Iranian strikes on Saudi Arabia; notably, Formula One had called off the 2026 Saudi Arabian Grand Prix due to the strikes. However, on April 23, WWE officially confirmed that the event would proceed as planned on June 27 at the Kingdom Arena in Riyadh for a second consecutive year as the 15th event under the Saudi Arabian partnership. The event was again scheduled to host the finals of the King and Queen of the Ring tournaments. This also marked the first Night of Champions to livestream on ESPN Unlimited in the United States, as WWE's contract with Peacock to air main roster PPV and livestreaming events expired at the conclusion of Clash in Paris in August 2025.

== Concept ==
The original concept of Night of Champions was that every championship promoted on WWE's main roster was contested. This distinction of main roster championships came in 2012 after the establishment of NXT that year as the promotion's developmental territory, which introduced its own set of championships. In 2010, non-title matches began to be included on the card as fewer championships became available due to WWE unifying several titles that eventually led to the dissolution of the first brand extension in August 2011; after the final title unification in December 2013, WWE had just five titles on the main roster through the 2015 event.

With the revival of the event in 2023, this concept was not retained, as the WWE Championship, WWE Universal Championship, WWE United States Championship, and WWE Women's Tag Team Championship were not defended. WWE Champion Roman Reigns, who held the title together with the Universal Championship as the Undisputed WWE Universal Championship, competed at the event, but instead of defending his undisputed championship, he challenged for the Undisputed WWE Tag Team Championship, the umbrella term for the Raw Tag Team Championship (formerly WWE Tag Team) and SmackDown Tag Team Championship being held and defended together. The 2023 event instead was a celebration for the crowning of a new World Heavyweight Champion as well as marking the 1,000th day for Reigns as Universal Champion. The event also saw the Raw Women's Championship and SmackDown Women's Championship defended. These two titles, as well as the Universal, SmackDown Tag, and Women's Tag, were introduced during the second brand split that began in 2016. After the 2023 event, the Raw and SmackDown women's championships were renamed as the WWE Women's Championship and Women's World Championship, respectively. In 2024, the Universal Championship was retired with the WWE Championship subsequently referred to as the Undisputed WWE Championship. That same year, the Raw and SmackDown tag team championships were renamed as the World Tag Team Championship and WWE Tag Team Championship, respectively, and then in late 2024 and early 2025, the WWE Women's United States Championship and WWE Women's Intercontinental Championship were introduced.

The first table shows all championships that were contested at Night of Champions under its original concept from 2007 to 2015. In total, 10 different WWE championships were contested during these years.

The second table shows all championships contested since 2023. Although the events since 2023 have not retained the event's original concept, they have raised the total number of different championships defended at Night of Champions to 15. Additionally, since the 2025 event, Night of Champions has hosted the finals of the King and Queen of the Ring tournaments, which grant world championship matches to the respective winners at that year's SummerSlam.

All WWE championships that were contested at Night of Champions from 2007 to 2015.
Year	WWE	World Heavyweight (original)	ECW	Intercontinental	United States	World Tag Team (original)	WWE Tag Team (original)	Women's (original)	Divas	Cruiserweight (original)
2007	✓	✓	✓	✓	✓	✓	✓	✓	✗	✓
2008	✓	✓	✓	✓	✓	✓	✓	✓	✗	✗
2009	✓	✓	✓	✓	✓	✓	✓	✓	✓	✗
2010	✓	✓	✗	✓	✓	✗	✓	✓	✓	✗
2011	✓	✓	✗	✓	✓	✗	✓	✗	✓	✗
2012	✓	✓	✗	✓	✓	✗	✓	✗	✓	✗
2013	✓	✓	✗	✓	✓	✗	✓	✗	✓	✗
2014	✓	✗	✗	✓	✓	✗	✓	✗	✓	✗
2015	✓	✗	✗	✓	✓	✗	✓	✗	✓	✗

All WWE championships contested at Night of Champions since 2023.
Year	WWE	Universal	World Heavyweight	WWE Women's	Women's World	Intercontinental	United States	Women's Intercontinental	Women's United States	World Tag Team	WWE Tag Team	Women's Tag Team
2023	✗	✗	✓	✓	✓	✓	✗	✗	✗	✓	✓	✗
2025	✓	✗	✗	✗	✗	✗	✓	✗	✗	✗	✗	✗
2026	✓	✗	✗	✗	✗	✗	✓	✗	✓	✗	✗	✗

Notes

- The 2007 event, which was titled Vengeance: Night of Champions, was the only Night of Champions event to feature the original WWE Cruiserweight Championship under the WWE umbrella, as the title was deactivated in September that same year. A new Cruiserweight Championship was introduced in 2016 but was retired in 2022.
- The WWE Divas Championship was established shortly after the 2008 event. At the 2010 event, the original WWE Women's Championship was unified into the Divas Championship, thus retiring the Women's Championship in favor of continuing the lineage of the Divas Championship, which very briefly became known as the Unified WWE Divas Championship. The Divas Championship itself was then retired in 2016 and replaced by a new WWE Women's Championship, which was renamed Raw Women's Championship with the reintroduction of the brand split that year, which also saw the introduction of the SmackDown Women's Championship. The Raw and SmackDown women's championships were then renamed as the WWE Women's Championship and Women's World Championship, respectively, after the 2023 event.
- In 2009, the original World Tag Team Championship and original WWE Tag Team Championship were unified as the Unified WWE Tag Team Championship, but remained independently active until the World Tag Team Championship was decommissioned just before the 2010 event in favor of continuing the lineage of the WWE Tag Team Championship, which dropped the "unified" moniker. With the reintroduction of the brand split in 2016, the WWE Tag Team Championship was assigned to Raw and renamed Raw Tag Team Championship. The SmackDown Tag Team Championship was also introduced, and the two titles would become held together as the Undisputed WWE Tag Team Championship in 2022. They were split in 2024, with the Raw and SmackDown tag titles subsequently renamed as the World Tag Team Championship and WWE Tag Team Championship, respectively.
- In February 2010, the ECW brand was disbanded, deactivating the ECW Championship along with it.
- In December 2013, the original World Heavyweight Championship was unified into the WWE Championship, retiring the World Heavyweight Championship while the WWE Championship became known as the WWE World Heavyweight Championship. With the reintroduction of the brand split in 2016, the title reverted to being called the WWE Championship, and in 2023, a new World Heavyweight Championship was introduced.
- The WWE Universal Championship was introduced in 2016 and retired in 2024, but it was never defended at a Night of Champions event, as at the 2023 event, instead of defending the title, reigning champion Roman Reigns, who held the title together with the WWE Championship as the Undisputed WWE Universal Championship, instead challenged for the Undisputed WWE Tag Team Championship. After the Universal Championship was retired, the WWE Championship became known as the Undisputed WWE Championship.

== Events ==
#	Event	Date	City	Venue	Main event	Ref.
0	WCW Monday Nitro: The Night of Champions	March 26, 2001	Panama City Beach, Florida	Boardwalk Beach Resort	Sting vs. Ric Flair	
1	Vengeance: Night of Champions	June 24, 2007	Houston, Texas	Toyota Center	John Cena (c) vs. Mick Foley vs. Bobby Lashley vs. Randy Orton vs. King Booker in a Five-Pack Challenge for the WWE Championship	
2	Night of Champions (2008)	June 29, 2008	Dallas, Texas	American Airlines Center	Triple H (c) vs. John Cena for the WWE Championship	
3	Night of Champions (2009)	July 26, 2009	Philadelphia, Pennsylvania	Wachovia Center	CM Punk (c) vs. Jeff Hardy for the World Heavyweight Championship	
4	Night of Champions (2010)	September 19, 2010	Rosemont, Illinois	Allstate Arena	Sheamus (c) vs. Wade Barrett vs. Chris Jericho vs. Edge vs. Randy Orton vs. John Cena in a Six-Pack Elimination Match for the WWE Championship	
5	Night of Champions (2011)	September 18, 2011	Buffalo, New York	First Niagara Center	Triple H vs. CM Punk in a No Disqualification match	
6	Night of Champions (2012)	September 16, 2012	Boston, Massachusetts	TD Garden	CM Punk (c) vs. John Cena for the WWE Championship	
7	Night of Champions (2013)	September 15, 2013	Detroit, Michigan	Joe Louis Arena	Randy Orton (c) vs. Daniel Bryan for the WWE Championship	
8	Night of Champions (2014)	September 21, 2014	Nashville, Tennessee	Bridgestone Arena	Brock Lesnar (c) vs. John Cena for the WWE World Heavyweight Championship	
9	Night of Champions (2015)	September 20, 2015	Houston, Texas	Toyota Center	Seth Rollins (c) vs. Sting for the WWE World Heavyweight Championship	
10	Night of Champions (2023)	May 27, 2023	Jeddah, Saudi Arabia	Jeddah Super Dome	Kevin Owens and Sami Zayn (c) vs The Bloodline (Roman Reigns and Solo Sikoa) for the Undisputed WWE Tag Team Championship	
11	Night of Champions (2025)	June 28, 2025	Riyadh, Saudi Arabia	Kingdom Arena	John Cena (c) vs CM Punk for the Undisputed WWE Championship	
12	Night of Champions (2026)	June 27, 2026	Riyadh, Saudi Arabia	Kingdom Arena	Cody Rhodes (c) vs. Gunther vs. Sami Zayn in a triple threat match for the Undisputed WWE Championship	
(c) – refers to the champion(s) heading into the match

== See also ==
- List of current champions in WWE
- List of former championships in WWE
