= Night of Champions (2011) =

WWE pay-per-view event

- Promotional poster featuring Randy Orton holding the World Heavyweight Championship
- Promotion: WWE
- Date: September 18, 2011
- City: Buffalo, New York
- Venue: First Niagara Center
- Attendance: 11,000
- Buy rate: 161,000
- Tagline: It's a Night You Will Never Forget

Pay-per-view chronology
← Previous; SummerSlam	Next → Hell in a Cell

Night of Champions chronology
← Previous; 2010	Next → 2012

The 2011 Night of Champions was a professional wrestling pay-per-view (PPV) event produced by WWE. It was the fifth annual Night of Champions and took place on September 18, 2011, at the First Niagara Center in Buffalo, New York. The theme of the event was that all six of WWE's active championships at the time were defended.

Eight matches took place at the event, seven of which were broadcast live on pay-per-view. The event featured multiple main events, with Triple H defeating CM Punk in a No Disqualification match with a stipulation where had Triple H lost, he would have no longer been Chief Operating Officer of WWE, John Cena defeating Alberto Del Rio for the WWE Championship, and Mark Henry defeating Randy Orton for the World Heavyweight Championship.

The event garnered 161,000 buys, down from 165,000 buys the previous year. It was WWE's first PPV event to be held following the dissolution of the original brand extension the prior month. This was also the first Night of Champions held to be promoted under the company's shortened trade name of WWE, as following WrestleMania XXVII in April, the company ceased using its full name of World Wrestling Entertainment, although that remains the legal name of the company.

== Production ==
=== Background ===
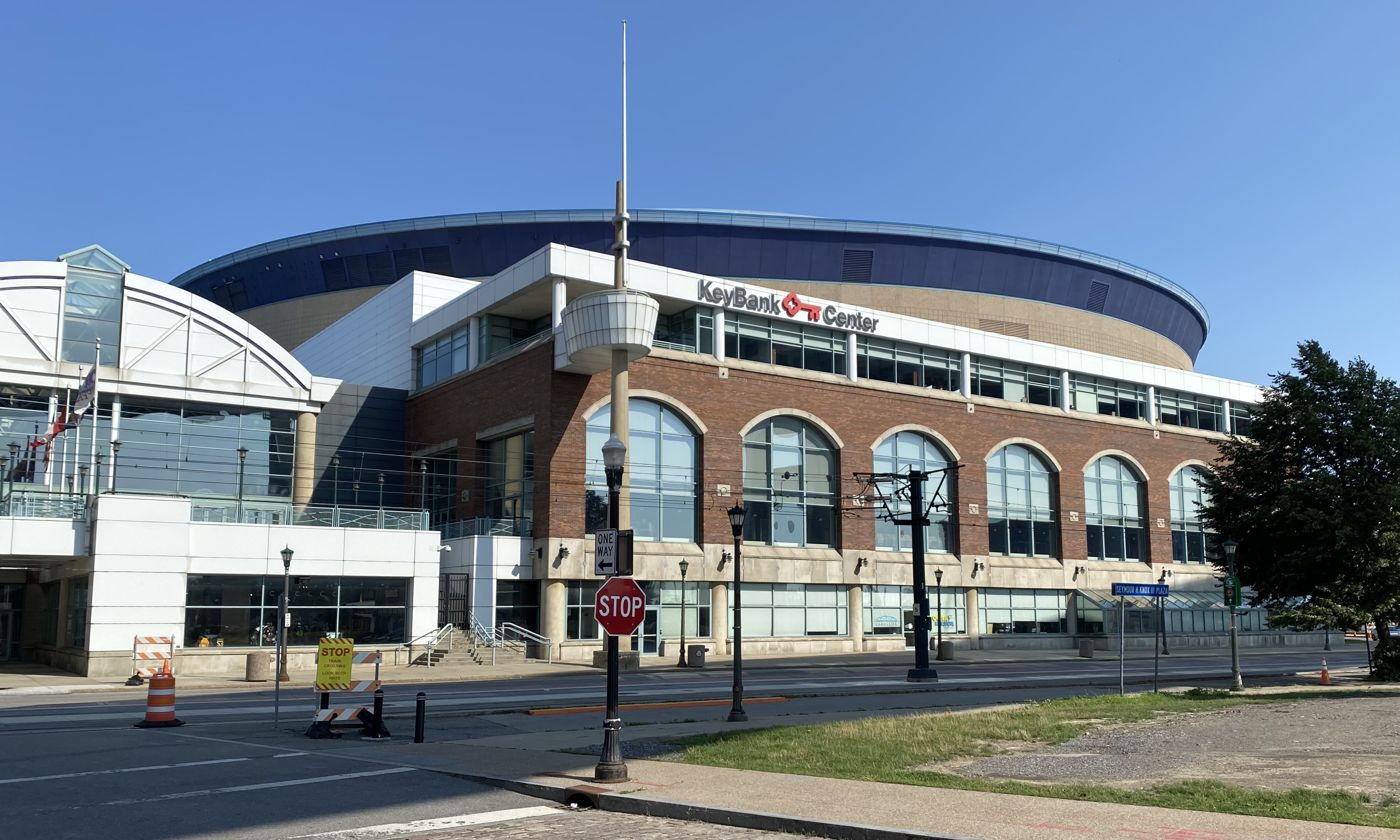
The fifth annual Night of Champions was held at the First Niagara Center in Buffalo, New York.

Night of Champions is a professional wrestling pay-per-view (PPV) event produced by WWE since 2007, with the event based around championship matches. The fifth event took place on September 18, 2011, at the First Niagara Center in Buffalo, New York. As per the theme of the event, every active championship promoted by WWE at the time was defended, which included the WWE Championship, the World Heavyweight Championship, the Intercontinental Championship, the United States Championship, the WWE Tag Team Championship, and the WWE Divas Championship.

This was WWE's first PPV event to be held following the end of the first brand extension in August. It was also the first Night of Champions held to be promoted under the company's shortened trade name of WWE, as following WrestleMania XXVII in April, the company ceased using its full name of World Wrestling Entertainment, although that remains the legal name of the company.

=== Storylines ===
Night of Champions featured professional wrestling matches involving different wrestlers from pre-existing scripted feuds, plots, and storylines that played out on WWE's television programs, Raw and SmackDown.

The main rivalry involved the former champion CM Punk and the Chief Operating Officer of WWE Triple H in a No Disqualification match. After Punk became the WWE Champion at SummerSlam, he was attacked by Kevin Nash. Nash had stated that Triple H had sent him a message telling him to take out the winner regardless of who it was, which gave Alberto Del Rio ample time to cash in his Money in the Bank contract and become WWE Champion. A vindictive CM Punk would take his aggression out on Nash, Triple H, and his wife Stephanie McMahon through constant verbal insults, especially to Triple H whom Punk believed to have instigated Nash's attack. On the August 29 episode of Raw SuperShow, Punk and Nash were scheduled to be in a match at Night of Champions, but at the end of the show, Triple H had the match changed to feature CM Punk against himself. The following week on Raw SuperShow, Triple H, after discovering that it was Nash that used his cell phone to make the text, fired him and changed the stipulation to be no disqualification. Punk in turn added his own stipulation that if Triple H lost to Punk, Triple H would have to resign as the COO of WWE.

Another rivalry involved the WWE Champion Alberto Del Rio defending his title against former champion John Cena. The previous month at SummerSlam, Cena had lost to CM Punk, who also had a claim to the WWE Championship. After the match, Money in the Bank winner Alberto Del Rio cashed in his contract after Punk was assaulted by Kevin Nash and won the WWE Championship. On the August 22 episode of Raw, Punk and Cena faced each other to determine Del Rio's opponent, with Cena winning and gaining the right to a rematch after some interference from Nash.

At SummerSlam, Randy Orton defeated Christian in a No Holds Barred match to win the World Heavyweight Championship. On the following episode of SmackDown, Mark Henry won a 20-man battle royal to become the number one contender for the title. After Orton defeated Christian in a Steel Cage match to retain the title on the August 30 episode, he was attacked by Henry. On the September 9 episode, Orton was scheduled to defend the title against Henry at Night of Champions.

== Event ==
Other on-screen personnel
Role:	Name:
English Commentators	Michael Cole
English Commentators	Jerry Lawler
English Commentators	Josh Matthews
English Commentators	Booker T
Spanish Commentators	Carlos Cabrera
Spanish Commentators	Marcelo Rodríguez
Ring announcers	Tony Chimel (SmackDown)
Ring announcers	Justin Roberts (Raw)
Referees	Mike Chioda
Referees	John Cone
Referees	Scott Armstrong
Referees	Chad Patton

=== Dark match ===
Before the event went live on pay-per-view, Daniel Bryan defeated Heath Slater in a dark match.

=== Preliminary matches ===
The actual pay-per-view opened with Air Boom (Evan Bourne and Kofi Kingston) defending the WWE Tag Team Championship against Awesome Truth (The Miz and R-Truth). At the end of the match, the referee was unaware that The Miz tagged in R-Truth. While the referee was arguing with R-Truth, The Miz executed a Skull Crushing Finale on Bourne for the pin, however, the referee and R-Truth were arguing and Bourne kicked out before the referee was able to count. A frustrated Miz shoved the referee down causing a disqualification, thus Air Boom retained the titles. R-Truth helped the referee up and then shoved him to the ground.

Next, Cody Rhodes defended the WWE Intercontinental Championship against Ted DiBiase. In the climax, DiBiase removed Rhodes' facial mask. As DiBiase tried to strike Rhodes with the mask, Rhodes pinned Dibiase with a roll up whilst holding his tights to retain the title.

Next up was an in-ring segment where Christian demanded one more match for the World Heavyweight Championship, only to be interrupted by Sheamus, who laid out Christian with a Brogue Kick.

After that, Dolph Ziggler (accompanied by Vickie Guerrero) defended the WWE United States Championship against Jack Swagger, Alex Riley and John Morrison in a fatal four-way match. In the end, as Swagger performed a Gutwrench Powerbomb on Morrison, Ziggler threw Swagger out of the ring and pinned Morrison to retain the title.

In the fourth match, Randy Orton defended the World Heavyweight Championship against Mark Henry. Throughout the match, Henry began to target Orton's knee. In the closing moments, Henry countered an RKO attempt and executed a World's Strongest Slam on Orton to win the title. Following the match, Henry was congratulated on finally winning the World Heavyweight Championship after 15 years.

In the fifth match, Kelly Kelly (with Eve Torres) defended the WWE Divas Championship against Beth Phoenix (accompanied by Natalya. Towards the end of the match, Phoenix superplexed Kelly. Kelly recovered and performed a roll-up on Phoenix to retain the title.

Next, John Cena faced Alberto Del Rio for the WWE Championship (accompanied by Ricardo Rodriguez). John Cena made an entrance in Del Rio's Ferrari F430 before the match. During the match, Del Rio applied the Cross Armbreaker only for Cena to counter Del Rio. As Rodriguez stood on the ring apron and tried to interfere, Cena knocked him off. In the climax, Cena executed an Attitude Adjustment and applied the STF on Del Rio, who submitted, to win the title.

=== Main event ===
In the main event, Triple H put his job as COO of WWE on the line against CM Punk in a No Disqualification match. Punk attacked Triple H during Triple H's entrance to start the match. The match spilled on the outside as the momentum kept shifting between the two competitors, and Triple H targeted Punk's legs. Back in the ring they kept trading shots and matched each other move for move. The action spilled outside again and both of them fought in the crowd and through the arena, with Punk throwing garbage cans at Triple H. Near the entrance ramp they both used the set display to attack one another, and Punk used aerial maneuvers and kicks to attack Hunter. Back in the ring CM Punk repeatedly used a steel chair to knock down Triple H and taunt him with his own crotch-chop. Triple H countered with a swift Spinebuster, and as they both fought outside Triple H went for the legs again using the ring post to inflict damage and nailing Punk with a chair himself and taunting him with a crotch-chop of his own. As Triple H went for a Figure-Four Leg Lock on the outside Punk kicked him into the steel steps. Punk then nailed the COO with a roundhouse kick and set him up on the announce table, following which he performed an elbow drop on Triple H from the top turnbuckle, driving him through the table. As they went back in the ring, The Miz and R-Truth came to the ring and attacked both competitors, nailing Triple H with a Skull Crushing Finale and CM Punk with a What's Up (Leaping Reverse STO). They placed Punk on Triple H but to their shock Triple H kicked out at two. They then started attacking the referee. Punk and Triple H then attacked The Miz and R-Truth as John Laurinaitis came down ringside trying to restore order. Triple H nailed Punk with a Pedigree, but as he covered him Laurinaitis diverted the attention of the referee towards the other referee knocked out by The Miz and R-Truth preventing him from making the pinfall. Punk recovered and knocked out Triple H with a G.T.S. (Go To Sleep). But as he covered him going for the pin, R-Truth once again attacked him breaking up the fall at two. Punk had had enough and knocked R-Truth out with a crushing Go To Sleep outside the ring. He then attempted an aerial attack on Triple H, jumping from the top rope, but Triple H countered with a kick to the abdomen, and nailed a devastating second Pedigree. Triple H covered him but to everyone's shock the resilient Punk still kicked out at two. Laurinaitis was seen texting someone from ringside, and as Punk and Triple H continued to fight, Kevin Nash came to the ring from the crowd and attacked them both. He then tried to nail Triple H with a Jackknife Powerbomb but Punk prevented the attack on his competitor. In retaliation, Nash attacked Punk and laid him out with a thunderous Jackknife Powerbomb. He then turned his attention to Triple H, but before he could do any damage, Triple H hit Nash with a sledgehammer outside the ring. He then reentered the ring and executed a devastating third Pedigree and pinned Punk to win the match and retain his job as COO.

== Reception ==
Night of Champions 2011 received mixed to positive reviews by the critics, with Dave Meltzer saying that WWE had put on two awesome pay-per-views (Money in the Bank and SummerSlam) and Night of Champions could not follow them, but that it was an entertaining event nonetheless.

== Aftermath ==
The following night on Raw, Triple H announced the first ever Triple Threat Hell in a Cell match for the WWE Championship at Hell in a Cell with John Cena defending the title against Alberto Del Rio, who was granted his rematch clause after losing the title at Night of Champions and CM Punk, who never got his rematch. Del Rio won the match after pinning Punk after hitting him with a lead pipe and locking Cena out of the cell. The Miz and R-Truth attacked the three after the match. A few weeks later, Triple H fired Miz and Truth. John Laurinaitis rehired Miz and Truth and Miz and Truth defeated the team of Triple H and CM Punk at Vengeance after interference by Kevin Nash.

Mark Henry attacked Jim Ross and Jerry Lawler the next night because of Ross and Lawler never believing that he could become World champion. SmackDown General Manager Theodore Long announced later that night that Henry would defend the title against Orton in a Hell in a Cell match, where Henry subsequently retained.

After Sheamus Brogue Kicked Christian at the pay-per-view, they fought at Hell in a Cell and Vengeance with Sheamus winning both matches.

Beth Phoenix was able to defeat Kelly Kelly at Hell in a Cell to become the Divas champion.

== Results ==
No.	Results	Stipulations	Times
1^{D}	Daniel Bryan defeated Heath Slater by pinfall	Singles match	5:13
2	Air Boom (Evan Bourne and Kofi Kingston) (c) defeated Awesome Truth (The Miz and R-Truth) by disqualification	Tag team match for the WWE Tag Team Championship	9:51
3	Cody Rhodes (c) defeated Ted DiBiase by pinfall	Singles match for the WWE Intercontinental Championship	9:44
4	Dolph Ziggler (c) (with Vickie Guerrero) defeated Jack Swagger, Alex Riley, and John Morrison by pinfall	Fatal 4-Way match for the WWE United States Championship	8:21
5	Mark Henry defeated Randy Orton (c) by pinfall	Singles match for the World Heavyweight Championship	13:07
6	Kelly Kelly (c) (with Eve Torres) defeated Beth Phoenix (with Natalya) by pinfall	Singles match for the WWE Divas Championship	6:30
7	John Cena defeated Alberto Del Rio (c) (with Ricardo Rodriguez) by submission	Singles match for the WWE Championship	17:32
8	Triple H defeated CM Punk by pinfall	No Disqualification match (Note: Had Triple H lost, he would have resigned as COO.)	24:09
(c) / – the champion(s) heading into the match; D / – this was a dark match
