= SummerSlam (2011) =

WWE pay-per-view event

- Promotional poster featuring various WWE wrestlers.
- Promotion: WWE
- Brand(s): Raw; SmackDown
- Date: August 14, 2011
- City: Los Angeles, California
- Venue: Staples Center
- Attendance: 17,404
- Buy rate: 296,000
- Tagline: "The Biggest Party of the Summer"

Pay-per-view chronology
| ← Previous; Money in the Bank | Next → Night of Champions |

SummerSlam chronology
| ← Previous; 2010 | Next → 2012 |

The 2011 SummerSlam was a professional wrestling pay-per-view (PPV) event produced by WWE. It was the 24th annual SummerSlam and took place on August 14, 2011, at the Staples Center in Los Angeles, California, held for wrestlers from the promotion's Raw and SmackDown brand divisions. This was the third of six consecutive SummerSlam events to take place at the arena.

The card consisted of eight matches, but only seven were televised. In the main event, CM Punk defeated John Cena to become Raw's undisputed WWE Champion with Triple H as the special guest referee, after which, Alberto Del Rio cashed in his Money in the Bank briefcase and defeated Punk to win the championship. In another prominent match, Randy Orton defeated Christian in a No Holds Barred match to regain SmackDown's World Heavyweight Championship.

SummerSlam attracted a sellout crowd of 17,404 fans at the Staples Center, grossing more than US$1 million, marking the highest-grossing SummerSlam held at the venue. The event garnered 296,000 pay-per-view buys, down from 350,000 buys the previous year. This was the first SummerSlam event held to be promoted under the company's shortened trade name of WWE, as following WrestleMania XXVII in April, the company ceased using its full name of World Wrestling Entertainment, although that remains the legal name of the company. It was also WWE's final PPV event held before the dissolution of the original brand extension, which was introduced in March 2002, although the brand split would be reintroduced in July 2016.

== Production ==
=== Background ===
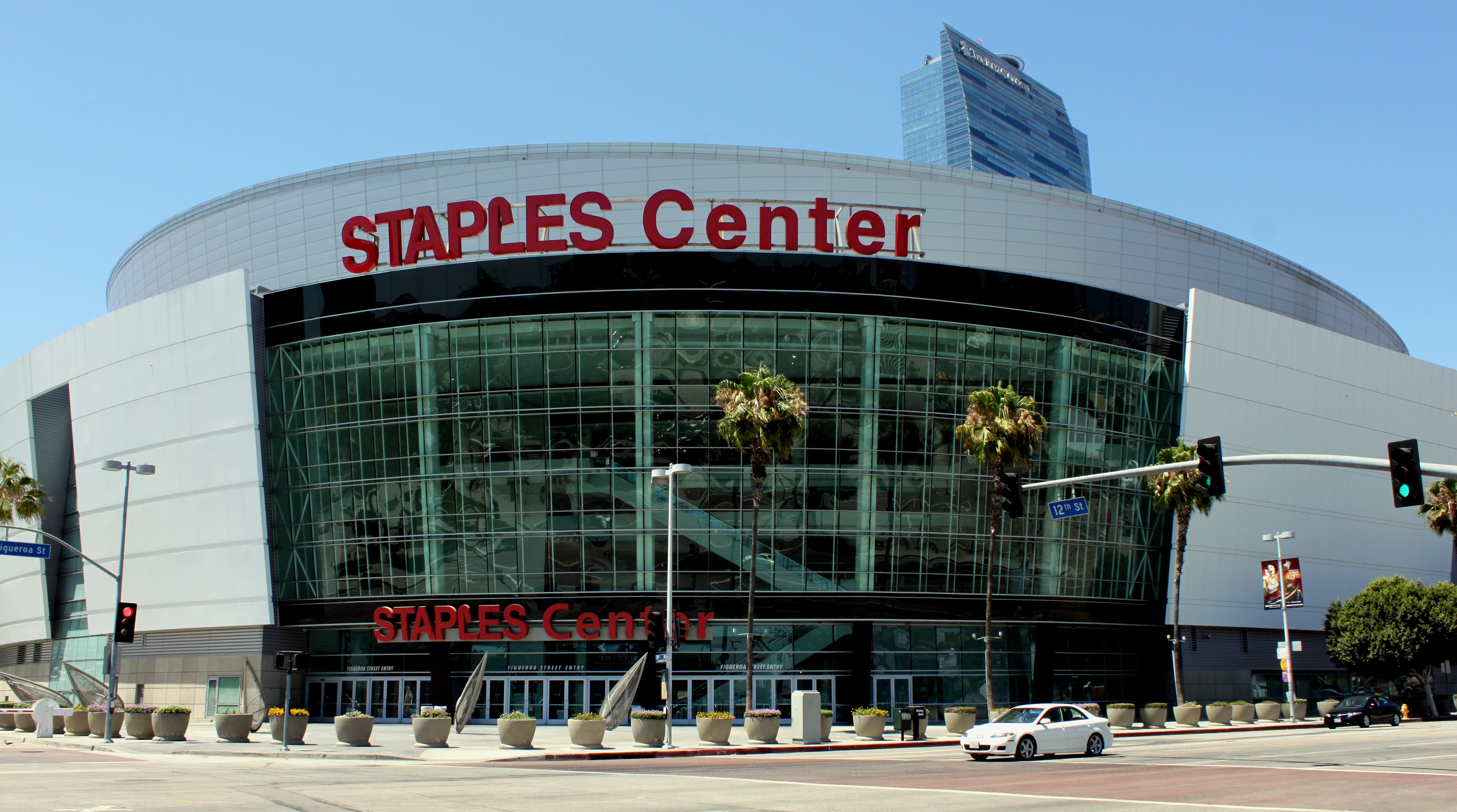
The 24th annual SummerSlam was the third of six consecutive years for the event to be held at the Staples Center in Los Angeles, California.

SummerSlam is an annual professional wrestling pay-per-view (PPV) event produced every August by WWE since 1988. Dubbed "The Biggest Party of the Summer", it is one of the promotion's original four pay-per-views, along with WrestleMania, Royal Rumble, and Survivor Series, referred to as the "Big Four". It has since become considered WWE's second biggest event of the year behind WrestleMania. The 24th SummerSlam was scheduled to be held on August 14, 2011, at the Staples Center in Los Angeles, California for the third consecutive year. It featured wrestlers from the Raw and SmackDown brand divisions.

Much like the previous year's SummerSlam, WWE promoted the event with its SummerSlam Axxess fan convention, held at the Nokia Plaza in LA Live on August 13 and 14. R&B singer Cee Lo Green performed both "'Bright Lights Bigger City", the official theme song for the event, and his hit "Forget You" during the broadcast. The commentators for this event were Michael Cole, Jerry Lawler, and Booker T.

This was the first SummerSlam held to be promoted under the company's shortened trade name of WWE, as following WrestleMania XXVII in April, the company ceased using its full name of World Wrestling Entertainment, although that remains the legal name of the company.

=== Storylines ===
The professional wrestling matches at SummerSlam featured professional wrestlers performing as characters in scripted events pre-determined by the hosting promotion, WWE. Storylines between the characters were produced on WWE's weekly television shows Raw and SmackDown with the Raw and SmackDown brands—storyline divisions in which WWE assigned its employees to different programs.

The main feud headed into SummerSlam from the SmackDown brand was between Christian and Randy Orton, over Christian's World Heavyweight Championship. At Extreme Rules in May, Christian defeated Alberto Del Rio in a ladder match to win the vacant World Heavyweight Championship for the first time, only to lose it to Orton on the May 6 episode of SmackDown. After two unsuccessful attempts at regaining the title from Orton at the Over the Limit and Capitol Punishment pay-per-views, Christian finally won the championship for the second time at the Money in the Bank event in July, after he spat in Orton's face, provoking the latter to kick Christian in the groin and get himself disqualified; as per pre-match stipulations enacted by Christian, he won the title. On the July 29 episode of SmackDown, the new Chief Operating Officer of WWE, Triple H, scheduled a title defense by Christian against Orton in a No Holds Barred match at SummerSlam.

The main event from the Raw brand for SummerSlam would pit John Cena against CM Punk for the WWE Championship. In the weeks leading to the Money in the Bank pay-per-view in July on Raw, Punk announced the expiration of his WWE contract on the night of the Money in the Bank, en route lambasting WWE for failing to promote him as the "best wrestler in the world", and threatened some high authority figures like WWE Chairman, Vince McMahon, of defeating Cena and leaving WWE with the championship. At Money in the Bank, Punk pinned Cena to win the title, and even after McMahon tried to have Alberto Del Rio – who had won the Raw Money in the Bank briefcase earlier that night – cash in his contract against Punk. The latter nevertheless left the arena with the championship. The following night on Raw, McMahon dismissed Punk's claim to the title, and announced an 8-man tournament to decide the new WWE Champion. Also, on the same night, Triple H relieved McMahon of his duties, and assumed control over WWE as the Chief Operating Officer just as the chairman was about to fire Cena. On the July 25 episode of Raw, Rey Mysterio defeated The Miz in the finals to become the WWE Champion but lost it later on the same night against Cena. After the match, Punk returned to WWE with the title belt he had won at Money in the Bank, initiating a title dispute between Cena and Punk. As they were now two wrestlers with a claim to the WWE Championship, a one-on-one match between Punk and Cena was scheduled for SummerSlam to determine the undisputed WWE Champion. On the August 8 episode of Raw, Triple H made himself the special guest referee for the Undisputed WWE Championship match.

The Divas rivalry heading into SummerSlam was between Kelly Kelly and Beth Phoenix over the WWE Divas Championship. On the August 1 episode of Raw, Phoenix won a Divas battle royal to become the #1 Contender for the Kelly's Divas Championship at SummerSlam. Phoenix turned heel after her victory by attacking Kelly in and out of the ring, and later told Kelly that "her days as the cute, blonde little bimbo are over". On the following week, Phoenix defeated Eve Torres in singles action, but was attacked by Kelly after the match.

== Event ==
Other on-screen personnel
| Role: | Name: |
|---|---|
| English Commentators | Michael Cole |
| English Commentators | Jerry Lawler |
| English Commentators | Booker T |
| Spanish Commentators | Carlos Cabrera |
| Spanish Commentators | Marcelo Rodríguez |
| Ring announcers | Tony Chimel (SmackDown) |
| Ring announcers | Justin Roberts (Raw) |
| Referees | Mike Chioda |
| Referees | Justin King |
| Referees | Jack Doan |
| Referees | Scott Armstrong |
| Referees | Chad Patton |
| Referees | Charles Robinson |
| Referees | Triple H (Punk vs. Cena) |

=== Preliminary matches ===
The first match was a six-man tag team match pitting Kofi Kingston, John Morrison, and Rey Mysterio against The Miz, R-Truth, and Alberto Del Rio. Mysterio performed a 619 followed by a slingshot Splash on R-Truth to win the match.

Next, Sheamus faced off against Mark Henry. Sheamus executed a Brogue Kick on Henry but Henry rolled out of the ring. Henry tackled Sheamus through the barricade. Sheamus was counted out, giving Henry the win.

In the next match, Kelly Kelly defended the WWE Divas Championship against Beth Phoenix. Phoenix attempted a Glam Slam on Kelly but Kelly countered the move into a Roll Up to retain the title.

Next, Wade Barrett faced Daniel Bryan. Barrett executed Wasteland to win the match.

=== Main event matches ===
In the SmackDown main event, Christian defended the World Heavyweight Championship against Randy Orton in a No Holds Barred match. Before the match, Christian revealed that Edge would be in his corner for the match, but Edge told Christian that he was disappointed with him and walked away. During the match, Christian attempted an RKO through a broadcast table on Orton but Orton countered the move into an RKO through the broadcast table on Christian. Christian executed a KillSwitch on Orton for a near-fall. Orton performed a Powerslam through a table on Christian and an Elevated DDT onto a Trash Can. Christian attempted a Sunset Flip out of the corner but Orton countered the move into an RKO on the steel steps to win the title.

In the Raw main event, John Cena wrestled CM Punk to determine the undisputed WWE Champion. Triple H served as guest referee. Cena executed the Attitude Adjustment for a near-fall. Punk performed a GTS on Cena for a near-fall. Punk executed a GTS to win the title, despite Cena's foot being on the bottom rope.

As Punk celebrated his WWE Championship win, Kevin Nash returned and attacked Punk with a Jackknife Powerbomb. Immediately afterwards, Alberto Del Rio appeared and cashed in his Money in the Bank contract. Del Rio performed a Step Up Enziguiri on Punk to win the title.

== Reception ==
Dave Meltzer gave the WWE Championship match 3.5 stars and the World Heavyweight Championship match 4 stars (the highest of the event). The six-man tag team match received 3.75 stars, the Mark Henry vs. Sheamus match received 1.5 stars, the Divas Championship match received 2 stars, and the Wade Barrett vs. Daniel Bryan match received 3.25 stars.

== Aftermath ==
=== Raw ===
Triple H opened the following episode of Raw to address the WWE Championship match against John Cena and CM Punk, as well as Alberto Del Rio's Money in the Bank cash-in. Del Rio interrupted, wanting to represent the roster with respect, honesty, and passion. Del Rio was then scheduled to defend the title against former champion Rey Mysterio, where he retained. Afterwards, Cena mentioned that Punk earned the right to become champion and Del Rio got lucky. The following week, Cena defeated Punk in a rematch after interference from Nash to become the number one contender for the title at Night of Champions. On the August 29 episode, Punk and Nash were scheduled for a match at the event, but at the end of the show, Triple H changed the match to feature CM Punk against himself.

=== SmackDown ===
New World Heavyweight Champion Randy Orton opened the following episode of SmackDown, and was informed by SmackDown General Manager Theodore Long that he would defend the title against the winner of a 20-man battle royal, which was won by Mark Henry. The following week, Christian blamed Edge for his loss at SummerSlam, and was scheduled to face Orton for the title on the August 30 episode, stipulated as a Steel Cage match, where Orton retained, but was attacked by Henry after the match. Henry's title match was then confirmed for Night of Champions.

=== Future ===
In March 2002, WWE initiated the brand extension, which promoted its core business of professional wrestling through such brands, named after their two major television shows, Raw and SmackDown. On the August 29 episode of Raw, it was announced that performers from Raw and SmackDown were no longer exclusive to their respective brand. Subsequently, championships previously exclusive to one show or the other were available for wrestlers from any show to compete for; this would mark the end of the brand extension, as all programming and live events featured the full WWE roster. In turn, SummerSlam 2011 was the last pay-per-view event to occur under the first brand split. In 2013, Stephanie McMahon revealed in an interview with Advertising Age that WWE's decision to end the brand extension was due to wanting their content to flow across television and online platforms. However, the brand split was reintroduced in July 2016, when SmackDown began broadcasting live on Tuesdays.

== Results ==
| No. | Results | Stipulations | Times |
|---|---|---|---|
| 1^{D} | Dolph Ziggler (with Vickie Guerrero) defeated Alex Riley by pinfall | Singles match | — |
| 2 | Kofi Kingston, John Morrison, and Rey Mysterio defeated The Miz, R-Truth, and Alberto Del Rio (with Ricardo Rodriguez) by pinfall | Six-man tag team match | 9:40 |
| 3 | Mark Henry defeated Sheamus by countout | Singles match | 9:22 |
| 4 | Kelly Kelly (c) (with Eve Torres) defeated Beth Phoenix (with Natalya) by pinfall | Singles match for the WWE Divas Championship | 6:48 |
| 5 | Wade Barrett defeated Daniel Bryan by pinfall | Singles match | 11:48 |
| 6 | Randy Orton defeated Christian (c) by pinfall | No Holds Barred match for the World Heavyweight Championship | 23:43 |
| 7 | CM Punk (c) defeated John Cena (c) by pinfall | Singles match for the undisputed WWE Championship; Triple H served as the special guest referee. | 24:08 |
| 8 | Alberto Del Rio defeated CM Punk (c) by pinfall | Singles match for the WWE Championship; This was Del Rio's Money in the Bank cash-in match. | 0:11 |
(c) / – the champion(s) heading into the match; D / – this was a dark match
