= SummerSlam (2012) =

WWE pay-per-view event

- Promotional poster featuring Brock Lesnar
- Promotion: WWE
- Date: August 19, 2012
- City: Los Angeles, California
- Venue: Staples Center
- Attendance: 17,482
- Buy rate: 358,000
- Tagline: The Perfect Storm

Pay-per-view chronology
← Previous; Money in the Bank	Next → Night of Champions

SummerSlam chronology
← Previous; 2011	Next → 2013

The 2012 SummerSlam was a professional wrestling pay-per-view (PPV) event produced by WWE. It was the 25th annual SummerSlam and took place on August 19, 2012, at the Staples Center in Los Angeles, California. This was the fourth of six consecutive SummerSlam events to take place at the arena. It was also the first SummerSlam held since the end of the first brand extension, which happened shortly after the 2011 event.

Eight matches were contested at the event, including one on the pre-show. In the main event, Brock Lesnar defeated Triple H by submission. In other marquee matches, The Miz retained the WWE Intercontinental Championship against Rey Mysterio, Daniel Bryan defeated Kane, and CM Punk retained the WWE Championship against Big Show and John Cena in a triple threat match.

== Production ==
=== Background ===
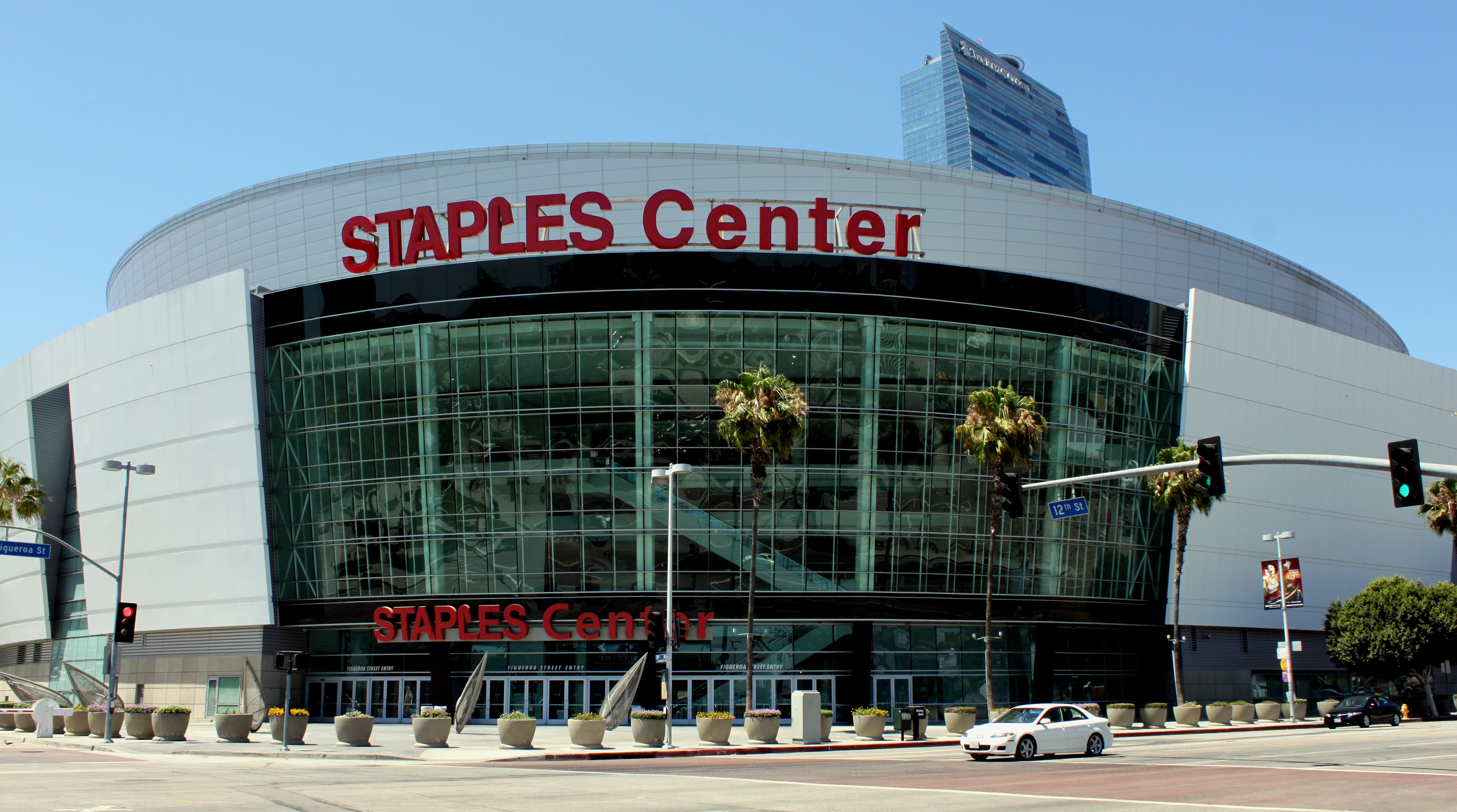
The 25th annual SummerSlam was the fourth of six consecutive years for the event to be held at the Staples Center in Los Angeles, California.

SummerSlam is an annual professional wrestling pay-per-view (PPV) event produced every August by WWE since 1988. Dubbed "The Biggest Party of the Summer", it is one of the promotion's original four pay-per-views, along with WrestleMania, Royal Rumble, and Survivor Series, referred to as the "Big Four". It has since become considered WWE's second biggest event of the year behind WrestleMania. The 25th SummerSlam was scheduled to be held on August 19, 2012, at Staples Center in Los Angeles, California for the fourth consecutive year. It was the first SummerSlam held since the end of the first brand split in August 2011, which happened right after the previous year's event.

=== Storylines ===
The event comprised eight matches, including one on the pre-show, that resulted from scripted storylines. Results were predetermined by WWE's writers, while storylines were produced on WWE's weekly television shows, Raw and SmackDown.

The most highly promoted match, billed as "The Perfect Storm", on the card saw Triple H facing off against Brock Lesnar. On the April 30 episode of Raw, Lesnar attempted to renegotiate his contract with General Manager John Laurinaitis. Triple H (in his corporate role as Chief Operations Officer) intervened, and declared that the contract Lesnar had agreed to upon re-signing with WWE was still valid and thus Lesnar could not add any other clauses to it. This led to a brawl between Lesnar and Triple H resulting in the latter having his arm broken by Lesnar via the Kimura armbar. Triple H returned at No Way Out, not only addressing Lesnar and the lawsuits brought against WWE, but also challenging him to a match at SummerSlam, in exchange for his dropping the lawsuits that his legal representative, Paul Heyman, made against WWE and Triple H. On the June 18 episode of Raw, Heyman made an appearance, rejecting Triple H's challenge on behalf of Lesnar. After further goading from Heyman, Triple H attacked him. Meanwhile, it was announced that Lesnar would respond to Triple H's challenge on the July 2 episode of Raw; however, at the event it was announced that he would instead return at Raw 1000 on July 23. On that night, Heyman again declined the challenge, but after Triple H's wife Stephanie McMahon slapped him (due to making remarks about their children), Heyman accepted on behalf of Lesnar. Then, on the August 6 episode of Raw, Shawn Michaels made an appearance to announce that he would be in Triple H's corner at SummerSlam. However, Michaels would not make it to SummerSlam after Lesnar used a kimura lock to break his arm on the August 13 episode.

In another match, CM Punk defended the WWE Championship against John Cena and Big Show in a triple threat match. In recent weeks, Punk claimed that even though he was WWE Champion, he often felt as if he was pushed to the background in favor of stars like Cena and The Rock. At Raw 1000, The Rock declared he would be getting a WWE Championship shot at the 2013 Royal Rumble PPV. That same night, Cena cashed in his Money in the Bank contract to challenge Punk for the title. After Big Show's interference led to a disqualification, The Rock rushed the ring to help fend off Big Show. Punk would then attack Rock, hitting him with a GTS and turning heel for the first time since 2011. The following week, Cena and Big Show would fight in a number one contender's match for a shot at the WWE Championship at SummerSlam. After Punk's interference led to a no contest, new Raw General Manager AJ Lee announced that Punk would defend the title against both Cena and Big Show in a triple threat match at SummerSlam.

Daniel Bryan had proposed marriage to AJ on July 16 episode of Raw, which she accepted and agreed to have the wedding as part of Raw 1000. However, during the ceremony, AJ rejected Bryan, and it was announced that she was named as the new GM of Raw by Vince McMahon, which led Bryan to get angry and destroy the wedding decorations in the ring. He was later confronted and insulted by CM Punk, The Rock, and even guest star Charlie Sheen. After a loss to Sheamus in a street fight on July 30 episode of Raw, Bryan underwent a psychological exam (under orders from AJ as retaliation for finding out that Bryan planned on having her committed to a mental institution after they were legally married) and was attacked by Kane (who claimed he was Bryan's "anger management therapist"). On the August 6 episode of Raw, AJ booked Bryan to wrestle Kane at SummerSlam.

Another match on the card was between Dolph Ziggler and Chris Jericho. At Money in the Bank Ziggler won the Money in the Bank ladder match for the World Heavyweight Championship contract, while Jericho failed to win his Money in the Bank ladder match for the WWE Championship match contract. The next night on Raw, Jericho interrupted Ziggler's victory speech. Ziggler then put Jericho's recent performances under question, claiming that Jericho "can't win the big ones anymore" and "lost his touch". Jericho responded by nailing Ziggler with a Codebreaker. On Raw 1000 during a six-man tag team match, Ziggler hit his tag-team partner Jericho, causing him to lose the match. On the July 27 episode of SmackDown, Jericho (wearing Ziggler's gear) threw Ziggler in the ring to be Brogue Kicked by Sheamus. On the August 6 episode of Raw Ziggler faced Alex Riley, but lost due to being distracted by Jericho. It was announced on the August 10 episode of SmackDown that Ziggler would face Jericho at SummerSlam.

In 2011, The Miz and Rey Mysterio feuded after Mysterio defeated Miz in a tournament finals to crown a new WWE Champion. During a house show, Mysterio faced Miz again, but during the match, Mysterio was injured, forcing him to undergo surgery and remain inactive, which was blamed on storyline to an attack by Alberto Del Rio. Ten months later, on the July 16 episode of "Raw", Mysterio made his return attacking Del Rio with a 619. Meanwhile, on Raw 1000, The Miz defeated Christian to win his first Intercontinental Championship. After his return, Mysterio declared his intention to become Intercontinental Champion. During the August 10 episode of SmackDown, Mysterio defeated The Miz in a non-title match. Therefore, Mysterio received a title match against Miz at SummerSlam.

At Money in the Bank, after The Prime Time Players (Darren Young and Titus O'Neil) were defeated by Primo & Epico, The Prime Time Players confronted WWE Tag Team Champions Kofi Kingston and R-Truth and tried to attack them, to which R-Truth threw a bottle of water at the Prime Time Players' manager Abraham Washington, starting a feud between the two teams. On the July 16 episode of Raw, Kingston and Truth successfully defended the WWE Tag Team Championship against the Prime Time Players. On the August 10 episode of SmackDown, The Prime Time Players defeated Primo & Epico by disqualification after Kingston and Truth, who were at the commentators table, attacked Washington, earning a WWE Tag Team Championship match against reigning champions Kingston and Truth at the pay-per-view.

Since April, World Heavyweight Champion Sheamus entered a feud with Alberto Del Rio around the championship after Del Rio defeated Sheamus by disqualification on the April 6 episode of SmackDown, after Del Rio faked being hit with a steel chair, winning a championship opportunity in the future. That opportunity was not granted until Over the Limit, where Sheamus retained against Del Rio, Chris Jericho and Randy Orton. During the following weeks, the two continued their feud, which directed to a match at No Way Out, in which Dolph Ziggler replaced Del Rio (due to Del Rio suffering an injury on the June 6 episode of SmackDown), where Sheamus again retained. When Del Rio returned, they immediately resumed their feud, facing again at Money in the Bank, where Sheamus again defeated Del Rio. However, Del Rio demanded one more match, which he got after defeating Kane, Rey Mysterio and Daniel Bryan on the July 27 episode of SmackDown, setting up a match between Del Rio and Sheamus at SummerSlam. On the August 10 episode of SmackDown, Del Rio attacked Sheamus with the help of fake policemen that Del Rio himself hired, in revenge for Sheamus stealing his car earlier that week on the August 6 episode of Raw, leading to Booker T, the newly appointed General Manager of SmackDown, to cancel the match between Del Rio and Sheamus for the title, angering Del Rio. However, the following week on SmackDown, after Del Rio defeated Chris Jericho, Sheamus asked for the match to be reinstated, which was accepted by Booker T.

On the August 13 episode of Raw, it was announced that Jersey Shore personality Pauly D would be the social media ambassador for the event.

WWE legend Mick Foley was scheduled to face the debuting Dean Ambrose at the event. Ambrose had accused Foley for being the cause of a lost generation at WrestleMania Axxess and would to continue to insult him on Twitter. However, Foley was not cleared to compete by his doctors, he announced his final retirement, and the match was scrapped. Ambrose would make his debut later in the year as part of the stable The Shield.

== Event ==
Other on-screen personnel
Role:	Name:
English commentators	Michael Cole
English commentators	Jerry Lawler
Spanish commentators	Carlos Cabrera
Spanish commentators	Marcelo Rodriguez
Backstage interviewer	Matt Striker
Ring announcers	Justin Roberts
Ring announcers	Lilian Garcia
Ring announcers	Tony Chimel
Referees	John Cone
Referees	Charles Robinson
Referees	Jack Doan
Referees	Mike Chioda
Referees	Chad Patton

Prior to the pay-per-view, Antonio Cesaro, who had been accompanied by Aksana, defeated Santino Marella to win the United States Championship after a Neutralizer.

=== Preliminary matches ===
The first match that aired from the show pitted Chris Jericho against Dolph Ziggler. Jericho's rib injury came into play when it cost him too much time to cover Ziggler after performing a frankensteiner on Ziggler. Ziggler was very close to victory after raising his knees when Jericho tried for the Lionsault and then executed the Zig Zag for a near-fall. Jericho executed a Codebreaker, but the momentum from the move knocked him out of the ring. Jericho made Ziggler submit to the Walls of Jericho to win the match.

The second match in the pay-per-view was between Daniel Bryan and Kane. Kane went crazy after Bryan slapped him in the face. Kane's anger opened things up for Bryan, but he was unable to apply the No Lock. Bryan attempted a diving headbutt, but Kane grabbed him by the throat when he landed and then performed the chokeslam. Kane was still angry about the slap and decided to give him the Tombstone Piledriver instead of going for the win. Bryan was able to reverse the move into a small package on Kane to win before immediately fleeing to the back. Following the match, Kane was shown tearing apart the backstage area while searching for Bryan.

Next was the Intercontinental Championship match between the champion The Miz and challenger Rey Mysterio. During the match, Mysterio was able to execute the 619 but missed when he tried Droppin' Da Dime on The Miz. A few moments later, The Miz executed the Skull Crushing Finale to get the win.

=== Main event matches ===
The World Heavyweight Championship was on the line next with Sheamus defending his title against Alberto Del Rio. Rodriguez threw a shoe to Del Rio, but Sheamus caught it instead and hit Del Rio with it. He then executed an Irish Curse on Del Rio and pinned him to retain the championship, but Del Rio had his foot on the ropes, which should have resulted in a rope break, but referee Mike Chioda didn't see that and thus allowed Sheamus to retain his title.

The next match was for the WWE Tag Team Championship between R-Truth and Kofi Kingston and the number one contenders The Prime Time Players (Darren Young and Titus O'Neil). Kingston got rid of O'Neil with a flying body press outside of the ring. Inside of the ring, R-Truth performed the Lie Detector on Young to get the win.

A triple threat match was up next, which saw CM Punk defending his WWE Championship against John Cena and Big Show. Big Show dominated the match, but Cena and Punk were able to eventually wear him down. Punk trapped Big Show's head in a Koji clutch while Cena put Big Show in the STF, which caused Big Show to submit. Because of the confusion over who won the match, AJ Lee came to the ring and restarted the match. Cena was able to execute the Attitude Adjustment on Big Show. Punk however, then tossed Cena out of the ring and pinned Big Show to get the win and keep the title.

In the final match, Brock Lesnar (accompanied by Paul Heyman) faced Triple H. Lesnar was focused on the arm of Triple H which he broke a few months ago. He slammed Triple H on his arm on top of the announcers table. The referee refused to start the count when Triple H was outside of the ring. Lesnar controlled the match until Triple H tossed him stomach-first into the announcers table. Lesnar had some major problems with his stomach that led to him retiring from Ultimate Fighting Championship. After many knees to the gut, Triple H performed a Pedigree for a near-fall. Lesnar got back into the bout with a blatant low blow. He then connected with the F-5, but Triple H was able to kick out. Lesnar then put Triple H in the Kimura lock and refused to break it when Triple H reached the ropes. Triple H got out with a few shots to the body and then performed another Pedigree. When he went for the pin, Lesnar put Triple H in the Kimura lock again and the fallen Triple H could do nothing but submit. Following the match, Triple H seemed to be completely beat, and the announcers wondered whether he was going to retire.

== Aftermath ==
The following night on Raw, Dolph Ziggler challenged Chris Jericho to a rematch, to which the general manager AJ Lee made official, with the added stipulation that Ziggler's Money in the Bank contract and Jericho's WWE contract were on the line. Ziggler would go on to win the bout, resulting in Jericho being terminated from the company; this was done so Jericho could join his band Fozzy on their European tour. Jericho was eventually rehired and would later return at the 2013 Royal Rumble.

Later on during the same show, CM Punk announced his intentions of defending his WWE Championship against John Cena in the near future. On the August 27 episode of Raw, AJ announced that Punk would defend the title against Cena at Night of Champions, continuing their feud. Punk lost the WWE Championship at the 2013 Royal Rumble against The Rock.

Daniel Bryan and Kane continued their rivalry after the match, leading to the formation of Team Hell No. They would end up working together and getting along, including winning the WWE Tag Team Championship at Night of Champions.

Lastly, Brock Lesnar announced on Tout during the show that he had quit WWE since there was no more competition. In reality, Lesnar was taken off television as he had limited appearances on his contract. He would return on the January 28 episode of Raw. Triple H seemingly announced his retirement on the August 27 episode of Raw, but returned on the February 25, 2013, episode. The following week, which celebrated "Old School Raw", Triple H challenged Lesnar to a match at WrestleMania 29. Paul Heyman accepted the challenge and declared the match to be a No Holds Barred match, with the added stipulation that if Triple H lost, he would have to retire. On the April 1 episode of Raw, Shawn Michaels returned and announced that he would be in the corner of Triple H at WrestleMania. At WrestleMania, Triple H defeated Lesnar after hitting him with his signature Sledgehammer and the Pedigree on the steel steps in the ring. The two had their rubber match at Extreme Rules in a Steel Cage match, which Lesnar won.

== Results ==
No.	Results	Stipulations	Times
1^{P}	Antonio Cesaro (with Aksana) defeated Santino Marella (c) by pinfall	Singles match for the WWE United States Championship	5:08
2	Chris Jericho defeated Dolph Ziggler (with Vickie Guerrero) by submission	Singles match	13:07
3	Daniel Bryan defeated Kane by pinfall	Singles match	8:02
4	The Miz (c) defeated Rey Mysterio by pinfall	Singles match for the WWE Intercontinental Championship	9:09
5	Sheamus (c) defeated Alberto Del Rio (with Ricardo Rodriguez) by pinfall	Singles match for the World Heavyweight Championship	11:22
6	Kofi Kingston and R-Truth (c) defeated The Prime Time Players (Darren Young and Titus O'Neil) by pinfall	Tag team match for the WWE Tag Team Championship	7:06
7	CM Punk (c) defeated Big Show and John Cena by pinfall (Note: Originally, John Cena and CM Punk defeated Big Show by submission, but the match was restarted by AJ Lee.)	Triple threat match for the WWE Championship	12:34
8	Brock Lesnar (with Paul Heyman) defeated Triple H by submission	No Disqualification match (Note: The match was a regular singles match, however, Triple H would tell referee Scott Armstrong to not disqualify either men in the match.)	18:45
(c) / – the champion(s) heading into the match; P / – the match was broadcast on the pre-show
