= Night of Champions (2012) =

WWE pay-per-view event

- Promotional poster featuring John Cena and the WWE Championship
- Promotion: WWE
- Date: September 16, 2012
- City: Boston, Massachusetts
- Venue: TD Garden
- Attendance: 14,886
- Buy rate: 189,000

Pay-per-view chronology
← Previous; SummerSlam	Next → Hell in a Cell

Night of Champions chronology
← Previous; 2011	Next → 2013

The 2012 Night of Champions was a professional wrestling pay-per-view (PPV) event produced by WWE. It was the sixth annual Night of Champions and took place on September 16, 2012, at the TD Garden in Boston, Massachusetts. The theme of the event was that all six of WWE's active main roster championships at the time were defended. The event managed to gain 189,000 pay-per-view buys, which was up from last year's event, which gained a 169,000 buy rate.

Eight matches were contested at the event, including one on the Pre-Show. The main event, which saw CM Punk defend the WWE Championship against John Cena, ended in a double pinfall. In other prominent matches, Sheamus defeated Alberto Del Rio to retain the World Heavyweight Championship, Kane and Daniel Bryan defeated Kofi Kingston and R-Truth to win the WWE Tag Team Championship, and Eve Torres defeated Layla to win the WWE Divas Championship.

== Production ==
=== Background ===
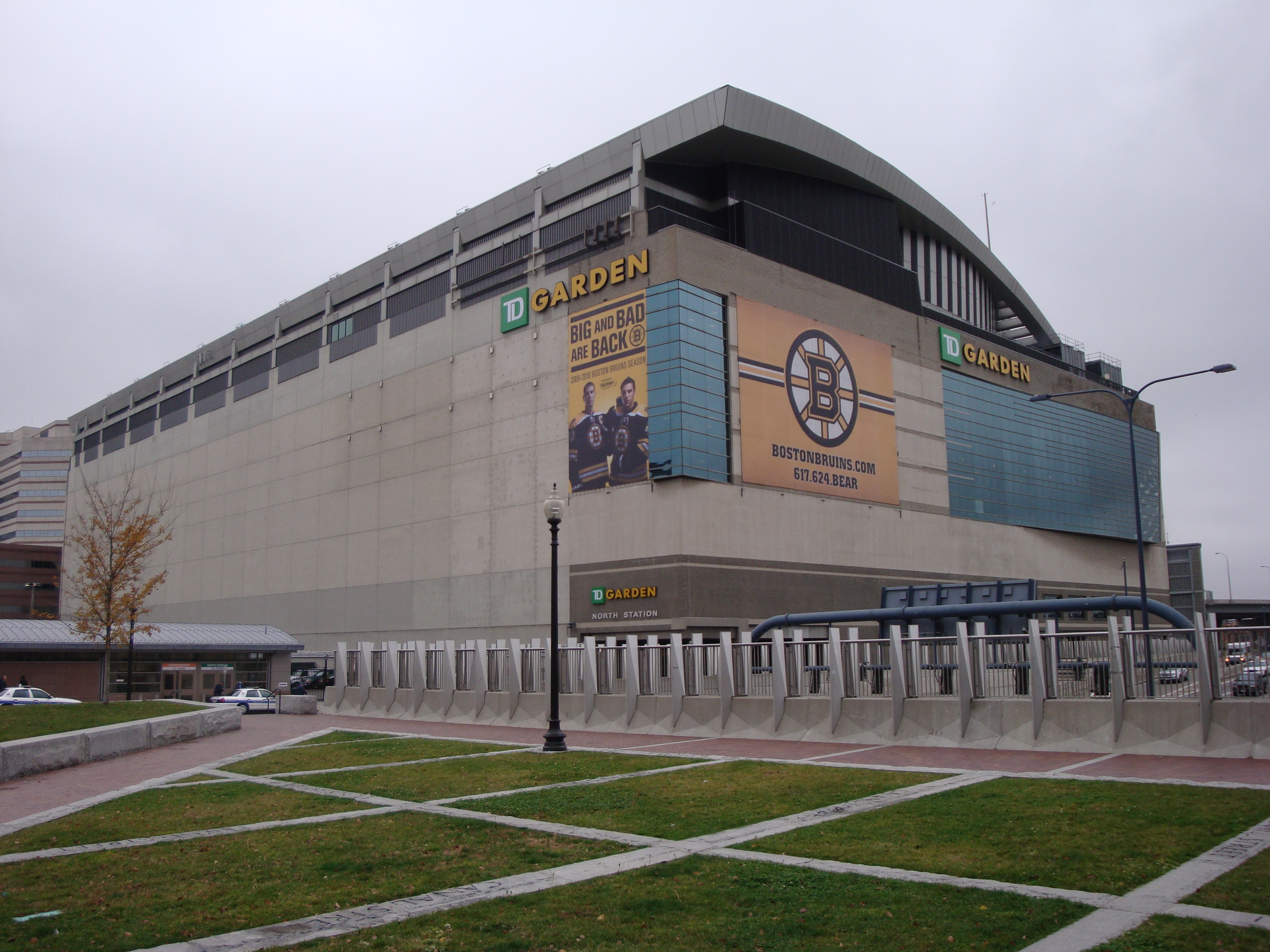
The sixth annual Night of Champions was held at the TD Garden in Boston, Massachusetts.

Night of Champions is a professional wrestling pay-per-view (PPV) event produced by WWE since 2007, with the event based around championship matches. The sixth event was held on September 16, 2012, at the TD Garden in Boston, Massachusetts. As per the theme of the event, every active championship promoted on WWE's main roster at the time was defended, which included the WWE Championship, the World Heavyweight Championship, the Intercontinental Championship, the United States Championship, the WWE Tag Team Championship, and the WWE Divas Championship. The specification of main roster championships came as a result of the establishment of WWE's developmental territory NXT earlier in the year, which had its own championship with two more introduced the following year.

=== Storylines ===
The event comprised eight matches, including one on the Pre-Show, that resulted from scripted storylines. Results were predetermined by WWE's writers, while storylines were produced on WWE's weekly television shows, Raw and SmackDown.

One featured match involved champion Sheamus against Alberto Del Rio for the World Heavyweight Championship. Upon being defeated by Sheamus again at SummerSlam, Del Rio felt that because the referee did not see that his foot was on the bottom rope during the pin, he deserved another chance at the championship. Sheamus felt that Del Rio had enough chances to beat him and said that Randy Orton, who just returned from suspension, deserved a chance at the championship. Del Rio defeated Orton to earn a title match at the event.

Another highly promoted match was CM Punk defending the WWE Championship against John Cena. At Raw 1000, Cena cashed in his Money in the Bank briefcase against Punk and failed to win the championship due to interference by Big Show that resulted in a disqualification. This led to a triple threat match at SummerSlam featuring Punk, Cena, and Show, which Punk won. The following night on Raw, Punk was granted the right to choose his challenger at Night of Champions. He announced that he would face John Cena on the condition that he would admit on live television that Punk was the "best in the world" but Cena refused. The following week, Raw General Manager AJ Lee announced that Punk would defend the title against Cena at the event.

== Event ==
Other on-screen personnel
Role:	Name:
English Commentators	Michael Cole
English Commentators	John "Bradshaw" Layfield
Spanish Commentators	Carlos Cabrera
Spanish Commentators	Marcelo Rodriguez
Backstage interviewer	Matt Striker
Ring announcers	Lilian Garcia
Ring announcers	Justin Roberts
Referees	Mike Chioda
Referees	Charles Robinson
Referees	Jack Doan
Referees	Scott Armstrong
Referees	Chad Patton

=== Pre-Show ===
Prior to the start of the pay-per-view, a 16-man battle royal for a United States Championship match later in the event took place. Zack Ryder won the match by last eliminating Tensai.

=== Preliminary matches ===
The event opened with The Miz defending the Intercontinental Championship against Cody Rhodes, Rey Mysterio, and Sin Cara in a fatal four-way match. In the end, Sin Cara placed a mask on Miz's head. Rhodes performed the Cross Rhodes on Sin Cara, but Miz, despite being blinded by the mask, performed the Skull-Crushing Finale on Rhodes to retain the title.

Next, Kofi Kingston and R-Truth defended the WWE Tag Team Championship against Kane and Daniel Bryan (later known as Team Hell No). The match ended when Bryan pushed Kane off the top rope, causing him to fall onto Kingston into a successful pinfall. As a result, Kane and Bryan won the titles. After the match, Kane and Bryan argue that they are the tag team champions.

After that, Antonio Cesaro defended the United States Championship against Zack Ryder. Cesaro executed a Neutralizer on Ryder to retain the title.

In the fourth match, Randy Orton wrestled Dolph Ziggler. Orton executed an elevated DDT off the barricade on Ziggler and attempted to pin Ziggler in the ring, but Ziggler placed his foot on the bottom rope, voiding the pinfall. In the end, Orton attempted an RKO, but Ziggler countered the move into a sleeper hold, which Orton escaped. Orton performed an RKO on a leaping Ziggler for the win.

Next, Layla defended the Divas Championship against Eve Torres. After Kaitlyn was attacked, SmackDown general manager Booker T scheduled Layla to defend against Eve. Eve executed the Heart Breaker on Layla to win the title for a record third time.

After that, Sheamus defended the World Heavyweight Championship against Alberto Del Rio. Before the match, Booker T relinquished his ban of the Brogue Kick. In the end, Del Rio missed a step-up enziguri on Sheamus, who was in the corner. Sheamus executed a Brogue Kick on Del Rio to retain the title.

=== Main event ===
In the main event, CM Punk defended the WWE Championship against John Cena. Punk applied the Anaconda vise on Cena, but Cena countered into the STF, which Punk countered into a crossface, which Cena escaped. Punk executed the diving elbow drop for a near-fall. Punk went for a GTS, but Cena countered into the STF, with Punk reaching the ropes to break the hold. Punk executed a Go To Sleep on Cena for a near-fall. Cena executed an Attitude Adjustment for a near-fall. Punk performed a second Go to Sleep on Cena for a near-fall. Punk performed a Rock Bottom on Cena for a near-fall. Cena executed another Attitude Adjustment on Punk for a near-fall. Cena executed a bridging German superplex off the top rope on Punk to win the match. As Cena was celebrating, the referee declared a draw due to a double pin, thus Punk retaining the title. When Cena stopped celebrating, Punk hit Cena with the title belt as he stood tall in the middle of the ring and exited with manager Paul Heyman to close the show.

== Results ==
No.	Results	Stipulations	Times
1^{P}	Zack Ryder won by last eliminating Tensai (Note: Order of elimination: Heath Slater, Michael McGillicutty, Ted DiBiase, Primo, Jinder Mahal, Epico, Justin Gabriel, Tyson Kidd, Brodus Clay, JTG, Drew McIntyre, Santino Marella, Titus O'Neil, Darren Young, and Tensai.)	16-man battle royal to determine the #1 contender to the WWE United States Championship	5:43
2	The Miz (c) defeated Cody Rhodes, Rey Mysterio, and Sin Cara by pinfall	Fatal four-way match for the WWE Intercontinental Championship	12:05
3	Kane and Daniel Bryan defeated Kofi Kingston and R-Truth (c) by pinfall	Tag team match for the WWE Tag Team Championship	8:30
4	Antonio Cesaro (c) (with Aksana) defeated Zack Ryder by pinfall	Singles match for the WWE United States Championship	6:40
5	Randy Orton defeated Dolph Ziggler (with Vickie Guerrero) by pinfall	Singles match	18:24
6	Eve Torres defeated Layla (c) by pinfall	Singles match for the WWE Divas Championship	7:05
7	Sheamus (c) defeated Alberto Del Rio (with David Otunga and Ricardo Rodriguez) by pinfall	Singles match for the World Heavyweight Championship	14:25
8	CM Punk (c) (with Paul Heyman) vs. John Cena ended in a draw	Singles match for the WWE Championship	26:55
(c) / – the champion(s) heading into the match; P / – the match was broadcast on the pre-show
