= WWE Divas Championship =

Former women's professional wrestling world championship

- The WWE Divas Championship belt (2014–2016)

Details
- Promotion: WWE
- Date established: June 6, 2008
- Date retired: April 3, 2016 (replaced with the WWE Women's Championship)

Other names
- WWE Divas Championship (2008–2016); Unified WWE Divas Championship (2010)
Statistics
- First champion: Michelle McCool
- Final champion: Charlotte
- Most reigns: 3 reigns: Eve Torres; AJ Lee
- Longest reign: Nikki Bella (2nd reign, 301 days) (Note: 300 days as recognized by WWE.)
- Shortest reign: Jillian Hall (5 minutes)
- Oldest champion: Layla (34 years, 92 days)
- Youngest champion: Paige (21 years, 233 days)
- Heaviest champion: Beth Phoenix (150 lb (68 kg))
- Lightest champion: Kelly Kelly (108 lb (49 kg))

The WWE Divas Championship was a women's professional wrestling world championship in WWE. The championship was created by WWE in 2008, and was introduced as part of the WWE brand extension via a storyline by then SmackDown General Manager Vickie Guerrero as an alternative to Raw's WWE Women's Championship. It is the first women’s singles championship to be created by WWE itself, as although WWE claims the Women’s Championship to be created in 1956, the company has only owned the title since 1984.

Michelle McCool became the inaugural champion on July 20, 2008, when she defeated Natalya at The Great American Bash. After then-WWE Divas Champion Maryse was drafted to Raw as part of the 2009 WWE draft, she took the title with her. McCool won a match against Melina to unify the WWE Divas and Women's titles at the Night of Champions pay-per-view on September 19, 2010, creating the Unified WWE Divas Championship; it eventually dropped the "Unified" moniker. The youngest woman to win the Divas Championship is Paige, at age 21.

The title was retired in 2016 at WrestleMania 32, after WWE Hall of Famer Lita revealed a brand-new Women's Championship to replace the Divas Championship. The match for the new title took place at the event between the reigning Divas Champion Charlotte and her opponents Becky Lynch and Sasha Banks in a triple threat match. Charlotte was the last Divas Champion.

== History ==
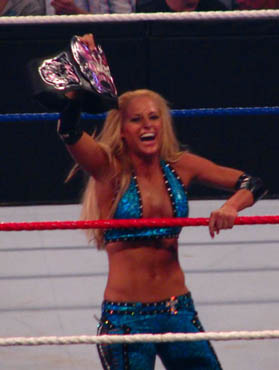
The inaugural champion Michelle McCool

With the first WWE brand extension in 2002, a storyline division in which WWE assigned its employees to different television programs and touring companies, the WWE Women's Championship was originally to be defended on both brands. At some point that year, however, it became exclusive to the Raw brand. Thereafter, only Divas on the Raw brand were able to compete for the title, while the Divas on the SmackDown brand were unable to compete for a women's-exclusive championship. However, on a few occasions, the regulation was bypassed with Melina, Ashley Massaro, Torrie Wilson, and Nidia challenging for the title while on the SmackDown brand, but none were successful.

As a result, WWE created the WWE Divas Championship and introduced it on the June 6, 2008, episode of SmackDown when then SmackDown General Manager Vickie Guerrero announced the creation of the title. On the June 6 and July 4, editions of SmackDown, Natalya and Michelle McCool won their respective Golden Dreams match (also involving Maryse, Victoria, Kelly Kelly, Cherry, and Layla) to qualify for the Divas Championship match. At The Great American Bash, McCool defeated Natalya to become the inaugural champion. When Maryse won the title from McCool in December 2008, she dislocated her kneecap at a live event later that month. Similar to how Trish Stratus kept the Women's Championship when she was sidelined with a herniated disc in 2005, Maryse was able to keep the Divas title upon her return in late January 2009. As part of the 2009 WWE draft, then Divas Champion Maryse was one of the people drafted to the Raw brand, in the process making the championship exclusive to Raw.

On January 4, 2010, WWE vacated the title after the current Divas Champion Melina sustained a torn anterior cruciate ligament. A tournament was started two weeks later on Raw, where former Divas Champion Maryse qualified over Brie Bella, Alicia Fox qualified over Kelly Kelly, Eve Torres qualified over Katie Lea Burchill, and Gail Kim qualified over former Divas Champion Jillian Hall. In the semifinals, Maryse defeated Eve Torres, and Gail Kim defeated Alicia Fox. On February 22 episode of Raw, Maryse defeated Gail Kim to win the vacant championship, making her the first person to hold the title on more than one occasion. It was announced on the August 30 episode of Raw that the Divas Championship would be unified with the Women's Championship at a match at Night of Champions. With that, the title (known briefly as the WWE Unified Divas Championship) became accessible to both WWE brands and the champion could appear on both shows, a situation made permanent by the ending of the brand extension in 2011. On September 16, 2012, Eve Torres became the first ever three-time WWE Divas Champion after defeating Layla at Night of Champions. In August 2014, the Divas Championship belt, along with all other pre-existing championship belts in WWE at the time, received a minor update, replacing the long-standing scratch logo with WWE's current logo originally used for the WWE Network that launched earlier that year in February.

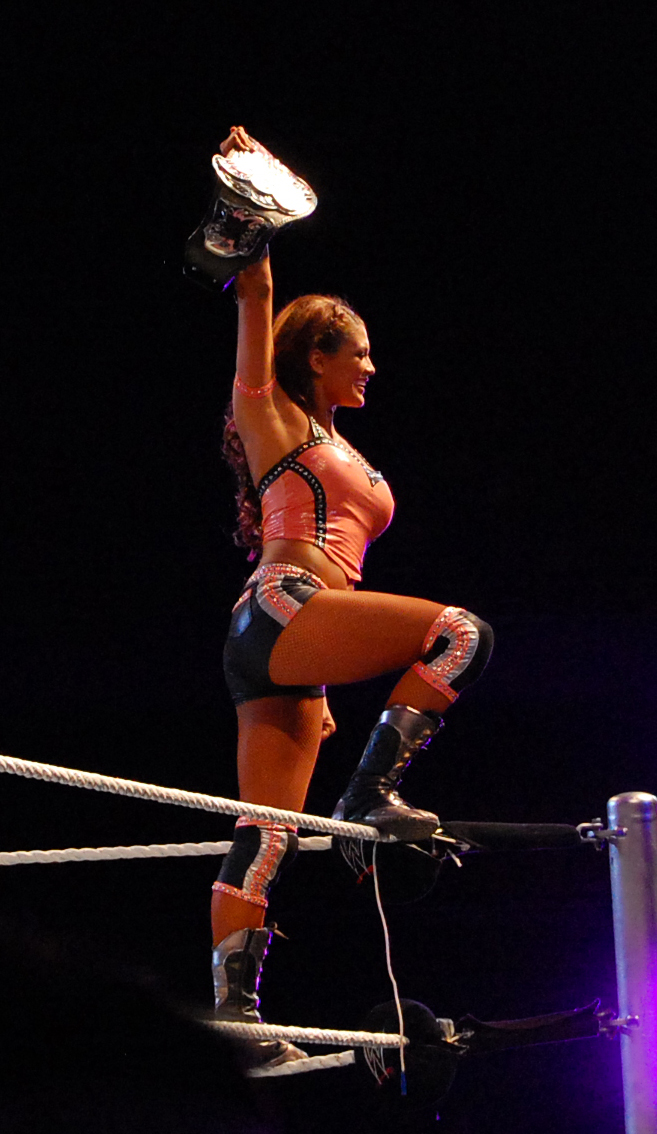
The first ever three-time Divas Champion Eve Torres

On April 6, 2014, AJ Lee became the first and only woman to defend the Divas Championship at WrestleMania for WrestleMania XXX.

On the WrestleMania 32 pre-show, former WWE Diva and Hall of Famer Lita announced that the scheduled triple threat match for the Divas Championship between Charlotte, Becky Lynch, and Sasha Banks was instead going to be for the new WWE Women's Championship (does not share the same lineage as the original WWE Women's Championship). It was also announced that the Divas Championship would be retired, and all female performers would become WWE Superstars in the process, subsequently retiring the term "Diva".

=== WWE Divas Championship Tournament (2010) ===
On January 4, 2010, WWE vacated the title after Divas Champion Melina sustained a torn anterior cruciate ligament. A tournament started two weeks later on Raw. The tournament final was originally scheduled at Elimination Chamber, but when official consultant to the SmackDown General Manager Vickie Guerrero interrupted, she announced that she was changing the match to an interbrand Divas tag team match, with Maryse and Gail Kim facing LayCool (Michelle McCool and Layla) from SmackDown. The final was held the following night on Raw. On February 22 episode of Raw, Maryse defeated Gail Kim to win the vacant title, making her the first person to hold the title on more than one occasion.

Quarterfinals; Raw; January 4–11, 2010; Superstars; January 5, 2010 (Aired: January 7)
Maryse	Pinfall
Brie Bella	2:18
Eve Torres	Pinfall
Katie Lea Burchill	1:53
Kelly Kelly	2:01
Alicia Fox	Pinfall
Gail Kim	Pinfall
Jillian Hall	3:10

Semifinals; Raw; January 25, 2010
Maryse	Pinfall
Eve Torres	2:05
Alicia Fox	1:55
Gail Kim	Pinfall

Final; Raw; February 22, 2010
Maryse	Pinfall
Gail Kim	2:50

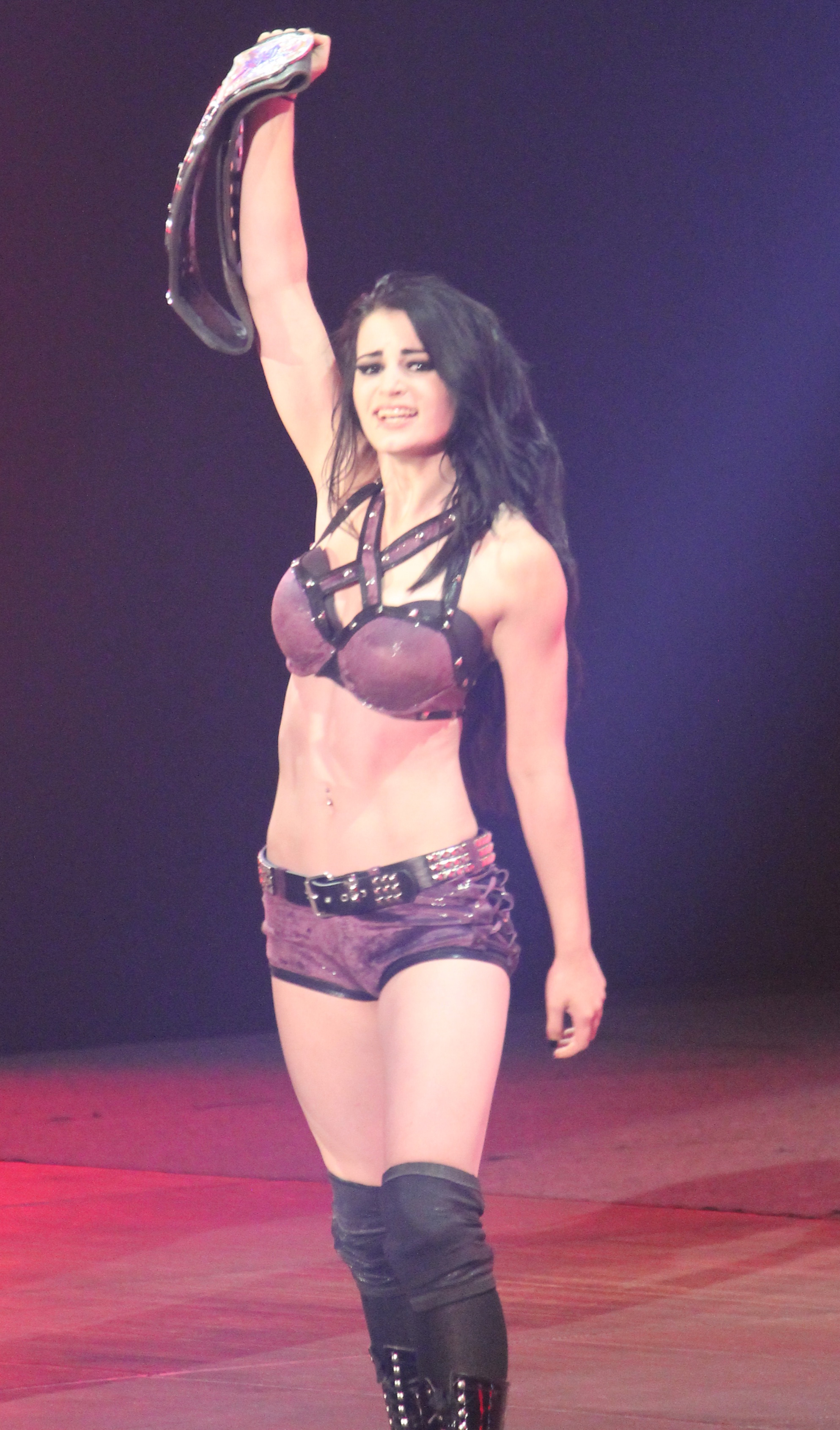
Paige was the youngest Divas Champion. She won the title on her main roster debut at the age of 21. She was also the NXT Women's Champion when she won the WWE Divas Championship, but was forced to vacate the NXT title after winning the Divas.

== Brand designation history ==
The following is a list of dates indicating the transitions of the Divas Championship between the Raw and SmackDown brands.

Date of transition	Brand	Notes
June 6, 2008	SmackDown	Championship established for SmackDown as the counterpart to Raw's WWE Women's Championship. Michelle McCool became the inaugural Divas Champion at The Great American Bash.
April 13, 2009	Raw	Divas Champion Maryse was drafted to Raw during the 2009 WWE Draft.
September 19, 2010	N/A	At Night of Champions, Michelle McCool unified the Divas Championship with the Women's Championship. The Women's Championship was retired and the Divas Championship became briefly known as the Unified WWE Divas Championship and defended on both Raw and SmackDown.
August 29, 2011	N/A	End of first brand extension. In April 2016, the Divas Championship was retired and replaced by a new WWE Women's Championship.

== Reigns ==
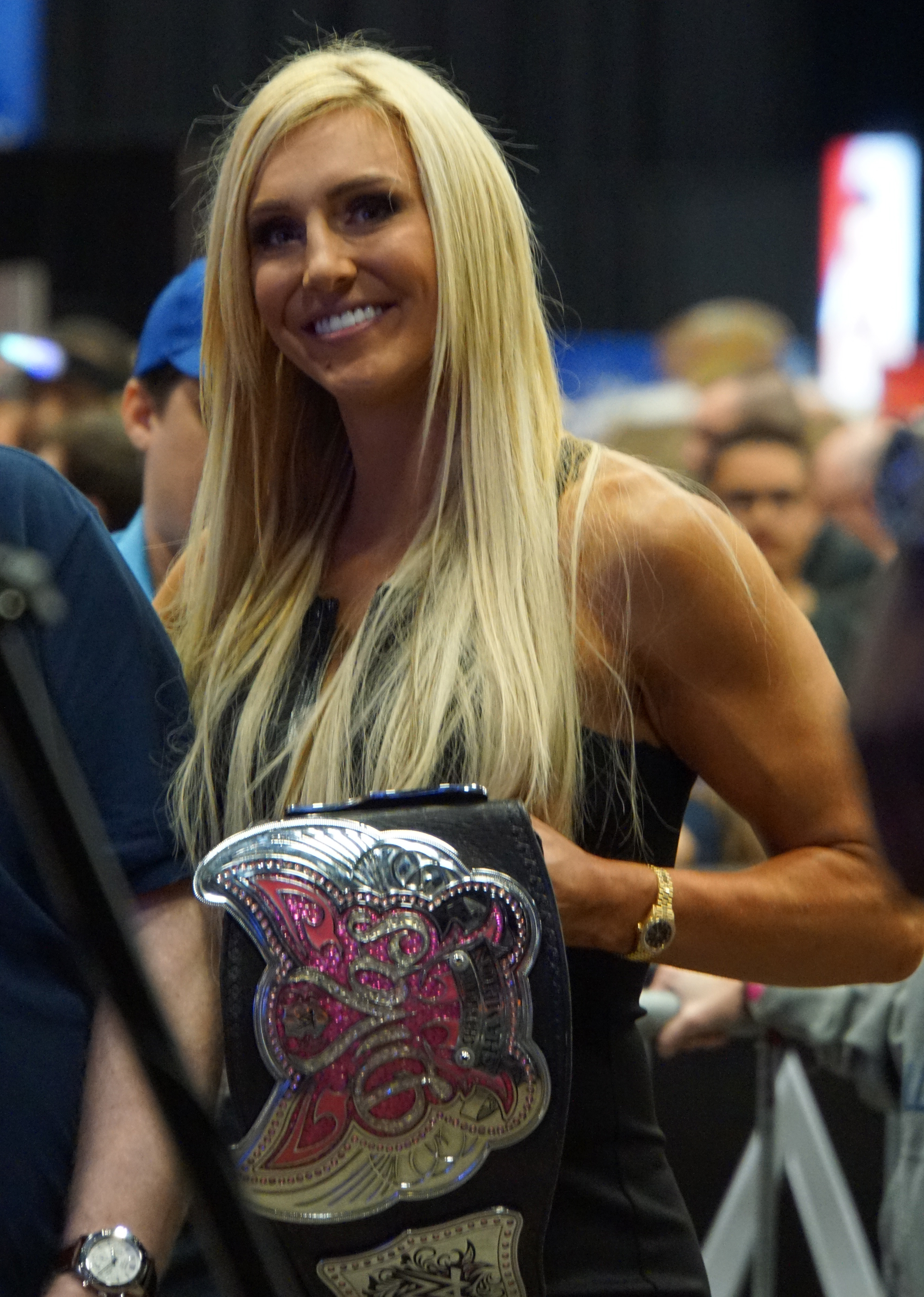
The final champion Charlotte

There were 26 total reigns and 1 vacancy. The inaugural champion was Michelle McCool, who defeated Natalya to win the title at The Great American Bash on July 20, 2008.

Eve Torres and AJ Lee held the record for most reigns as Divas Champion with three each. AJ Lee held the record for most combined days as champion with 406 days, while Nikki Bella held the record for longest individual reign at 301 days. Jillian Hall had the shortest reign at five minutes. Layla was the oldest Divas Champion, having won at the age of 34, while Paige was the youngest Divas Champion in history at 21 years of age, and was also the only woman to win the title in her debut.

The final champion was Charlotte, who was in her first and only reign. She defeated Nikki Bella on September 20, 2015, at Night of Champions in Houston, Texas to win the title. Charlotte was originally scheduled to defend the title at WrestleMania 32 against Sasha Banks and Becky Lynch, but during the event it was announced that the scheduled triple threat match would instead be for the new WWE Women's Championship (also known as the Raw Women's Championship from 2016 to 2023), with the Divas Championship subsequently being retired. Charlotte won the match and the Women's Championship; this ended her reign as Divas Champion and began a new reign as Women's Champion.

== Notes ==
Sporting positions
Preceded by WWE Women's Championship (original version)	WWE's top women's championship 2008–2016	Succeeded by WWE Women's Championship and Women's World Championship
