= SummerSlam (2015) =

WWE pay-per-view and livestreaming event

- Promotional poster featuring Brock Lesnar and The Undertaker
- Promotion: WWE
- Date: August 23, 2015
- City: Brooklyn, New York (Note: The SummerSlam was originally scheduled to be held at the Izod Center in East Rutherford, New Jersey.)
- Venue: Barclays Center
- Attendance: 15,702
- Buy rate: 121,000 (excluding WWE Network views)

WWE event chronology
← Previous; NXT TakeOver: Brooklyn	Next → Night of Champions

SummerSlam chronology
← Previous; 2014	Next → 2016

The 2015 SummerSlam was a professional wrestling pay-per-view (PPV) and livestreaming event produced by WWE. It was the 28th annual SummerSlam and took place on August 23, 2015, at the Barclays Center in the New York City borough of Brooklyn, New York. This was the first of four consecutive SummerSlam events to take place at the arena.

Ten matches were contested at the event. In the main event, The Undertaker defeated Brock Lesnar that had a controversial finish; Lesnar put The Undertaker in his Kimura lock submission hold and the timekeeper rang the bell after seeing The Undertaker tap out, but since the referee did not see The Undertaker submit, the match continued. The confusion allowed The Undertaker to surprise Lesnar with a low blow before trapping him in the Hell's Gate submission hold, which caused Lesnar to pass out, giving The Undertaker the win.

The event was the second night of what was billed as a "triple-header" at the Barclays Center, with NXT TakeOver: Brooklyn taking place the preceding night, and then Raw the following night. It was the first SummerSlam since 2008 to be held outside of Los Angeles, California as its Staples Center hosted SummerSlam from 2009 to 2014. It was also the eighth SummerSlam to be held in the New York metropolitan area. The Izod Center in East Rutherford, New Jersey was originally supposed to host SummerSlam, but due to its closure in April 2015, the event was relocated. It was also the first SummerSlam to be four hours in length, a length previously reserved only for WrestleMania. This was also the last SummerSlam held before the reintroduction of the brand extension in July 2016.

== Production ==
=== Background ===
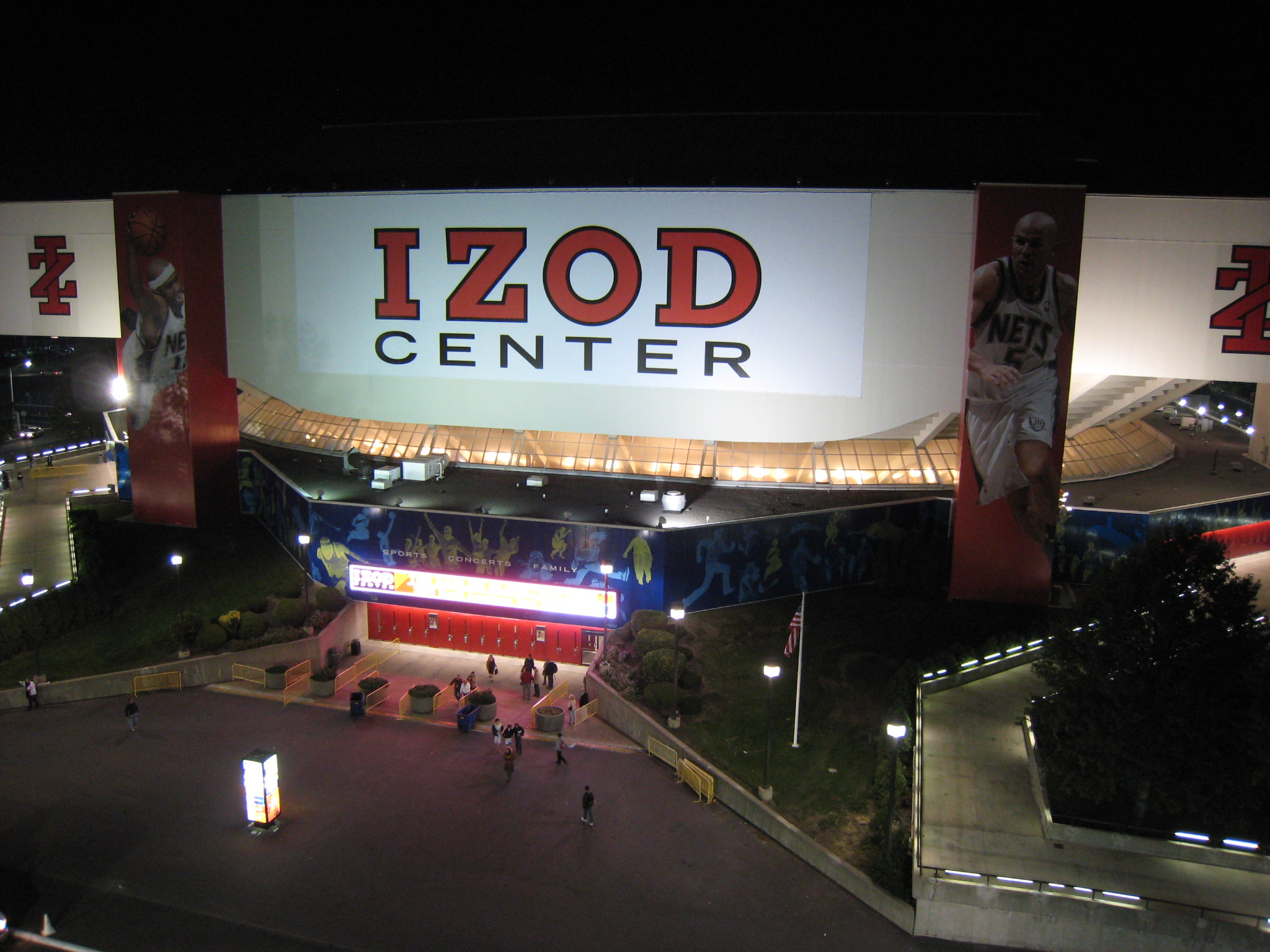
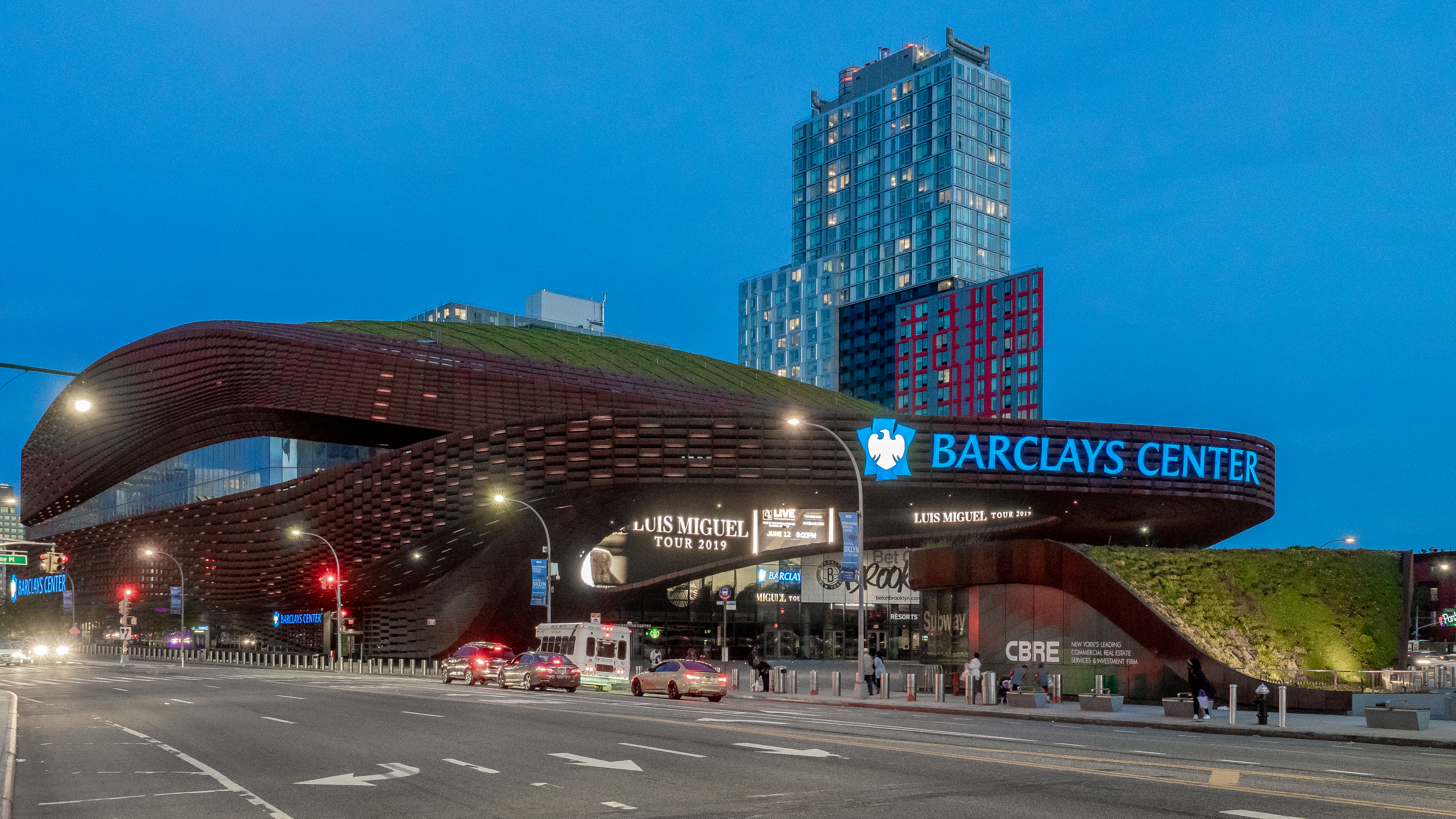
The 28th annual SummerSlam was originally set to take place at the Izod Center in East Rutherford, New Jersey, but due to its closure in April 2015, the event was relocated to the Barclays Center in Brooklyn, New York and was the first of four consecutive SummerSlam events at the venue.

SummerSlam is an annual professional wrestling event produced every August by WWE since 1988. It was originally broadcast exclusively via pay-per-view (PPV) before it began simultaneously livestreaming on the WWE Network in 2014. Dubbed "The Biggest Party of the Summer", it is one of the promotion's original four PPVs, along with WrestleMania, Royal Rumble, and Survivor Series, referred to as the "Big Four". It has since become considered WWE's second biggest event of the year behind WrestleMania. Announced on October 13, 2014, the 28th SummerSlam was scheduled to be held on August 23, 2015, at the Barclays Center in the New York City borough of Brooklyn, New York.

The Izod Center in East Rutherford, New Jersey was originally booked to host SummerSlam (which would have been the fourth SummerSlam held at this venue after the 1989, 1997, and 2007 events), but due to its closure in April 2015, the event was moved to the Barclays Center. Tickets went on sale on March 14 through Ticketmaster. Additionally, WWE increased SummerSlam's length to four hours, a length previously reserved only for WrestleMania. The event was also scheduled as the second night of what WWE billed as a "triple-header" at the Barclays Center, with NXT TakeOver: Brooklyn having taken place the previous night, and then Raw the following night.

=== Storylines ===
The event comprised 10 matches that resulted from scripted storylines. Results were predetermined by WWE's writers, while storylines were produced on WWE's weekly television shows, Raw and SmackDown.

At WrestleMania XXX in 2014, Brock Lesnar defeated The Undertaker to end his undefeated WrestleMania streak. Four months later, Lesnar defeated John Cena at SummerSlam to win the WWE World Heavyweight Championship, but lost it the following year at WrestleMania 31 in his match against Roman Reigns when Seth Rollins cashed in his Money in the Bank contract and won the championship. Lesnar received his rematch against Rollins at Battleground, and was closing in on the win when The Undertaker returned and attacked Lesnar, causing Lesnar to win by disqualification, but not win the championship. The following night, a rematch between Lesnar and The Undertaker was scheduled for SummerSlam. This would be The Undertaker's first SummerSlam match since 2008, and his first pay-per-view match outside of WrestleMania since Bragging Rights in October 2010.

Ryback won the Intercontinental Championship in an Elimination Chamber match at Elimination Chamber. On the June 1 episode of Raw, Ryback was scheduled to make his first title defense against The Miz, but Big Show attacked The Miz, preventing the match from occurring, and confronted Ryback. At Money in the Bank, Big Show defeated Ryback by disqualification after Miz attacked him; therefore, Ryback retained the championship. On June 22, Ryback was scheduled to defend the title against Big Show and Miz in a triple threat match at Battleground, but after Ryback sustained an injury, the match was postponed and, on August 6, rescheduled for SummerSlam.

At Money in the Bank, Bray Wyatt attacked Roman Reigns during the Money in the Bank ladder match, preventing him from winning the match. At Battleground, Wyatt defeated Reigns after Luke Harper interfered and attacked Reigns, reuniting The Wyatt Family with Wyatt in the process. On the July 20 episode of Raw, Dean Ambrose managed Reigns as he defeated Harper by disqualification. On the August 6 episode of SmackDown, Reigns challenged Wyatt to a tag team match at SummerSlam, with Reigns and Ambrose facing Wyatt and Harper, which Wyatt accepted.

On the June 18 episode of SmackDown, Alicia Fox allied with The Bella Twins (Brie Bella and Divas Champion Nikki Bella) by helping Brie win her match against Paige, forming "Team Bella". On the July 13 episode of Raw, Charlotte, Becky Lynch, and NXT Women's Champion Sasha Banks made their WWE debuts; Charlotte and Lynch allied with Paige, later naming their team "PCB", while Banks allied with Naomi and Tamina, naming their group "Team B.A.D.". At Battleground, Charlotte defeated Brie and Banks in a Triple Threat match. On August 10, it was announced that Team Bella, PCB, and Team B.A.D were scheduled to compete against each other in a Three-Team Elimination match at SummerSlam.

At Battleground, The Prime Time Players (Darren Young and Titus O'Neil defeated The New Day (Big E and Kofi Kingston) (with Xavier Woods) to retain the WWE Tag Team Championship. On the July 20 episode of Raw, Los Matadores (Diego and Fernando) defeated the Prime Time Players, after a distraction by the New Day. On the July 27 episode of Raw, The Lucha Dragons (Kalisto and Sin Cara) defeated Los Matadores. On the July 30 episode of SmackDown, The Lucha Dragons and Los Matadores defeated The New Day and The Ascension (Konnor and Viktor). On the August 3 episode of Raw, The New Day and The Ascension defeated The Lucha Dragons and Los Matadores in a rematch. On the August 6 episode of SmackDown, The Prime Time Players teamed up with Mark Henry to defeat The New Day. On the August 10 episode of Raw, The New Day defeated Los Matadores. The Prime Time Players were then scheduled to defend the championship against The New Day, Los Matadores, and The Lucha Dragons in a fatal four-way tag team match at SummerSlam.

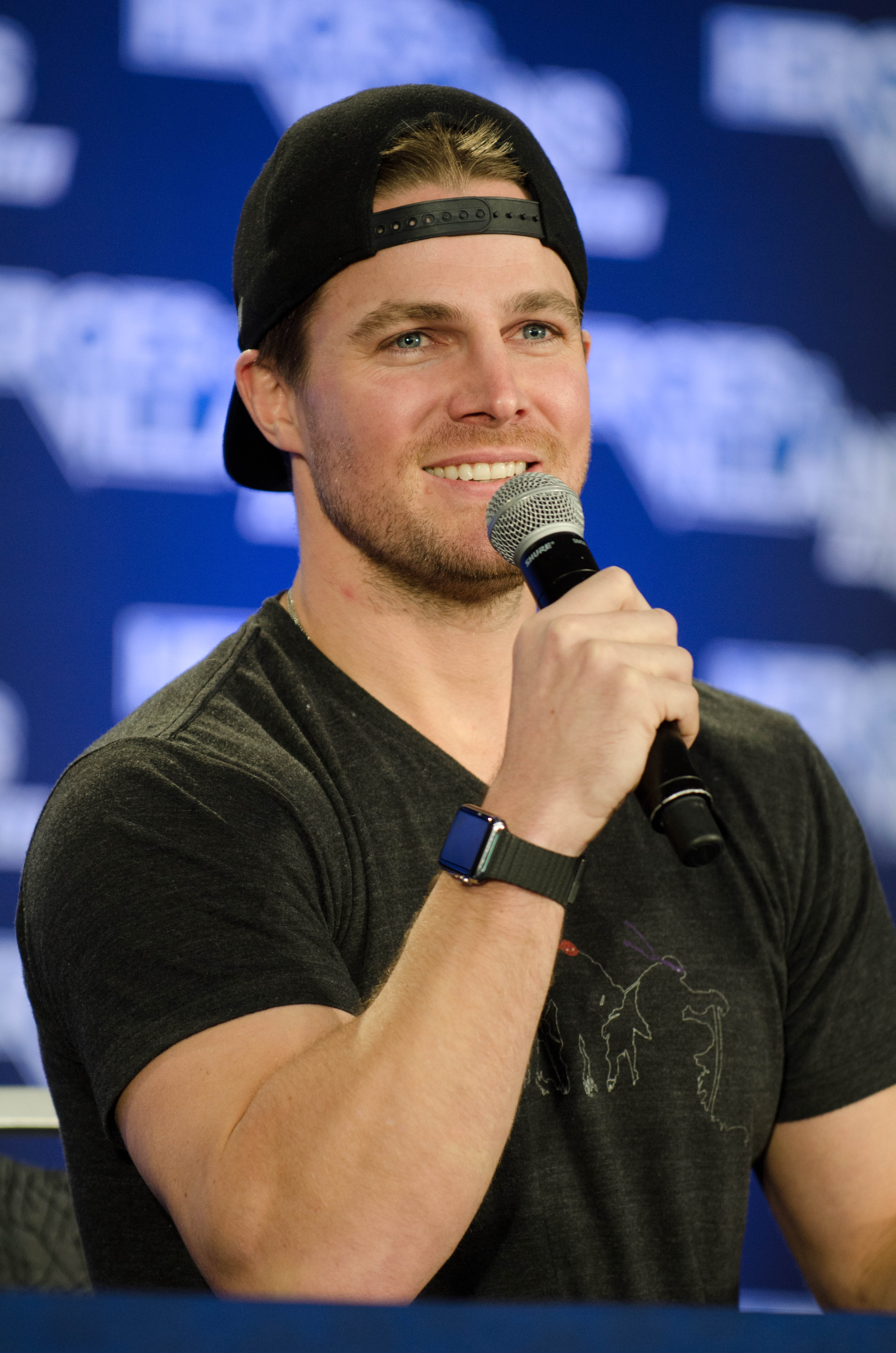
Stephen Amell teamed up with Neville to face Stardust and King Barrett.

On the May 25 episode of Raw, Stardust confronted special guest Stephen Amell while losing to Neville. On the July 13 episode of Raw, Stardust defeated Neville. On the August 10 episode of Raw, where Amell was again a special guest, Neville defeated King Barrett, but was then attacked by Stardust. Stardust then assaulted Amell, who entered the ring and attacked Stardust in return. Amell and Neville then persuaded Triple H backstage to make a tag team match at SummerSlam, with Amell and Neville facing Stardust and Barrett.

On the July 20 episode of Raw, United States Champion John Cena challenged WWE World Heavyweight Champion Seth Rollins to a championship match, but Rollins refused. On the July 27 episode of Raw, Cena again challenged Rollins, but The Authority instead forced him to defend the United States Championship against Rollins. Cena defeated Rollins, but sustained a broken nose during the match. On the August 3 episode of Raw, Rollins challenged Cena to a "Winner Takes All" match at SummerSlam, for both the WWE World Heavyweight Championship and the United States Championship. On the August 11 episode of Tough Enough, Cena accepted Rollins' challenge.

On the June 18 episode of SmackDown, Kevin Owens defeated Cesaro. On the June 29 episode of Raw, Cesaro defeated United States Champion John Cena by disqualification after being attacked by Owens, therefore not winning the championship. On the July 20 episode of Raw, Cesaro teamed up with Cena and Randy Orton to defeat Owens, Rusev and Sheamus. On the July 23 episode of SmackDown, Owens attacked Cesaro after his match against Seth Rollins. On the July 27 episode of Raw, Cesaro attacked Owens after his match against Orton. On the July 30 episode of SmackDown, after Owens attacked Cesaro during his rematch against Rollins, Dean Ambrose and Cesaro defeated Owens and Rollins in a tag team match. On the August 13 episode of SmackDown, Cesaro was set to face Owens at SummerSlam.

At Battleground, Randy Orton defeated Sheamus. On the July 20 episode of Raw, Orton, John Cena and Cesaro defeated Sheamus, Kevin Owens and Rusev. On the July 27 episode of Raw, Sheamus attacked Orton during his match against Owens. On the August 3 episode of Raw, Orton, Dean Ambrose and Roman Reigns defeated Sheamus, Bray Wyatt and Luke Harper. On the August 10 episode of Raw, Orton defeated WWE World Heavyweight Champion Seth Rollins by disqualification after being attacked by Sheamus, therefore not winning the championship. Sheamus then attempted to cash in his Money in the Bank contract on Rollins, but was stopped by Orton. On August 17, a match between Orton and Sheamus was scheduled for SummerSlam.

On the May 18 episode of Raw, Lana ended her association with Rusev and started a relationship with Dolph Ziggler, turning face in the process (storyline). After making numerous unsuccessful attempts to sway Lana from Ziggler, Rusev started a relationship with Summer Rae (storyline). On the July 6 episode of Raw, Rusev attacked Ziggler, resulting in Ziggler sustaining a throat injury. On the August 17 episode of Raw, Ziggler returned and attacked Rusev. The same night, Ziggler was set to wrestle Rusev at SummerSlam.

On the August 17 episode of Raw, Jon Stewart was announced as the special guest host for the event.

== Event ==
Other on-screen personnel
Role:	Name:
English commentators	Michael Cole
English commentators	Jerry Lawler
English commentators	John "Bradshaw" Layfield
Spanish commentators	Carlos Cabrera
Spanish commentators	Marcelo Rodríguez
Spanish commentators	Jerry Soto
French commentators	Philippe Chéreau
French commentators	Christophe Agius
Backstage interviewers	Rich Brennan
Backstage interviewers	JoJo
Ring announcers	Lilian Garcia
Ring announcers	Eden Stiles
Referees	Charles Robinson
Referees	Mike Chioda
Referees	John Cone
Referees	Darrick Moore
Referees	Chad Patton
Referees	Ryan Tran
Referees	Rod Zapata
Pre-show panel	Renee Young
Pre-show panel	Booker T
Pre-show panel	Byron Saxton
Pre-show panel	Corey Graves

=== Preliminary matches ===
In the first match, Randy Orton faced Sheamus. The match ended when Orton attempted an "RKO" on Sheamus, however, Sheamus countered and executed two "Brogue Kicks" on Orton to win the match.

Next, The Prime Time Players (Darren Young and Titus O'Neil) defended the WWE Tag Team Championship against The New Day (Big E and Kofi Kingston), The Lucha Dragons (Kalisto and Sin Cara), and Los Matadores (Diego and Fernando) in a fatal four-way tag team match. The ending saw O'Neil executed the "Clash of the Titus" on Fernando but Big E pulled O'Neil out of the ring. Kingston pinned Fernando to win the titles.

After that, Dolph Ziggler faced Rusev. In the climax, Rusev applied the "Accolade" on Ziggler but Lana attacked Summer Rae, distracting Rusev. Ziggler performed a Superkick on Rusev, knocking him onto a broadcast table. The match ended in a double countout.

In the fourth match, Stephen Amell and Neville faced Stardust and King Barrett. Neville executed a "Red Arrow" on Barrett to win the match.

The next match was a triple threat match for the WWE Intercontinental Championship between Big Show, The Miz, and defending champion Ryback. The end came when Big Show executed a "KO Punch" on Miz but Ryback knocked Big Show out of the ring with a Clothesline. Ryback pinned Miz to retain the title.

In the sixth match, Roman Reigns and Dean Ambrose faced The Wyatt Family (Bray Wyatt and Luke Harper). As Wyatt attempted "Sister Abigail" on Ambrose, Ambrose countered and executed "Dirty Deeds" on Wyatt. Reigns executed a Spear on Wyatt to win the match.

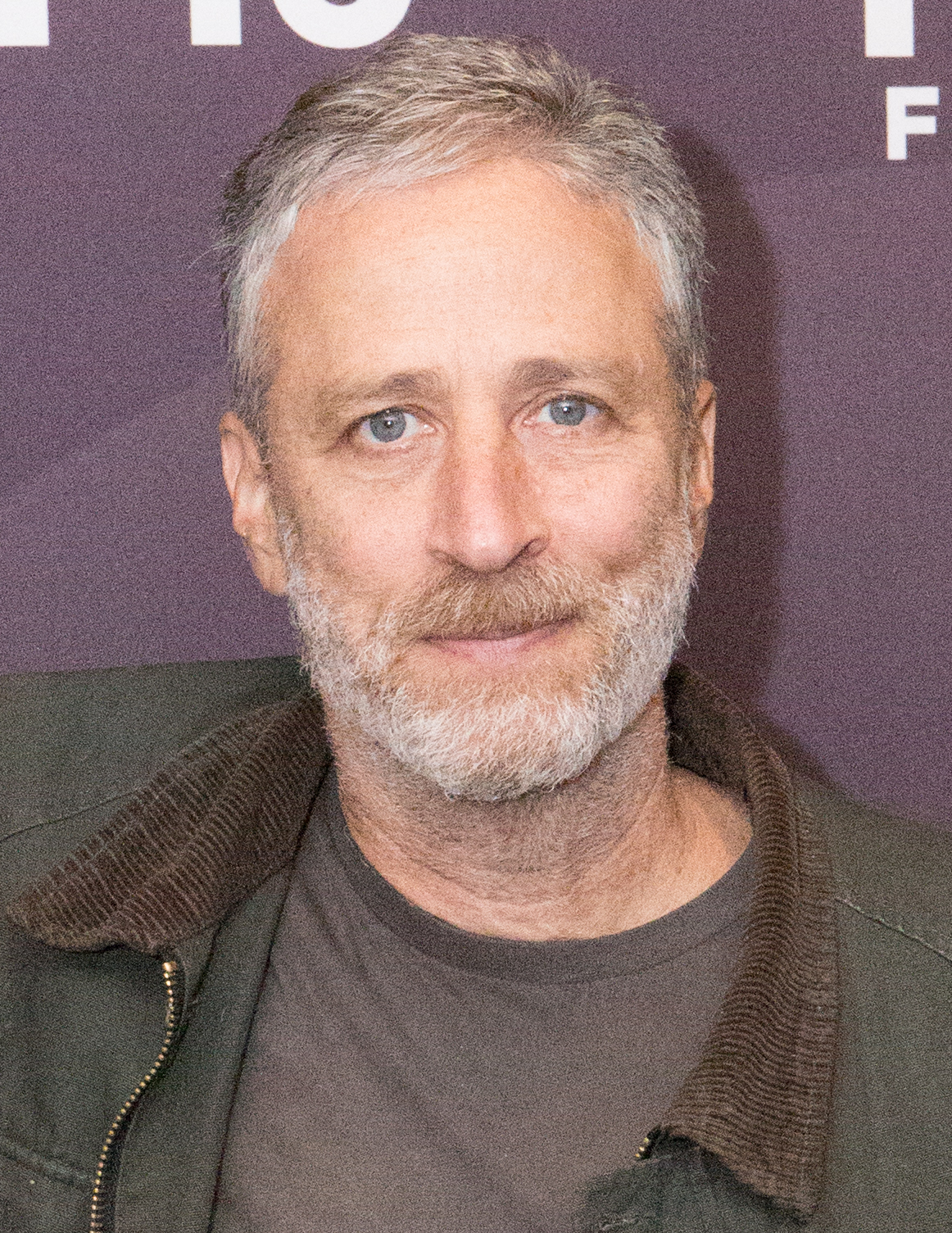
Comedian Jon Stewart hosted the event and got involved in Seth Rollins' match with John Cena.

The seventh match was a Winner Takes All match for both the WWE World Heavyweight Championship and the WWE United States Championship between WWE World Heavyweight Champion Seth Rollins and United States Champion John Cena. Cena executed an "Attitude Adjustment" on Rollins for a near-fall. Rollins executed an "Attitude Adjustment" on Cena for a near-fall. As Rollins attempted a "Pedigree," Cena countered and applied the Figure Four Leglock on Rollins. Rollins countered but Cena reached the ropes, forcing Rollins to break the hold. Cena executed a second "Attitude Adjustment", but in the process, Rollins inadvertently kicked the referee. Jon Stewart, the host of SummerSlam, ran to the ring with a chair, assumingly helping Cena but struck Cena with the chair. Rollins took advantage and executed a "Pedigree" on Cena on the chair. Rollins then pinned Cena to win the match.

The next match was a three-team elimination match between The Bella Twins (Divas Champion Nikki Bella, Brie Bella, and Alicia Fox), Team B.A.D. (Sasha Banks, Naomi, and Tamina) and Team PCB (Paige, Charlotte, and Becky Lynch). Brie Bella eliminated Team BAD by pinning Tamina after a diving "Bella Buster". Lynch pinned Brie after a Pumphandle Uranage to win the match for Team PCB.

After that, Kevin Owens faced Cesaro. Owens executed a Pop Up Powerbomb on Cesaro to win the match.

=== Main event ===
In the main event, Brock Lesnar (with Paul Heyman) faced The Undertaker. During the match, The Undertaker attempted a Chokeslam on Lesnar but Lesnar countered the attempt and executed three German Suplexes. Lesnar executed an "F-5" through a broadcast table on The Undertaker. The Undertaker executed a Chokeslam and a "Tombstone Piledriver" on Lesnar for a near-fall. Lesnar applied a "Kimura lock" on The Undertaker but The Undertaker touched the ropes, forcing Lesnar to break the hold. The Undertaker performed a "Last Ride" on Lesnar for a near-fall. Lesnar executed two "F-5s" on The Undertaker, both for near-falls. In the climax of the match, The Undertaker applied "Hell's Gate" on Lesnar, who countered the move and put The Undertaker in another "Kimura Lock". At that time, the timekeeper rang the bell after seeing The Undertaker supposedly indicating submission; since the referee hadn't seen a submission and never stopped the match, the match continued. Thinking himself the winner, Lesnar released the hold. Whilst the referee argued with the timekeeper, The Undertaker surprised Lesnar with a low blow and applied "Hell's Gate" again; Lesnar refused to submit, giving The Undertaker the middle finger before passing out to give The Undertaker the win. After the match, Heyman rang the timekeeper's bell and declared Lesnar the winner.

== Reception ==
The event received positive reviews, with much of the criticism going to the endings of the "Winner Take All" and the Undertaker/Brock Lesnar matches. Will Purett from Pro Wrestling Dot Net said the two main matches had bad endings. Purett was "infuriated by the finish in Undertaker vs. Brock Lesnar" because "wrestling finishes in 2015 based on incompetent refereeing are bad ideas." Also, he criticized the idea of the Undertaker as the first man who defeated Lesnar in a singles match since WrestleMania 29, saying that "The Streak, [...] was sacrificed for a retirement tour". Jason Powell of Pro Wrestling Dot Net praised the Cena vs. Rollins and the Undertaker vs. Lesnar, but likewise criticized both finishes.

Benjamin Tucker of Pro Wrestling Torch attended in person both WWE SummerSlam and NXT TakeOver: Brooklyn (a day earlier in the same venue). He gave TakeOver a 9.0 score, noting that it was "met with near-universal praise", higher than SummerSlam, which rated 6.5 and "was met with ridicule and scorn by the night's end". Tucker criticized SummerSlam in comparison to TakeOver, saying that "the main show writing could learn something from NXT, not WCW 2000", because "NXT provided simple stories, but they were easy to follow and made the viewer root for the good guys to prevail", in addition to "no chicanery". Yet SummerSlam had convoluted stories, "confusingly-presented characters" and "terrible" swerves. Tucker also felt that none of the SummerSlam matches reached the level of the NXT Women's Championship match the night before, "but the main event was wrestled well, as was Owens-Cesaro, Sheamus-Orton, Rollins-Cena (the probable match of the night)".

== Aftermath ==
After winning the WWE United States Championship and retaining the WWE World Heavyweight Championship against John Cena, Seth Rollins was confronted and attacked on the following night's Raw by a returning Sting, who grabbed the WWE World Heavyweight Championship belt, signaling a challenge for the title. The match was set for Night of Champions. Jon Stewart also revealed that he had interfered on behalf of Rollins in order to prevent Cena from tying Ric Flair's record of World championships, who Stewart is a huge fan of. Stewart was confronted by Flair, who told him that he doesn't mind having his record tied or broken by someone who he respects, and John Cena hit Stewart with an Attitude Adjustment before leaving. A rematch for the United States Championship was granted by The Authority as they stated that all championship titles will be on the line, forcing Rollins to defend both titles back-to-back at Night of Champions.

Following the controversial loss to The Undertaker, Brock Lesnar and Paul Heyman called out The Undertaker for one last match that night but instead Bo Dallas appeared and attempted to convince Lesnar to start "Bo-lieving". Lesnar responded by delivering a number of German suplexes on Dallas, and ending the beatdown with an F-5 before leaving. At Night of Champions, a Hell in a Cell match to settle the feud between Lesnar and Undertaker was scheduled for Hell in a Cell.

After Roman Reigns and Dean Ambrose's victory over The Wyatt Family, a rematch was booked the following night on Raw. Midway through the match, a mysterious man (later revealed to be Braun Strowman) interfered on behalf of The Wyatt Family. The new Wyatt Family challenged Reigns and Ambrose to a six-man tag match at Night of Champions. Reigns and Ambrose refused to reveal their partner until right before the match.

On the following night's Raw, The New Day (Big E and Kofi Kingston, with Xavier Woods) defeated The Lucha Dragons (Sin Cara and Kalisto). After the match, The Dudley Boyz (Bubba Ray Dudley and D-Von Dudley) made their return to WWE, performing a 3D on Woods through a table and confronting The Prime Time Players (Darren Young and Titus O'Neil). The New Day would go on to retain their titles through 2015 and 2016. On December 13, 2016, The New Day's reigns reached 479 days, officially breaking the record set by Demolition to become the longest single reign in WWE history. Five days later, at the pay-per-view Roadblock: End of the Line, they lost the titles to Cesaro and Sheamus.

Kevin Owens started setting his sights on the WWE Intercontinental Championship, leading to a feud with champion Ryback. On the September 7 episode of Raw, Owens interrupted Ryback's interview and then attacked him, costing him a lumberjack match against Seth Rollins on the September 10 episode of SmackDown while Owens was one of the Lumberjacks. On the September 14 episode of Raw, Ryback was granted permission by The Authority to defend the Intercontinental Championship against Owens at Night of Champions.

The 2015 SummerSlam was the last SummerSlam to occur before the reintroduction of the brand extension in July 2016, which again split the main roster between the Raw and SmackDown brands, where wrestlers were exclusively assigned to perform. As such, another world championship was introduced. After the WWE World Heavyweight Championship became exclusive to SmackDown and renamed to WWE Championship, the WWE Universal Championship was introduced for Raw with its inaugural champion crowned at the 2016 SummerSlam. This was also the last SummerSlam to feature the Divas Championship as it was retired and replaced by a new WWE Women's Championship during the WrestleMania 32 pre-show in April 2016.

== Results ==
No.	Results	Stipulations	Times
1	Sheamus defeated Randy Orton by pinfall	Singles match	12:28
2	The New Day (Big E and Kofi Kingston) (with Xavier Woods) defeated The Prime Time Players (Darren Young and Titus O'Neil) (c), Los Matadores (Diego and Fernando) (with El Torito) and The Lucha Dragons (Kalisto and Sin Cara) by pinfall	Fatal four-way tag team match for the WWE Tag Team Championship	11:20
3	Dolph Ziggler (with Lana) vs. Rusev (with Summer Rae) ended in a double countout	Singles match	11:50
4	Neville and Stephen Amell defeated King Barrett and Stardust by pinfall	Tag team match	7:35
5	Ryback (c) defeated Big Show and The Miz by pinfall	Triple threat match for the WWE Intercontinental Championship	5:33
6	Dean Ambrose and Roman Reigns defeated The Wyatt Family (Bray Wyatt and Luke Harper) by pinfall	Tag team match	10:55
7	Seth Rollins (WWE) defeated John Cena (US) by pinfall	Winner Takes All match for the WWE World Heavyweight Championship and WWE United States Championship	19:44
8	Team PCB (Becky Lynch, Charlotte, and Paige) defeated Team B.A.D. (Naomi, Sasha Banks, and Tamina) and Team Bella (Alicia Fox, Brie Bella, and Nikki Bella) by pinfall	Three-team elimination match	15:20
9	Kevin Owens defeated Cesaro by pinfall	Singles match	14:18
10	The Undertaker defeated Brock Lesnar (with Paul Heyman) by technical submission	Singles match	17:10
(c) / – the champion(s) heading into the match

=== Elimination match ===
Eliminated	Team	Eliminated by	Method of elimination	Times
1	Team B.A.D.	Team Bella	Tamina was pinned by Brie Bella	6:17
2	Team Bella	Team PCB	Brie Bella was pinned by Becky Lynch	15:18
Winners	Team PCB	—N/a		15:18
