= Money in the Bank (2015) =

WWE pay-per-view and livestreaming event

- Promotional poster featuring Dean Ambrose
- Promotion: WWE
- Date: June 14, 2015
- City: Columbus, Ohio
- Venue: Nationwide Arena
- Attendance: 15,277
- Buy rate: 57,000 (excluding WWE Network views)

WWE event chronology
← Previous; Elimination Chamber	Next → The Beast in the East

Money in the Bank chronology
← Previous; 2014	Next → 2016

The 2015 Money in the Bank was a professional wrestling pay-per-view (PPV) and livestreaming event produced by WWE. It was the sixth annual Money in the Bank event and took place on June 14, 2015, at the Nationwide Arena in Columbus, Ohio. The event centered on the men's Money in the Bank ladder match, a multi-person ladder match where the wrestlers compete to retrieve a briefcase hanging above the ring which contains a contract for a guaranteed world championship match at any time within the next year.

Seven matches were contested at the event, including one on the Kickoff pre-show. In the main event, Seth Rollins retained the WWE World Heavyweight Championship in a ladder match against Dean Ambrose. On the undercard, Sheamus won the event's titular Money in the Bank ladder match for a WWE World Heavyweight Championship match contract. In other prominent matches, WWE United States Champion John Cena defeated NXT Champion Kevin Owens in a non-title match, and The Prime Time Players (Darren Young and Titus O'Neil) defeated The New Day (Big E and Xavier Woods) to win the WWE Tag Team Championship.

This was the first WWE pay-per-view event that was held in Columbus since Bad Blood in June 2004. Money in the Bank was available for free to new subscribers as part of a free-trial to WWE's streaming service, the WWE Network, in over 140 countries. The event had 57,000 pay-per-view buys (excluding WWE Network views), down from the previous year's 122,000 buys.

== Production ==
=== Background ===
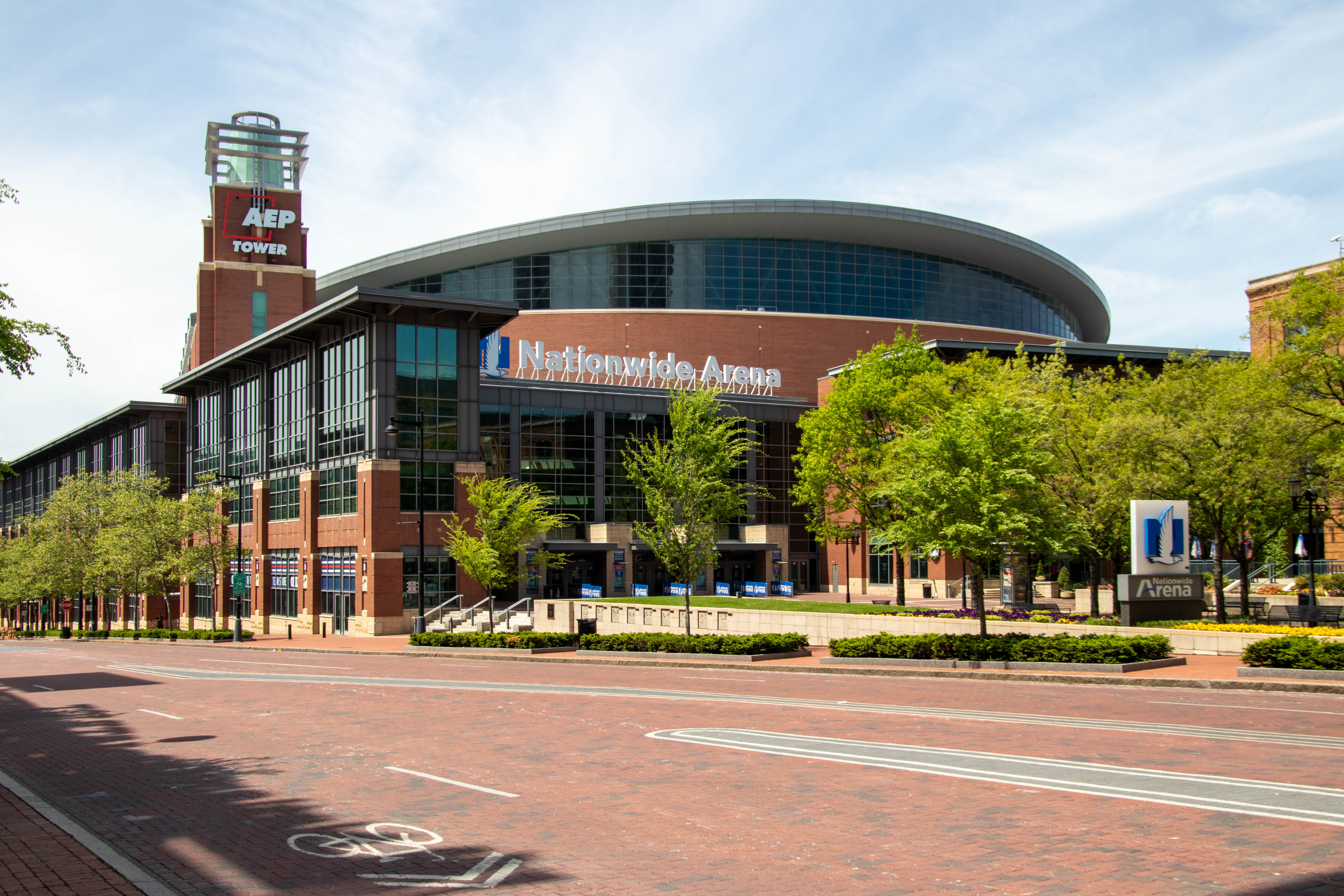
The sixth annual Money in the Bank event was held at the Nationwide Arena in Columbus, Ohio.

Money in the Bank is an annual professional wrestling event produced by WWE since 2010, originally held in July but moved up to June in 2014. It was originally broadcast exclusively via pay-per-view (PPV) before it began simultaneously livestreaming on the WWE Network in 2014. The concept of the event comes from WWE's established Money in the Bank ladder match, in which multiple wrestlers use ladders to retrieve a briefcase hanging above the ring. The briefcase contains a contract that guarantees the winner a match for a world championship at any time within the next year, with the 2015 match awarding a WWE World Heavyweight Championship match. The sixth Money in the Bank event took place on June 14, 2015, at the Nationwide Arena in Columbus, Ohio. This was the first WWE pay-per-view event that was held in Columbus since Bad Blood in June 2004. To promote the WWE Network, Money in the Bank was available for free to new subscribers in over 140 countries.

=== Storylines ===
The event comprised seven matches, including one on the Kickoff pre-show, that resulted from scripted storylines. Results were predetermined by WWE's writers, while storylines were produced on WWE's weekly television shows, Raw and SmackDown.

After Kevin Owens defeated John Cena at Elimination Chamber, a rematch was scheduled for Money in the Bank.

At Elimination Chamber, Dolph Ziggler, Neville, Roman Reigns, Randy Orton, Kofi Kingston, and Sheamus were revealed as the contestants in the Money in the Bank ladder match, in which the winner wins a contract for a WWE World Heavyweight Championship match at any time within the next year. On the June 4 episode of SmackDown, Kane was added to the match.

Also at Elimination Chamber, Dean Ambrose defeated WWE World Heavyweight Champion Seth Rollins by disqualification. Though Rollins remained champion, Ambrose took the title belt with him. On the June 1 episode of Raw, Roman Reigns, speaking on Ambrose's behalf, challenged Rollins to a ladder match for the title at Money in the Bank, which Rollins accepted.

On the June 4 episode of SmackDown, The Prime Time Players (Darren Young and Titus O'Neil) won a triple threat tag team match to become the #1 contenders to face The New Day (Big E, Xavier Woods, and Kofi Kingston) for the WWE Tag Team Championship at the event.

At Elimination Chamber, Ryback captured the vacant Intercontinental Championship in an Elimination Chamber match. On the June 1 episode of Raw, before Ryback was scheduled to defend the title against The Miz, Big Show attacked Miz and confronted Ryback. On June 8, Ryback was scheduled to defend the title against Big Show at the event.

On the June 1 episode of Raw, Nikki Bella retained the Divas Championship against Paige after Brie Bella switched with Nikki during the match and pinned Paige. On June 8, a rematch was scheduled for Money In The Bank.

At Elimination Chamber, R-Truth eliminated King Barrett during the Elimination Chamber match for the Intercontinental Championship. On the June 8 episode of Raw, a match between Truth and Barrett was set for the Money In The Bank preshow.

== Event ==
Other on-screen personnel
Role:	Name:
English commentators	Michael Cole
English commentators	Jerry Lawler
English commentators	John "Bradshaw" Layfield
Spanish commentators	Carlos Cabrera
Spanish commentators	Marcelo Rodriguez
Backstage interviewer	Renee Young
Ring announcers	Lilian Garcia
Ring announcers	JoJo
Referees	Charles Robinson
Referees	Mike Chioda
Referees	Jason Ayers
Referees	Darrick Moore
Referees	Rod Zapata
Pre-show panel	Renee Young
Pre-show panel	Booker T
Pre-show panel	Corey Graves
Pre-show panel	Byron Saxton

=== Pre-show ===
On the Money in the Bank Kickoff pre-show, R-Truth faced King Barrett. R-Truth pinned Barrett with a schoolboy to win the match.

=== Preliminary matches ===
The actual pay-per-view opened with the roster at the entrance stage for a 10-bell salute to Dusty Rhodes, who died before the event.

The first match was the Money in the Bank ladder match involving Roman Reigns, Sheamus, Randy Orton, Dolph Ziggler (with Lana), Neville, Kofi Kingston, and Kane. Near the climax of the match, it seemed that Reigns was going to claim the briefcase until Bray Wyatt emerged and attacked him, preventing him from retrieving the briefcase. The end of the match saw Sheamus throwing Neville off the ladder and retrieving the briefcase thus winning the match.

Next, Nikki Bella defended the WWE Divas Championship against Paige. Halfway through the match, Paige executed a "Ram-Paige" for a near-fall. As the referee was focusing on Paige, Nikki then switched places with her sister Brie (who was hiding under the ring). Paige secured a roll-up victory for the win and the championship. A surprised Paige thought that she had won until Brie revealed her face to the referee. The match was continued and Nikki executed a "Rack Attack" on Paige to score a pinfall.

In the third match, Ryback defended the WWE Intercontinental Championship against Big Show. The Miz was on commentary for the match. Near the end of the match, Show executed a "Knockout Punch" on Ryback, who rolled out the ring. As Show rolled Ryback in for the pin, Miz attacked Show, causing a disqualification.

After this, NXT Champion Kevin Owens wrestled WWE United States Champion John Cena. The match went back and forth with a lot of counters and finishers. Owens mocked Cena with his "you can't see me" gesture, but Cena responded with the same move. Owens executed a pop-up powerbomb for a two count while Cena responded with an "Attitude Adjustment" (AA) for a two count. Cena executed another "AA" for another two count. Cena eventually executed a third AA for the decisive pin. After the match, Owens powerbombed Cena on the ring apron and walked off.

In the penultimate match, The New Day (Big E and Xavier Woods) defended the WWE Tag Team Championship against The Prime Time Players (Titus O'Neil and Darren Young). O'Neil won the match for his team by pinning Woods after a "Clash of the Titus" to win the titles.

=== Main event ===
In the main event, Seth Rollins defended the WWE World Heavyweight Championship against Dean Ambrose in a ladder match. Ambrose executed "Dirty Deeds" on Rollins on the Spanish announce table. The climax saw both Ambrose and Rollins jostle atop the ladders for the championship. The championship was accidentally unhooked and as Rollins and Ambrose came crashing down, it was Rollins who held onto the title, thereby winning the match and retaining the title.

== Aftermath ==
After retaining the WWE World Heavyweight Championship, Seth Rollins celebrated on the following episode of Raw by renaming it "Monday Night Rollins", before being interrupted and attacked by Dean Ambrose, forcing Rollins to retreat. Ambrose then sat on a steel chair in the ring waiting for Rollins to return, but instead ended up facing Sheamus, whom he defeated thanks to a distraction by Randy Orton. Orton attacked Sheamus after the match, leading to a feud between the two, which headed into both Battleground and SummerSlam. Later that night, Triple H revealed that Seth Rollins' next challenger for the WWE World Heavyweight Championship at Battleground would be Brock Lesnar, who returned from his suspension and his rematch clause for the title was accepted by The Authority doing it on Rollins' behalf.

After feeling humiliated following his loss to John Cena, Kevin Owens challenged Cena to a match for the WWE United States Championship at Battleground, which Cena accepted on the June 22 episode of Raw.

Also on Raw, The Bella Twins (Nikki Bella and Brie Bella) defeated Paige in a 2-on-1 handicap match.

After the WWE Intercontinental Championship match that had ended on a disqualification, a triple threat match between Ryback, Big Show, and The Miz for the Intercontinental championship was scheduled for Battleground. However, Ryback had suffered a Staph Infection on his right knee, which caused the match to be cancelled. Ryback would later recover and the match was rescheduled for SummerSlam.

Sheamus twice tried to cash-in his Money in the Bank contract on Seth Rollins for a WWE World Heavyweight Championship match but his attempts were denied, first by Randy Orton as payback for costing him a title match by disqualification against Rollins on August 10 episode of Raw and the second by Kane after Rollins retained his title at Night of Champions. However, Rollins vacated the title on November 4, after suffering multiple knee injuries at a live event in Dublin, Ireland. Sheamus would eventually cash-in his contract on Roman Reigns after the latter won the vacant WWE World Heavyweight Championship at Survivor Series and pinned him to win the title.

This was the last Money in the Bank event to feature the Divas Championship as it was retired and replaced by a new WWE Women's Championship during the WrestleMania 32 pre-show in April 2016.

== Results ==
No.	Results	Stipulations	Times
1^{P}	R-Truth defeated King Barrett by pinfall	Singles match	5:40
2	Sheamus defeated Dolph Ziggler, Kane, Kofi Kingston, Neville, Randy Orton, and Roman Reigns	Money in the Bank ladder match for a WWE World Heavyweight Championship match contract	21:50
3	Nikki Bella (c) defeated Paige by pinfall	Singles match for the WWE Divas Championship	12:14
4	Big Show defeated Ryback (c) by disqualification	Singles match for the WWE Intercontinental Championship	5:25
5	WWE United States Champion John Cena defeated NXT Champion Kevin Owens by pinfall	Champion vs. Champion match	19:15
6	The Prime Time Players (Darren Young and Titus O'Neil) defeated The New Day (Big E and Xavier Woods) (c) by pinfall	Tag team match for the WWE Tag Team Championship	5:48
7	Seth Rollins (c) defeated Dean Ambrose	Ladder match for the WWE World Heavyweight Championship	35:40
(c) / – the champion(s) heading into the match; P / – the match was broadcast on the pre-show
