= The Prime Time Players =

Professional wrestling tag team

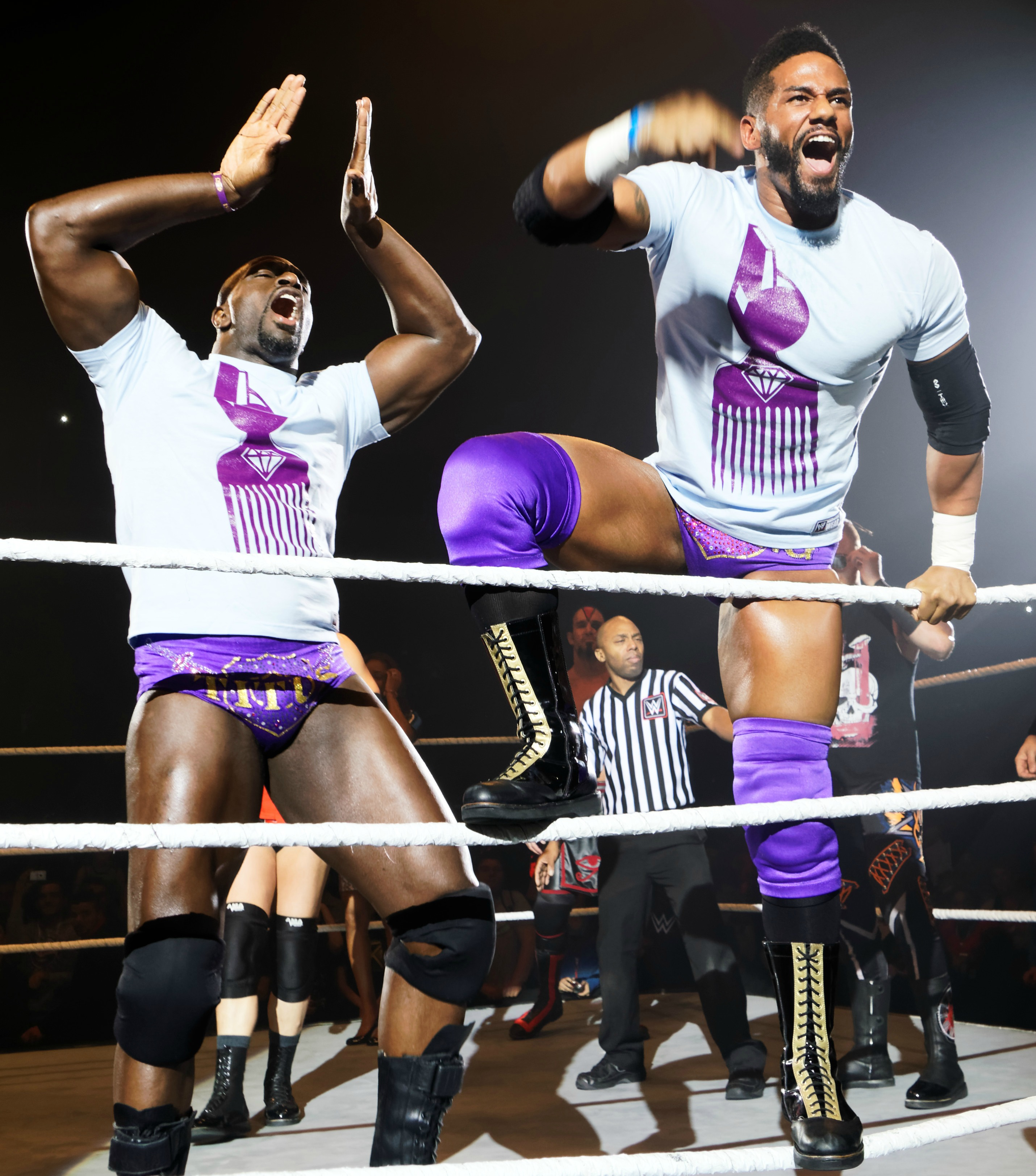
- O'Neil (left) and Young (right) in 2015

Statistics
- Name: The Prime Time Players
- Members: Darren Young; Titus O'Neil; A.W. (manager)
- Billed heights: Young: 6 ft 1 in (1.85 m); O'Neil: 6 ft 4 in (1.93 m)
- Combined billed weight: 509 lb (231 kg)
- Hometown: Florida
- Debut: January 25, 2012
- Disbanded: August 15, 2016
- Years active: 2012–2014; 2015–2016

The Prime Time Players were an American professional wrestling tag team performing in the WWE, composed of Darren Young and Titus O'Neil. The two initially competed on WWE NXT, debuting as a team in January 2012 and were later promoted to the main roster in April of that year.

After disbanding and a brief feud in 2014, The Prime Times Players reunited in February 2015 and subsequently captured the WWE Tag Team Championship from The New Day, at Money in the Bank before splitting once again in February 2016 and subsequently starting a feud between the two again.

== History ==
=== Formation (2012) ===
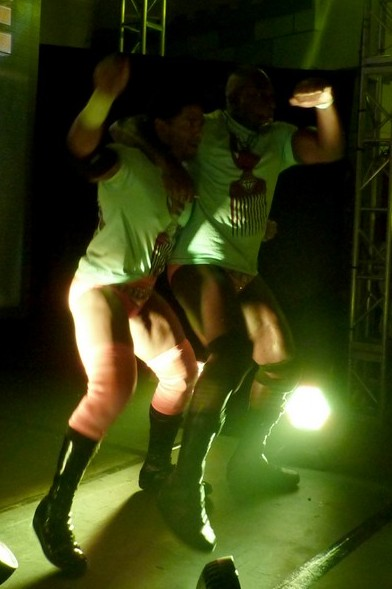
The Prime Time Players in November 2013

Initially, O'Neil (who was then a face) and Young were rivals on WWE NXT during its fifth season, named NXT Redemption. Early on, O'Neil was paired with then-friend Percy Watson against Young and his NXT pro, Chavo Guerrero. The feud was put on hold when Guerrero was released and Young was suspended. On the November 16, 2011, episode of NXT, O'Neil was assaulted by a returning Young. Young was then able to get the better of O'Neil twice in tag team matches. The conclusion to O'Neil's feud with Young came when O'Neil defeated Young in a no disqualification match on the January 18 episode of NXT. O'Neil then turned heel after the match, verbally ripping on the audience, his former pro Hornswoggle, and NXT itself.

O'Neil urged Watson to also turn his back on the fans on the January 25, 2012, episode of NXT Redemption. When Watson refused, O'Neil shoved him and a match between the two was booked, leading to O'Neil defeating Watson. O'Neil continued to attack Watson after the match, leading to Alex Riley saving Watson. O'Neil then formed an alliance with former enemy Young, and the duo teamed up to defeat Watson and Riley on the February 1 and February 29 episodes of NXT Redemption. O'Neil also faced and defeated Riley on the February 22 episode. On the March 7 episode, Watson received his rematch against O'Neil and defeated O'Neil. O'Neil and Young then moved on to feud with The Usos.

=== WWE Tag Team Championship pursuits and split (2012–2014) ===
On the April 18 episode of NXT Redemption, it was announced that O'Neil and Young had been moved to the main roster. The team made their debut for the SmackDown brand on the April 20 episode of SmackDown with a victory over The Usos. They started on a winning streak defeating the likes Ezekiel Jackson and Yoshi Tatsu and Santino Marella and Zack Ryder. However, on the May 18 edition of SmackDown, their winning streak ended when they were defeated by the Tag Team Champions Kofi Kingston and R-Truth. On the June 1 edition of SmackDown, O'Neil and Young named themselves the Prime Time Players. At No Way Out, they won a Fatal-four-Way tag team match to become the number one contenders for the WWE Tag Team Championship following assistance from A. W. who had turned on his clients, Primo and Epico in favor of the Prime Time Players, prompting a feud between the two tag teams. On the July 16 episode of Raw, the Prime Time Players unsuccessfully challenged Kofi Kingston and R-Truth for the WWE Tag Team Championship.

O'Neil and Young bounced back with two singles victories over Kingston and R-Truth. On the August 10 episode of SmackDown, they defeated Primo and Epico in a number one contenders match via disqualification when A. W. provoked Kofi and R-Truth (who were doing guest commentary) into interfering in the match. That same day, A. W. was released from his contract. On the August 13 edition of Raw, it was announced that the Prime Time Players would receive their championship match at SummerSlam. That same night, after R-Truth defeated Heath Slater, O'Neil and Young ambushed R-Truth and left him laying in the ring (Kingston was away on an international tour). At SummerSlam, O'Neil & Young were defeated by Kingston and R-Truth. On the September 7 edition of SmackDown, O'Neil and Young defeated Primo and Epico and The Usos in a triple threat tag match to once again become the number one contenders to the Tag Team Championship. The following week of Raw, they were defeated by Daniel Bryan and Kane, who became the new number one contenders. At Survivor Series, the Prime Time Players took part in a losing effort in a ten-man elimination tag team match.

In an interview released on August 15, 2013, Young revealed his homosexual orientation in real-life. On the August 19 episode of Raw, the Prime Time Players started to wrestle as faces, due to management's and the fans' support for Darren Young coming out. At the pre-show of Night of Champions, the Prime Time Players won a "Tag Team Turmoil" match and thus a title shot by last eliminating the Real Americans (Antonio Cesaro and Jack Swagger). Later that night, they lost to defending champions Seth Rollins and Roman Reigns of the Shield. After their face turn they did several comedy segments backstage including selling merchandise and a hotdog eating contest.

On the January 31, 2014, episode of SmackDown after Young was pinned in a tag team match against Ryback and Curtis Axel, O'Neil viciously attacked him after the match, turning heel and officially disbanding the team. They would have a match at Elimination Chamber, with O'Neil getting the victory. A rematch took place on the February 26 episode of Main Event, which was won by Young. In April, Young underwent surgery to repair a torn ACL in his left knee that would take him out of action for several months. Meanwhile, O'Neil formed a dysfunctional tag team with Heath Slater, known as Slater-Gator (a reference to O'Neil being a Florida Gator), to little success.

=== Reunion and WWE Tag Team Champions (2015–2016) ===
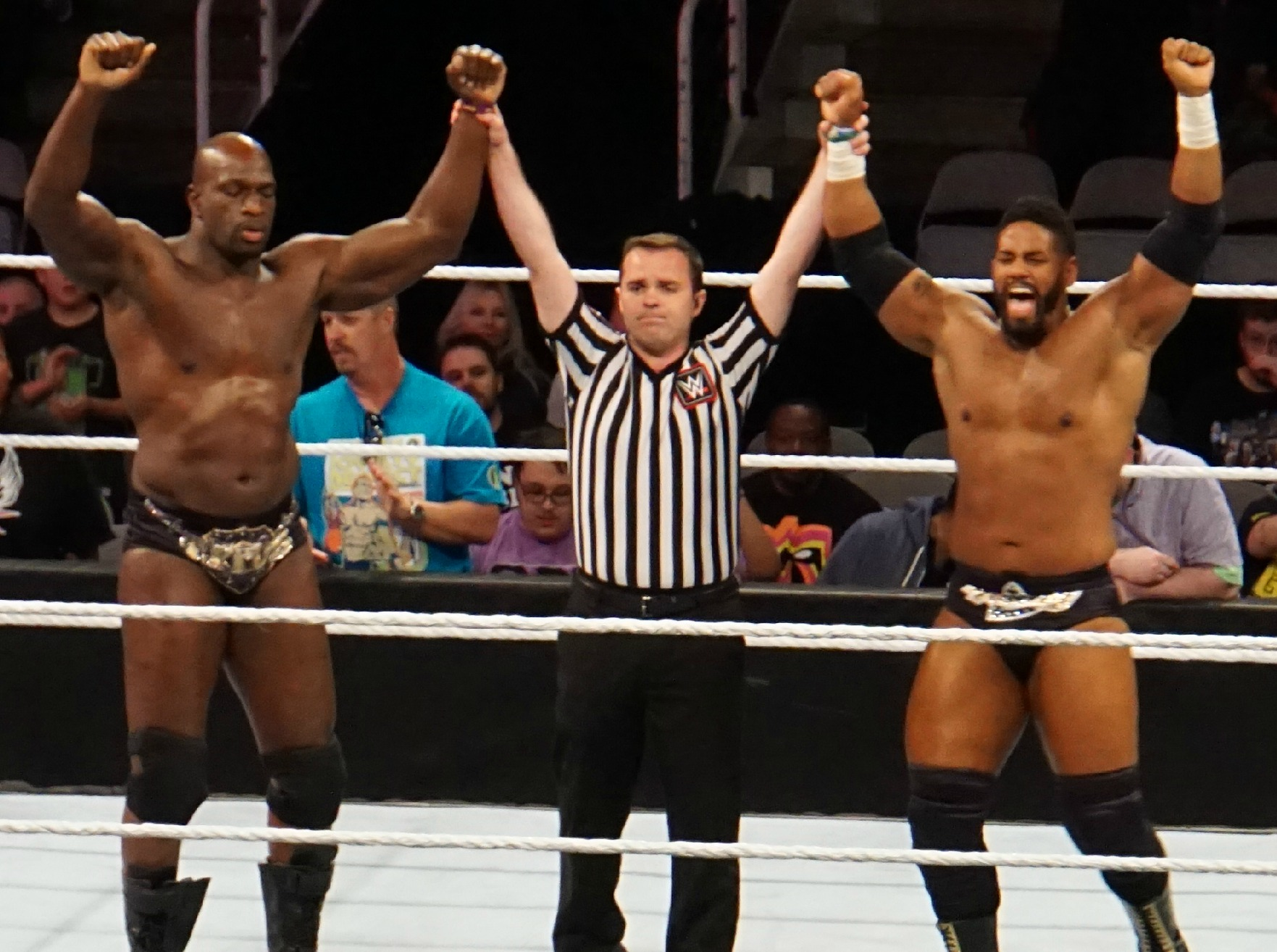
O'Neil and Young in March 2015

On February 16 episode of Raw, O'Neil made a save for Young who, along with independent wrestler Kevin Kross (who would later return to WWE under the ring name "Karrion Kross" in 2020), was being attacked by The Ascension. This signified a reunion of the team and face turn for O'Neil. On the February 23 episode of Raw, they officially reunited and gave The Ascension their first loss in the WWE. They once again defeated The Ascension on March 14 episode of Main Event. They then participated in the André the Giant Memorial Trophy Battle Royal at WrestleMania 31, which was won by Big Show. After WrestleMania, they began performing comedic skits that poked fun at other tag teams including The New Day, The Ascension, Los Matadores and Tyson Kidd and Cesaro. They became one of the five teams to challenge the New Day for the Tag Titles at Elimination Chamber, and eliminated The Ascension and Tyson Kidd and Cesaro, but lost after all of The New Day pinned Titus O'Neil.

The following week on SmackDown, they won a triple threat tag team match against the Lucha Dragons and The Ascension, to become the number one contenders for the tag team championship against The New Day at Money in the Bank. At Money in the Bank, the Prime Time Players defeated The New Day to capture the WWE Tag Team Championship, their first ever titles in WWE. At Battleground, the Prime Time Players successfully retained their titles against The New Day. At SummerSlam, The New Day defeated The Prime Time Players in a Fatal-4-Way tag team match to become the new WWE Tag Team Champions. On the September 7 episode of Raw, it was announced that The New Day would defend the titles against The Prime Time Players in a rematch the following week, and the winners would defend the titles against The Dudley Boyz at Night of Champions. On the September 14 episode of Raw, The New Day defeated The Prime Time Players, thus setting up The New Day vs. The Dudley Boyz for Night of Champions.

Towards the end of 2015, O'Neil and Young began focusing on singles careers. On the November 9 episode of Raw, O'Neil competed in the first round of the WWE World Heavyweight Championship tournament against Kevin Owens, in a losing effort. At the Survivor Series pre-show, O'Neil teamed with a returning Goldust, Dudley Boyz and Neville against The Cosmic Wasteland, The Miz and Bo Dallas, in a five-on-five traditional Survivor Series elimination tag team match, in a winning effort. O'Neil and Young appeared as a team on January 15, 2016, at a house show on WWE's India tour. Young teamed with Damien Sandow on the Royal Rumble 2016 Kickoff Show in a Fatal 4-Way tag team qualifying match, while O'Neil competed in the Royal Rumble match itself. On the February 2, 2016, taping of Main Event, the duo returned to team with The Usos, to defeat The Ascension, Stardust and Tyler Breeze. They then quietly disbanded when O'Neil received a 60-day suspension after the February 8 episode of Raw after an alleged physical altercation with Vince McMahon. After O'Neil's suspension, both Young and O'Neil returned to singles competition. O'Neil began a feud with Rusev for the WWE United States Championship while Young started a storyline with Bob Backlund, challenging The Miz for the WWE Intercontinental Championship.

=== Second feud (2016) ===
When the WWE Draft returned in July 2016, both of them were drafted to the Raw brand. On the August 1 episode of Raw, O'Neil started a slow heel turn when he questioned Young's motives on being "great again". Later that night, he defeated Young when he pinned him while grabbing Young's tights. Afterwards, he got into a backstage altercation with Bob Backlund before Young came to the defense of Backlund by attacking O'Neil. The week after on Raw, Young defeated O'Neil via pinfall by grabbing O'Neil's tights, mimicking the way O'Neil defeated him. On the August 15 episode of Raw, Young and O'Neil reconciled and were placed in an ad hoc tag team match against The Shining Stars. During the match, O'Neil attacked Young, officially turning heel in the process for the first time since 2015.

On October 29, 2017, Darren Young was released from his WWE contract thus ending any possibilities of a reunion.

== Reception ==
Former WWE wrestler Shad Gaspard has accused the team of basing their gimmick off his former team Cryme Tyme, albeit without the "gangster style" and bling-bling fashion.

== Championships and accomplishments ==
- Pro Wrestling Illustrated
  - PWI ranked O'Neil No. 82 of the top 500 singles wrestlers in the PWI 500 in 2013
  - PWI ranked Young No. 89 of the top 500 singles wrestlers in the PWI 500 in 2013
  - Inspirational Wrestler of the Year (2013) – Young
- Rolling Stone
  - Most Deserved Push (2015)
- WWE
  - WWE Tag Team Championship (1 time)

=== Other awards and honors ===
- MEGA Dad Awards
  - MEGA Celebrity Dad of the Year (2015) – O'Neil
