= Abraham Washington =

American professional wrestler

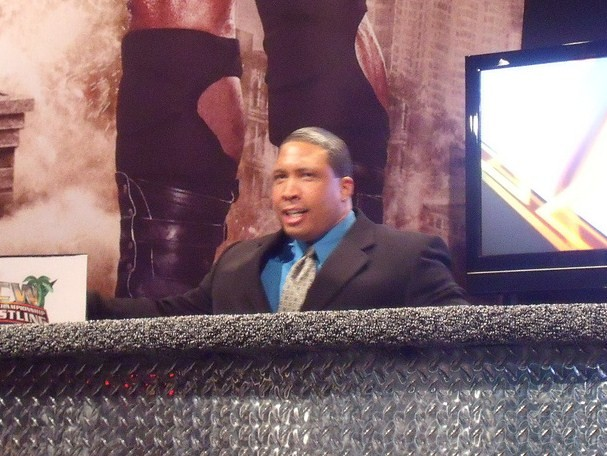
- Washington in 2010

Personal information
- Born: Brian Bary Jossie; February 2, 1978 (age 48) Texas, U.S.

Professional wrestling career
- Ring name(s): A. W. Abraham Obama Washington; Abraham Saddam Washington; Abraham Washington; Brian Jossie; G.O.A.T. Jeremiah Constantine; Trap Ghoul; Vice Vicar
- Billed height: 6 ft 2 in (1.88 m)
- Billed weight: 220 lb (100 kg)
- Billed from: Washington, D.C.
- Debut: January 2008
- Retired: 2019

Brian Bary Jossie (born February 2, 1978), better known by his ring name Abraham Washington (abbreviated A. W.), is an American professional wrestler and former wrestling manager. He is best known for his time in WWE.

== Professional wrestling career ==
=== World Wrestling Entertainment / WWE ===
==== Florida Championship Wrestling (2009–2012) ====
Jossie signed a WWE developmental contract, and began working in their developmental territory Florida Championship Wrestling (FCW). In February 2009, he made his FCW debut working under real name, Brian Jossie with no real personality or character. However, he was soon repackaged with a presidential gimmick, and pacted as the FCW General Manager, first under the name Abraham Saddam Washington, before switching to the name Abraham Obama Washington. In March 2010, Washington returned to FCW, with his show, The Abraham Washington Show, and also became an occasional color commentator. On the November 14, 2010, episode of FCW TV Jossie made his in–ring return, wrestling his first match in one and a half years and continued to compete regularly, with FCW.

==== ECW (2009–2010) ====
Jossie made his ECW debut on June 30, 2009, using the ring name Abraham Washington, with an in-ring interview segment called The Abraham Washington Show. He interviewed The Bella Twins, causing a fight between the two after they argued over the questions. He went on to interview the likes of Christian, Matt Hardy, Tommy Dreamer, Sheamus, Gregory Helms, John Morrison, Zack Ryder, Goldust, Trent Barreta, Caylen Croft, Yoshi Tatsu and Maria. Hall of Famer Tony Atlas acted as his sidekick and announcer, with the segment taking place from the stage. After the ECW program was cancelled, Jossie became a free agent along with all the other ECW talents, though he never signed with Raw or SmackDown. He did return to FCW, where he had matches throughout 2011.

==== All World Promotions and departure (2012) ====
Jossie returned to WWE television in April 2012. On the April 2 episode of Raw, he offered to manage Mark Henry and gave him a business card for his talent agency "All World Promotions". He was also seen on the April 16 episode of Raw, scouting Primo and Epico from the stage. On May 3, it was announced on WWE.com that A. W. had signed Primo & Epico, as well as their valet Rosa Mendes as his first clients. However, a month later at No Way Out, Washington turned on his original clients and joined the team of Darren Young and Titus O'Neil. Jossie made his final WWE appearance on the August 10, 2012 edition of SmackDown as a couple hours later, he was released from his WWE contract, 11 days after making a highly controversial on-air remark. Jossie claimed his release was not due to this comment, but because he posted a tweet in support of Linda McMahon's senate campaign. According to Jossie, Linda wished to distance herself from WWE, and so wrestlers were not allowed to reference her.

=== Independent circuit (2016–2019) ===
On August 6, Jossie made his debut for the Coastal Championship Wrestling promotion under the new ring name G.O.A.T. (Greatest Of All Time). At the event, G.O.A.T. successfully challenged and defeated Stefan Guadalupe to win the CCW Heavyweight Championship.

== Kobe Bryant joke controversy ==
During the live broadcast of Monday Night Raw on July 30, 2012, Jossie made a joke referencing NBA player Kobe Bryant's 2003 sexual assault case. As client Titus O'Neil tangled with Kofi Kingston in a singles match, Jossie, who was wearing a headset microphone yelled from ringside, "Titus O'Neil is like Kobe Bryant at a hotel in Colorado - HE'S UNSTOPPABLE!". When Raw returned from commercial break following the match, the WWE apologized on-air through announcer Michael Cole and Jossie later issued an apology that evening via Twitter and noted that "there was no malicious intent behind the joke". After Raw, WWE issued an official apology via TMZ reading, "A. W. made an inappropriate comment and WWE immediately apologized. WWE has taken appropriate action in the matter". The representative, however, did not specify what "action" was taken against Jossie. The incident would later be a subject for discussion on the August 1, 2012 broadcast of ESPN's Around the Horn with ESPN analyst and Miami Herald columnist Israel Gutierrez using his "facetime" (for winning the day's show) to criticize the WWE for the incident, despite Jossie's joke being an off-the-cuff moment. Jossie was released by WWE on August 10. After his release from WWE, he went on a rant on his WWE verified Twitter account, @AWPromotions, about his former employer. Eventually, WWE suspended his account indefinitely.

== Championships and accomplishments ==
- Coastal Championship Wrestling
  - CCW Heavyweight Championship (1 time)
- Pro Wrestling Illustrated
  - PWI ranked him No. 474 of the top 500 wrestlers in the PWI 500 in 2011
