= The Ascension (professional wrestling) =

Professional wrestling tag team

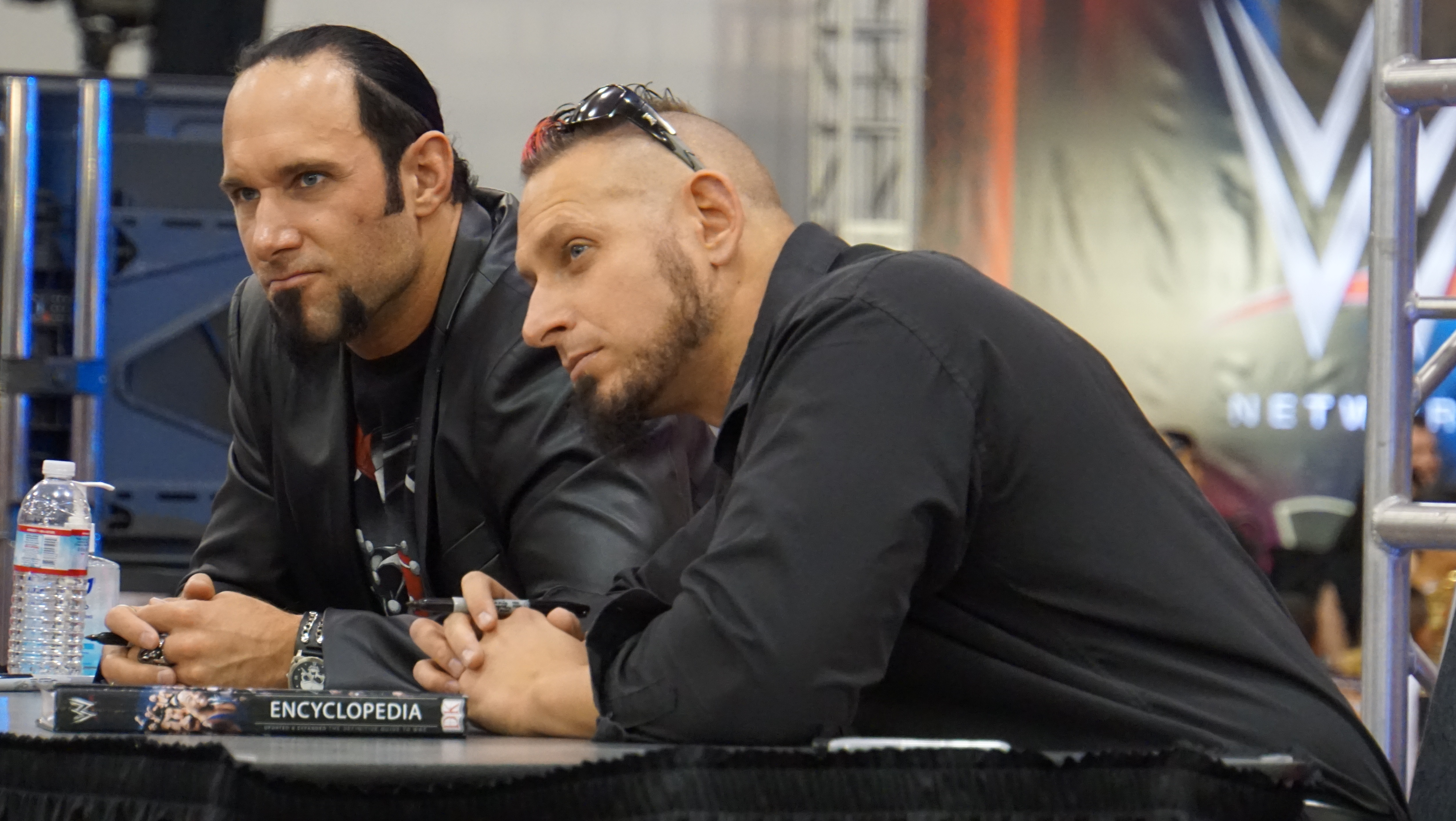
- Viktor (left) and Konnor (right)

Tag team
- Name(s): The Ascension; The Awakening
- Members: Conor O'Brian/Konnor/Big Kon; Rick Victor/Viktor/Vik; Kenneth Cameron; Tito Colon
- Manager(s): Raquel Diaz; Ricardo Rodriguez
- Billed heights: Konnor: 6 ft 5 in (1.96 m); Viktor: 6 ft 2 in (1.88 m)
- Combined billed weight: 487 lb (221 kg)
- Billed from: The Wasteland
- Debut: August 28, 2011
- Years active: 2011–2012; 2013–2022

The Ascension were a professional wrestling tag team consisting of Konnor and Viktor. They are best known for their tenure in WWE.

The Ascension was formerly a stable from 2011 to 2012. The Ascension originally started out in Florida Championship Wrestling as a stable consisting of Conor O'Brian, Kenneth Cameron, Ricardo Rodriguez, Tito Colon and Raquel Diaz. After several membership changes, Conor O'Brian and Rick Victor (their respective ring names were also shortened to Konnor and Viktor), then became established as a tag-team in NXT. Their 364-day NXT Tag Team Championship reign is currently the longest in the history of the title. In December 2019, the duo were released from WWE after months of inactivity.

== History ==
=== WWE (2011–2019) ===
==== First incarnation (2011–2012) ====
At Florida Championship Wrestling's August 28, 2011 event, Ricardo Rodriguez announced the formation of a stable called The Ascension, with members including Kenneth Cameron, Conor O'Brian, Tito Colon, and Raquel Diaz. The first match to include all members in some capacity came on September 1, 2011, and saw Cameron, Colon and O’Brian, accompanied by Diaz, defeating CJ Parker, Donny Marlow, and Johnny Curtis. On September 30, Cameron and Colon had a shot at the Florida Tag Team Championship but lost to then champions CJ Parker and Donny Marlow.

In October, The Ascension was no longer associated with Rodriguez, as video packages promoting The Ascension with new darker characters only featured the other four Ascension members without Rodriguez. By the end of November, The Ascension had all but disbanded, as O'Brian fell to injury and Colon was called up to WWE main roster to team with his cousin Primo, meanwhile Diaz became Queen of FCW and distanced herself from the stable. This left Cameron as the sole survivor of The Ascension and he continued to use The Ascension gimmick during his appearances. However the disintegration of the group would prove to be beneficial for Cameron as he would go on a three-month singles winning streak, beating the likes of Jiro and Calvin Raines until he finally lost to Colin Cassady on February 23, 2012.

On March 15, 2012 Cameron was accompanied to the ring by the returning Conor O'Brian in his match against Byron Saxton, the match ended in disqualification when O'Brian interfered. Cameron and O'Brian began wrestling as a tag team using the name of The Ascension, with their first tag team match together coming on March 23 when the two defeated Jason Jordan and Xavier Woods. The Ascension suffered their first loss when the pair lost to the Florida Tag Team Champions Corey Graves and Jake Carter in a title bout. After this loss, the Ascension would go on another winning streak including winning a fatal four-way elimination against the teams of Adam Mercer and Chad Baxter, Jason Jordan and Mike Dalton, and Brad Maddox and Rick Victor.

On June 20, 2012, The Ascension made their debut on NXT, defeating CJ Parker and Mike Dalton with their double team finisher, Downcast. They would later enter a rivalry with The Usos, with the Ascension getting the better end of most of the encounters between the two teams. The Ascension also defeated another main roster team in Justin Gabriel and Tyson Kidd on the October 3, 2012 episode of NXT. However, the team was disbanded after Cameron was released from his WWE contract on November 30, 2012 after being arrested.

==== NXT Tag Team division dominance (2013–2014) ====
From there O'Brian worked as a singles wrestler, keeping the Ascension gimmick on his own for some time. Following O'Brian's victory over Briley Pierce and Sakamoto on the May 15, 2013 edition of NXT, Rick Victor appeared on the ramp, getting O'Brian's attention. Victor would officially accompany O'Brian to the ring as his partner in the Ascension on the July 3 edition of NXT as O'Brian defeated Andy Baker. After winning a gauntlet match to determine the number one contenders for the NXT Tag Team Championship, the Ascension defeated the team of Adrian Neville and Corey Graves on the October 2 edition of NXT to capture the titles. On November 8 the two were renamed, Conor O'Brian renamed to Konnor and Rick Victor renamed to Viktor.

For the majority of their title reign, The Ascension would battle and dismantle local wrestlers in mere minutes with very little to no offense from their opponents. Their first major title defense was against Too Cool (Grandmaster Sexay and Scotty 2 Hotty) at NXT's first live special, NXT Arrival, where they emerged victorious. The Ascension began demanding competition in the weeks following, moving up from local wrestlers to various combinations of teams made up from contracted NXT wrestlers. While still disabling and annihilating their opponents week after week, they were confronted by a team of masked wrestlers; El Local and Kalisto, who challenged them for their tag team titles at the second live event, NXT TakeOver. Though they were given their toughest challenge to date, The Ascension successfully defended their gold after hitting Fall of Man on Local.

The Ascension had a cameo on the main roster on the September 9, 2014 episode of Main Event to promote their upcoming title defense, defeating Los Matadores (Diego and Fernando) in a match to promote their title defense against The Lucha Dragons (Kalisto and Sin Cara) at the NXT TakeOver: Fatal 4-Way event. At the event, The Ascension lost the titles to Kalisto and Sin Cara, ending their reign a day short of a full year at 364 days. That same night, they were in an altercation with William Regal and the debuting Hideo Itami. After feuding with and assaulting Itami for several weeks, a second international wrestler, Finn Bálor, joined Itami in his fight against both Konnor and Viktor. This led to a match on December 11 at NXT TakeOver: R Evolution, where The Ascension were defeated by Bálor and Itami.

==== Beginnings on the main roster (2014–2016) ====
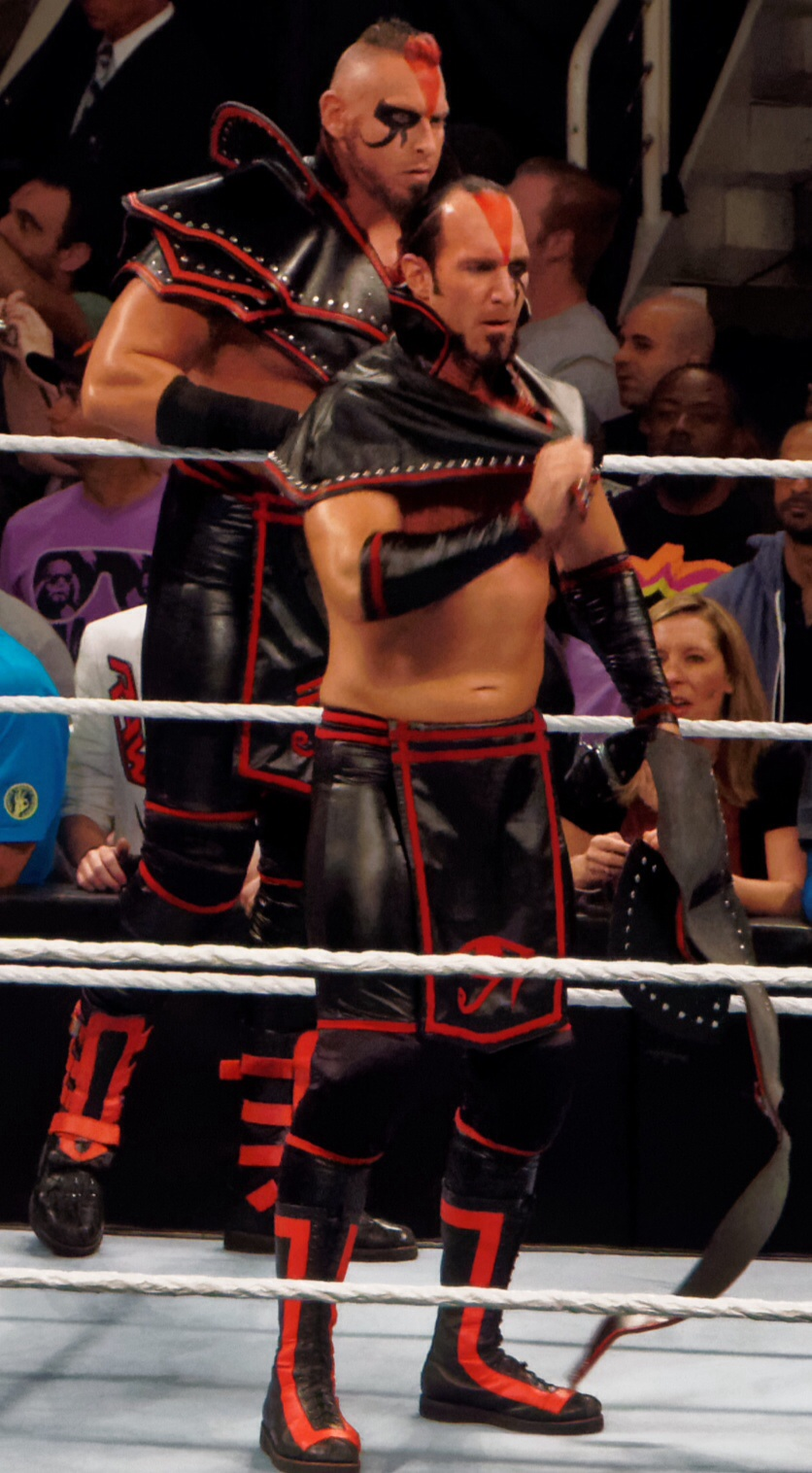
On the main roster, The Ascension changed their look, similar to The Road Warriors.

The following night on SmackDown, vignettes began to air promoting The Ascension's call-up to the main roster. They were promoted to the main roster on the December 29, 2014 episode of Raw, defeating The Miz and Damien Mizdow. On the January 2 and 9 episodes of SmackDown and the January 5 episode of Raw, The Ascension easily defeated local preliminary wrestlers in less than a minute, and also cementing their heel status after comparing themselves to prominent tag teams of the past including The Powers of Pain, The Road Warriors and Demolition.

By the second week of their main roster run, Mike Tedesco of wrestleview.com lambasted how WWE had made the Ascension lose all credibility for two reasons: firstly, they openly admitted being "a rip off of The Road Warriors and Demolition", and secondly, all the commentators (including JBL, who was a heel commentator) disparaged the Ascension as "nothing compared" to the older teams they were copying. On the January 19 episode of Raw, the Ascension confronted the reuniting New World Order members Kevin Nash, Scott Hall and X-Pac. However, the Ascension were then interrupted, attacked by and laid out by two other past-generation teams: the Acolytes Protection Agency and the New Age Outlaws. At this point, various critics were labeling the writing for the Ascension's main roster storylines to be that "it seemed WWE gave up on [the Ascension] in week two of their main roster run", with WWE making "a mockery of the push every single week" with "criminal booking". The storyline culminated in the Ascension defeating the New Age Outlaws at the Royal Rumble pay-per-view.

"The Ascension were amazing in NXT then the WWE dropped the ball when they moved them up to the main roster. I have sympathy for Konnor, Viktor. They toiled so hard over the years in NXT and then the main roster management just ruins everything they have worked so hard for. A crying shame to be sure."

— John Powell of SLAM! Wrestling, in naming the Ascension as 2015's worst tag team in wrestling

On the February 12, 2015 episode of SmackDown, the Ascension's main roster winning streak (since their call up) ended in a tag team turmoil (gauntlet) match; they entered against Daniel Bryan and Roman Reigns and were eliminated via disqualification. On the February 23 episode of Raw, the Ascension suffered their first pinfall loss on the main roster, courtesy of the Prime Time Players. Although they defeated The Prime Time Players in a rematch on the next week's episode of Superstars, the Ascension's fortunes then vastly declined; between early March to the end of July 2015, they appeared regularly on Main Event and Superstars, and started a losing streak. At WrestleMania 31, Konnor and Viktor made their WrestleMania debuts in the André the Giant memorial battle royal, with neither of the duo winning the match. In May, The Ascension started a feud against The Meta Powers and defeated them at Payback pre-show. At Elimination Chamber on May 31, they participated in an Elimination Chamber match for the tag titles, they eliminated Los Matadores and the Lucha Dragons until they were eliminated by The Prime Time Players.

On the September 3 episode of SmackDown, The Ascension attacked Neville as he was making his way to the ring against Stardust, aligning themselves with Stardust in the process and thus forming a group known as "The Cosmic Wasteland", where in Stardust calls The Ascension his "henchmen". At Night of Champions, Stardust and The Ascension defeated Neville and The Lucha Dragons in a six-man tag team match in the pre-show, but were subsequently defeated in two rematches. On the Survivor Series kickoff, The Cosmic Wasteland, The Miz, and Bo Dallas were defeated by The Dudley Boyz, Neville, Goldust and Titus O'Neil in a Five-on-five traditional Survivor Series elimination tag team match. In May 2016, The Cosmic Wasteland stable disbanded after Stardust left the company. At WrestleMania 32, Konnor and Viktor entered the Andre The Giant Memorial Battle Royal, both with failing efforts. On April 16, 2016, WWE suspended Konnor for 60 days for a second violation of the Talent Wellness policy. Following the suspension, Viktor began competing in singles competition, mainly on Superstars and Main Event. Konnor made his return during the June 20 WWE Superstars taping, teaming with Viktor to face The Golden Truth (Goldust and R-Truth).

==== Brand switches and departure (2016–2019) ====
On July 19 at the 2016 WWE draft, The Ascension were drafted to SmackDown brand in the eighth round. On July 26 episode of SmackDown Live, both members competed in a WWE World Championship #1 contendership six-pack qualifying battle royal, which was won by Apollo Crews. At SummerSlam, The Ascension competed in a 12-man tag team match, where their team lost. They then entered the SmackDown Tag Team Championship tournament where they were eliminated in the first round by The Usos. On the TLC: Tables, Ladders & Chairs pre-show, The Ascension, The Vaudevillains and Curt Hawkins lost a ten-man tag team match against Apollo Crews, American Alpha and The Hype Bros. At the 2017 Elimination Chamber pay-per-view, they fought in a tag team turmoil match for the SmackDown Tag Team Championship, but were the last team to be eliminated, losing to the reigning champions American Alpha. At WrestleMania 33, they once again entered the André the Giant Memorial Battle Royal, but neither were successful. At Money in the Bank, The Ascension lost to Breezango (Tyler Breeze and Fandango) after they claimed responsibility for a vandal attack in their office. On the June 27 episode of SmackDown Live, The Ascension was interrogated by Breezango on "Fashion Vice", admitting that they didn't commit the crime and only took responsibility, because they wanted a match at the PPV. In September, the duo turned face when they started trying to befriend Breezango during the latter's 'Fashion Files' segments. On the January 9, 2018 episode of SmackDown Live, The Ascension suffered a loss to The Bludgeon Brothers, for a while the duo would only appear as supporting characters in Breezango's Fashion Files skits. At Wrestlemania 34, the duo were participants in the 5th annual André the Giant memorial battle royal, with Konnor being the first of the duo to be eliminated followed minutes later by Viktor.

On April 16, The Ascension were traded to Raw brand as part of Superstar Shake-up. On the April 23 episode of Raw, The Ascension, once again as heels, faced the team of Matt Hardy and Bray Wyatt in a losing effort. The two were participants in the Greatest Royal Rumble match, with Viktor being eliminated by Daniel Bryan, and Konnor being eliminated by Elias and The New Day (Kofi Kingston and Xavier Woods). On the April 12, 2019 episode of Main Event, The Ascension lost to Heavy Machinery (Otis and Tucker), in what would be their final match in WWE. On December 8, 2019, after eight months of inactivity, The Ascension were released from their WWE contracts ending their nine-year tenure with the company.

=== Independent circuit (2020–2022) ===
Following their departure from WWE, Konnor (under the ring name Big Kon) and Viktor (under the ring name of Vik) were announced for Wrestling Revolver's Pancakes and Piledrivers event during WrestleMania 36 weekend. On February 20, 2020, The Ascension competed in their first match since leaving WWE at Outlaw Wrestling defeating Bull James and Bill Carr. On February 22, 2020, The Ascension teamed with DMT and defeated Bull James, Corey Cooper, Jaden Valo & Sal Salvelli at NYWC Psycho Circus 18. In June 2020, Big Kon and Vik revealed their new tag team name to be The Awakening. In March 2021, The Awakening won the Atomic Wrestling Tag Team championship.

== Other media ==
The Ascension, consisting of the duo of Konnor and Viktor, made their video game debut as a part of the NXT Arrival DLC pack (Downloadable Content) in WWE 2K15. They are also part of WWE 2K16, WWE 2K17, WWE 2K18 and WWE 2K19 also as a duo.

== Championships and accomplishments ==
- Atomic Revolutionary Wrestling
  - ARW Tag Team Championship (1 time) – Big Kon and Vik
- Pro Wrestling Illustrated
  - PWI ranked Konnor #123 of the top 500 singles wrestlers in the PWI 500 in 2014
  - PWI ranked Viktor #128 of the top 500 singles wrestlers in the PWI 500 in 2014
- Universal Championship Wrestling
  - UCW Unified Atlantic Tag Team Championship (1 time) – Big Kon and Vik
- WWE
  - NXT Tag Team Championship (1 time) – Konnor and Viktor
