= Elimination Chamber (2015) =

WWE pay-per-view and livestreaming event

- Promotional poster featuring Ryback and the Elimination Chamber structure
- Promotion: WWE
- Date: May 31, 2015
- City: Corpus Christi, Texas
- Venue: American Bank Center
- Attendance: 7,000
- Buy rate: 41,000 (excluding WWE Network views)

WWE event chronology
← Previous; NXT TakeOver: Unstoppable	Next → Money in the Bank

Elimination Chamber chronology
← Previous; 2014	Next → 2017

The 2015 Elimination Chamber (known as No Escape in Germany) was a professional wrestling pay-per-view (PPV) and livestreaming event produced by WWE. It was the sixth annual Elimination Chamber event and took place on May 31, 2015, at the American Bank Center in Corpus Christi, Texas. The event centered on the men's Elimination Chamber match, a type of roofed steel cage that surrounds the ring and ringside area with no disqualifications; the objective is to eliminate all other opponents either by pinfall or submission with championship implications at stake.

Seven matches were contested at the event, including one on the Kickoff pre-show. In the main event, Dean Ambrose defeated WWE World Heavyweight Champion Seth Rollins by disqualification but did not win the title as titles do not change hands by disqualification unless stipulated. There were two Elimination Chamber matches on the undercard; one saw Ryback defeat Dolph Ziggler, King Barrett, Mark Henry, R-Truth, and Sheamus to win the vacant WWE Intercontinental Championship, while in the other, which was the opening bout, The New Day (Big E, Kofi Kingston, and Xavier Woods) defeated The Ascension (Konnor and Viktor), The Lucha Dragons (Kalisto and Sin Cara), Los Matadores (Diego and Fernando), The Prime Time Players (Darren Young and Titus O'Neil), and Tyson Kidd and Cesaro to retain the WWE Tag Team Championship. Also on the card, NXT Champion Kevin Owens defeated WWE United States Champion John Cena in a non-title match, which was Owens's main roster debut match.

This was the only Elimination Chamber event to be held in May; previous and future incarnations have taken place in February (except 2020 and 2025, which both took place in March). The event aired exclusively on the WWE Network in the United States, marking the first Elimination Chamber to be broadcast on the service, and it was available on PPV in various territories outside the country. It was also the first event to include a tag team Elimination Chamber match, and it was the first event in WWE history where the Chamber did not play host to a match for a world championship or future world championship match. An Elimination Chamber event was not held in 2016, but it returned in 2017; in turn, it was the last Elimination Chamber event to be held before the reintroduction of the brand extension in July 2016 and the last event to feature the original circular Elimination Chamber structure that was used since 2002 as it became square and slightly smaller upon its return in 2017.

== Production ==
=== Background ===
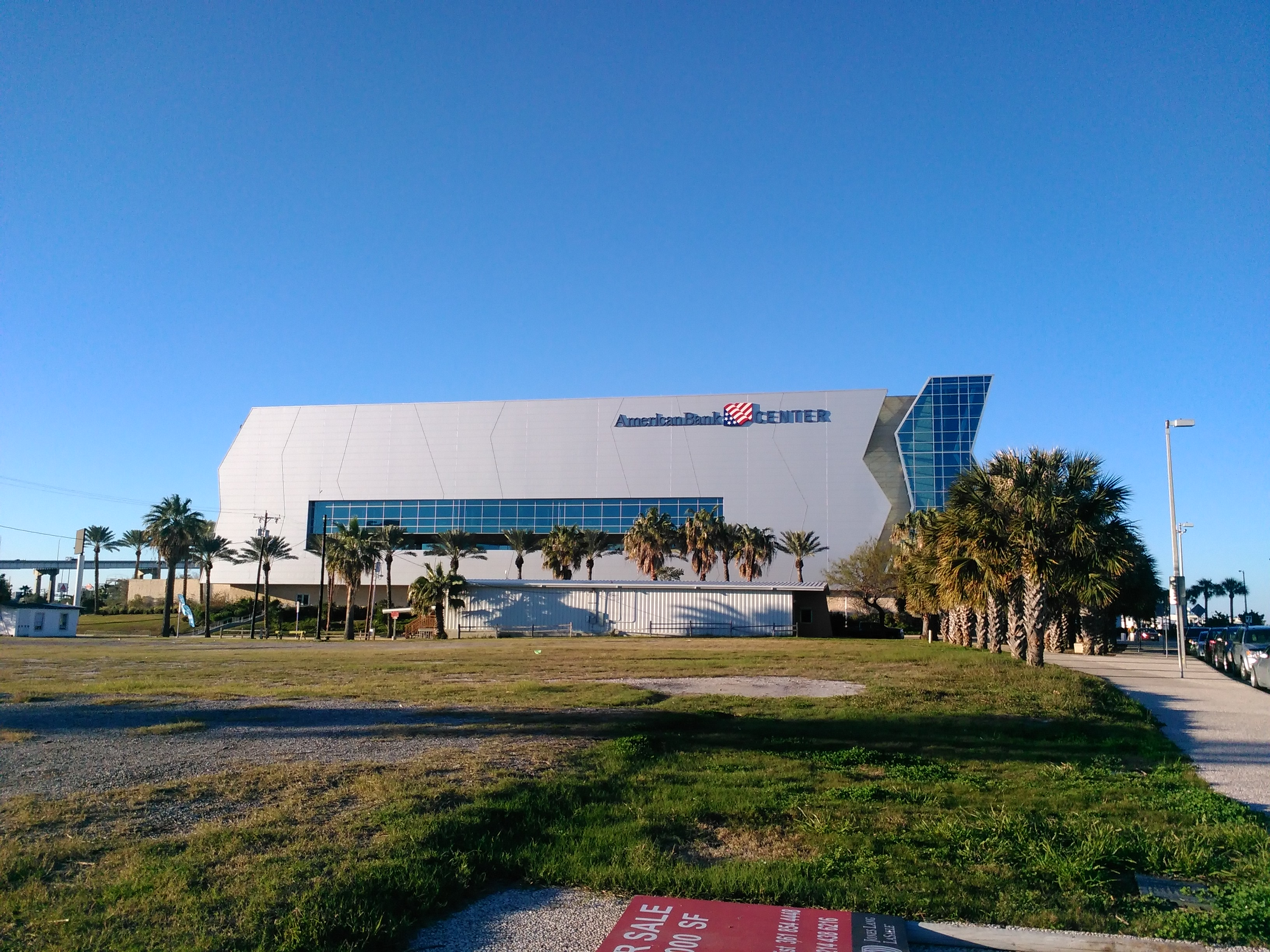
The sixth annual Elimination Chamber was held at the American Bank Center in Corpus Christi, Texas.

Elimination Chamber is a professional wrestling pay-per-view (PPV) event originally produced every February by WWE since 2010. The concept of the event is that one or two main event matches are contested inside the Elimination Chamber, either with championships or future opportunities at championships at stake.

The sixth Elimination Chamber event was originally scheduled to be a house show, a wrestling show that is not televised, but it was announced during the May 11, 2015, episode of Raw that Elimination Chamber would return on May 31, 2015, and be held at the American Bank Center in Corpus Christi, Texas. The event was initially replaced in February by Fastlane because many arenas were not able to physically support the Elimination Chamber structure, thus making it easier to book the February event without the structure. WWE's other originally scheduled live event for May 31 in Greenville, South Carolina was canceled in order to bring the entire WWE roster to Corpus Christi, with Greenville later getting an episode of Raw on November 16. The day after the 2014 event, WWE launched their online streaming service, the WWE Network, and it was announced that the 2015 Elimination Chamber would livestream exclusively on the Network in the United States. Outside the U.S., it was made available on traditional pay-per-view (PPV), including in Bahrain, Egypt, and Germany.

The Elimination Chamber match is an elimination-based match contested in a type of large roofed steel cage that surrounds the wrestling ring with an elevated platform around the ring. Within the Chamber are four inner pods, one behind each ring post. The match is contested by six participants. Two wrestlers start the match, while the other four are held within each inner pod with one selected randomly to enter the match at regular intervals, which continues until all four have been released. The objective is to eliminate all other opponents by pinfall or submission, and there are no disqualifications or count-outs. With the scheduling of the first-ever tag team Elimination Chamber match at the 2015 event, the rules remained mostly the same, except two teams (four wrestlers) started the match, both members of a team were released from their pod at the same time, and only one person from a team had to be eliminated to eliminate both members of that team.

In 2011 and since 2013, the show has been promoted as "No Escape" in Germany as it was feared that the name "Elimination Chamber" may remind people of the gas chambers used during the Holocaust; it was promoted as "No Way Out" in 2010 and 2012.

=== Storylines ===
The event comprised eight matches, including one on the Kickoff pre-show, that resulted from scripted storylines. Results were predetermined by WWE's writers, while storylines were produced on WWE's weekly television shows, Raw and SmackDown.

On May 17, an Elimination Chamber match for the vacant Intercontinental Championship was scheduled for the event. On the May 18 episode of Raw, R-Truth, Sheamus, King Barrett, Ryback, Dolph Ziggler, and Rusev were added to the match. On May 31, Rusev was declared unable to compete because of an injury sustained three nights prior on SmackDown. Rusev was replaced by Mark Henry.

At Payback, The New Day (Big E and Kofi Kingston, accompanied by Xavier Woods) defeated Tyson Kidd and Cesaro to retain the WWE Tag Team Championship in a two out of three falls tag team match. Later in the event, The New Day were scheduled to defend the title in the first-ever tag team Elimination Chamber match at the event. On the May 18 episode of Raw, Kidd and Cesaro, Los Matadores (Diego and Fernando) (with El Torito), The Ascension (Konnor and Viktor), The Lucha Dragons (Kalisto and Sin Cara), and The Prime Time Players (Darren Young and Titus O'Neil) were revealed as challengers.

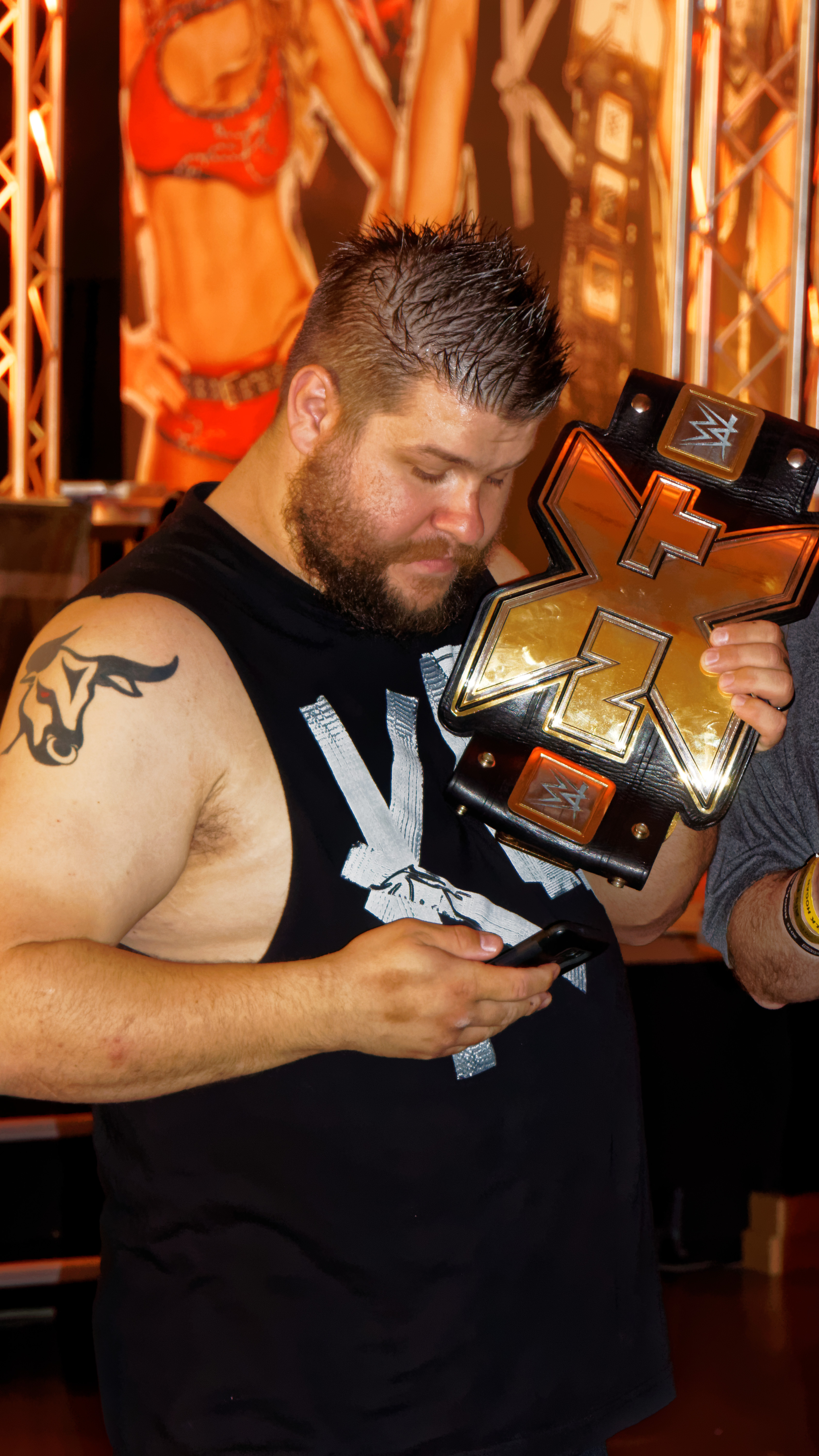
Kevin Owens, the reigning NXT Champion, defeated reigning WWE United States Champion, John Cena, in a non-title match at the event, which was Owens's WWE main roster debut match.

On the May 18 episode of Raw, NXT Champion Kevin Owens answered United States Champion John Cena's weekly United States Championship Open Challenge. However, instead of fighting Cena, Owens attacked him, saying they would fight on his "own terms". Later in the night, Owens was granted a match to face Cena at the event.

On the May 18 episode of Raw, Dean Ambrose challenged WWE World Heavyweight Champion Seth Rollins to a title match but Rollins refused. Later in the night, Ambrose attacked Rollins until The Authority granted Ambrose a title match against Rollins at Elimination Chamber. On the last Raw before the event, The Authority tried to avoid the match by having Ambrose taken away from the arena in a police van before the official contract signing. However, Ambrose drove the van back into the arena and signed the contract for the match.

At Payback, Naomi and Tamina defeated The Bella Twins (Nikki Bella and Brie Bella). After Nikki defeated Naomi by disqualification in a Divas Championship match on the May 18 episode of Raw, Paige returned from injury and attacked both contestants. On the May 21 episode of SmackDown, Naomi and Tamina attacked Paige before Nikki attacked Naomi, Tamina, and Paige. Nikki was then scheduled to defend the title against Paige and Naomi in a triple threat match at the event with Tamina banned from ringside.

On the May 18 episode of Raw, Bo Dallas confronted Neville during an interview and later, after Neville had lost a match to King Barrett, attacked Neville. On the May 25 episode of Raw, after Neville defeated Stardust, Dallas attacked Neville again. A match between the two was scheduled for the event.

== Event ==
Other on-screen personnel
Role:	Name:
English commentators	Michael Cole
English commentators	Jerry Lawler
English commentators	John "Bradshaw" Layfield
Spanish commentators	Carlos Cabrera
Spanish commentators	Marcelo Rodriguez
Backstage interviewer	Tom Phillips
Ring announcers	Lilian Garcia
Referees	Charles Robinson
Referees	Mike Chioda
Referees	Ryan Tran
Referees	Darrick Moore
Referees	Dan Engler
Referees	Matt Bennett
Referees	Chad Patton
Pre-show panel	Renee Young
Pre-show panel	Booker T
Pre-show panel	Corey Graves
Pre-show panel	Byron Saxton

=== Pre-show ===
During the Elimination Chamber Kickoff pre-show, Stardust faced Zack Ryder. Stardust pinned Ryder after "The Queen's Crossbow" to win the match.

The Miz hosted an edition of "Miz TV", with Daniel Bryan as his guest. The Miz began to take credit for Bryan's accomplishments, which led to Bryan calling out The Meta Powers (Curtis Axel and Macho Mandow). The Meta Powers attacked The Miz to end the segment.

=== Preliminary matches ===
The actual pay-per-view opened with the Elimination Chamber tag team match for the WWE Tag Team Championship. The Prime Time Players (Darren Young and Titus O'Neil) entered the chamber at #1. Los Matadores (Primo and Epico) entered at #2, along with their mascot El Torito. Tyson Kidd and Cesaro entered at #3. The New Day (Big E, Kofi Kingston, and Xavier Woods) entered at #4. The Ascension (Konnor and Viktor) entered at #5 whilst The Lucha Dragons (Kalisto and Sin Cara) entered at #6 starting the match. Los Matadores were eliminated by The Acension when Diego was pinned by Konnor after the "Fall of Man". The Lucha Dragons were eliminated by The Ascension when Kalisto was pinned by Konnor after the "Fall of Man". The Prime Time Players eliminated The Ascension when Young pinned Viktor after a "Gut Check". Cesaro and Kidd were eliminated by The Prime Time Players when Young pinned Cesaro with a schoolboy. The Prime Time Players were eliminated when O'Neil was pinned by Kingston after a "Trouble in Paradise", resulting in The New Day retaining the WWE Tag Team Championship.

Next, Nikki Bella defended the WWE Divas Championship against Paige and Naomi in a triple threat match. Near the end of the match, Naomi performed an inverted frankensteiner on Paige for a near-fall and then attempted an enzuigiri on Nikki. Nikki countered into a "Rack Attack" to retain the title.

After that, NXT Champion Kevin Owens faced WWE United States Champion John Cena. Owens executed a pop-up powerbomb on Cena for a near-fall. Cena performed an "Attitude Adjustment" on Owens for a near-fall. Owens taunted and mocked Cena's "you can't see me" gesture, but Cena applied the STF, only for Owens to escape. Owens executed an "Attitude Adjustment" on Cena for a near-fall. Cena performed a clothesline on Owens and attempted another one, but Owens executed a second pop-up powerbomb on Cena to win the match. After the match, Owens gave a promo telling Cena to leave while Owens's time was now.

In the fourth match, Neville faced Bo Dallas. At the end of the match, as Dallas attempted a "Bo-Dog", Neville countered into an enzuigiri on Dallas. Neville executed a "Red Arrow" on Dallas to win the match.

In the penultimate match, the Elimination Chamber match for the vacant WWE Intercontinental Championship was contested. Mark Henry entered the chamber at #1. Sheamus entered at #2. R-Truth entered at #3. Ryback entered at #4. King Barrett and Dolph Ziggler entered at #5 and #6 and began the match as the first two participants. R-Truth was the first to be released, and Mark Henry was released early after Barrett tackled Ziggler into Henry's Pod, breaking the Pod. Ryback was released next and Barrett was eliminated by R-Truth following a superkick from Ziggler, Snake eyes from Ryback and a "Lie Detector" from R-Truth. Sheamus was released last. R-Truth was eliminated by Ryback following "Shell Shocked". Henry was eliminated by Sheamus following a "Brogue Kick". Ziggler was eliminated by Sheamus following a "Brogue Kick". Ryback pinned Sheamus following "Shell Shocked", thus winning his first Intercontinental Championship and his first title in WWE overall.

=== Main event ===
In the main event, Seth Rollins defended the WWE World Heavyweight Championship against Dean Ambrose. At the end of the match, Ambrose attempted a diving elbow drop, but Rollins pulled the referee in front of him who was knocked down. Rollins attempted a Phoenix splash, but Ambrose avoided it and pinned Rollins after a "Dirty Deeds", giving Ambrose the championship. However, the decision was changed to Rollins being disqualified due to using the referee as a guard, so the championship didn't change hands. After the match, Rollins, Kane, Jamie Noble, and Joey Mercury attacked Ambrose. Roman Reigns then appeared, attacking Rollins with a superman punch and threw the title belt to Ambrose. Reigns then fought off Kane with a spear and Noble and Mercury with superman punches. The event ended with Ambrose and Reigns leaving through the crowd with the championship.

== Reception ==
The event received generally mixed reviews. Jason Powell of Pro Wrestling Dot Net found both Elimination Chamber matches "disappointing"; he called the first a "train wreck opener", and the second "flat". Mike Tedesco of WrestleView thought the event was excellent, particularly the Owens vs. Cena match while also praising the Tag Team Elimination Chamber match. Nolan Howells of Slam Sports criticized the Intercontinental Championship Elimination Chamber match and gave it a negative score of 1.75 out of 5, but praised the John Cena vs. Kevin Owens match and gave it 4.5 out of 5. Howells gave the main event a 3 out of 5. He wrote "The world title match was a truly great match ruined by a truly awful finish. Predictable and put a whole set of nails in the coffin of an already dead crowd."

== Aftermath ==
After Dean Ambrose stole the WWE World Heavyweight Championship belt, on the following night's episode of Raw, The Authority demanded that Ambrose have a rematch with Rollins. Roman Reigns then appeared to tell them that Ambrose would be coming back with the belt only if Rollins was man enough for the title at Money in the Bank in a ladder match. Despite The Authority's objections, Rollins accepted the challenge.

During Elimination Chamber, a rematch between John Cena and Kevin Owens was scheduled for Money in the Bank.

This event is notable for being the final televised match for Tyson Kidd, as he suffered a career-ending neck injury during a dark match with Samoa Joe the next night before Raw.

On the following episode of SmackDown, The Prime Time Players (Titus O'Neil and Darren Young) defeated The Lucha Dragons (Kalisto and Sin Cara) and The Ascension (Konnor and Viktor) in a triple threat tag team match to become the number one contenders for The New Day's (Kofi Kingston, Big E, and Xavier Woods) WWE Tag Team Championship at Money in the Bank.

On the June 8 episode of Raw, R-Truth was scheduled to face King Barrett at Money in the Bank.

On the following episode of Raw, Nikki Bella defended the Divas Championship against Paige. Nikki retained after Brie Bella switched places with Nikki during the match and pinned Paige. On June 8, a title rematch between Paige and Nikki was scheduled for Money in the Bank. This was the last Elimination Chamber event to feature the Divas Championship as it was retired and replaced by a new WWE Women's Championship during the WrestleMania 32 pre-show in April 2016.

An Elimination Chamber event was not scheduled for 2016, however, the event was reinstated in 2017. Following the reintroduction of the brand split in July 2016, the 2017 event was held exclusively for wrestlers from the SmackDown brand. The 2017 event also returned Elimination Chamber to its regular February slot with Fastlane moving to the March slot. The only exceptions to this were the 2020 event that was held in March due to Super ShowDown being held in February that year (a Fastlane event did not occur in 2020), and the 2025 event that was also held in March due to that year's Royal Rumble being held in February (Fastlane had since been discontinued). Also with its return in 2017, the Elimination Chamber structure was redesigned, becoming square and slightly smaller.

== Results ==
No.	Results	Stipulations	Times
1^{P}	Stardust defeated Zack Ryder by pinfall	Singles match	6:12
2	The New Day (Big E, Kofi Kingston, and Xavier Woods) (c) defeated The Prime Time Players (Darren Young and Titus O'Neil), Tyson Kidd and Cesaro (with Natalya), The Ascension (Konnor and Viktor), The Lucha Dragons (Kalisto and Sin Cara), and Los Matadores (Diego and Fernando) (with El Torito)	Tag team Elimination Chamber match for the WWE Tag Team Championship	23:40
3	Nikki Bella (c) defeated Naomi and Paige by pinfall	Triple threat match for the WWE Divas Championship	6:04
4	NXT Champion Kevin Owens defeated WWE United States Champion John Cena by pinfall	Champion vs Champion match	19:57
5	Neville defeated Bo Dallas by pinfall	Singles match	8:54
6	Ryback defeated Sheamus, Dolph Ziggler, Mark Henry, R-Truth, and King Barrett	Elimination Chamber match for the vacant WWE Intercontinental Championship	25:12
7	Dean Ambrose defeated Seth Rollins (c) (with Jamie Noble, Joey Mercury, and Kane) by disqualification	Singles match for the WWE World Heavyweight Championship; Roman Reigns was barred from ringside.	21:49
(c) / – the champion(s) heading into the match; P / – the match was broadcast on the pre-show

=== Tag Team Championship Elimination Chamber details ===
Eliminated	Wrestler (Team)	Entered	Eliminated by	Method	Time
1	Diego (Los Matadores)	4	Konnor and Viktor (The Ascension)	pinfall	10:22
2	Kalisto (The Lucha Dragons)	2	Konnor and Viktor (The Ascension)	pinfall	11:20
3	Viktor (The Ascension)	1	Darren Young (The Prime Time Players)	pinfall	13:30
4	Cesaro (Tyson Kidd and Cesaro)	3	Darren Young (The Prime Time Players)	pinfall	18:28
5	Titus O'Neil (The Prime Time Players)	5	Big E, Kofi Kingston, and Xavier Woods (The New Day)	pinfall	23:40
Winner	Big E, Kofi Kingston, and Xavier Woods (The New Day) (c)	6			23:40

=== Intercontinental Championship Elimination Chamber details ===
Eliminated	Wrestler	Entered	Eliminated by	Method	Times
1	King Barrett	1	R-Truth	pinfall	11:05
2	R-Truth	3	Ryback	pinfall	14:00
3	Mark Henry	4	Sheamus	pinfall	17:20
4	Dolph Ziggler	2	Sheamus	pinfall	20:25
5	Sheamus	6	Ryback	pinfall	25:12
Winner	Ryback	5			25:12
