= Night of Champions (2015) =

WWE pay-per-view and livestreaming event

- Promotional poster featuring Sting
- Promotion: WWE
- Date: September 20, 2015
- City: Houston, Texas
- Venue: Toyota Center
- Attendance: 14,369
- Buy rate: 77,000 (excluding WWE Network views)

WWE event chronology
← Previous; SummerSlam	Next → Live from Madison Square Garden

Night of Champions chronology
← Previous; 2014	Next → 2023

The 2015 Night of Champions was a professional wrestling pay-per-view (PPV) and livestreaming event produced by WWE. It was the ninth annual Night of Champions and took place on September 20, 2015, at the Toyota Center in Houston, Texas, which was the second time the event was held at the venue, after the inaugural Vengeance: Night of Champions in 2007. The theme of the event was that all five of WWE's active main roster championships at the time were defended.

Eight matches were contested at the event, with one match on the Kickoff pre-show. In the main event, Seth Rollins defeated Sting to retain the WWE World Heavyweight Championship. In the penultimate match, John Cena defeated Rollins to win the WWE United States Championship. In other prominent matches, Kevin Owens defeated Ryback to win the WWE Intercontinental Championship, and Charlotte defeated Nikki Bella to win the WWE Divas Championship. With this win, Charlotte became the final holder of the title before it was retired at WrestleMania 32 in April 2016. The event also marked the returns of Chris Jericho and Kane.

The event, which included Sting's sole PPV main event and title match in WWE, which would in turn be his final match in the promotion, generated 77,000 pay-per-view buys (excluding WWE Network views), up from the previous year's 48,000. The following year, Night of Champions was replaced by the similarly themed Clash of Champions; however, WWE revived Night of Champions in 2023. This in turn made the 2015 event the final Night of Champions to be held before the reintroduction of the brand extension in July 2016. This would also be the final Night of Champions to carry its original theme, as although the events since 2023 have been based around championship matches, not every active championship has been defended on each event since. This would also be the final Night of Champions held in the United States, as since 2023, the events have been held in Saudi Arabia.

== Production ==
=== Background ===
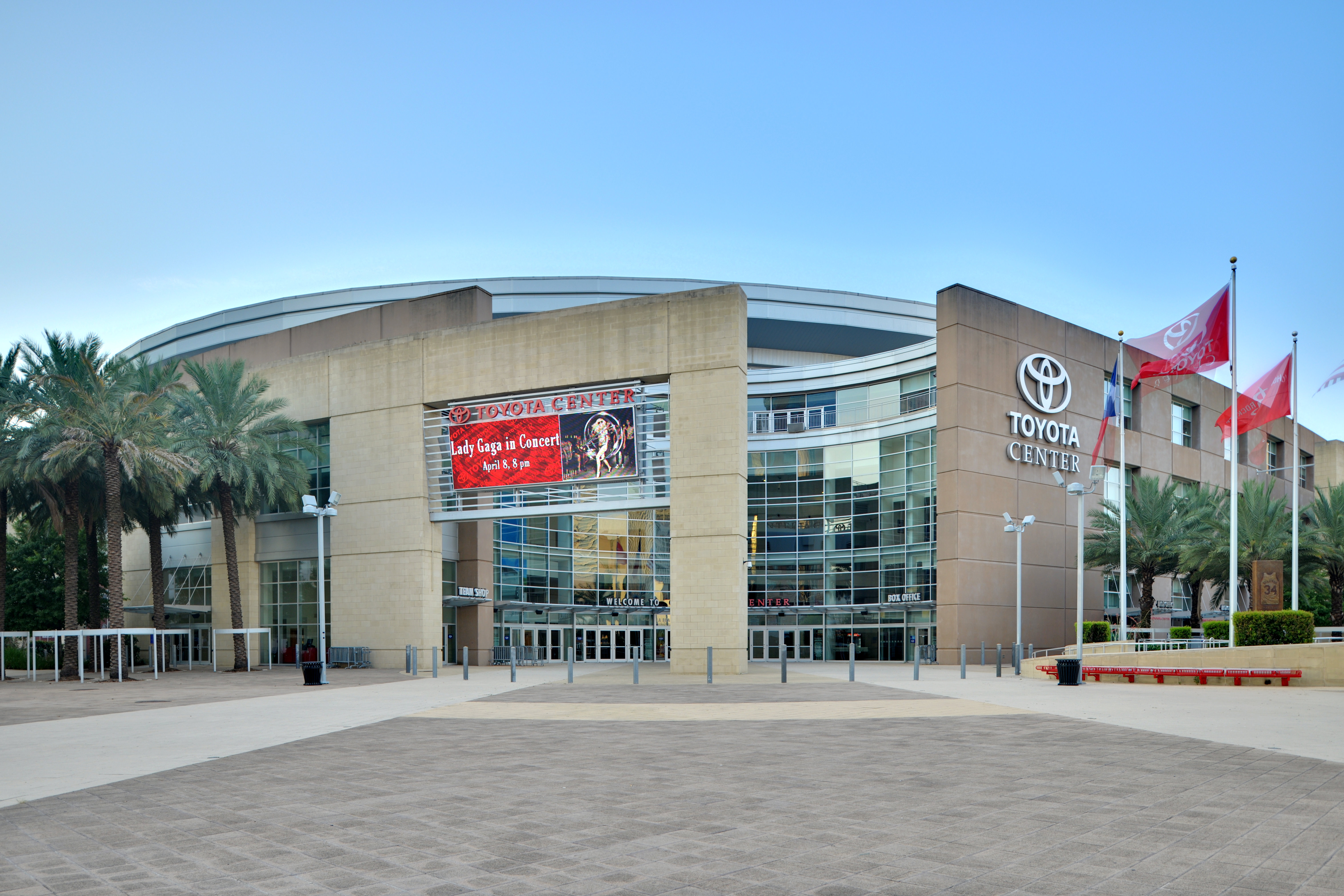
The ninth annual Night of Champions was the second time for the event to be held at the Toyota Center in Houston, Texas, after the inaugural 2007 event.

Night of Champions is a professional wrestling event produced by WWE since 2007, with the event based around championship matches. It was originally broadcast exclusively via pay-per-view (PPV) before it began simultaneously livestreaming on the WWE Network in 2014. Announced on June 2, 2015, the ninth event was scheduled to be held on September 20, 2015, at the Toyota Center in Houston, Texas, marking the second Night of Champions held at this venue after the inaugural 2007 event. As per the theme of the event, every active championship promoted on WWE's main roster at the time was defended, which included the WWE World Heavyweight Championship, the Intercontinental Championship, the United States Championship, the WWE Tag Team Championship, and the WWE Divas Championship. Tickets went on sale on July 11.

=== Storylines ===
The event comprised eight matches, including one on the Kickoff pre-show, that resulted from scripted storylines. Results were predetermined by WWE's writers, while storylines were produced on WWE's weekly television shows, Raw and SmackDown.

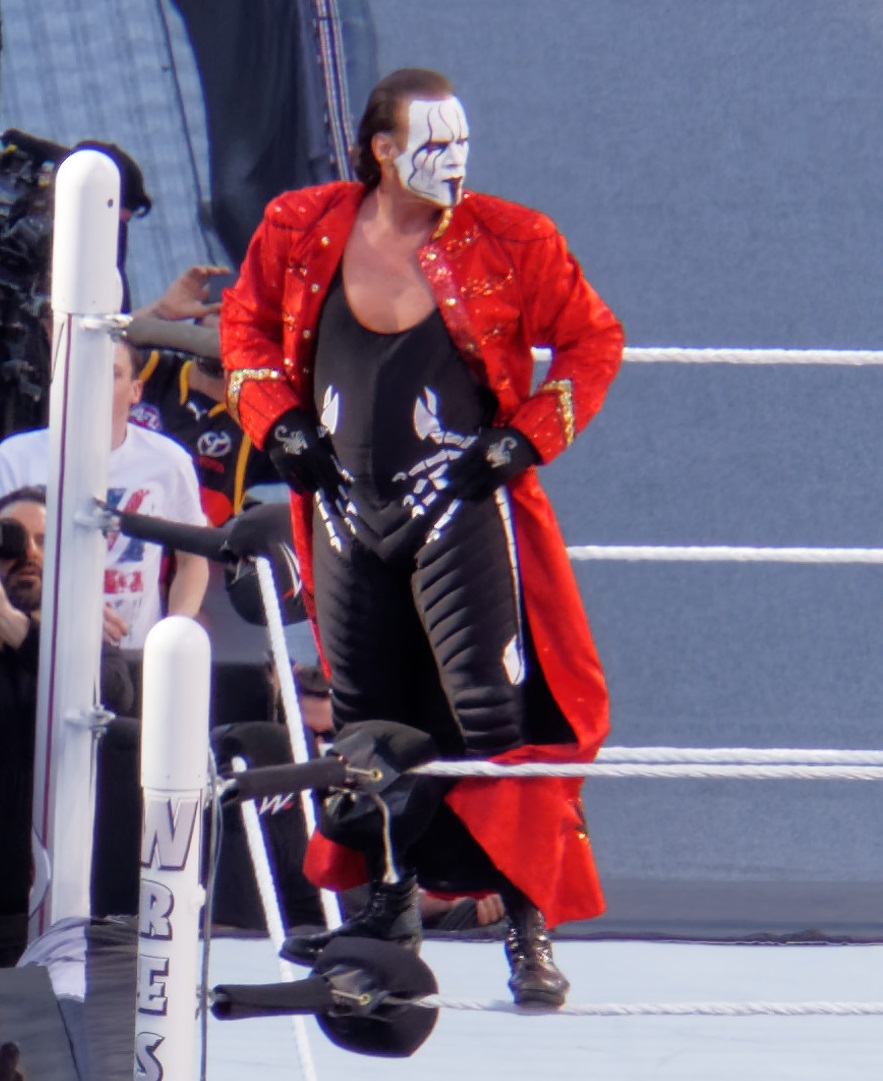
Sting faced Seth Rollins for the WWE World Heavyweight Championship. This was his only title match and pay-per-view main event in WWE, as well as his final match in the promotion.

At SummerSlam, Seth Rollins defeated John Cena to retain the WWE World Heavyweight Championship and win Cena's United States Championship. On the August 24 episode of Raw, The Authority attempted to present Rollins with a statue for winning, but instead Sting made his return to WWE for the first time since the night after WrestleMania 31 and attacked Rollins, challenging Rollins for the WWE World Heavyweight Championship by raising it over his head. Triple H then scheduled Rollins to defend the WWE World title against Sting at Night of Champions. On the August 31 episode of Raw, Cena invoked his rematch clause to face Rollins for the United States Championship at Night of Champions.

At SummerSlam, Roman Reigns and Dean Ambrose defeated Bray Wyatt and Luke Harper. On the August 24 episode of Raw, during a rematch between both teams, Braun Strowman made his WWE debut, aligning with Wyatt and Harper and attacking Reigns and Ambrose. On the August 31 episode of Raw, Strowman made his in-ring debut, defeating Ambrose by disqualification. On September 5, a six-man tag team match pitting Wyatt, Harper, and Strowman against Reigns, Ambrose, and a partner of their choice was scheduled for Night of Champions.

At SummerSlam, Dolph Ziggler and Rusev fought to a double countout. On the September 7 episode of Raw, a rematch was scheduled for Night of Champions.

At SummerSlam, The New Day (Kofi Kingston and Big E, accompanied by Xavier Woods) defeated The Prime Time Players (Titus O'Neil and Darren Young), The Lucha Dragons (Kalisto and Sin Cara), and Los Matadores (Diego and Fernando) in a fatal four-way tag team match to win the WWE Tag Team Championship. The next night on Raw, after The New Day defeated The Lucha Dragons, The Dudley Boyz (Bubba Ray Dudley and D-Von Dudley) returned to WWE and attacked The New Day. The next week on Raw, The Dudleyz defeated The New Day. The next week on Raw, The New Day were scheduled to defend the titles against The Prime Time Players the next week, and were successful, thus setting up a title match between The New Day and The Dudleyz for Night of Champions.

Kevin Owens interrupted Intercontinental Champion Ryback's interview on the September 7 episode of Raw and attacked the champion on the September 10 episode of SmackDown during a lumberjack match against Seth Rollins. On the September 14 episode of Raw, Ryback was scheduled to defend the title against Owens at Night of Champions.

At SummerSlam, PCB (Paige, Charlotte, and Becky Lynch) defeated Team Bella (Nikki Bella, Brie Bella, and Alicia Fox) and Team B.A.D. (Naomi, Sasha Banks, and Tamina) in a Three team elimination match. On the August 31 episode of Raw, three Beat the Clock Challenge matches were held to determine a new number one contender to face Nikki for the WWE Divas Championship at Night of Champions. Lynch defeated Fox in 3:21, Charlotte defeated Brie in 1:40, and Paige and Banks wrestled to a time limit draw, giving Charlotte the win and the title shot. On the September 7 episode of Raw, Charlotte was awarded a title match against Nikki the following week. During the match, Nikki switched places with Brie, so Charlotte pinned Brie instead. Stephanie McMahon decided that Charlotte could not win the title by pinning Brie but scheduled a rematch for Night of Champions with the stipulation that should Nikki be disqualified or counted out, she would lose the title. With this win, Nikki became WWE Divas Champion at 294 days.

At SummerSlam, Neville and Stephen Amell defeated Stardust and King Barrett. On the September 3 episode of SmackDown, Neville was scheduled to face Stardust, but The Ascension (Konnor and Viktor) attacked Neville and allied with Stardust, preventing the match from occurring. On the September 14 episode of Raw, Neville allied with The Lucha Dragons (Kalisto and Sin Cara) and the trio attacked Stardust and The Ascension. A match pitting Neville and The Lucha Dragons against Stardust and The Ascension was then scheduled for the Night of Champions Kickoff pre-show.

== Event ==
Other on-screen personnel
Role:	Name:
English commentators	Michael Cole
English commentators	Jerry Lawler
English commentators	John "Bradshaw" Layfield
Spanish commentators	Carlos Cabrera
Spanish commentators	Marcelo Rodríguez
Spanish commentators	Jerry Soto
Backstage interviewer	Rich Brennan
Ring announcers	Lilian Garcia
Ring announcers	Eden Stiles
Referees	Mike Chioda
Referees	John Cone
Referees	Darrick Moore
Referees	Chad Patton
Referees	Dan Engler
Referees	Rod Zapata
Pre-show panel	Renee Young
Pre-show panel	Booker T
Pre-show panel	Byron Saxton
Pre-show panel	Corey Graves

=== Pre-show ===
During the Night of Champions Kickoff pre-show, Neville and The Lucha Dragons (Kalisto and Sin Cara) faced Stardust and The Ascension (Konnor and Viktor). The match ended when Stardust pushed Viktor, causing Neville to fall off the top rope. Stardust pinned Neville after a Queen's Crossbow to win the match.

=== Preliminary matches ===
The actual pay-per-view opened with Ryback defending the Intercontinental Championship against Kevin Owens. The end came when Ryback attempted Shell Shocked but Owens raked Ryback's eyes and pinned Ryback with a roll-up to win the title.

Next, Dolph Ziggler faced Rusev (with Summer Rae). The match ended when Summer Rae threw her shoe at the referee but the shoe hit Rusev instead, allowing Ziggler to pin Rusev after a Zig Zag.

After that, The New Day (Big E and Kofi Kingston) defended their WWE Tag Team Championship against The Dudley Boyz (Bubba Ray Dudley and D-Von Dudley). After Bubba Ray and D-Von had executed a 3D on Kingston, Bubba Ray attempted a pinfall, which was broken up by Xavier Woods. Accordingly, The New Day were disqualified, but retained the titles. After the match, The Dudley Boyz put Woods through a table with a 3D.

In the fourth match, Nikki Bella defended her Divas Championship against Charlotte, which Nikki would lose the title if she was counted out or disqualified per the stipulations. The match ended when Nikki dove off the second rope but Charlotte executed a Spear in mid-air on Nikki and forced her to submit to the Figure Eight Leglock to win the title.

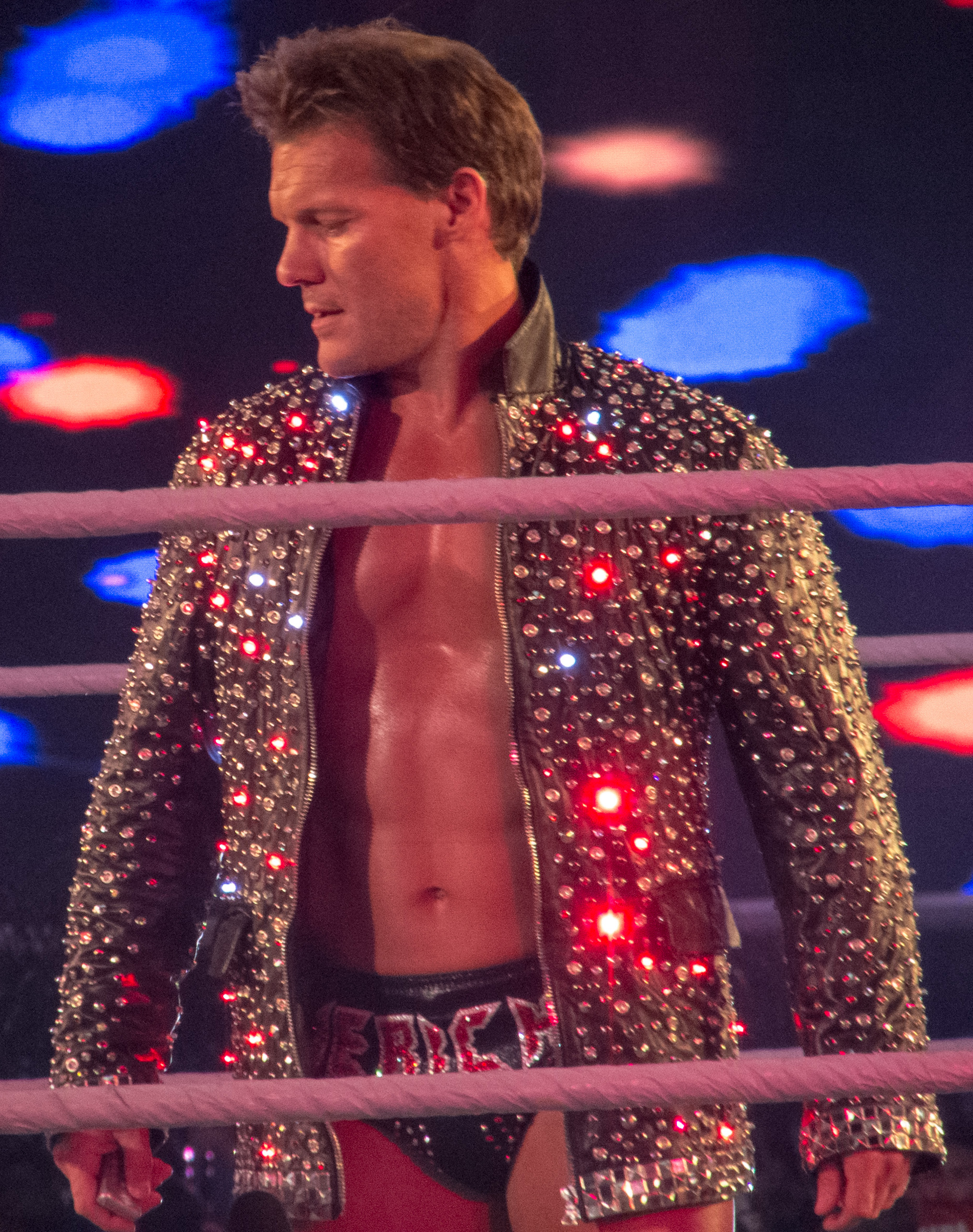
Chris Jericho was revealed as the mystery partner teaming up with Roman Reigns and Dean Ambrose against The Wyatt Family.

In the fifth match, The Wyatt Family (Bray Wyatt, Luke Harper, and Braun Strowman) faced Roman Reigns, Dean Ambrose, and their mystery partner, who was revealed to be Chris Jericho. In the climax, Reigns went for a Spear on Strowman but Jericho tagged himself in and performed a Lionsault on Strowman for a near-fall. Jericho attempted a Codebreaker but Strowman countered, executed a Yokosuka Cutter and then applied a Lifting Arm Triangle Choke on Jericho. Jericho passed out, giving The Wyatt Family the win by technical submission.

In the penultimate match, Seth Rollins defended the United States Championship against John Cena. In the end, Rollins attempted an Attitude Adjustment on Cena but Cena countered with an Inverted Suplex on Rollins, which he followed with a Diving Leg Drop Bulldog. Cena executed an Attitude Adjustment on Rollins to win the title. After the match, Rollins, who had a scheduled WWE World Heavyweight Championship defense next, retrieved his title belt and tried to walk backstage, but was stopped by Cena, who executed another Attitude Adjustment on Rollins.

=== Main event ===
In the main event, Seth Rollins defended the WWE World Heavyweight Championship against Sting. During the match, Sting pulled Rollins onto a broadcast table but Rollins pushed Sting, knocking him through another broadcast table. Sting performed a Scorpion Death Drop on Rollins but Rollins placed his foot on the bottom rope, voiding the pinfall. Rollins performed a Turnbuckle Powerbomb on Sting, who suffered a legitimate neck injury. Rollins attempted a Pedigree on Sting, who countered into a Scorpion Deathlock, but Rollins touched the ropes, forcing Sting to break the hold. The match ended when Rollins attempted a Pedigree but Sting countered and attempted a Scorpion Deathlock, which Rollins countered with a small package on Sting to retain the title.

While Rollins was celebrating, Sheamus appeared to cash in his Money in the Bank contract. Rollins attempted to attack Sheamus with the WWE World Heavyweight Championship but Sheamus avoided and executed a Brogue Kick on Rollins. Before Sheamus could cash in, Kane appeared and performed Chokeslams on Rollins and Sheamus. Kane then executed a Tombstone Piledriver on Rollins and stood over him as the event ended.

== Aftermath ==
Following the event, WWE confirmed that Sting sustained an injury during his match with Rollins. Sting injured his neck when he received a powerbomb onto a turnbuckle. The title match with Rollins would be Sting's final match in WWE, as on April 2, 2016, during his WWE Hall of Fame induction speech, Sting announced his retirement. However, after five years and after his legends contract with WWE expired, Sting debuted in rival promotion All Elite Wrestling (AEW) in December 2020 at Dynamite: Winter Is Coming; he officially came out of retirement, having his first match in over five years at AEW's Revolution pay-per-view on March 7, 2021. On March 3, 2024, Sting wrestled his final match at that year's Revolution and retired for the second and final time.

The following night on Raw, "Corporate Kane" returned and resumed his position as Director of Operations, seemingly oblivious to his attack on Rollins at Night of Champions. Following a series of confrontations, Kane received a title match against Rollins at Hell in a Cell, which Rollins won. As a result, Kane lost his position as Director of Operations.

Also on Raw, when Charlotte was celebrating her victory over Nikki Bella at Night of Champions, her teammate Paige went on a rant about how there was no Divas Revolution, telling Charlotte the reason she won the Divas Championship was because of her father Ric Flair and telling Becky Lynch that she was irrelevant in PCB, thus turning heel in the process. A rematch between Charlotte and Nikki for the Divas Championship was later scheduled for Hell in a Cell.

Later in the same show, Randy Orton joined forces with Roman Reigns and Dean Ambrose as he attacked The Wyatt Family. A Hell in a Cell match between Reigns and Bray Wyatt was later scheduled for Hell in a Cell.

Ryback invoked his rematch clause for the Intercontinental Championship against Kevin Owens on the October 1 episode of SmackDown, where Ryback won by count out, meaning Owens retained the championship. The two had another title match at Hell in a Cell.

Before Dean Ambrose and Roman Reigns revealed Chris Jericho as their mystery partner, a fan managed to jump the barricade and enter the ring without getting caught by security. WWE would later release a statement on this situation, stating that "WWE takes the safety of our performers very seriously, and any fan entering the ring area will be prosecuted to the fullest extent of the law".

In 2016, Night of Champions was replaced by the similarly themed Clash of Champions. Also in July that year, WWE reintroduced the brand extension, which again split the main roster between the Raw and SmackDown brands where wrestlers were exclusively assigned to perform. In turn, the WWE World Heavyweight Championship and WWE Tag Team Championship were renamed WWE Championship and Raw Tag Team Championship, respectively, with both again renamed in 2024 as Undisputed WWE Championship and World Tag Team Championship, respectively. Additionally, in April 2016, the WWE Divas Championship was retired and replaced by a new WWE Women's Championship, which was renamed Raw Women's Championship in August, but reverted to WWE Women's Championship in 2023. Other new titles were also introduced. After nearly eight years, Night of Champions was reinstated in 2023, replacing the originally announced "King and Queen of the Ring" event that had been scheduled. The 2023 event, however, did not retain the original concept of Night of Champions and instead celebrated the crowning of a new World Heavyweight Champion and Roman Reigns' 1,000th day as Universal Champion. The 2023 event was also the first Night of Champions to livestream on Peacock, due to the American version of the WWE Network merging under Peacock in March 2021. The 2015 event would also be the final Night of Champions held in the United States, as all events since have been held in Saudi Arabia.

== Results ==
No.	Results	Stipulations	Times
1^{P}	Stardust and The Ascension (Konnor and Viktor) defeated Neville and The Lucha Dragons (Kalisto and Sin Cara) by pinfall	Six-man tag team match	9:44
2	Kevin Owens defeated Ryback (c) by pinfall	Singles match for the WWE Intercontinental Championship	9:32
3	Dolph Ziggler defeated Rusev (with Summer Rae) by pinfall	Singles match	13:47
4	The Dudley Boyz (Bubba Ray Dudley and D-Von Dudley) defeated The New Day (Big E and Kofi Kingston) (with Xavier Woods) (c) by disqualification	Tag team match for the WWE Tag Team Championship	9:57
5	Charlotte (with Becky Lynch and Paige) defeated Nikki Bella (c) (with Alicia Fox and Brie Bella) by submission	Singles match for the WWE Divas Championship; Had Nikki been counted out or disqualified, she would have lost the title.	12:41
6	The Wyatt Family (Bray Wyatt, Luke Harper, and Braun Strowman) defeated Roman Reigns, Dean Ambrose, and Chris Jericho by technical submission	Six-man tag team match	13:04
7	John Cena defeated Seth Rollins (c) by pinfall	Singles match for the WWE United States Championship	16:01
8	Seth Rollins (c) defeated Sting by pinfall	Singles match for the WWE World Heavyweight Championship	14:56
(c) / – the champion(s) heading into the match; P / – the match was broadcast on the pre-show
