= Ryback =

American professional wrestler (born 1981)

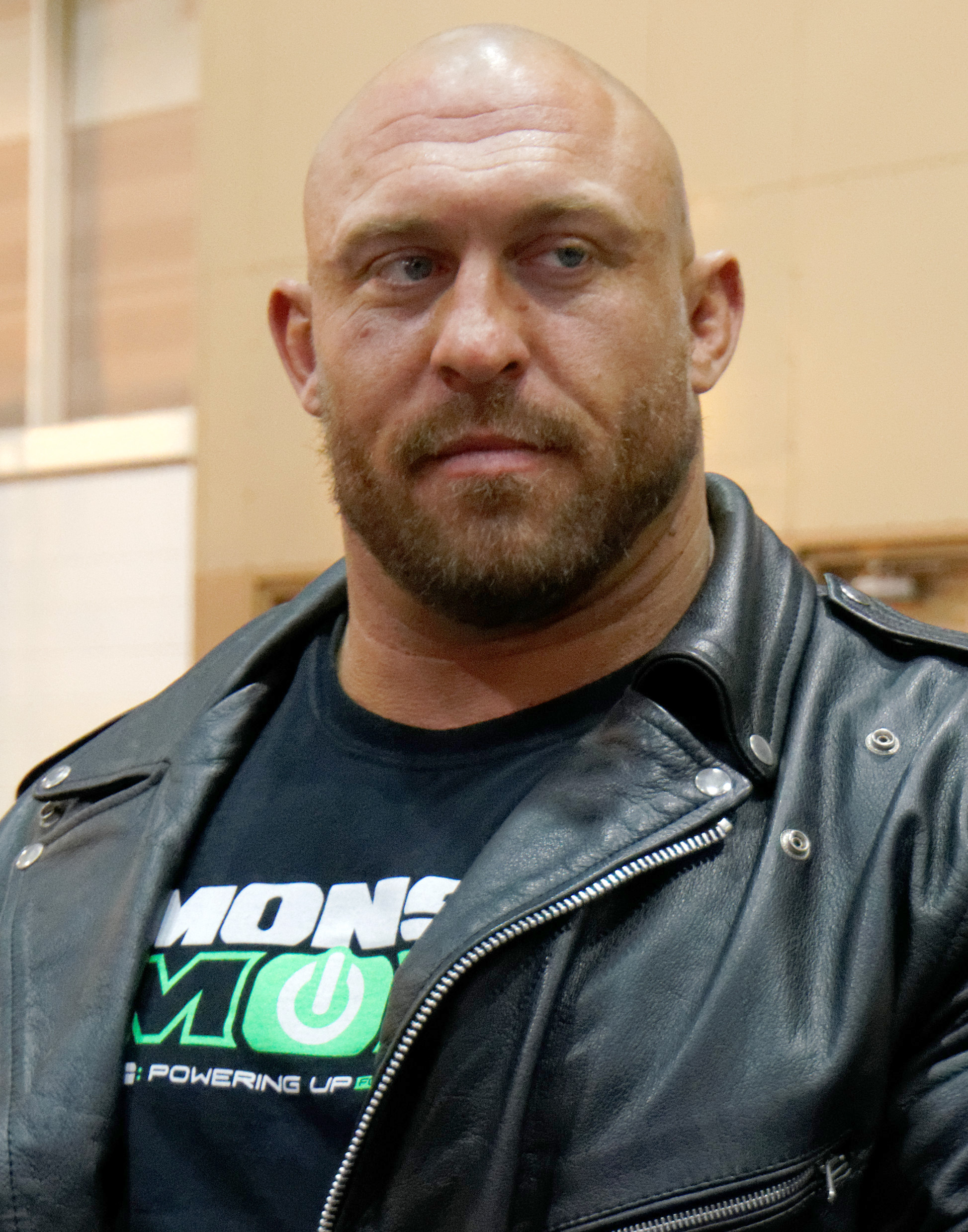
- Ryback in 2014

Personal information
- Born: Ryan Allen Reeves; November 10, 1981 (age 44) Las Vegas, Nevada, U.S.
- Website: feedmemore.com

Professional wrestling career
- Ring name(s): The Big Guy; Ryan Reeves; Ryback; Skip Sheffield
- Billed height: 6 ft 3 in (191 cm)
- Billed weight: 291 lb (132 kg)
- Billed from: College Station, Texas; Las Vegas, Nevada; Sin City
- Trained by: Al Snow; Bill DeMott; Jody Hamilton
- Debut: 2005
- Retired: 2018

YouTube information
- Channel: RybackTV
- Years active: 2016–present
- Genres: Food critic; Mukbang; ASMR
- Subscribers: 488 Thousand (2026)
- Views: 42.6 million (2026)
- Last updated: April 18, 2026

Ryback Allen Reeves (born Ryan Allen Reeves; November 10, 1981) is an American social media personality and retired professional wrestler. He is best known for his tenure in WWE, where he performed under the ring name Ryback.

One of the eight finalists on Tough Enough 4, Reeves later signed a developmental contract with WWE and performed under the ring names Ryback and Skip Sheffield in its developmental territories Deep South Wrestling (DSW), Ohio Valley Wrestling (OVW), and Florida Championship Wrestling (FCW). In 2010, as Skip Sheffield, he participated in the first season of NXT, joined WWE's main roster as a member of The Nexus, and headlined SummerSlam before being sidelined by an injury. He returned under the Ryback ring name in 2012, going on to headline multiple pay-per view events (usually as a contender for the WWE Championship) in 2012-13. Following this, Ryback became a one-time WWE Intercontinental Champion and later formed a tag team with Curtis Axel. After being released from WWE in 2016, Ryback went on to compete on the independent circuit for two years before retiring from professional wrestling.

Reeves is now actively posting on his YouTube channel, Ryback TV, where he primarily posts food reviews and mukbangs. As of November 5, 2026, he has over 506,000 subscribers.

== Early life ==
Ryback Allen Reeves was born Ryan Allen Reeves in Las Vegas on November 10, 1981. He started watching professional wrestling at the age of eight, and was a guest bell ringer at a live World Wrestling Federation (WWF, later WWE) event at the age of 13. Wanting to become a professional wrestler, Reeves began lifting weights at 12 years old and was nicknamed "Silverback" as a teenager after a friend joked that he resembled a gorilla, later adopting part of it as his name. He excelled at baseball and football while attending Western High School and Palo Verde High School. He also played baseball during his freshman year at the Community College of Southern Nevada, but broke his leg and missed two seasons. He attended the University of Nevada, Las Vegas, entering its fitness management program.

== Professional wrestling career ==
=== World Wrestling Entertainment/WWE (2004–2016) ===
==== Tough Enough and The Nexus (2004–2010) ====
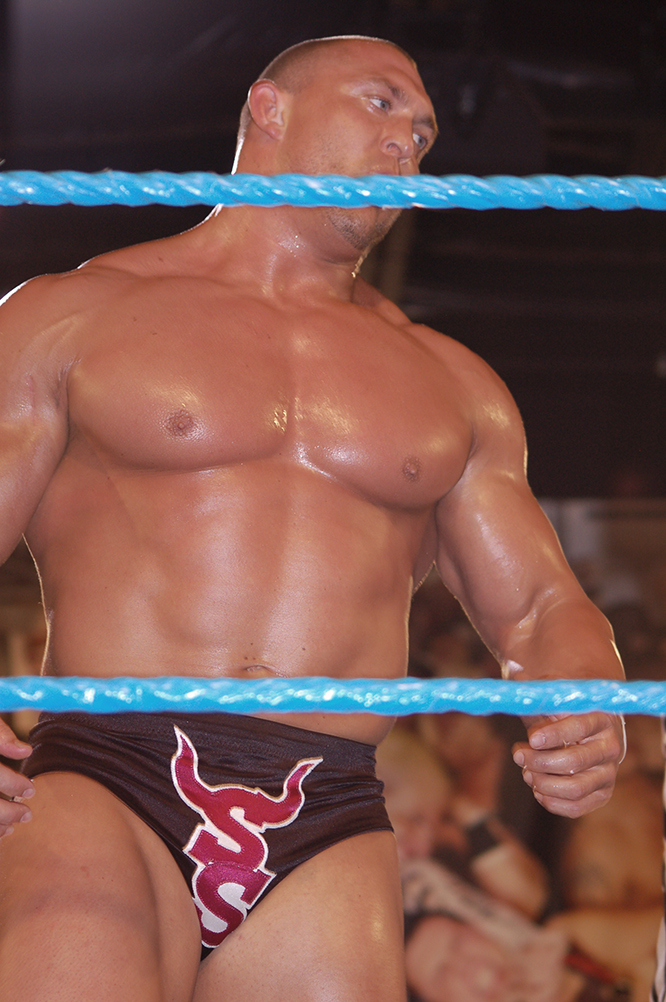
Sheffield at a Florida Championship Wrestling (FCW) event in 2009

Reeves sent a brief one-minute videotape of himself to become a contestant on WWE's reality television series, $1,000,000 Tough Enough, and was invited to Venice Beach with 49 others. During the first week of training, Reeves suffered from bronchitis and a rib injury. He eventually became one of the eight finalists to appear on SmackDown! and the last to be voted off. Even though he did not win the competition, Reeves impressed WWE officials enough for them to sign him to a developmental contract. He spent time healing from his injuries in Las Vegas before heading to Atlanta, Georgia in March 2005.

After training in Deep South Wrestling (DSW) for most of 2005 and early 2006, Reeves was transferred over to Ohio Valley Wrestling (OVW) in early March. In July 2006, Reeves was suspended for 30 days due to failing a drug test as part of WWE's Wellness Program. According to Reeves, he had been taking several over the counter bodybuilding supplements, one of which caused a positive reading. The supplements he was using were later taken off the market due to this effect and, although his suspension remained in place, Reeves eventually returned to the roster after passing a second test. His case was later placed on the CNN documentary Death Grip: Inside Pro Wrestling.

After over a year's absence, Reeves returned to OVW under the ring name Ryback and won the OVW Heavyweight Championship on October 15, 2008, before losing it in the same month. Soon after the title loss, Reeves was then re-signed to a developmental contract with WWE. From late 2008 to early 2010, Reeves wrestled in Florida Championship Wrestling (FCW) under the ring name Ryback and later Skip Sheffield.

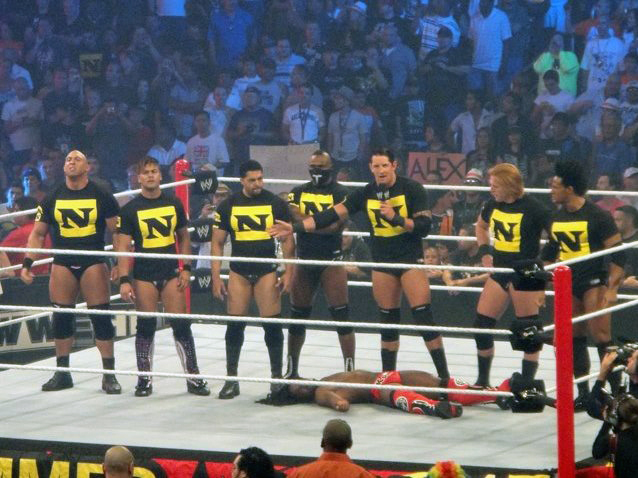
Reeves (far left) as Skip Sheffield at SummerSlam with The Nexus

On February 16, 2010, Sheffield was announced as one of eight FCW contestants to take part in the first season of WWE's new NXT show, where he finished sixth. On the June 7 episode of WWE Raw, Sheffield and the seven other NXT participants interfered in the main event match between John Cena and CM Punk, attacking both competitors as well as the announcing team before dismantling the ring area and surrounding equipment. The group, named The Nexus, would continue feuding with Cena over the following weeks. This resulted in a seven-on-seven elimination tag team match at the 2010 SummerSlam, where The Nexus lost to Team WWE led by Cena. In August, Reeves broke his ankle in three places during a match, which made him undergo three surgeries and kept him away from wrestling for over a year until December 2011.

==== WWE Championship pursuits (2012–2013) ====
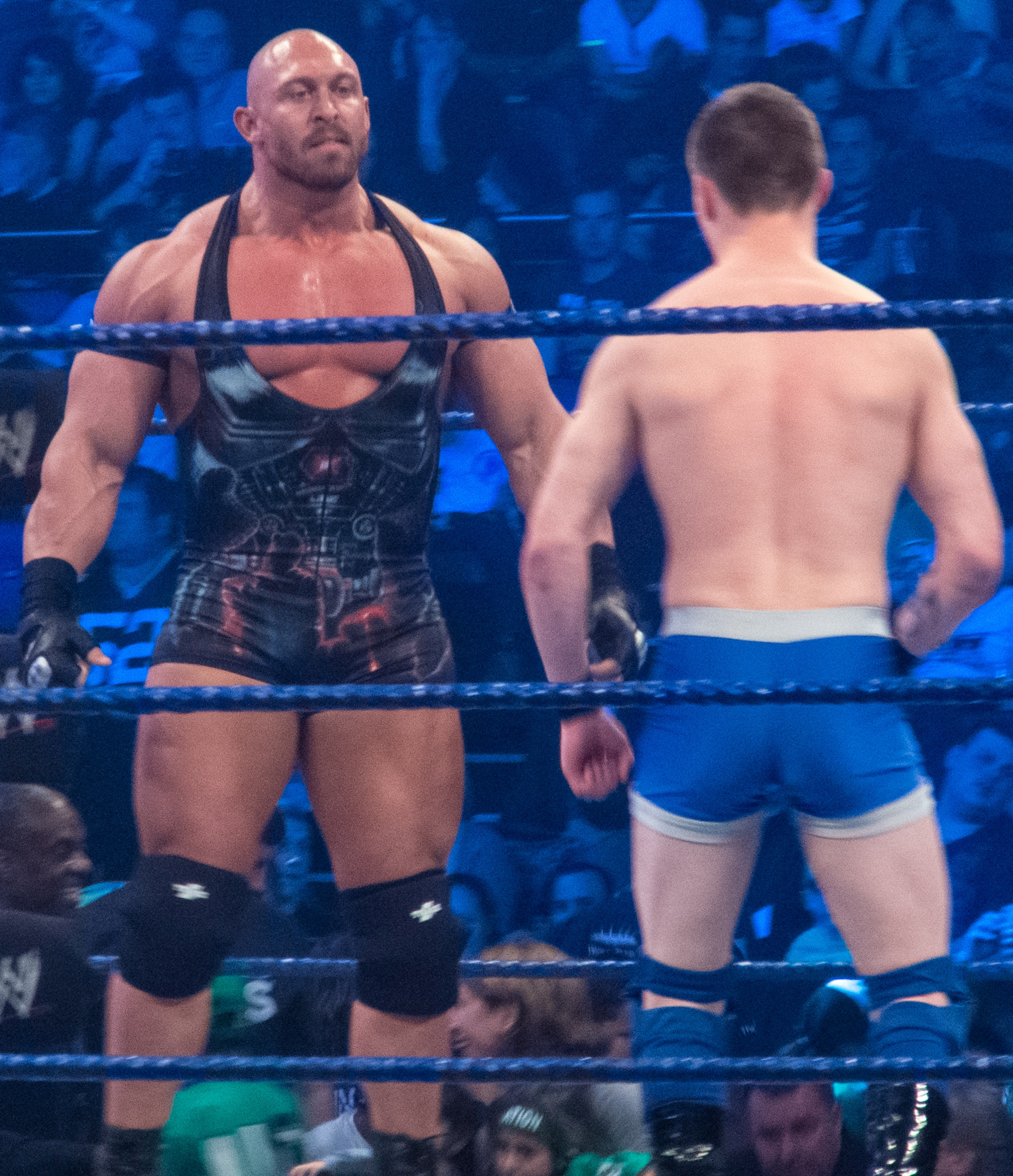
Upon his return to the main roster in 2012, Reeves was repackaged as Ryback, and he went undefeated throughout the year.

Reeves returned to television on the April 6, 2012, episode of WWE SmackDown, under the Ryback ring name as a face. He would embark on a thirty eight-match winning streak, mainly consisting of squash matches against numerous enhancement talent until his match against CM Punk for the WWE Championship Hell in a Cell in October 2012, where he lost after a controversial pin by referee Brad Maddox. He failed to capture the title twice more from Punk, first at Survivor Series, and then on the January 7, 2013 episode of Raw, both times being interfered and attacked by The Shield (Dean Ambrose, Roman Reigns and Seth Rollins).

On January 27 at the Royal Rumble, Ryback entered the Royal Rumble match as the thirtieth and final entrant and eliminated five superstars before being the last man eliminated by John Cena. Ryback would then resume his rivalry with The Shield on the February 4 Raw, when he teamed up with John Cena and Sheamus to attack the stable. This culminated in a six-man tag team match on February 17 at Elimination Chamber, where The Shield emerged victorious when Seth Rollins pinned Ryback for the win following a Spear from Roman Reigns. The following night on Raw, Ryback and Sheamus teamed up with Chris Jericho to face The Shield in a rematch, but were again defeated. Ryback then began a feud with Mark Henry after several non-verbal confrontations led to them attacking Drew McIntyre with their finishing moves in an attempt to one-up each other. On the March 15 episode of SmackDown, Ryback defeated Henry by disqualification following interference from The Shield. Afterwards, Henry delivered the World's Strongest Slam to Ryback three times in a row. Ryback and Henry competed in a Bench Press Challenge on the March 29 SmackDown, where Ryback tied Henry at 53 reps after Henry choked him with the weight. On April 7 at WrestleMania 29, Ryback was defeated by Henry in a singles match.

The following night on Raw, Ryback saved WWE Champion John Cena from assault by Mark Henry before attacking Cena as well, turning heel in the process. The following week on Raw, Ryback explained his attack on Cena as stepping out from his shadow and getting revenge for Cena not having his back against The Shield; before Ryback got a measure of revenge later that night, by allowing the Shield to attack Cena. After becoming the number one contender for the WWE Championship, Ryback continued his feud with Cena by attacking him on several occasions while also having confrontations with The Shield. Ryback received his title opportunity in a Last Man Standing match on May 19 at Extreme Rules. The match ended in a no contest after Ryback rammed Cena and himself into the electric backdrop at the top of the ramp. The following night on Raw, Ryback entered the arena in an ambulance and challenged Cena to an ambulance match for the WWE Championship at the first-ever Payback pay-per-view. The following week on the May 27 episode of Raw, Cena accepted Ryback's challenge, but announced their match would instead be a 3 Stages of Hell match; the first fall a lumberjack match, the second a tables match, and the third an ambulance match. On June 16 at Payback, Ryback won the lumberjack match, but went on to lose both the tables and ambulance matches and his shot at the WWE Championship, to end the feud.

==== RybAxel (2013–2014) ====
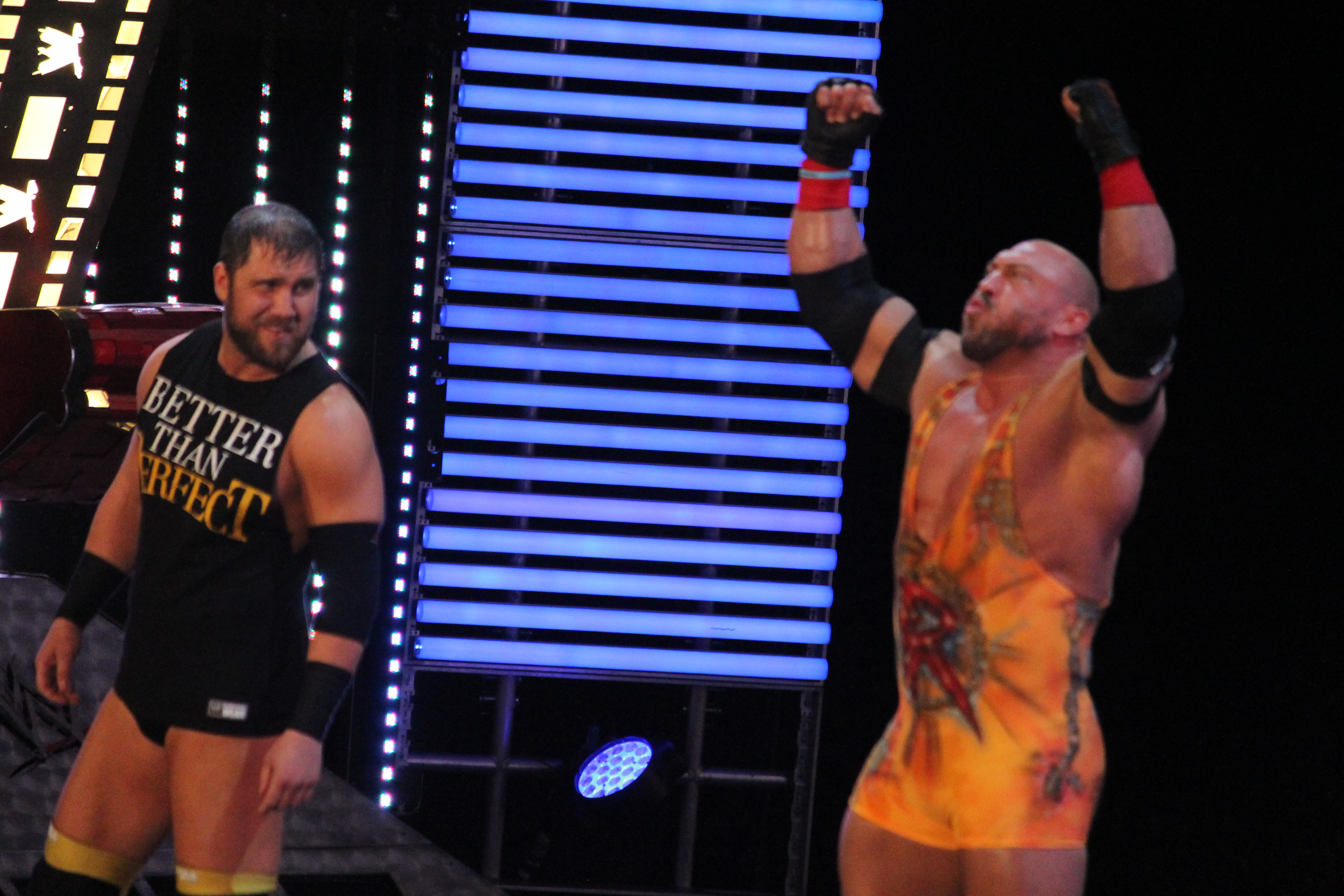
Ryback (right) and his tag team partner Curtis Axel in April 2014

Ryback then began feuding with Chris Jericho, which led to a singles match on July 14 at Money in the Bank, where Ryback emerged victorious. In August, Ryback debuted a new gimmick, where he began bullying various backstage workers. Also as part of the gimmick, Ryback would back away from fighting opponents of equal size and taking advantage of smaller and vulnerable opponents.

On September 15 at Night of Champions, Ryback aligned himself with Paul Heyman after helping him defeat CM Punk. Despite being a bully himself, Ryback claimed he hated bullies and vowed to stop CM Punk and anyone else who acted as such. On October 6 at Battleground, Ryback was defeated by Punk in a singles match following a low blow from Punk. On October 27 at Hell in a Cell, Ryback and Heyman were defeated by Punk in a 2-on-1 handicap Hell in a Cell match. The feud ended the following night on Raw, when Punk defeated Ryback in a Street Fight match after forcing him to submit to the Anaconda Vise, marking Ryback's first ever submission loss. On the November 11 episode of Raw, the alliance between Ryback and Heyman came to an end when Heyman verbally berated him. On November 24 at Survivor Series, Ryback was defeated by the returning Mark Henry after he answered Ryback's open challenge.

Ryback then began a tag team with fellow former Paul Heyman Guy Curtis Axel collectively labelled as "RybAxel", and on the December 6 episode of SmackDown, they defeated WWE Tag Team Champions Cody Rhodes and Goldust in a non-title match to earn a shot at the titles. RybAxel received their title shot on December 15 at TLC: Tables, Ladders & Chairs, but were defeated by Cody Rhodes and Goldust in a four-way elimination match, also involving Big Show and Rey Mysterio and The Real Americans (Antonio Cesaro and Jack Swagger). RybAxel received another shot at the WWE Tag Team Championship on April 6, 2014, on the WrestleMania XXX pre-show, but were defeated by defending champions The Usos in a fatal four-way elimination match, which also included Los Matadores and The Real Americans. At Payback, RybAxel defeated Cody Rhodes and Goldust in a tag team match. At Money in the Bank, RybAxel lost to Gold and Stardust. On July 2, it was announced that Ryback and Axel would be competing for the vacant Intercontinental Championship in a 19-man battle royal at Battleground, but neither Ryback or Axel managed to win. On August 26, 2014, Ryback underwent hernia surgery.

==== Intercontinental Champion (2014–2015) ====
After a two-month injury, Ryback returned on the October 27 episode of Raw as a babyface, returning to his old "Feed Me More" gimmick by defeating Bo Dallas. Ryback would later end his association with Axel on the November 6 episode of Superstars. Four days later on the November 10 episode of Raw, Ryback appeared to join Team Authority for Survivor Series after attacking John Cena, but attacked his supposed teammates after they interfered in his match against Cena, joining Team Cena the following week. Ryback was eliminated by Rusev, but Team Cena won the match, putting The Authority out of power. Ryback defeated Team Authority member Kane in a Chairs match at TLC. After Seth Rollins coaxed Cena to bring The Authority back into power, Ryback, along with Erick Rowan and Dolph Ziggler, were (kayfabe) fired by Triple H on the January 5 episode of Raw as punishment for insubordination, but they were re-hired after Cena defeated Rollins, Kane and Big Show in a handicap match due to the distraction caused by Sting, on the January 19 episode of Raw. On the January 22 episode of SmackDown, Ryback defeated Rusev via count-out to earn a spot in the Royal Rumble match, where he was eliminated by Big Show and Kane. At Fastlane, he teamed with Rowan and Ziggler in a six-man tag team match against Rollins, Big Show and Kane, but lost. Ryback participated in the André the Giant Memorial Battle Royal at WrestleMania 31, but was eliminated by the eventual winner, Big Show. On the Raw following Extreme Rules, Ryback was attacked by Bray Wyatt (who sent a series of mysterious promos aimed at Ryback weeks prior), leading to a match at Payback, which Ryback lost.

At Elimination Chamber, Ryback won the vacant Intercontinental Championship, his first professional wrestling championship in WWE, by defeating Sheamus, Dolph Ziggler, R-Truth, King Barrett and Mark Henry in an Elimination Chamber match. The following night, before Ryback was scheduled to make his first title defense against The Miz; Big Show attacked Miz and confronted Ryback, starting a feud between the two. At Money in the Bank, Big Show defeated Ryback by disqualification after Miz attacked him; Ryback retained the title as a result. Ryback was scheduled to defend the title against Big Show and Miz in a triple threat match at Battleground, but the match was postponed after Ryback developed a staph infection in his knee; the match was rescheduled for SummerSlam, where Ryback pinned The Miz to retain the title. Ryback once again defended his championship against Big Show on the August 31 episode of Raw, where he pinned Show after a distraction from The Miz, ending the feud. On the September 11 episode of SmackDown, Kevin Owens, who was one of the lumberjacks, cost him a win against Seth Rollins. Three days later on the September 14 episode of Raw, it was announced that he would face Owens at Night of Champions for his Intercontinental Championship. Owens won the match by pinfall after he raked Ryback's eyes, ending his reign at 112 days. After initially failing to regain the title using his rematch clause after Owens proceeded to get himself counted out, Ryback defeated Rusev to earn another opportunity at Hell in a Cell, where Ryback failed to regain the championship from Owens, ending the feud.

==== Final feuds and departure (2015–2016) ====
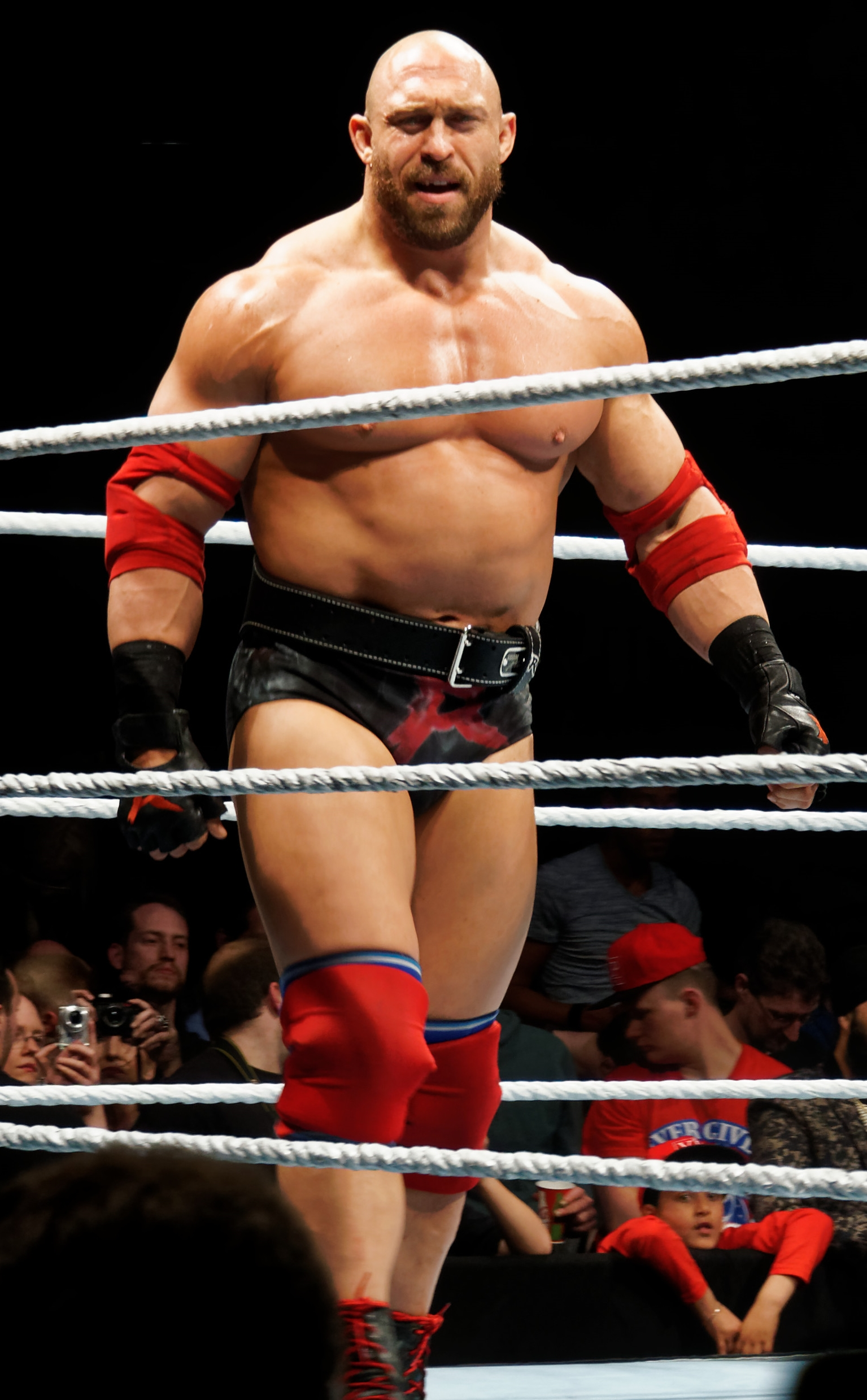
Ryback debuted a new look, abandoning his singlet in 2016

On the November 12 episode of SmackDown, Ryback would enter the 16-man tournament to crown the new WWE World Heavyweight Champion, but he would lose to Kalisto in the first round. At Survivor Series, Ryback participated in a five-on-five elimination tag team match, teaming with The Usos and The Lucha Dragons to defeat The New Day, Sheamus and King Barrett. In December, Ryback started a feud with Rusev after interrupting Rusev and the returning Lana on Miz TV, which would lead to a match between the two at TLC, where Ryback was defeated by Rusev by technical knockout. On January 24, 2016, Ryback competed in the Royal Rumble match for the WWE World Heavyweight Championship as the ninth entrant, but was eliminated by Big Show.

On the February 4 episode of SmackDown, Ryback debuted a new look, abandoning his singlet and now sporting black trunks, where he defeated Erick Rowan, but was attacked by The Wyatt Family. Ryback teamed up with Big Show and Kane, being billed as "the titans" of WWE, to defeat Wyatt Family members Erick Rowan, Luke Harper and Braun Strowman in a six-man tag team match at Fastlane, with Ryback pinning Harper for the victory. The next night on Raw, during a rematch between the two teams, Ryback walked out on Big Show and Kane, and later proclaimed that he was tired of being in tag team matches, turning heel for the first time since 2014.

On the March 7 episode of Raw, Ryback confronted United States Champion Kalisto backstage, leading to a title match between the two on the WrestleMania 32 pre-show, which Ryback lost. In a non-title rematch between the two on the April 21 episode of SmackDown, Ryback defeated Kalisto to reignite their feud. With the win, he earned another shot at Kalisto's United States Championship at the Payback pre-show, but was again defeated; this marked his final appearance in WWE.

On May 2, it was reported that WWE had sent Ryback home from television due to a contract dispute, and he did not participate in the battle royal match for which he was scheduled. The following day, he explained on his Tumblr page that he had made the decision to go home, citing a lack of equal pay for talent and creative frustration as primary reasons for his departure.

On August 5, Reeves announced via Instagram that he and WWE had parted ways, though he was not officially released until August 8.

=== Independent circuit (2016–2018) ===
Immediately after his WWE departure, Ryback began taking independent bookings. He wrestled between August 2016 and August 2018.

== Persona and reception ==
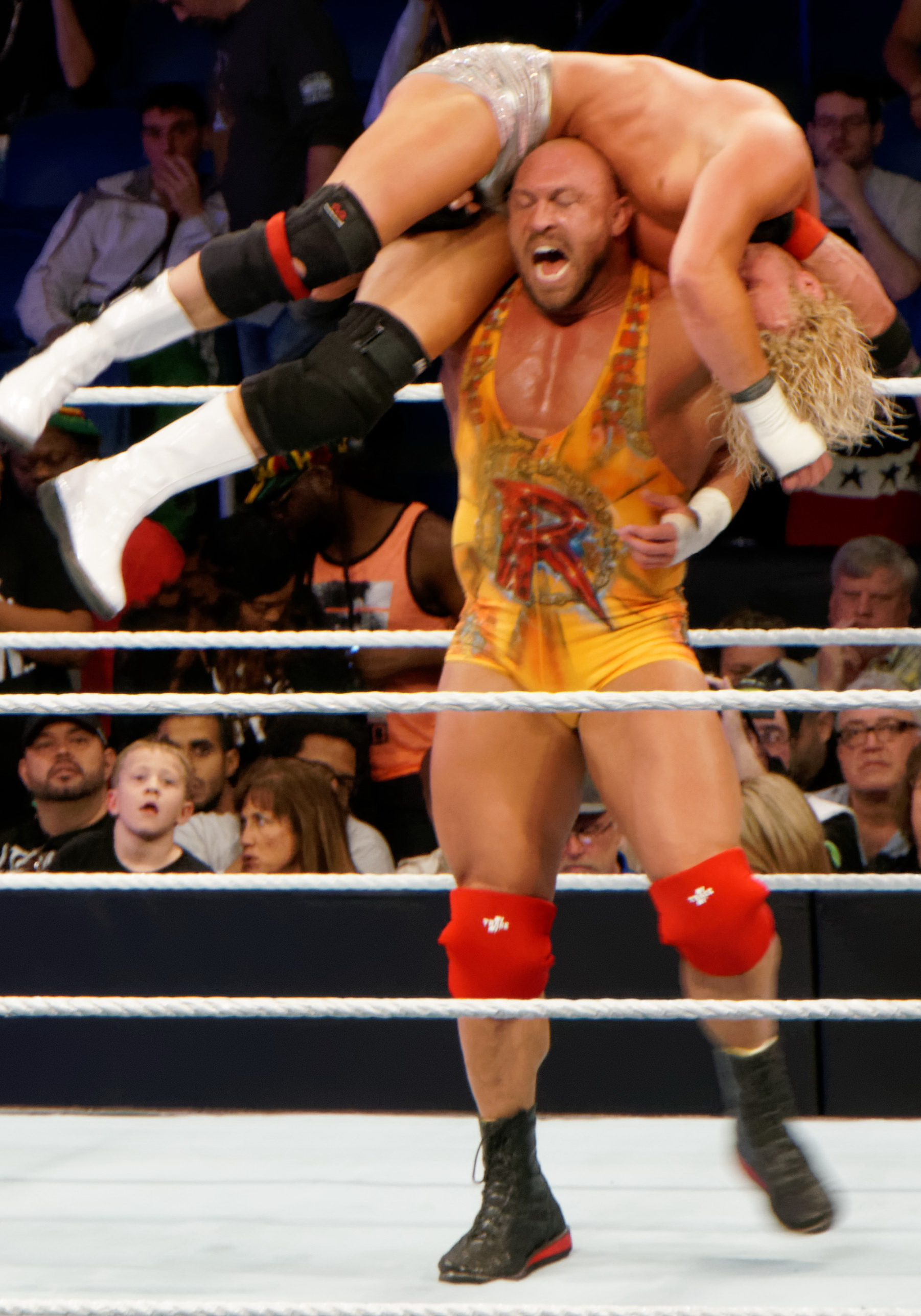
Ryback performing his finishing move, the Shell-Shock (a cradle suplex into a running horizontal muscle buster) on Dolph Ziggler

The Ryback character has been described as "Goldberg meets The Ultimate Warrior meets Rob Van Dam's tights". Owing to similarities between him and Goldberg, the portmanteau of "Ryberg" was devised for Reeves. In October 2012, after Reeves allegedly "stole" a move used by Goldberg during a match, Goldberg would respond by stating, "now comparisons offend me". Spectators at WWE events had been chanting "Goldberg" during Reeves' matches from 2012, which Reeves said "never bothered [him]". In response to podcast host and mixed martial artist Chael Sonnen's confusion about Ryback's appeal in late 2014, former WWE writer Jon Piermarini noted that the creative staff were doing "essentially the exact same thing they did with the character when it did not work or catch on the first time" and would only continue to get Goldberg's character over as Ryback.

Reeves has garnered praise from peers such as Wade Barrett, who called himself "a huge fan of Ryback". WWE Hall of Famer Mick Foley said Ryback "had been doing a great job" in his solo promos, and that Ryback's first verbal interaction opposite Foley in 2013 "went really well".

Reeves's in-ring work as Ryback has been criticized by some writers and fans since 2012, when IGN reporter Matt Fowler described Reeves as "green", "unsafe", and lacking in stamina. This was after Reeves botched his Shell Shocked (a cradle suplex lifted and dropped into a running horizontal muscle buster) finishing move multiple times on Tensai on the October 1 episode of Raw, which was described by an IB Times writer as "hard to watch". Reeves later attributed the error to sickness and improper technique on his part. Readers of the Wrestling Observer Newsletter voted Ryback the "Most Overrated" wrestler in the publication's 2012 awards, and WWE live crowds went on to chant "You can't wrestle" at Reeves in 2013. On the other hand, Jon Piermarini felt that Reeves had the potential to be successful under a new gimmick, stating: "I see a lot of good qualities and I see someone who can talk, I see someone that could be different and stand out... I think that there's something there".

According to Mike Johnson of PWInsider, Dolph Ziggler received a concussion from a stiff clothesline by Reeves in a January 2014 match, with Johnson reporting that this damaged Reeves's reputation among peers along with ongoing complaints of his recklessness – a reason why his recent pushes were aborted. In November 2014, CM Punk labelled Reeves as a "steroid guy" and said that wrestling him "took 20 years off" his life, while also claiming that Reeves purposely broke his ribs. Reeves denied the notion that he is a hazardous wrestler, and claimed that he would not be placed in matches with top WWE stars if he were as unsafe as some have claimed. Veteran wrestler Chris Jericho also dismissed the allegations of dangerous in-ring performance directed at Reeves, saying: "Having worked with [him], I've never seen those types of things... it was always fun". Former WWE producer Arn Anderson said he never "had an issue working with him on matches or anything. He was always very, very easy to work with".

Former World Champion Mark Henry said of Reeves's reputation: "A lot of his peers look at him as difficult. A lot of his peers looked at him as dangerous." He also expressed displeasure with Reeves "talk[ing] shit" about the industry (including once labelling it "fake"), which Henry said had drawn the ire of many other wrestlers besides himself.

In 2016, he petitioned the Clark County, Nevada court to change his legal name to "Ryback Allen Reeves", citing the ring name as a brand he created and wished to retain control over.

== Other media ==
=== Video games ===
Video game appearances
Year	Title	Notes
2012	WWE '13	Video game debut. Downloadable content
2013	WWE 2K14	
2014	WWE 2K15	
2015	WWE 2K16	

== Championships and accomplishments ==
- Heroes and Legends Wrestling
  - HLW Heavyweight Championship (1 time)
- Ohio Valley Wrestling
  - OVW Heavyweight Championship (1 time)
- Pro Wrestling Illustrated
  - Feud of the Year (2010) The Nexus vs. WWE
  - Most Hated Wrestler of the Year (2010) As part of The Nexus
  - Most Improved Wrestler of the Year (2012)
  - Ranked No. 13 of the top 500 wrestlers in the PWI 500 in 2013
- Rock And Roll Wrestling
  - RRW World Championship (1 time)
- Rolling Stone
  - Most Improved Promos (2015)
- World Wrestling Entertainment/WWE
  - WWE Intercontinental Championship (1 time)
  - Slammy Award (5 times)
    - Crowd Chant of the Year (2012) Feed Me More!
    - Match of the Year (2014) – Team Cena vs. Team Authority at Survivor Series
    - Newcomer of the Year (2012)
    - Shocker of the Year (2010) The debut of The Nexus
    - Trending Now (2012) #FeedMeMore
- WrestlePro
  - WrestlePro Tag Team Championship (1 time) – with Pat Buck
- Wrestling Observer Newsletter
  - Most Overrated (2012)
