= Survivor Series (2014) =

WWE pay-per-view and livestreaming event

- Promotional poster featuring Seth Rollins
- Promotion: WWE
- Date: November 23, 2014
- City: St. Louis, Missouri
- Venue: Scottrade Center
- Attendance: 12,000
- Buy rate: 100,000 (excluding WWE Network views)

WWE event chronology
← Previous; Hell in a Cell	Next → NXT TakeOver: R Evolution

Survivor Series chronology
← Previous; 2013	Next → 2015

The 2014 Survivor Series was a professional wrestling pay-per-view (PPV) and livestreaming event produced by WWE. It was the 28th annual Survivor Series and took place on November 23, 2014, at the Scottrade Center in St. Louis, Missouri. The event centered on the Survivor Series match, a tag team elimination match that pits teams of multiple wrestlers against each other.

Eight matches were contested at the event, including two on the Kickoff pre-show. Two Survivor Series matches were held, including the main event which saw Team Cena (John Cena, Dolph Ziggler, Erick Rowan, Big Show, and Ryback) defeat Team Authority (Seth Rollins, Kane, Luke Harper, Mark Henry, and Rusev), with Ziggler emerging the lone survivor of his team after eliminating Kane, Harper, and lastly Rollins. The event was notable for featuring the WWE debut appearance of former World Championship Wrestling wrestler Sting, who helped Ziggler secure the win for Team Cena. As a result of the win, The Authority (Triple H, Stephanie McMahon, and Kane) were removed from power; had Team Cena lost, all of Team Cena (except Cena himself) would have been fired (in kayfabe).

This was the first Survivor Series to livestream on the WWE Network, which launched in February. The event had 100,000 pay-per-view buys (excluding WWE Network views), down from the previous year's 177,000 buys. This was the first Survivor Series since 2001 to not feature a world championship match. This was the second Survivor Series at the Scottrade Center, after the 1998 event when it was known as the Kiel Center.

== Production ==
=== Background ===
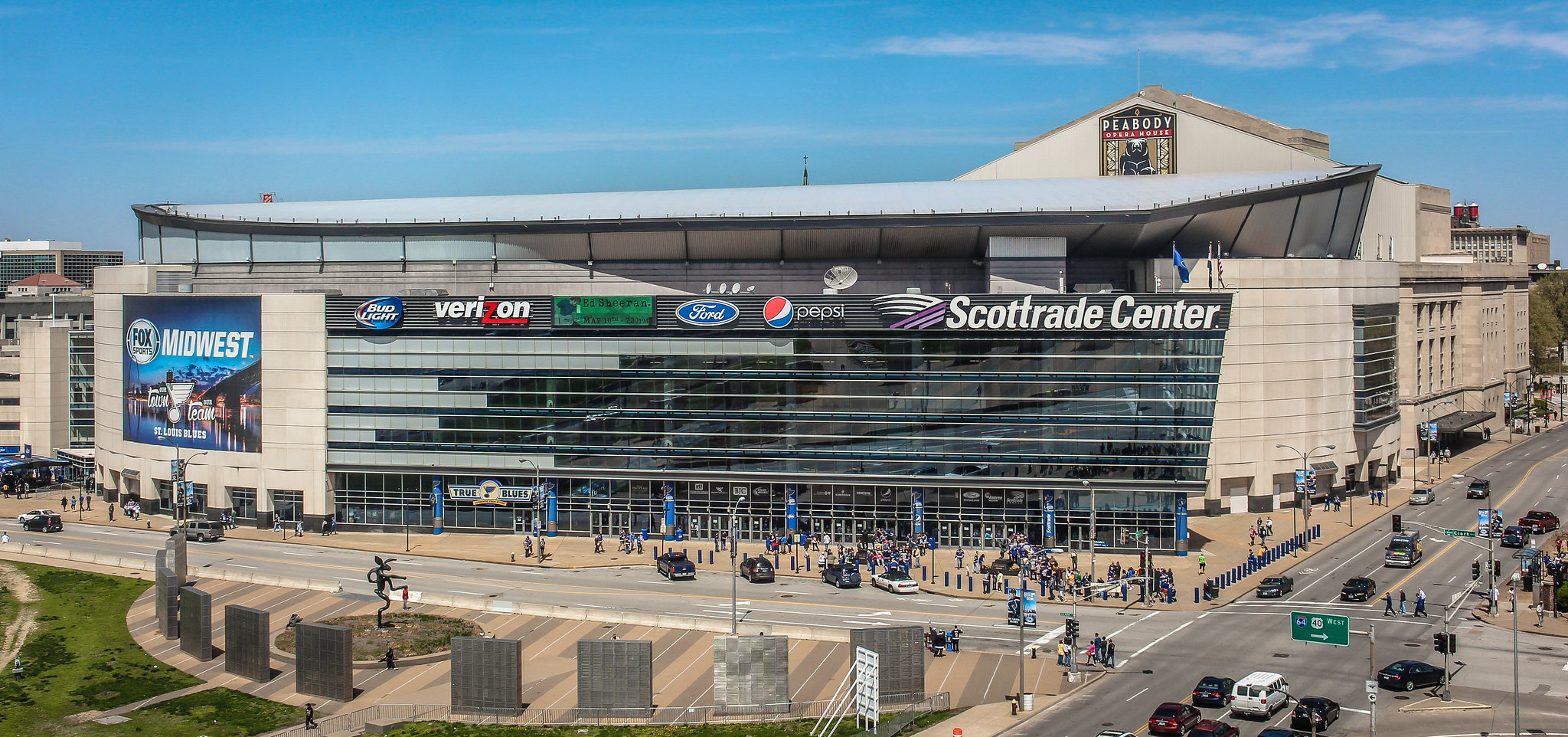
The 28th annual Survivor Series was the second time for the event to be held at the Scottrade Center in St. Louis, Missouri, after 1998 when it was known as the Kiel Center.

Survivor Series is an annual professional wrestling pay-per-view (PPV) event, produced every November by WWE since 1987, generally held around Thanksgiving in the United States. In what has become the second longest-running pay-per-view event in history (behind WWE's WrestleMania), it is one of the promotion's original four pay-per-views, along with WrestleMania, SummerSlam, and Royal Rumble, referred to as the "Big Four". The event is traditionally characterized by having Survivor Series matches, which are tag team elimination matches that typically pits teams of four or five wrestlers against each other. Announced on April 28, 2014, the 28th Survivor Series was scheduled to be held on November 23, 2014, at the Scottrade Center in St. Louis, Missouri, which was the second time at the venue, after the 1998 event when it was known as the Kiel Center. Tickets went on sale on August 23. In addition to airing on traditional pay-per-view, it was the first Survivor Series to livestream on the WWE Network, which launched in February.

=== Storylines ===
The event comprised eight matches, including two on the Kickoff pre-show, that resulted from scripted storylines. Results were predetermined by WWE's writers, while storylines were produced on WWE's weekly television shows, Raw and SmackDown.

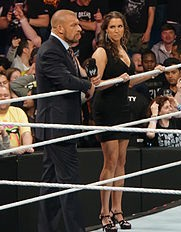
Triple H and Stephanie McMahon created The Authority.

On the October 27 episode of Raw, after John Cena, the #1 contender for the WWE World Heavyweight Championship, rejected an offer to join The Authority, Triple H scheduled a traditional Survivor Series tag team elimination match, with a team representing The Authority facing a team captained by Cena. Later that night, it was hinted that Intercontinental Champion Dolph Ziggler had joined Team Cena; both Cena and Ziggler saved each other from post-match attacks. The next week on Raw, Vince McMahon announced that if Team Authority loses at Survivor Series, The Authority would be out of power (Triple H would be fired as COO, Kane would be fired as Director of Operations, and Stephanie McMahon would no longer be a Principal Owner of WWE). Seth Rollins, Kane and Randy Orton joined Team Authority with Rollins as captain, while Ziggler joined Team Cena. Later that night, Orton was ejected by The Authority after he attacked members of The Authority, and turned face in the process for the first time since 2013. The next week on Raw, Rusev joined Team Authority after The Authority helped him retain the United States Championship from Sheamus. Sheamus joined Team Cena along with Big Show and Jack Swagger, while Mark Henry and Ryback joined Team Authority. But, by the end of the night, Swagger dropped out of Team Cena after Rollins injured him, while Ryback attacked and left Team Authority after Kane interfered in his main-event match against Cena. Luke Harper applied to join Team Authority by attacking Ziggler. The next week on Raw, Harper was confirmed as the final member of Team Authority. While Cena was scouting Ryback to fill out his team, team Authority attacked the rest of Team Cena, which played a part in Ziggler losing his Intercontinental Championship to Harper, and Sheamus dropping out of Team Cena after Mark Henry injured him. Later that night, Erick Rowan and Ryback joined Team Cena. On the November 21 episode of SmackDown, in response to comments made by Cena stating that he felt responsible for his team, Triple H announced that if Team Cena lost, all of Team Cena, except Cena himself, would be fired. Later that night, with Cena absent, Team Authority and a chair-wielding Triple H attacked the rest of Team Cena.

On the October 31 episode of SmackDown, Nikki Bella won a Battle Royal to face AJ Lee for the WWE Divas Championship. On November 10, WWE.com announced that AJ Lee would defend the title against Nikki at Survivor Series.

At Hell in a Cell, Bray Wyatt attacked and cost Dean Ambrose during his Hell in a Cell match against Seth Rollins. On the November 10 episode of Raw, it was announced that Ambrose would face Wyatt at Survivor Series.

On November 17, it was announced on WWE.com that Gold and Stardust would defend the WWE Tag Team Championship against The Miz and Damien Mizdow, The Usos (Jey Uso and Jimmy Uso), and Los Matadores (Diego and Fernando) (with El Torito) in a fatal four-way tag team match at Survivor Series.

On November 17, it was announced on WWE.com that the Survivor Series kickoff show would feature the return of Bad News Barrett from injury and Fandango, accompanied by Rosa Mendes, against an unknown opponent.

On November 18, it was announced on WWE.com that Alicia Fox, Natalya, Emma, and Naomi would face Paige, Cameron, Layla, and Summer Rae in a Survivor Series elimination tag team match at Survivor Series.

== Event ==
Other on-screen personnel
Role:	Name:
English commentators	Michael Cole
English commentators	Jerry Lawler
English commentators	John "Bradshaw" Layfield
Spanish commentators	Carlos Cabrera
Spanish commentators	Marcelo Rodriguez
Backstage interviewers	Tom Phillips
Backstage interviewers	Byron Saxton
Ring announcers	Lilian Garcia
Ring announcers	Eden Stiles
Referees	Mike Chioda
Referees	Darrick Moore
Referees	Chad Patton
Referees	Charles Robinson
Referees	Ryan Tran
Referees	Rod Zapata
Referees	Jason Ayers
Referees	Scott Armstrong
Pre-show panel	Renee Young
Pre-show panel	Booker T
Pre-show panel	Paul Heyman
Pre-show panel	Alex Riley

=== Pre-show ===
The analysis team was hosted by Renee Young and consisted of Alex Riley, Booker T, and special guest Paul Heyman.

During the Survivor Series Kickoff pre-show, Fandango faced Justin Gabriel. Fandango executed The Last Dance to win the match.

Later, Jack Swagger faced Cesaro. Swagger forced Cesaro to submit to the Patriot Lock to win the match.

=== Preliminary matches ===
The event began with Mr. McMahon calling The Authority and John Cena to the ring. He added the stipulation, that should Team Authority lose, the only person who can bring The Authority back to power would be Cena himself. Cena then responded by saying "there is no chance in hell" he would bring The Authority back to power.

The first match saw Gold and Stardust defend the Tag Team Championship against The Miz and Damien Mizdow, The Usos (Jey Uso and Jimmy Uso), and Los Matadores. After Goldust was incapacitated by a Samoan Splash from an Uso, Mizdow stole the pin to win the titles for his team.

Next, Team Natalya (Alicia Fox, Emma, Naomi, and Natalya) faced Team Paige (Paige, Cameron, Layla, and Summer Rae) in a traditional 4-on-4 Survivor Series elimination tag team match. Cameron was eliminated by Naomi after Naomi pinned her with a bridging rolling reverse cradle pin. Layla was eliminated by Fox after a tilt-a-whirl backbreaker. Summer Rae was eliminated after Emma forced her to submit to the Emma Lock. Paige was eliminated by Naomi after a handstand modified headscissors driver.

After that, Dean Ambrose faced Bray Wyatt. Ambrose was disqualified after he hit Wyatt with a chair. After the match, Ambrose attacked Wyatt with Dirty Deeds on the chair, a diving elbow drop through a table and buried Wyatt underneath a table and chairs and climbed a ladder. Later in the event, it was announced that Wyatt would face Ambrose in a tables, ladders, and chairs match at TLC: Tables, Ladders & Chairs.

In the fourth match, Adam Rose and The Bunny faced Slater-Gator (Heath Slater and Titus O'Neil). The Bunny executed a missile dropkick on Slater to win the match.

Next, Michael Cole, Jerry Lawler, and John "Bradshaw" Layfield interviewed Roman Reigns via satellite, who announced he would return in late December.

In the fifth match, AJ Lee defended the Divas Championship against Nikki Bella. After Brie Bella kissed AJ, Nikki executed the Rack Attack on AJ to win the title.

=== Main event ===
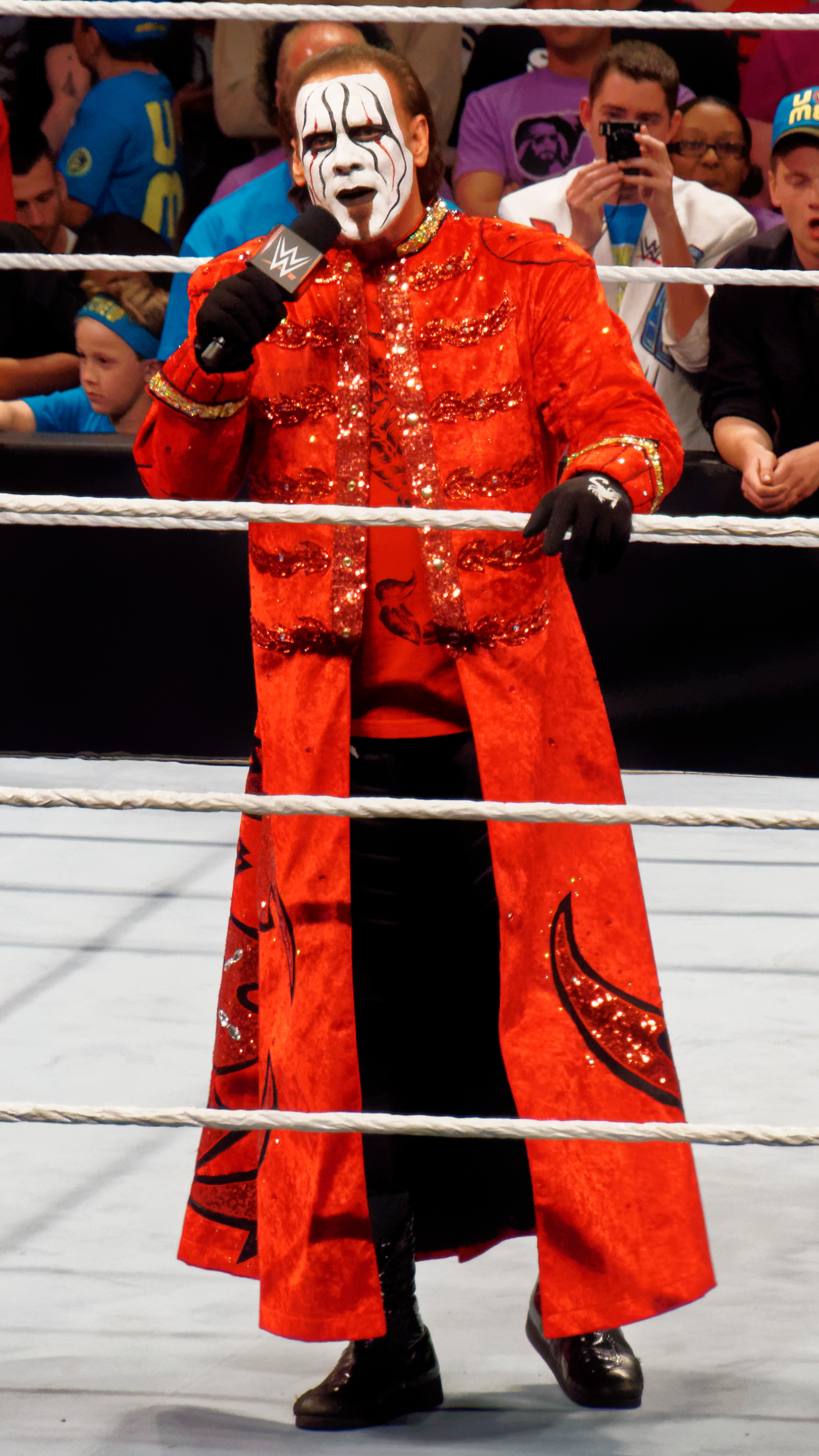
Former World Championship Wrestling wrestler Sting made his WWE debut during the main event.

In the main event, Team Cena (John Cena, Dolph Ziggler, Big Show, Erick Rowan, and Ryback) faced Team Authority (Seth Rollins, Kane, Mark Henry, Rusev, and Luke Harper) (with Triple H, Stephanie McMahon, Jamie Noble, Joey Mercury, and Lana) in a traditional 5-on-5 Survivor Series elimination tag team match. Henry was the first man eliminated by Big Show after a Knockout Punch. Ryback was eliminated by Rusev after a Curb Stomp from Rollins and a jumping savate kick. Rusev tried to put Ziggler through a broadcast table with a splash but missed, fell through the table and was counted out. Rowan was eliminated by Harper after a discus clothesline. Cena was eliminated by Rollins after a Knockout Punch from Big Show, who betrayed Team Cena by shaking Triple H's hand and walking out on the match, eliminating himself by countout and turning heel. Ziggler eliminated Kane with a Zig Zag and Harper with a schoolboy. Ziggler executed a Zig Zag on Rollins but Triple H pulled the referee out of the ring. The Authority attacked Ziggler, but he fought them off and executed a second Zig Zag on Rollins as another referee came out to the ring. Triple H attacked the other referee and attacked Ziggler, executing a Pedigree on him. He called out Scott Armstrong to count the pin, but WCW wrestler Sting appeared, making his WWE debut. Sting knocked out Armstrong and had a staredown with Triple H. Sting then executed a Scorpion Death Drop on Triple H and pulled Ziggler on top of Rollins for the pin and win. Per the pre-match stipulation, The Authority was removed from power. Triple H was fired as the COO, Stephanie was no longer a principal owner of WWE and Kane lost his role as the Director of Operations. The show ended with Triple H and Stephanie heartbroken that they lost their power, and they realized that they were nothing better than the people that clean the floors and they realized that since they were fired from power, they lost the privilege to fly on the corporate jet to WWE events, and they can only work at WWE headquarters and no longer influence the careers and lives of the superstars. The fans chanted "Yes! Yes! Yes!" and "You got fired!" Stephanie would throw a tantrum and not accept the results as she would cry as the event went off the air.

== Reception ==
Survivor Series received generally positive reviews, with particular praise going toward the main event, with highlights including Sting's debut and Ziggler's performance. Speaking of the Ambrose-Wyatt match, Larry Csonka of 411mania said "The match was good, and they set up next month so I really don't have a lot of complaints with this". He gave the match ***3/4 (out of *****). He gave the main event ****, calling it "a very good main event presentation". He gave the entire event a score of 7 out of 10. The main event received the Slammy Award for match of the year 2014.

== Aftermath ==
On the November 24 episode of Raw, Triple H and Stephanie McMahon bid farewell to WWE's fans, but were interrupted by Daniel Bryan, who returned and served as the general manager for both Raw and SmackDown that week, putting members of Team Authority in unfavorable situations. Mark Henry was put in a match against Ryback, which he lost quickly. Luke Harper defended his Intercontinental Championship against Dean Ambrose, which ended in a disqualification due to Harper pushing Ambrose into the referee. Kane was put into concessions for the night as Concessions Kane. Rusev and Lana were forced to speak out the Pledge of Allegiance or defend the United States Championship in a Battle Royal, which Rusev did successfully on SmackDown. Seth Rollins lost a 3-on-2 handicap match against John Cena and Dolph Ziggler, with J&J Security (Jamie Noble and Joey Mercury) chosen as his partners by fans poll. At the end of the show, it was announced that the Anonymous Raw General Manager would be returning the following week.

On the December 29 episode of Raw, after threatening to Curb Stomp guest host Edge (who had to retire due to multiple neck injuries that could leave him paralyzed), Rollins coaxed Cena into bringing back The Authority after just over a month of exile. The following week, The Authority rewarded Rollins by placing him in the WWE World Heavyweight Championship match at the Royal Rumble also involving Cena and defending champion Brock Lesnar. Also on that same show, the Authority also gave out pre-match stipulated consequences to Team Cena, which resulted in the firings of Ziggler, Erick Rowan, and Ryback. Later, on the January 19, 2015, episode, Cena defeated Rollins, Big Show, and Kane in a 3-on-1 handicap match (with his No. 1 contendership on the line) with the help of Sting, thus allowing Ziggler, Rowan, and Ryback to get their jobs back. On the January 22, 2015, episode SmackDown, Bryan welcomed Ziggler, Rowan, and Ryback to celebrate their return to WWE.

Later on the February 2, 2015, episode of Raw, Cena welcomed Ziggler, Rowan, and Ryback to celebrate their return to WWE and they were placed in matches by Stephanie McMahon respectively. The following week, Ziggler, Ryback, and Rowan came out and helped Bryan and Roman Reigns to defeat Rollins, Big Show, Kane, and J&J Security. On the February 16 episode, after Ziggler defeated Rollins via disqualification, he was attacked by Rollins and J&J Security, but Ryback, and Rowan came out and saved Ziggler. On the February 19 episode of SmackDown, after Rollins defeated Ziggler, the Authority attacked Ziggler, Ryback, and Rowan. Afterwards, it was announced that Ziggler, Ryback, and Rowan would face Rollins, Big Show, and Kane in a six man tag team match at Fastlane, which they lost. Ziggler, Ryback, and Rowan avenged their loss on the February 26 episode of SmackDown, defeating Rollins, Kane, and Big Show. The three would go their separate ways just before WrestleMania 31.

On the December 8 episode of Raw, AJ Lee invoked her rematch clause against Nikki Bella for the Divas Championship at TLC: Tables, Ladders & Chairs.

Dean Ambrose and Bray Wyatt's feud continued when they faced off in the next few matches such as the Miracle on 34th Street Fight. They later faced off in TLC: Tables, Ladders & Chairs in a non-titled TLC main event, which Wyatt ultimately won due to Ambrose getting hurt by the television monitor to himself before concluding their feud with only four televised matches later on.

== Results ==
No.	Results	Stipulations	Times
1^{P}	Fandango (with Rosa Mendes) defeated Justin Gabriel by pinfall	Singles match	3:15
2^{P}	Jack Swagger (with Zeb Colter) defeated Cesaro by submission	Singles match	5:34
3	Damien Mizdow and The Miz defeated Goldust and Stardust (c), Los Matadores (Diego and Fernando) (with El Torito), and The Usos (Jey Uso and Jimmy Uso) by pinfall	Fatal four-way tag team match for the WWE Tag Team Championship	15:25
4	Team Natalya (Natalya, Alicia Fox, Emma, and Naomi) (with Tyson Kidd) defeated Team Paige (Paige, Cameron, Layla, and Summer Rae)^{1}	4-on-4 Survivor Series match	14:35
5	Bray Wyatt defeated Dean Ambrose by disqualification	Singles match	14:00
6	Adam Rose and The Bunny defeated Slater-Gator (Heath Slater and Titus O'Neil) by pinfall	Tag team match	2:36
7	Nikki Bella (with Brie Bella) defeated AJ Lee (c) by pinfall	Singles match for the WWE Divas Championship	0:33
8	Team Cena (John Cena, Dolph Ziggler, Erick Rowan, Big Show, and Ryback) defeated Team Authority (Seth Rollins, Kane, Luke Harper, Mark Henry, and Rusev) (with Jamie Noble, Joey Mercury, Lana, Stephanie McMahon, and Triple H)^{2}	5-on-5 Survivor Series match Since Team Authority lost, The Authority was removed from power (Triple H was fired as Chief Operating Officer, Kane was fired as Director of Operations, and Stephanie McMahon was fired as one of the principal owners of WWE). Had Team Cena lost, all of Team Cena except Cena himself would have been fired.	43:05
(c) / – the champion(s) heading into the match; P / – the match was broadcast on the pre-show

=== Survivor Series matches ===
^1

Eliminated	Wrestler	Eliminated by	Team	Method	Times
1	Cameron	Naomi	Team Paige	Pinfall	6:12
2	Layla	Alicia Fox	Team Paige	Pinfall	9:29
3	Summer Rae	Emma	Team Paige	Submission	12:04
4	Paige	Naomi	Team Paige	Pinfall	14:35
Survivor(s):	Alicia Fox, Emma, Naomi, and Natalya (Team Natalya) (clean sweep)				14:35

^2

Eliminated	Wrestler	Eliminated by	Team	Method	Times
1	Mark Henry	Big Show	Team Authority	Pinfall	0:50
2	Ryback	Rusev	Team Cena	Pinfall	8:10
3	Rusev	N/A	Team Authority	Countout	21:00
4	Erick Rowan	Luke Harper	Team Cena	Pinfall	24:14
5	John Cena	Seth Rollins	Team Cena	Pinfall	25:11
6	Big Show	N/A	Team Cena	Countout	26:30
7	Kane	Dolph Ziggler	Team Authority	Pinfall	29:35
8	Luke Harper	Dolph Ziggler	Team Authority	Pinfall	31:35
9	Seth Rollins	Dolph Ziggler	Team Authority	Pinfall	43:05
Sole Survivor:	Dolph Ziggler (Team Cena)				43:05
