= Brodie Lee =

American professional wrestler (1979–2020)

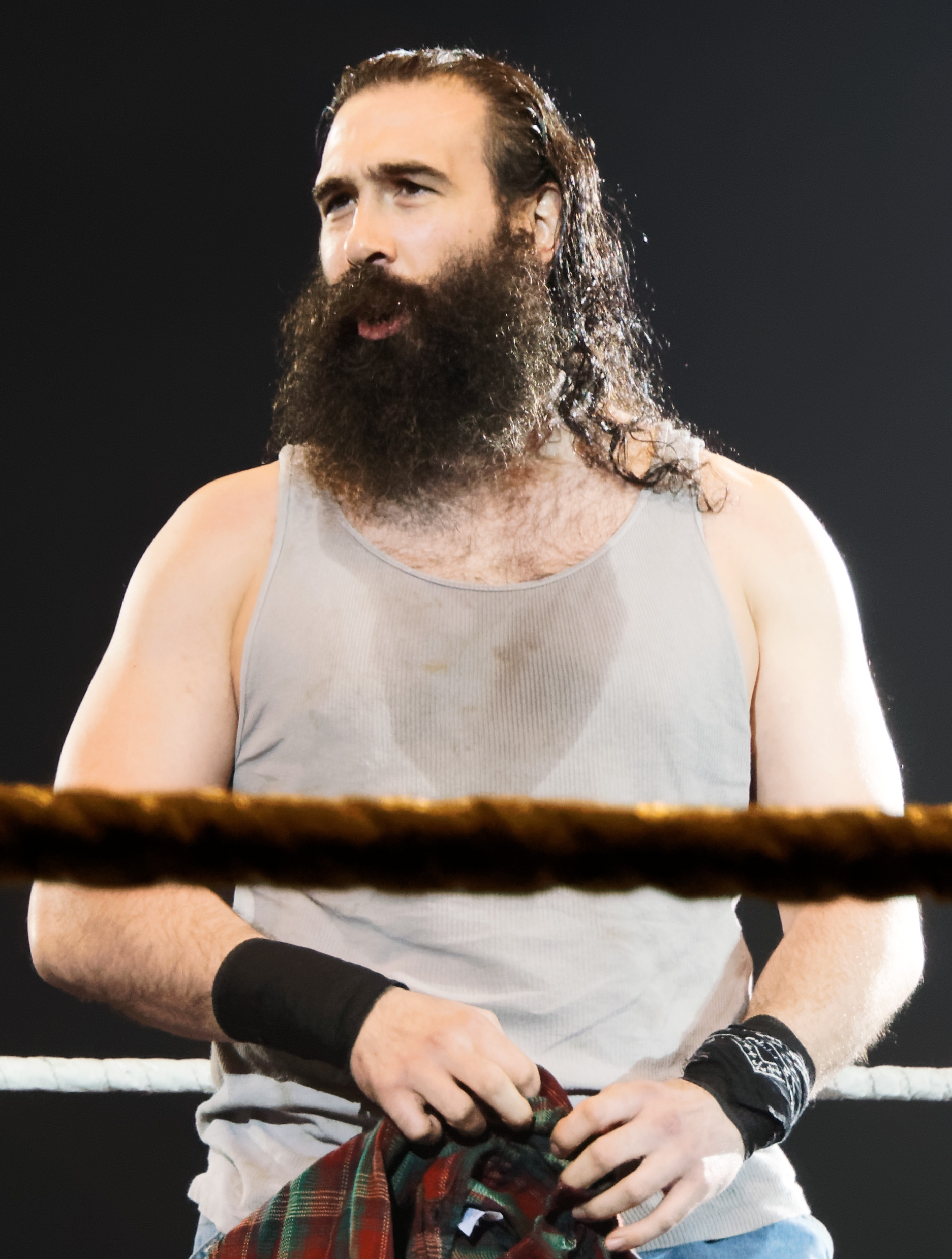
- Huber as Luke Harper in 2015

Personal information
- Born: Jonathan Huber; December 16, 1979 Rochester, New York, U.S.
- Died: December 26, 2020 (aged 41) Jacksonville, Florida, U.S.
- Cause of death: Idiopathic pulmonary fibrosis
- Spouse: Amanda Huber (m. 2011)
- Children: 2

Professional wrestling career
- Ring name(s): Brodie Lee; Harper; Huberboy #2; Jon Huber; Luke Harper; Mr. Brodie Lee
- Billed height: 6 ft 5 in (196 cm)
- Billed weight: 275 lb (125 kg)
- Billed from: Buffalo, New York; Butte, Montana; Lincoln, Nebraska; Rochester, New York
- Trained by: Kirby Marcos; Rik Matrix; Tony Mamaluke
- Debut: October 7, 2003

Jonathan Huber (December 16, 1979 – December 26, 2020), known professionally as Brodie Lee, was an American professional wrestler. He is best known for performing in WWE from 2012 to 2019 under the ring name Luke Harper, and briefly performing in All Elite Wrestling (AEW) in 2020 under the name Mr. Brodie Lee.

From 2003 to 2012, Huber performed as Brodie Lee on the American independent circuit for promotions such as Chikara, CZW, Ring of Honor and Dragon Gate USA, as well as Dragon Gate Japan. Upon signing with WWE in 2012, he assumed the Luke Harper name and was sent to WWE's developmental territory in Florida Championship Wrestling (FCW) before debuting in NXT as a member of The Wyatt Family. For most of his WWE career, he was closely associated with Wyatt Family members Bray Wyatt and Erick Rowan. The Wyatt Family won the NXT Tag Team Championship and the WWE SmackDown Tag Team Championship. The team of Harper and Rowan, later known as The Bludgeon Brothers in one of their tag team runs, went on to hold the SmackDown Tag Team Championship once more. During a brief run as a singles competitor, Harper became a one-time WWE Intercontinental Champion.

Huber departed WWE in December 2019 and subsequently made his AEW debut in March 2020 as Mr. Brodie Lee, the leader of The Dark Order, and won the AEW TNT Championship in August of that year. He was hospitalized in October 2020 for idiopathic pulmonary fibrosis, from which he died on December 26 at the age of 41.

== Early life ==
Jonathan Huber was born in Rochester, New York, on December 16, 1979. He attended McQuaid Jesuit High School and played lacrosse for four years. He also played hockey in independent youth leagues.

== Professional wrestling career ==
=== Early career (2003–2006) ===
Huber first got into wrestling as a backyard wrestler, performing under the ring name Huberboy #2 with the likes of Colin Delaney and his real-life brother, Referee Rob Ryan (Chris Huber) and Jimmy Olsen. Huber was eventually formally trained by Kirby Marcos and Rik Matrix in Rochester, New York, and Tony Mamaluke in Schenectady, New York, and made his debut for Roc City Wrestling (RCW) in 2003, working under a mask as Huberboy #2. Later that year, he unmasked and began working as Brodie Lee for Rochester Pro Wrestling (RPW). He came up with the name Brodie Lee from the movie Mallrats by combining the names of actor Jason Lee and his character Brodie Bruce, though his style and appearance have also brought comparisons to Bruiser Brody, mistakenly thinking his ring name was derived from Bruiser. Throughout his time in RPW, which was later renamed to NWA Upstate and then again to NWA New York, Lee went on to win multiple championships including the heavyweight championship on three separate occasions, the tag team championship once and, after he won the television championship, he unified it with the Kayfabe Dojo Championship.

=== Chikara (2007–2012) ===
Huber made his debut for Philadelphia-based Chikara on March 24, 2007, at Time Will Prove Everything, using "The Right Stuff" Brodie Lee gimmick and losing to Equinox. Lee originally was not scheduled to wrestle at the event, but was instead visiting backstage with friends. However, when Reckless Youth no-showed the event, Chikara booker Mike Quackenbush offered Lee the chance to get in the ring. Lee returned to the company two months later, defeating Equinox in a rematch and starting a streak of not being pinned nor submitting that lasted for the rest of the year. In August, Lee aligned himself with the Olsen Twins (Colin and Jimmy) and adopted the nickname "Big Rig" and a more serious gimmick of a trucker. Lee and the Olsen Twins were scheduled to enter the 2008 King of Trios tournament as Team Dr. Keith, but after Colin signed a contract with World Wrestling Entertainment (WWE), the team was left one man short. While Retail Dragon substituted Colin, the team lost in the first round, so Lee turned on him while simultaneously ending his alliance with Jimmy Olsen in the process.

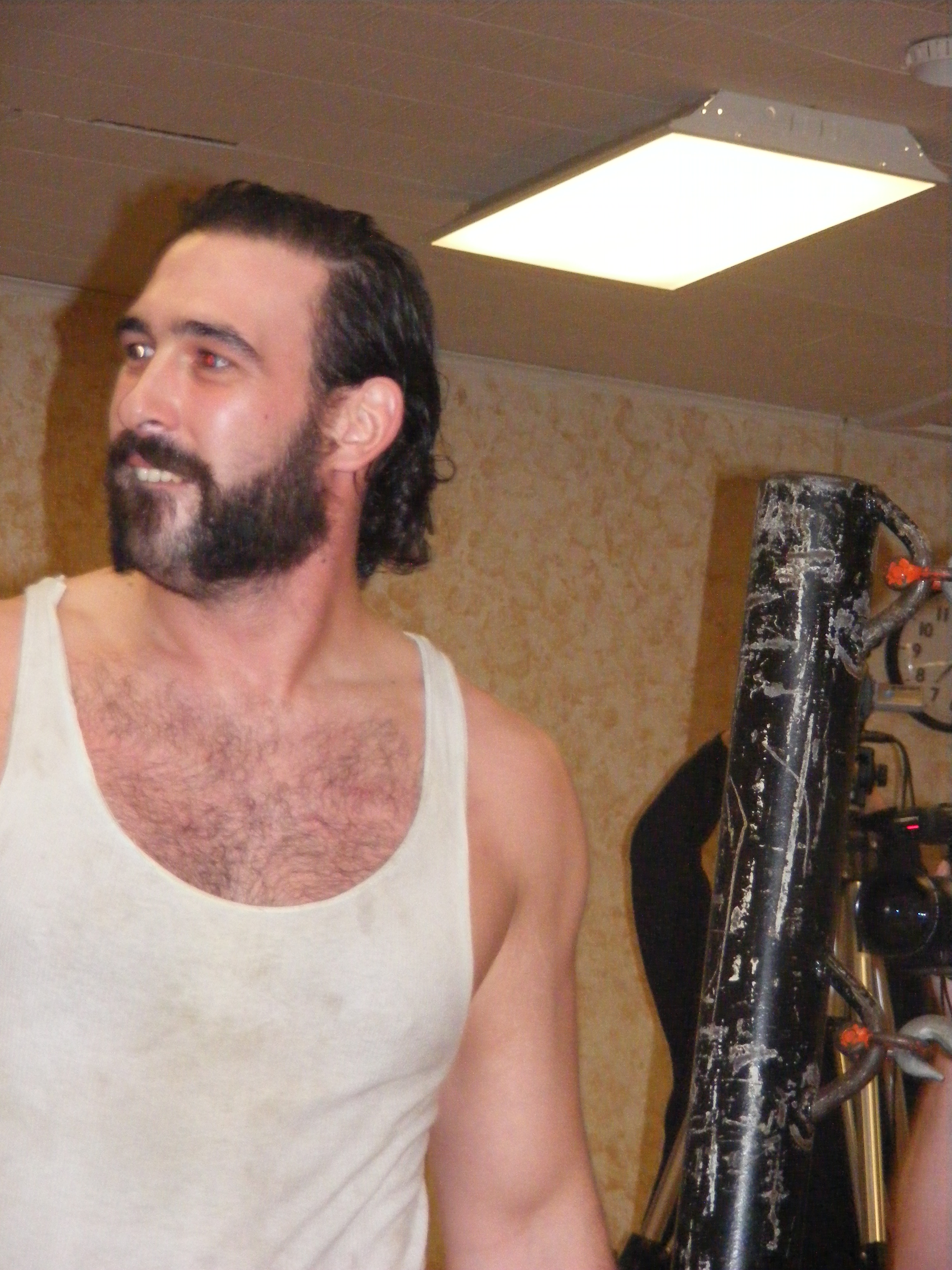
Lee at a Chikara event in November 2008

In April 2008, Lee's storyline where he bullied smaller wrestlers led to Claudio Castagnoli issuing a challenge to him. Their first match on April 20 ended in Castagnoli being disqualified for accidentally kicking the referee of the match. The second match on May 24 ended in similar fashion, this time Lee was disqualified for kicking the referee. This led to a no disqualification match on July 13, which Lee won after interference from Shayne Hawke and Mitch Ryder, both of whom had a grudge with Castagnoli for breaking up The Kings of Wrestling the previous year. Lee's and Castagnoli's feud ended on September 7, 2008, in Chikara's first-ever steel cage match, with Castagnoli coming out victorious.

In late 2008, Lee aligned himself with Eddie Kingston and Grizzly Redwood to form a stable called The Roughnecks. On February 21, 2009, The Roughnecks defeated UltraMantis Black, Crossbones and Sami Callihan to earn a spot in the 2009 King of Trios tournament. On March 27, The Roughnecks lost their King of Trios opening round match to Team Uppercut (Bryan Danielson, Claudio Castagnoli and Dave Taylor). When Kingston moved on to feuding with Castagnoli, Lee and Redwood began wrestling matches as a tag team. With victories over Los Ice Creams (El Hijo del Ice Cream and Ice Cream Jr.), Cheech Hernandez and K.C. Day, and the North Star Express (Darin Corbin and Ryan Cruz), Lee and Redwood earned their right to challenge for the Campeonatos de Parejas. On October 17, 2009, Lee and Redwood challenged The Colony (Fire Ant and Soldier Ant) for the championship, but were defeated in two straight falls. Lee opted to give Redwood one more chance, but when he dropped the fall on October 19 in a match against The Osirian Portal (Amasis and Ophidian), Lee kicked him in the face, effectively ending The Roughnecks. Redwood made his return six months later on April 24, 2010, as a surprise opponent of Lee's, but was easily defeated by him. Afterwards, Redwood stated that he was not done with Lee, but would prepare himself before their next match. On August 29, Lee entered the Countdown Showdown battle royal and was dominating the match, before being eliminated by Redwood. On October 23, Lee suffered an upset loss in a match against Dasher Hatfield, who was defeated by Redwood the following day. On November 20, Lee and Redwood, having earned each other's respect, re-united and attacked Hatfield after his match with Shayne "Buck" Hawke. On January 23, 2011, at the season ten premiere, The Roughnecks defeated The Throwbacks (Hatfield and Sugar Dunkerton) in a tag team match. The Roughnecks and The Throwbacks ended their feud on March 13 in a lumberjack match, where Hatfield and Dunkerton were victorious. In May 2011, Lee entered the 12 Large: Summit, set to determine the inaugural Chikara Grand Champion, but was forced to pull out of the tournament following his first match, after suffering a legitimate injury. Lee returned to Chikara on October 30. After signing a developmental contract with WWE, Lee made his farewell appearance for Chikara on March 25, 2012, when he unsuccessfully challenged Eddie Kingston for the Chikara Grand Championship.

=== Ring of Honor (2008–2009) ===
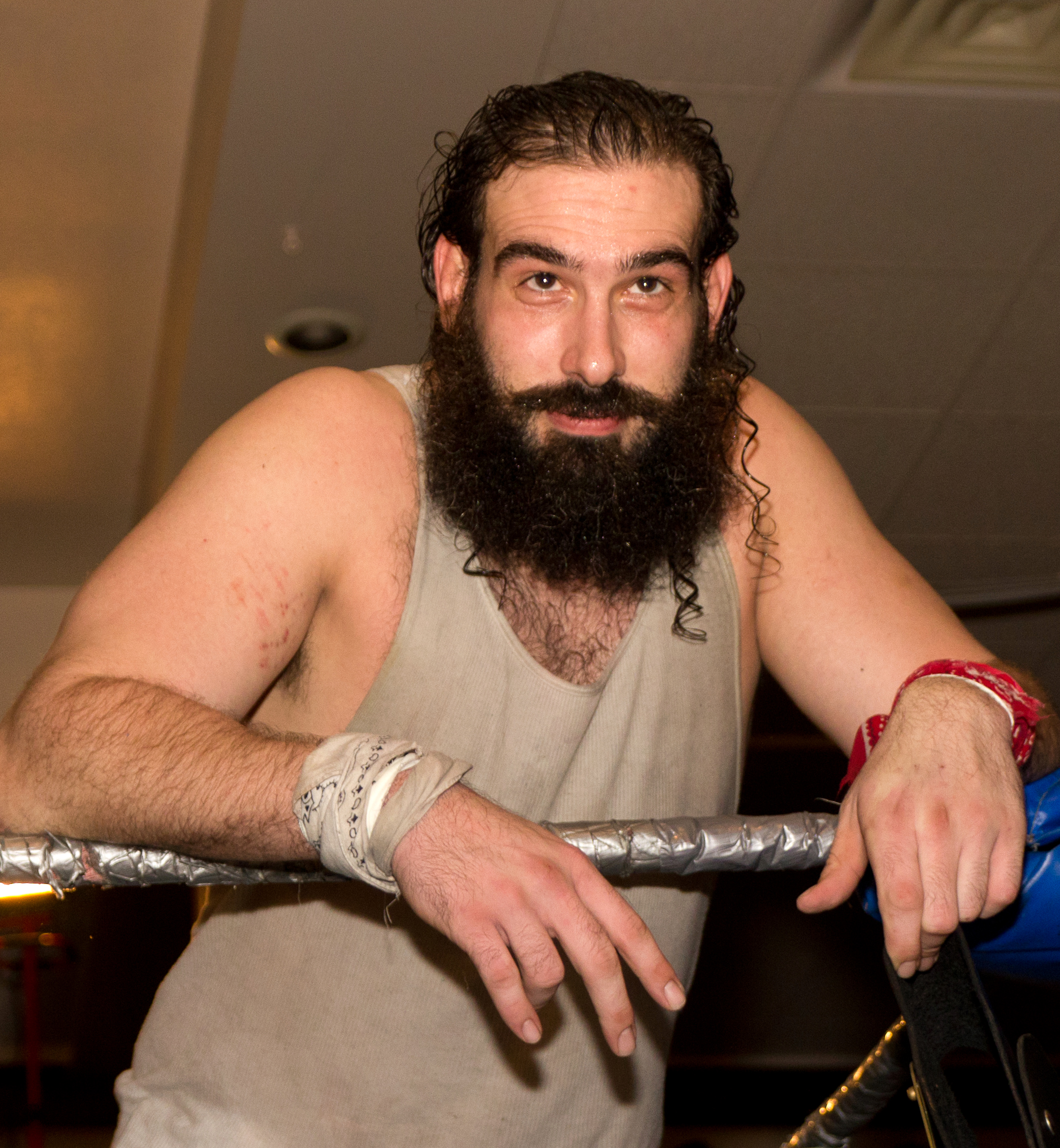
Brodie Lee in October 2011

Lee made his debut for Ring of Honor (ROH) on October 25, 2008, aligning himself with The Age of the Fall and helping the group's leader Jimmy Jacobs to defeat Austin Aries in an Anything Goes match. Lee then teamed with fellow Age of the Fall member Delirious and defeated Cheech and Cloudy in a tag team match, before ending the night by attacking Necro Butcher, with whom the stable was feuding, after his match with Go Shiozaki. On November 7, Lee's match with Necro Butcher ended in a disqualification, when the rest of The Age of the Fall attacked his opponent. Lee and Necro Butcher had a rematch under Anything Goes rules on February 27, 2009, which Necro won. In March, Delirious turned on The Age of the Fall and on May 30 he defeated Lee in his final ROH match.

=== Jersey All Pro Wrestling (2009–2011) ===
Lee made his debut for Jersey All Pro Wrestling (JAPW) on March 28, 2009, as a member of The Hillbilly Wrecking Crew, along with Necro Butcher and Trevor Murdoch. On August 1, Lee and Necro defeated the Garden State Gods (Corvis Fear and Myke Quest) to win the JAPW Tag Team Championship. On January 23, 2010, at JAPW's 12th Anniversary Show, Lee and Necro lost the title to Da Heavy Hitters (Havok and Monsta Mack) in a three-way tag team match, which also included The H8 Club (Nate Hatred and Nick Gage). On March 20, Lee got to challenge for the JAPW Heavyweight Championship, but was defeated by the defending champion Dan Maff and, after the match, Nick Gage attacked Maff and joined The Hillbilly Wrecking Crew, replacing Murdoch, who had left the company. On May 22, Lee and Necro faced Maff and the JAPW New Jersey State Champion Charlie Haas in a tag team match, where they put their JAPW careers on the line against the titles of their opponents. In the end, Lee managed to pin Haas, after Maff had turned on him, to become the new JAPW New Jersey State Champion. On October 23, 2010, Lee challenged Dan Maff for the JAPW Heavyweight Championship in a Champion vs. Champion match, but was defeated. On November 20, Lee first successfully defended the New Jersey State Championship against Eddie Kingston and then defeated Dan Maff, Nick Gage and Azrieal in a Championship Scramble to win the JAPW Heavyweight Championship for the first time, unifying the two titles. Lee made his first JAPW Heavyweight Championship defense on December 11, during the Anniversary weekend, defeating Rhino with help from Nick Gage. On December 30, 2011, JAPW announced that Lee, who had not made an appearance for the promotion in nine months, had been stripped of the JAPW Heavyweight Championship.

=== Evolve (2010–2011) ===
Lee debuted for Evolve on January 16, 2010, at the promotion's first ever show, teaming with Gran Akuma and Icarus in a six-man tag team match, where they were defeated by Team Frightning (Mike Quackenbush, Hallowicked and Frightmare). After losing a singles match to Gran Akuma on March 13, Lee picked up his first victory in the company by defeating Gran Akuma, Hallowicked and Chris Dickinson in a four-way match on May 1. At the fourth show on July 23, Lee wrestled Jon Moxley to a no contest. As Moxley was protesting the stoppage, Lee kicked a chair into his face, which led to Evolve suspending him for the show of September 11. Lee returned to Evolve on May 20, 2011, in a match where he was defeated by Sami Callihan via submission.

=== Dragon Gate USA and Dragon Gate (2010–2011) ===
On May 8, 2010, Lee made his debut for Dragon Gate USA (DGUSA), defeating Cheech, Cloudy, Kyle O'Reilly, Phil Atlas, Xtremo, Brent B. and Anthony Fiasco in a dark eight-way fray elimination match, before the tapings of the Uprising pay-per-view. Later, on the pay-per-view section of the evening, Lee interrupted a match between Rip Impact and Johnny Wave, beat down both of the competitors and stated that next time he would be coming after a Japanese wrestler. At the following event on September 25, Lee defeated Da Soul Touchaz (Acid Jaz, Marshe Rockett and Willie Richardson) in a three-on-one handicap match, before repeating his threat of going after a Japanese competitor. Later in the night, Lee set his sights on Yamato and chased him away from ringside, when he tried to interfere in a match between his ally Jon Moxley and Jimmy Jacobs. The following day, Lee defeated Jimmy Jacobs, Kyle O'Reilly, Mike Quackenbush, Rich Swann and Silas Young in a six-way match. On October 29 at Dragon Gate USA's first live pay-per-view, Bushido: Code of the Warrior, Lee teamed with sumo legend Akebono in a tag team match, where they defeated The Osirian Portal. After the match, Lee and Akebono had to be separated from one another by the rest of Dragon Gate USA's locker room. Later in the night, Cima used his draft pick to name Lee the newest member of his Warriors International stable. At the following day's tapings of Freedom Fight 2010, Lee defeated Akebono in a singles match. On January 28, 2011, at United: NYC, Lee, now representing the heel group Blood Warriors, defeated Jimmy Jacobs in a singles match. The following day at United: Philly, Lee suffered his first loss in Dragon Gate USA, when he was defeated by Open the Freedom Gate Champion Yamato in a non-title match.

On December 21, 2010, Lee made his debut for Japanese promotion Dragon Gate (DG) in Tokyo, where he, representing The Warriors stable, defeated Kzy. The Warriors stable turned heel on January 14, 2011, when they attacked Masato Yoshino and World-1, aligning themselves with Naruki Doi's group, though Lee himself was not present, as he was snowed in and could not make the show. The following day, Lee made his return to DG as a member of the new top heel group, in a match where he, Gamma and Genki Horiguchi defeated Yamato, Kagetora and Diablo. On January 18, the new group was named Blood Warriors.

=== WWE (2012–2019) ===
==== The Wyatt Family (2012–2014) ====
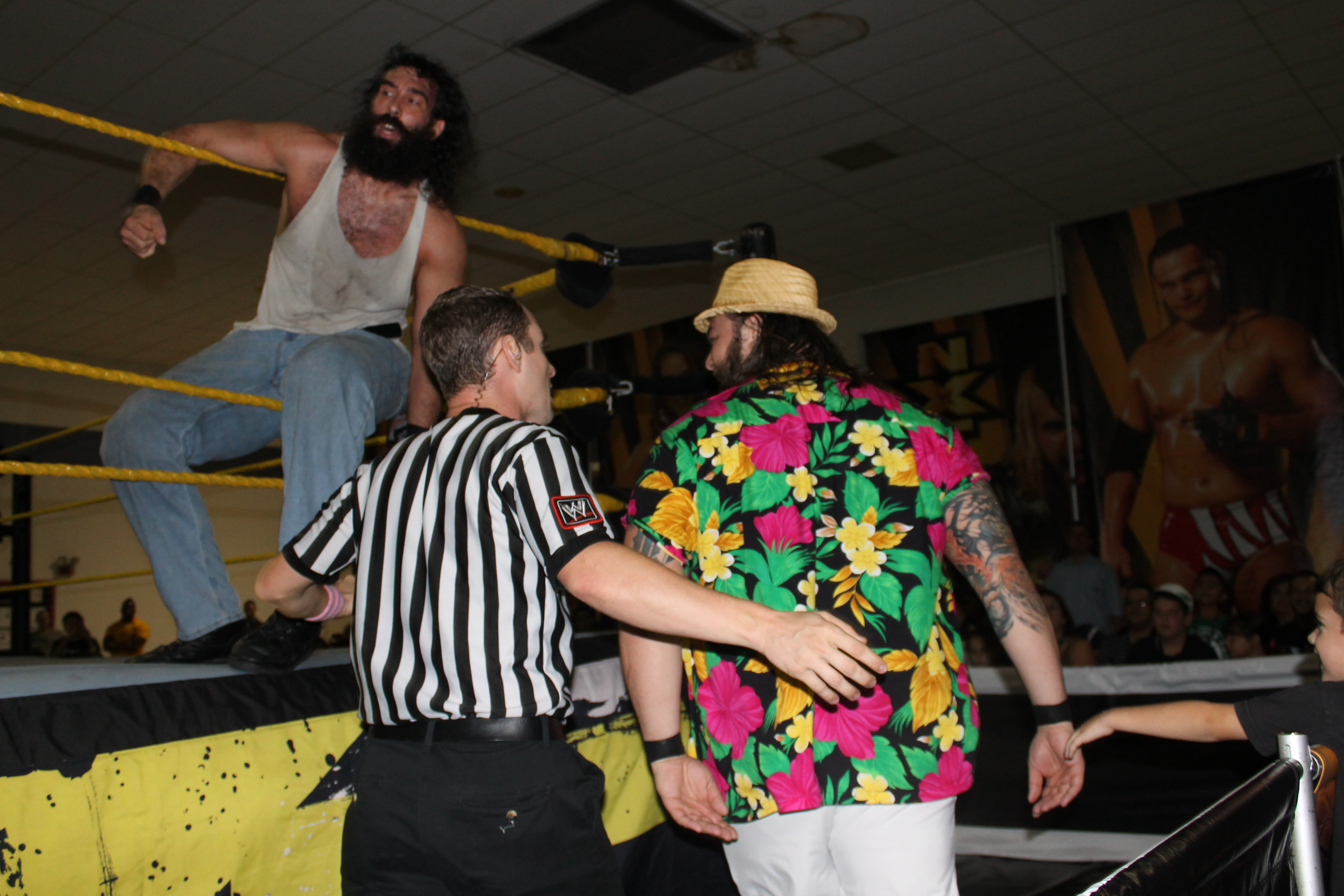
Harper (on ropes) and Bray Wyatt at an NXT event in October 2012

On March 12, 2012, it was reported that Huber had signed a developmental contract with WWE. He made his debut for WWE's developmental territory Florida Championship Wrestling (FCW) at a house show on May 18, working under the new ring name Luke Harper.

When FCW was rebranded as NXT in August, Harper made his television debut on the November 7 episode of NXT as a follower of Bray Wyatt, who introduced Harper as the "first son" of The Wyatt Family. The Wyatt Family later also came to include Wyatt's "second son" Erick Rowan, with whom Harper formed a tag team. The two defeated Percy Watson and Yoshi Tatsu in their first match together on the January 9, 2013, episode of NXT. On the January 23 episode of NXT, Harper and Rowan again defeated Watson and Tatsu in the opening round of the NXT Tag Team Championship tournament. Following a win over Bo Dallas and Michael McGillicutty in the semi-finals with Wyatt's interference, Harper and Rowan were defeated in the finals of the tournament by Adrian Neville and Oliver Grey. Harper defeated Neville on the March 20 episode of NXT. On the May 2 episode of NXT, Harper and Rowan won a triple threat elimination tag match by last pinning Neville. On the May 8 episode of NXT, Harper and Rowan defeated Adrian Neville and Bo Dallas, filling in for the injured Grey, to win the NXT Tag Team Championship. After retaining the title against Corey Graves and Kassius Ohno on the June 5 episode of NXT, Harper and Rowan lost the NXT Tag Team Championship to Adrian Neville and Corey Graves on the July 17 episode of NXT.

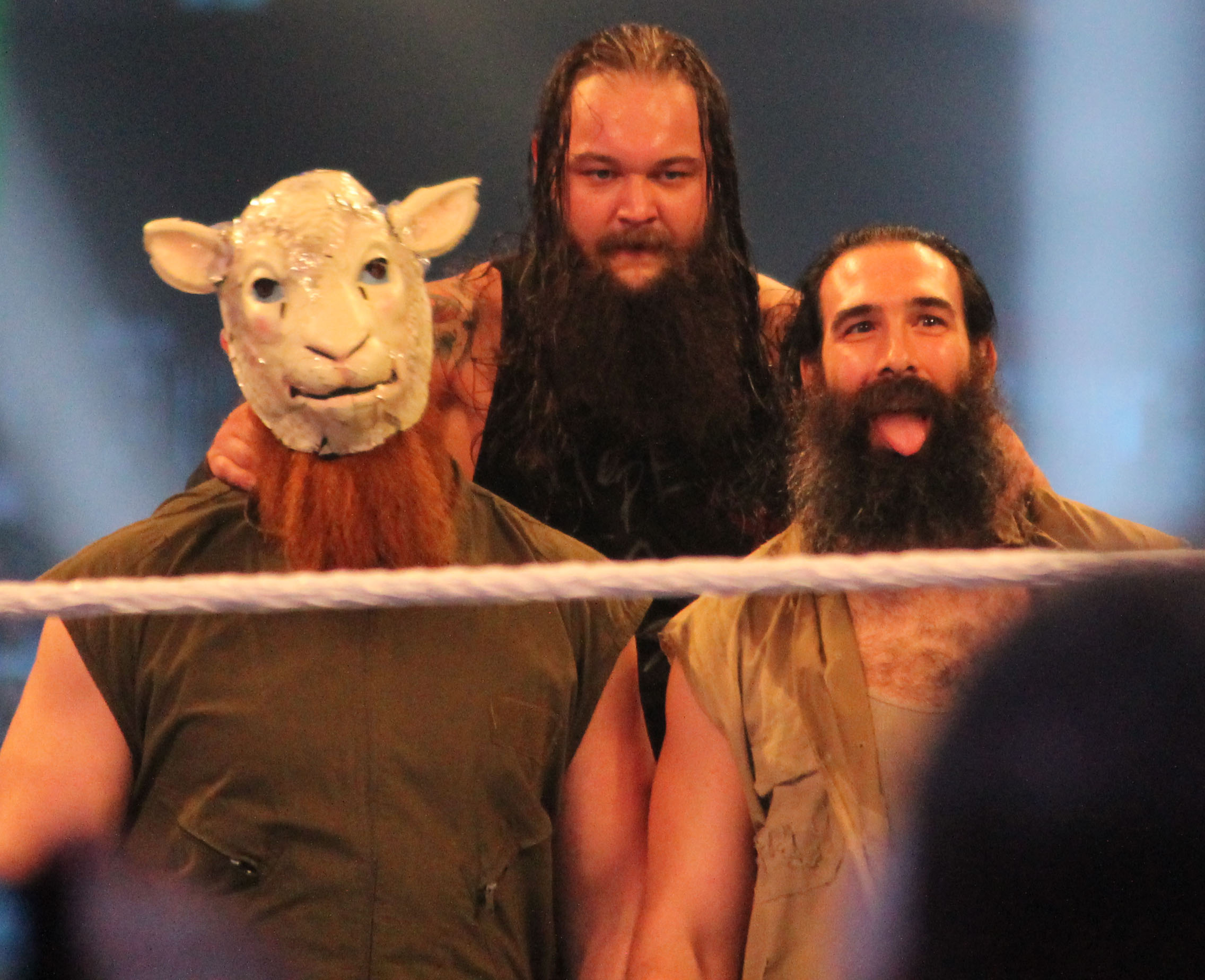
Harper (right) with other The Wyatt Family members in April 2014

From the May 27 episode of Raw, WWE aired vignettes promoting the upcoming debut of The Wyatt Family. The vignettes showed The Wyatt Family's backwoods origins. On the July 8 episode of Raw, The Wyatt Family made their debut by assaulting Kane. Harper made his WWE in-ring debut on the July 26 SmackDown, where he and Rowan defeated Tons of Funk (Brodus Clay and Tensai). Over the next few months, Harper and Rowan went on a winning streak over many teams, until Cody Rhodes and Goldust handed them their first loss on the October 11 episode of SmackDown. In November, The Wyatt Family started a rivalry with CM Punk and Daniel Bryan heading into Survivor Series on November 24, where Harper and Rowan lost to Punk and Bryan in a tag team match. The following month at TLC: Tables, Ladders & Chairs on December 15, The Wyatt Family defeated Bryan in a 3-on-1 handicap match.

At the Royal Rumble on January 26, 2014, Harper competed in his first Royal Rumble match, where he eliminated two other participants before being eliminated by Roman Reigns. Shortly afterwards, The Wyatt Family began a feud with The Shield (Dean Ambrose, Roman Reigns and Seth Rollins), leading to a match between the teams at Elimination Chamber on February 23, which The Wyatt Family won. During this time, Harper and Rowan also supported Bray Wyatt in his feud with John Cena through WrestleMania XXX on April 6, with Harper and Rowan also starting their own feud with the WWE Tag Team Champions The Usos (Jey Uso and Jimmy Uso), who supported Cena in the feud. Harper and Rowan went on to unsuccessfully challenge The Usos for the WWE Tag Team Championship at both Money in the Bank on June 29 and Battleground on July 20.

==== Intercontinental Champion (2014–2015) ====
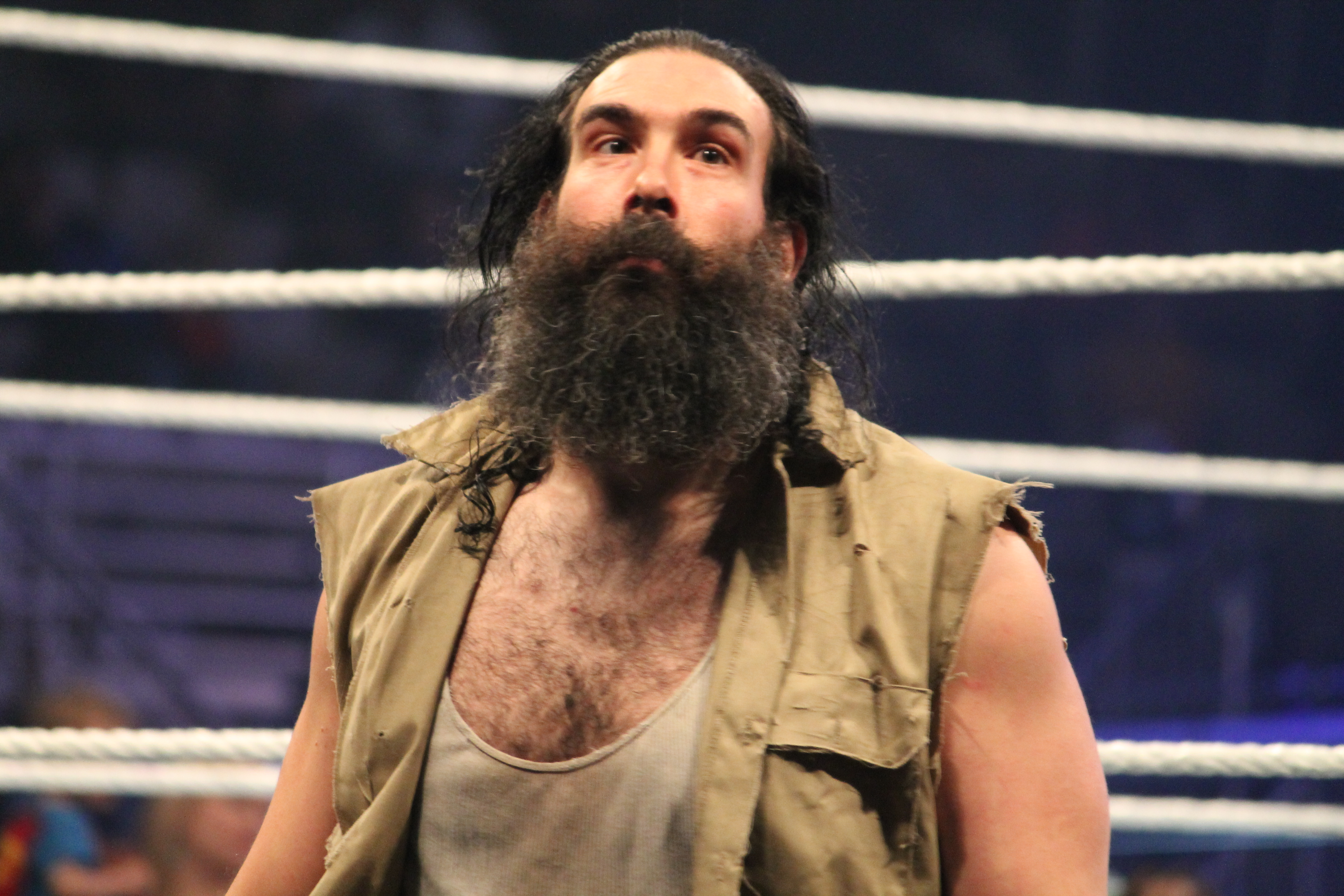
In September 2014, The Wyatt Family split and Harper went off into singles competition, winning the WWE Intercontinental Championship

Beginning on September 29, vignettes were shown of Harper and Rowan being "set free" by Wyatt, marking the dissolution of The Wyatt Family and the transition of its members into singles competition. After a further series of video vignettes aimed at Dolph Ziggler, Harper made his return to television during the closing moments of the November 10 episode of Raw, throwing an unconscious Ziggler at Triple H and Stephanie McMahon's feet and expressing his desire to join their team at Survivor Series on November 23. The following week on Raw, Harper officially joined Team Authority. Immediately after, Harper was awarded an impromptu match for the Intercontinental Championship against Dolph Ziggler, which, after interference from Seth Rollins, Harper won to capture his first main roster title. At Survivor Series, Team Authority lost the match, in which Harper was eliminated by Ziggler. As punishment for his affiliation with The Authority, Harper was forced to defend the Intercontinental Championship against Dean Ambrose on the November 24 episode of Raw and successfully retained the title after getting himself disqualified. Harper lost the title back to Ziggler in a ladder match at TLC: Tables, Ladders & Chairs on December 14, ending his reign at 27 days, and failed to regain the title in a rematch on the December 22 episode of Raw.

On January 25, 2015, Harper entered the Royal Rumble match at number 4, and was eliminated by Bray Wyatt. Beginning in early March, Harper was involved into a storyline where he was one of many wrestlers stealing Bad News Barrett's Intercontinental Championship belt from Barrett and each other. This led to a seven-man ladder match for the title on March 29 at WrestleMania 31, which was won by Daniel Bryan. The match led to a new feud between Harper and Dean Ambrose (who was also a participant in the ladder match at WrestleMania), with Harper losing a Chicago Street Fight between the pair at Extreme Rules on April 26. On the April 27 episode of Raw, Harper took part in the 2015 King of the Ring tournament, but was eliminated by Neville in the first round.

==== Return of The Wyatt Family (2015–2017) ====
In early May, Harper revived his alliance with Erick Rowan. After Rowan suffered an injury, Harper reunited with Bray Wyatt on July 19 at Battleground by helping him defeat Roman Reigns. This led to a tag team match between Harper and Wyatt against Roman Reigns and Dean Ambrose at SummerSlam on August 23, which they lost after Reigns pinned Wyatt. The following night on Raw, Braun Strowman joined Harper and Wyatt as the new member of The Wyatt Family. At Night of Champions on September 20, The Wyatt Family defeated Reigns, Ambrose and Chris Jericho in a six-man tag team match. On the October 19 episode of Raw, Erick Rowan returned to The Wyatt Family when he filled in for Harper (who was unable to show for personal reasons). The Wyatt Family then got involved in a feud with The Brothers of Destruction (The Undertaker and Kane), which built to a tag team match on November 22 at Survivor Series, where the two defeated Harper and Wyatt. The next night on Raw, Harper teamed with Wyatt again to defeat The Dudley Boyz, igniting a new feud. Over the next weeks, Tommy Dreamer and Rhyno joined The Dudley Boyz in the feud, leading to an eight-man tag team tables match at TLC: Tables, Ladders & Chairs on December 13, where Harper, Wyatt, Rowan and Strowman were victorious. On January 24, 2016, Harper competed in the Royal Rumble with fellow Wyatt Family members and he was eliminated by Brock Lesnar, but returned to the ring later on with The Wyatt Family members to eliminate Lesnar. Harper and Wyatt were defeated by Lesnar in a 2-on-1 handicap match at the Roadblock event on March 12. On March 21, Harper suffered a knee injury during an untelevised match on Raw, sidelining him for five to six months. After getting an MRI, it was revealed that he had dislocated his patella and tore his medial patellofemoral ligament. Because of his injury, Harper was not drafted to either Raw or SmackDown in the 2016 WWE draft.

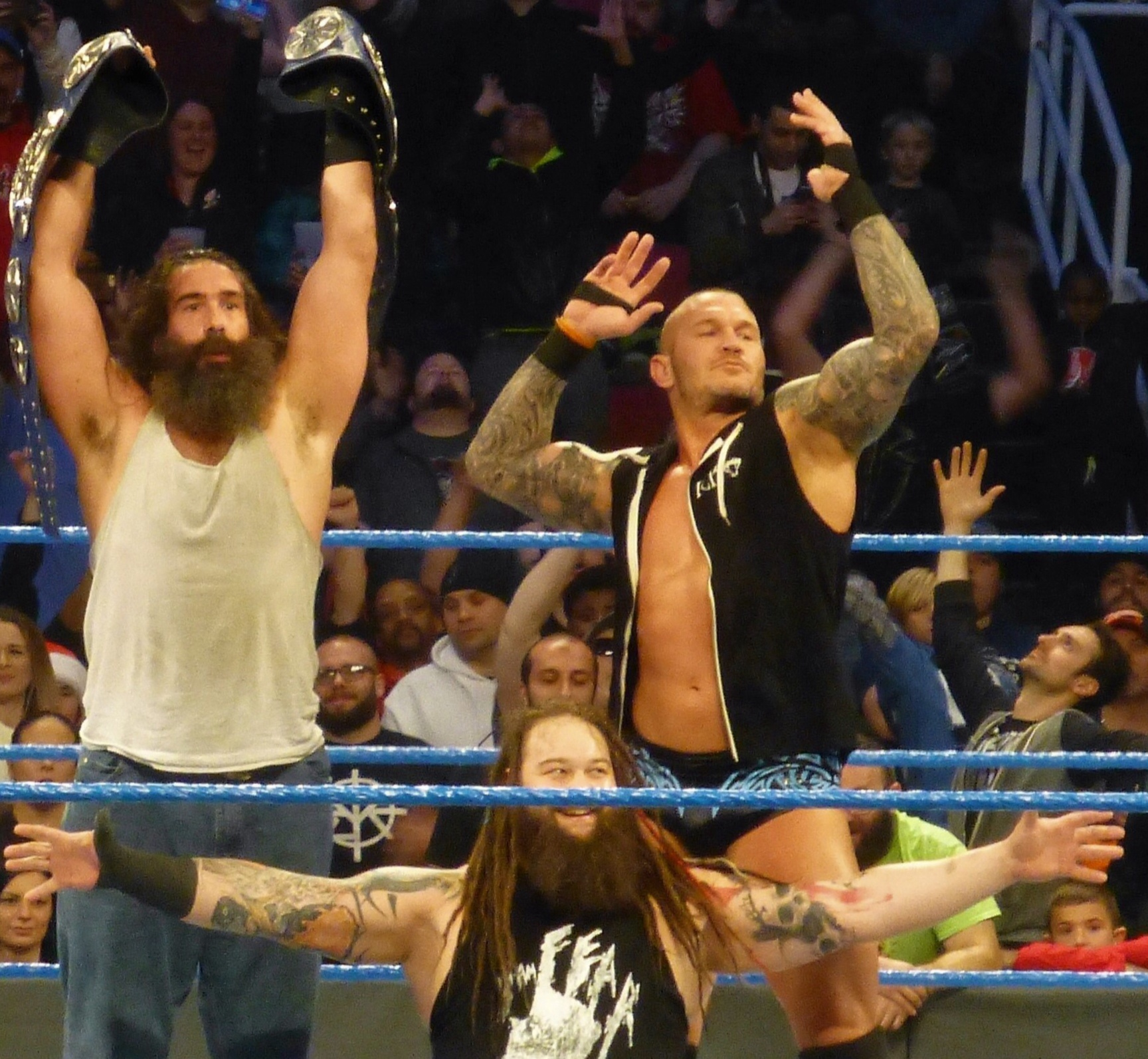
Harper, Bray Wyatt and Randy Orton as the SmackDown Tag Team Champions in December 2016

Harper returned to the ring on October 5, unsuccessfully teaming with Kevin Owens against Sami Zayn and Seth Rollins at a house show in Santiago, Chile. Four days later, Harper returned in the match of the SmackDown brand pay-per-view No Mercy on October 9, helping Bray Wyatt defeat Randy Orton by distracting Orton. On December 4 at TLC: Tables, Ladders & Chairs, Wyatt and Orton, who had recently joined The Wyatt Family, captured the SmackDown Tag Team Championship, and three days later it was announced that Harper had been sanctioned as champion as well, making him eligible to defend the title under the Freebird Rule. The Wyatt Family, represented by Harper and Orton, lost the SmackDown Tag Team Championship to American Alpha (Chad Gable and Jason Jordan) in a four-way elimination match on the December 27 episode of SmackDown Live. After the match, Harper and Orton showed tension over the loss. After Wyatt and Orton unsuccessfully challenged American Alpha for the title on the January 10, 2017, episode of SmackDown Live, Harper and Orton shoved each other, which led to Harper accidentally superkicking Wyatt. Harper and Orton continued having problems with each other, leading to a match between the two on the January 24 episode of SmackDown Live, where Orton was victorious. After the match, Wyatt attacked Harper with the Sister Abigail, separating him from the group.

At the Royal Rumble on January 29, Harper entered the Royal Rumble match at number 25, attacking both Wyatt and Orton and eliminating Apollo Crews, before being eliminated by Goldberg. On the January 31 episode of SmackDown Live, Harper turned face after helping WWE Champion John Cena in his confrontation with Orton and Wyatt. At Elimination Chamber on February 12, Harper was defeated by Orton. Shortly after this, Harper unsuccessfully faced AJ Styles over number one contendership for the WWE Championship, held by Wyatt. At the WrestleMania 33 pre-show on April 2, Harper took part in the André the Giant Memorial Battle Royal, from which he was eliminated by Titus O'Neil. Following WrestleMania, Harper feuded with the returning Erick Rowan, leading to a match at Backlash on May 21, which Harper won. On the July 4 episode of SmackDown Live, Harper took part in the Independence Day Battle Royal to determine the number one contender for the United States Championship. He failed to win as the match was eventually won by AJ Styles. Harper then disappeared from WWE television for several months.

==== Bludgeon Brothers (2017–2018) ====
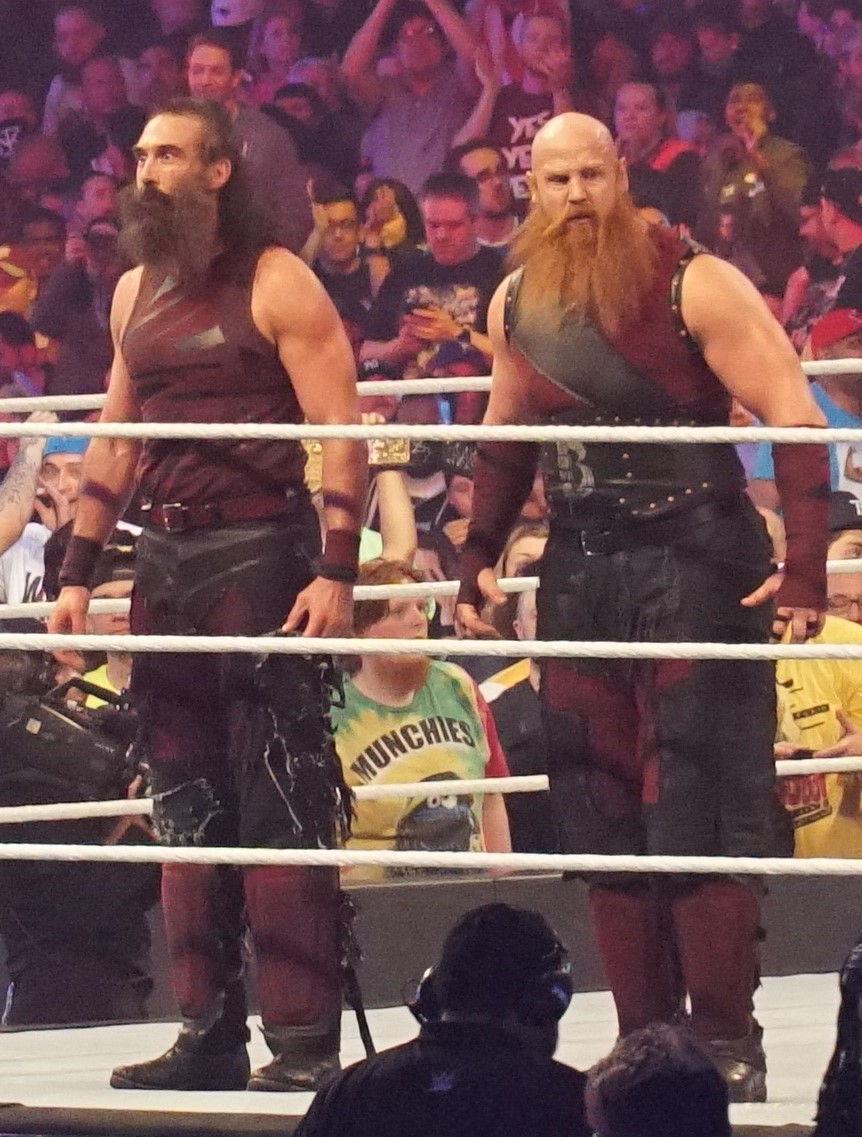
The Bludgeon Brothers at WrestleMania 34 in April 2018, where they won the WWE SmackDown Tag Team Championship

On the October 10 episode of SmackDown Live, as a heel again, Harper returned to television in a vignette where he was once again aligned with Erick Rowan. The duo were dubbed "The Bludgeon Brothers", with Harper's ring name shortened to simply "Harper". The team wrestled their return match on the November 21 episode of SmackDown Live, defeating The Hype Bros (Zack Ryder and Mojo Rawley). At Clash of Champions on December 17, The Bludgeon Brothers defeated Breezango (Fandango and Tyler Breeze) in a squash match. Going into 2018, The Bludgeon Brothers began to target SmackDown Tag Team Champions The Usos, as well as their rivals The New Day.

On March 11, 2018, The Bludgeon Brothers made an appearance at Fastlane, interfering during the SmackDown Tag Team Championship match between The Usos and The New Day. This led to a tag team championship match between the three teams at WrestleMania 34, which The Bludgeon Brothers won to attain the titles. They would go on to successfully defend the titles against The Usos at the Greatest Royal Rumble event, against Luke Gallows and Karl Anderson at Money in the Bank, and against Team Hell No at Extreme Rules. The Bludgeon Brothers lost by disqualification in a championship defense against The New Day at SummerSlam, resulting in them retaining the titles. Two nights later on the August 21 episode of SmackDown Live, The New Day defeated The Bludgeon Brothers in a no disqualification match to win the championships, ending their reign at 135 days. The following day, it was announced that Rowan had suffered a torn right bicep, sidelining him indefinitely and putting the team on hiatus.

==== Sporadic appearances and departure (2018–2019) ====
Harper made a surprise appearance at a NXT house show on September 6, where he unsuccessfully challenged Ricochet for the NXT North American Championship. Soon after, Harper took time off after undergoing surgery for a wrist injury. On March 9, 2019, Harper returned to in-ring action, defeating Mojo Rawley at a house show in his hometown of Rochester. He made his televised return at WrestleMania Axxess, defeating Dominik Dijakovic, which aired as part of the WWE Worlds Collide special. Following that, he competed in the André the Giant Memorial Battle Royal at the WrestleMania 35 pre-show, but failed to win as he was eliminated by Braun Strowman. After WrestleMania, Harper wrestled against EC3 in a dark match before an episode of SmackDown. It was reported that WWE chairman Vince McMahon did not like the match, so he canceled creative plans for Harper including a feud with Sami Zayn. After that, on April 16, Harper requested his release from WWE, as he had yet to appear on weekly television. His request was denied by McMahon. Dave Meltzer of the Wrestling Observer Newsletter later reported that Harper's contract was originally going to expire in November 2019, but WWE added six months to it, due to the time missed due to injury. In mid-July it was reported that Harper had returned to traveling with the roster, as he had been off events since requesting his release.

At the Clash of Champions pay-per-view event on September 15, with his old ring name Luke Harper, he made his televised return to WWE programming by attacking Roman Reigns in his match with former partner Erick Rowan. On the following episode of SmackDown Live, Harper ambushed Daniel Bryan after a confrontation with Rowan, only to be interrupted by Reigns, who Harper and Rowan laid out as well. At Hell in a Cell, Harper and Rowan were defeated by Reigns and Bryan in a tag team match. As part of the 2019 draft, Erick Rowan was drafted to Raw, disbanding the team. Harper's last televised match in WWE was in a battle royal at the Crown Jewel event on October 31, which he lost.

On November 26, he filed a trademark for Brodie Lee, his former wrestling ring name. On December 8, it was announced that Harper had been released from his WWE contract.

=== All Elite Wrestling (2020) ===
Huber made his surprise debut for All Elite Wrestling (AEW) on the March 18, 2020, episode of Dynamite, reverting to his Brodie Lee ring name. He was revealed as the "Exalted One", the previously unseen leader of the villainous faction The Dark Order, and attacked SoCal Uncensored with the other members of the group. After remaining undefeated for several weeks, he lost for the first time against Jon Moxley in a match for the AEW World Championship at Double or Nothing on May 23. Over the following months, Lee recruited new members into The Dark Order, including Colt Cabana and Anna Jay. On the August 22 episode of Dynamite, Lee quickly defeated Cody to win the AEW TNT Championship. He successfully defended the TNT Championship against Rhodes and Orange Cassidy on the September 9 and 23 episodes of Dynamite, respectively. Cody returned after Lee's match against Cassidy, and Lee challenged him to a dog collar match for the TNT Championship. On the October 7 episode of Dynamite, Cody won the championship and ended Lee's reign at 55 days (46 days as recognized by AEW due to tape delay). This would mark Lee's final match as he then went on hiatus and was reportedly dealing with an undisclosed injury, but died from idiopathic pulmonary fibrosis in December.

== Professional wrestling style and persona ==
Huber's wrestling style has been described as mix of "blending power moves with deceptive agility" and "pioneering a new wave of athletic giants". He cited Jake Roberts, Rick Rude, and Big Show as his primary influences.

Huber has described his original "The Right Stuff" gimmick as him "just having fun" and, despite being a heavyweight, claimed he was a "cruiserweight". Upon his debut in WWE as Luke Harper, he became part of The Wyatt Family, a cult-like faction with Bray Wyatt as their leader. According to Huber, WWE chairman Vince McMahon envisioned Harper as a hillbilly and asked him to speak with a Southern-like drawl. The faction split in early 2017, but Harper later reunited with former Wyatt Family teammate Erick Rowan to form a tag team dubbed The Bludgeon Brothers. The duo carried wooden mallets to the ring and had a look apparently modeled after Demolition, a tag team who wrestled for WWE in the 1980s. Desiring a run as a singles competitor, Huber pitched several gimmick ideas to McMahon, such as a "collector" who took trophies from his defeated opponents and an "intelligent monster" who would eloquently tell his rivals how he was going to hurt them, but his ideas were rejected by McMahon and WWE creative.

After joining AEW in March 2020, Huber reverted to his pre-WWE name of Brodie Lee and was unveiled as "The Exalted One", the previously anonymous leader of The Dark Order stable. Adding the prefix "Mr." to his name, he assumed the gimmick of a suit-wearing corporate executive who denied allegations that The Dark Order was a cult, and often harshly punished his disciples for petty transgressions. The character drew comparisons to McMahon due to displaying traits similar to ones often attributed to McMahon, such as disliking people sneezing in his presence, but Huber denied this and instead stated that it was inspired by mafia films.

== Other media ==
In 2017, Huber appeared as Pitchfork Perry in an episode of the period drama series Damnation. In 2018, he played Lachlan Allsopp in the action-horror film Mohawk. Under the Luke Harper name, he is a playable character in the video games WWE 2K15, WWE 2K16, WWE 2K17, WWE 2K18, WWE 2K19, and WWE 2K20, and in AEW Fight Forever under his Mr. Brodie Lee name as a legend.

== Personal life ==
Huber married Amanda, a fellow professional wrestler who previously performed under the name Synndy Synn, in 2011. They had two sons named Brodie and Nolan. Following Huber's death, Brodie was signed to AEW and became a member of his father's faction The Dark Order at the age of eight, with AEW stating that he can immediately start to perform for the company when he comes of age if he so wishes. Brodie - under the ring name Brodie Lee Jr. - wrestled his first match at Joey Janela's Spring Break 2026, by winning the 2026 "Clusterfuck Battle Royal", and defeated Joey Janela in his debut singles match in the main event of the following year's Spring Break event.

Huber was a fan of the then-Washington Football Team and Toronto Maple Leafs.

== Death ==
On December 26, 2020, Huber died at the Mayo Clinic in Jacksonville, Florida, 10 days after his 41st birthday. His widow, Amanda, said that he had been receiving treatment for a lung issue at the clinic since late October. Despite what some fans believed at the time, the issue was unrelated to the COVID-19 pandemic as Huber had tested negative multiple times. He had been moved to the intensive care unit in late October. On the AEW Unrestricted podcast in January 2021, Amanda revealed that Huber had died from idiopathic pulmonary fibrosis, a rare condition which causes lung tissue to continuously thicken until the lungs can no longer function.

== Legacy ==
The original red strap version of the AEW TNT Championship belt; in honor of Jon Huber, who was the championship's second title holder, this red strap version of the title belt was retired on December 30, 2020, and given to his son Brodie Huber, who was named honorary "TNT Champion for life"

A multitude of wrestlers and wrestling personalities paid tribute to Huber with previously untold stories on social media, most of which shared a running theme of him being devoted to his wife and children while going out of his way to guide and support other wrestlers. His former Wyatt Family teammates also paid tribute: Bray Wyatt called Huber his "best friend, brother, [and] partner", Erick Rowan said that Huber "meant more to [him] than he will ever know", and Braun Strowman referred to Huber as "one of the most unselfish men [he has] ever met and an amazing husband and father". Cody Rhodes, against whom Huber wrestled his final match, called the match "an honor and a privilege and an experience so ferociously humbling". Big E, who was particularly close with Huber and his son Brodie and was requested to be present alongside Rhodes with Amanda when informing Brodie of his father's death, spoke of how the professional wrestling industry as a whole came together to mourn the loss of a performer deemed to have made a personal impact on the careers and lives of many of his colleagues, stating, "I feel a real brotherhood. In that I have so many guys that I've worked with, who hit me up, who cried with me, who reached out to me, and that's beautiful. It really made me think, 'Man, we have something special in our industry.'" After many of the stories about Huber had been widely shared, Randy Orton stated, "You all have heard about how much we all respected [Huber], about how much we all enjoyed his presence. It is a fact."

The December 28, 2020, episode of WWE Raw opened with an "In Memory of Jon Huber ('Luke Harper')" graphic, as did the December 30 episode of WWE NXT and the January 1, 2021, episode of WWE SmackDown. Performers and commentators on Raw paid tribute by using some of Huber's catchphrases, such as commentator Tom Phillips welcoming the viewers to the show by exclaiming "it's Monday, you know what that means" and WWE Champion Drew McIntyre beginning his promo by stating "it's Monday and you know what that means [...] yeah, yeah, yeah". Xavier Woods, who wore an armband with "Brodie" written on it, performed Huber's signature taunt and finishing move during an eight-man tag team match. Over the next week, the promotion uploaded videos with various WWE wrestlers honoring and speaking of their memories with Huber. On January 11, The New Day (Big E, Kofi Kingston, and Xavier Woods) dedicated their Feel the Power podcast to Huber, which also featured Cesaro, Tyler Breeze, and Erick Rowan speaking about Huber; a video version of the podcast was put on the WWE Network. The next day on the WWE Network, the promotion added a new entry into their Best of WWE series entitled "Best of Luke Harper", an anthology showcasing several of Huber's matches in WWE, which also included comments by various wrestlers involved in those matches speaking of their time working with Huber. At the 2021 Royal Rumble, The New Day wore custom ring gear honoring Huber, later auctioning off the gear with all the proceeds going to Foodlink, a nonprofit foodbank based in Huber's hometown Rochester.

At WrestleMania 37 in April 2021, Bray Wyatt (who had largely been off television since before Huber's death) honored Huber by shouting Huber's "yeah, yeah, yeah" catchphrase during his match. Wyatt later died from a heart attack on August 24, 2023, at the age of 36, leaving Rowan and Strowman as the only surviving original Wyatt Family member.

The 236th episode of The Young Bucks' YouTube series Being The Elite (BTE) was titled "Brodie", featuring a compilation of Lee's BTE appearances. The following episode was titled "Tribute", featuring behind the scenes clips from his Celebration of Life memorial show. Since then, a painting of Huber has been present in The Dark Order's usual meeting room for their segments on BTE. The Dark Order members also continue to often wear Brodie Lee shirts and "RIP Brodie" armbands.

The December 30 episode of AEW Dynamite, which was a special episode titled "Brodie Lee Celebration of Life", featured matches and segments with fellow wrestlers honoring and paying tribute to Huber and his family. Every match on the card featured members of Huber's faction, The Dark Order. The memorial show began with the entire AEW roster onstage and commentator Jim Ross saying, "It's Wednesday and you know what that means", followed by a ten-bell salute. In the middle of the show, Huber's former long-time WWE tag team partner Erick Rowan, now under the name Erick Redbeard, made his AEW debut and held up a sign which said, "Goodbye for now, my brother. See you down the road." At the end of the show, Huber's widow and son left his wrestling boots and a purple bandana in the middle of the ring. As Huber was a former TNT Champion, AEW retired the red strap version of the title belt that had been used up to that point in honor of Huber, and presented the belt to Huber's son Brodie, with AEW President and CEO Tony Khan stating that Lee's son was "TNT Champion for life". Khan also regarded Huber as the greatest TNT Champion. A tribute video with "Ol' '55" by Tom Waits closed the show. Khan purchased the rights to the song in perpetuity, which he did "so the tribute will last forever". AEW has since adopted "it's Wednesday night, (and) you know what that means" as the standard introduction for episodes of AEW Dynamite, as further tribute to Huber. As Huber was a prominent figure for AEW during its time at Daily's Place in Jacksonville, Florida during the COVID-19 pandemic and with AEW's return to the venue in January 2024 for the two-part Homecoming special, AEW again paid tribute to Huber, airing a video package during the event and had three multi-person tag team matches with current and former members of The Dark Order.

During the tribute show, Pro Wrestling Tees' Shop AEW store released a T-shirt in memory of Lee with all proceeds benefiting The Huber Family. In less than two hours, it set a new record for most shirts sold within 24 hours, breaking Sting's previous record. In just under four hours, it became the highest selling T-shirt of 2020, breaking Orange Cassidy's previous record.

Night 1 of New Japan Pro-Wrestling's Wrestle Kingdom 15 started with commentator Kevin Kelly saying "it's January 4th, you know what that means" and dedicating the broadcast to Lee. In March 2021, wrestling journalist Dave Meltzer presented the Shad Gaspard/Jon Huber Memorial Award, named after Huber and fellow wrestler Shad Gaspard, who died in May 2020 while saving his young son from drowning, which is dedicated to people involved in professional wrestling who make positive contributions to society.

In August 2021, CM Punk revealed that Huber's death and how well his illness was kept secret amongst the AEW locker room out of respect inspired him to end his seven-year hiatus from wrestling, which began when he became disillusioned with WWE. Bryan Danielson also spoke about how the Brodie Lee Tribute Show inspired him to sign for AEW.

In September 2021, one week after winning the WWE Championship, Big E celebrated with The New Day and thanked the fans for their support and from "one incredible friend above" as the fans began to chant Huber's ring name.

== Championships and accomplishments ==
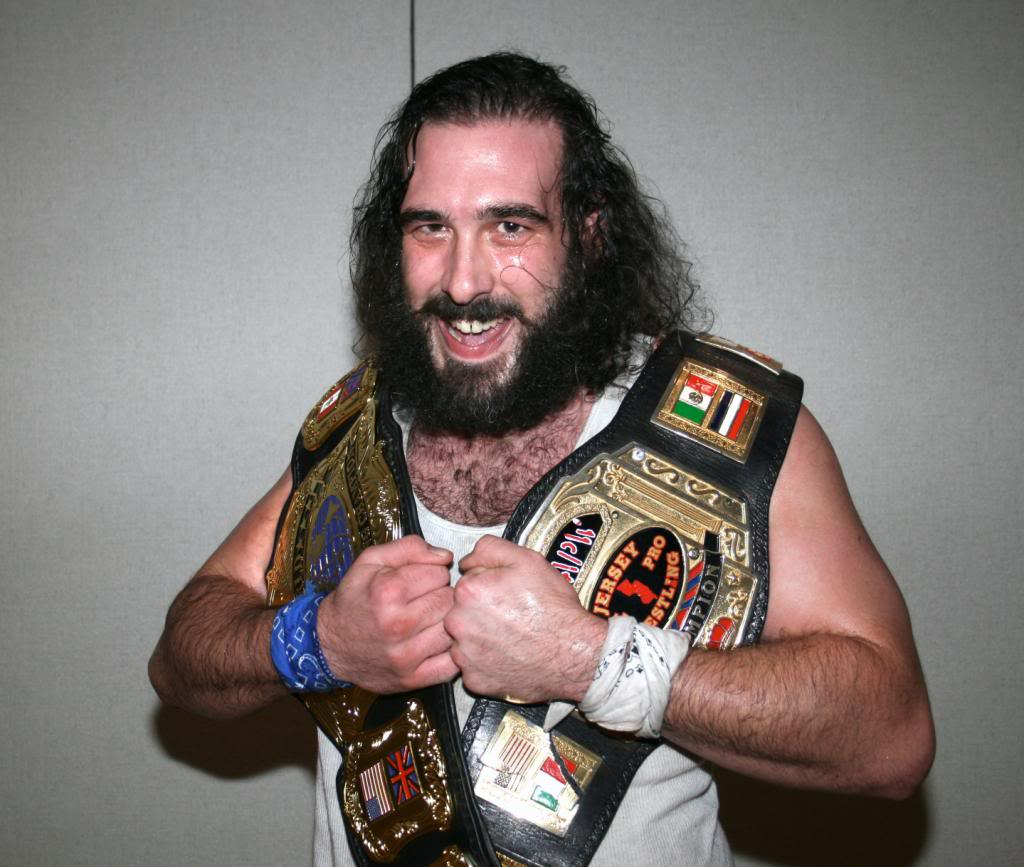
Lee holding both the JAPW Heavyweight and Tag Team Championship belts in November 2010

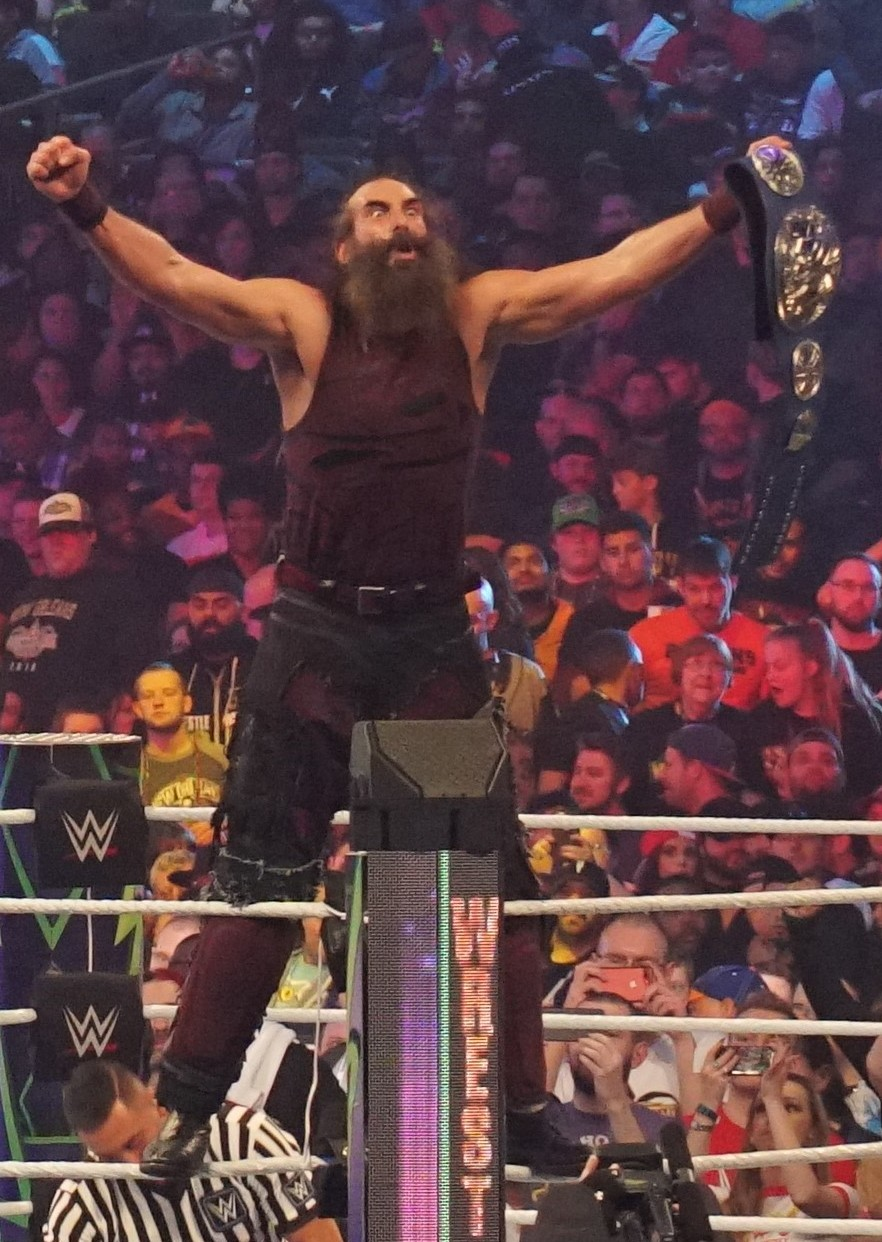
Harper won the WWE SmackDown Tag Team Championship twice, pictured here during his reign with Rowan as The Bludgeon Brothers

- Alpha-1 Wrestling
  - A1 Zero Gravity Championship (1 time)
- All Elite Wrestling
  - AEW TNT Championship (1 time)
- Jersey All Pro Wrestling
  - JAPW Heavyweight Championship (1 time)
  - JAPW New Jersey State Championship (1 time, final)
  - JAPW Tag Team Championship (1 time) – with Necro Butcher
- Next Era Wrestling
  - NEW Heavyweight Championship (1 time)
- NWA Empire
  - NWA Empire Heavyweight Championship (1 time)
- NWA Mississippi
  - NWA Southern Television Championship (1 time)
- Pro Wrestling Illustrated
  - Ranked No. 24 of the top 500 singles wrestlers in the PWI 500 in 2015
- Rochester Pro Wrestling/NWA Upstate/NWA New York
  - NWA Upstate Kayfabe Dojo Championship (1 time)
  - NWA Upstate/NWA New York Heavyweight Championship (3 times)
  - RPW Tag Team Championship (1 time) – with Freddie Midnight
  - RPW/NWA Upstate Television Championship (1 time)
- Squared Circle Wrestling
  - 2CW Heavyweight Championship (2 times)
- World of Hurt Wrestling
  - WOHW United States Championship (3 times)
- Wrestling Observer Newsletter
  - Best Gimmick (2013) – as part of The Wyatt Family
- WWE
  - WWE Intercontinental Championship (1 time)
  - WWE SmackDown Tag Team Championship (2 times) – with Bray Wyatt and Randy Orton (1) (Note: Harper, Wyatt, and Orton defended the title under the Freebird Rule.) and Rowan (1)
  - NXT Tag Team Championship (1 time) – with Erick Rowan
  - Slammy Award (1 time)
    - Match of the Year (2014) Team Cena vs. Team Authority at Survivor Series

== See also ==
- List of premature professional wrestling deaths
- List of professional wrestling memorial shows
