= The Authority (professional wrestling) =

Professional wrestling stable

- The official Authority logo

Stable
- Name: The Authority
- Leader(s): Triple H Stephanie McMahon; Mr. McMahon
- Former members: See below
- Debut: August 18, 2013
- Disbanded: April 4, 2016
- Years active: 2013–2016

The Authority was a villainous professional wrestling stable in WWE, which originated due to Triple H helping Randy Orton win the WWE Championship from Daniel Bryan at the 2013 SummerSlam pay-per-view immediately after cashing in the Money in the Bank contract. The name of "The Authority" was introduced on October 7, 2013, on Raw during a match between The Shield vs Cody Rhodes, Goldust and Daniel Bryan. The Authority initially referred to only Triple H and Stephanie McMahon as a power couple. The Authority shared similarities with The Corporation and The McMahon-Helmsley Faction, and also had ties to Triple H's previous stables D-Generation X (DX) and Evolution, the latter of which existed alongside The Authority for a brief period in 2014.

The stable was led by company executives Triple H and Stephanie McMahon. Many other wrestlers were a part of the group, most prominently including Randy Orton as The Authority's hand-picked champion and "Face of the WWE" until November 2014, Seth Rollins as "The Man" until suffering a knee injury in November 2015, and Kane as the "Director of Operations" until October 2015. The Shield (Rollins, Roman Reigns, and Dean Ambrose) formerly acted as The Authority's main henchmen to offer protection or carry out attacks until March 2014.

The stable became inactive following WrestleMania 32, when Triple H was dethroned as WWE World Heavyweight Champion by Reigns, and Shane McMahon received authority to run Raw. Triple H and Stephanie reunited against Seth Rollins at WrestleMania 33, where Rollins defeated Triple H, but the two were not referred to as The Authority again until February 2018, where Triple H and Stephanie McMahon were defeated by Kurt Angle and Ronda Rousey at WrestleMania 34 in a mixed tag team match.

== History ==
=== 2013 ===
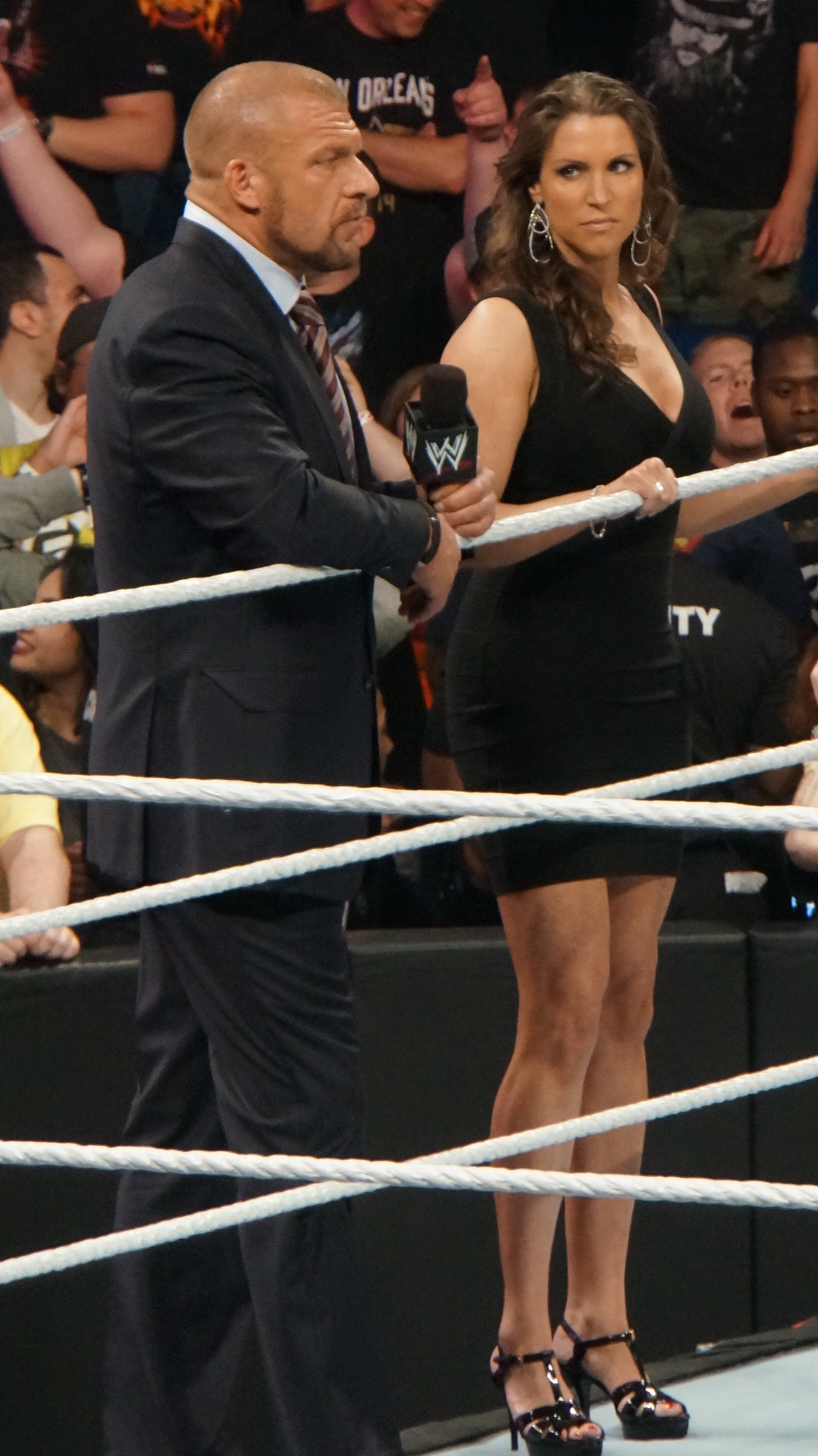
Triple H and Stephanie McMahon created The Authority

From June 2013, members of the McMahon family began to dispute various elements of the control of WWE, such as the fates of Daniel Bryan, as well as Raw and SmackDown General Managers Brad Maddox and Vickie Guerrero, respectively. On the July 15 episode of Raw, John Cena chose Bryan as his opponent for his WWE Championship defense at SummerSlam. In the following weeks, Mr. McMahon repeatedly offered Bryan a corporate makeover, which Bryan constantly refused. Triple H subsequently announced himself as the special guest referee for the match.

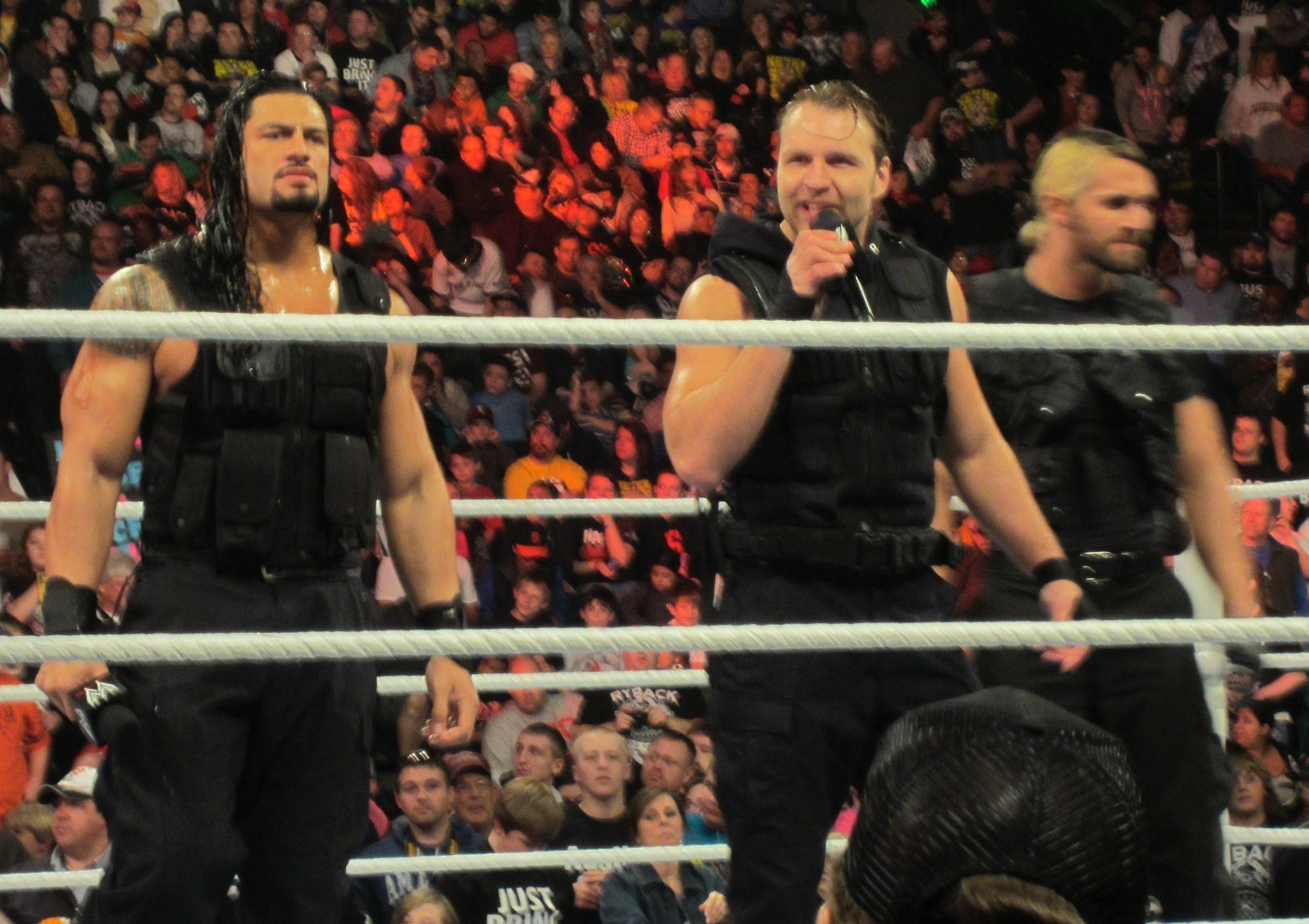
Dean Ambrose (of The Shield) addresses the crowd during Raw

At SummerSlam, Bryan defeated Cena to win the WWE Championship. After the match, Triple H gave Bryan a Pedigree, allowing Randy Orton to cash in his Money in the Bank contract both turning heel for the first time since 2006 and 2010 respectively. The next night on Raw, Orton had a championship coronation along with Mr. McMahon, Stephanie McMahon and Triple H, with Triple H inviting Bryan to the ring to clear the air from the night before. This was a ruse, as Orton attacked Bryan and cemented the formation of the group. That same night, The Shield (Dean Ambrose, Roman Reigns, and Seth Rollins) began to work for Triple H as his enforcers. Kane also joined The Authority as the "Director of Operations".

During this time, The Authority were feuding with Big Show, who as well as Bryan, was voicing his displeasure of Triple H's regime. As punishment for this, Big Show was placed in a 3-on-1 tornado handicap match against The Shield, which Big Show lost. He was then forced to sit at ringside during his friends' matches and watch them being attacked by members of The Authority at the risk of being fired. The Authority later claimed that Big Show was broke (kayfabe) and forced him to knock out the likes of Bryan and The Miz, again at the risk of being "fired". At Battleground, Big Show interfered in the WWE Championship match between Bryan and Orton and knocked out both of them, sending a message to The Authority and causing the match to end in a no contest. The following night on Raw, Big Show was "fired" by The Authority after he announced he was ordered to only knock out Bryan the night before. Following this, Big Show knocked out Triple H before being escorted by officials out of the arena. After Stephanie McMahon took possession of Big Show's house and Triple H banned him from WWE for life (kayfabe), Big Show began to run-in and attack various superstars over the next several weeks until the November 4 episode of Raw, when The Authority was forced by the Board of Directors to give Big Show whatever he wanted in return for not suing the company. Big Show asked for his job back and a WWE Championship match against Orton at Survivor Series, which he received. At Survivor Series, Orton successfully retained his title.

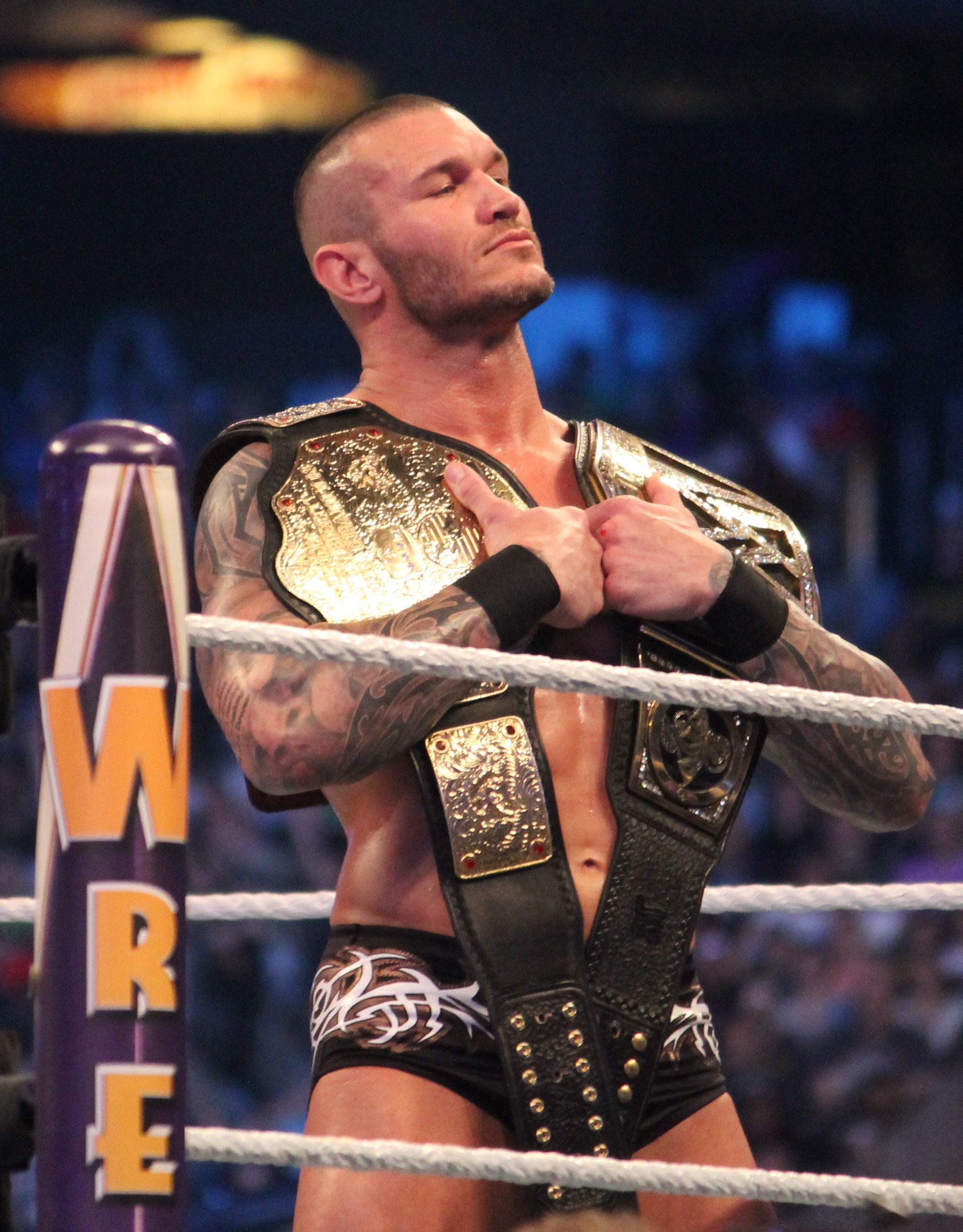
Randy Orton as the WWE World Heavyweight Champion at WrestleMania XXX

The Authority were involved in a short feud with Cody Rhodes, after Rhodes also spoke out against Triple H's authoritarian rule. Rhodes was forced in a match against Orton on the September 2 episode of Raw, with his job on the line, which he lost and was fired after the match. Over the next few weeks, his brother Goldust tried to win his job back, losing to Orton on an episode of Raw, while his father Dusty Rhodes, after confronting Stephanie McMahon, was knocked out unwillingly by Big Show while pleading for his sons to get their jobs back. At Battleground, Rhodes won his job back after teaming up with Goldust by defeating Shield members Seth Rollins and Roman Reigns in a non-title match. On the October 14 episode of Raw, The Rhodes Brothers defeated Rollins and Reigns again in a no disqualification match for the WWE Tag Team Championship after an attack by Big Show.

Orton continued to feud with Bryan over the WWE Championship. At Night of Champions, Bryan defeated Orton to win the title. However, the following night on Raw, Triple H stripped Bryan of the title due to a fast 3-count by referee Scott Armstrong. Orton and Bryan competed for the vacated WWE Championship at Hell in a Cell, where Orton won back the title after special guest referee Shawn Michaels superkicked Bryan. On the November 25 episode of Raw, Orton's long time rival, then World Heavyweight Champion John Cena, suggested that there should only be "one champion" in WWE. Triple H announced a unification match at TLC: Tables, Ladders and Chairs, where Orton defeated Cena in a Tables, Ladders, and Chairs match to unify his WWE Championship with Cena's World Heavyweight Championship, which ultimately created the WWE World Heavyweight Championship.

=== 2014 ===
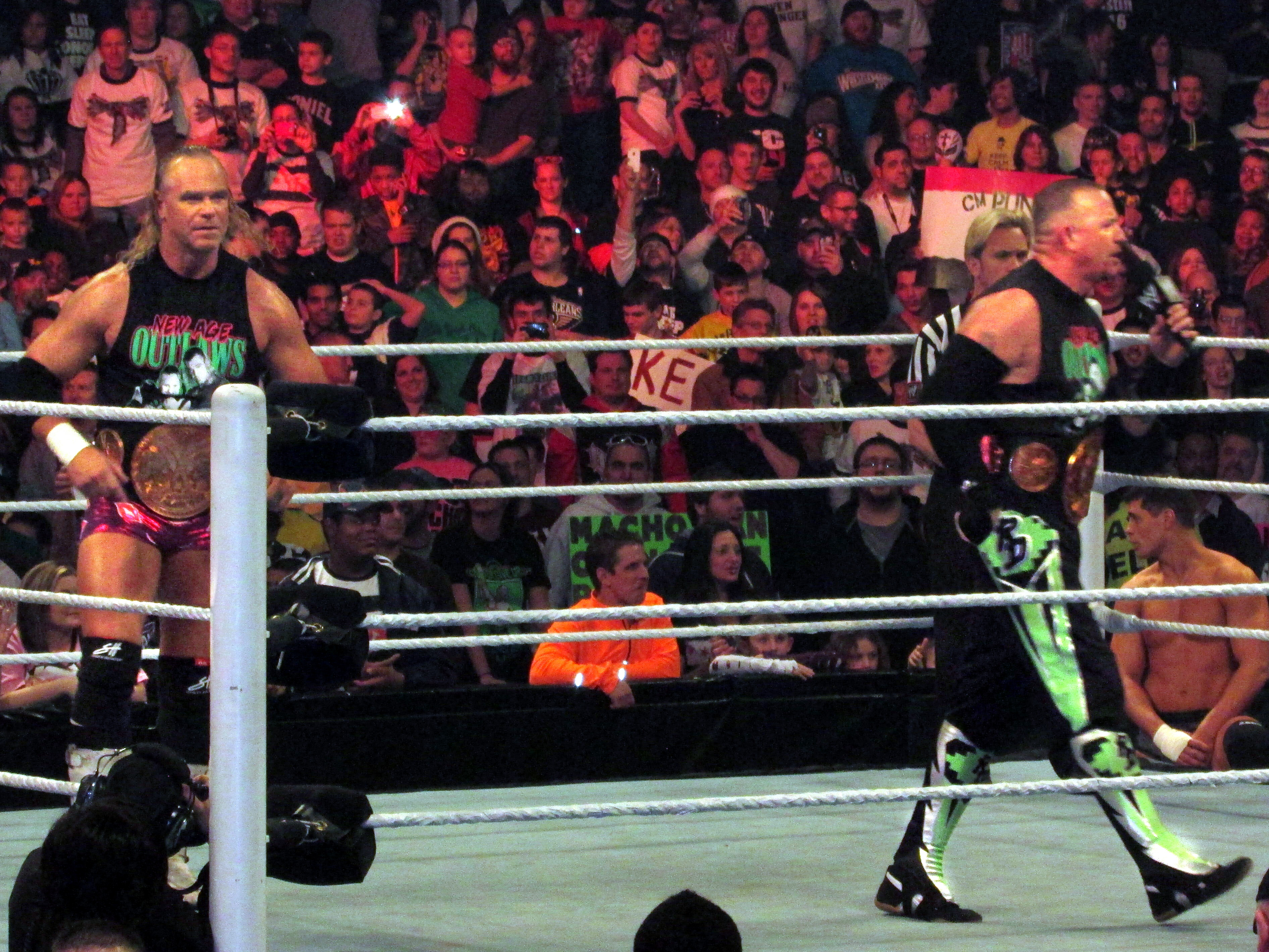
The New Age Outlaws as the WWE Tag Team Champions

Orton defeated Cena again in a rematch at Royal Rumble after interference by The Wyatt Family. At Elimination Chamber, Orton retained his title in the Elimination Chamber match by defeating Cena, Sheamus, Bryan, Christian and Cesaro. Bryan's feud with The Authority intensified due to Authority members getting involved in Bryan's matches. This led to Bryan challenging Triple H to a match at WrestleMania XXX, with Triple H initially refusing. Triple H finally accepting the challenge on the March 10 episode of Raw, after Bryan rallied dozens of his fans to occupy the ring. Triple H later added a stipulation where the winner of their match would be placed in the WWE World Heavyweight Championship later that night, making it a triple threat match. At WrestleMania XXX, Bryan defeated Triple H, and later that night, he defeated Orton and Batista to win the WWE World Heavyweight Championship.

The next night on Raw, Triple H challenged Bryan for the WWE World Heavyweight Championship, but after Bryan was attacked by Orton, Batista, and Kane before the match, The Shield having interfered, betrayed and attacked The Authority. As punishment, the following week on Raw, The Shield competed in an 11-on-3 handicap match, and after they were assaulted by all eleven superstars, the match was declared a no contest. Following the match, Orton, Batista, and Triple H reunited as Evolution and attacked The Shield. Meanwhile, Stephanie McMahon and Kane continued to feud with Bryan, with Kane returning to his masked self and attacking Bryan on the April 21 episode of Raw. At Extreme Rules, The Shield defeated Evolution and Bryan defeated Kane to retain his title.

The following night on Raw, Triple H forced Dean Ambrose to defend his United States Championship in a 20-man battle royal, with Ambrose being eliminated last by Sheamus, losing his title. The Authority began pressuring Bryan to give up the WWE World Heavyweight Championship as he suffered a legit neck injury and was not physically cleared to compete, but Bryan refused. At Payback, after threatening to "fire" Bryan's wife Brie Bella after Stephanie McMahon viewed Brie shoving her as "assault", Brie instead "quit" before slapping Stephanie. That same night, Evolution were once again defeated by The Shield in a No Holds Barred elimination six-man tag team match.

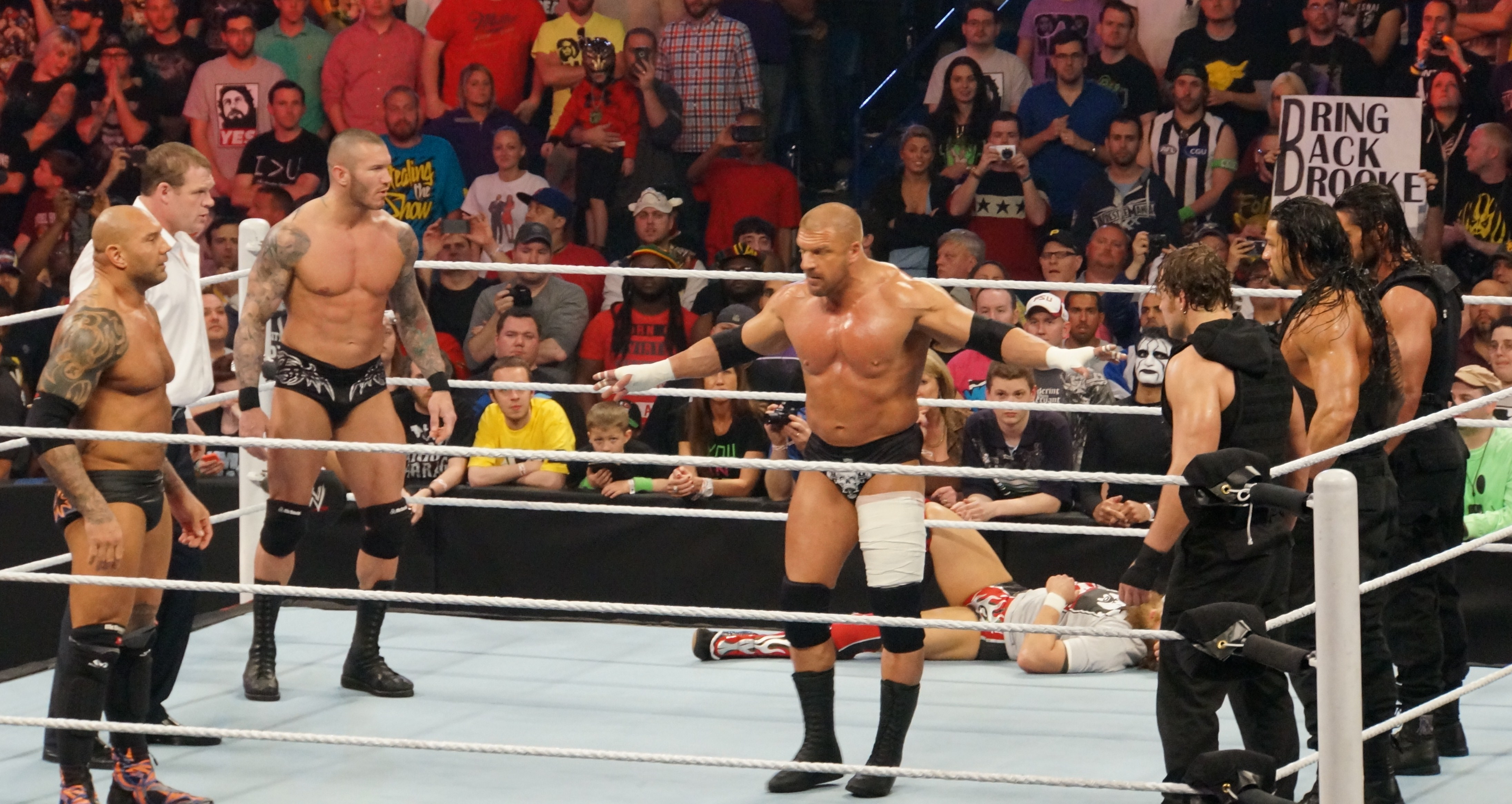
Evolution with Kane faced The Shield

The following night on Raw, Batista, frustrated with not receiving a proper one-on-one match for the WWE World Heavyweight Championship, "quit" WWE in the process for a second time. Later in the night, before a match between Roman Reigns and Randy Orton, Rollins was revealed as Triple's H "Plan B" when he attacked both Ambrose and Reigns with steel chairs, thus turning on The Shield and rejoining The Authority. On the June 9 episode of Raw, Bryan's doctor stated Bryan was not clear to compete yet; therefore, The Authority stripped Bryan of the title. That same night, The Authority created a six-man ladder match for the vacant WWE World Heavyweight Championship at Money in the Bank, with them adding Orton to the match. On the June 23 episode of Raw, The Authority also added Kane to the match. Meanwhile, Seth Rollins began to feud with former Shield teammate Dean Ambrose, and on the June 17 episode of Main Event, acting on behalf of The Authority, Rollins announced a traditional Money in the Bank ladder match, also naming himself as the first entrant. At the pay-per-view, Rollins won the Money in the Bank contract by defeating Ambrose, Dolph Ziggler, Kofi Kingston, Rob Van Dam and Jack Swagger; however, both Orton and Kane were unsuccessful in winning the WWE World Heavyweight Championship, which was won by Cena. At Battleground, Rollins defeated Ambrose by forfeit after Ambrose was ejected from the arena by Triple H and both Orton and Kane were once again unsuccessful in winning the title from Cena in a fatal four-way match, also involving Roman Reigns. On the August 11 episode of Raw, Kane resumed his role as Director of Operations after relinquishing his mask the previous week.

Bryan took time off from the WWE to recover from his injury, so Stephanie McMahon began feuding with The Bella Twins by constantly putting Nikki in handicap matches. Brie returned to WWE on the July 21 episode of Raw, appearing in the crowd as a fan, with Stephanie being arrested for battery after slapping Brie and for resisting arrest (kayfabe). That same night, Triple H chose Cena's opponent for the WWE World Heavyweight Championship at SummerSlam; after seemingly choosing Orton, Orton was attacked by Reigns. Brock Lesnar then made his return to WWE to align with The Authority and Triple H chose Lesnar to face Cena instead. At SummerSlam, Orton was defeated by Reigns; however, Rollins defeated Ambrose in a lumberjack match, Stephanie defeated Brie after Nikki turned on her sister and aligned herself with Stephanie, and Lesnar defeated Cena to win the WWE World Heavyweight Championship.

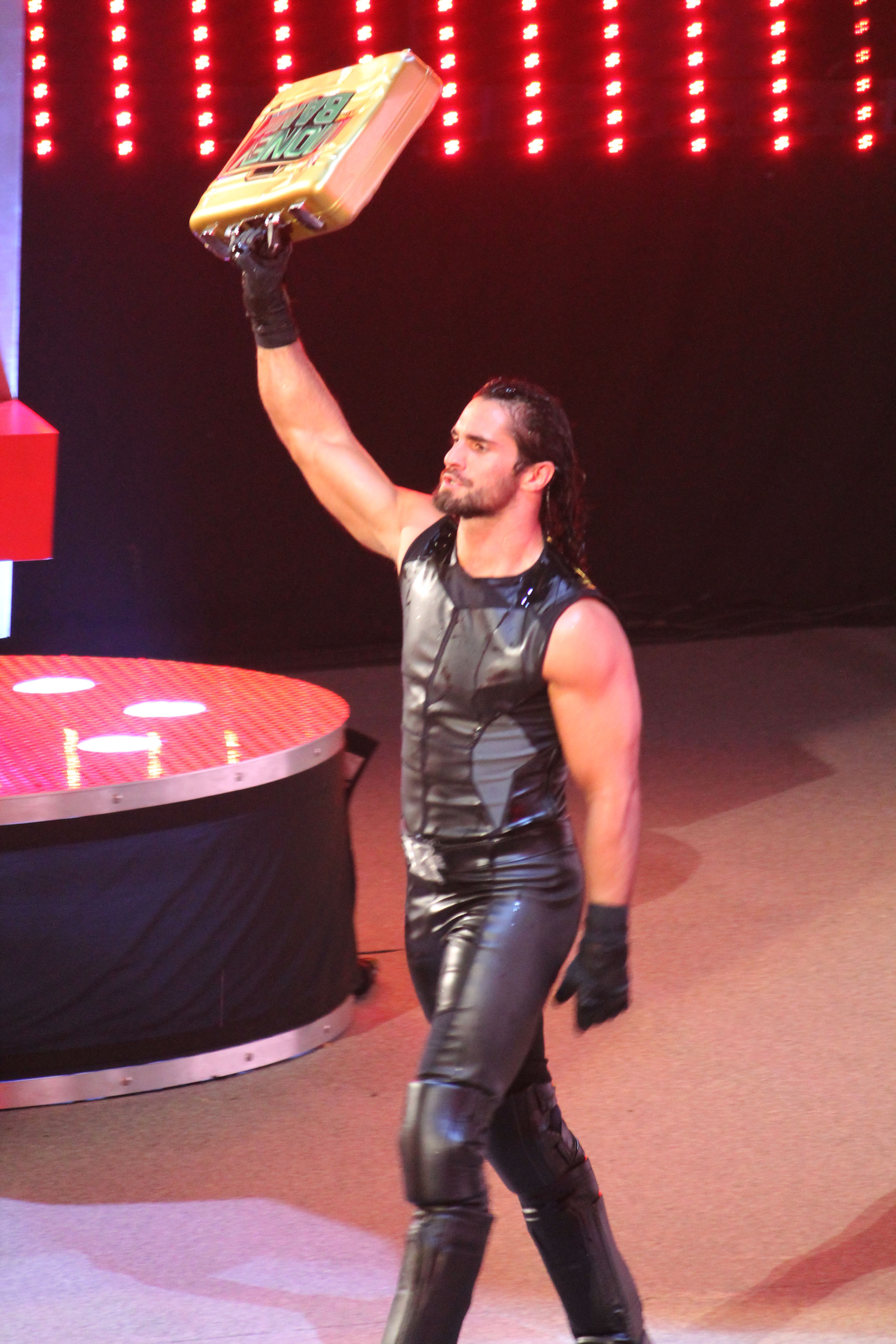
In June 2014, Seth Rollins betrayed his Shield teammates to align himself once again with The Authority

The following night on Raw, Rollins kayfabe injured Ambrose after being placed in a Falls Count Anywhere match following interference by Kane. This led to Rollins feuding with Reigns; however, Reigns legitimately suffered a hernia injury requiring surgery. At Night of Champions, Rollins declared himself winner by forfeit due to Reigns' injury, leading to Ambrose returning attempting to attack Rollins, though he would be escorted from the arena by security. Later on in the night, Rollins interfered in the WWE World Heavyweight Championship match between Lesnar and Cena, attempting to cash in his Money in the Bank contract, but was stopped by Cena before the bell rang and Lesnar remained the champion. In September, Joey Mercury and Jamie Noble were seen taking orders from Triple H and used in segments throughout the show. They were later confirmed to be working for The Authority, mainly being placed as personal security for Rollins known as J&J Security. Over the next few weeks, tension appeared between Orton and Rollins, with Rollins attacking Orton following one of his matches. At Hell in a Cell, Orton was defeated by Cena in a Hell in a Cell match; however, Rollins defeated Ambrose in another Hell in a Cell match following interference by Bray Wyatt.

The following night on the October 27 episode of Raw, Orton attacked Rollins to get revenge for Rollins attacking him before. Orton performed an RKO on Rollins, before defying The Authority. Later that night, The Authority tried to get Cena to join them, only for Cena to refuse. This led to Triple H challenging Cena to a traditional Survivor Series tag team elimination match at Survivor Series where if Team Authority lost the match, they would be out of power. At Survivor Series, Team Authority (Rollins, Kane, Mark Henry, Rusev and Luke Harper) faced Team Cena (Cena, Big Show, Dolph Ziggler, Erick Rowan and Ryback), where Team Authority lost after Sting made his WWE debut and interfered on Team Cena's behalf, giving them the victory and ending The Authority.

At TLC: Tables, Ladders and Chairs, Big Show defeated Erick Rowan in the first ever Steel Stairs match, but Kane was defeated by Ryback in a Chairs match and Rollins lost to Cena in a Tables match to determine the No. 1 contender for the WWE World Heavyweight Championship after interference from the returning Roman Reigns. On the December 29 episode of Raw, Rollins attacked guest hosts Christian and Edge, with the help of Big Show and J&J Security, and held Edge hostage. When Cena attempted a rescue, Rollins threatened to break Edge's neck unless Cena brought back The Authority. After Cena relented and aquiesced to Rollins' demand, Rollins, Big Show and J&J Security attacked Cena as Triple H and Stephanie McMahon, accompanied by Brock Lesnar and Paul Heyman, emerged onto the entrance ramp to celebrate their return.

=== 2015 ===
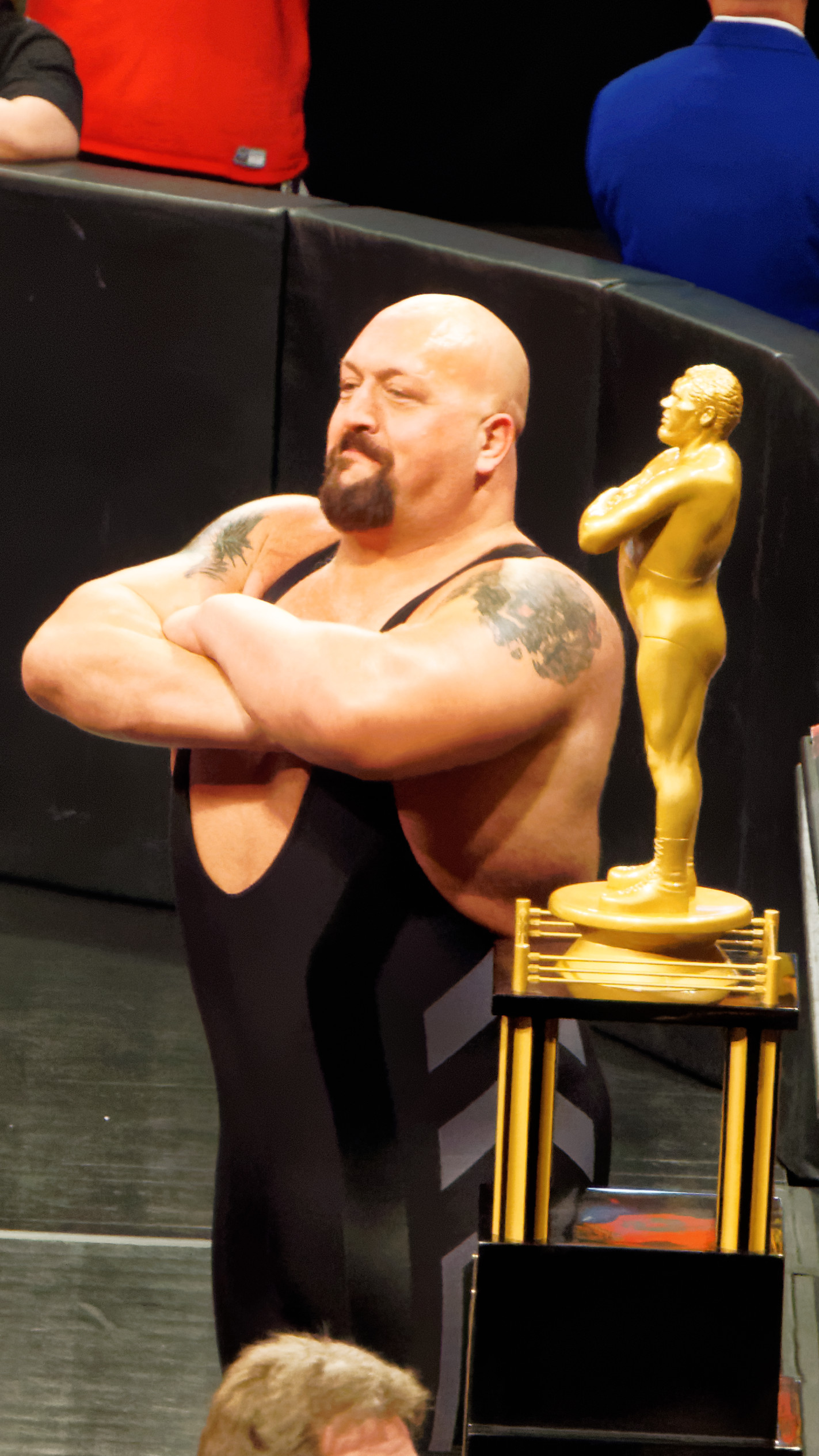
Big Show with the André the Giant Memorial Trophy

On the January 5 episode of Raw, The Authority punished each member of Team Cena; Ziggler was defeated by Bad News Barrett for the Intercontinental Championship in a two out of three falls match; Rowan was defeated by Harper, with J&J Security as special guest referees; and Ryback was defeated by Rollins and Kane in a handicap match. Later that night, The Authority, during what they called "John Cena Appreciation Night", invited Ziggler, Rowan and Ryback into the ring with Cena, only to (kayfabe) fire all three men. Cena then attempted to win their jobs back and was defeated by Rollins in a lumberjack match. On the January 19 episode of Raw, Cena defeated Rollins, Kane and Big Show in a 3-on-1 handicap match, once again with the help of Sting, thereby reinstating Ziggler, Rowan and Ryback's jobs.

At the Royal Rumble, Rollins was unsuccessful in winning the WWE World Heavyweight Championship from Lesnar in a triple threat match also involving Cena. In the Royal Rumble match, both Big Show and Kane were unsuccessful after Roman Reigns eliminated both men at the same time. At Fastlane, Rollins, Kane and Big Show defeated Ziggler, Rowan and Ryback in a six-man tag team match. Following the match, Randy Orton made his return, attacking J&J Security and Kane. Later that night, Triple H had a face to face confrontation with Sting, which ended in a brawl. Sting issued a challenge to Triple H for a match at WrestleMania 31, which Triple H accepted. The following night on Raw, The Authority attempted to persuade a returning Orton to rejoin them following his attack of Authority personnel, though Orton did not give a direct answer until the group met up backstage. Orton agreed to rejoin the stable, and he and Rollins were subsequently booked in a tag team match for later that night against Daniel Bryan and Roman Reigns. The loss Orton and Rollins suffered in the match further exacerbated tension between the two. The tension finally reached a head a few weeks later when Orton refused a tag from Rollins and left the ring during a match with Reigns, revealing that he only rejoined The Authority to get revenge on Rollins for his curb stomp. Orton then put Rollins through an announce table with an RKO.

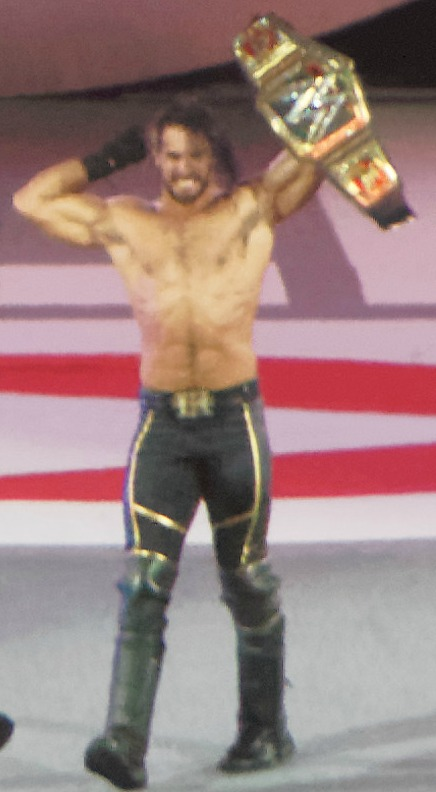
Rollins after winning the WWE World Heavyweight Championship at WrestleMania 31

At WrestleMania 31, The Authority scored several victories; Triple H defeated Sting in Sting's WWE debut match, and Big Show won the 30-man André the Giant Memorial battle royal. After losing his singles match against Orton earlier in the night, Rollins cashed his Money in the Bank contract during the main event between Brock Lesnar and Roman Reigns for the WWE World Heavyweight Championship, making it a triple threat match, becoming a world champion for the first time and bringing the title back to The Authority. Big Show took a brief hiatus from WWE afterwards, quietly leaving The Authority in the process. Rollins would defend the title at Extreme Rules against Orton in a steel cage match, and at Payback against Orton, Roman Reigns and Dean Ambrose.

Rollins began a feud with Ambrose, retaining the title at Elimination Chamber when Ambrose won the match by disqualification, and at Money in the Bank in a ladder match. On the June 15 episode of Raw, The Authority reinstated Brock Lesnar, who faced Rollins for the title at Battleground, where he retained the championship when The Undertaker interfered and attacked Lesnar, causing a disqualification in Lesnar's favor. At SummerSlam, Rollins faced John Cena in a "Winner Takes All" match where Cena's United States Championship was also on the line. Rollins was successful when Jon Stewart, the host of SummerSlam interfered on Rollins' behalf, thus making Rollins a double champion. At Night of Champions, Rollins lost the United States Championship back to Cena and retained the WWE World Heavyweight Championship against Sting, who suffered a legitimate neck injury in the match that would force him to retire early the following year. At the end of the night, Rollins was attacked by Kane. Upon returning to the Authority, Kane began playing mind games with Rollins and the Authority members, acting completely ignorant as to his actions at Night of Champions. He then ambushed and attacked Rollins on several occasions as Demon Kane, causing the Authority to grant Kane a WWE World Heavyweight Championship title match at Hell in a Cell, in which both Rollins' title and Kane's job as Director of Operations were at stake. Rollins retained the title and Kane was removed permanently from the Authority.

On November 4 at a live event in Dublin, during a match with Kane, Rollins suffered legitimate tears in his right ACL, MCL, and medial meniscus, and underwent surgery and would be out for 6–9 months. As a result, he was forced to vacate the WWE World Heavyweight Championship on November 5. On the following episode of Raw, Triple H started a feud with Roman Reigns when he offered the title and a spot in the stable as "Face of the Authority", but he declined the offer. At Survivor Series, after Reigns won the WWE World Heavyweight Championship during a tournament, Irish wrestler Sheamus cashed in his Money in the Bank contract and defeated him for the title. On the November 30 episode of Raw, Sheamus announced that he had formed his own stable called The League of Nations alongside English wrestler King Barrett, Mexican wrestler Alberto Del Rio, and Bulgarian wrestler Rusev. This new stable, composed of wrestlers who were born and became successful overseas, remained associates of The Authority while functioning as its own entity.

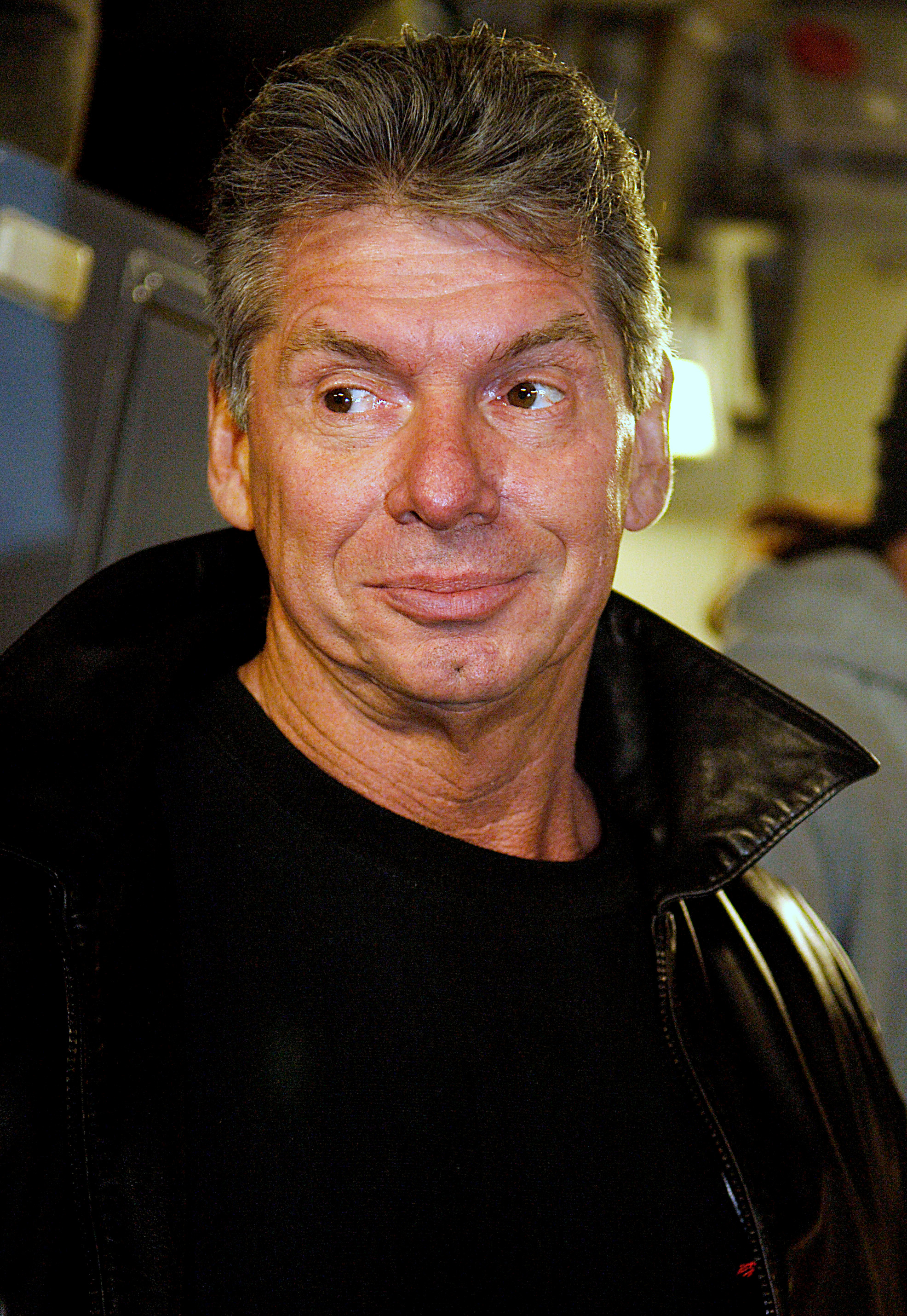
Mr. McMahon took temporary leadership of The Authority following Roman Reigns' attack on Triple H that left him out of action

At TLC: Tables, Ladders and Chairs, Sheamus retained the WWE World Heavyweight Championship against Roman Reigns in a Tables, Ladders and Chairs match. After the match, Reigns "snapped" following his loss and attacked Sheamus, Alberto Del Rio and Rusev. Triple H came to the ring to calm Reigns down and tend to Sheamus, but as he did so Reigns attacks him as well that left him injured and out of action in the storyline. Following Reigns's attack on Triple H, Mr. McMahon took temporary leadership of The Authority in Triple H's absence and gave Reigns a title match on Sheamus's request on the December 14 episode of Raw, but gave the stipulation that should Reigns fail to win the title, he would be fired (kayfabe). Despite McMahon and The League of Nations interfering on Sheamus's behalf, Reigns knocked out McMahon and pinned Sheamus to win back the WWE World Heavyweight Championship.

=== 2016–2017 ===
"And there's two types of people in this company. Those who have been castrated by HHH and Stephanie, and those who are going to be."

— Wrestling Observer writer Jeff Hamlin in March 2016, on the Authority's onscreen dominance

The Authority's 2016 last-ditch effort campaign began by forcing Roman Reigns to defend the WWE World Heavyweight Championship against Sheamus on the January 4, 2016 episode of Raw with Mr. McMahon serving as the special guest referee to ensure that Reigns would lose the championship. Despite McMahon's attempts to "screw" him during the match, Reigns retained after knocking out McMahon and corrupt referee Scott Armstrong. In retaliation, McMahon announced after the match that Reigns would defend his title against 29 other men in the Royal Rumble match at the Royal Rumble pay-per-view. At the event, Triple H made his return, got his revenge on Reigns by eliminating him, and won the Royal Rumble match and the WWE World Heavyweight Championship by lastly eliminating Dean Ambrose. On the February 22 episode of Raw, Mr. McMahon presented the "Vincent J. McMahon Legacy of Excellence" award to Stephanie. Before she could start her acceptance speech, Shane McMahon returned for the first time since 2009 and demanded to gain control of Raw, claiming The Authority was running the company to the ground. Mr. McMahon accepted the offer, only if he won one more match. Shane accepted, and Mr. McMahon announced he would wrestle at WrestleMania 32 against The Undertaker inside Hell in a Cell. Later that night, in the main event match between Reigns and Sheamus, Triple H came out and he and Reigns would start brawling outside the ring. Triple H proceeded to smash Reigns' face onto the announce table, (kayfabe) breaking Reigns' nose, and ending the attack with a Pedigree onto the steel steps.

On March 12 at Roadblock, Triple H successfully defended the title against Ambrose, securing his place in the main event of WrestleMania 32 against Reigns, to whom he lost the title on April 3. On the post-WrestleMania episode of Raw on April 4, Mr. McMahon opened the show to announce that his returning son, Shane McMahon, would run Raw for one night only. However, Shane continued to run Raw due to "overwhelming fan support" until the April 25 episode of Raw, when Stephanie McMahon returned to announce that Mr. McMahon would decide who'd permanently control Raw at Payback. Mr. McMahon announced that both Stephanie and Shane would run Raw together on a permanent basis, and The Authority became inactive. Triple H and Stephanie reunited against Seth Rollins at WrestleMania 33 in 2017 where Rollins defeated Triple H in a non-sanctioned match, but the two were not referred to as The Authority during this time.

=== 2018 ===
Following the inaugural women's Royal Rumble match at the 2018 Royal Rumble, former UFC star Ronda Rousey made an appearance, confirming she had signed full-time with WWE, and would sign her Raw contract at Elimination Chamber. At the event, Raw General Manager Kurt Angle, Stephanie, and Triple H introduced Rousey. Triple H confirmed that there were no special stipulations in Rousey's contract, but Rousey would have her debut match at WrestleMania 34. Angle, who Stephanie previously threatened to fire and who Triple H had turned on back at Survivor Series, then brought up the incident between The Authority and Rousey from WrestleMania 31 where Rousey had embarrassed them and Angle said that Triple H and Stephanie wanted to manipulate Rousey as revenge. This eventually lead to Rousey putting Triple H through a table, which caused Stephanie to slap Rousey, but ran before Rousey could attack her and Rousey signed her contract. This would be a silent reuniting of The Authority, setting up Triple H and Stephanie against Angle and Rousey in a mixed tag team match at WrestleMania 34, in which Angle and Rousey were victorious.

== Members ==
L	Leader
*	Founding member(s)

Name	Tenure	Notes
Triple H* (L)	August 18, 2013 – April 4, 2016	Kayfabe Chief Operating Officer of WWE. Joined after helping Randy Orton win the WWE Championship at SummerSlam 2013. Left after losing the WWE World Heavyweight Championship to Roman Reigns at WrestleMania 32
Stephanie McMahon* (L)	August 19, 2013 – April 4, 2016	WWE Chief Brand Officer Joined after Triple H helped Randy Orton win the WWE Championship at SummerSlam 2013 Left after Triple H lost the WWE World Heavyweight Championship to Roman Reigns at WrestleMania 32
Mr. McMahon (L)	December 14, 2015 – April 4, 2016	WWE chairman and WWE Chief Executive Officer; Joined after Triple H was injured at TLC: Tables, Ladders and Chairs; Left after putting Shane McMahon in charge of Raw
Randy Orton*	August 18, 2013– November 3, 2014; February 23, 2015 – March 9, 2015	Joined after cashing in his Money in the Bank contract briefcase at SummerSlam with help from Triple H Ejected from the group after turning on Seth Rollins; Rejoined as a ruse to attack Rollins as revenge for his earlier attacks on Orton
Dean Ambrose	August 19, 2013 – March 17, 2014	Joined as a member of The Shield; Left after turning on Kane
Roman Reigns	August 19, 2013 – March 17, 2014	Joined as a member of The Shield; Left after turning on Kane
Seth Rollins	August 19, 2013 – March 17, 2014; June 2, 2014 – November 5, 2015	Joined as a member of The Shield; Left after turning on Kane; Rejoined after betraying The Shield; Left after vacating the WWE World Heavyweight Championship following a knee injury
Scott Armstrong	September 15, 2013 – January 4, 2016	Joined as The Authority's crooked referee Left after failing to help Sheamus defeat Roman Reigns for the WWE World Heavyweight Championship
Kane	October 28, 2013 – October 25, 2015	Joined as The Authority's Director of Operations; Fired from his role as Director of Operations after losing to Seth Rollins at Hell in a Cell
Billy Gunn	January 13, 2014 – April 6, 2014	Joined as a member of The New Age Outlaws; Left after he, Road Dogg and Kane were defeated by The Shield at WrestleMania XXX
Road Dogg	January 13, 2014 – April 6, 2014	Joined as a member of The New Age Outlaws; Left after he, Billy Gunn and Kane were defeated by The Shield at WrestleMania XXX
Batista	April 7, 2014 – June 2, 2014	Joined as a member of Evolution; Left and quit WWE after Triple H denied him a shot at the WWE World Heavyweight Championship against Daniel Bryan
Joey Mercury	September 19, 2014 – July 6, 2015	Joined as a member of J&J Security; Left after being injured by Brock Lesnar
Jamie Noble	September 19, 2014 – July 6, 2015	Joined as a member of J&J Security; Left after being injured by Brock Lesnar
Big Show	November 23, 2014 – April 26, 2015	Joined after turning on John Cena at Survivor Series; Left after losing to Roman Reigns at Extreme Rules

== Sub-groups ==
Affiliate	Members	Tenure	Type
The Shield	Dean Ambrose; Roman Reigns; Seth Rollins	August 19, 2013 – March 17, 2014	Trio
The New Age Outlaws	Road Dogg; Billy Gunn	January 13, 2014 – April 6, 2014	Tag-team
Evolution	Triple H Randy Orton; Batista	April 14, 2014 – June 2, 2014	Trio
Big Show and Kane	Big Show; Kane	November 23, 2014 – April 26, 2015	Tag-team
J&J Security	Joey Mercury; Jamie Noble	September 19, 2014 – July 6, 2015	Tag-team

== Championships and accomplishments ==
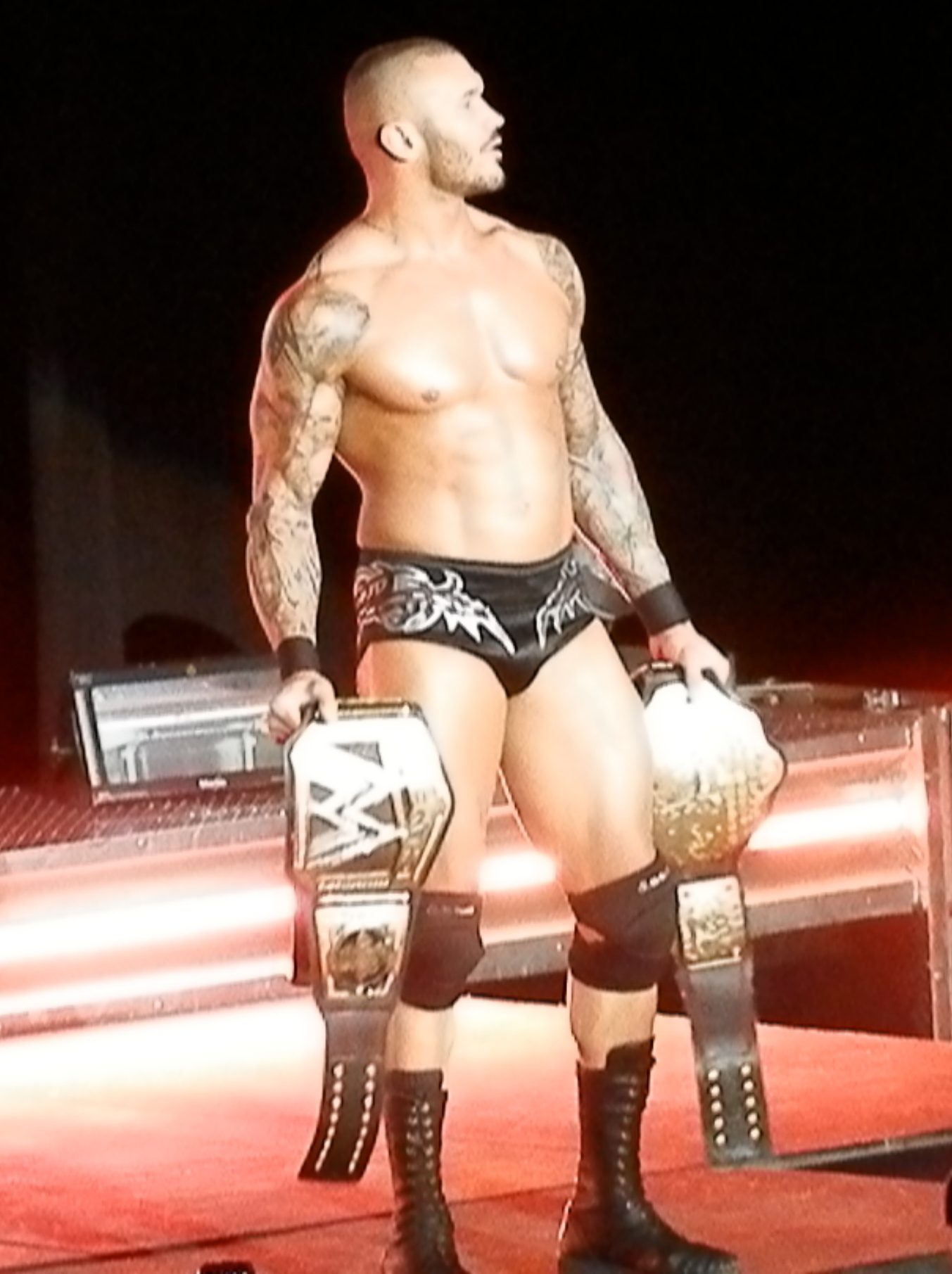
As member of The Authority, Orton unified the WWE Championship with the World Heavyweight Championship into the WWE World Heavyweight Championship

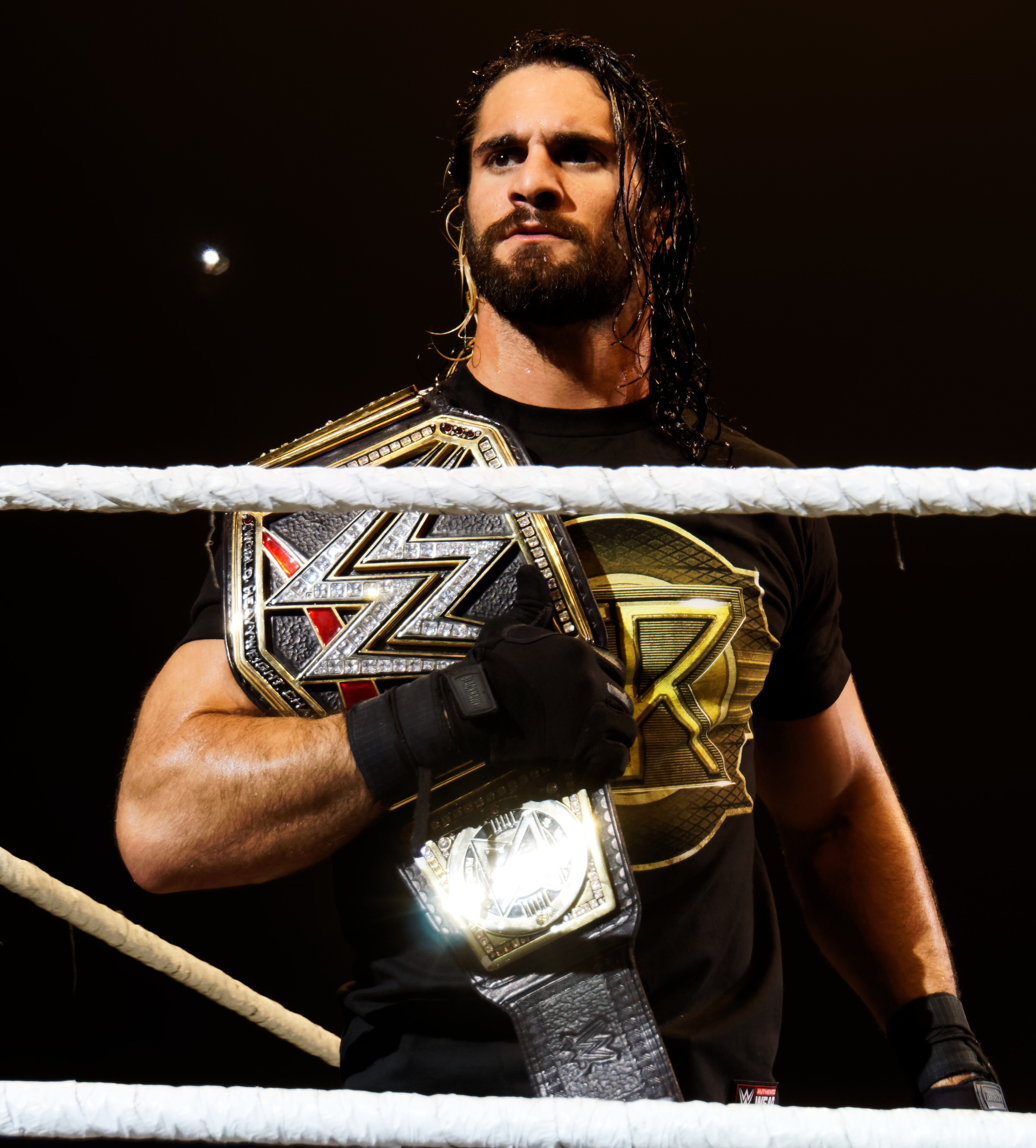
By November 2014, Rollins took Orton's place as the hand-picked "future of the business", and at WrestleMania 31 he cashed-in his Money in the Bank contract to win the WWE World Heavyweight Championship back to The Authority

- Pro Wrestling Illustrated
  - Feud of the Year (2013) – The Authority (vs. Daniel Bryan)
  - Feud of the Year (2014) – Seth Rollins (vs. Dean Ambrose)
  - Most Hated Wrestler of the Year (2013) – The Authority
  - Most Hated Wrestler of the Year (2014) – Triple H and Stephanie McMahon
  - Most Hated Wrestler of the Year (2015) – Seth Rollins
  - Tag Team of the Year (2013) – The Shield (Roman Reigns and Seth Rollins)
  - Wrestler of the Year (2015) – Seth Rollins
  - Ranked Seth Rollins No. 1 of the top 500 singles wrestlers in the PWI 500 in 2015
- WWE
  - World Heavyweight Championship (1 time) – Randy Orton
  - WWE Tag Team Championship (2 times) – The Shield (Roman Reigns and Seth Rollins), The New Age Outlaws (Billy Gunn and Road Dogg)
  - WWE United States Championship (2 times) – Dean Ambrose (1), Seth Rollins (1)
  - WWE World Heavyweight Championship^{1} (4 times) – Randy Orton (2), Seth Rollins (1), Triple H (1)
  - André the Giant Memorial Trophy (2015) – Big Show
  - Royal Rumble (2016) – Triple H
  - Money in the Bank (2014) – Seth Rollins
  - Vincent J. McMahon Legacy of Excellence Award (2016) – Stephanie McMahon
  - Slammy Award (9 times)
    - Breakout Star of the Year (2013) – The Shield (Dean Ambrose, Seth Rollins, and Roman Reigns)
    - Faction of the Year (2013) – The Shield
    - Fan Participation (2014) – Seth Rollins for "You Sold Out"
    - Insult of the Year (2013) – Stephanie McMahon for insulting Big Show
    - Match of the Year (2014) – Team Cena vs. Team Authority at Survivor Series
    - Rivalry of the Year (2014) vs. Daniel Bryan
    - Superstar of the Year (2015) – Seth Rollins
    - Trending Now Hashtag of the Year (2013) – The Shield for #BelieveInTheShield
    - "What a Maneuver" of the Year (2013) – Roman Reigns for the Spear
- Wrestling Observer Newsletter
  - Best Booker (2015) – Triple H (with Ryan Ward)
  - Most Improved (2013) – Roman Reigns
  - Most Overrated (2013) – Randy Orton
  - Most Overrated (2014) – Kane
  - Tag Team of the Year (2013) – The Shield (Roman Reigns and Seth Rollins)
  - Worst Feud of the Year (2013) – vs. Big Show

1 Orton's first reign and the beginning of his second reign were when the title was still known as the WWE Championship.
