= TLC: Tables, Ladders & Chairs (2015) =

WWE pay-per-view and livestreaming event

- Promotional poster featuring Roman Reigns
- Promotion: WWE
- Date: December 13, 2015
- City: Boston, Massachusetts
- Venue: TD Garden
- Attendance: 14,903
- Buy rate: 39,000 (excluding WWE Network views)

WWE event chronology
← Previous; Survivor Series	Next → NXT TakeOver: London

TLC: Tables, Ladders & Chairs chronology
← Previous; 2014	Next → 2016

The 2015 TLC: Tables, Ladders & Chairs was a professional wrestling pay-per-view (PPV) and livestreaming event produced by WWE. It was the seventh annual TLC: Tables, Ladders & Chairs and took place on December 13, 2015, at the TD Garden in Boston, Massachusetts. This was the last TLC event held before the reintroduction of the brand extension in July 2016. The concept of the show was based around the primary matches of the card each utilizing tables, ladders, and chairs as legal weapons.

Eight matches were contested at the event, including one on the Kickoff pre-show. In the main event, Sheamus defeated Roman Reigns in a Tables, Ladders, and Chairs match to retain the WWE World Heavyweight Championship. In other prominent matches, Dean Ambrose defeated Kevin Owens to win the WWE Intercontinental Championship, and in the opening match, The New Day (Big E and Kofi Kingston) defeated The Lucha Dragons (Kalisto and Sin Cara) and The Usos (Jey Uso and Jimmy Uso) to retain the WWE Tag Team Championship.

== Production ==
=== Background ===
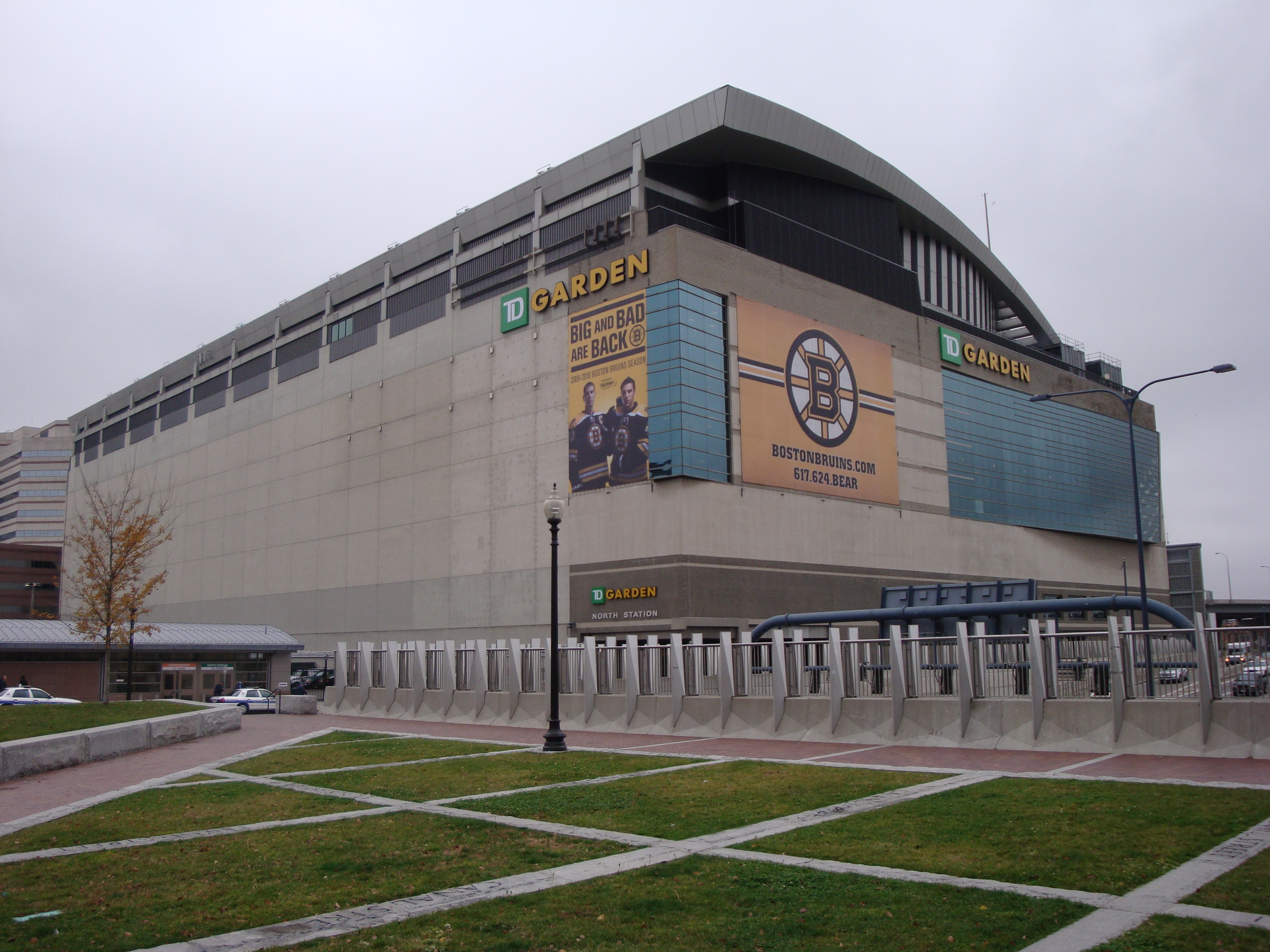
The seventh annual TLC: Tables, Ladders & Chairs was held at the TD Garden in Boston, Massachusetts.

TLC: Tables, Ladders & Chairs was an annual professional wrestling event produced every December by WWE since 2009. It was originally broadcast exclusively via pay-per-view (PPV) before it began simultaneously livestreaming on the WWE Network in 2014. The concept of the event was based on the primary matches of the card each containing a stipulation using tables, ladders, and chairs as legal weapons, with the main event generally being a Tables, Ladders, and Chairs match. The seventh TLC event was scheduled to take place on December 13, 2015, at the TD Garden in Boston, Massachusetts.

=== Storylines ===
The event comprised eight matches, including one on the Kickoff pre-show, that resulted from scripted storylines. Results were predetermined by WWE's writers, while storylines were produced on WWE's weekly television shows, Raw and SmackDown.

At Survivor Series, Roman Reigns defeated Dean Ambrose in a tournament final to win the vacant WWE World Heavyweight Championship, but Sheamus then cashed in his Money in the Bank contract and defeated Reigns to win the title. The following night on Raw, Sheamus was scheduled to defend the championship against Reigns in a Tables, Ladders, and Chairs match at the event. On the November 30 episode of Raw, Reigns received an early title match, in which he would win the title if he could defeat Sheamus in under 5:15; Reigns won the match by disqualification, but he did not win the title.

On the November 26 episode of SmackDown, Dean Ambrose defeated Tyler Breeze and Dolph Ziggler in a triple threat match to earn an Intercontinental Championship match against Kevin Owens at the event.

On the November 30 episode of Raw, The Lucha Dragons (Kalisto and Sin Cara) and The Usos (Jey Uso and Jimmy Uso) faced in a number-one contender's match for The New Day's (Kofi Kingston, Xavier Woods, and Big E) WWE Tag Team Championships, where The New Day attacked both teams, causing a double-disqualification. Stephanie McMahon decided that, because neither team lost, both would challenge the champions in a triple threat tag team ladder match at the event.

At Survivor Series, Charlotte defeated Paige via submission to retain the WWE Divas Championship. On the following night on Raw, Paige argued that Charlotte had cheated to retain the title, and received a rematch, which ended in a double countout. Following this, another rematch was scheduled for TLC.

On the November 23 episode of Raw, Bray Wyatt and Luke Harper defeated The Dudley Boyz (Bubba Ray Dudley and D-Von Dudley). The Dudley Boyz then defeated Braun Strowman and Erick Rowan on the next episode of SmackDown. The next week on Raw, Tommy Dreamer returned to WWE and joined The Dudley Boyz, after which, the two groups fought to a no contest. On the December 3 of SmackDown, Wyatt defeated D-Von Dudley. On the December 7 episode of Raw, Rhyno returned to WWE, joining The Dudleyz, after which an eight-man tag team elimination tables match pitting The Dudleyz, Dreamer, and Rhyno against The Wyatt Family (Wyatt, Rowan, Harper, and Strowman) was scheduled for the event.

On the November 30 episode of Raw, Ryback interrupted Lana's return and defeated Rusev by countout in an impromptu match. After a rematch the following week on Raw, which ended in a double countout, a match was scheduled between the two at the event.

At Hell in a Cell, Alberto Del Rio made his return to WWE to win his first United States Championship, while joining forces with manager Zeb Colter, leading to confrontations with Colter's former protege, Jack Swagger. After Del Rio ended his association with Colter on the December 7 episode of Raw, a title defense against Swagger in a chairs match was scheduled to take place at the event.

== Event ==
Other on-screen personnel
Role:	Name:
English commentators	Michael Cole
English commentators	John "Bradshaw" Layfield
English commentators	Jerry Lawler
English commentators	Xavier Woods (opening match only)
Spanish commentators	Carlos Cabrera
Spanish commentators	Marcelo Rodríguez
Interviewers	Tom Phillips
Interviewers	JoJo
Ring announcers	Lilian Garcia
Ring announcers	Eden Stiles
Referees	Darrick Moore
Referees	Chad Patton
Referees	Jason Ayers
Referees	John Cone
Referees	Ryan Tran
Referees	Rod Zapata
Referees	Dan Engler
Referees	Mike Chioda
Pre-show panel	Renee Young
Pre-show panel	Byron Saxton
Pre-show panel	Corey Graves
Pre-show panel	Booker T

=== Pre-show ===
During the TLC: Tables, Ladders & Chairs Kickoff pre-show, Sasha Banks faced Becky Lynch. In the end, Lynch applied the Dis-Arm-Her on Banks but Tamina distracted the referee whilst Naomi kicked Becky. Banks forced Lynch to submit to the Banks Statement to win the match.

=== Preliminary matches ===
The actual pay-per-view event opened with The New Day's Big E and Kofi Kingston defending the WWE Tag Team Championship against The Usos (Jey Uso and Jimmy Uso) and The Lucha Dragons (Kalisto and Sin Cara) in a triple threat tag team ladder match. During the match, Kingston - with the help of Big E - dropkicked a ladder into Jey Uso, who was seated in the ring corner. Big E then executed an Overhead Belly to Belly Suplex into the ladder on Jimmy Uso. Later in the match, Jimmy and Jey dropkicked a ladder into Big E. Jimmy performed a Running Hip Attack into a ladder which Jey held against Kingston, who was hung in the Tree of Woe. Kalisto performed a Salida Del Sol on Jey through a ladder bridged between another ladder and the ring ropes. The match ended when Xavier Woods threw his trombone at Kalisto, who was about to retrieve the title belts. Kingston retrieved the belts to retain the titles.

Next, Rusev faced Ryback. In the end, Ryback attempted Shell Shocked on Rusev but Rusev countered the move and performed a Roundhouse Kick on Ryback. Rusev applied the Accolade on Ryback, who passed out, giving Rusev the win.

After that, Alberto Del Rio defended the United States Championship against Jack Swagger in a Chairs match. During the match, Swagger attempted a Swagger Bomb on Del Rio but Del Rio countered with a chair shot to Swagger's midsection. Swagger applied a Patriot Lock whilst Del Rio's ankle was trapped inside a chair but Del Rio escaped the hold. The match ended when Del Rio executed a Diving Double Foot Stomp on Swagger, who was hung in the Tree of Woe, onto a pile of chairs and pinned Swagger to retain the championship.

In the fourth match, The Wyatt Family (Bray Wyatt, Luke Harper, Erick Rowan, and Braun Strowman) faced The ECW Originals (Bubba Ray Dudley, D-Von Dudley, Tommy Dreamer, and Rhyno) in an eight-man tag team elimination tables match. Erick Rowan was eliminated after Bubba Ray and D-Von put him through a table with a 3D. Rhyno was eliminated by Harper after getting hit by a Big Boot causing Rhyno to fall through a table. D-Von was eliminated by Wyatt after a Uranage Slam through a table. Dreamer was eliminated after Harper performed a Suicide Dive on Dreamer, pushing him through a table. Bubba Ray poured lighter fluid on a table but Strowman put him through a table with a Chokeslam to win the match for The Wyatt Family.

Next, Kevin Owens defended the Intercontinental Championship against Dean Ambrose. During the match, Ambrose performed a Suicide Dive on Owens and attempted a Rebound Lariat but Owens countered with a Fallaway Slam into the barricade on Ambrose, which he followed by a Running Senton. Owens performed a Super Rolling Fireman's Carry Slam on Ambrose for a near-fall. Owens attempted a Pop Up Powerbomb but Ambrose countered the move and executed Dirty Deeds. Ambrose pinned Owens but Owens placed a finger on the bottom rope to void the pinfall. In the end, Owens attempted a Pop Up Powerbomb but Ambrose countered with a Hurricanrana and pinned Owens with a roll-up to win the title.

In the sixth match, Charlotte (with Ric Flair) defended the WWE Divas Championship against Paige. During the match, Paige performed a Ram-Paige on Charlotte but Ric Flair placed Charlotte's foot on the bottom rope to void the pinfall. The match ended when Charlotte removed the cover from a turnbuckle and tripped Paige into the exposed turnbuckle, pinning Paige to retain the title.

=== Main event ===
In the main event, Sheamus defended the WWE World Heavyweight Championship against Roman Reigns in a Tables, Ladders, and Chairs match. During the match, Reigns threw Sheamus into chairs set up on tables near the entrance way. Reigns attempted a Powerbomb on Sheamus but Sheamus countered with a Back Body Drop through a table, followed by a Drop Suplex through another table and White Noise off the steel steps through another table. Sheamus attempted a Rolling Fireman's Carry Slam but Reigns countered the move and executed a Deadlift Powerbomb onto a ladder on Sheamus, followed by a Samoan Drop through a ladder bridged between the ring and a broadcast table. Reigns knocked Sheamus off a ladder with a Superman Punch, causing Sheamus to fall through a table. In the climax, Reigns attempted to retrieve the title belt but Rusev and Alberto Del Rio pulled him off the ladder; Del Rio performed a Superkick on Reigns. Reigns executed Superman Punches on Rusev and Del Rio and pulled Sheamus off the ladder but Sheamus executed a Brogue Kick on Reigns. Sheamus retrieved the belt to retain the title.

After the match, Sheamus, Rusev, and Del Rio were celebrating until Reigns performed a double Spear on Rusev and Del Rio and attacked Sheamus with a chair. Triple H, Stephanie McMahon, and WWE officials attempted to calm down Reigns, who, however, attacked Triple H with a Superman Punch, several chair shots, and a Powerbomb on a broadcast table, ending the attack with an Elbow Drop through the broadcast table. As medical personnel attempted to help Triple H out, Reigns delivered a Spear to Triple H.

== Reception ==
The event received generally mixed reviews from critics, though it was considered a major improvement from the previous pay-per-view.

James Caldwell of Pro Wrestling Torch reviewed the event's matches out of 5 stars: the tag title opener received 4.25 stars with "a lot of chaos and crash & burn'ing", and "Kalisto's Salida del Sol off the ladder was the highlight of the match." The U.S. title match and the Intercontinental title match also received the same rating, the former having Del Rio "solid in victory" while "no one seemed to think Swagger had a chance of winning", while for the latter was a "solid match, but not long enough to get to that next level." Ryback-Rusev received 2 stars: "Just a placeholder that didn't seem to move either guy since Ryback keeps losing and Rusev isn't taken seriously anymore." Two matches were unrated: the tables match, where "the hardcore team was just there to help re-establish the Wyatts after the Wyatts went through a series of big losses", and the women's match, where Ric Flair "was a distraction from whatever match they were trying to have between two unlikable characters with no sympathy for Paige." Lastly, the main event was rated 3 stars, as Roman Reigns and Sheamus "tried hard, but the crowd just wasn't into either guy at the main event level."

Nick Tylwalk of Canadian Online Explorer wrote that "TLC sends the year out on a blah note for the WWE". The event was rated 6.5/10, as "an acceptable though uninspiring affair that at least seemed to get some new fans cheering for Reigns before the show faded to black." The best rated match was the tag title match at 8.5/10, the worst being Rusev-Ryback at 5/10: "the expressionless face emoji sign in the crowd says it all." For the other matches, Del Rio-Swagger was rated 6/10, the tables match 7/10, Ambrose-Owens 7.5/10 and Charlotte-Paige 5.5/10. The main event, "featuring the least inspiring pairing since the promotion's two top titles were combined into one" and eventually "overshadowed by what followed", was rated 6.5/10: "That it won't go down as anyone's favorite was hardly surprising, though it wasn't for a lack of effort on the part of the wrestlers."

Will Pruett of Pro Wrestling Dot Net gave the show a rating of "B−", saying that even though it was "a really good live special with two standout matches bookending it", "the grade was hurt by the storytelling going in and some of the middling-to-bad matches." The main event was "a great TLC match", and when Reigns "got angry" and "sought vengeance" post-match, Pruett praised it as Reigns "seemed to finally find himself after a year of searching". However, Pruett was "confused" when Reigns beat down Triple H twice, going "from a sympathetic release of frustrations to being the true aggressor in the situation ... One has to wonder who the good guy in this feud actually is." The ladder match was "frenetic, entertaining, dynamic, and fun", but it could not mask that "this was a Ladder Match for the sake of having a Ladder Match because December [is] the month where Ladder Matches happen". For the other matches, Del Rio and Swagger had the "best" chairs match Pruett had seen, though "the bar wasn't high". Also, the tables match was "clumsy" and the women's match was poorly wrestled.

== Aftermath ==
On the following night's episode of Raw, Roman Reigns was confronted by Stephanie McMahon and Mr. McMahon. After Reigns refused to apologize, Sheamus came to request a match with Reigns that night, putting his WWE World Heavyweight Championship on the line. Mr. McMahon made the match official under the condition that if Reigns failed to win the title, he would be fired. Despite interference from McMahon and The League of Nations, Reigns pinned Sheamus to win his second WWE World Heavyweight Championship. Reigns was then forced to defend the title in the 30-man Royal Rumble match at the Royal Rumble as the first entrant.

Also on Raw, after losing the Intercontinental Championship, Kevin Owens interfered in a match between new champion Dean Ambrose and Dolph Ziggler and attacked both men, ending the match in disqualification. On Tuesday, December 22, during the live special SuperSmackDown, Ambrose retained the Intercontinental Championship after defeating Ziggler and Owens in a triple threat match. Ambrose retained the Intercontinental Championship against Owens on the January 7, 2016, episode of SmackDown after their match ended in a double countout. On the January 14 episode of SmackDown, Ambrose challenged Owens to a Last Man Standing match for the Intercontinental Championship at Royal Rumble, which Owens accepted.

On the December 14 episode of Raw, The Wyatt Family defeated The Dudley Boyz, Tommy Dreamer, and Rhyno, in an Extreme Rules match. On the December 21 episode of Raw, The Dudley Boyz and Dreamer faced The Wyatt Family, this time with Kane in a losing effort. The Dudley Boyz lost once again to the Wyatts on the following night's live special SuperSmackDown, while teaming with Kane and Ryback.

Charlotte's heel persona continued to strain her friendship with Becky Lynch after the event. On the following night's Raw, Charlotte and Becky defeated Brie Bella and Alicia Fox after Ric Flair's interference allowed Becky to lock Alicia in submission for the win. On the December 17 episode of SmackDown, Becky defeated Brie by submission due to interference by Charlotte. On the special SuperSmackDown show, Charlotte defeated Bella by submission while also leaving Becky to be assaulted by Team B.A.D. On the January 4, 2016, episode of Raw, Becky defeated Charlotte by roll-up despite Ric Flair interfering on his daughter's behalf. After the match Charlotte attacked Becky, turning both her and her father into villains. Charlotte defeated Becky with help from Flair to retain the Divas Championship on the January 7 episode of SmackDown. Another title match between Lynch and Charlotte was then scheduled for the Royal Rumble. This was the last TLC event to feature the Divas Championship as it was retired and replaced by a new WWE Women's Championship during the WrestleMania 32 pre-show in April 2016.

The 2015 event would be the last TLC event held before the reintroduction of the brand extension in July 2016, which again split WWE's main roster between the Raw and SmackDown brands where wrestlers were exclusively assigned to perform. The 2016 event was in turn held exclusively for wrestlers from the SmackDown brand division. This was also the last TLC event to feature the Divas Championship as it was retired and replaced by a new WWE Women's Championship during the WrestleMania 32 pre-show in April 2016.

== Results ==
No.	Results	Stipulations	Times
1^{P}	Sasha Banks (with Naomi and Tamina) defeated Becky Lynch by submission	Singles match	11:30
2	The New Day (Big E and Kofi Kingston) (c) (with Xavier Woods) defeated The Lucha Dragons (Kalisto and Sin Cara) and The Usos (Jey Uso and Jimmy Uso)	Triple threat tag team ladder match for the WWE Tag Team Championship	17:45
3	Rusev (with Lana) defeated Ryback by technical submission	Singles match	7:58
4	Alberto Del Rio (c) defeated Jack Swagger by pinfall	Chairs match for the WWE United States Championship	11:10
5	The Wyatt Family (Braun Strowman, Bray Wyatt, Erick Rowan, and Luke Harper) defeated The ECW Originals (Bubba Ray Dudley, D-Von Dudley, Rhyno, and Tommy Dreamer)^{1}	Eight-man elimination tables match	12:26
6	Dean Ambrose defeated Kevin Owens (c) by pinfall	Singles match for the WWE Intercontinental Championship	9:53
7	Charlotte (c) (with Ric Flair) defeated Paige by pinfall	Singles match for the WWE Divas Championship	10:38
8	Sheamus (c) defeated Roman Reigns	Tables, Ladders, and Chairs match for the WWE World Heavyweight Championship	23:55
(c) / – the champion(s) heading into the match; P / – the match was broadcast on the pre-show

Elimination tables match eliminations

^1

Eliminated	Wrestler	Team	Eliminated By	Method of elimination	Time
1	Erick Rowan	The Wyatt Family	Bubba Ray Dudley & D-Von Dudley	3D	03:55
2	Rhyno	The ECW Originals	Luke Harper	Big boot	06:25
3	D-Von Dudley	The ECW Originals	Bray Wyatt	Side slam	08:26
4	Tommy Dreamer	The ECW Originals	Luke Harper	Suicide dive	10:41
5	Bubba Ray Dudley	The ECW Originals	Braun Strowman	Chokeslam	12:26
Winner(s):	Bray Wyatt, Luke Harper, & Braun Strowman (The Wyatt Family)		—N/a		12:26
