= Survivor Series (2015) =

WWE pay-per-view and livestreaming event

- Promotional poster featuring The Undertaker
- Promotion: WWE
- Date: November 22, 2015
- City: Atlanta, Georgia
- Venue: Philips Arena
- Attendance: 14,481
- Buy rate: 57,000 (excluding WWE Network views)
- Tagline: There Is No Greater Survivor

WWE event chronology
| ← Previous; Hell in a Cell | Next → TLC: Tables, Ladders & Chairs |

Survivor Series chronology
| ← Previous; 2014 | Next → 2016 |

The 2015 Survivor Series was a professional wrestling pay-per-view (PPV) and livestreaming event produced by WWE. It was the 29th annual Survivor Series and took place on November 22, 2015, at Philips Arena in Atlanta, Georgia, which was the first Survivor Series held in the U.S. state of Georgia. The event was highlighted by the titular Survivor Series match, a tag team elimination match that pits teams of multiple wrestlers against each other. The event also celebrated The Undertaker's 25th anniversary in WWE, his debut occurring at the 1990 Survivor Series.

Nine matches were contested at the event, including one on the Kickoff pre-show. In the main event, Roman Reigns defeated Dean Ambrose to win the vacant WWE World Heavyweight Championship; however, immediately after the match, Sheamus cashed in his Money in the Bank contract and defeated Reigns to win the title. In another prominent match, The Undertaker teamed with Kane, thus reuniting The Brothers of Destruction, and defeated The Wyatt Family (Bray Wyatt and Luke Harper). There were also two Survivor Series matches, one on the pre-show and the other on the main card.

This was the last Survivor Series event to be held before the reintroduction of the brand extension in July 2016. The 2016 event subsequently introduced a brand competition theme, as such, this was the final Survivor Series event until the 2022 event to not carry the brand supremacy theme.

== Production ==
=== Background ===
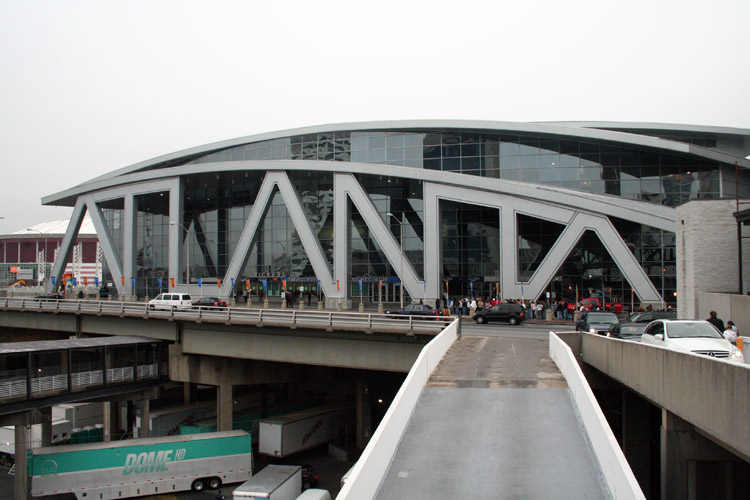
The 29th annual Survivor Series event was held at the Philips Arena in Atlanta, Georgia.

Survivor Series is an annual professional wrestling event, produced every November by WWE since 1987, generally held around Thanksgiving in the United States. It was originally broadcast exclusively via pay-per-view (PPV) before it began simultaneously livestreaming on the WWE Network in 2014. In what has become the second longest-running PPV event in history (behind WWE's WrestleMania), it is one of the promotion's original four PPVs, along with WrestleMania, SummerSlam, and Royal Rumble, referred to as the "Big Four". The event is traditionally characterized by having Survivor Series matches, which are tag team elimination matches that typically pits teams of four or five wrestlers against each other. Announced on July 13, 2015, the 29th Survivor Series event was scheduled to be held on November 22, 2015, at Philips Arena in Atlanta, Georgia, which was the first Survivor Series held in the U.S. state of Georgia.

=== Storylines ===
The event comprised nine matches, including one on the Kickoff pre-show, that resulted from scripted storylines. Results were predetermined by WWE's writers, while storylines were produced on WWE's weekly television shows, Raw and SmackDown.

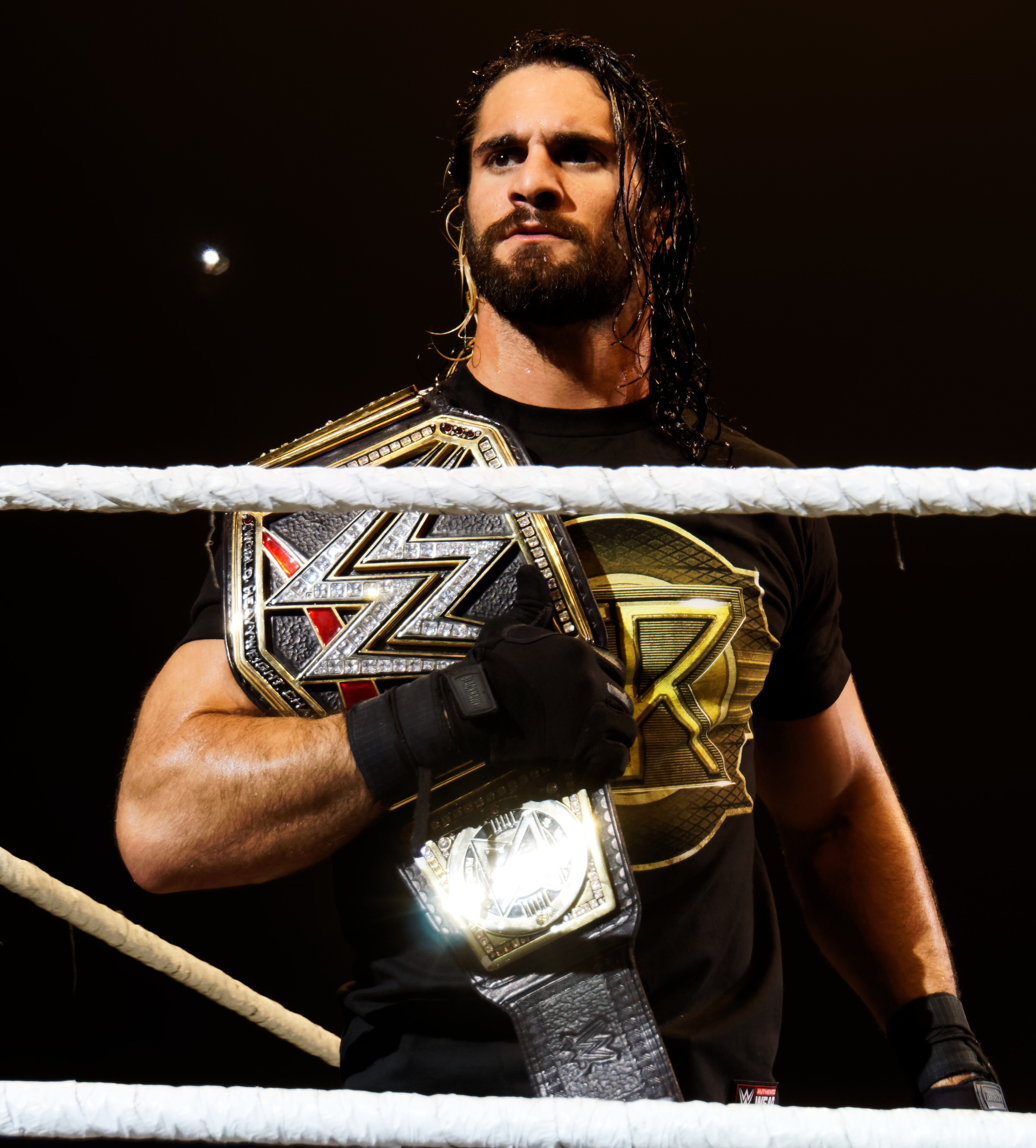
Due to a knee injury, Seth Rollins was forced to vacate the WWE World Heavyweight Championship, and a tournament was made to crown a new champion at Survivor Series.

After Seth Rollins retained the WWE World Heavyweight Championship at Hell in a Cell, a number one contender was determined the next night on Raw. Eight wrestlers that were victorious at Hell in a Cell competed in singles matches, with the winners advancing to a fatal four-way match. Roman Reigns emerged victorious and was named the number one contender. However, on November 4, Rollins suffered multiple legitimate knee injuries at a live event in Dublin, Ireland; therefore, the title was vacated and a tournament was set up to crown a new champion. The tournament began on the November 9 episode of Raw, with the semifinals and the final match scheduled for Survivor Series. Since Reigns was already the number one contender, Triple H offered him to pass directly into the finals if he would join The Authority. Reigns refused, preferring to go through the tournament. On the November 16 episode of Raw, Reigns, Dean Ambrose, Intercontinental Champion Kevin Owens, and United States Champion Alberto Del Rio advanced to the semifinals with victories over Cesaro, Dolph Ziggler, Neville, and Kalisto respectively, setting up Reigns vs. Del Rio and Ambrose vs. Owens in the semifinals at the event.

On the November 2 episode of Raw, Paige defeated Becky Lynch, Brie Bella, and Sasha Banks in a fatal four-way match to earn a Divas Championship match against Charlotte at Survivor Series.

At Hell in a Cell, The Wyatt Family (Bray Wyatt, Luke Harper, Erick Rowan, and Braun Strowman) attacked The Undertaker after he had lost to Brock Lesnar in a Hell in a Cell match and carried him out of the arena. The following night on Raw, The Undertaker's brother Kane confronted The Wyatt Family but was also overpowered and carried out. On the November 9 episode of Raw, The Undertaker and Kane returned and attacked The Wyatt Family. On the November 12 episode of SmackDown, Wyatt challenged the brothers to a tag team match at Survivor Series against two handpicked members of The Wyatt Family, which they accepted.

On the October 22 episode of SmackDown, Tyler Breeze made his WWE debut and attacked Dolph Ziggler. On the October 29 episode, after Ziggler defeated The Miz, Breeze attacked Ziggler. On the November 2 episode of Raw, Breeze distracted Ziggler during a match with Kevin Owens, allowing Owens to get the victory. On the November 19 episode of SmackDown, after Breeze defeated Zack Ryder, Ziggler attacked Breeze. Later in the show, a match between Ziggler and Breeze was scheduled for the event.

== ISIS threat ==
The Federal Bureau of Investigation investigated an alleged threat by the Islamic State of Iraq and the Levant (ISIS) at the event. On November 21, 2015, the FBI released the statement, "The FBI is aware of reports of an alleged threat that includes an Atlanta, Georgia venue and event. While we take all threats seriously, we do not have specific or credible information of an attack at this time. We have, however, made the proper notifications as we continue to work closely with our law enforcement and private sector partners to keep our community safe." International Business Times reported that the hacker group Anonymous were responsible for uncovering the information. WWE released a statement stating that the show would go on as scheduled. The show went on with no attack from ISIS.

== Event ==
Other on-screen personnel
| Role: | Name: |
|---|---|
| English commentators | Michael Cole |
| English commentators | Jerry Lawler |
| English commentators | John "Bradshaw" Layfield |
| Spanish commentators | Carlos Cabrera |
| Spanish commentators | Marcelo Rodriguez |
| Backstage interviewers | Tom Phillips (Pre-show) |
| Backstage interviewers | Rich Brennan (Pre-show) |
| Backstage interviewers | JoJo |
| Ring announcers | Lilian Garcia |
| Ring announcers | Eden Stiles |
| Referees | Mike Chioda |
| Referees | Darrick Moore |
| Referees | John Cone |
| Referees | Charles Robinson |
| Referees | Dan Engler |
| Referees | Rod Zapata |
| Referees | Jason Ayers |
| Pre-show panel | Renee Young |
| Pre-show panel | Booker T |
| Pre-show panel | Corey Graves |
| Pre-show panel | Byron Saxton |

=== Pre-show ===
During the Survivor Series Kickoff pre-show, The Dudley Boyz (Bubba Ray Dudley and D-Von Dudley), Goldust, Neville, and Titus O'Neil faced The Cosmic Wasteland (Stardust, Konnor, and Viktor), The Miz, and Bo Dallas in a Survivor Series elimination tag team match. Viktor was eliminated by Goldust after a snap scoop powerslam. Konnor was eliminated by Bubba Ray after a side slam. Neville was eliminated by The Miz after a Bo-Dog by Dallas, followed by a Skull Crushing Finale by The Miz. The Miz was eliminated by Goldust with a schoolboy pin. Dallas was eliminated by O'Neil after a Clash of the Titus. Stardust was eliminated by D-Von after a 3-D by the Dudleyz, leaving Goldust, The Dudleyz, and Titus O'Neil as the survivors.

=== Preliminary matches ===
The actual pay-per-view opened with the semifinals in the tournament for the WWE World Heavyweight Championship. In the first semifinal, Roman Reigns faced Alberto Del Rio (accompanied by Zeb Colter). In the end, as Del Rio leapt off the top rope, Reigns avoided Del Rio and executed a Spear on Del Rio to win the match and advance to the finals.

Next, Dean Ambrose and Kevin Owens competed in the second semifinal match. In the end, as Owens attempted a Pop Up Powerbomb, Ambrose countered with a Hurricanrana and executed Dirty Deeds on Owens to win the match and advance to the finals.

After that, The New Day (Big E, Kofi Kingston, and Xavier Woods), Sheamus, and King Barrett faced The Usos (Jey Uso and Jimmy Uso), The Lucha Dragons (Kalisto and Sin Cara), and Ryback in a Survivor Series Elimination Tag Team match. Barrett was eliminated by Sin Cara after a Springboard Senton Bomb. Jimmy Uso was eliminated by Xavier Woods after a Backbreaker/Diving Double Foot Stomp combination with Kingston. Sin Cara was eliminated by Sheamus after a Brogue Kick. Big E was eliminated by Jey Uso after a Samoan Splash. After Big E was eliminated, Kingston and Woods left with Big E, eliminating Kingston and Woods. In the end, Sheamus received a Superkick from Jey Uso, a Hurricanrana from Kalisto and was eliminated by Ryback after Shellshocked, leaving Ryback, Kalisto and Jey as the survivors.

In the fourth match, Charlotte defended the WWE Divas Championship against Paige. During the match, Charlotte executed a Natural Selection on Paige, causing Paige to roll outside the ring. Paige climbed onto the barricade and taunted Charlotte, who also climbed up and executed a Spear on Paige. Charlotte, with her arms under the bottom rope, forced Paige to submit to the Figure Eight Leglock to retain.

In the fifth match, Tyler Breeze faced Dolph Ziggler. Breeze executed an Unprettier on Ziggler to win the match.

In the penultimate match, The Brothers of Destruction (The Undertaker and Kane) fought Bray Wyatt and Luke Harper of The Wyatt Family, with Erick Rowan and Braun Strowman at ringside. Before the match, The Undertaker and Kane performed a Double Chokeslam on Rowan. During the match, The Undertaker and Kane performed a double Chokeslam on Strowman through a broadcast table. In the climax, Wyatt performed a Spider Walk to taunt his opponents, however, The Undertaker and Kane sat up simultaneously. The Undertaker and Kane performed a Double Chokeslam on Wyatt and Harper before The Undertaker pinned Harper after a Tombstone Piledriver to win the match.

=== Main event ===
In the main event, Roman Reigns and Dean Ambrose fought in the tournament final for the vacant WWE World Heavyweight Championship. During the match, Ambrose leapt off the top rope but was intercepted by Reigns with a Superman Punch for a near-fall. Reigns performed a Spear on Ambrose for a near-fall. When Reigns attempted another Spear, Ambrose shoved him into the ring post and rolled him up for a near-fall. Ambrose executed Dirty Deeds on Reigns for a near-fall. Reigns performed another Spear on Ambrose to win the championship.

After the match, Reigns celebrated in the ring with his newly won belt as pyrotechnics went off and confetti started falling in the arena. Triple H then came in the ring to congratulate Reigns, and offered him a handshake, but Reigns attacked him with a Spear. Sheamus then surprised Reigns with a Brogue Kick and cashed in his Money in the Bank contract. After Reigns kicked out of a pinfall attempt, Sheamus executed another Brogue Kick on Reigns to win the championship. Afterwards, Sheamus and Triple H celebrated their win, confirming that Sheamus had now joined the Authority to take Rollins’ place.

== Reception ==
The entire event and also "particularly the event's finish, was widely met with negative reviews and utter disappointment from observers", as described by Adam Silverstein of CBS Sports. This was due to "mundane matches that failed to captivate the audience" and "replicated a clunky finish from a pay-per-view just one year earlier", resulting in "a new World Heavyweight Champion in Sheamus that no one desires to see as part of the main event picture". Silverstein highlighted the negative reaction of former WWE Champion Mick Foley, who was "on the verge of becoming a former WWE fan" after seeing how "WWE has completely failed to capitalize not only on the male wrestlers drawing positive reactions from the crowd" like "Ziggler to Cesaro to Kevin Owens", but also the "female performers who are promoted well on the company's NXT developmental show but hardly given any time to 'get over'" on WWE's main roster.

Aaron Oster of Rolling Stone declared that Survivor Series was "a night that started with much promise, but ended in disappointment". While the event was not "awful" due to a "phenomenal" entrance for the Undertaker on his 25th anniversary and three "solid" matches: the tournament semi-finals and the traditional Survivor Series tag match, "the main event ... never connected and concluded in a way that cast a pall over the rest of the show – and quite possibly the company, too." This was because "Sheamus cannot be the guy at the top of your card every night ... When a bad guy's biggest heel quality is his facial hair, it doesn't bode well." Also, it was "hard to buy" Roman Reigns as "a plucky underdog being screwed over by the Authority", when leading into the event Reigns "still seemed like Vince McMahon's handpicked guy". For other topics, Oster said the "whole night was a tribute to the Undertaker", who revived the "dead" crowd. Tyler Breeze's character was enhanced by using the Unprettier move, while Dolph Ziggler, in copying Shawn Michaels' dressing and mannerisms, "just needs to figure out who he is, and quickly." Lastly, Oster questioned, "If they are going to go completely random with the Survivor Series matches, are they really worth having?"

James Cadwell of Pro Wrestling Torch rated the Del Rio-Reigns semi-final three-and-a-half stars out of five, "really good" in spite of the "outcome was never in doubt, removing some of the drama". The Ambrose-Owens semi-final was rated three-and-a-quarter stars, due to both wrestlers being "really good in the ring and they had strong chemistry building to the finish". For the women's match, Caldwell wrote that it "didn't generate enough of a reaction for a supposed grudge match", and that "it's so difficult for Charlotte’s character, like Reigns, to get sympathy in the babyface role when she towers over everyone and carries herself like she’s arrived". The Undertaker participated in a "fine nostalgic match" that would be "satisfying" for fans of his, but for others an "exhibition match victory over heels who were defined-down as henchmen". The tournament final was too short to be rated over two-and-three-quarters stars, where "WWE was just not going to waver from the plan to have Reigns win" despite Ambrose enjoying a more favorable reaction. Lastly, Caldwell wrote that "Lame Sheamus as champ" was "foreshadowed ... earlier in the show by having Sheamus act like an idiot so 'they'll never see it coming!'"

John Powell of Canadian Online Explorer wrote that Survivor Series was "one of, if not the, worst WWE pay-per-view of 2015". It "exposed all of the WWE's weaknesses" and "epitomized the existing WWE product. It is musty, tedious and worst of all, predictable." Powell singled out three main areas for criticism. Firstly, a "slipshod, bumbling interview" involving Dean Ambrose and a "rambling" Roman Reigns. Secondly, WWE keeping "fans in the dark" after "Network streaming issues". Thirdly, "questionable booking": the world champion heading out of the PPV was earlier "portrayed as an out-of-step idiot, easily pinned and losing the match for his team after being abandoned by The New Day"; "claiming to have a 'Divas Revolution' then pushing nobody but Paige, The Bellas and Charlotte"; the tournament final being a "mediocre rush job" at 9 minutes while the traditional Survivor Series match which was unhyped and had unannounced participants was given almost 20 minutes.

Will Pruett of Pro Wrestling Dot Net wrote that "WWE produced an evening filled with flaws, ranging from giant to minor" resulting in a "broken universe". "The largest logical fallacy of Survivor Series was assuming anything being done on this show was being done for any reason other than 'it'll shock everyone' or 'that's how we've always done it'." Commenting on individual wrestlers, Pruett said that Roman Reigns, the 'supposed sympathetic star', 'lost all sympathy' by attacking Triple H, who "hadn't been very evil when it came to Reigns"; "Alberto Del Rio has been noticeably disconnected in his matches since his return last month"; and Sheamus "could be a legitimate WWE Champion at some point", but "WWE seems to abuse his character." Lastly, Pruett felt that the Undertaker's entrance and match was "a life raft of heartfelt joy", "in the sea of negativity and sadness WWE lead me to" at the event.

== Aftermath ==
The post-Survivor Series Raw was the lowest rated non-holiday episode since 1997 and the first time Raw averaged less than three million viewers since then. On that episode, Roman Reigns confronted The Authority and demanded a rematch against Sheamus for the WWE World Heavyweight Championship that night. Triple H scheduled a rematch for TLC: Tables, Ladders & Chairs in a Tables, Ladders, and Chairs match before leaving Reigns to face Rusev that night, which Reigns won by disqualification after King Barrett interfered. On the November 30 episode of Raw, Reigns attacked Sheamus during his WWE World Heavyweight Championship celebrations before taking the belt with him. This prompted Sheamus to give Reigns a title match for the WWE World Heavyweight Championship that night, but with the stipulation that Reigns must beat him in 5:15 (the amount of time that Reigns' short-lived title reign lasted) in order to win the title. Reigns defeated Sheamus by disqualification after Rusev interfered, which prevented Reigns from winning the title. After the match, Sheamus was helped by Rusev, King Barrett, and Alberto Del Rio, and introduced themselves as The League of Nations.

On the November 26 episode of SmackDown, Dean Ambrose won a triple threat match against Dolph Ziggler and Tyler Breeze to become the number one contender to Kevin Owens's Intercontinental Championship.

On the November 23 episode of Raw, to celebrate one year as a tag team, The New Day (Kofi Kingston, Big E, and Xavier Woods) decided to issue an open challenge to anyone who wants to have a shot at winning their WWE Tag Team Championship, but when The Lucha Dragons (Kalisto and Sin Cara) and The Usos (Jey Uso and Jimmy Uso) got involved, they decided to cancel the challenge. On the November 30 episode of Raw, the match to determine the #1 contender between The Usos and The Lucha Dragons ended in a double disqualification after The New Day interfered. The Authority decided to make the WWE Tag Team Championship match a Triple Threat Tag Team Ladder match in which The Lucha Dragons were immediately inserted, but that The Usos would only participate if Roman Reigns defeated Sheamus that night. As Reigns won by disqualification, The Usos were inserted into the title match.

On the November 23 episode of Raw, The Wyatt Family (Bray Wyatt and Luke Harper) (with Erick Rowan and Braun Strowman) defeated The Dudley Boyz (Bubba Ray Dudley and D-Von Dudley) before repeatedly attacking them. On the November 26 episode of SmackDown, The Dudley Boyz defeated Strowman and Rowan by disqualification after Wyatt Family member Harper interfered in the match. Afterwards, The Wyatt Family put Bubba Ray through a table. On the November 30 episode of Raw, The Dudley Boyz introduced Tommy Dreamer, making his return to WWE in over 5 years, to join them in their ongoing fight against The Wyatt Family. After Rhyno made his return, an eight-man elimination tables match pitting The Dudley Boyz, Dreamer, and Rhyno against The Wyatt Family was scheduled for TLC.

After failing to defeat Charlotte for the WWE Divas Championship at the event, Paige accused her of cheating similar to that of her father Ric Flair on the November 23 episode of Raw. The two faced each other that night in a rematch for the WWE Divas Championship which ended in a double count-out after Paige failed to get back in the ring in time after preventing Charlotte from getting back in first. After the match, Paige continued to attack Charlotte which ended with Paige trapping Charlotte in the PTO on top of the broadcast table. On the November 30 episode of Raw, Charlotte defeated her friend Becky Lynch after she faked a leg injury and her father distracted Lynch to allow her to roll Lynch for the win. Their friendship was further strained on the December 3 episode of SmackDown, when Charlotte attacked Lynch's opponent Brie Bella while locked in the Dis-arm-her after Bella hit her by accident, giving Bella a disqualification win. Afterwards, another title match between Paige and Charlotte was scheduled for TLC. This was the last Survivor Series event to feature the Divas Championship as it was retired and replaced by a new WWE Women's Championship during the WrestleMania 32 pre-show in April 2016.

The 2015 Survivor Series was the last Survivor Series held before the reintroduction of the brand extension in July 2016, which again split the roster between the Raw and SmackDown brands where wrestlers were exclusively assigned to perform. Additionally, the 2016 event was the genesis of the 2017–2021 events, in which Survivor Series became themed around brand supremacy, featuring the brands competing against each other. However, the 2022 event centered on the WarGames match, dropping the brand supremacy theme, with all events since known as Survivor Series: WarGames.

== Results ==
| No. | Results | Stipulations | Times |
|---|---|---|---|
| 1^{P} | The Dudley Boyz (Bubba Ray Dudley and D-Von Dudley), Goldust, Neville, and Titus O'Neil defeated Bo Dallas, The Ascension (Konnor and Viktor), Stardust, and The Miz^{1} | 5-on-5 Survivor Series match | 18:10 |
| 2 | Roman Reigns defeated Alberto Del Rio (with Zeb Colter) by pinfall | WWE World Heavyweight Championship tournament semifinal match | 14:05 |
| 3 | Dean Ambrose defeated Kevin Owens by pinfall | WWE World Heavyweight Championship tournament semifinal match | 11:20 |
| 4 | The Usos (Jey Uso and Jimmy Uso), The Lucha Dragons (Kalisto and Sin Cara), and Ryback defeated King Barrett, Sheamus, and The New Day (Big E, Kofi Kingston, and Xavier Woods)^{2} | 5-on-5 Survivor Series match | 17:33 |
| 5 | Charlotte (c) defeated Paige by submission | Singles match for the WWE Divas Championship | 14:18 |
| 6 | Tyler Breeze (with Summer Rae) defeated Dolph Ziggler by pinfall | Singles match | 06:41 |
| 7 | The Brothers of Destruction (Kane and The Undertaker) defeated The Wyatt Family (Bray Wyatt and Luke Harper) (with Braun Strowman and Erick Rowan) by pinfall | Tag team match | 10:18 |
| 8 | Roman Reigns defeated Dean Ambrose by pinfall | Tournament final for the vacant WWE World Heavyweight Championship | 9:02 |
| 9 | Sheamus defeated Roman Reigns (c) by pinfall | Singles match for the WWE World Heavyweight Championship; This was Sheamus's Money in the Bank cash-in match. | 0:38 |
(c) / – the champion(s) heading into the match; P / – the match was broadcast on the pre-show

=== Survivor Series matches ===
^1

| Eliminated | Wrestler | Eliminated by | Method | Time |
|---|---|---|---|---|
| 1 | Viktor | Goldust | Pinfall | 0:30 |
| 2 | Konnor | Bubba Ray Dudley | Pinfall | 5:27 |
| 3 | Neville | The Miz | Pinfall | 8:40 |
| 4 | The Miz | Goldust | Pinfall | 9:05 |
| 5 | Bo Dallas | Titus O'Neil | Pinfall | 17:20 |
| 6 | Stardust | D-Von Dudley | Pinfall | 18:10 |
| Survivor(s): | Bubba Ray Dudley, D-Von Dudley, Goldust, and Titus O'Neil | | | 18:10 |

^2

| Eliminated | Wrestler | Eliminated by | Method | Time |
|---|---|---|---|---|
| 1 | King Barrett | Sin Cara | Pinfall | 7:46 |
| 2 | Jimmy Uso | Xavier Woods | Pinfall | 9:22 |
| 3 | Sin Cara | Sheamus | Pinfall | 10:42 |
| 4 | Big E | Jey Uso | Pinfall | 11:30 |
| 5 | Kofi Kingston | N/A | Countout | 11:30 |
| 5 | Xavier Woods | N/A | Countout | 11:30 |
| 7 | Sheamus | Ryback | Pinfall | 17:33 |
| Survivor(s): | Ryback, Kalisto, and Jey Uso | | | 17:33 |

=== WWE World Heavyweight Championship Tournament bracket ===
1st Round; Raw; November 9, 2015; SmackDown; November 12, 2015
Roman Reigns | Pinfall
Big Show | 11:57
Cesaro | Pinfall
Sheamus | 15:30
Alberto Del Rio | Pinfall
Stardust | 9:43
Kalisto | Pinfall
Ryback | 12:35
Titus O'Neil | 6:50
Kevin Owens | Pinfall
Neville | Pinfall
King Barrett | 15:21
Dolph Ziggler | Pinfall
The Miz | 5:01
Dean Ambrose | Pinfall
Tyler Breeze | 11:08

Quarterfinals; Raw; November 16, 2015
Roman Reigns | Pinfall
Cesaro | 20:23
Alberto Del Rio | Pinfall
Kalisto | 10:05
Kevin Owens | Pinfall
Neville | 10:45
Dolph Ziggler | 16:45
Dean Ambrose | Pinfall

Semifinals; Survivor Series; November 22, 2015
Roman Reigns | Pinfall
Alberto Del Rio | 14:05
Kevin Owens | 11:20
Dean Ambrose | Pinfall

Final; Survivor Series; November 22, 2015
Roman Reigns | Pinfall
Dean Ambrose | 9:02
