= Hell in a Cell (2015) =

WWE pay-per-view and livestreaming event

- Promotional poster featuring Brock Lesnar, The Undertaker, and the Hell in a Cell structure
- Promotion: WWE
- Date: October 25, 2015
- City: Los Angeles, California
- Venue: Staples Center
- Attendance: 17,505
- Buy rate: 87,000 (excluding WWE Network views)

WWE event chronology
← Previous; NXT TakeOver: Respect	Next → Survivor Series

Hell in a Cell chronology
← Previous; 2014	Next → 2016

The 2015 Hell in a Cell was a professional wrestling pay-per-view (PPV) and livestreaming event produced by WWE. It was the seventh annual Hell in a Cell and took place on October 25, 2015, at the Staples Center in Los Angeles, California. The event centered on the men's Hell in a Cell match, a 20-foot-high roofed steel cage that surrounds the ring and ringside area with no countouts or disqualifications and the only way to win is by pinfall or submission in the ring.

Eight matches were contested at the event, including one on the Kickoff pre-show. There were two Hell in a Cell matches, including the main event which saw Brock Lesnar defeat The Undertaker. This was their second Hell in a Cell match against each other, after No Mercy in October 2002 which Lesnar also won. In the event's other Hell in a Cell match, Roman Reigns defeated Bray Wyatt. The opening bout saw Alberto Del Rio, who last wrestled for WWE in 2014, return to answer John Cena's open challenge and defeated him to win the WWE United States Championship.

This was WWE's first PPV and livestreaming event, other than SummerSlam, to be held in the city of Los Angeles since No Way Out in February 2007. This was also the last Hell in a Cell event to be held before the reintroduction of the brand extension in July 2016. It was also the last Hell in a Cell event held before a women's version of the Hell in a Cell match was introduced the following year.

== Production ==
=== Background ===
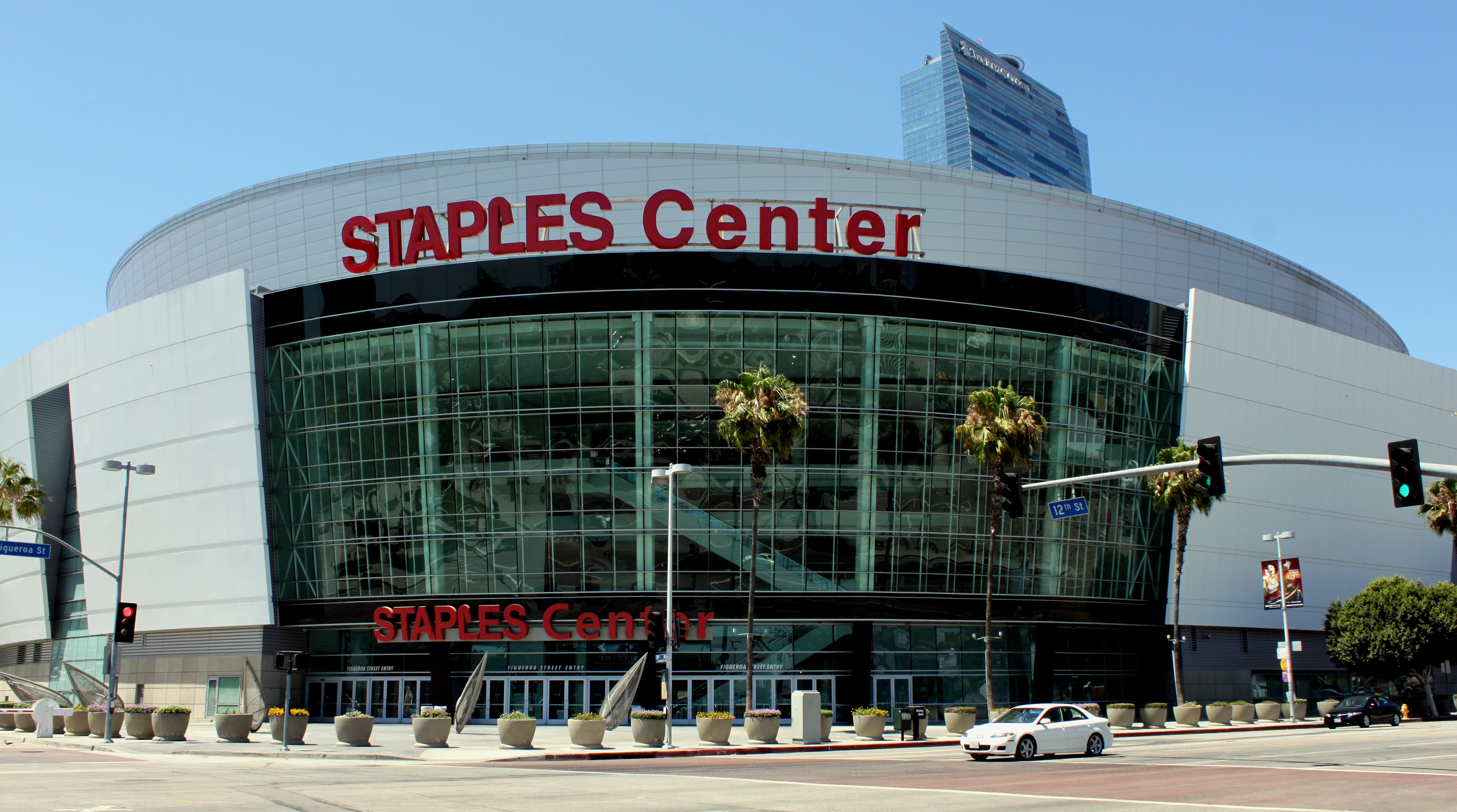
The seventh annual Hell in a Cell event was held at the Staples Center in Los Angeles, California.

Hell in a Cell was an annual professional wrestling event produced every October by WWE since 2009. It was originally broadcast exclusively via pay-per-view (PPV) before it began simultaneously livestreaming on the WWE Network in 2014. The concept of the event came from WWE's established Hell in a Cell match, in which competitors fought inside a 20-foot-high roofed cell structure surrounding the ring and ringside area. The main event match of the card was contested under the Hell in a Cell stipulation. The seventh Hell in a Cell event was scheduled to be held on October 25, 2015, at Staples Center in Los Angeles, California.

=== Storylines ===
The event comprised eight matches, including one on the Kickoff pre-show, that resulted from scripted storylines. Results were predetermined by WWE's writers, while storylines were produced on WWE's weekly television shows, Raw and SmackDown.

At WrestleMania XXX in 2014, Brock Lesnar defeated The Undertaker to end the streak. A year later at Battleground, Lesnar was about to defeat Seth Rollins for the WWE World Heavyweight Championship, when the lights went out and The Undertaker attacked Lesnar; Lesnar won the match by disqualification, but not the championship. After a vicious brawl between the two on the July 20 episode of Raw, they would face off in a rematch at SummerSlam. The Undertaker defeated Lesnar in controversial fashion; the timekeeper ringing the bell after seeing The Undertaker supposedly indicating submission; however, since the referee hadn't seen a submission and never stopped the match, the match continued. The confusion allowed The Undertaker to surprise Lesnar with a low blow before trapping him in the Hell's Gate submission hold, causing Lesnar to pass out, giving The Undertaker the win, but not before Lesnar flipped him off before going unconscious from the submission hold. At Night of Champions, Lesnar was scheduled to face The Undertaker for the final time in a Hell in a Cell match at the eponymous event. This would be their second match inside the structure against each other, as they faced off 13 years prior for the WWE Championship at No Mercy in October 2002, which Lesnar won.

At Money in the Bank, Bray Wyatt cost Roman Reigns the titular ladder match, sparking a feud between the two. This led to a match at Battleground where Wyatt defeated Reigns after interference from his former Wyatt Family member Luke Harper. The feud continued into SummerSlam where Reigns recruited former Shield partner Dean Ambrose to face Wyatt and Harper in a tag team match, which Reigns and Ambrose won. Then at Night of Champions, Wyatt, Harper, and recent new member Braun Strowman faced off against Reigns, Ambrose, and their mystery partner Chris Jericho in a six-man tag team match, which was won by The Wyatt Family. On the September 21 episode of Raw, Randy Orton helped Reigns and Ambrose fend off an attack by Wyatt, Harper, and Strowman. Subsequently, Reigns challenged Wyatt to a Hell in a Cell match at the event, which Wyatt accepted in what was to be their final encounter. A match pitting Ambrose and Orton against Harper and Strowman was also scheduled for the Hell in a Cell Kickoff pre-show, but after Orton suffered a shoulder injury, the match was cancelled.

At Night of Champions, Kane returned from injury as "Demon" Kane and attacked Seth Rollins after Rollins retained the WWE World Heavyweight Championship against Sting. At Live from Madison Square Garden, Demon Kane attacked Rollins after Rollins lost to John Cena in a steel cage match. Subsequently, Rollins was scheduled to defend his title against Demon Kane at the event, but that should Demon Kane lose, Corporate Kane, Kane's alter ego, would be fired from his role as Director of Operations.

At Night of Champions, The Dudley Boyz (Bubba Ray Dudley and D-Von Dudley) had defeated WWE Tag Team Champions The New Day (Kofi Kingston and Big E, accompanied by Xavier Woods) by disqualification, therefore not winning the titles. At Live from Madison Square Garden, The Dudley Boyz again won by disqualification. This led to another title match at Hell in a Cell.

The event also included two more rematches from Night of Champions: Charlotte defeated Nikki Bella to win the Divas Championship and Kevin Owens defeated Ryback to win the Intercontinental Championship. Both champions had to defend their newly won titles against the former champions.

An open challenge title defense by United States Champion John Cena was also scheduled for the event.

On the October 19 episode of Raw, Sheamus, King Barrett, and Rusev defeated Dolph Ziggler, Cesaro, and Neville. Later that night, a rematch between the trios was scheduled for the Hell in a Cell Kickoff pre-show.

== Event ==
Other on-screen personnel
Role:	Name:
English commentators	Michael Cole
English commentators	Jerry Lawler
English commentators	John "Bradshaw" Layfield
Spanish commentators	Carlos Cabrera
Spanish commentators	Marcelo Rodriguez
Interviewer	Rich Brennan
Ring announcer	Lilian Garcia
Referees	Charles Robinson
Referees	John Cone
Referees	Mike Chioda
Referees	Jason Ayers
Referees	Chad Patton
Referees	Ryan Tran
Referees	Dan Engler
Pre-show Panel	Renee Young
Pre-show Panel	Booker T
Pre-show Panel	Corey Graves
Pre-show Panel	Byron Saxton

=== Pre-show ===
During the Hell in a Cell Kickoff pre-show, Sheamus, King Barrett, and Rusev faced Dolph Ziggler, Cesaro, and Neville. In the end, Ziggler performed a superkick on Barrett and Cesaro performed a Cesaro Swing on Barrett. Neville executed a Red Arrow on Barrett to win the match.

=== Preliminary matches ===
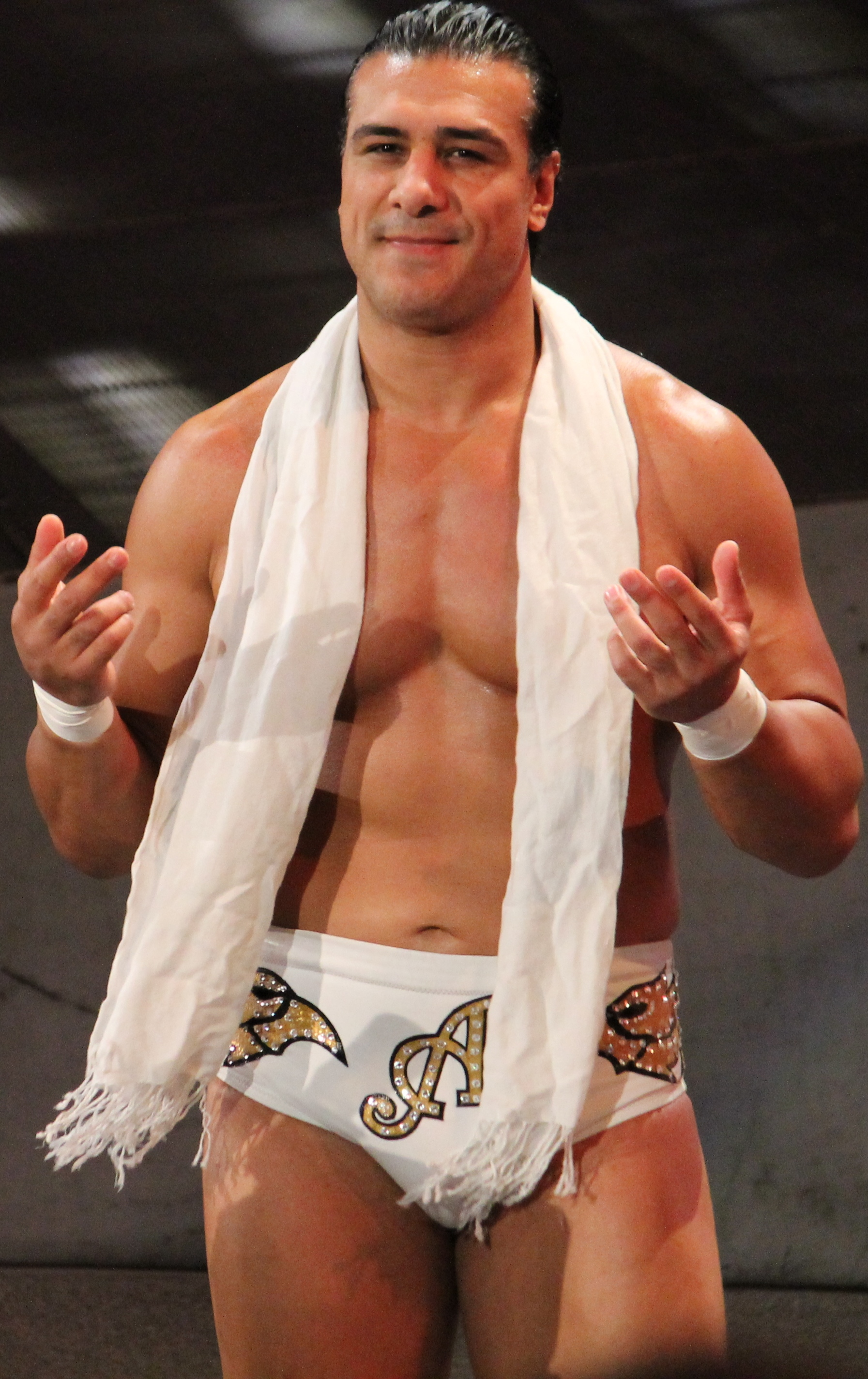
Alberto Del Rio made a surprise return to WWE at the event, answering John Cena's open challenge and defeated him for the United States Championship.

The actual pay-per-view opened with John Cena's open Challenge for the WWE United States Championship. Zeb Colter interrupted Cena's pre-match promo, introducing the returning Alberto Del Rio as Cena's opponent. The ending saw Del Rio counter an Attitude Adjustment, perform a backstabber and a superkick on a kneeling Cena, and pinned him to win the title for the first time.

Next, Roman Reigns faced Bray Wyatt in a Hell in a Cell match. During the match, Wyatt performed a side slam off the ring apron through a table on Reigns and scored a near-fall. Reigns performed a powerbomb on Wyatt through a table for a near-fall. Reigns performed a spear on Wyatt off the ring apron through a table and pinned Wyatt for a near-fall. Reigns attempted another spear only for Wyatt to counter it into a Sister Abigail on Reigns for a near-fall. In the end, Reigns threw Wyatt into a kendo stick wedged in the padding of a turnbuckle and pinned Wyatt after a spear to win the match.

After that, The New Day (Big E and Kofi Kingston) defended the WWE Tag Team Championship against The Dudley Boyz (Bubba Ray Dudley and D-Von Dudley). In the end, Big E hit Bubba Ray with Xavier Woods' trombone. Kingston pinned Bubba Ray after performing Trouble in Paradise to retain the titles.

In the fourth match, Charlotte defended the WWE Divas Championship against Nikki Bella. The match ended when Charlotte forced Nikki to submit to the Figure-Eight Leglock to retain the title.

After that, Seth Rollins defended the WWE World Heavyweight Championship against Kane. During the match, Kane performed a chokeslam on Rollins for a near-fall. Kane attempted another chokeslam through a broadcast table on Rollins, but Rollins countered with a powerbomb onto another broadcast table. In the end, Kane attempted another chokeslam, however, Rollins pinned Kane after a Pedigree to retain the title.

In the penultimate match, Kevin Owens defended the Intercontinental Championship against Ryback. The match ended when Owens pinned Ryback after a Pop-up powerbomb to retain the title.

=== Main event ===
In the main event, Brock Lesnar faced The Undertaker in a Hell in a Cell match. During the match, The Undertaker shoved Lesnar into the ring post, causing Lesnar to bleed profusely for which he needed medical intervention and eight stitches post-match. Lesnar hit The Undertaker with a steel chair, causing The Undertaker to bleed. The Undertaker drove the chair into Lesnar's throat for a near-fall. Lesnar performed two F-5s on The Undertaker for near-falls. Lesnar struck The Undertaker with the steel steps for a near-fall. The Undertaker applied the Hell's Gate on Lesnar, but Lesnar fought out of it. At the end of the match, Lesnar removed the ring cover, exposing the ring floor underneath. The Undertaker executed a chokeslam and a Tombstone Piledriver on Lesnar, both onto the exposed ring floor, for a near-fall. In the end, Lesnar attacked The Undertaker with a low blow and executed a third F-5 on The Undertaker onto the exposed ring floor to win the match.

After the match, The Wyatt Family (Bray Wyatt, Luke Harper, Erick Rowan, and Braun Strowman) attacked The Undertaker. The Undertaker fought back, but they eventually overpowered him and carried him away.

== Reception ==
The event received generally positive reviews from critics. Larry Csonka from 411Mania gave the event a 7/10. He praised Wyatt vs. Reigns and Lesnar vs. Undertaker saying that both matches delivered. The main event went on to win the Slammy Award for Match of the Year.

== Aftermath ==
The night following the event, on Raw, Bray Wyatt explained that he wanted to claim The Undertaker's soul and obtain its powers. Kane then tried to attack Wyatt but got ambushed and attacked by The Wyatt Family and was also carried out to the backstage. On the November 9 episode of Raw, The Undertaker and Kane reemerged and attacked The Wyatt Family. On the November 12 episode of SmackDown, Wyatt challenged The Undertaker and Kane to a tag team match at Survivor Series against two members of The Wyatt Family of his choosing, which they accepted later that night.

On the Raw following the event, The Authority held a tournament by pitting the winners of their respective matches at Hell in a Cell against each other to determine the next number one contender to Seth Rollins' WWE World Heavyweight Championship. Roman Reigns would win the final fatal four-way match also involving Dolph Ziggler, Kevin Owens, and Alberto Del Rio to become the number one contender and face Rollins for the championship scheduled for Survivor Series. On November 4, however, Rollins suffered multiple knee injuries during a house show in Dublin, Ireland and was forced to vacate the title. A tournament was then scheduled to determine the new champion, running through the weeks leading up to Survivor Series, with the semi-finals and finals held at Survivor Series. In the semi-finals, Reigns and Dean Ambrose advanced to the finals by defeating Del Rio and Owens, respectively.

On the October 26 episode of Raw, Paige continued to persuade Charlotte and Becky Lynch that she did not attack Natalya. While still not convinced, Charlotte and Becky allowed Paige to join them as PCB and faced Team Bella (Alicia Fox, Nikki Bella, and Brie Bella) on that night in a losing effort. After the match, Paige attacked Charlotte and Lynch, cementing her heel turn. On the November 2 episode of Raw, Paige defeated Lynch, Sasha Banks, and Brie in a fatal four-way match to determine the number one contender for the WWE Divas Championship. This was the last Hell in a Cell event to feature the Divas Championship as it was retired and replaced by a new WWE Women's Championship during the WrestleMania 32 pre-show in April 2016.

After Hell in a Cell, Jack Swagger briefly feuded with Alberto Del Rio after confronting Zeb Colter about joining Del Rio. Swagger saved Neville, who was assaulted by Del Rio after a match.

Meanwhile, John Cena took a hiatus from wrestling to film the reality series American Grit. He returned on the December 28 episode of Raw and challenged Del Rio to a title match, which Cena won by disqualification after The League of Nations (Sheamus and Rusev) interfered, but not the title.

The 2015 Hell in a Cell was the final Hell in a Cell event held before the reintroduction of the brand extension in July 2016, in which WWE again split the main roster between the Raw and SmackDown brands where wrestlers were exclusively assigned to perform. Along with this second brand split came brand-exclusive PPVs, and the 2016 event was held exclusively for the Raw brand. The 2016 event also featured the first-ever women's Hell in a Cell match.

== Results ==
No.	Results	Stipulations	Times
1^{P}	Dolph Ziggler, Cesaro, and Neville defeated Rusev, Sheamus, and King Barrett by pinfall	Six-man tag team match	11:30
2	Alberto Del Rio (with Zeb Colter) defeated John Cena (c) by pinfall	Singles match for the WWE United States Championship	7:48
3	Roman Reigns defeated Bray Wyatt by pinfall	Hell in a Cell match	23:03
4	The New Day (Big E and Kofi Kingston) (c) defeated The Dudley Boyz (Bubba Ray Dudley and D-Von Dudley) by pinfall	Tag team match for the WWE Tag Team Championship	8:24
5	Charlotte (c) defeated Nikki Bella by submission	Singles match for the WWE Divas Championship	10:39
6	Seth Rollins (c) defeated Kane by pinfall	Singles match for the WWE World Heavyweight Championship; Since "Demon" Kane lost, "Corporate" Kane was fired from his role as Director of Operations.	14:35
7	Kevin Owens (c) defeated Ryback by pinfall	Singles match for the WWE Intercontinental Championship	5:35
8	Brock Lesnar (with Paul Heyman) defeated The Undertaker by pinfall	Hell in a Cell match	18:10
(c) / – the champion(s) heading into the match; P / – the match was broadcast on the pre-show
