= SYX =

SYX may refer to:

- IATA airport code for Sanya Phoenix International Airport
- Skyway Airlines, ICAO airline code
- Syx, a professional wrestling stable consisting of Joseph Sawyer, Samuel Shaw, and Erick Redbeard
