= Alt for Norge (TV series) =

Norwegian reality television series

- Presented by: Kjetil Jansrud (2024–); Fridtjof Nilsen (2016–2019); Henriette Bruusgaard (2010–2015)
- Original languages: Norwegian (also English)
- No. of seasons: 11
- No. of episodes: 114

Production
- Production location: Norway
- Production company: Monster

Original release
- Network: TVNorge
- Release: 8 April 2010

Alt for Norge (transl. Everything for Norway, also known as The Great Norway Adventure) is a Norwegian reality television series which debuted in 2010 and appears on TVNorge. It was originally hosted by Henriette Bruusgaard from 2010 to 2015, and Fridtjof Nilsen from 2016 to 2019. It was put on hiatus from 2019 to 2024. The redebut in 2024 is hosted by Kjetil Jansrud. The reality show features Norwegian Americans participating in challenges relating to Norwegian history and culture, competing to win a reunion with their distant Norwegian relatives. The original Norwegian concept has also been exported to Sweden and Denmark.

The phrase "Alt for Norge" is the royal motto of Norway.

Significant numbers of contestants have come from Ballard, Seattle, which has a sizeable Norwegian community.

== Seasons ==
The series is in its 11th season:

- Season 1 – (2010)
- Season 2 – (2011)
- Season 3 – (2012)
- Season 4 – (2013)
- Season 5 – (2014)
- Season 6 – (2015)
- Season 7 – (2016)
- Season 8 – (2017)
- Season 9 – (2018)
- Season 10 – (2019)
- Season 11 – (2024)

The Winner of each season is highlighted in bold.

== 2010 – Season 01 ==
Contestant	From	Place of origin in Norway
Grant Aaseng	Alexandria, Minnesota	Heidal, Oppland
Clinton Admire	Fort Worth, Texas	Haugesund, Rogaland
Deborah Breberg	Dawson, Minnesota	Tuddal, Telemark
Flannery Good	Fresno, California	Våler, Hedmark
Signe Harriday	New York	Steinkjer, Nord-Trøndelag
Matthew Lovik	California	Stord, Hordaland
**Doug Miner**	Seattle	Helleland, Rogaland
Joseph Ruud	Minneapolis, Minnesota	Nannestad, Akershus
Maia Surace	Chicago, Illinois	Stord, Hordaland
Kari Tauring	Minnesota	Gudvangen, Sogn og Fjordane

== 2011 – Season 02 ==
Contestant	From	Place of origin in Norway
**Matthew Rowe**	Colorado	Balestrand, Sogn og Fjordane
Britta Nordahl	Newport Beach	Balestrand, Sogn og Fjordane
Mary Hakes	Minnesota	Tinn, Telemark
Lulie Newcomb	Los Angeles	Hamarøy, Nordland
Shanna Olson	Los Angeles	Tuddal, Telemark
Joshua J. Svare	Seattle	Nesna, Nordland
Paul Haugen	Minnesota	Ringebu, Oppland
Tom Tørresdal	Portland	Tørresdal
Justin Jørgensen	Los Angeles	Sandnes, Rogaland
Saskia Larsen	Connecticut	Sandefjord, Vestfold
Kimmy Nolan	New York	Ringerike, Buskerud
Dakota Gillespie	North Dakota	Stryn, Sogn og Fjordane

== 2012 – Season 03 ==
Contestant	From	Place of origin in Norway
**Todd Ferris**	Zionsville, Indiana	Selbu, Sør-Trøndelag
Alf Herigstad	East Olympia, Washington	Time, Rogaland
Austin Muller	Wisconsin	Luster, Sogn og Fjordane
Tara Filer (Yant)	Oregon	Trøgstad, Østfold
Dana Dinsmore	Hawaii	Ålesund, Møre og Romsdal
Barbara Liles	Portland	Namdalseid, Nord-Trøndelag
Jessica Brustad	San Diego	Tufsingdal, Hedmark
Johnathan Richards	Houston	Trondheim, Sør-Trøndelag
C.J. Foss	Pittsburgh	Oslo
Amy Hesteness	Minnesota	Hestenesøyra, Sogn og Fjordane
Stephanie Reese	Los Angeles	Tingvoll, Møre og Romsdal
Mary Caryl Giltner Serritella	Los Angeles	Skafså, Telemark

== 2013 – Season 04 ==
Contestant	From	Place of origin in Norway
Angela Flatland	Wisconsin	Hjartdal, Telemark
Andy Rae Halverson	St. Paul	Hurdal, Akershus
Travis Nordgård	South Dakota	Sparbu, Nord-Trøndelag
**Berit Jansen Rodsater**	Los Angeles	Fjærland, Sogn og Fjordane
Jorgen Karlsrud	Minneapolis	Hadeland, Oppland
Karac Ellestad	Harrisburg	Vestre Slidre, Oppland
Greg Larsen	Nashville	Rennesøy, Rogaland
Colby Bakke Kristoffer	Los Angeles	Toten, Oppland
Lïv Bly	Minnesota	Narvik, Nordland
Raquel Tait	Las Vegas	Ålesund, Møre og Romsdal
Jeri Stewart	Washington	Bergen, Hordaland
Eric Hovland	Florida	Høyanger, Sogn og Fjordane

== 2014 – Season 05 ==
Contestant	From	Place of origin in Norway
David Knudson	Minneapolis, Minnesota	Bergen, Hordaland
Guy Seese	Seattle, Washington / Anchorage, Alaska	Lurøy, Nordland
**Beth Butala**	Bloomington, Minnesota	Sogndal, Sogn og Fjordane
Breyanne Nordtvedt	Seattle, Washington / Los Angeles, California	Fusa, Hordaland
Leah Perzichilli	St. Paul, Minnesota	Nes, Hedmark
Marshell Moy	Montana / Idaho / Antarctic	Grimstad, Aust-Agder
Candice Peters	Chicago, Illinois	Tinn, Telemark
Ruth Hetland	Clifton, Texas	Dalane, Rogaland
Kent Luetzen	Grand Forks, North Dakota	Krødsherad, Buskerud
Norris Nelson Comer	St. Petersburg, Florida	Austevoll, Hordaland
Kyle deMontmorency	Utah	Åsnes, Hedmark
Brandon Brones	Chicago, Illinois	Modum, Buskerud

== 2015 – Season 06 ==
Contestant	From	Place of origin in Norway
Kelsey Tungseth	Colorado	Averøy, Møre og Romsdal
Tess Roholt	Auburn	Bamble, Telemark
Quanzakari DeChiara-Crillion	Minneapolis	Skien, Telemark
Sarah Jensen-Giampapa	Los Angeles	Oslo
Adam Tock	Champaign / Chicago, Illinois	Lier, Buskerud
**David Engen**	Minneapolis	Gausdal, Oppland
Hannah Tjoflat	Wisconsin	Ullensvang, Hordaland
Taylor Randle	Minneapolis	Tingvoll, Møre og Romsdal
Camille Humpherys	Utah	Stjørdal, Nord-Trøndelag
Scott Wallingford	Seattle	Kongsberg, Buskerud
Joel Hilmo	Seattle	Nesna, Nordland
Jake Uggerud	Alexandria	Åsnes, Hedmark

== 2016 – Season 07 ==
Contestant	From	Place of origin in Norway
Heidi Somes	Seattle, Washington	Stord, Hordaland
**Johnny Bartz**	Miami / Minnesota	Rennebu, Sør-Trøndelag
Kate Mills	Bellingham	Rissa, Sør-Trøndelag
Jeff Johnson	Minneapolis	Østre Toten, Oppland
Derrick Tingvold	Bemidji, Minnesota	Søndre Land, Oppland
Brittany (Miller) Ramsland	Minneapolis	Nes, Hallingdal, Buskerud
Lauren Semingson	Strum, Wisconsin	Tinn, Telemark
Lars Phillips	Ballard, Seattle, Washington	Tvedestrand, Aust-Agder
Kelsey Iverson	Montana	Sel, Oppland
Joni Adahl	Devils Lake, North Dakota	Kviteseid, Telemark
Thomas Monson	Minnesota / Redding, California	Jølster, Sogn og Fjordane
Richard Brunmond	White Bear Lake / Minnesota	Årdal, Sogn og Fjordane

== 2017 – Season 08 ==
Contestant	From	Place of origin in Norway
Alex Arnott	Minneapolis, MN	Hole, Buskerud
Kellie Williams	Houston, TX	Nes, Hedmark
Brennan Finn	Minnesota	Manger, Hordaland
Richie Nils Alfson	Brooklyn, NY	Skien, Telemark
Sara Heidrich	North Dakota	Valdres, Oppland
Jared Vorvick	Portland, OR	Suldal, Rogaland
Madrona Teresa DeLong	Tenino, WA	Tvedestrand, Aust-Agder
**Odessa Stevens**	Seattle, WA	Fræna, Møre og Romsdal
Christine Campisi	Long Island, NY	Lista, Vest-Agder
Jamie Larson	Monroe, Wisconsin	Luster, Sogn og Fjordane
Cash Court	Olympia, Washington	Tromsø, Troms and Røros, Sør-Trøndelag
Andrea Bennet Xiong	St. Paul, MN	Vik, Sogn og Fjordane

== 2018 – Season 09 ==
Contestant	From	Place of origin in Norway
**Kelsey Jaffer**	Geneva, IL	Lærdal, Sogn og Fjordane
Dana Louise	Shoreview, MN	Andøy, Nordland
Kirstin Franklin	Chicago, IL	Eggedal, Buskerud
Matthew Widen	Two Harbors, MN	Vanylven, Møre og Romsdal
Isaac Teaford	Salt Lake City	Fusa, Hordaland
Ashley Olson	Minneapolis, MN	Verdal, Nord-Trøndelag
Cheyenne Stevens	Bozeman, MT	Bergen, Hordaland
Chase Monger	Eden Prairie, MN	Manger, Hordaland
Julie Cascioppo	Seattle, WA	Møre og Romsdal
Mike Siebenaler	Minneapolis, MN	Aure, Møre og Romsdal
Evan Fowler	San Francisco, CA	Vefsn, Nordland
Marc Felion	Chicago, IL	Hamar, Hedmark

== 2019 – Season 10 ==
Contestant	From	Place of origin in Norway
Nicholas Beach	Snohomish, WA	Nes, Akershus
**Emma Boyum**	Minneapolis, MN	Olden
Danielle Crook	Hollywood, CA	Dovre
Mark Dahl	Tacoma, WA	Ulvik
Tamara Darress	Vero Beach, FL	Lyngør
Dylan Eike	Woodbury, MN	Haugesund
Linnea Quarberg	Saint Paul, MN	Fitjar
Nick Solchany	Lake Stevens, WA	Tomrefjord
John Soloman	San Diego, CA	Åseral
Jennifer Swenson	Oak Harbor, WA	Fresvik

== 2024 – Season 11 ==
On the 8th of November, 2019, it was announced that there were no plans for an 11th season of Alt for Norge, and for several years it appeared that season 10 would be the last season ever. However, on December 21, 2023 the search for potential season 11 contestants was announced by O’Connor Casting. Season 11 will start airing on 16 September 2024

Starting in Season 11 Kjetil Jansrud took over as host.

Contestant	From	Place of origin in Norway
Brady Arneson	Honolulu, HI	Salangen
Caroline Dahl	Texas	Rekkedal
Paige Dahlen	Los Angeles, CA	Dalen
Mark Davis	North Bend, WA	Sørøya
Doug Forest	Round Top, TX	Vardal
Trygve Gundersen	Madison, WI	Flisa
Amalia Larsen	Seattle, WA	Haugesund
Mia King Mlekarov	Seattle, WA	Vik I Sogn
Kiehl Sundt	Sequim, WA	Glomfjord
**Joel Torgeson**	San Diego, CA	Risør
