= The Wyatt Family =

Professional wrestling stable

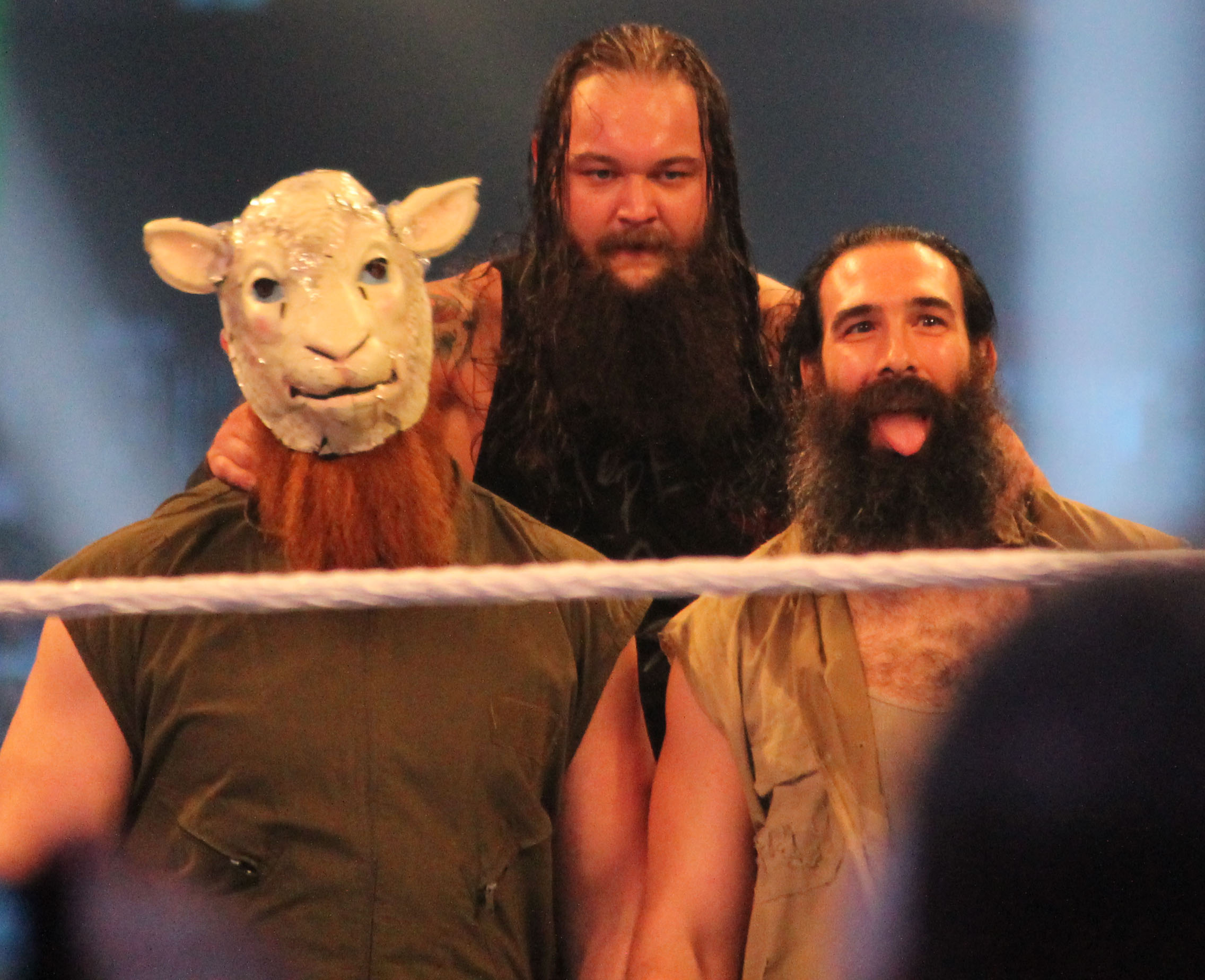
- The original Wyatt Family in April 2014; from left to right: Erick Rowan, Bray Wyatt, and Luke Harper

Stable
- Leader: Bray Wyatt
- Members: Luke Harper; Erick Rowan; Braun Strowman; Daniel Bryan; Randy Orton
- Debut: November 7, 2012
- Disbanded: May 9, 2017
- Years active: 2012–2014; 2015–2017

The Wyatt Family was an American professional wrestling stable in WWE originally composed of Bray Wyatt, Erick Rowan, and Luke Harper.

Portrayed as a villainous cult from the bayous of the Deep South, the Wyatt Family debuted in WWE's then-developmental branch NXT in November 2012, with Harper and Rowan going on to win the NXT Tag Team Championship. They debuted on the main roster in July 2013 and terrorized wrestlers such as Kane, CM Punk, Daniel Bryan, John Cena, and The Shield, among others.

Bryan joined the group in late 2013 and left in early 2014, after which Wyatt defeated him to end their feud. The original incarnation of the group began to go their separate ways in September 2014, after Wyatt announced he was "setting Harper and Rowan free". Rowan would turn into a heroic character by joining Cena's team at Survivor Series, while Harper would remain villainous and side with The Authority against Cena's team. Following a brief feud with each other, Harper and Rowan reunited in May 2015.

In July 2015, the Wyatt Family reunited and were joined by Braun Strowman, who was later taken out of the faction as a result of the 2016 WWE draft. In late 2016, with the addition of Randy Orton, the Wyatt Family won the SmackDown Tag Team Championship, holding it under the Freebird Rule. After they lost the championship, Harper left the group in January 2017. Orton won the 2017 Royal Rumble match and Wyatt won his first WWE Championship the following month, with the pair facing each other at WrestleMania 33. Wyatt and Rowan continued their alliance as the last remaining members of the Wyatt Family until the 2017 WWE Superstar Shake-up, in which Wyatt was moved to Raw while Rowan remained on SmackDown, thus disbanding the Wyatt Family.

Bryan joined AEW in 2021. Harper, who joined AEW in 2020, died from idiopathic pulmonary fibrosis at the age of 41 in December 2020; Wyatt died from a heart attack at the age of 36 in August 2023, leaving Rowan as the last surviving original member of the stable. Rowan joined The Wyatt Sicks, a heroic group led by Wyatt's real-life brother Bo Dallas and his alter ego Uncle Howdy, in mid-2024.

== Concept ==
Wyatt was portrayed as an evil cult leader who believed himself to be more monster than human, with his character drawing comparisons to Charles Manson and fellow wrestler Waylon Mercy, as well as Max Cady from the 1991 remake of Cape Fear. The group was presented as a villainous cult from the bayous of the Deep South. During the early process of creation, Judas Devlin and Baron Corbin were considered as potential members of the stable.

== History ==
=== Formation and beginnings (2012–2013) ===
The character of Bray Wyatt debuted in Florida Championship Wrestling (FCW) in April 2012 and initially associated himself with Eli Cottonwood. Cottonwood was released by WWE that June. When WWE re-branded their developmental territory into NXT, Wyatt debuted on the July 11 episode of the newly NXT television show, defeating Aiden English in a singles match.

In July, Wyatt suffered a torn pectoral muscle and required surgery. Despite the injury, Wyatt continued to appear on NXT by founding a faction known as the Wyatt Family in November, with Luke Harper and Erick Rowan as his "sons". Harper and Rowan entered the NXT Tag Team Championship tournament to crown the inaugural champions and they defeated Percy Watson and Yoshi Tatsu in the first round on the January 23, 2013, episode of NXT. Following a win over Bo Dallas and Michael McGillicutty in the semi-finals with Wyatt's interference, Luke Harper and Erick Rowan were defeated in the finals of the tournament by Adrian Neville and Oliver Grey.

Wyatt had his first match back from injury on the February 20 episode of NXT, defeating Yoshi Tatsu. The Wyatt Family later assaulted Grey (who had suffered a legitimate injury) while Wyatt prevented Dallas from winning a NXT Championship number one contender match due to Dallas' refusal to join the Wyatt Family. Dallas went on to hand Wyatt his first loss on the March 13 episode of NXT. On the May 2 episode of NXT, while Wyatt was defeated by six-time world champion Chris Jericho, Luke Harper and Erick Rowan won a triple threat elimination tag team match by last pinning Neville to earn a shot at the championship. On the May 8 episode of NXT (which was taped on May 2), Harper and Rowan defeated Neville and Bo Dallas (filling in for the injured Grey) to win the NXT Tag Team Championship.

The Wyatt Family went on to feud with Corey Graves and Kassius Ohno, with Wyatt defeating Graves on the May 22 episode of NXT, and the next week Wyatt eliminated both Graves and Ohno during an 18-man battle royal to determine the number one contender to the NXT Championship, although he was later eliminated by Adrian Neville. On the June 19 episode of NXT, the Wyatt Family defeated the team of Graves, Neville and Ohno. On the following episode of NXT, the Wyatt Family, together with Garrett Dylan and Scott Dawson, attacked Graves, Neville and Ohno; when William Regal tried to make the save, he was also overwhelmed, and this led to the Wyatt Family facing Graves, Neville and Regal in a six-man tag team match the next week on NXT, where Wyatt pinned Regal for the win. On the July 17 episode of NXT (which was taped on June 20), Harper and Rowan lost the NXT Tag Team Championship to Neville and Graves.

=== Various feuds and championship pursuits (2013–2014) ===
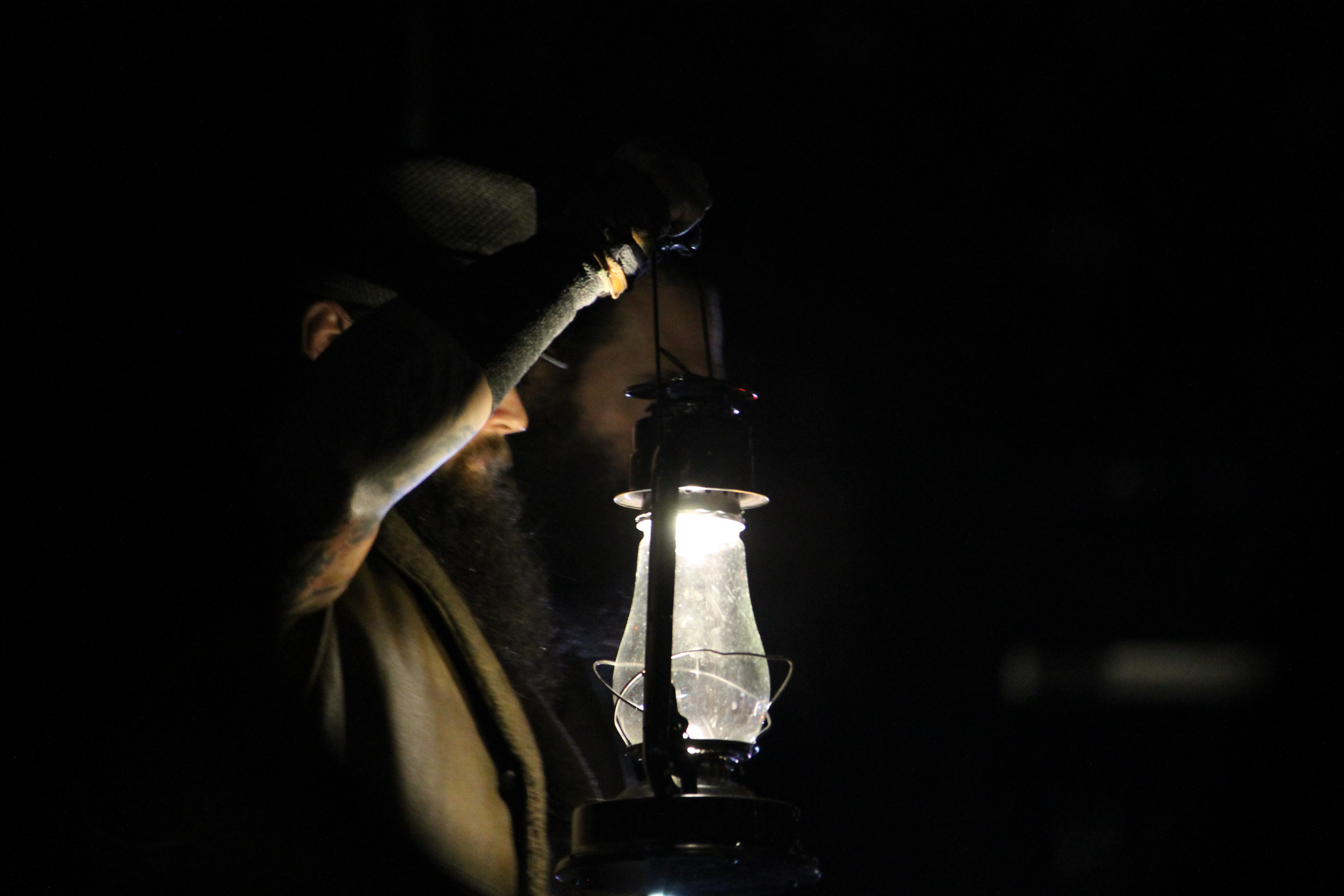
The group's signature entrance

From the May 27 episode of Raw, WWE aired vignettes promoting the upcoming debut of the Wyatt Family. The vignettes showed the Wyatt Family's backwoods origins and Rowan wearing a sheep mask. On the July 8 episode of Raw, the Wyatt Family made their debut by assaulting Kane. The Wyatt Family continued their attacks on wrestlers like R-Truth, Justin Gabriel and 3MB (Drew McIntyre, Heath Slater and Jinder Mahal), while sending cryptic messages to Kane telling him to "follow the buzzards". Following another assault, Kane challenged Wyatt to a Ring of Fire match at SummerSlam, which he accepted. On August 18 at SummerSlam, Wyatt defeated Kane following interference from Harper and Rowan, after which Harper and Rowan attacked Kane again and ended the segment by carrying him away. At Battleground on October 6, Wyatt's momentum continued with a win over Kofi Kingston. Over the next few months, Rowan and Harper competed as a tag team and went on a winning streak over many teams until the October 11 episode of SmackDown, when Harper and Rowan suffered their first loss against Cody Rhodes and Goldust.

The Wyatt Family's next feud began when they attacked CM Punk and Daniel Bryan, in late October. The feud saw Harper lose his first singles match to Punk. At Survivor Series on November 24, Harper and Rowan lost a tag team match against Bryan and Punk. The Wyatt Family then defeated Bryan in a 3-on-1 handicap match at TLC: Tables, Ladders & Chairs on December 15, with Wyatt attempting to recruit Bryan in the previous weeks. On the final Raw of 2013, Bryan defeated Harper and then Rowan in a gauntlet match that would lead to Bryan facing Wyatt, whereupon Harper and Rowan interfered to cause a disqualification and began beating Bryan down until a frustrated Bryan finally gave up and joined the Wyatt Family. However, two weeks later, Bryan attacked the other members of the Wyatt Family and broke free of the group. At the Royal Rumble on January 26, Wyatt defeated Bryan to end their feud while both Harper and Rowan entered the Royal Rumble match.

On the January 27 episode of Raw, the Wyatt Family attacked John Cena, Bryan, and Sheamus during an Elimination Chamber qualifying match against The Shield, thus awarding Cena's team win by disqualification victory over The Shield and the Elimination Chamber match slots. The Shield were seeking revenge, so a six-man tag match was set up between the Shield and the Wyatt Family at the Elimination Chamber event, which the Wyatt Family won after Dean Ambrose had disappeared into the live audience during the match. On the March 3 episode of Raw, the Shield were given a rematch against the Wyatt Family, but lost again when The Shield's poor teamwork led to Seth Rollins, leaving the ring during the match. On the April 8 episode of Main Event, the Wyatt Family was defeated by The Shield in another six-man tag team match to end the feud.

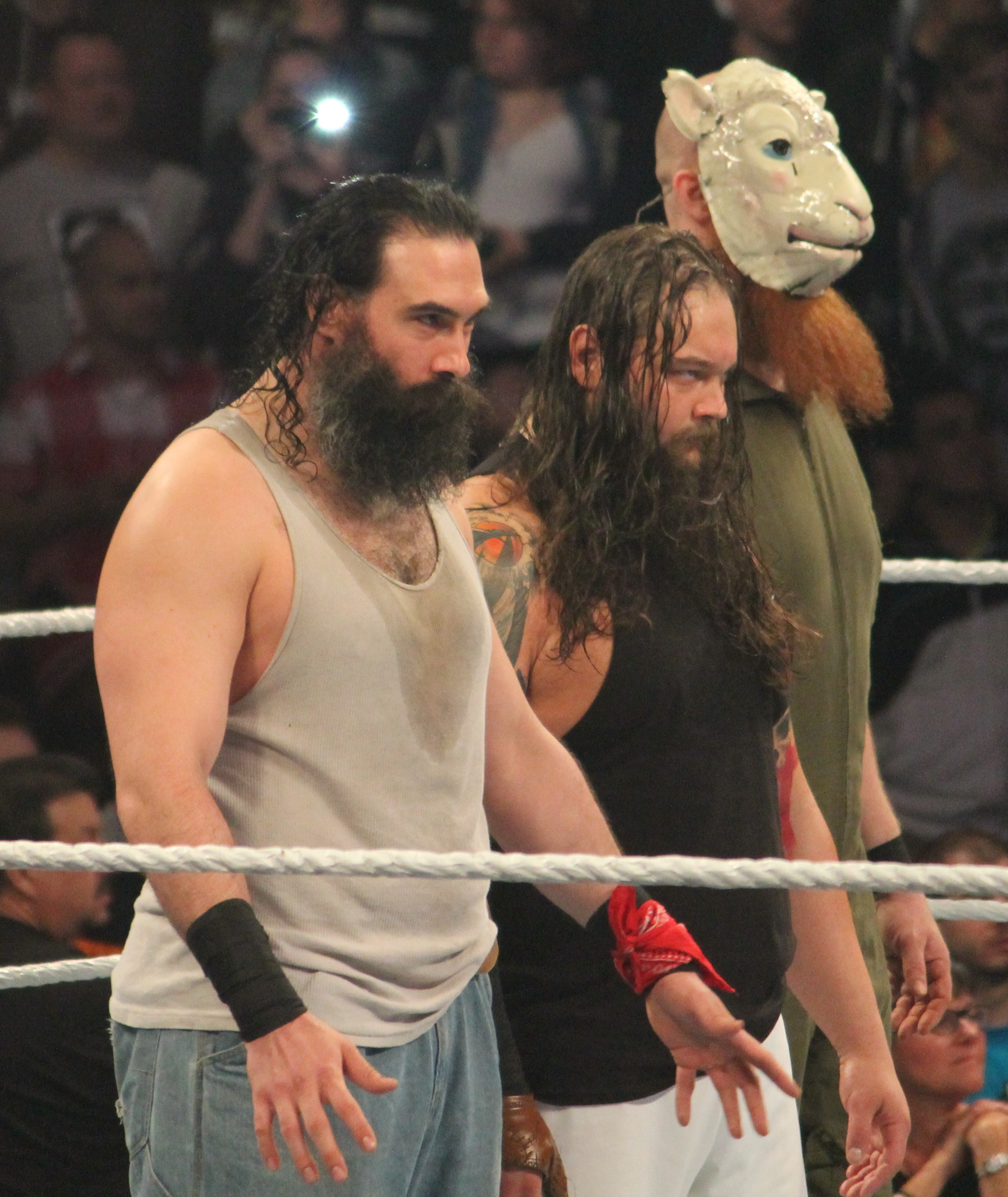
Wyatt alongside Harper and Rowan in April 2014

Between January and February, the Wyatt Family also cost John Cena his WWE World Heavyweight Championship matches against Randy Orton. At Elimination Chamber on February 23, the Wyatt Family's interference caused Cena to be eliminated from the Elimination Chamber match. After Elimination Chamber, Wyatt turned his attention fully to feud with Cena, with Wyatt wanting to prove that Cena's heroic act was a facade characteristic of "this era of lies", while also trying to turn Cena into a "monster". Wyatt went on to accept Cena's challenge for a WrestleMania match, with Cena successfully resisting the urge to become a "monster" and overcoming interference from Harper and Rowan to defeat Wyatt at WrestleMania XXX on April 6, thus marking Wyatt's first pinfall loss on WWE's main roster. The feud continued after WrestleMania XXX based on the story that Wyatt was capturing Cena's fanbase, which was exemplified by Wyatt leading a children's choir to the ring on the April 28 episode of Raw, with the children later putting on sheep masks. At Extreme Rules on May 4, Wyatt defeated Cena in a steel cage match after repeated interference from the rest of the Wyatt Family, as well as a child who had distracted Cena. Cena's feud with Wyatt continued with a Last Man Standing match being set up for Payback on June 1, which Cena won to end their feud.

On the June 2 episode of Raw, Harper and Rowan took on then WWE Tag Team Champions The Usos in a tag team match; Wyatt did not appear during the match, but his rocking chair still sat beside the ring, and Harper and Rowan went on to win the match, which made them number one contenders for the WWE Tag Team Championship. On the June 13 episode of SmackDown, due to a distraction by Seth Rollins, Wyatt went on to win his match against Dean Ambrose to qualify for the first Money in the Bank ladder match contested for the vacant WWE World Heavyweight Championship. At the 2014 Money in the Bank event on June 29, all three members of the Wyatt Family failed to win championships in their respective matches. The Wyatt Family also lost at Battleground on July 20, as The Usos successfully defended their WWE Tag Team Championship against Harper and Rowan. On the June 30 episode of Raw, the Wyatt Family interrupted Chris Jericho's return and began to beat him down. This led to a singles match between Wyatt and Jericho at Battleground which Wyatt lost. However, Wyatt defeated Jericho at SummerSlam on August 17, despite Harper and Rowan being banned from ringside. The feud with Jericho ended on the September 8 episode of Raw, when Wyatt won a steel cage match by escaping the cage.

=== Harper and Rowan's liberation (2014–2015) ===
On September 29, vignettes began to air of Wyatt announcing he was setting Harper and Rowan "free". All three members of the Wyatt Family returned to television on their own and apart from each other: Wyatt returned at Hell in a Cell on October 26, attacking Dean Ambrose; Rowan returned on the October 31 episode of SmackDown; and Harper returned on the November 10 episode of Raw, aligning himself with The Authority. On the November 17 episode of Raw, Rowan joined Team Cena for Survivor Series, thus opposing Harper's team.

The next few weeks saw Ambrose and Wyatt taunting and attacking each other in both backstage and in-ring segments, with Wyatt claiming that he could "fix" Ambrose, the way he "fixed" Harper and Rowan, leading to a match at Survivor Series, where Wyatt won the match by disqualification after Ambrose hit him with a chair, before burying him under a table, a ladder and steel chairs. At Survivor Series on November 23, Harper was one of the last men eliminated in Team Authority's loss against Rowan and Team Cena. As punishment for his affiliation with The Authority, Harper was forced to put his Intercontinental Championship on the line against Ambrose the following night on Raw and successfully retained the title after getting himself disqualified, after which Wyatt ambushed Ambrose, who was looking for weapons to attack Harper with.

On the December 8 episode of Raw, Harper and Rowan faced each other in singles competition, with Harper ultimately getting himself disqualified. On the January 5, 2015, episode of Raw, The Authority punished Rowan by putting him in a singles match against Harper, with Harper picking up the win after a discus clothesline and the help of J&J Security (Jamie Noble and Joey Mercury), who were the special guest referees for the match. On the January 22 episode of SmackDown, Harper and Rowan once again competed against each other, this time in a 2015 Royal Rumble qualifying match, with Harper winning and thus not allowing Rowan to participate in the Royal Rumble match. Despite this, Rowan appeared during the Royal Rumble match on January 25, ambushing the number six entrant Curtis Axel, to attack Harper and subsequently sparking a brief Wyatt Family reunion, along with Bray Wyatt, before all three men began to brawl.

On the May 7 episode of SmackDown, Rowan would come out after Harper defeated Fandango, seemingly to confront Harper, but would instead attack Fandango and thus turning into a villain in the process. On the May 11 episode of Raw, Harper and Rowan would officially reunite when Harper accompanied Rowan to his match against Fandango which Rowan won after 30 seconds and the two proceeded to double team Fandango after the match. On the May 18 episode of Raw, Harper and Rowan teamed up to take on Fandango and Zack Ryder, which Rowan and Harper won after a superkick and full nelson slam combination. On the May 21 episode of Main Event, Harper and Rowan defeated Fandango and Ryder in a rematch. On the June 4 episode of SmackDown, Harper and Rowan cut a promo about being ostracized and stated they were a family.

On the June 5 episode of Superstars, Harper and Rowan defeated Los Matadores in a tag team match. On the June 8 episode of Raw, Harper and Rowan defeated Los Matadores in a rematch. On the June 19 episode of Superstars, Harper and Rowan defeated Los Matadores and The Ascension in a triple threat tag team match. During a match at a live event, Rowan got injured, with reports saying he would be out of action for 4–6 months. On the June 23 episode of Main Event, Harper returned to singles competition when he defeated Cesaro, but not before cutting a promo where he said losing his tag team partner has only made him more dangerous.

=== Resurgence of the Family (2015–2016) ===
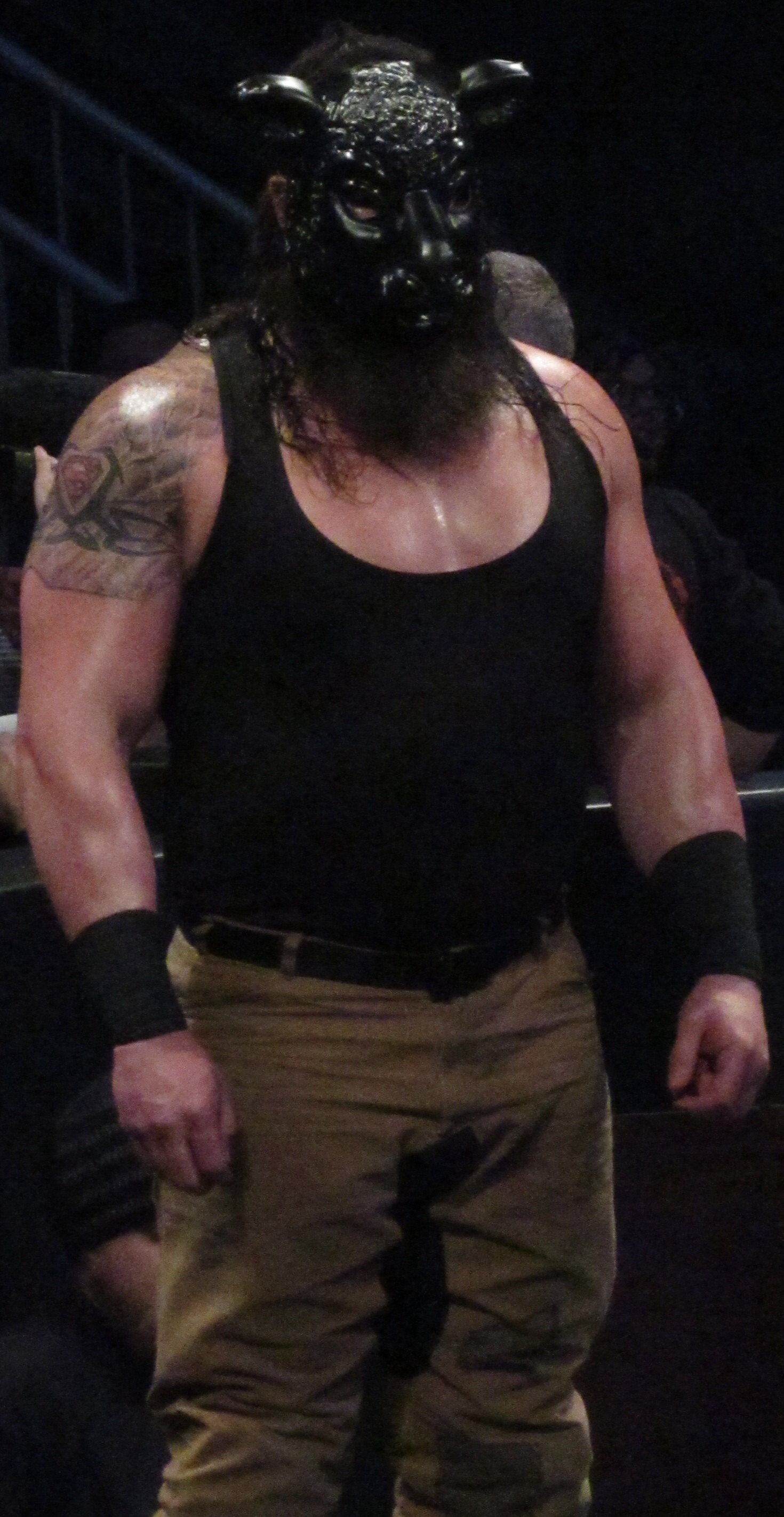
Braun Strowman was a member of the Wyatt Family from August 2015 to July 2016.

At Battleground on July 19, Harper interfered during Wyatt's match against Roman Reigns, helping him defeat Reigns and signaling the return of the stable. During a post-Battleground interview, Wyatt stated: "To the world, say your prayers, lock your doors, the family has returned". This led to a tag team match between Wyatt and Harper against Reigns and Ambrose at SummerSlam on August 23, which the Wyatt Family lost after Reigns pinned Wyatt. The following night on Raw, Wyatt and Harper fought Reigns and Ambrose in a SummerSlam rematch during which Braun Strowman made his WWE debut, joining the Wyatt Family and helping Harper and Wyatt attack Reigns and Ambrose. This led to a six-man tag team match at Night of Champions on September 20 between the Wyatts and Reigns, Ambrose and a partner of their choosing, revealed to be Chris Jericho, which the Wyatt Family won. Rowan made his return to the ring on the October 19 episode of Raw, when he filled in for Harper (who was unable to show for personal reasons), against Reigns, Ambrose and Rollins which his team won after Rollins faked an injury and walked out on the match. Wyatt's feud with Reigns culminated in a Hell in a Cell match which Wyatt lost.

"[...] when we set out and finally got the call up [from NXT to the main roster]... We were so different that I don't think the company knew even how to use us... we were so different in the promos, so different in the way we looked and how we moved... And they still don't know how to use what we are".

— Windham Rotunda (Bray Wyatt) speaking on a podcast before WrestleMania 32 on WWE's storylines for the Wyatt Family

Also at Hell in a Cell on October 25, the Wyatt Family would later attack The Undertaker and carry him backstage, reigniting their feud. The next night on Raw, Wyatt was confronted by former rival Kane, who was attacked by the Wyatts and also carried backstage. On the November 9 episode of Raw, after Bray Wyatt claimed to "have taken their souls", The Brothers of Destruction returned and attacked the Wyatt Family. At Survivor Series on November 22, Wyatt and Harper lost to The Brothers of Destruction in a tag team match after The Undertaker pinned Harper. At TLC: Tables, Ladders & Chairs on December 13, the Wyatt Family defeated Team ECW in an eight-man tag team elimination tables match.

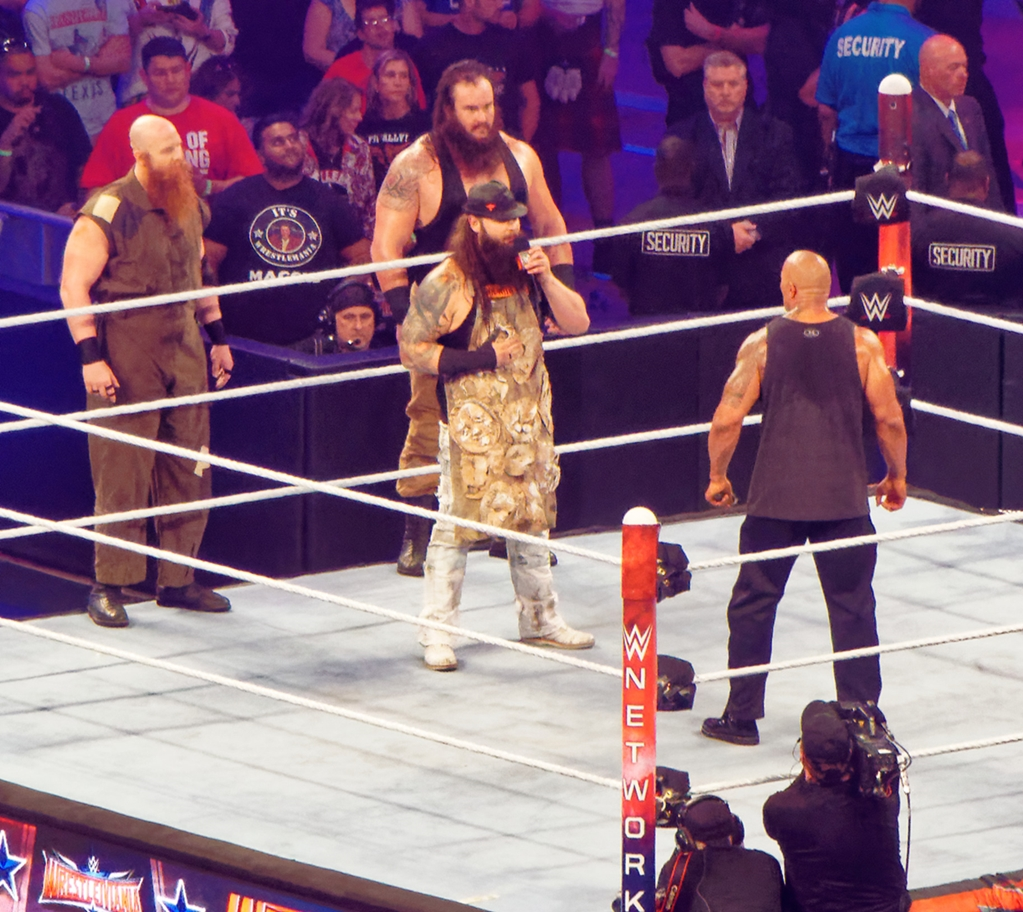
The Wyatt Family confronts The Rock at WrestleMania 32.

All four members of the Wyatt Family entered the 2016 Royal Rumble match on January 24 which was the WWE World Heavyweight Championship on the line and the group cumulatively eliminated seven wrestlers, including Brock Lesnar. Wyatt was scheduled to face Lesnar at Roadblock on March 12, but Wyatt revealed that he would be facing Lesnar alongside Harper in a two-on-one handicap match, which they lost with Wyatt never returning to the ring. It was reported that Wyatt was likely replaced in the match due to a serious back injury that he was legitimately suffering from. On March 21, Harper suffered a knee injury during a Raw dark match and it was reported that the injury would sideline him for five to six months. After getting an MRI, it was revealed that he had dislocated his patella and tore his medial patellofemoral ligament. The Wyatt Family appeared at WrestleMania 32 on April 3, where they confronted The Rock, who defeated Rowan in an impromptu match in 6 seconds and the Wyatts were then fended off by the returning John Cena and The Rock.

On the April 4 episode of Raw, the Wyatt Family started a brief feud with The League of Nations by attacking the villainous faction. On the April 11 episode of Raw, the Wyatt Family confronted and scared off the League of Nations when they were about to attack Roman Reigns, with whom Wyatt tagged with to defeat League of Nations members Sheamus and Alberto Del Rio. On April 13 during a singles match against Reigns at a live event in Italy, Wyatt suffered an injury to his right calf and was thus pulled off WWE's European tour. His injury resulted in the abrupt suspension of the feud and the breakup of The League of Nations. Although all four members appeared on the Payback poster, none of the members had a match at the event.

On the June 20 episode of Raw, the Wyatt Family (without Harper) returned for the first time since April and were confronted by then WWE Tag Team Champions The New Day, thus starting a feud between the two teams. On the July 11 episode of Raw, The New Day went to the Wyatt Family's compound where the two factions brawled. This would lead to a non-title six-man tag team match at Battleground on July 24, which the Wyatt Family would win.

=== Reunion and final separation (2016–2017) ===
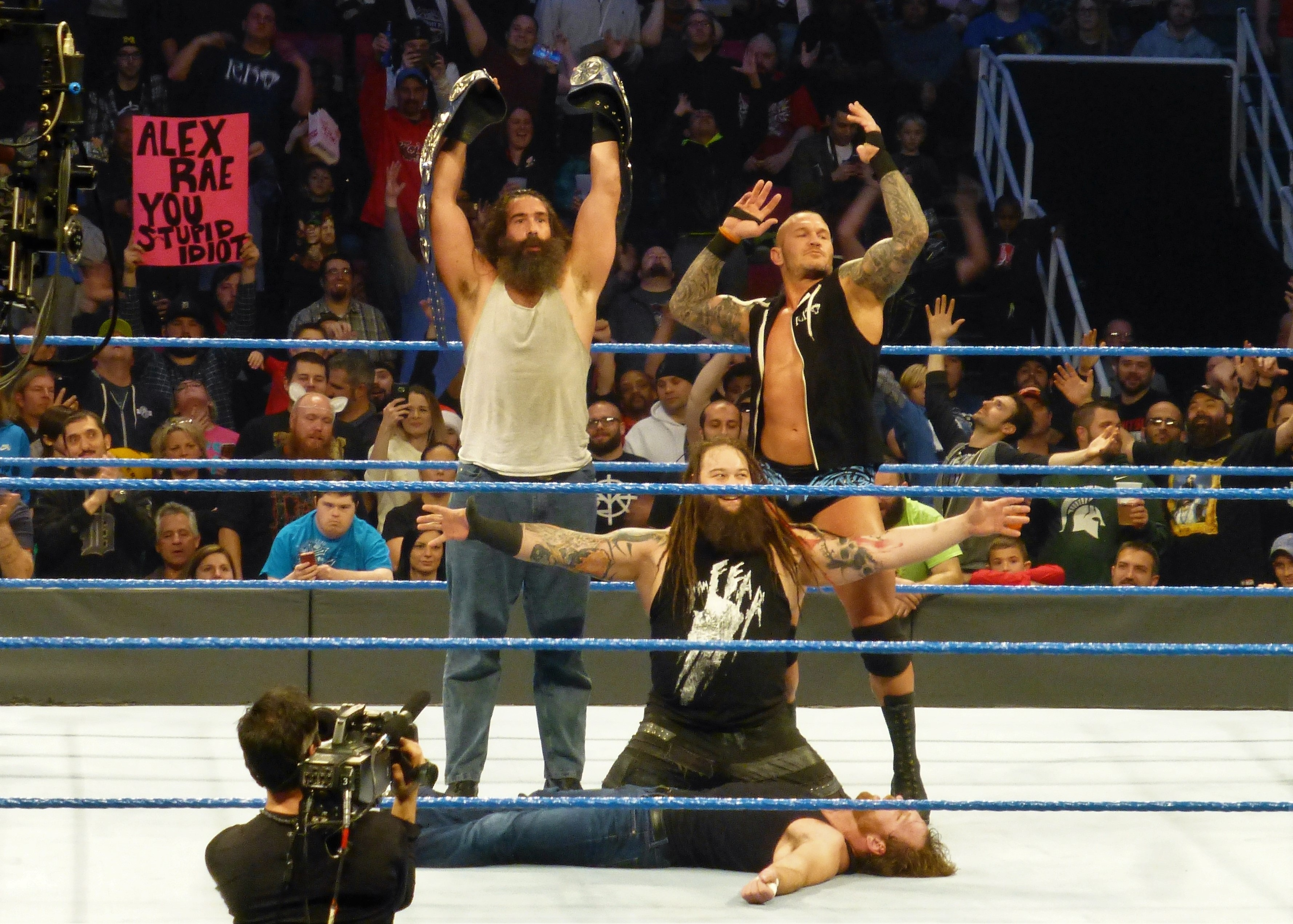
The "New" Wyatt Family as SmackDown Tag Team Champions: (from left to right) Harper, Wyatt, and Randy Orton posing over Dean Ambrose

On July 19 at the 2016 WWE draft, Wyatt and Rowan were drafted to SmackDown while Strowman was drafted to Raw, separating him from the group. On the August 16 episode of SmackDown Live, Wyatt walked away from Rowan after the latter lost his match against Dean Ambrose, leaving Rowan's sheep mask on Wyatt's rocking chair. Despite this, Rowan attacked Randy Orton on behalf of Wyatt on the September 13 episode of SmackDown Live, continuing their alliance. On October 9, Harper returned at the close of the SmackDown brand's event No Mercy on October 9 in a match between Wyatt and Orton, whom Harper distracted to help Wyatt win the match, thus realigning himself with Wyatt. Prior to Harper's return, Rowan underwent surgery to repair a torn rotator cuff and would be out of action for four to six months.

On the October 25 episode of SmackDown Live, Orton interfered on Wyatt's behalf in his match against Kane. On the November 1 episode of SmackDown Live, Wyatt and Harper helped Orton win in his respective match against Kane, thus confirming his allegiance to the group. At the 30th annual Survivor Series on November 20, Wyatt and Orton were the sole survivors for Team SmackDown in the traditional 5-on-5 Survivor Series elimination match after Orton saved Wyatt from a spear from Roman Reigns. On the November 29 episode of SmackDown Live, Wyatt and Orton defeated American Alpha to become the number one contenders for the SmackDown Tag Team Championship. They went on to challenge and defeat Heath Slater and Rhyno on December 4 at TLC: Tables, Ladders, & Chairs for the tag team titles, Wyatt Family's first championship in WWE's main roster. While Wyatt and Orton retained the SmackDown Tag Team Championship against the former champions on the December 6 episode of SmackDown Live, it was announced that the Wyatt Family invoked the Freebird Rule and thus allowing Harper to also defend the championship.

On the December 27 episode of SmackDown Live, the Wyatt Family began to show tension after they lost the SmackDown Tag Team Championship to American Alpha in a four-way elimination tag team match after Orton inadvertently hit Harper and was subsequently pinned. On the January 10, 2017, episode of SmackDown Live, they unsuccessfully attempted to regain the championship after another miscue between Orton and Harper, who accidentally performed a superkick on Wyatt after the match, resulting in Wyatt walking away in frustration. This continued the following week on SmackDown Live, when Orton lost to Ambrose after Harper distracted his teammates, causing Orton and Harper getting involved in another argument, which would physically escalate until they were separated by Wyatt, who struck Harper, resulting in Harper walking away. On the 24 January episode of SmackDown Live, Orton defeated Harper after which Wyatt attacked Harper with a Sister Abigail, but did not dictate whether he was kicked out of the group.

During the Royal Rumble match on January 29, Harper attacked both Orton and Wyatt, even attempting Sister Abigail on the latter before being attacked by Orton, who would then go on to win the Royal Rumble match. At Elimination Chamber on February 12, Orton defeated Harper while in the main event Wyatt won the WWE Championship in the Elimination Chamber match. On the following SmackDown Live, after Wyatt successfully defended the WWE Championship in a triple threat match involving John Cena and AJ Styles (despite a pre-match attack by Harper), Orton came to the ring, pledging allegiance to Wyatt and refusing to face him at WrestleMania 33. The following week on SmackDown Live, Wyatt gave Orton "the keys to the kingdom" which referred to the Wyatt Family's compound, but Orton turned on Wyatt by burning down the Wyatt Family compound on the February 28 episode of SmackDown Live before challenging him to a match at WrestleMania 33, seemingly disbanding the Wyatt Family in the process.

On the April 4 episode of SmackDown Live, Rowan returned from injury after nearly eight months of inactivity, sporting a new steampunk-style sheep mask, assisting Wyatt and attacking Orton (since Wyatt lost the WWE Championship to Orton at WrestleMania 33 on April 2), but later that night they lost a tag team match against Orton and Harper.

The Wyatt Family seemingly disbanded again when Wyatt was moved to the Raw brand during the 2017 WWE Superstar Shake-up, though Wyatt and Rowan continued their alliance, with Wyatt distracting Orton during his match with Rowan on the April 11 episode of SmackDown Live. On the April 25 episode of SmackDown Live, Rowan (still being referred to as a member of the Wyatt Family) competed in the main event against Orton in a no disqualification match which he lost. On the May 9 episode of SmackDown Live, Harper and Rowan faced each other in a match won by Rowan; the commentary team referred to both men as former members of the Wyatt Family, thus confirming the disbandment.

== Post-disbandment and deaths of Wyatt and Harper ==
In October 2017, Harper and Rowan reunited as The Bludgeon Brothers and went on to win the SmackDown Tag Team Championship at WrestleMania 34. After they lost their tag team titles, Rowan formed an alliance with former Wyatt Family member Bryan, with whom he would win his second SmackDown Tag Team Championship. After Rowan and Bryan's team dissolved, Rowan reunited with Harper before they were separated due to the 2019 WWE Draft. Harper was released in December 2019, and Rowan was released in April 2020. Strowman was released in June 2021, but would later return to the company in September 2022.

Strowman continued as a singles competitor, while Wyatt adopted the new character of "The Fiend" to continue his solo career. Wyatt spent a significant part of his stint as "The Fiend" feuding with former Wyatt Family members, namely Bryan, Strowman, and Orton, before being released in July 2021. He returned to WWE at the 2022 Extreme Rules event.

On December 26, 2020, at the age of 41, Harper (who had been performing in AEW as Brodie Lee) died from idiopathic pulmonary fibrosis. Numerous tributes were given by former colleagues, including his former Wyatt Family partners. On December 30, Rowan appeared on AEW's memorial show, the Brodie Lee Celebration of Life, holding up a sign dedicated to Harper that read, "Goodbye for now, my brother. See you down the road." At the end of the episode, various photos of Harper were shown, including several real-life moments shared with his Wyatt Family partners.

On August 24, 2023, at the age of 36, Wyatt died from a heart attack caused by a pre-existing heart condition that had been exacerbated by a COVID-19 infection. On the August 25 episode of SmackDown, Rowan and Strowman appeared onstage for Wyatt's memorial package and the traditional 10-bell salute. In mid-2024, Wyatt's real-life brother Bo Dallas (as his alter ego Uncle Howdy) began leading a heroic faction called The Wyatt Sicks alongside Rowan, Dexter Lumis, Joe Gacy, and Nikki Cross. Strowman was released from his WWE contract in May 2025, ending his second tenure of the company. On April 24, 2026, all members of The Wyatt Sicks were released by WWE.

== Members ==
*	Founding Member(s)
L	Leader(s)

Members		Joined	Left
	Daniel Bryan	December 30, 2013	January 15, 2014
	Braun Strowman	August 24, 2015	July 19, 2016
*	Luke Harper	November 7, 2012	February 1, 2017
	Randy Orton	October 25, 2016	March 1, 2017
*	Erick Rowan	November 7, 2012	May 9, 2017
*L	Bray Wyatt	November 7, 2012	May 9, 2017

== Championships and accomplishments ==
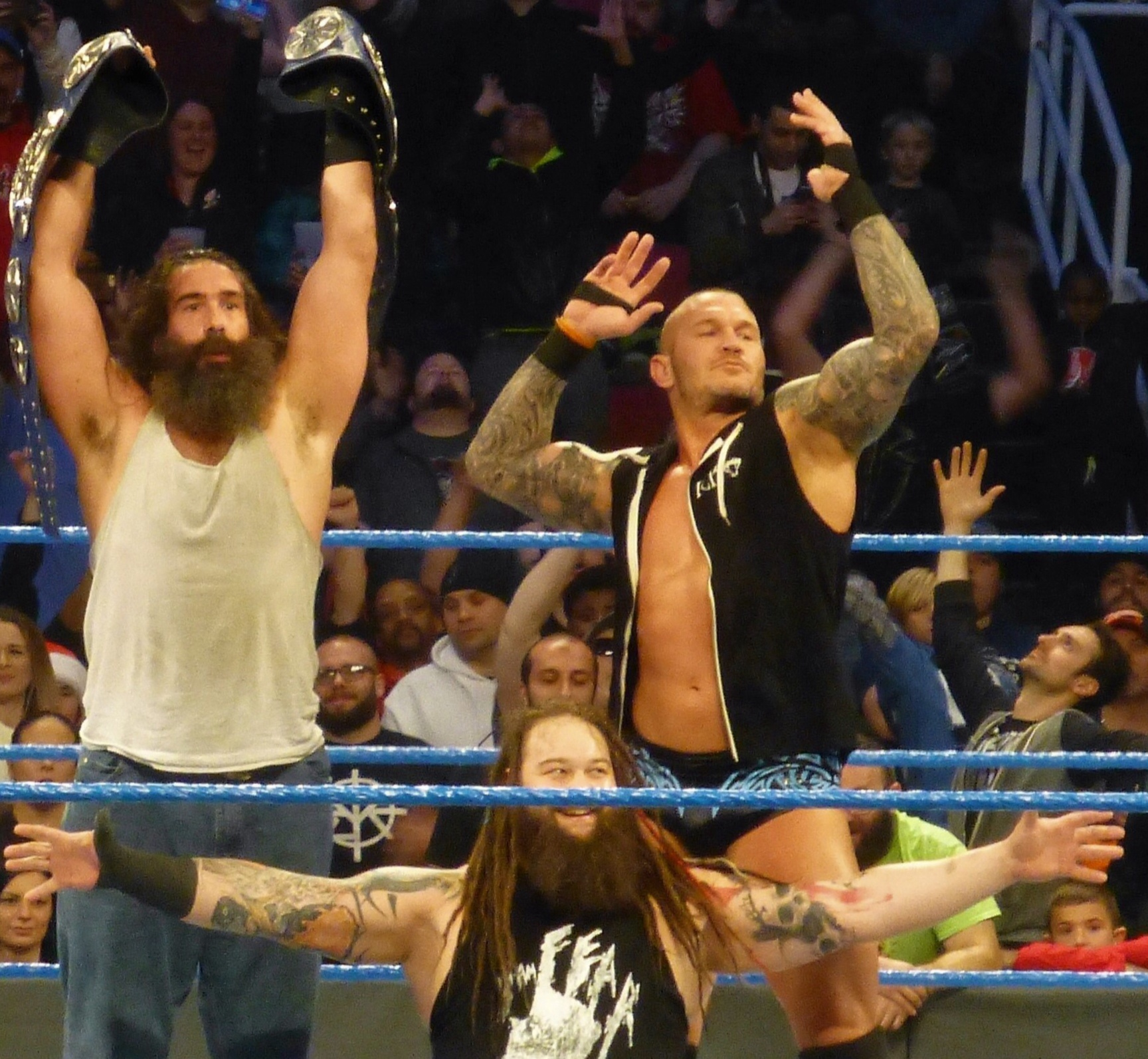
The Wyatt Family as SmackDown Tag Team Champions, with all three recognized as champions under the Freebird Rule

- Pro Wrestling Illustrated
  - Ranked Wyatt No. 6 of the top 500 singles wrestlers in the PWI 500 in 2014
  - Ranked Harper No. 24 of the top 500 singles wrestlers in the PWI 500 in 2015
  - Ranked Rowan No. 57 of the top 500 singles wrestlers in the PWI 500 in 2014
  - Ranked Bryan No. 1 of the top 500 singles wrestlers in the PWI 500 in 2014
  - Ranked Strowman No. 163 of the top 500 singles wrestlers in the PWI 500 in 2016
  - Ranked Orton No. 13 of the top 500 singles wrestlers in the PWI 500 in 2017
- Rolling Stone
  - Rookie of the Meh (2015) – Strowman
- Wrestling Observer Newsletter
  - Best Gimmick (2013) – Wyatt, Harper, and Rowan
- WWE
  - NXT Tag Team Championship (1 time) – Harper and Rowan
  - WWE Championship (1 time) – Wyatt
  - WWE SmackDown Tag Team Championship (1 time) – Wyatt, Orton, and Harper^{1}
  - Royal Rumble (2017) – Orton

^{1} Wyatt, Orton, and Harper defended the title under the Freebird Rule.

== See also ==
- The Wyatt Sicks
