= Erick Rowan =

American professional wrestler (born 1981)

- Rowan in 2022

Personal information
- Born: Joseph Ruud; November 28, 1981 (age 44) Minneapolis, Minnesota, U.S.
- Education: University of Minnesota Morris
- Spouse: Leah Ruud (m. 2019)
- Children: 3

Professional wrestling career
- Ring name(s): Erick Redbeard; Erick Rowan; Rowan; Thoruf; Thoruf Marius
- Billed height: 6 ft 8 in (203 cm)
- Billed weight: 315 lb (143 kg)
- Billed from: Minneapolis, Minnesota
- Trained by: Eddie Sharkey; Pro Wrestling Noah Dojo
- Debut: September 3, 2003

Joseph Ruud (born November 28, 1981), is an American professional wrestler. As of October 2026, he is signed to Total Nonstop Action Wrestling (TNA), where he performs under the ring name Erick Redbeard and is a member of the syX stable. He also performs on the independent circuit. He is best known for his tenures in WWE where he performed under the ring name Erick Rowan from 2011 to 2020 and again from 2024 to 2026.

Having previously wrestled in Japan, where he trained and performed for Pro Wrestling Noah, Ruud signed a contract with WWE in 2011. He was sent to its developmental territory, Florida Championship Wrestling (FCW), before debuting on the NXT brand in 2012, a member of The Wyatt Family. He went on to become a one-time NXT Tag Team Champion (with Luke Harper) and a two-time SmackDown Tag Team Champion (once with Harper and once with Daniel Bryan).

Ruud was released from WWE in April 2020, and returned to the independent circuit under the ring name Erick Redbeard, and appeared in All Elite Wrestling (AEW), also under said ring name. He returned to WWE in June 2024 as a member of The Wyatt Sicks and was released from WWE again in April 2026.

== Early life ==
Joseph Ruud was born in Minneapolis, Minnesota, on November 28, 1981. He grew up in Montrose, Minnesota. Ruud is of predominantly Norwegian descent, with his ancestors having emigrated to the United States from Nannestad, Norway. He also has some German ancestry. In High School he was a singer and played football. After graduation he attended the University of Minnesota Morris, where he continued to play football.

== Professional wrestling career ==
=== Independent circuit (2003–2011) ===
Ruud began his professional wrestling career after training with Eddie Sharkey in 2003. He debuted under the ring name "Thoruf Marius", competing for various promotions throughout the Midwest until 2007. He was invited to go to Pro Wrestling Noah's (NOAH) dojo in Japan to live, train, and wrestle. During this time, he competed in both tag team and singles matches. Following his tour in Japan, Ruud returned to the United States in 2008 and began competing for the Minnesota-based F1rst Wrestling promotion. Albeit, without much success. Upon joining the promotion, he began feuding with Big Brody Hoofer, with the pair exchanging wins across several events.

=== World Wrestling Entertainment / WWE (2011–2020) ===
==== Florida Championship Wrestling (2011–2012) ====
In February 2011, Ruud signed a developmental contract with World Wrestling Entertainment (WWE) and was assigned to their developmental territory Florida Championship Wrestling (FCW) under the ring name "Erick Rowan". He made his FCW TV debut in August 2011 with a win over Kenneth Cameron, while being accompanied by Byron Saxton and James Bronson. To tie in with Saxton's feud with Titus O'Neil, Rowan and Bronson lost to O'Neil and Leakee in a tag team match. Although Rowan continued to compete in both singles and tag team matches with Bronson, he was not involved in any further feuds and did not challenge for any titles on FCW TV.

==== The Wyatt Family (2012–2014) ====
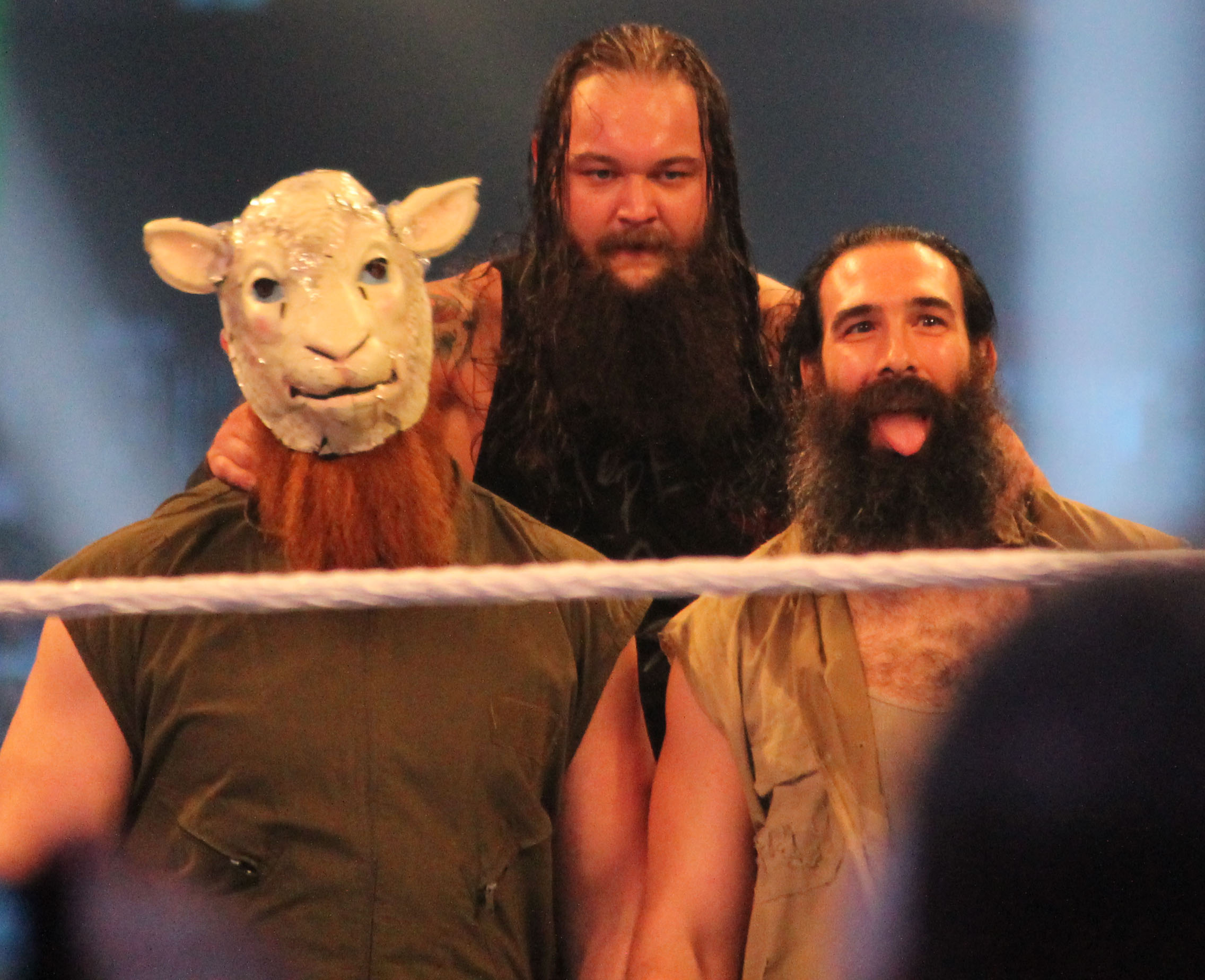
The Wyatt Family – Rowan (left), Bray Wyatt (center) and Luke Harper (right)

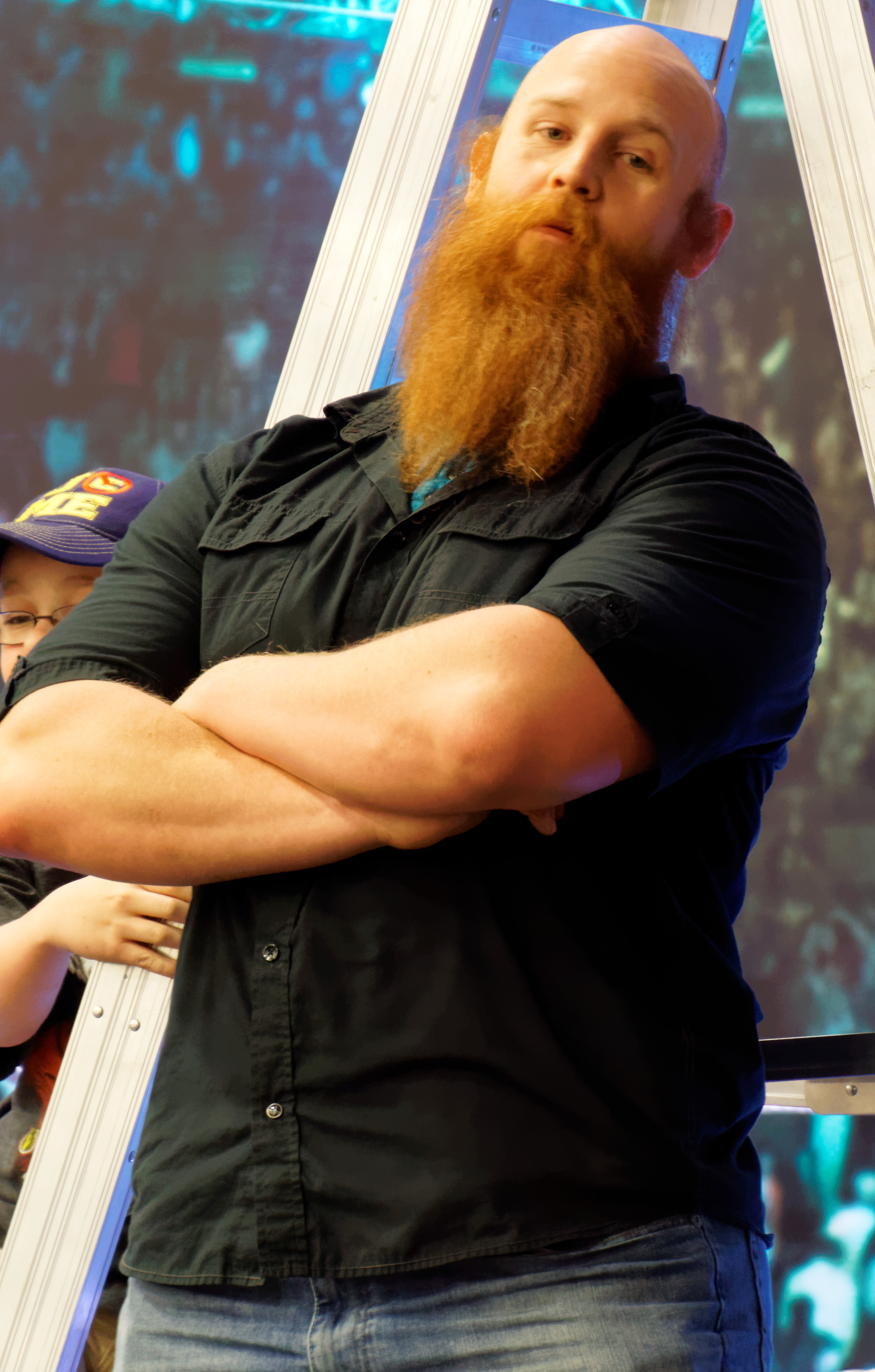
Rowan in 2016

After FCW was rebranded to NXT Wrestling, Rowan made his debut on the December 12, 2012 episode of NXT as a follower of Bray Wyatt, who introduced Rowan as his "second son". As a member of The Wyatt Family, Rowan formed a tag team with Wyatt's "first son" Luke Harper, and they defeated Percy Watson and Yoshi Tatsu on the January 9, 2013 episode of NXT. On the January 23 episode of NXT, Harper and Rowan again defeated Watson and Tatsu in the opening round of the NXT Tag Team Championship tournament. Following a win over Bo Dallas and Michael McGillicutty in the semi-finals after Wyatt's interference, Harper and Rowan were defeated in the finals by Adrian Neville and Oliver Grey. On the May 2 episode of NXT, Harper and Rowan won a triple threat elimination tag team match by last pinning Adrian Neville.

On the May 8 episode of NXT (which was taped on May 2), Harper and Rowan defeated Adrian Neville and Bo Dallas (who was filling in for the injured Oliver Grey) to win the NXT Tag Team Championship, Rowan's first professional wrestling championship. On the June 5 episode of NXT, Harper and Rowan successfully retained their championship against Corey Graves and Kassius Ohno, and on the June 19 episode of NXT, The Wyatt Family defeated the team of Neville, Graves and Ohno. On the July 17 episode of NXT (which was taped on June 20), Harper and Rowan lost the NXT Tag Team Championship to Neville and Graves.

From the May 27 episode of Raw, WWE aired vignettes promoting the upcoming main roster debut of The Wyatt Family. The vignettes showed The Wyatt Family's backwoods origins and Rowan wearing a sheep mask. On the July 8 episode of Raw, The Wyatt Family made their debut by assaulting Kane. Rowan made his WWE in-ring debut on the July 26 episode of SmackDown, where he teaming up with Harper to defeat Tons of Funk (Brodus Clay and Tensai) in a tag team match. Over the next few months, Rowan and Harper competed as a tag team and went on a winning streak over many teams, until Cody Rhodes and Goldust handed them their first loss on the October 11 episode of SmackDown. In early 2014, Rowan took part in The Wyatt Family's feud with The Shield, while also supporting Bray Wyatt in his feud against John Cena. While Cena and Wyatt's feud continued, Rowan and Harper also started a feud with The Usos, unsuccessfully challenging for the Tag Team Championship at Money in the Bank and Battleground.

==== Singles competition (2014–2015) ====
Beginning on September 29, vignettes were shown of Rowan and Harper being "set free" by Wyatt, marking the dissolution of The Wyatt Family and the transition of its members into singles competition. On the November 17 episode of Raw, Rowan had a brief feud with the Authority when he joined Team Cena for Survivor Series, going after his former Wyatt Family partner Luke Harper, who had joined Team Authority, turning face in the process. At Survivor Series, Rowan scored no eliminations and was himself eliminated by Harper, with the assistance of Seth Rollins; however, Team Cena later won the match. Afterwards, Rowan started a feud with Big Show, the team member who had betrayed the rest of Team Cena at the event. At TLC: Tables, Ladders and Chairs, Rowan was defeated by Big Show in a stairs match.

On the January 5, 2015 episode of Raw, Rowan, along with Dolph Ziggler and Ryback were (kayfabe) fired by The Authority for being a part of Team Cena. On the January 19 episode of Raw, Rowan, Ziggler and Ryback were rehired after Cena won a 3-on-1 handicap match against Seth Rollins, Big Show and Kane following assistance from Sting. On the January 22 episode of SmackDown, Rowan lost to Luke Harper in a qualifying match for the 2015 Royal Rumble. Despite this, Rowan appeared during the Royal Rumble match and attacked number 6 entrant Curtis Axel, before Axel could make his entrance to the ring, sparking a brief The Wyatt Family reunion with Harper and Wyatt, before all three men brawled. At Fastlane, Rowan teaming up with Ziggler and Ryback in a six-man tag team match against Seth Rollins, Big Show and Kane, which they lost. Rowan participated in the second annual André the Giant Memorial Battle Royal at WrestleMania 31, but was eliminated by Big Show.

==== Return of the Wyatt Family (2015–2017) ====
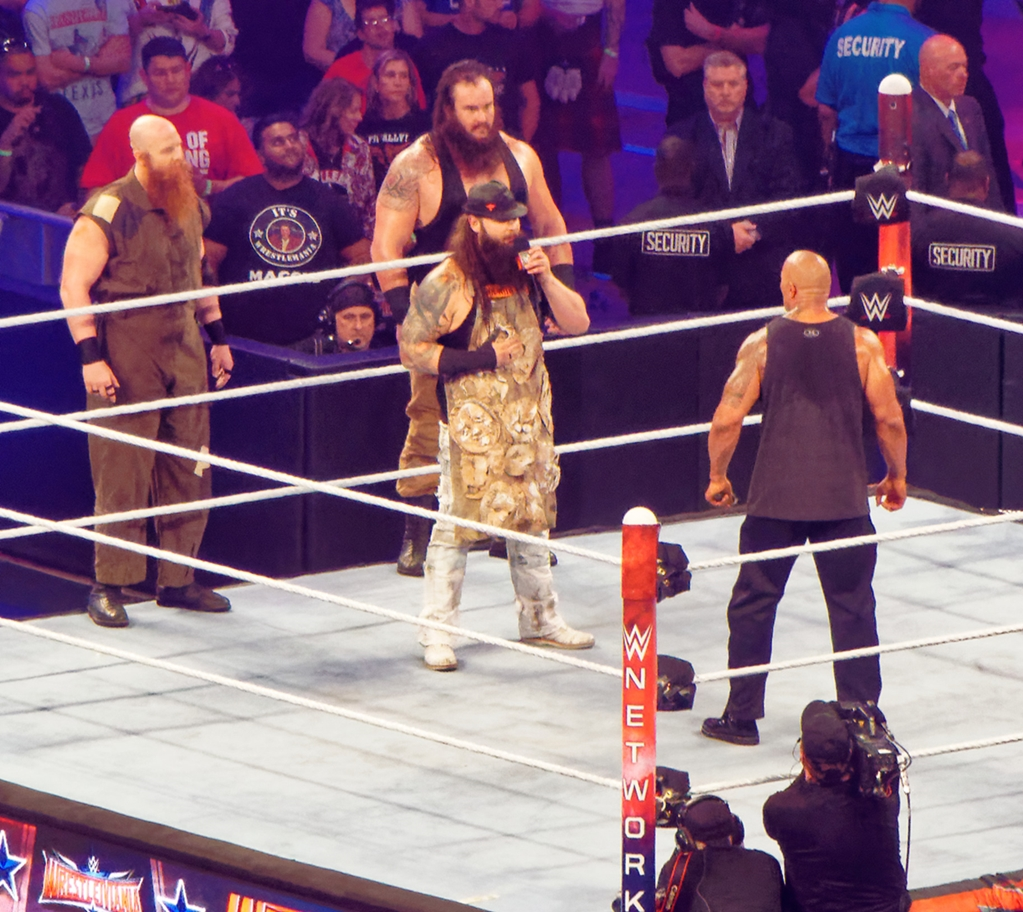
The Wyatt Family confronting The Rock at WrestleMania 32

In May, Rowan reunited with former tag team partner Luke Harper after attacking Harper's opponent Fandango, turning heel once again. In late June, Rowan suffered a torn bicep, leaving him out of action. Rowan returned on the October 19 episode of Raw as a member of The Wyatt Family once again, against Dean Ambrose, Roman Reigns, and Seth Rollins, which his team won by disqualification after Ambrose attacked new The Wyatt Family member Braun Strowman with a kendo stick. Rowan took part in The Wyatt Family's feud with The Brothers of Destruction, after they kidnapped The Undertaker at Hell in a Cell, and Kane on the October 26 episode of Raw. At TLC: Tables, Ladders, and Chairs, The Wyatt Family defeated ECW Originals in an eight-man tag team elimination tables match, with Rowan being the only Wyatt Family member eliminated from the match. On January 24, 2016, Rowan would go on to compete in the Royal Rumble match with fellow The Wyatt Family members and was eliminated by Brock Lesnar, but he would later return to the ring along with another members to eliminate Lesnar.

On April 3, Rowan competed in his first ever WrestleMania singles match at WrestleMania 32 against The Rock, after the latter confronted The Wyatt Family. Rowan was defeated by The Rock in six seconds, breaking the record for the quickest WrestleMania match of all time; after the match, when The Wyatt Family attempted to attack The Rock, a returning John Cena came to his aid. The next night on Raw, The Wyatt Family attacked The League of Nations, starting a feud between the heel factions. Rowan and Strowman were set to compete in a match at Payback, but Wyatt suffered a calf injury as well as Harper, who dislocated his patella and tore his medial patellofemoral ligament in late March. These injuries resulted in the suspension of the feud between The Wyatt Family and The League of Nations. The Wyatt Family (minus Harper) returned on the June 20 episode of Raw, subsequently getting into a feud with The New Day, who interrupted Wyatt during his return speech. The feud culminated at Battleground, where The Wyatt Family defeated The New Day.

On July 19, as part of 2016 draft, Rowan was drafted to SmackDown brand along with Bray Wyatt, while Braun Strowman was drafted to Raw. While Rowan kept wrestling with Wyatt, in October Rowan underwent surgery to repair a torn rotator cuff and would be out of action for eight months. He made his return on the April 4, 2017 episode of SmackDown Live. On April 10, The Wyatt Family disbanded again when Wyatt was moved to the Raw brand as part of Superstar Shake-up. The short rivalry between Rowan and Luke Harper was ended at Backlash on May 21, where Harper defeated Rowan.

==== The Bludgeon Brothers (2017–2018) ====
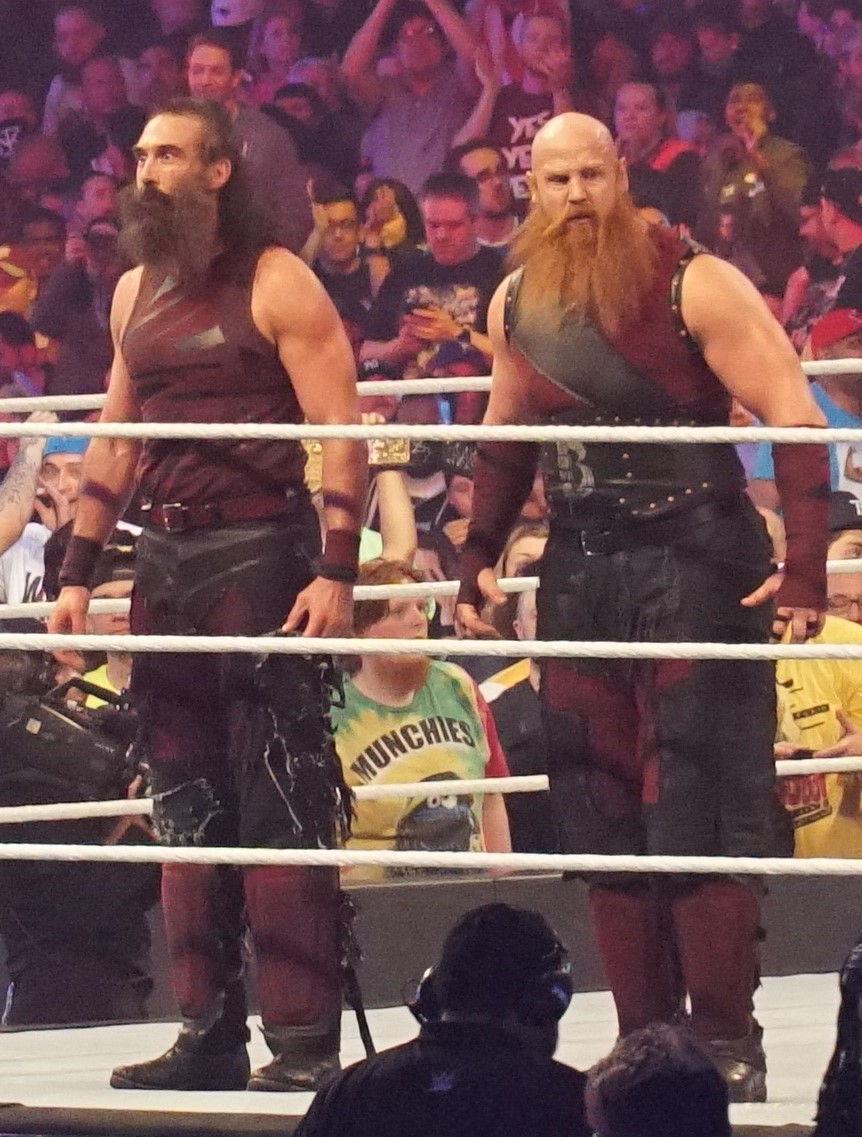
The Bludgeon Brothers at WrestleMania 34

On the October 10 episode of SmackDown Live, Rowan returned to television in a vignette where he was once again aligned with Luke Harper. The duo were dubbed as The Bludgeon Brothers, where his ring name shortened to "Rowan". The team wrestled their return match on the November 21 episode of SmackDown Live, defeating the Hype Bros (Zack Ryder and Mojo Rawley). At the Clash of Champions pay-per-view event, The Bludgeon Brothers defeated Breezango (Fandango and Tyler Breeze) in a squash match.

On March 11, 2018, The Bludgeon Brothers made an appearance at Fastlane, interfering during the SmackDown Tag Team Championship match between The Usos and The New Day. The team won the SmackDown Tag Team Championship at WrestleMania 34 from The Usos, a match also involving The New Day; this marked Rowan's first main roster championship win. They would go on to successfully defend the titles against The Usos at the Greatest Royal Rumble event, against Luke Gallows and Karl Anderson at Money in the Bank, and against Team Hell No at Extreme Rules.

The Bludgeon Brothers lost by disqualification in a championship defense against The New Day at SummerSlam, resulting in them retaining the titles. Two nights later on the August 21 episode of SmackDown Live, The New Day defeated The Bludgeon Brothers in a no disqualification match to win the championships, ending their reign at 135 days. The following day, it was announced that Rowan had suffered a torn right bicep and would have surgery later in the week.

==== Storyline with Daniel Bryan (2019–2020) ====
Rowan returned from injury at the Royal Rumble pay-per-view event on January 27, 2019, interfering on behalf of Daniel Bryan to help him retain the WWE Championship against AJ Styles, and forming an alliance with Bryan. On the February 26 episode of SmackDown Live, Rowan competed in his first match since August 2018, teaming with Bryan in a losing effort to Kofi Kingston and Kevin Owens. On the May 7 episode of SmackDown Live, Rowan and Bryan defeated The Usos for the vacant SmackDown Tag Team Championship, beginning their first reign as a team, and Rowan's second reign individually. At Money in the Bank, Rowan and Bryan were defeated by The Usos in a non-title match. The following month at Super ShowDown event, Rowan competed in the 51-man battle royal, but failed to win. At Stomping Grounds, Rowan and Bryan retained the SmackDown Tag Team Championship against Heavy Machinery (Otis and Tucker). At Extreme Rules, Rowan and Bryan lost the championship to The New Day in a triple threat match also involving Heavy Machinery, ending their reign at 68 days.

In August, Rowan and Bryan became involved in a storyline with Roman Reigns, as Reigns was being targeted for attacks by a mystery conspirator. Reigns suspected Rowan as his attacker due to testimony from Buddy Murphy, as well as seemingly incriminating video footage, but Bryan instead revealed that the attacker was merely a man who resembled Rowan. However, Rowan later turned on Bryan and revealed that he was the attacker the entire time, ending the alliance between the two. During this time, his ring name was reverted to Erick Rowan. Rowan would then face Reigns in a no disqualification match at Clash of Champions, which he won after interference from a returning Luke Harper. The feud concluded at Hell in a Cell, where Reigns and Bryan defeated Rowan and Harper in a tornado tag team match.

As part of the 2019 draft, Rowan was drafted to Raw, disbanding his team with Luke Harper, who remained on SmackDown. Starting in November, he would revert to his previous ring name Erick Rowan and began coming to the ring carrying a cage with a hidden cloth over it, as he would squash various local competitors, and Rowan would be shown to be very protective and affectionate of the creature in the cage destroying whoever tried to look inside the cage. Despite this, the creature would bite Rowan on multiple occasions which would force him to take out his pain on his opponents. At the Royal Rumble pay-per-view on January 26, 2020, Rowan entered Royal Rumble match at number 3, and was quickly eliminated by Brock Lesnar. On March 2 episode of Raw in a backstage segment with No Way Jose, Rowan revealed the mystery creature inside the cage to be a large spider. The next week on Raw, Rowan competed in his final match against Drew McIntyre, where mid-way through the bout, McIntyre crushed the cage with steel steps. On April 15, 2020, Rowan was released from his WWE contract along with several other superstars as a result of budget cuts in response to the COVID-19 pandemic, ending his 9-year tenure with the company.

=== Return to independent circuit (2020–2024) ===
Following his release from WWE, Ruud began taking bookings under the ring name "Erick Redbeard". On October 21, 2020, it was announced that he would be competing in the United Wrestling Network World Title tournament. He would make his debut on October 31, losing to Fred Rosser in the first round of the tournament by disqualification.

=== All Elite Wrestling (2020, 2022) ===
Following the death of his former WWE tag team partner Jon Huber (who performed as Luke Harper in WWE and Mr. Brodie Lee in All Elite Wrestling) on December 26, 2020, Ruud (as Erick Redbeard) appeared on the memorial AEW Dynamite episode "Brodie Lee Celebration of Life" on December 30, where he protected Dark Order members from being attacked by Wardlow during a six-man tag team match. After the match, he embraced the Dark Order, cried, and held up a sign that read: "Goodbye for now, my brother. See you down the road." Redbeard returned to AEW on the March 4, 2022 episode of AEW Rampage and aligned himself with Death Triangle (Pac and Penta Oscuro). The trio would team against House of Black (Malakai Black, Brody King, and Buddy Matthews) at Revolution's "Buy-In" pre-show event. The match would end with Redbeard getting pinned by Black.

=== Return to WWE (2023–2026) ===
On August 25, 2023, Ruud (as Erick Rowan) made a brief return in the start segment of SmackDown, which was a segment dedicated to his late friend Bray Wyatt, who died due to a heart attack the day before. In May 2024, it was reported that he had signed a contract with WWE and would be returning to the company.

On the June 17 episode of Raw, Ruud made his return, reprising the Erick Rowan character as a part of a new stable under the leadership of Uncle Howdy (portrayed by Wyatt's real-life brother Taylor) called The Wyatt Sicks. He would sport a rabbit mask, resembling Ramblin' Rabbit from Bray Wyatt's "Firefly Funhouse". On the July 15 edition of Raw, Rowan was seen unmasked in a vignette, where he was interviewed by Howdy, mourning the losses of his original Wyatt Family teammates, Bray Wyatt and Luke Harper. On August 5th, Rowan would make his in-ring return alongside fellow Wyatt Sicks stablemates Dexter Lumis and Joe Gacy to face American Made (Chad Gable and the Creed Brothers) in a winning effort. On the September 9 episode of Raw, the Wyatt Sicks defeated American Made in a Street Fight, ending their feud. The Wyatt Sicks' next feud was against The Miz and The Final Testament, facing each other on the December 9 episode of Raw, where the Wyatt Sicks suffered their first loss as a stable in an eight-man tag team match. The stable was drafted to the SmackDown brand, but didn't appear on television due to an injury to Uncle Howdy. The stable returned to television on the May 23 episode of SmackDown, attacking Street Profits, Fraxiom and DIY. On April 24, 2026, Rowan and the rest of the members of the Wyatt Sicks were released by WWE.

=== Second return to the independent circuit (2026-present) ===
Ruud made his return to the independent wrestling scene on July 30, 2026 at American Wrestling Federation’s Jack's Barn Brawl, where he performed under the name Erick Redbeard and defeated JDX. On October 3, at ECPW Autumn Aggression he performed under the name Erick Rowan and defeated Thad Howett.

=== Total Nonstop Action Wrestling (2026–present) ===
Ruud (as Erick Redbeard) made his Total Nonstop Action Wrestling (TNA) debut on October 11, 2026 at Bound for Glory, where he assisted syX (Joseph Sawyer and Samuel Shaw, formerly Gacy and Lumis respectively) in defeating the Hardys (Jeff Hardy and Matt Hardy) in a falls count anywhere match.

== Personal life ==
Since 2019, Ruud has been married to his wife Leah. He has one child from a previous marriage. In his spare time, Ruud plays the guitar and writes songs. Ruud is a fan of heavy metal music and its sub genres, particularly death metal. Some of his favorite bands include Amon Amarth, Korpiklaani, Children of Bodom and Cannibal Corpse. He is also known to be a fan of horror movies.

== Other media ==
In 2010 Ruud appeared on season 1 of the Norwegian based based reality show Alt for Norge, where he competed in challenges relating to Norwegian history and culture, competing to win a reunion with their distant Norwegian relatives. Ruud made his movie debut in October 2021 in the independent film Ghosts of the Ozarks where he played William.

Ruud has also made multiple appearances in music videos for the band Amon Amarth.

=== Filmography ===
==== Film ====
Year	Title	Role	Notes
2021	Ghosts of the Ozarks	William	

==== Television ====
Year	Title	Role	Notes
2010	Alt for Norge	Competitor	Season 1
2021	Mayor of Kingstown	Big Beard	Season 1, "Along Came a Spider", "The Devil Is Us"
2021	You Bet Your Life	Contestant	
2023	I Think You Should Leave with Tim Robinson	Toilet Truck	Season 3

==== Video games ====
Year	Title	Notes
2014	WWE 2K15	As "Erick Rowan"
2015	WWE 2K16	As "Erick Rowan"
2016	WWE 2K17	As "Erick Rowan"
2017	WWE 2K18	As "Erick Rowan"
2018	WWE 2K19	As "Erick Rowan/Rowan"
2019	WWE 2K20	As "Rowan"
2020	WWE 2K Battlegrounds	As "Erick Rowan"
2025	WWE 2K25	Part of The Wyatt Sicks Pre-Order DLC; As "Erick Rowan"
2026	WWE 2K26	As "Erick Rowan"

==== Music videos ====
Year	Song	Band	Role
2019	“Crack The Sky”	Amon Amarth	Himself
2022	“Get in the Ring”	Amon Amarth	Himself

== Championships and accomplishments ==
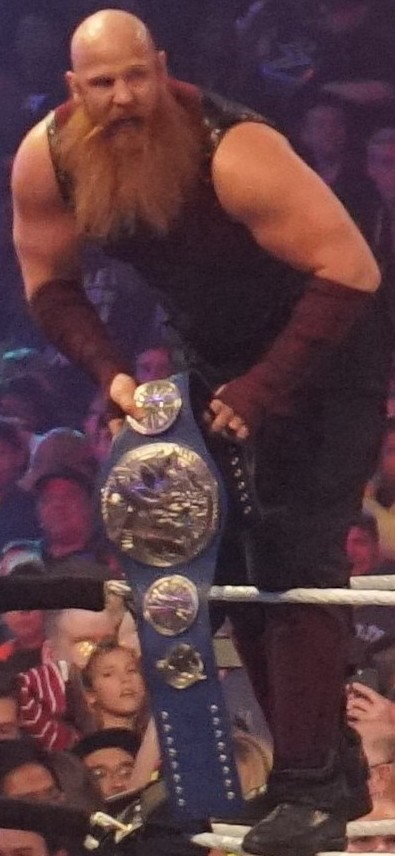
Rowan is a two-time WWE Smackdown Tag Team Champion

- French Lake Wrestling Association
  - FLWA Heavyweight Championship (1 time)
- Insane Wrestling Revolution
  - IWR World Heavyweight Championship (1 time)
- Pro Wrestling Illustrated
  - Ranked No. 57 of the top 500 singles wrestlers in the PWI 500 in 2014
- Universal Championship Wrestling
  - UCW Heavyweight Championship (1 time)
- Wrestling Observer Newsletter
  - Best Gimmick (2013) The Wyatt Family
- World Series Wrestling
  - WSW Tag Team Championship (1 time) – with Matt Basso
- WWE
  - WWE SmackDown Tag Team Championship (2 times) – with Harper (1) and Daniel Bryan (1)
  - NXT Tag Team Championship (1 time) – with Luke Harper
  - Slammy Award (2 times)
    - Match of the Year (2014) – Team Cena vs. Team Authority at Survivor Series
    - WTF Moment of the Year (2025) Wyatt Sicks debut on RAW with Bo Dallas, Dexter Lumis, Joe Gacy and Nikki Cross
- Other titles
  - Doublewide Bar Championship (1 time)
