= Kari Tauring =

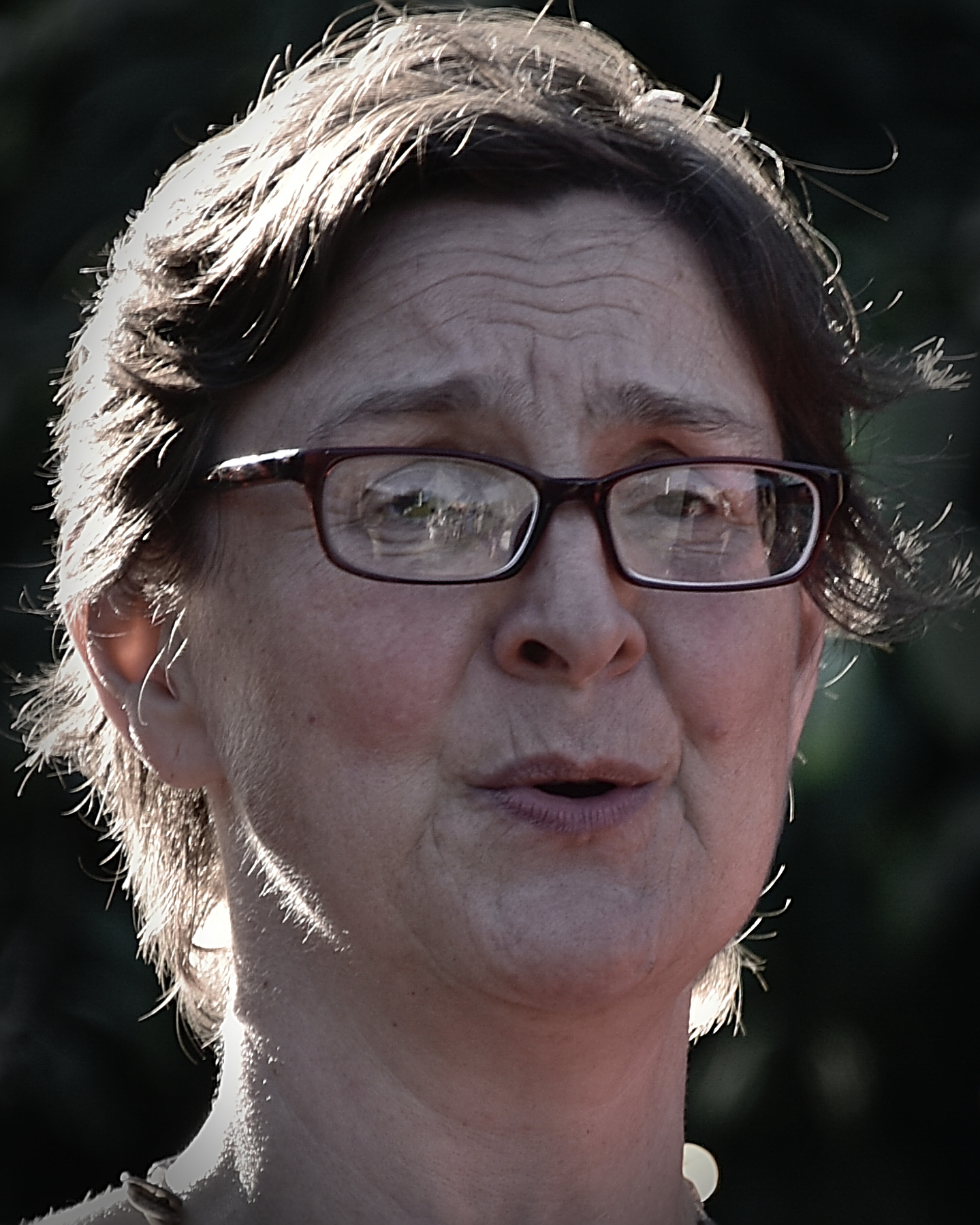

Background information
- Birth name: Kari Christine Tauring
- Born: July 4, 1966 (age 59); Minnetonka, Minnesota
- Genres: Folk, Nordic folk, gospel
- Occupation(s): Singer, songwriter
- Instrument(s): vocals, singer-songwriter, guitar, rhythmic stav
- Years active: 1990–present
- Website: karitauring.com

Kari Christine Tauring (born July 4, 1966) is an American folk musician, author, and teacher. She sings and writes Nordic folk music of her familial Norwegian heritage. Her career began in the early 1990s in Rose Absolute, a duo with vocalist Gina Sauer, while her first solo studio album, Faith in Me, was released in 1998. Tauring has released five albums, and an extended play.

== Early life and background ==
Tauring was born on July 4, 1966, in Minnetonka, Minnesota, the middle daughter of the five daughters had by Robert Walter Tauring and Grace Victoria Tauring (née, Engen), where she was raised in the Lutheran faith. While she spent most of her summers, with extended family in Wisconsin. She went to Luther College in Decorah, Iowa, where her collegiate studies began, while she transferred to University of St. Thomas in her native Minnesota, obtaining a double baccalaureate degree in English and philosophy, in 1990. Tauring eventually graduated with her Master of Arts in education from the same university, in 1996. She has been studying Runes, since the 1980s, while penning and publishing her first book about them in 2007, The Runes: A Human Journey. Tauring is an educator, teaching some classes at Minneapolis College of Art and Design in the subject areas of persuasion and negotiation.

== Music career ==
Tauring started in the early-1990s with touring in a band. Her music recording career began in 1998, when she released, Faith in Me. The subsequent studio album, A Yuletide Celebration, was released in 1999. She released, A New Yuletide Celebration, in 2001. Her fourth release, Völva Songs, an extended play, was released in 2009. The fourth album, Live at the Capri, was released featuring Huldre, was recorded in 2009, and released in 2010. Her fourth studio album, Nykken & Bear, was released in 2013. She released two single albums, Svart and Ljos in 2016 after a successful Kickstarter campaign.

== Personal life ==
Her first marriage ended in divorce in 1994 to Andrew N. Ahlstrom. Tauring is married to Gregory Lewis Traxler, and together they have two children, sons, Oskar and Jack.

Views on faith and religious practices

Her faith was developed by her grandfather, who lived in Wisconsin, where he was a spiritual farmer developing divining wells. She describes her faith as "Always full of questions about God, Tauring said the pastors at church 'would see me coming and run.' When she got antsy with all the formal, sometimes silent church prayer, her grandmother encouraged her to go outside in nature, and 'pray as loud as you want, talk to God like Jesus did.'...Tauring doesn't see Christianity and the practices of the pagans and heathens as inherently contradictory. She says she has 'a personal relationship' with Jesus, but not with any organized religion...'Just because something is pre-Christian doesn't mean it's anti-Christian,' she said. 'Jesus didn't invent compassion. He embodied it.'"

== Discography ==
Studio albums

- Faith in Me (1998)
- A Yuletide Celebration (1999)
- A New Yuletide Celebration (2001)
- Nykken & Bear (2013)
- Svart (2016)
- Ljos (2016)

Live albums

- Live at the Capri (2010, with Huldre)

EPs

- Völva Songs (2009)
