= The Wyatt Sicks =

Professional wrestling stable

Syx
- The stable's logo as The Wyatt Sicks

Stable
- Members: Joseph Sawyer/Joe Gacy; Samuel Shaw/Dexter Lumis; Erick Redbeard/Erick Rowan
- Name(s): The Wyatt Sicks; Syx
- Billed heights: Sawyer: 6 ft 0 in (1.83 m); Shaw: 6 ft 2 in (1.88 m); Redbeard: 6 ft 8 in (2.03 m)
- Former members: Uncle Howdy (leader); Nikki Cross
- Debut: June 17, 2024
- Years active: 2024–present

Syx (stylized as syX) is a professional wrestling stable that performs in Total Nonstop Action Wrestling (TNA). The stable consists of Joseph Sawyer, Samuel Shaw, and Erick Redbeard. They are best known for their time in WWE, where they performed as The Wyatt Sicks alongside Uncle Howdy and Nikki Cross.

As The Wyatt Sicks, the group was inspired by characters developed by Bray Wyatt for his Firefly Funhouse segments. Following Wyatt's death in August 2023, his real-life brother Bo Dallas returned as a dual character with his alter ego Howdy in June 2024, along with Rowan (Redbeard), Lumis, Gacy, and Cross, forming The Wyatt Sicks (a play on words of "Wyatt 6 (six)"), with the other members attire being inspired by the puppet characters of the Firefly Funhouse.

== Background ==
When Windham Rotunda, who worked as Bray Wyatt, returned to WWE at Extreme Rules in October 2022, he was accompanied by a mysterious character who Wyatt identified only as "Uncle Howdy", portrayed by Windham's real-life brother Taylor, who was previously known for performing in WWE as Bo Dallas. Uncle Howdy made numerous appearances, notably in segments involving Wyatt and Alexa Bliss' feud with Bianca Belair in January 2023; Bliss was previously involved in a storyline with Wyatt before Wyatt left WWE in 2021.

Wyatt and Howdy last appeared together on the February 17, 2023 episode of SmackDown, where Wyatt and Howdy laid out Hit Row, followed by Wyatt challenging the winner of Bobby Lashley vs. Brock Lesnar, which took place at that year's Elimination Chamber, to a match at WrestleMania 39. This would also be Wyatt's final physical appearance, as he was taken off television shortly afterward due to an undisclosed illness. Uncle Howdy had one further appearance on the following week's episode of SmackDown where he confronted Lashley, who had won at Elimination Chamber, before the storyline was dropped due to Wyatt's indefinite absence. Wyatt died on August 24 at the age of 36, with Uncle Howdy subsequently removed from WWE programming.

During the April 2024 documentary Bray Wyatt: Becoming Immortal, Taylor showed the unfinished ideas Windham had left. He also implied the return of Uncle Howdy, as seen during the ending of the documentary which saw Howdy's silhouette standing behind Wyatt's lantern. Prior to Wyatt's death, there had been online speculation that he and Howdy would be forming a new version of The Wyatt Family called the Wyatt 6 which would include real-life versions of his Firefly Funhouse puppet characters, which had been seen upon his Extreme Rules return and at the 2023 Royal Rumble.

== History ==
=== WWE (2024–2026) ===
==== Feud with American Made (2024–2025) ====
At the beginning of 2024, WWE launched an alternate reality game nicknamed "Nightbird". Over the following months, they aired vignettes at live events and during commercial breaks of televised shows, accompanied by production glitches playing out to a Marti Amado song called "Nightbird". In addition, following WrestleMania XL in April 2024, short screen distortions appeared at various times during WWE programming, with each glitch displaying a QR code leading to websites containing imagery, minigames, and riddles that vaguely referenced the return of Uncle Howdy, in addition to his stable (very similar to how Wyatt returned at the 2022 Extreme Rules). In some cases, WWE's social media profiles and other avenues were taken over by Howdy. This included instances such as including a QR code for WWE 2K24 that appeared when launching the game.

At the end of the June 17, 2024 episode of Raw, the arena lights went out and a door appeared on stage, similar to how Wyatt returned at the 2022 Extreme Rules. The door opened to reveal Nikki Cross crawling from the door towards Wyatt's lantern, before standing up and directing the cameraman to go backstage where it was shown that numerous unnamed WWE backstage staff, several security personnel, and Chad Gable, had been brutally attacked. Erick Rowan, Dexter Lumis, and Joe Gacy were seen standing over the carnage at various points, before finally revealing Uncle Howdy, who led the group out onto the stage to Cross before grabbing the lantern and proclaiming "we're here" and blowing it out, similar to Wyatt. It was then revealed that the group was called The Wyatt Sicks (a play on words of "Wyatt 6 (six)"), with Cross, Rowan, Lumis, and Gacy portraying the respective Firefly Funhouse characters Abby the Witch, Rambling Rabbit, Mercy the Buzzard, and Huskus the Pig Boy.

On the June 24 episode of Raw, Bo Dallas appeared and "being interviewed" by his alter ego Uncle Howdy, Dallas lamenting his brother Bray Wyatt's death. The group would have their first match on the August 5 episode of Raw, where Rowan, Lumis, and Gacy would team up to face the newly formed team "American Made" (Chad Gable and The Creed Brothers), where The Wyatt Sicks would win after Lumis pinned Gable. On the August 26 episode of Raw, Howdy would take on Gable in a singles match, in which Howdy won after interference from both American Made and The Wyatt Sicks, before performing the Sister Abigail. On the September 9 episode of Raw, The Wyatt Sicks defeated American Made in a Street Fight, ending their feud. They started a feud with The Miz and The Final Testament (Karrion Kross and AOP), facing each other on the December 9 episode of Raw, where The Wyatt Sicks suffered their first loss as a stable in an eight-man tag team match.

==== WWE Tag Team Champions and departure (2025–2026) ====
In January 2025, The Wyatt Sicks were moved to the SmackDown as a result of the "transfer window" between the two brands, but due to an injury sustained by Howdy, they did not appear on television until the May 23 episode of SmackDown, when they attacked The Street Profits, Fraxiom, and DIY. On the July 11 episode of SmackDown, Lumis and Gacy defeated The Street Profits to win the WWE Tag Team Championships.

By late November, the group began its feud with Solo Sikoa and the MFT stable (consisting of The Tongans and JC Mateo) following the latter's win in a Survivor Series match on the November 28 episode of SmackDown where Howdy attacked Sikoa. Then on the January 9, 2026 episode of SmackDown, The Wyatt Sicks were defeated by the MFT in an eight-man tag team match after Sikoa stole Bray Wyatt's lantern. On the January 23 episode of SmackDown, Lumis and Gacy lost the WWE Tag Team Championship to Sikoa and Tama Tonga of The MFT ending their reign at 196 days. However, Tama Tonga returned the lantern to Howdy, then the group would lose to the MFTs in an eight-man tag team street fight match on the WrestleMania 42 go-home episode of SmackDown on April 17, ending the feud. On April 24, all members of the Wyatt Sicks were released by WWE.

=== Total Nonstop Action Wrestling (2026–present) ===
On the September 24, 2026, episode of Thursday Night Impact!, Gacy and Lumis, under the ring names Joseph Sawyer and Samuel Shaw, made their Total Nonstop Action Wrestling (TNA) debut and return, respectively, as the tag team Syx, attacking The Hardys (Jeff Hardy and Matt Hardy) and revealing themselves as the perpetrators behind the mysterious attacks in the previous weeks, establishing themselves as heels. On October 10 at Bound for Glory, Rowan (now under the ring name Erick Redbeard) rejoined the stable after assisting Sawyer and Shaw to defeat The Hardys in a Falls Count Anywhere match.

== Members ==
*	Founding member(s)
L	Leader

Joseph Sawyer

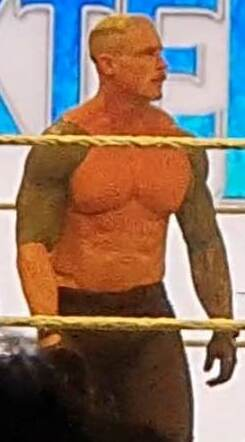
Samuel Shaw

Erick Redbeard

=== Current ===
Member		Joined
Joe Gacy/Joseph Sawyer	*	June 17, 2024
Dexter Lumis/Samuel Shaw	*	June 17, 2024
Erick Rowan/Erick Redbeard	*	June 17, 2024

=== Former ===
Member		Joined	Left
Uncle Howdy (L)	*	June 17, 2024	April 24, 2026
Nikki Cross	*	June 17, 2024	April 24, 2026

== Championships and accomplishments ==
- WWE
  - WWE Tag Team Championship (1 time) – Lumis and Gacy
  - Slammy Award (1 time)
    - WTF Moment of the Year (2025) – The Wyatt Sicks' debut on Raw

== Other media ==
In late July 2025, Universal Studios announced that The Wyatt Sicks would get their own Haunted House under the name "WWE Presents: The Horrors of the Wyatt Sicks" as part of Halloween Horror Nights 2025 at both Orlando and Hollywood locations.
