= League of Nations (professional wrestling) =

WWE villainous professional wrestling stable

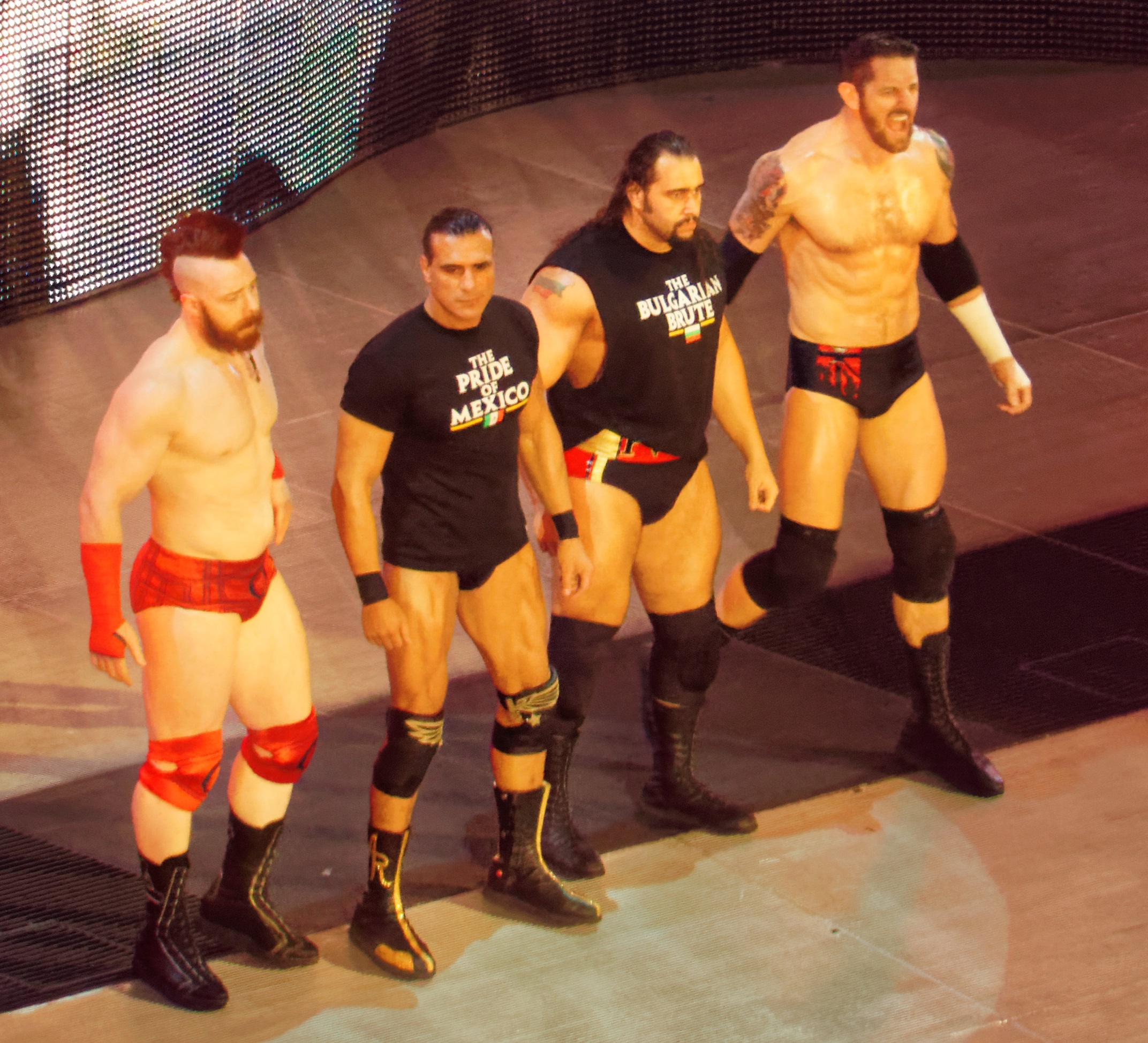
- The League of Nations in April 2016

Stable
- Members: Alberto Del Rio; King Barrett; Rusev; Sheamus
- Debut: November 30, 2015
- Disbanded: April 28, 2016

The League of Nations was a villainous professional wrestling stable active in WWE from late 2015 to early 2016, and was composed of Alberto Del Rio, King Barrett, Rusev, and Sheamus. The concept of the group came from the idea that all of its members were immigrants to the United States and banded together to represent their respective nations while displaying anti-American sentiments. Formed during a time when WWE was attempting to push and establish Roman Reigns as the face of the company, critics panned the group for being created by the company solely for the purpose of being defeated by Reigns. Former members of the group have since voiced similar criticisms.

== History ==
The group was formed on the November 30, 2015, episode of Raw, where Del Rio, Barrett, and Rusev attacked Reigns during his WWE World Heavyweight Championship match against the champion Sheamus. Sheamus retained the championship despite losing via disqualification, and declared the group as the League of Nations, citing the different nationalities of each members. Later on the episode, they teamed with The New Day to defeat Dean Ambrose, Reigns, and The Usos in a 7-on-4 handicap match. The same week on SmackDown, however, they lost 4-on-1 to Reigns via countout. Sheamus would retain the championship once again against Reigns at TLC: Tables, Ladders & Chairs on December 13, following interference from Del Rio and Rusev in a TLC match. However, he lost the championship the following night on Raw, despite help from Del Rio, Mr. McMahon, and Rusev.

While the group continued their rivalry with Reigns and his allies in January 2016, Del Rio lost his United States Championship on an episode of Raw to Kalisto, but regained it on the following SmackDown with the help of Barrett. Del Rio would lose the championship to Kalisto once again at the Royal Rumble on January 24. In the Royal Rumble match later at the event, Reigns ended up eliminating Del Rio, Rusev, and Sheamus, before which the three members ambushed him under McMahon's orders.

Over the following months, the League of Nations feuded with The New Day, the WWE Tag Team Champions. After two unsuccessful title challenges, Del Rio, Rusev, and Sheamus defeated The New Day in a non-title six-man tag team match at WrestleMania 32 on April 3. Following their victory, the group was attacked by Mick Foley, Shawn Michaels, and Stone Cold Steve Austin.

On the April 4 episode of Raw, after losing a final title match to The New Day, the League of Nations turned on Barrett, ejecting him from the stable for being the "weak link." Immediately following the expulsion, the remaining members were attacked by The Wyatt Family. This storyline was abruptly cancelled later that month after Bray Wyatt suffered a calf injury. In their final appearance, the group competed in a six-man tag team match on the April 28 episode of SmackDown; during the match, Del Rio and Rusev walked out on Sheamus. Following a backstage confrontation and brawl between the members later that night, Sheamus officially disbanded the League of Nations.

== Reception ==
Critics panned WWE's handling of the League of Nations. Wrestling Observer Newsletter writer Steve Khan wrote on the League's purpose for existence in December 2015, "You can rightfully complain about the League of Nations losing to one guy on their second night as a team, but we all know they don't really matter. They exist to get Roman Reigns over." In March 2016, Pro Wrestling Dot Net writer Haydn Gleed criticized how WWE squandered the four men's combined potential and still never explained in storyline why the League of Nations had formed, noting that they had become "bad guns for hire who never accomplish their task(s)" instead of a "credible threat". Also in that month, Pro Wrestling Torch writer Greg Parks said that for the members of the League, "most of them are less over (and certainly less interesting) than when the group was created".

In a September 2016 interview, Sheamus said, "The whole League of Nations thing wasn't everyone's cup of tea for those of us involved, it didn't do any of us any favours." He also said he felt "stuck in a rut" for the first time in his career while he was part of the group, which he said was "set up to make Roman Reigns a babyface". In an interview shortly after his departure from WWE, Barrett also said that the stable was merely a foil for Reigns. According to sports journalist Dave Meltzer, the faction "wasn't a success" and, along with his pairing with Zeb Colter, saw Del Rio take a less prominent role onscreen as his high-profile feud with John Cena was halted. Upset with his spot in the company, Del Rio requested his release and it was granted in September. The poor reception was also worked into a 2016 in-character (kayfabe) interview with Rusev, who said the faction was a "bad idea" and that he was "thrown off" during his time in it. During an out-of-character interview in 2020, he said, "Theoretically, on paper, it could have been the best faction in history, but they never had a chance. They were there to be a punching bag for Roman Reigns, which is okay. We did great, we built him up and he went on to win the title [at WrestleMania] so we did our job right." Rusev and Del Rio have spoken about real-life animosity between the faction members, which nearly led to a backstage altercation before their match at WrestleMania 32.

== Championships and accomplishments ==
- WWE
  - WWE United States Championship (2 times) – Alberto Del Rio
  - WWE World Heavyweight Championship (1 time) – Sheamus
