= Dexter Lumis =

American professional wrestler (born 1984)

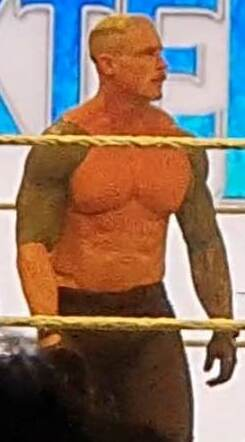
- Lumis in 2023

Personal information
- Born: Samuel Robert Shaw; January 17, 1984 (age 42) Jacksonville, Florida, U.S.
- Education: Savannah College of Art and Design

Professional wrestling career
- Ring name(s): Boss Hogg; Dexter Lumis; Sam Shaw; Samuel Shaw
- Billed height: 6 ft 2 in (188 cm)
- Billed weight: 239 lb (108 kg)
- Billed from: Jacksonville Beach, Florida; Recluse, Wyoming "An Undisclosed Location" (residing)
- Trained by: Curtis Hughes; WWA4 Wrestling School; Bubba Ray Dudley; D-Von Dudley
- Debut: September 21, 2007

Samuel Robert Shaw (born January 17, 1984) is an American professional wrestler. He is signed to Total Nonstop Action Wrestling (TNA), where he performs under his real name and is a member of the syX stable. He also makes appearances on the independent circut. He is known for his tenure in WWE, where he performed under the ring name Dexter Lumis.

Born in Jacksonville, Florida, Shaw started his professional wrestling career in 2007 on the independent circuit. In 2010, he signed with TNA where he won the TNA Gut Check challenge in 2012 before spending a stint in its then-developmental territory Ohio Valley Wrestling, later returning in 2013. Upon departing TNA in 2015, Shaw returned to the independent wrestling scene for the next 5 years until signing with WWE in 2019. He was released in April 2022, and returned once more to the independent circuit before returning to WWE in August 2022 until April 2026. In September 2026 makes his return to TNA alongside Joesph Sawyer as Syx.

== Early life ==
Shaw was born in January 1984, in Jacksonville, Florida. He attended Allen D. Nease High School in St. Augustine, Florida, and graduated from the Savannah College of Art and Design in 2006. Shaw made his way to Orlando to work as an illustrator for Universal Studios, after which he returned to his hometown of Jacksonville and began working for the Riverside Arts Market drawing caricatures, with a side business creating "pet ornaments", drawing pictures of people's pets on Christmas ornaments.

== Professional wrestling career ==
=== Early career (2007–2012) ===
After training with Curtis Hughes at the WWA4 Wrestling School, Shaw made his professional wrestling debut on September 21, 2007, at World League Wrestling, where he teamed up with Tookie Tucker to defeat Marco Cordova and Otis Idol in a tag team match. Shaw lost to Bruce Santee on August 3, 2009, at Full Impact Pro. On August 21, 2010, he took on VSK at Victory Pro Wrestling in a match for VPW New York State Championship. Shaw was also part of a Gold Rush Rumble. He lost both matches. On May 18 Shaw teamed up with Q. T. Marshall in a losing effort to the Briscoe Brothers for Ring of Honor. He has also wrestled sporadically for Pro Wrestling Extreme.

On April 18, 2009, Shaw debuted for Vintage Wrestling defeating Nooie Lee on his debut. Just over a month later on May 30, Shaw defeated Glacier to become the first Vintage Heavyweight Champion. Over the months, Shaw would defend his championship on multiple occasions against the likes of Tyson Tomko and Jesse Neal. Shaw would finally lose the championship to Thomas Marr on February 2, 2011. On April 17, Shaw would become a second-time champion after winning the vacant Vintage Heavyweight Championship and would lose it to Jesse Neal on September 11. In 2011, Shaw participated in the King Of The State tournament and reached the finals before losing to Francisco Ciatso. On May 14, Shaw would win his third Vintage Heavyweight Championship by defeating Aaron Epic. On September 3, Shaw was part of a title vs title match where the Vintage Heavyweight Championship and the Vintage Internet Championship were on the line, Shaw won the match after Simon Sez was disqualified which also meant the championship would not change hands. He lost the Vintage Heavyweight Championship to Francisco Ciatso on June 6, 2012. His last match for the company took place a month later in a fatal four-way match for the Vintage Heavyweight Championship which Milo Beasley won.

On August 8, 2011, in his debut match for Florida Underground Wrestling, he took on Romeo Razel and Sideshow in a three-way match and won, this would lead to a shot at the FUW Heavyweight Champion, Bruce Santee, which Shaw lost. On June 28, 2012, he took on Wes Brisco FUW Cuban Heavyweight Championship, where he lost. His last match for FUW came in the form of a win on June 30 against James Alexander.

=== Total Nonstop Action Wrestling (2010–2015) ===
==== Gut Check (2010–2013) ====
Shaw's first appearance for Total Nonstop Action Wrestling (TNA) was on August 8, 2010, in Hardcore Justice as Lupus, Shaw attacked Tommy Dreamer in his match against Raven before he was attacked by special referee Mick Foley with a Mandible Claw. Shaw's first match for TNA came on August 9, 2010, in a dark match against Jesse Neal which he lost. On the December 30 episode of TNA Impact!, Shaw accompanied Jeff Jarrett to the ring as part of his entourage in his $100,000 Double J MMA Challenge against Little Red.

In 2012, Shaw was a participant in the monthly Gut Check on IMPACT. Although his chances were nearly ruined after he was attacked by Aces & Eights, Shaw got a second chance the following week and was defeated by Doug Williams in his Gut Check match. The Gut Check judges were impressed and awarded Shaw a contract and a spot on the TNA roster. In actuality, Shaw was signed to a developmental contract. Shaw returned to Impact Wrestling on November 22, defeating fellow Gut Check winner Alex Silva.

On January 12, 2013, Shaw appeared at TNA X-Travaganza, wrestling in a seven-man Xscape match, which was won by Christian York, that aired on April 5, 2013. On March 17, 2013, Shaw appeared at TNA Hardcore Justice 2 where he was part of a nine-man Hardcore Gauntlet Battle Royal, which was won by Shark Boy, that aired on July 5, 2013. Shaw returned on the May 23 edition of Impact Wrestling defeating Alex Silva (by decision since Aces & Eights attacked Silva) to advance into the finals of the Bound for Glory Series tournament to face Jay Bradley at Slammiversary. Shaw lost to Bradley at Slammiversary.

==== Ohio Valley Wrestling (2012–2013) ====
Shaw was then assigned to TNA's developmental territory Ohio Valley Wrestling (OVW), making his televised debut on October 13, 2012. He then began teaming with Alex Silva, forming a regular tag team over the coming weeks. On December 1, Shaw and Silva defeated Jessie Godderz and Rudy Switchblade to win the OVW Southern Tag Team Championship. They lost the title to Crimson and Jason Wayne on January 16, 2013. But regained the titles having their second reign on February 27, 2013. However, they lost the titles to The Coalition on April 3, 2013. The following week, Shaw was attacked backstage by the Coalition. Shaw would return to OVW TV on May 4 after revealing that he had been under the mask of the Coalition's Gillyman for several weeks and was put in a one-on-one match against Jason Wayne at the May 11 Saturday Night Special. He would have his in-ring return the following week one-on-one against Godderz. Shaw would continue his war with the Coalition in a victory over Jason Wayne at the May 11 Saturday Night Special and a victory over Crimson on the May 18 episode of OVW TV.

==== Samuel Shaw (2013–2015) ====
On November 21 during Impact Wrestling: Turning Point, Shaw appeared in an at home interview with Christy Hemme. During the interview, he asked to be called "Samuel Shaw" and also portrayed a character similar to Patrick Bateman of the film and book American Psycho, as well as a ring attire similar to the clothes worn by Dexter Morgan. On the January 2, 2014 episode of Impact Wrestling, Shaw made his debut as a heel by defeating Norv Fernum via submission, during which he made continuous glares at Hemme who was at ringside. Shaw later became an obsessed fan of Hemme, and started asking her on dates, including one in his house where it was shown how Shaw had a room full of posters and pictures of Hemme. On the February 6 episode of Impact Wrestling, Hemme confronted Shaw about the mannequin and the room full of posters. On the February 20 episode of Impact Wrestling, Shaw attacked Mr. Anderson in a rage after watching Hemme and Anderson converse for several minutes. Shaw then carried Hemme away after she was accidentally caught up in the ruckus and injured. On the February 27 episode of Impact Wrestling, Shaw would confront Hemme in an attempt to explain himself. After failing and being interrupted by Mr. Anderson, Shaw would solidify himself as a heel after using Hemme as a shield to fend off Mr. Anderson who was attempting to exact revenge for the previous week. Shaw would use his kata gatame finishing move to choke out Mr. Anderson.

On the March 6 edition of Impact Wrestling, Shaw faced off against Eric Young with Mr. Anderson replacing Hemme as the ring announcer for the match. Anderson's presence at ringside ultimately cost Shaw the match as he would be disqualified due to Anderson's distraction. After the match, Shaw would choke out Anderson like last week then claim he was "going to claim what was rightfully his," heading for the backstage area where Hemme had been watching via a ring monitor. Three days later, at Lockdown, Shaw defeated Mr. Anderson after escaping the cage following the use of Christy Hemme as a distraction by pulling Hemme through the camera cut-out of the steel cage, Anderson successfully rescued Hemme but was caught in Shaw's kata gatame. The previously unconscious referee only saw Shaw escape the cage thus declaring him the winner. Shaw lost a rematch against Anderson on the following Impact Wrestling bringing a mannequin dressed as Christy Hemme to the ring. On the April 3 episode of Impact Wrestling, Shaw defeated Mr. Anderson in a Straitjacket match after rendering him unconscious following two kata gatame attempts. At Sacrifice, Anderson defeated Shaw in a Committed match, whereby he put Shaw into a van heading for a psychiatric facility for intervention.

The next time Shaw appeared on TV was on the May 22 episode of Impact Wrestling at the psychiatric facility. A man walked in and said that Shaw had a visitor who was later revealed to be Gunner. Gunner said he was going to help him with his obsession with Hemme and with his insanity. Over the weeks following, segments were shown in which Gunner tried to help Shaw in various ways by explaining to Shaw why he understood what Shaw was going through and participating in various activities like going through Shaw's drawings & playing Go Fish with Shaw, which eventually led to Shaw being released under Gunner's supervision on June 26 episode of Impact. On July 3, he returned and apologized to Christy Hemme as well as to Mr. Anderson, who gave Samuel Shaw another chance to be friends with him as long as he followed Gunner's supervision, seemingly turning face. On October 22, 2014, episode on Impact, Shaw reverted to a villain after he hit Gunner with a steel chair and aligned with Brittany. The alliance between Shaw and Brittany ended after she did not re-sign with TNA. His final TNA match took place on June 19, 2015, against Crimson on TNA Xplosion. During the Christy Hemme storyline, he was dubbed as the 'creepy bastard'.

On June 21, 2015, Shaw officially announced his departure from the company.

=== Independent circuit (2015–2019) ===
In May 2015, Shaw returned to Vintage Wrestling. In his first match back, on May 16, 2015, Shaw defeated Nick Fame and the next day on May 17, 2015, Shaw, BeastMode (Biff Slater & Don Maximo), Leo Gold and Mike Cruz faced The Dark City Fight Club (Jon Davis and Kory Chavis), Francisco Ciatso, Simon Sez & The Afro Boy in a losing effort. In September 2016, Shaw debuted for Full Throttle Pro Wrestling. In his first match on September 17, 2016, Shaw defeated Shannon Moore. On June 23, 2018, Shaw defeated M.V.P. and Papadon to win the vacant FTPW Championship. He would lose the title on October 20, 2018, against Barrington Hughes in a match that also included Shannon Moore.

On March 18, 2017, at Tried N True/Global Force Wrestling The Art Of War II, Shaw defeated Crimson to become the inaugural TNT Champion. Shaw held the title 658 days until he lost it to Crazzy Steve at the NWA Pop-Up Event on January 5, 2019.

On October 21, 2018, at the National Wrestling Alliance's NWA 70th Anniversary Show, Shaw defeated Colt Cabana, Sammy Guevara and Scorpio Sky in a fatal four-way elimination to go on to a match for the vacant NWA National Championship later that night. However, he was defeated by Willie Mack in the finals. On December 9, Shaw was defeated in a championship rematch by Mack at Championship Wrestling From Hollywood.

=== WWE (2019–2022) ===
==== Beginnings (2019–2020) ====
On February 11, 2019, it was announced that Shaw had signed a contract with WWE and that he would report to the WWE Performance Center. He made his debut at an NXT house show on March 16, losing to Fabian Aichner. After debuting under his real name, his ring name was changed to "Dexter Lumis" in June. In the same month, it was announced that Lumis would compete in a tournament named the NXT Breakout Tournament. On the July 17 episode of NXT, Lumis lost in the first round of the tournament to Bronson Reed. On the March 25, 2020 episode of NXT, a vignette aired promoting Lumis' return. The following week, he defeated Jake Atlas. On the April 22 episode of NXT, he assisted Velveteen Dream in defeating The Undisputed Era in a tag team match after Dream's partner, Keith Lee, was taken out by Damian Priest, establishing himself as a face. On the May 6 episode of NXT, Lumis once again attempted to assist Dream in his NXT Championship match against Adam Cole, but accidentally knocked out the referee, thus costing Dream the match and the title.

On the June 3 episode of NXT, Lumis debuted a new artist element of his gimmick as he brought out an art easel and drew a sketch depicting himself driving a car with the Undisputed Era trapped in the rear deck. This led to the "Tortured Artist" becoming a nickname for Lumis. At TakeOver: In Your House, Lumis would interfere in the Backlot Brawl match between Cole and Dream as he attacked Roderick Strong and Bobby Fish, throwing them in the rear deck of a car and driving off with them. On the June 10 episode of NXT, Lumis lost to Cole in a non-title match after a distraction by Strong and Fish. After the match, Lumis attacked Strong and chased him to the back. On the July 1 episode of NXT: Great American Bash, Lumis defeated Strong in a strap match. On the July 29 episode of NXT, Lumis defeated Timothy Thatcher and Finn Bálor to qualify for a NXT North American Championship opportunity at NXT TakeOver XXX. However, he sustained an ankle injury, removing him from the match.

Lumis made his TV return on the September 30 episode of NXT, appearing in a backstage segment with Cameron Grimes. He defeated Austin Theory in the following week but was attacked by Grimes after the match. On the October 14 episode of NXT, Lumis challenged Damian Priest for the NXT North American Championship but lost after Grimes came out and stomped him on the apron while the referee was checking on Priest. Lumis went on to defeat Grimes in a Haunted House of Terror match at NXT: Halloween Havoc. On the November 11 episode of NXT, Lumis faced Timothy Thatcher in a match after the latter threw August Grey into a caricature that was painted by Lumis backstage. Lumis would lose that match after Grimes interfered again with a distraction. Grimes subsequently wrapped Lumis's head in a burlap sack and attacked him. The following week, they faced off in a blindfold match which ended in an apparent no contest after Grimes unknowingly knocked the referee unconscious and eventually ran off. Lumis then defeated Grimes in a strap match on December 6 at NXT TakeOver: WarGames.

==== The Way (2021–2022) ====
On January 6, 2021, Lumis hosted NXT: New Year's Evil. On the following week's NXT, he lost to Johnny Gargano in a non-title match after interference from Austin Theory. During NXT TakeOver: Vengeance Day, Lumis abducted Theory from The Way before Gargano's North American title match. On the February 24 episode of NXT, Lumis defeated Gargano in a non-title bout where Theory hesitated to hit him with a chair, and Indi Hartwell starts to develop an attraction towards him. On April 7, during Night 1 of NXT TakeOver: Stand & Deliver, he took part in a six-man Gauntlet Eliminator match where the winner gets to challenge for the North American Championship on Night 2, but was eliminated second by L. A. Knight. On the following week's NXT, Lumis teamed with Bronson Reed and the NXT Women's Tag Team Champions Shotzi Blackheart and Ember Moon in an eight-person mixed tag team match against The Way, where he carried a falsely unconscious Hartwell away from the ring.

On August 17, 2021, Indi Hartwell proposed to Lumis after the pair won a match on NXT, and Lumis accepted. Lumis and Hartwell had their wedding on the September 14 edition of NXT. During the ceremony Lumis choked out the priest allowing a recently ordained Beth Phoenix to take over. Lumis also spoke his very first words in WWE by saying "I do". On the December 7 episode on NXT, The Way disbanded after Johnny Gargano opted to leave when his contract expired. On April 29, 2022, Lumis was released from his WWE contract.

=== Return to the independent circuit (2022) ===
Shaw made his first appearance since leaving WWE on June 11, 2022, at the National Wrestling Alliance pay-per-view Alwayz Ready. He competed in a fatal four-way match for the vacant NWA Worlds Heavyweight Championship against Trevor Murdoch, Nick Aldis, and Thom Latimer; the bout was won by Murdoch. Two days later he defeated Mercurio on an episode of NWA USA.

On June 26, 2022, Shaw appeared with USA Pro Wrestling, defeating Ryzin at the "USA Pro Wrestle War 2022" event. On July 23, 2022, he appeared with MCW Pro Wrestling at the 21st Shane Shamrock Memorial Cup; substituting for Pat Brink, he teamed with Alec Odin to unsuccessfully challenge the Trade (Eric Martin and Robert Locke) for the MCW Tag Team Championship.

=== Return to WWE (2022–2026) ===
==== Main roster debut (2022–2023) ====
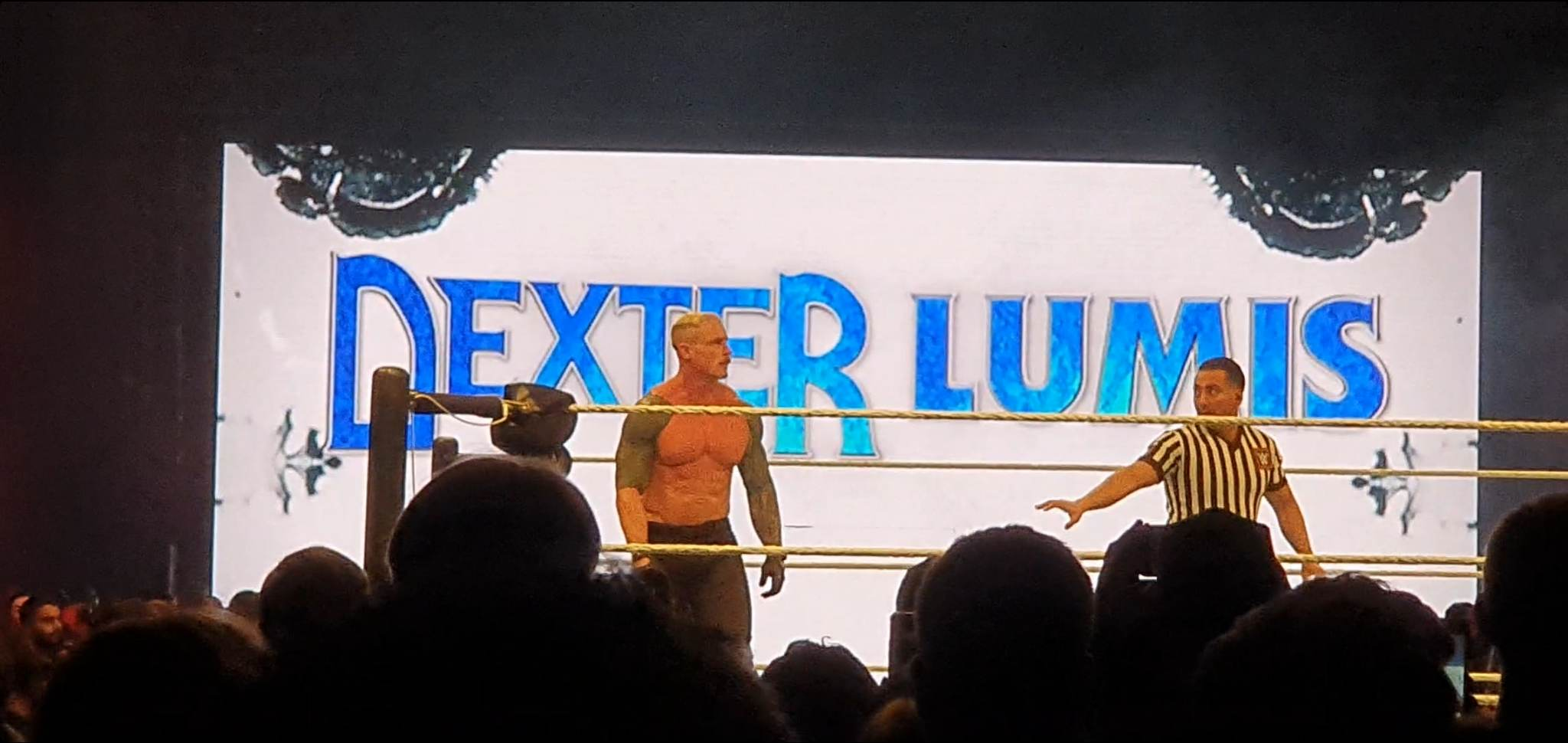
Lumis in 2023

On the August 8, 2022 episode of Raw, Shaw, reprising his Dexter Lumis character, made his unannounced return to the company; he was shown in the crowd being taken away by security while AJ Styles celebrated his victory against The Miz as the show ended. The following week, Lumis appeared during Styles' match against Bobby Lashley. He climbed the barricade while The Miz attacked Styles, but was quickly escorted out by security. On the August 22 episode of Raw, Lumis appeared in the crowd and abducted The Miz during a tag team match involving Styles, Lashley and Ciampa. The following night on NXT, Lumis reunited with his (kayfabe) wife Indi Hartwell in an in-ring segment; the two kissed and Lumis carried Hartwell backstage. He handed her a drawing that read "Goodbye, Indi (for now). I love you" before being arrested by police. On the September 5 episode of Raw, Lumis distracted Miz during a steel cage match against Lashley for the United States Championship, costing Miz the match and title. Lumis entered the ring after the match and choked him out. He continued to torment Miz over the next few weeks, including stalking him at his home and attacking him backstage.

On the October 17 episode of Raw, Lumis was attacked by Miz before their match which then did not take place. On the October 31 episode of Raw, Johnny Gargano was interviewed backstage and showed footage of a conversation between The Miz and Lumis where, Miz paid Lumis to stage attacks on him, and now Lumis was coming to get the money that is owed to him. On the November 29 episode of Raw, Lumis defeated Miz in an Anything Goes match, earning himself a WWE contract and the money Miz owed him. On the December 19 episode of Raw, Lumis put his money on the line against Miz in a ladder match, which he lost after interference from the returning Bronson Reed, ending their feud.

Lumis appeared at NXT Stand & Deliver in April 2023, assisting Hartwell in her ladder match to win the NXT Women's Championship. He again appeared on the May 2 NXT show in a segment with Hartwell.

==== The Wyatt Sicks (2024–2026) ====
On the June 17, 2024 episode of Raw, after over a year since last appearing on television, Lumis made his return as a part of a new stable under the leadership of Uncle Howdy called The Wyatt Sicks. Lumis would sport a buzzard mask, resembling Mercy the Buzzard from Bray Wyatt's "Firefly Funhouse". On the July 29, 2024 episode of Raw, Lumis along the Wyatt Sicks stable unmasked themselves, sporting a new look with long beard and long dreaded hair. On the August 5 episode of Raw, Lumis teamed with stablemates Joe Gacy and Erick Rowan to defeat the newly formed team "American Made" (Chad Gable and the Creed Brothers). On the September 9 episode of Raw, the Wyatt Sicks defeated American Made in a Street Fight, ending their feud.

The Wyatt Sicks' next feud was against The Miz and The Final Testament, facing each other on the December 9 episode of Raw, where the Wyatt Sicks suffered their first loss as a stable in an eight-man tag team match. The stable was drafted to the SmackDown brand, but didn't appear on television due to an injury to Uncle Howdy. The stable returned to television on the May 23 episode of SmackDown, attacking The Street Profits, Fraxiom and DIY. On the July 11 episode of SmackDown, Lumis and Gacy defeated The Street Profits to win the WWE Tag Team Championship, marking Lumis' first championship in WWE. On night two of SummerSlam on August 3, Lumis and Gacy defended the titles in a six-pack tables, ladders, and chairs match against the Street Profits, DIY, Fraxiom, the Motor City Machine Guns, and Andrade and Rey Fénix, where they retained. On the January 23, 2026 episode of SmackDown, Lumis and Gacy lost the WWE Tag Team Championship to Solo Sikoa and Tama Tonga of The MFT. In what would be his final match with the WWE on the April 17 episode of SmackDown, Lumis lost the eight man street fight tag team match to the MFTs. The following week on April 24, Shaw was released from his contract alongside the other members of the Wyatt Sicks, effectively ending his second stint and three year tenure with the company.

=== Second return to the independent circuit (2026–present) ===
Shaw made his return to the independent scene on July 25, 2026 for Atomic Legacy Wrestling (ALW)'s event Star Spangled Slammer, where he teamed with Joseph Sawyer (formerly Joe Gacy in WWE) to defeat Martin Stone and Ripper Zbyszko to become the number one contenders for the ALW Tag Team Championship.

=== Return to TNA (2026–present) ===
On the September 24, 2026, episode of Thursday Night Impact!, Shaw returned to TNA alongside the debuting Joseph Sawyer as syX, attacking The Hardys (Jeff Hardy and Matt Hardy) and revealing themselves as the perpetrators behind the mysterious attacks in the previous weeks. On October 11, at Bound for Glory, syX defeated the Hardys in a Falls count anywhere with the assistance of Erick Redbeard.

== Acting career ==
Shaw had a guest role as Dex, in an August 2023 episode of the TruTV comedy series Tacoma FD.

== Filmography ==
=== Television ===
Year	Title	Role	Notes
2023	Tacoma FD	Dex	Episode: "Who Gives A-Shift?"

=== Video games ===
Year	Title
2022	WWE 2K22 (video game debut)
2023	WWE 2K23
2024	WWE 2K24
2025	WWE 2K25
2026	WWE 2K26

== Championships and accomplishments ==
- Destiny World Wrestling
  - Destiny World Championship (1 time, current)
- Full Throttle Pro Wrestling
  - FTPW Championship (1 time)
- Ohio Valley Wrestling
  - OVW Southern Tag Team Championship (2 times) – with Alex Silva
- Pro Wrestling Illustrated
  - Ranked No. 142 of the top 500 singles wrestlers in the PWI 500 in 2021
- Relentless Wrestling
  - Relentless Heavyweight Championship (1 time, current)
- Total Nonstop Action Wrestling
  - TNA Gut Check winner (2012)
- Tried-N-True Pro
  - TNT Championship (1 time, inaugural)
  - TNT Championship Tournament (2017)
- United States Wrestling Alliance
  - USWA Championship (1 time)
- Vintage Wrestling
  - Vintage Heavyweight Championship (3 times)
- Wrestling Observer Newsletter
  - Worst Feud of the Year (2022) vs. The Miz
- WWE
  - WWE Tag Team Championship (1 time) – with Joe Gacy
  - Slammy Award (1 Time)
    - WTF Moment of the Year (2025) Wyatt Sicks debut on RAW with Bo Dallas, Erick Rowan, Joe Gacy and Nikki Cross
