= TLC: Tables, Ladders & Chairs (2016) =

WWE pay-per-view and livestreaming event

- Promotional poster featuring AJ Styles
- Promotion: WWE
- Brand: SmackDown
- Date: December 4, 2016
- City: Dallas, Texas
- Venue: American Airlines Center
- Attendance: 12,500

WWE event chronology
← Previous; Survivor Series	Next → Roadblock: End of the Line

TLC: Tables, Ladders & Chairs chronology
← Previous; 2015	Next → 2017

The 2016 TLC: Tables, Ladders & Chairs was a professional wrestling pay-per-view (PPV) and livestreaming event produced by WWE, held exclusively for wrestlers from the promotion's main roster brand, SmackDown. It was the eighth annual TLC: Tables, Ladders & Chairs and took place on December 4, 2016, at the American Airlines Center in Dallas, Texas. The concept of the show was based around the primary matches of the card each utilizing tables, ladders, and chairs as legal weapons.

Seven matches were contested at the event, including one on the Kickoff pre-show. In the main event, AJ Styles defeated Dean Ambrose in a Tables, Ladders, and Chairs match to retain the WWE World Championship; shortly after the event, the title's name was truncated to WWE Championship. SmackDown's other three championships were also defended: The Wyatt Family (Bray Wyatt and Randy Orton) defeated Heath Slater and Rhyno to win the SmackDown Tag Team Championship, Alexa Bliss defeated Becky Lynch in a tables match to win the SmackDown Women's Championship, and The Miz retained the Intercontinental Championship against Dolph Ziggler in a ladder match.

This was the first TLC event held since the reintroduction of the brand extension in July. This was also the first to be brand-exclusive for either brand split period. The first two events in 2009 and 2010 had featured wrestlers from both Raw and SmackDown as brand-exclusive PPV events during the first brand split were discontinued in April 2007, and then the first brand split ended in August 2011.

== Production ==
=== Background ===
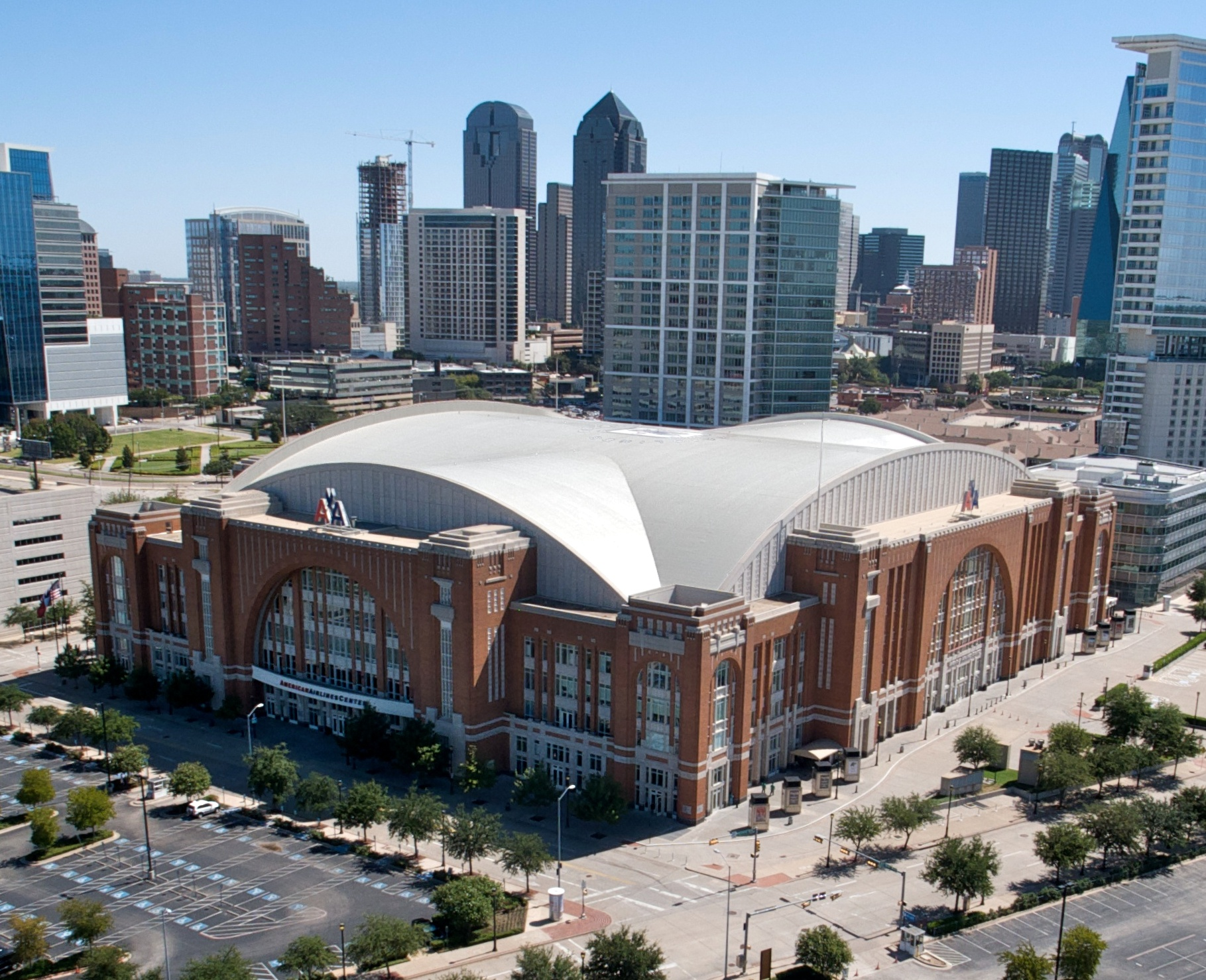
The eighth annual TLC: Tables, Ladders & Chairs was held at the American Airlines Center in Dallas, Texas.

TLC: Tables, Ladders & Chairs was an annual professional wrestling event produced every December by WWE since 2009. It was originally broadcast exclusively via pay-per-view (PPV) before it began simultaneously livestreaming on the WWE Network in 2014. The concept of the event was based on the primary matches of the card each containing a stipulation using tables, ladders, and chairs as legal weapons, with the main event generally being a Tables, Ladders, and Chairs match.

Announced on August 30, 2016, the eighth TLC event was scheduled to be held on December 4, 2016, at the American Airlines Center in Dallas, Texas. Tickets went on sale on October 1 via Ticketmaster. Following the reintroduction of the brand extension in July, where WWE again split its main roster into two brands, Raw and SmackDown, where wrestlers were exclusively assigned to perform, brand-exclusive PPV events were also reinstated, which had been discontinued during the first brand split after WrestleMania 23 in April 2007. As a result, the 2016 TLC event was held exclusively for SmackDown, which made it the first brand-exclusive TLC event, as the first two events in 2009 and 2010 featured wrestlers from both brands before the original brand extension ended in August 2011.

=== Storylines ===
The event comprised seven matches, including one on the Kickoff pre-show, that resulted from scripted storylines. Results were predetermined by WWE's writers on the SmackDown brand, while storylines were produced on WWE's weekly television show, SmackDown Live.

At No Mercy, AJ Styles defeated both Dean Ambrose and John Cena to retain the WWE World Championship. On the October 25 episode of SmackDown, Ambrose fought Styles to become the number one contender for the title, but James Ellsworth attacked Styles, causing Ambrose to be disqualified. A rematch took place on the November 1 episode and Ambrose successfully defeated Styles, earning a title match at TLC, for which Commissioner Shane McMahon scheduled it as a Tables, Ladders, and Chairs match. At Survivor Series, Ambrose and Styles, both part of Team SmackDown, got into a heated argument during their Survivor Series elimination match against Team Raw. Ambrose attacked Styles, but was surprised by Braun Strowman, who scored a pinfall after a running powerslam; Styles did not attempt to break the pin. Later in the match, Ambrose returned to the ring to attack Styles and helped his former Shield partners Seth Rollins and Roman Reigns to perform a triple powerbomb on Styles through a broadcast table, which enabled Rollins to eliminate Styles. On the following SmackDown, Ambrose was given the night off for his actions and Ellsworth was granted a SmackDown contract. AJ Styles criticized this decision, arguing that Ellsworth should earn his contract in a ladder match. Ellsworth accepted the challenge, with both his new contract and a future opportunity at the WWE World Championship on the line. Dean Ambrose, who had been repeatedly sent out of the arena, returned during the match and helped Ellsworth defeat Styles. On the November 29 episode of SmackDown, Ambrose hosted his Ambrose Asylum with Ellsworth as the guest. Styles interrupted and attacked both, resulting in Ellsworth being taken away on a stretcher. Later, Ambrose attacked Styles backstage as the show ended.

On the November 15 episode of SmackDown, The Miz, with help from Maryse, defeated Dolph Ziggler for the Intercontinental Championship and then retained the championship at Survivor Series against Raw's Sami Zayn; this was an open challenge originally made by Ziggler before he lost the title to Miz. On the November 22 episode of SmackDown, following a controversial win over Kalisto, Miz was surprised by Ziggler, who hit him with a superkick. Later, General Manager Daniel Bryan scheduled The Miz to defend his championship against Ziggler at TLC in a ladder match.

On the August 2 episode of SmackDown, Kalisto was injured by Baron Corbin. Kalisto returned on the November 8 episode and was scheduled to face Corbin, but before the match could begin, Kalisto injured Corbin's knee, preventing Corbin from competing at Survivor Series. At that event, Kalisto was granted an opportunity for Raw's WWE Cruiserweight Championship; if Kalisto won, the cruiserweight division would transfer to SmackDown. However, Corbin interfered in the match, costing Kalisto the title and SmackDown the division. On the following SmackDown, Kalisto received an Intercontinental Championship match against The Miz, but lost due to distraction by Corbin, who then executed End of Days on Kalisto. For interfering in both of Kalisto's championship matches and also costing SmackDown the cruiserweight division, he was scheduled to face Kane. During the match, Kalisto attacked Corbin. Afterwards on Talking Smack, a chairs match between the two was scheduled for TLC.

SmackDown Women's Champion Becky Lynch was originally scheduled to defend the title against Alexa Bliss at No Mercy, but due to a legitimate out-of-ring injury, she was unable to compete and the match was rescheduled for the November 8 episode of SmackDown. Lynch won the match by submission, despite Bliss placing her foot on the rope. On the November 22 episode of SmackDown, Bliss demanded a rematch, to which Lynch agreed for TLC. Later that night, Bliss attacked Lynch, who had just defeated Natalya. The following week during the contract signing, Lynch attacked Bliss but was eventually put through a table herself. At Bliss's request, their match was made a tables match.

On the November 22 episode of SmackDown, American Alpha (Chad Gable and Jason Jordan) became the number one contenders for the SmackDown Tag Team Championship by defeating The Hype Bros (Zack Ryder and Mojo Rawley), The Ascension (Konnor and Viktor), Breezango (Tyler Breeze and Fandango), The Usos (Jey Uso and Jimmy Uso), and The Vaudevillains (Aiden English and Simon Gotch) in a Tag Team Turmoil match. However, Bray Wyatt and Randy Orton (of The Wyatt Family), who had won the Survivor Series match for SmackDown's men's team, immediately challenged American Alpha to a match for the number one contender's spot the following week. On the November 29 episode, Wyatt and Orton defeated American Alpha to become the number one contenders.

At SummerSlam, Nikki Bella returned from injury and joined Natalya and Alexa Bliss to replace the suspended Eva Marie against Becky Lynch, Carmella, and Naomi. Nikki won the match for her team by pinning Carmella. Carmella then attacked Nikki on the following SmackDown and the aftershow Talking Smack, beginning a long, heated rivalry between the two. At Survivor Series, Nikki was the captain for Team SmackDown, which included Carmella, for the women's Survivor Series elimination match, but was kept out of the match when someone attacked her backstage. On the November 22 episode of SmackDown, Nikki accused Carmella of being the attacker, which Carmella denied. Nikki added that regardless of who attacked her, she would settle her differences with Carmella at TLC in a no disqualification match.

== Event ==
Other on-screen personnel
Role:	Name:
English commentators	Mauro Ranallo
English commentators	John "Bradshaw" Layfield
English commentators	David Otunga
English commentators	Tom Phillips
Spanish commentators	Carlos Cabrera
Spanish commentators	Marcelo Rodríguez
German commentators	Holger Böschen
German commentators	Manu Thiele
Ring announcer	Greg Hamilton
Referees	Dan Engler
Referees	Jason Ayers
Referees	Mike Chioda
Referees	Ryan Tran
Backstage interviewers	Renee Young
Backstage interviewers	Dasha Fuentes
Pre-show panel	Renee Young
Pre-show panel	Booker T
Pre-show panel	Peter Rosenberg
Pre-show panel	Daniel Bryan
Talking Smack panel	Renee Young
Talking Smack panel	Daniel Bryan

=== Pre-show ===
During the TLC: Tables, Ladders & Chairs Kickoff pre-show, Apollo Crews, The Hype Bros (Mojo Rawley and Zack Ryder), and American Alpha (Chad Gable and Jason Jordan) faced Curt Hawkins, The Ascension (Konnor and Viktor), and The Vaudevillains (Simon Gotch and Aiden English). Jordan won the match for his team by pinning Gotch after performing "Grand Amplitude".

=== Preliminary matches ===
The actual pay-per-view event opened with Heath Slater and Rhyno defending the SmackDown Tag Team Championship against The Wyatt Family (Bray Wyatt and Randy Orton). In the end, Rhyno attempted a "Gore" on Orton outside the ring, but Luke Harper pushed Orton, resulting in Harper receiving the "Gore" from Rhyno. Rhyno returned to the ring to face Wyatt, who he believed was the legal man. Orton, however, surprised Rhyno with an "RKO" to win the titles.

Next, Nikki Bella faced Carmella in a No Disqualification match. The match ended when Nikki sprayed Carmella with a fire extinguisher and performed a "Rack Attack 2.0" for the win. After the match, Carmella alleged that Natalya was the one that attacked Nikki at Survivor Series.

After that, The Miz defended the Intercontinental Championship against Dolph Ziggler in a Ladder match. During the match, Miz targeted Ziggler's leg. Miz applied a Figure Four Leglock on Ziggler, whose leg was trapped in a ladder. Miz then performed a Skull-Crushing Finale to Ziggler onto a ladder. As Ziggler climbed the ladder, Miz performed a Slingshot Powerbomb on Ziggler onto a ladder wedged in the corner. In the end, as Ziggler tried to retrieve the title belt, Miz attacked Ziggler with two low blows and retrieved the belt to retain the title.

In the fourth match, Baron Corbin faced Kalisto in a Chairs match. Corbin executed the "End of Days" on Kalisto onto a pile of chairs to win the match.

Next, Becky Lynch defended the SmackDown Women's Championship against Alexa Bliss in a Tables match. The match ended when Lynch and Bliss fought on the ring apron above a table. After Bliss was pushed down to the floor, Bliss performed a Powerbomb on Lynch through the table to win the title.

=== Main event ===
In the main event, AJ Styles defended the WWE World Championship against Dean Ambrose in a Tables, Ladders, and Chairs match. During the match, Styles attempted a suplex through four chairs on Ambrose but Ambrose countered with a rolling release suplex through the chairs. Ambrose then set up a ladder on a broadcast table, from which he performed a diving elbow drop onto Styles through another broadcast table. Ambrose climbed the ladder to retrieve the title belt but Styles stopped him and then performed a Springboard "450 Splash" on Ambrose through a table set up outside the ring. Styles climbed the ladder but James Ellsworth appeared and distracted Styles. As Styles attacked Ellsworth, Ambrose stopped him and performed "Dirty Deeds" onto the ring steps. As Ambrose climbed the ladder to retrieve the belt, Ellsworth pushed the ladder, causing Ambrose to fall through tables set up outside the ring. Styles retrieved the title belt to retain the championship.

== Aftermath ==
On Talking Smack immediately following TLC, James Ellsworth explained to an angry Daniel Bryan that he had interfered because he wanted to defeat AJ Styles, whom he had already beaten three times, for the WWE World Championship, and Shane McMahon granted him the match for the following SmackDown. He also stated he would immediately give Dean Ambrose another title opportunity. However, Ellsworth's opportunity for the title, now renamed WWE Championship, was twice postponed; on the following SmackDown, Styles was still ailing from injuries sustained at TLC. Ellsworth interrupted Styles, but was attacked by Ambrose with Dirty Deeds. On the following episode, Ellsworth was suffering from a cold. The match eventually happened on the December 20 episode; Styles easily defeated Ellsworth in under a minute.

Also on Talking Smack after TLC, Baron Corbin demanded a spot in the main event and a chance at the world championship. Before that, he defeated Kalisto in a rematch. On the December 20 episode, he confronted Dolph Ziggler, who had earned a WWE Championship match the week prior. Corbin called Ziggler undeserving of a title shot and a match between the two with Ziggler's title shot on the line was scheduled, but it ended in a double count-out, after which, AJ Styles attacked both Ziggler and Corbin with a chair. Daniel Bryan then scheduled a triple threat for the WWE Championship between the three for the following episode. Styles won that match and reignited his rivalry with the returning John Cena, who demanded a title match at the Royal Rumble.

Dean Ambrose was a guest at Miz TV. Miz first celebrated his win over Dolph Ziggler and said that their rivalry was finally at an end. Ambrose explained that he was not angry with James Ellsworth, just surprised, especially for all that he had done for him, including helping him get a SmackDown contract. Miz blamed the situation on Ambrose and insulted him by handing him a participation award, beginning a rivalry between the two, where Ambrose defeated Miz for the Intercontinental Championship on the January 3, 2017, episode.

For the next couple of weeks, Carmella repeated her accusation against Natalya, who allegedly had acted out of jealousy, but Natalya denied it until the December 20 episode, when she admitted to being the attacker because of pent up jealousy of the Bella Twins. Alexa Bliss, using heel tactics, retained the SmackDown Women's Championship against Becky Lynch in a rematch. She then lost a non-title match against "newcomer" La Luchadora, who made the champion submit to the Dis-arm-her and then unmasked as Lynch. Over the next few weeks, an unknown female dressed as La Luchadora began to aid Bliss in matches against Lynch, including Bliss's successful title defense in a Steel Cage match in the main event of the January 17 episode, where La Luchadora was unmasked as the returning Mickie James.

After failing to win back the SmackDown Tag Team Championship on the following SmackDown, Heath Slater and Rhyno discussed their future on Talking Smack. Rhyno criticized Slater's lack of contribution in their matches before walking off; despite this, they continued as a team. The Wyatt Family invoked the Freebird Rule, allowing Luke Harper to also defend the championship. The Hype Bros then won a battle royal to become the number one contenders, but after the match, it was discovered that Zack Ryder had injured his knee and required surgery. Subsequently, on the December 27 episode, The Wyatt Family lost the titles to American Alpha (Chad Gable and Jason Jordan) in a four-way tag team elimination match. The Wyatt Family invoked their rematch clause for the January 10, 2017, episode, but were unsuccessful.

While the 2016 TLC event was held as a SmackDown-branded show, the 2017 event was held exclusively for wrestlers from the Raw brand. Additionally, the 2017 event was moved up to October instead of the usual December scheduling.

== Results ==
No.	Results	Stipulations	Times
1^{P}	Apollo Crews, American Alpha (Chad Gable and Jason Jordan), and The Hype Bros (Mojo Rawley and Zack Ryder) defeated Curt Hawkins, The Vaudevillains (Aiden English and Simon Gotch), and The Ascension (Konnor and Viktor) by pinfall	Ten-man tag team match	11:55
2	The Wyatt Family (Bray Wyatt and Randy Orton) (with Luke Harper) defeated Heath Slater and Rhyno (c) by pinfall	Tag team match for the WWE SmackDown Tag Team Championship	5:55
3	Nikki Bella defeated Carmella by pinfall	No Disqualification match	8:00
4	The Miz (c) (with Maryse) defeated Dolph Ziggler	Ladder match for the WWE Intercontinental Championship	25:00
5	Baron Corbin defeated Kalisto by pinfall	Chairs match	13:00
6	Alexa Bliss defeated Becky Lynch (c)	Tables match for the WWE SmackDown Women's Championship	15:10
7	AJ Styles (c) defeated Dean Ambrose	Tables, Ladders, and Chairs match for the WWE World Championship	30:50
(c) / – the champion(s) heading into the match; P / – the match was broadcast on the pre-show
