= Backlash (2016) =

WWE pay-per-view and livestreaming event

- Promotional poster featuring Dean Ambrose
- Promotion: WWE
- Brand: SmackDown
- Date: September 11, 2016
- City: Richmond, Virginia
- Venue: Richmond Coliseum
- Attendance: 7,000

WWE event chronology
← Previous; SummerSlam	Next → Cruiserweight Classic Finale

Backlash chronology
← Previous; 2009	Next → 2017

The 2016 Backlash was a professional wrestling pay-per-view (PPV) and livestreaming event produced by WWE, held exclusively for wrestlers from the promotion's main roster brand, SmackDown. It was the 12th Backlash and took place on September 11, 2016, at the Richmond Coliseum in Richmond, Virginia. This was the first Backlash held since the 2009 event, subsequently making it the first to livestream on the WWE Network that launched in 2014, and it was the only Backlash to be held in September.

Following the reintroduction of the brand extension in July 2016, Backlash was the first brand-exclusive PPV and livestreaming event of the second brand split and was the first brand-exclusive PPV event since the 2007 No Way Out. It was also the first brand-exclusive Backlash since 2006. The original concept of Backlash was based on the backlash of WrestleMania, however, the 2016 event dropped this theme as it was instead held after that year's SummerSlam—the post-WrestleMania theme would return with the 2021 event.

Eight matches were contested at the event, including one on the Kickoff pre-show. In the main event, AJ Styles defeated Dean Ambrose to win the WWE World Championship, making him the first wrestler since Kurt Angle to hold world championships in WWE, Total Nonstop Action Wrestling, and New Japan Pro-Wrestling. The event also determined the inaugural holders of the SmackDown Women's Championship and SmackDown Tag Team Championship, which were won by Becky Lynch and the team of Heath Slater and Rhyno, respectively.

Unlike a large majority of WWE's PPV and livestreaming events, the 2016 Backlash did not see a DVD or Blu-ray release.

== Production ==
=== Background ===
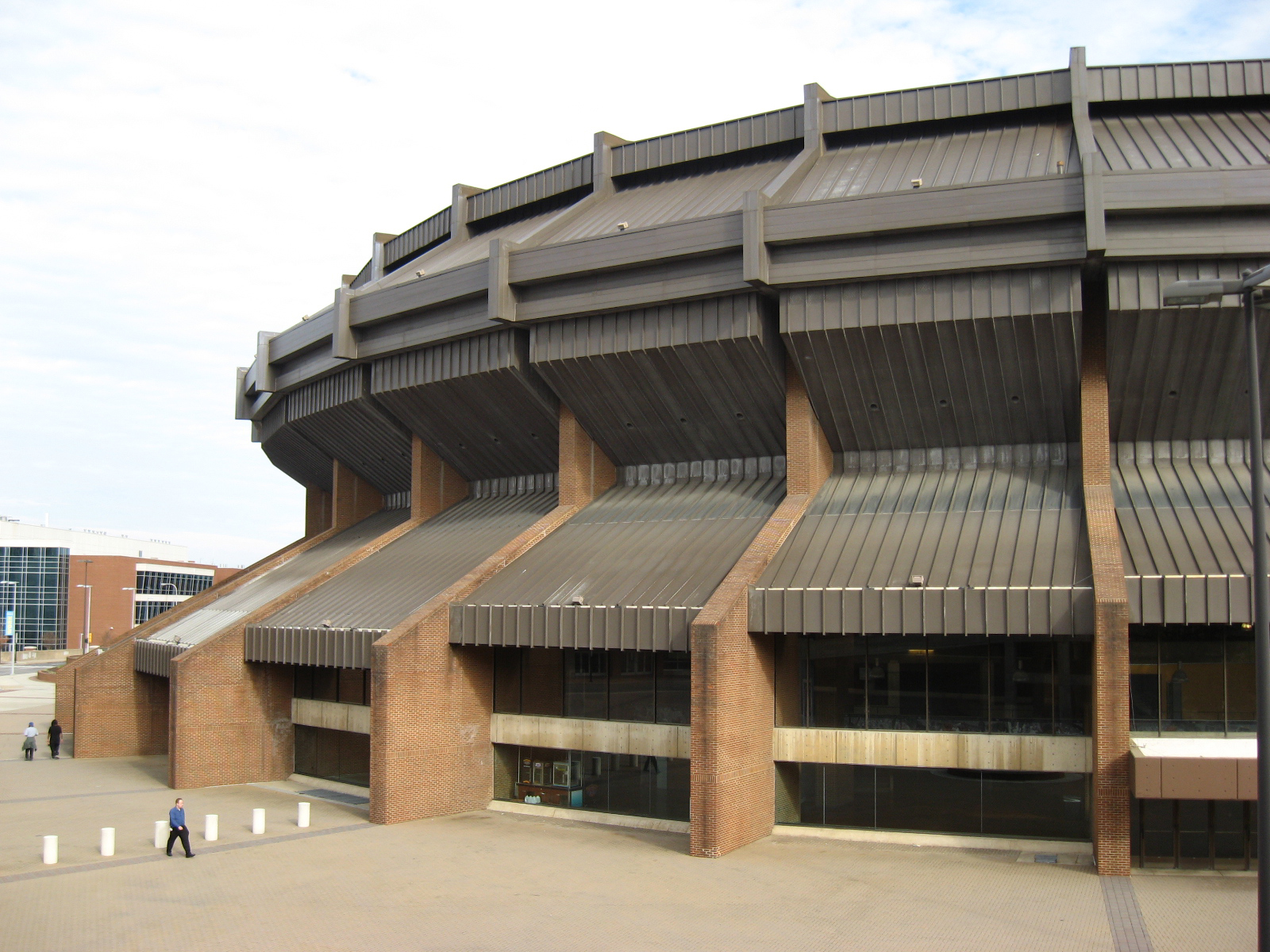
The 12th Backlash, which was the first held since 2009, took place at the Richmond Coliseum in Richmond, Virginia.

Backlash was a professional wrestling pay-per-view (PPV) event that was established by WWE in 1999 and held annually until 2009. The concept was originally based around the backlash from WWE's flagship event, WrestleMania. After its 2009 event, Backlash was discontinued and replaced by Extreme Rules. In August 2011, WWE ended the first brand extension, but in mid-2016, it was reinstated with the main roster again divided between the Raw and SmackDown brands where wrestlers were exclusively assigned to perform. WWE also brought back brand-exclusive PPV events (which they had previously done during the first brand split from 2003 to 2007), increasing the amount of PPV events per year. As such, Backlash was reinstated to be held exclusively for the SmackDown brand, which was the first brand-exclusive Backlash since 2006. As a result, it was WWE's first brand-exclusive PPV event of the second brand split. Tickets went on sale on July 30 through Ticketmaster.

The 12th Backlash was scheduled to be held on September 11, 2016, at the Richmond Coliseum in Richmond, Virginia, which ended its previous tradition of being the post-WrestleMania event. The event was instead held after SummerSlam that year, and was the first and only Backlash to be held in September. In addition to traditional PPV, this was the first Backlash to livestream on the WWE Network, which launched in February 2014. This was also the first Backlash held to be promoted under the company's shortened trade name of WWE, as following WrestleMania XXVII in April 2011, the company ceased using its full name of World Wrestling Entertainment, although that remains the legal name of the company.

=== Storylines ===
The event comprised eight matches, including one on the Kickoff pre-show, that resulted from scripted storylines. Results were predetermined by WWE's writers on the SmackDown brand, while storylines were produced on WWE's weekly television show, SmackDown Live.

At SummerSlam, Dean Ambrose retained the WWE World Championship against Dolph Ziggler, while AJ Styles defeated John Cena. On the following SmackDown, Styles taunted Ziggler about his loss, provoking him to attack Styles. Later, Styles was declared the no. 1 contender for the WWE World Championship at Backlash, which prompted Ziggler to come out to demand a shot at the title. Styles would defeat Ziggler in the main event of the August 23 episode of SmackDown, to prevent the title match from being turned into a triple threat match involving Ziggler.

Dueing the 2016 WWE Draft, WWE Women's Champion Charlotte was drafted to Raw, leaving SmackDown without a women's championship. On the August 23 episode of SmackDown, the WWE SmackDown Women's Championship was unveiled, and a six-pack elimination challenge between Alexa Bliss, Becky Lynch, Carmella, Naomi, Natalya, and Nikki Bella was slated for Backlash to crown the inaugural champion. Bella had returned from injury two nights before at SummerSlam, when she had joined Natalya and Alexa Bliss to replace the suspended Eva Marie in a winning effort against Becky Lynch, Carmella, and Naomi. Nikki was set to face Carmella following the unveiling of the title, whom she had pinned at SummerSlam. Instead, however, Carmella turned villainous by attacking Nikki during a pre-match interview and again during Talking Smack, SmackDown's aftershow.

Also during the 2016 Draft, WWE Tag Team Champions The New Day (Kofi Kingston, Big E, and Xavier Woods) were drafted to Raw, which also left the SmackDown brand without a tag team championship. On the August 23 episode of SmackDown, the WWE SmackDown Tag Team Championship was unveiled, and a tournament to crown the inaugural champions was then set up, with the tournament's final scheduled for Backlash. Originally scheduled to be a six-team tournament between American Alpha (Chad Gable and Jason Jordan), The Ascension (Konnor and Viktor), Breezango (Tyler Breeze and Fandango), The Hype Bros (Zack Ryder and Mojo Rawley), The Usos (Jey Uso and Jimmy Uso), and The Vaudevillains (Aiden English and Simon Gotch), Heath Slater, who was still trying to earn a SmackDown contract after being left out of the WWE Draft, was granted entry into the tournament on the condition that he found a partner and had to win the tournament to earn a contract. Rhyno, who had defeated Slater to win a contract weeks before, agreed to be his partner. In the quarter-finals, The Usos and American Alpha advanced with wins over The Ascension and Breezango, respectively. The following week, The Hype Bros, as well as Slater and Rhyno, would later advance with wins over The Vaudevillains and The Headbangers (Mosh and Thrasher) (who were added to the tournament), respectively. On the September 6 episode, American Alpha and the team of Slater and Rhyno advanced with wins over The Usos and The Hype Bros, respectively. However, The Usos would attack American Alpha after their match, causing Gable to suffer a leg injury. Due to this, American Alpha were ruled out of the tournament final, and a match between The Usos and The Hype Bros was then set for Backlash, with the winners replacing American Alpha in the final against Slater and Rhyno.

On the August 23 episode of SmackDown, Bray Wyatt confronted Randy Orton. The following week, Wyatt challenged Orton to a match at Backlash, which Orton accepted. On the September 6 episode, Wyatt stated that Orton had become weak following his showing at SummerSlam, and would be the one to initiate change in Orton. Orton would later respond to Wyatt, mocking his messages, prompting a match between the two to be commissioned for Backlash.

On the August 23 episode of SmackDown, Intercontinental Champion The Miz went on a tirade on general manager Daniel Bryan, in response to Bryan's comments about him wrestling "like a coward" and "someone who's afraid to get hit". On the following week's episode of SmackDown, Dolph Ziggler confronted The Miz, agreeing with Bryan to goad The Miz into a match for the Intercontinental Championship. After also insulting The Miz for being "a soft, safe coward", Bryan scheduled The Miz to defend his Intercontinental Championship against Ziggler at Backlash.

== Event ==
Other on-screen personnel
Role:	Name:
English commentators	Mauro Ranallo
English commentators	John "Bradshaw" Layfield
English commentators	David Otunga
Spanish commentators	Carlos Cabrera
Spanish commentators	Marcelo Rodríguez
German commentators	Sebastian Hackl
German commentators	Carsten Schaefer
Ring announcer	Greg Hamilton
Referees	Charles Robinson
Referees	Dan Engler
Referees	Jason Ayers
Referees	Mike Chioda
Interviewers	Renee Young
Interviewers	Charly Caruso
Pre-show panel	Renee Young
Pre-show panel	Booker T
Pre-show panel	Jerry Lawler
Pre-show panel	Lita

=== Pre-show ===
During the Backlash Kickoff pre-show, Baron Corbin faced Apollo Crews. The end came when Corbin executed the "End of Days" on Crews to win the match.

=== Preliminary matches ===
The pay-per-view's main card opened with the six-pack elimination challenge to determine the inaugural SmackDown Women's Champion involving Becky Lynch, Alexa Bliss, Carmella, Naomi, Natalya, and Nikki Bella. Bliss was eliminated by Naomi after a Diving Neckbreaker/Powerbomb combination with Natalya. Natalya then eliminated Naomi by forcing her to submit to the "Sharpshooter". Nikki eliminated Natalya after a "Rack Attack 2.0", but was immediately eliminated by Carmella with a roll-up. Lynch performed a series of Exploder suplexes on Carmella, who fired back with a Superkick. However, Lynch caught Carmella and forced her to submit to the "Dis-arm-her" to win the title.

Next, The Usos (Jey Uso and Jimmy Uso) faced The Hype Bros (Mojo Rawley and Zack Ryder) to qualify for the finals of the SmackDown Tag Team Championship tournament. In the end, Jimmy forced Ryder to submit to the "Tequila Sunrise" to win the match and qualify for the tournament final against Heath Slater and Rhyno.

After that, The Miz defended the Intercontinental Championship against Dolph Ziggler. During the match, Miz applied the "Figure Four Leglock", but Ziggler touched the rope. Ziggler executed a Superkick on Miz, who placed his foot on the rope at a two count. Whilst Miz distracted the referee, Maryse sprayed an unknown object at Ziggler, allowing Miz to execute a "Skull Crushing Finale" on Ziggler to retain the title.

Randy Orton was scheduled to face Bray Wyatt, but Wyatt had attacked him earlier in the event. Orton was then rendered unable to compete, and Wyatt was declared the winner via forfeit. Instead, Wyatt faced Kane in a No Holds Barred match, to substitute for Orton. During the match, Wyatt executed a Running Senton through a broadcast table on Kane. Kane executed a Chokeslam on Wyatt for a near-fall. In the end, Orton interfered and attacked Wyatt with an "RKO", leading to Kane executing a second Chokeslam on Wyatt to win the match.

Later, Heath Slater and Rhyno faced The Usos to determine the inaugural SmackDown Tag Team Champions. Rhyno executed a Gore on Jimmy whilst the referee was distracted, with Slater gaining the pinfall, to win the titles.

=== Main event ===
In the main event, Dean Ambrose defended the WWE World Championship against AJ Styles. During the match, Styles applied the "Calf Crusher" on Ambrose but Ambrose touched the ropes. Styles re-applied the "Calf Crusher", but Ambrose escaped. Styles executed a "Springboard 450 Splash" on Ambrose for a near-fall. Ambrose threw Styles over the barricade and dove onto him off a broadcast table. In the end, Ambrose attempted "Dirty Deeds", but Styles pushed Ambrose into Mike Chioda, the referee. Styles attacked Ambrose with a low blow and executed a "Styles Clash", to win the title.

== Aftermath ==
On the following episode of SmackDown, while AJ Styles was addressing the crowd of his title victory at the event, John Cena returned to challenge Styles to a match for the WWE World Championship, in an attempt to become a 16 time world champion. Dean Ambrose then appeared, demanding to have his rematch clause granted first. SmackDown commissioner Shane McMahon would then announce that Styles would defend his title against Cena and Ambrose in a triple threat match at No Mercy.

Having become one-half of the inaugural SmackDown Tag Team Champions at the event, Heath Slater was granted his SmackDown contract that was signed on the September 13 episode of SmackDown. This rendered him exclusive to the SmackDown brand, and was where Slater and Rhyno would be successful in their first titles defense against The Ascension (Konnor and Viktor). The Usos (Jey Uso and Jimmy Uso) would defeat American Alpha (Chad Gable and Jason Jordan) later on to earn a rematch against Slater and Rhyno for the titles at No Mercy.

Following his successful Intercontinental Championship defense against Dolph Ziggler, The Miz continued to berate general manager Daniel Bryan, and would vow not to defend his Intercontinental Championship on any show until he is granted a contract renegotiation. Bryan would later acquiesce to a contract renegotiation, while Ziggler would lose on back to back weeks against The Miz for the title. Ziggler would later put his career on the line for another chance at the title at No Mercy.

Alexa Bliss was later crowned the number one contender for the SmackDown Women's Championship after beating four other competitors on the following episode of SmackDown. The championship match was scheduled for No Mercy.

The Wrestling Observer Newsletter would report that Randy Orton was not cleared to wrestle at Backlash due to a concussion suffered from his main event match against Brock Lesnar that occurred the previous month at SummerSlam. On September 24, 2016, at a house show in Chicago, Illinois, Lesnar defeated Orton in a no disqualification rematch. Orton would later return to SmackDown in order to challenge Wyatt to a rematch at No Mercy, which Wyatt accepted.

== Results ==
No.	Results	Stipulations	Times
1^{P}	Baron Corbin defeated Apollo Crews by pinfall	Singles match	9:55
2	Becky Lynch defeated Alexa Bliss, Carmella, Naomi, Natalya, and Nikki Bella	Six-pack elimination challenge for the inaugural WWE SmackDown Women's Championship	14:40
3	The Usos (Jey Uso and Jimmy Uso) defeated The Hype Bros (Mojo Rawley and Zack Ryder) by submission	Second chance tag team challenge The winning team qualified for the tag team tournament final match for the inaugural WWE SmackDown Tag Team Championship later that night.	10:11
4	The Miz (c) (with Maryse) defeated Dolph Ziggler by pinfall	Singles match for the WWE Intercontinental Championship	18:22
5	Bray Wyatt defeated Randy Orton by forfeit	Singles match	00:25
6	Kane defeated Bray Wyatt by pinfall	No Holds Barred match	10:55
7	Heath Slater and Rhyno defeated The Usos (Jey Uso and Jimmy Uso) by pinfall	Tag team tournament final match for the inaugural WWE SmackDown Tag Team Championship	10:02
8	AJ Styles defeated Dean Ambrose (c) by pinfall	Singles match for the WWE World Championship	25:01
(c) / – the champion(s) heading into the match; P / – the match was broadcast on the pre-show

=== SmackDown Tag Team Championship tournament bracket ===
Quarterfinals; SmackDown; August 23–30, 2016
American Alpha (Chad Gable and Jason Jordan)	Pinfall
Breezango (Fandango and Tyler Breeze)	10:13
The Usos (Jey Uso and Jimmy Uso)	Pinfall
The Ascension (Konnor and Viktor)	3:49
The Hype Bros (Mojo Rawley and Zack Ryder)	Pinfall
The Vaudevillains (Aiden English and Simon Gotch)	2:50
The Headbangers (Mosh and Thrasher)	2:54
Heath Slater and Rhyno	Pinfall

Semifinals; SmackDown; September 6, 2016
American Alpha	Pinfall
The Usos	0:28
The Hype Bros	7:03
Heath Slater and Rhyno	Pinfall

Final; Backlash; September 11, 2016
The Usos (Note: When Chad Gable suffered an injury (kayfabe) after defeating The Usos, American Alpha were removed from the final. The Usos then defeated The Hype Bros at Backlash in a second chance tag team match to replace American Alpha in the final.)	10:02
Heath Slater and Rhyno	Pinfall

=== SmackDown Women's Championship match ===
Eliminated	Wrestler	Eliminated by	Method of elimination	Times
1	Alexa Bliss	Naomi	Pinned after a powerbomb/neckbreaker combination with Natalya	9:38
2	Naomi	Natalya	Submitted to the Sharpshooter	10:52
3	Natalya	Nikki Bella	Pinned after the Rack Attack 2.0	12:00
4	Nikki Bella	Carmella	Pinned with a roll-up	12:08
5	Carmella	Becky Lynch	Submitted to the Dis-arm-her	14:40
Winner	Becky Lynch	—N/a		14:40
