= Heath and Rhino =

Professional wrestling tag team

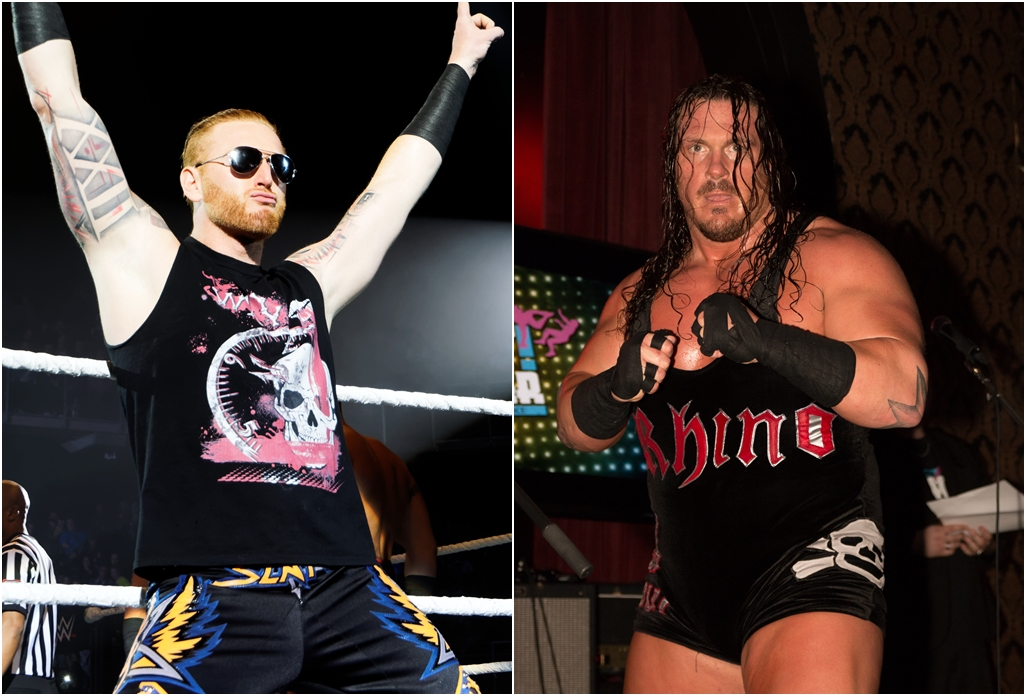
- Heath (left) and Rhino (right)

Tag team
- Members: Heath Slater/Heath; Rhyno/Rhino
- Name(s): Beauty and The Man Beast; Heath Slater and Rhyno; Heath and Rhyno; Heath and Rhino
- Billed heights: Heath: 6 ft 2 in (1.88 m); Rhino: 5 ft 10 in (1.78 m)
- Combined billed weight: 422 lb (191 kg)
- Debut: August 23, 2016
- Disbanded: October 27, 2023
- Years active: 2016–2019; 2020–2023

Heath and Rhino are an American professional wrestling tag team. As a team, they are best known for their time in WWE, where they originally formed and became the inaugural WWE SmackDown Tag Team Champions as Heath Slater and Rhyno and for their time in Impact Wrestling, where they are former one-time Impact World Tag Team Champions. The team also works on the independent circuit where they have won various tag team titles. In October 2023, the team returned to the independent circuit after Heath departed from Impact Wrestling.

== History ==
=== WWE (2016–2019) ===
After the 2016 Draft, WWE started a storyline where Heath Slater was a free agent since he wasn't assigned to Raw nor SmackDown. As part of the storyline, on the August 9 episode of SmackDown Live, the two wrestled each other with the stipulation that if Slater won, he would be signed to the SmackDown roster; however, Rhyno defeated Slater. On the August 23 episode of SmackDown, Slater was offered a spot in the tournament for the newly instated SmackDown Tag Team Championship if he found a partner. After struggling to find a partner, Rhyno approached Slater and agreed to be his partner for the tournament. Rhyno and Slater defeated The Headbangers in the first round and The Hype Bros in the semi-finals to advance to the finals at Backlash, where they defeated The Usos to become the inaugural champions, while also granting Slater a contract.

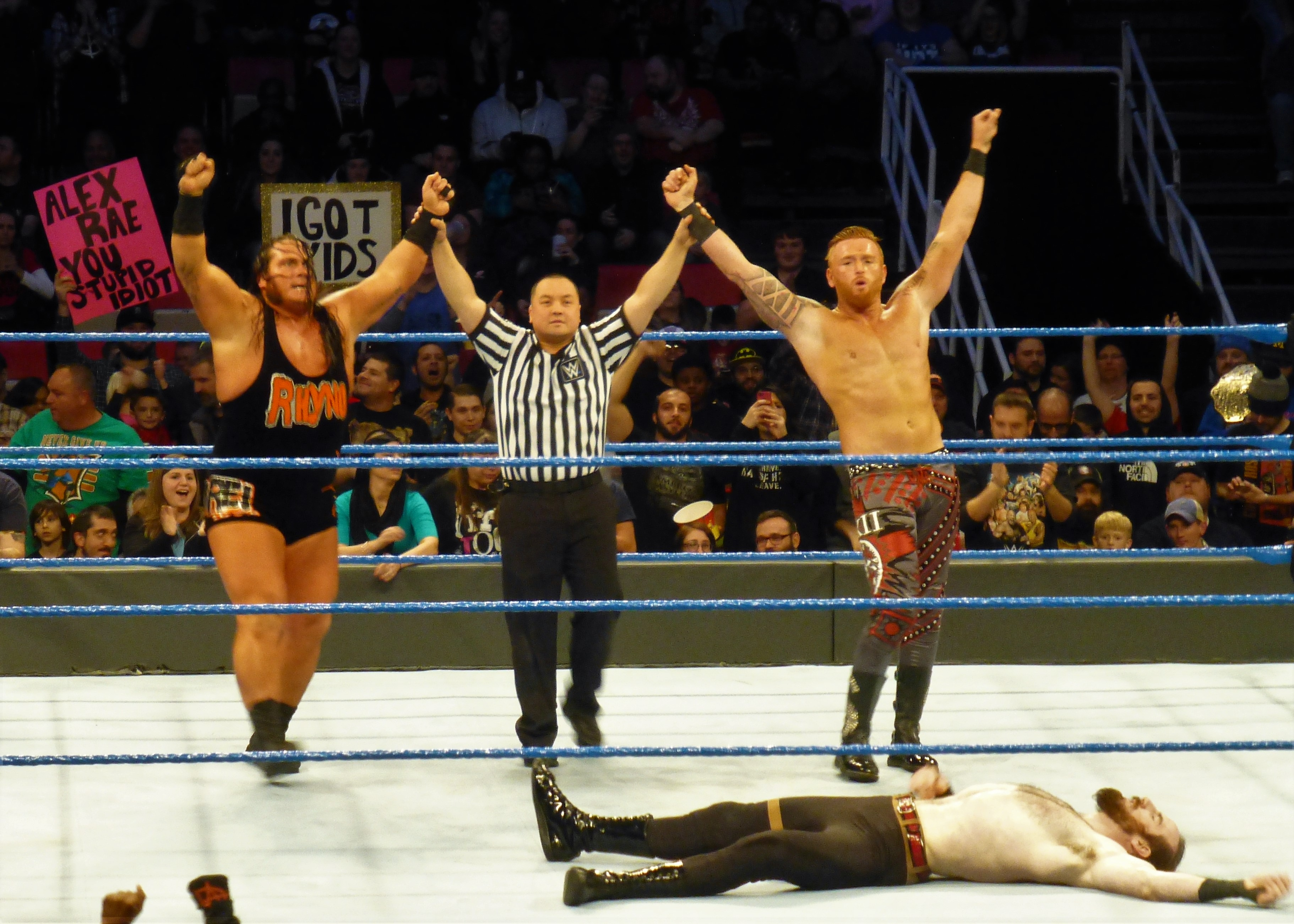
Heath Slater and Rhyno after defeating The Vaudevillains on Smackdown Live

On the September 13 episode of SmackDown Live, Rhyno and Slater defeated The Ascension to successfully retain the titles in their first defense following Slater's official live contract signing. At No Mercy, Rhyno and Slater retained the titles against The Usos. At Survivor Series, Rhyno and Slater were the team captains for Team SmackDown in the 10–on–10 Survivor Series Tag Team Elimination match, where they were defeated by Team Raw. At TLC on December 4, Rhyno and Slater's tag team championship reign came to an end at 84 days after they were defeated by The Wyatt Family (Bray Wyatt and Randy Orton). Two days later on SmackDown Live, Rhyno and Slater received their rematch, but failed to regain the titles. At Elimination Chamber on February 12, 2017, the duo were the first entrants into the tag team turmoil match for the titles, eliminating Breezango and The Vaudevillains before being eliminated by The Usos.

On April 10, both Rhyno and Slater were traded to Raw brand as part of the Superstar Shake-up. On the June 5 episode of Raw, Rhyno and Slater failed to win the Raw Tag Team Championship against Cesaro and Sheamus. On the October 30 episode of Raw, Rhyno and Slater defeated The Club in an All Hallow's Eve Trick or Street Fight. At the Royal Rumble on January 28, 2018, Rhyno participated in the Royal Rumble match as the third entrant, this was Rhyno's first appearance in 14 years at the namesake pay-per-view match but was eliminated by Baron Corbin.

On the December 3 episode of Raw, General Manager Baron Corbin created a match between Rhyno and Slater, where the loser would be fired from Raw. Rhyno lost the match and was subsequently forced to leave the brand. However, after Corbin was removed from power, he returned to Raw to aid Slater against an attack from Jinder Mahal on the December 24 episode of Raw. The following week on Raw, Rhyno and Slater faced Mahal and The Singh Brothers in a losing effort. On July 17, their team ended after Rhyno left WWE.

=== Impact Wrestling (2020–2023) ===
After Rhyno left WWE, he signed with Impact Wrestling and changed the spelling of his name to Rhino (as WWE owns the trademark with the "y" spelling). Slater was released from WWE in April 2020 due to budget cuts as a result of the COVID-19 pandemic. He then made his debut in Impact on July 18 at Slammiversary, now using the shortened name Heath. The duo then began a storyline where Heath did not have a contract with Impact and tried to obtain one, similar to the storyline in WWE that resulted in the two becoming a team in the first place. Their first match as a team with the promotion took place at Victory Road, where Heath and Rhino defeated Reno Scum (Adam Thornstowe and Luster the Legend).

On October 24 at Bound for Glory, both Heath and Rhino took part in an Intergender Call Your Shot Gauntlet match, where the winner could choose any championship match of their choice; however, if either Heath or Rhino won, Heath would earn a full-time contract with Impact Wrestling, but if they both lost, he would be fired. Rhino would go on to win, thus winning Heath an Impact contract; however, Heath suffered an injury during the match.

In March 2021, while Heath was injured, Rhino turned heel and joined Violent By Design (Eric Young, Deaner, and Joe Doering). In September, Rhino would be kicked out of VBD. On the September 30 episode of Impact, Heath would make his return after nearly a year, saving Rhino from a potential attack by VBD, and Heath then looked to give Rhino a hug afterwards, but Rhino would walk out of the ring. In the following weeks, Rhino was not sure which side to take, and Heath asks Impact EVP Scott D'Amore to make a match pitting him and anyone else against Violent By Design at Bound for Glory, which was accepted.

On October 23, 2021, at Bound for Glory, Rhino appeared as Heath's tag team partner, where they defeated VBD, thus turning Rhino into a face again.

On October 8, 2022, during the Impact! taping, Heath and Rhino defeated The Kingdom to become to the new Impact World Tag Team Champions. This aired via tape delay on October 20.

On October 27, 2023, Heath departed from Impact Wrestling, effectively disbanding the team.

=== Independent circuit (2020–present) ===
On October 10, 2020, at Xtreme Intense Championship Wrestling (XICW), Heath and Rhino defeated DBA and Jaimy Coxxx to become XICW Tag Team Champions. On February 17, 2022, at the 'St. Valentine's Day Mayhem' event for Insane Wrestling Revolution (IWR), the duo defeated Aaron Orion & Jack Price to become the inaugural IWR World Tag Team Champions.

== Championships and accomplishments ==
- Bluegrass Tag Team Champions. (1 time, current)
- Impact Wrestling
  - Impact World Tag Team Championship (1 time)
  - Call Your Shot Gauntlet Trophy (2020) – Rhino
  - Moment of the Year (2020) – Heath debuting on Impact at Slammiversary, shared with the other returns and debuts that night
- Insane Wrestling Revolution
  - IWR World Tag Team Championship (1 time)
- Squared Circle Expo
  - SCX Tag Team Championship (1 time)
- WWE
  - WWE SmackDown Tag Team Championship (1 time, inaugural)
  - WWE SmackDown Tag Team Championship Tournament (2016)
- Xtreme Intense Championship Wrestling
  - XICW Tag Team Championship (1 time, current)
