= No Mercy (2016) =

WWE pay-per-view and livestreaming event

- Promotional poster featuring The Miz and Maryse
- Promotion: WWE
- Brand: SmackDown
- Date: October 9, 2016
- City: Sacramento, California
- Venue: Golden 1 Center
- Attendance: 14,324

WWE event chronology
← Previous; Clash of Champions	Next → Hell in a Cell

No Mercy chronology
← Previous; 2008	Next → 2017

The 2016 No Mercy was a professional wrestling pay-per-view (PPV) and livestreaming event produced by WWE, held exclusively for wrestlers from the promotion's main roster brand, SmackDown. It was the 12th No Mercy and took place on October 9, 2016, at the Golden 1 Center in Sacramento, California. It was the first No Mercy held since 2008 and it was also the first SmackDown-exclusive No Mercy since 2006. This also made it the first No Mercy to livestream on the WWE Network, which launched in 2014. Unlike the majority of WWE's PPV and livestreaming events, No Mercy 2016 was not released on DVD or Blu-Ray.

Eight matches were contested at the event, including one on the Kickoff pre-show. In the advertised main event, AJ Styles defeated Dean Ambrose and John Cena in a triple threat match to retain the WWE World Championship. The advertised main event was originally scheduled to close the show, however, it instead opened the show; this was changed the day of the event due to the second United States presidential debate airing at the same time that the match would have occurred. Due to this change, the final match saw Bray Wyatt face Randy Orton, which Wyatt won. In another prominent match, Dolph Ziggler defeated The Miz to win the Intercontinental Championship in a title vs. career match.

== Production ==
=== Background ===
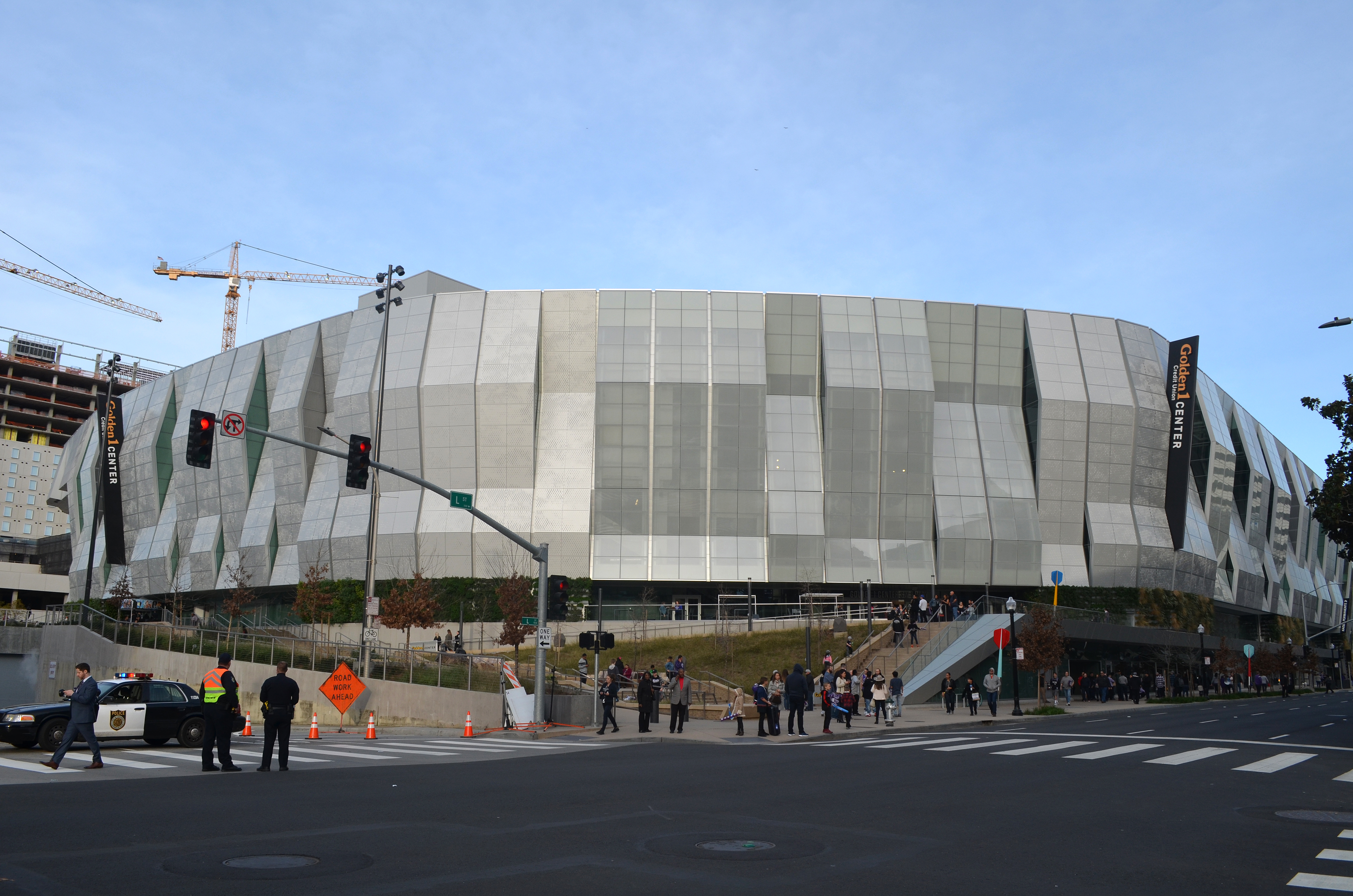
The 12th No Mercy, which was the first held since 2008, took place at the Golden 1 Center in Sacramento, California.

No Mercy was first held by WWE as a United Kingdom-exclusive professional wrestling pay-per-view (PPV) event in May 1999, before it became the promotion's annual October PPV that same year, but held in the United States, until 2008. In 2009, No Mercy was replaced by Hell in a Cell as the annual October PPV.

In August 2011, the first brand extension ended, but it was reintroduced in July 2016, which again divided the main roster between the Raw and SmackDown brands, where wrestlers were exclusively assigned to perform. As a result, brand-exclusive PPVs returned (which had been done during the first brand split from 2003 to 2007), which increased the amount of these events held per year. As such, on August 15, 2016, No Mercy was reinstated to be held on October 9, 2016, at the Golden 1 Center in Sacramento, California. Like during the first brand extension, in which No Mercy was SmackDown-exclusive from 2003 to 2006, the 2016 event was also held exclusively for SmackDown. Tickets went on sale on August 19 through Ticketmaster. In addition to traditional PPV, the 12th No Mercy was the first to livestream on WWE's online streaming service, the WWE Network, which launched in February 2014.

This was also the first No Mercy held to be promoted under the company's shortened trade name of WWE, as following WrestleMania XXVII in April 2011, the company ceased using its full name of World Wrestling Entertainment, although that remains the legal name of the company.

=== Storylines ===
The event comprised eight matches, including one on the Kickoff pre-show, that resulted from scripted storylines. Results were predetermined by WWE's writers on the SmackDown brand, while storylines were produced on WWE's weekly television show, SmackDown Live.

At SummerSlam, AJ Styles defeated John Cena. Styles went on to win the WWE World Championship at Backlash, when he defeated Dean Ambrose after a low blow and a Styles Clash. Two days later on SmackDown, Cena demanded a rematch against Styles in an attempt to become a 16-time world champion, equaling the record set by Ric Flair, while Ambrose invoked his rematch clause against Styles. SmackDown Commissioner Shane McMahon scheduled a triple threat match between Styles, Cena, and Ambrose for the title at No Mercy. On October 9, the day of the event, WWE announced that, due to No Mercy airing simultaneously with the second United States presidential debate, the world championship triple threat match would begin the pay-per-view portion of the event.

At Backlash, Becky Lynch defeated Alexa Bliss, Carmella, Naomi, Natalya, and Nikki Bella in a six-pack elimination challenge to become the inaugural SmackDown Women's Champion. On the September 13 episode of SmackDown, Bliss won a fatal five-way match by defeating Carmella, Bella, Natalya, and Naomi to receive a title opportunity against Lynch at No Mercy. The following week, Bliss attacked Lynch during their contract signing. On October 8, it was revealed by the Wrestling Observer Newsletter that Lynch would not compete at No Mercy due to an out-of-ring injury.

At Backlash, Heath Slater and Rhyno defeated The Usos (Jey Uso and Jimmy Uso) in a tag team tournament final to become the inaugural SmackDown Tag Team Champions, which also earned Slater a SmackDown contract in the process. On the September 20 episode of SmackDown, The Usos defeated American Alpha (Chad Gable and Jason Jordan) to earn a rematch against Slater and Rhyno for the titles at No Mercy.

At Backlash, The Miz defeated Dolph Ziggler to retain the Intercontinental Championship when Maryse sprayed pepper spray in Ziggler's face. Two weeks later, Miz again defeated Ziggler in a title match after he used the spray on Ziggler. The next week, Ziggler put his career on the line if Miz gave him one more title shot; The Miz agreed to the match, to take place at No Mercy. The next week on SmackDown, Miz showed a video package highlighting Ziggler's most embarrassing moments in his career, including his days as a member of the Spirit Squad. Miz then introduced fellow Spirit Squad members, Mikey and Kenny, who first cheered and mocked Dolph before attacking him. Ziggler then fought off Mikey and Kenny, before Miz fled.

At Backlash, Bray Wyatt attacked Randy Orton backstage, leaving him unable to compete and winning their match by forfeit. In the following weeks, the two continued to taunt each other, including segments in which either wrestler went looking for the other backstage. On September 28, a match between the two was scheduled for No Mercy.

On the August 23 episode of SmackDown, Carmella attacked Nikki Bella before their scheduled match, then afterwards on Talking Smack, and again during a match on the October 4 episode of SmackDown. Subsequently, a match between the two was scheduled for No Mercy.

On August 16, Curt Hawkins began to appear in a series of vignettes similar to Chuck Norris facts, signaling his return to WWE on the SmackDown brand. In the last vignette, he revealed that he would be "stepping into the ring" at No Mercy.

On the September 13 episode of SmackDown, Jack Swagger appeared and confronted Baron Corbin. On the October 4 episode, Swagger defeated Corbin in controversial fashion. The referee called for the bell, believing Corbin had indicated submission, when he was in fact reaching for the rope to break the Patriot Lock applied by Swagger. The following day, a match between the two was scheduled for No Mercy.

== Event ==
Other on-screen personnel
Role:	Name:
English commentators	Mauro Ranallo
English commentators	John "Bradshaw" Layfield
English commentators	David Otunga
Spanish commentators	Carlos Cabrera
Spanish commentators	Marcelo Rodríguez
German commentators	Sebastian Hackl
German commentators	Carsten Schaefer
Ring announcer	Greg Hamilton
Referees	Dan Engler
Referees	Jason Ayers
Referees	Mike Chioda
Referees	Ryan Tran
Pre-show panel	Renee Young
Pre-show panel	Booker T
Pre-show panel	Jerry Lawler
Pre-show panel	Lita
Talking Smack panel	Renee Young
Talking Smack panel	Daniel Bryan

=== Pre-show ===
During the No Mercy Kickoff pre-show, Curt Hawkins made his WWE return. As advertised, he stepped into the ring. However, he did not compete, but announced that his first match would take place on the following episode of SmackDown.

After this, Shane McMahon and Daniel Bryan informed Alexa Bliss that for medical reasons, SmackDown Women's Champion Becky Lynch would not be able to compete, that the scheduled title match would be postponed to the November 8 episode of SmackDown, and that Bliss would face a different opponent later in the night.

Also during the pre-show, The Hype Bros (Mojo Rawley and Zack Ryder) and American Alpha (Chad Gable and Jason Jordan) faced The Ascension (Konnor and Viktor) and The Vaudevillains (Simon Gotch and Aiden English). In the end, Jordan performed Grand Amplitude on English to win the match.

=== Main show ===
The actual pay-per-view opened with the advertised main event, which was the triple threat match in which AJ Styles defended the WWE World Championship against Dean Ambrose and John Cena. During the match, Cena executed an "Attitude Adjustment" on Ambrose for a near-fall. Cena applied the "STF" on Ambrose, who did not submit. Styles performed a "Springboard 450 Splash" on Ambrose for a near-fall. Styles executed a "Styles Clash" on Ambrose, which was followed by Cena applying the "STF" on Styles, but Ambrose broke the hold. Later, Ambrose applied the "Calf Crusher" and Cena applied the "STF" on Styles simultaneously; Styles submitted, but the referee continued the match as two participants cannot submit another one at the same time. Ambrose executed "Dirty Deeds" on Cena, but Styles voided the pinfall by pulling the referee out of the ring. In the end, after Cena executed a Super "Attitude Adjustment" on Ambrose, Styles attacked Cena with a chair immediately and pinned him to retain the title.

Next, Nikki Bella faced Carmella. The end came when Nikki executed a "Rack Attack 2.0" on Carmella to win the match.

After that, Heath Slater and Rhyno defended the SmackDown Tag Team Championship against The Usos (Jey and Jimmy Uso). The match ended when Rhyno executed a "Gore" on Jey to retain the titles.

In the fourth match, Jack Swagger faced Baron Corbin. In the end, Swagger applied the "Patriot Lock" on Corbin, but Corbin reached the ring apron, forcing Swagger to break the hold, and poked Swagger's eye. Corbin performed the "End of Days" on Swagger to win the match.

Next, Dolph Ziggler challenged The Miz for the Intercontinental Championship in a title vs. career match. During the match, Miz applied the "Figure Four Leglock", but Ziggler touched the ropes, forcing Miz to break the hold. Ziggler executed a "Zig Zag" on Miz for a near-fall. After Maryse blinded Ziggler with pepper spray, Miz executed a "Skull Crushing Finale", but Ziggler placed his foot on the bottom rope to void the pinfall. The Spirit Squad (Mikey and Kenny) appeared to distract Ziggler, but Ziggler knocked Mikey off the ring apron with a Superkick. Miz performed another "Skull Crushing Finale" on Ziggler for a near-fall. The referee ejected Maryse, Mikey, and Kenny from ringside. Ziggler executed a Superkick on Miz to win the title and save his career.

After that, Alexa Bliss came out. Earlier in the night, SmackDown Women's Champion Becky Lynch had been declared unable to compete. Bliss complained about her title opportunity being postponed only for her replacement opponent, Naomi, to interrupt her. In the end, Bliss attempted a Cross Armbar, but Naomi shifted her weight to pin Bliss and win the match.

In the final match, Randy Orton fought Bray Wyatt. During the match, Orton attempted an "RKO" on Wyatt, but Wyatt countered by throwing Orton over the broadcast table. Wyatt attempted "Sister Abigail" on Orton, but Orton countered with an "RKO" attempt, only for Wyatt to counter into a Uranage Slam for a near-fall. Outside the ring, Wyatt draped Orton over the steel steps and attempted a Running Senton, but Orton rolled off and Wyatt crashed onto the steps. In the climax, Orton executed an Elevated DDT on Wyatt and attempted an "RKO", but the lights went out and a returning Luke Harper appeared in the ring, distracting Orton. Wyatt executed "Sister Abigail" on Orton to win the match.

== Aftermath ==
On the following SmackDown, Shane McMahon and Daniel Bryan challenged Raw to three traditional Survivor Series elimination matches – involving each brand's best five male wrestlers, best five female wrestlers, and best five tag teams, respectively, to which Raw Commissioner Stephanie McMahon accepted. Focus then shifted on determining which wrestlers would represent Team SmackDown for the three teams at Survivor Series the following month. Also during this time, Dean Ambrose became the number one contender against AJ Styles for the WWE World Championship at SmackDown's next pay-per-view, TLC: Tables, Ladders & Chairs, in a Tables, Ladders, and Chairs match, and Randy Orton joined The Wyatt Family in an "if you can't beat them, join them" scenario.

Dolph Ziggler offered The Miz a rematch for the Intercontinental Championship, but The Miz refused. Ziggler then made an open challenge to any Raw wrestler to face Ziggler for the title at Survivor Series. In response and thanks to Miz's wife Maryse, Miz got a rematch for the title before Survivor Series. Also, due to SmackDown defending their Intercontinental title against a wrestler from Raw, Daniel Bryan came to negotiations with Raw's General Manager Mick Foley to have Raw's WWE Cruiserweight Championship defended against a SmackDown wrestler. Bryan chose Kalisto and revealed that if Kalisto won, the entire cruiserweight division would come to SmackDown.

On the November 15 episode of SmackDown, The Miz defeated Dolph Ziggler to win the Intercontinental Championship after interference from Maryse. The following week, after Miz won his match, Ziggler performed a Superkick on Miz, and a ladder match between the two for the title was subsequently scheduled for TLC.

During Survivor Series, Nikki Bella, who was the captain of Team SmackDown for the women's elimination match, was attacked backstage. On the following SmackDown, Nikki accused Carmella of being the attacker, which Carmella denied. Nikki added that regardless of who attacked her, she would settle her differences with Carmella at TLC in a no disqualification match.

Baron Corbin and Jack Swagger had a rematch on the October 18 episode of SmackDown, where Corbin was again victorious. This would be Swagger's final WWE appearance before his release the following year.

Another match between Naomi and Alexa Bliss took place on the October 18 episode of SmackDown, where Bliss was victorious. On the November 8 episode, Becky Lynch retained the SmackDown Women's Championship against Bliss by submission, despite Bliss' foot being on the bottom rope. Due to this, another title match between Lynch and Bliss was scheduled for TLC, which was stipulated as a tables match.

While this 2016 event was held exclusively for SmackDown, the 2017 event was held exclusively for Raw.

== Results ==
No.	Results	Stipulations	Times
1^{P}	The Hype Bros (Mojo Rawley and Zack Ryder) and American Alpha (Chad Gable and Jason Jordan) defeated The Ascension (Konnor and Viktor) and The Vaudevillains (Aiden English and Simon Gotch) by pinfall	Eight-man tag team match	9:10
2	AJ Styles (c) defeated Dean Ambrose and John Cena by pinfall	Triple threat match for the WWE World Championship	21:15
3	Nikki Bella defeated Carmella by pinfall	Singles match	8:05
4	Heath Slater and Rhyno (c) defeated The Usos (Jey Uso and Jimmy Uso) by pinfall	Tag team match for the WWE SmackDown Tag Team Championship	10:17
5	Baron Corbin defeated Jack Swagger by pinfall	Singles match	7:30
6	Dolph Ziggler defeated The Miz (c) (with Maryse) by pinfall	Title vs. Career match for the WWE Intercontinental Championship; Had Ziggler lost, he would have been forced to retire from in-ring competition.	19:42
7	Naomi defeated Alexa Bliss by pinfall	Singles match	5:25
8	Bray Wyatt defeated Randy Orton by pinfall	Singles match	15:40
(c) / – the champion(s) heading into the match; P / – the match was broadcast on the pre-show
