= Survivor Series (2016) =

WWE pay-per-view and livestreaming event

- Promotional poster featuring Brock Lesnar and Goldberg
- Promotion: WWE
- Brand(s): Raw; SmackDown
- Date: November 20, 2016
- City: Toronto, Ontario, Canada
- Venue: Air Canada Centre
- Attendance: 17,143
- Tagline: Fantasy Warfare Just Got Real

WWE event chronology
← Previous; NXT TakeOver: Toronto	Next → TLC: Tables, Ladders & Chairs

Survivor Series chronology
← Previous; 2015	Next → 2017

WWE in Canada chronology
← Previous; NXT TakeOver: Toronto	Next → NXT TakeOver: Toronto

The 2016 Survivor Series was a professional wrestling pay-per-view (PPV) and livestreaming event produced by the American company WWE, held for wrestlers from the promotion's main roster brands, Raw and SmackDown. It was the 30th annual Survivor Series and took place on November 20, 2016, at the Air Canada Centre in Toronto, Ontario, Canada. The event centered on the Survivor Series match, a tag team elimination match that pits teams of multiple wrestlers against each other. The event was also based around interbrand competition.

Eight matches were contested at the event, including two on the Kickoff pre-show. The main event featured the in-ring return of Goldberg, who last wrestled at WrestleMania XX in March 2004, where he defeated Brock Lesnar in 1 minute and 26 seconds, which was a rematch from that WrestleMania. The other five matches on the main card were interbrand matches, featuring wrestlers from Raw against those from SmackDown, similar to WWE's previous Bragging Rights event. Three of those matches were Survivor Series matches; Raw's women and tag teams defeated SmackDown's while SmackDown's men defeated Raw in the penultimate match. In other prominent matches, SmackDown's Intercontinental Champion The Miz and Raw's Cruiserweight Champion The Brian Kendrick retained their titles against challengers from the opposing brand, Raw's Sami Zayn and SmackDown's Kalisto, respectively; had Kalisto won the Cruiserweight Championship, the entire cruiserweight division would have been transferred to SmackDown. The 2016 event also had both the longest and the (tied) shortest matches in the event's history.

This was the second Survivor Series to take place in Canada, after 1997, which was in Montreal, Quebec. It was also the first Survivor Series to be four hours in length as well as the first held following the reintroduction of the brand split in July. This event was the genesis of what became the brand supremacy theme of Survivor Series for the next five years, where in addition to Survivor Series matches that pitted the brands against each other, the champions of each brand faced off in non-title matches.

== Production ==
=== Background ===
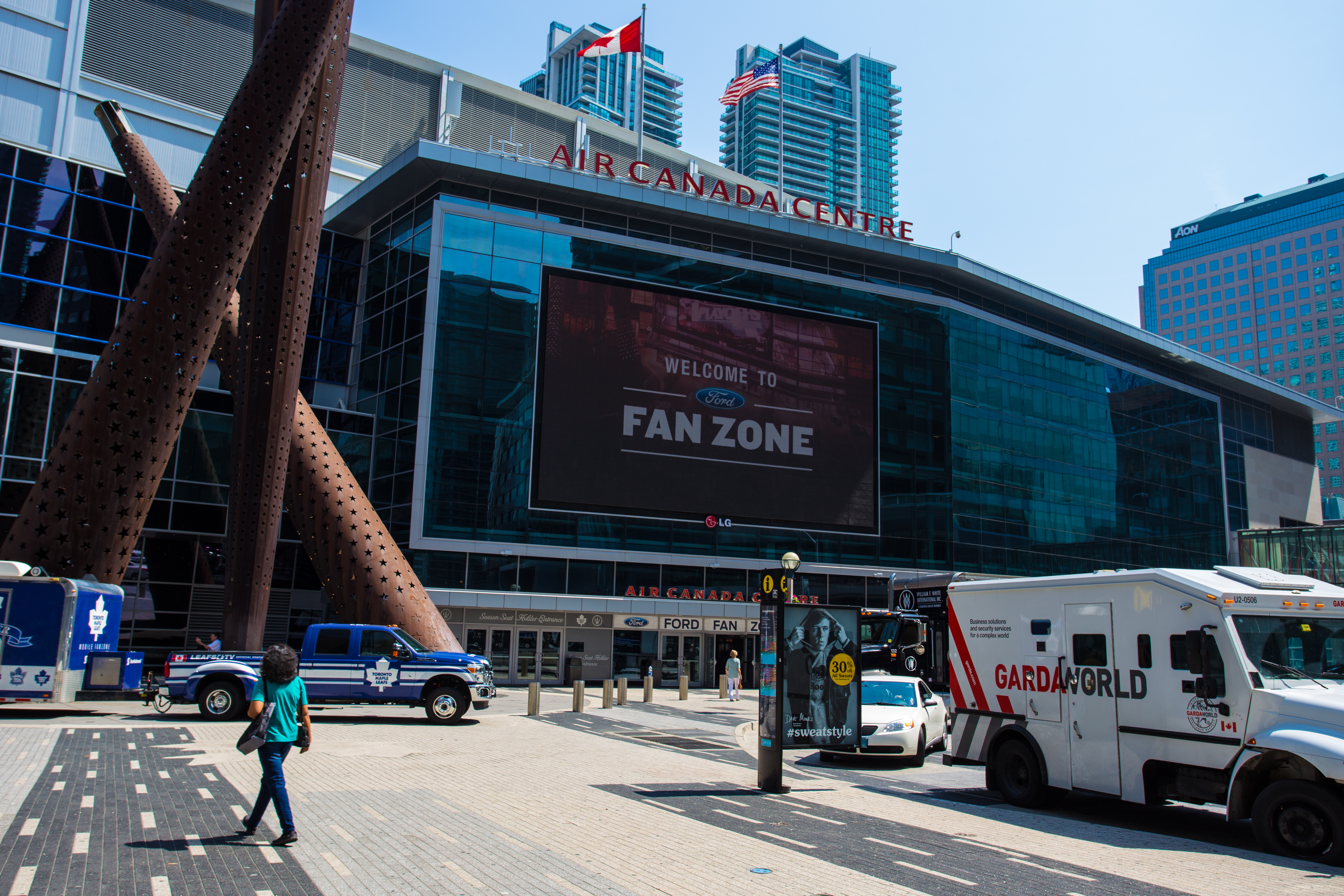
The 30th annual Survivor Series event was held at the Air Canada Centre in Toronto, Ontario, Canada, which was the second Survivor Series in Canada, after 1997.

Survivor Series is an annual professional wrestling event, produced every November by WWE since 1987, generally held around Thanksgiving in the United States. It was originally broadcast exclusively via pay-per-view (PPV) before it began simultaneously livestreaming on the WWE Network in 2014. In what has become the second longest-running PPV event in history (behind WWE's WrestleMania), it is one of the promotion's original four PPVs, along with WrestleMania, SummerSlam, and Royal Rumble, referred to as the "Big Four". The event is traditionally characterized by having Survivor Series matches, which are tag team elimination matches that typically pits teams of four or five wrestlers against each other. The 30th Survivor Series event was scheduled to be held on November 20, 2016, at the Air Canada Centre in Toronto, Ontario, Canada and was the first Survivor Series event to take place in Canada, after 1997, which was in Montreal, Quebec and was known for the infamous "Montreal Screwjob" incident. Tickets went on sale on July 15 through Ticketmaster.

In July, WWE reintroduced the brand extension, again splitting the main roster between the Raw and SmackDown brands where wrestlers were exclusively assigned to perform. Subsequently, Survivor Series featured several interpromotional matches to determine which was the better brand, similar to WWE's previous Bragging Rights event. WWE also expanded the event's length to four hours, marking the first Survivor Series held for this length, which was previously reserved for WrestleMania.

=== Storylines ===
The event comprised eight matches, including two on the Kickoff pre-show, that resulted from scripted storylines. Results were predetermined by WWE's writers on the Raw and SmackDown brands, while storylines were produced on WWE's weekly television shows, Monday Night Raw and SmackDown Live.

On the October 11 episode of SmackDown, SmackDown's Commissioner Shane McMahon and General Manager Daniel Bryan challenged Raw to three traditional Survivor Series elimination matches, involving each brand's best five male wrestlers, best five female wrestlers, and best five tag teams, respectively—with the latter having a total of 10 wrestlers per team, but with the stipulation being that if one member of a tag team was eliminated, both members of that particular tag team were eliminated (this was the first Survivor Series since the 1988 event to have teams of five tag teams going against each other). The following week on Raw, Raw Commissioner Stephanie McMahon accepted the challenge to determine the better brand; this would be the genesis for the theme of the next five events.

Over the following weeks, several tag teams were scheduled for the tag team elimination match. For Team SmackDown, Heath Slater and Rhyno were made captain by virtue of being SmackDown Tag Team Champions on the October 25 episode of SmackDown. They then successfully defended their titles (and their spot at Survivor Series) against The Spirit Squad (Kenny and Mikey) in an impromptu match. The same night, The Hype Bros (Zack Ryder and Mojo Rawley) qualified for the team by defeating The Ascension (Konnor and Viktor). American Alpha (Jason Jordan and Chad Gable) and The Usos (Jey Uso and Jimmy Uso) both qualified on the November 1 episode by defeating The Spirit Squad and The Headbangers (Mosh and Thrasher), respectively. On the November 8 episode, Breezango defeated The Vaudevillains (Aiden English and Simon Gotch) to qualify as the final tag team for Team SmackDown. On the final SmackDown before Survivor Series, Booker T in his King Booker character gave a motivational speech to the team. For Team Raw, Raw Tag Team Champions The New Day (Big E, Kofi Kingston, and Xavier Woods) were revealed as captains on the October 31 episode of Raw. The remaining four spots were filled the following week: Cesaro and Sheamus, Luke Gallows and Karl Anderson, Enzo Amore and Big Cass, and The Golden Truth (Goldust and R-Truth). The New Day addressed the teams and then Gallows and Anderson, who were at odds with the rest of Team Raw, defeated Big E and Kingston in a non-title match. Also, R-Truth sold his team's spot to The Shining Stars (Epico and Primo) for a timeshare. The Golden Truth then fought The Shining Stars in a losing effort to get their spot back.

The spots for the women's elimination match were also successively filled. On the October 25 episode of SmackDown, Nikki Bella became captain of Team SmackDown by defeating Natalya, who had demanded that position for herself. On the November 1 episode, SmackDown Women's Champion Becky Lynch, the number one contender Alexa Bliss, Carmella, and Naomi were revealed as the remaining team members, with Natalya introduced as the team's coach. On the November 8 episode, the team's unity was strained when Carmella confronted Bella. Natalya, who was involved in a match against Naomi, tried to separate the two, which cost her the match. The same night, Lynch successfully defended her championship against Bliss, albeit in controversial fashion. For Team Raw, Raw Women's Champion Charlotte Flair (as team captain), Bayley, and Nia Jax were revealed as team members on the October 31 episode of Raw. On the November 7 episode, Alicia Fox and Sasha Banks were introduced as the final members. Earlier, Charlotte had falsely advertised her protégé Dana Brooke as the fifth member, only to be corrected by Michael Cole. Banks, Bayley, and Fox then defeated Charlotte, Jax, and Brooke in a six-woman tag team match when Bayley pinned Charlotte. On the November 14 episode, due to differences between team members, Charlotte and Banks teamed up and defeated Fox and Jax. On the final SmackDown before Survivor Series, Charlotte came down to ringside during a match between Bella and Carmella. Bella then attacked Charlotte, which prompted the rest of Team Raw to attack Bella. Carmella and the rest of Team SmackDown then came to Bella's aid. The two teams brawled with Team SmackDown getting the upper hand.

The teams for the men's elimination match began to take shape on the October 31 episode of Raw, when after weeks of lobbying for the position, WWE Universal Champion Kevin Owens and Chris Jericho were made co-captains of Team Raw. General Manager Mick Foley then also added United States Champion Roman Reigns. Braun Strowman qualified by winning a 12-man battle royal. On the November 7 episode, Seth Rollins was revealed as the final member. To settle the team's differences, Stephanie McMahon put all five men in a fatal five-way match, which culminated in Owens accidentally pinning Jericho. On the final Raw before Survivor Series, Stephanie tested the team's unity by having the team of Owens and Reigns and the team of Jericho, Rollins, and Strowman face Cesaro and Sheamus and The New Day, respectively, which both teams won. For Team SmackDown, Daniel Bryan introduced all members on the November 1 episode of SmackDown: WWE World Champion AJ Styles (as captain), Dean Ambrose, Randy Orton, Bray Wyatt, and Baron Corbin. A week later, Shane McMahon made James Ellsworth the team's mascot. To settle some of the team's differences, Shane also scheduled a six-man tag match pitting The New Wyatt Family (Bray, Orton, and Luke Harper) against Ambrose, Ellsworth, and Corbin. When Corbin refused to take part in the match, he was replaced by Kane, and Corbin instead wrestled Kalisto; during the match, he was kayfabe injured, rendering him unable to compete at Survivor Series. After the Wyatts defeated Ambrose, Ellsworth, and Kane, Daniel Bryan named Shane McMahon as Corbin's replacement at Survivor Series. On the November 7 episode of Raw, Stephanie invited both Shane and Bryan to appear on the following week's Raw to address the interpromotional matches, which Shane and Bryan accepted. During this meeting, each commissioner and general manager touted the reasons for why their respective brand was better and eventually called out their respective male teams. In the ensuing battle, Roman Reigns and Seth Rollins of Team Raw stood tall at the end. On the final SmackDown before Survivor Series, SmackDown's male team were the guests on Edge's Cutting Edge show to address the match and their team unity. The Undertaker then came out and warned the team to win the match or face consequences.

At WrestleMania XX in 2004, Goldberg defeated Brock Lesnar. This was their only match against each other as both left WWE after the event; Lesnar returned to WWE in 2012. Goldberg, who originally had no intention of ever returning to WWE, began a working relationship with the promotion again in January 2016, thanks to 2K Sports, which publishes the WWE 2K video games. On the May 30 episode of Raw, Goldberg was revealed as the pre-order bonus for WWE 2K17, which featured Lesnar on the cover. During the 2016 SummerSlam weekend at the WWE 2K event in Germany, Goldberg jokingly challenged Lesnar to a match. Lesnar and Goldberg continually traded barbs and insults against each other on social media and at WWE 2K17 press events. On October 5, Goldberg appeared on ESPN's SportsCenter with Jonathan Coachman to promote his appearance in WWE 2K17. He teased a possible return to WWE, and stated that he would want to face Lesnar if he were to return because he owed Lesnar a rematch. On the October 10 episode of Raw, Paul Heyman on behalf of Lesnar issued a challenge to Goldberg, stating that Goldberg was the one blemish on Lesnar's WWE career. On the October 17 episode, Goldberg, in his first appearance on WWE television since 2004, accepted the challenge. The following week, the match was scheduled for Survivor Series. On the October 31 episode of Raw, Heyman interrupted Goldberg and teased that Lesnar was there to fight, but then Rusev came out to confront Goldberg. Goldberg attacked Rusev with a Jackhammer and Heyman with a Spear. On the November 7 episode, video packages were shown hyping the match, with the announcement that both Goldberg and Lesnar would come face-to-face the following week. On the final Raw before Survivor Series, both men addressed each other, albeit with security officers between them. Lesnar pushed some officers into Goldberg, and Goldberg cleared out the rest. Lesnar then retreated instead of staying to fight.

At No Mercy, Dolph Ziggler defeated The Miz in a career vs. title match for the Intercontinental Championship. Ziggler offered The Miz a rematch for the title, but The Miz refused. On the November 1 episode of SmackDown, after successfully defending the Intercontinental Championship against Curt Hawkins, Ziggler made an open challenge to any wrestler from the Raw brand to face him for the title at Survivor Series. On the November 7 episode of Raw, Sami Zayn revealed that Mick Foley wanted him to face Ziggler for the Intercontinental title, but Stephanie preferred Rusev and scheduled a match between the two, with the winner going on to face Ziggler. Zayn defeated Rusev, earning the title match. However, his opponent changed when The Miz regained the title from Ziggler, albeit with help from Maryse, on SmackDown's 900th episode on November 15.

On the November 8 episode of SmackDown, Bryan revealed that since SmackDown's Intercontinental Championship would be defended against a wrestler from Raw, Foley allowed Raw's WWE Cruiserweight Champion The Brian Kendrick to defend the title against a SmackDown wrestler. Bryan chose Kalisto and revealed that if Kalisto would win the title, the entire cruiserweight division would come to SmackDown. On the November 14 episode of Raw, Kendrick addressed the cruiserweights, and assured them that he would defeat Kalisto and keep the division on Raw. However, all were at odds with him and Sin Cara, Kalisto's former tag team partner, stated that Kalisto would be a better champion. Kendrick won an ensuing match against Sin Cara by submission.

== Event ==
Other on-screen personnel
Role:	Name:
English commentators	Michael Cole (Raw)
English commentators	Corey Graves (Raw/Cruiserweight matches)
English commentators	Byron Saxton (Raw)
English commentators	Mauro Ranallo (SmackDown/Cruiserweight matches)
English commentators	John "Bradshaw" Layfield (SmackDown)
English commentators	David Otunga (SmackDown)
Spanish commentators	Carlos Cabrera
Spanish commentators	Marcelo Rodríguez
German commentators	Carsten Schaefer
German commentators	Sebastian Hackl
Ring announcers	Greg Hamilton
Ring announcers	JoJo
Referees	Jason Ayers
Referees	John Cone
Referees	Dan Engler
Referees	Darrick Moore
Referees	Chad Patton
Referees	Ryan Tran
Referees	Rod Zapata
Backstage interviewers	Tom Phillips
Backstage interviewers	Dasha Fuentes
Pre-show panel	Renee Young
Pre-show panel	Booker T
Pre-show panel	Lita
Pre-show panel	Jerry Lawler

=== Pre-show ===
During the Survivor Series Kickoff pre-show, T. J. Perkins, Rich Swann, and Noam Dar defeated Tony Nese, Drew Gulak, and Ariya Daivari when Swann executed a standing 450° splash on Daivari for a pinfall.

Later, Kane defeated Luke Harper after a chokeslam.

=== Preliminary matches ===
The actual pay-per-view opened with the women's Survivor Series match pitting Team Raw (Charlotte, Bayley, Sasha Banks, Alicia Fox, and Nia Jax) against Team SmackDown (Nikki Bella, Carmella, Naomi, Alexa Bliss, and Becky Lynch) in a 5-on-5 Survivor Series Elimination Match. Immediately before the match, SmackDown's captain Nikki Bella was attacked backstage, leaving her unable to compete, and team coach Natalya replaced her. Fox pinned Carmella after a scissors kick but was herself pinned by Bliss after Twisted Bliss. Naomi was counted out after Jax attacked her. Natalya pinned Banks with a roll-up but was pinned by Charlotte after a Queen's Boot. Lynch forced Jax submit to the Dis-arm-her, eliminating Jax. Charlotte pinned Bliss with a Queen's Boot. Bayley pinned Lynch after a Bayley-to-Belly Suplex, leaving Bayley and Charlotte as the survivors for Team Raw. After the match, Charlotte attacked Bayley.

Next, The Miz defended the Intercontinental Championship against Sami Zayn. In the end, Zayn applied the Figure-four leglock on Miz; as Miz was about to submit, Miz's manager Maryse rang the ring bell. Zayn released the hold, thinking he had won, but Miz pinned him with a roll-up to retain the title.

After this, Team Raw (The New Day (Big E and Kofi Kingston), Cesaro and Sheamus, Enzo Amore and Big Cass, The Shining Stars (Epico and Primo), and Luke Gallows and Karl Anderson) faced Team SmackDown (Heath Slater and Rhyno, The Hype Bros (Zack Ryder and Mojo Rawley), American Alpha (Chad Gable and Jason Jordan), Breezango (Tyler Breeze and Fandango), and The Usos (Jey Uso and Jimmy Uso)) in the tag team's Survivor Series match. Breezango, in their new fashion police attire, began by handing out tickets to everyone but were quickly eliminated by The New Day after the Midnight Hour (a Big Ending and diving DDT combination) on Fandango. Immediately after, Jimmy executed a superkick on Kingston for a pinfall to eliminate New Day. Gallows and Anderson performed a Magic Killer on Zack Ryder, eliminating The Hype Bros. American Alpha executed an electric chair/diving bulldog combination on Primo, eliminating The Shining Stars. Gallows and Anderson eliminated American Alpha with a Magic Killer on Jason Jordan, but were eliminated by Rhyno and Heath Slater after Rhyno performed a Gore on Gallows. Enzo Amore and Big Cass then performed a Bada Boom Shakalaka on Rhyno, eliminating him and Heath Slater. The Usos eliminated Enzo and Cass after a Samoan Splash on Enzo. In the end, Cesaro applied the Sharpshooter on Jey while Sheamus performed a Brogue Kick on Jimmy. Jey submitted, leaving Cesaro and Sheamus as the sole survivors for Team Raw.

In the fourth match, The Brian Kendrick defended the WWE Cruiserweight Championship against Kalisto. Kendrick won by disqualification after Baron Corbin attacked Kendrick and then Kalisto, meaning Kendrick retained the title and the cruiserweight division remained on Raw. Backstage, Daniel Bryan confronted Corbin, who explained that he acted out of revenge on Kalisto to prevent more cruiserweights from appearing on SmackDown.

The next match was the men's Survivor Series elimination match featuring Team Raw (Kevin Owens, Chris Jericho, Braun Strowman, Roman Reigns, and Seth Rollins) against Team SmackDown (AJ Styles, Dean Ambrose, Bray Wyatt, Randy Orton, and Shane McMahon), who were accompanied by their mascot, James Ellsworth. Early in the match, Ambrose and Styles got into a heated argument. Ambrose attacked Styles, but was surprised by Strowman, who scored a pinfall after a running powerslam; Styles did not attempt to break the pin. Afterwards outside the ring, Orton executed an RKO on Strowman onto a broadcast table. McMahon put Strowman through the table with a Leap of Faith. Strowman was counted out when Ellsworth, who hid under the ring, held Strowman's legs to prevent him from returning to the ring. Strowman then chased Ellsworth up the entrance ramp and threw him off the stage. Later, Styles attempted the Styles Clash on Jericho but Owens attacked Styles with the List of Jericho and was disqualified. Jericho was distraught by his list being ripped apart. This allowed Orton to pin him after an RKO. McMahon then attempted a Coast to Coast but Reigns caught him mid-air with a spear. The referee ruled the apparently unconscious Shane unfit to continue, eliminating him from the match. Ambrose, who had already been eliminated, returned to attack Styles and helped his former Shield brethren Rollins and Reigns perform a triple powerbomb on Styles through a broadcast table. Rollins rolled Styles back in the ring for the pinfall. As Rollins attempted a Frog Splash on Wyatt, Orton quickly performed an RKO on Rollins, allowing Wyatt to score a pinfall. Reigns, Team Raw's final member, attempted a spear on Wyatt, however, Reigns performed a spear on Orton instead, who had pushed Wyatt out of the way. Wyatt then performed Sister Abigail on Reigns for the pin, leaving Wyatt and Orton as the survivors for Team SmackDown.

=== Main event ===
In the main event, Goldberg faced Brock Lesnar (accompanied by Paul Heyman). Lesnar tackled Goldberg into the corner, only for Goldberg to shove Lesnar to the mat. As Lesnar stood up, Goldberg performed a spear on Lesnar. Goldberg then executed another spear and a Jackhammer on Lesnar to win the match.

== Aftermath ==
=== Raw ===
On the following night's Raw, Goldberg celebrated his victory over Brock Lesnar and declared himself as the first entrant in the 2017 Royal Rumble match. The following week, Paul Heyman commented that he and Lesnar had been humiliated by Goldberg, whom they had underestimated, and that Lesnar would also compete in the Royal Rumble. Lesnar entered at number twenty-six and dispatched of several other wrestlers before Goldberg came out at number twenty-eight and once again humiliated Lesnar by quickly eliminating him from the match. They fought once more at WrestleMania 33, where Lesnar defeated Goldberg in a match for the Universal Championship to end the feud.

On the post-Survivor Series Raw, Sami Zayn was punished for failing to bring the Intercontinental Championship to his brand by being put into a match against Braun Strowman. Strowman brutalized Zayn until he was no longer able to compete and Mick Foley stopped the match, giving the win to Strowman. The following week, Zayn demanded a rematch, but Foley declined, telling Zayn that he could not beat Strowman. Zayn shoved off and on the December 12 episode, again asked for a rematch, but was again rejected. Zayn pondered switching to SmackDown because Foley did not believe in him. After Strowman won his match, Strowman declared that no one could last two minutes with him. Later that night, after Zayn won his match, Foley told Zayn that he had arranged to trade Zayn to SmackDown in return for Eva Marie. An angry Zayn refused such a lopsided trade and again demanded for a rematch against Strowman. Foley yielded and scheduled Zayn to face Strowman at Roadblock: End of the Line in a match with a ten-minute time limit.

After winning the elimination tag team match for Raw, Cesaro and Sheamus were granted a title shot for the Raw Tag Team Championship against The New Day (Kofi Kingston and Big E, accompanied by Xavier Woods) the next night on Raw. However, The New Day retained. Two weeks later, Cesaro and Sheamus fought Luke Gallows and Karl Anderson to determine the number one contenders, but the match ended in a no contest when The New Day interfered. This turned the title match on the December 12 episode into a triple threat tag team match, where The New Day retained. At WWE Tribute to the Troops, Cesaro and Sheamus earned another title match at Roadblock: End of the Line by winning a fatal four-way tag team match.

On the Highlight Reel during Raw, Chris Jericho got into a heated argument with his best friend Kevin Owens. Jericho blamed Owens for using "The List of Jericho" as a weapon, whereas Owens explained that he tried to save Jericho from being eliminated. The two finally agreed that Roman Reigns and Seth Rollins were at fault for Team Raw's loss. Rollins then demanded a title shot for Owens's WWE Universal Championship, as he was guaranteed a match for being part of Team Raw. Mick Foley then scheduled Owens to defend the title in the main event against Rollins in a no disqualification match, with Reigns and Jericho banned from ringside. The match ended when Jericho, disguised as a masked fan, interfered, allowing Owens to capitalize and retain the championship. The following week, the friendship between Owens and Jericho was strained further, when Owens stated he did not need Jericho's help against the challenge of Roman Reigns. Reigns then defeated Owens to earn a title match for the Universal Championship at Roadblock: End of the Line.

Also on Raw, Charlotte justified her attack on Bayley, stating she no longer had to be her teammate after the match. She was then confronted by Sasha Banks, who invoked her championship rematch clause. Charlotte agreed, but insisted that the match would take place the following week, in her own hometown. The next week, the match initially ended in a double countout. Afterwards, General Manager Mick Foley restarted the match later that night as a Falls Count Anywhere match, where Banks defeated Charlotte for her third Raw Women's Championship. On the December 5 episode, Banks challenged Charlotte to an Iron Woman match for the title at Roadblock: End of the Line, which was made official later that night.

Rich Swann defeated T. J. Perkins and Noam Dar in a triple threat match to become the number one contender for the Cruiserweight Championship. On the premiere of the cruiserweight's new exclusive show, 205 Live, Swann defeated Kendrick for the championship.

=== SmackDown ===
On the following episode of SmackDown, Shane McMahon granted James Ellsworth a SmackDown contract for his dedication to the SmackDown brand. AJ Styles criticized this decision, arguing that Ellsworth should earn his contract in a ladder match. Ellsworth accepted the challenge, with both his new contract and a future opportunity at the WWE World Championship on the line. Dean Ambrose, who had been repeatedly sent out of the arena, returned during the match and helped Ellsworth defeat Styles.

The Miz confronted Daniel Bryan about retaining the Intercontinental Championship and gloated over Kalisto not winning his match. Bryan responded that the way Miz won his match humiliated SmackDown and then scheduled Miz to immediately defend the title against Kalisto. Miz won the match when Corbin distracted Kalisto. After the match, Corbin attacked Kalisto with the End of Days, while Miz's celebration was cut short by Dolph Ziggler with a Superkick. Bryan later scheduled The Miz to defend the Intercontinental Championship against Ziggler at TLC in a ladder match. As punishment for costing Kalisto two title opportunities and SmackDown the cruiserweight division, Bryan put Baron Corbin in a match against Kane. During the match, Kalisto attacked Corbin. Afterwards on Talking Smack, a chairs match between the two was scheduled for TLC.

The dissension between SmackDown's women continued backstage as Alexa Bliss demanded another match for the SmackDown Women's Championship, which Becky Lynch accepted for TLC. After Natalya blamed Lynch for her team's loss at Survivor Series, Shane blamed the entire team, especially the absence of Nikki Bella, and scheduled a match between Natalya and Lynch. The latter won the match but was attacked afterwards by Bliss. The following week, during the contract signing, Lynch attacked Bliss but was eventually put through a table by Bliss. The match between the two was made a tables match. Also backstage, Nikki Bella accused Carmella of being the one that attacked her at Survivor Series, which Carmella denied. Nikki added that regardless of who attacked her, she would settle her differences with Carmella at TLC in a no disqualification match.

After winning the Survivor Series match for SmackDown's men's team, Bray Wyatt and Randy Orton challenged American Alpha, who had just become number one contenders for the SmackDown Tag Team Championship by defeating The Hype Bros, The Ascension, Breezango, The Usos, and The Vaudevillains in a Tag Team Turmoil, to put that spot on the line. The following week, Wyatt and Orton defeated American Alpha to become the number one contenders against Heath Slater and Rhyno at TLC.

== Results ==
No.	Results	Stipulations	Times
1^{P}	T. J. Perkins, Rich Swann, and Noam Dar defeated Tony Nese, Drew Gulak, and Ariya Daivari by pinfall	Six-man tag team match	11:50
2^{P}	Kane defeated Luke Harper by pinfall	Singles match	9:10
3	Team Raw (Charlotte Flair, Bayley, Nia Jax, Alicia Fox, and Sasha Banks) (with Dana Brooke) defeated Team SmackDown (Becky Lynch, Alexa Bliss, Carmella, Naomi, and Natalya)^{a}^{1}	5-on-5 Survivor Series match	17:30
4	The Miz (c) (with Maryse) defeated Sami Zayn by pinfall	Singles match for the WWE Intercontinental Championship	14:05
5	Team Raw (Cesaro and Sheamus, Enzo Amore and Big Cass, Luke Gallows and Karl Anderson, The New Day (Big E and Kofi Kingston), and The Shining Stars (Epico and Primo)) (with Xavier Woods) defeated Team SmackDown (American Alpha (Chad Gable and Jason Jordan), Breezango (Fandango and Tyler Breeze), Heath Slater and Rhyno, The Hype Bros (Mojo Rawley and Zack Ryder), and The Usos (Jey Uso and Jimmy Uso)) ^{2}	10-on-10 Survivor Series tag team match	18:55
6	The Brian Kendrick (c) defeated Kalisto by disqualification	Singles match for the WWE Cruiserweight Championship; Had Kalisto won the title, the entire cruiserweight division would have transferred to SmackDown.	12:25
7	Team SmackDown (AJ Styles, Bray Wyatt, Dean Ambrose, Randy Orton, and Shane McMahon) (with James Ellsworth) defeated Team Raw (Braun Strowman, Chris Jericho, Kevin Owens, Roman Reigns, and Seth Rollins)^{3}	5-on-5 Survivor Series match	52:55
8	Goldberg defeated Brock Lesnar (with Paul Heyman) by pinfall	Singles match	1:26
(c) / – the champion(s) heading into the match; P / – the match was broadcast on the pre-show

^aTeam SmackDown's captain, Nikki Bella, was attacked backstage before the match, rendering her unable to compete. The team's coach, Natalya, replaced her.

=== Survivor Series matches ===
^1

Eliminated	Wrestler	Eliminated by	Method	Time
1	Carmella	Alicia Fox	Pinfall	6:25
2	Alicia Fox	Alexa Bliss	Pinfall	6:45
3	Naomi	N/A	Countout	8:21
4	Sasha Banks	Natalya	Pinfall	10:20
5	Natalya	Charlotte Flair	Pinfall	12:00
6	Nia Jax	Becky Lynch	Submission	13:40
7	Alexa Bliss	Charlotte Flair	Pinfall	14:06
8	Becky Lynch	Bayley	Pinfall	17:30
Survivor(s):	Bayley and Charlotte Flair (Team Raw)			17:30

^2

Eliminated	Wrestler	Eliminated by	Method	Time
1	Breezango	The New Day	Midnight Hour	0:42
2	The New Day	The Usos	Super kick	1:06
3	The Hype Bros	Gallows and Anderson	Magic Killer	5:07
4	The Shining Stars	American Alpha	Grand Amplitude	8:08
5	American Alpha	Gallows and Anderson	Magic Killer	10:37
6	Gallows and Anderson	Heath Slater and Rhyno	Gore	12:27
7	Heath Slater and Rhyno	Enzo and Cass	Boom- Shakalaka	12:45
8	Enzo and Cass	The Usos	Uso Splash	13:24
9	The Usos	Cesaro and Sheamus	Sharpshooter	18:55
Survivor(s):	Cesaro and Sheamus (Team Raw)			18:55

^3

Eliminated	Wrestler	Eliminated by	Method	Time
1	Dean Ambrose	Braun Strowman	Running Powerslam	16:00
2	Braun Strowman	N/A (Note: James Ellsworth was hiding under the ring while Braun Strowman attempted to re-enter. Braun was stopped from entering by Ellsworth grabbing his ankles thus resulting in a countout.)	Countout	21:30
3	Kevin Owens	N/A	Disqualification	29:30
4	Chris Jericho	Randy Orton	RKO	30:15
5	Shane McMahon	Roman Reigns (Note: McMahon kicked out but was unable to continue after injury following a spear by Reigns.)	Technical Knockout	37:05
6	AJ Styles	Seth Rollins	Pinned after Ambrose, Rollins and Reigns hit a Shield Powerbomb through the announcer table	46:00
7	Seth Rollins	Bray Wyatt	RKO	49:25
8	Roman Reigns	Bray Wyatt	Sister Abigail	52:55
Survivor(s):	The Wyatt Family (Bray Wyatt and Randy Orton) (Team SmackDown)			52:55
