= Mauro Ranallo =

Canadian sports commentator (born 1969)

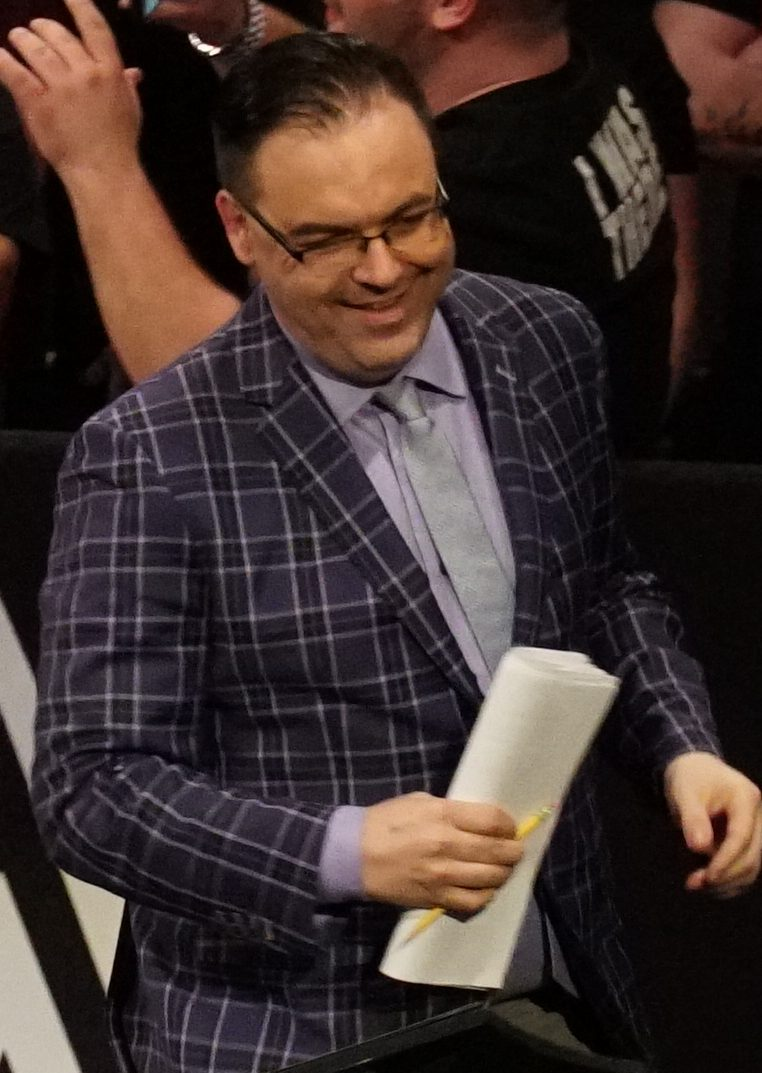
- Ranallo at NXT TakeOver: New Orleans in April 2018

Personal information
- Born: Mauro Domenico Ranallo; December 21, 1969 (age 56) Abbotsford, British Columbia, Canada
- Website: www.mauroranallo.com

Professional wrestling career
- Ring name: Mauro Ranallo
- Billed height: 5 ft 9 in (1.75 m)
- Debut: 1986

Mauro Domenico Ranallo (born December 21, 1969) is a Canadian sports announcer, commentator, and mental health advocate. He is currently signed as a play-by-play announcer with MMA organization Bellator, and also performs play-by-play duties for boxing broadcaster Showtime and professional wrestling promotion Maple Leaf Pro Wrestling (MLP). He is also known for his time with WWE on the NXT and SmackDown brands. He has experience in Canadian football, ice hockey, professional wrestling, boxing, kickboxing, and mixed martial arts events.

Ranallo is also known for his work as a commentator for Pride FC and, more recently, Showtime for Elite XC, Strikeforce, Showtime Championship Boxing, New Japan Pro-Wrestling on AXS TV, and RIZIN broadcasts. He signed with WWE as the lead SmackDown announcer in January 2016, making his debut on the brand's premier on the USA Network. He also served as announcer for the WWE Cruiserweight Classic and became part of the NXT broadcast team on June 22, 2017.

In 2015, Ranallo became the first sports broadcaster in history to call boxing, kickboxing, MMA and professional wrestling on U.S. national television.

== Early life ==
Ranallo was born in Abbotsford, British Columbia, the eldest of three sons born to an Italian couple. He has been a fan of professional wrestling since the age of five. He graduated from W. J. Mouat Secondary School in Abbotsford.

== Commentary career ==
=== Professional wrestling ===
==== Early career ====
Ranallo began his career as an announcer and manager at the age of 16, when he was offered a job with All-Star Wrestling (in Vancouver), a nationally televised wrestling show throughout Canada. After that program ended production and the promotion folded in 1989, Ranallo became a disc jockey for Abbotsford, British Columbia radio station CFVR (now CKQC-FM).

From 1999 to 2000, he served as the commentator for the Stampede Wrestling TV show in Calgary. His color-commentator was the late Bad News Allen. Ranallo was also the commentator for KVOS-TV's Top Ranked Wrestling for most of that program's run in 2005–06.

==== New Japan Pro-Wrestling (2015–2016) ====
In 2015 he returned to his pro-wrestling roots when he became the voice of New Japan Pro-Wrestling in the U.S. alongside MMA legend and former NJPW wrestler Josh Barnett.

==== WWE ====
===== SmackDown commentator (2015–2017) =====
Ranallo signed a contract with professional wrestling company WWE on December 15, 2015, and made his WWE debut as the play-by-play commentator for the SmackDown broadcast team for its premiere on USA Network on January 7, 2016, thus being dubbed "The Voice of SmackDown". Ranallo has had many commentary partners while calling SmackDown: Jerry Lawler, Byron Saxton, Michael Cole, Tom Phillips, David Otunga, and John "Bradshaw" Layfield. Additionally, Ranallo commentated the Cruiserweight Classic alongside Daniel Bryan; the tournament aired from July 6 to September 14, 2016. Ranallo continued to commentate for the cruiserweights on their weekly 205 Live show which first aired from November 29, 2016. His partners were Corey Graves and Austin Aries. For WWE pay-per-view events, Ranallo was assigned to calling the pre-show of WrestleMania 32 in April 2016, but later commentated on the main cards of several WWE PPVs: the SmackDown or cruiserweight matches on 2016's SummerSlam, Survivor Series and 2017's Royal Rumble, and SmackDown PPVs such as 2016's Backlash, No Mercy, and 2017's Elimination Chamber.

===== Absence from commentary (2017) =====
Ranallo was absent from WWE commentary beginning with the March 14, 2017 episode of SmackDown Live, including missing WrestleMania 33. WWE first claimed that Ranallo had missed a show due to travel issues associated with the March 2017 North American blizzard. When Ranallo missed another show a week later, WWE said he was ill. Ranallo reportedly missed the shows due to depression, with one alleged reason for the illness (supported by Ranallo's close friend Bas Rutten from mixed martial arts) being bullied by fellow commentator John "Bradshaw" Layfield. On WWE's Bring It To The Table show, JBL had mocked Ranallo for tweeting about winning the "Best Announcer" award from the Wrestling Observer Newsletter. On March 24, Ranallo tweeted, "I'm deeply touched by your tweets of support. My doctor wants me to stay off social media for now, but I wanted to thank you." CBSSports.com reported in April, citing an unnamed source, that Ranallo was not expected to return to WWE's television programming. WWE did not confirm this, but told CBSSports.com that Ranallo's contract was valid until August 12, 2017. WWE subsequently removed mentions of Ranallo from their social media websites, and Ranallo also removed mentions of WWE from his Twitter account. Angered WWE fans called on WWE to fire Layfield, with some even claiming they canceled their WWE Network subscriptions in protest. Ranallo's alleged treatment by Layfield as well as revelations from ring announcer Justin Roberts's autobiography resulted in a scandal for WWE because of their refusal to stop backstage harassment. On April 22, Newsweek reported that Ranallo and WWE "mutually agreed to part ways," and Ranallo released a statement in which he said his departure had "nothing to do with JBL."

===== NXT commentator (2017–2020) =====
On June 22, 2017, Ranallo announced that he would join NXT as their lead commentator after mutually coming to new terms on a new contract agreement with WWE. Although previously agreeing to mutually part ways with WWE, he was still under contract. Dave Meltzer reported that Ranallo has signed a new multi-year deal which will have him work all NXT tapings and NXT TakeOver specials. He continued to dual work for Bellator MMA as well working the British show at least whilst back on NXT. On August 31, 2020, Ranallo announced his departure from WWE on his Facebook page, which WWE subsequently confirmed on their website.

==== Impact Wrestling (2021) ====
On April 15, 2021, it was announced by FITE TV that Ranallo would be the guest commentator for Impact Wrestling's Rebellion title vs. title main event between Impact World Champion Rich Swann and AEW World Champion Kenny Omega.

==== Maple Leaf Pro Wrestling (2024–present) ====
On August 22, 2024, Ranallo was announced as "The Voice" of Maple Leaf Pro Wrestling; handling announcing, promotional vignettes, commercials and match previews.

=== Martial arts and boxing ===
In addition to wrestling, Ranallo provided commentary announcing duties for Muay Thai/Kickboxing events and King of the Cage mixed martial arts shows on TSN. He later became most prominently known among MMA fans as the voice of Pride Fighting Championships PPV broadcasts in North America from 2003 until October 2006. He was initially paired with friend, longtime-PRIDE commentator, and MMA legend Bas Rutten. After Rutten departed the broadcast, Bas was replaced by Frank Trigg. Ranallo continued to commentate on MMA as part of the EliteXC and ShoXC broadcast team from 2006 until their closure in October 2008. Ranallo continued to be the voice of MMA on Showtime by becoming the mainstay of the commentary team for Strikeforce until that organisation's acquisition and eventual merger with the Ultimate Fighting Championship in 2013. He was also the lead announcer of the Muay Thai Premier League (a global combat sports league featuring the fighting arts of Muay Thai).

Ranallo continues to work as a broadcaster for Showtime Networks, and provides commentary for three major combat sports: Showtime Championship Boxing(until its closure at the end of 2023), Glory Kickboxing, and Invicta Fighting Championships MMA.

He worked as lead commentator for MVP MMA: Rousey vs. Carano on May 16, 2026.

== Television and radio hosting career ==
In 2006, he was lead news anchor for the Canadian combat sports channel The Fight Network and featured on "Fight Network Radio" through Sirius Hardcore Sports Radio Channel 98. From January 2009 until 2011, he hosted The MMA Show weekly on The Score and the show was also available as a podcast. Ranallo was also one of three analysts on The Score's show Right After Wrestling, now called Aftermath, which airs after The Score's airing of WWE SmackDown and the replay of WWE Raw.

On March 9, 2016, in a press release, AXS TV announced that Ranallo would be joining Inside MMA as Bas Rutten's co-host starting March 25. The show ended on September 30, 2016.

== In other media ==
Ranallo appears in the 2010 documentary Bret Hart: Survival of the Hitman, where he is interviewed about Bret Hart's career.

A documentary about Ranallo entitled Bipolar Rock 'N Roller aired May 25, 2018 on Showtime. The film "explores Ranallo’s career, including his work on the two biggest pay-per-view events in television history, and his relentless pursuit of a childhood dream despite seemingly insurmountable odds" and exposes Ranallo's daily struggle living with bipolar affective disorder.

Ranallo voiced himself in the Dame vs Chavez fight from the Rocky movie Creed III.

== Personal life ==
Ranallo lives with bipolar disorder, being diagnosed at the age of 19 in 1989. The mental illness started after Ranallo's close friend Michael Janzen died aged 19 of a heart attack. In 2015, Ranallo recounted, "I would go through these unbelievable mood swings ... I never attempted suicide, but I have had suicidal thoughts ... The biggest challenge is there are many days I feel like a fraud." Additionally, Ranallo said he has "been very open about this for many, many years", and wants to be an "advocate" to end "stigma attached to mental illness".

== Awards and accomplishments ==
- CBS Sports
  - Wrestling Commentator of the Year - (NXT) (2018, 2019)
- Wrestling Observer Newsletter
  - Best Television Announcer (2015–2017)

Preceded by Rich Brennan	SmackDown Lead Announcer; 2016–2017	Succeeded by Tom Phillips
Preceded by Tom Phillips	NXT lead announcer 2017–2020	Succeeded by Vic Joseph
