= American Alpha =

Professional wrestling tag team

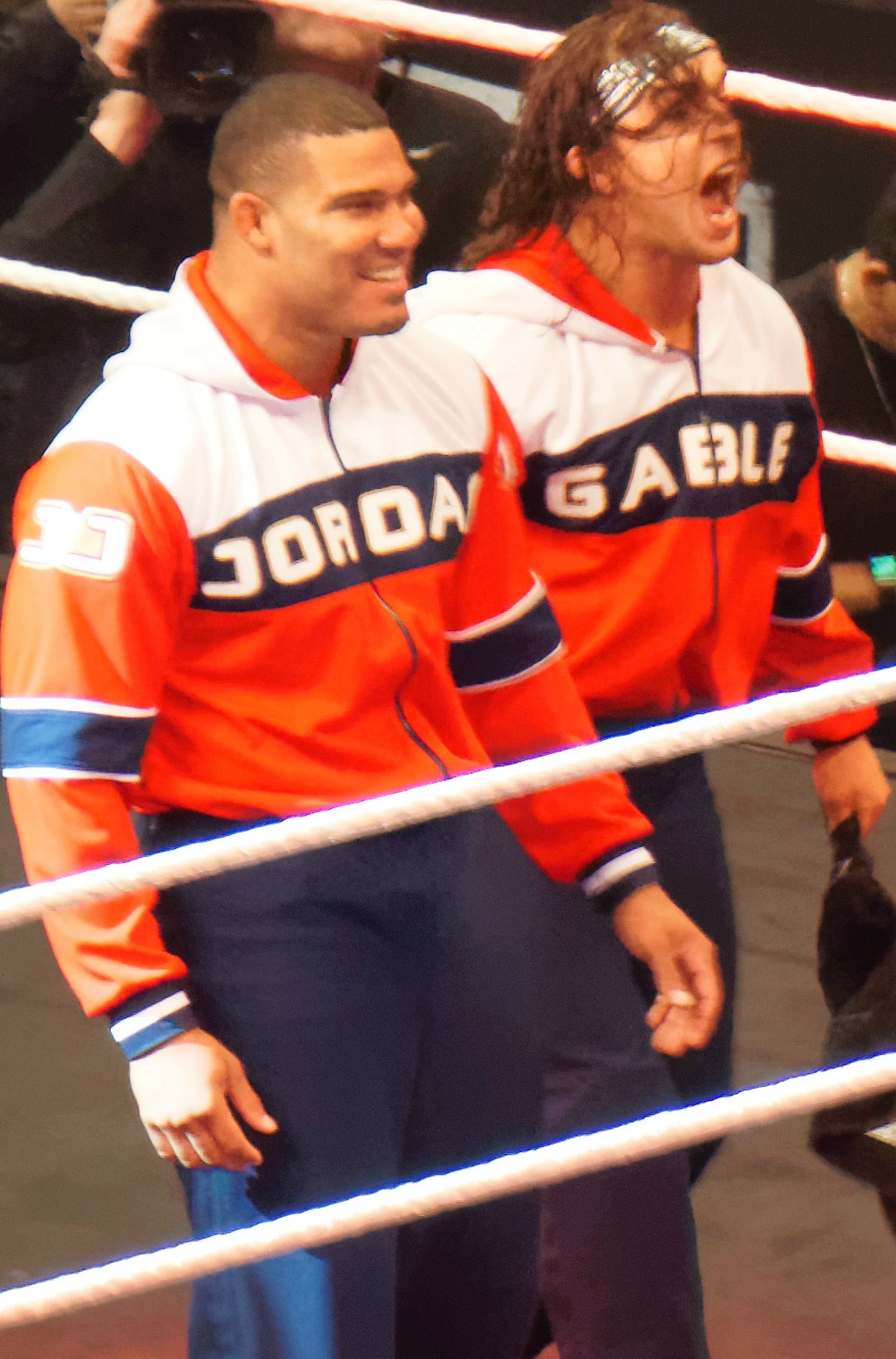
- American Alpha (Jason Jordan (left) and Chad Gable (right)) in 2016

Tag team
- Members: Chad Gable; Jason Jordan
- Name(s): Chad Gable and Jason Jordan; American Alpha
- Billed heights: Gable: 5 ft 8 in (1.73 m); Jordan: 6 ft 3 in (1.91 m)
- Combined billed weight: 447 lb (203 kg)
- Debut: July 15, 2015
- Disbanded: July 17, 2017
- Years active: 2015–2017

American Alpha was a professional wrestling tag team in WWE, composed of Chad Gable and Jason Jordan. The team was formed in May 2015 on WWE's developmental brand NXT. They held the NXT Tag Team Championship once before being promoted to the SmackDown brand in July 2016, where they also held the SmackDown Tag Team Championship once. The team disbanded in July 2017 following Jordan’s transfer to the Raw brand.

== History ==
=== NXT Tag Team Champions (2015–2016) ===
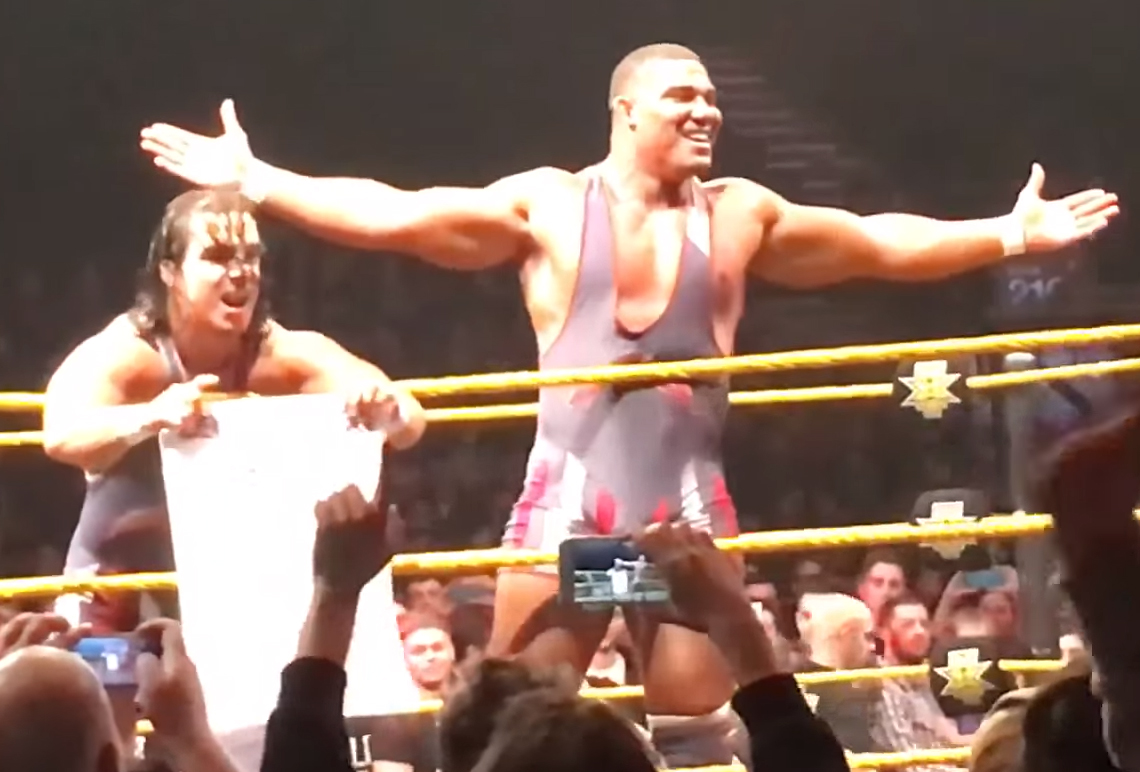
American Alpha in March 2016

Nathan Everhart signed with WWE in 2011 and was assigned to its developmental territory, Florida Championship Wrestling (FCW), where he performed under the ring name Jason Jordan. After FCW was rebranded as NXT in 2012, Charles Betts joined WWE in 2013 and performed there under the ring name Chad Gable.

Starting in May 2015, Gable began a storyline with Jordan, in which he tried to convince Jordan to form a new partnership, following the dissolution of Jordan's team with Tye Dillinger. After nearly two months of coaxing, Jordan finally agreed to a tag team match with Gable as his teammate. On the July 15 episode of NXT, Gable and Jordan were successful in their official debut together against the team of Elias Samson and Steve Cutler. On September 2, Gable and Jordan competed in the first round of the Dusty Rhodes Tag Team Classic tournament, beating the team of Neville and Solomon Crowe. After defeating the Hype Bros, they would get eliminated from the tournament by the team of Baron Corbin and Rhyno. Originally a heel tag team, their fighting spirit, and resiliency against their larger opponents won them many fans and began a gradual babyface turn for the pair. On the November 18 episode of NXT, Gable and Jordan would call out main roster tag team The Ascension and defeat them. On the December 2 episode of NXT, Gable and Jordan would face another pair of former NXT Tag Team Champions the Vaudevillains and defeat them as well. At NXT TakeOver: London, Gable and Jordan were successful in a fatal-four-way tag team match which was taped for the December 23 episode of NXT. On the January 8 tapings of NXT, the team of Gable and Jordan began using the name American Alpha.

American Alpha squared off with Blake and Murphy on two separate occasions on the January 27 and February 24 episode's tapings, where they were successful both times, as well as teaming with Enzo Amore and Colin Cassady against them and Dash and Dawson on the February 17 episode, where they victoriously emerged.

American Alpha faced off with the Vaudevillains on the March 16 episode of NXT in a number one contender's match where they emerged victorious, earning them an NXT Tag Team Championship match against Dash and Dawson, now called "The Revival", at NXT TakeOver: Dallas. The pair won the NXT Tag Team Championship at the event. They defeated the Vaudevillains on the April 20 episode of NXT. On June 8 at NXT TakeOver: The End, American Alpha lost the titles back to The Revival, ending their reign at 68 days. After the match, they were assaulted by the debuting Authors of Pain (Akam and Rezar), who were managed by legendary manager, Paul Ellering.

The pair subsequently failed to win back the NXT Tag Team Championship after being defeated by the Revival in a two out of three falls match on the July 6th episode of NXT before wrestling their final match on the brand on July 20, where they were defeated by the Authors of Pain.

=== SmackDown Tag Team Champions (2016–2017) ===
In the 2016 WWE draft, American Alpha was promoted to the SmackDown brand, making their debut on the August 2 episode of SmackDown Live with a victory over the Vaudevillains. On September 6, the duo defeated the Usos in the semifinals of the inaugural SmackDown Tag Team Championship tournament; however, a post-match attack by the Usos resulted in a storyline knee injury to Gable, forcing American Alpha to withdraw from the tournament finals. They represented Team SmackDown at Survivor Series on November 20, where they were defeated in a 10-on-10 tag team elimination match. On the December 27 episode of SmackDown Live, American Alpha captured the SmackDown Tag Team Championship from the Wyatt Family in a four-way tag team elimination match.

After defeating the Wyatt Family in a rematch to retain their titles on January 10, the pair would go on to defend their titles in a tag team turmoil match at Elimination Chamber successfully against The Ascension, Usos, Vaudevillians, Breezango and Heath Slater & Rhyno, entering fourth and eliminating the Usos and Ascension, despite an attack by the Usos after their elimination, continuing their feud. American Alpha would defeat the Ascension on the following SmackDown in a rematch and then Breezango the week after, being confronted by the Usos after both matches.

On the March 21st episode of SmackDown Live, American Alpha lost the SmackDown Tag Team Championships to The Usos after suffering a non-title match loss to the pair the prior week. After making their Wrestlemania debut at WrestleMania 33 where both were unsuccessful in winning the Andre the Giant Memorial Battle Royal they failed in their championship rematch to the Usos, being attacked by Primo and Epico afterwards, who defeated them the following week. American Alpha got revenge by defeating the duo the following week in a beat the clock challenge match, although their time was beaten by Breezango (Fandango and Tyler Breeze). This was their last televised match as a tag team.

=== Separation and aftermath ===
In June 2017, Gable began performing as a singles competitor on the SmackDown brand. On the July 17 episode of Raw, Jordan was revealed as the illegitimate son of Kurt Angle in a scripted storyline and was subsequently moved to the Raw brand, effectively disbanding the team. Jordan then retired from in-ring competition following a neck injury in 2018; he has since served as a backstage producer for WWE. As of 2026, Gable remains an active in-ring performer for the company.

== Other media ==
American Alpha made their video game debut as playable characters in WWE 2K17 and they later appeared in WWE 2K18.

== Championships and accomplishments ==
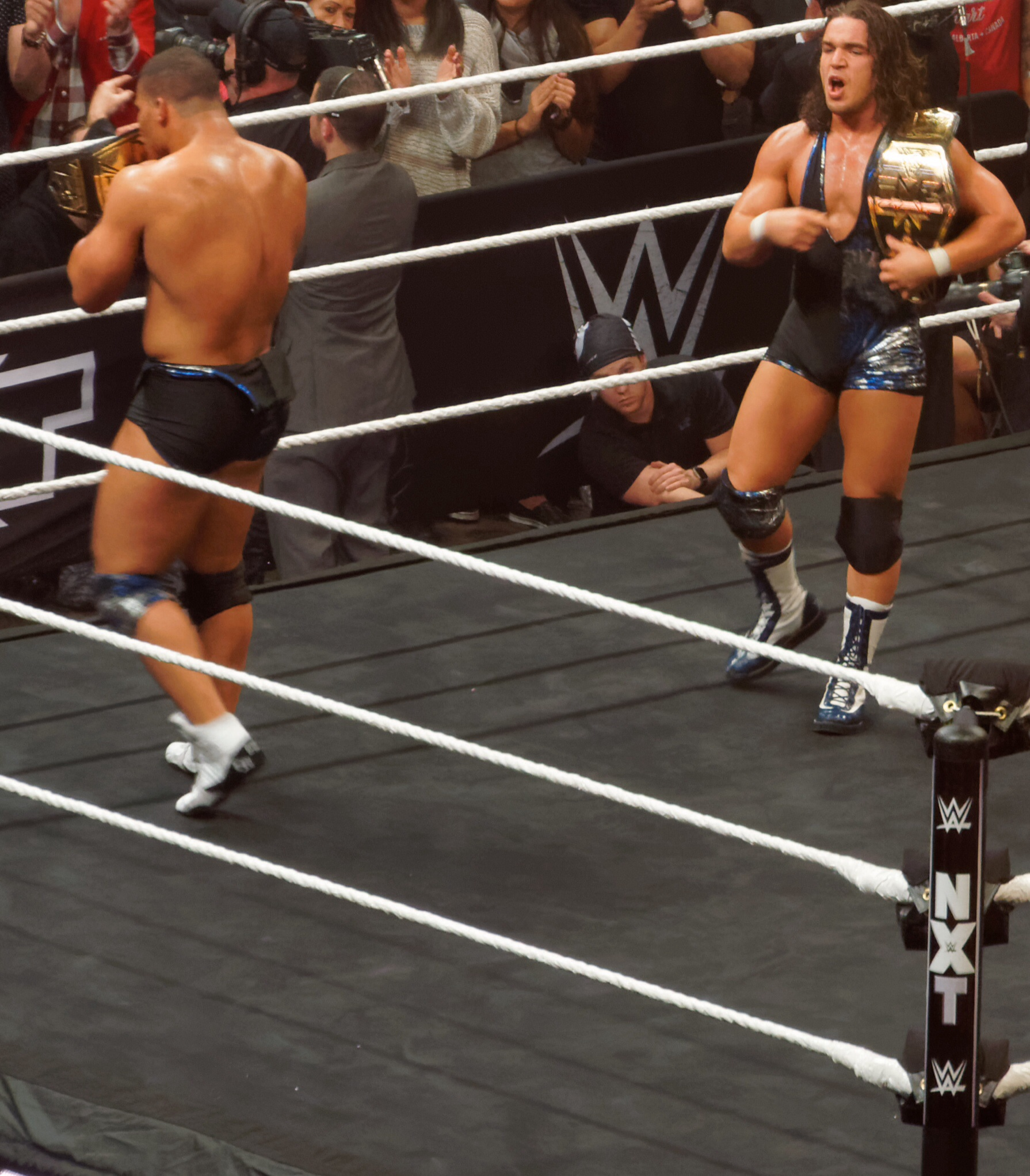
American Alpha is a former one-time NXT Tag Team Champion

- Pro Wrestling Illustrated
  - PWI ranked Jordan #103 of the top 500 singles wrestlers in the PWI 500 in 2017
  - PWI ranked Gable #104 of the top 500 singles wrestlers in the PWI 500 in 2017
- Wrestling Observer Newsletter
  - Rookie of the Year (2015) – Gable
- WWE
  - WWE SmackDown Tag Team Championship (1 time)
  - NXT Tag Team Championship (1 time)
