= Jason Ayers =

American professional wrestling referee

Personal information
- Born: Jason Marc Ayers; January 13, 1982 (age 44) Havelock, North Carolina, U.S.

Professional wrestling career
- Ring name(s): Jason Ayers; Jason Harding
- Billed height: 5 ft 9 in (1.75 m)
- Billed weight: 170 lb (77 kg)
- Debut: 1998

Jason Marc Ayers (born January 13, 1982) is an American professional wrestling referee. He is currently signed to WWE where he referees matches on WWE SmackDown. He also produces NXT.

== Professional wrestling career ==
=== Early career (1998–2012) ===
Ayers started refereeing independent wrestling matches in 1998, with Hoosier Pro Wrestling in Columbus, Indiana, under the name Jason Harding. He also refereed for DREAMWAVE Wrestling, AAW, and many other organizations throughout the Midwest.

Ayers began as a referee for Ring of Honor in May 2005 at Nowhere to Run, officiating the match between James Gibson and B. J. Whitmer. Ayers left Ring of Honor in September 2007. In July 2006, Ayers made his Japanese debut with Dragon Gate Pro Wrestling during their WrestleJAM tour. The tour featured several Ring of Honor stars, including Austin Aries, Matt Sydal, and more. After leaving ROH in 2007, Jason toured nationally with Micro Wrestling Federation.

In January 2010, Jason began with both Dragon Gate USA and Evolve, refereeing the Davey Richards vs Kota Ibushi main event at the debut EVOLVE event. He traveled with both companies, serving as head referee on all events until November 2011.

=== WWE (2012–present) ===
In February 2012, Ayers signed a contract with WWE, and started in Florida Championship Wrestling in early March. In mid-2012, FCW was rebranded as NXT, and Ayers became head referee shortly thereafter.

Ayers refereed the finals of the NXT Tag Team Championship tournament, crowning the first champions, Adrian Neville and Oliver Grey on January 31, 2013. On May 2, Ayers refereed the match between Luke Harper and Erick Rowan vs Neville and Bo Dallas where Harper and Rowan became NXT Tag Team Champions. Ayers debuted on Raw on August 6, refereeing the match between Kaitlyn and Layla.

In his time with WWE, Jason has refereed at Wrestlemanias XXX, 31, 32, 33, and 34. Ayers was also the official for Arrow star Stephen Amell's WWE debut match at Summerslam 2015, as he teamed with Neville to face Stardust and King Barrett.

With the WWE Brand Extension that took place in July 2016, Ayers became a SmackDown Live exclusive official, officiating the WWE Intercontinental Championship title-vs-career match between Dolph Ziggler and The Miz at 2016's No Mercy event as well as the WWE SmackDown Women's Championship Six-Pack Challenge at WrestleMania 33. At WrestleMania 34, he refereed the SmackDown Women's Championship match between Charlotte Flair and Asuka. He was also one of the referees assigned to the inaugural cruiserweight classic and became an official on the 205 Live roster.
