= Vaudevillains =

Disbanded Professional wrestling tag team

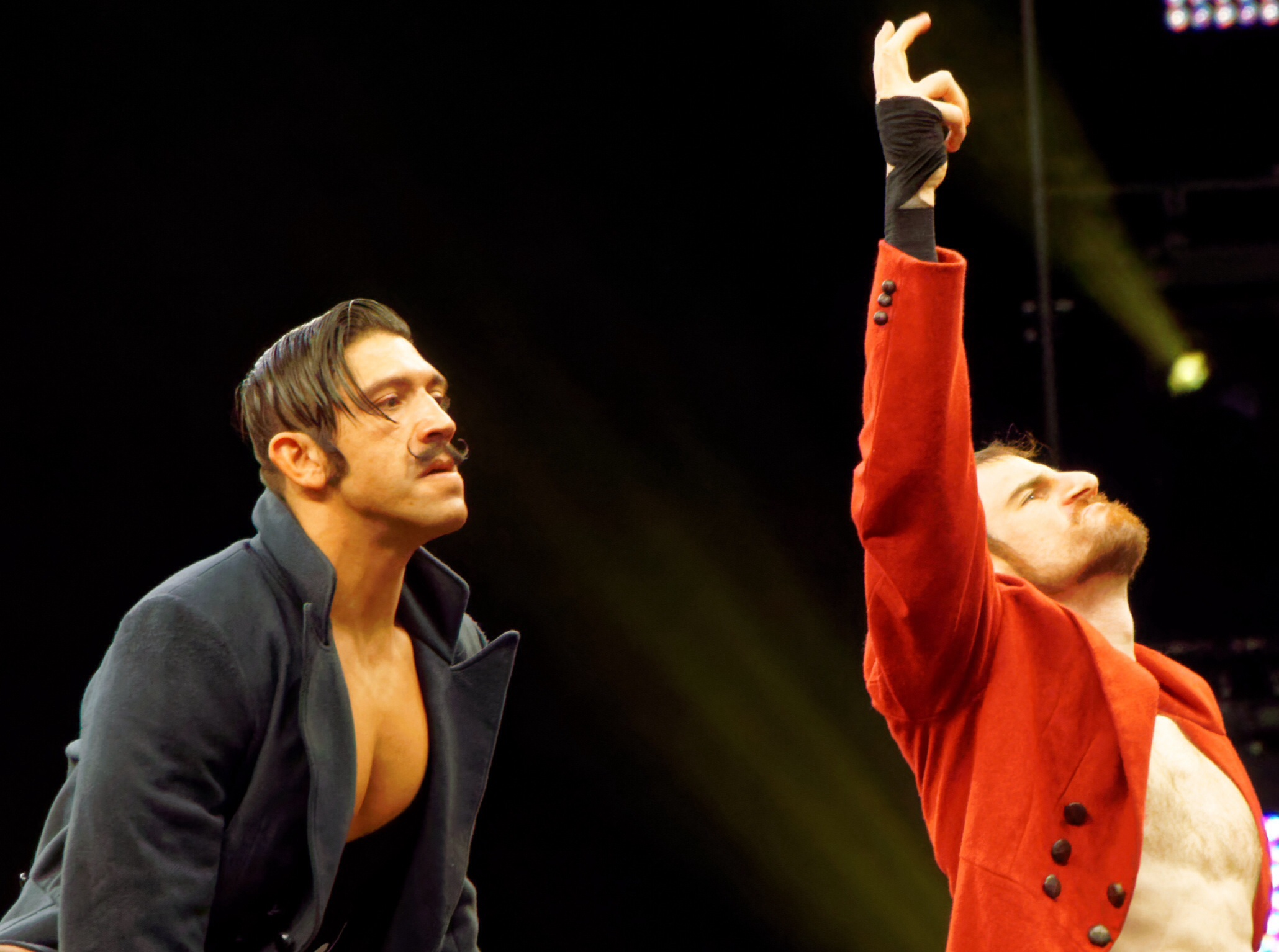
- Aiden English (right) and Simon Gotch (left)

Tag team
- Name: The Vaudevillains
- Members: Aiden English; Simon Gotch
- Billed heights: Aiden English: 6 ft 3 in (1.91 m); Simon Gotch: 6 ft 1 in (1.85 m)
- Combined billed weight: 435 lb (197 kg)
- Debut: June 19, 2014
- Years active: 2014–2017; 2023

The Vaudevillains were an American professional wrestling tag team in WWE, composed of Aiden English and Simon Gotch. Their gimmick was a pair of Vaudeville-era throwbacks. They also formerly wrestled in WWE's developmental territory NXT, where they were one-time NXT Tag Team Champions.

== History ==
=== NXT (2014–2016) ===
In June 2014, English formed a tag team with Simon Gotch, known as The Vaudevillains. The Vaudevillains made their in-ring debut as a team of villains on the June 19 episode, defeating Angelo Dawkins and Travis Tyler. In August, The Vaudevillains participated in a tournament to determine the number one contenders to the NXT Tag Team Championship, losing to the Lucha Dragons (Sin Cara and Kalisto) in the final. On the October 30 episode of NXT, The Vaudevillains won a tag team battle royal to become the #1 contenders to the NXT Tag Team Championship. They received their title match at NXT TakeOver: R Evolution against The Lucha Dragons, but were unsuccessful. After a brief hiatus, The Vaudevillains returned on the June 3, 2015 episode of NXT, defeating the team Jason Jordan and Marcus Louis. On the July 8 episode of NXT, The Vaudevillains defeated Enzo Amore and Colin Cassady to become the #1 contenders to the NXT Tag Team Championships. On July 15, Blake and Murphy defeated The Vaudevillains to retain their championships after Alexa Bliss interfered. Afterwards, Bliss insulted and slapped them both, turning them good in the process. General Manager William Regal then announced that there would be a rematch at a later date. At NXT TakeOver:Brooklyn, The Vaudevillains (with Blue Pants in their corner) defeated Blake and Murphy (with Alexa Bliss) to become NXT Tag Team Champions for the first time. The Vaudevillains were eliminated in the second round of the Dusty Rhodes Tag Team Classic by Dash and Dawson, setting up a future championship match. On November 11, The Vaudevillains lost their titles to Dash and Dawson, ending their reign at 61 days. The pair later failed to regain the titles on the November 25th episode of NXT. The duo once again turned villain after a losing streak continued with a loss to American Alpha when they refused to shake hands with the two, showing a lack of sportsmanship. They would later compete against the duo on the March 21st episode of NXT in a #1 contender's match for the NXT Tag Team titles where they would lose again. They made their final NXT appearance on the 13 April episode of NXT, losing to Johnny Gargano and Tommaso Ciampa.

=== Main roster (2016–2017) ===
On the April 7, 2016 episode of SmackDown, The Vaudevillains made their main roster debut as villains, defeating The Lucha Dragons. On the April 11 episode of Raw, The Vaudevillains were announced as one of the teams to participate in the #1 contender's tournament for the WWE Tag Team Championship, where they defeated Goldango (Goldust and Fandango) in the first round later that week on SmackDown and The Usos on the April 18 episode of Raw in the semi-finals. At Payback, The Vaudevillains faced Enzo Amore and Big Cass in the finals of the tournament. The match resulted in a no-contest due to Amore suffering a legitimate concussion, and The Vaudevillains were declared the #1 contenders. At Extreme Rules, The Vaudevillains received their shot at the titles against The New Day in a losing effort, marking their first defeat. At Money in the Bank, The Vaudevillains would receive another shot at the titles, competing against The New Day, Enzo and Big Cass, and Luke Gallows and Karl Anderson in a fatal-four-way match in a losing effort after Kingston pinned English.

On July 19 at the 2016 WWE Draft, The Vaudevillains were drafted to SmackDown in the tenth round of picks. In August, a tag team tournament for the newly created SmackDown Tag Team Championship was set up by SmackDown general manager Daniel Bryan and SmackDown commissioner Shane McMahon, where the winner of the tournament would be crowned the inaugural champions. On the August 30 episode of SmackDown, The Vaudevillains would compete in the first round match of the tournament, where they were defeated by The Hype Bros. On the November 8 episode of SmackDown, They were defeated by Breezango (Tyler Breeze and Fandango) in a qualifying match for a spot on Team SmackDown at Survivor Series.

On the January 31, 2017 episode of SmackDown, The Vaudevillains, along with five other teams, answered an open challenge set by American Alpha, where a brawl between all six teams ensued before being broken up by referees and officials. The following week on SmackDown, The Vaudevillains, teaming with The Usos and The Ascension, defeated American Alpha, Breezango, and Heath Slater and Rhyno in a twelve-man tag team match. At Elimination Chamber, The Vaudevillains competed in a tag team turmoil match for the SmackDown Tag Team Championship, but were eliminated by Heath Slater and Rhyno.

The Vaudevillains then competed in the André the Giant Memorial Battle Royal on the WrestleMania 33 pre-show on April 2, 2017, but both were eliminated from the match. This would be their last match together, as just three days later on April 5, 2017, it was announced that Gotch had been released by WWE, effectively disbanding The Vaudevillains.

=== Independent circuit (2023) ===
On July 24, 2023, Gotch and English confirmed they would reunite as a tag team, having their first match in over six years for House of Glory Wrestling on September 15, 2023.

== Championships and accomplishments ==
- Pro Wrestling Illustrated
  - PWI ranked English #171 of the top 500 singles wrestlers in the PWI 500 in 2016
  - PWI ranked Gotch #175 of the top 500 singles wrestlers in the PWI 500 in 2016
- WWE
  - NXT Tag Team Championship (1 time)
  - WWE Tag Team Championship #1 Contender's Tournament (2016)
