= Hype Bros =

Professional wrestling tag team in WWE

The Hype Bros

Tag team
- Members: Mojo Rawley; Zack Ryder
- Combined billed weight: 489 lb (222 kg)
- Debut: June 10, 2015
- Years active: 2015–2017

The Hype Bros were a tag team in WWE consisting of Mojo Rawley and Zack Ryder. Active from 2015 to 2017, the team originally performed in the NXT developmental system before appearing on SmackDown following the 2016 brand extension.

== History ==
On the June 10, 2015, episode of NXT, Rawley and Ryder had their first match as a tag team. The Hype Bros participated in the 2015 Dusty Rhodes Tag Team Classic, but were eliminated in the quarterfinals.

During the WWE brand extension in July 2016, both Rawley and Ryder were drafted separately to the SmackDown roster. At Battleground, Rawley saved Ryder from a post-match beating by WWE United States Champion Rusev, officially uniting the Hype Bros on the main roster. The Hype Bros entered the WWE SmackDown Tag Team Championship tournament, defeating The Vaudevillains in the first round before losing to Heath Slater and Rhyno in the semi-finals. On the October 25 episode of SmackDown, The Hype Bros defeated The Ascension to qualify as part of Team SmackDown for the 10–on–10 Survivor Series Tag Team Elimination match at Survivor Series in a losing effort. The Hype Bros were eliminated earlier within 5 minutes when Ryder was pinned following a Magic Killer from Gallows and Anderson.

On the December 13 episode of SmackDown, The Hype Bros competed in a tag-team battle royal to determine the #1 contenders for the WWE SmackDown Tag Team Championship. Despite Rawley being eliminated, Ryder would go on to win the battle royal for his team and become the #1 contenders. However, during the match, Ryder injured his knee and was seen using crutches backstage. It was later reported that Ryder would be out of action for 4–9 months.

After six months of inactivity, Ryder returned on the June 13 episode of SmackDown, reuniting with Rawley. The Hype Bros would have an opportunity to become number one contenders for the SmackDown Tag Team championship at the June 27 episode of SmackDown in a match against champions The Usos, in which they were defeated.

Throughout the next few weeks on SmackDown, Ryder and Rawley would shown signs of dissension as Rawley would constantly tag himself into matches, which ultimately caused them to lose when they began arguing. On the October 10 episode of SmackDown, The Hype Bros faced Benjamin and Gable, Breezango (Tyler Breeze and Fandango), and The Ascension (Konnor and Viktor) in a fatal four-way match to determine the number one contenders for The Usos' SmackDown Tag Team Championship, in which The Hype Bros were unable to win.

On the November 28 episode of SmackDown, after losing a tag team match to The Bludgeon Brothers, Rawley attacked Ryder, thus turning heel and disbanding The Hype Bros. They faced each other on Clash of Champions pre-show, with Rawley coming out victorious. The two then faced each other in the United States championship tournament with Rawley being victorious.
