= The B-Team =

Professional wrestling tag team

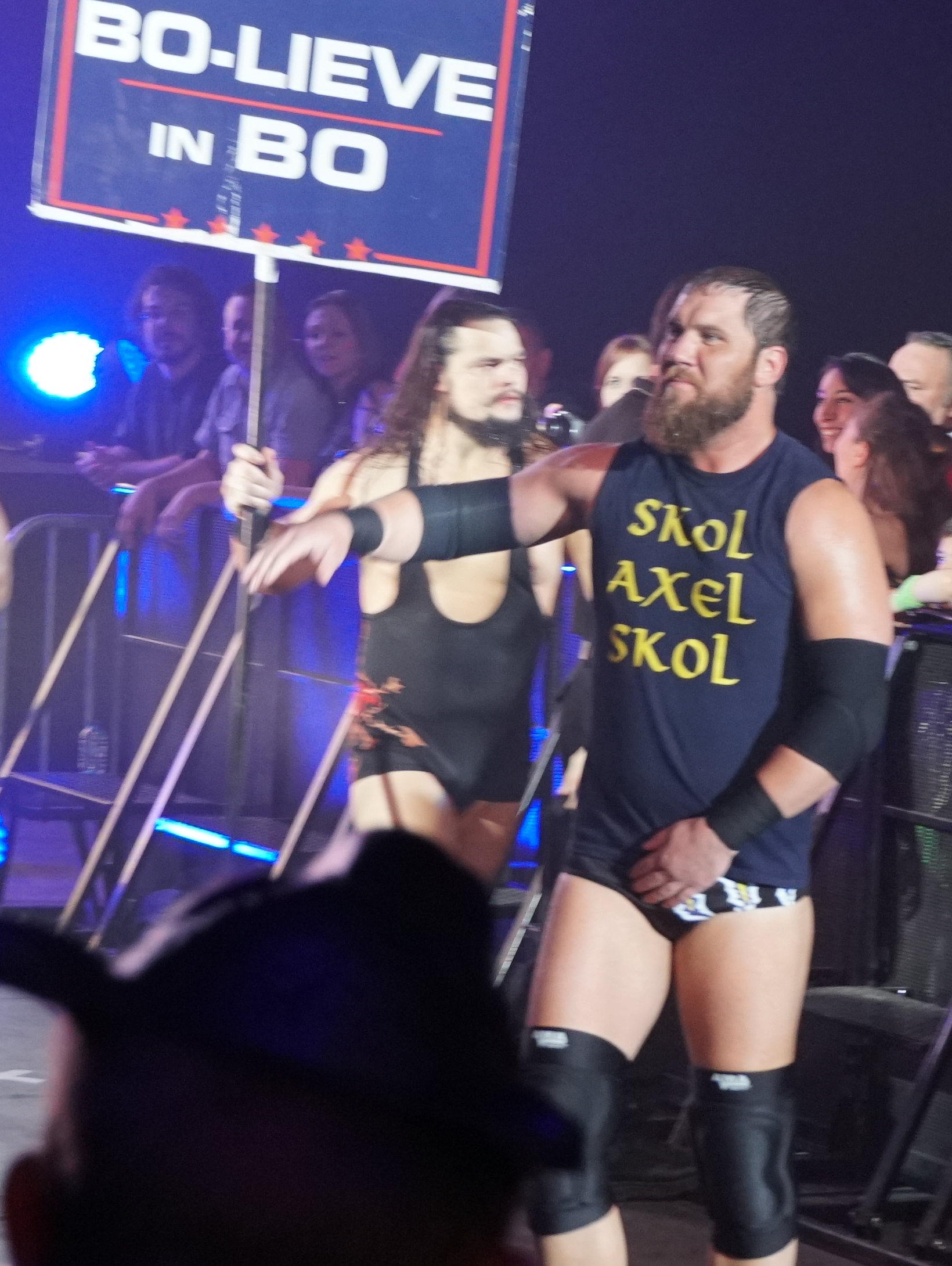
- The B-Team (Bo Dallas (left) and Curtis Axel (right)) in May 2017

Tag team
- Members: Bo Dallas; Curtis Axel
- Names: Bo Dallas and Curtis Axel; The B-Team; The Miztourage; The Social Outcasts
- Billed heights: Dallas: 6 ft 1 in (1.85 m); Axel: 6 ft 3 in (1.91 m)
- Combined billed weight: 462 lb (210 kg); (Dallas: 234 lb, Axel: 228 lb)
- Debut: January 9, 2013
- Disbanded: April 30, 2020
- Years active: 2013; 2016; 2017–2020

The B-Team was a professional wrestling tag team in WWE, composed of Bo Dallas & Curtis Axel. The team are former one-time WWE Raw Tag Team Champions. They also formerly performed as The Miztourage from 2017 to 2018 before becoming The B-Team.

== History ==
=== Formation and early years (2013–2018) ===
On January 2, 2013, episode of NXT, Michael McGillicutty turned face by saving Bo Dallas from a beating at the hands of Primo and Epico. On the next episode of NXT, Dallas and McGillicutty lost to Primo and Epico, though Dallas and McGillicutty would gain revenge when they defeated Primo and Epico in the first round of the NXT Tag Team Championship tournament to crown the inaugural champions on the January 30 episode of NXT. On the February 6 episode of NXT, Dallas and McGillicutty were eliminated in the semi-finals, when they lost to The Wyatt Family (Luke Harper and Erick Rowan) due to interference of Bray Wyatt. After that, they had parted ways as Dallas went in a feud for the NXT Championship and McGillicutty returned to the main roster with a new ring name, Curtis Axel.

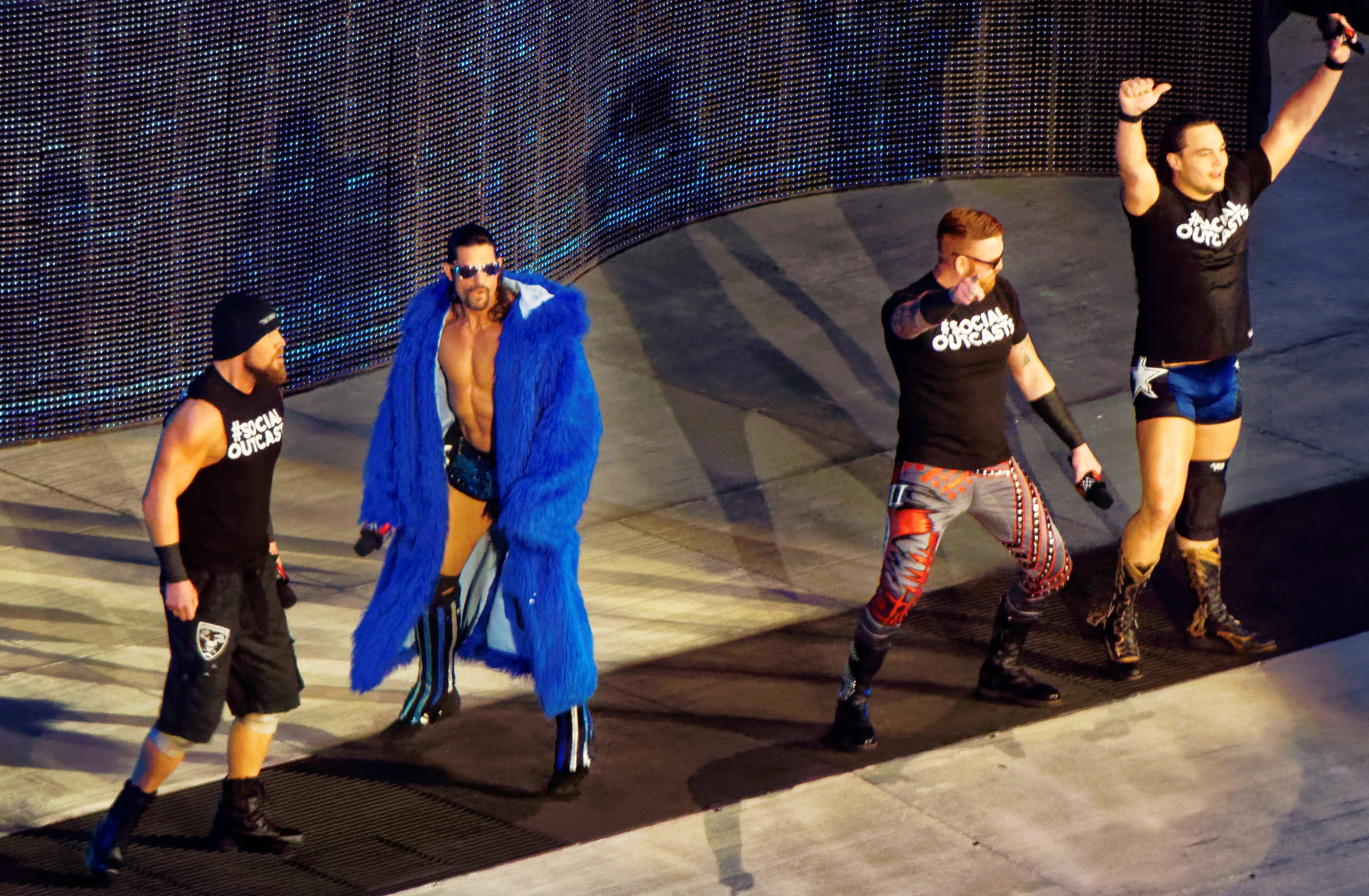
The Social Outcasts (from left to right: Curtis Axel, Adam Rose, Heath Slater, and Bo Dallas) in April 2016

Three years later, on the January 4, 2016 episode of Raw, Adam Rose, Bo Dallas, Curtis Axel, and Heath Slater debuted a new villainous stable and assisted Slater in defeating Dolph Ziggler, calling themselves "The Social Outcasts". On February 21, at Fastlane, Axel defeated R-Truth, with interference from fellow The Social Outcasts members. At WrestleMania 32, all of them competed in the André the Giant Memorial Battle Royal, which was won by Baron Corbin. In May, The Social Outcasts began filming The Marine 5: Battleground, taking them out of action. During this time, Rose was released from his WWE contract and The Social Outcasts returned minus Rose on the June 27 episode of Raw, confronting Enzo Amore and Big Cass, but lost to them the following week on Raw. At the 2016 WWE draft, Dallas and Axel were drafted to the Raw brand while Slater went undrafted, ending the stable. After the draft, Dallas and Axel continued as allies until the October 17 episode of Raw, where Dallas attacked Axel. The following week on Raw, Dallas defeated Axel by pinning him while grabbing Axel's tights.

On the June 19, 2017 episode of Raw, Intercontinental Champion The Miz approached Dallas and Axel, offering to make them "the stars [they] deserve to be" if they become his entourage, and later that night, Dallas and Axel appeared in bear costumes during an in ring segment between Miz and his wife Maryse, attacking Dean Ambrose. Dallas and Axel, now dubbed "The Miztourage", began helping Miz in his matches and occasionally teamed him with him, including winning efforts against Dean Ambrose, Heath Slater, and Rhyno on June 26 episode of Raw and Jason Jordan and The Hardy Boyz (Jeff Hardy and Matt Hardy) at SummerSlam. At No Mercy, they helped Miz to defeat Jason Jordan to retain his title. At WrestleMania 34 on April 8, 2018, they participated in the André the Giant Memorial Battle Royal but both of them failed to win the match. As part of the Superstar Shake-Up, Miz was moved to the SmackDown brand, while Dallas and Axel remained on the Raw brand. On the April 16 episode of Raw, during a tag team match, Dallas and Axel turned on Miz, ending their alliance.

=== Raw Tag Team Champions (2018–2020) ===
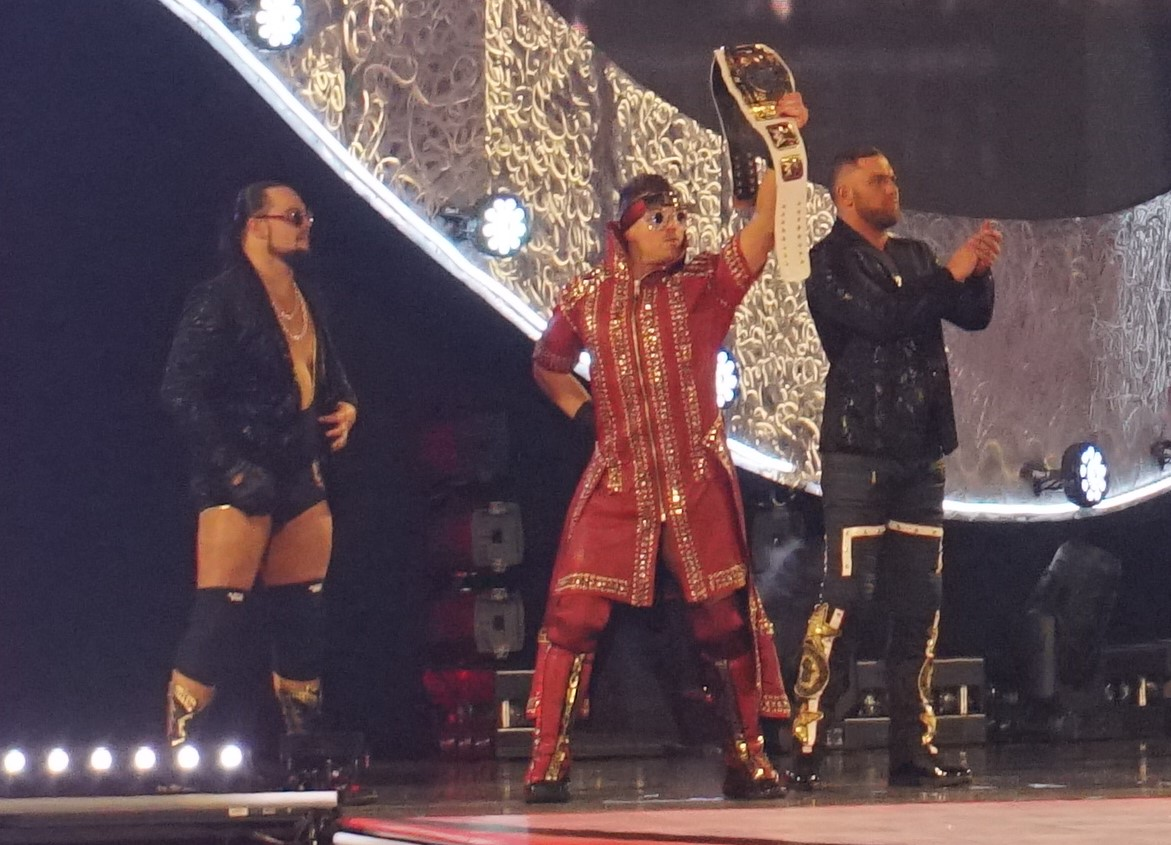
Dallas (left) and Axel (right) with The Miz (middle) at WrestleMania 34

On the May 14 episode of Raw, the duo adopted the new team name "The B-Team" and defeated Breezango (Tyler Breeze and Fandango), their first win as a team since August 2017. On the June 4 episode of Raw, The B-Team won a tag team battle royal to determine the number one contenders for the Raw Tag Team Championships. At Extreme Rules, The B-Team defeated The Deleters of Worlds (Bray Wyatt and Matt Hardy) to win the Raw Tag Team Championship. On the July 23 episode of Raw, they successfully retained their title against The Deleters of Worlds. In the following weeks, The B-Team transitioned into faces, adopting a new entrance theme and mannerisms, while also disassociating with The Miz at Summerslam. Also at SummerSlam on August 19, The B-Team successfully retained their title against The Revival (Dash Wilder and Scott Dawson). On the September 3 episode of Raw, The B-Team lost the championships to Dolph Ziggler and Drew McIntyre, ending their reign at 50 days. The following week on Raw, they received a rematch for the titles, but they were unsuccessful.

At Survivor Series, The B-Team made up part of Team Raw as they took on Team SmackDown in a 10-on-10 Survivor Series tag team elimination match and Team Raw would go on to lose the match. At WrestleMania 35 on April 7, 2019, they competed in the André the Giant Memorial Battle Royal, again failing to win the match. As part of the Superstar Shake-up, both Dallas and Axel were moved to the SmackDown brand. On the April 30 episode of SmackDown, The B-Team formed a brief alliance with Shane McMahon, thus turning heel once again. On the September 3 episode of SmackDown, Dallas became the WWE 24/7 Champion by pinning Drake Maverick on the backstage area thanks to the help of Axel, only to lose it to Maverick again some minutes later. The B-Team's final televised match was at Crown Jewel on October 31, where they failed to win the tag team turmoil match. On the November 15 episode of SmackDown, Dallas and Axel were attacked by Braun Strowman, this would the team's final appearance in WWE.

In December, Dallas asked WWE for time off, which was granted and he also suffered a neck injury which prevented him from working in the ring. On the February 28, 2020 episode of SmackDown, Axel was defeated by Daniel Bryan, in what would be his final appearance in WWE. The team disbanded on April 30, 2020 as Axel was released from his WWE contract due to budget cuts stemming from the COVID-19 pandemic and Dallas was also released on April 15, 2021, after over a year of absence; but Axel was rehired for a brief period in 2022 while Dallas returned to the company that same year in which he was then repackaged as Uncle Howdy, who then became part of The Wyatt Sicks stable.

== Other media ==
Although both of them had previously been featured in WWE video games, they were featured as a tag team for the first time in the video game WWE 2K19, and have further appeared as a tag team in WWE 2K20.

== Championships and accomplishments ==
- Pro Wrestling Illustrated
  - Ranked Curtis Axel No. 172 of the top 500 singles wrestlers in the PWI 500 in 2019
  - Ranked Bo Dallas No. 176 of the top 500 singles wrestlers in the PWI 500 in 2019
- WWE
  - WWE Raw Tag Team Championship (1 time)
  - WWE 24/7 Championship (1 time) – Bo Dallas
