= Curtis Axel =

American professional wrestler (born 1979)

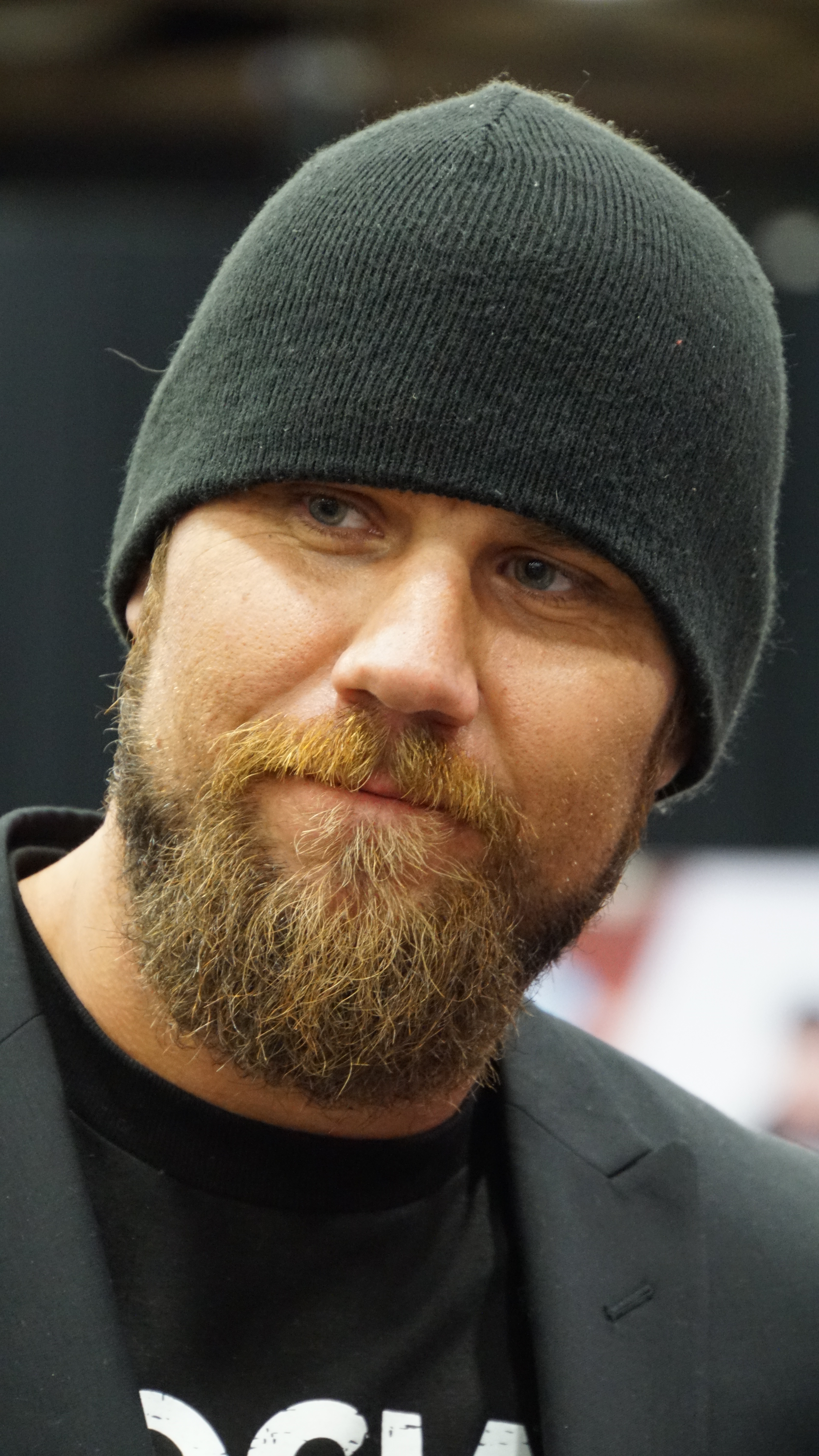
- Axel in 2016

Personal information
- Born: Joseph Curtis Hennig; October 1, 1979 (age 47) Champlin, Minnesota, U.S.
- Education: North Hennepin Community College
- Spouse: Brooke Hennig (m. 2004)
- Children: 3
- Parent: Curt Hennig (father)
- Relative: Larry Hennig (grandfather)

Professional wrestling career
- Ring name(s): Curtis Axel; Joe Hennig; Michael McGillicutty
- Billed height: 6 ft 3 in (191 cm)
- Billed weight: 228 lb (103 kg)
- Billed from: Minneapolis, Minnesota; Champlin, Minnesota
- Trained by: Curt Hennig; Harley Race; Brad Rheingans
- Debut: July 13, 2007

Joseph Curtis Hennig (born October 1, 1979) is an American professional wrestler. He is best known for his tenure in WWE from 2007 to 2020, where he performed under the ring name Curtis Axel.

Hennig signed with WWE in 2007 and performed under his real name, stylized as Joe Hennig, at their developmental territory Florida Championship Wrestling (FCW) and was a one-time FCW Florida Heavyweight Champion and four-time FCW Florida Tag Team Champion. In 2010, after he competed on NXT under the ring name Michael McGillicutty, he debuted on WWE's main roster as part of The Nexus. He then won the WWE Tag Team Championship with David Otunga once. In 2013, he reignited his career under the Curtis Axel ring name, paying tribute to his father "Mr. Perfect" Curt Hennig and his grandfather Larry "The Axe" Hennig and won the WWE Intercontinental Championship once. He then won the WWE Raw Tag Team Championship with Bo Dallas as part of The B-Team. He departed WWE in April 2020, and later returned to the company in April 2022 as a producer for three months.

== Early life ==
Joseph Curtis Hennig was born on October 1, 1979, in Champlin, Minnesota, the son of Leonice Hennig and professional wrestler "Mr. Perfect" Curt Hennig. He is the grandson of professional wrestler Larry "The Axe" Hennig. He has a younger brother named Hank, and two younger sisters named Katie and Amy, who is also a professional wrestler. He graduated from North Hennepin Community College with an Associates of Science degree in business computer systems and management.

== Professional wrestling career ==
=== Independent circuit (2007–2008) ===
Hennig trained under Brad Rheingans, Harley Race, and his father "Mr. Perfect" Curt Hennig. He made his professional wrestling debut on July 13, 2007, in Waterloo, Iowa, for World League Wrestling (WLW), teaming with Ted DiBiase Jr. to defeat Branden Tatum and Dinn T. Moore by disqualification. Hennig later went on a nine-month winning streak in WLW, before suffering his first singles loss to Wade Chism.

=== World Wrestling Entertainment/WWE (2007–2020) ===
==== Developmental territories (2007–2010) ====
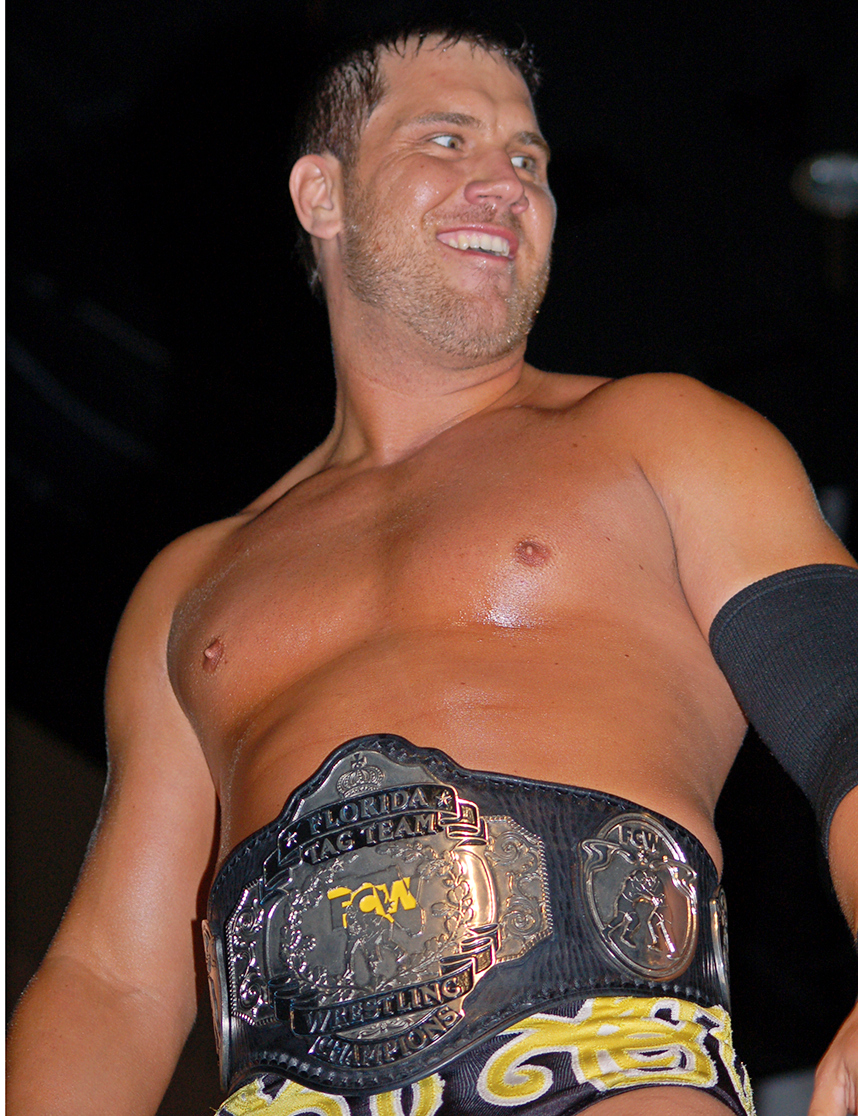
Hennig as one-half of the FCW Florida Tag Team Champions

On March 31, 2007, Hennig, along with his family, represented his father "Mr. Perfect" Curt Hennig at the WWE Hall of Fame ceremony by accepting the award on his behalf. On the October 26, 2007, episode of SmackDown, Hennig teamed with Steve Fender in a loss to Jesse and Festus.

Hennig then signed a contract with World Wrestling Entertainment (WWE) and was assigned to its developmental territory Florida Championship Wrestling (FCW). On September 11, 2008, Hennig and Sebastian Slater defeated Nic Nemeth and Gavin Spears to win the Florida Tag Team Championship. On October 30, Hennig and Slater lost the Tag Team Championship to The New Hart Foundation (DH Smith and TJ Wilson). On November 20, Hennig challenged Sheamus O'Shaunessy for the FCW Florida Heavyweight Championship, but the match ended in a double disqualification, and a rematch was made, but Hennig was again disqualified. Hennig had another chance to win the title on December 11 when he participated in a fatal four-way match for the championship, but Eric Escobar won the match. On February 26, 2009, Hennig defeated Escobar to win the FCW Florida Heavyweight Championship. On April 5, it was announced that Hennig had suffered a serious injury and therefore he had surrendered the Florida Heavyweight Championship. Hennig returned from injury and formed a tag team with Brett DiBiase, known as The Fortunate Sons. On January 14, 2010, The Fortunate Sons won the FCW Florida Tag Team Championship by defeating The Dudebusters (Caylen Croft and Trent Barreta). On March 13, The Fortunate Sons lost the championship to The Uso Brothers (Jimmy and Jules). On April 8, Hennig blamed DiBiase for the loss, and the two fought in a match to a double disqualification. At an FCW event on April 29, Hennig faced DiBiase, but DiBiase suffered a knee injury during the match, ending their storyline. On July 15, now using the ring name Michael McGillicutty, teamed with Kaval to win the FCW Florida Tag Team Championship from Los Aviadores (Epico and Hunico), becoming a four-time tag team champion. The following day, they dropped the championships back to Los Aviadores.

McGillicutty then took part in the second season of NXT, with Kofi Kingston as his pro. He made his NXT debut on the June 8 episode, but did not compete in a match. He made his in-ring debut on the following edition of NXT, teaming with Kingston to defeat Mark Henry and Lucky Cannon. In the first poll on June 29, McGillicutty was ranked third, behind Kaval and Percy Watson. On the July 20 episode of NXT, McGillicutty earned immunity from elimination in the next poll by completing an obstacle course in the fastest time. On the following episode of NXT, he moved up to first place in the second poll. After six consecutive victories, McGillicutty suffered his first loss on the August 3 episode of NXT, when he was defeated by pro The Miz. On the August 9 episode of Raw, the rookies appeared in a six-man tag team match, in which McGillicutty teamed with Alex Riley and Husky Harris to defeat Kaval, Lucky Cannon, and Percy Watson. The following night on NXT, his team lost a rematch, when McGillicutty was pinned by Kaval, and in the next poll later that night, McGillicutty relinquished the first place ranking back to Kaval, slipping to second place. In the season finale on August 31, McGillicutty ended the competition in second place, being beaten by Kaval, and at the end of the show, McGillicutty attacked Kaval with the other eliminated rookies, turning heel in the process.

==== The Nexus (2010–2011) ====
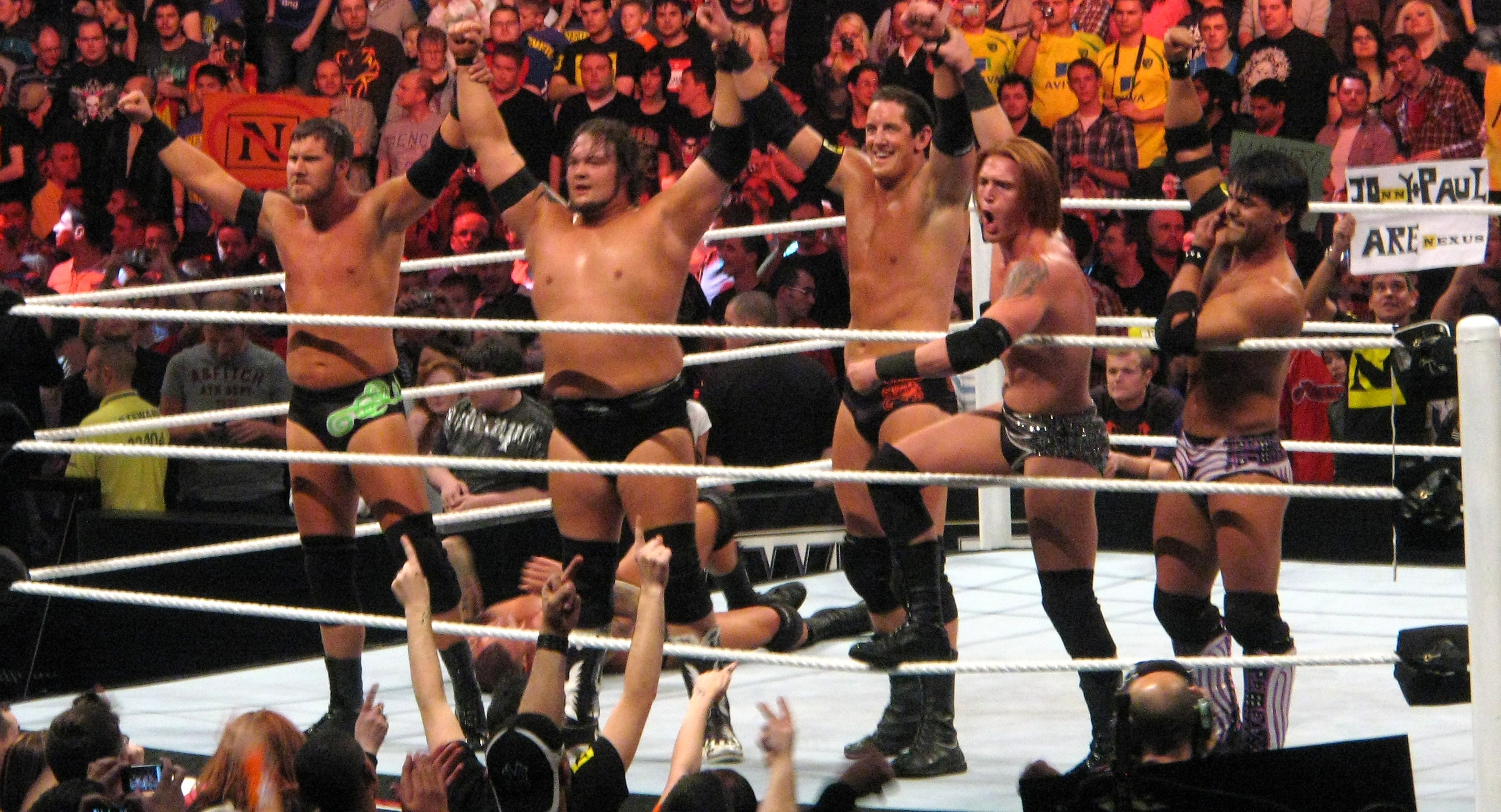
McGillicutty (far left) as part of The Nexus in November 2010

On October 3, 2010, at the Hell in a Cell pay-per-view, a disguised McGillicutty and Husky Harris interfered in a match between John Cena and Wade Barrett, and helped Barrett win, forcing Cena to join The Nexus per the pre-match stipulation. On the following day's episode of Raw, McGillicutty and Harris' identities were revealed, though Barrett claimed he had not asked for their help and refused to make them full-time members of The Nexus. The following week on Raw, McGillicutty and Harris cost Cena a match against The Miz, prompting Barrett to give them the opportunity to win membership in The Nexus. On the October 18 episode of Raw, McGillicutty and Harris failed to earn a place in The Nexus when they lost to Cena and Randy Orton in a tag team match. On the following Raw, in spite of their loss, Harris and McGillicutty were inducted into The Nexus.

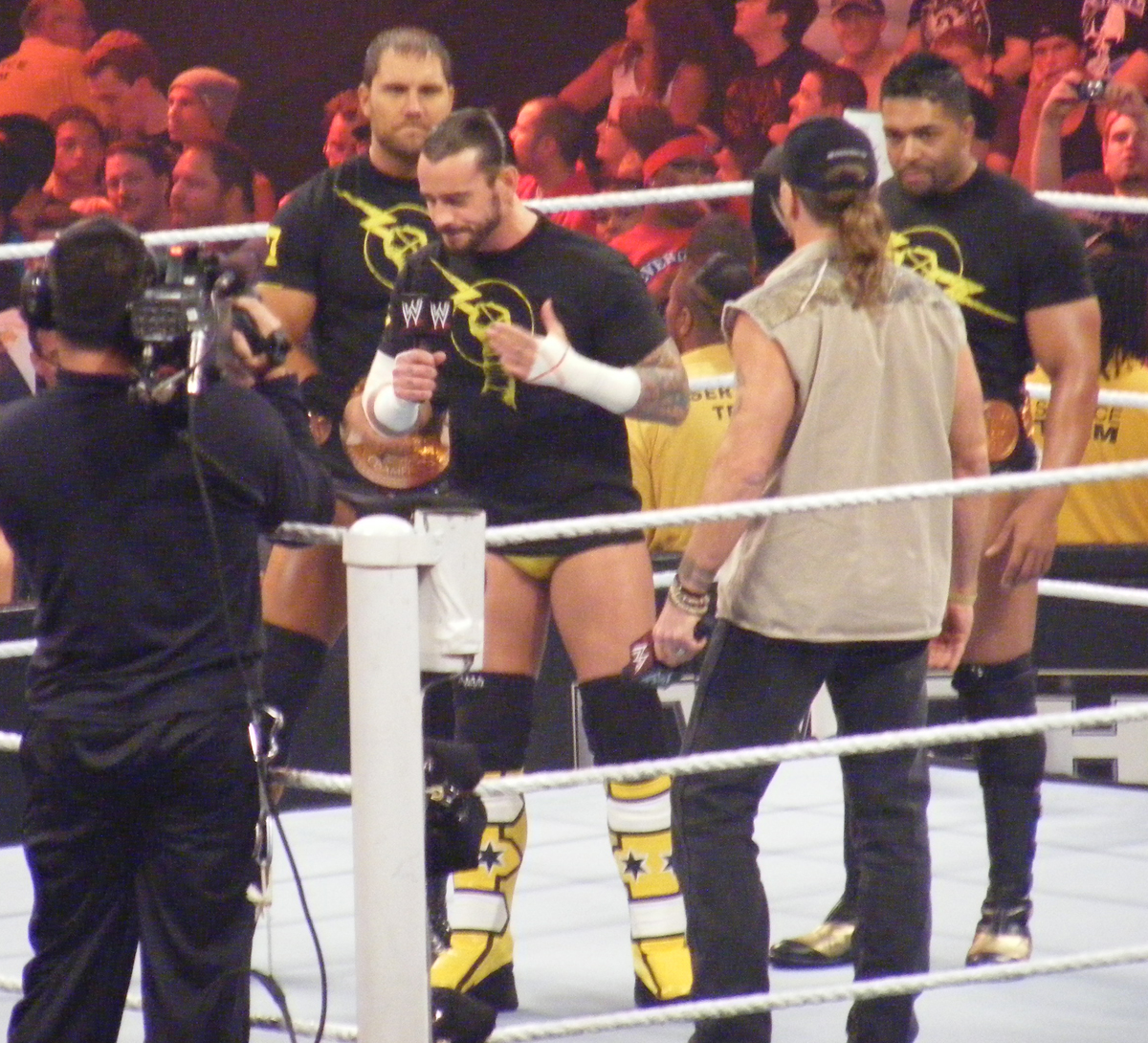
McGillicutty (far left) as part of The New Nexus in June 2011

In January 2011, CM Punk took over The Nexus and had each of its members put through an initiation, and McGillicutty passed his initiation, a beatdown from the rest of the group, and was allowed to remain a member of Nexus, alongside Punk, Harris and David Otunga. The following month, Punk was announced as the WrestleMania XXVII opponent for Randy Orton, and as a result, each member of The Nexus was scheduled to face Orton in the month prior to WrestleMania, with McGillicutty lost to Orton on the February 28 episode of Raw, and after the match Orton punted McGillicutty in the head. McGillicutty returned on the April 11 episode of Raw with the other Nexus members, preventing Orton from earning a WWE Championship match.

On the May 23 episode of Raw, McGillicutty teamed with fellow Nexus member David Otunga to win the WWE Tag Team Championship from Big Show and Kane, with the help interference from fellow Nexus members Punk and Mason Ryan. On the July 29 episode of SmackDown, they made their only successful title defense against The Usos (Jey Uso and Jimmy Uso). After CM Punk left The Nexus when his WWE contract expired on July 17, McGillicutty and Otunga competed against Santino Marella and Zack Ryder on the August 1 episode of Raw without any Nexus gear or armbands, and with all Nexus logos removed from their TitanTron, effectively signaling the end of The Nexus. On the August 22 episode of Raw, McGillicutty and Otunga lost the WWE Tag Team Championship to Air Boom (Evan Bourne and Kofi Kingston), ending their reign at 91 days.

==== Return to NXT (2011–2013) ====
After his dissociation with Otunga, he would largely be confined to wrestling on Superstars and NXT from late 2011. On the October 20 episode of Superstars, McGillicutty and Drew McIntyre lost a non-title match to the WWE Tag Team Champions Air Boom. In late 2011, McGillicutty and Alex Riley had a series of matches on Superstars, which Riley won 2–1. On the February 23, 2012, episode of Superstars, McGillicutty defeated Riley, which would be his last televised win on a non-NXT show until he was repackaged as Curtis Axel in May 2013, resulting in McGillicutty losing more than twenty non-NXT matches in a row, mostly on Superstars, but also on Main Event and Saturday Morning Slam.

McGillicutty made his return to NXT, appearing from January 2012 on the fifth season NXT Redemption, but not as a rookie. In February, McGillicutty mocked Tyson Kidd's lack of wrestling heritage, starting a feud on NXT Redemption. McGillicutty then beat Kidd on the February 29 episode of NXT Redemption. McGillicutty continued to insult Kidd by claiming that Kidd would never be a true 'Hart', and Kidd received a rematch on the March 21 episode of NXT Redemption, where he defeated McGillicutty. McGillicutty and Kidd faced off in a third match on the April 11 episode of NXT, resulting in Kidd triumphant over McGillicutty. McGillicutty then formed an occasional team with Johnny Curtis for the rest of 2012. On the final episode of the fifth season of NXT on June 13, McGillicutty and Curtis lost to The Usos.

After the conclusion of NXT Redemption, NXT transitioned into the renamed Florida Championship Wrestling developmental territory. McGillicutty continued appearing on the rebooted NXT, losing to Tyson Kidd on the first episode on June 20. On the August 8 episode of NXT, McGillicutty was inserted into the Gold Rush Tournament to crown the first NXT Champion, where he defeated Justin Gabriel in the quarter-finals. McGillicutty was eliminated in the semi-finals on August 15, when he lost to eventual tournament winner Seth Rollins. On the next episode, Tyson Kidd heaped more misery on McGillicutty as he and Justin Gabriel defeated McGillicutty and Johnny Curtis, but on the September 12 episode of NXT, McGillicutty gained revenge by defeating Kidd to become the number one contender for the NXT Championship. On the October 10 episode of NXT, McGillicutty failed to win the NXT Championship from Seth Rollins. On the November 28 episode of NXT, Johnny Curtis cashed in his promised tag title shot from winning season four of NXT, with McGillicutty as his partner against Team Hell No (Daniel Bryan and Kane), but Team Hell No won the match. On January 2, 2013, episode of NXT, McGillicutty turned face (but only within NXT) after saving Bo Dallas from a beating at the hands of Primo and Epico. On the next episode, Primo and Epico defeated McGillicutty and Dallas, though McGillicutty and Dallas would gain revenge when they defeated Primo and Epico in the first round of the NXT Tag Team Championship tournament to crown the inaugural champions on the January 30 episode of NXT. On the February 6 episode of NXT, McGillicutty and Dallas were eliminated in the semi-finals, when they lost to The Wyatt Family (Luke Harper and Erick Rowan).

==== Intercontinental Champion (2013–2014) ====
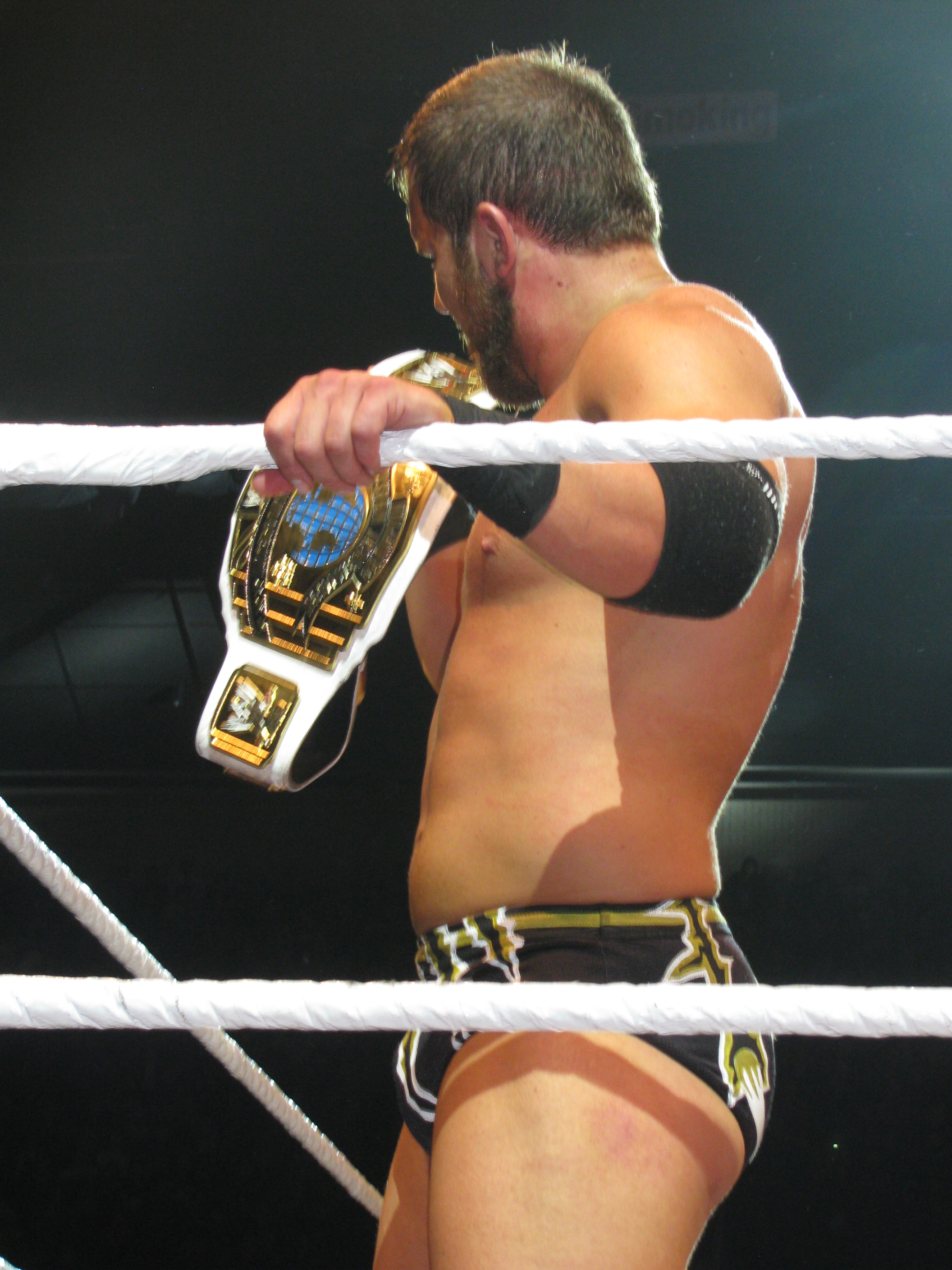
Axel as Intercontinental Champion in July 2013

On the May 20, 2013, episode of Raw, he was repackaged under the ring name Curtis Axel (the name is a derivative of his father's first name, Curt, and his grandfather Larry's nickname "The Axe"), with Paul Heyman as his new manager, and later that night, Axel won a match against Triple H. On the May 24 episode of SmackDown, Axel defeated Sin Cara. Over the next weeks on Raw, Axel scored wins over main eventers like WWE Champion John Cena, Chris Jericho, and Triple H. At Payback, Axel defeated Wade Barrett and The Miz in a triple threat match to win the Intercontinental Championship, joining his father as the first father-son pair to have won the title.

Axel retained the title at Money in the Bank, against The Miz at Night of Champions, against Kofi Kingston. at Battleground, against R-Truth. On the November 15 episode of SmackDown, Heyman ended his association with Axel and 3 days later, he lost the title to Big E Langston. At Survivor Series, Axel failed to regain the championship from Langston. According to Heyman, WWE paired both together so Heyman could appear to promote his other managed wrestler CM Punk and WWE had no plan for Axel.

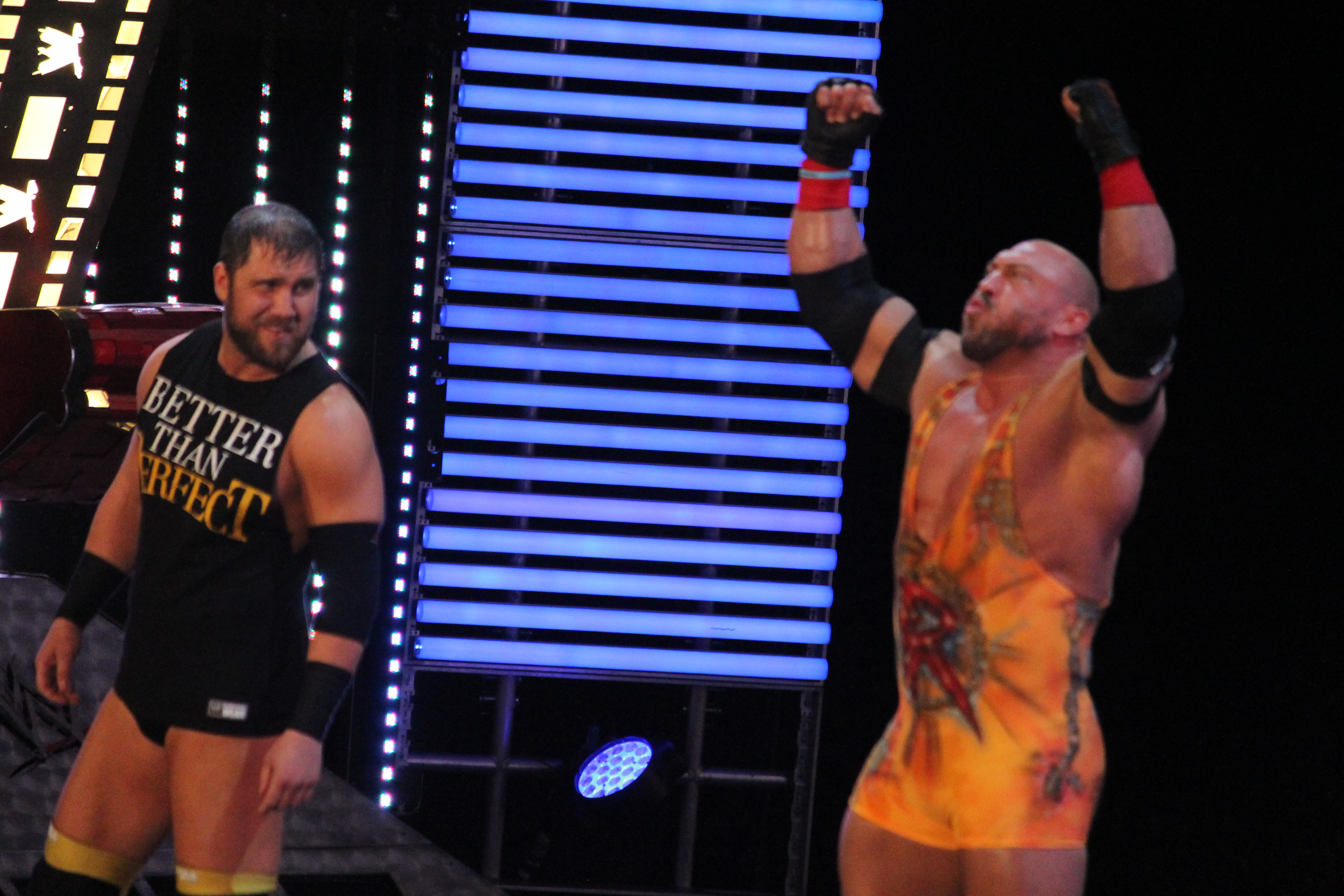
Axel (left) and Ryback became a tag team in December 2013

On the December 6 episode of SmackDown, Axel and Ryback defeated WWE Tag Team Champions Cody Rhodes and Goldust in a non-title match, earning themselves a shot at the title. At TLC: Tables, Ladders and Chairs, they would compete in a fatal four-way tag team elimination match for the WWE Tag Team Championship, but they were eliminated by Cody Rhodes and Goldust. At WrestleMania XXX on April 6, 2014, they failed to win the WWE Tag Team Championship in a fatal four-way tag team elimination match. Axel and Ryback would continue their brief feud with Cody Rhodes and Goldust from earlier in the year at Payback which they won, before losing the rematch at Money in the Bank. Ryback then took time off for surgery and returned as a singles competitor later that year, ending the team.

==== AxelMania and The Social Outcasts (2015–2017) ====
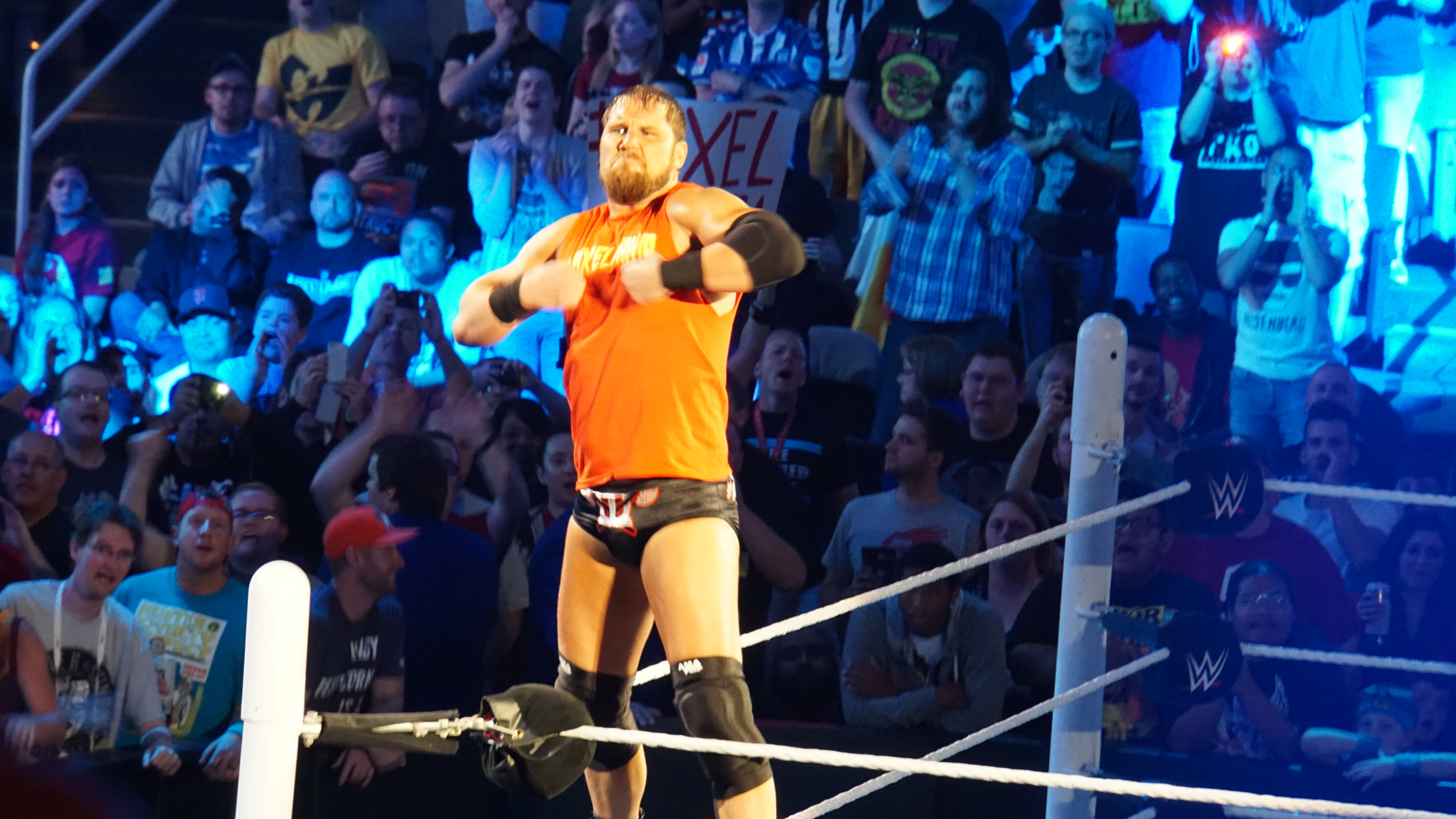
After Axel can not participate in the Royal Rumble match, he began parodying Hulk Hogan in early 2015

At the Royal Rumble on January 25, 2015, Axel was set to enter the Royal Rumble match at number 6, but was attacked by Erick Rowan on the entrance ramp, rendering him unable to compete. As a result of not being eliminated (having never officially entered the match), Axel trended on Twitter following the event, and also received supportive tweets from Lance Storm and Tommy Dreamer Xavier Woods, Zack Ryder, and David Otunga. Axel was defeated by Rowan on the following week's episode of Main Event. Axel then began an angle where he began referring to himself as "the true winner of the Royal Rumble", claiming that he still hadn't been eliminated from the match and that he deserved a shot at WrestleMania 31 for the WWE World Heavyweight Championship as a result. This involved Axel interrupting segments involving the likes of Dean Ambrose, John Cena, and Rusev to protest his cause, and also led to Axel starting his own hashtag, #AxelMania. At WrestleMania 31, Axel participated in the André the Giant Memorial Battle Royal, but was eliminated by multiple wrestlers.

On the May 11 episode of Raw, Axel turned face when he shook hands with Damien Sandow (who was impersonating Randy Savage as "Macho Mandow"), similar to the handshake of The Mega Powers, when they formed a tag team. After this, Axel began impersonating Hulk Hogan, while teaming with Sandow. The two were dubbed The Meta Powers. The Meta Powers were defeated by The Ascension at Payback (Konnor and Viktor). Axel and Sandow ceased their AxelMania and Macho Mandow imitations on July 24, after WWE fired Hulk Hogan and severed all ties with him.

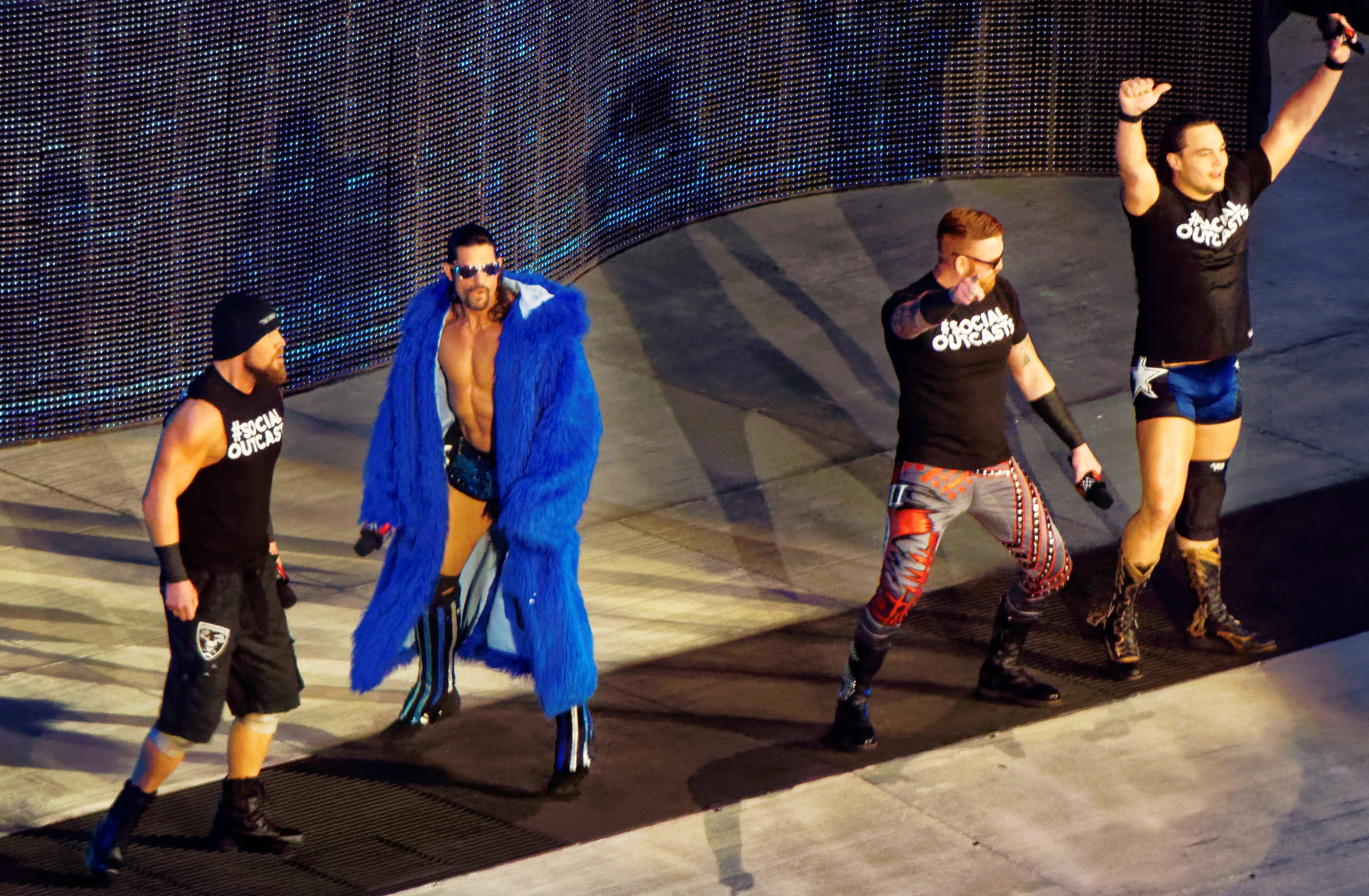
The Social Outcasts in April 2016

On the January 4, 2016, episode of Raw, Axel turned heel, when he along with Heath Slater, Adam Rose and Bo Dallas, debuted a new stable and assisted Slater in defeating Dolph Ziggler, calling themselves "The Social Outcasts". At Royal Rumble, Axel would enter the Royal Rumble match at number 5, before being eliminated by AJ Styles. On February 21 at Fastlane, Axel defeated R-Truth, with interference from fellow The Social Outcasts members. At WrestleMania 32, Axel participated in the André the Giant Memorial Battle Royal, which was won by Baron Corbin. In May, The Social Outcasts took time out to film The Marine 5: Battleground. The Social Outcasts returned on the June 27 episode of Raw, confronting Enzo Amore and Big Cass. The following week on Raw, The Social Outcasts were defeated by Enzo and Cass.

As part of the draft, Axel was drafted to the Raw brand as its last draft pick, earning him the nickname Mr. Irrelevant. After losing to the returning Neville, Axel then joined forces with former Social Outcasts member Bo Dallas, and they were defeated by Neville and Sami Zayn on the October 10 episode of Raw. The following week on Raw, Axel was attacked by Dallas after his match with Neville, thus turning face in the process. A week later, Axel received a pop from the crowd in his home state of Minnesota, before losing to Dallas. At WrestleMania 33 on April 2, 2017, Axel participated in the André the Giant Memorial Battle Royal, which was won by Mojo Rawley.

==== The Miztourage and The B-Team (2017–2020) ====
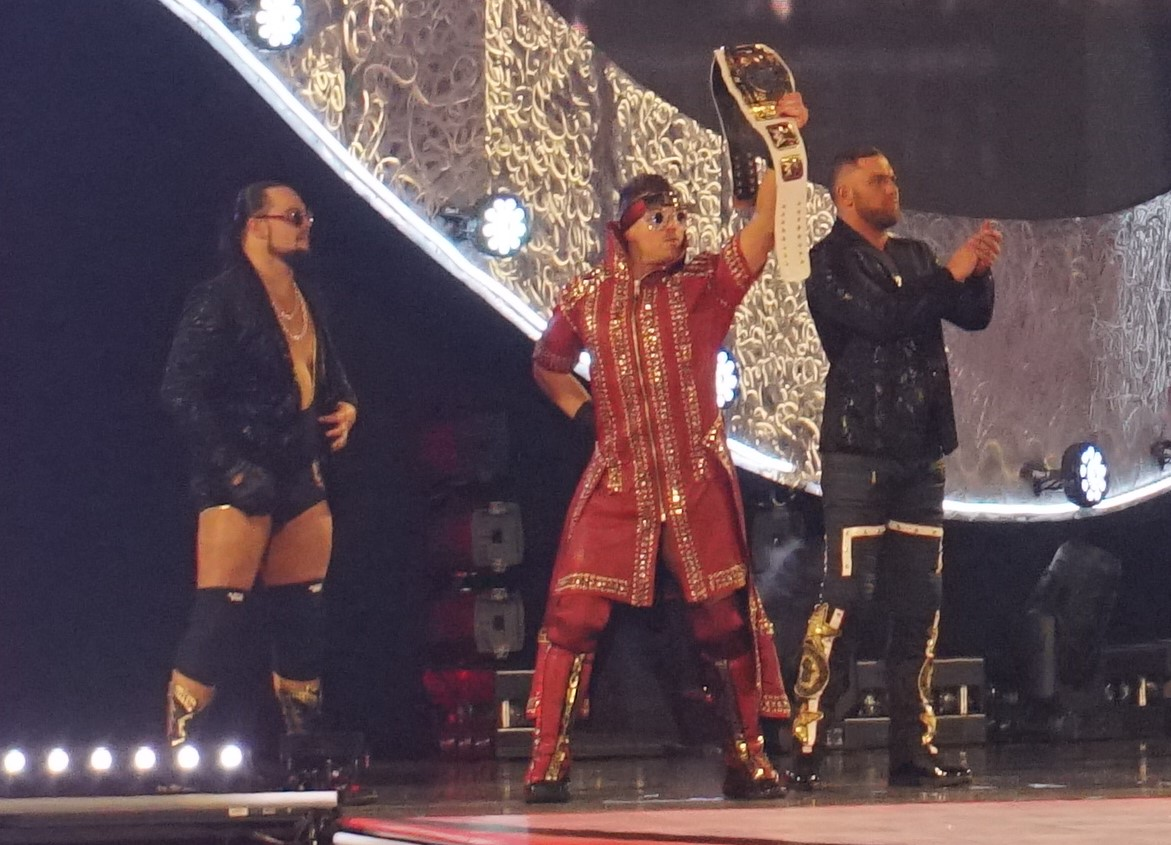
Axel (right) with Bo Dallas and The Miz at WrestleMania 34

On the June 19 episode of Raw, Intercontinental Champion The Miz approached Axel and Bo Dallas, offering to make them "the stars [they] deserve to be" if they become his entourage, and later that night, Axel and Dallas appeared in bear costumes during an in ring segment between Miz and his wife Maryse, attacking Dean Ambrose, thus turning heel once again. Axel and Dallas, now dubbed The Miztourage, began helping Miz in his matches and occasionally teamed him with him, including winning efforts against Dean Ambrose, Heath Slater and Rhyno on June 26 episode of Raw and Jason Jordan and The Hardy Boyz (Jeff Hardy and Matt Hardy) at SummerSlam. At No Mercy, they also helped Miz to defeat Jason Jordan to retain his title. At WrestleMania 34 on April 8, 2018, Axel participated in the André the Giant Memorial Battle Royal, but was eliminated by Kane. As part of the Superstar Shake-Up, Miz was moved to the SmackDown brand, while Axel and Dallas remained on Raw. On the April 16 episode of Raw, during a tag team match, Axel and Dallas turned on Miz, ending their alliance.

On the May 14 episode of Raw, the duo adopted the new team name "The B-Team" and defeated Breezango (Tyler Breeze and Fandango), their first win as a team since August 2017. On the June 4 episode of Raw, The B-Team won a tag team battle royal to determine the number one contenders for the Raw Tag Team Championships. At Extreme Rules, The B-Team defeated Bray Wyatt and Matt Hardy to win the Raw Tag Team Championship. On the July 23 episode of Raw, they successfully retained their title against Wyatt and Hardy. At SummerSlam on August 19, The B-Team successfully retained their title against The Revival (Dash Wilder and Scott Dawson). On the September 3 episode of Raw, The B-Team lost the championships to Dolph Ziggler and Drew McIntyre, ending their reign at 50 days.

At Survivor Series, The B-Team made up part of Team Raw as they took on Team SmackDown in a 10-on-10 Survivor Series tag team elimination match and Team Raw would go on to lose the match. At WrestleMania 35 on April 7, 2019, Axel competed in the André the Giant Memorial Battle Royal, but failed to win the match. As part of the Superstar Shake-up, both Axel and Dallas were moved to the SmackDown brand. On the February 28, 2020, edition of SmackDown, Axel was defeated by Daniel Bryan, in what would be his final appearance in WWE. On April 30, he was released from his WWE contract due to budget cuts stemming from the COVID-19 pandemic, ending his 13-year tenure with the company.

==== Backstage work (2022) ====
In April 2022, Hennig was rehired by WWE as a producer. On the May 30, 2022, episode of Raw, Hennig was seen as a security team member, breaking up the brawl between Cody Rhodes and Seth Rollins. Hennig was released 3 months later.

=== Return to independent circuit (2025) ===
On May 16, 2025, Hennig made his in-ring return at the Extreme Measures 2 event held by Midwest All-Star Wrestling, teaming with Cal Bloom to defeat The Gentlemen's Club (Aaron Arsenal and Lennox Leone) in his first match in five years.

== Other media ==
Hennig made his video game debut as a playable character in WWE '12 and has since appeared in WWE 2K15, WWE 2K16, WWE 2K17, WWE 2K18, WWE 2K19, WWE 2K20, and WWE 2K Battlegrounds.

Hennig also makes regular appearances on fellow WWE wrestler Xavier Woods's YouTube channel UpUpDownDown, under the nickname "Cold Beer". In 2017, Hennig starred in the WWE Studios film The Marine 5: Battleground, playing the role of a gang member named Deacon.

=== Filmography ===
Year	Title	Role	Notes
2016	Countdown	Curtis Axel	Uncredited cameo
2017	The Marine 5: Battleground	Deacon	

== Personal life ==
Hennig has been married to Brooke Hennig since 2004, and they have three sons. He enjoys ice fishing and fantasy football.

On May 17, 2026, Hennig was arrested in Anoka County, Minnesota and charged with driving under the influence (DUI). According to law enforcement records, he refused to submit to a chemical test, obstructed the lawful execution of legal process, possessed an open bottle of alcohol in his vehicle, and failed to stop after causing property damage in an accident that did not involve injuries. Hennig was held in custody and released from jail two days later on May 19.

== Championships and accomplishments ==
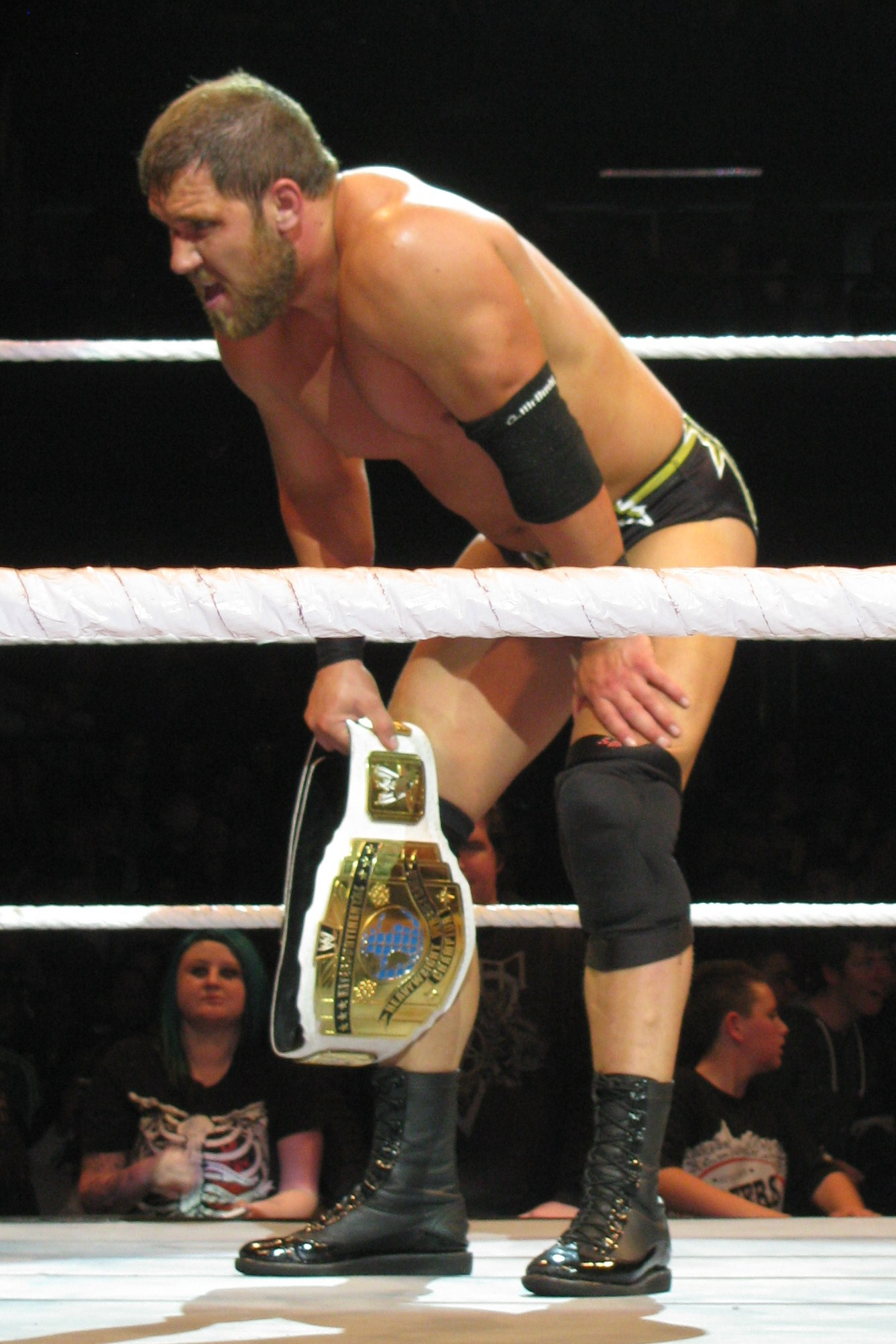
Axel is a former one-time WWE Intercontinental Champion...

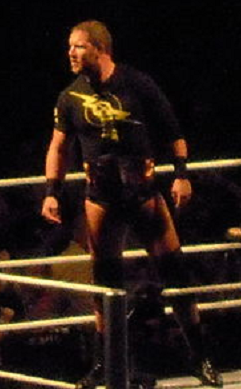
...and a former two-time WWE (Raw) Tag Team Champion.

- Florida Championship Wrestling
  - FCW Florida Heavyweight Championship (1 time)
  - FCW Florida Tag Team Championship (4 times) – with Tyler Reks (1), Heath Miller (1), Brett DiBiase (1) and Kaval (1)
- Pro Wrestling Illustrated
  - Feud of the Year (2010) – The Nexus vs. WWE
  - Most Hated Wrestler of the Year (2010) – As part of The Nexus
  - Rookie of the Year (2008)
  - Ranked No. 47 of the top 500 singles wrestlers in the PWI 500 in 2013
- WWE
  - WWE Intercontinental Championship (1 time)
  - WWE (Raw) Tag Team Championship (2 times) – with David Otunga (1) and Bo Dallas (1) (Note: During his first reign, the title was referred to as the WWE Tag Team Championship, in his second it was named the Raw Tag Team Championship.)
