= Survivor Series (2018) =

WWE pay-per-view and livestreaming event

- Promotional poster featuring Seth Rollins, Shinsuke Nakamura, Ronda Rousey, Becky Lynch, Brock Lesnar, and AJ Styles
- Promotion: WWE
- Brand(s): Raw; SmackDown; 205 Live
- Date: November 18, 2018
- City: Los Angeles, California
- Venue: Staples Center
- Attendance: 16,320
- Tagline: Raw vs. SmackDown

WWE event chronology
← Previous; NXT TakeOver: WarGames	Next → Starrcade

Survivor Series chronology
← Previous; 2017	Next → 2019

The 2018 Survivor Series was a professional wrestling pay-per-view (PPV) and livestreaming event produced by WWE, held for wrestlers from the promotion's main roster brands, Raw, SmackDown, and 205 Live. It was the 32nd annual Survivor Series and took place on November 18, 2018, at the Staples Center in Los Angeles, California. It was the first Survivor Series since 2009 to feature three brands. The theme of the event was brand supremacy, where all but one match involved wrestlers from Raw and SmackDown in direct competition, including the titular Survivor Series match, a tag team elimination match that pits teams of multiple wrestlers against each other.

Eight matches were contested at the event, including one on the Kickoff pre-show. In the main event, Raw's Universal Champion Brock Lesnar defeated SmackDown's WWE Champion Daniel Bryan. There were three Survivor Series matches, with one occurring on the pre-show. For the two that occurred on the main card, Raw's men's and women's teams were victorious over SmackDown's. Also on the card, Raw Women's Champion Ronda Rousey defeated SmackDown's Charlotte Flair via disqualification; Rousey was originally scheduled to face SmackDown Women's Champion Becky Lynch, but Lynch suffered a legitimate broken nose just prior to the event. In a match from 205 Live, which was the only title defense on the card as well as the only non-interpromotional match, Buddy Murphy retained the WWE Cruiserweight Championship against Mustafa Ali. Raw won brand supremacy with a clean sweep over SmackDown in all six interpromotional matches on the main card. SmackDown's only win occurred on the Kickoff pre-show in the 10-on-10 Survivor Series match that pitted five tag teams from Raw against five tag teams from SmackDown.

== Production ==
=== Background ===
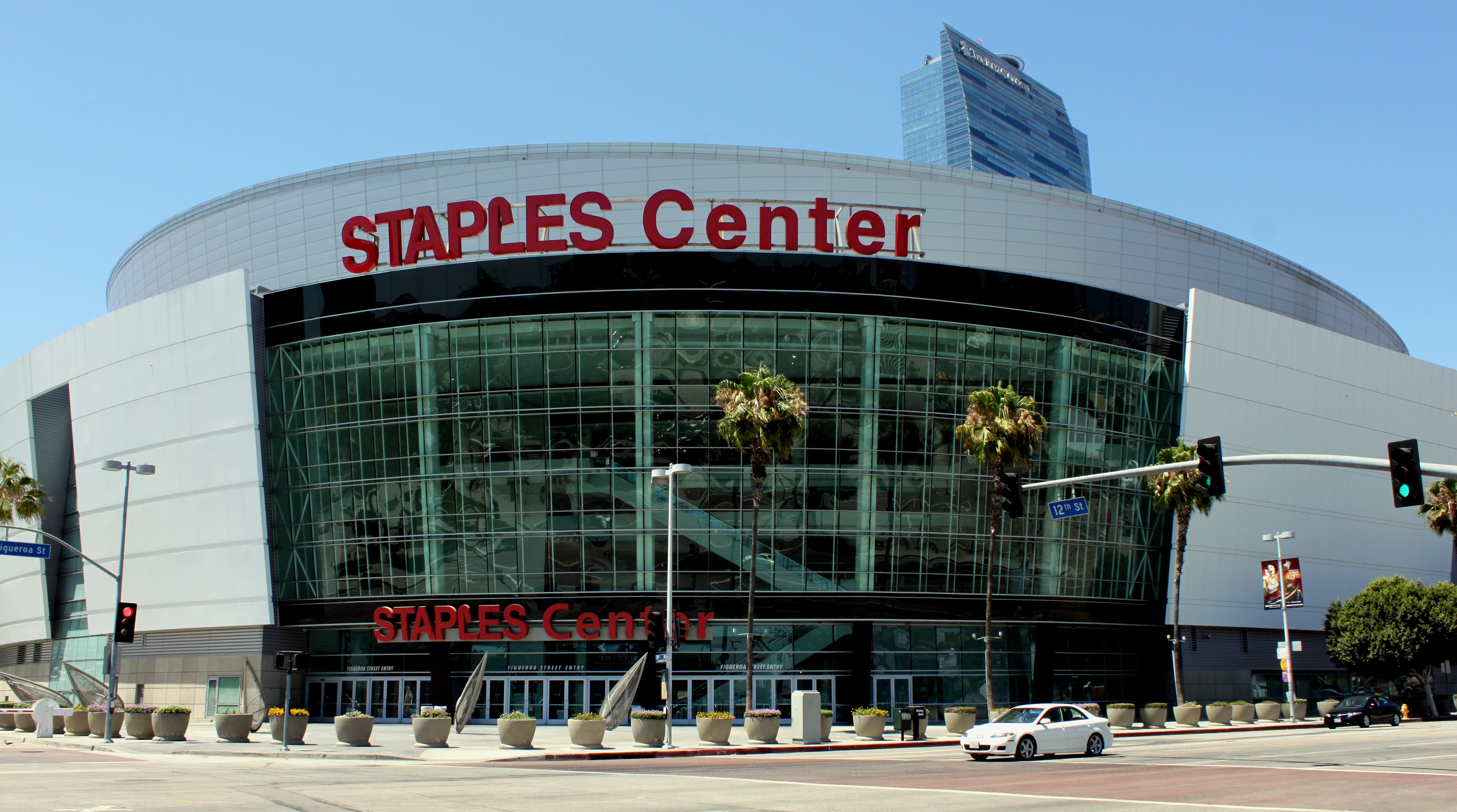
The 32nd annual Survivor Series event was held at the Staples Center in Los Angeles, California.

Survivor Series is an annual professional wrestling event, produced every November by WWE since 1987, generally held around Thanksgiving in the United States. It was originally broadcast exclusively via pay-per-view (PPV) before it began simultaneously livestreaming on the WWE Network in 2014. In what has become the second longest-running PPV event in history (behind WWE's WrestleMania), it is one of the promotion's original four PPVs, along with WrestleMania, SummerSlam, and Royal Rumble, referred to as the "Big Four". The event is traditionally characterized by having Survivor Series matches, which are tag team elimination matches that typically pits teams of four or five wrestlers against each other. Announced on November 16, 2017, the 32nd Survivor Series was scheduled to be held on November 18, 2018, at the Staples Center in Los Angeles, California. Tickets went on sale on March 16.

Since WWE reintroduced the brand split in 2016, Survivor Series became centered around competition between wrestlers from Raw and SmackDown for brand supremacy. In addition to traditional Survivor Series matches between the two brands, the 2017 event began the theme of having the champions of Raw facing their SmackDown counterparts in non-title matches. The 2018 event had Raw's Universal Champion against SmackDown's WWE Champion, Raw's Intercontinental Champion against SmackDown's United States Champion, and the Raw Tag Team Champions against the SmackDown Tag Team Champions. A match featuring the Raw Women's Champion against the SmackDown Women's Champion was planned, but called off due to the latter sustaining a legit injury just days prior to the event; the Raw Women's Champion was instead scheduled to face a former SmackDown Women's Champion. As the 205 Live brand's WWE Cruiserweight Championship was the only title of its kind in WWE, it was the only title defended on the show and the only non-interbrand match. This was also the only Survivor Series to include the 205 Live brand, and the first since the 2009 event to feature three brands.

=== Storylines ===
The event comprised eight matches, including one on the Kickoff pre-show, that resulted from scripted storylines. Results were predetermined by WWE's writers on the Raw, SmackDown, and 205 Live brands, while storylines were produced on WWE's weekly television shows, Monday Night Raw, SmackDown Live, and the cruiserweight-exclusive 205 Live.

At Evolution, Ronda Rousey defeated Nikki Bella to retain the Raw Women's Championship, while Becky Lynch defeated Charlotte Flair in a Last Woman Standing match to retain the SmackDown Women's Championship. During a backstage interview following her win, Rousey was confronted by Lynch and an interpromotional non-title match between the two champions was scheduled for Survivor Series the following night on Raw. On the November 12 episode of Raw, Lynch led the SmackDown women's division in an invasion of Raw and applied the "Dis-arm-her" on Rousey. During the melee, Lynch suffered a legit broken nose and concussion following a punch from Nia Jax. Due to the injury, Lynch was pulled from the Survivor Series match and chose Flair as her replacement.

At Crown Jewel, AJ Styles defeated Samoa Joe to retain the WWE Championship, while Brock Lesnar defeated Braun Strowman to win the vacant Universal Championship, setting up a rematch between Styles and Lesnar from the previous year's event. On the final SmackDown before Survivor Series, Styles and Daniel Bryan had a heated exchange stemming from their WWE Championship match two weeks prior. As such, SmackDown Commissioner Shane McMahon scheduled Styles to defend the championship against Bryan later that night. Bryan defeated Styles to become the new WWE Champion after hitting him with a low blow while the referee was knocked down, thus Bryan replaced Styles as Lesnar's opponent for Survivor Series. After the match, Bryan attacked Styles, turning heel.

During the Crown Jewel Kickoff pre-show, Shinsuke Nakamura defeated Rusev to retain SmackDown's United States Championship. Following the event, a match between Nakamura and Raw's Intercontinental Champion Seth Rollins was scheduled for Survivor Series.

At Crown Jewel, The Bar (Cesaro and Sheamus) retained the SmackDown Tag Team Championship against The New Day (Big E and Kofi Kingston), while on the November 5 episode of Raw, AOP (Akam and Rezar) defeated Seth Rollins in a handicap match to become the new Raw Tag Team Champions. A match between the two teams was then scheduled for Survivor Series.

At Super Show-Down, Buddy Murphy defeated Cedric Alexander to win the WWE Cruiserweight Championship. On the October 31 episode of 205 Live, Mustafa Ali defeated Tony Nese to become the number one contender, and his championship match against Murphy was scheduled for Survivor Series.

On the November 5 episode of Raw, Acting Raw General Manager Baron Corbin revealed Braun Strowman, Dolph Ziggler, and Drew McIntyre as the first three members of Team Raw for the men's Survivor Series match while naming himself as captain, although stating he would not compete due to his managerial position. Kurt Angle interjected, wanting to replace Corbin as captain, therefore Corbin had Angle face McIntyre where if Angle won, he would have been on the team; however, Angle lost. The following week, Finn Bálor defeated Ziggler in a match and returning Raw Commissioner Stephanie McMahon rewarded Bálor by adding him to the team. Later, Bobby Lashley won the final spot by defeating Elias. Also on that episode, Stephanie promised Strowman another Universal Championship match against Brock Lesnar and also a match against Corbin, who had cost Strowman his Universal title match at Crown Jewel (with Strowman choosing the stipulations for either match), if he could lead Raw to another victory over SmackDown and not touch Corbin until after the event. On the November 6 episode of SmackDown, the brand's Commissioner Shane McMahon and General Manager Paige appointed The Miz and Daniel Bryan as co-captains of Team SmackDown. Miz and Bryan then added Shane to the team as he had won the WWE World Cup at Crown Jewel. Later, Rey Mysterio and Samoa Joe joined the team after defeating Andrade "Cien" Almas and Jeff Hardy, respectively. A brawl then ensued between Joe, Bryan, Miz, and Shane. The following week, Bryan was removed from Team SmackDown due to his actions and subsequent WWE Championship match victory against AJ Styles, therefore replacing Styles in the champion vs. champion match. Following that alteration, Hardy replaced him after defeating Almas.

On the November 5 episode of Raw, Acting Raw General Manager Baron Corbin named Alexa Bliss as captain of Team Raw for the women's Survivor Series match, but in a non-competing capacity due to injury. The following week, Bliss revealed Mickie James, Nia Jax, Tamina, and Natalya, who was absent, as her first four picks and announced that the winner of a match between Bayley and Sasha Banks would be the final member. During the match, the women's team attacked Bayley and Banks, causing a no-contest ruling and Bliss said neither would be on the team and then introduced Ruby Riott as the final member. On the November 6 episode of SmackDown, the band's General Manager Paige revealed Asuka, Carmella, Naomi, Sonya Deville, and Charlotte Flair as the members of Team SmackDown, but Flair did not show up; the previous week, Paige asked Flair to be captain, but Flair felt she was not the right person and then said she would think about it. Flair was instead named Becky Lynch's replacement to face Ronda Rousey, and the final member of Team SmackDown was not revealed on the final SmackDown before Survivor Series.

On the November 6 episode of SmackDown, The Usos (Jey Uso and Jimmy Uso) defeated The New Day (Big E and Kofi Kingston) to become the captains of Team SmackDown in the Survivor Series match pitting five tag teams from Raw against five tag teams from SmackDown (in this version, when one member of a tag team is eliminated, both members of that particular tag team are eliminated). Immediately after the match, The Usos chose The New Day as their first pick. The following week, The Usos added Sanity (Eric Young, Alexander Wolfe, and Killian Dain), Luke Gallows and Karl Anderson, and The Colóns (Primo Colón and Epico Colón) to the team. On the November 12 episode of Raw, a tag team battle royal occurred to determine Team Raw's captains. The team of Bobby Roode and Chad Gable defeated The Revival (Dash Wilder and Scott Dawson), The B-Team (Bo Dallas and Curtis Axel), Lucha House Party (Gran Metalik, Kalisto, and Lince Dorado), The Ascension (Konnor and Viktor), and the team of Heath Slater and Rhyno to win the captaincy of Team Raw, composed of all of the teams in the battle royal except Slater and Rhyno (who were the first eliminated). The match was scheduled for the Survivor Series Kickoff pre-show.

== Event ==
Other on-screen personnel
Role	Name
English commentators	Michael Cole (Raw)
English commentators	Corey Graves (Raw/SmackDown)
English commentators	Renee Young (Raw)
English commentators	Tom Phillips (SmackDown)
English commentators	Byron Saxton (SmackDown)
English commentators	Vic Joseph (Cruiserweight title match)
English commentators	Nigel McGuinness (Cruiserweight title match)
English commentators	Percy Watson (Cruiserweight title match)
Russian commentators	Zhan Pomerantsev
Russian commentators	Morti Margolin
Spanish commentators	Carlos Cabrera
Spanish commentators	Marcelo Rodríguez
German commentators	Carsten Schaefer
German commentators	Calvin Knie
Ring announcers	Greg Hamilton
Ring announcers	JoJo
Referees	Danilo Anfibio
Referees	Jason Ayers
Referees	Mike Chioda
Referees	John Cone
Referees	Darrick Moore
Referees	Ryan Tran
Referees	Rod Zapata
Interviewer	Charly Caruso
Interviewer	Kayla Braxton
Pre-show panel	Jonathan Coachman
Pre-show panel	Jerry Lawler
Pre-show panel	Beth Phoenix
Pre-show panel	David Otunga
Pre-show panel	Booker T

=== Pre-show ===
During the Survivor Series Kickoff pre-show, the 10-on-10 Survivor Series tag team elimination match featuring Team Raw's tag teams (Bobby Roode and Chad Gable, The Ascension (Konnor and Viktor), Lucha House Party (Kalisto and Lince Dorado, with Gran Metalik), The Revival (Scott Dawson and Dash Wilder), and The B-Team (Curtis Axel and Bo Dallas)) against Team SmackDown's tag teams (The Usos (Jey Uso and Jimmy Uso), The New Day (Big E and Xavier Woods, with Kofi Kingston), The Colóns (Primo and Epico), Sanity (Killian Dain and Eric Young, with Alexander Wolfe), and Luke Gallows and Karl Anderson) occurred. Kalisto suffered a knee injury and the referee allowed Metalik to replace him. The Revival performed "Shatter Machine" on Primo to eliminate The Colóns. Anderson pinned Dallas with a schoolboy to eliminate The B-Team. Gable and Roode performed their neckbreaker/moonsault combo on Young to eliminate Sanity. Woods, with assistance from Big E, performed a splash on Viktor to eliminate The Ascension. Metalik performed a springboard swanton on Anderson to eliminate Gallows and Anderson. Jey performed the "Alley Uce" on Dorado to eliminate Lucha House Party. New Day performed "UpUpDownDown" on Gable to eliminate Roode and Gable. The Revival performed "Shatter Machine" on Woods to eliminate The New Day. In the climax, Jimmy performed the "Uso Splash" on Dawson to eliminate The Revival and win the match as the lone survivors for Team SmackDown.

Also during the pre-show, Naomi was revealed as the captain of Team SmackDown's women's team and introduced Mandy Rose as the final member of their team. For Team Raw, a brawl ensued between Natalya and Ruby Riott. Team captain Alexa Bliss then removed Natalya and Riott from the team and replaced them with Sasha Banks and Bayley.

=== Preliminary matches ===
The actual pay-per-view opened with the women's 5-on-5 Survivor Series elimination match, featuring Team Raw (Nia Jax, Tamina, Mickie James, Sasha Banks, and Bayley) (accompanied by Alexa Bliss) against Team SmackDown (Naomi, Asuka, Carmella (accompanied by R-Truth), Sonya Deville, and Mandy Rose). Tamina performed a superkick on Naomi to eliminate her. Carmella then surprised Tamina with a schoolgirl to eliminate her. Deville performed a sliding knee on James followed by Rose pinning James to eliminate her. Bayley performed the "Bayley to Belly" on Carmella to eliminate her. Banks applied the "Bank Statement" on Rose, forcing Rose to submit, thereby eliminating Rose. Bayley and Deville brawled outside of the ring to a double countout, eliminating both women. After a competitive battle between Asuka and Banks, Banks attempted a Meteora on Asuka from the top rope, but Jax shoved her off and into the "Asuka Lock" by Asuka, resulting in Banks' elimination. Afterwards, Jax performed three leg drops and a Samoan drop on Asuka to win the match as the sole survivor for Team Raw.

Backstage, Raw Commissioner Stephanie McMahon and Acting Raw General Manager Baron Corbin celebrated the win. Stephanie told Corbin that if Raw has a clean sweep over SmackDown on the main card, she would consider making him the permanent Raw General Manager.

Next, Raw's Intercontinental Champion Seth Rollins faced SmackDown's United States Champion Shinsuke Nakamura. During the match, Rollins performed three suicide dives and a springboard clothesline on Nakamura for a nearfall. Rollins performed a ripcord knee for a nearfall. Nakamura performed a "Kinshasa" for a nearfall. In the end, Rollins performed "The Stomp" on Nakamura to win the match.

After that, Raw Tag Team Champions AOP (Akam and Rezar) (accompanied by Drake Maverick) faced SmackDown Tag Team Champions The Bar (Cesaro and Sheamus) (accompanied by Big Show). In the climax, Sheamus performed the "Brogue Kick" on Rezar, but during the pin attempt, Maverick placed Rezar's foot on the bottom rope, voiding the pinfall. Cesaro chased Maverick, who ran into Big Show. Big Show grabbed Maverick by the throat, only for Maverick to pee in his pants. This distraction allowed AOP to perform a neckbreaker/powerbomb combo on Sheamus to win the match for Raw.

Next was the only non-interpromotional match and only title defense on the show in which Buddy Murphy defended the WWE Cruiserweight Championship against Mustafa Ali. In the end, Murphy performed "Murphy's Law" on Ali to retain the title.

In the fifth match, the men's 5-on-5 Survivor Series elimination match, featuring Team Raw (Drew McIntyre, Dolph Ziggler, Braun Strowman, Bobby Lashley (with Lio Rush), and Finn Bálor) (with Baron Corbin) against Team SmackDown (The Miz, Shane McMahon, Rey Mysterio, Samoa Joe, and Jeff Hardy) was contested. Strowman was going to start the match, only for McIntyre to quickly tag himself in. As McIntyre mocked Strowman, Joe took advantage and applied the "Coquina Clutch" on McIntyre, who was able to escape and perform the "Claymore Kick" to eliminate Joe. Shane and Ziggler then faced off. A brawl broke out between Strowman and McIntyre, which led to Team SmackDown attacking them. Outside of the ring, Shane performed an elbow drop on Strowman through an announce table. Mysterio eliminated Bálor after a "619" and a springboard frog splash. Shane performed a "Coast to Coast" on Ziggler to eliminate him. Shane attempted another "Coast to Coast" on Lashley, only for Strowman, who recovered from earlier, to perform a clothesline in mid-air on Shane. Hardy went for the "Twist of Fate", but Strowman blocked and powerslammed Hardy to eliminate him. Mysterio was able to momentarily subdue Strowman and attempted a "619", but Strowman intercepted him with a powerslam, resulting in Mysterio's elimination. After chasing The Miz out of the ring and back inside, Strowman performed a powerslam on The Miz to eliminate him. In the climax, Shane told Strowman to "bring it", and Strowman responded with a dropkick and a running powerslam to win the match for Team Raw with Strowman, McIntyre, and Lashley as the survivors. After the match, Corbin attacked Strowman and quickly retreated with McIntyre and Lashley.

Backstage, Seth Rollins was interviewed by Charly Caruso. She informed Rollins that he would be defending the Intercontinental Championship against his friend-turned-rival Dean Ambrose at TLC: Tables, Ladders & Chairs.

In the penultimate match, Raw Women's Champion Ronda Rousey faced SmackDown's Charlotte Flair in a non-title match. After an even match between the two, Rousey performed "Piper's Pit" on Flair, only for Flair to perform a "Spear" on Rousey for a nearfall. Rousey attempted an "armbar", but Flair blocked and applied the "figure-four leglock". Rousey was able to reverse the pressure, and both women rolled out of the ring. Flair performed a "Big Boot" on Rousey for a nearfall. In the climax, Rousey performed a second "Piper's Pit" on Flair and attempted the "Armbar" again, but Flair rolled out of the ring. After Flair beat the count back in the ring and went back outside, Rousey charged at Flair, only for Flair to strike Rousey with a kendo stick, thus Rousey won by disqualification. After the match, Flair continued to attack Rousey with kendo sticks. In the ring, Flair performed "Natural Selection" on Rousey on a chair. Flair positioned Rousey's neck in the chair and stomped on it before departing backstage.

=== Main event ===
In the main event, Raw's Universal Champion Brock Lesnar (accompanied by Paul Heyman) faced SmackDown's WWE Champion Daniel Bryan. Lesnar performed several suplexes on Bryan. Lesnar performed an "F-5" on Bryan, but during the pin attempt, he intentionally broke the fall himself. Lesnar attempted a second "F-5" on Bryan, only to accidentally hit the referee in the process. While the referee was down, Bryan seized the opportunity to low blow Lesnar. Bryan performed a running knee on Lesnar for a nearfall. Bryan began to target Lesnar's knee by slamming it into the ring post. Back in the ring, as Lesnar attempted another "F-5", Lesnar's knee gave out. Bryan capitalized and performed the "Yes! Lock" submission, only for Lesnar to escape. In the end, as Bryan applied a triangle hold on Lesnar, Lesnar countered and performed the "F-5" on Bryan to win the match, with Raw winning brand supremacy with a clean sweep over SmackDown on the main card.

== Enzo Amore hijacking incident ==
Former WWE wrestler Enzo Amore was spotted during the event wearing a disguised wig and hoodie in the background. At the beginning of the AOP and The Bar match, when it became clear that it was Amore, he started making a scene, standing on his chair, dancing and yelling at the crowd. While WWE did not acknowledge his presence, Amore was then escorted out of the building by security and was banned from future events at the Staples Center. Reports also stated that Amore had bumped into a woman, causing her to get knocked over, injuring the fan in the process.

This incident came hours after he released a new album called Rosemary's Baby Pt. 1: Happy Birthday featuring a song that seems to include lyrics about his ex-girlfriend and current WWE wrestler Liv Morgan.

== Aftermath ==
=== Raw ===
The following night on Raw, Commissioner Stephanie McMahon opened the show and celebrated the Raw brand's clean sweep over SmackDown. Stephanie was interrupted by Braun Strowman, who wanted his promised matches. She granted Strowman a match with Acting Raw General Manager Baron Corbin at TLC: Tables, Ladders & Chairs and Strowman chose a TLC match as the stipulation. In regard to his promised Universal Championship match, Stephanie said that if Strowman defeated Corbin, then he would get his title match at the Royal Rumble and Corbin would be stripped of all authority, but if Corbin won, Corbin would become the permanent Raw General Manager. Later that night, during an elimination tag team match, Corbin, Drew McIntyre, and Bobby Lashley attacked Strowman, injuring his elbow, as a storyline excuse for Strowman to take a short time off and undergo surgery to remove bone spurs.

Fresh off her disqualification victory over Charlotte Flair, Ronda Rousey confirmed that she would be defending the Raw Women's Championship against Nia Jax at TLC: Tables, Ladders & Chairs as Jax had won a 20-woman battle royal at Evolution to earn the title match. Rousey then made an open challenge and successfully defended the title against Mickie James. After the match, Rousey was taunted by Jax and Tamina.

=== SmackDown ===
Charlotte Flair explained her actions on the following episode of SmackDown, stating that her attack on Ronda Rousey was for the women of SmackDown and for her friend Becky Lynch. However, SmackDown General Manager Paige fined Flair $100,000 for attacking WWE officials during the brawl. After being interrupted by The IIconics (Billie Kay and Peyton Royce), Flair had back-to-back singles matches with both. She defeated Kay by submission and then Royce by disqualification after Kay attacked Flair, who in turn laid out both IIconics. The following week, a Tables, Ladders, and Chairs match between Lynch and Flair for the SmackDown Women's Championship was scheduled for TLC. Later that night, Asuka won a battle royal to be added to the match.

WWE Champion Daniel Bryan explained his actions from the previous week by stating that he was following his dreams to become champion again and accused the fans of not being there for him during his three-year quest to return to the ring. Bryan claimed that he allowed Brock Lesnar to beat out what was left of his old self and rechristened himself as the "new" Daniel Bryan while also saying that the "Yes! Movement" was dead. It was then announced that AJ Styles would receive his WWE Championship rematch against Bryan at TLC: Tables, Ladders & Chairs.

== Results ==
No.	Results	Stipulations	Times
1^{P}	Team SmackDown (The Usos (Jey Uso and Jimmy Uso), The New Day (Big E and Xavier Woods), Sanity (Eric Young and Killian Dain), Gallows and Anderson, and The Colóns (Epico Colón and Primo Colón)) (with Kofi Kingston and Alexander Wolfe) defeated Team Raw (Bobby Roode and Chad Gable, The Revival (Dash Wilder and Scott Dawson), The B-Team (Bo Dallas and Curtis Axel), Lucha House Party (Lince Dorado and Kalisto/Gran Metalik), (Note: Kalisto was injured (kayfabe) during the match and the referee allowed Metalik to take his place.) and The Ascension (Konnor and Viktor))^{1}	10-on-10 Survivor Series tag team match	22:20
2	Team Raw (Mickie James, Nia Jax, Tamina, Bayley, and Sasha Banks) (with Alexa Bliss) defeated Team SmackDown (Naomi, Carmella, Sonya Deville, Asuka, and Mandy Rose)^{2}	5-on-5 Survivor Series match	18:50
3	Seth Rollins (Raw's Intercontinental Champion) defeated Shinsuke Nakamura (SmackDown's United States Champion) by pinfall	Champion vs. Champion match	21:50
4	AOP (Akam and Rezar) (Raw Tag Team Champions) (with Drake Maverick) defeated The Bar (Cesaro and Sheamus) (SmackDown Tag Team Champions) (with Big Show) by pinfall	Champions vs. Champions match	9:00
5	Buddy Murphy (c) defeated Mustafa Ali by pinfall	Singles match for the WWE Cruiserweight Championship	12:20
6	Team Raw (Dolph Ziggler, Drew McIntyre, Braun Strowman, Finn Bálor, and Bobby Lashley) (with Baron Corbin and Lio Rush) defeated Team SmackDown (The Miz, Shane McMahon, Rey Mysterio, Samoa Joe, and Jeff Hardy)^{3}	5-on-5 Survivor Series match	24:00
7	Ronda Rousey (Raw) defeated Charlotte Flair (SmackDown) by disqualification	Singles match	14:40
8	Brock Lesnar (Raw's Universal Champion) (with Paul Heyman) defeated Daniel Bryan (SmackDown's WWE Champion) by pinfall	Champion vs. Champion match	18:50
(c) / – the champion(s) heading into the match; P / – the match was broadcast on the pre-show

=== Survivor Series matches ===
^1

Eliminated	Wrestler	Eliminated by	Method	Times
1	The Colóns	Dash Wilder	Pinfall	3:10
2	The B-Team	Karl Anderson	Pinfall	5:15
3	Sanity	Bobby Roode	Pinfall	6:45
4	The Ascension	Big E	Pinfall	9:00
5	Luke Gallows and Karl Anderson	Gran Metalik	Pinfall	11:05
6	Lucha House Party	Jey Uso	Pinfall	12:15
7	Bobby Roode and Chad Gable	Big E	Pinfall	18:30
8	The New Day	Dash Wilder	Pinfall	19:50
9	The Revival	Jimmy Uso	Pinfall	22:20
Survivor(s):	The Usos (Jey Uso and Jimmy Uso) (Team SmackDown)			22:20

^2

Eliminated	Wrestler	Eliminated by	Method	Times
1	Naomi	Tamina	Pinfall	1:20
2	Tamina	Carmella	Pinfall	1:30
3	Mickie James	Mandy Rose	Pinfall	6:50
4	Carmella	Bayley	Pinfall	8:20
5	Mandy Rose	Sasha Banks	Submission	9:55
6	Bayley	N/A	Countout	14:45
7	Sonya Deville	N/A	Countout	14:45
8	Sasha Banks	Asuka	Submission	18:10
9	Asuka	Nia Jax	Pinfall	18:50
Sole Survivor:	Nia Jax (Team Raw)			18:50

^3

Eliminated	Wrestler	Eliminated by	Method	Times
1	Samoa Joe	Drew McIntyre	Claymore	0:35
2	Finn Bálor	Rey Mysterio	Frog Splash	12:03
3	Dolph Ziggler	Shane McMahon	Coast to Coast	18:10
4	Jeff Hardy	Braun Strowman	Running Powerslam	20:45
5	Rey Mysterio	Braun Strowman	Running Powerslam	21:20
6	The Miz	Braun Strowman	Running Powerslam	22:25
7	Shane McMahon	Braun Strowman	Running Powerslam	24:00
Survivor(s):	Braun Strowman, Drew McIntyre, and Bobby Lashley (Team Raw)			
