= No Mercy (2017) =

WWE pay-per-view and livestreaming event

- Promotional poster featuring Brock Lesnar and Braun Strowman
- Promotion: WWE
- Brand: Raw
- Date: September 24, 2017
- City: Los Angeles, California
- Venue: Staples Center
- Attendance: 16,106

WWE event chronology
← Previous; Mae Young Classic Finale	Next → Hell in a Cell

No Mercy chronology
← Previous; 2016	Next → 2023

The 2017 No Mercy was a professional wrestling pay-per-view (PPV) and livestreaming event produced by WWE, held exclusively for wrestlers from the promotion's main roster brand, Raw. It was the 13th No Mercy and took place on September 24, 2017, at the Staples Center in Los Angeles, California.

Eight matches were contested at the event, including one on the Kickoff pre-show. In the main event, Brock Lesnar defeated Braun Strowman to retain the Universal Championship. In another marquee match, Roman Reigns defeated John Cena. In other prominent matches, Dean Ambrose and Seth Rollins defeated Cesaro and Sheamus to retain the Raw Tag Team Championship and Alexa Bliss defeated Bayley, Emma, Nia Jax, and Sasha Banks in a fatal five-way match to retain the Raw Women's Championship.

This was the final No Mercy held until 2023. Although No Mercy was not on WWE's originally planned 2018 schedule, brand-exclusive PPV and livestreaming events for the main roster were discontinued following WrestleMania 34 in April that year, reducing the amount of these events produced per year. In 2023, No Mercy was reinstated as an annual livestreaming event for WWE's developmental brand, NXT.

== Production ==
=== Background ===
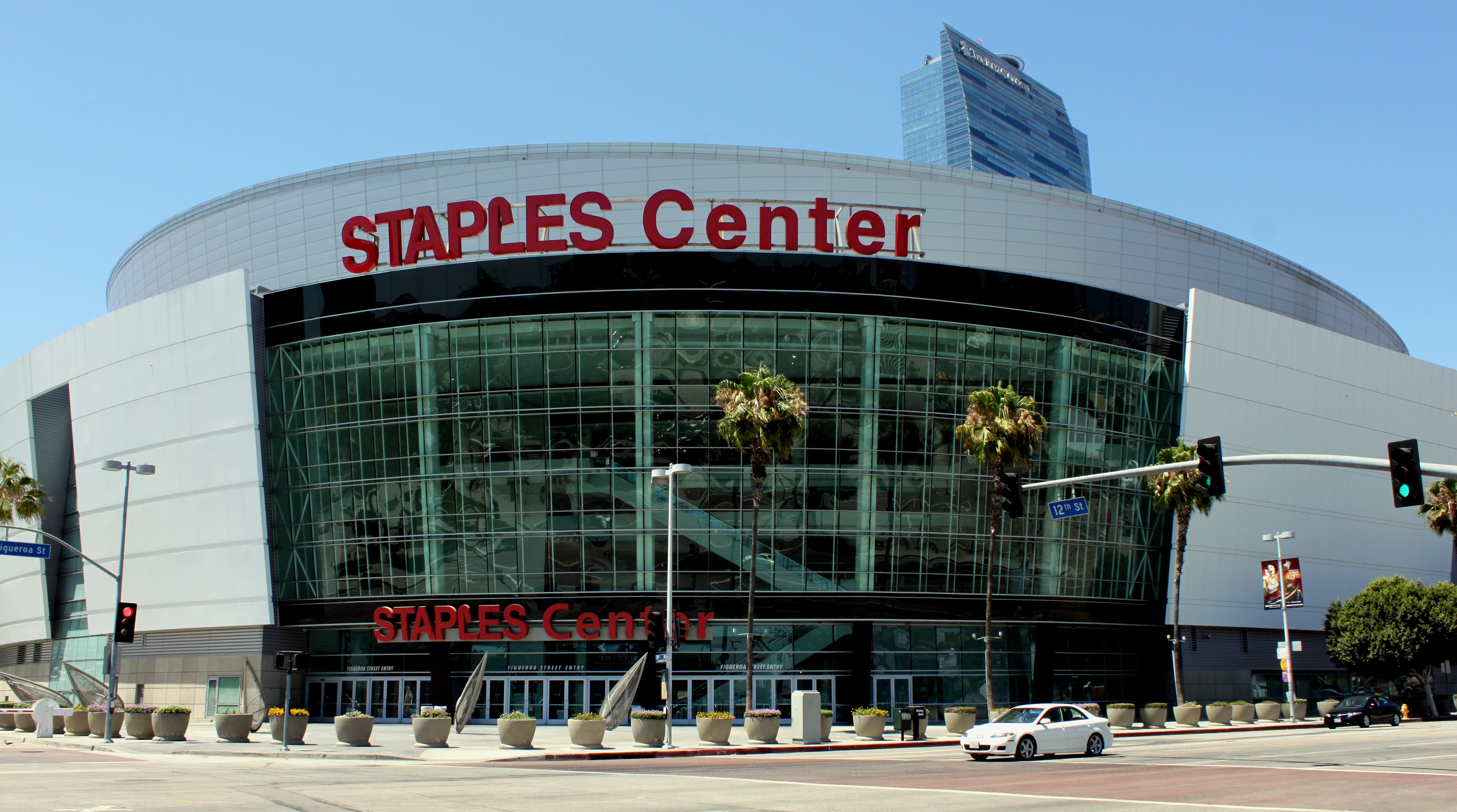
The 13th No Mercy was held at the Staples Center in Los Angeles, California.

No Mercy was first held by WWE as a United Kingdom-exclusive professional wrestling pay-per-view (PPV) event in May 1999, before it became the promotion's annual October PPV that same year, but held in the United States, until 2008. No Mercy was discontinued in 2009 but it was reinstated in October 2016 following the reintroduction of the brand extension, and that event was the first to be available via livestreaming on the WWE Network. On May 11, 2017, it was announced that the 13th No Mercy would move the event to September, taking place on September 24, 2017, at Staples Center in Los Angeles, California. Tickets went on sale on July 15. While the 2016 event featured wrestlers exclusively from the SmackDown brand, the 2017 event was Raw-exclusive.

=== Storylines ===
The event comprised eight matches, including one on the Kickoff pre-show, that resulted from scripted storylines. Results were predetermined by WWE's writers on the Raw brand, while storylines were produced on WWE's weekly television shows, Monday Night Raw and the cruiserweight-exclusive 205 Live.

At SummerSlam, Brock Lesnar defeated Braun Strowman, Roman Reigns, and Samoa Joe in a fatal four-way match to retain the Universal Championship. The following night on Raw, Lesnar's victory celebration with his advocate Paul Heyman was interrupted by Strowman, who attacked Lesnar with a Chokeslam and two Running Powerslams. Later on the show, a Universal Championship title match between the two was scheduled for No Mercy. The following week, Lesnar and Heyman issued a warning to Strowman. On the September 4 episode, after Strowman defeated Big Show in a Steel Cage match, Strowman also warned Lesnar before throwing Big Show through the cage. In a confrontation the following week, Lesnar attacked Strowman with a German Suplex but Strowman quickly performed a Chokeslam and Running Powerslam on Lesnar, hoisting the title over Lesnar. In a split-screen interview on the final Raw before No Mercy, Lesnar thanked Strowman for being a "great challenge", stating that is when he is at his best.

On the August 21 episode of Raw, John Cena made his return to the Raw brand due to his status as a free agent and called out Roman Reigns, who was the reason Cena came to Raw. Reigns came out to confront Cena, but they were interrupted by The Miz and Samoa Joe, resulting in a tag team match, in which Cena and Reigns defeated Miz and Joe. On August 28, a match between Cena and Reigns was made official for No Mercy. During the contract signing for the match that night on Raw, Cena immediately signed the contract while Reigns was more reluctant. After a heated worked shoot argument about Reigns being the new "John Cena" and the two not respecting each other, Luke Gallows and Karl Anderson interrupted and challenged Reigns and Cena to an impromptu tag team match which Cena and Reigns won. The following week, Reigns confronted Cena, who had just defeated Jason Jordan, and wondered why a rookie gave the sixteen-time world champion a hard time. Reigns tried to goad Cena into a fight, but Cena refused and Reigns left, claiming that Cena did not back up his own words. The following week, Reigns defeated Jordan. Cena confronted Reigns, stating that Reigns also had a hard time defeating Jordan. On the final Raw before No Mercy, Reigns insulted Cena for being absent and compared him to The Rock, whom Cena had criticized for leaving WWE for Hollywood several years ago.

At SummerSlam, Sasha Banks defeated Alexa Bliss to win the Raw Women's Championship for a record tying fourth time. The following night on Raw, Bliss interrupted Banks' victory celebration to demand a rematch for the following week and teased Banks by pointing out that Banks had lost all her previous three championships in her first title defense. In the rematch, Bliss recaptured the championship. After the match, Nia Jax congratulated Bliss, but then attacked her, indicating her desire for a title match. The following week, Banks invoked her rematch clause for No Mercy. Jax and Emma, however, both confronted and demanded from General Manager Kurt Angle a championship match. Angle scheduled Jax and Emma to face Bliss and Banks in a tag team match where if they won, they would be added to the title match at No Mercy. Jax and Emma subsequently defeated Bliss and Banks to make the Raw Women's Championship match at No Mercy a fatal four-way match. The following week, Banks defeated Emma with Bliss and Jax on commentary. On the final Raw before No Mercy, Jax faced Bliss in a non-title match. Bliss tried to leave the ring, but was stopped by Banks and Jax defeated Bliss. After the match, Banks, Bliss, and the returning Bayley attacked Jax. Later that night, Bayley was added to the championship match, making it a fatal five-way match at No Mercy.

At SummerSlam, Dean Ambrose and Seth Rollins captured the Raw Tag Team Championship from Cesaro and Sheamus. The following night on Raw, The Hardy Boyz (Jeff Hardy and Matt Hardy) congratulated Ambrose and Rollins and challenged them to a non-title match that Ambrose and Rollins won. The following week, Cesaro defeated Rollins after being distracted by Sheamus, and Ambrose defeated Sheamus after Rollins got involved. Cesaro and Sheamus then invoked their rematch clause for No Mercy.

At SummerSlam, Finn Bálor, wrestling in his "Demon King" persona, defeated Bray Wyatt. A couple of weeks later on Raw, Wyatt, who was not involved in the match, caused Bálor's elimination from a battle royal to determine the number one contender for the Intercontinental Championship. The following week, Bálor addressed Wyatt's interference before he was confronted by Wyatt, who said that it was not Bálor, but the Demon King who defeated him at SummerSlam, and challenged "the real Finn Bálor" to a match at No Mercy, which Bálor accepted. On the September 11 episode, after Wyatt defeated Goldust, he attempted to wipe off Goldust's face paint, but Bálor came to the rescue and Wyatt retreated. The following week, Goldust, as Dustin Rhodes, was granted a rematch with Wyatt, but was unsuccessful. Afterwards, Bálor appeared on the TitanTron. He said that man had created demons, and asked Wyatt which one was more dangerous, and said Wyatt would find out at No Mercy.

On the SummerSlam Kickoff pre-show, Neville defeated Akira Tozawa to recapture the WWE Cruiserweight Championship. On the following episode of 205 Live, Tozawa was unsuccessful in a championship rematch. After the match, Enzo Amore, who was moved to the cruiserweight division, debuted on 205 Live and confronted Neville. After Amore, Cedric Alexander, and Gran Metalik won a six-man tag team match against Noam Dar, Drew Gulak, and Tony Nese, Neville informed the winners that they had qualified for a fatal five-way elimination match, which also included Nese and The Brian Kendrick, the following night on 205 Live. Amore won the match after last eliminating Alexander, and earned a title opportunity at No Mercy. The following week on Raw, after Braun Strowman attacked Amore, Neville came out and performed the Red Arrow on Amore. The following night on 205 Live, a confrontation between Amore and Neville ended with Amore attacking Neville with a low blow.

On the September 18 episode of Raw, Intercontinental Champion The Miz interrupted General Manager Kurt Angle, who was advertising No Mercy's two headlining matches. Miz complained that he was without a title defense for the second straight pay-per-view. Angle then scheduled a fatal four-way match involving Jeff Hardy, Matt Hardy, Elias, and Angle's (storyline) son Jason Jordan to determine Miz's challenger for No Mercy. Miz criticized Jordan's entry into the match, calling Angle a poor father and demanded for The Miztourage (Bo Dallas and Curtis Axel) to be added as well. After Jordan also insisted on this, Angle agreed, making it a six-pack challenge that Jordan ultimately won. After the match, The Miztourage and Miz attacked Jordan.

On September 22, a match between Apollo Crews and Elias was scheduled for the No Mercy Kickoff pre-show.

== Event ==
Other on-screen personnel
Role:	Name:
English commentators	Michael Cole
English commentators	Corey Graves
English commentators	Booker T
English commentators	Vic Joseph (Cruiserweight match)
Spanish commentators	Carlos Cabrera
Spanish commentators	Marcelo Rodríguez
German commentators	Carsten Schaefer
German commentators	Tim Haber
German commentators	Calvin Knie
Ring announcer	JoJo
Referees	John Cone
Referees	Darrick Moore
Referees	Chad Patton
Referees	Rod Zapata
Interviewers	Renee Young
Interviewers	Charly Caruso
Interviewers	Mike Rome
Pre-show panel	Renee Young
Pre-show panel	Sam Roberts
Pre-show panel	Jerry Lawler
Pre-show panel	David Otunga
Raw Talk panel	Renee Young
Raw Talk panel	Jerry Lawler

=== Pre-show ===
During the No Mercy Kickoff pre-show, Elias faced Apollo Crews. Elias performed "Drift Away" on Crews to win the match.

Also during the pre-show, it was advertised that NXT's Asuka would make her main roster debut at TLC: Tables, Ladders & Chairs.

=== Preliminary matches ===
The actual pay-per-view opened with The Miz (accompanied by Curtis Axel and Bo Dallas) defending the Intercontinental Championship against Jason Jordan. In the end, Dallas distracted the referee, allowing Axel to attack Jordan. Miz then executed the "Skull Crushing Finale" on Jordan to retain the title.

Next, Bray Wyatt fought Finn Bálor. Before the match, Wyatt attacked Bálor. As officials tendered to Bálor, Wyatt called him a coward, which prompted Bálor to return to compete and the match began. In the end, Bálor executed the "Coup de Gráce" on Wyatt for the win.

After that, Dean Ambrose and Seth Rollins defended the Raw Tag Team Championship against Cesaro and Sheamus. During the match, Cesaro accidentally hit his mouth on the ring post, damaging his front two teeth. In the end, Sheamus attempted the "Brogue Kick" on Ambrose, but Ambrose avoided and Sheamus accidentally performed the "Brogue Kick" on Cesaro. Rollins then performed the "Ripcord Knee" on Sheamus, which was followed by Ambrose performing "Dirty Deeds" on Sheamus to retain the titles.

In the fourth match, Alexa Bliss defended the Raw Women's Championship in a fatal five-way match against Nia Jax, Sasha Banks, Emma, and Bayley. During the match, Jax dominated, including performing a Samoan drop on Bliss and Banks at the same time. Jax was then taken out momentarily following a powerbomb by Bayley and Emma from the ring apron onto the floor. In the closing moments, after more back and forth action, Jax returned and performed a leg drop on Banks, but Bliss and Emma broke up the pin. Bliss sent Jax into the ring post, sent Bayley into Emma, and performed a Snap DDT on Bayley to retain the title.

Afterwards, John Cena fought Roman Reigns. Cena performed an "Attitude Adjustment" on Reigns for a near-fall. Reigns performed a "Superman Punch" on Cena for a near-fall. Cena executed a Super "Attitude Adjustment" on Reigns for another near-fall. Reigns performed a Spear on Cena through an announce table and scored a near-fall. Cena performed two consecutive "Attitude Adjustments" on Reigns for another near-fall. In the climax, Reigns executed a "Superman Punch" and a Spear on Cena to win the match. Afterwards, Cena showed respect and endorsed Reigns.

In the penultimate match, Neville defended the WWE Cruiserweight Championship against Enzo Amore. In the end, Amore retrieved the title and acted as if he was going to use it as a weapon, but the referee confiscated the belt. As the referee was returning the belt to ringside officials, Amore performed a low blow on Neville and pinned Neville with a roll up to win the title.

=== Main event ===
In the main event, Brock Lesnar (accompanied by Paul Heyman) defended the Universal Championship against Braun Strowman. Lesnar performed a German Suplex on Strowman, but Strowman immediately performed a Chokeslam and a Running Powerslam on Lesnar for a near-fall. Lesnar applied a "Kimura Lock" but Strowman touched the ropes to break the hold. Strowman performed two Running Powerslams on Lesnar for a near-fall. Lesnar then performed an "F-5" on Strowman to retain the title.

== Reception ==
The event received mixed critical reception, with general praise being directed at the matches, in particular the tag team match, with criticism being directed towards the booking of Lesnar/Strowman, in addition to the conclusion of Neville's title reign. Cesaro in particular received critical praise from both fans and fellow wrestlers for his toughness after losing his two front teeth, and reportedly received a standing ovation upon returning backstage after his match.

Dave Meltzer, speaking on the Wrestling Observer Radio, called the main event "a huge disappointment", and said that the match went against Strowman's character and performance strengths, referring to his SummerSlam and Great Balls of Fire matches in particular. Despite the negative aspects of the show, including partner Bryan Alvarez comparing the Lesnar/Strowman "wrestling match" to their well received "car crash" Summerslam encounter, Meltzer called No Mercy "a good show".

== Aftermath ==
WWE released a statement on Cesaro's medical condition, stating "Cesaro's teeth were pushed up into his upper jaw by about 3 to 4mm... the next step is most likely removing the teeth and then having some implants made".

Immediately after No Mercy on Raw Talk, John Cena said that Roman Reigns had earned his respect and it was now up to Reigns to continue his momentum forward. He also confirmed that he would be taking some time off. The following night's Raw opened with a segment of Miz TV with Reigns as The Miz's guest where Reigns also said that Cena had earned his respect. Miz said that despite Reigns' victory, he was the one with a championship as he retained his Intercontinental Championship against Jason Jordan. After some arguing, a match between the two was scheduled where Reigns defeated Miz, but after the match, Miz and The Miztourage attacked Reigns. Also that night, Jordan teamed with Matt Hardy in a winning effort over The Miztourage. Dean Ambrose, Seth Rollins, Cesaro, Sheamus, and Braun Strowman were then intertwined in this new rivalry between Reigns and Miz, resulting in The Shield reuniting and taking on the team of The Miz, Strowman, Cesaro, and Sheamus at TLC: Tables, Ladders & Chairs in a 4-on-3 handicap Tables, Ladders, and Chairs match. Kane returned and was added as the fifth member of The Miz's team at TLC.

Enzo Amore had General Manager Kurt Angle sign a no-contact clause, which meant that if any cruiserweight laid their hands on Amore, they could not challenge for the WWE Cruiserweight Championship. Later, Amore's championship celebration was interrupted by the entire cruiserweight division. Amore claimed that he made 205 Live relevant, supported by the fact that they were being featured for the first time as the main event of Raw. Neville said that Amore had made a joke out of the entire division and attacked Amore in spite of the no-contact clause. Immediately after Raw on the WWE Network, Braun Strowman came out and powerslammed Amore and let the entire cruiserweight division each take a shot at him. On 205 Live, Amore said that due to the no-contact clause, none of the cruiserweights could challenge him for the title. Neville also explained that he knew that he risked his title rematch, but did not care and would do it again. Neville then faced Ariya Daivari, who tried to befriend Amore, and Neville won by disqualification after Amore attacked Neville with his crutch and continued to attack him after the match.

Also on Raw Talk, Alexa Bliss said that she had retained the Raw Women's Championship against the entire women's division with the exception of Alicia Fox and Mickie James, who she felt were not worthy to be considered title contenders, especially James, who she said was too old. She also said she looked forward to ending Asuka's undefeated streak. The following night on Raw, James confronted Bliss about her comments on Raw Talk. After Bliss restated her comments, James attacked her and a Raw Women's Championship match between the two was scheduled for TLC. Also in the women's division, Sasha Banks and Bayley teamed up and defeated Emma and Nia Jax. Emma then earned the right to face Asuka at TLC.

Finn Bálor was interviewed backstage. He thanked Bray Wyatt for their No Mercy match and said he would now focus on regaining the Universal Championship. However, later in the show after a match with Goldust, as Bálor stood in the center of the ring celebrating, the lights went out and a child began singing Wyatt's song, "He's Got the Whole World in His Hands". A rematch between Bálor as his newly created demon and Wyatt, embodying "Sister Abigail", was made for TLC. However, Bray was pulled from the match due to a viral infection, and was replaced by SmackDown's AJ Styles.

This was the final No Mercy held until 2023, as although No Mercy was not on WWE's originally planned schedule for 2018, brand-exclusive PPV and livestreaming events were discontinued following WrestleMania 34 in April that year, reducing the amount of these events produced per year. After six years, however, No Mercy was reinstated in 2023 as an annual livestreaming event for WWE's developmental brand, NXT.

== Results ==
No.	Results	Stipulations	Times
1^{P}	Elias defeated Apollo Crews (with Titus O'Neil) by pinfall	Singles match	8:35
2	The Miz (c) (with Bo Dallas and Curtis Axel) defeated Jason Jordan by pinfall	Singles match for the WWE Intercontinental Championship	10:15
3	Finn Bálor defeated Bray Wyatt by pinfall	Singles match	11:35
4	Dean Ambrose and Seth Rollins (c) defeated Cesaro and Sheamus by pinfall	Tag team match for the WWE Raw Tag Team Championship	15:55
5	Alexa Bliss (c) defeated Bayley, Emma, Nia Jax, and Sasha Banks by pinfall	Fatal 5-Way match for the WWE Raw Women's Championship	9:40
6	Roman Reigns defeated John Cena by pinfall	Singles match	22:05
7	Enzo Amore defeated Neville (c) by pinfall	Singles match for the WWE Cruiserweight Championship	10:40
8	Brock Lesnar (c) (with Paul Heyman) defeated Braun Strowman by pinfall	Singles match for the WWE Universal Championship	9:00
(c) / – the champion(s) heading into the match; P / – the match was broadcast on the pre-show
