= Bray Wyatt =

American professional wrestler (1987–2023)

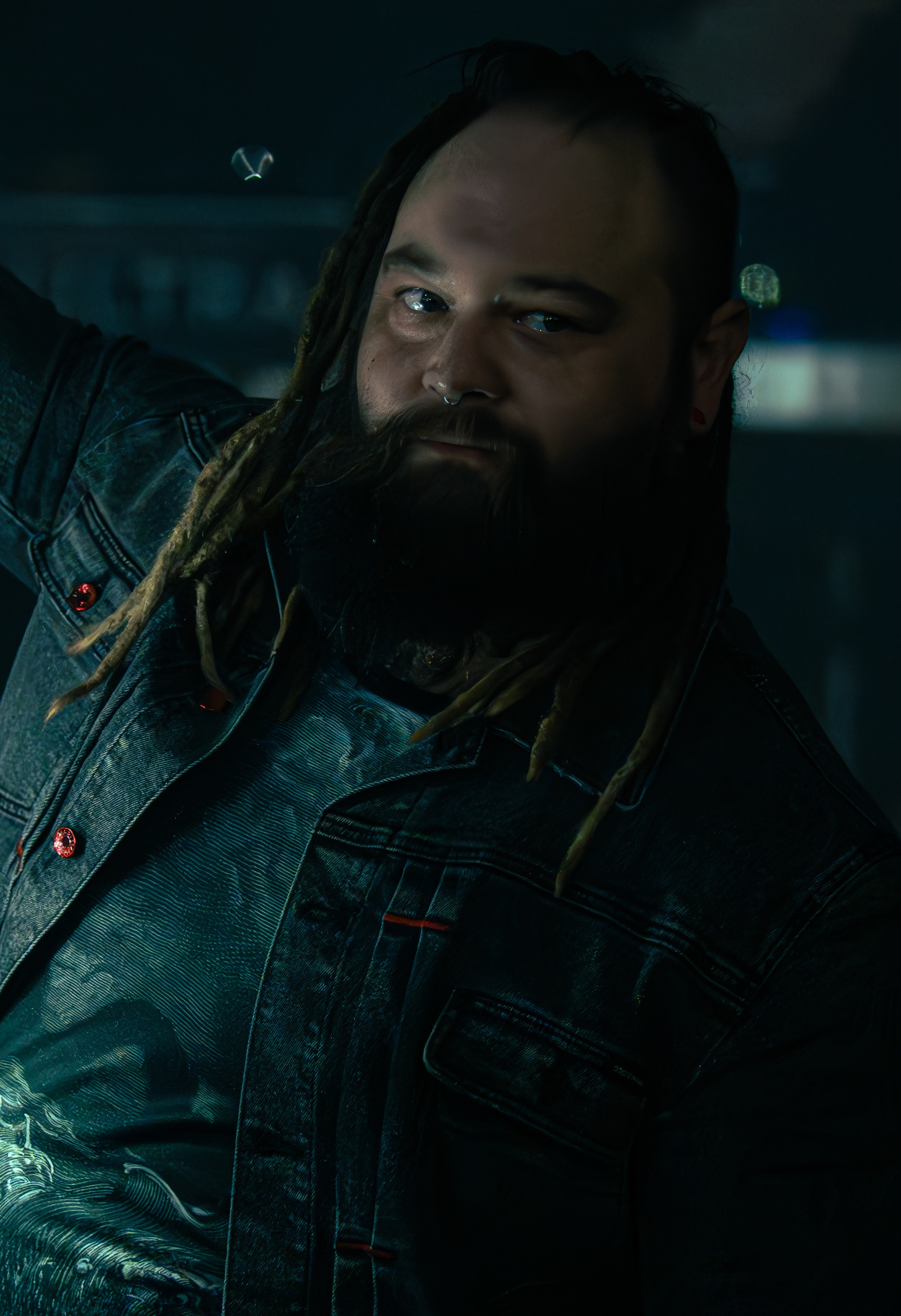
- Wyatt in 2022

Personal information
- Born: Windham Lawrence Rotunda; May 23, 1987 Brooksville, Florida, U.S.
- Died: August 24, 2023 (aged 36) Brooksville, Florida, U.S.
- Spouse: Samantha Pixley (m. 2012; div. 2017)
- Life partners: JoJo Offerman (2017–2023; his death)
- Children: 4
- Father: Mike Rotunda
- Relatives: Bo Dallas (brother); Blackjack Mulligan (grandfather); Barry Windham (uncle); Kendall Windham (uncle)

Professional wrestling career
- Ring names: Alex Rotunda; Axl Mulligan; Bray Wyatt; Duke Rotundo; The Fiend; Husky Harris; Tank Mulligan; Tank Rotundo
- Billed height: 6 ft 3 in (191 cm)
- Billed weight: 285 lb (129 kg)
- Billed from: Brooksville, Florida; Lafayette, Louisiana; Alabaster, Alabama
- Trained by: Barry Windham; Florida Championship Wrestling; NXT
- Debut: February 5, 2009

Windham Lawrence Rotunda (May 23, 1987 – August 24, 2023), better known by his ring name Bray Wyatt, was an American professional wrestler. He was best known for his tenures in WWE from 2009 to 2021 and again from 2022 until his death in 2023.

Rotunda was a third-generation wrestler, as his grandfather Blackjack Mulligan, his father Mike Rotunda, and his uncles Barry and Kendall Windham were all fellow wrestlers. His younger brother, Taylor Rotunda, also worked with WWE on two separate tenures under the ring names Bo Dallas and his alter ego Uncle Howdy. Alongside his brother, he held the FCW Florida Tag Team Championship twice while in WWE's then-developmental territory, Florida Championship Wrestling (FCW). He wrestled under various ring names between 2008 and 2012 in FCW, and wrestled on WWE's main roster from 2010 to 2011 as a member of The Nexus under the ring name Husky Harris.

After returning to WWE's developmental territory, which had been rebranded as NXT, Rotunda was repackaged as Bray Wyatt. Portrayed as the villainous leader of a bayou-dwelling cult called The Wyatt Family, he returned to the main roster alongside Wyatt Family stablemates Luke Harper and Erick Rowan in 2013. He subsequently became a one-time WWE Champion, two-time WWE Universal Champion, one-time SmackDown Tag Team Champion (alongside Harper and brief Wyatt Family member Randy Orton under the Freebird Rule), and one-time Raw Tag Team Champion (with Matt Hardy).

After a hiatus from August 2018 to April 2019, Wyatt returned with a new split personality gimmick, which saw him switch between the two characters of a Mr. Rogers-esque children's television host named after himself, and a grotesque monster resembling an evil clown called The Fiend (previously known as "The Fiend" Bray Wyatt). He was released from WWE in July 2021, but returned at the Extreme Rules event in October 2022 with a new character that claimed to be his "real-life" self, though he gradually reincorporated his previous personalities in addition to new ones. In what would become his only televised match during this return, he defeated LA Knight in the 2023 Royal Rumble in January. He took a medical hiatus in February due to a COVID-19 infection, and died of a heart attack in August at the age of 36.

== Early life ==
Windham Lawrence Rotunda was born in Brooksville, Florida, on May 23, 1987. His younger brother, Taylor, is also a wrestler, who was employed with WWE on two different tenures, most recently performing under the ring name Uncle Howdy, and previously as Bo Dallas with the company. He attended Hernando High School, where he won a state wrestling championship at 275 pounds (125 kg) in 2005, the year of his graduation. He also played football as a defensive tackle and guard. Rotunda played at the College of the Sequoias for two seasons, earning second-team All-American honors as a sophomore offensive guard at the California junior college. He earned a football scholarship to Troy University, where he played college football for two years. He left Troy 27 credit hours short of earning a bachelor's degree after deciding to become a professional wrestler.

== Professional wrestling career ==
=== World Wrestling Entertainment / WWE (2009–2021; 2022–2023) ===
==== Developmental territories (2009–2010) ====
Making his debut in a dark match on the February 5, 2009, episode of Florida Championship Wrestling (FCW), he would work under the names Alex Rotundo and Duke Rotundo. In June 2009, he began teaming with his brother Bo Rotundo, winning the FCW Florida Tag Team Championship. On June 2, 2010, he joined NXT, a WWE show where a developmental wrestler, named Rookie was paired with a WWE wrestler, called Pro, under the name Husky Harris, with Cody Rhodes as his Pro. He was eliminated from the competition on August 17. Harris reappeared in the season finale of NXT with the other eliminated rookies and joined in on the attack on the NXT winner, Kaval.

While on NXT, Rotunda continued wrestling in FCW while retaining the Husky Harris ring name. In September 2010 following his elimination from NXT, Harris began a feud in FCW with Percy Watson when he attacked Watson while teaming with him in a tag team match, which led to Watson being pinned for the loss. When Harris and Watson faced off in a match, they were both counted out as they brawled out of the arena, which led to a no disqualification match that Harris lost. The feud ended in October, with Harris defeating Watson in a lumberjack match.

==== The Nexus (2010–2011) ====
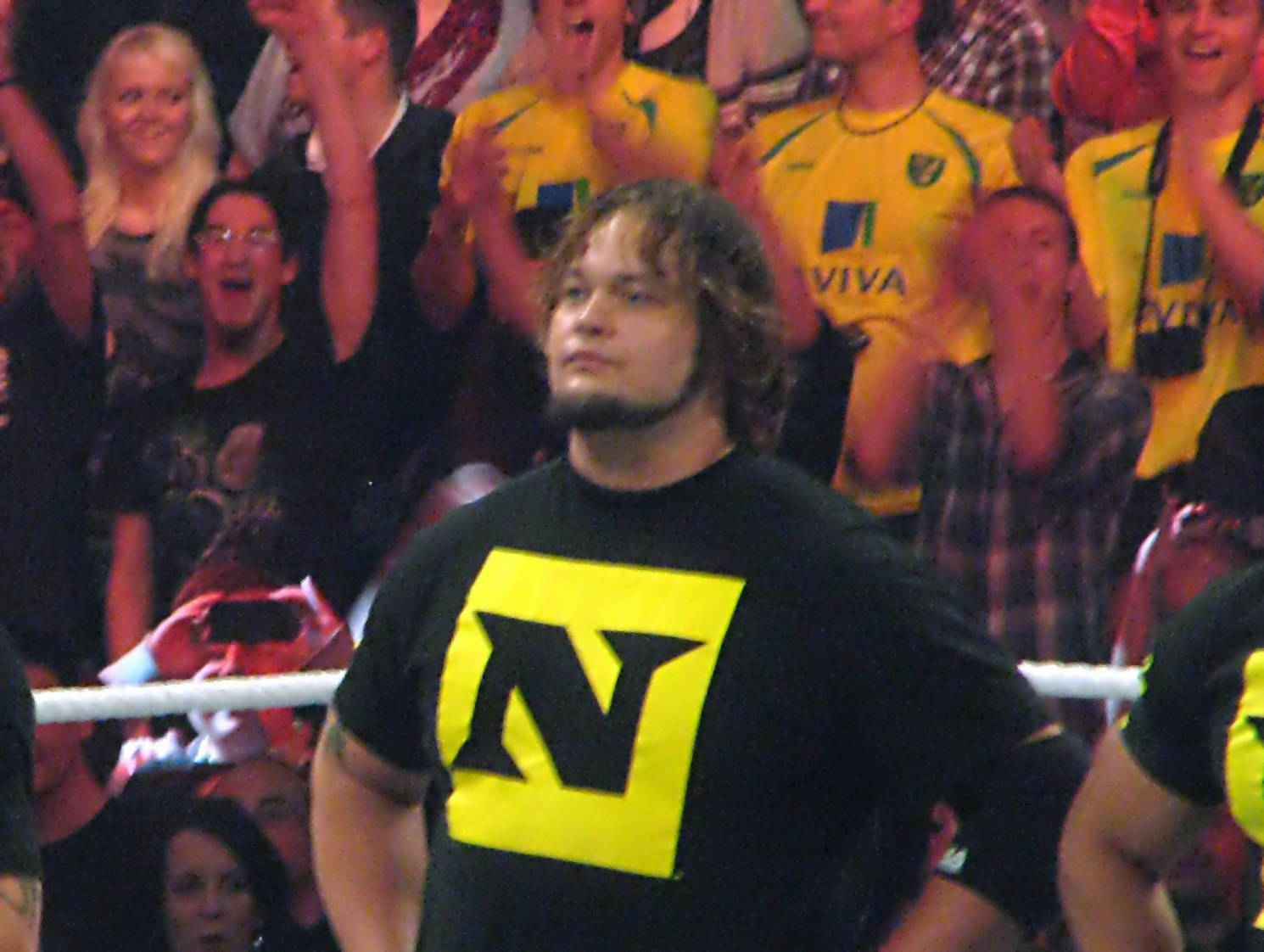
Rotunda as Husky Harris during his tenure as part of The Nexus in November 2010

At the Hell in a Cell pay-per-view on October 4, a disguised Harris and Michael McGillicutty interfered in a match between John Cena and Wade Barrett, and helped Barrett win, forcing Cena to join Barrett's faction The Nexus per the pre-match stipulation, becoming members of The Nexus weeks later. He worked as a member of The Nexus, including when CM Punk became the new leader of the stable until the January 31 episode of Raw, when Harris was written off television after Randy Orton punted him in the head.

==== Return to FCW (2011–2012) ====
Following the punt by Orton on Raw, Rotunda returned to FCW and in March 2011 adopted the gimmick of the hockey mask-wearing Axl Mulligan, but the character never made it to FCW TV, and Rotunda continued to play the Husky Harris character on FCW TV. In August 2011, Harris became embroiled in his brother Bo's (then FCW Florida Heavyweight Champion) feud with Lucky Cannon and Damien Sandow. The two brothers later teamed up to defeat Cannon and Sandow. Later, Harris voiced his displeasure of Bo's relationship with Aksana, and when Bo suffered a legit injury his title was vacated and a tournament set up to determine the new champion, during which Harris defeated Big E Langston to make it to the final, a fatal four-way match against Dean Ambrose, Leo Kruger and Damien Sandow, which he lost after Richie Steamboat (who was at ringside to aim for Ambrose) performed a superkick on Harris instead.

Despite Aksana managing to get Steamboat to attack Harris again, he still won a triple threat match against Ambrose and Sandow to earn a match for the FCW Florida Heavyweight Championship against Kruger, which Harris lost when he was distracted with Steamboat's interference once again. As a result, Harris and Steamboat began feuding, with their first match ending in a no contest. Kruger later defeated the pair in a triple threat match to retain the title. However, Harris defeated Steamboat in a No Holds Barred match. After the pair continued to frequently attack each other, they were suspended for 30 days. Upon their return, Harris defeated Steamboat in a bullrope match to end their feud. On February 2, 2012, Harris and Bo Rotundo defeated Brad Maddox and Eli Cottonwood to win the vacant FCW Florida Tag Team Championship for the second time. They successfully defended the FCW Florida Tag Team Championship against Antonio Cesaro and Alexander Rusev, but lost the championship to Corey Graves and Jake Carter on March 15.

==== The Wyatt Family (2012–2014) ====
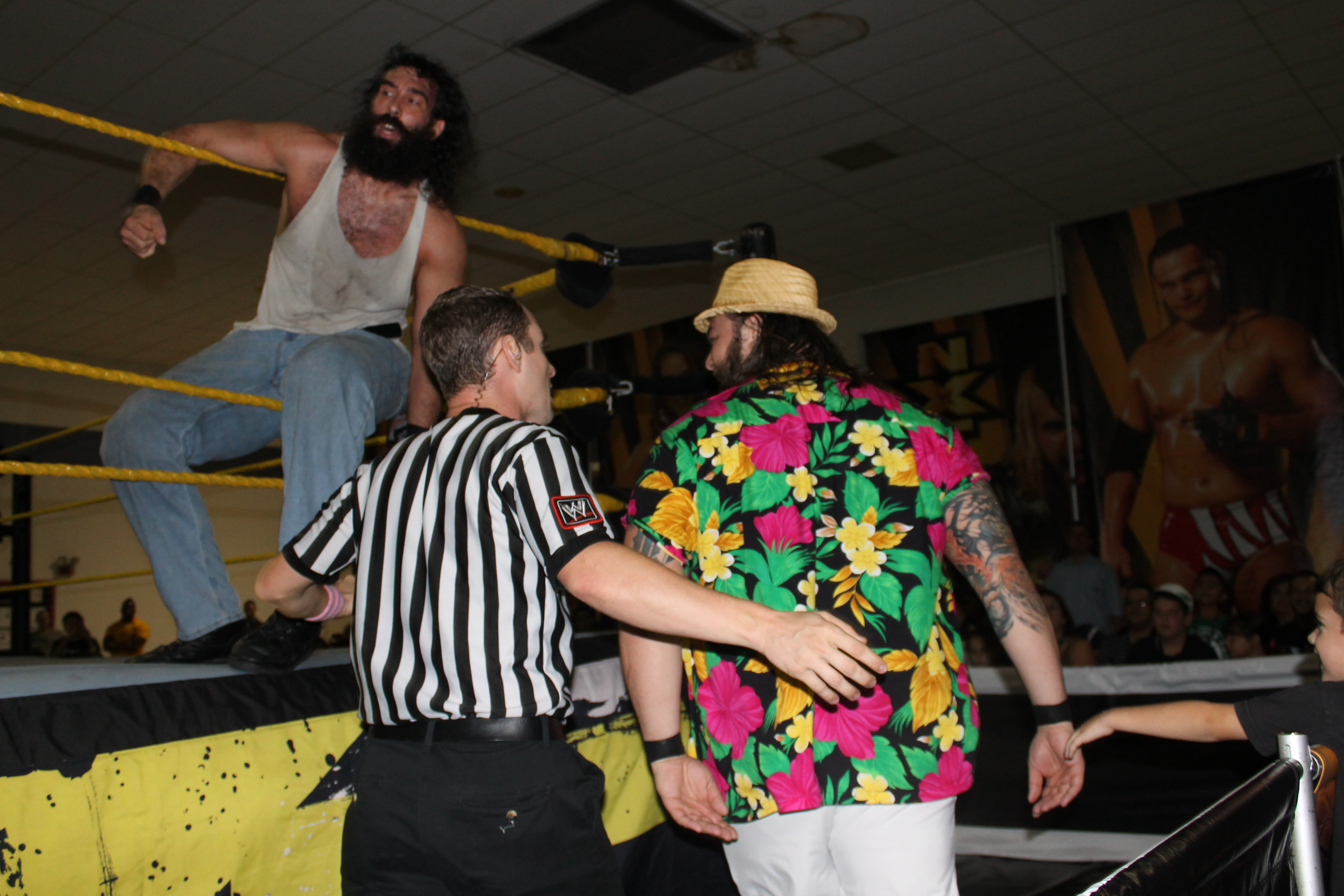
Bray Wyatt (right) and Luke Harper (far left) at an NXT event in October 2012

In April 2012, Rotunda was repackaged as Bray Wyatt, who initially associated himself with Eli Cottonwood in FCW. When WWE rebranded FCW into NXT, Bray Wyatt debuted on the July 11, 2012, episode of the rebooted NXT taped at Full Sail University, where he defeated Aiden English. In July of that year, Wyatt suffered a torn pectoral muscle and required surgery. Despite the injury, Wyatt continued to appear on NXT, founding a faction known as The Wyatt Family in November, with Luke Harper and Erick Rowan. The stable won the NXT Tag Team Championships when Harper and Rowan defeated Adrian Neville and Oliver Grey.

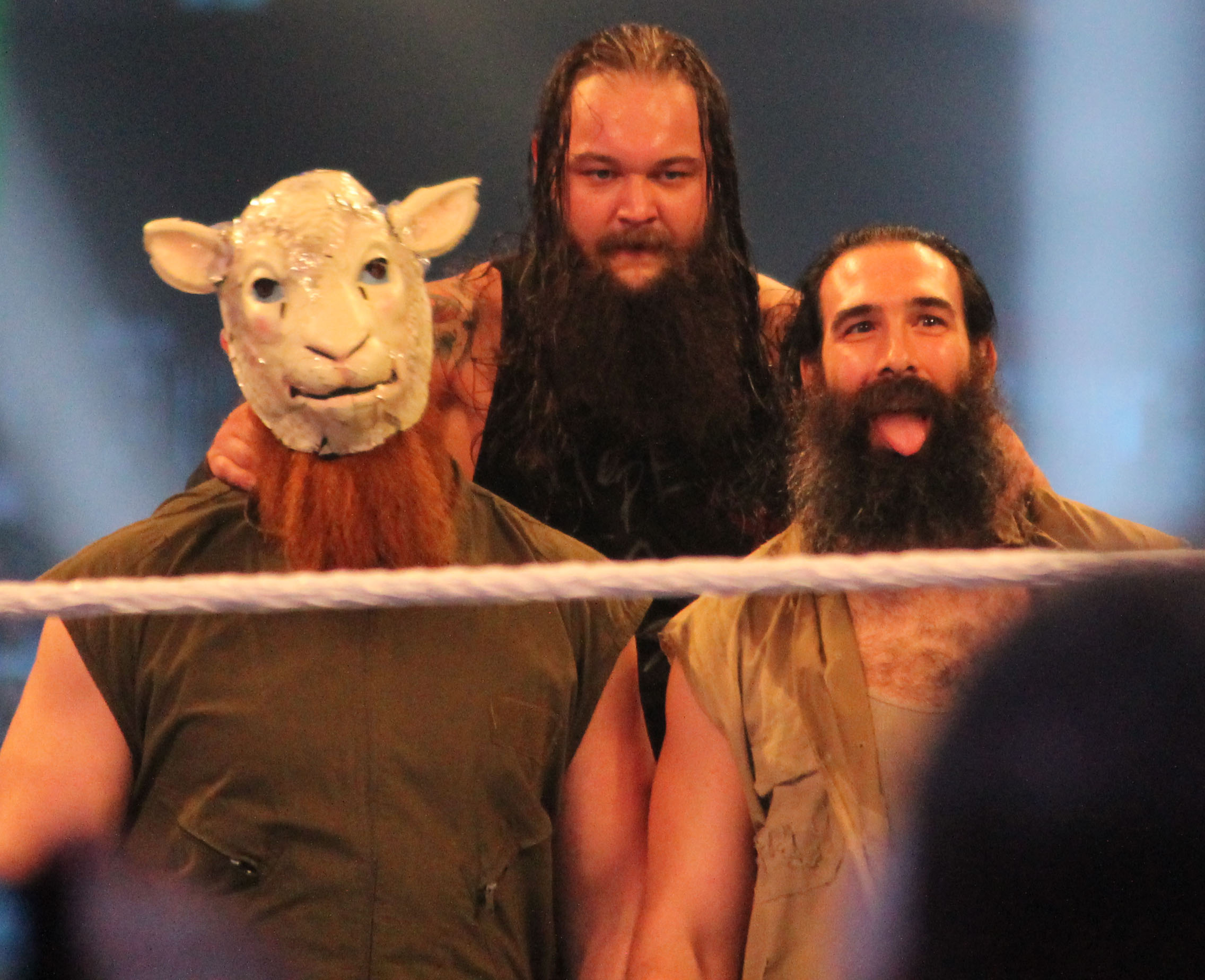
The Wyatt Family at WrestleMania XXX, with Wyatt (center) sitting on the top turnbuckle

From the May 27 episode of Raw, WWE aired vignettes promoting the upcoming debut of The Wyatt Family. The vignettes showed The Wyatt Family's backwoods origins and Rowan wearing a sheep mask. Wyatt's first feud was with Kane, defeating him in a Ring of Fire match at SummerSlam. which he won following interference from Harper and Rowan. Wyatt also defeated Kofi Kingston at Battleground.

Harper and Rowan lost to CM Punk and Daniel Bryan at Survivor Series on November 24. The Wyatt Family defeated Bryan in a handicap match at TLC: Tables, Ladders & Chairs on December 15. On the December 30 episode of Raw, Bryan defeated Harper and Rowan in a gauntlet match so he could face Wyatt, but they interfered for a disqualification and attacked him until Bryan gave up and joined the group. Wyatt punished Bryan after they failed to find success, leading to Bryan attacking the other members of The Wyatt Family on the January 13, 2014 episode of Raw to signal him departing the group. At Royal Rumble on January 26, Wyatt defeated Bryan. Later that night, The Wyatt Family cost John Cena his WWE World Heavyweight Championship match against Randy Orton, with The Wyatt Family attacking Cena afterwards. On the January 27 episode of Raw, The Wyatt Family attacked Bryan, Cena and Sheamus during an Elimination Chamber qualifying match against The Shield, meaning Bryan's team won by disqualification and The Shield lost a chance to enter the Elimination Chamber match. At Elimination Chamber on February 23, The Wyatt Family defeated The Shield. They later interfered in the Elimination Chamber match, which caused Cena to be eliminated.

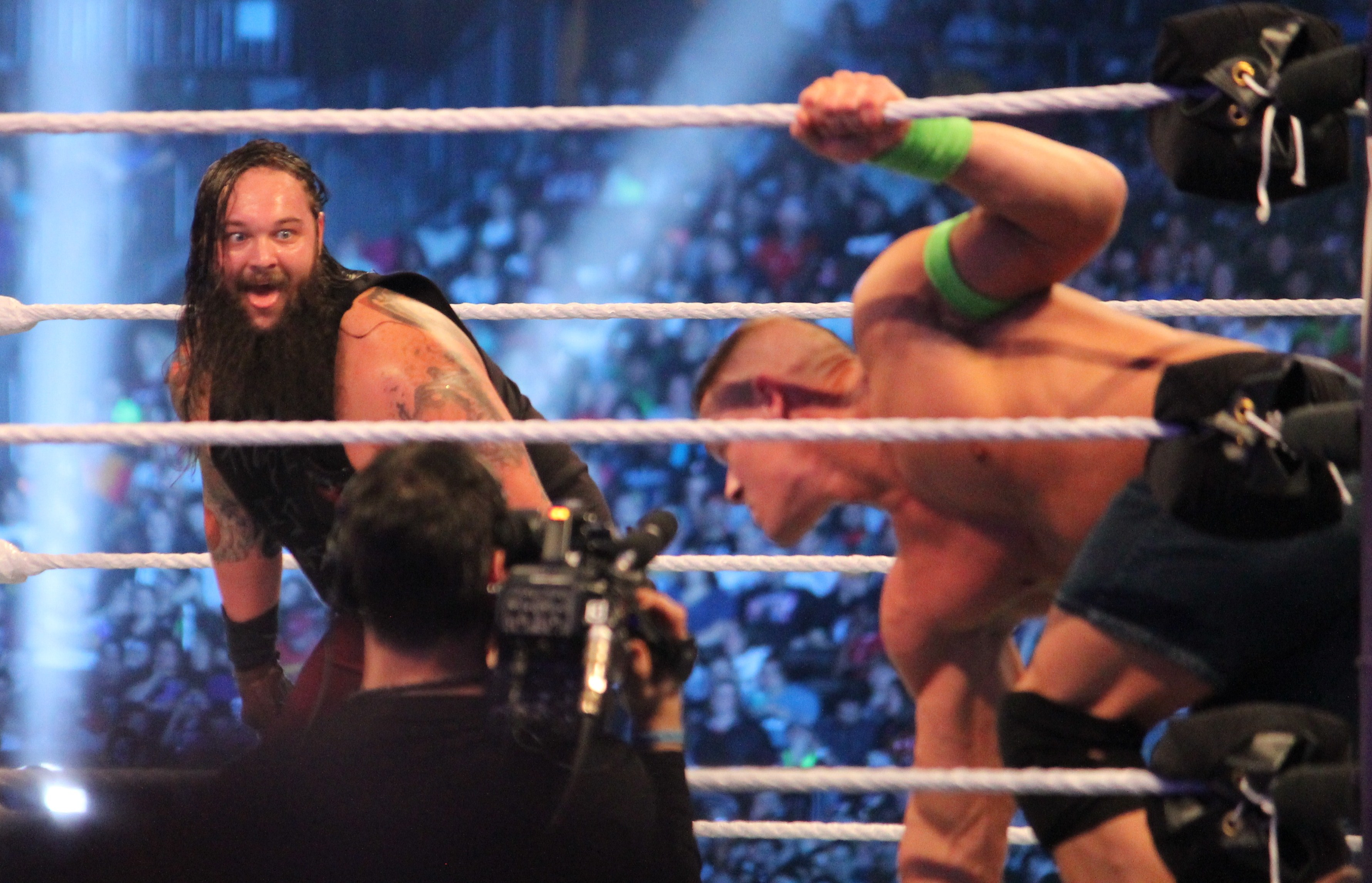
Wyatt (left) facing off against John Cena at WrestleMania XXX in April 2014

After Elimination Chamber, Wyatt feuded with Cena, with Wyatt wanting to prove that Cena's heroic act was a facade characteristic of "this era of lies" while also trying to turn Cena into a "monster". Wyatt was defeated by Cena at WrestleMania XXX. The feud continued at Extreme Rules, where Wyatt defeated Cena in a steel cage match but was defeated in a third match, a Last Man Standing match, at Payback. Wyatt and Cena met again at 2014 Money in the Bank, wrestling in a multi-men ladder match for the vacant WWE World Heavyweight Championship which Cena won.

The following night on Raw, The Wyatt Family attacked a returning Chris Jericho. This led to matches between Wyatt and Jericho at Battleground on July 20, which Jericho won, and at SummerSlam on August 17, where Wyatt won a rematch despite Harper and Rowan being banned from ringside. The feud with Jericho ended on the September 8 episode of Raw, when Wyatt won a steel cage match by escaping the cage.

==== The New Face of Fear (2014–2015) ====
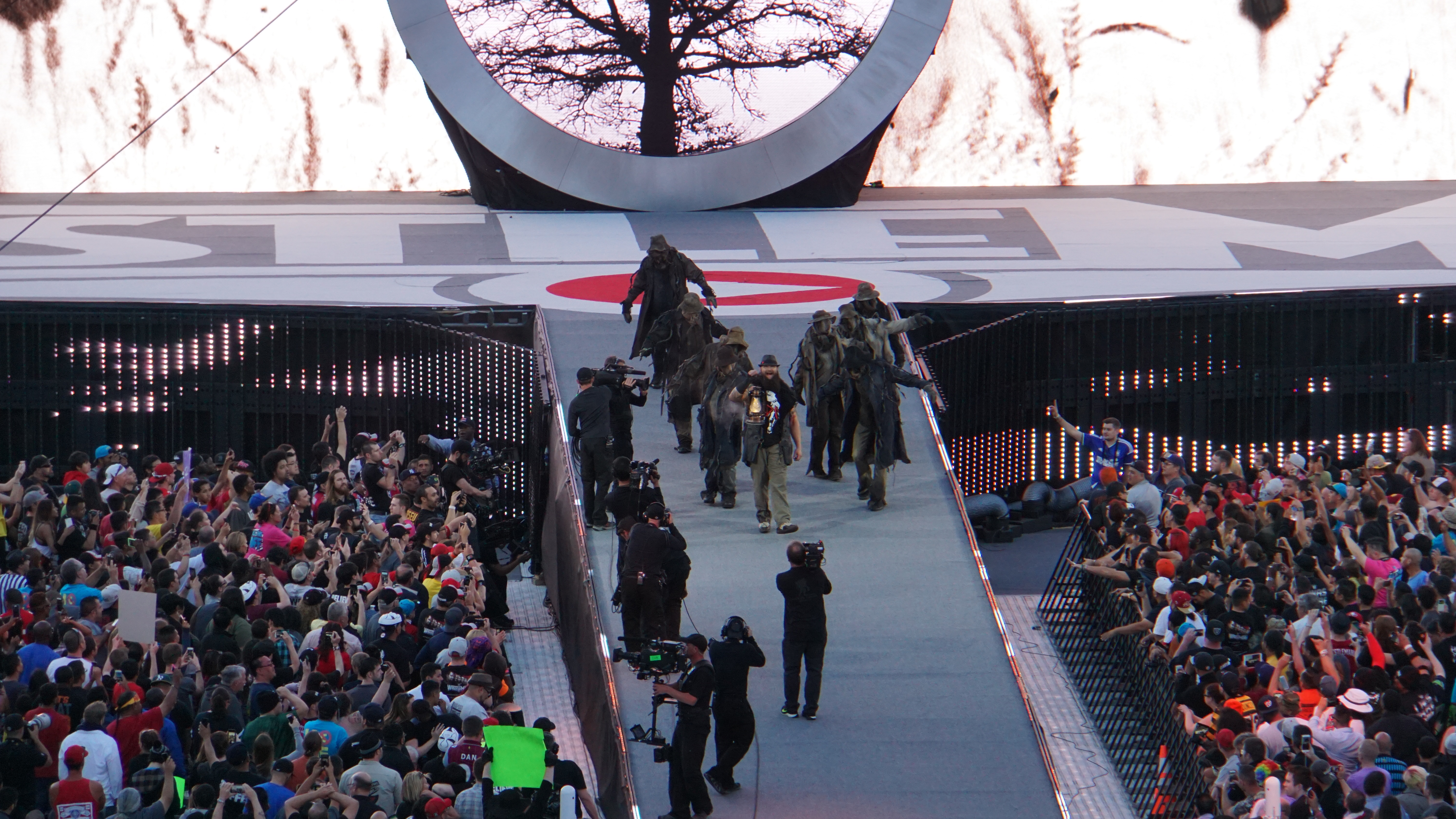
Wyatt making his entrance at WrestleMania 31

Beginning on September 29, vignettes were shown of Wyatt "setting Harper and Rowan free". Wyatt returned alone at Hell in a Cell on October 26 during the main event match between Dean Ambrose and Seth Rollins, costing Ambrose the match. In the following weeks, Wyatt taunted Ambrose while offering to "fix" him like he had done with Harper and Rowan. On November 23 at Survivor Series, Wyatt defeated Ambrose by disqualification after Ambrose used a steel chair to attack Wyatt. At TLC: Tables, Ladders & Chairs on December 14, Wyatt defeated Ambrose in a Tables, Ladders and Chairs match. Wyatt once again defeated Ambrose on the December 22 episode of Raw in a Miracle on 34th Street Fight. The feud culminated in an ambulance match on the January 5, 2015, episode of Raw, which Wyatt won to effectively end their feud.

At Royal Rumble on January 25, Wyatt competed in the Royal Rumble match at #5 and lasted for almost 47 minutes, eliminating six other contestants before being eliminated by Big Show and Kane. Following the Royal Rumble, Wyatt began a series of cryptic promos, referring himself as "The New Face of Fear"; at Fastlane on February 22, Wyatt emerged from a casket and challenged The Undertaker for a match at WrestleMania 31 on March 29, which The Undertaker accepted, but Wyatt was unsuccessful in defeating The Undertaker. Wyatt defeated Ryback at Payback on May 17.

==== Revival of The Wyatt Family (2015–2016) ====
At Money in the Bank on June 14, Wyatt interfered in the Money in the Bank ladder match and attacked Roman Reigns (who had defeated him in a qualification match on Raw) as Reigns was close to retrieving the briefcase. At Battleground on July 19, Wyatt defeated Reigns with the help of former Wyatt Family member Luke Harper, reforming the team (without the injured Erick Rowan who soon returned). At SummerSlam on August 23, Wyatt and Harper lost to Reigns and Ambrose. The following night on Raw, Wyatt introduced a new Wyatt Family member named Braun Strowman, who attacked Ambrose and Reigns. At Night of Champions on September 20, The Wyatt Family defeated Reigns, Ambrose and Jericho. At Hell in a Cell on October 25, Wyatt lost to Reigns in a Hell in a Cell match to end their feud; later that night The Wyatt Family attacked The Undertaker after his Hell in a Cell match with Brock Lesnar and carried him backstage, reigniting their feud. The next night on Raw, Wyatt was confronted by former rival Kane, who was attacked by the Wyatts and also carried backstage. On the November 9 episode of Raw, The Brothers of Destruction returned and attacked The Wyatt Family. At Survivor Series on November 22, Wyatt and Harper lost to The Brothers of Destruction.

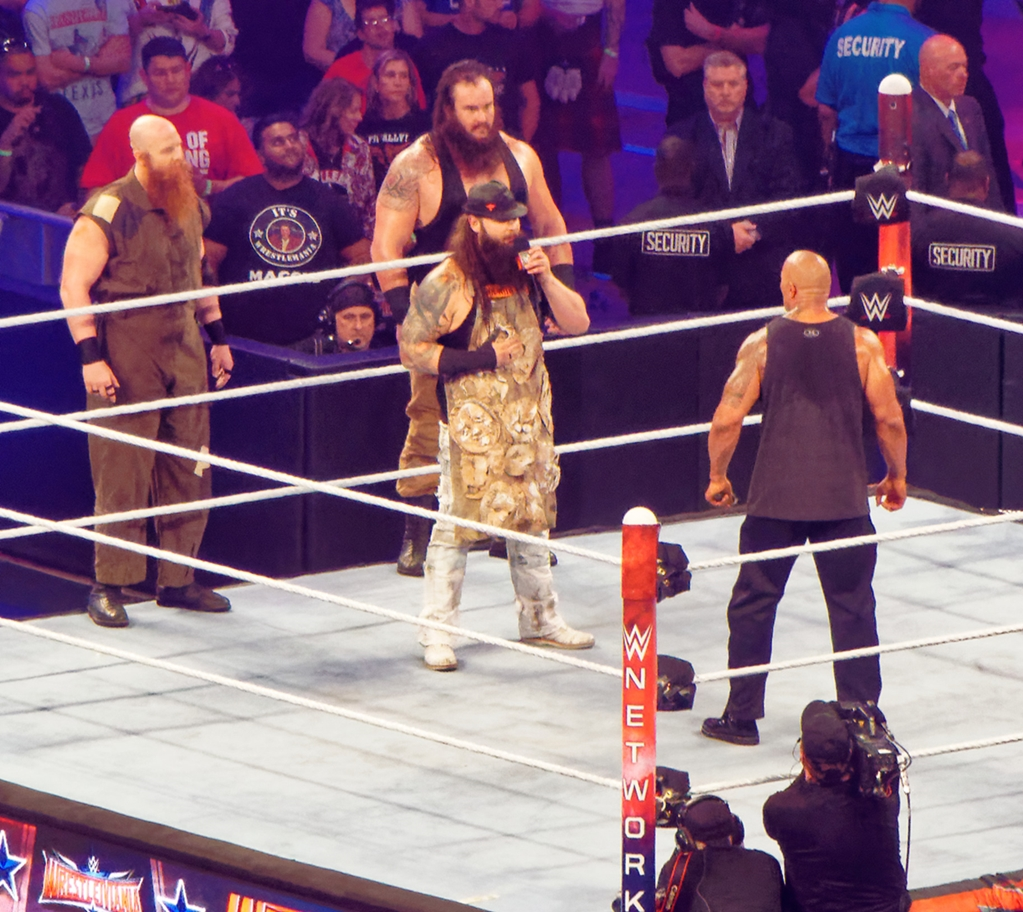
The Wyatt Family (left, Rowan; center, Wyatt; right, Strowman) confronts The Rock at WrestleMania 32.

At TLC: Tables, Ladders & Chairs on December 13, The Wyatt Family defeated Team ECW in an eight-man tag team elimination tables match. Wyatt and Luke Harper lost to Brock Lesnar at Roadblock on March 12 in a handicap match. At WrestleMania 32 on April 3, The Wyatt Family confronted The Rock, who defeated Rowan in an impromptu match in six seconds; the Wyatts were fended off by John Cena and The Rock. On the April 4 episode of Raw, The Wyatt Family attacked The League of Nations, starting an unexplained feud between the two factions and showing signs of a face turn. On April 13, during a match against Reigns at a live event in Italy, Wyatt suffered an injury to his right calf and was pulled off WWE's European tour. His injury prematurely ended the feud. The Wyatt Family returned on the June 20 episode of Raw, starting a feud with WWE Tag Team Champions The New Day, who interrupted Wyatt during his return speech, reverting the group back to heels. The New Day later confronted The Wyatt Family at their compound before the Wyatts defeated them at Battleground on July 24 in a six-man tag team match. In the 2016 WWE draft, Wyatt and Rowan were drafted to the SmackDown brand while Strowman was drafted to the Raw brand.

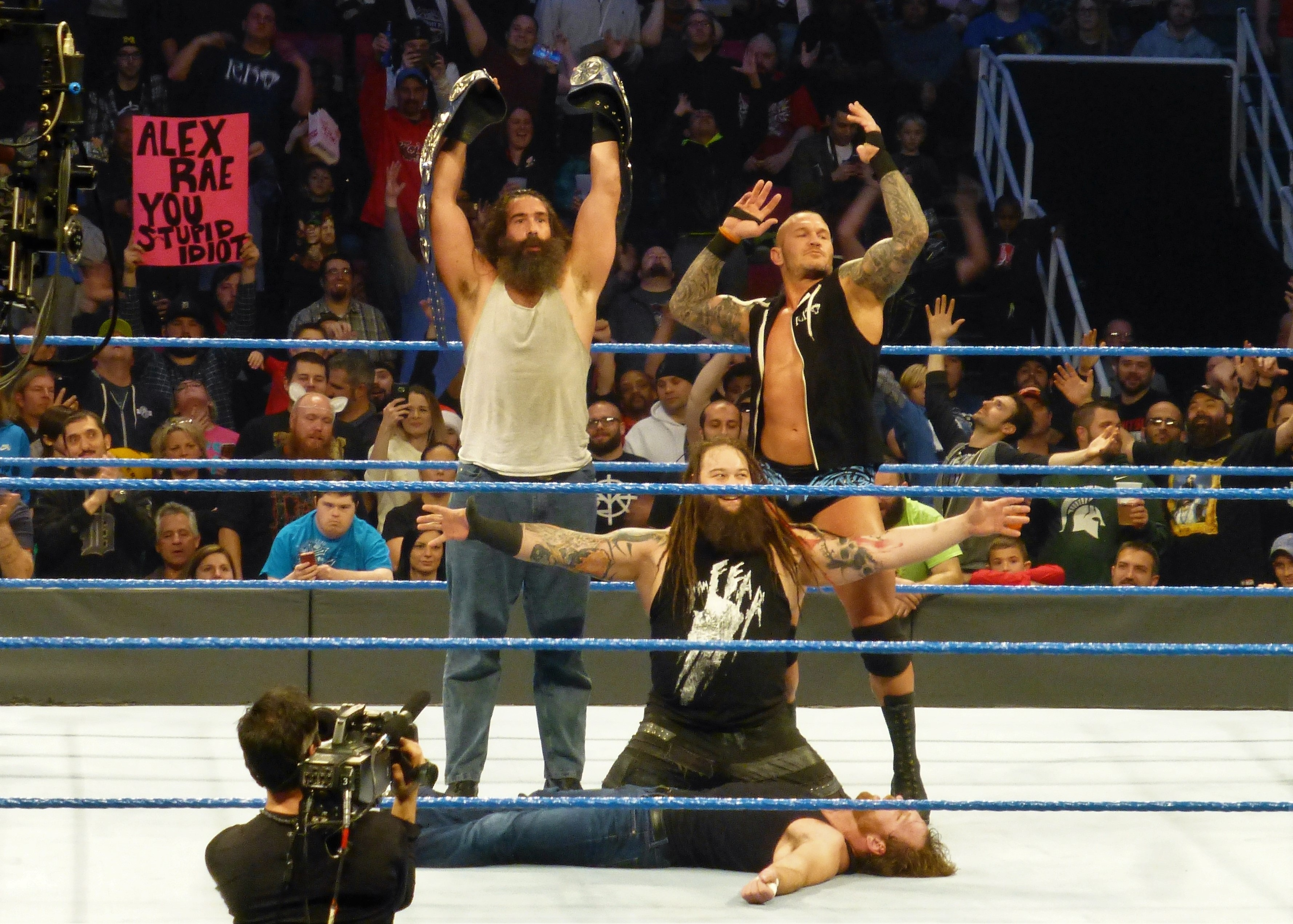
The "New" Wyatt Family as SmackDown Tag Team Champions: (from left to right) Luke Harper, Bray Wyatt and Randy Orton

On the August 16 episode of SmackDown Live, Wyatt walked away from Rowan after he lost his match against Dean Ambrose, leaving Rowan's sheep mask on Wyatt's rocking chair. Wyatt confronted Randy Orton, who he called "damaged" and challenged him to a match at Backlash, which Orton accepted on the August 30 episode of SmackDown Live. At Backlash on September 11, Wyatt attacked Orton before the match, winning by forfeit. Wyatt then faced Kane in a No Holds Barred match, which he lost when Orton interfered. Orton then challenged Wyatt to another match at No Mercy on October 9, which he accepted and won with the help of the returning Harper. On the October 25 episode of SmackDown Live, Orton interfered on Wyatt's behalf in his match with Kane and joined The Wyatt Family.

==== WWE Champion (2016–2017) ====
At Survivor Series on November 20, Wyatt and Orton were the sole survivors for Team SmackDown in the traditional 5-on-5 Survivor Series elimination match after Orton saved Wyatt from a spear from Roman Reigns. The pair then began focusing on stopping the momentum of American Alpha, and to a bigger degree capturing the SmackDown Tag Team Championship, defeating them in a match to become No. 1 contenders. At TLC: Tables, Ladders & Chairs on December 4, they won the championship from Heath Slater and Rhyno, marking Wyatt's first title win in WWE. Wyatt and Orton retained the SmackDown Tag Team Championship against the former champions on the December 6 episode of SmackDown Live but on the December 27 episode of SmackDown Live, Orton and Luke Harper (who defended the championship under the Freebird Rule) lost the title to American Alpha in a four corners elimination tag team match. This started dissent between Harper and Orton, who faced each other on the January 24, 2017, episode of SmackDown Live, which Orton won, leading to Wyatt delivering Sister Abigail to Harper, exiling him from the group. On January 29, Wyatt entered the Royal Rumble match at No. 21 and lasted until the final three: Wyatt and Orton cooperated against Roman Reigns, who eventually eliminated Wyatt but was himself eliminated by Orton, who thereby won the match and a title match at WrestleMania.

On February 12 at Elimination Chamber, Wyatt won the WWE Championship by defeating John Cena, AJ Styles, The Miz, Dean Ambrose, and Baron Corbin in an Elimination Chamber match; it was the first singles title in Wyatt's wrestling career, and the first world title of his career. This raised the possibility of Orton challenging his teammate Wyatt but on the following SmackDown Live, after Wyatt successfully defended the WWE Championship in a triple threat match involving John Cena and AJ Styles (despite a pre-match attack by Harper), Orton pledged allegiance to Wyatt and refused to face him at WrestleMania 33. However, this was revealed to be a ruse as Orton destroyed The Wyatt Family compound, including Sister Abigail's grave, two weeks later, and defeated Wyatt for the title at WrestleMania 33 on April 2, ending Wyatt's reign at 49 days. On April 10, Wyatt was moved to the Raw brand as a part of the Superstar Shake-up; his title rematch at Payback on April 30, billed as a House of Horrors match, was changed into a non-title match; Wyatt defeated Orton after being helped by Jinder Mahal ending their feud.

==== Deleters of Worlds (2017–2018) ====
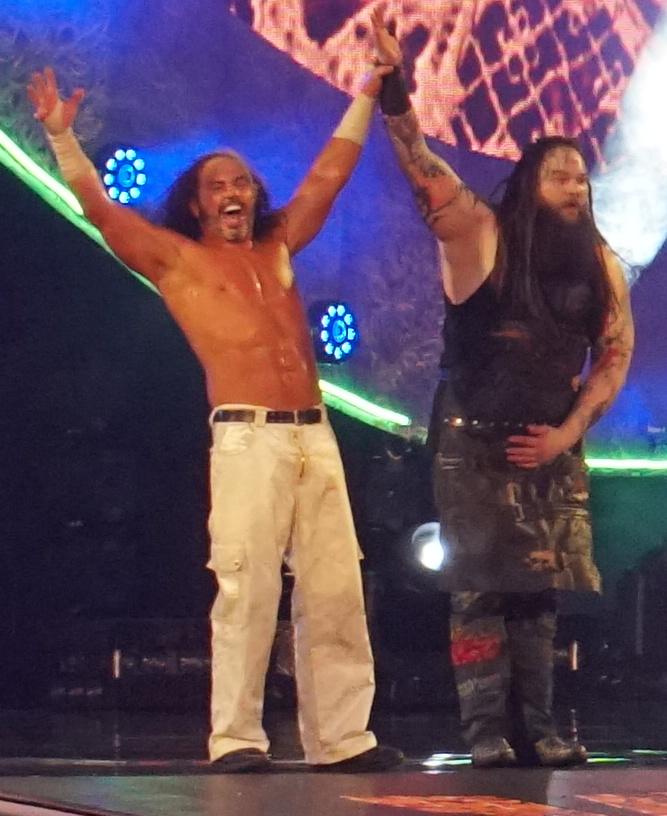
Wyatt and Matt Hardy (left) at WrestleMania 34

At Extreme Rules on June 4, Wyatt failed to become the No. 1 contender for the Universal Championship in a fatal five-way match won by Samoa Joe. After Seth Rollins was unveiled on the cover of WWE 2K18, Wyatt targeted him and defeated him both at Great Balls of Fire on July 9 and again on the following Raw. Wyatt then began a feud with Finn Bálor, resulting in a match between the two at SummerSlam on August 20, which Bálor won under his "Demon King" persona. Wyatt again lost to Bálor at No Mercy on September 24. They were set to have a third match at TLC: Tables, Ladders & Chairs on October 22, but Wyatt was unable to compete due to an illness concern and was replaced in the match by AJ Styles, bringing the feud between Wyatt and Bàlor to a quiet end. Wyatt returned on the November 13 episode of Raw, facing Jason Jordan in a losing effort.

In November, Wyatt began a feud with Matt Hardy, resulting in Hardy's "Broken" gimmick reemerging. The two fought again at Raw 25 Years on January 22, 2018, which Wyatt won. On January 28, Wyatt entered the Royal Rumble match at No. 8, but failed to win after Wyatt and Hardy eliminated each other simultaneously. At Elimination Chamber on February 25, Wyatt lost to Hardy. On the March 19 episode of Raw, after losing to Hardy in an Ultimate Deletion match, Wyatt was pushed into the "Lake of Reincarnation", where he disappeared. At WrestleMania 34 on April 8, Wyatt returned and turned face after he interfered in the André the Giant Memorial Battle Royal, helping Hardy win. They formed a team and won the vacant Raw Tag Team Championship on April 27 at Greatest Royal Rumble, defeating Cesaro and Sheamus. They lost the titles to The B-Team (Bo Dallas and Curtis Axel) in their first pay-per-view title defense on July 15 at Extreme Rules. On the July 23 episode of Raw, they invoked their rematch clause against The B-Team, but were unsuccessful. Soon after, Hardy took time off to heal his injuries, disbanding the team. The reason WWE disbanded the team was because they grew tired of them both pitching several ideas for their characters. Wyatt would go on to temporarily disappear from WWE programming in August.

==== Firefly Fun House and The Fiend (2019–2021) ====
In April 2019, ominous vignettes began airing across WWE programming depicting a sinister buzzard puppet, a witch doll, and other unusual toys. Later that month, Wyatt began to appear in pre-recorded segments as the host of a surreal, eccentric children's program known as Firefly Fun House, sporting different hair and a shorter beard with a leaner physique. The segments featured the aforementioned puppets, called Mercy the Buzzard (a reference to Waylon Mercy, an inspiration for Wyatt's previous gimmick) and Abby the Witch, with Ramblin' Rabbit and Huskus the Pig Boy introduced later (the latter a reference to Wyatt's previous gimmick of Husky Harris), as well as one for Mr. McMahon that occasionally appeared, and humorously featured McMahon's characteristic gritty, deep voice. During the initial segment, Wyatt destroyed a cardboard cutout of his old self with a chainsaw, cheerily telling viewers all they had to do for him to "light the way" was to "let me in", indicating a full transition away from his old persona. The Firefly Fun House segments became more sinister, with one featuring Wyatt painting a picture to "express his suppressed feelings", which was a painting of the Wyatt Family compound being burned with Sister Abigail inside—a reference to his WrestleMania 33 feud with Randy Orton. Another featured him having a picnic with expressionless kids, while another revealed that Wyatt was able to control his darkness. He then appeared in more sinister clothing and a demonic mask resembling an evil clown, a persona he called "The Fiend" that was here to "protect us".

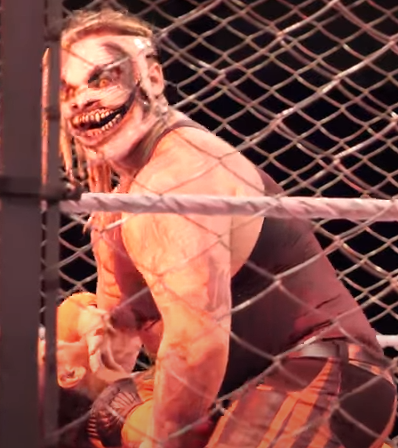
The Fiend competing in a match in 2019.

On the July 15 episode of Raw, Wyatt, as The Fiend, attacked previous rival Finn Bálor with a Sister Abigail, re-establishing himself as a heel. At SummerSlam on August 11, The Fiend quickly defeated Bálor. Over the next several weeks, The Fiend attacked several WWE Hall of Famers and legends including Kurt Angle, Jerry Lawler, Kane, and Mick Foley, also adopting Foley's finishing maneuver, The Mandible Claw. The Fiend then began a feud with then-Universal Champion Seth Rollins by attacking him on September 15 at Clash of Champions. At Hell in a Cell on October 6, they faced each other in a Hell in a Cell match, but the match ended in referee stoppage after The Fiend was buried under several weapons and hit with a sledgehammer by Rollins. Despite the match ending, The Fiend rose as officials checked on him to chase down Rollins and again incapacitate him with the Mandible Claw. The finish was noteworthy for the response from the fans in attendance, who booed loudly and chanted negatively. After he was drafted to the SmackDown brand during the 2019 Draft, The Fiend defeated Rollins on October 31 at Crown Jewel in a falls count anywhere match to win the Universal Championship. The title was subsequently transferred to SmackDown, due to Wyatt being a member of the brand.

After his title victory, Wyatt introduced two new belt designs; the first one, which his Firefly Fun House character held, was a blue-strapped version to signify its move to SmackDown, while the other was a custom belt for The Fiend. The latter design featured his face in place of the center plate and on a black and red worn leather strap, as well as his phrases "Hurt", "Heal" and "Let [Me] In" on the strap (the word "Me" being represented by The Fiend's face). Wyatt retained the title against Daniel Bryan on November 24 at Survivor Series. After Bryan accepted a rematch on the following SmackDown, The Fiend attacked Bryan and ripped out his hair. With Bryan absent the following week, Wyatt started a short feud with The Miz, culminating in a non-title match at TLC: Tables, Ladders & Chairs on December 15, where Wyatt, wrestling for the first time as his Firefly Fun House character, defeated Miz. After the match, Bryan, with a buzz cut and short beard, made his return and attacked Wyatt. At Royal Rumble on January 26, 2020, The Fiend defeated Bryan in a strap match to end their feud.

On the February 7 episode of SmackDown, WWE Hall of Famer Goldberg challenged The Fiend for the Universal Championship during an onscreen interview, which was scheduled for the Super ShowDown event on February 27, where The Fiend character suffered his first loss to Goldberg, ending his reign at 118 days. The following night on SmackDown, The Fiend confronted a returning John Cena and challenged him to a match at WrestleMania 36 that Cena accepted–a rematch from 2014's WrestleMania XXX. On the second night of the event on April 5, rather than a traditional wrestling match, the two faced off in a surreal trip through history as moments from Wyatt's and Cena's history were played out. The Fiend ultimately defeated Cena in the end, marking Wyatt's first and only WrestleMania victory.

On the April 10 episode of SmackDown, Wyatt challenged new Universal Champion Braun Strowman, who won the title at WrestleMania. A title match was scheduled between the two at Money in the Bank on May 10, which Wyatt (as his Firefly Fun House character) lost. He returned in a Firefly Fun House segment on the June 19 episode of SmackDown to confront Strowman, reintroducing his original "The Eater of Worlds" gimmick and reinstating their rivalry. On July 19 at The Horror Show at Extreme Rules, Wyatt defeated Strowman in a non-title "cinematic match" called the Wyatt Swamp Fight. On the July 31 episode of SmackDown, The Fiend attacked Alexa Bliss, who Strowman had an affection for. Two weeks later, after Strowman attacked Bliss with a gorilla press slam to antagonise The Fiend, the lights went out and The Fiend appeared in the ring in Strowmans place, seemingly to help Bliss. Strowman then appeared on the big screen where he and The Fiend were laughing together. At that year's SummerSlam on August 23, The Fiend defeated Strowman to win the Universal Championship for the second time. After the match, they were both attacked by a returning Roman Reigns. At Payback on August 30, The Fiend defended the title against Strowman and Reigns in a triple threat match, which he lost after Reigns pinned Strowman to win the title, thus ending his second reign at 7 days.

In September, his ring name was officially shortened to The Fiend – indicating a complete transition into what was formerly perceived to be Wyatt's alter ego. The Fiend returned on the October 2 episode of SmackDown and attacked Kevin Owens. After attacking Owens, he extended his hand to Alexa Bliss, which she took and smirked as they disappeared simultaneously. The Fiend had his first match on SmackDown the following week, defeating Owens. As part of the 2020 Draft in October, The Fiend was drafted to the Raw brand. He soon revived his old feud with Randy Orton, and at TLC: Tables, Ladders & Chairs on December 20, Orton defeated The Fiend in a Firefly Inferno match before lighting his body on fire. At Fastlane on March 21, 2021, The Fiend returned as a tweener, sporting charred skin and singed, melted clothes; he attacked Orton with a Sister Abigail during his intergender match with Alexa Bliss, allowing Bliss to win by pinfall. Another match between The Fiend and Orton was scheduled for WrestleMania 37. On the second consecutive night of the event on April 11, The Fiend returned and regenerated back to his pre-burned look; however, Bliss appeared during his match and black liquid began to pour down her face, distracting The Fiend and allowing Orton to win with an RKO. After a brief staredown between The Fiend and Bliss, the lights went out and the pair disappeared. On the following episode of Raw, Bliss declared that she no longer needed him and Wyatt's cheery Firefly Fun House persona returned in a Firefly Fun House segment, stating he was looking forward to a fresh start. This marked Wyatt's final appearance in this stint with WWE, as he was released on July 31, ending his 12-year tenure with the company.

==== WWE Return and final appearances (2022–2023) ====
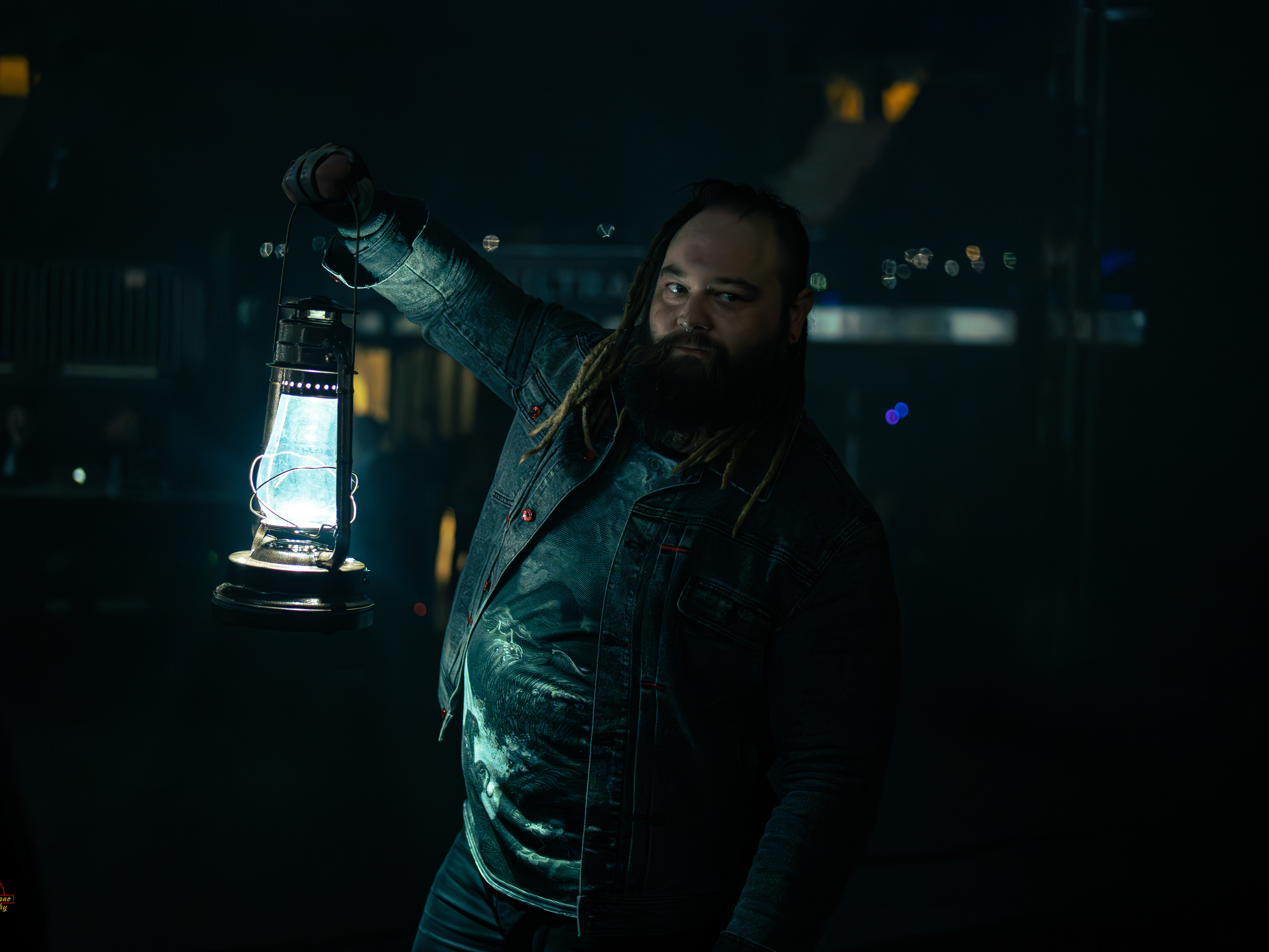
Wyatt in 2022

In September 2022, WWE began playing an a cappella version of "White Rabbit" by Jefferson Airplane at live events and during commercial breaks of televised shows, while QR codes were also hidden in various locations on episodes of Raw and SmackDown. Each code led to websites containing imagery, minigames, and riddles that all vaguely alluded to Wyatt's return and were seemingly connected to the upcoming Extreme Rules event on October 8. At the closure of the event, Wyatt returned to WWE as a face, accompanied by live-action versions of his Firefly Fun House characters and a new mask, revealing himself as the person behind the "White Rabbit" teases. Wyatt's return included a masked character, Uncle Howdy, portrayed by his real-life brother Taylor (previously known as Bo Dallas). On January 23, 2023, at Raw is XXX, the 30th anniversary of Raw, Wyatt interrupted LA Knight in a segment with The Undertaker, in which The Undertaker seemingly gave Wyatt his approval in what many called a "passing of the torch" moment. At the 2023 Royal Rumble on January 28, Wyatt defeated Knight in what ended up being Wyatt's final televised match.

After his feud with Knight, Wyatt began a storyline with Bobby Lashley heading into WrestleMania 39, but he quietly disappeared from television before the event and his storyline with Lashley was canceled. On the February 17, 2023, episode of SmackDown, Wyatt and Howdy laid out Hit Row, followed by Wyatt challenging the winner of Brock Lesnar vs. Bobby Lashley, which took place at that year's Elimination Chamber in February, to a match at WrestleMania 39, which would be Wyatt's final ever appearance in WWE. Reports later indicated that his sudden disappearance was due to Wyatt dealing with a real-life illness. On August 19, five days before his eventual death, it was reported that Wyatt was closing in on a return after spending most of his time since February battling a life-threatening illness.

== Professional wrestling style, persona, and reception ==
=== Character and persona ===
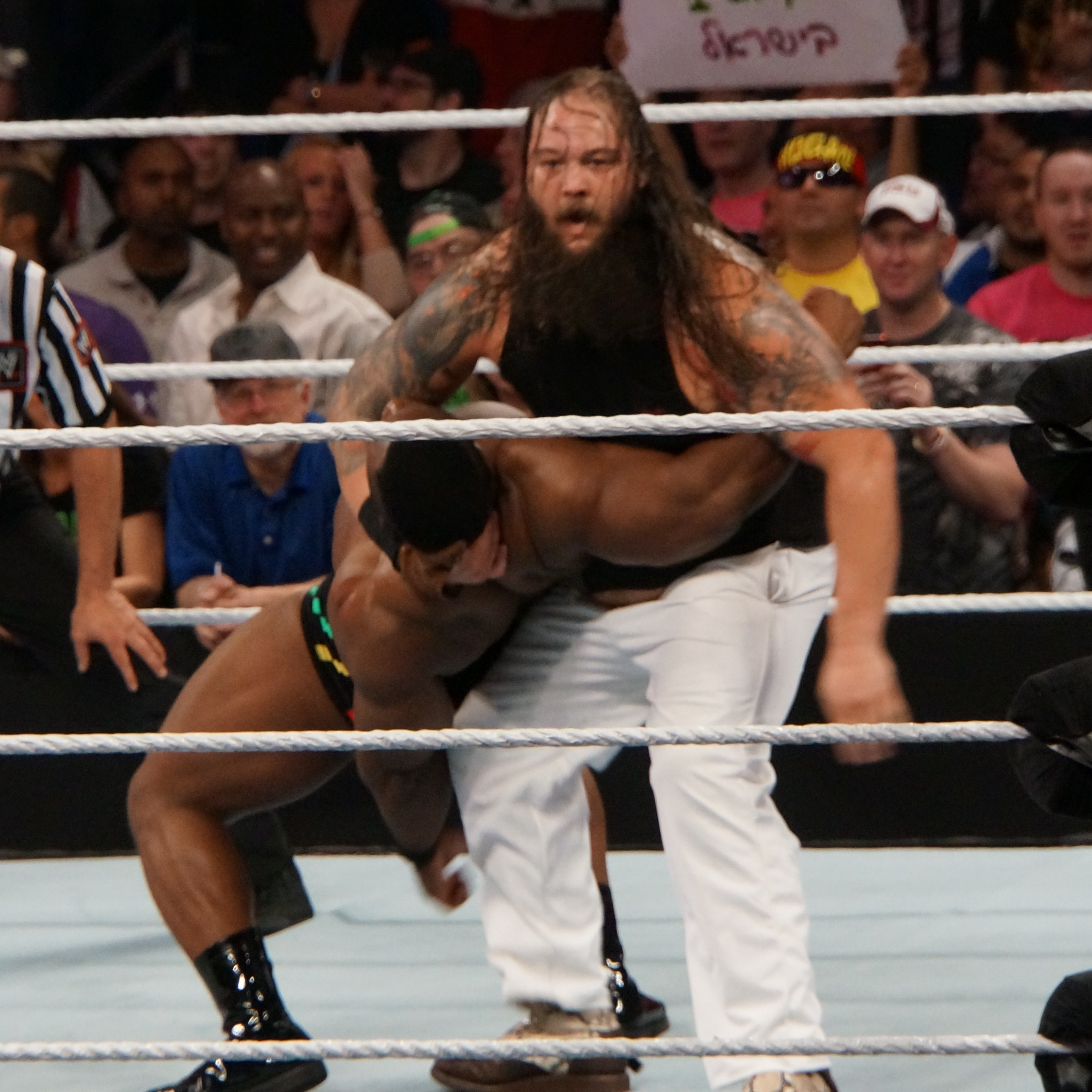
Wyatt setting up his "Sister Abigail" finishing move on Big E

Wyatt's character from 2012 to 2018 was a villainous, sinister cult leader who believed himself to be the "nagging conscience of an immoral world". As the leader of The Wyatt Family, he had main subordinates in Luke Harper and Erick Rowan, as well as Braun Strowman for a brief period. Wyatt used a lantern to light the way in the completely dark arena during entrances; he would invariably be accompanied by fans in attendance lighting the flashlights on their cell phones and waving it around, which were affectionately and notably referred to as his "fireflies", due to the resemblance of the insect's ability to illuminate in the dark. He would finish off most of his promos telling opponents and audiences to "follow the buzzards", his signature catchphrase. The character drew comparisons to Robert De Niro's portrayal of the character Max Cady from the 1991 film Cape Fear and fellow wrestler Waylon Mercy. He would use a swinging reverse STO as a finishing move that would be referred to as Sister Abigail.

Following a hiatus from August 2018 to April 2019, Wyatt returned with a change in character. He started hosting the "Firefly Fun House" where he would perform as a friendly-mannered, gleeful children's television show host, similar to Mr. Rogers. Soon after, he debuted a masked alter-ego called The Fiend, a monstrous figure resembling an evil clown who had supernatural characteristics and remembered all the wrongdoings that others had inflicted on Wyatt in the past. During The Fiend's entrance, he would carry a severed head resembling Wyatt's old cult leader self with a lantern lighting his way inside the head's mouth and used a heavy metal cover of his old theme music, created by band Code Orange. He also adopted the mandible claw as a finishing move, a move formerly used by Mick Foley as his Mankind persona. During in-ring bouts, The Fiend was presented as having unnatural endurance and strength, being able to withstand multiple finishing moves, weapon attacks and more, before kicking out of pins at a one count. Several of The Fiend's matches were also performed under a completely red-lit arena.

After Wyatt returned in October 2022, a new character called Uncle Howdy would appear, based on Richard Kiel's portrayal of Captain Howdy in the 1983 film Hysterical. Howdy would be portrayed by Wyatt's real life brother Taylor, who had also returned with the company, formerly known as Bo Dallas with WWE. Rotunda had been praised for his character work. Readers of the Wrestling Observer Newsletter voted him as the Best Gimmick twice; winning the award in 2013 and 2019.

=== Criticism of booking ===
While Rotunda's character work had been widely praised, the in-ring booking of his characters received criticism. Journalist Dave Meltzer said that although his Funhouse/Fiend character rotation was "fantastic" and he was a "genius" as a performer, it did not "make his matches great". In particular, his Hell in a Cell match against Seth Rollins at the 2019 Hell in a Cell event was universally panned by fans and critics, due to its "horrid" booking and contentious ending that saw the match being stopped by the referee after Rollins attacked The Fiend with numerous weapons, despite Hell in a Cell matches usually ending via pinfall or submission. Some commentators stated that the match was significantly detrimental to the character of The Fiend. The match was named Worst Match of the Year by readers of the Wrestling Observer Newsletter. It was also voted the Gooker Award winner for the year on WrestleCrap. Additionally, various critics opined that Wyatt's constant losses were harmful to his persona and mystique. In 2020, readers of the Wrestling Observer Newsletter recognized The Fiend as the Worst Gimmick of the year, making Wyatt the only performer to have won both Best Gimmick and Worst Gimmick with the same character.

== Other media ==
Rotunda made his video game debut in WWE '12 (as Husky Harris) and later returned, as Bray Wyatt, in WWE 2K15, WWE 2K16, WWE 2K17, WWE 2K18, WWE 2K19, and WWE 2K20. His alternate persona, The Fiend, was a pre-order bonus for the latter game. The final persona of Wyatt and Uncle Howdy were released as DLC for WWE 2K23. Wyatt appeared posthumously in WWE 2K24, WWE 2K25, and WWE 2K26. The new attire and appearance Wyatt had planned to use for a new iteration of The Fiend before his death was added to WWE 2K24 in October 2024, WWE 2K25 in March 2025, and to WWE 2K26 in March 2026. In his only acting role, Rotunda had a brief posthumous voice cameo as a prison guard in the 2023 film Diary of a Wimpy Kid Christmas: Cabin Fever, released a few months after his death.

== Personal life ==
Rotunda married Samantha Pixley in 2012, and they had two daughters; born in 2010 and 2013 before she filed for divorce in 2017. Rotunda and then-WWE announcer JoJo Offerman were reported to be dating during this time. They later had a son named Knash Sixx Rotunda in May 2019, whose godfather is wrestler Braun Strowman, and a daughter born a year later in May 2020, named Hyrie Von Rotunda. They were engaged from April 2022 until his death in August 2023.

== Death ==
On August 24, 2023, Rotunda died of a heart attack in his sleep at his home in Brooksville, Florida, at the age of 36. His death was announced on X (formerly Twitter) by WWE's chief content officer, Triple H, following a phone call he had received from Rotunda's father, Mike, informing him of the news. Rotunda had been dealing with an undisclosed illness since that February, which was supposedly life-threatening. Just days before his death, reports were published stating that he was making progress in his recovery. Shortly after his death, it was revealed that the illness was due to an earlier COVID-19 infection, which had exacerbated a pre-existing heart condition. He had been hospitalized for a heart issue one week before his death, and was advised to wear a specialized vest containing a self-activating defibrillator. At the time of his death, he was not wearing the vest, which police found in his car during their initial investigation.

=== Tributes and legacy ===
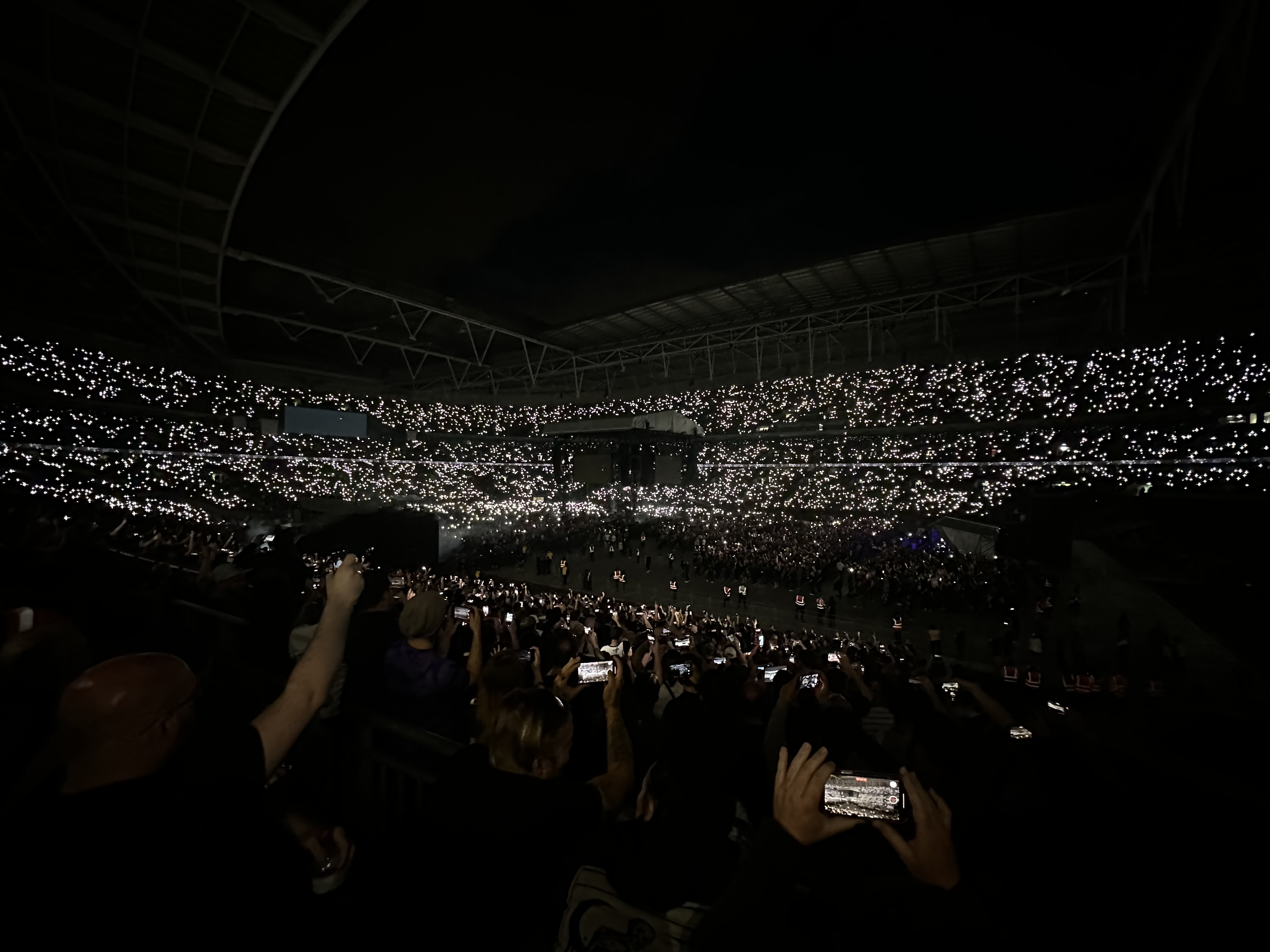
Fans at Wembley Stadium in London using their phone flashlights to honor Rotunda during AEW's All In event, three days after his death

Many prominent wrestlers paid tribute to Rotunda on social media, such as Dwayne "The Rock" Johnson, Ric Flair, Kane, Braun Strowman, Alexa Bliss, Kevin Owens, Mick Foley, Seth Rollins, and Booker T. The August 25 episode of SmackDown honored both Rotunda and Terry Funk, who had died one day before Rotunda; the show opened with a ten-bell salute for the pair. Per WWE tradition, all on-screen talent stood at the top of the entrance ramp during the salute; also present were Wyatt's former Wyatt Family stablemates Erick Rowan who was not signed to WWE at the time, and Strowman, who was recovering from a fusion neck surgery. Wyatt's iconic rocking chair was placed in front of the ramp while the crowd sang "He's Got the Whole World in His Hands", a song often affiliated with Wyatt throughout his WWE career. Further tributes and behind-the-scenes footage of Wyatt aired during the show, with Wyatt's final opponent LA Knight wrestling in the main event against Finn Bálor, who was the first opponent to wrestle Wyatt's "Fiend" persona in SummerSlam 2019. WWE also announced that any further proceeds from Rotunda's merchandise sales would be given to his family. A few months later, Rotunda's father revealed that WWE had signed Rotunda to a Legends contract and arranged for all proceeds from the contract to go to his children.

Wrestlers Braun Strowman, Karrion Kross, and Shotzi, alongside WWE's head of long-term creative Rob Fee, got matching tattoos of Rotunda's Wyatt logo. On the August 28 episode of Raw, WWE again paid homage to Rotunda, replaying the tribute video from SmackDown and turning off the arena lights to see the "fireflies" while his rocking chair again sat on the ramp. Several wrestlers would pay tribute to Rotunda, most notably by wearing armbands with his name on it. Seth Rollins mentioned Wyatt during his promo segment, while his World Heavyweight Championship bore side plates with Rotunda's Fiend logo, which was sported by Wyatt himself throughout his career as champion. Rollins' wife Becky Lynch wrestled in the main event against Zoey Stark and paid tribute to Wyatt after the match by raising an armband reading "Bray" in the air. In a video posted by WWE's YouTube channel on August 30, fellow wrestlers Bayley, Drew McIntyre, Kevin Owens, Sami Zayn and others reflected on the impact Wyatt had on their personal lives, wrestling careers, and WWE. Other wrestling promotions, including All Elite Wrestling (AEW) and Impact Wrestling, also paid tribute to Rotunda at their first live shows after his death, which both took place on August 27; at AEW's All In, the House of Black paid tribute to Wyatt in their ring entrance, accompanied by tens of thousands of "fireflies", while Buddy Matthews (formerly known as Buddy Murphy in WWE) held Wyatt's signature lantern. Impact's Emergence also opened with a ten-bell salute to commemorate Rotunda and Funk.

On August 26, Mark Crozer's "Broken Out In Love" (known as "Live In Fear" in WWE), Wyatt's theme song from 2012 to 2018, was played at half-time during a Premier League soccer match between Arsenal and Fulham at the Emirates Stadium. Make-up artist and actor Tom Savini, who worked with Rotunda for the creation of the Fiend gimmick, commemorated him on X. The band Code Orange, who made his theme songs for both The Fiend and his returning persona, also paid tribute to him. John Squires of horror website Bloody Disgusting wrote that Rotunda was a "truly one of a kind talent inside—and outside—the squared circle ... the 'Eater of Worlds' will go down in history as an all-time great character in the annals of professional wrestling." B.J. Colangelo of film website /Film described Wyatt as "wrestling's horror icon" and wrote that "over the course of his career in WWE, Bray Wyatt truly became the new face of fear, and incorporated horror into the world of wrestling in a way that no one before him ever could."

On April 1, 2024, WWE released a posthumous documentary for Rotunda, titled Bray Wyatt: Becoming Immortal. Narrated by The Undertaker, the film examines both Rotunda's career as Bray Wyatt, and his personal life and features interviews with his family and various WWE personnel. The documentary revealed that Wyatt had been planning to revive the character of The Fiend with a new mask, outfit, and props before his death. After two months of teases implying that WWE intended to honor Wyatt's vision of leading a faction with wrestlers portraying real versions of his Firefly Fun House puppets, his brother Taylor returned as the Uncle Howdy character on the June 17, 2024 episode of Raw and began leading said faction, which was dubbed The Wyatt Sicks, composed of Uncle Howdy, Dexter Lumis, Joe Gacy, Nikki Cross, and Erick Rowan, the latter of whom was formerly Wyatt's subordinate in The Wyatt Family. During the 2024 WWE Hall of Fame induction ceremony on April 5, he was honored by his family (who were there for the induction of his father Mike Rotunda, and his uncle Barry Windham, as part of the US Express tag team) with the crowd showing his traditional "fireflies," and his music being played. The "fireflies" entrance would eventually be adopted by Jey Uso at the start of his match against Damian Priest at Backlash 2024.

== Championships and accomplishments ==
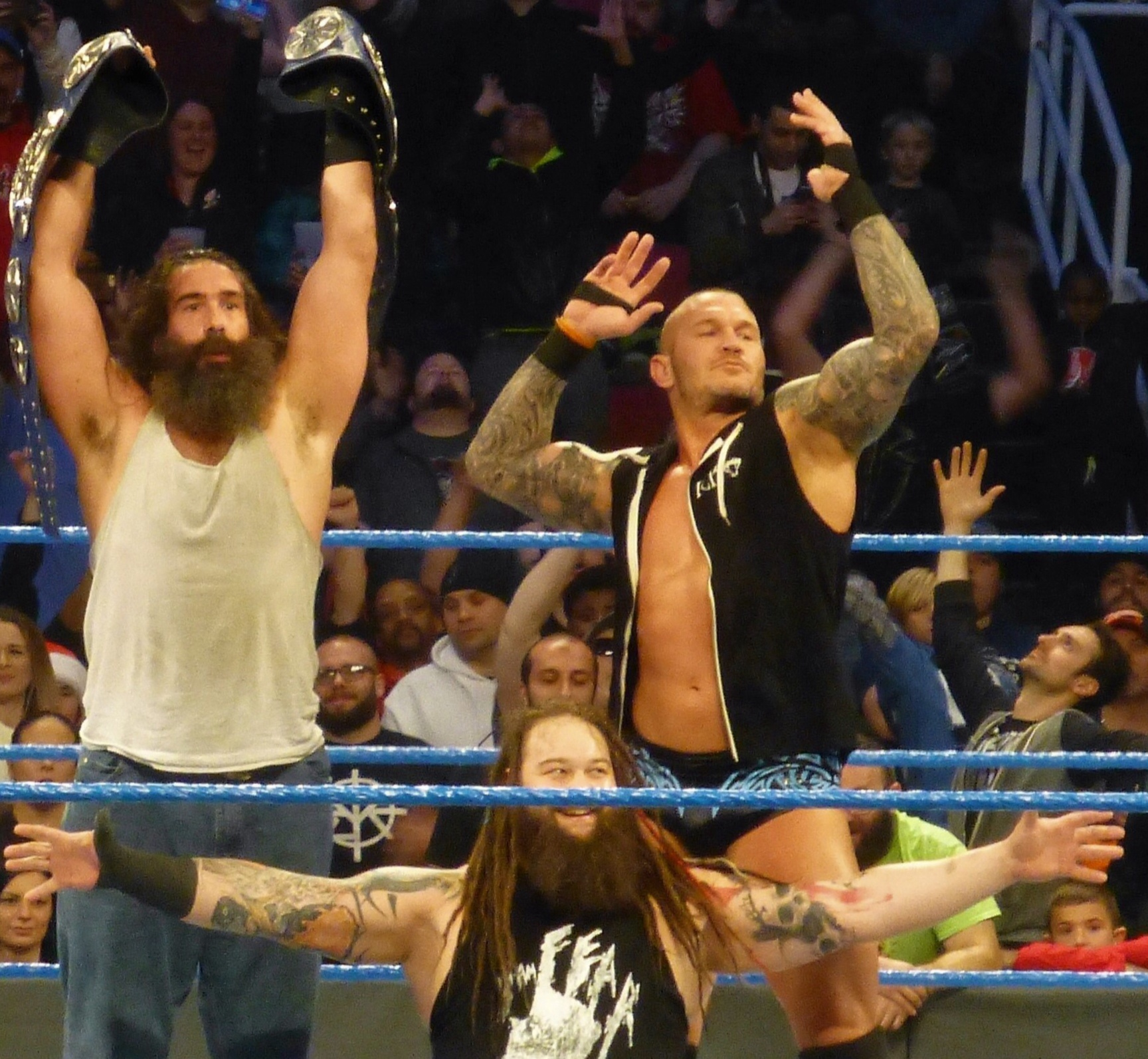
Wyatt was a two-time tag team champion, including the WWE SmackDown Tag Team Championship with Luke Harper and Randy Orton (once)

- CBS Sports
  - Comeback Wrestler of the Year (2019)
- Coastal Championship Wrestling
  - CCW World Heavyweight Championship (1 time)
- Florida Championship Wrestling
  - FCW Florida Tag Team Championship (2 times) – with Bo Rotundo
- New York Post
  - Best Return (2022) – at Extreme Rules
- Pro Wrestling Illustrated
  - Feud of the Year (2010) – The Nexus vs. WWE
  - Match of the Year (2014) vs. John Cena in a Last Man Standing match at Payback
  - Most Hated Wrestler of the Year (2010) – as part of The Nexus
  - Ranked No. 6 of the top 500 singles wrestlers in the PWI 500 in 2014
- WrestleCrap
  - Gooker Award (2019) vs. Seth Rollins Hell in a cell match for WWE Universal Championship at Hell in a Cell
- Wrestling Observer Newsletter
  - Best Gimmick
    - as part of The Wyatt Family (2013)
    - as "The Fiend" (2019)
  - Most Overrated (2020)
  - Worst Gimmick
    - as Sister Abigail (2017)
    - as "The Fiend" (2020)
  - Worst Feud of the Year
    - vs. Randy Orton (2017)
    - vs. Seth Rollins (2019)
    - vs. Braun Strowman (2020)
    - with Alexa Bliss vs. Randy Orton (2021)
  - Worst Worked Match of the Year
    - vs. John Cena at Extreme Rules (2014)
    - vs. Randy Orton at WrestleMania 33 (2017)
    - vs. Seth Rollins at Hell in a Cell (2019)
    - vs. Braun Strowman at The Horror Show at Extreme Rules (2020)
    - vs. LA Knight at Royal Rumble (2023)
- WWE
  - WWE Championship (1 time)
  - WWE Universal Championship (2 times)
  - WWE Raw Tag Team Championship (1 time) – with Matt Hardy
  - WWE SmackDown Tag Team Championship (1 time) – with Randy Orton and Luke Harper (Note: Wyatt, Orton, and Harper defended the title under the Freebird Rule)
  - Tag Team Eliminator (2018) – with Matt Hardy
  - WWE Year-End Award for Male Wrestler of the Year (2019)
- Other
  - Hernando County Sports Hall of Fame (2025) (Football)

== See also ==
- List of premature professional wrestling deaths
