= Hell in a Cell (2019) =

WWE pay-per-view and livestreaming event

- Promotional poster featuring a split image of Bray Wyatt as himself and "The Fiend"
- Promotion: WWE
- Brand(s): Raw; SmackDown
- Date: October 6, 2019
- City: Sacramento, California
- Venue: Golden 1 Center
- Attendance: 10,000

WWE event chronology
| ← Previous; Clash of Champions | Next → Crown Jewel |

Hell in a Cell chronology
| ← Previous; 2018 | Next → 2020 |

The 2019 Hell in a Cell was a professional wrestling pay-per-view (PPV) and livestreaming event produced by WWE, held for wrestlers the promotion's main roster brands, Raw and SmackDown. It was the 11th annual Hell in a Cell event and took place on October 6, 2019, at the Golden 1 Center in Sacramento, California. The event centered on the Hell in a Cell match, a 20-foot-high roofed steel cage that surrounds the ring and ringside area with no countouts or disqualifications and the only way to win is by pinfall or submission in the ring.

Nine matches were contested at the event, including one on the Kickoff pre-show. Two Hell in a Cell matches were contested at the event, both of which were for the Raw brand. The main event, which was a Universal Championship Hell in a Cell match between defending champion Seth Rollins and "The Fiend" Bray Wyatt, ended by referee stoppage. In the other Hell in a Cell match, which was the opening bout, Becky Lynch defeated Sasha Banks to retain the Raw Women's Championship. In other prominent matches, Daniel Bryan and Roman Reigns defeated Erick Rowan and Luke Harper in a tornado tag team match, and Charlotte Flair defeated Bayley to win the SmackDown Women's Championship for a record fifth time, and her record 10th women's world championship overall on WWE's main roster.

The event was met with a mixed-to-negative reception from both critics and fans. Although the first two opening matches were generally praised, the main event was universally panned due to its conclusion.

== Production ==
=== Background ===
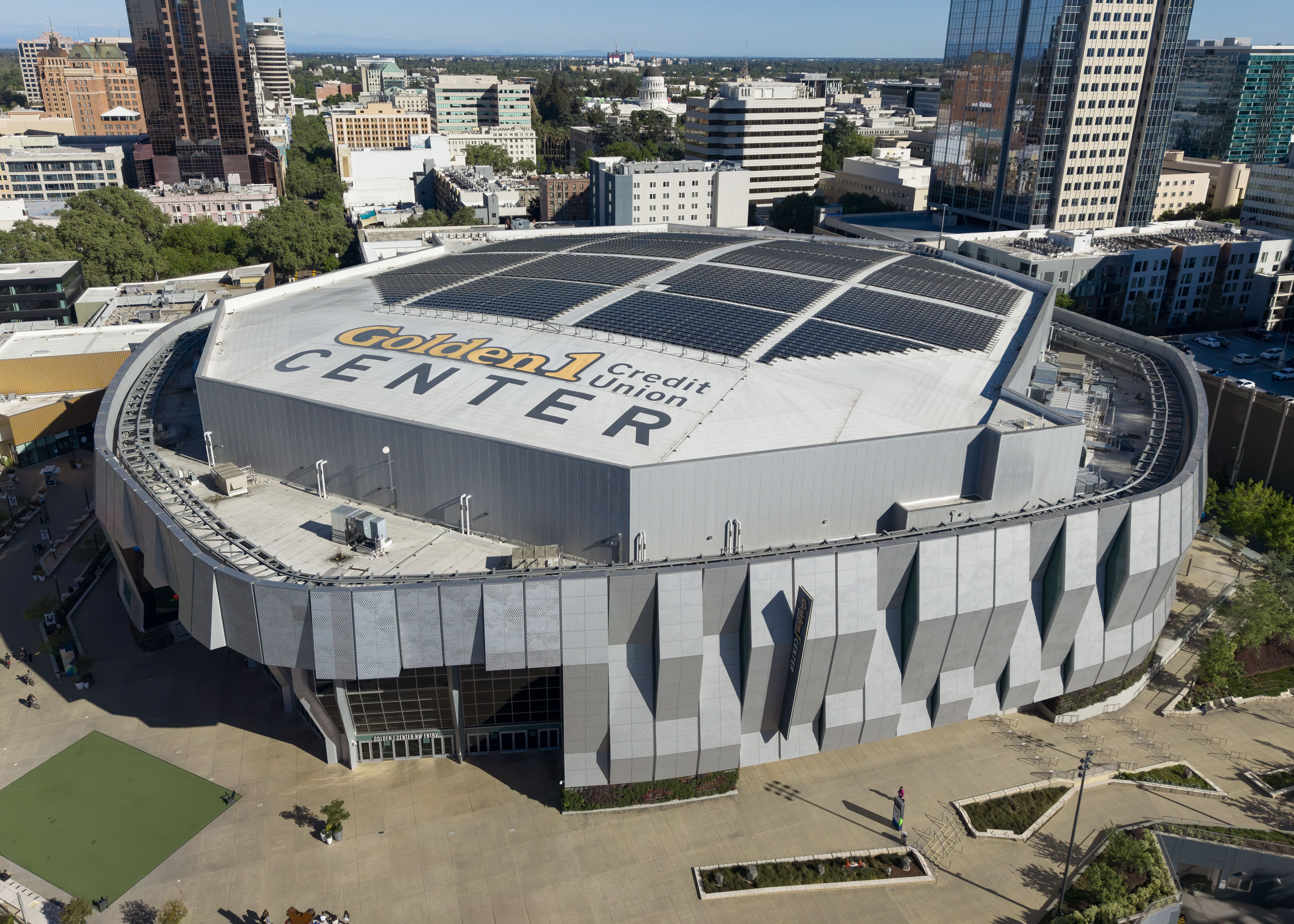
The 11th annual Hell in a Cell event was held at the Golden 1 Center in Sacramento, California.

Hell in a Cell was an annual professional wrestling event produced by WWE since 2009, generally held in October. It was originally broadcast exclusively via pay-per-view (PPV) before it began simultaneously livestreaming on the WWE Network in 2014. The concept of the event came from WWE's established Hell in a Cell match, in which competitors fought inside a 20-foot-high roofed cell structure surrounding the ring and ringside area. The main event match of the card was contested under the Hell in a Cell stipulation. Announced on July 19, 2019, the 11th Hell in a Cell event was scheduled for October 6, 2019, at the Golden 1 Center in Sacramento, California and featured wrestlers from the Raw and SmackDown brand divisions. This returned the event to its regular October slot after the previous year was held in September, and it was the second Hell in a Cell event held in the U.S. state of California, after the 2015 event in Los Angeles. Tickets went on sale on July 26 through Ticketmaster.

=== Storylines ===
The event comprised nine matches, including one on the Kickoff pre-show, that resulted from scripted storylines. Results were predetermined by WWE's writers on the Raw and SmackDown brands, while storylines were produced on WWE's weekly television shows, Monday Night Raw and SmackDown Live (with the latter renamed to Friday Night SmackDown two days prior to the event).

Amid speculation that Bray Wyatt would challenge for the Universal Championship at Hell in a Cell, Wyatt seemingly confirmed the rumors in a "Firefly Fun House" segment on the September 2 episode of Raw. Following Seth Rollins' successful title defense at Clash of Champions, Wyatt appeared as his sinister alternate persona The Fiend and attacked Rollins with a Sister Abigail and the Mandible Claw. The following night on Raw, Rollins addressed The Fiend's attack and announced that he would be facing The Fiend in a Hell in a Cell match at the event. However, the match wasn't necessarily for the Universal Championship, as before Hell in a Cell, Rollins had a scheduled title defense on the September 30 episode of Raw. That match ended in a no-contest when The Fiend attacked Rollins. As a result, Rollins retained the title, thus officially making his match against The Fiend at Hell in a Cell for the Universal Championship.

At Clash of Champions, the Raw Women's Championship match between defending champion Becky Lynch and Sasha Banks ended in a disqualification win for Banks, thus Lynch retained as titles do not change hands via disqualification unless stipulated. Following the match, Lynch and Banks brawled throughout the arena. The following night on Raw, Banks challenged Lynch to a rematch at Hell in a Cell. Lynch later accepted and subsequently changed the match stipulation to a Hell in a Cell match.

Prior to Clash of Champions, Erick Rowan attacked Roman Reigns backstage and lied to Daniel Bryan about it, resulting in him and Bryan splitting as a tag team. Rowan then defeated Reigns in a No Disqualification match at Clash of Champions thanks to the returning Luke Harper, reforming their tag team. On the following SmackDown, Rowan explained that he began to target Reigns to scare him and to show that Reigns was not the dominant figure he was presumed to be. Rowan also claimed that he had been overlooked, underappreciated, and disrespected and that he was not Bryan's equal, but better than him. Bryan later stated that regardless if he was a face or a heel, he never used to lie, and he thought of Rowan as his friend. Bryan was interrupted by Rowan and attacked by Harper. Reigns came out to Bryan's aid, only for Rowan and Harper to dominate Bryan and Reigns. The following week, Rowan defeated Bryan, and after the match, Harper and Rowan attacked Bryan. Reigns again came to Bryan's aid, and this time, they eventually overcame Rowan and Harper. Bryan and Reigns then challenged Rowan and Harper to a tag team match at Hell in a Cell, which was made official. On SmackDown's 20th Anniversary on October 4, Reigns defeated Rowan in a lumberjack match. After the match, Bryan shook Reigns' hand out of mutual respect. The day of the event, the match stipulation was changed to a tornado tag team match.

At Clash of Champions, Bayley controversially defeated Charlotte Flair by slamming her head into an exposed turnbuckle to retain the SmackDown Women's Championship. Their feud would continue on subsequent episodes of Raw and SmackDown, also involving Sasha Banks and Raw Women's Champion Becky Lynch. On SmackDown's 20th Anniversary on October 4, Flair and Lynch defeated Bayley and Banks when Flair submitted Bayley. Due to this win, Flair earned herself a rematch for the SmackDown Women's Championship at Hell in a Cell.

In the King of the Ring final on the September 16 episode of Raw, Baron Corbin defeated Chad Gable to win the tournament, subsequently changing his ring name to King Corbin. The following night on SmackDown, after Corbin insulted Gable, Gable attacked Corbin. A rematch between the two took place the following week, which ended in a disqualification win for Gable after Corbin attacked Gable with his scepter. The day of the event, another rematch between the two was scheduled for Hell in a Cell.

On the September 16 episode of Raw, The O.C. (United States Champion AJ Styles, Luke Gallows, and Karl Anderson) defeated Cedric Alexander and The Viking Raiders (Ivar and Erik) in a six-man tag team match. Following the match, The O.C. attacked Alexander and The Viking Raiders. On the next two episodes of Raw, The Viking Raiders defeated Gallows and Anderson in tag team matches. On October 6, a six-man tag team match pitting all three members of The O.C. against The Viking Raiders and a partner of their choosing was scheduled for Hell in a Cell.

The day of the event, Alexa Bliss and Nikki Cross were scheduled to defend the WWE Women's Tag Team Championship against The Kabuki Warriors (Asuka and Kairi Sane). Bliss and Cross last eliminated The Kabuki Warriors in a fatal four-way tag team elimination match to win the titles back in August.

Also on the day of the event, after weeks of feuding, a match between Natalya and Lacey Evans was scheduled for the Hell in a Cell Kickoff pre-show.

== Event ==
Other on-screen personnel
| Role: | Name: |
|---|---|
| Commentators | Michael Cole (SmackDown) |
| Commentators | Corey Graves (SmackDown) |
| Commentators | Vic Joseph (Raw) |
| Commentators | Jerry Lawler (Raw) |
| Commentators | Dio Maddin (Raw) |
| Spanish commentators | Carlos Cabrera |
| Spanish commentators | Marcelo Rodríguez |
| German commentators | Carsten Schaefer |
| German commentators | Tim Haber |
| German commentators | Calvin Knie |
| Ring announcers | Greg Hamilton (SmackDown) |
| Ring announcers | Mike Rome (Raw) |
| Referees | Danilo Anfibio |
| Referees | Jason Ayers |
| Referees | Shawn Bennett |
| Referees | John Cone |
| Referees | Dan Engler |
| Referees | Darrick Moore |
| Referees | Eddie Orengo |
| Referees | Ryan Tran |
| Referees | Rod Zapata |
| Interviewers | Charly Caruso |
| Interviewers | Kayla Braxton |
| Interviewers | Sarah Schreiber |
| Pre-show panel | Jonathan Coachman |
| Pre-show panel | Charly Caruso |
| Pre-show panel | Sam Roberts |
| Pre-show panel | Booker T |

=== Pre-show ===
During the Hell in a Cell Kickoff pre-show, Natalya faced Lacey Evans. During the match, Evans attempted her own Sharpshooter on Natalya, only for Natalya to send Evans out of the ring. In the climax, as Evans attempted a Moonsault, Natalya avoided it and forced Evans to submit to the Sharpshooter to win the match. After the match, Natalya performed her own Woman's Right on Evans, just like Evans did to Natalya following Evans' win over her on the previous Raw.

Also on the pre-show, Randy Orton and Ali had a confrontation backstage which lead to Ali challenging Orton to a match which would take place on the main card.

=== Preliminary matches ===
The actual pay-per-view began with Becky Lynch defending the Raw Women's Championship against Sasha Banks in a Hell in a Cell match. Before the match began, Banks attacked Lynch, leading to the two fighting outside the cell, where Banks gained the upper hand. After Banks gloated inside the cell, Lynch slammed the cell door into Banks, and once both superstars were inside the ring, the match officially started. After Lynch gained the upper hand on Banks with the chain that locked the door, Lynch locked the door with the chain herself. Lynch and Banks then introduced a ladder, a table, and chairs into the proceedings. Outside the ring, Banks performed a Meteora from the ring apron on Lynch into the ladder, which was leaning against the cell wall, for a nearfall. Banks then focused on injuring Lynch's arm before performing another Meteora on Lynch, who was seated on a chair, for a nearfall. The momentum shifted when Lynch dropkicked Banks from the ring apron into the cell wall. Lynch then performed an Exploder suplex on Banks into the cell wall. Back inside the ring, Lynch sent Banks face first onto the chair for a nearfall. Lynch then performed a top-rope dropkick on Banks, who was holding the chair, for a nearfall, after which, Banks rolled out of the ring to retrieve a kendo stick. After using it to momentarily take down Lynch, Banks wedged two other kendo sticks into the corner of the cell and attempted to send Lynch into them, however, Lynch blocked and sent Banks face first into them. Lynch then performed a dropkick from the ring apron on Banks, who was seated on a chair being held up by those kendo sticks, and followed up with a top-rope leg drop back inside the ring for another nearfall. As Lynch set up the table, Banks performed a Backstabber on Lynch. After avoiding being powerbombed through the table, Banks sent Lynch through the table with a Meteora for another nearfall. Banks then retrieved another kendo stick and used it to apply the Bank Statement, but Lynch escaped by crawling out of the ring and repeatedly struck Banks with the kendo stick. Banks then sent Lynch face first into the chair that was sticking off the cell wall. In the closing moments, with Lynch knocked out inside the ring, Banks threw several chairs in the ring and struck Lynch 23 times with one of the chairs with a couple of chair shots to the head. However, while Banks was on the middle rope, Lynch intercepted Banks with a light punch and followed up with an Exploder suplex onto the chairs. Lynch applied the Dis-arm-her, and Banks submitted after attempting to grab Lynch's hair to escape. As a result, Lynch retained the title.

In the second match, Daniel Bryan and Roman Reigns took on Erick Rowan and Luke Harper in a tornado tag team match. During the match, after Harper and Rowan dominated, they attempted to powerbomb Bryan through an announce table, but Bryan performed a hurricanrana on Harper and Reigns speared Rowan through the table. Later, Harper blocked another hurricanrana from Bryan and performed a middle-rope powerbomb for a nearfall. In the end, Reigns performed a Superman Punch on Harper followed by a Running Knee by Bryan and a Spear by Reigns on Harper to win the match. Following the match, Reigns attempted to shake Bryan's hand out of respect, only for Bryan to insist on a hug and the two eventually embraced.

After that, Randy Orton faced Ali. In the end, Orton attempted an RKO, but Ali blocked with a handstand before rolling up Orton for a nearfall. As Ali went for a facebuster, Orton countered into an RKO to win the match.

In the fourth match, Alexa Bliss and Nikki Cross defended the WWE Women's Tag Team Championship against The Kabuki Warriors (Asuka and Kairi Sane). In the climax, while the referee was checking on Bliss and Sane outside the ring, Asuka spat green mist in Cross' face and pinned her after a Roundhouse Kick to win the titles.

After that, The O.C. (United States Champion AJ Styles, Luke Gallows, and Karl Anderson) faced The Viking Raiders (Ivar and Erik) and a partner of their choosing, which was revealed to be Braun Strowman, in a six-man tag team match. In the end, after Strowman dominated The O.C., the trio attacked Strowman and were eventually disqualified. After the match, Styles attempted a Phenomenal Forearm, but Strowman knocked him out with a right hand.

In a backstage segment, Tamina (in her first appearance since WrestleMania 35) rolled up Carmella to win the WWE 24/7 Championship.

Next, King Corbin faced Chad Gable. In the climax, Corbin attempted to use his scepter on Gable, who avoided it and rolled up Corbin to win the match, with the ring announcer announcing him as Shorty Gable (upon Corbin's request).

After that, new 24/7 champion Tamina emerged from backstage to hide among the international broadcast teams. In a scuffle involving Funaki, Carmella performed a superkick on Tamina, followed by R-Truth pinning Tamina to win the 24/7 Championship for a record 20th time.

In the penultimate match, Bayley defended the SmackDown Women's Championship against Charlotte Flair. During the match, Bayley focused on injuring Flair's leg, and later on, Flair did the same thing to Bayley. Flair performed Natural Selection on Bayley, who grabbed the bottom rope to break the pin. As Flair went for a Moonsault, Bayley got her knees up. Outside the ring, Flair performed a Fallaway Slam on Bayley. Back inside, Bayley countered a figure-four leglock attempt into a small package for a nearfall. Bayley blocked a Big Boot and attempted to roll Flair up while using the ropes for leverage, but the referee caught her. Flair took advantage by performing a Big Boot and forced Bayley to submit to the Figure Eight Leglock to win the title for a record fifth time, and her overall record 10th women's championship on WWE's main roster.

=== Main event ===
In the main event, Seth Rollins defended the Universal Championship against "The Fiend" Bray Wyatt in a Hell in a Cell match, which was bathed in red lighting. After The Fiend dominated, Rollins performed a Frog Splash on The Fiend through a table and followed up with The Stomp, but The Fiend got right back up and countered a second Stomp attempt into Sister Abigail for a nearfall. Outside the ring, The Fiend used a gigantic mallet to ram Rollins into the cell wall. Rollins recovered and performed another Stomp on The Fiend, this time onto the mallet. Back inside the ring, Rollins followed up with three more Stomps, a Pedigree, and a sixth Stomp for a one count. Rollins performed five more Stomps to make it 11, and retrieved a chair, which he used to hit The Fiend in the face for another one count. Rollins placed the chair on The Fiend and slammed a ladder onto it for a two count. Rollins then placed the ladder on top of The Fiend and used a toolbox to repeatedly smash it. In the climax, Rollins obtained a sledgehammer, but the referee urged him to not use it. After contemplation, Rollins slammed the sledgehammer on top of the weapons over The Fiend, and the referee called for the bell to stop the match without a winner. After the cage was raised, paramedics tended to The Fiend, who got up and attacked Rollins with the Mandible Claw before throwing him outside the ring, where he performed Sister Abigail. The Fiend pulled up the ringside covering and then performed another Sister Abigail, this time on the exposed concrete, before incapacitating Rollins with the Mandible Claw with blood pouring from Rollins' mouth. The event ended with The Fiend's laughter echoing throughout the arena.

== Reception ==
Hell in a Cell received mixed-to-negative reviews, with the Raw Women's Championship and tornado tag team matches receiving the most praise but the main event match being the overwhelming focus of criticism. Of note, the crowd rejected the perceived illogical finish of the main event match (a referee stoppage of a match under no disqualification rules that traditionally would not end in such a manner). The crowd soon started roaring thunderous "boos" whilst also chanting "bullshit", "refund", "restart the match", and also "AEW", in reference to All Elite Wrestling, a rival wrestling company. On social media, the event ended up trending "for the wrong reasons", as WWE fans made "memes about the ending to Hell in a Cell while questioning the logic behind the promotion's booking". Also trending after the event was #CancelWWENetwork. According to Dave Meltzer on Wrestling Observer Radio, the main event was perceived by WWE as "a disaster, and that's an understatement". WWE Hall of Famer X-Pac, who appeared on WWE's live reaction talk show Watch Along, reacted indignantly to the end of the main event. Acknowledging that WWE may not invite him back to such reaction shows, X-Pac nevertheless questioned: "how the hell do you get DQ'd in a Hell in a freakin' Cell?" Former WWE referee Jim Korderas also did not like the ending, since during the Hell in a Cell match "all of the rules are thrown out the window and in this match there needs to be a finality. This match was designed to negate stuff like a ref stoppage".

Dave Meltzer, on the Wrestling Observer Radio, stated that from a "decision making" and "mental booking standpoint", Hell in a Cell was "one of the worst" professional wrestling pay-per-views of all time. Alternatively, from a "wrestling execution standpoint", Hell in a Cell was a "better than okay" show, with two opening matches being "really good" and the middle being "fine", but it was just "killed by the last match". On the Wrestling Observer Newsletter, the event was described as a "disaster". Meltzer rated the two opening matches 4 stars, and the main event -2 stars. The latter was described as "perhaps the worst main event in pro wrestling history where the fault doesn't at all lie in either of the competitors", due to "the tinting of the visual, the overly long match, the babyface who the crowd was rejecting more-and-more and a finish that can't be explained". Meltzer also criticized the "wonky match order", as after the first two big matches were over, the crowd "was just waiting for the main event" (only three matches were promoted on TV), resulting in a "blah" middle of the show that seemed like it "took forever".

Philip Martinez of Newsweek stated that Hell in a Cell "may go down in history for one of the more disappointing finishes in modern WWE history". Daniel van Boom of CNET called Hell in a Cell "a bad show", "as bad as it gets" for any show with "two great matches on them" (the Raw women's title match and the tornado tag team match), as most of the show was "skippable, and the ending was fantastically stupid".

Mike Tedesco of WrestleView declared Hell in a Cell to be the worst WWE PPV held in 2019 within the United States thus far. Tedesco wrote that the main event's "bad storytelling" hurt the perception of its participants and the Hell in a Cell match gimmick. Banks-Lynch was "slow at times with some mistimed spots, but they were innovative in this and worked hard", while Orton-Ali "was pretty damn good" for an unannounced match. The tornado tag match and Bayley-Charlotte were "decent". The trios match was "really, really bad", the women's tag title match was "painfully dull", and Gable-Corbin was "just there".

Jason Powell of Pro Wrestling Dot Net stated the "show peaked with the first two matches, but that awful main event finish is one that will be talked about for years to come". It "was one of the most idiotic finishes" he'd "ever seen". Powell also criticized the finishes to the trios match and Bayley-Charlotte. Wade Keller of Pro Wrestling Torch called the main event a "disaster start to finish", stating that it was "stupid" that a Hell in a Cell match was ended because it got too violent. Therefore, Keller declared AEW the winner of the main event. As for the rest of the show, Keller described Lynch-Banks as "tremendous", 4.25 stars out of 5, and the tornado tag match as "excellent", 4 stars. Keller also described Corbin-Gable as their "least inspired effort so far", the 24/7 title events as "really flat" including "stereotypical zany comedy antics" by the former Japanese wrestler Funaki, and lastly, Orton-Ali as lacking excitement.

Adam Silverstein and Jack Crosby of CBS Sports said that the event "looked to be going well for much of the three-hour card until hitting a main event wall that left many fans confused -- and even worse, some legitimately angry at WWE". They praised the Raw Women's Championship Hell in a Cell match, giving it a grade of A+, stating that "this was the type of top-tier match we have been dying to see from Lynch since she won the main event of WrestleMania, and it comes as no surprise that Banks was the one to give it to her", and that the match was "nearly picture-perfect from start to finish, and both women looked like stars in the end". Silverstein and Crosby gave the tornado tag team match a grade of B+, stating that "for a storyline that got massively convoluted and a match that was not highly anticipated despite two fan favorites teaming, these four truly delivered a bout that thrilled the fans". Silverstein and Crosby criticized the Universal Championship Hell in a Cell match, saying that the "presentation was solid", but the "booking was horrid". He mentioned Rollins getting lots of offense on The Fiend while fans clearly wanted The Fiend to win the match, and said that "it was typical WWE not delivering, and fans had every right to be upset". They concluded that "everything was working and heading in the right direction until the endless stomps began".

The main event was also voted the worst match of the year by the Wrestling Observer Newsletter, becoming the most negatively received Hell in a Cell match of all time. The main event was voted as the winner of WrestleCrap's Gooker Award for the worst gimmick, storyline, or event in wrestling in 2019. In its induction, it was noted that having the WWE 2K20 video game—whose release shortly after the event was marred by numerous bugs—as presenting sponsor of the show should have foreshadowed its quality, since "seeing the Gooker winner being sponsored by the second runner up for the award is a whole new rancid territory".

Erik Beaston of Bleacher Report gave praise to the Raw Women's Championship Hell in a Cell match, giving it a grade of A+, stating that "the need to have a Hell in a Cell match every year watered down the gimmick over time, but after what felt like an eternity, Lynch and Banks returned the intensity, aggression, violence and sense of urgency to the bout". He called the match "outstanding", and that it "not only reminded fans of how excellent Banks is but also confirmed that Lynch is, without a doubt, the new face of WWE in 2019". He also praised the tornado tag team match, giving it a grade of A, stating that the match was "utter chaos in the best way as Harper and Rowan destroyed and demolished Bryan and Reigns", who "did just enough to divide and conquer, eventually putting the lone Harper away to secure the win". He also said that it was a "fine tag team match that should put the rivalry in bed for the WWE draft". However, Beaston panned the Universal Championship Hell in a Cell match, giving it a grade of F, stating that the match was "an overbooked atrocity that Vince McMahon and WWE should be ashamed to present to its fans after the week that was in wrestling". He mentioned that The Fiend "completely captivated the audience and left them wanting more", but "instead of paying it off with the short, sweet and dominant victory that would serve as its coronation", WWE "overthought the scenario and sought to drag things out for another pay-per-view rather than pay it off". Beaston also stated that "the company failed its fans and Wyatt to the point that whatever aura The Fiend had built for itself has now been extinguished". Beaston concluded that "the outcome was horrendously damaging".

== Aftermath ==
On the following Raw, all the women's champions were put into a champions showcase tag team match, featuring Raw Women's Champion Becky Lynch and new SmackDown Women's Champion Charlotte Flair against new Women's Tag Team Champions The Kabuki Warriors (Asuka and Kairi Sane). The Kabuki Warriors won after Asuka spat green mist in Lynch's face and Sane pinned her. After the match, former tag team champions Alexa Bliss and Nikki Cross ran out and attacked The Kabuki Warriors.

The 2019 WWE Draft began on the following episode of SmackDown. On that episode, Bayley, sporting shorter hair and destroying her Bayley-buddies during her entrance, reclaimed the SmackDown Women's Championship from Charlotte Flair. On the subsequent Raw, number one Raw draft pick Becky Lynch was scheduled to face SmackDown draftee Sasha Banks in a non-title rematch to determine which brand would receive the first draft pick of the night. Banks, however, was unable to compete due to injury and was replaced by Flair. Lynch won and Flair was later drafted to Raw.

Also on SmackDown (the first night of the 2019 draft), Universal Champion Seth Rollins (representing Raw) faced Roman Reigns (representing SmackDown) with the winner earning that brand the first draft pick that night. The match ended when "The Fiend" Bray Wyatt appeared from underneath the ring and attacked Rollins, resulting in Rollins winning via disqualification and earning Raw the first draft pick. Wyatt was later drafted to SmackDown. On the following Raw (night two of the draft), Rollins was drafted to Raw. Despite this, a Falls Count Anywhere match between Rollins and The Fiend for the Universal Championship was made official for Crown Jewel. The match later had an added stipulation in that the referee could not stop the match for any reason. At the event, The Fiend defeated Rollins to win the title; this subsequently transferred the title to SmackDown.

During Hell in a Cell, a rematch between Lacey Evans and Natalya was scheduled for the following Raw as a Last Woman Standing match, where Natalya won. Though Evans was drafted to SmackDown and Natalya was drafted to Raw at night one of the 2019 draft, another match between the two was later scheduled for Crown Jewel, which was the first time a women's match took place in Saudi Arabia, where Natalya again won.

Also on the following SmackDown, King Corbin faced Chad Gable, now officially going by Shorty Gable (later changed to Shorty G), in a rematch where Corbin won.

== Results ==
| No. | Results | Stipulations | Times |
|---|---|---|---|
| 1^{P} | Natalya defeated Lacey Evans by submission | Singles match | 9:25 |
| 2 | Becky Lynch (c) defeated Sasha Banks by submission | Hell in a Cell match for the WWE Raw Women's Championship | 21:50 |
| 3 | Daniel Bryan and Roman Reigns defeated Luke Harper and Erick Rowan by pinfall | Tornado tag team match | 16:45 |
| 4 | Randy Orton defeated Ali by pinfall | Singles match | 12:10 |
| 5 | The Kabuki Warriors (Asuka and Kairi Sane) defeated Alexa Bliss and Nikki Cross (c) by pinfall | Tag team match for the WWE Women's Tag Team Championship | 10:25 |
| 6 | Braun Strowman and The Viking Raiders (Erik and Ivar) defeated The O.C. (AJ Styles, Luke Gallows, and Karl Anderson) by disqualification | Six-man tag team match | 8:15 |
| 7 | Chad Gable defeated King Corbin by pinfall | Singles match | 12:40 |
| 8 | Charlotte Flair defeated Bayley (c) by submission | Singles match for the WWE SmackDown Women's Championship | 10:15 |
| 9 | Seth Rollins (c) vs. "The Fiend" Bray Wyatt ended due to match stoppage | Hell in a Cell match for the WWE Universal Championship | 17:30 |
(c) / – the champion(s) heading into the match; P / – the match was broadcast on the pre-show
